= List of awards and nominations received by Joan Allen =

Joan Allen awards and nominations
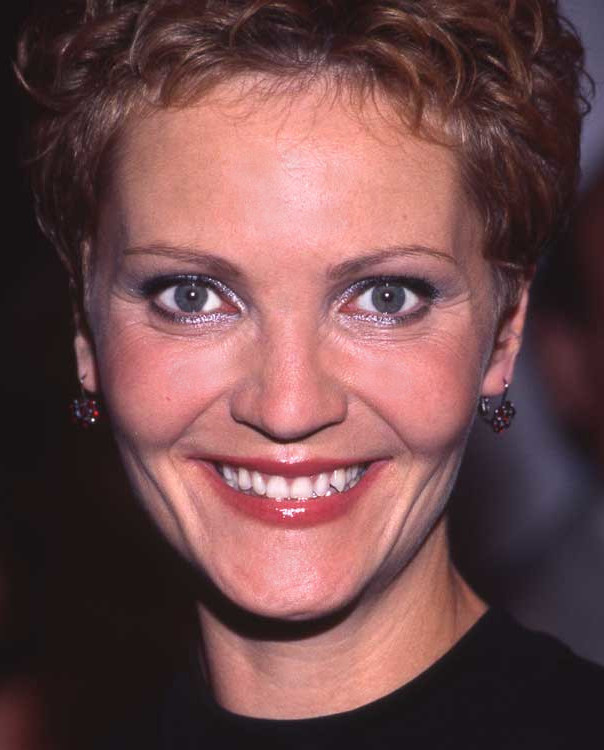
- Allen at the 25th Toronto International Film Festival in 2000
Awards and nominations
| Award | Wins | Nominations |
| Academy Awards | 0 | 3 |
| BAFTA Awards | 0 | 1 |
| Canadian Screen Awards | 1 | 1 |
| Emmy Awards | 0 | 3 |
| Golden Globe Awards | 0 | 3 |
| Screen Actors Guild Awards | 0 | 4 |
| Tony Awards | 1 | 2 |

Totals (Note: Certain award groups do not simply award one winner. They acknowledge several different recipients, have runners-up, and have third place. Since this is a specific recognition and is different from losing an award, runner-up mentions are considered wins in this award tally. For simplification and to avoid errors, each award in this list has been presumed to have had a prior nomination.)
- Wins: 33
- Nominations: 80

Joan Allen is an American actress who has received various awards and nominations, including a Canadian Screen Award and a Tony Award. Additionally, she has been nominated for three Academy Awards, a British Academy Film Award, three Golden Globe Awards, and three Primetime Emmy Awards.

Allen's off-Broadway debut in And a Nightingale Sang (1983) earned her the Drama Desk Award for Outstanding Actress in a Play. Her first Broadway role came in 1987 with playwright Lanford Wilson's Burn This, for which she won the Tony Award for Best Actress in a Play. Following further Drama Desk Award and Tony Award nominations in 1989 for her performance in the Pulitzer Prize-winning play The Heidi Chronicles, Allen played First Lady Pat Nixon in director Oliver Stone's 1995 biographical film Nixon and was nominated for the Academy Award for Best Supporting Actress and the BAFTA Award for Best Actress in a Supporting Role. The following year, she appeared in the historical drama The Crucible as Elizabeth Proctor, a woman accused of witchcraft, and went on to receive nominations for her work in supporting actress categories at the Academy Awards and the Golden Globe Awards. Allen's portrayal of Eve Archer, the wife of an FBI agent cheated on by a man who has usurped her husband's identity, in the commercially successful action thriller Face/Off (1997) garnered her international mainstream recognition as well as a nomination for the Saturn Award for Best Supporting Actress. In 1998, her performance in the fantasy film Pleasantville brought her the Critics' Choice Movie Award for Best Supporting Actress and the Satellite Award for Best Supporting Actress – Comedy or Musical.

Allen starred in the political drama The Contender (2000) as Senator Laine Hanson, a vice presidential nominee who becomes the object of a scandal, and received nominations for the Academy Award for Best Actress, the Golden Globe Award for Best Actress in a Motion Picture – Drama, the Independent Spirit Award for Best Female Lead and the Screen Actors Guild Award for Outstanding Performance by a Female Actor in a Leading Role. In 2001, Allen played Morgause in the miniseries The Mists of Avalon and was nominated for the Primetime Emmy Award for Outstanding Supporting Actress in a Miniseries or a Movie. For her lead performance as an alcoholic housewife in the 2005 comedy The Upside of Anger, Allen earned a Critics' Choice Movie Award for Best Actress nomination. She returned to television in 2009 with the biographical film Georgia O'Keeffe, serving as its executive producer and also portraying the eponymous American modernist painter, a role for which she was bestowed with Golden Globe Award, Primetime Emmy Award and Screen Actors Guild Award nominations. Allen's appearance as Nancy Newsome in the 2015 drama Room won her the Canadian Screen Award for Best Supporting Actress.

== Awards and nominations ==
Awards and nominations
| Award | Year | Work | Category | Result | Ref. |
|---|---|---|---|---|---|
| Academy Awards | 1996 | Nixon | Best Supporting Actress | Nominated | |
| Academy Awards | 1997 | The Crucible | Best Supporting Actress | Nominated | |
| Academy Awards | 2001 | The Contender | Best Actress | Nominated | |
| Blockbuster Entertainment Awards | 1998 | Face/Off | Favorite Supporting Actress – Action or Adventure | Nominated | |
| Blockbuster Entertainment Awards | 2001 | The Contender | Favorite Actress – Drama | Nominated | |
| Boston Society of Film Critics | 1995 | Nixon | Best Supporting Actress | Won | |
| Boston Society of Film Critics | 1996 | The Crucible | Best Supporting Actress | Runner-up | |
| Boston Society of Film Critics | 1998 | Pleasantville | Best Supporting Actress | Won | |
| British Academy Film Awards | 1996 | Nixon | Best Actress in a Supporting Role | Nominated | |
| British Independent Film Awards | 2005 | Yes | Best Actress | Nominated | |
| Canadian Screen Awards | 2016 | Room | Best Supporting Actress | Won | |
| Chicago Film Critics Association | 1996 | Nixon | Best Supporting Actress | Won | |
| Chicago Film Critics Association | 1997 | The Crucible | Best Supporting Actress | Nominated | |
| Chicago Film Critics Association | 1998 | The Ice Storm | Best Supporting Actress | Nominated | |
| Chicago Film Critics Association | 1999 | Pleasantville | Best Supporting Actress | Nominated | |
| Chicago Film Critics Association | 2001 | The Contender | Best Actress | Nominated | |
| Chicago Film Critics Association | 2006 | The Upside of Anger | Best Actress | Won | |
| Chlotrudis Awards | 1999 | Pleasantville | Best Supporting Actress | Nominated | |
| Clarence Derwent Awards | 1984 | And a Nightingale Sang | Most Promising Female Performer – US | Won | |
| Critics' Choice Movie Awards | 1997 | The Crucible | Best Supporting Actress | Won | |
| Critics' Choice Movie Awards | 1999 | Pleasantville | Best Supporting Actress | Won (Note: Tied with Kathy Bates for Primary Colors (1998)) | |
| Critics' Choice Movie Awards | 2001 | The Contender | Alan J. Pakula Award (Note: Shared with Rod Lurie, Gary Oldman, Jeff Bridges, Christian Slater and Sam Elliott) | Won | |
| Critics' Choice Movie Awards | 2006 | The Upside of Anger | Best Actress | Nominated | |
| Dallas–Fort Worth Film Critics Association | 2001 | The Contender | Best Actress | Nominated | |
| Dallas–Fort Worth Film Critics Association | 2005 | The Upside of Anger | Best Actress | Nominated | |
| Drama Desk Awards | 1984 | And a Nightingale Sang | Outstanding Actress in a Play | Won | |
| Drama Desk Awards | 1986 | The Marriage of Bette and Boo | Outstanding Actress in a Play | Nominated | |
| Drama Desk Awards | 1989 | The Heidi Chronicles | Outstanding Actress in a Play | Nominated | |
| Drama-Logue Awards | 1987 | Burn This | Outstanding Performance (Note: Shared with Lou Liberatore and John Malkovich) | Won | |
| Empire Awards | 1998 | The Crucible | Best Actress | Won | |
| Florida Film Critics Circle | 1997 | The Crucible | Best Supporting Actress | Runner-up | |
| Golden Apple Awards | 2000 | — | Female Star of the Year | Won | |
| Golden Globe Awards | 1997 | The Crucible | Best Supporting Actress – Motion Picture | Nominated | |
| Golden Globe Awards | 2001 | The Contender | Best Actress in a Motion Picture – Drama | Nominated | |
| Golden Globe Awards | 2010 | Georgia O'Keeffe | Best Actress – Miniseries or Motion Picture Made for Television | Nominated | |
| Independent Spirit Awards | 2001 | The Contender | Best Female Lead | Nominated | |
| Jeff Awards (Equity) | 1983 | And a Nightingale Sang | Outstanding Actress in a Principal Role – Play | Won | |
| Jeff Awards (Equity) | 1986 | A Lesson from Aloes | Outstanding Actress in a Principal Role – Play | Won | |
| Jeff Awards (Equity) | 1990 | Reckless | Outstanding Actress in a Principal Role – Play | Nominated | |
| Kansas City Film Critics Circle | 1995 | Nixon | Best Supporting Actress | Won | |
| London Film Critics' Circle | 1999 | The Ice Storm | Actress of the Year | Nominated | |
| London Film Critics' Circle | 2007 | The Upside of Anger | Actress of the Year | Nominated | |
| Los Angeles Film Critics Association | 1995 | Nixon | Best Supporting Actress | Won | |
| Los Angeles Film Critics Association | 1998 | Pleasantville | Best Supporting Actress | Won | |
| Movies for Grownups Awards | 2006 | The Upside of Anger | Best Grownup Love Story (Note: Shared with Kevin Costner) | Nominated | |
| Movies for Grownups Awards | 2016 | Room | Best Supporting Actress | Nominated | |
| National Society of Film Critics | 1995 | Nixon | Best Supporting Actress | Won | |
| New York Film Critics Circle | 1995 | Nixon | Best Supporting Actress | Runner-up | |
| Obie Awards | 1985 | The Marriage of Bette and Boo | Distinguished Ensemble Performance (Note: Shared with the cast) | Won (Note: Tied with Charles Ludlam and Everett Quinton for The Mystery of Irma Vep (1984)) | |
| Online Film Critics Society | 1999 | Pleasantville | Best Supporting Actress | Won | |
| Online Film Critics Society | 2001 | The Contender | Best Actress | Nominated | |
| Online Film Critics Society | 2006 | The Upside of Anger | Best Actress | Nominated | |
| Outer Critics Circle Awards | 1984 | And a Nightingale Sang | Outstanding Debut Performance – Female | Won | |
| Outer Critics Circle Awards | 2019 | The Waverly Gallery | Outstanding Featured Actress in a Play | Nominated | |
| Primetime Emmy Awards | 2002 | The Mists of Avalon | Outstanding Supporting Actress in a Miniseries or a Movie | Nominated | |
| Primetime Emmy Awards | 2010 | Georgia O'Keeffe | Outstanding Made for Television Movie (Note: Shared with Joshua D. Maurer, Alixandre Witlin and Tony Mark) | Nominated | |
| Primetime Emmy Awards | 2010 | Georgia O'Keeffe | Outstanding Lead Actress in a Miniseries or a Movie | Nominated | |
| Producers Guild of America Awards | 2010 | Georgia O'Keeffe | Outstanding Producer of Long-Form Television | Nominated | |
| San Diego Film Critics Society | 2005 | The Upside of Anger | Best Actress | Won | |
| Satellite Awards | 1997 | The Crucible | Best Supporting Actress – Drama | Nominated | |
| Satellite Awards | 1998 | The Ice Storm | Best Actress – Drama | Nominated | |
| Satellite Awards | 1999 | Pleasantville | Best Supporting Actress – Comedy or Musical | Won | |
| Satellite Awards | 2001 | The Contender | Best Actress – Drama | Nominated | |
| Satellite Awards | 2005 | The Upside of Anger | Best Actress – Comedy or Musical | Nominated | |
| Saturn Awards | 1998 | Face/Off | Best Supporting Actress | Nominated | |
| Saturn Awards | 1999 | Pleasantville | Best Supporting Actress | Won | |
| Saturn Awards | 2009 | Death Race | Best Supporting Actress | Nominated | |
| Screen Actors Guild Awards | 1996 | Nixon | Outstanding Performance by a Female Actor in a Leading Role | Nominated | |
| Screen Actors Guild Awards | 1996 | Nixon | Outstanding Performance by a Cast in a Motion Picture | Nominated | |
| Screen Actors Guild Awards | 2001 | The Contender | Outstanding Performance by a Female Actor in a Leading Role | Nominated | |
| Screen Actors Guild Awards | 2010 | Georgia O'Keeffe | Outstanding Performance by a Female Actor in a Miniseries or Television Movie | Nominated | |
| Seattle International Film Festival | 2005 | Yes | Best Actress | Won | |
| ShoWest | 1998 | Face/Off and The Ice Storm | Supporting Actress of the Year | Won | |
| Society of Texas Film Critics | 1995 | Nixon | Best Supporting Actress | Won | |
| Teen Choice Awards | 1999 | Pleasantville | Funniest Scene (Note: Shared with Reese Witherspoon) | Nominated | |
| Theatre World Awards | 1984 | And a Nightingale Sang | Best Debut Performance | Won (Note: Tied with Martine Allard for The Tap Dance Kid (1983), Kathy Baker for Fool for Love (1983), Mark Capri for On Approval (1984), Laura Dean for Doonesbury (1983), Stephen Geoffreys and Bonnie Koloc for The Human Comedy (1983), Todd Graff for Baby (1983), Glenne Headly for The Philanthropist (1983), J. J. Johnston for American Buffalo (1983), Calvin Levels for Open Admissions (1984) and Robert Westenberg for Zorba (1983)) | |
| Tony Awards | 1988 | Burn This | Best Actress in a Play | Won | |
| Tony Awards | 1989 | The Heidi Chronicles | Best Actress in a Play | Nominated | |
| Vancouver Film Critics Circle | 2016 | Room | Best Supporting Actress in a Canadian Film | Nominated | |
| Washington D.C. Area Film Critics Association | 2005 | The Upside of Anger | Best Actress | Nominated | |

== Honors ==
Honors
| Awarding institution | Year | Honor | Ref. |
|---|---|---|---|
| Chicago International Film Festival | 2012 | Silver Hugo Career Achievement Award | |
| Costume Designers Guild | 2006 | Distinguished Actor Award | |
| Hamptons International Film Festival | 2003 | Golden Starfish Award for Career Achievement | |
| High Falls Film Festival | 2004 | Susan B. Anthony "Failure is Impossible" Award | |
| Jackson Wild | 2005 | Nellie Tayloe Ross Award | |
| Palm Springs International Film Festival | 2001 | Spotlight Award | |
| San Francisco International Film Festival | 2005 | Peter J. Owens Award | |
