= Everyman =

Stock character; an ordinary individual

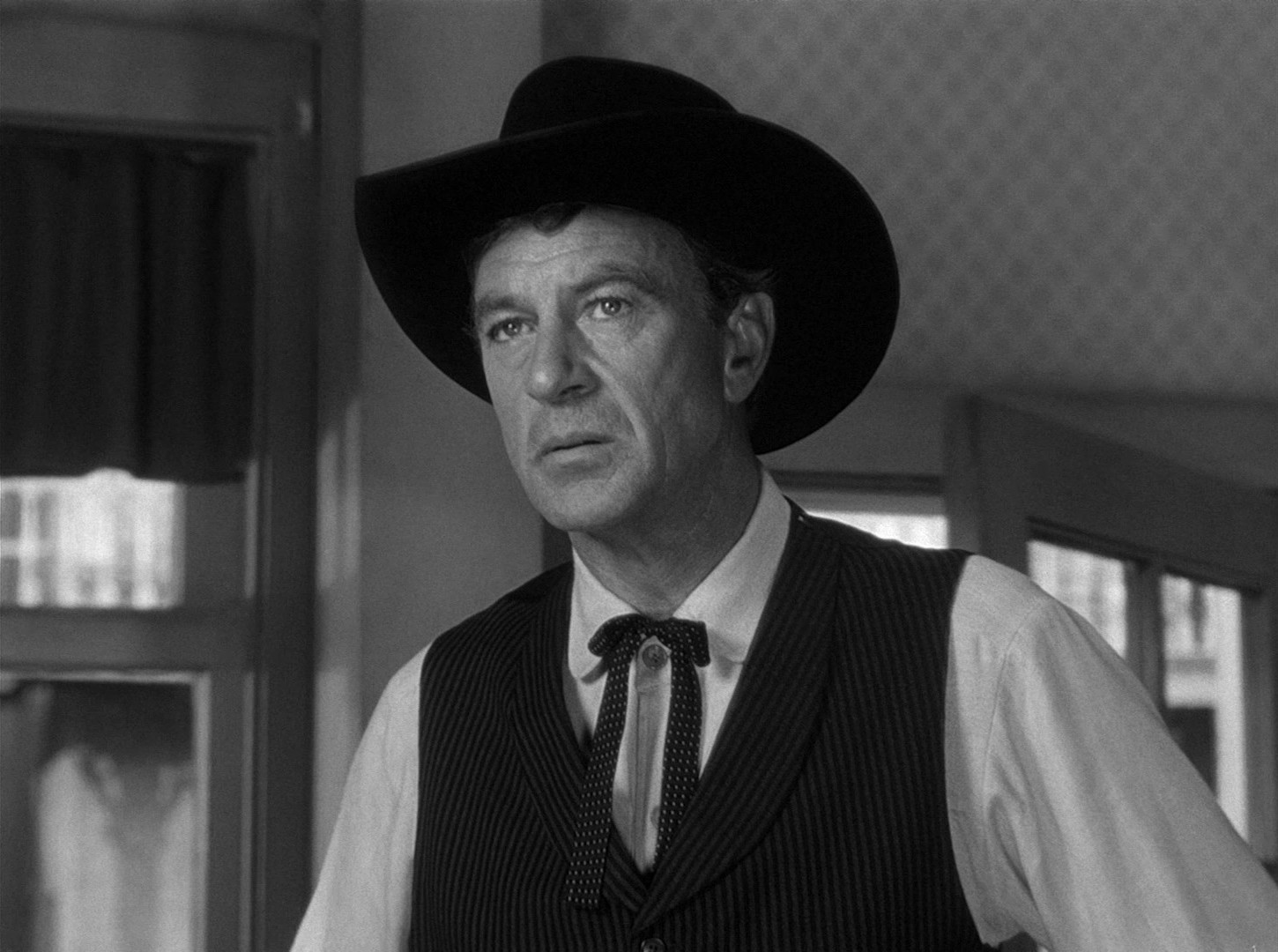
Actor Gary Cooper served as an idealized everyman during the "golden age of Hollywood", appearing as the protagonist in movies such as 1952's High Noon.

The everyman is a stock character of fiction. An ordinary and humble character, the everyman is generally a protagonist whose benign conduct fosters the audience's identification with them.

== Origin and history ==
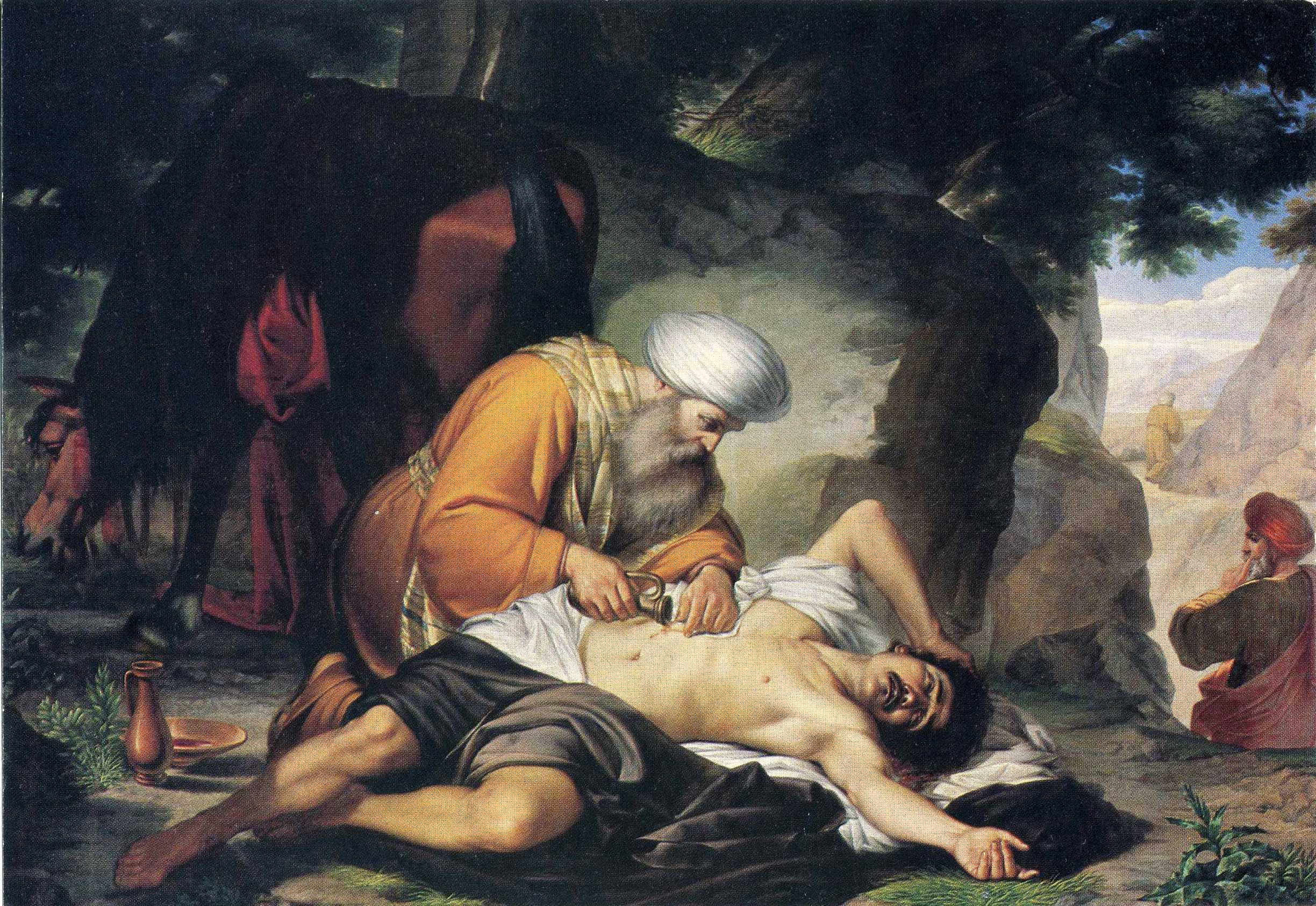
The Parable of the Good Samaritan features an everyman type character who suffers but receives compassion at the hands of the Samaritan.

The term everyman was used as early as an English morality play from the early 16th century: The Summoning of Everyman. The play's protagonist is an allegorical character representing an ordinary human who knows he is soon to die; according to literature scholar Harry Keyishian he is portrayed as "prosperous, gregarious, [and] attractive". Everyman is the only human character of the play; the others are embodied ideas such as Fellowship, who "symbolizes the transience and limitations of human friendship".

The use of the term everyman to refer generically to a portrayal of an ordinary or typical person dates to the early 20th century. The term everywoman originates in the same period, having been used by George Bernard Shaw to describe the character Ann Whitefield of his play Man and Superman.

== Narrative uses ==
An everyman is described with the intent that most audience members can readily identify with him. Although the everyman may face the same difficulties that a hero might, archetypal heroes react rapidly and vigorously by manifest action, whereas an everyman typically avoids engagement or reacts ambivalently until the situation, grows dire, demanding immediate and effective reaction to avert disaster. Such a "round", dynamic character—that is, a character showing complexity and development—is generally a protagonist.

Or if lacking complexity and development—thus a "flat", static character—then the everyman is a secondary character. Especially in literature, there is often a narrator, as the written medium enables extensive explication of, for example, previous events, internal details, and mental content. An everyman narrator may be noticed little, whether by other characters or sometimes even by the reader. A narrating everyman, like Ché in the musical Evita, may even address the audience directly.

== List of examples ==
- Leopold Bloom of James Joyce's novel Ulysses (serialized 1918–1920, published in its entirety in 1922)
- The anonymous narrator of Chuck Palahniuk's novel Fight Club (1996) and its movie adaptation (1999)
- C.C. "Bud" Baxter of Billy Wilder's movie The Apartment (1960).
- Emmet Brickowski of The Lego Movie
- Charlie Brown of Charles Schulz's comic strip Peanuts.
- Ché in Tim Rice and Andrew Lloyd Webber's musical Evita
- Christian of John Bunyan's book The Pilgrim's Progress (1678).
- Arthur Dent of Douglas Adams' novel The Hitchhiker's Guide to the Galaxy.
- Fred Flintstone of "The Flintstones"
- John Candy's various roles, particularly in "Stripes", "Summer Rental", "Planes, Trains, and Automobiles", and " The Great Outdoors", and his starring role on "Camp Candy"
- James Gordon in DC Comics.
- Jim Halpert in The Office
- Jonathan Harker of Bram Stoker's novel Dracula (1897).
- George Jetson of The Jetsons
- Homer Simpson of "The Simpsons"
- Philip J. Fry of "Futurama"
- Will Kane of Fred Zinnemann's movie High Noon (1952).
- Jacob Kowalski of J. K. Rowling's Fantastic Beasts and Where to Find Them movies.
- Stan Marsh of South Park
- Marty McFly of Back to the Future
- Ted Mosby of the television series How I Met Your Mother.
- Winston Smith in George Orwell's novel Nineteen Eighty-Four (1949)
- Egbert Souse in Edward F. Cline's film The Bank Dick (1940)

== See also ==
- Average Joe – wholly average person
- Commoner – person neither nobility, royalty, nor priesthood
- Elckerlijc – Dutch medieval morality play
- Everyman's right – freedom to roam
- Joe Bloggs – British generic average man
- John Doe – generic everyman used in English-speaking countries
- John Q. Public – generic, hypothetical "common man"
- Kafkaesque – everyman being overwhelmed by vast, dehumanizing social labyrinth
- Man on the Bondi tram – hypothetical reasonable Australian
- Person having ordinary skill in the art
- Reasonable person – term helping a jury interpret a law's wording
- Straight man
- T.C. Mits – acronym for "the celebrated man in the street"
- The man on the Clapham omnibus – hypothetical reasonable person
- Zé Povinho – Portuguese everyman
