= Broadcast Film Critics Association Awards 1997 =

Broadcast Film Critics Association Awards 1997 may refer to:

- 2nd Critics' Choice Awards, the second Critics' Choice Awards ceremony that took place in 1997
- 3rd Critics' Choice Awards, the third Critics' Choice Awards ceremony that took place in 1998 and which honored the best in film for 1997
