= Broadcast Film Critics Association Awards 1998 =

Broadcast Film Critics Association Awards 1997 may refer to:

- 3rd Critics' Choice Awards, the third Critics' Choice Awards ceremony that took place in 1998
- 4th Critics' Choice Awards, the fourth Critics' Choice Awards ceremony that took place in 1999 and which honored the best in film for 1998
