= The Contender (2000 film) =

2000 film by Rod Lurie

- Theatrical release poster
- Directed by: Rod Lurie
- Written by: Rod Lurie
- Produced by: Marc Frydman; Douglas Urbanski; Willi Baer; James Spies
- Starring: Gary Oldman; Joan Allen; Jeff Bridges; Christian Slater; William Petersen; Philip Baker Hall; Saul Rubinek; Sam Elliott
- Cinematography: Denis Maloney
- Edited by: Michael Jablow
- Music by: Larry Groupé
- Production companies: Cinerenta; Battleground Productions; SE8 Group; Cinecontender Productions
- Distributed by: DreamWorks Pictures
- Release date: 13 October 2000
- Running time: 126 minutes
- Countries: United States; Germany; United Kingdom
- Language: English
- Budget: $20 million
- Box office: $22.4 million

The Contender is a 2000 political drama film written and directed by Rod Lurie, and starring Gary Oldman, Joan Allen, Jeff Bridges and Christian Slater. The film focuses on a fictional United States president (Bridges) and the events surrounding his appointment of a new vice president (Allen).

The film serves as a response to the Lewinsky scandal involving President Bill Clinton. It became the subject of controversy regarding alterations that were alleged to have displeased Oldman, who co-produced. The film enjoyed box office success in the US and received two Academy Award nominations; Joan Allen was nominated for Best Actress and Jeff Bridges for Best Supporting Actor at the Academy Awards.

== Plot ==
Second-term Democratic U.S. President Jackson Evans must select a new Vice President following the sudden death of his vice president, Troy Ellard. The obvious choice seems to be Virginia Governor Jack Hathaway, who is hailed as a hero after he recently dove into a lake in a failed attempt to save a drowning woman. The President instead decides that his "swan song" will be helping to break the glass ceiling by nominating Ohio Senator Laine Hanson. In accordance with the 25th Amendment to the Constitution, approval from both houses of Congress is required. Standing in her way is Republican Congressman Sheldon Runyon of Illinois, who believes she is unqualified for the position, and backs Hathaway for the nod. His investigation into her background turns up an incident where she was apparently photographed participating in a drunken orgy as part of a sorority initiation. He is joined in his opposition by Democratic Representative Reginald Webster.

The confirmation hearings begin in Washington, D.C., and Runyon, who chairs the committee, quickly addresses Hanson's alleged sexual imbroglio. Hanson refuses to address the incident, neither confirming nor denying anything, and tries to turn the discussion towards political issues. Anticipating that Hanson would deem her personal past "none of anyone's business", Runyon starts rumors in the media saying that the sexual escapade in college was done in exchange for money and favors, making it prostitution.

Hanson meets with Evans and offers to withdraw her name, to save his administration more embarrassment. Despite the wishes of the administration, she refuses to fight back or even address Runyon's charges, arguing that to answer the questions dignifies them being asked in the first place—something she does not believe. Evans meets with Runyon, informing him he will not choose Hanson as vice president. Runyon casually brings forward Hathaway as a replacement. They make an agreement that Runyon will back down on his attacks if Evans chooses Hathaway as vice president. However, Evans requests Runyon to make a public statement defending Hathaway, which Runyon agrees to do.

Hanson, Hathaway, and Runyon are all invited to the White House where Evans shocks them with an FBI report revealing that Hathaway paid the woman to drive off the bridge. Hathaway is arrested and Runyon is disgraced because he vouched for Hathaway's integrity just hours earlier. Evans meets with Hanson, and she finally tells what actually happened that night in college. She said that she did indeed arrive at a fraternity house to have sex with two men as part of an initiation, but changed her mind before any sex occurred. However, she did not prove her innocence, citing that by doing so will further the idea that it was acceptable to ask the questions in the first place. Evans addresses Congress, where he chastises all Democrats and Republicans who blocked Hanson's confirmation. He explicitly lambasts Runyon, who leaves in humiliation. Although he declares that Hanson had asked for her nomination to be withdrawn so he could finish his presidency with triumph over controversy, he remains adamant by rejecting her resignation and calls for an immediate confirmation vote.

== Cast ==
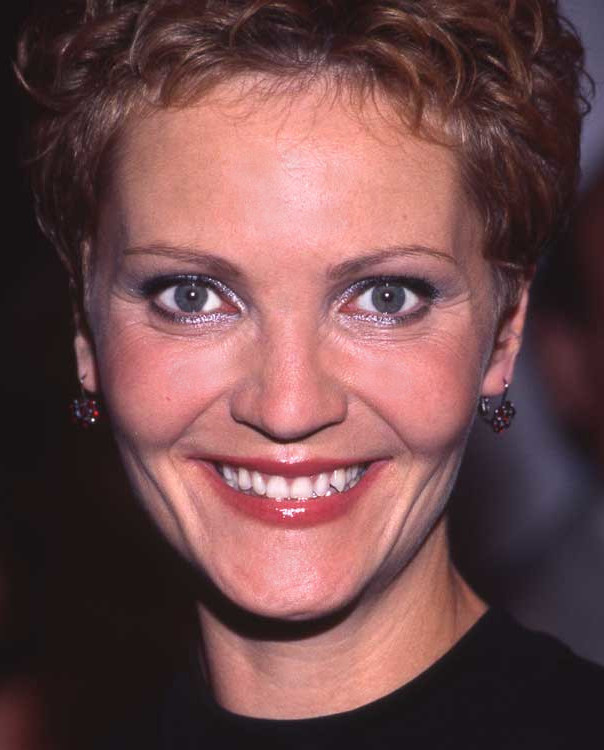
The part of Laine Hanson was written for actress Joan Allen

Actor	Character	Role
Gary Oldman	Sheldon Runyon	(R-IL) Representative, chairman of the House Judiciary Committee
Joan Allen	Laine Billings Hanson	(D-OH) Senator, vice presidential nominee
Jeff Bridges	Jackson Evans	(D) President of the United States
Christian Slater	Reginald Webster	(D-DE) Representative, House Judiciary Committee member
Sam Elliott	Kermit Newman	White House Chief of Staff
William Petersen	Jack Hathaway	(D-VA) Governor of Virginia
Saul Rubinek	Jerry Toliver	White House Press Secretary
Philip Baker Hall	Oscar Billings	(R-OH) former Governor of Ohio, Laine Hanson's father
Mike Binder	Lewis Hollis	Laine Hanson's legal counsel
Robin Thomas	William Hanson	Campaign manager, Laine Hanson's husband
Kathryn Morris	Paige Willomina	FBI Special Agent
Kristen Shaw	Fiona Hathaway	Jack Hathaway's wife
Mariel Hemingway	Cynthia Charlton Lee	William Hanson's ex-wife

== Production ==
=== Development ===
Director Rod Lurie said he wrote the screenplay because he wished to make a film starring Joan Allen, and wrote the part of Laine Hanson with her in mind. Having a fascination with politics, and inspired by his daughter, he wished to make a feminist film that would differ from Allen's frequent role as troubled wife. At the time, the Lewinsky scandal was in the news, and actor Jeff Bridges acknowledged the story was a response to it. In writing the screenplay, Lurie considered a number of possible endings, including one in which Laine is assassinated. However, he wanted to give a message of hope to his daughter and audiences.

Actor Gary Oldman decided to produce the film, attracted to the screenplay which he felt was reminiscent of All the President's Men (1976). He did not see Sheldon Runyon as a villain, and Lurie claimed he was not written to be one. Oldman's manager Douglas Urbanski noted they independently produced the film before DreamWorks became involved.

=== Casting ===
Before approaching Jeff Bridges for the part of President Evans, Lurie submitted the screenplay to Paul Newman, reflecting how the character was envisioned to be older than he is in the final film. Newman turned down the role, which Lurie attributed to the actor's retirement. Bridges also sings the song featured in the beginning of the film.

Lurie wanted Sam Elliott for the part of Kermit, despite skepticism that he was best known for playing cowboys. Christian Slater joined the cast, saying he was interested in the screenplay's discussion of principles. Jessica Lange was cast but had to drop out due to personal commitments.

=== Filming ===
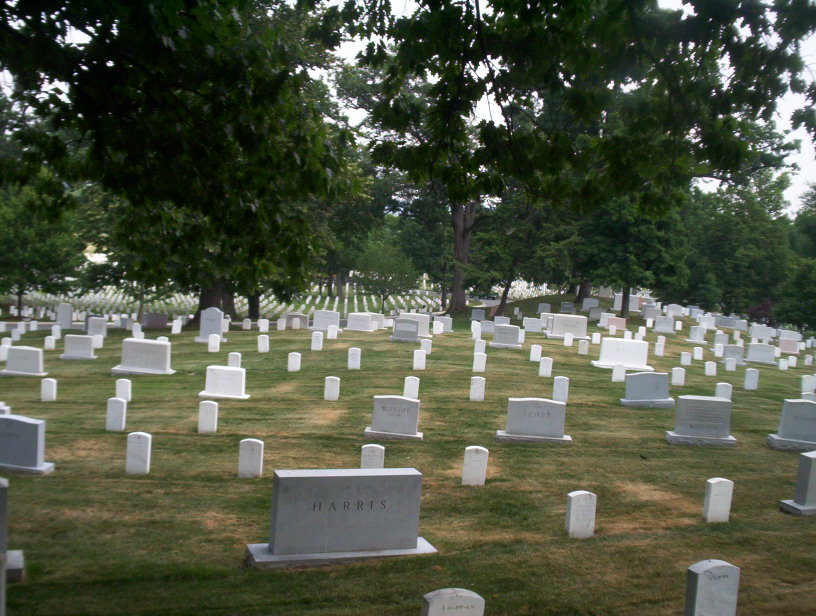
Arlington National Cemetery in Virginia was recreated in the film.

The scene where Laine is interviewed by Larry King was shot before principal photography. False gravestones were made for a set recreating Arlington National Cemetery in Virginia, with many of the markers having the same name, while The Washington Post gave permission for shooting in their office for one scene.

A number of scenes were filmed during rain, but this precipitation does not appear in the film because a severe amount is needed to be visible. In one such scene, before Laine is announced as vice presidential nominee, a typhoon was forecast, and Lurie's assistant from India performed a religious ritual to ward it off, which the director credited with working. The scene where Laine debates abortion with the House Judiciary Committee is directly influenced by The Manchurian Candidate (1962).

In the scene where Allen is riding by supporters in a car, few extras attended the shot, which lasted only 15 minutes. As a result, a number of crew members were costumed and stood in.

=== Post-production ===
After the film was nearly completed, Lurie received a phone call saying producer Steven Spielberg was interested in the project. Spielberg's DreamWorks eventually paid $9 million to acquire the film's domestic distribution rights. Lurie and Allen said it was the first time DreamWorks acquired a film the company had not produced.

Lurie said nearly 30 minutes of footage was deleted because it did not reflect intended themes of principles and leadership. Based on lack of enthusiasm in test screenings to the final scene where Laine addresses the House Judiciary Committee, and with Spielberg's advice, Lurie added music intended to be inspirational, which did receive a better response from test audiences.

== Release ==
The film was screened in Toronto International Film Festival in September 2000, and premiered in Los Angeles on 6 October. After a wider release on 14 October, it generated over $5 million during its opening weekend.

The film finished its run with a total domestic gross of $17,872,723, which was seen by domestic distributor DreamWorks as a box office success. It earned $22,361,811 worldwide.

== Reception ==
=== Critical reception ===
The Contender holds an overall approval rating of 77% on the review aggregator website Rotten Tomatoes based on 132 reviews, with an average rating of 6.7/10. The site's critical consensus reads, "The Contender wears its political heart on its sleeve, but strong performances and a solid screenplay help the result add up to a gripping drama from either side of the aisle". On Metacritic, the film has a weighted average score of 59 out of 100 based on 35 critics, indicating "mixed or average reviews".

Roger Ebert gave the film four stars out of four, calling it "one of those rare movies where you leave the theater having been surprised and entertained, and then start arguing". Emanuel Levy wrote in Variety that Lurie was improving as a director and screenwriter, but the film was "too obvious and verbose". Lisa Schwarzbaum gave the film a B− in Entertainment Weekly, saying Bridges emulated Bill Clinton in "charisma, charm, appetite", and that "The Contender booms and pontificates, full of bravado and that ineffable quality of the current political season, chutzpah", but "only pretends to be enlightened, liberal". Rolling Stone's Peter Travers called the film "a lively, entertaining ride" before descending into partisanship. In The Chicago Tribune, Michael Wilmington called it "a smart, tense political drama about presidential politics". Bob Graham of the San Francisco Chronicle praised Allen and Bridges. Stephen Hunter of The Washington Post wrote, "As entertainment of a tawdry but compelling sort, The Contender certainly delivers", but found Allen's character uninspiring.

In 2003, critic J. Hoberman assessed the film to be a feminist attack on double standards, in which "unbridled female sexuality" is perceived as a threat to the system. Hoberman concluded then-Senator Hillary Clinton was more the contender than 2000 presidential candidate Al Gore, and that the film was "a prophecy of 2004". Author Harry Keyishian wrote the ending, in which it appears Laine will be confirmed despite her civic religion, is unrealistic, and "swelling music replaces logic and probability". M. Keith Booker called it "a surprisingly complex film", in which Runyon is a villain who stands by his principles, while Evans is heroic despite being "a savvy politician", a harder man than what the public sees. In 2009, Gary Susman of Entertainment Weekly named Evans as one of the 10 greatest fictional presidents.

After viewing The Contender, actor Dustin Hoffman placed a telephone call to Oldman to commend his work in the film.

=== Controversy ===
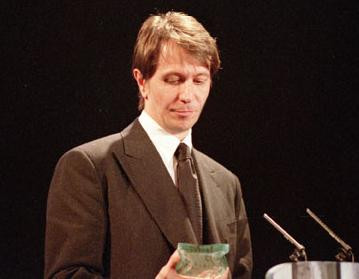
Producer and actor Gary Oldman became the subject of political controversy in the film.

The film has also been the subject of controversy. In an October 2000 issue of Premiere magazine, Oldman supposedly alleged that editing cuts were made due to the studio's Democratic leanings. Oldman and his co-producer, Urbanski, reportedly accused the DreamWorks studio and director Rod Lurie of editing the original film to make it more Democrat-biased, mainly by making the Runyon character less sympathetic than was originally intended.

However, Oldman stated in other interviews that his criticisms were only directed at Lurie and that the quote was "bastardized, kinda" when reprinted on Internet sources. He went on to complain that his issue with the film was how it became progressively less "ambiguous" as the editing went on, specifically citing the music as a problem in turning it into a film about "good guys and bad guys". Roger Ebert stated that Oldman's denunciation of the film never happened, and quoted Urbanski as saying Oldman is "the least political person I know" and taking credit for producing the film independently from DreamWorks, which eventually adopted it.

=== Accolades ===
Award	Date of ceremony	Category	Recipient(s)	Result	Ref(s)
Academy Awards	March 25, 2001	Best Actress	Joan Allen	Nominated	
Academy Awards	March 25, 2001	Best Supporting Actor	Jeff Bridges	Nominated	
Broadcast Film Critics Association	January 22, 2001	Alan J. Pakula Award	Rod Lurie and cast	Won	
Golden Globes	January 21, 2001	Best Actress in a Motion Picture – Drama	Joan Allen	Nominated	
Golden Globes	January 21, 2001	Best Supporting Actor	Jeff Bridges	Nominated	
Independent Spirit Awards	March 24, 2001	Best Female Lead	Joan Allen	Nominated	
Independent Spirit Awards	March 24, 2001	Best Supporting Male	Gary Oldman	Nominated	
Satellite Awards	January 14, 2001	Best Actress – Motion Picture	Joan Allen	Nominated	
Satellite Awards	January 14, 2001	Best Supporting Actor – Motion Picture	Jeff Bridges	Nominated	
Screen Actors Guild	March 11, 2001	Outstanding Female Actor	Joan Allen	Nominated	
Screen Actors Guild	March 11, 2001	Outstanding Male Supporting Actor	Jeff Bridges	Nominated	
Screen Actors Guild	March 11, 2001	Outstanding Male Supporting Actor	Gary Oldman	Nominated	
