= Critics' Choice Movie Award for Best Supporting Actress =

Award given by the Broadcast Film Critics Association

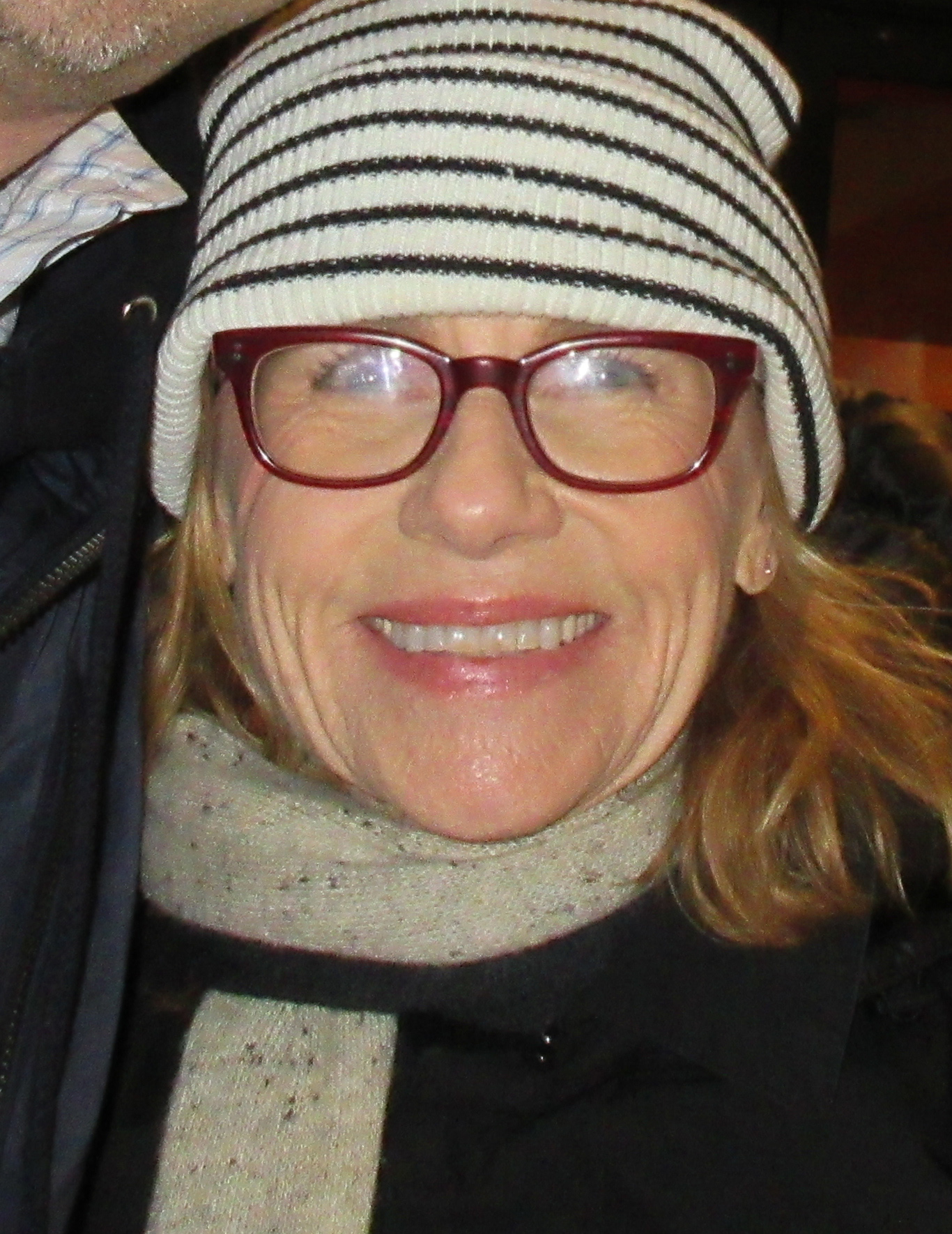
- The 2025 recipient: Amy Madigan
- Awarded for: Best Performance by an Actress in a Supporting Role
- Location: Los Angeles, California
- Presented by: Critics Choice Association
- Currently held by: Amy Madigan for Weapons (2025)
- Website: www.criticschoice.com

The Critics' Choice Movie Award for Best Supporting Actress is an award given out at the annual Critics' Choice Movie Awards. The awards are presented by the Critics Choice Association (CCA), and were first presented in 1995 with Mira Sorvino being the first recipient for her role in Mighty Aphrodite. There were no official nominees announced until 2001. There have been two ties in this category (1998, 2005), and there are currently six nominees annually.

Joan Allen is the only actress who has received this award more than once, with two wins. Amy Adams holds the record of most nomination in the category with four.

== Winners and nominees ==
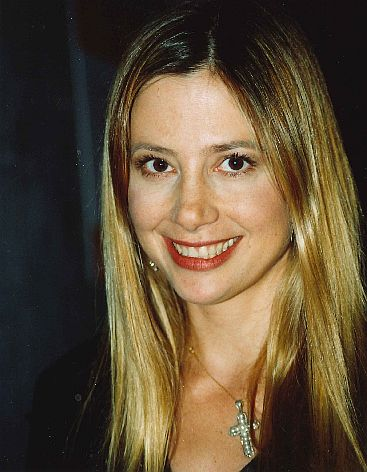
Mira Sorvino is the first recipient of this award in 1995

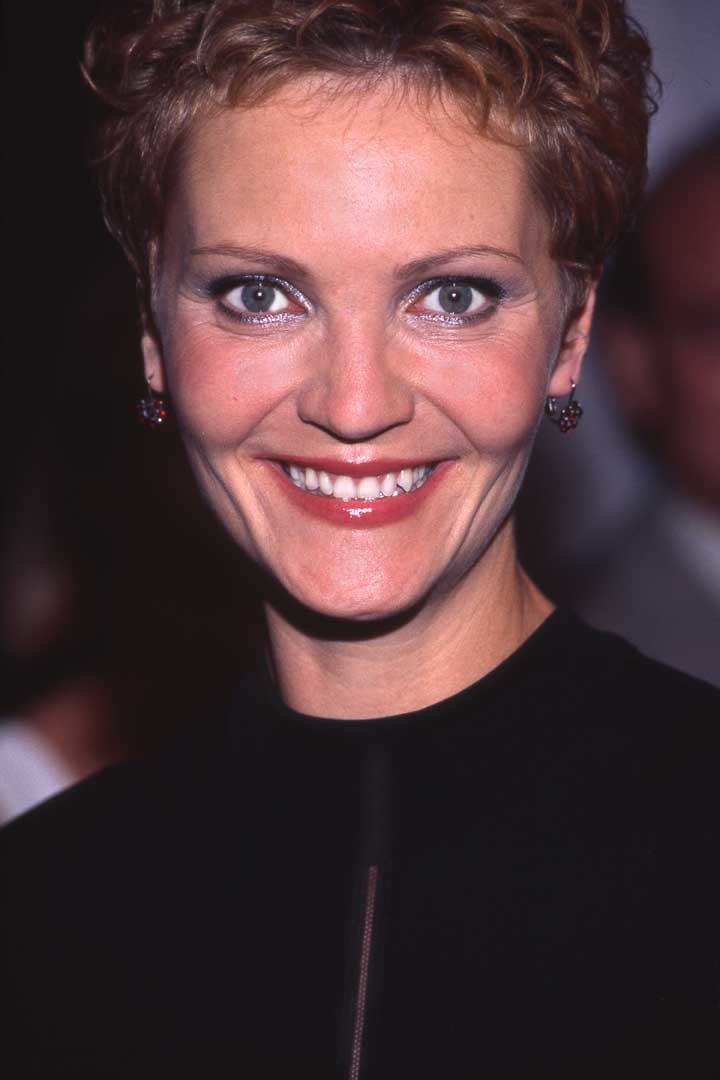
Joan Allen won twice for The Crucible (1996) and Pleasantville (1998)

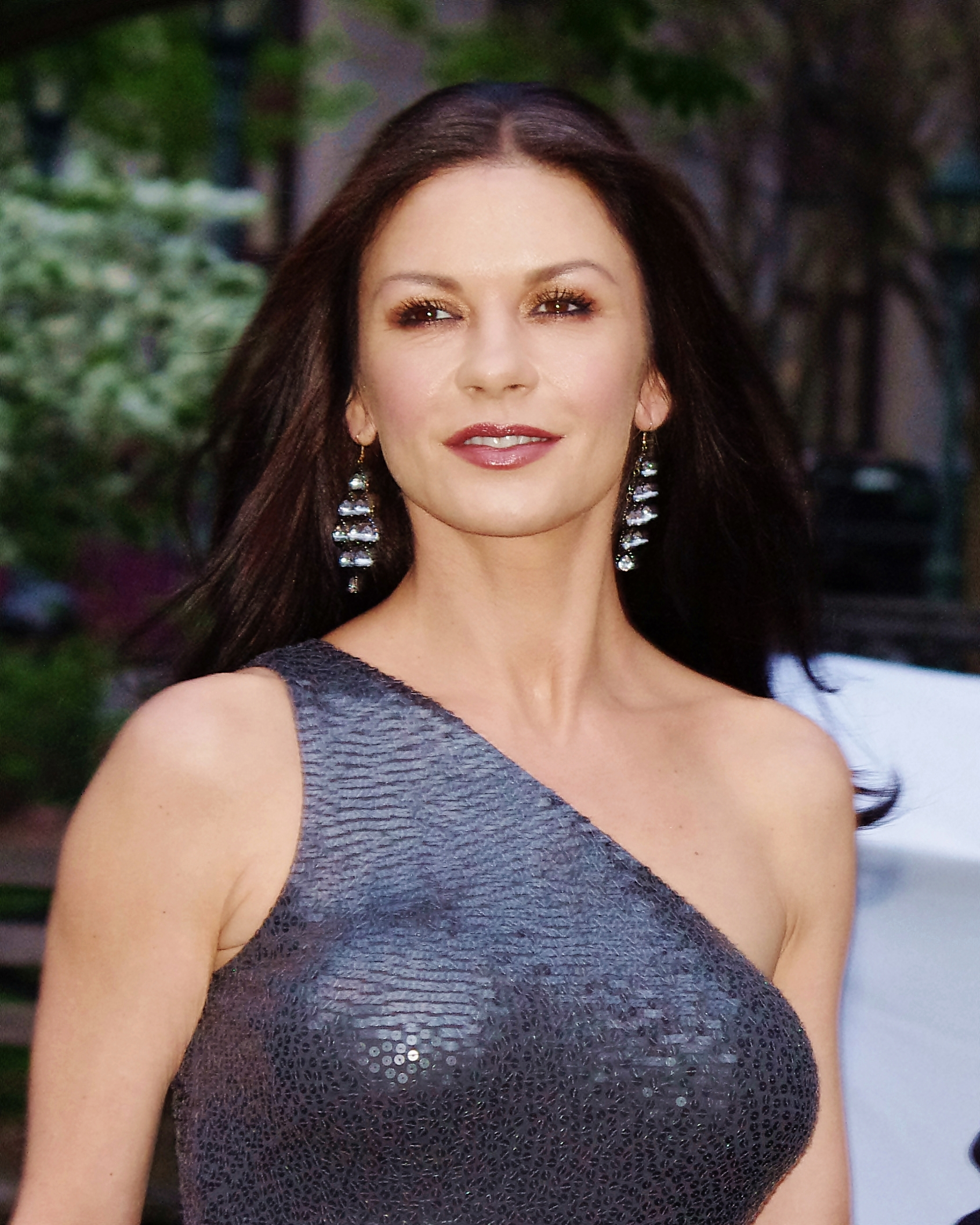
Catherine Zeta-Jones won for Chicago (2002)

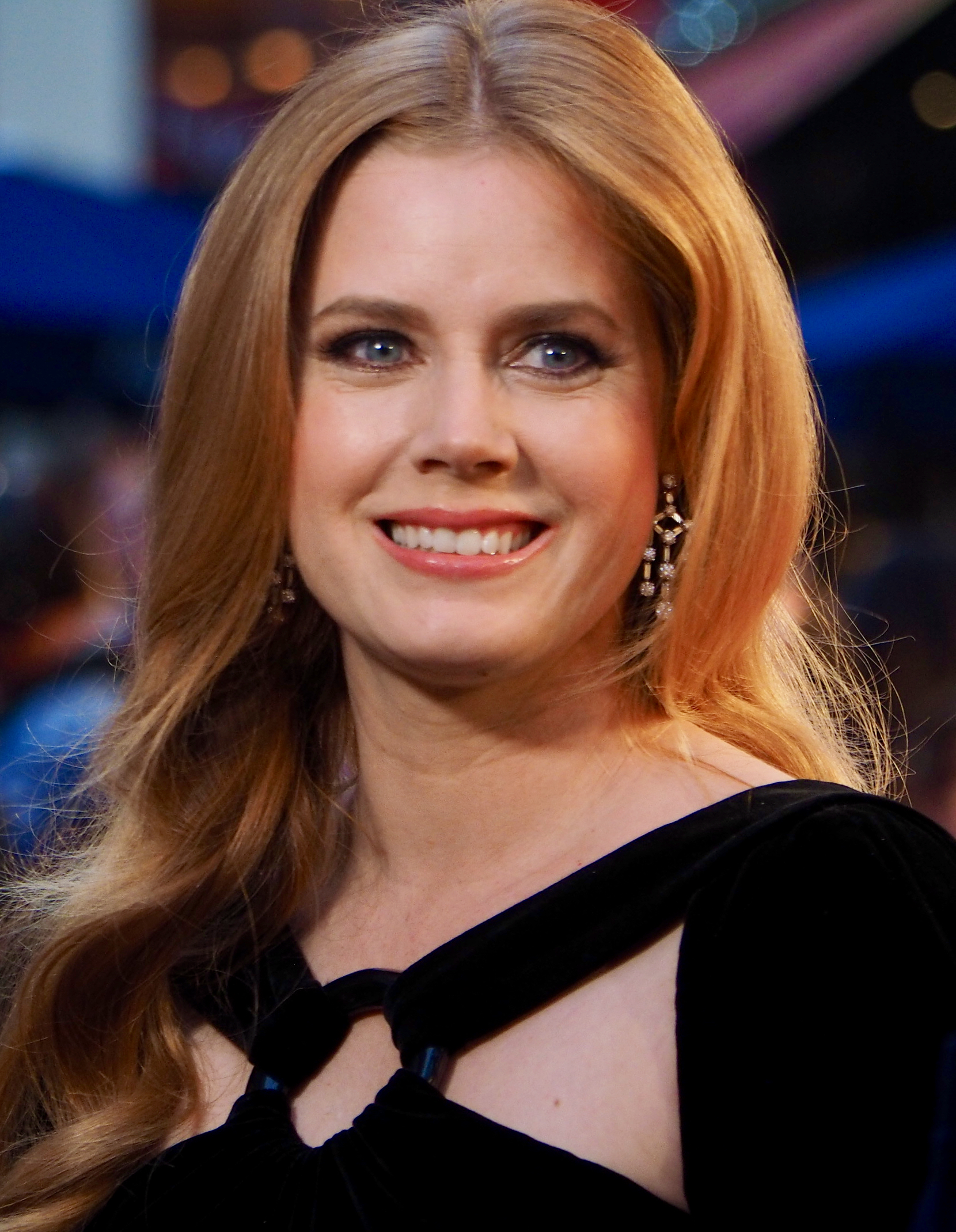
Amy Adams won for Junebug (2005)

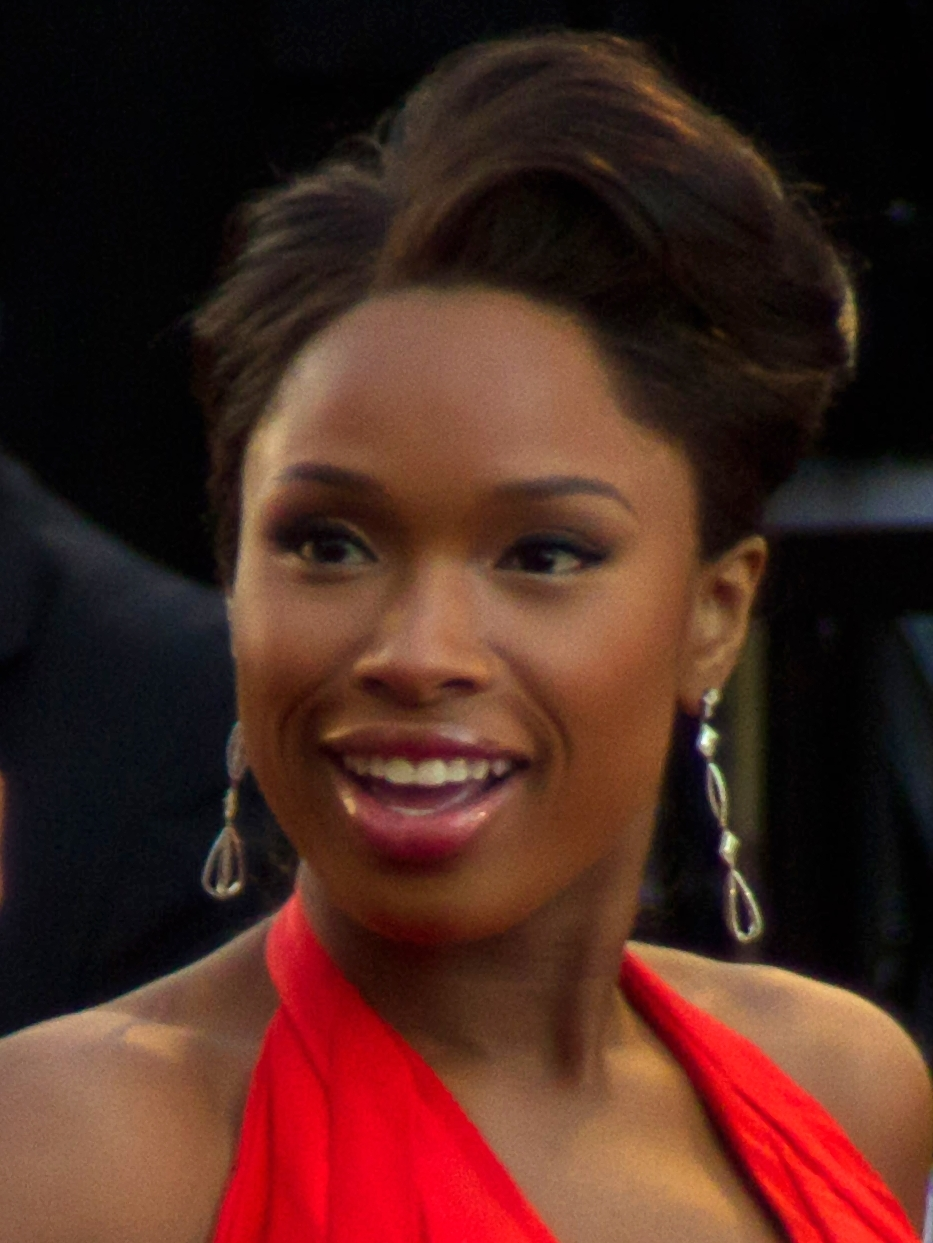
Jennifer Hudson won for Dreamgirls (2006)

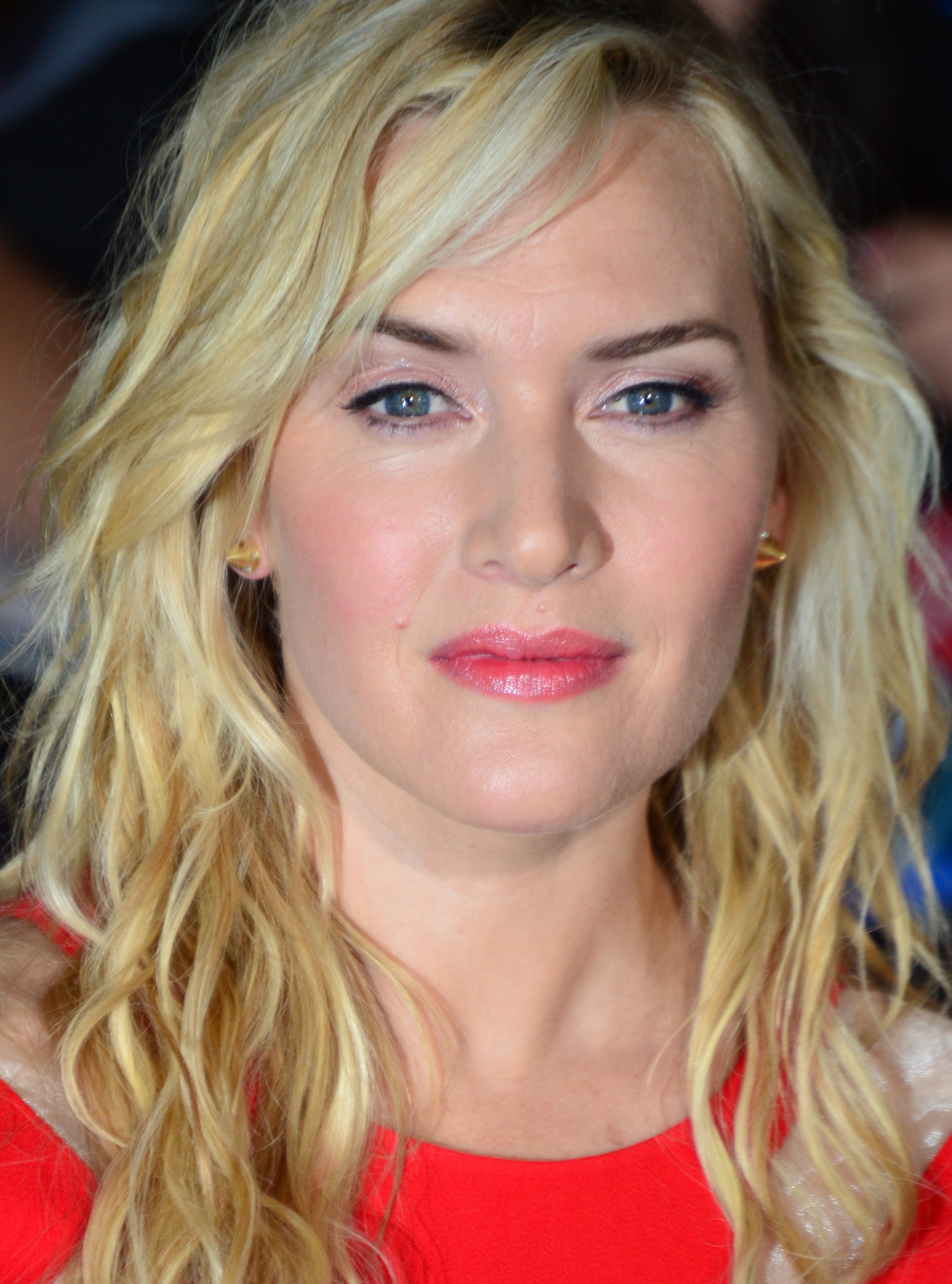
Kate Winslet won for The Reader (2008)

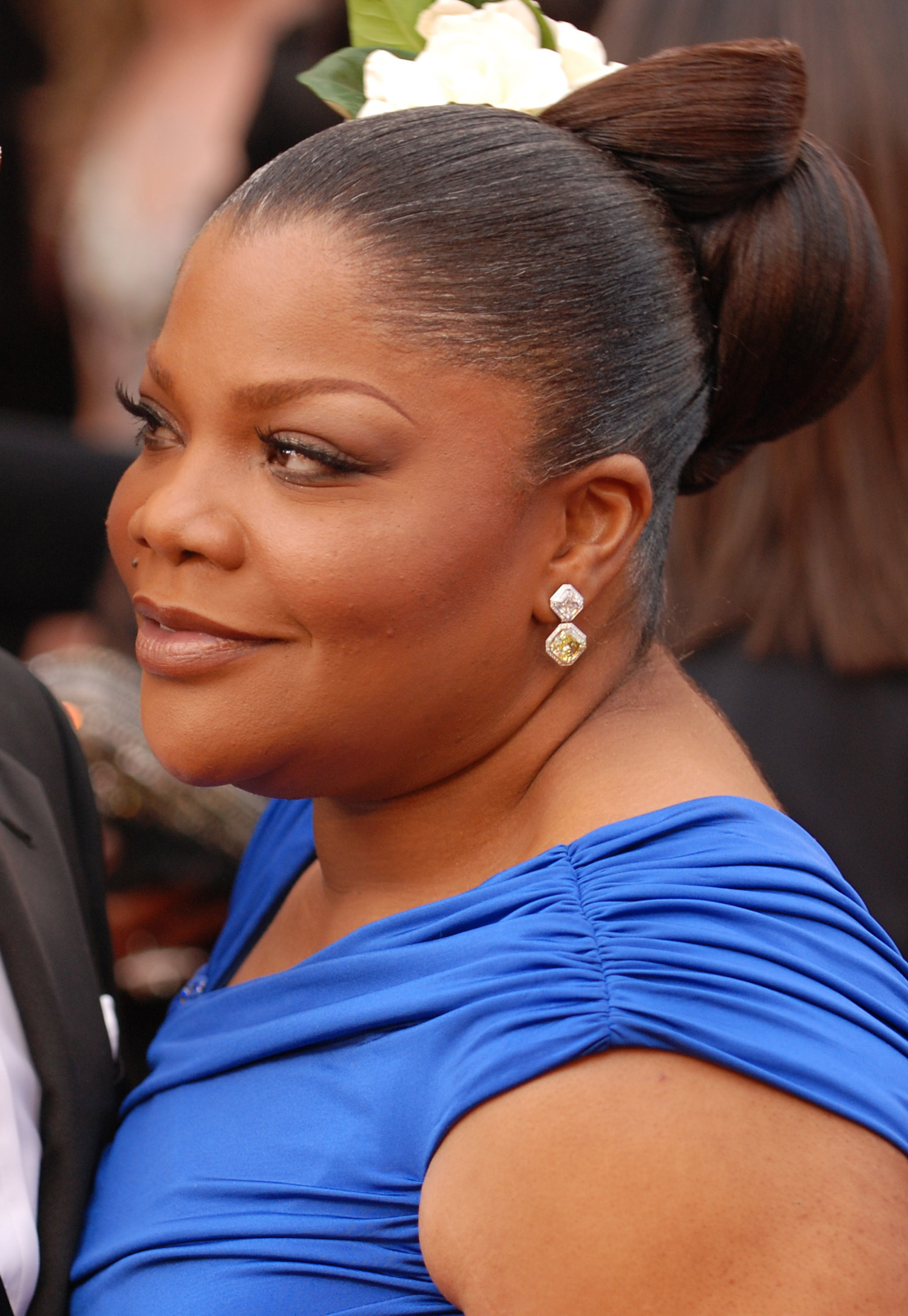
Mo'Nique won for Precious (2009

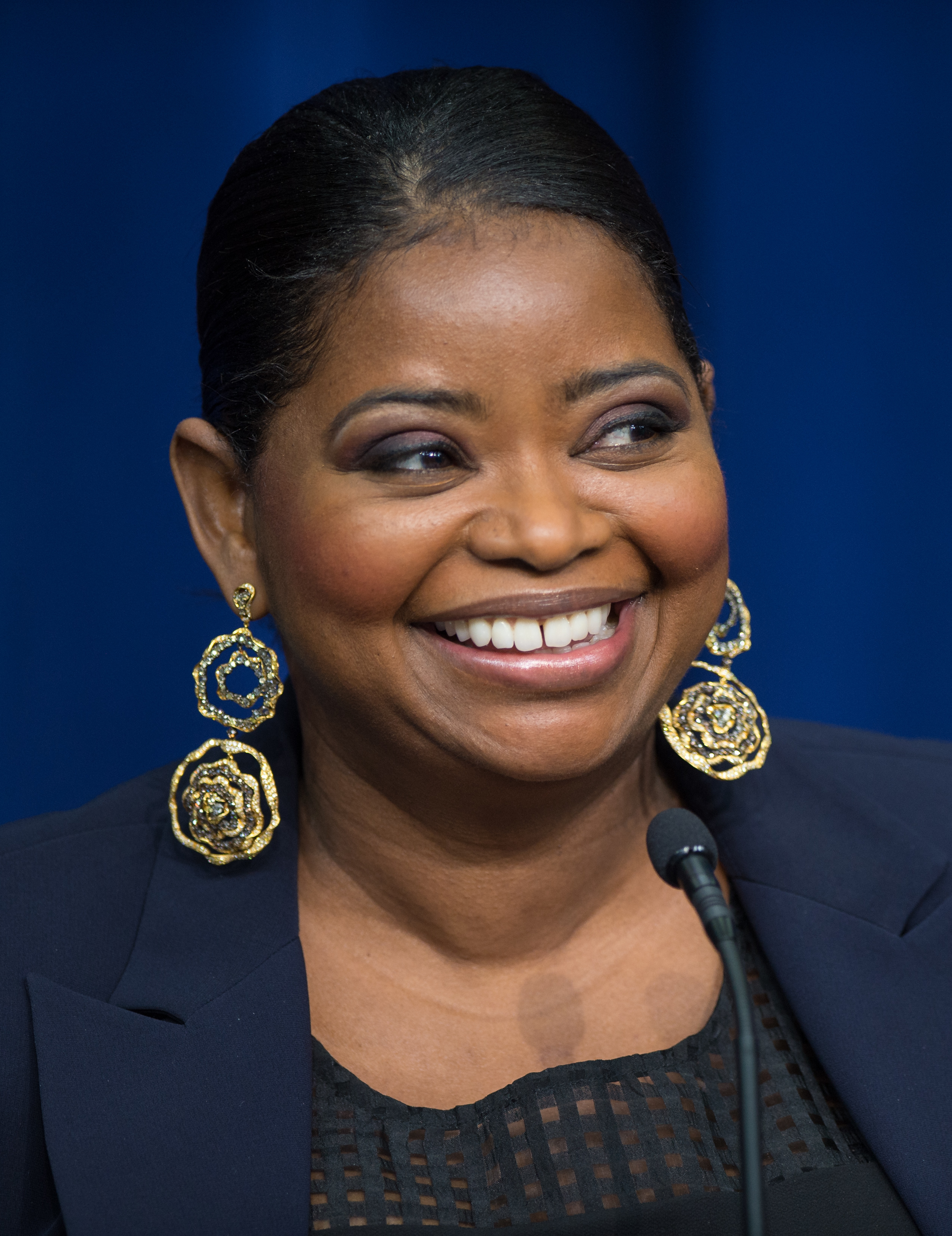
Octavia Spencer won for The Help (2011)

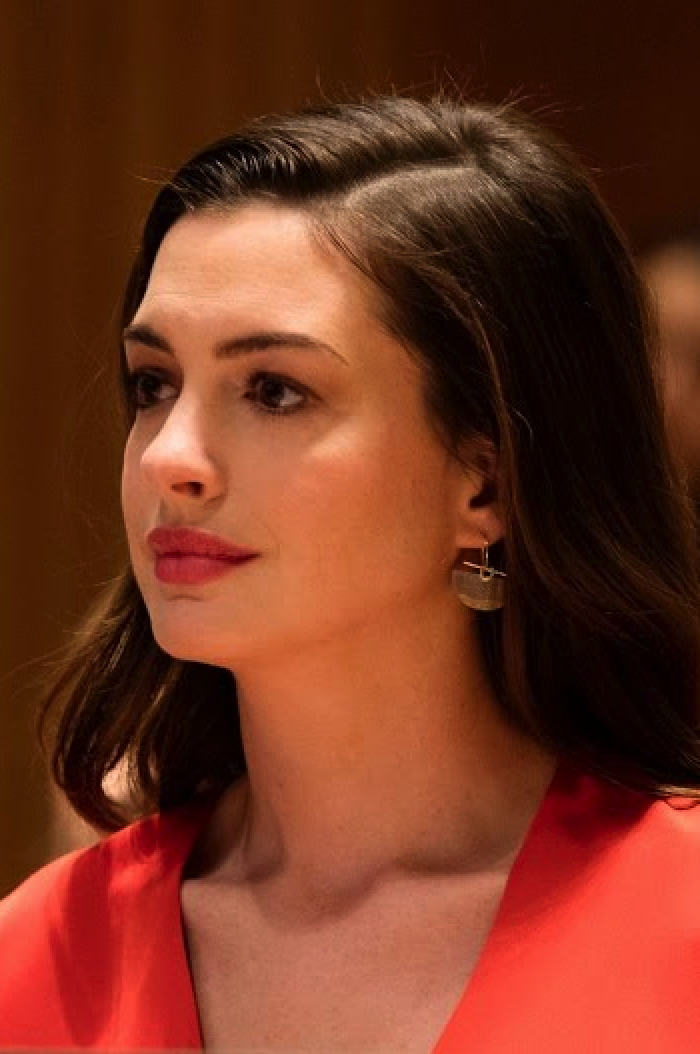
Anne Hathaway won for Les Misérables (2012)

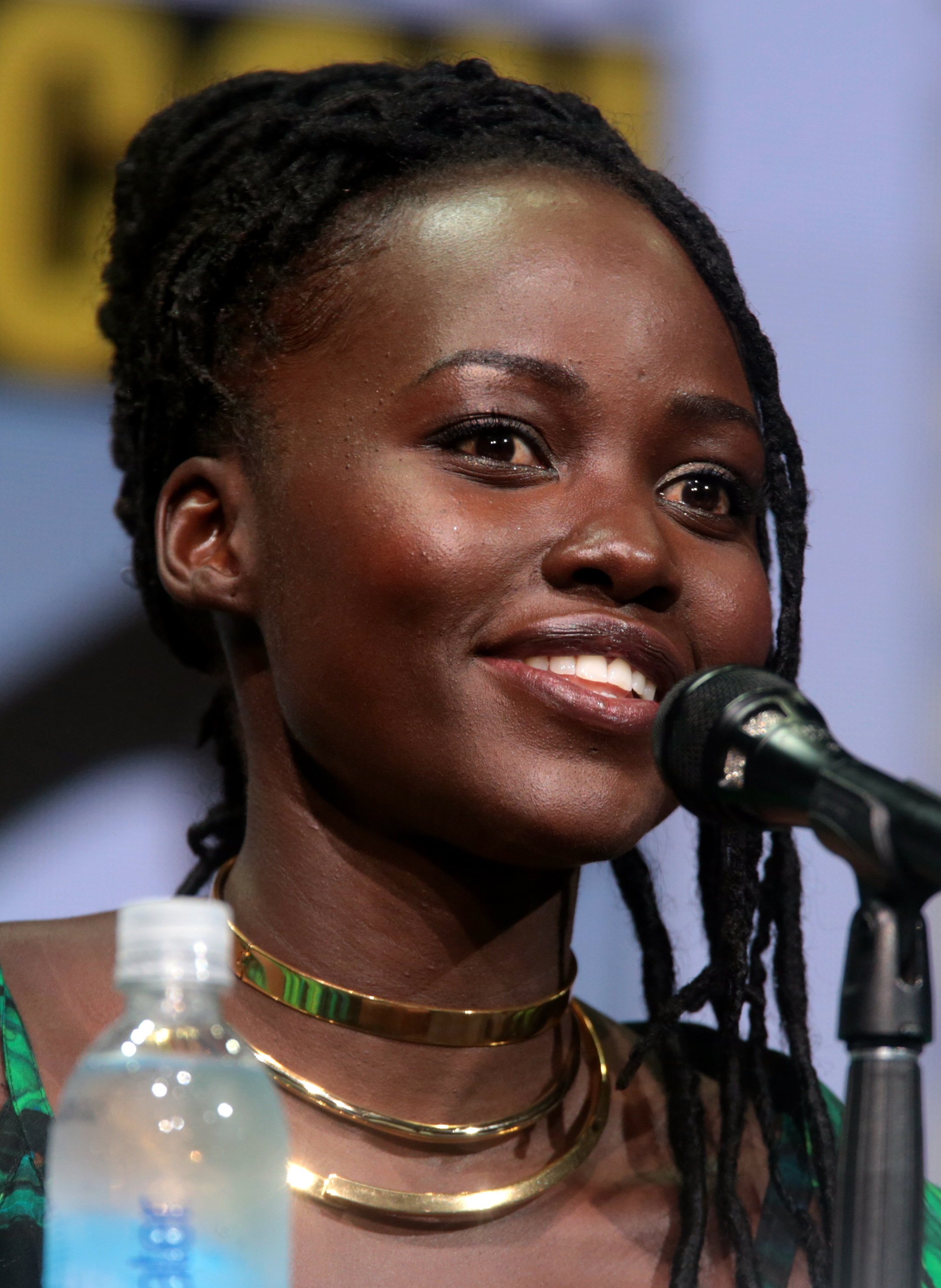
Lupita Nyong'o won for 12 Years a Slave (2013)

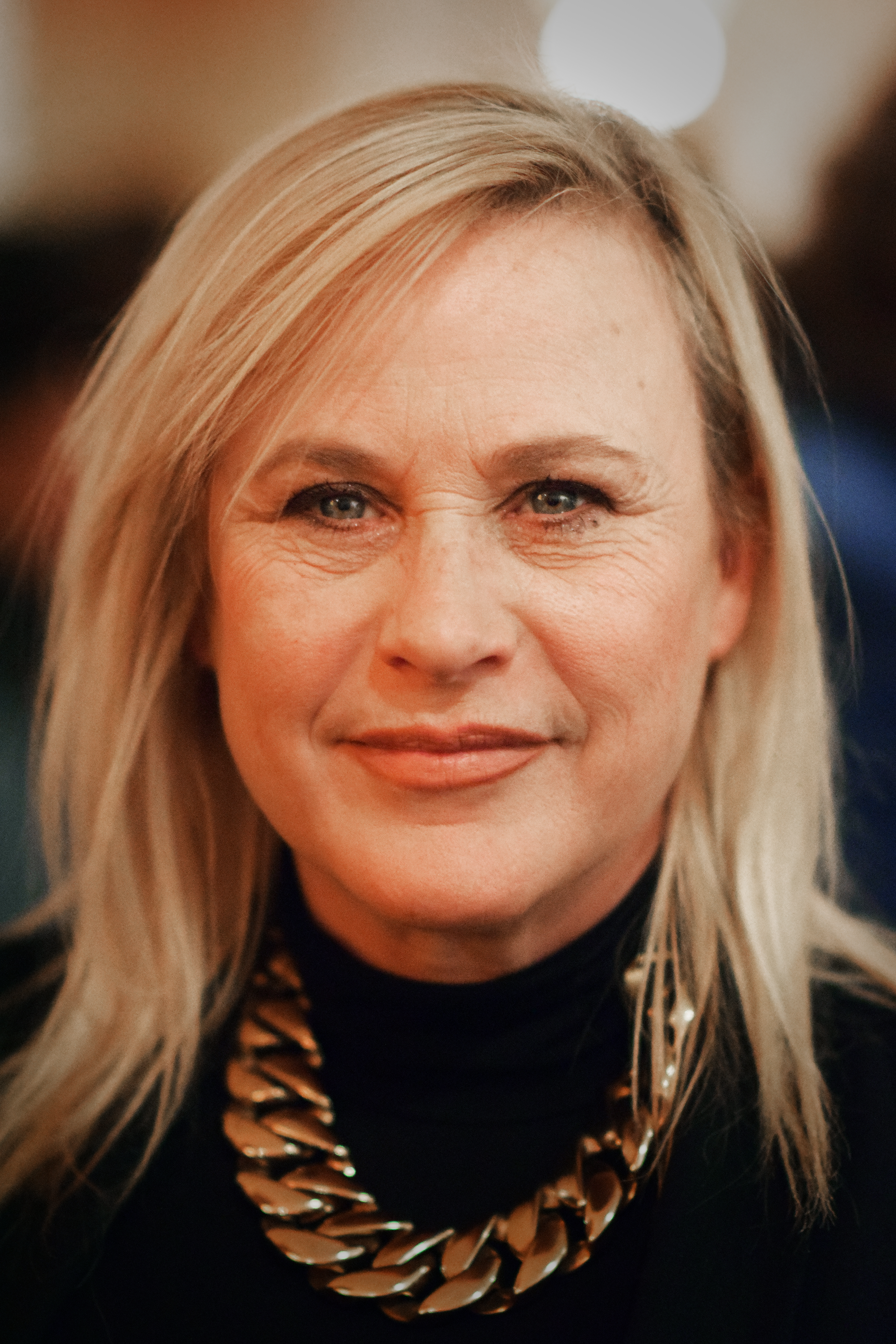
Patricia Arquette won for Boyhood (2014)

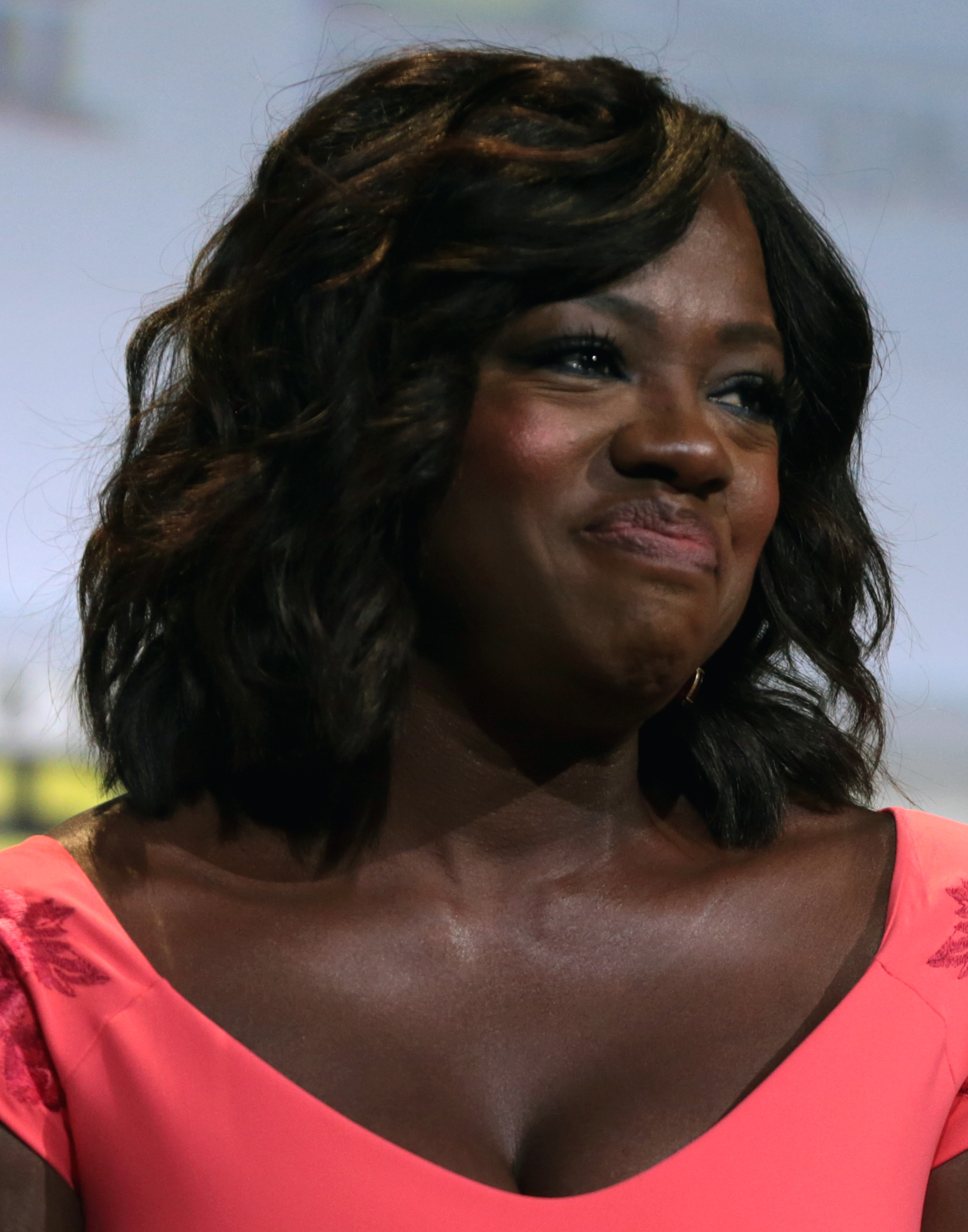
Viola Davis won for Fences (2015)

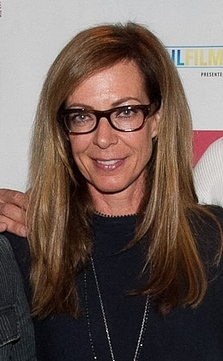
Allison Janney won for I, Tonya (2017)

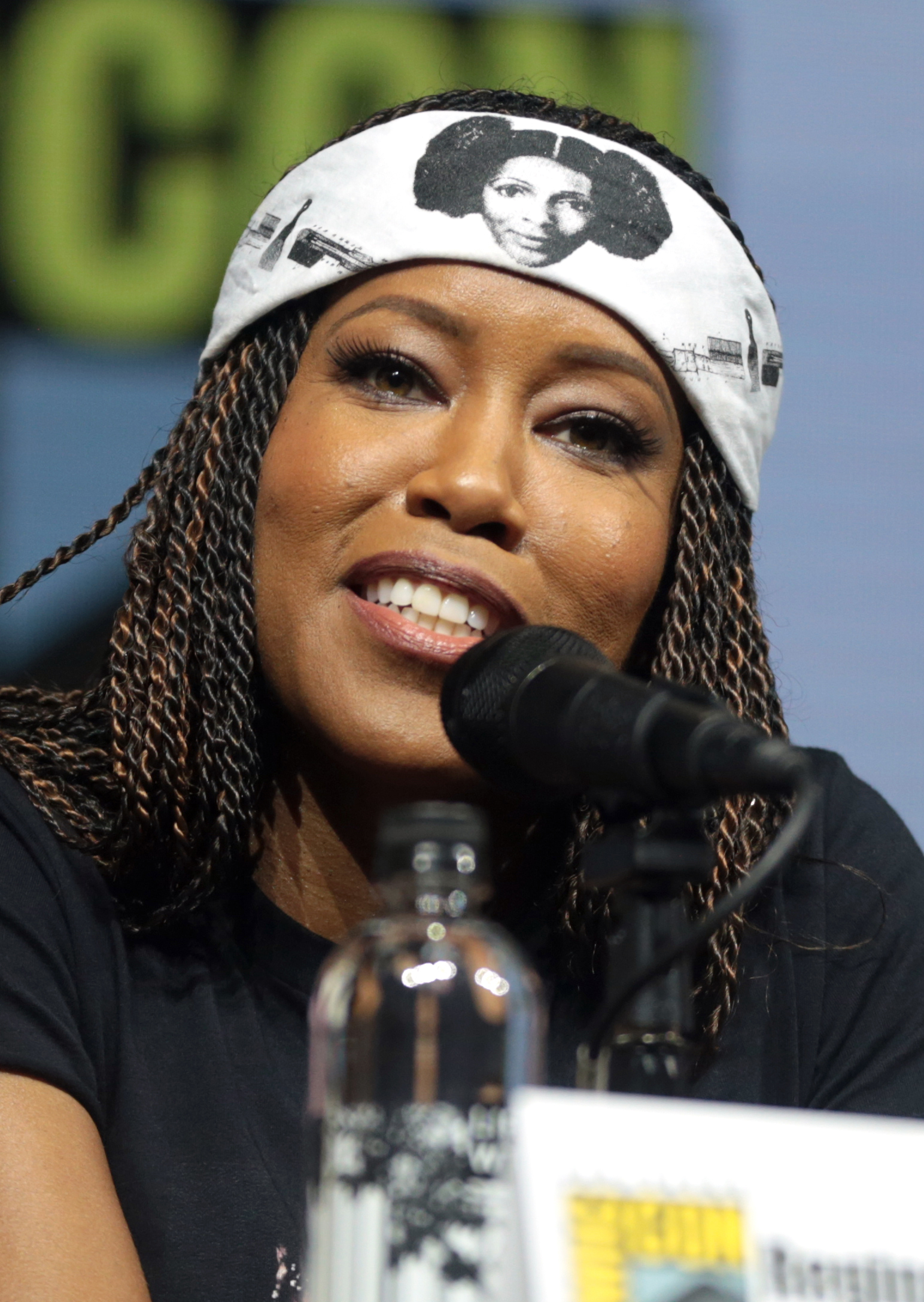
Regina King won for If Beale Street Could Talk (2018)

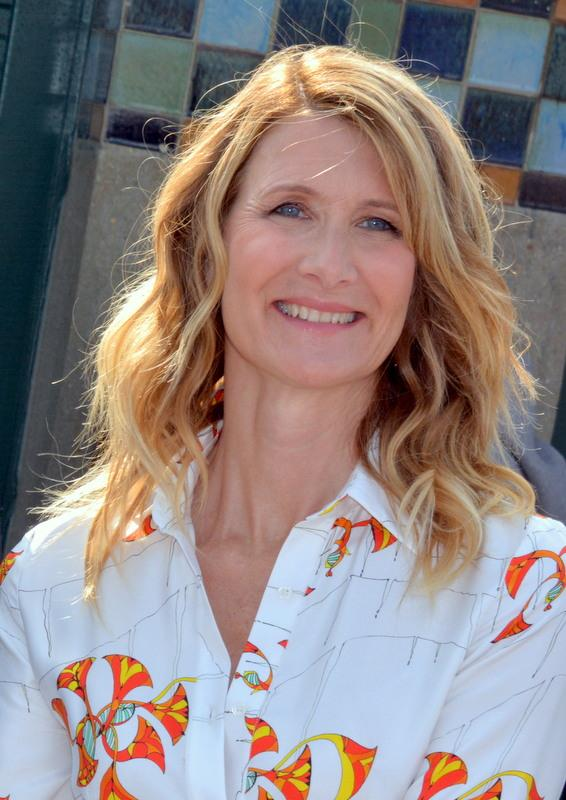
Laura Dern won for Marriage Story (2019)

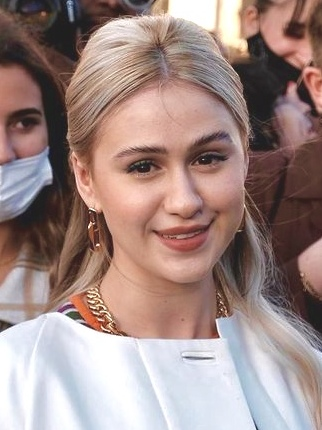
Maria Bakalova won for Borat Subsequent Moviefilm (2020)

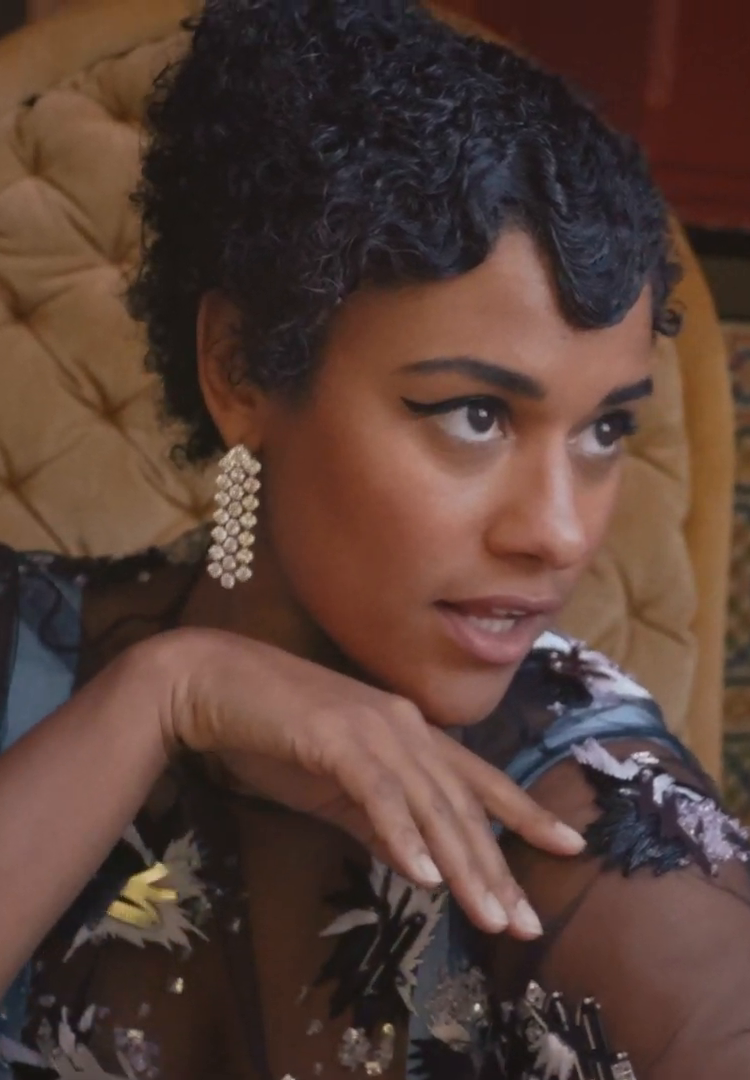
Ariana DeBose won for West Side Story (2021)

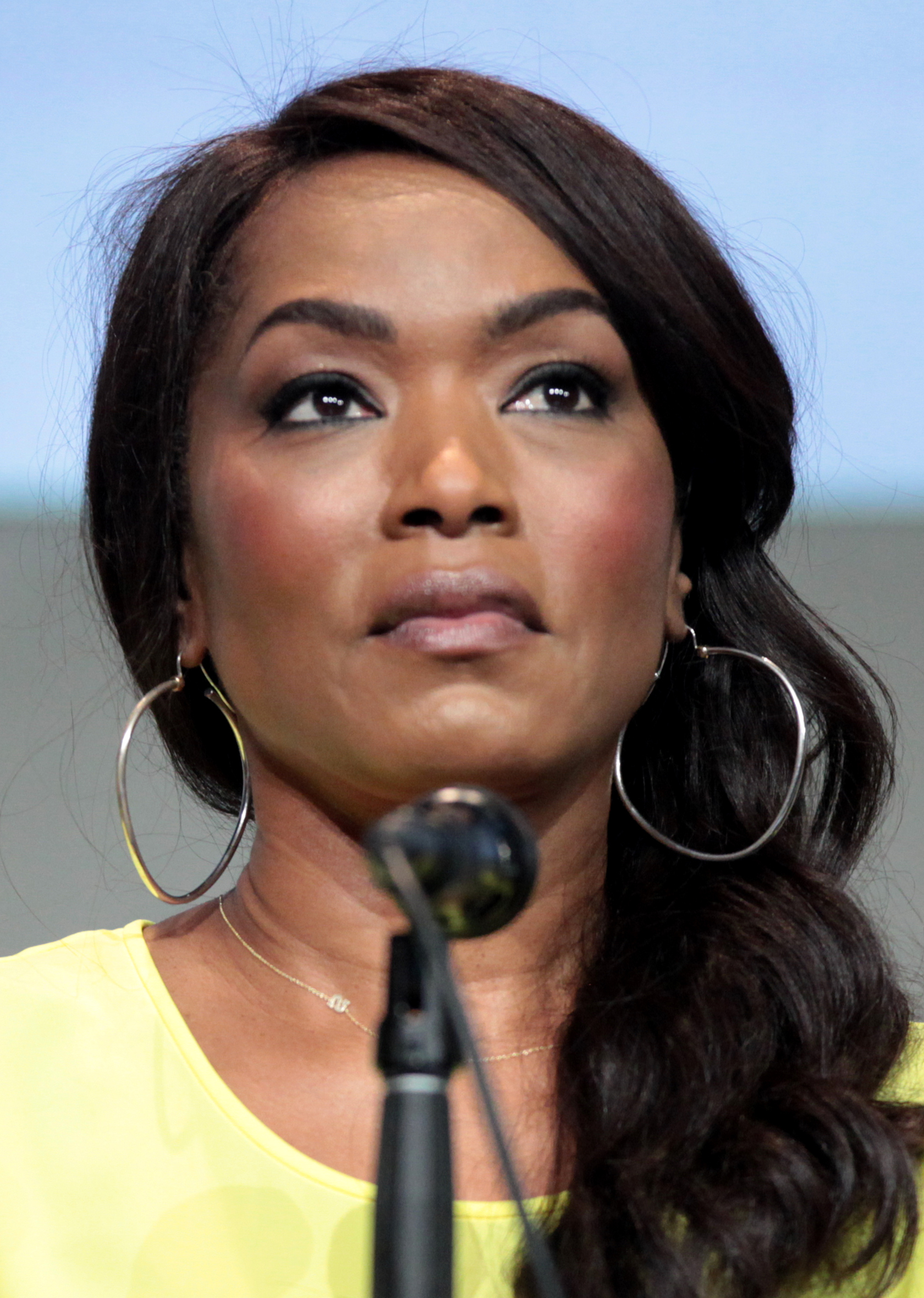
Angela Bassett won for Black Panther: Wakanda Forever (2022)

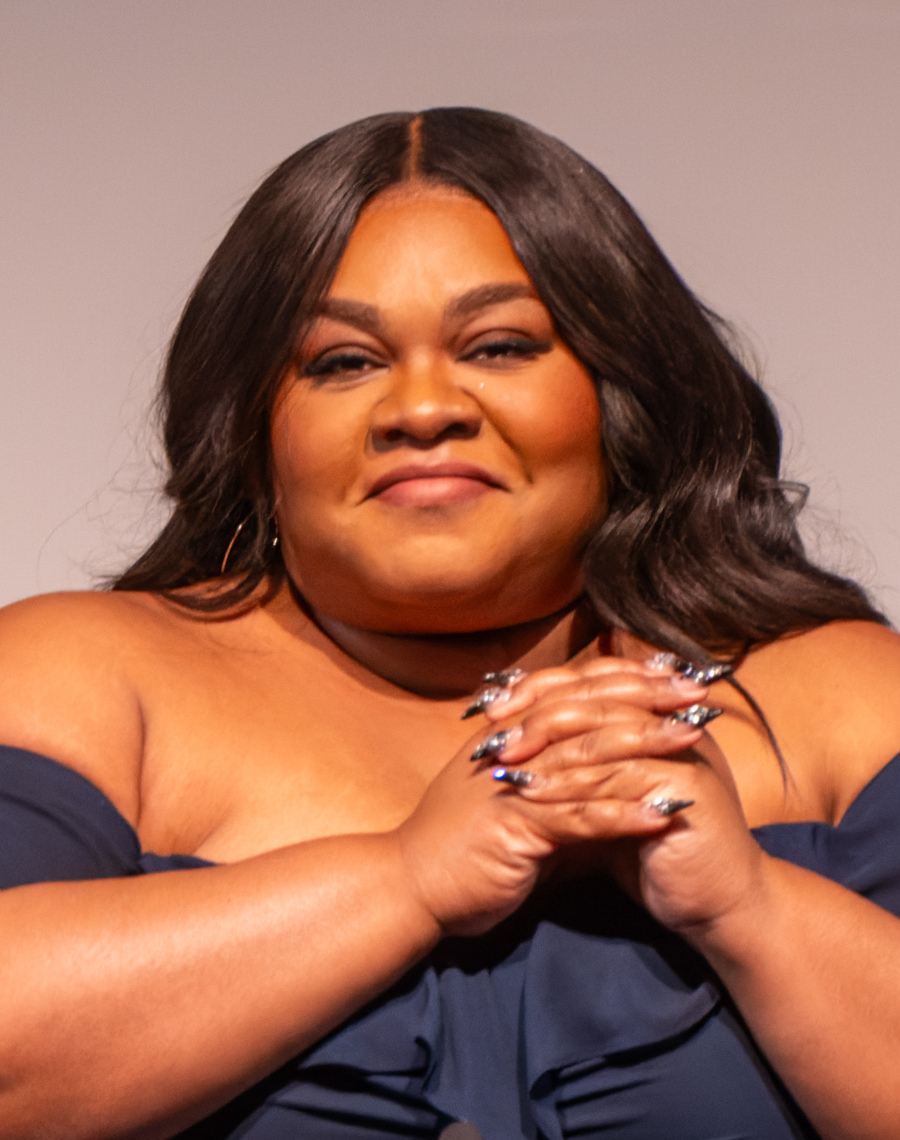
Da'Vine Joy Randolph won for The Holdovers (2023)

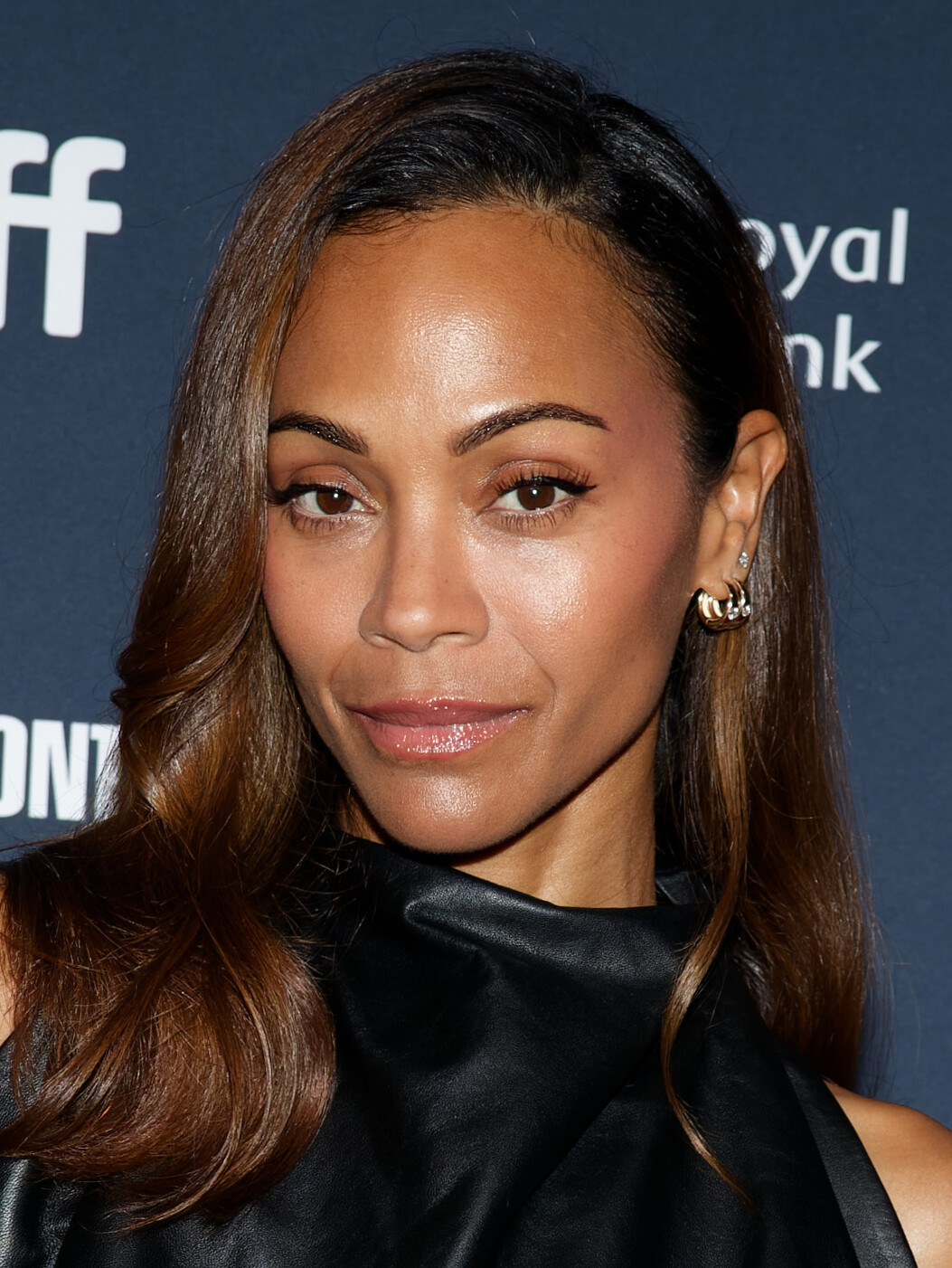
Zoe Saldaña won for Emilia Pérez (2024)

=== 1990s ===
Year	Actor	Character	Film
1995	Mira Sorvino	Linda Ash	Mighty Aphrodite
1996	Joan Allen	Elizabeth Proctor	The Crucible
1997	Joan Cusack	Emily Montgomery	In & Out
1998	Joan Allen (TIE)	Betty Parker	Pleasantville
1998	Kathy Bates (TIE)	Libby Holden	Primary Colors
1999	Angelina Jolie	Lisa Rowe	Girl, Interrupted

=== 2000s ===
Year	Actor	Character	Film
2000	Frances McDormand	Elaine Miller / Sara Gaskell	Almost Famous / Wonder Boys
2001	Jennifer Connelly	Alicia Nash	A Beautiful Mind
2001	Cameron Diaz	Julie Gianni	Vanilla Sky
2001	Marisa Tomei	Natalie Strout	In the Bedroom
2002	Catherine Zeta-Jones	Velma Kelly	Chicago
2002	Kathy Bates	Roberta Hertzel	About Schmidt
2002	Meryl Streep	Susan Orlean	Adaptation.
2003	Renée Zellweger	Ruby Thewes	Cold Mountain
2003	Patricia Clarkson	Joy Burns	Pieces of April
2003	Marcia Gay Harden	Celeste Boyle	Mystic River
2003	Holly Hunter	Melanie Freeland	Thirteen
2003	Scarlett Johansson	Charlotte	Lost in Translation
2004	Virginia Madsen	Maya Randall	Sideways
2004	Cate Blanchett	Katharine Hepburn	The Aviator
2004	Laura Linney	Clara McMillen	Kinsey
2004	Natalie Portman	Alice Ayres / Jane Jones	Closer
2004	Kate Winslet	Sylvia Llewelyn Davies	Finding Neverland
2005	Amy Adams (TIE)	Ashley Johnsten	Junebug
2005	Michelle Williams (TIE)	Alma Beers Del Mar	Brokeback Mountain
2005	Maria Bello	Edie Stall	A History of Violence
2005	Catherine Keener	Nelle Harper Lee	Capote
2005	Frances McDormand	Glory Dodge	North Country
2005	Rachel Weisz	Tessa Abbott-Quayle	The Constant Gardener
2006	Jennifer Hudson	Effie White	Dreamgirls
2006	Adriana Barraza	Amelia Hernandez	Babel
2006	Rinko Kikuchi	Chieko Wataya	Babel
2006	Cate Blanchett	Bathsheba "Sheba" Hart	Notes on a Scandal
2006	Catherine O'Hara	Marilyn Hack	For Your Consideration
2006	Emma Thompson	Karen Eiffel	Stranger than Fiction
2007	Amy Ryan	Helene McCready	Gone Baby Gone
2007	Cate Blanchett	Jude Quinn	I'm Not There
2007	Catherine Keener	Jan Burres	Into the Wild
2007	Vanessa Redgrave	Older Briony	Atonement
2007	Tilda Swinton	Karen Crowder	Michael Clayton
2008	Kate Winslet	Hanna Schmitz	The Reader
2008	Penélope Cruz	María Elena	Vicky Cristina Barcelona
2008	Viola Davis	Mrs. Miller	Doubt
2008	Vera Farmiga	Erica Van Doren	Nothing but the Truth
2008	Taraji P. Henson	Queenie	The Curious Case of Benjamin Button
2008	Marisa Tomei	Cassidy / Pam	The Wrestler
2009	Mo'Nique	Mary Lee Johnston	Precious
2009	Marion Cotillard	Luisa Contini	Nine
2009	Vera Farmiga	Alex Goran	Up in the Air
2009	Anna Kendrick	Natalie Keener	Up in the Air
2009	Julianne Moore	Charlotte "Charley" Roberts	A Single Man
2009	Samantha Morton	Olivia Pitterson	The Messenger

=== 2010s ===
Year	Actor	Character	Film
2010	Melissa Leo	Alice Eklund-Ward	The Fighter
2010	Amy Adams	Charlene Fleming	The Fighter
2010	Helena Bonham Carter	Queen Elizabeth	The King's Speech
2010	Mila Kunis	Lily	Black Swan
2010	Hailee Steinfeld	Mattie Ross	True Grit
2010	Jacki Weaver	Janine "Smurf" Cody	Animal Kingdom
2011	Octavia Spencer	Minny Jackson	The Help
2011	Bérénice Bejo	Peppy Miller	The Artist
2011	Jessica Chastain	Celia Foote	The Help
2011	Melissa McCarthy	Megan Price	Bridesmaids
2011	Carey Mulligan	Sissy Sullivan	Shame
2011	Shailene Woodley	Alexandra "Alex" King	The Descendants
2012	Anne Hathaway	Fantine	Les Misérables
2012	Amy Adams	Peggy Dodd	The Master
2012	Judi Dench	M	Skyfall
2012	Ann Dowd	Sandra	Compliance
2012	Sally Field	Mary Todd Lincoln	Lincoln
2012	Helen Hunt	Cheryl Cohen-Greene	The Sessions
2013	Lupita Nyong'o	Patsey	12 Years a Slave
2013	Scarlett Johansson	Samantha (voice)	Her
2013	Jennifer Lawrence	Rosalyn Rosenfeld	American Hustle
2013	Julia Roberts	Barbara Weston-Fordham	August: Osage County
2013	June Squibb	Kate Grant	Nebraska
2013	Oprah Winfrey	Gloria Gaines	The Butler
2014	Patricia Arquette	Olivia Evans	Boyhood
2014	Jessica Chastain	Anna Morales	A Most Violent Year
2014	Keira Knightley	Joan Clarke	The Imitation Game
2014	Emma Stone	Sam Thomson	Birdman
2014	Meryl Streep	The Witch	Into the Woods
2014	Tilda Swinton	Minister Mason	Snowpiercer
2015	Alicia Vikander	Gerda Wegener	The Danish Girl
2015	Jennifer Jason Leigh	Daisy Domergue	The Hateful Eight
2015	Rooney Mara	Therese Belivet	Carol
2015	Rachel McAdams	Sacha Pfeiffer	Spotlight
2015	Helen Mirren	Hedda Hopper	Trumbo
2015	Kate Winslet	Joanna Hoffman	Steve Jobs
2016	Viola Davis	Rose Maxson	Fences
2016	Greta Gerwig	Abigail "Abbie" Porter	20th Century Women
2016	Naomie Harris	Paula	Moonlight
2016	Nicole Kidman	Sue Brierley	Lion
2016	Janelle Monáe	Mary Jackson	Hidden Figures
2016	Michelle Williams	Randi Chandler	Manchester by the Sea
2017	Allison Janney	LaVona Golden	I, Tonya
2017	Mary J. Blige	Florence Jackson	Mudbound
2017	Hong Chau	Ngoc Lan Tran	Downsizing
2017	Tiffany Haddish	Dina	Girls Trip
2017	Holly Hunter	Beth Gardner	The Big Sick
2017	Laurie Metcalf	Marion McPherson	Lady Bird
2017	Octavia Spencer	Zelda Delilah Fuller	The Shape of Water
2018	Regina King	Sharon Rivers	If Beale Street Could Talk
2018	Amy Adams	Lynne Cheney	Vice
2018	Claire Foy	Janet Armstrong	First Man
2018	Nicole Kidman	Nancy Eamons	Boy Erased
2018	Emma Stone	Abigail Masham	The Favourite
2018	Rachel Weisz	Sarah Churchill	The Favourite
2019	Laura Dern	Nora Fanshaw	Marriage Story
2019	Scarlett Johansson	Rosie Betzler	Jojo Rabbit
2019	Jennifer Lopez	Ramona Vega	Hustlers
2019	Florence Pugh	Amy March	Little Women
2019	Margot Robbie	Kayla Pospisil	Bombshell
2019	Zhao Shu-zhen	Nai Nai	The Farewell

=== 2020s ===
Year	Actor	Character	Film
2020	Maria Bakalova	Tutar Sagdiyev	Borat Subsequent Moviefilm
2020	Ellen Burstyn	Elizabeth Weiss	Pieces of a Woman
2020	Glenn Close	Bonnie "Mamaw" Vance	Hillbilly Elegy
2020	Amanda Seyfried	Marion Davies	Mank
2020	Olivia Colman	Anne	The Father
2020	Youn Yuh-jung	Soon-ja	Minari
2021	Ariana DeBose	Anita	West Side Story
2021	Caitríona Balfe	Ma	Belfast
2021	Kirsten Dunst	Rose Gordon	The Power of the Dog
2021	Ann Dowd	Linda	Mass
2021	Aunjanue Ellis-Taylor	Oracene "Brandy" Price	King Richard
2021	Rita Moreno	Valentina	West Side Story
2022	Angela Bassett	Queen Ramonda	Black Panther: Wakanda Forever
2022	Jessie Buckley	Mariche	Women Talking
2022	Kerry Condon	Siobhán Súilleabháin	The Banshees of Inisherin
2022	Jamie Lee Curtis	Deirdre Beaubeirdre	Everything Everywhere All at Once
2022	Stephanie Hsu	Joy Wang / Jobu Tupaki	Everything Everywhere All at Once
2022	Janelle Monáe	Cassandra "Andi" Brand / Helen Brand	Glass Onion: A Knives Out Mystery
2023	Da'Vine Joy Randolph	Mary Lamb	The Holdovers
2023	Emily Blunt	Katherine "Kitty" Oppenheimer	Oppenheimer
2023	Danielle Brooks	Sofia Johnson	The Color Purple
2023	America Ferrera	Gloria	Barbie
2023	Jodie Foster	Bonnie Stoll	Nyad
2023	Julianne Moore	Gracie Atherton-Yoo	May December
2024	Zoë Saldaña	Rita Mora Castro	Emilia Pérez
2024	Danielle Deadwyler	Berniece Charles	The Piano Lesson
2024	Aunjanue Ellis-Taylor	Hattie	Nickel Boys
2024	Ariana Grande	Galinda "Glinda" Upland	Wicked
2024	Margaret Qualley	Sue	The Substance
2024	Isabella Rossellini	Sister Agnes	Conclave
2025	Amy Madigan	Gladys	Weapons
2025	Elle Fanning	Rachel Kemp	Sentimental Value
2025	Ariana Grande	Galinda "Glinda" Upland	Wicked: For Good
2025	Inga Ibsdotter Lilleaas	Agnes Borg Petterson	Sentimental Value
2025	Wunmi Mosaku	Annie	Sinners
2025	Teyana Taylor	Perfidia Beverly Hills	One Battle After Another

== Multiple nominees ==
2 nominations

- Joan Allen
- Kathy Bates
- Jessica Chastain
- Viola Davis
- Ann Dowd
- Aunjanue Ellis-Taylor
- Vera Farmiga
- Ariana Grande
- Holly Hunter
- Catherine Keener
- Nicole Kidman
- Frances McDormand
- Janelle Monáe
- Julianne Moore
- Octavia Spencer
- Emma Stone
- Meryl Streep
- Tilda Swinton
- Marisa Tomei
- Rachel Weisz
- Michelle Williams

3 nominations

- Cate Blanchett
- Scarlett Johansson
- Kate Winslet

4 nominations

- Amy Adams

== Multiple winners ==
2 wins

- Joan Allen

== See also ==
- Academy Award for Best Supporting Actress
- BAFTA Award for Best Actress in a Supporting Role
- Independent Spirit Award for Best Supporting Female
- Golden Globe Award for Best Supporting Actress – Motion Picture
- Screen Actors Guild Award for Outstanding Performance by a Female Actor in a Supporting Role
