= Joan Allen =

American actress (born 1956)

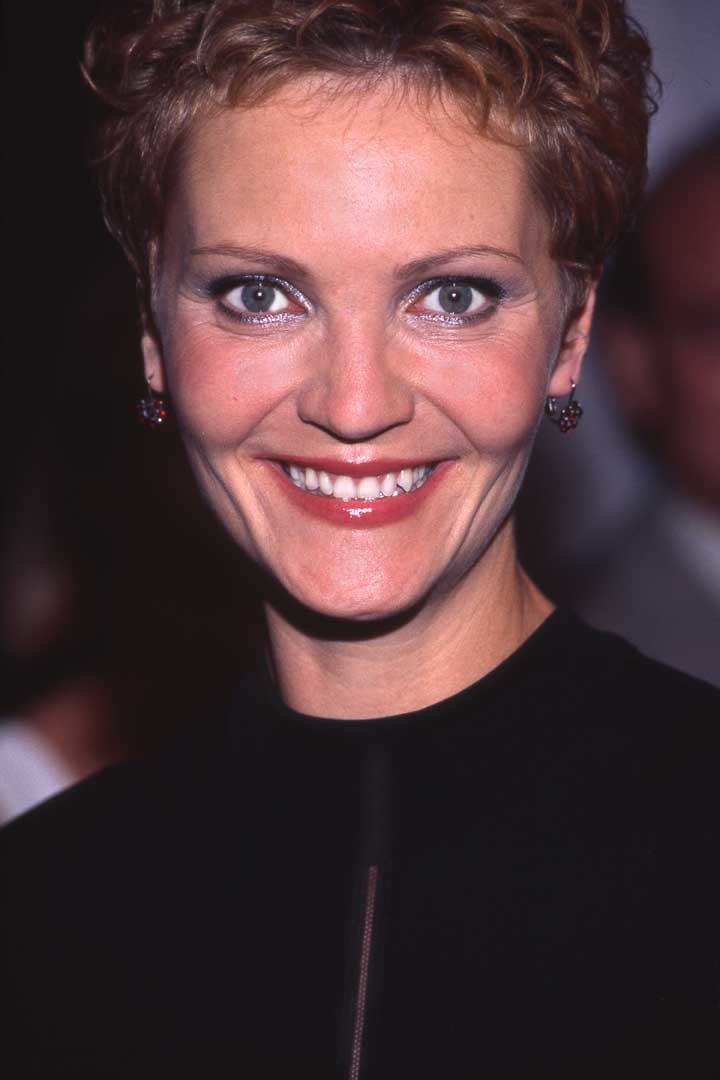
- Allen in 2000
- Born: August 20, 1956 (age 70); Rochelle, Illinois, U.S.
- Education: Eastern Illinois University; Northern Illinois University
- Occupation: Actress
- Years active: 1977–present
- Spouse: Peter Friedman (m. 1990; div. 2002)
- Children: 1
- Awards: Full list

Joan Allen (born August 20, 1956) is an American actress. Known for her work on stage and screen, she has received various accolades, including a Tony Award, in addition to nominations for three Academy Awards, a BAFTA Award, three Primetime Emmy Awards, and three Golden Globe Awards.

She began her career with the Steppenwolf Theatre Company in 1977, won the 1984 Drama Desk Award for Outstanding Actress in a Play for And a Nightingale Sang, and won the 1988 Tony Award for Best Actress in a Play for her Broadway debut in Burn This. In the mid-1990s to the early 2000s, Allen received international recognition for a string of critically acclaimed performances. She is also a three-time Academy Award nominee, receiving Best Supporting Actress nominations for Nixon (1995) and The Crucible (1996), and a Best Actress nomination for The Contender (2000).

Allen's other film roles include Manhunter (1986), Peggy Sue Got Married (1986), Tucker: The Man and His Dream (1988), Searching for Bobby Fischer (1993), The Ice Storm (1997), Face/Off (1997), Pleasantville (1998), The Bourne Supremacy (2004), The Upside of Anger (2005), The Bourne Ultimatum (2007), Death Race (2008), and The Bourne Legacy (2012). She won the Canadian Screen Award for Best Supporting Actress for the 2015 film Room. She has also starred in the Broadway plays The Heidi Chronicles (1988), Impressionism (2009), and The Waverly Gallery (2018).

== Early life ==
Allen was born on August 20, 1956 in Rochelle, Illinois. Allen is the daughter of Dorothea Marie (née Wirth), a homemaker, and James Jefferson Allen, a gas station owner. She has an older brother, David, and two older sisters, Mary and Lynn. While in high school, she tried out for and won a part in a school play. After graduation, she attended Eastern Illinois University, where she met the actor John Malkovich, and then transferred to Northern Illinois University, which she attended from 1975 to 1977.

== Career ==
=== 1977–1994: Early work and Broadway roles ===
Allen began her performing career as a stage actress and on television before making her film debut in the movie Compromising Positions (1985). She became a member of the Steppenwolf Theatre Company ensemble in 1977 when John Malkovich asked her to join. Allen's work with Steppenwolf has included productions of Three Sisters, Waiting For The Parade, Love Letters, The Marriage of Bette and Boo, and The Wheel. In 1989, Allen won a Tony Award for her Broadway debut performance in Burn This opposite Malkovich. She also starred in the Pulitzer Prize-winning play The Heidi Chronicles, with Boyd Gaines at the Plymouth Theatre. The show was met with critical praise, receiving six Tony Award nominations and winning Best Play. Allen received her second Tony Award nomination for her performance.

=== 1995–2003: Established actress ===
In 1995, Allen portrayed First Lady Pat Nixon acting opposite Anthony Hopkins playing the title role in the Oliver Stone biographical drama Nixon. Critic Roger Ebert praised Allen's performance, writing, "The key supporting performance in the movie is by Joan Allen as Pat Nixon. She emerges as strong-willed and clear-eyed, a truth-teller who sees through Nixon's masks and evasions." She received a nomination for the Academy Award for Best Supporting Actress. That same year, she acted in the teen romantic drama Mad Love (1995).

The following year, Allen played Elizabeth Proctor, a woman accused of witchcraft, in The Crucible (1996). Allen acted opposite Daniel Day-Lewis in the Nicholas Hytner directed film based on the Arthur Miller 1953 play of the same name. Owen Gleiberman of Entertainment Weekly hailed Allen's performance, writing, "It's Joan Allen who carries the weight of the film's sorrow, eyes glistening with woe as she delivers the heartbreaking confession to her husband". She received the Critics' Choice Movie Award for Best Supporting Actress as well as a nomination for the Academy Award for Best Supporting Actress. The following year she starred in the drama The Ice Storm directed by Ang Lee, playing an unsatisfied woman who discovers her husband is having an affair with a neighbor. Allen acted opposite Kevin Kline, Sigourney Weaver, Elijah Wood, Christina Ricci, and Tobey Maguire. The Hollywood Reporter named it her best film performance, writing, "Allen is exquisitely contained, embodying the awkward grace and indefinable ache." She also had a supporting role in the science fiction action film Face/Off (1997).

In 1998, Allen starred in the Gary Ross-directed fantasy comedy-drama Pleasantville. Allen acted alongside Jeff Daniels, Reese Witherspoon, and Tobey Maguire. For her performance she won the Critics' Choice Movie Award for Best Supporting Actress. The film was compared favorably to The Truman Show also released in 1998. Joe Leydon of Variety wrote, "Allen is equally effective in her subtle transformation from docile Stepford Wife to yearning free spirit". She also acted in It's the Rage (1999) based on the Keith Reddin play of the same name, and When the Sky Falls (2000). Both film received negative reviews with some praise for Allen's performance.

She was also nominated for Best Actress, the Golden Globe Award for Best Actress in a Motion Picture – Drama, and the Screen Actors Guild Award for Outstanding Performance by a Female Actor in a Leading Role for her role in the political drama The Contender (2000). In the film she portrayed a politician who becomes the object of scandal. She starred opposite Jeff Bridges and Gary Oldman. In 2001, Allen starred in the mini-series The Mists of Avalon on TNT and earned a Primetime Emmy Award for Outstanding Supporting Actress in a Limited or Anthology Series or Movie nomination for the role. In 2003 she starred in Off the Map which premiered at the 2003 Sundance Film Festival.

=== Since 2004: Return to Broadway ===
Allen starred as Rachel McAdams' mother in the 2004 movie The Notebook. In 2005, she received many positive notices for her leading role in the comedy/drama The Upside of Anger, in which she played an alcoholic housewife. Kirk Honeycutt of The Hollywood Reporter writing, "Allen turns the character into a tour de force that unleashes an unexpected comedy about compassion and self-loathing." She received a Critics' Choice Movie Award for Best Actress nomination for her performance. She played CIA Deputy Director Pamela Landy in The Bourne Supremacy (2004), The Bourne Ultimatum (2007) and The Bourne Legacy (2012). Allen appeared in Death Race (2008), playing a prison warden.

In 2009, Allen starred as Georgia O'Keeffe in Lifetime Television's 2009 biopic chronicling the artist's life. Allen returned to Broadway after a twenty-year absence in March 2009, when she played the role of Katherine Keenan in Michael Jacobs' play Impressionism opposite Jeremy Irons at the Gerald Schoenfeld Theatre. The play was met with mixed reviews from critics. The New Yorker wrote the play "is as awkward as it is sublime", noting its "brazen sweetness" and "openhearted humor". Allen voiced the character Delphine in Bethesda Softworks' 2011 video game The Elder Scrolls V: Skyrim. She also voiced Deborah in the Thomas Nelson audio Bible production known as The Word of Promise. The project also featured a large ensemble of well known Hollywood actors including Jim Caviezel, Lou Gossett Jr., John Rhys-Davies, Jon Voight, Gary Sinise, Christopher McDonald, Marisa Tomei and John Schneider. In 2015, Allen signed for the leading role in the ABC drama series The Family, playing the role of villainous and manipulative mayor and matriarch of her family.

After a nine-year absence from Broadway, Allen played Ellen Fine in the critically acclaimed Broadway premiere production of the Kenneth Lonergan play The Waverly Gallery in 2018, alongside Elaine May, Lucas Hedges, and Michael Cera at the John Golden Theatre. David Rooney of The Hollywood Reporter praised Allen's performance writing, "Allen in a standout performance of tremendous raw feeling and sorrow". After a five-year break from acting in movies and television, she co-starred with Julianne Moore, Clive Owen, and Jennifer Jason Leigh in Lisey's Story, the 2021 Apple TV miniseries adapted by Stephen King from his own novel. It was Allen's second King adaptation after playing the lead role in the 2014 movie, A Good Marriage. She then appeared alongside Robert De Niro and Lizzy Caplan in Netflix's conspiracy thriller limited series Zero Day.

== Personal life ==
In 1990, Allen married actor Peter Friedman. They had one daughter, born in February 1994. They divorced in 2002.

== Filmography ==
=== Film ===
Year	Title	Role	Notes
1985	Compromising Positions	Mary Alice Mahoney	
1986	Manhunter	Reba McClane	
1986	Zeisters	Lala	
1986	Peggy Sue Got Married	Maddy Nagle	
1988	Tucker: The Man and His Dream	Vera Tucker	
1989	In Country	Irene	
1993	Ethan Frome	Zeena Frome	
1993	Searching for Bobby Fischer	Bonnie Waitzkin	
1993	Josh and S.A.M.	Caroline Whitney	
1995	Mad Love	Margaret Roberts	
1995	Nixon	Pat Nixon	
1996	The Crucible	Elizabeth Proctor	
1997	The Ice Storm	Elena Hood	
1997	Face/Off	Dr. Eve Archer	
1998	Pleasantville	Betty Parker	
1999	All The Rage	Helen	
2000	When the Sky Falls	Sinead Hamilton	
2000	The Contender	Senator Laine Billings Hanson	
2003	Off the Map	Arlene Groden	
2004	The Notebook	Ann Hamilton	
2004	The Bourne Supremacy	CIA Dep. Dir. Pamela Landy	
2004	Yes	She	
2005	The Upside of Anger	Terry Ann Wolfmeyer	
2006	Bonneville	Carol	
2007	The Bourne Ultimatum	CIA Dep. Dir. Pamela Landy	
2008	Death Race	Claire Hennessey	
2009	Hachi: A Dog's Tale	Kate Wilson	
2012	The Bourne Legacy	CIA Dep. Dir. Pamela Landy	Cameo
2014	A Good Marriage	Darcy Anderson	
2015	Room	Nancy Newsome	

=== Television ===
Year	Title	Role	Notes
1983	Say Goodnight, Gracie	Ginny	Television movie
1985	Evergreen	Iris Friedman	Miniseries; 2 episodes
1987	All My Sons	Ann Deever	Television movie
1987	The Room Upstairs	Ellie	Television movie
1987	The Twilight Zone	Sally Dobbs	Episode: "Joy Ride/Shelter Skelter/Private Channel"
1991	Without Warning: The James Brady Story	Sarah Brady	Television movie
1996	Frasier	Lydia (voice)	Episode: "High Crane Drifter"
1998	Saturday Night Live	Herself (host)	Episode: "Joan Allen/Jewel"
2001	The Mists of Avalon	Morgause	Miniseries; 2 episodes
2009	Georgia O'Keeffe	Georgia O'Keeffe	Television movie
2012	Luck	Claire Lachay	6 episodes
2014	The Killing	Colonel Margaret Rayne	6 episodes; credited as special guest star
2016	The Family	Claire Warren	12 episodes
2021	Lisey's Story	Amanda Debusher	Miniseries; 8 episodes
2025	Zero Day	Sheila Mullen	Miniseries; 6 episodes

=== Theatre ===
Year	Title	Role	Playwright	Venue
1987	Burn This	Anna Mann	Lanford Wilson	Plymouth Theatre, Broadway
1989	The Heidi Chronicles	Heidi Holland	Wendy Wasserstein	Plymouth Theatre, Broadway
2009	Impressionism	Katharine Keenan	Michael Jacobs	Gerald Schoenfeld Theatre, Broadway
2018	The Waverly Gallery	Ellen Fine	Kenneth Lonergan	John Golden Theatre, Broadway

=== Audio ===
Year	Title	Role	Notes
2008	The Almost Moon		Audio book; By Alice Sebold
2009	The Word of Promise Audio Bible	Deborah (voice)	Audio play

=== Video games ===
Year	Title	Role	Notes
2011	The Elder Scrolls V: Skyrim	Delphine (voice)	
