= The Heidi Chronicles =

1988 play by Wendy Wasserstein

- Original language: English
- Written by: Wendy Wasserstein
- Characters: Heidi Holland; Peter Patrone; Scoop Rosenbaum; Susan Johnston; Lisa; Jill; Fran
- Genre: Drama
- Setting: New York, Chicago, Manchester, New Hampshire, Ann Arbor, 1965–1989

Premiere
- Date: November 18, 1988
- Place: Playwrights Horizons; New York City, New York

The Heidi Chronicles is a 1988 play by Wendy Wasserstein. The play won the 1989 Pulitzer Prize for Drama.

== Production history ==
A workshop production at Seattle Repertory Theatre was held in April 1988, directed by Daniel J. Sullivan, starring Lizbeth MacKay, Caroline Aaron, and Gretchen Corbett.

The play premiered Off-Broadway at Playwrights Horizons on November 18, 1988 and closed on February 19, 1989 after 99 performances. It then transferred to Broadway at the Plymouth Theatre, opening on March 9, 1989 and closing on September 1, 1990, after 622 performances. Both productions were directed by Sullivan. The set design was by Thomas Lynch, costume design by Jennifer von Mayrhauser and lighting design by Pat Collins. The cast starred Joan Allen as Heidi, Boyd Gaines as Peter, and Peter Friedman as Scoop. Sarah Jessica Parker was featured in three small roles off-Broadway; those roles were played by Cynthia Nixon for the Broadway run.

Replacement actors on Broadway included Christine Lahti, Brooke Adams, and Mary McDonnell as Heidi, David Hyde Pierce as Peter, and Tony Shalhoub as Scoop.

Two Broadway Heidis married the actor who played opposite them as Scoop: Joan Allen and Peter Friedman (now divorced) and Brooke Adams and Tony Shalhoub.

The first major production mounted after Wasserstein's death in January 2006 was at the Berkshire Theatre Festival in August and September 2006, featuring Kate Jennings Grant.

On September 30, 2011, produced by The English Theatre of Rome and directed by Gaby Ford, the play premiered in Italy, at Rome's Teatro dell'Arciliuto near Piazza Navona, to wide acclaim.

A revival began Broadway previews on February 23, 2015, at the Music Box Theatre. The cast featured Elisabeth Moss in the title role, Bryce Pinkham as Peter Patrone and Jason Biggs as Scoop Rosenbaum, directed by Pam MacKinnon. The play opened officially on March 19. The production was originally scheduled to play through August 9, 2015 but closed on May 3 due to low ticket sales.

== Synopsis ==
The plot follows Heidi Holland from high school in the 1960s to her career as a successful art historian more than twenty years later.

The play's main themes deal with the changing role of women during this time period, describing both Heidi's ardent feminism during the 1970s and her eventual sense of betrayal during the 1980s.

Though most of the characters are women, there are two important male characters; Peter Patrone, a gay pediatrician who is arguably Heidi's best friend, and Scoop Rosenbaum, a magazine editor who marries and has many affairs, and with whom Heidi has a tense friendship. Heidi meets Scoop at a Eugene McCarthy rally where he tries to woo her with knowledge and wit. She seems unenthused, but she realizes Scoop is a very intelligent, attractive man despite his egotistical ways. Although their romantic relationship is unsuccessful, the chemistry between Scoop and Heidi is undeniable, and they become lifelong friends.

Heidi realizes that remaining unmarried does not mean she cannot be a mother, and she chooses to adopt a child on her own.

== Critical responses and cultural impact ==
The New York Times critic Mel Gussow wrote of the Playwrights Horizon production: "Ms. Wasserstein has always been a clever writer of comedy. This time she has been exceedingly watchful about not settling for easy laughter, and the result is a more penetrating play. This is not to suggest, however, that The Heidi Chronicles is ever lacking in humor."

== Film adaptation ==
In 1995, the play was adapted as a television film. It was directed by Paul Bogart and starred Jamie Lee Curtis and Tom Hulce in the leading roles.

== Awards and nominations ==
=== Original Broadway production (1989) ===
Year	Award ceremony	Category	Nominee	Result
1989	Pulitzer Prize for Drama			Won
1989	Tony Award	Best Play		Won
1989	Tony Award	Best Actress in a Play	Joan Allen	Nominated
1989	Tony Award	Best Featured Actor in a Play	Boyd Gaines	Won
1989	Tony Award	Best Featured Actress in a Play	Joanne Camp	Nominated
1989	Tony Award	Best Scenic Design of a Play	Thomas Lynch	Nominated
1989	Tony Award	Best Direction of a Play	Daniel J. Sullivan	Nominated
1989	Drama Desk Award	Outstanding New Play		Won
1989	Drama Desk Award	Outstanding Actor in a Play	Peter Friedman	Won
1989	Drama Desk Award	Outstanding Actress in a Play	Joan Allen	Nominated
1989	Drama Desk Award	Outstanding Featured Actress in a Play	Joanne Camp	Nominated
1989	Drama Desk Award	Outstanding Director of a Play	Daniel J. Sullivan	Nominated
1989	Drama Desk Award	Outstanding Set Design	Thomas Lynch	Nominated
1989	New York Drama Critics' Circle	Best Play		Won

=== Broadway revival (2015) ===
Year	Award ceremony	Category	Nominee	Result
2015	Tony Award	Best Actress in a Play	Elisabeth Moss	Nominated
