= Harry Keyishian =

American editor and academic (1932–2026)

- Born: April 9, 1932 New York City, U.S.
- Died: April 4, 2026 (aged 93) Morristown, New Jersey, U.S.
- Occupation: Editor; academic
- Education: Queens College, City University of New York (B.A.); New York University (PhD)
- Spouse: Marjorie Ann Deiter (m. 1965; died 2022)
- Children: 4

Harry Keyishian (April 9, 1932 – April 4, 2026) was an American editor and academic. He was a professor of English at Fairleigh Dickinson University and served on the editorial board of Fairleigh Dickinson University Press. He directed Fairleigh Dickinson University Press from 1977 to 2017 and worked extensively on William Shakespeare and Armenian literature. As a teacher at the State University of New York (University at Buffalo), his refusal to sign an oath that he was not a member of the Communist Party led him to be the lead plaintiff in the Supreme Court case Keyishian v. Board of Regents (385 U.S. 589 (1967)) that ruled states cannot prohibit employees from being members of the Communist Party.

== Life and career ==
Keyishian was born in The Bronx, New York, on April 9, 1932, to Armenian immigrants. He was raised in Queens, attending local public schools and Forest Hills High School. He attended Queens College from 1950 to 1954, receiving a bachelor’s degree in English literature, and then entered graduate school at New York University. As an undergraduate student at Queens College, City University of New York in 1952, Keyishian became part of a committee that protested the firing of Professor Vera Shlakman for refusing to testify if she had ever been a member of the Communist Party. A member of the US Naval Reserve, Keyishian served on active duty from September 1956 to July 1958 at the US Naval Air Station in Argentia, Newfoundland, in the Information and Education Office and, for the last seven months, as Station Manager of VOUS-Argentia (Voice of America). While on active duty, he received his MA in English from NYU and taught courses in English for the University of Maryland Overseas Program. After his discharge from the service, he taught part-time at NYU and City College of New York and, in the spring of 1961, taught full-time at the Bronx Community College. In September 1961, Keyishian joined the English Department at the University of Buffalo (renamed University at Buffalo, SUNY in 1962), from which he was terminated in February 1964 for refusing to sign a then-required loyalty oath that he was not a member of the Communist Party.

He and four colleagues challenged the Feinberg Law of New York State, which, their suit alleged, too broadly defined subversive activities and which improperly limited political association. Buffalo attorney Richard Lipsitz (1920–2018) argued the case for the plaintiffs. The Feinberg Law was upheld by a three-judge panel in New York in 1966, but overturned by the Supreme Court of the United States in 1967. Declaring that the terms of the Feinberg Law were too vague and intrusive, the court described academic freedom as "a special concern of the First Amendment which does not tolerate laws that cast a pall of orthodoxy over the classroom", which they characterized as "a marketplace of ideas". The decision was written by Justice William J. Brennan Jr. In 1987, the twentieth anniversary of the Keyishian decision, Harry Keyishian and fellow-litigant George Hochfield were interviewed by Bill Moyers in the PBS series In Search of the Constitution. To mark the fiftieth anniversary of the decision, the American Association of University Professors honored Keyishian on June 17, 2017 at its annual awards luncheon "for his courage, integrity, and unstinting commitment to academic freedom".

Keyishian defended his dissertation, Thomas Dekker and the Rival Traditions, at New York University in 1965, supervised by Professor Elkin Calhoun Wilson, and joined the faculty at Fairleigh Dickinson University in the same year. In 1976, he became Director of Fairleigh Dickinson University Press, succeeding Charles Angoff in this role. He retired as professor in 2010 but continued as Director of Fairleigh Dickinson University Press until 2017, during which he served on the Editorial Board. During the period from 1976 until 2017, partnering originally with Associated University Presses and, from 2010, with Rowman & Littlefield, the press published approximately 1200 volumes. At least one FDUP book, The Horse in Early Modern England by Kevin De Ornellas, was dedicated to Keyishian.

From 1976 to 1985, Keyishian served as co-editor, with Martin Green and Walter Cummins, of The Literary Review: An International Journal of Contemporary Writing. His published books are Michael Arlen (1976), Collected Essays on William Saroyan (1996), The Shapes of Revenge: Victimization, Vindictiveness, and Vengeance in Shakespeare (1996), and Screening Politics (2003). He also published numerous essays and reviews in scholarly journals and magazines on a range of literary and theatrical topics. From 1992 to 2018, he organized annual Shakespeare Colloquiums that brought speakers to campus each October for an audience of teachers, students, and the general public. He wrote extensively for and served on the Editorial Board of the quarterly journal Ararat Quarterly, published by the Armenian General Benevolent Union. He was a member of the Modern Language Association, the Shakespeare Association of America, the International Shakespeare Association, and the Columbia University Seminar on Shakespeare.

In 1965, he married Marjorie Ann Deiter, a poet, fiction writer, and journalist who also taught at Fairleigh Dickinson University. She died in 2022. They raised four daughters, and lived in Morristown, New Jersey.

Keyishian died in Morristown, New Jersey, on April 4, 2026, five days before his 94th birthday.

== Bibliography ==
=== Books ===
- Screening Politics: The Politician in American Movies, 1931-2001 (2003) ISBN 0-810-84581-4
- The Shapes of Revenge: Victimization, Vengeance, and Vindictiveness in Shakespeare (1995; reissued in paperback, 2003) ISBN 1-591-02216-9
- Critical Essays on William Saroyan (1995) ISBN 0-783-80018-5
- Michael Arlen (1975) ISBN 0-805-71011-6

=== Dissertation ===
- Thomas Dekker and the Rival Traditions

== Sources ==
- Heins, Marjorie (2013). Priests of Our Democracy: The Supreme Court, Academic Freedom, and the Anti-Communist Purge. New York: New York University Press.
