= 2nd Critics' Choice Awards =

1997 US film awards

2nd Critics' Choice Movie Awards
- Date: January 20, 1997
- Official website: www.criticschoice.com

Highlights
- Best Film: Fargo

The 2nd Critics' Choice Movie Awards were presented on January 20, 1997, honoring the finest achievements of 1996 filmmaking.

== Top 10 films ==
(in alphabetical order)

- Big Night
- The Crucible
- The English Patient
- Evita
- Fargo
- Hamlet
- Jerry Maguire
- Lone Star
- The People vs. Larry Flynt
- Shine

== Winners ==
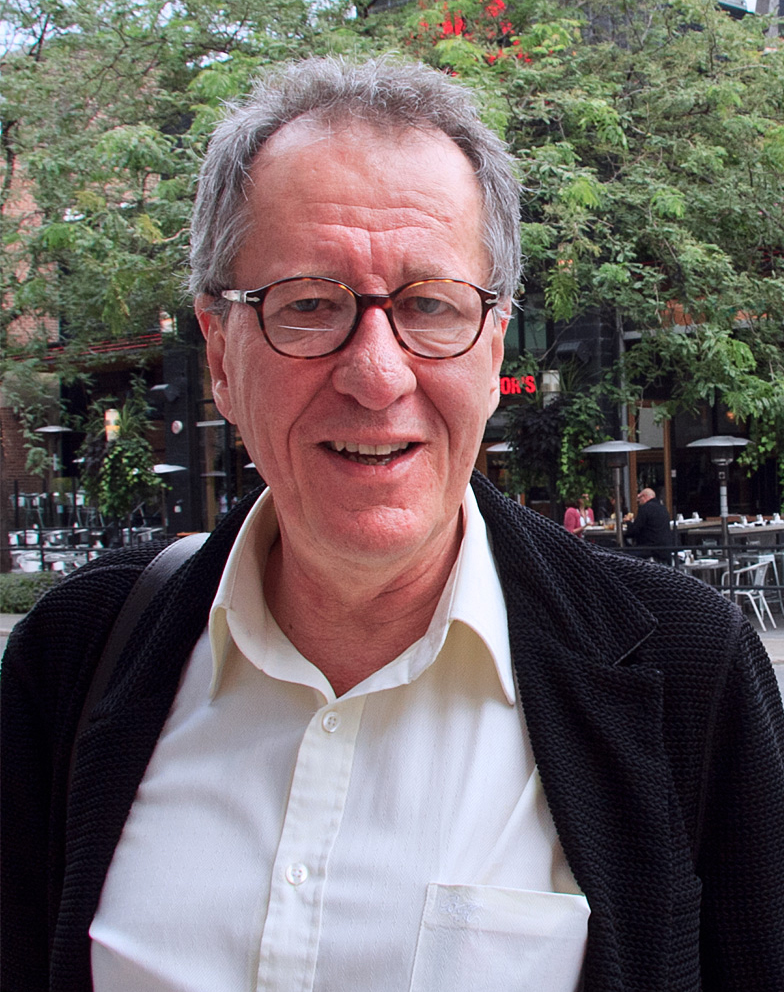
Geoffrey Rush, Best Actor winner

Frances McDormand, Best Actress winner

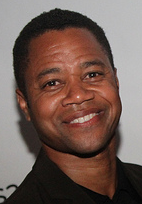
Cuba Gooding Jr., Best Supporting Actor winner

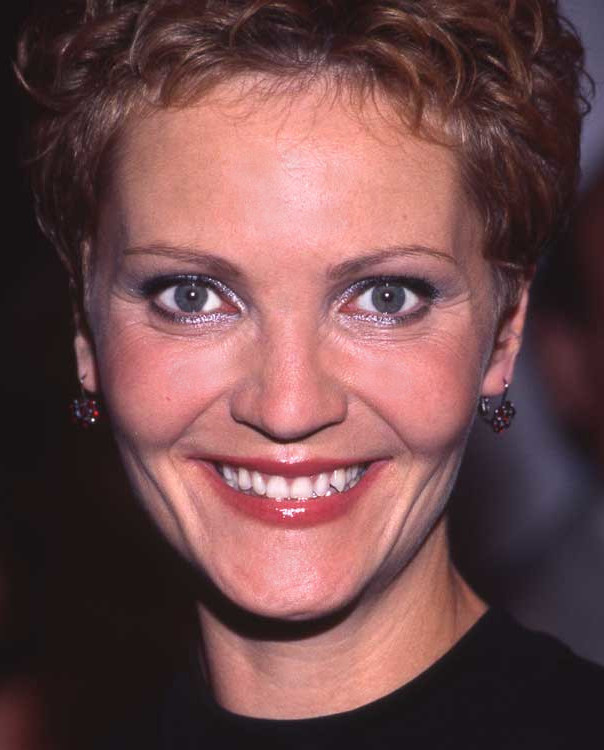
Joan Allen, Best Supporting Actress winner

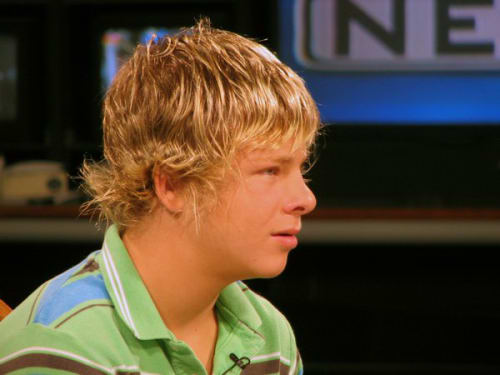
Jonathan Lipnicki, Best Child Performance winner

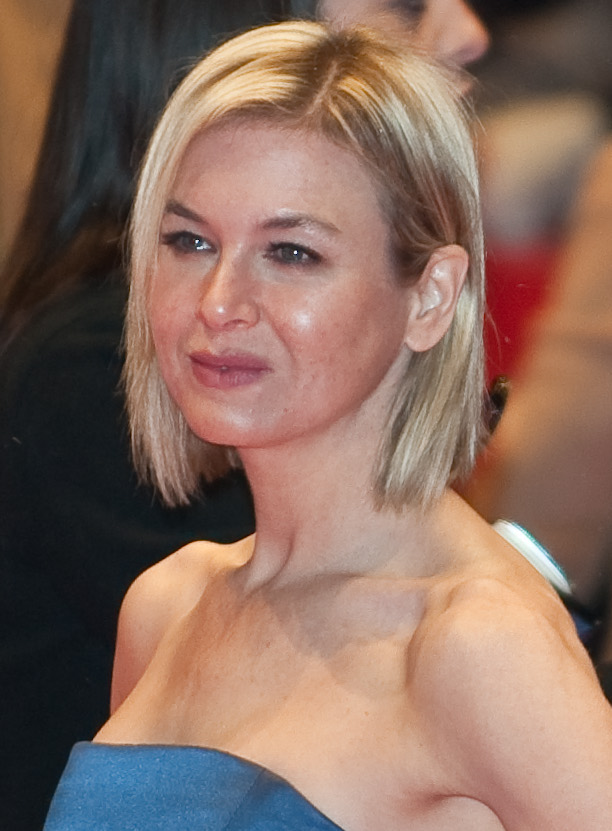
Renée Zellweger, Breakout Artist of the Year winner

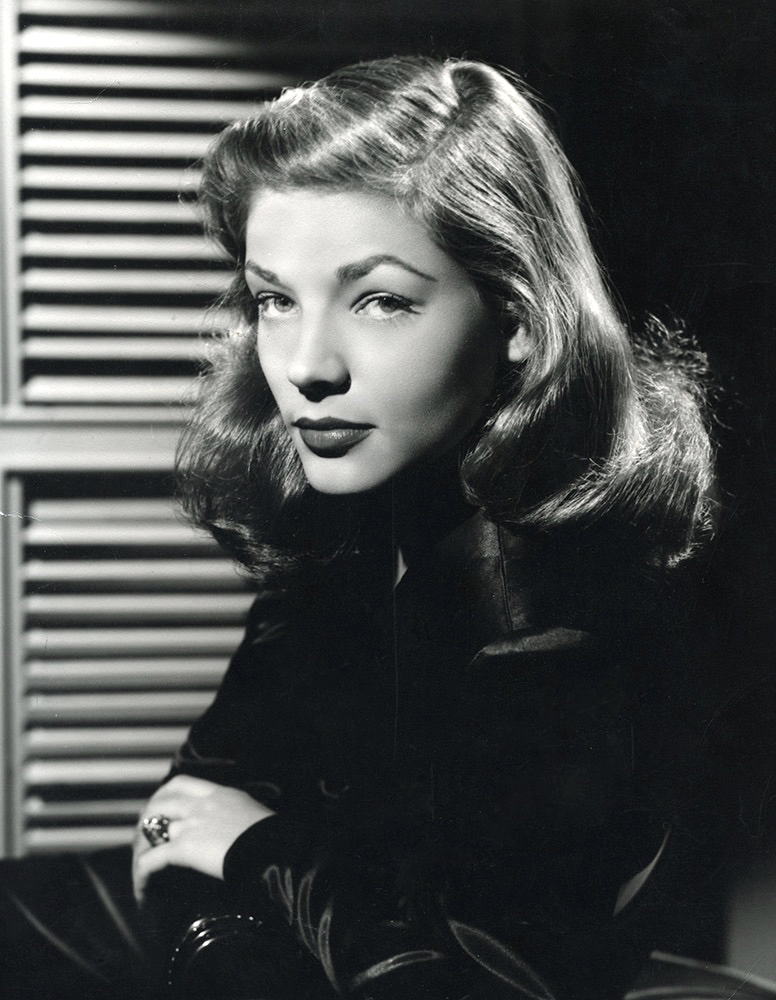
Lauren Bacall, Lifetime Achievement Award winner

- Best Actor:
  - Geoffrey Rush – Shine
- Best Actress:
  - Frances McDormand – Fargo
- Best Child Performance:
  - Jonathan Lipnicki – Jerry Maguire
- Best Director:
  - Anthony Minghella – The English Patient
- Best Documentary:
  - When We Were Kings
- Best Family Film:
  - Fly Away Home
- Best Foreign Language Film:
  - Ridicule • France
- Best Picture:
  - Fargo
- Best Screenplay:
  - The English Patient – Anthony Minghella
- Best Supporting Actor:
  - Cuba Gooding Jr. – Jerry Maguire
- Best Supporting Actress:
  - Joan Allen – The Crucible
- Breakout Artist of the Year:
  - Renée Zellweger – Jerry Maguire
- Lifetime Achievement Award:
  - Lauren Bacall
