= List of awards and nominations received by Nicolas Cage =

Nicolas Cage awards and nominations
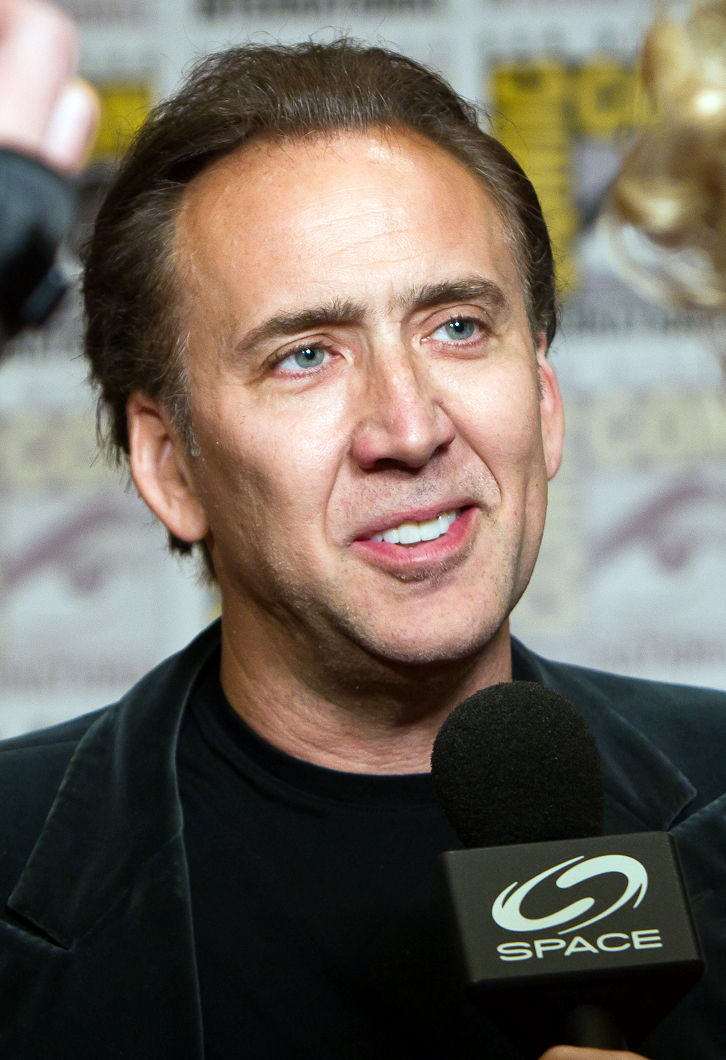
- Cage at San Diego Comic-Con in 2011
Awards and nominations
Award	Wins	Nominations
Golden Globe	1	5
Academy Awards	1	2
BAFTA Awards	0	2
Screen Actors Guild Awards	1	3

The following is a list of awards and nominations received by American actor, director, and producer Nicolas Cage.

In 1987, Cage earned critical success with films such as the Coen brothers' Raising Arizona (1987) and John Patrick Shanley's Moonstruck (1987) before earning an Academy Award for Best Actor for his performance in Leaving Las Vegas (1995).

Following his awards win he starred in the award winning blockbusters The Rock (1996), and Con Air (1997) as well as the drama Face/Off (1997) and the romantic drama City of Angels (1998). He starred in Martin Scorsese's drama Bringing Out the Dead and Charlie Kauffman's Adaptation, the latter earning him his second Academy Award nomination.

He has since received nominations for best and worst actor for his role in the National Treasure films in 2004, 2007 and was nominated for worst actor again for the Ghost Rider films in 2007 and 2011. In the 21st century he has earned renewed critical acclaim for his performances in independent dramas such as Joe (2013), Mandy (2018), Color Out of Space (2019), and Pig (2021), the latter earning him a Critics' Choice Movie Award for Best Actor nomination.

== Major associations ==
=== Academy Awards ===
Year	Category	Nominated work	Result	Ref.
1996	Best Actor	Leaving Las Vegas	Won	
2003	Best Actor	Adaptation	Nominated	

=== British Academy Film Awards ===
Year	Category	Nominated work	Result	Ref.
1996	Best Actor in a Leading Role	Leaving Las Vegas	Nominated	
2003	Best Actor in a Leading Role	Adaptation	Nominated	

=== Critics' Choice Movie Awards ===
Year	Category	Nominated work	Result	Ref.
1996	Best Actor	Leaving Las Vegas	Nominated	
2022	Best Actor	Pig	Nominated	

=== Golden Globe Awards ===
Year	Category	Nominated work	Result	Ref.
1988	Best Actor in a Motion Picture – Musical or Comedy	Moonstruck	Nominated	
1993	Best Actor in a Motion Picture – Musical or Comedy	Honeymoon in Vegas	Nominated	
1996	Best Actor in a Motion Picture – Drama	Leaving Las Vegas	Won	
2003	Best Actor in a Motion Picture – Musical or Comedy	Adaptation	Nominated	
2024	Best Actor in a Motion Picture – Musical or Comedy	Dream Scenario	Nominated	

=== Independent Spirit Awards ===
Year	Category	Nominated work	Result	Ref.
1990	Best Male Lead	Vampire's Kiss	Nominated	
1996	Best Male Lead	Leaving Las Vegas	Nominated	

=== Screen Actors Guild Awards ===
Year	Category	Nominated work	Result	Ref.
1996	Outstanding Performance by a Male Actor in a Leading Role	Leaving Las Vegas	Won	
2003	Outstanding Performance by a Male Actor in a Leading Role	Adaptation	Nominated	
2003	Outstanding Performance by a Cast in a Motion Picture	Adaptation	Nominated	

== Critics awards ==
=== Boston Society of Film Critics ===
Year	Nominated work	Category	Result	Ref.
1995	Leaving Las Vegas	Best Actor	Won	

=== Chicago Film Critics Association ===
Year	Nominated work	Category	Result	Ref.
1996	Leaving Las Vegas	Best Actor	Won	
2003	Adaptation	Best Actor	Nominated	
2021	Pig	Best Actor	Nominated	

=== Critics' Choice Super Awards ===
Year	Category	Nominated work	Result	Ref.
2022	Best Actor in a Horror Movie	Willy's Wonderland	Nominated	
2023	Best Actor in an Action Movie	The Unbearable Weight of Massive Talent	Nominated	
2024	Best Actor in a Horror Movie	Dream Scenario	Won	

=== Dallas–Fort Worth Film Critics Association ===
Year	Nominated work	Category	Result	Ref.
1996	Leaving Las Vegas	Best Actor	Won	
2003	Adaptation	Best Actor	Nominated	

=== London Film Critics' Circle ===
Year	Nominated work	Category	Result	Ref.
2004	Adaptation	Actor of the Year	Nominated	

=== Los Angeles Film Critics Association ===
Year	Nominated work	Category	Result	Ref.
1995	Leaving Las Vegas	Best Actor	Won	

=== National Board of Review ===
Year	Nominated work	Category	Result	Ref.
1995	Leaving Las Vegas	Best Actor	Won	
2005	Lord of War	Special Recognition For Excellence in Filmmaking (as producer)	Won	

=== National Society of Film Critics ===
Year	Nominated work	Category	Result	Ref.
1996	Leaving Las Vegas	Best Actor	Won	
2010	Bad Lieutenant: Port of Call New Orleans	Best Actor	Nominated	

=== New York Film Critics Circle ===
Year	Nominated work	Category	Result	Ref.
1995	Leaving Las Vegas	Best Actor	Won	

=== Online Film Critics Society ===
Year	Nominated work	Category	Result	Ref.
2003	Adaptation	Best Ensemble	Nominated	
2003	Adaptation	Best Actor	Nominated	
2022	Pig	Best Actor	Nominated	

=== San Diego Film Critics Society ===
Year	Nominated Work	Category	Result	Ref.
2023	Dream Scenario, The Flash, The Old Way, Renfield, The Retirement Plan, Sympathy for the Devil	Special Award for Body of Work	Won	

=== St. Louis Film Critics Association ===
Year	Nominated work	Category	Result	Ref.
2021	Pig	Best Actor	Won	

=== Toronto Film Critics Association ===
Year	Nominated work	Category	Result	Ref.
2002	Adaptation	Best Actor	Won	
2009	Bad Lieutenant: Port of Call New Orleans	Best Actor	Won	

=== Vancouver Film Critics Circle ===
Year	Nominated work	Category	Result	Ref.
2003	Adaptation	Best Actor	Nominated	

=== Women Film Critics Circle ===
Year	Nominated work	Category	Result	Ref.
2005	Lord of War	Most Offensive Male Character	Won	

== Film festivals ==
=== Catalina Film Festival ===
Year	Nominated work	Category	Result	Ref.
2014	Joe	Charlie Chaplin ICON Award	Won	

=== Cairo International Film Festival ===
Year	Nominated work	Category	Result	Ref.
2017	—N/a	Career Achievement Award	Honored	

=== Chicago International Film Festival ===
Year	Nominated work	Category	Result	Ref.
2003	—N/a	Career Achievement Award	Won	

=== Deauville American Film Festival ===
Year	Nominated work	Category	Result	Ref.
2002	Sonny	Grand Special Prize	Nominated	

=== Giffoni Film Festival ===
Year	Nominated work	Category	Result	Ref.
2012	Kick Ass	Giffoni Experience Award	Won	

=== Ischia Global Film & Music Festival ===
Year	Nominated work	Category	Result	Ref.
2013	The Frozen Ground	Ischia Legend Award	Won	

=== Palm Springs International Film Festival ===
Year	Nominated work	Category	Result	Ref.
2001	—N/a	Desert Palm Achievement Award	Won	

=== San Francisco International Film Festival ===
Year	Nominated work	Category	Result	Ref.
1998	—N/a	Peter J. Owens Award	Won	
2023	Lifetime Achievement	Maria Manetti Shrem Lifetime Achievement Award for Acting	Awarded	

=== San Sebastián International Film Festival ===
Year	Nominated work	Category	Result	Ref.
1995	Leaving Las Vegas	Silver Shell for Best Actor	Won	

=== Transilvania International Film Festival ===
Year	Nominated work	Category	Result	Ref.
2019	—N/a	Transilvanian Trophy for Special Contribution to World Cinema	Won	

=== Toronto Film Festival ===
Year	Nominated work	Category	Result	Ref.
2019	Color Out of Space	Creative Coalition's Spotlight Initiative Award	Won	

== Miscellaneous awards ==
=== American Comedy Awards ===
Year	Nominated work	Category	Result	Ref.
1988	Raising Arizona	Funniest Actor in a Motion Picture (Leading Role)	Nominated	
1993	Honeymoon in Vegas	Funniest Actor in a Motion Picture (Leading Role)	Nominated	

=== Annie Awards ===
Year	Nominated work	Category	Result	Ref.
2021	The Croods: A New Age	Best Voice Acting in a Feature Production	Nominated	

=== ALOS Awards ===
Year	Nominated work	Category	Result	Ref.
2018	Dog Eat Dog	Best Actor in a Leading Role	Nominated	

=== Blockbuster Entertainment Awards ===
Year	Nominated work	Category	Result	Ref.
1997	The Rock	Favorite Actor – Action/Adventure	Won	
1998	Con Air, Face/Off	Favorite Actor – Action/Adventure	Won	
1999	City of Angels	Favorite Actor – Drama/Romance	Won	
1999	Snake Eyes	Favorite Actor – Suspense	Won	
2001	The Family Man	Favorite Actor – Comedy/Romance	Won	
2001	Gone in 60 Seconds	Favorite Actor – Action	Nominated	

=== Goldene Kamera Awards ===
Year	Nominated work	Category	Result	Ref.
2007	World Trade Center	Best International Actor	Won	

=== Golden Raspberry Awards ===
Year	Nominated work	Category	Result	Ref.
2007	The Wicker Man	Worst Picture	Nominated	
2007	The Wicker Man	Worst Remake, Rip-off or Sequel	Nominated	
2007	The Wicker Man	Worst Screen Couple	Nominated	
2007	The Wicker Man	Worst Actor	Nominated	
2008	Ghost Rider, National Treasure: Book of Secrets, Next	Worst Actor	Nominated	
2012	Drive Angry, Season of the Witch, Trespass	Worst Actor	Nominated	
2012	Drive Angry, Season of the Witch, Trespass	Worst Screen Couple	Nominated	
2013	A Thousand Words	Worst Picture	Nominated	
2013	Ghost Rider: Spirit of Vengeance, Seeking Justice	Worst Actor	Nominated	
2015	Left Behind	Worst Actor	Nominated	
2017	Snowden	Worst Supporting Actor	Nominated	
2022	Pig	Razzie Redeemer Award	Nominated	
2026	Gunslingers	Worst Supporting Actor	Nominated	

=== Jupiter Award ===
Year	Nominated work	Category	Result	Ref.
1997	Leaving Las Vegas, The Rock	Best International Actor	Won	
1998	Con Air, Face/Off	Best International Actor	Won	
2006	National Treasure	Best International Actor	Nominated	

=== MTV Movie and TV Awards ===
Year	Nominated work	Category	Result	Ref.
1997	The Rock	Best On-Screen Duo	Won	
1998	Face/Off	Best On-Screen Duo	Won	
1998	Face/Off	Best Male Performance	Nominated	
1998	Face/Off	Best Villain	Nominated	
1999	City of Angels	Best On-Screen Duo	Nominated	

=== People's Choice Awards ===
Year	Nominated work	Category	Result	Ref.
2006	Lord of War, The Weather Man	Favorite Motion Picture Actor	Nominated	

=== Political Film Society Award ===
Year	Nominated work	Category	Result	Ref.
2004	The Life of David Gale	Political Film Society Award for Human Rights (as producer)	Nominated	

=== Sant Jordi Awards ===
Year	Nominated work	Category	Result	Ref.
1996	Leaving Las Vegas	Best Foreign Actor	Nominated	

=== Satellite Awards ===
Year	Nominated work	Category	Result	Ref.
2003	Adaptation	Best Actor – Motion Picture Musical or Comedy	Nominated	

=== Saturn Awards ===
Year	Nominated work	Category	Result	Ref.
1998	Face/Off	Best Actor	Nominated	
2019	Mandy	Best Actor	Nominated	
2024	Renfield	Best Supporting Actor	Won	
2025	Dream Scenario	Best Actor	Won	
2025	Longlegs	Best Supporting Actor	Nominated	

=== Scream Awards ===
Year	Nominated work	Category	Result	Ref.
2009	Knowing	Best Science Fiction Actor	Nominated	
2010	Kick-Ass	Best Fantasy Actor	Nominated	
2010	Kick-Ass	Best Superhero	Nominated	

=== Stinkers Bad Movie Awards ===
Year	Nominated work	Category	Result	Ref.
2001	Captain Corelli's Mandolin	Most Annoying Fake Accent: Male	Won	
2001	Captain Corelli's Mandolin	Worst On-Screen Couple	Nominated	
2006	The Wicker Man	Worst Actor	Nominated	

=== Teen Choice Awards ===
Year	Nominated work	Category	Result	Ref.
2010	Kick-Ass	Choice Movie Actor: Action	Nominated	

=== Visual Effects Society ===
Year	Nominated work	Category	Result	Ref.
2003	Adaptation	Best Performance by an Actor in an Effects Film	Nominated	
