= Leaving Las Vegas (disambiguation) =

Leaving Las Vegas is a 1995 film starring Nicolas Cage.

Leaving Las Vegas may also refer to:

- Leaving Las Vegas (novel), a 1990 novel by John O'Brien; basis for the film
- "Leaving Las Vegas" (song), a song by Sheryl Crow
- "Leaving Las Vegas" (CSI), an episode of CSI: Crime Scene Investigation
- "Leaving Las Vegas" (Shark), an episode of Shark
