= Erin O'Brien =

Erin O'Brien may refer to:

- Erin O'Brien (actress) (1934-2021), American actress
- Erin O'Brien (writer) (born 1965), American writer
- Erin O'Brien-Moore (1902–1979), American actress
- Erin O'Brien, American actress known for Fight Valley and One Penny
