= Mighty Aphrodite =

1995 film by Woody Allen

- Theatrical release poster
- Directed by: Woody Allen
- Written by: Woody Allen
- Produced by: Letty Aronson; Robert Greenhut
- Starring: F. Murray Abraham; Woody Allen; Claire Bloom; Helena Bonham Carter; Olympia Dukakis; Michael Rapaport; Mira Sorvino; David Ogden Stiers; Jack Warden; Peter Weller
- Cinematography: Carlo Di Palma
- Edited by: Susan E. Morse
- Music by: Dick Hyman
- Production company: Sweetland Films
- Distributed by: Miramax Films
- Release date: October 27, 1995 (United States)
- Running time: 95 minutes
- Country: United States
- Language: English
- Budget: $15 million
- Box office: $26 million

Mighty Aphrodite is a 1995 American comedy film written, directed by, and co-starring Woody Allen, alongside Mira Sorvino, Helena Bonham Carter, Michael Rapaport, and F. Murray Abraham. The screenplay revolves around a sportswriter named Lenny Weinrib (Allen) and his search for his genius adopted son's biological mother, ultimately finding that she is a dim-witted prostitute named Linda Ash (Sorvino).

Critical reception of the film was generally positive, with Sorvino earning high praise for her performance. She won several accolades, including the Academy Award and Golden Globe Award for Best Supporting Actress, and was nominated for the BAFTA Award and SAG Award in the same category. Allen's screenplay earned him a nomination for the Academy Award for Best Original Screenplay.

== Plot ==
At the ruins of an ancient Greek theatre in Taormina, Sicily, a Greek chorus introduces and narrates the story of Lenny Weinrib. Lenny is a sportswriter in Manhattan, married to the ambitious art curator Amanda. The couple adopts a baby boy and names him Max. As Lenny spends more time with Max it becomes evident that the child is remarkably gifted. Intrigued, Lenny becomes obsessed with uncovering the identity of Max's biological mother.

After an extensive search Lenny discovers that Max's biological mother is a prostitute and part-time porn star who goes by various names. She reveals her birth name as Leslie Ash and expresses her preference for being called Linda because it means "pretty" in Spanish. Lenny arranges to meet Linda at her apartment but does not engage in any intimate activities. Instead he encourages her to leave her current lifestyle behind and pursue a more wholesome life. Linda reacts angrily, returning Lenny's money and demanding that he leave.

Undeterred, Lenny remains determined to befriend Linda and improve her circumstances. He helps Linda escape her abusive pimp and then tries to match her up with a boxer named Kevin. Initially they seem like a well-matched couple but their relationship sours when Kevin discovers Linda's background.

Meanwhile Lenny and Amanda's marriage begins to falter owing to Lenny's preoccupation with Linda, Amanda's career ambitions, and her affair with her colleague Jerry. Amanda eventually confesses to Lenny that she wants to explore her relationship with Jerry. However, Lenny and Linda find solace in each other following their respective breakups and end up consummating their relationship. The next day, though, Lenny reconciles with Amanda, realizing that they are still deeply in love.

Linda unsuccessfully tries to win back Kevin. While driving back to Manhattan she witnesses a helicopter landing and offers a lift to the pilot, Don. The Greek chorus reveals that Linda and Don will eventually marry, although Linda is now pregnant with Lenny's child. About a year later Linda (with her infant daughter) and Lenny (with Max) meet by chance in a toy store. Unaware of the connection, Linda expresses her gratitude to Lenny for his help and leaves him stunned. In conclusion, the Greek chorus performs a lively song and dance routine.

== Cast ==
- Woody Allen as Lenny Weinrib
- Mira Sorvino as Linda Ash
- Helena Bonham Carter as Amanda Sloan Weinrib
- Michael Rapaport as Kevin
- F. Murray Abraham as Greek Chorus Leader
- Olympia Dukakis as Jocasta
- David Ogden Stiers as Laius
- Jack Warden as Tiresias
- Danielle Ferland as Cassandra
- Peter Weller as Jerry Bender
- Claire Bloom as Mrs Sloan
- Paul Herman as Rick's Friend
- Paul Giamatti as Extras Guild Researcher
- Sondra James as The Chorus Voices

== Soundtrack ==
- Neo Minore - Written and performed by Vasilis Tsitsanis
- Manhattan (1925) - Music by Richard Rodgers - Lyrics by Lorenz Hart - Performed by Carmen Cavallaro
- Penthouse Serenade (1952) - Written by Will Jason and Val Burton - Performed by Erroll Garner
- You Do Something to Me (1929) - Written by Cole Porter - Performed by Dick Hyman
- Take Five (1959) - Written by Paul Desmond - Performed by Dave Brubeck Quartet
- The 'In' Crowd (1965) - Written by Billy Page - Performed by Ramsey Lewis
- Li'l Darlin' (1957) - Written by Neal Hefti - Performed by Count Basie and His Orchestra
- FAO Schwarz Clock Tower Song - Written and performed by Bobby Gosh
- Horos Tou Sakena - Written by Stavros Xarhakos - Featuring by Giorgos Zambetas
- Whispering (1919) - Music by Richard Coburn, Vincent Rose, and John Schonberger - Performed by Benny Goodman and His Orchestra
- I've Found a New Baby (1926) - Written by Jack Palmer and Spencer Williams - Performed by Wilbur De Paris
- I Hadn't Anyone Till You (1938) - Written by Ray Noble - Performed by Erroll Garner
- When Your Lover Has Gone (1931) - Written by E.A. Swan - Performed by Bert Ambrose and His Orchestra
- Walkin' My Baby Back Home (1930) - Music by Fred E. Ahlert - Lyrics by Roy Turk - Performed by Dick Hyman
- When You're Smiling (1928) - Written by Mark Fisher, Joe Goodwin and Larry Shay - Performed by Dick Hyman

== Production ==
Dick Hyman served as the film's music coordinator, arranger, and conductor. The soundtrack includes "Neo Minore" performed by Vassilis Tsitsanis, "Horos Tou Sakena" by Stavros Xarchakos, "I've Found a New Baby" by Wilbur de Paris, "Whispering" by Benny Goodman & His Orchestra, "Manhattan" by Carmen Cavallaro, "When Your Lover Has Gone" by Ambrose & His Orchestra, "L'il Darlin" by Count Basie & His Orchestra, "Take Five" by the Dave Brubeck Quartet, "Penthouse Serenade (When We're Alone)" and "I Hadn't Anyone Till You" by Erroll Garner, "The 'In' Crowd" by Ramsey Lewis, and "You Do Something to Me" and "When You're Smiling" by the Dick Hyman Chorus & Orchestra. Graciela Daniele choreographed the dance routines.

The Greek chorus includes George de la Peña and Pamela Blair. Tony Sirico and Paul Giamatti make brief appearances in minor roles.

Manhattan locations include Bowling Green, Central Park, and FAO Schwarz. Additional exteriors were filmed in North Tarrytown and Quogue. The Greek chorus scenes were filmed in the Teatro antico in Taormina on the island of Sicily.

Mira Sorvino mentioned in a 2011 interview that she chose Linda's voice to be high and gravelly since "high voice kind of makes you sound less intellectually gifted, and the gravelly part just added this kind of rough-and-tumble, been-to-the-school-of-hard-knocks element to it." Four weeks into the production, Allen spoke with Sorvino asking if she had ever wondered about using a different voice. Sorvino stated that the voice affected how she approached the character, and that if she changed the voice the character changed. When she pointed out that they were four weeks into the movie Allen said, "Oh, that doesn't matter. I have it written into my budget that I can reshoot the entire movie if I want."

In real life Leonard "Lenny" Weinrib was the name of an American actor, voice actor and writer known for playing the title role in the children's television show H.R. Pufnstuf. He died in 2006.

== Release ==
Mighty Aphrodite debuted at the Toronto International Film Festival before going into limited release in the United States. It opened on 19 screens and earned $326,494 its opening weekend. It eventually grossed $6,401,297 in the US and $19,598,703 in international markets for a total worldwide box office of $26 million.

== Reception ==
=== Critical response ===
On Rotten Tomatoes, the film has an approval rating of 78% based on reviews from 37 critics, with an average rating of 6.9/10. The site's consensus states: "Mighty Aphrodite may not stand with Woody Allen's finest work, but it's brought to vivid life by a thoroughly winsome performance from Mira Sorvino." On Metacritic it has a score of 59 out of 100 based on 16 reviews from critics, indicating "mixed or average reviews". Audiences surveyed by CinemaScore gave the film a grade "B+" on scale of A+ to F.

In her review in The New York Times, Janet Maslin said, "Even when it becomes unmistakably lightweight, Mighty Aphrodite remains witty, agile and handsomely made."

Roger Ebert of the Chicago Sun-Times called the film "a sunny comedy" and added, "The movie's closing scene is quietly, sweetly ironic, and the whole movie skirts the pitfalls of cynicism and becomes something the Greeks could never quite manage, a potential tragedy with a happy ending."

In the San Francisco Chronicle, Leah Garchik said the film was "an inventive movie, imaginative and rich in detail" and added, "Woody Allen's incredible wit is at the heart of all that's wonderful in Mighty Aphrodite, and Woody Allen's incredible ego is at the core of its major flaw . . . He fails when he attempts . . . to get the audience to suspend its disbelief and accept Allen, a withered Romeo, as a sweet-natured naif. The crotchety charm of the shy and awkward characters he played as a young man has worn off; nowadays, he comes across as just plain crotchety."

Peter Travers of Rolling Stone said, "The film is a showcase for Sorvino, actor Paul's Harvard-grad daughter, who gives a sensational performance. She shows startling humor and heart without trading on sentiment."

In Variety, Todd McCarthy described the film as "a zippy, frothy confection that emerges as agreeable middle-range Woody . . . There is perhaps a bit too much of the chorus galavanting about delivering their increasingly colloquial admonitions and too few convulsive laughs, but the writer-director has generally pitched the humor at a pleasing and relatively consistent level . . . The film's biggest surprise, and attraction, is Sorvino . . . [who] goes way beyond the whore-with-a-heart-of-gold externals of the part in developing a deeply sympathetic and appealing character. None of the diverse roles she has done to date would have suggested her for this part, but this gutsy performance will put her much more prominently on the map."

=== Accolades ===
| Award | Category | Nominee(s) | Result | Ref. |
|---|---|---|---|---|
| Academy Awards | Best Supporting Actress | Mira Sorvino | Won | |
| Academy Awards | Best Screenplay – Written Directly for the Screen | Woody Allen | Nominated | |
| American Choreography Awards | Outstanding Achievement in Feature Film | Graciela Daniele | Won | |
| Artios Awards | Best Casting for Feature Film – Comedy | Juliet Taylor | Nominated | |
| British Academy Film Awards | Best Actress in a Supporting Role | Mira Sorvino | Nominated | |
| Butaca Awards | Best Art House Film | | Won | |
| Chicago Film Critics Association Awards | Best Supporting Actress | Mira Sorvino | Nominated | |
| Chlotrudis Awards | Best Supporting Actress | Mira Sorvino | Won | |
| Critics' Choice Awards | Best Supporting Actress | Mira Sorvino | Won | |
| Dallas–Fort Worth Film Critics Association Awards | Best Supporting Actress | Mira Sorvino | Won | |
| David di Donatello Awards | Best Foreign Film | Woody Allen | Nominated | |
| David di Donatello Awards | Best Foreign Director | Woody Allen | Nominated | |
| Golden Globe Awards | Best Supporting Actress – Motion Picture | Mira Sorvino | Won | |
| Los Angeles Film Critics Association Awards | Best Supporting Actress | Mira Sorvino | Nominated | |
| Nastro d'Argento | Best Cinematography | Carlo Di Palma | Won | |
| National Board of Review Awards | Top Ten Films | | 6th Place | |
| National Board of Review Awards | Best Supporting Actress | Mira Sorvino | Won | |
| National Society of Film Critics Awards | Best Supporting Actress | Mira Sorvino | Nominated | |
| New York Film Critics Circle Awards | Best Supporting Actress | Mira Sorvino | Won | |
| Screen Actors Guild Awards | Outstanding Performance by a Female Actor in a Supporting Role | Mira Sorvino | Nominated | |
| Southeastern Film Critics Association Awards | Best Supporting Actress | Mira Sorvino | Won | |
| Writers Guild of America Awards | Best Screenplay – Written Directly for the Screen | Woody Allen | Nominated | |
