= John O'Brien (novelist) =

American novelist (1960–1994)

- O’Brien in 1993
- Born: May 21, 1960; Oxford, Ohio, U.S.
- Died: April 10, 1994 (aged 33); Beverly Hills, California, U.S.
- Other name: Carroll Mine
- Years active: 1990–1994
- Notable work: Leaving Las Vegas
- Spouse: Lisa Kirkwood (m. 1979; div. 1992)

John O'Brien (May 21, 1960 – April 10, 1994) was an American author, known for his debut novel Leaving Las Vegas.

He was the brother of writer Erin O'Brien. John grew up in Brecksville and Lakewood, Ohio, and graduated from Lakewood High School in 1978. Through a friend of his ex-wife, O'Brien got a gig writing Episode 37 of the animated series Rugrats, "Toys in the Attic", which premiered in 1992 under his only known pseudonym, Carroll Mine. According to his sister, Erin, he was disgusted with editorial changes made to his script. His first novel, Leaving Las Vegas, was published in 1990 by Watermark Press and made into a film of the same name in 1995.

O'Brien married Lisa Kirkwood in 1979, and the couple moved to Los Angeles, California, in 1982. They divorced in 1992, at his initiative. His first novel, Leaving Las Vegas, is dedicated to her. He was a fan of singer-songwriter Stevie Nicks and admired Star Trek: The Original Series. O'Brien suffered from alcoholism and had been "in and out of rehab for years" before his death.

O'Brien died from suicide on April 10, 1994, two weeks after signing away the rights to adapt his novel, Leaving Las Vegas. His father and book critics said that the novel was his suicide note, while his sister, Erin O'Brien, thought the book was "the beautiful poetic way to check out: Taking that long slug of liquor and gurgling into his death with this beautiful woman."

== Composition and publication history ==
Leaving Las Vegas was the only of O'Brien's works published during his lifetime. Its composition was preceded by a short story, "The Tik", that would not see publication until the 2008 collection Las Vegas Noir. O'Brien wrote "The Tik" in January 1988 and began Leaving Las Vegas later that year.

O'Brien went on to finish two additional novels during his lifetime. Better (Akashic Books, 2009), the last of his works to receive posthumous publication, was begun by the spring of 1990 while Leaving Las Vegas was still in press. Work on Stripper Lessons (Grove Press, 1997) was started in 1992.

The Assault on Tony's (Grove Press, 1996), the first of O'Brien's posthumous novels, is his last written work. It was begun in April 1993 and left incomplete at the time of his suicide. In addition to a nearly completed draft, O'Brien had composed an outline and copious notes. These were used by his sister Erin to finish the novel prior to its publication.

== Bibliography ==
- O'Brien, John (1990). Leaving Las Vegas. Wichita, Kansas: Watermark Press. ISBN 978-0-922820-12-2. OCLC 22766437.
- O'Brien, John (1996). The Assault on Tony's. New York: Grove Press. ISBN 978-0-8021-1592-8. OCLC 34149431.
- O'Brien, John (1997). Stripper Lessons. New York: Grove Press. ISBN 978-0-8021-3507-0. OCLC 35593676.
- O'Brien, John (2008). "The Tik". In Keene, Jarret; Pierce, Todd James (eds.). Las Vegas noir. Brooklyn, New York: Akashic Books. ISBN 978-1933354491. OCLC 182529221.
- O'Brien, John (2009). Better: a novel. Brooklyn, New York: Akashic Books. ISBN 978-1933354828. OCLC 373484234.
