= To Die For =

1995 film by Gus Van Sant

- Theatrical release poster
- Directed by: Gus Van Sant
- Screenplay by: Buck Henry
- Based on: To Die For; 1992 novel by Joyce Maynard
- Produced by: Laura Ziskin
- Starring: Nicole Kidman; Joaquin Phoenix; Matt Dillon
- Cinematography: Eric Alan Edwards
- Edited by: Curtiss Clayton
- Music by: Danny Elfman
- Production companies: Columbia Pictures; Rank Film Distributors; Laura Ziskin Productions
- Distributed by: Sony Pictures Releasing (North America); Rank-Castle Rock/Turner (United Kingdom)
- Release dates: May 20, 1995 (Cannes); October 6, 1995 (United States); October 27, 1995 (United Kingdom)
- Running time: 106 minutes
- Countries: United States; United Kingdom
- Language: English
- Budget: $20 million
- Box office: $41 million

To Die For is a 1995 black comedy film directed by Gus Van Sant. It stars Nicole Kidman, Joaquin Phoenix and Matt Dillon. The plot follows Suzanne Stone, an ambitious New Hampshire woman with dreams of becoming a celebrity, who will stop at nothing until she achieves fame on TV. The film's narrative combines a traditional drama with darkly comic direct-to-camera monologues by Kidman's character, and mockumentary interviews, some tragic, with other characters in the film.

To Die For was written by Buck Henry based on Joyce Maynard's novel of the same title, which in turn was inspired by the story of Pamela Smart, a woman who was convicted in 1991 for being an accomplice in a plot to murder her husband. Henry, Maynard, George Segal, and David Cronenberg appear in cameo roles. The film features original music by Danny Elfman.

The film received praise for its satire of the tabloid media, fame, and the true crime genre. The cast was subject to considerable praise, with Kidman earning the best notices in her career at that point. Kidman was nominated for a BAFTA, and won a Golden Globe Award, a Critics' Choice Award, and a Best Actress Award at the 1st Empire Awards for her performance.

== Plot ==
In Little Hope, (Note: Little Hope is a fictional town.) New Hampshire, young ambitious Suzanne Stone is obsessed with being on television, aspiring to become a world-famous broadcast correspondent. But today's headline reads, "Little Hope's own weather (girl) reporter is possible suspect in murder investigation." After her husband Larry Maretto is slain, Suzanne is arrested and labeled "Blonde Temptress" by the tabloids. Moving between past and present, her story plays out in the media, leading up to current events.

Breaking the fourth wall, Suzanne says she prefers her professional surname Stone over her Italian American husband's, and describes her passionate romance with Larry Maretto. For the camera, Larry's sister Janice, who trains for the Ice Follies, voices her low opinion of Suzanne, and how she tried, unsuccessfully, to dissuade her brother from getting involved with "The Ice Maiden".

On day-time television's Laura Show, Suzanne's parents Earl and Carol express their initial disapproval of Larry's education, even suggesting mafia connections in front of Larry's parents, Joe and Angela. Suzanne's sister Faye describes Larry as having "a wild side." Nevertheless, Suzanne marries Larry, and seemingly settles into happily married life, with Larry promising to support her career ambitions. Even during their Florida honeymoon, she attends the National Broadcasters Conference. Its keynote speaker lewdly suggests what she must do to "get a head" in television.

She uses Larry's family restaurant and funeral home businesses for financial stability, while working a low-paying girl Friday job for Ed Grant at the local WWEN cable station, in hopes of climbing the network ladder. Through relentless persistence, she is eventually promoted to the evening weather report.

Local high school delinquent Jimmy Emmett "never gave a rat's ass about the weather," but fantasizing about her, he's the first to sign up for Suzanne's "Teens Speak Out" documentary. Following suit is Lydia Mertz, a shy and insecure girl who admires Suzanne's glamour and worldliness. Fellow-delinquent Russell Hines is threatened by his teacher, Mr. H. Finlaysson, that Suzanne's father-in-law Joe could make one call to a man who would "show up in the middle of the night and turn you into a eunuch" for "your offensive behavior" towards Suzanne. So, Russell signs up as well.

Larry becomes insistent, pressuring Suzanne to quit her career to help the restaurant and start a family. Viewing him as an impediment to her desired future, Suzanne plots his murder. She seduces Jimmy and convinces him to murder, after falsely accusing Larry of abuse and promising Jimmy a future with her in California. She manipulates Lydia to procure the gun. While Suzanne delivers the evening weather report, Jimmy and Russell break into the Marettos' home, and Jimmy kills Larry.

Although Larry's death is ruled the result of a botched burglary, police stumble across damning clips from Teens Speak Out that reveal Suzanne's sexual involvement with Jimmy. The teens are arrested and connected to the crime scene by solid evidence. Lydia makes a deal with police to converse with Suzanne while wearing a wire, and Suzanne unwittingly reveals her hand in the murder. However, despite this damning evidence, she argues that the police resorted to entrapment and is released on bail. All the charges against Suzanne are dropped.

Basking in the media attention and spotlight, Suzanne fabricates a story about Larry becoming a cocaine addict who was murdered by his purported dealers, Jimmy and Russell. Her accusations enrage Joe, who uses his mafia connections for a contract killing. The hitman lures Suzanne away from her home by posing as a movie studio executive, and conceals her dead body beneath the ice of a frozen lake.

Jimmy is sentenced to life in prison, plus thirty years. Russell cops a plea for a reduced sentence of sixteen years. Lydia is released on probation, and tells her side of the story in a televised interview that gains national publicity, making her a celebrity with upcoming appearances on The Oprah Winfrey Show and The Phil Donahue Show.

Having always hated her, Janice dances over Suzanne's corpse, figure skating on the frozen lake under which she lies.

== Cast ==
- Nicole Kidman as Suzanne Stone
  - Amber-Lee Campbell as Suzanne at 6 years old
- Matt Dillon as Larry Maretto
- Joaquin Phoenix as Jimmy Emmett
- Casey Affleck as Russell Hines
- Illeana Douglas as Janice Maretto
- Alison Folland as Lydia Mertz
- Dan Hedaya as Joe Maretto
- Wayne Knight as Ed Grant
- Kurtwood Smith as Earl Stone
- Holland Taylor as Carol Stone
- Maria Tucci as Angela Maretto
- Susan Traylor as Faye Stone
- Tim Hopper as Mike Warden
- Michael Rispoli as Ben DeLuca
- Buck Henry as Mr. H. Finlaysson
- Joyce Maynard as Lawyer
- David Cronenberg as Man at lake
- George Segal as Conference Speaker (uncredited)

== Production ==
=== Development and casting ===
Joyce Maynard's book To Die For was published in 1992. Maynard loosely based the novel on the facts that emerged during the trial of Pamela Smart, a school media services coordinator who was imprisoned for seducing a 16-year-old student and convincing him to kill her husband. The trial had gained considerable media attention because it was one of the first in the U.S. to allow TV cameras in the courtroom. The book came to the attention of producer Laura Ziskin, who passed it along to Amy Pascal, then an executive vice-president of Columbia Pictures, and the studio bought the rights.

Ziskin pitched the film to director Gus Van Sant, who himself had been interested in working with screenwriter Buck Henry. Van Sant enlisted cinematographer Eric Alan Edwards and editor Curtiss Clayton, his previous collaborators on Drugstore Cowboy, My Own Private Idaho, and Even Cowgirls Get the Blues.

Buck [Henry] turned it into more of a satirical comedy. He was also a huge student of the media — 24-hour cable news, like CNN, was becoming popular. The Tonya Harding scandal happened while Buck was writing. Court TV had also just become popular. Suddenly you could see people like Woody Allen and Marlon Brando in court on live TV. Buck was very into all of this.

— Gus Van Sant on the script

The studio envisioned Meg Ryan in the role of Suzanne Stone, but Ryan felt that playing a villainous character would be too edgy for her romantic comedy image at the time. Nicole Kidman, who had been wanting to return to more auteur-driven projects after working in big-budget films like Days of Thunder and Far and Away, lobbied Van Sant for the role and convinced him she was right for the character. "I knew Gus' work from seeing Drugstore Cowboy at an art cinema in Sydney. Those kind of films were basically my cinematic pull", she said. Others who expressed interest in the role were Patricia Arquette and Ellen DeGeneres. Ultimately, Ryan turned down the $5 million salary offered and Kidman was cast for $2 million.

For the role of Jimmy Emmett, Johnny Galecki, Edward Furlong, and Giovanni Ribisi were considered. Matt Damon read for the part and though he had impressed Van Sant in his audition, he was also considered too old to play a teen and had too much of an "all-American" look. The role went to Joaquin Phoenix, whom Van Sant had known from working with Phoenix's late brother River on My Own Private Idaho. For the role of Russel Hines, Damon recommended Casey Affleck, the younger brother of his best friend, Ben Affleck. A number of actresses including Sandra Bullock, Janeane Garofalo, Jennifer Tilly, and DeGeneres read for the role of Janice Maretto before Illeana Douglas was cast.

=== Filming ===
The film was primarily shot in the Port Hope area of Ontario and in Toronto. Principal photography took place from April to June 1994. High school scenes at "Little Hope High" were filmed at King City Secondary School in King City, Ontario, and some actual students of the school were cast as extras.

The honeymoon scenes with Larry and Suzanne were filmed in the Tampa Bay area of Florida.

== Reception ==
=== Critical reception ===
The film was screened out of competition at the 1995 Cannes Film Festival. To Die For was very well received by critics, with Nicole Kidman's performance being especially praised. On the review aggregator website Rotten Tomatoes, 88% of 67 critics' reviews are positive. The website's consensus reads: "Smart, funny, and thoroughly well-cast, To Die For takes a sharp – and sadly prescient – stab at dissecting America's obsession with celebrity." On Metacritic, it has a weighted average score of 86 out of 100, based on reviews from 23 critics, indicating "universal acclaim". Audiences polled by CinemaScore gave the film an average grade of "C+" on an A+ to F scale.

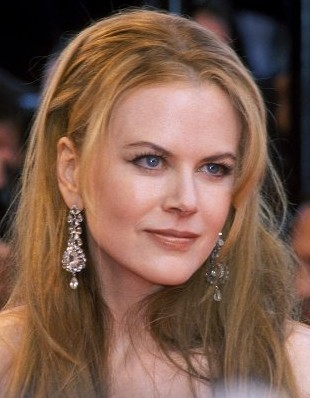
Nicole Kidman received widespread critical praise for her performance, winning the Critics' Choice and Golden Globe, as well as a nomination for the BAFTA

Janet Maslin of The New York Times wrote the film was "irresistible black comedy and a wicked delight", criticizing "tabloid ethics" with "Kidman's teasingly beautiful Suzanne as the most alluring of media-mad monsters." She thought the film showed Van Sant's "slyness better than any of his work since Drugstore Cowboy." Roger Ebert of the Chicago Sun-Times gave the film 3½ out of 4 stars, writing that it was "merciless with its characters, and Kidman is superb at making Suzanne into someone who is not only stupid, vain and egomaniacal (we've seen that before) but also vulnerably human. She represents, on a large scale, feelings we have all had in smaller and sneakier ways."

Mick LaSalle of the San Francisco Chronicle said Kidman gave her character "layers of meaning, intention and impulse. Telling her story in close-up, [seeing] the calculation, the wheels turning, the transparent efforts to charm that succeed in charming all the same [...] her beauty and magnetism are electric. Undeniably she belongs on camera, which means it's equally undeniable that Suzanne belongs on camera. That in itself is an irony, a commentary, or both." Harlan Jacobson of TV Guide wrote the film "uses the tabloid-ready Pamela Smart murder case to mount an impudent, satirical attack on America's obsessive culture of celebrity." He thought Kidman played "ambition like a knife, and a will of pure steel", noting she was "an actress who can satirize herself." Jacobson praised Phoenix for making "a big impression just by standing still and registering hurt", and liked how Henry "constructed a screenplay whose architecture neatly incorporates human gargoyles [...] it's grotesque, and you hardly notice that it's built on the dark side of our fears and fantasies about women in the workplace."

The film's focus on the three teenagers, who are ensnared by Suzanne's plot, also received praise. The Los Angeles Times' Kenneth Turan wrote that Van Sant adds his "trademark absurdist sensibility to the mix as well as an empathy for inarticulate, inchoate teen-agers that turns out to give this film a good deal of its impact". Turan concluded: "The most accurate assault against the media age since Network, To Die For's killer lines and wicked sensibility are given added poignancy by the off-center, sensitive performance of Joaquin Phoenix, River's younger brother, the only person more deluded about Suzanne than she is about herself." Peter Travers of Rolling Stone wrote, "Folland and Affleck skillfully capture the pang of adolescence among no-hopers."

Katherine Ramsland of Crime Library discussed the film as a relatively rare example of media displaying women with Antisocial personality disorder, with Suzanne in particular described as a "manipulator extraordinaire" who harms people through third parties. The character of Suzanne Stone shows traits consistent with narcissistic personality disorder, according to an article in the scientific journal BMC Psychiatry.

Writing in 2007, Emanuel Levy stated, "mean-spirited satire, told in mock-tabloid style, this film features the best performance of Nicole Kidman to date (better than The Hours for which she won an Oscar), as an amoral small-town girl obsessed with becoming a TV star."

=== Box office ===
The film grossed $21 million in the United States and Canada and $41 million worldwide.

=== Accolades ===
Award	Date	Category	Recipient	Result	Ref.
American Comedy Awards	February 11, 1996	Funniest Actress in a Motion Picture (Leading Role)	Nicole Kidman	Nominated	
BAFTA Awards	April 23, 1996	Best Performance by an Actress in a Leading Role	Nicole Kidman	Nominated	
Boston Society of Film Critics Awards	December 17, 1995	Best Actress	Nicole Kidman	Won	
Chlotrudis Awards	1996	Best Actress	Nicole Kidman	Nominated	
Chlotrudis Awards	1996	Best Supporting Actor	Joaquin Phoenix	Nominated	
Chlotrudis Awards	1996	Best Supporting Actress	Illeana Douglas	Nominated	
Critics' Choice Awards	January 22, 1996	Best Actress	Nicole Kidman	Won	
Edgar Awards	1996	Best Motion Picture Screenplay	Buck Henry	Nominated	
Empire Awards	1996	Best Actress	Nicole Kidman	Won	
Golden Globe Awards	January 21, 1996	Best Actress in a Motion Picture - Comedy or Musical	Nicole Kidman	Won	
London Film Critics' Circle Awards	March 8, 1996	Actress of the Year	Nicole Kidman	Won	
National Society of Film Critics Awards	January 3, 1996	Best Supporting Actress	Illeana Douglas	3rd place	
New York Film Critics Circle Awards	January 7, 1996	Best Actress	Nicole Kidman	runner-up	
Saturn Awards	June 25, 1996	Best Actress	Nicole Kidman	Nominated	
Saturn Awards	June 25, 1996	Best Supporting Actress	Illeana Douglas	Nominated	
Seattle International Film Festival	May 18–June 11, 1995	Best Actress	Nicole Kidman	Won	
Southeastern Film Critics Association Awards	1996	Best Actress	Nicole Kidman	Won	
Southeastern Film Critics Association Awards	1996	Best Picture		9th place	

American Film Institute recognition:

- AFI's 100 Years...100 Heroes and Villains:
  - Suzanne Stone – Nominated Villain
- AFI's 100 Years...100 Laughs – Nominated

== Home media ==
To Die For was released on VHS following its theatrical release and on DVD on November 10, 1998. It was released on Blu-ray on November 8, 2011. A 4K remaster of the film was released by The Criterion Collection on Blu-ray and Ultra HD Blu-ray on March 26, 2024.
