= 1995 New York Film Critics Circle Awards =

61st New York Film Critics Circle Awards

61st New York Film Critics Circle Awards

January 7, 1996

Best Picture:
Leaving Las Vegas

The 61st New York Film Critics Circle Awards honored the best filmmaking of 1995. The winners were announced on 14 December 1995 and the awards were given on 7 January 1996.

== Winners ==
- Best Actor:
  - Nicolas Cage - Leaving Las Vegas
  - Runners-up: Anthony Hopkins - Nixon, Jeff Bridges - Wild Bill and John Travolta - Get Shorty
- Best Actress:
  - Jennifer Jason Leigh - Georgia
  - Runners-up: Elisabeth Shue - Leaving Las Vegas, Julianne Moore - Safe, Nicole Kidman - To Die For, Meryl Streep - The Bridges of Madison County and Emma Thompson - Sense and Sensibility
- Best Cinematography:
  - Lü Yue - Shanghai Triad
- Best Director:
  - Ang Lee - Sense and Sensibility
  - Runners-up: Mike Figgis - Leaving Las Vegas and Todd Haynes - Safe
- Best Documentary:
  - Crumb
- Best Film:
  - Leaving Las Vegas
  - Runners-up: Sense and Sensibility and Safe
- Best Foreign Language Film:
  - Wild Reeds (Les Roseaux sauvages) • France
  - Runners-up: Through the Olive Trees (Zire darakhatan zeyton) • Iran and Lamerica • Italy
- Best New Director:
  - Chris Noonan - Babe
  - Runners-up: Lodge Kerrigan - Clean, Shaven and Noah Baumbach - Kicking and Screaming
- Best Screenplay:
  - Emma Thompson - Sense and Sensibility
  - Runner-up: Amy Heckerling - Clueless
- Best Supporting Actor:
  - Kevin Spacey - Swimming with Sharks, The Usual Suspects, Outbreak and Seven
  - Runner-up: Don Cheadle - Devil in a Blue Dress
- Best Supporting Actress:
  - Mira Sorvino - Mighty Aphrodite
  - Runner-up: Joan Allen - Nixon
