= 1995 National Society of Film Critics Awards =

Annual US film awards ceremony

29th NSFC Awards

January 3, 1996

Best Film:
Babe

The 30th National Society of Film Critics Awards, given on 3 January 1996, honored the best filmmaking of 1995.

== Winners ==
=== Best Picture ===
1. Babe
2. Crumb
3. Safe

=== Best Director ===
1. Mike Figgis – Leaving Las Vegas
2. Todd Haynes – Safe
3. Walter Hill – Wild Bill

=== Best Actor ===
1. Nicolas Cage – Leaving Las Vegas
2. Sean Penn – Dead Man Walking
3. Jeff Bridges – Wild Bill
3. Morgan Freeman – Seven

=== Best Actress ===
1. Elisabeth Shue – Leaving Las Vegas
2. Jennifer Jason Leigh – Georgia
3. Meryl Streep – The Bridges of Madison County

=== Best Supporting Actor ===
1. Don Cheadle – Devil in a Blue Dress
2. Kevin Spacey – Seven, The Usual Suspects, Swimming with Sharks and Outbreak
3. Delroy Lindo – Clockers and Get Shorty

=== Best Supporting Actress ===
1. Joan Allen – Nixon
2. Mira Sorvino – Mighty Aphrodite
3. Illeana Douglas – To Die For

=== Best Screenplay ===
1. Amy Heckerling – Clueless
2. André Téchiné, Gilles Taurand and Olivier Massart – Wild Reeds (Les roseaux sauvages)
3. Todd Haynes – Safe

=== Best Cinematography ===
- Tak Fujimoto – Devil in a Blue Dress

=== Best Foreign Language Film ===
1. Wild Reeds (Les roseaux sauvages)
2. Lamerica
3. Through the Olive Trees (Zire darakhatan zeyton)

=== Best Documentary ===
- Crumb

=== Experimental Film ===
- Latcho Drom

=== Special Archival Prize ===
- I Am Cuba (Soy Cuba)
