= Erin O'Brien (writer) =

American novelist

- Born: 1965 (age 60–61)
- Occupations: Writer; blogger; managing director
- Known for: Freshwater Cleveland
- Notable work: Harvey and Eck, The Irish Hungarian Guide to the Domestic Arts

Erin O'Brien (born 1965) is an American fiction and nonfiction writer in the Cleveland area. From 2006 to 2010, she wrote the biweekly column "Rainy Day Woman," originally for the Cleveland Free Times and then the Cleveland Scene; her features and essays also have appeared in the Cleveland Plain Dealer, the New York Times, the Los Angeles Times, and elsewhere. Her first novel, Harvey and Eck, was published by Zumaya Publications in 2005. Her first book of nonfiction, titled The Irish Hungarian Guide to the Domestic Arts, was published by Red Giant Books in 2012.

She writes the blog "The Erin O'Brien Owner's Manual for Human Beings".

Erin O'Brien is the sister of writer John O'Brien, author of Leaving Las Vegas. His novel The Assault on Tony's (Grove Press, 1996), had been left unfinished at the time of his death and was completed by Erin for posthumous publication.

For five years, O'Brien was the editor of the Broadview Journal in Broadview Heights, Ohio, and she is the managing editor of the site Freshwater Cleveland.

She also writes under the name Erin Nowjack.
