= The Usual Suspects =

1995 film by Bryan Singer

- Theatrical release poster
- Directed by: Bryan Singer
- Written by: Christopher McQuarrie
- Produced by: Bryan Singer; Michael McDonnell
- Starring: Stephen Baldwin; Gabriel Byrne; Benicio del Toro; Chazz Palminteri; Kevin Pollak; Pete Postlethwaite; Kevin Spacey
- Cinematography: Newton Thomas Sigel
- Edited by: John Ottman
- Music by: John Ottman
- Production companies: PolyGram Filmed Entertainment; Bad Hat Harry Films; Blue Parrot Productions; Spelling Films International
- Distributed by: Gramercy Pictures (United States); Columbia TriStar Film Distributors International (Germany)
- Release dates: January 25, 1995 (Sundance); August 16, 1995 (United States)
- Running time: 106 minutes
- Countries: United States; Germany
- Language: English
- Budget: $6 million
- Box office: $67 million

The Usual Suspects is a 1995 crime thriller film directed by Bryan Singer and written by Christopher McQuarrie. It stars Kevin Spacey, Gabriel Byrne, Benicio del Toro, Stephen Baldwin, Kevin Pollak, Chazz Palminteri and Pete Postlethwaite.

The plot follows the interrogation of Roger "Verbal" Kint, a small-time con man, who is one of only two survivors of a massacre and fire on a ship docked at the Port of Los Angeles. Through flashback and narration, Kint tells an interrogator a convoluted story of events that led him and his criminal companions to the boat, and of a mysterious crime lord—known as Keyser Söze—who controlled them. The film was shot on a $6 million budget and began as a title taken from a column in Spy magazine called "The Usual Suspects", after one of Claude Rains' most memorable lines in the classic film Casablanca, and Singer thought that it would make a good title for a film.

The film was shown out of competition at the 1995 Cannes Film Festival, and then initially released in a few theaters. It received favorable reviews and was eventually given a wider release. Praise went towards the mystery elements, screenplay, plot twist, and Spacey's performance. McQuarrie won the Academy Award for Best Original Screenplay and Spacey won the Academy Award for Best Supporting Actor for his performance. In 2016, the Writers Guild of America ranked the film as having the 35th-greatest screenplay of all time.

== Plot ==
While lying badly wounded on a ship docked in San Pedro Bay, career criminal Dean Keaton is shot dead by a shadowy figure whom he calls "Keyser." The police recover 27 bodies and two survivors from the ship: Arkosh Kovash ("Ákos Kovács"), a Hungarian mobster hospitalized with severe burns; and Roger "Verbal" Kint, a physically disabled con artist. U.S. Customs agent Dave Kujan arrives in Los Angeles to interrogate Verbal in a borrowed office belonging to LAPD police sergeant Jeff Rabin. Meanwhile, FBI agent Jack Baer visits Kovács in hospital.

In an extended flashback, Verbal relates how he and Keaton, and their associates, arrived on the ship. Six weeks earlier, in New York, Keaton and Verbal were arrested and placed in a police lineup alongside fellow criminals Michael McManus, Fred Fenster and Todd Hockney. None of them admits to participating in the truck hijacking they're accused of and are returned to a holding cell, where McManus proposes a heist to get revenge on the NYPD. They rob a jewel smuggler being escorted by corrupt cops, netting millions in emeralds. Leaks to the press result in more than fifty policemen being arrested. The group travels to California to fence the jewels through a man named Redfoot, who connects them to another jewel heist. The heist goes badly, and they're forced to kill their target, who is carrying synthetic heroin.

The men learn the job was arranged by a lawyer named Kobayashi, who claims to be a representative of Keyser Söze—a mysterious Turkish crime lord. According to legend, Söze killed his own family while they were held hostage by his Hungarian rivals, then massacred his enemies. Söze subsequently vanished, conducting business from the shadows via underlings, most unaware they work for him. Law enforcement and the criminal underworld regards him as a fearsome urban legend, unsure if he even truly exists.

Kobayashi tells the men that they attracted Söze's attention by unwittingly stealing from him. He will spare their lives if they destroy a shipment of cocaine brought to San Pedro Bay by Argentinian drug dealers for sale to a Hungarian gang. After Fenster is killed attempting to flee, and the others fail to intimidate Kobayashi in his office, they agree to the job.

During Kujan's interrogation, he learns there was no cocaine on the ship, and Söze was seen on board. At the hospital, Baer learns that Kovács has seen Söze, and a sketch artist begins drawing him. At the conclusion of Verbal's flashback, he and his companions attack the ship and kill numerous gangsters before discovering there is no cocaine onboard. A mysterious figure kills Hockney, McManus, Keaton and a prisoner in one of the ship's cabins, then sets fire to the ship as Verbal looks on from the dock.

Kujan learns the prisoner killed on the ship was a smuggler who escaped prosecution by claiming he could identify Söze. Instead of cocaine, the Argentinians were planning to sell the smuggler to Söze's rivals. The smuggler's lawyer was Edie Finneran, Keaton's girlfriend, who was recently murdered. Armed with this information, Kujan deduces that Keaton was actually Keyser Söze: he organized the assault on the boat as a pretext for assassinating the smuggler and faking his death. Verbal confesses that Keaton was behind everything, but refuses to testify in court. Verbal's bail is posted, and he is released.

Moments later, Kujan realizes that Verbal fabricated his entire story, improvising on the spot by piecing together details from random items in Rabin's cluttered office. Verbal walks outside, loses his limp and flexes his supposedly disabled hand. As Kujan races outside in pursuit, a fax arrives at the police station with the sketch artist's facial composite of Söze, which reveals Verbal Kint is actually Keyser Söze. Seconds ahead of Kujan, Verbal gets in a car driven by "Kobayashi" and departs.

== Cast ==
- Kevin Spacey as Roger "Verbal" Kint/Keyser Söze:
  Singer and McQuarrie sent the screenplay for the film to Spacey without telling him which role was written for him. Spacey called Singer and told them that he was interested in the roles of Keaton and Kujan but was also intrigued by Kint who, as it turned out, was the role McQuarrie wrote with Spacey in mind.
- Gabriel Byrne as Dean Keaton:
  Kevin Spacey met Byrne at a party and asked him to do the film. He read the screenplay and turned it down, thinking that the filmmakers could not pull it off. Byrne met screenwriter Christopher McQuarrie and Singer and was impressed by the latter's vision for the film. However, Byrne was also dealing with some personal problems at the time and backed out for 24 hours until the filmmakers agreed to shoot the film in Los Angeles, where Byrne lived, and make it in five weeks.
- Chazz Palminteri as Agent Dave Kujan:
  Singer had always wanted Palminteri for the film, but he was always unavailable. The role was offered to Christopher Walken and Robert De Niro, both of whom turned it down. The filmmakers even had Al Pacino come in and read for the part, but he decided not to do it because he had just played a cop in Heat. Pacino would later say it was the one film he has most regretted turning down. Palminteri became available, but only for a week. When he signed on, this persuaded the film's financial backers to support the film fully because he was a sufficiently high-profile star, thanks to the recent releases of A Bronx Tale and Bullets Over Broadway.
- Stephen Baldwin as McManus:
  Baldwin was tired of doing independent films where his expectations were not met; when he met with director Bryan Singer, he went into a 15-minute tirade telling him what it was like to work with him. After Baldwin was finished, Singer told him exactly what he expected and wanted, which impressed Baldwin.
- Benicio del Toro as Fenster:
  Spacey suggested del Toro for the role. The character was originally written with a Harry Dean Stanton-type actor in mind. Del Toro met with Singer and the film's casting director and told them that he did not want to audition because he did not feel comfortable doing them. After reading the script, del Toro realized that his character's only purpose was to be killed to demonstrate Söze's power, and did not have any meaningful impact on the story. As a result, del Toro developed Fenster's unique, garbled speech pattern to make him more memorable as a character.
- Kevin Pollak as Todd Hockney:
  He met with Singer about doing the film, but when he heard that two other actors were auditioning for the role, he came back, auditioned, and got the part.
- Pete Postlethwaite as Kobayashi
- Suzy Amis as Edie Finneran, Keaton's attorney and girlfriend
- Giancarlo Esposito as FBI Agent Jack Baer
- Dan Hedaya as Sergeant Jeff Rabin
- Cástulo Guerra as Arturo Marquez
- Morgan Hunter as Ákos Kovács
- Ron Gilbert as Daniel Metzheiser
- Peter Greene as Redfoot (uncredited)
- Scott B. Morgan as Keyser Söze (in flashbacks) (uncredited)

== Production ==
=== Origins ===
Bryan Singer met Kevin Spacey at a party after a screening of Singer's first film, Public Access, at the 1993 Sundance Film Festival, where it won the Grand Jury Prize. Spacey had been encouraged by a number of people he knew who had seen it, and was so impressed that he told Singer and his screenwriting partner Christopher McQuarrie, that he wanted to be in whatever film they did next. Singer read a column in Spy magazine called "The Usual Suspects" after Claude Rains' line in Casablanca. Singer thought that it would be a good title for a film. When asked by a reporter at Sundance what their next film was about, McQuarrie replied, "I guess it's about a bunch of criminals who meet in a police line-up," which incidentally was the first visual idea that he and Singer had for the poster: "five guys who meet in a line-up," Singer remembers. Singer also envisioned a tagline for the poster, "All of you can go to Hell." Singer then asked the question, "What would possibly bring these five felons together in one line-up?" McQuarrie revamped an idea from one of his own unpublished screenplays – the story of a man who murders his own family and disappears. The writer mixed this with the idea of a team of criminals.

Söze's character is based on John List, a New Jersey accountant who murdered his family in 1971 and then disappeared for almost two decades, assuming a new identity before he was ultimately apprehended. McQuarrie based the name of Keyser Söze on one of his previous supervisors, Kayser Sume, at a Los Angeles law firm where he worked, but decided to change the last name because he thought that his former boss would object to how it was used. He found the word söze in his roommate's English-to-Turkish dictionary, which translates as "talk too much". All the characters' names are taken from staff members of the law firm at the time of his employment. McQuarrie had also worked for a detective agency, and this influenced the depiction of criminals and law enforcement officials in the script.

Singer described the film as Double Indemnity meets Rashomon, and said that it was made "so you can go back and see all sorts of things you didn't realize were there the first time. You can get it a second time in a way you never could have the first time around." He also compared the film's structure to Citizen Kane (which also contained an interrogator and a subject who is telling a story) and the criminal caper The Anderson Tapes.

=== Pre-production ===
McQuarrie wrote nine drafts of his screenplay over five months, until Singer felt that it was ready to shop around to the studios. None were interested except for a European financing company. McQuarrie and Singer had a difficult time getting the film made because of the non-linear story, the large amount of dialogue and the lack of cast attached to the project. Financiers wanted established stars, and offers for the role of Agent Dave Kujan went out to Christopher Walken, Tommy Lee Jones, Jeff Bridges, Charlie Sheen, James Spader, Al Pacino and Johnny Cash. However, the European money allowed the film's producers to make offers to actors and assemble a cast. They were able to offer the actors only salaries that were well below their usual pay, but they agreed because of the quality of McQuarrie's script and the chance to work with one another. That money fell through, and Singer used the script and the cast to attract PolyGram to pick up the film negative.

About casting, Singer said, "You pick people not for what they are, but what you imagine they can turn into." To research his role, Spacey met doctors and experts on cerebral palsy and talked with Singer about how it would fit dramatically in the film. They decided that it would affect only one side of his body. According to Byrne, the cast bonded quickly during rehearsals. Del Toro worked with Alan Shaterian to develop Fenster's distinctive, almost unintelligible speech patterns. According to the actor, the source of his character's unusual speech patterns came from the realization that "the purpose of my character was to die." Del Toro told Singer, "It really doesn't matter what I say, so I can go really far out with this and really make it uncomprehensible."

=== Filming ===
The budget was set at $5.5 million, and the film was shot in 35 days in Los Angeles, San Pedro, and New York City in 1994. Spacey said that they shot the interrogation scenes with Palminteri over a span of five to six days. These scenes were also shot before the rest of the film. The police lineup scene ran into scheduling conflicts because the actors kept blowing their lines. Screenwriter Christopher McQuarrie would feed the actors questions off-camera and they improvised their lines. When Stephen Baldwin gave his answer, he made the other actors break character. Byrne remembers that they were often laughing between takes and "when they said, 'Action!', we'd barely be able to keep it together." Spacey also said that the hardest part was not laughing through takes, with Baldwin and Pollak being the worst culprits. Their goal was to get the usually serious Byrne to crack up. They spent all morning trying unsuccessfully to film the scene. At lunch, a frustrated Singer angrily scolded the five actors, but, when they resumed, the cast continued to laugh through each take. Byrne remembers, "Finally, Bryan just used one of the takes where we couldn't stay serious." Singer and editor John Ottman used a combination of takes and kept the humor in to show the characters bonding with one another.

While Del Toro told Singer how he was going to portray Fenster, he did not tell his cast members, and in their first scene together none of them understood what Del Toro was saying. Byrne confronted Singer and the director told him that for the lockup scene, "If you don't understand what he's saying maybe it's time we let the audience know that they don't need to know what he's saying." This led to the inclusion of Kevin Pollak's improvised line, "What did you say?"

The stolen emeralds were real gemstones on loan for the film.

Singer spent an 18-hour day shooting the underground parking garage robbery. According to Byrne, by the next day Singer still did not have all of the footage that he wanted, and refused to stop filming in spite of the bonding company's threat to shut down the production.

In the scene in which the crew meets Redfoot after the botched drug deal, Redfoot flicks his cigarette at McManus' face. The scene was originally to have Redfoot flick the cigarette at McManus's chest, but the actor missed and hit Baldwin's face by accident. Baldwin's reaction is genuine.

Despite enclosed practical locations and a short shooting schedule, cinematographer Newton Thomas Sigel "developed a way of shooting dialogue scenes with a combination of slow, creeping zooms and dolly moves that ended in tight close-ups," to add subtle energy to scenes. "This style combined dolly movement with "imperceptible zooms" so that you'd always have a sense of motion in a limited space."

In December 2017, amid several sexual misconduct allegations against Spacey, Byrne said that, at one point during shooting, production was shut down for two days because Spacey made unwanted sexual advances toward a younger actor. Singer, who has himself been accused of sexual misconduct against minors, has denied that Spacey behaved inappropriately on the set of the film. However, Kevin Pollak, in a 2018 episode of his podcast Kevin Pollak's Chat Show, told another version of the story involving Spacey engaging in sexual acts with Singer's young French boyfriend with only several days left in the production, which disrupted filming and led to a bitter ruination of their relationship.

=== Post-production ===
During the editing phase, Singer thought that they had completed the film two weeks early, but woke up one morning and realized that they needed that time to put together a sequence that convinced the audience that Dean Keaton was Söze—and then do the same for Verbal Kint because the film did not have "the punch that Chris had written so beautifully." According to Ottman, he assembled the footage as a montage but it still did not work until he added an overlapping voice-over montage featuring key dialogue from several characters and had it relate to the images. Early on, executives at Gramercy had problems pronouncing the name Keyser Söze and were worried that audiences would have the same problem. The studio decided to promote the character's name. Two weeks before the film debuted in theaters, "Who is Keyser Söze?" posters appeared at bus stops, and TV spots told people how to say the character's name.

Singer wanted the music for the boat heist to resemble Tchaikovsky's Piano Concerto No. 1. The ending's music was based on a k.d. lang song.

== Release ==
Gramercy ran a pre-release promotion and advertising campaign before The Usual Suspects opened in the summer of 1995. Word of mouth marketing was used to advertise the film, and buses and billboards were plastered with the simple question, "Who is Keyser Söze?"

The film was shown out of competition at the 1995 Cannes Film Festival and was well received by audiences and critics. The film was then given an exclusive run in Los Angeles, where it took a combined $83,513, and New York City, where it made $132,294 on three screens in its opening weekend. The film was then released in 42 theaters where it earned $645,363 on its opening weekend. It averaged a strong $4,181 per screen at 517 theaters and the following week added 300 locations. It eventually made $23.3 million in the United States and Canada. It grossed $43.6 million internationally for a worldwide total of $66.9 million.

== Reception ==
=== Critical response ===
On Rotten Tomatoes, The Usual Suspects has received a rating of 87%, based on 83 reviews, with an average rating of 7.80/10. The site's consensus reads, "Expertly shot and edited, The Usual Suspects gives the audience a simple plot and then piles on layers of deceit, twists, and violence before pulling out the rug from underneath." On Metacritic, the film has a score of 76 out of 100, based on 22 reviews, indicating "generally favorable reviews".

Roger Ebert, in a review for the Chicago Sun-Times, gave the film one-and-a-half stars out of four, writing that it was confusing and uninteresting: "To the degree that I do understand, I don't care." He also included the film in his "most hated films" list. USA Today rated the film two-and-a-half stars out of four, calling it "one of the most densely plotted mysteries in memory—though paradoxically, four-fifths of it is way too easy to predict."

Rolling Stone praised Spacey, saying his "balls-out brilliant performance is Oscar bait all the way." In his review for The Washington Post, Hal Hinson wrote:

Ultimately, The Usual Suspects may be too clever for its own good. The twist at the end is a corker, but crucial questions remain unanswered. What's interesting, though, is how little this intrudes on our enjoyment. After the movie you're still trying to connect the dots and make it all fit—and these days, how often can we say that?

In her review for The New York Times, Janet Maslin praised the performances of the cast:

Mr. Singer has assembled a fine ensemble cast of actors who can parry such lines, and whose performances mesh effortlessly despite their exaggerated differences in demeanor ... Without the violence or obvious bravado of Reservoir Dogs, these performers still create strong and fascinatingly ambiguous characters.

The Independent praised the film's ending: "The film's coup de grace is as elegant as it is unexpected. The whole movie plays back in your mind in perfect clarity—and turns out to be a completely different movie to the one you've been watching (rather better, in fact)."

=== Accolades ===
At the 68th Academy Awards, Kevin Spacey won the Academy Award for Best Supporting Actor and Christopher McQuarrie won the Academy Award for Best Original Screenplay. In his acceptance speech, Spacey said, "Well, whoever Keyser Söze is, I can tell you he's gonna get gloriously drunk tonight."

Award	Category	Nominee(s)	Result	Ref.
Academy Awards	Best Supporting Actor	Kevin Spacey	Won	
Academy Awards	Best Screenplay – Written Directly for the Screen	Christopher McQuarrie	Won	
American Cinema Editors Awards	Best Edited Feature Film	John Ottman	Nominated	
Artios Awards	Outstanding Achievement in Feature Film Casting – Drama	Francine Maisler	Won	
Boston Society of Film Critics Awards	Best Supporting Actor	Kevin Spacey	Won	
British Academy Film Awards	Best Film	Bryan Singer and Michael McDonnell	Nominated	
British Academy Film Awards	Best Original Screenplay	Christopher McQuarrie	Won	
British Academy Film Awards	Best Editing	John Ottman	Won	
Chicago Film Critics Association Awards	Best Supporting Actor	Kevin Spacey	Won	
Chicago Film Critics Association Awards	Best Screenplay	Christopher McQuarrie	Won	
Chicago Film Critics Association Awards	Most Promising Actor	Benicio del Toro	Nominated	
Chlotrudis Awards	Best Supporting Actor	Kevin Spacey	Won	
César Awards	Best Foreign Film		Nominated	
Critics' Choice Awards	Best Supporting Actor	Kevin Spacey	Won (Note: Tied with Ed Harris for Apollo 13, Just Cause and Nixon)	
Dallas-Fort Worth Film Critics Association Awards	Best Picture		Nominated	
Dallas-Fort Worth Film Critics Association Awards	Best Supporting Actor	Kevin Spacey	Won	
Edgar Allan Poe Awards	Best Motion Picture	Christopher McQuarrie	Won	
Empire Awards	Best Debut	Bryan Singer	Won	
Golden Globe Awards	Best Supporting Actor – Motion Picture	Kevin Spacey	Nominated	
Independent Spirit Awards	Best Supporting Male	Benicio del Toro	Won	
Independent Spirit Awards	Best Screenplay	Christopher McQuarrie	Won	
Independent Spirit Awards	Best Cinematography	Newton Thomas Sigel	Nominated	
Kinema Junpo Awards	Best Foreign Language Film	Bryan Singer	Won	
Los Angeles Film Critics Association Awards	Best Supporting Actor	Kevin Spacey	Runner-up	
National Board of Review Awards	Top 10 Films		10th Place	
National Board of Review Awards	Best Supporting Actor	Kevin Spacey	Won	
National Board of Review Awards	Best Acting by an Ensemble		Won	
National Society of Film Critics Awards	Best Supporting Actor	Kevin Spacey	Runner-up	
New York Film Critics Circle Awards	Best Supporting Actor	Kevin Spacey	Won	
Online Film & Television Association Awards	Best Motion Picture		Won	
Sant Jordi Awards	Best Foreign Actor	Chazz Palminteri	Won	
Sarajevo Film Festival	Audience Award for Best Feature Film	Bryan Singer	Won	
Saturn Awards	Best Action/Adventure Film		Won	
Saturn Awards	Best Director	Bryan Singer	Nominated	
Saturn Awards	Best Music	John Ottman	Won	
Screen Actors Guild Awards	Outstanding Performance by a Male Actor in a Supporting Role	Kevin Spacey	Nominated	
Seattle International Film Festival	Best Director	Bryan Singer	Won	
Seattle International Film Festival	Best Actor	Kevin Spacey	Won	
Society of Texas Film Critics Awards	Best Film		Won	
Society of Texas Film Critics Awards	Best Director	Bryan Singer	Won	
Society of Texas Film Critics Awards	Best Supporting Actor	Kevin Spacey	Won	
Society of Texas Film Critics Awards	Best Original Screenplay	Christopher McQuarrie	Won	
Southeastern Film Critics Association Awards	Best Picture		8th Place	
Tokyo International Film Festival	Silver Award	Bryan Singer	Won	
Turkish Film Critics Association Awards	Best Foreign Film		2nd Place	

=== Legacy ===
On June 17, 2008, the American Film Institute revealed its "AFI's 10 Top 10"—the best ten films in ten "classic" American film genres—after polling over 1,500 people from the creative community. The Usual Suspects was acknowledged as the tenth-best mystery film. Verbal Kint was voted the #48 villain in "AFI's 100 Years...100 Heroes & Villains" in June 2003.

Entertainment Weekly cited the film as one of the "13 must-see heist movies". Empire ranked Keyser Söze #69 in their "The 100 Greatest Movie Characters" poll. In August 2016, James Charisma of Paste ranked The Usual Suspects among Kevin Spacey's greatest film performances.

In 2006, the Writers Guild of America ranked the screenplay #35 on its list of 101 Greatest Screenplays ever written.

In 2016, the Directors Guild of America ranked the film 77th on its list of The 80 Best-Directed Films since the Guild’s founding in 1936.

== See also ==
- Heist film
- Tarantinoesque film
- List of cult films
- Project Gutenberg (film) – 2018 Hong Kong-Chinese film by Felix Chong
