= Dallas–Fort Worth Film Critics Association Awards 1995 =

1995 award cemony in Dallas, TX

2nd Dallas-Fort Worth Film Critics Association Awards
- Date: January 1996
- Location: Dallas, Texas
- Country: United States
- Presented by: Dallas-Fort Worth Film Critics Association
- Website: dfwfilmcritics.net

The 2nd Dallas-Fort Worth Film Critics Association Awards, given in 1996, honored the best filmmaking of 1995.

== Winners ==
- Best Actor:
  - Nicolas Cage and Elisabeth Shue - Leaving Las Vegas
- Best Director:
  - Mike Figgis - Leaving Las Vegas
- Best Foreign Language Film:
  - Les Misérables
- Best Picture:
  - Leaving Las Vegas
- Best Supporting Actor:
  - Kevin Spacey - The Usual Suspects
- Best Supporting Actress:
  - Mira Sorvino - Mighty Aphrodite
- Worst Film:
  - Showgirls
