= Leaving Las Vegas (novel) =

1990 novel by John O'Brien

- Cover of the first U.S. edition
- Author: John O'Brien
- Language: English
- Publisher: Watermark Press
- Publication date: 1990
- Publication place: United States
- Media type: Print
- Pages: 189
- ISBN: 0-922820-12-0

Leaving Las Vegas is a semi-autobiographical 1990 novel by John O'Brien. The novel was adapted into a 1995 film of the same name, starring Nicolas Cage and Elisabeth Shue. The film was nominated for four Academy Awards, winning Cage the Academy Award for Best Actor, and earning Shue a nomination for the Academy Award for Best Actress and screenwriter/director Mike Figgis nominations for the Academy Award for Best Director and the Academy Award for Best Adapted Screenplay.

O'Brien died of a self-inflicted gunshot wound within weeks of signing away the film rights to the novel.
