= 1995 Los Angeles Film Critics Association Awards =

Annual US film awards ceremony

21st LAFCA Awards
- Date: December 16, 1995

Highlights
- Best Picture: Leaving Las Vegas

The 21st Los Angeles Film Critics Association Awards, honoring the best in film for 1995, were announced on 16 December 1995 and given on 15 January 1996.

== Winners ==
- Best Picture:
  - Leaving Las Vegas
  - Runner-up: A Little Princess
- Best Director:
  - Mike Figgis – Leaving Las Vegas
  - Runner-up: Ang Lee – Sense and Sensibility
- Best Actor:
  - Nicolas Cage – Leaving Las Vegas
  - Runner-up: Anthony Hopkins – Nixon
- Best Actress:
  - Elisabeth Shue – Leaving Las Vegas
  - Runner-up: Jennifer Jason Leigh – Georgia
- Best Supporting Actor:
  - Don Cheadle – Devil in a Blue Dress
  - Runner-up: Kevin Spacey – Outbreak, Seven, Swimming with Sharks and The Usual Suspects
- Best Supporting Actress:
  - Joan Allen – Nixon
  - Runner-up: Mira Sorvino – Mighty Aphrodite
- Best Screenplay:
  - Emma Thompson – Sense and Sensibility
  - Runner-up: Mike Figgis – Leaving Las Vegas
- Best Cinematography:
  - Lü Yue – Shanghai Triad
  - Runner-up: Darius Khondji – Seven
- Best Production Design:
  - Bo Welch - A Little Princess
  - Runner-up: Gary Frutkoff – Devil in a Blue Dress
- Best Music Score:
  - Patrick Doyle – A Little Princess
  - Runner-up: Howard Shore – Seven
- Best Foreign-Language Film:
  - Wild Reeds (Les roseaux sauvages) • France
  - Runner-up: The Postman (Il postino) • Italy/France/Belgium
- Best Non-Fiction Film:
  - Crumb
  - Runner-up: Theremin: An Electronic Odyssey
- Best Animation:
  - Toy Story
- The Douglas Edwards Experimental/Independent Film/Video Award:
  - Mark Rappaport – From the Journals of Jean Seberg
- New Generation Award:
  - Alfonso Cuarón – A Little Princess
- Career Achievement Award:
  - André de Toth
