= National Board of Review Awards 1995 =

Annual US film awards ceremony

67th National Board of Review Awards

Best Picture:
Sense and Sensibility

The 67th National Board of Review Awards, honoring the best in filmmaking in 1995, were announced on 13 December 1995 and given on 26 February 1996.

== Top 10 films ==
1. Sense and Sensibility
2. Apollo 13
3. Carrington
4. Leaving Las Vegas
5. The American President
6. Mighty Aphrodite
7. Smoke
8. Persuasion
9. Braveheart
10. The Usual Suspects

== Top Foreign films ==
1. Farinelli
2. Lamerica
3. Les Misérables
4. Il Postino: The Postman
5. Shanghai Triad

== Winners ==
- Best Actor:
  - Nicolas Cage – Leaving Las Vegas
- Best Actress:
  - Emma Thompson – Sense and Sensibility and Carrington
- Best Cast:
  - The Usual Suspects
- Best Director:
  - Ang Lee – Sense and Sensibility
- Best Documentary Feature:
  - Crumb
- Best Film:
  - Sense and Sensibility
- Best Foreign Film:
  - Shanghai Triad
- Best Screenplay:
  - Betty Comden and Adolph Green
- Best Supporting Actor:
  - Kevin Spacey – The Usual Suspects, Se7en
- Best Supporting Actress:
  - Mira Sorvino – Mighty Aphrodite
- Breakthrough Performance:
  - Alicia Silverstone – Clueless
- Best TV Film:
  - The Boys of St. Vincent
- Distinction in Screenwriting:
  - Betty Comden, Adolph Green
- Special Filmmaking Achievement:
  - Mel Gibson – Braveheart
- Freedom of Expression Award:
  - Zhang Yimou
- Billy Wilder Award:
  - Stanley Donen
- Career Achievement Award:
  - James Earl Jones
