= 11th Independent Spirit Awards =

US film awards ceremony in 1996

- Date: March 23, 1996
- Site: Santa Monica, California, U.S.
- Hosted by: Samuel L. Jackson

Highlights
- Best Film: Leaving Las Vegas
- Most awards: Leaving Las Vegas (4)
- Most nominations: Leaving Las Vegas (7)

The 11th Independent Spirit Awards, honoring the best in independent filmmaking for 1995, were announced on March 23, 1996. It was hosted by Samuel L. Jackson.

== Nominees and winners ==
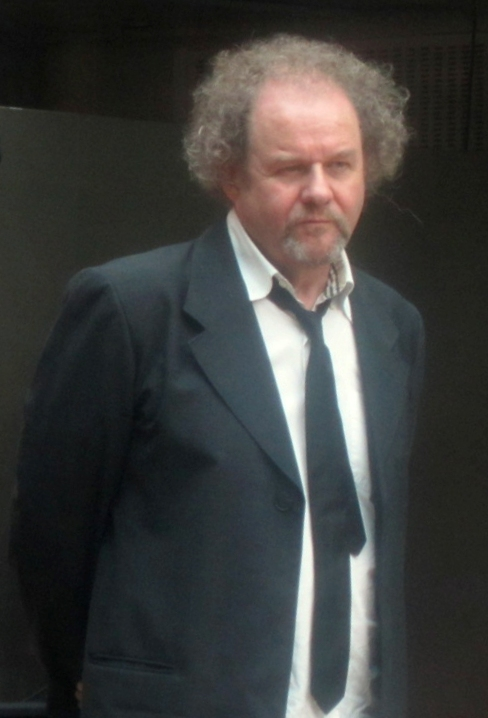
Mike Figgis, winner of Best Director

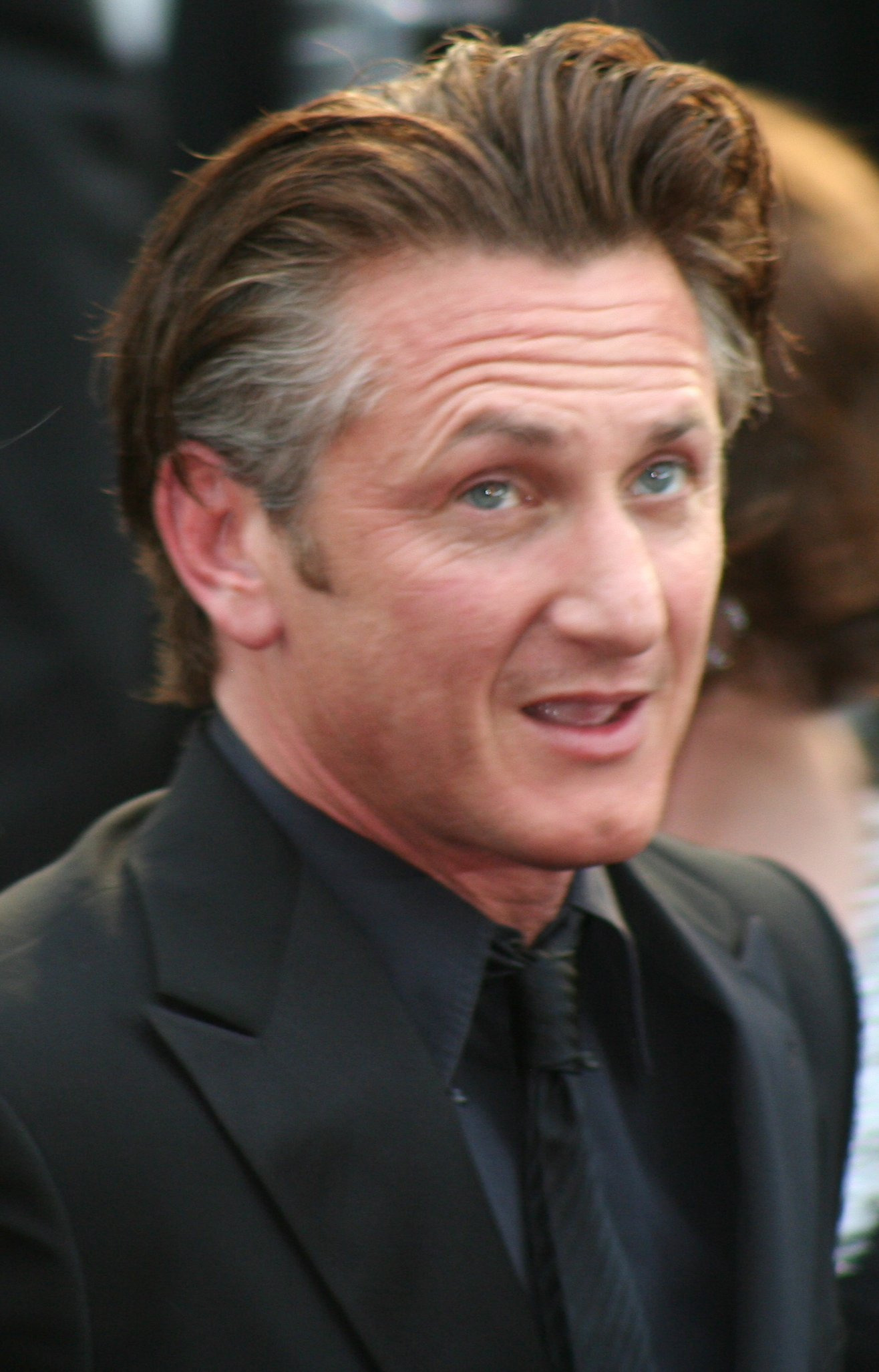
Sean Penn, winner of Best Male Lead

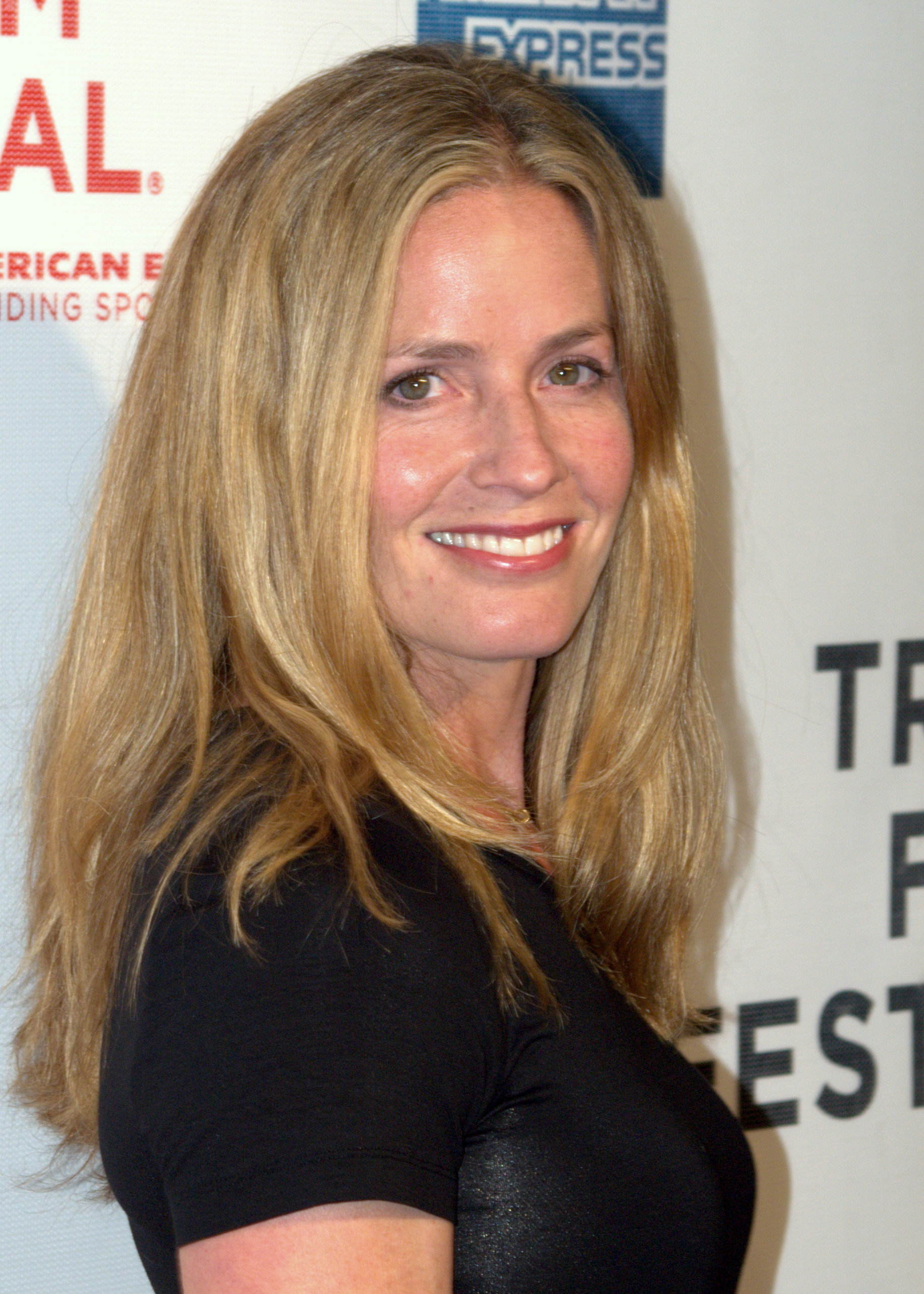
Elisabeth Shue, winner of Best Female Lead

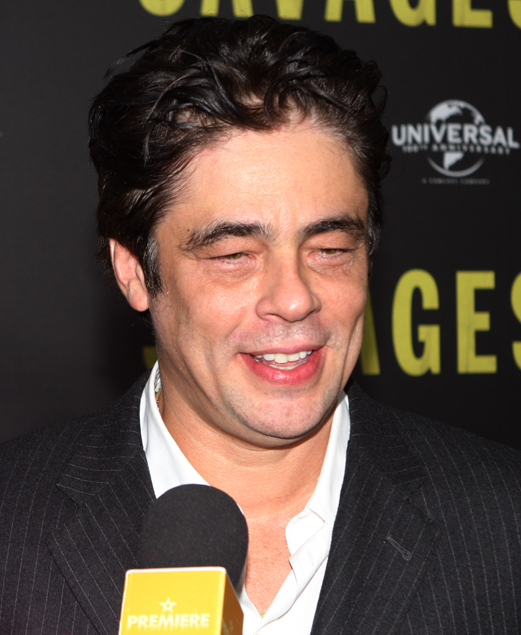
Benicio del Toro, winner of Best Supporting Male

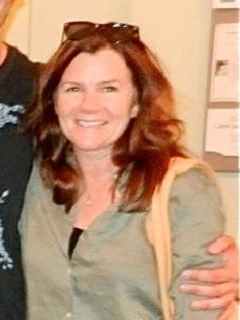
Mare Winningham, winner of Best Supporting Female

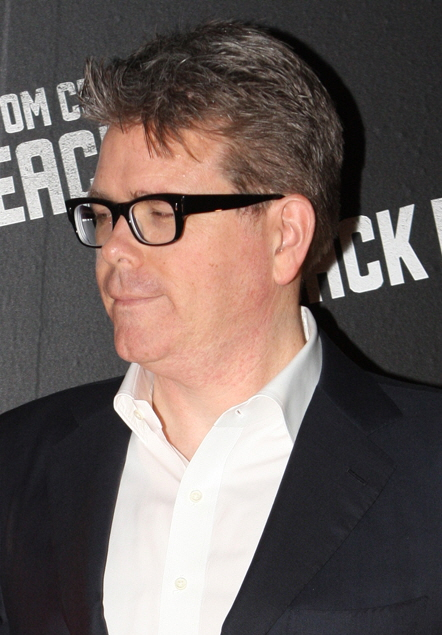
Christopher McQuarrie, winner of Best Screenplay

Best Feature	Best Director
Leaving Las Vegas: The Addiction; Living in Oblivion; Safe; The Secret of Roan Inish	Mike Figgis – Leaving Las Vegas: Michael Almereyda – Nadja; Ulu Grosbard – Georgia; Todd Haynes – Safe; John Sayles – The Secret of Roan Inish
Best Male Lead	Best Female Lead
Sean Penn – Dead Man Walking: Nicolas Cage – Leaving Las Vegas; Tim Roth – Little Odessa; Jimmy Smits – My Family; Kevin Spacey – Swimming with Sharks	Elisabeth Shue – Leaving Las Vegas: Jennifer Jason Leigh – Georgia; Elina Löwensohn – Nadja; Julianne Moore – Safe; Lili Taylor – The Addiction
Best Supporting Male	Best Supporting Female
Benicio del Toro – The Usual Suspects: James LeGros – Living in Oblivion; David Morse – The Crossing Guard; Max Perlich – Georgia; Harold Perrineau – Smoke	Mare Winningham – Georgia: Jennifer Lopez – My Family; Vanessa Redgrave – Little Odessa; Chloë Sevigny – Kids; Celia Weston – Dead Man Walking
Best Screenplay	Best First Screenplay
The Usual Suspects – Christopher McQuarrie: Leaving Las Vegas – Mike Figgis; Living in Oblivion – Tom DiCillo; Safe – Todd Haynes; The Secret of Roan Inish – John Sayles	Smoke – Paul Auster: Kids – Harmony Korine; Little Odessa – James Gray; Post Cards from America – Steve McLean; River of Grass – Kelly Reichardt
Best First Feature	Best Debut Performance
The Brothers McMullen - Edward Burns: Kids - Larry Clark; Little Odessa - James Gray; Picture Bride; River of Grass - Kelly Reichardt	Justin Pierce – Kids: Jason Andrews – Rhythm Thief; Lisa Bowman – River of Grass; Gabriel Casseus – New Jersey Drive; Rose McGowan – The Doom Generation
Best Cinematography	Best Foreign Film
Leaving Las Vegas – Declan Quinn: Little Odessa – Tom Richmond; Nadja – Jim Denault; The Underneath – Elliot Davis; The Usual Suspects – Newton Thomas Sigel	Before the Rain • Macedonia: The City of Lost Children • France; Exotica • Canada; I Am Cuba • Soviet Union; Through the Olive Trees • Iran

=== Films that received multiple nominations ===
Nominations	Film
7	Leaving Las Vegas
5	Little Odessa
4	Georgia
4	Kids
4	River of Grass
4	Safe
4	The Secret of Roan Irish
3	Living in Oblivion
3	Nadja
3	The Usual Suspects
2	The Addiction
2	Dead Man Walking
2	My Family
2	Smoke

==== Films that won multiple awards ====
Awards	Film
4	Leaving Las Vegas
2	The Usual Suspects

== Special awards ==
=== Someone to Watch Award ===
Christopher Münch – Color of a Brisk and Leaping Day

- Tim McCann – Desolation Angels
- Jennifer Montgomery – Art for Teachers of Children
- Kelly Reichardt – River of Grass
- Rafal Zielinski – Fun

=== Special Distinction Award ===
- Samuel Fuller
