= Boston Society of Film Critics Awards 1995 =

Annual US film awards ceremony

16th BSFC Awards

December 17, 1995

Best Film:
Sense and Sensibility

The 16th Boston Society of Film Critics Awards honored the best filmmaking of 1995. The awards were given on 17 December 1995

== Winners ==
- Best Film:
  - Sense and Sensibility
- Best Actor:
  - Nicolas Cage – Leaving Las Vegas
- Best Actress:
  - Nicole Kidman – To Die For
- Best Supporting Actor:
  - Kevin Spacey – The Usual Suspects
- Best Supporting Actress:
  - Joan Allen – Nixon
- Best Director:
  - Ang Lee – Sense and Sensibility
- Best Screenplay:
  - Emma Thompson – Sense and Sensibility
- Best Cinematography:
  - Alex Nepomniaschy – Safe
- Best Documentary:
  - Crumb
- Best Foreign-Language Film:
  - Mina Tannenbaum • Netherlands/France/Belgium
