= Leaving Las Vegas =

1995 film by Mike Figgis

- Theatrical release poster
- Directed by: Mike Figgis
- Screenplay by: Mike Figgis
- Based on: Leaving Las Vegas by John O'Brien
- Produced by: Lila Cazès; Annie Stewart
- Starring: Nicolas Cage; Elisabeth Shue; Julian Sands
- Cinematography: Declan Quinn
- Edited by: John Smith
- Music by: Anthony Marinelli; Mike Figgis
- Production companies: United Artists; Lumiére Pictures
- Distributed by: MGM/UA Distribution Co. (United States); AFMD (France); Entertainment Film Distributors (United Kingdom and Ireland); Lumiére Pictures (Overseas)
- Release dates: September 15, 1995 (TIFF); October 27, 1995 (United States); January 19, 1996 (United Kingdom); February 9, 1996 (United States); March 20, 1996 (France)
- Running time: 111 minutes
- Countries: United States; France; United Kingdom
- Language: English
- Budget: $3.5–4 million
- Box office: $49.8 million

Leaving Las Vegas is a 1995 romantic drama film written and directed by Mike Figgis and based on the 1990 semi-autobiographical novel by John O'Brien. Nicolas Cage stars as a suicidal alcoholic in Los Angeles who, having lost his family and been recently fired, has decided to move to Las Vegas and drink himself to death. Once there, he develops a romantic relationship with a prostitute (Elisabeth Shue).

Leaving Las Vegas was filmed in super 16 mm instead of 35 mm film; while 16 mm was common for art house films at the time, 35 mm is most commonly used for mainstream film. After limited release in the United States on October 27, 1995, Leaving Las Vegas was released nationwide on February 9, 1996, receiving strong praise from critics and audiences with many lauding the performances from Cage and Shue, the tone, the themes and Figgis's direction and screenplay. Cage received the Golden Globe Award for Best Actor - Motion Picture Drama and the Academy Award for Best Actor, while Shue was nominated for the Golden Globe Award for Best Actress - Motion Picture Drama and the Academy Award for Best Actress. The film also received Oscar nominations for Best Adapted Screenplay and Best Director.

== Plot ==
Ben Sanderson is an alcoholic Hollywood screenwriter who has lost his job, family, and friends. With nothing left to live for, and with a sizable severance check from his boss, he heads to Las Vegas where he plans on drinking himself to death. One early morning, he drives drunkenly from his Los Angeles home down to the Las Vegas Strip; he nearly hits a woman, Sera, on the crosswalk. She chastises him and walks away.

Sera is a prostitute working for abusive Latvian pimp Yuri Butsov. Russian mobsters are after Yuri, so he ends his relationship with Sera for fear that the Russians might otherwise hurt her.

On his second day in Las Vegas, Ben contacts Sera. He introduces himself and offers her $500 to spend an hour in his room with him. Sera agrees, but Ben does not want sex. Instead, they talk and develop a rapport; Sera invites Ben to move into her apartment. Ben makes Sera promise to never ask that he stop drinking; in return, Ben promises never to criticize her occupation. She thanks him and agrees to his terms.

At first, the pair are happy; yet each soon becomes frustrated with the other's behavior. Sera pleads with Ben to consult a rehab clinic, but all her advice is wasted on him. While Sera is working, Ben goes to a casino and returns with another prostitute. Sera returns home to find them in her bed, and throws Ben out. Shortly afterward, Sera is approached by three college students at the Excalibur Hotel and Casino. She initially rejects them, proclaiming that she "dates" just one customer at a time. Eventually, however, Sera acquiesces when offered an increased price. After she arrives at the students' hotel room, the trio changes their deal by demanding anal sex. When she refuses and attempts to leave, all three violently gang-rape her.

The following day, Sera's landlady sees her bruised. She tells Sera to leave by the end of the week. Sera receives a call from Ben, who is on his deathbed. She visits Ben, and the two have sex; he dies shortly thereafter. Later, Sera tells her therapist that she accepted Ben for who he was, and that she loved him.

== Cast ==
- Nicolas Cage as Ben Sanderson
- Elisabeth Shue as Sera
- Julian Sands as Yuri Butsov
- Richard Lewis as Peter
- Steven Weber as Marc Nussbaum
- Emily Procter as Debbie
- Valeria Golino as Terri
- Thomas Kopache as Mr. Simpson
- Laurie Metcalf as Mrs. Van Houten
- French Stewart as Business Man #2
- R. Lee Ermey as Conventioneer
- Mariska Hargitay as Hooker at Bar
- Julian Lennon as Bartender #3 in Biker Bar
- Graham Beckel as L.A. Bartender
- Albert Henderson as Man at Strip Bar
- Carey Lowell as Bank Teller
- Vincent Ward as Businessman #1
- Lucinda Jenney as Weird Woman
- Ed Lauter as Mobster #3
- Mike Figgis as Mobster #1
- Danny Huston as Bartender #2
- Shawnee Smith as Biker Girl
- Bob Rafelson as Man at Mall
- Marc Coppola as Dealer
- Michael Goorjian as College Boy #1 (as Michael A. Goorjian)
- Jeremy Jordan as College Boy #2
- Xander Berkeley as Cynical Cabbie
- Lou Rawls as Concerned Cabbie

== Production ==
=== Development ===
Mike Figgis based Leaving Las Vegas on a 1990 autobiographical novel by John O'Brien, who died by suicide in April 1994, shortly after finding out his novel was being used as the basis for a film. Despite basing most of his screenplay on O'Brien's novel, Figgis spoke of a personal attachment to the novel, stating "Anything I would do would be because I had a sympathetic feeling towards it. That's why I did Mr. Jones, because I think manic-depression is a fascinating, sad, and amazing phenomenon. It's not a coincidence that some of the greatest artists have been manic-depressives. That made it, to me, a fascinating subject that, alas, did not come out in the film."

=== Casting ===
Figgis encouraged the lead actors to experience their characters' ordeals first-hand by extensive research. He told Film Critic: "It was just a week and a half of rehearsal. A lot of conversations. A lot of communication in the year before we made the film. Reading the book. I encouraged them [Cage and Shue] to do their own research, which they wanted to do anyway, and then ultimately the three of us got together and just started talking...talking about anything, not necessarily about the film or the script, about anything that came up." Cage did research by binge drinking in Dublin for two weeks and had a friend videotape him so he could study his speech. He said "it was one of the most enjoyable pieces of research I've ever had to do for a part." Shue spent time interviewing several Las Vegas prostitutes.

=== Filming ===
The limited budget dictated the production and Figgis ended up filming in super 16mm and composing his own score. He said "We didn't have any money, and we weren't pretending to be something we weren't. We couldn't shut down The Strip to shoot". Cage recounted that he found the use of 16mm liberating as an actor stating in a 1995 interview with Roger Ebert:

"As an actor, having a 16-mm. camera in my face was liberating because it's much smaller, so you don't feel as intimidated by it. It catches those little nuances. Because as soon as that big camera's in your face, you tense up a little bit. Film acting is a learning experience about how to get over that, but I don't know that you ever really do."

Figgis had problems because permits were not issued for some street scenes. This caused him to film some scenes on the Las Vegas strip in one take to avoid the police, which Figgis said benefited production and the authenticity of the acting, remarking "I've always hated the convention of shooting on a street, and then having to stop the traffic, and then having to tell the actors, 'Well, there's meant to be traffic here, so you're going to have to shout.' And they're shouting, but it's quiet and they feel really stupid, because it's unnatural. You put them up against a couple of trucks, with it all happening around them, and their voices become great". Filming took place over 28 days during the autumn of 1994.

== Release ==
=== Box office ===
Leaving Las Vegas had a limited release on October 27, 1995. As it won awards from multiple film critics’ organizations and earned four Academy Award nominations, the film's release was expanded and it ultimately opened nationwide on February 9, 1996. United Artists distributed the film in North America, while RCV Film Distribution and Atalanta Filmes handled the European release, and 21st Century Film Corporation distributed the film in Australia. MGM/UA reportedly spent less than $2 million marketing the film, which included TV spots and ads in industry publications.

The film was a success at the box office, particularly considering its budget, grossing $49.8 million.

=== Critical reception ===
On Rotten Tomatoes, the film received an approval rating of 91% based on 54 reviews, with an average rating of 8.0/10. The website's critical consensus reads, "Oscar-awarded Nicolas Cage finds humanity in his character as it bleeds away in this no frills, exhilaratingly dark portrait of destruction." It also holds a score of 82 out of 100 on Metacritic, based on 23 critics, indicating "universal acclaim".

Roger Ebert from Chicago Sun-Times and Rick Groen from The Globe and Mail gave the film high marks. Ebert wrote, "If there are two unplayable roles in the stock repertory, they are the drunk and the whore with a heart of gold. Cage and Shue make these cliches into unforgettable people." Ebert named the film "the best of 1995", and would eventually rank it as the eighth best film of the 1990s.

Leonard Klady from Variety wrote Leaving Las Vegas was "certainly among a scant handful of films that have taken an unflinching view of dependency."

Charles Switzer writing for Bright Lights Film Journal in 2025 said, "Even after three decades, Leaving Las Vegas remains a raw and powerful experience for its ability to portray heavy scenes that do not offer the viewer any reprieve or hope whatsoever. It stands as a testament to the power of indie filmmaking to provoke, challenge, and deeply move audiences through bold and unconventional artistry."

=== Accolades ===
Award	Category	Subject	Result	Ref.
20/20 Awards	Best Actor	Nicolas Cage	Won	
20/20 Awards	Best Actress	Elisabeth Shue	Nominated	
20/20 Awards	Best Adapted Screenplay	Mike Figgis	Nominated	
Academy Awards	Best Director	Mike Figgis	Nominated	
Academy Awards	Best Actor	Nicolas Cage	Won	
Academy Awards	Best Actress	Elisabeth Shue	Nominated	
Academy Awards	Best Screenplay – Based on Material Previously Produced or Published	Mike Figgis	Nominated	
Awards Circuit Community Awards	Best Motion Picture	Lila Cazès and Annie Stewart	Nominated	
Awards Circuit Community Awards	Best Director	Mike Figgis	Nominated	
Awards Circuit Community Awards	Best Actor in a Leading Role	Nicolas Cage	Won	
Awards Circuit Community Awards	Best Actress in a Leading Role	Elisabeth Shue	Won	
Awards Circuit Community Awards	Best Adapted Screenplay	Mike Figgis	Nominated	
Boston Society of Film Critics Awards	Best Actor	Nicolas Cage	Won	
British Academy Film Awards	Best Actor in a Leading Role	Nicolas Cage	Nominated	
British Academy Film Awards	Best Actress in a Leading Role	Elisabeth Shue	Nominated	
British Academy Film Awards	Best Adapted Screenplay	Mike Figgis	Nominated	
Chicago Film Critics Association Awards	Best Director	Mike Figgis	Nominated	
Chicago Film Critics Association Awards	Best Actor	Nicolas Cage	Won	
Chicago Film Critics Association Awards	Best Actress	Elisabeth Shue	Won	
Chlotrudis Awards	Best Actor	Nicolas Cage	Nominated	
Chlotrudis Awards	Best Actress	Elisabeth Shue	Nominated	
Critics' Choice Awards	Best Actor	Nicolas Cage	Nominated	
Dallas-Fort Worth Film Critics Association Awards	Best Picture		Won	
Dallas-Fort Worth Film Critics Association Awards	Best Director	Mike Figgis	Won	
Dallas-Fort Worth Film Critics Association Awards	Best Actor	Nicolas Cage	Won	
Dallas-Fort Worth Film Critics Association Awards	Best Actress	Elisabeth Shue	Won	
Directors Guild of America Awards	Outstanding Directorial Achievement in Motion Pictures	Mike Figgis	Nominated	
Golden Globe Awards	Best Motion Picture – Drama		Nominated	
Golden Globe Awards	Best Actor in a Motion Picture – Drama	Nicolas Cage	Won	
Golden Globe Awards	Best Actress in a Motion Picture – Drama	Elisabeth Shue	Nominated	
Golden Globe Awards	Best Director – Motion Picture	Mike Figgis	Nominated	
Independent Spirit Awards	Best Film		Won	
Independent Spirit Awards	Best Director	Mike Figgis	Won	
Independent Spirit Awards	Best Male Lead	Nicolas Cage	Nominated	
Independent Spirit Awards	Best Female Lead	Elisabeth Shue	Won	
Independent Spirit Awards	Best Screenplay	Mike Figgis	Nominated	
Independent Spirit Awards	Best Cinematography	Declan Quinn	Won	
Jupiter Awards	Best International Actor	Nicolas Cage (Note: Also for The Rock.)	Won	
Los Angeles Film Critics Association Awards	Best Film		Won	
Los Angeles Film Critics Association Awards	Best Director	Mike Figgis	Won	
Los Angeles Film Critics Association Awards	Best Actor	Nicolas Cage	Won	
Los Angeles Film Critics Association Awards	Best Actress	Elisabeth Shue	Won	
Los Angeles Film Critics Association Awards	Best Screenplay	Mike Figgis	Runner-up	
National Board of Review Awards	Top Ten Films		4th Place	
National Board of Review Awards	Best Actor	Nicolas Cage	Won	
National Society of Film Critics Awards	Best Director	Mike Figgis	Won	
National Society of Film Critics Awards	Best Actor	Nicolas Cage	Won	
National Society of Film Critics Awards	Best Actress	Elisabeth Shue	Won	
New York Film Critics Circle Awards	Best Film		Won	
New York Film Critics Circle Awards	Best Director	Mike Figgis	2nd Place	
New York Film Critics Circle Awards	Best Actor	Nicolas Cage	Won	
New York Film Critics Circle Awards	Best Actress	Elisabeth Shue	2nd Place	
San Sebastián International Film Festival	Golden Shell	Mike Figgis	Nominated	
San Sebastián International Film Festival	Best Director	Mike Figgis	Won	
San Sebastián International Film Festival	Best Actor	Nicolas Cage	Won	
Sant Jordi Awards	Best Foreign Actor	Nicolas Cage	Nominated	
Screen Actors Guild Awards	Outstanding Performance by a Male Actor in a Leading Role	Nicolas Cage	Won	
Screen Actors Guild Awards	Outstanding Performance by a Female Actor in a Leading Role	Elisabeth Shue	Nominated	
Society of Texas Film Critics Awards	Best Actor	Nicolas Cage	Won	
Turkish Film Critics Association Awards	Best Foreign Film		10th Place	
Writers Guild of America Awards	Best Screenplay – Based on Material Previously Produced or Published	Mike Figgis	Nominated	

== Home media ==
The VHS and DVD of the film were released by MGM Home Entertainment. The VHS was released on November 12, 1996 in two languages, English and Russian, while the DVD was released on January 1, 1998 in English, in the USA and Canada. Australian and UK editions later were released. The DVD contains a supplemental "Hidden Page" menu feature.

The film was also released on Blu-ray, HD DVD, and LaserDisc.

== Soundtrack ==
A soundtrack album, consisting mainly of film score composed and performed by Mike Figgis, was released November 7, 1995. The soundtrack also included three jazz standards performed by Sting and excerpts of dialogue from the film. A version of "Lonely Teardrops" performed by Michael McDonald from The New York Rock and Soul Revue: Live at the Beacon that features in the film is not included.

All tracks are written by Mike Figgis except as noted.

No.	Title	Writer(s)	Performer	Length
1.	"Intro Dialogue" (dialogue)		Nicolas Cage as Ben; Elisabeth Shue as Sera	0:32
2.	"Angel Eyes"	Matt Dennis, Earl Brent	Sting	4:02
3.	"Are You Desirable?"		Mike Figgis	2:43
4.	"Ben & Bill" (dialogue)		Nicolas Cage as Ben	0:30
5.	"Leaving Las Vegas"		Mike Figgis	3:12
6.	"Sera's Dark Side"		Mike Figgis	1:26
7.	"Mara"		Mike Figgis	4:28
8.	"Burlesque"		Mike Figgis	2:40
9.	"On the Street" (dialogue)		Nicolas Cage as Ben; Elisabeth Shue as Sera	0:28
10.	"Bossa Vega"		Mike Figgis	3:14
11.	"Ben Pawns His Rolex/Sera Talks to Her Shrink" (dialogue)		Nicolas Cage as Ben; Elisabeth Shue as Sera	0:37
12.	"My One and Only Love"	Robert Mellin, Guy Wood	Sting	3:36
13.	"Sera Invites Ben to Stay" (dialogue)		Nicolas Cage as Ben; Elisabeth Shue as Sera	0:31
14.	"Come Rain or Come Shine"	Harold Arlen, Johnny Mercer	Don Henley	3:41
15.	"Ben and Sera – Theme" (dialogue)		Nicolas Cage as Ben; Elisabeth Shue as Sera	2:18
16.	"Ridiculous"	Phil Roy, Nicolas Cage	Nicolas Cage	1:03
17.	"Biker Bar"		Mike Figgis	3:44
18.	"Ben's Hell"		Mike Figgis	1:37
19.	"It's a Lonesome Old Town"	Harry Tobias, Charles Kisco	Sting	2:37
20.	"Blues for Ben"		Mike Figgis	1:56
21.	"Get Out"		Mike Figgis	1:49
22.	"Reunited"		Mike Figgis	3:28
23.	"Sera Talks to the Cab Driver" (dialogue)		Elisabeth Shue as Sera; Lou Rawls as Concerned Cabbie	0:23
24.	"She Really Loved Him"		Mike Figgis	1:17
25.	"I Won't Be Going South for a While"	Angelo Palladino	The Palladinos	4:27

== See also ==
- List of films set in Las Vegas
