= Safe (1995 film) =

- Theatrical release poster
- Directed by: Todd Haynes
- Written by: Todd Haynes
- Produced by: Christine Vachon
- Starring: Julianne Moore; Peter Friedman; Xander Berkeley; Susan Norman; Kate McGregor-Stewart; James LeGros
- Cinematography: Alex Nepomniaschy
- Edited by: James Lyons
- Music by: Brendan Dolan; Ed Tomney
- Production companies: American Playhouse Theatrical Films; Killer Films; Channel 4 Films; Good Machine
- Distributed by: Sony Pictures Classics (United States); Metro Tartan Distribution (United Kingdom)
- Release dates: January 25, 1995 (Sundance); June 30, 1995 (United States); April 26, 1996 (United Kingdom)
- Running time: 119 minutes
- Countries: United States; United Kingdom
- Language: English
- Budget: $1 million
- Box office: $512,245

Safe is a 1995 psychological drama film written and directed by Todd Haynes. The film stars Julianne Moore, Peter Friedman, Xander Berkeley, and James LeGros. Set in Los Angeles in 1987, it follows Carol White (Moore), a suburban housewife whose monotonous life abruptly changes when she becomes sick with a mysterious illness which she believes is caused by the environment around her. Principal photography began in Los Angeles on January 3, 1994, and concluded on February 13.

Safe premiered at the Sundance Film Festival on January 25, 1995, and was theatrically released in the United States on June 30. Despite underperforming commercially, the film received critical acclaim, with particular praise for Moore's performance. It received four nominations at the 11th Independent Spirit Awards, Best Feature, Best Female Lead for Moore, and Best Director and Best Screenplay for Haynes.

Safe topped the "best film of the 1990s" poll by The Village Voice, and was described by critics as "the scariest film of the year", "a mesmerizing horror movie", and "a work of feminist counter-cinema". In 2015, Haynes said that the themes explored throughout the film, disease and immunity in a post-industrial landscape and how recovery is a burden often placed on victims of illness, were even more relevant than they were at the time of its release.

== Plot ==
In 1987, Carol White is a housewife living in an affluent suburb of Los Angeles with her husband Greg and stepson Rory. She spends her days gardening, doing aerobics, and meeting friends. Her marriage and family life appear stable but sterile, and her friends are polite but distant. After the family's home is renovated, Carol begins experiencing physical symptoms in everyday situations: She coughs uncontrollably when exposed to exhaust fumes from a nearby truck while driving, suffers a panic attack at a baby shower, and has a nosebleed while getting a perm at a hair salon. As her symptoms worsen, she becomes convinced that they are triggered by exposure to chemicals. Finally, she collapses while at her dry cleaners, which is being fumigated with pesticides.

Doctors are unable to diagnose or treat Carol and state that she is physically healthy. She attends psychotherapy sessions, but her symptoms do not improve. She finds herself very alone with her condition, as her community remains indifferent to her suffering. While hospitalized, Carol watches an advertisement for Wrenwood, a new-age desert community for people with "environmental illnesses." The commune is led by Peter Dunning, an author who encourages residents to use self-help techniques. Realizing that she can no longer function in her current life, she leaves everything behind and moves to Wrenwood.

Even in a community of people who are friendly towards her and suffer from similar health problems, Carol becomes increasingly isolated despite claiming that she is getting better. Lesions appear on her face and she increasingly relies on an oxygen tank. Eventually, she moves into an insulated dome separated from the rest of the community. There, as a "treatment" suggested by others in the commune, she looks into a mirror and repeats, "I love you" to herself.

== Cast ==
- Julianne Moore as Carol White
- Peter Friedman as Peter Dunning
- Xander Berkeley as Greg White
- Chauncey Leopardi (credited as Chauncy Leopardi) as Rory White
- James LeGros as Chris
- Martha Veléz as Fulvia
- Susan Norman as Linda
- Kate McGregor-Stewart as Claire
- Mary Carver as Nell
- Steven Gilborn as Dr. Hubbard
- Peter Crombie as Dr. Reynolds
- April Grace as Susan
- Lorna Scott as Marilyn
- Jodie Markell as Anita
- Brandon Cruz as Steve
- Dean Norris as Mover
- Jessica Harper as Joyce
- Beth Grant as Becky
- Rio Hackford as Lester

== Production ==
Haynes first heard about "environmental illness" in 1991 on a TV magazine program that referred to it as "20th Century Disease". He and producer Vachon interviewed organizations that advocate for people who have environmental illness, such as Response Team for the Chemically Injured in Atascadero, California and The Chemical Connection in Wimberley, Texas. The monologue that Carol gives during her birthday party was based on transcripts of one of the interviews from Wimberley. Haynes also did research into New Age healing practices, and was especially interested in the work of Louise Hay, whose books became popular among gay men during the AIDS epidemic by telling them that self-love would heal their illness. The fictional Wrenwood was inspired by a yoga retreat at Kripalu Center. Haynes also drew inspiration from films such as Jeanne Dielman, 23 quai du Commerce, 1080 Bruxelles, 2001: A Space Odyssey and The Boy in the Plastic Bubble.

For the script, Haynes has said that the conceptual origin involved setting up barriers that prevent the audience from getting emotionally close to the character of Carol, which was a concept he explored again in Far from Heaven. He used political red herrings to make the audience trust certain characters at first, such as the leader of Wrenwood being a gay man. Since Haynes himself is gay, he thought the audience would expect the gay character to be trustworthy.

For the role of Carol, Haynes was initially interested in Susan Norman—who was later cast as Linda instead—but Julianne Moore's agent reached out to Vachon and insisted on an interview with her for the role. Moore knew exactly how to play the character of Carol as soon as she read the script: "I wanted the character to not put any weight on her larynx at all", so that's what she did in the audition that won her the part.

Cinematographer Alex Nepomniaschy suggested the look of Red Desert to Haynes after reading the script, and together they decided never to let the camera get very close to any of the characters as a way to keep emotional distance.

Potential investors wanted him to replicate the elements that had worked well in Haynes' previous film Poison, but since this film was different in so many ways, it took a long time to find the funding for it. The budget was around $1 million. Finally, filming began on January 1, 1994, in Los Angeles, and lasted 6 weeks.

For the film's premiere at Sundance, Haynes had removed the shot of Peter's mansion, but put it back in after hearing audience feedback because he wanted to emphasize Peter's hypocrisy.

Ultimately, the film presents no answer for her illness or predicament. Her condition is given no name in the film, but director Haynes confirmed that it is a depiction of multiple chemical sensitivity. He also said that Carol's isolation was both the answer and the problem for her.

== Release ==
The film had its world premiere at the Sundance Film Festival on January 25, 1995. There were reports of people walking out of the theater because they didn't understand the movie. Vachon has said that critics at the premiere were mixed about the film, but by the end of the decade many had come around to it and placed the film among the decade's best.

In May of 1995, it played at the 48th Cannes Film Festival in the Directors' Fortnight section.

Sony Pictures Classics acquired distribution rights to the film and released the film in a limited release on June 23, 1995.

== Reception and legacy ==
=== Critical response ===
Safe received positive reviews from critics. Rotten Tomatoes reports 88% approval based on 67 reviews. The website's critics consensus reads, "Safe's eerie social satire and somewhat sterile stylization is balanced by comedic undertones and an impressive, understated performance from Julianne Moore." The film also holds a score of 76/100 on Metacritic. Janet Maslin, writing in The New York Times, lauds the first half of the film, but concludes that, as "brilliantly as it begins, Safe eventually succumbs to its own modern malady, as the film maker insists on a chilly ambiguity that breeds more detachment than interest ... Mr. Haynes makes fools of ... [the film's] New Agers while possibly embracing some of their views." Another problem, according to Maslin, is that "the shadow of AIDS implicitly hangs over …[Carol's] decline, but it doesn't help bring Safe to a conclusion worthy of its inspired beginning."

The ending of the film is highly ambiguous, and has created considerable debate among critics and audiences as to whether Carol has emancipated herself, or simply traded one form of suffocation for an equally constricting identity as a reclusive invalid. Julie Grossman argues in her article "The Trouble with Carol" that Haynes concludes the film as a challenge to traditional Hollywood film narratives of the heroine taking charge of her life, and that Haynes sets Carol up as the victim both of a male-dominated society, and also of an equally debilitating self-help culture that encourages patients to take sole responsibility for their illness and recovery.

Carol's illness, although unidentified, has been seen as an analogy for the 1980s AIDS crisis, a similarly uncomfortable and largely unspoken "threat" during the Reagan presidency.

=== Accolades ===
Safe received seven votes in the British Film Institute's 2012 Sight & Sound poll of the greatest films – with five votes from critics and two from directors – ranking it 323rd and 322nd, respectively.

The movie was widely critically acclaimed. It gave Moore her first leading role in a feature film and gave Haynes a measure of mainstream critical recognition.

- 1996 Independent Spirit Awards - Nominated for Best Director (Todd Haynes), Best Feature, Best Female Lead (Julianne Moore), and Best Screenplay (Todd Haynes)
- 1995 Boston Society of Film Critics Awards - Best Cinematography - Alex Nepomniaschy
- 1995 Seattle International Film Festival - American Independent Award - Todd Haynes
- 1996 Rotterdam International Film Festival - FIPRESCI Prize Special Mention - Todd Haynes
- 1999 Village Voice Film Poll - Winner VVFP - Award Best Film of the Decade
