= Chicago Film Critics Association Awards 1995 =

Annual US film awards ceremony

The 8th Chicago Film Critics Association Awards honored the finest achievements in 1995 filmmaking and were held on March 12, 1996.

== Winners ==
- Best Actor:
  - Nicolas Cage - Leaving Las Vegas
- Best Actress:
  - Elisabeth Shue - Leaving Las Vegas
- Best Cinematography:
  - Darius Khondji - Se7en
- Best Director:
  - Oliver Stone - Nixon
- Best Film:
  - Apollo 13
- Best Foreign Language Film:
  - Il postino (The Postman), Italy/France/Belgium
- Best Score:
  - "Toy Story" - Randy Newman
- Best Screenplay:
  - The Usual Suspects
- Best Supporting Actor:
  - Kevin Spacey - The Usual Suspects
- Best Supporting Actress:
  - Joan Allen - Nixon
- Most Promising Actor:
  - Greg Kinnear - Sabrina
- Most Promising Actress:
  - Minnie Driver - Circle of Friends
