= 1st Critics' Choice Awards =

1996 US film awards

1st Critics' Choice Movie Awards
- Date: January 22, 1996
- Official website: www.criticschoice.com

Highlights
- Best Film: Sense and Sensibility

The 1st Critics' Choice Movie Awards were presented on January 22, 1996, honoring the finest achievements of 1995 filmmaking.

== Winners ==
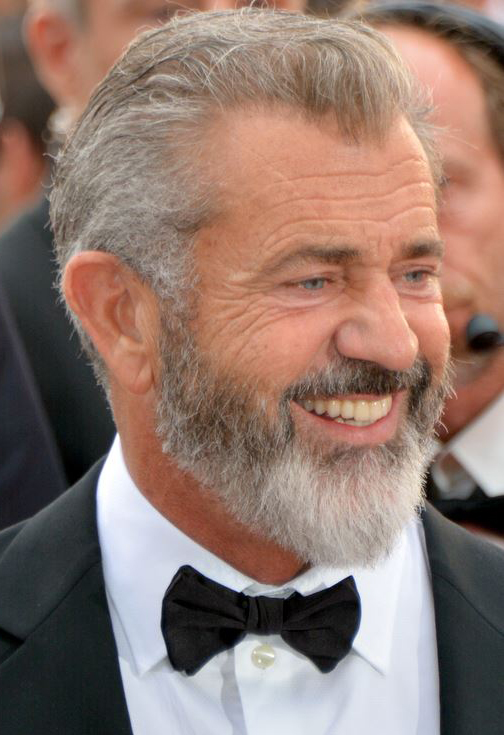
Mel Gibson, Best Director winner

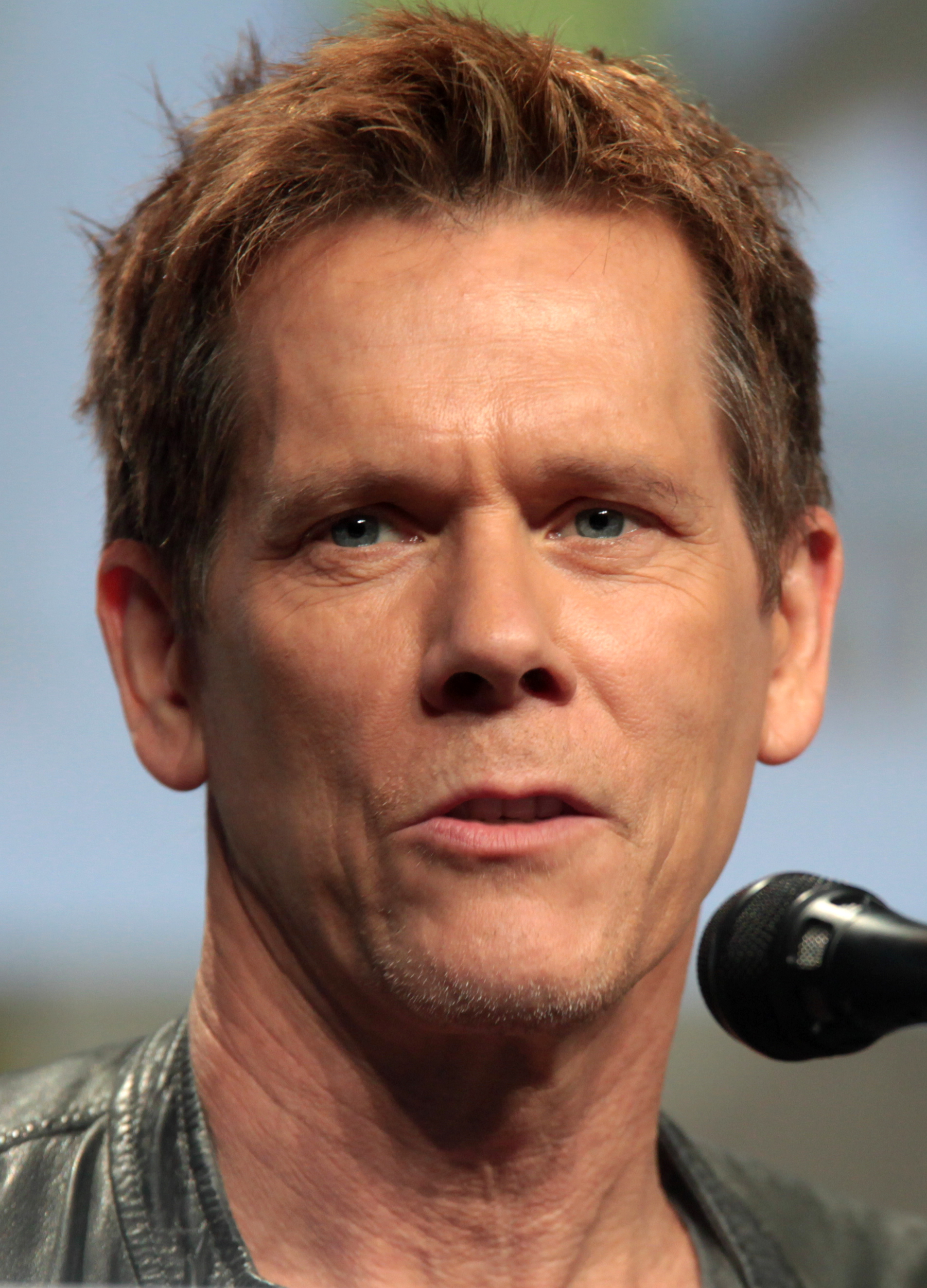
Kevin Bacon, Best Actor winner

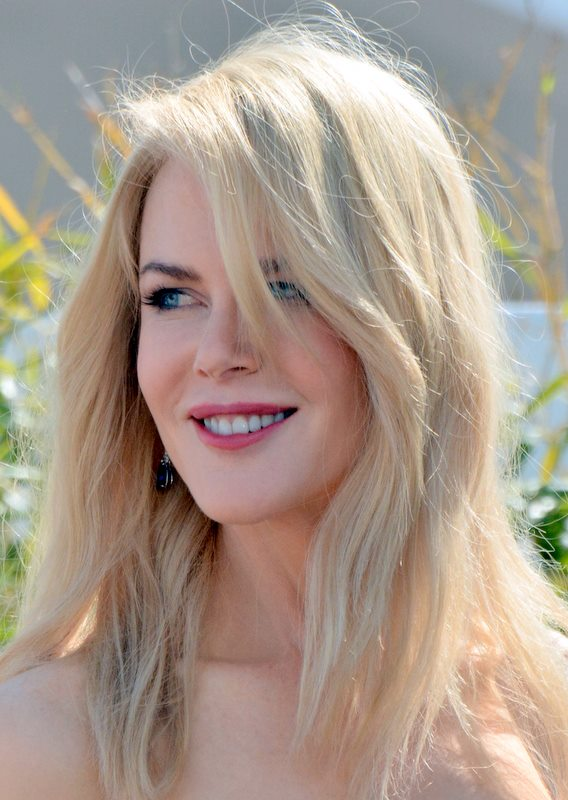
Nicole Kidman, Best Actress winner

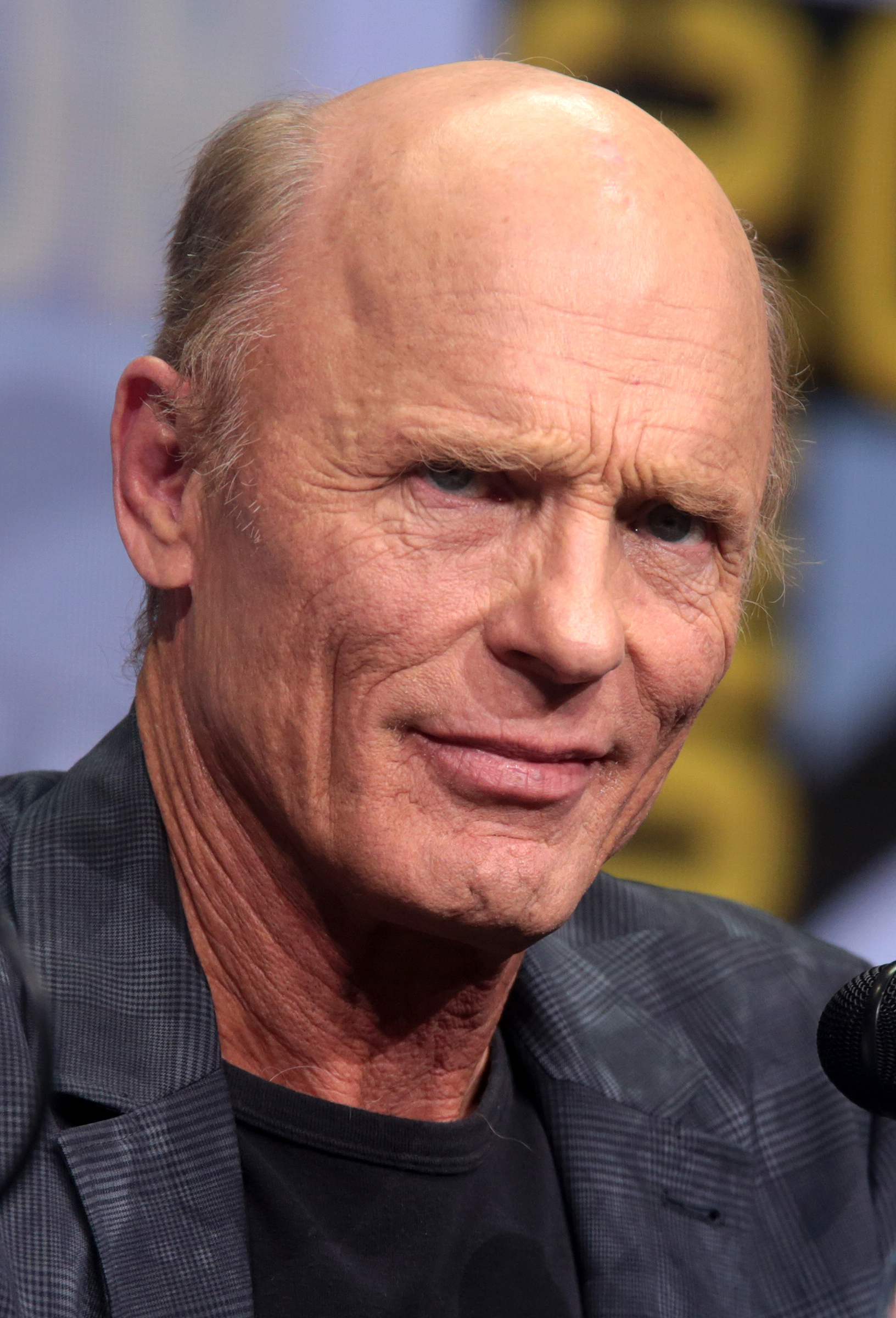
Ed Harris, Best Supporting Actor co-winner

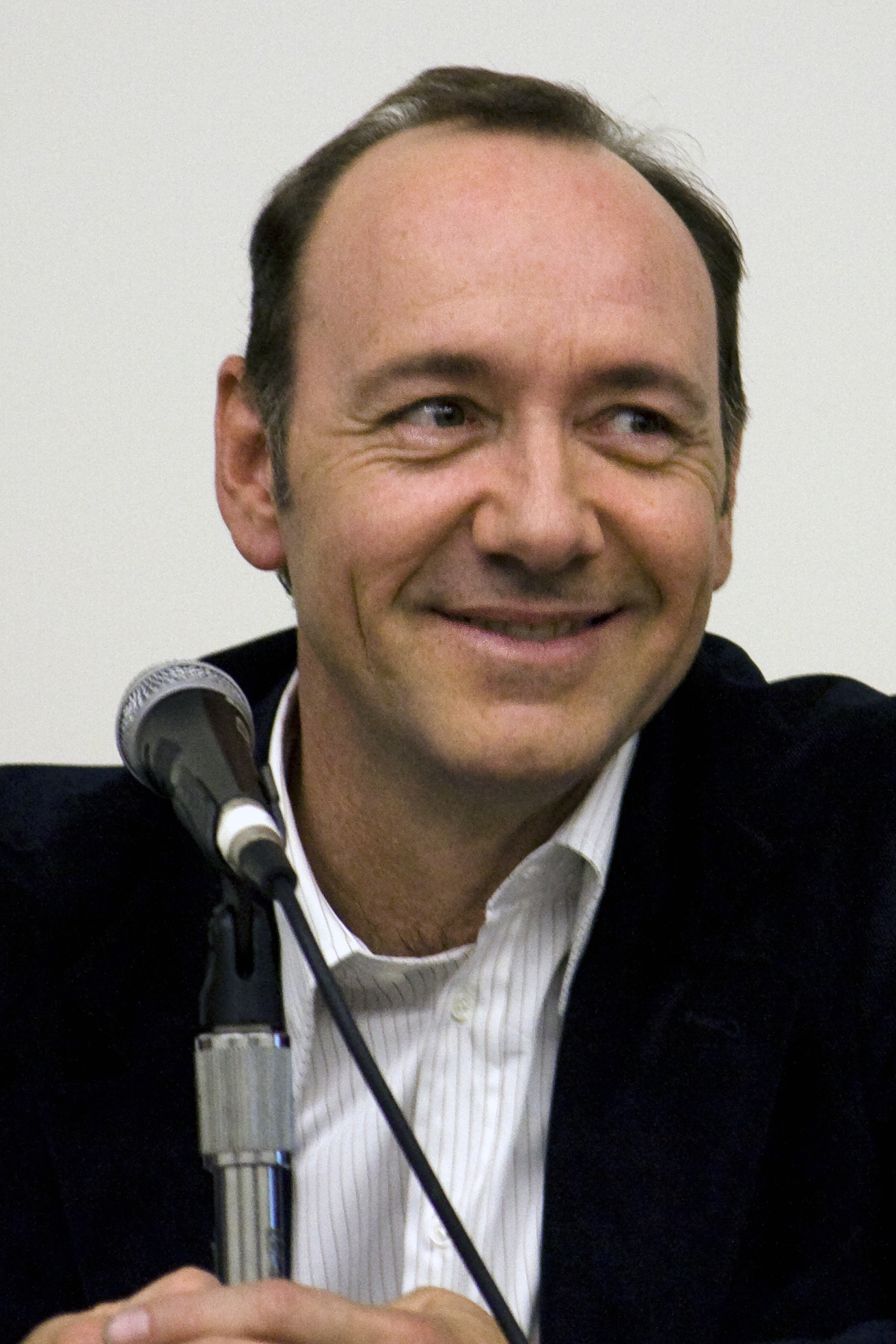
Kevin Spacey, Best Supporting Actor co-winner

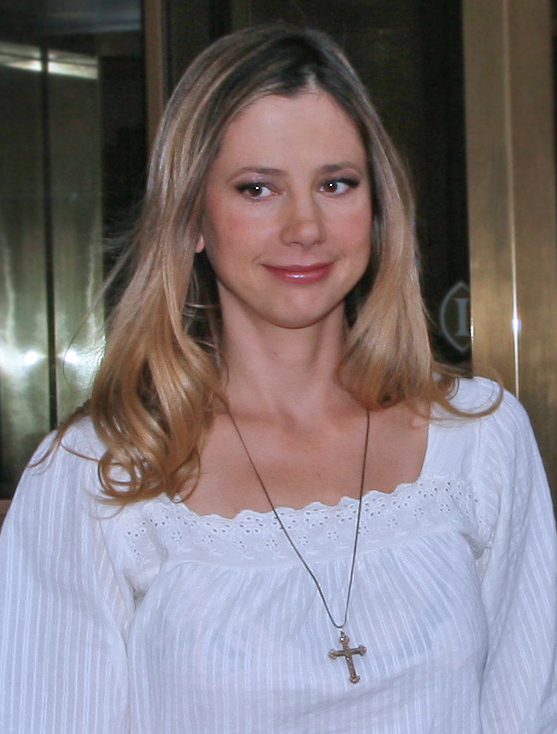
Mira Sorvino, Best Supporting Actress winner

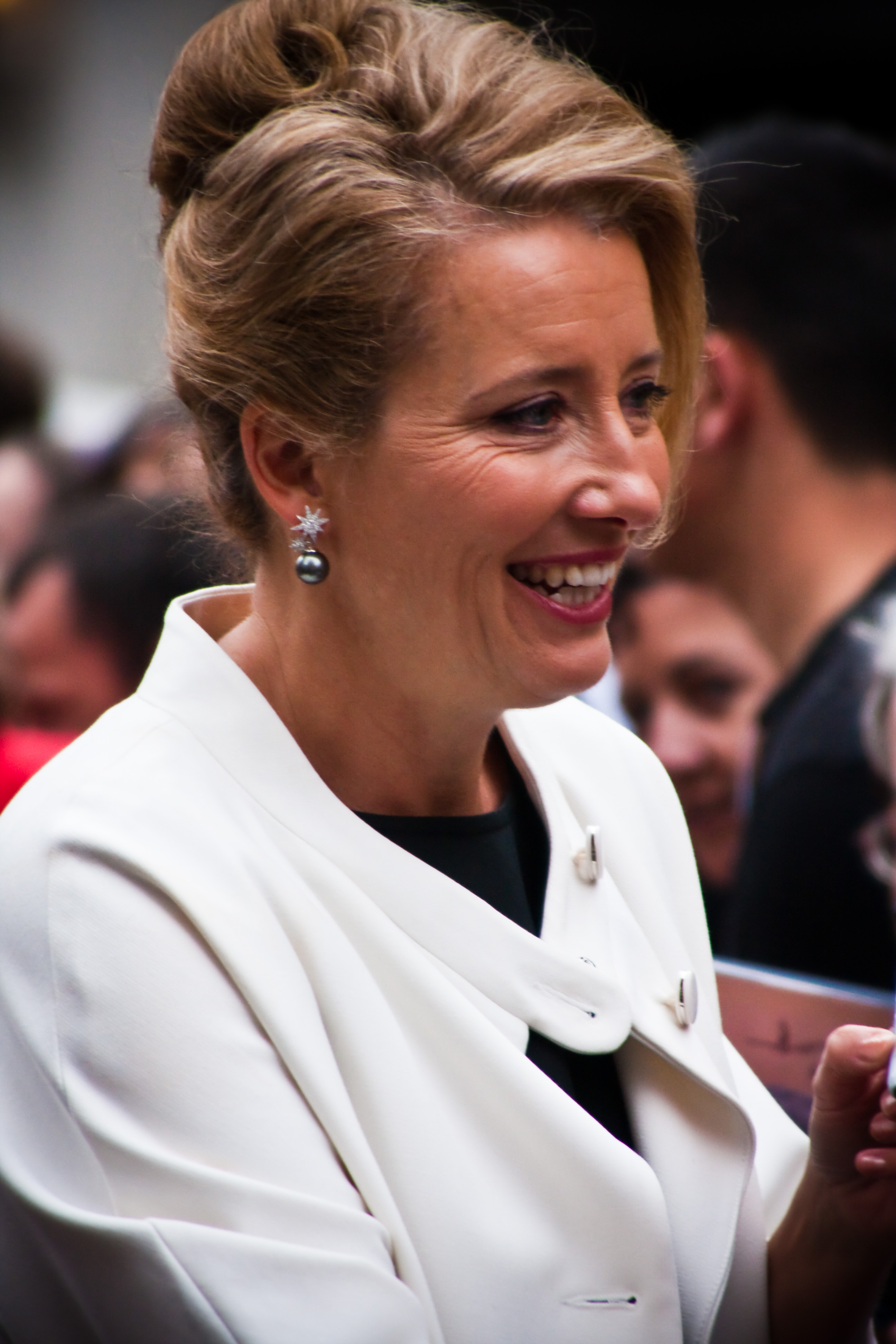
Emma Thompson, Best Screenplay winner

- Best Actor:
  - Kevin Bacon – Murder in the First
- Best Actress:
  - Nicole Kidman – To Die For
- Best Director:
  - Mel Gibson – Braveheart
- Best Documentary:
  - Crumb
- Best Foreign Language Film:
  - Il Postino: The Postman (Il postino) • Belgium / France / Italy
- Best Picture:
  - Sense and Sensibility
- Best Screenplay:
  - Sense and Sensibility – Emma Thompson
- Best Special Family Film Award:
  - Babe
- Best Supporting Actor:
  - Ed Harris – Apollo 13, Just Cause, and Nixon (TIE)
  - Kevin Spacey – Outbreak, Se7en, Swimming with Sharks, and The Usual Suspects (TIE)
- Best Supporting Actress:
  - Mira Sorvino – Mighty Aphrodite
