= 49th British Academy Film Awards =

1996 film awards ceremony

- Date: 23 April 1996
- Site: Theatre Royal, Drury Lane
- Hosted by: Angus Deayton

Highlights
- Best Film: Sense and Sensibility
- Best British Film: The Madness of King George
- Best Actor: Nigel Hawthorne; The Madness of King George
- Best Actress: Emma Thompson; Sense and Sensibility
- Most awards: Braveheart, The Madness of King George, The Postman and Sense and Sensibility (3)
- Most nominations: The Madness of King George (14)

The 49th British Academy Film Awards, more commonly known as the BAFTAs, took place on 23 April 1996 at the Theatre Royal, Drury Lane in London, honouring the best national and foreign films of 1995. Presented by the British Academy of Film and Television Arts, accolades were handed out for the best feature-length film and documentaries of any nationality that were screened at British cinemas in 1995.

Ang Lee's Sense and Sensibility won the award for Best Film. The film also won awards for Best Actress (Emma Thompson) and Supporting Actress (Kate Winslet). Il postino (The Postman), directed by Michael Radford, won the awards for Best Director, Film Not in the English Language, and Original Music. Nigel Hawthorne won Best Actor in a Leading Role for his performance in The Madness of King George; the same film was voted Outstanding British Film of the Year. Additionally, Tim Roth won the award for Best Supporting Actor for his role as Archibald Cunningham in Rob Roy.

The ceremony was hosted by Angus Deayton, who was reportedly paid £50,000 for hosting.

== Winners and nominees ==
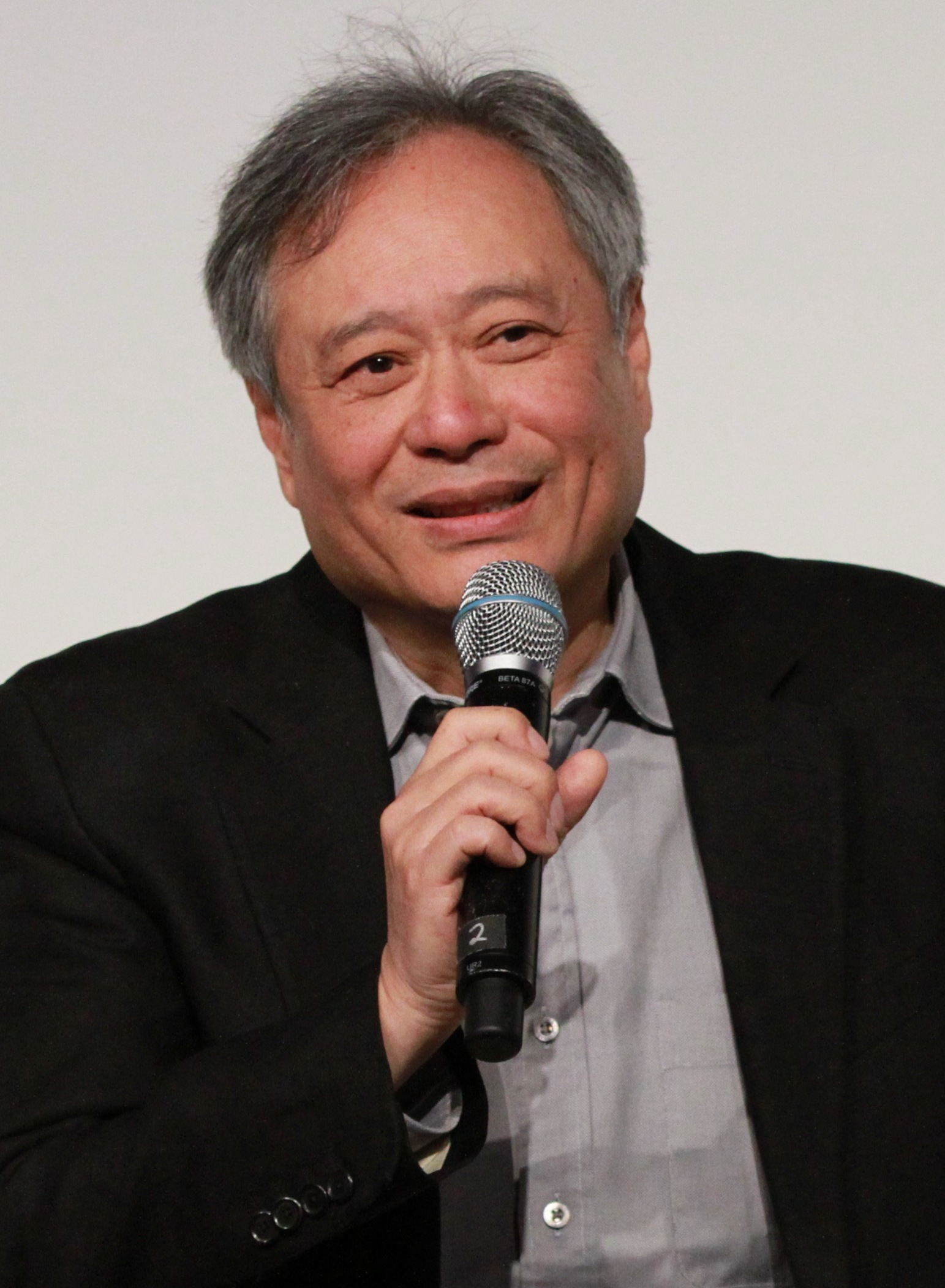
Ang Lee, Best Film co-winner

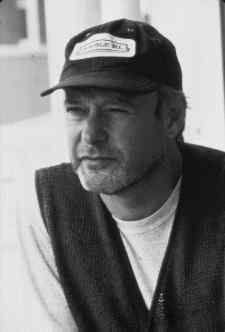
Michael Radford, Best Director winner

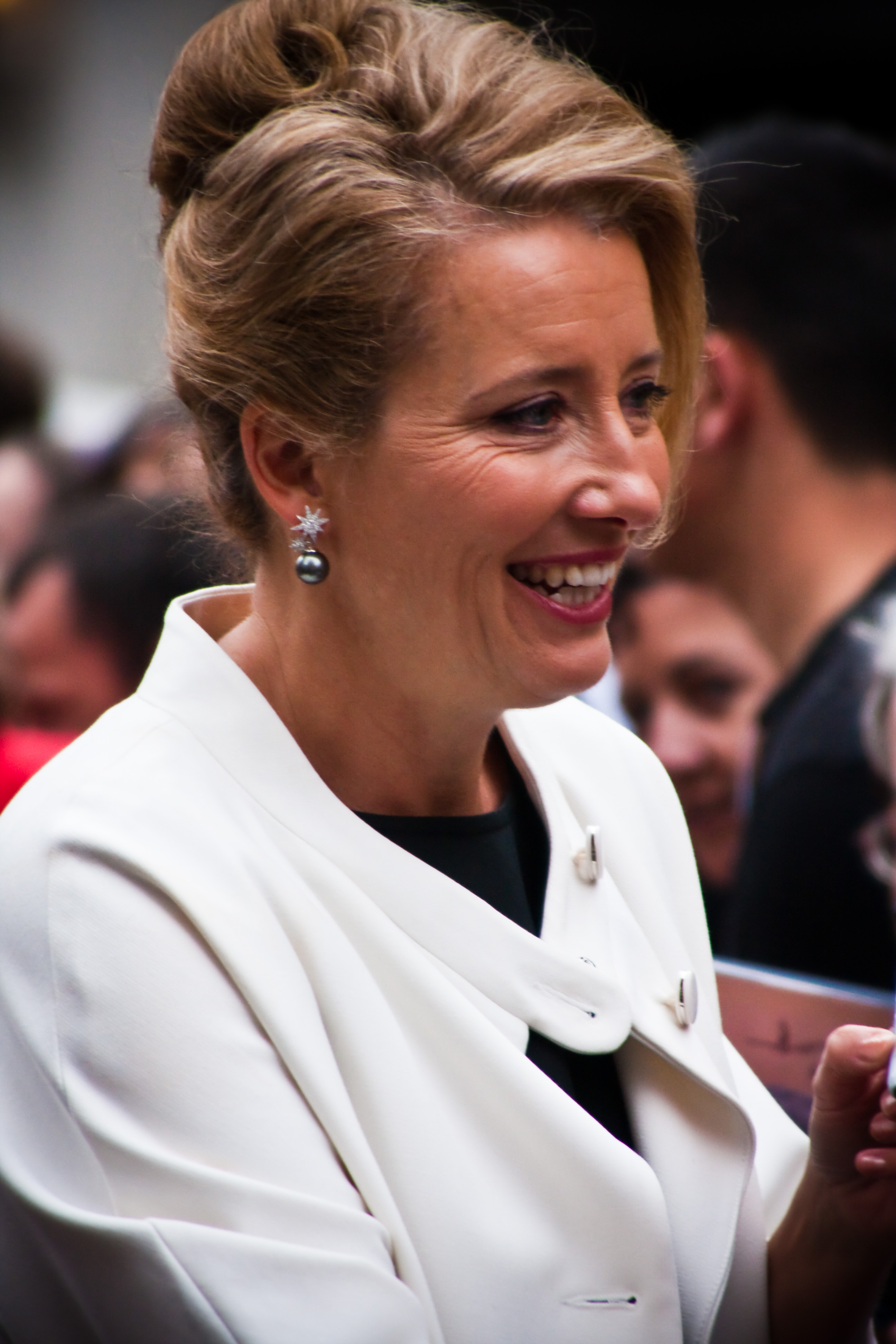
Emma Thompson, Best Actress winner

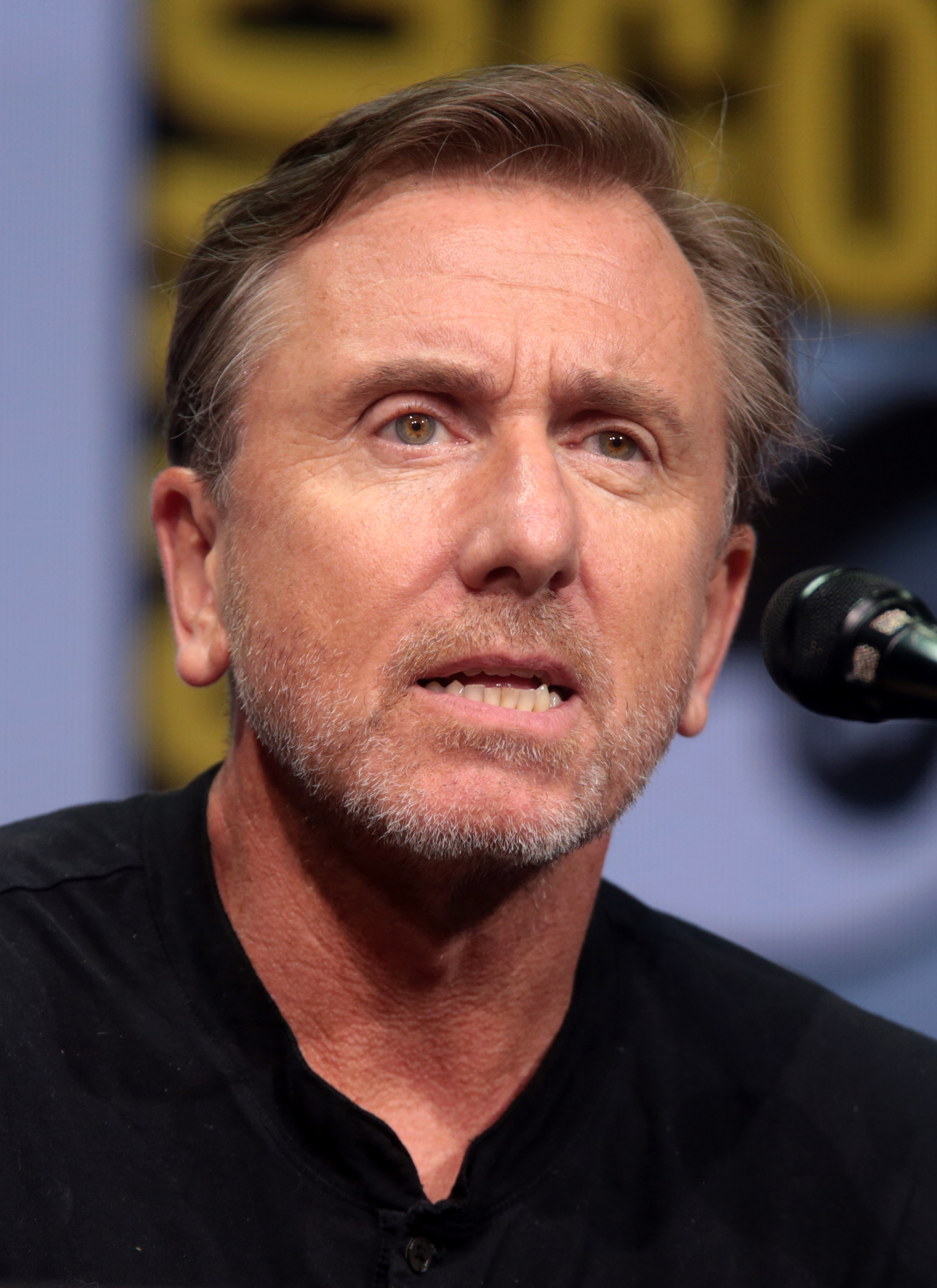
Tim Roth, Best Supporting Actor winner

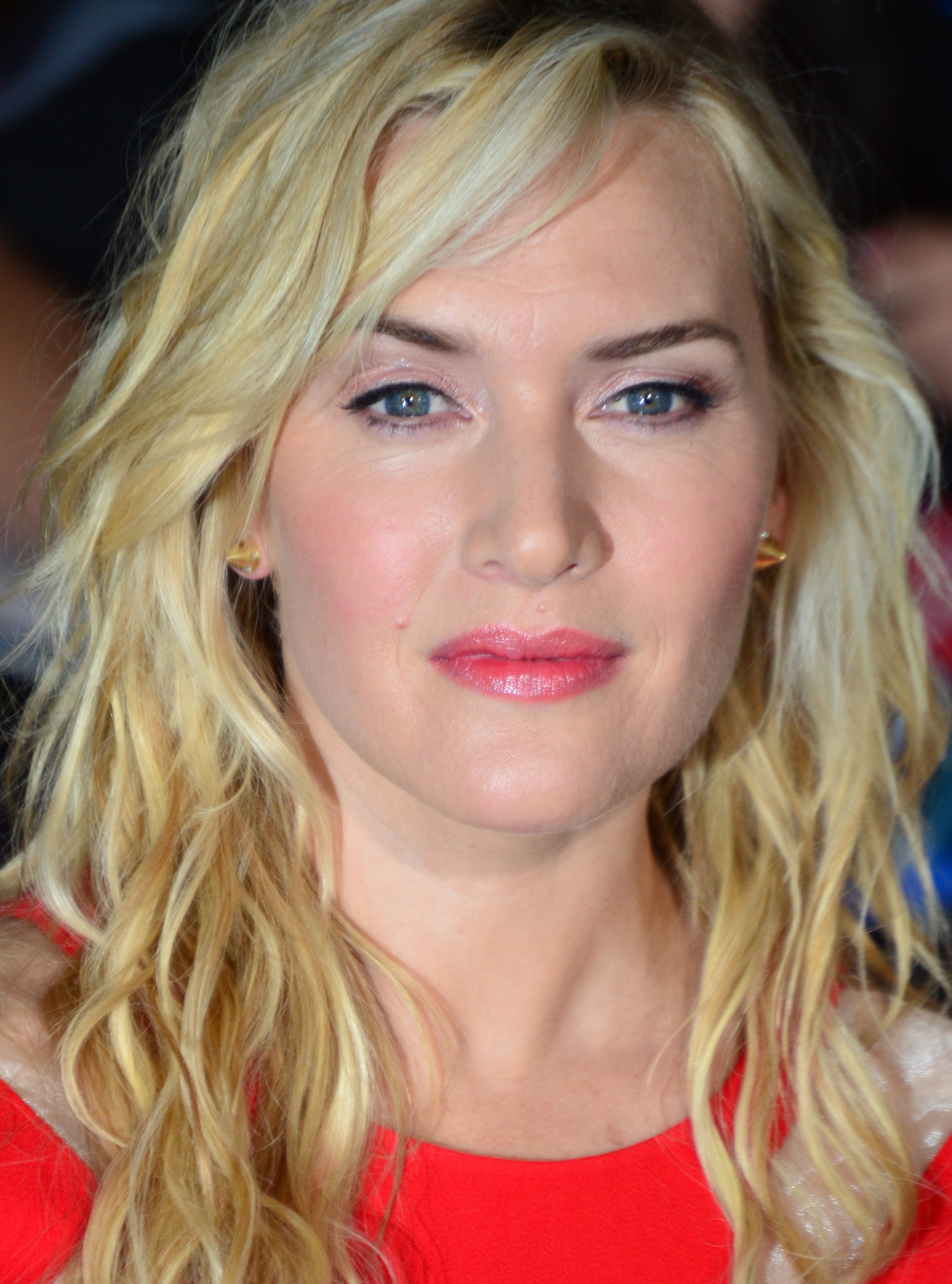
Kate Winslet, Best Supporting Actress winner

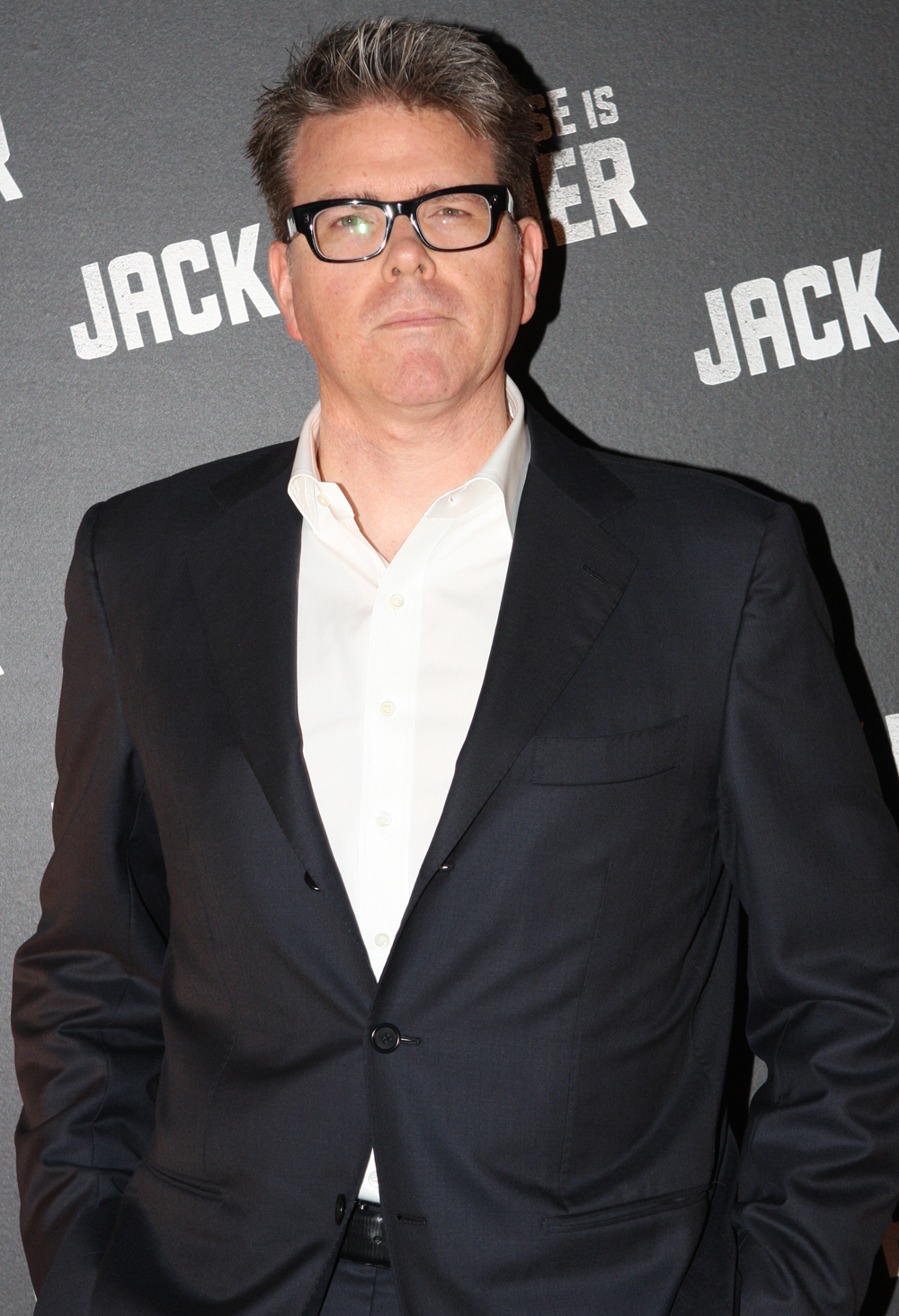
Christopher McQuarrie, Best Original Screenplay winner

=== BAFTA Fellowship ===
- **Jeanne Moreau**, **Ronald Neame**, **John Schlesinger** and **Maggie Smith**

=== Outstanding British Contribution to Cinema ===
- **Mike Leigh**

=== BAFTA Special Award ===
- **Freddie Young**

=== Awards ===
Winners are listed first and highlighted in boldface.

**Best Film**: **Sense and Sensibility – Lindsay Doran and Ang Lee**; Babe – George Miller, Doug Mitchell, Bill Miller and Chris Noonan; The Madness of King George – Stephen Evans, David Parfitt and Nicholas Hytner; The Usual Suspects – Bryan Singer and Michael McDonnell	**Best Direction**: **Michael Radford – Il Postino: The Postman**; Mel Gibson – Braveheart; Nicholas Hytner – The Madness of King George; Ang Lee – Sense and Sensibility
**Best Actor in a Leading Role**: **Nigel Hawthorne – The Madness of King George as King George III**; Nicolas Cage – Leaving Las Vegas as Ben Sanderson; Jonathan Pryce – Carrington as Lytton Strachey; Massimo Troisi – Il Postino: The Postman as Mario Ruoppolo	**Best Actress in a Leading Role**: **Emma Thompson – Sense and Sensibility as Elinor Dashwood**; Nicole Kidman – To Die For as Suzanne Stone-Maretto; Helen Mirren – The Madness of King George as Queen Charlotte; Elisabeth Shue – Leaving Las Vegas as Sera
**Best Actor in a Supporting Role**: **Tim Roth – Rob Roy as Archibald Cunningham**; Ian Holm – The Madness of King George as Francis Willis; Martin Landau – Ed Wood as Bela Lugosi; Alan Rickman – Sense and Sensibility as Colonel Brandon	**Best Actress in a Supporting Role**: **Kate Winslet – Sense and Sensibility as Marianne Dashwood**; Joan Allen – Nixon as Pat Nixon; Mira Sorvino – Mighty Aphrodite as Linda Ash; Elizabeth Spriggs – Sense and Sensibility as Mrs. Jennings
**Best Original Screenplay**: **The Usual Suspects – Christopher McQuarrie**; Bullets Over Broadway – Woody Allen and Douglas McGrath; Muriel's Wedding – P. J. Hogan; Seven – Andrew Kevin Walker	**Best Adapted Screenplay**: **Trainspotting – John Hodge**; Babe – George Miller and Chris Noonan; Il Postino: The Postman – Anna Pavignano, Michael Radford, Furio Scarpelli, Giacomo Scarpelli and Massimo Troisi; Leaving Las Vegas – Mike Figgis; The Madness of King George – Alan Bennett; Sense and Sensibility – Emma Thompson
**Best Cinematography**: **Braveheart – John Toll**; Apollo 13 – Dean Cundey; The Madness of King George – Andrew Dunn; Sense and Sensibility – Michael Coulter	**Best Costume Design**: **Braveheart – Charles Knode**; The Madness of King George – Mark Thompson; Restoration – James Acheson; Sense and Sensibility – Jenny Beavan and John Bright
**Best Editing**: **The Usual Suspects – John Ottman**; Apollo 13 – Mike Hill and Dan Hanley; Babe – Marcus D'Arcy and Jay Friedkin; The Madness of King George – Tariq Anwar	**Best Makeup and Hair**: **The Madness of King George – Lisa Westcott**; Braveheart – Peter Frampton, Paul Pattison and Lois Burwell; Ed Wood – Ve Neill, Rick Baker and Yolanda Toussieng; Sense and Sensibility – Morag Ross and Jan Archibald
**Best Original Music**: **Il Postino: The Postman – Luis Bacalov**; Braveheart – James Horner; The Madness of King George – George Fenton; Sense and Sensibility – Patrick Doyle	**Best Production Design**: **Apollo 13 – Michael Corenblith**; Braveheart – Thomas E. Sanders; The Madness of King George – Ken Adam; Sense and Sensibility – Luciana Arrighi
**Best Sound**: **Braveheart – Per Hallberg, Lon Bender, Brian Simmons, Andy Nelson, Scott Millan and Anna Behlmer**; Apollo 13 – David MacMillan, Rick Dior, Scott Millan and Steve Pederson; GoldenEye – Jim Shields, David John, Graham V. Hartstone, John Hayward and Michael A. Carter; The Madness of King George – Christopher Ackland, David Crozier and Robin O'Donoghue	**Best Special Visual Effects**: **Apollo 13 – Robert Legato, Michael Kanfer, Matt Sweeney and Leslie Ekker**; Babe – Scott E. Anderson, Neal Scanlan, John Cox, Chris Chitty and Charles Gibson; GoldenEye – Chris Corbould, Derek Meddings and Brian Smithies; Waterworld – Michael J. McAlister, Brad Kuehn, Robert Spurlock and Martin Bresin
**Outstanding British Film**: **The Madness of King George – Stephen Evans, David Parfitt and Nicholas Hytner**; Carrington – Ronald Shedlo, John McGrath and Christopher Hampton; Land and Freedom – Rebecca O'Brien and Ken Loach; Trainspotting – Andrew Macdonald and Danny Boyle	**Best Film Not in the English Language**: **Il Postino: The Postman – Mario Cecchi Gori, Vittorio Cecchi Gori, Gaetano Daniele and Michael Radford**; Burnt by the Sun – Nikita Mikhalkov and Michel Seydoux; La Reine Margot – Pierre Grunstein and Patrice Chéreau; Les Misérables – Claude Lelouch
**Best Short Animation**: **A Close Shave – Carla Shelley, Michael Rose and Nick Park**; Achilles – Glenn Holberton and Barry Purves; Gogs Ogof – Deinial Morris and Michael Mort; The Tickler Talks – Steven Harding-Hill	**Best Short Film**: **It's Not Unusual – Asmaa Pirzada and Kfir Yefet**; Cabbage – Noelle Pickford and David Stewart; Hello, Hello, Hello – Helen Booth, James Roberts and David Thewlis; The Last Post – Neris Thomas and Edward Blum

== Statistics ==
Films that received multiple nominations
Nominations	Film
14	The Madness of King George
12	Sense and Sensibility
7	Braveheart
5	Apollo 13
5	Il Postino: The Postman
4	Babe
3	Leaving Las Vegas
3	The Usual Suspects
2	Carrington
2	Ed Wood
2	GoldenEye
2	Trainspotting

Films that received multiple awards
Awards	Film
3	Braveheart
3	Il Postino: The Postman
3	The Madness of King George
3	Sense and Sensibility
2	Apollo 13
2	The Usual Suspects

== See also ==
- 68th Academy Awards
- 21st César Awards
- 1st Critics' Choice Awards
- 48th Directors Guild of America Awards
- 9th European Film Awards
- 53rd Golden Globe Awards
- 7th Golden Laurel Awards
- 16th Golden Raspberry Awards
- 10th Goya Awards
- 11th Independent Spirit Awards
- 1st Lumière Awards
- 22nd Saturn Awards
- 2nd Screen Actors Guild Awards
- 48th Writers Guild of America Awards
