= Babe: Pig in the City =

1998 film

- Theatrical release poster
- Directed by: George Miller
- Screenplay by: George Miller; Judy Morris; Mark Lamprell
- Based on: Characters by Dick King-Smith
- Produced by: Doug Mitchell; George Miller; Bill Miller
- Starring: Magda Szubanski; James Cromwell; Mary Stein; Mickey Rooney
- Cinematography: Andrew Lesnie
- Edited by: Jay Friedkin; Margaret Sixel
- Music by: Nigel Westlake
- Production company: Kennedy Miller Productions
- Distributed by: Universal Pictures
- Release dates: 25 November 1998 (United States); 10 December 1998 (Australia)
- Running time: 96 minutes
- Countries: Australia; United States
- Language: English
- Budget: $90 million
- Box office: $69.1 million

Babe: Pig in the City is a 1998 comedy-drama adventure film and a sequel to Babe (1995). The film was co-written, co-produced and directed by George Miller, the original film's co-writer and co-producer, and features Magda Szubanski and James Cromwell reprising their roles, with Mary Stein and Mickey Rooney joining the cast.

Babe: Pig in the City was released by Universal Pictures in the United States on 25 November 1998 and in Australia on 10 December 1998. The film was nominated for Best Original Song at the 71st Academy Awards. On initial release, the film received mixed reviews from critics and failed to match the financial success of its predecessor, grossing $69.1 million on a $90 million budget. However, it has developed a cult following and a positive critical reassessment since its release.

== Plot ==
A few weeks following Babe's success at the sheepdog trials, (Note: As depicted in Babe (1995).) Farmer Arthur Hoggett is injured in an accident when the duo attempt to repair Hoggett Farm's pump, leaving his wife, Esme, to tend the farm alone. Soon threatened with eviction at the end of the month unless their mortgage is paid, Esme recovers an offer from a concluding state fair they recently received where Babe can demonstrate sheep herding for enough money, prompting her to leave with him for it. At an San Francisco International Airport in the city of San Francisco, an overzealous detection dog shows Babe what it is like to be rewarded for doing a good job by falsely signaling that he and Esme are carrying drugs, causing them to miss their connecting flight and forcing a few days-wait for the next one home.

At first unable to find a hotel that allows animals, the duo find accommodation at the Flealands Hotel run by the sympathetic Miss Floom, who shelters stray animals. There, Babe meets a trio of chimpanzees consisting of Bob, his pregnant wife Zootie and his younger brother Easy and Thelonius, a civilized Bornean orangutan who is a servant for Floom's elderly uncle, Fugly. Babe is made part of their clown act, in which he is reluctant to appear until the apes insinuate that he will be paid, believing that it could be vital in saving the farm, but he soon inadvertently causes the act to end in disaster. At the same time, Esme, after being tricked by Fugly into believing that Babe has escaped, searches for him, only to be wrongfully arrested following an incident involving police officers and other bystanders when a gang of motorcyclists attempt to mug her.

The next day, Fugly is taken to the hospital in a food coma, accompanied by his niece. Left to fend for themselves, the chimps decide to illegally obtain some sustenance nearby, using Babe to distract a pair of guard dogs; he ultimately rescues one of the dogs after the latter nearly drowns in a canal, who then pledges to act as a bodyguard for Babe to express his gratitude. Around that time, a number of stray animals arrive and Babe offers them shelter in the hotel, before helping provide for them all with what the chimps stole. Having flown all the way to Metropolis, Babe's best friend Ferdinand arrives at the hotel and reunites with him after Zootie gives birth to twins. The celebration is interrupted when several hostile animal control officials are summoned there by the Flooms' animal-hating neighbor, Hortense.

Most of the animals, except for Babe, Ferdinand, the Flooms' Panamanian white-faced capuchin Tug and disabled Jack Russell Terrier Flealick, are confiscated. The quartet infiltrate the animal control facility and rescue their incarcerated friends. Released from custody, Esme returns to the hotel to find it in disarray and Floom mourning her uncle and the animals' capture. After confronting Hortense, the duo locate the animals at a fundraising event and, after a dramatic fight with staff members, manage to reclaim them. Afterwards, Floom sells the hotel and gives the proceeds to Esme so she can save the farm, where Floom and most of the animals go to stay. As Esme resumes her duties and Hoggett finally repairs the pump following his recovery, the latter proudly smiles at Babe and says, "That'll do, Pig. That'll do.".

== Cast ==
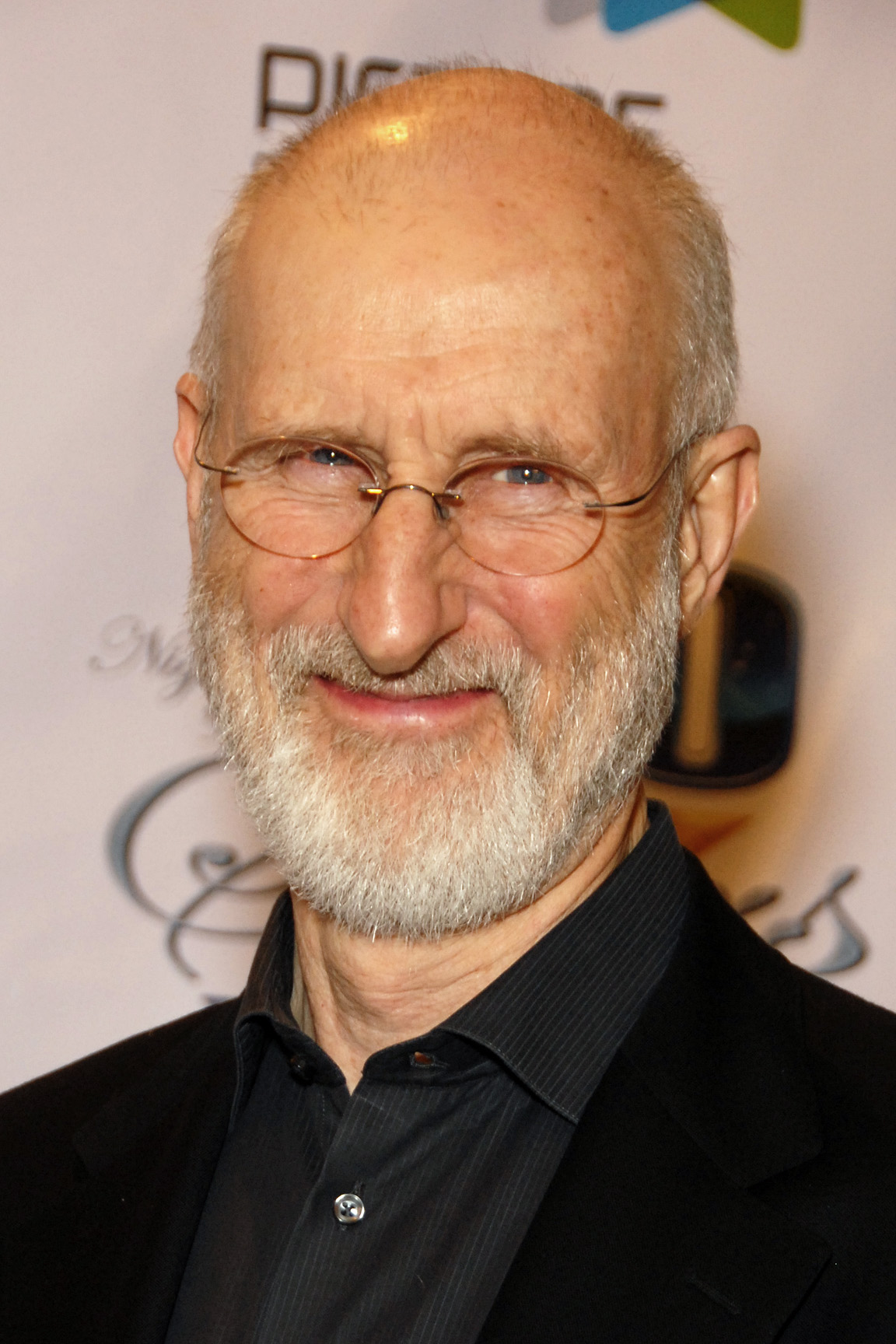
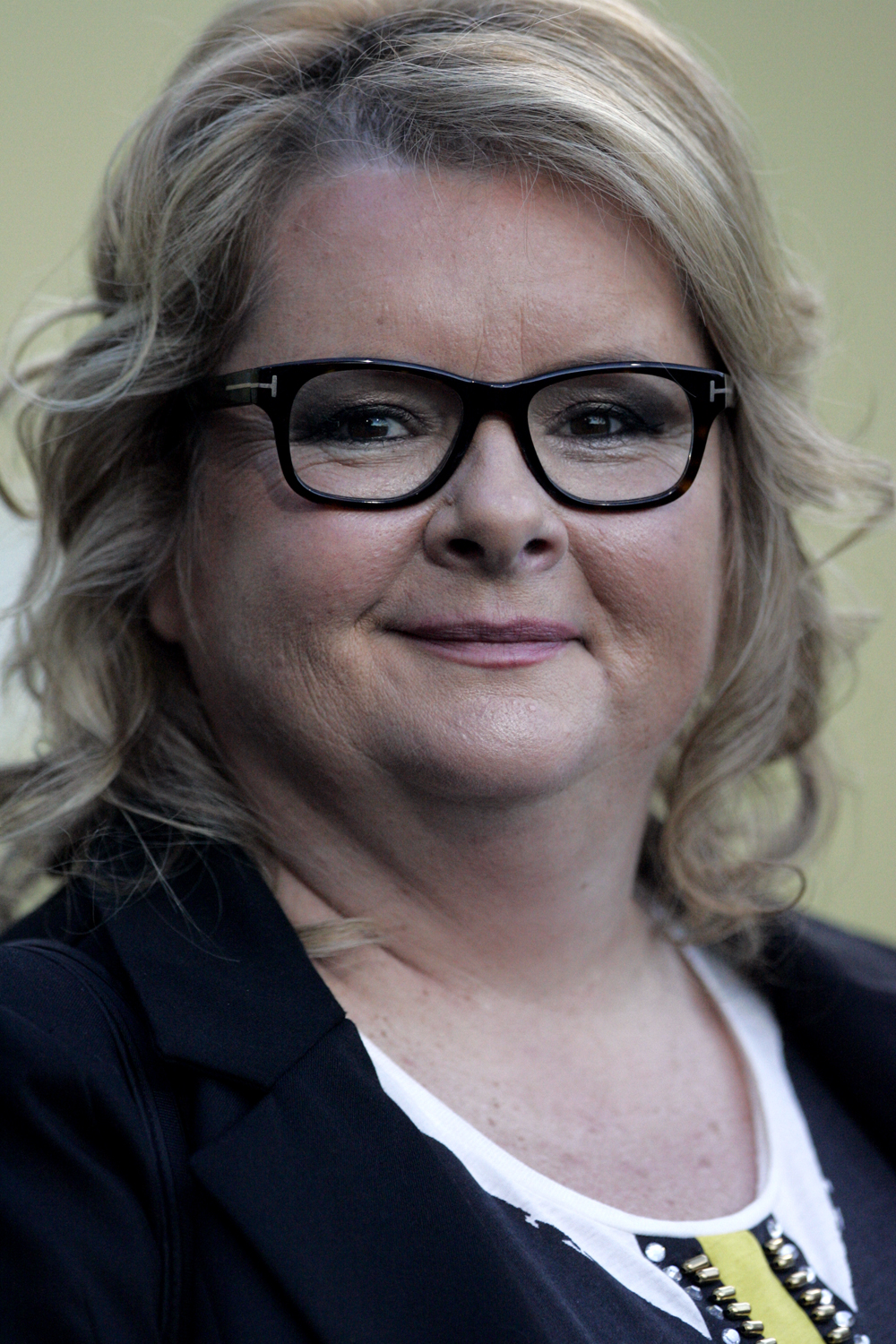
(Left-to-Right) James Cromwell (pictured in 2010), and Magda Szubanski (2013) portrayed Arthur and Esme Hoggett, respectively.
- Magda Szubanski as Esme Cordelia Hoggett, Farmer Hoggett's wife.
- Mickey Rooney as Fugly Floom, Miss Floom's uncle.
- Mary Stein as Miss Floom, the Flealands Hotel's landlady and Fugly's niece.
- Julie Godfrey as Hortense, the Flooms' animal-hating neighbor.
- Janet Foye and Pamela Hawkins as Esme's friends.
- James Cromwell as Farmer Arthur Hoggett, Esme's husband.
- Paul Livingston as a chef at a fundraising event where the film's climax takes place
- Kim Story as the judge at Metropolis' local courthouse
- Jennifer Kent as the laboratory technician at Metropolis' local animal control facility
- John Upton as a sick boy at Metropolis' local hospital

=== Voices ===
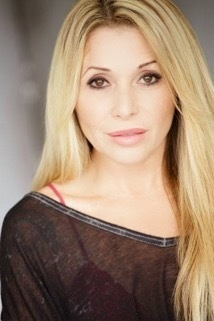
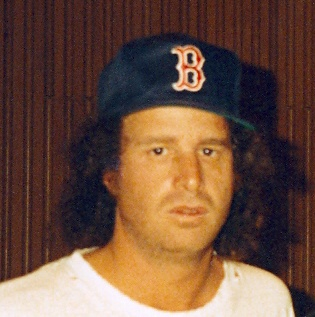
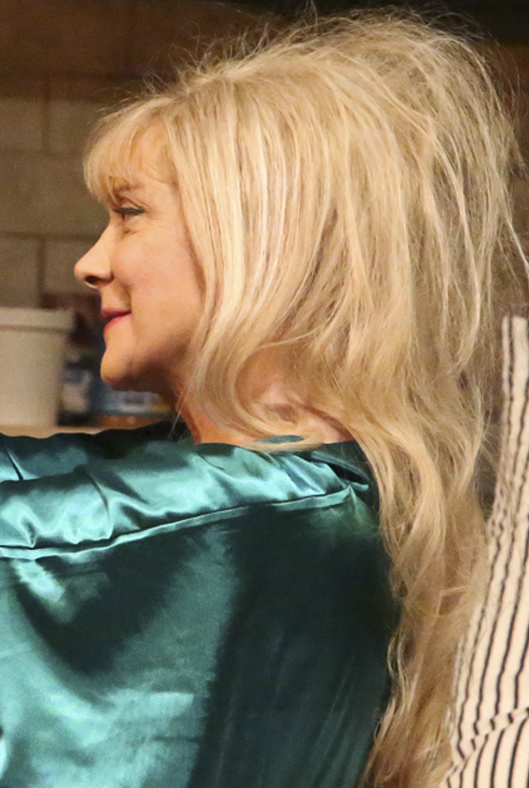
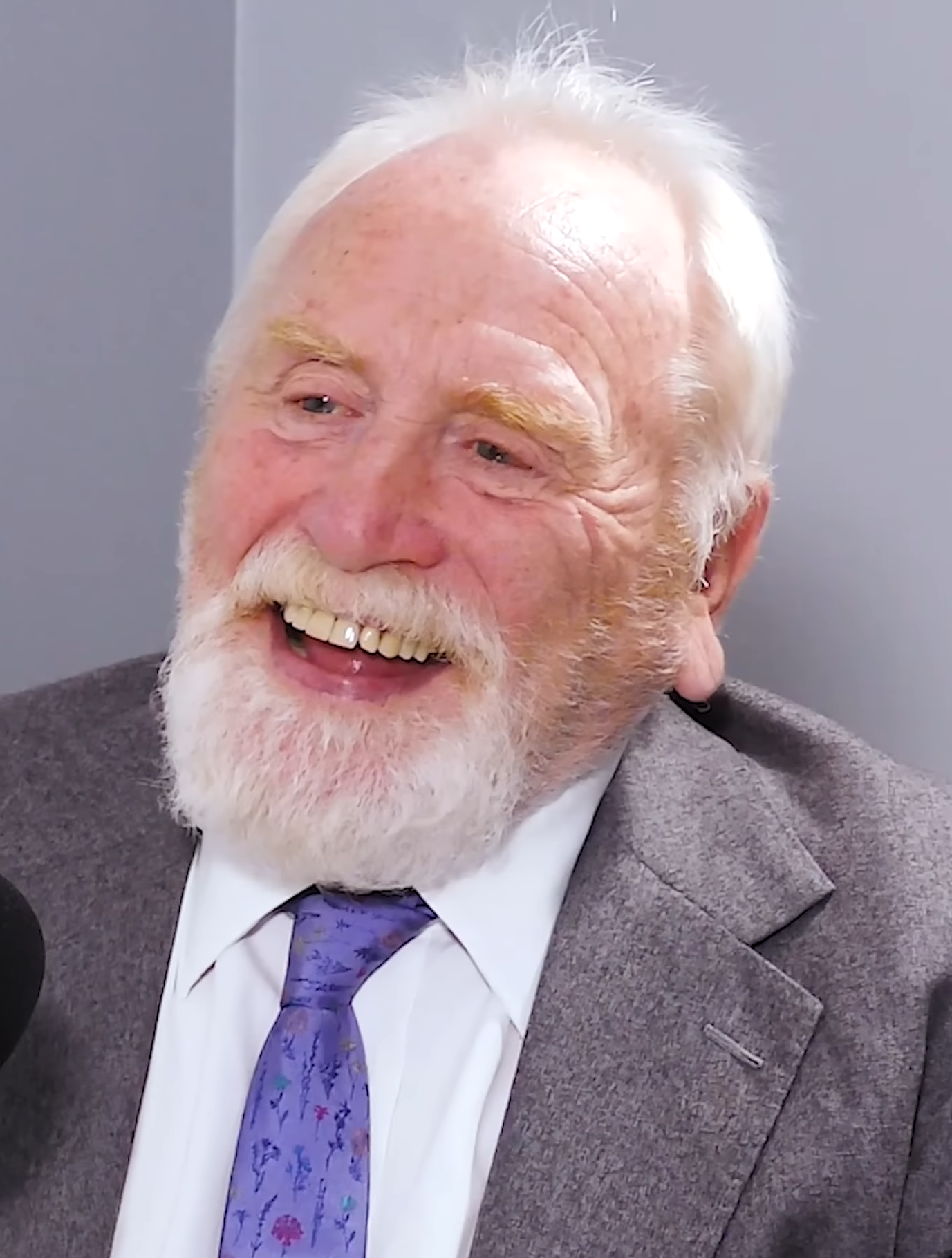
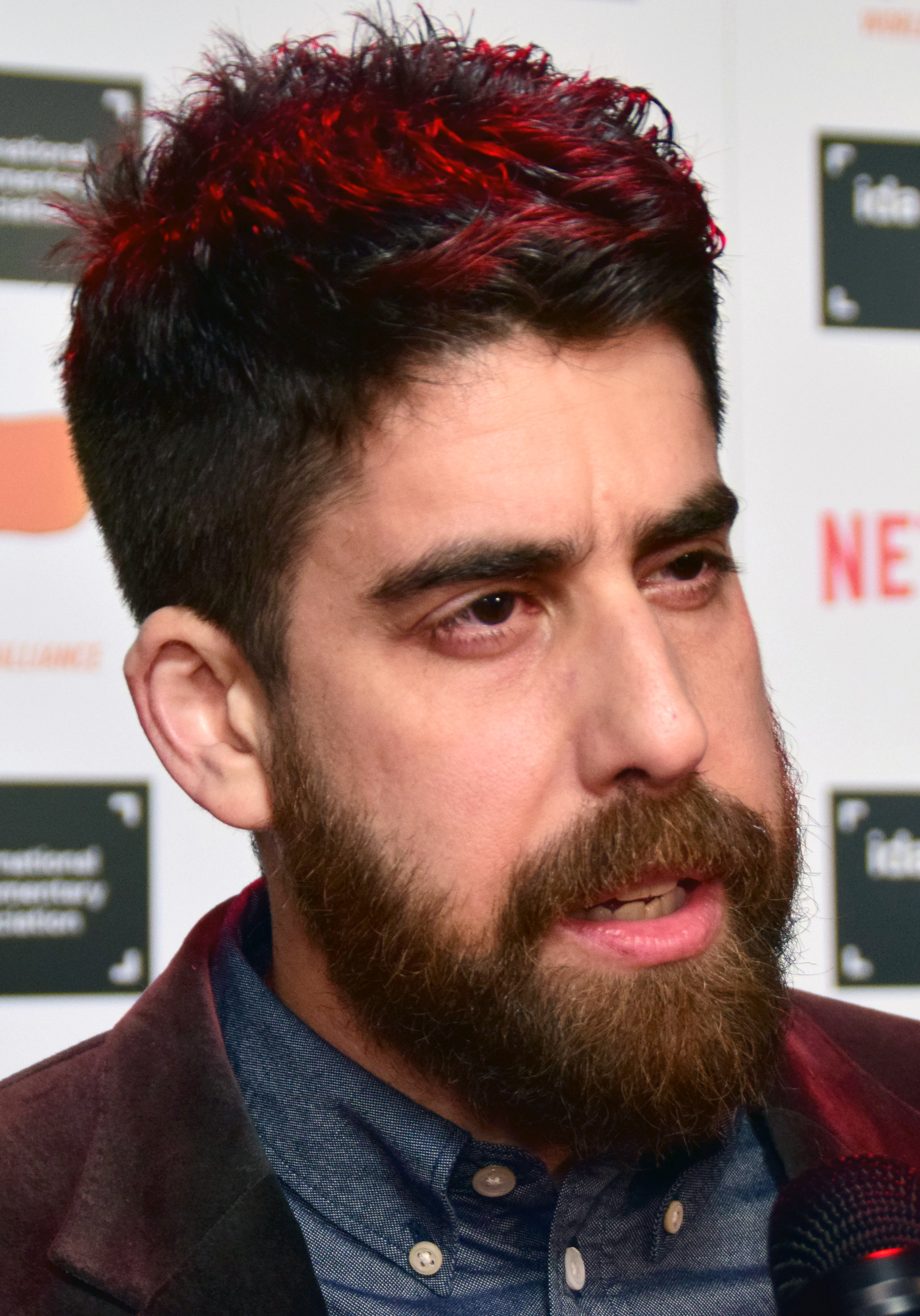
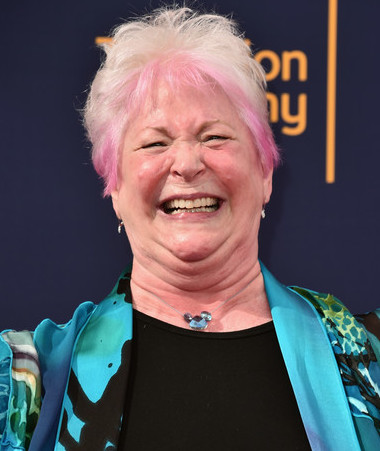
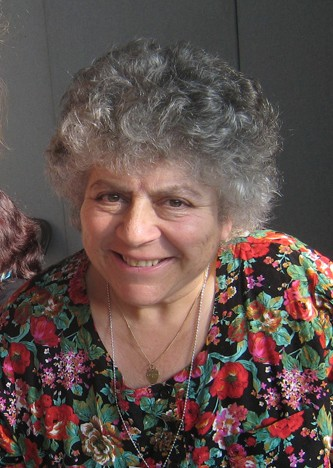
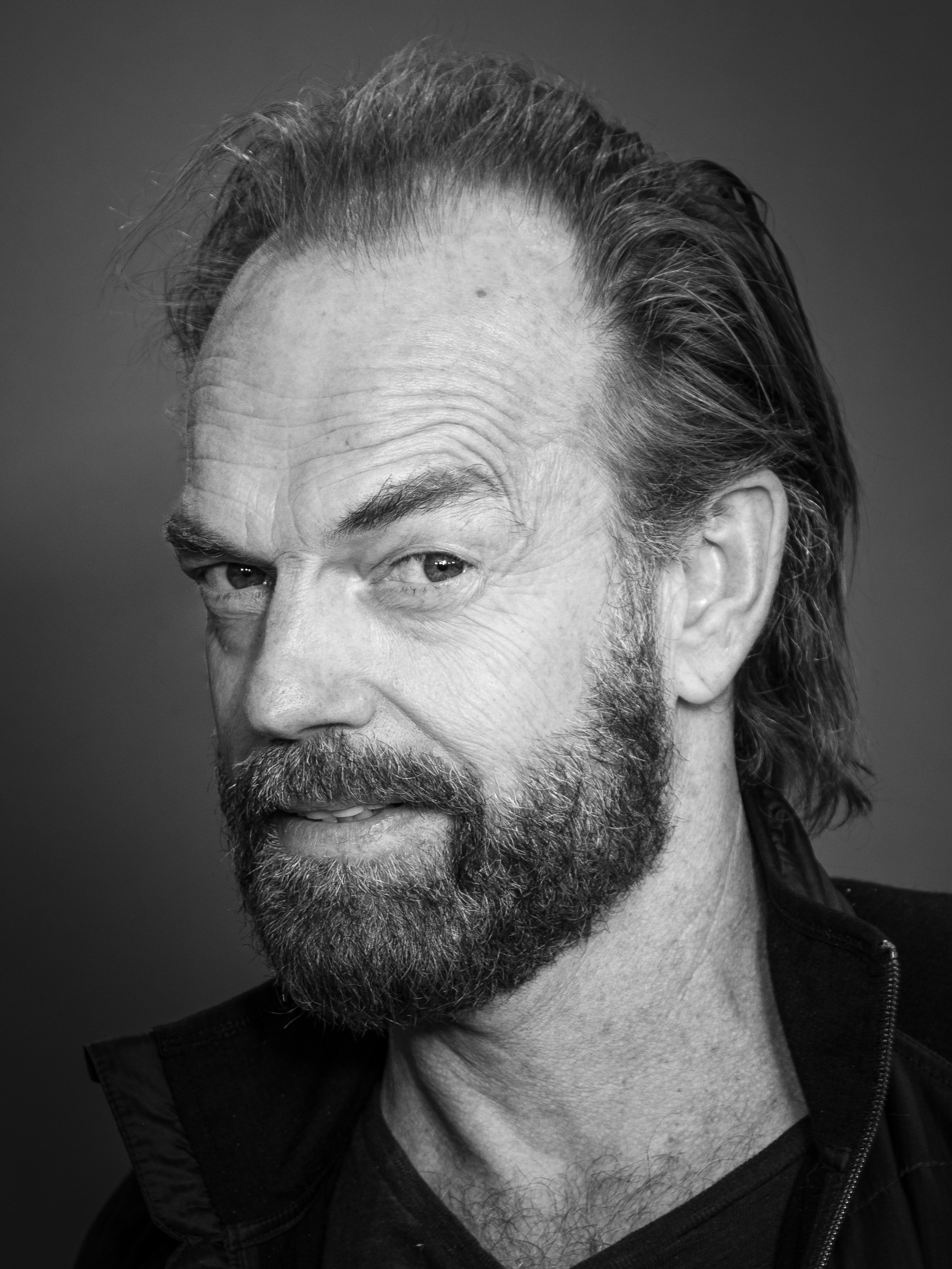
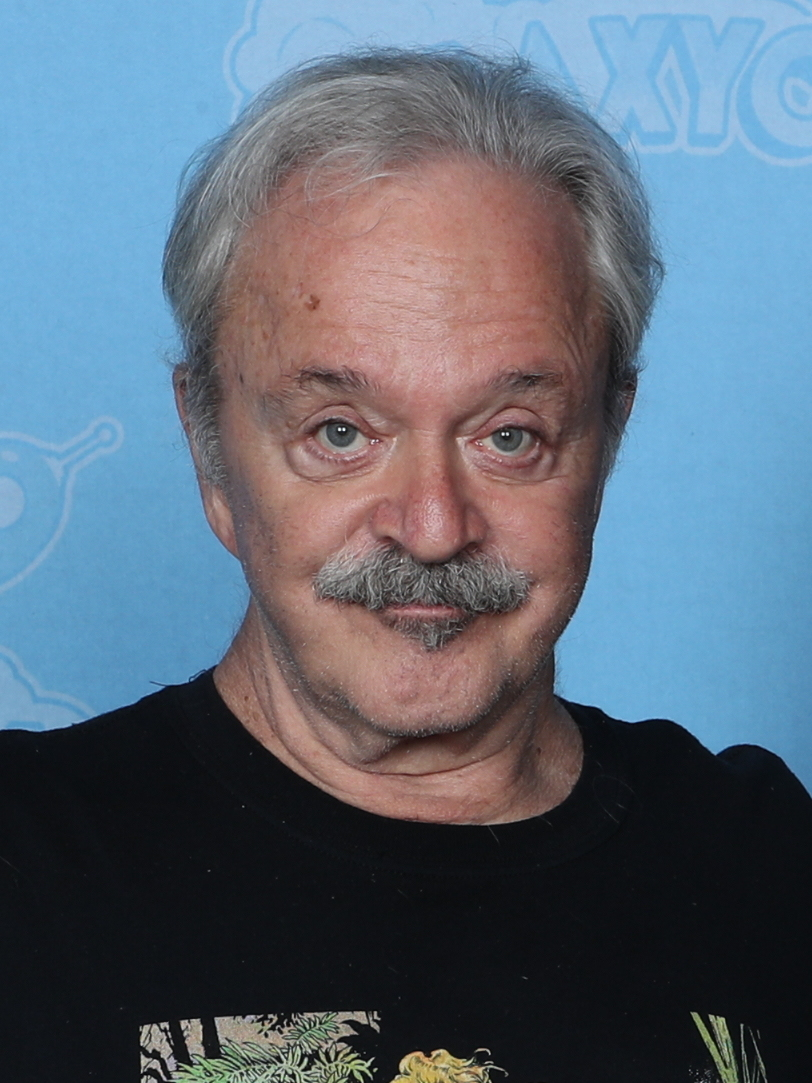
Top: E. G. Daily (pictured in 2018), Steven Wright (1994) and Glenne Headly (2016) provided the voices of Babe, Bob and Zootie, respectively.

Middle: James Cosmo (2023), Adam Goldberg (2015) and Russi Taylor (2018) provided the voices of Thelonius, Flealick and the poodle, respectively.

Bottom: Miriam Margolyes (2008), Hugo Weaving (2018) and Jim Cummings (2021) provided the voices of Fly, Rex and the pelican, respectively.
- E. G. Daily as Babe, Hoggett Farm's resident "sheep-pig" who is Fly and Rex's adoptive son. He was previously voiced by Christine Cavanaugh in the first film.
- Steven Wright as Bob, one of the Flooms' chimpanzees who is Zootie's husband and Easy's elder brother.
- Glenne Headly as Zootie, one of the Flooms' chimpanzees who is Bob's wife and Easy's sister-in-law.
- James Cosmo as Thelonius, a civilized Bornean orangutan who is a servant to Fugly and later Esme in the film's epilogue.
- Myles Jeffrey and Nathan Kress as Easy, one of the Flooms' chimpanzees who is Bob's younger brother and Zootie's brother-in-law.
  - The latter additionally portrayed a stray puppy.
- Adam Goldberg as Flealick, a talkative disabled Jack Russell Terrier residing at the Flealands Hotel.
- Danny Mann as:
  - Ferdinand, an Indian Runner duck and Babe's best friend.
  - The vocal effects of Tug, the Flooms' Panamanian white-faced capuchin.
- Stanley Ralph Ross as an aggressive Bull Terrier and Doberman Pinscher guard dog duo, the former of whom reforms and acts as a bodyguard for Babe to express his gratitude for saving his life.
- Russi Taylor as:
  - A stray poodle who later becomes the Bull Terrier's ex-wife.
  - One of the cats residing at the Flealands Hotel.
- Eddie Barth as:
  - Nigel, a Bulldog residing at the Flealands Hotel.
  - Alan, a Neapolitan Mastiff who is Nigel's roommate.
- Bill Capizzi as Snoop, an overzealous beagle employed at Metropolis' local airport as a detection dog.
- Miriam Margolyes as Fly, a Border Collie who is Rex's wife and Babe's adoptive mother.
- Hugo Weaving as Rex, another Border Collie who is Hoggett Farm's lead sheepdog, as well as the leader of its community, Fly's husband and Babe's adoptive father.
- Jim Cummings as a pelican who assists Ferdinand during his journey to Metropolis.
- Katie Leigh as a stray kitten.
- Evelyn Krape as:
  - The Hoggetts' sheep.
  - Some of Metropolis' local alley cats.
- Charles Bartlett as the Hoggetts' cow.
- Michael Edward-Stevens as the Hoggetts' horse.
- Al Mancini and Larry Moss as Thelonius' goldfish.
- Roscoe Lee Browne as the narrator.

Additional character voices were provided by Lisa Bailey, Balyne Barbosa, Victor Brandt, Jeannie Elias, Pippa Grandison, J. D. Hall, Mark Hammond, Barbara Harris, Wendy Kamenoff, Scott Leavenworthy, Julie Oppenheimer, Deborah Packer, Roger Rose, Carly Schroeder, Joseph Sicari, Aaron Spann, Drew Lexi Thomas and Naomi Watts.

== Production ==
Christine Cavanaugh, who played Babe in the first film, was approached to reprise her role, but declined when contract negotiations fell through. Cavanaugh was eventually replaced by her Rugrats co-star E. G. Daily. The director of the first film, Chris Noonan, had no involvement in the sequel; directorial duties were handled by George Miller and Noonan was reportedly not invited to the premiere Australian screening.

Prior to the film's theatrical release, it was originally rated PG by the MPAA. The TV spots for the film's theatrical release mentioned this rating, as did a promotional poster. By the time the film was released in theaters, it had been re-submitted, seeking a G due to the film being re-edited and re-submitted for review.

Babe: Pig in the City takes place in an imaginative and fantasy-like San Francisco The city has numerous styles of architecture from around the world and also a variety of waterways, noticeable by the hotel at which Babe stays. The downtown area appears to be situated on an island not dissimilar to Treasure Island, and its skyline features numerous landmarks such as the Pier 39, the Golden Gate Bridge, among others.

The home video covers feature a similar but altered interpretation of San Francisco, with a yellow bricks road.

== Reception ==
=== Box office ===
Babe: Pig in the City opened on November 25, 1998, during Thanksgiving weekend, ranking in fifth place behind A Bug's Life, The Rugrats Movie, Enemy of the State and The Waterboy. The film made $6.4 million during its opening weekend, for a total of $8.5 million from its first five days of release.

=== Critical response ===
On Rotten Tomatoes, the film has 67% approval rating based on 64 reviews, with a weighted average of 6.34/10. The site's consensus states that the film is "not quite as good as the original and has some dark subject matter that might not be appropriate for children". Audiences surveyed by CinemaScore gave the film a grade "B" on scale of A+ to F. On Metacritic, the film carries a score of 68, based on 25 reviews, indicating "generally favorable" reviews.

Empire's Andrew Collins said, "Where Babe brought deep-rooted joy, the sequel brings fidgety depression," and awarded the film one star.

Janet Maslin of The New York Times said, "It will work as a sequel only hard-core Babe fans willing to follow this four-legged hero (or heroine, as Babe obviously is in some scenes) anywhere. Had Pig in the City been made first, it by no means could have prompted a sequel of its own."

American film critic Gene Siskel of the Chicago Tribune named it as his choice for the best movie of 1998.

Roger Ebert of the Chicago Sun-Times gave the film four stars out of four, and said that it was even better than the original. "Babe was a movie where everything led up to the big sheepherding contest. Babe: Pig in the City is not so plot-bound, although it has the required assortment of villains, chases and close calls. It is more of a wonderment, lolling in its enchanting images-- original, delightful, and funny." He concluded: "I liked Babe for all the usual reasons, but I like Babe: Pig in the City more, and not for any of the usual reasons, because here is a movie utterly bereft of usual reasons." It made Ebert's list of the best films of the year.

Pat Graham of the Chicago Reader said that it "may be the best commercial film of 1998".

In the decades since Babe: Pig in the City's release, the movie has developed a cult following. Tom Waits expressed appreciation for the film during a 2010 interview with Mojo Magazine. Waits told The Guardian: "You know what one of my favourite movies of all time is? And if I'm at home with my kids and say, 'What do you want to see?', the big joke is, 'Aw Dad! Not Pig in the City!' But I love that movie. I'd see that any time."

Radio personality and podcaster Jesse Thorn has also praised the film. Luke Buckmaster of The Guardian called it "brilliant" and "underrated".

== Awards ==
Peter Gabriel's "That'll Do", written and composed by Randy Newman, was nominated for Best Original Song at the 71st Academy Awards.

== Soundtrack ==
The musical score for Babe: Pig in the City was composed by Nigel Westlake, who previously wrote the music for Babe. A soundtrack album was released on November 24, 1998, by Geffen Records featuring Westlake's score, music inspired by the movie, as well as sound clips taken from film. The soundtrack also includes source music such as "Chattanooga Choo Choo" by Glenn Miller and "That's Amore" by Dean Martin. Additional tracks include the Academy Award-nominated theme song "That'll Do" and a song sung by E. G. Daily, the voice of Babe.

No.	Title	Artist	Length
1.	"That'll Do"	Peter Gabriel Featuring Paddy Maloney* And The Black Dyke Band	3:53
2.	"Babe: A Pig In The City"	Melbourne Symphony Orchestra	1:22
3.	"The Returning Hero"	Melbourne Symphony Orchestra	1:16
4.	"Non, Je Ne Regrette Rien"	Edith Piaf	2:19
5.	"Chattanooga Choo-Choo"	Glenn Miller & His Orchestra* With Tex Beneke & The Modernaires With Unknown Artist	3:14
6.	"Scram, This Is Not A Farm!"	Melbourne Symphony Orchestra	2:27
7.	"That's Amore"	Dean Martin	3:07
8.	"Three Blind Mice"	Unknown Artist	0:42
9.	"A Pig Gets Wise"	Melbourne Symphony Orchestra	1:17
10.	"Are You Lonesome Tonight"	The Mavericks	3:00
11.	"Protected By Angels"	The Chieftains Featuring The Black Dyke Mills Band	3:39
12.	"The Big City (Two Step Nadya)"	The Terem Quartet*	3:12
13.	"Babe's Lament"	Melbourne Symphony Orchestra	2:38
14.	"A Heart That's True"	E.G. Daily	4:00
15.	"The End"	Melbourne Symphony Orchestra	1:26
16.	"That'll Do (Instrumental)"	James Watson And The Black Dyke Mills Band	4:00

== Home media ==
The film has been released on VHS, DVD (in both widescreen and pan and scan formats), and laserdisc on May 4, 1999. On May 22, 2001, the film was released on DVD as a 2-disc set with the original Babe. On September 23, 2003, it was re-released on DVD as part of The Complete Adventure Two-Movie Pig Pack in its separate widescreen and pan-and-scan formats. On December 16, 2025, Babe and Babe: Pig in the City received a 4K release from Kino Lorber using a new scan of the original 35mm camera negative, presented in its original aspect ratio of 1.85:1 anamorphic widescreen.

== Video game ==
In 2006, a universally-panned video game adaptation of the film was released on PlayStation 2.
