= River Kings =

River Kings can refer to:

== Sports ==
- Cedar Rapids River Kings, a professional indoor American football team based in Cedar Rapids, Iowa, United States
- Cornwall River Kings, a former professional ice hockey team based in Cornwall, Ontario, Canada
- Mississippi RiverKings, a former professional minor league ice hockey team in Southaven, Mississippi, United States, formerly known as Memphis Riverkings
- River Kings, the male athletic teams of Clinton High School in Clinton, Iowa, United States

== Culture ==
- The River Kings, a novel by Max Fatchen, a South Australian children's writer and journalist.
- The River Kings, a 1991 Australian mini series based on the novels The River Kings and Conquest of the River
