= Babe and Friends =

1999 video game

- Developer: Aqua Pacific Ltd.
- Producers: Crave Entertainment; David A. Palmer Productions
- Platform: Game Boy Color
- Release: NA: November 16, 1999; EU: 1999
- Genre: Puzzle
- Mode: Single-player

Babe and Friends is a 1999 Game Boy Color game developed by Aqua Pacific Ltd, based upon the 1995 film Babe.

== Gameplay ==
A screenshot of Babe and Friends depicting the top-down puzzle gameplay.

Babe and Friends is a puzzle game played in top-down perspective. The player guides Babe through 40 stages across five levels and leads a herd of sheep around obstacles, which must be positioned or manipulated in order to create a clear path. The game begins on a farm, but levels change the environment, each with their own distinctive obstacles, such as airports featuring carts and escalators. The game is also backwards compatible with previous Game Boy units, including the Pocket Game Boy and Super Game Boy.

== Reception ==
Reception

Review scores
Publication	Score
AllGame	3/5
GameSpot	7/10
Hyper	7/10
IGN	7/10
Game Boy Official Magazine	62%
Total Game Boy	70%
Game Station	7/10
Game Boy Xtreme	62%

Reviews for Babe and Friends were mediocre. Critics praised the difficulty and learning curve of the puzzles. Kyle Knight of Allgame praised the "well-designed puzzles" and "graduated difficulty curve" of the game as "amongst the best in the business", with "each puzzle...more challenging and more intriguing than the last". Critics noted the limited playtime and variety featured in the game. Hyper noted "the keen puzzle fan will finish this one off in a flash". Craig Harris of IGN praised the "complex patterns" of the puzzles, but noted "it's obvious this game is aimed at the younger crowd...it really only took me an hour to get halfway through the game".
