= Jay Friedkin =

- Occupation: film editor
- Years active: 1980–Present

Jay Friedkin is a film editor who was nominated at the 1995 Academy Awards for Best Film Editing for his work on Babe. He shared the nomination with Marcus D'Arcy.

In addition, he was nominated for the BAFTA Award for Best Editing for Babe as well during the 49th British Academy Film Awards.

== Filmography ==
- Code 3 (2024)
- Violet (2021)
- The Animal Condition (2013) (graphics execution)
- Pathfinder (2007)
- Frankenstein (2004)
- Babe: Pig in the City (1998)
- Tricks (1997)
- Dating the Enemy (1996) (Special thanks)
- Babe (1995)
- Ordinary People (1980) (apprentice editor)
