= Scott E. Anderson =

American special effects artist (born 1964)

- Born: April 1, 1964 (age 62); Cortland, New York, USA
- Occupation: Visual effects artist
- Years active: 1989-present

Scott E. Anderson (born April 1, 1964), is an Academy Award winning visual effects supervisor and filmmaker. He has been nominated for the Academy Award three times (Babe, Starship Troopers, Hollow Man), and received the Oscar for Babe. A longstanding member of the visual effects community, he was an early leader and key contributor to the Oscar winning films The Abyss, Terminator 2: Judgment Day, and King Kong.

He studied film, semiotics and computer science and graduated with an Sc.B. from Brown University. While at Brown he was a member of the Brown Computer Graphics Group studying under Andries van Dam and was a varsity wrestler and four-time captain of the Brown Wrestling Team.

Anderson is a member of the Directors Guild of America (DGA) and the Visual Effects Society (VES).

== Oscar history ==
All of these are in the category of Best Visual Effects.

- 68th Academy Awards-Babe. Award shared with John Cox, Charles Gibson, and Neal Scanlan. Won.
- 70th Academy Awards-Nominated for Starship Troopers. Nomination shared with Alec Gillis, John Richardson and Phil Tippett. Lost to Titanic.
- 73rd Academy Awards-Nominated for Hollow Man. Nomination shared with Craig Hayes, Stan Parks and Scott Stokdyk, lost to Gladiator.
