= Feeling Sexy =

- Directed by: Davida Allen
- Produced by: Chris Noonan; Glenys Rowe
- Starring: Susie Porter; Tamblyn Lord
- Release date: 1999
- Running time: 50 minutes
- Country: Australia
- Language: English
- Box office: A$475,000 (Australia)

Feeling Sexy is a 1999 Australian short feature from artist Davida Allen.

Davida Allen later described the film as:

A lovely plum pudding story. It's not out there with a big sign saying that this is the answer. But like all stories you can just get a little taste of 'we could do that'. There's hope and, as a Catholic, I feel that there is hope and I want to tell stories that say there is hope. It's a love story unlike the Hollywood stories which say move on; it's not working here so move on. Feeling Sexy is not a kind of Bible story that says, 'Drat it, this is going to be hard work'. It's just a different angle at looking at a universal situation. It's a celebration of monogamy. It's very similar to a seed which, unless it's watered, dies.

== Cast ==
- Susie Porter as Vicki
- Tamblyn Lord
