= Babe (film) =

1995 film by Chris Noonan

- Theatrical release poster
- Directed by: Chris Noonan
- Screenplay by: George Miller; Chris Noonan
- Based on: The Sheep-Pig by Dick King-Smith
- Produced by: Bill Miller; George Miller; Doug Mitchell
- Starring: James Cromwell; Magda Szubanski
- Cinematography: Andrew Lesnie
- Edited by: Marcus D'Arcy; Jay Friedkin
- Music by: Nigel Westlake
- Production company: Kennedy Miller Productions
- Distributed by: Universal Pictures (United States); United International Pictures (International)
- Release dates: August 4, 1995 (United States); December 14, 1995 (Australia); December 15, 1995 (United Kingdom)
- Running time: 92 minutes
- Countries: Australia; United States; United Kingdom
- Language: English
- Budget: $30 million
- Box office: $254.1 million

Babe is a 1995 comedy-drama film directed by Chris Noonan, who co-wrote it with George Miller. It is an adaptation of Dick King-Smith's 1983 novel The Sheep-Pig, which tells the story of a farm pig who wants to do the work of a sheepdog. The film is narrated by Roscoe Lee Browne and the main animal characters are played by both real animals and animatronic puppets.

Babe was filmed in Robertson, New South Wales, Australia, in 1994 and released theatrically by Universal Pictures in the United States and Canada on August 4, 1995, with United International Pictures releasing in other territories, going on to become a critical and commercial success with seven Academy Award nominations, including Best Director and Best Picture.

A sequel, Babe: Pig in the City, was released in 1998, with most of the starring actors reprising their roles. It did not receive the same critical or commercial success as the original.

== Plot ==
Following his usage in a "guess the weight" contest at an agricultural show, orphaned piglet Babe is brought home to the farm of the contest winner, Arthur Hoggett. There, he is taken in by Border Collie Fly, her irascible husband Rex and their puppies and befriends a duck named Ferdinand, who wakes people by crowing like a rooster every morning so he will be considered useful and be spared from being eaten.

Dismayed when the Hoggetts buy an alarm clock, Ferdinand persuades Babe to help him get rid of it. In doing so, they wake Duchess, the Hoggetts' cat, and wreck the house in the ensuing chaos. Rex sternly instructs Babe to stay away from Ferdinand and the house. Seeing Fly saddened when her puppies are put up for sale, Babe lets her adopt him. With the Hoggetts' relatives visiting for Christmas, Hoggett decides against choosing Babe for Christmas dinner and tells his wife Esme that Babe may bring a prize for ham at the next agricultural show. Ferdinand's love interest Rosanna is served instead, prompting Ferdinand to escape the farm. Babe investigates the fields, where he witnesses a pair of sheep rustlers stealing Hoggett's sheep and quickly alerts Fly and Hoggett, preventing the rustlers from taking them all.

Impressed after seeing Babe sort hens, separating the brown from the white ones, Hoggett takes him to try and herd the sheep. Encouraged by the elderly Maa, Babe gets the sheep to cooperate by asking nicely, but Rex perceives Babe's actions as an insult to sheepdogs. When Fly stands up for Babe, Rex attacks and injures her and bites Hoggett's hand when he tries to intervene. Rex is subsequently chained to the dog house and sedated, leaving the sheep herding job to Babe. One morning, Babe scares off a trio of feral dogs attacking the sheep, but Maa is mortally injured and dies as a result. Hoggett, thinking Babe was responsible, attempts to shoot him dead, but Fly finds out the truth from the other sheep and distracts Hoggett long enough for Esme to inform him about the dogs' attack on a neighbouring farm.

When Esme leaves on a trip, Hoggett signs Babe up for sheepdog trials. As it is raining the night before, Hoggett lets him and Fly into the house, where he is scratched by Duchess, who in turn is temporarily confined outside as punishment. When she is let back in later, she gets back at Babe by revealing that humans consume pigs. After learning from Fly that this is true, Babe runs away and Rex finds him the next morning in a cemetery. Hoggett brings a demoralised Babe home, where he refuses to eat. After Hoggett sings "If I Had Words" and dances a jig for him, Babe's faith in his affection is restored.

At the trials, Babe meets the sheep that he will be herding, but they ignore his attempts to speak to them. As Hoggett is criticised by the bewildered judges and ridiculed by the public for not using a dog, Rex runs back to the farm to ask the sheep what to do. After he promises that he will treat them better from now on, the sheep disclose to him a secret password. He returns in time to convey the password to Babe and the sheep now follow his instructions flawlessly. Amid the crowd's acclamation, Babe is unanimously given a perfect score. When Babe sits down next to Hoggett, the latter praises him with the standard command to sheep dogs that their job is done, "That'll do, Pig. That'll do.".

== Cast ==
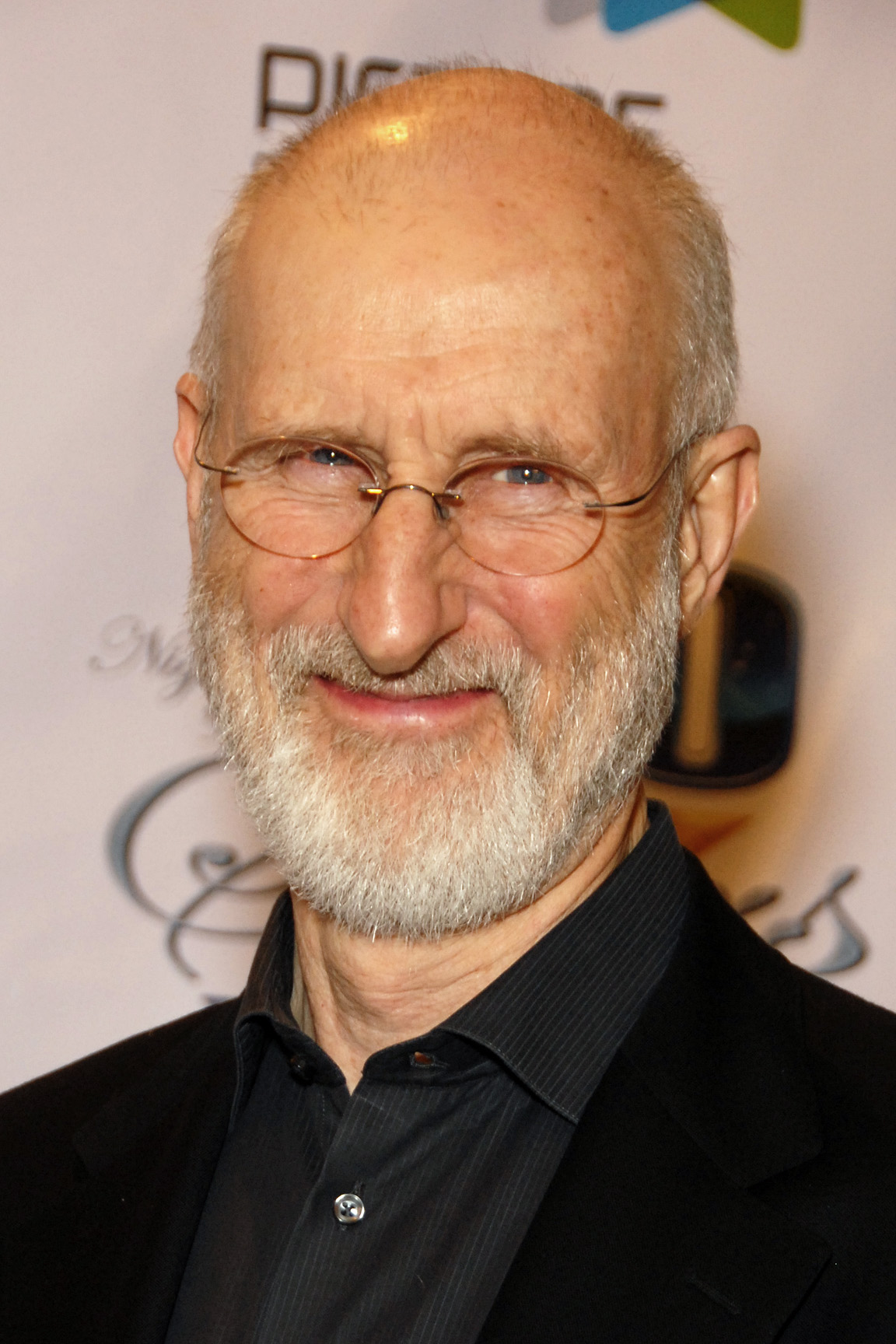
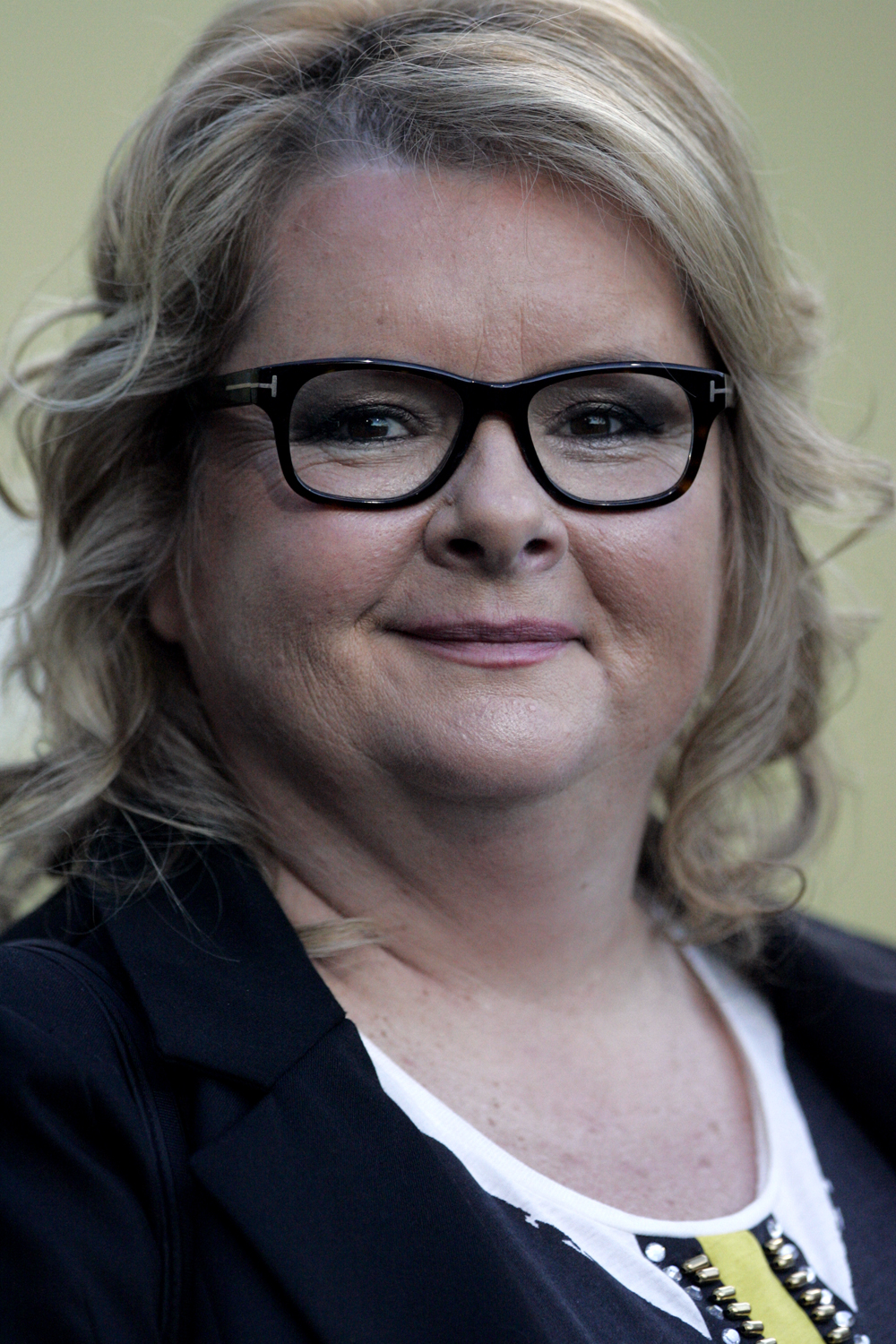
(Left-to-Right) James Cromwell (pictured in 2010), and Magda Szubanski (2013) portrayed Arthur and Esme Hoggett.
- James Cromwell as Farmer Arthur Hoggett
- Magda Szubanski as Esme Hoggett
- Zoe Burton as the Hoggetts' daughter
- Paul Goddard as the Hoggetts' son-in-law
- Wade Hayward as the Hoggetts' grandson
- Brittany Byrnes as the Hoggetts' granddaughter
- Mary Acres as Valda
- Janet Foye, Pamela Hawkins and Karen Gough as some country women
- John Doyle and Mike Harris as television commentators
- John Erwin as another television commentator
- Doris Grau as another country woman
- Marshall Napier as the chairman of the sheepdog trials' judges

=== Voices ===
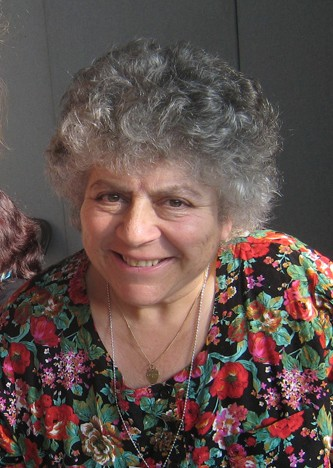
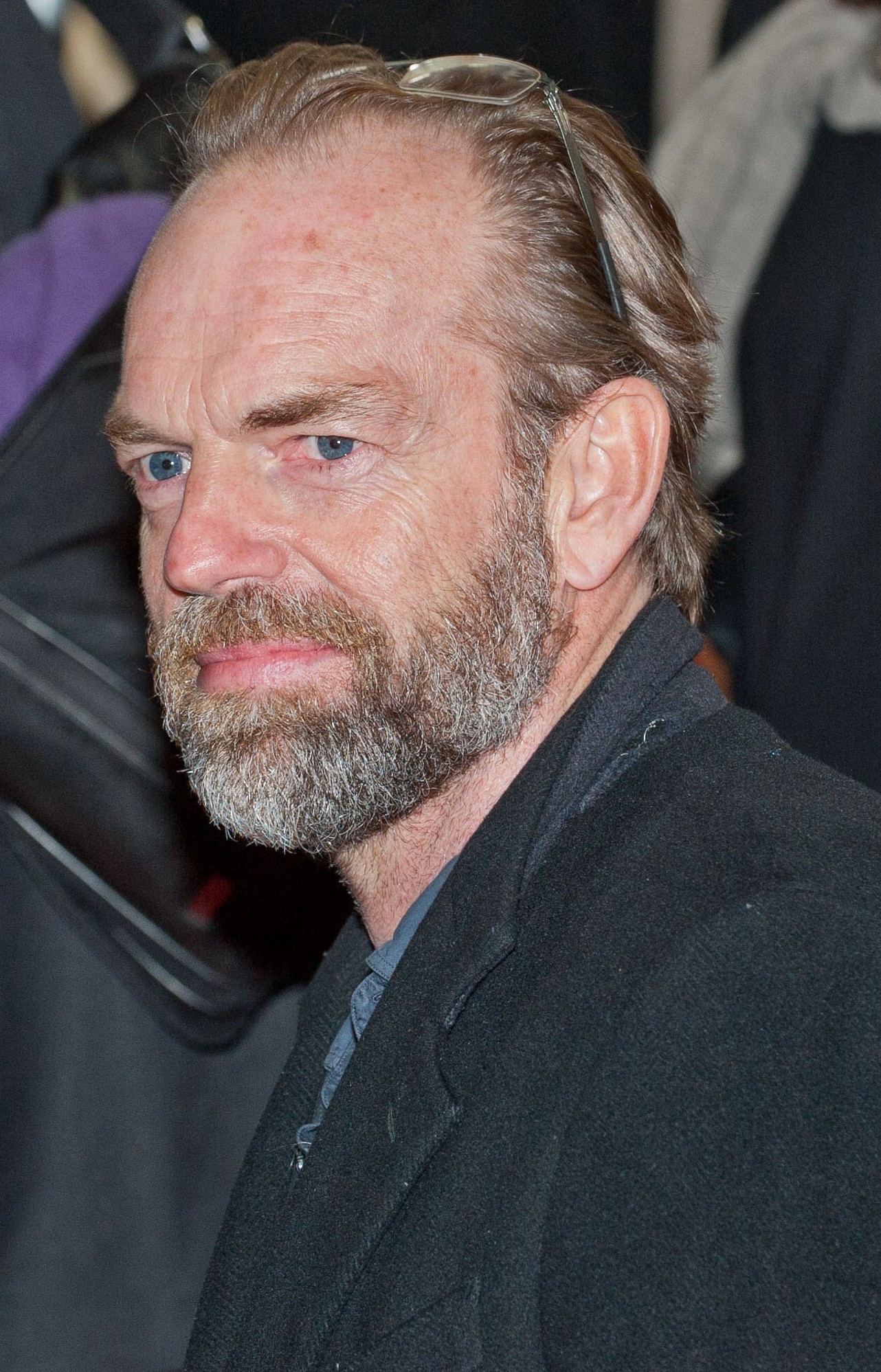
(Left-to-Right) Miriam Margolyes (pictured in 2008) and Hugo Weaving (2014) voiced Fly and Rex.
- Christine Cavanaugh as Babe
- Danny Mann as Ferdinand
- Miriam Margolyes as Fly
- Hugo Weaving as Rex
- Miriam Flynn as Maa
- Russi Taylor as Duchess
- Michael Edward-Stevens as the Hoggetts' horse
- Charles Bartlett as the Hoggetts' cow
- Evelyn Krape as one of the Hoggetts' sheep
- Paul Livingston as the Hoggetts' rooster
- Roscoe Lee Browne as the film's narrator

Fly and Rex's puppies were voiced by Ross Bagley, Gemini Barnett, Rachel Davey, Debi Derryberry, Jazzmine Dillingham, Courtland Mead and Kevin Woods.

The sheep were voiced by Jane Alden, Kimberly Bailey, Patrika Darbo, Michelle Davison, Julie Forsyth, Maeve Germaine, Rosanna Huffman, Carlyle King, Tina Lifford, Genni Nevinson, Linda Phillips, Paige Pollack and Kerry Walker.

The other character voices were provided by Barbara Harris, Jacqueline Brennan, Doug Burch, Tony Hughes, Linda Janssen, Daamen Krall, Charlie MacLean, Justin Monjo, Antonia Murphy, Neil Ross and Scott Vernon.

== Production ==
Babe is an adaptation of Dick King-Smith's 1983 novel The Sheep-Pig, also known as Babe: The Gallant Pig in the US, which tells the story of a pig raised as livestock who wants to do the work of a sheepdog. The main animal characters are played by a combination of real and animatronic pigs and Border Collies. The breed of pig used was a Large White, which grows rapidly. On account of this, 48 piglets of the required size were used during the course of the filming, as well as the animatronic model for visual effects.

The film is divided into six chapters to preserve the storybook-like feel of the original novel (although none of the film's chapters are the same as the book's). The film's mice characters were subsequently added to read the chapter titles aloud after a test screening in which producer George Miller noted that younger audiences had trouble reading them, needing help from the adults.

After seven years of development, Babe was filmed in Robertson, New South Wales, Australia. The talking-animal visual effects were done by Rhythm & Hues Studios (R&H), Animal Logic and Jim Henson's Creature Shop.

According to actor James Cromwell, there was tension on the set between producer George Miller and director Chris Noonan. Noonan later complained, "I don't want to make a lifelong enemy of George Miller but I thought that he tried to take credit for Babe, tried to exclude me from any credit, and it made me very insecure... It was like your guru has told you that you are no good and that is really disconcerting."

Miller shot back, "Chris said something that is defamatory: that I took his name off the credits on internet sites, which is just absolutely untrue. You know, I'm sorry but I really have a lot more to do with my life than worry about that... when it comes to Babe, the vision was handed to Chris on a plate."

Interviewed about the movie in 2020, Cromwell admitted he nearly turned it down, as his character only had about 16 lines. He was persuaded by his friend Charles Keating to take it anyway. Keating told him: "it's a free ticket to Australia, and if the movie tanks, it's not your fault, it's the pig's fault." Cromwell said Noonan wanted him for the part, and won out over Miller, who had wanted to cast an Australian actor. Cromwell's fee was around $50,000. He asked for an increase when he realised the movie was making millions of dollars, but was turned down. Nevertheless, he said "I got a lot out of that film, and it turned my whole life around. I didn't have to audition anymore."

== Music ==
The musical score for Babe was composed by Nigel Westlake and performed by the Melbourne Symphony Orchestra. Classical orchestral music by 19th-century French composers is used throughout the film, but is disguised in a variety of ways and often integrated by Westlake into his score. The theme song "If I Had Words" (lyrics by Jonathan Hodge), sung by Hoggett near the film's conclusion, is an adaptation of the Maestoso final movement of the Organ Symphony by Camille Saint-Saëns, and was originally performed in 1977 by Scott Fitzgerald and Yvonne Keeley. This tune also recurs throughout the film's score.

There are also brief quotations within the score from Edvard Grieg's Lyric Pieces, Op.71 No. 1. Other music featured is by Léo Delibes, Richard Rodgers, Gabriel Fauré, and Georges Bizet.

== Reception ==
Babe was a box office success, grossing A$36.7 million (US$29 million) at the box office in Australia; US$64 million in the United States and Canada; US$34 million in the United Kingdom and over US$254 million worldwide. It was the second highest-grossing Australian film in Australia, behind Crocodile Dundee. It also received critical acclaim and was ultimately nominated for seven Academy Awards, including Best Picture, Best Director, Best Supporting Actor for James Cromwell, Best Screenplay Based on Material Previously Produced or Published, Best Art Direction and Best Film Editing, winning Best Visual Effects. At the APRA Music Awards of 1996 it won Best Film Score for Westlake's work. In 2006, the American Film Institute named Babe #80 on its list of America's Most Inspiring Movies. The February 2020 issue of New York Magazine lists Babe as among "The Best Movies That Lost Best Picture at the Oscars."

On review aggregator website Rotten Tomatoes, the film has an approval rating of 98% based on 122 reviews, with a rating average of 8.4/10. The website's critical consensus reads: "The rare family-friendly feature with a heart as big as its special effects budget, Babe offers timeless entertainment for viewers of all ages." Metacritic gave the film a score of 83 based on 16 reviews, indicating "universal acclaim".

Because of its subject being a piglet, Babe was initially banned from Malaysia in order to avoid upsetting or annoying Muslims (who view pigs as haram). The ruling was overturned almost a year later, and the film was released as a direct-to-video.

When Babe was released in the US, it is reported that "activists around the country staked out movie theaters with flyers documenting the real-life abuses of pigs". The film had a marked effect on the growth of vegetarianism, particularly among the young. It also promoted a more sympathetic view of the intellectual, emotional and social capacities of animals. James Cromwell became an ethical vegetarian as a result of starring as Farmer Hoggett, saying: "I decided that to be able to talk about this [movie] with conviction, I needed to become a vegetarian." In 1996, he went on to organise a vegetarian dinner for the Los Angeles homeless at a "Compassionate Christmas" event in order to reverse the barnyard view that "Christmas is carnage".

== Accolades ==
Award ceremony	Year	Category	Recipient(s)	Result	Ref(s)
Academy Awards	1996	Best Picture	George Miller, Doug Mitchell and Bill Miller	Nominated	
Academy Awards	1996	Best Director	Chris Noonan	Nominated	
Academy Awards	1996	Best Supporting Actor	James Cromwell	Nominated	
Academy Awards	1996	Best Adapted Screenplay	George Miller and Chris Noonan	Nominated	
Academy Awards	1996	Best Art Direction	Art Direction: Roger Ford; Set Decoration: Kerrie Brown	Nominated	
Academy Awards	1996	Best Film Editing	Marcus D'Arcy and Jay Friedkin	Nominated	
Academy Awards	1996	Best Visual Effects	Scott E. Anderson, Charles Gibson, Neal Scanlan and John Cox	Won	
Australasian Performing Right Association Awards	1996	Best Film Score	Nigel Westlake	Won	
Australian Cinematographers Society Awards	1996	Cinematographer of the Year	Andrew Lesnie	Won	
British Academy Film Awards	1996	Best Film	George Miller, Doug Mitchell, Bill Miller and Chris Noonan	Nominated	
British Academy Film Awards	1996	Best Adapted Screenplay	George Miller and Chris Noonan	Nominated	
British Academy Film Awards	1996	Best Editing	Marcus D'Arcy and Jay Friedkin	Nominated	
British Academy Film Awards	1996	Best Special Visual Effects	Scott E. Anderson, Neal Scanlan, John Cox, Chris Chitty and Charles Gibson	Nominated	
British Comedy Awards	1996	Best Comedy Film	Babe	Won	
Chlotrudis Awards	1996	Best Movie	Babe	Nominated	
Chlotrudis Awards	1996	Best Supporting Actor	James Cromwell	Nominated	
Critics' Choice Movie Awards	1996	Best Family Film	Babe	Won	
Film Critics Circle of Australia Awards	1997	Best Director	Chris Noonan	Won	
Film Critics Circle of Australia Awards	1997	Best Original Music	Nigel Westlake	Won	
Golden Globe Awards	1996	Best Motion Picture – Musical or Comedy	George Miller and Doug Mitchell	Won	
London Film Critics' Circle Awards	1996	Film of the Year	Babe	Won	
London Film Critics' Circle Awards	1996	International Newcomer of the Year	Chris Noonan	Won	
National Society of Film Critics Awards	1996	Best Film	Babe	Won	
New York Film Critics Circle Awards	1995	Best New Director	Chris Noonan	Won	
Nickelodeon Kids' Choice Awards	1996	Favorite Animal Star	Babe the Pig	Nominated	
Saturn Awards	1996	Best Fantasy Film	Babe	Won	
Saturn Awards	1996	Best Writing	George Miller and Chris Noonan	Nominated	
Writers Guild of America Awards	1996	Best Adapted Screenplay	George Miller and Chris Noonan	Nominated	

== Video games ==
In 1995, Sound Source Interactive released a video game for Windows, titled Babe: A Little Pig Goes a Long Way. Entertainment Weekly said: "[...] this cozy CD-ROM supplement should score with the young and wired." CNET wrote: "Ultimately, this pig is a bit short on plot. Nonetheless, the disc is well done, and may have enough appeal to make your diehard four-year-old fan squeal." In 1999, Crave Entertainment released a puzzle game for the Game Boy Color titled Babe and Friends.

== Sequel ==
A sequel, Babe: Pig in the City, was released in 1998 by Universal Pictures. It was directed by George Miller, one of the writers and producers of the first film, and actors Magda Szubanski and James Cromwell reprised their roles. The sequel cost $90 million compared to the original film's $30 million, and it grossed $69 million compared to the original's $254 million. It also received weaker reviews than the first, with Rotten Tomatoes reporting that critics finding it "not quite as good as the original".

== See also ==
- Cinema of Australia
