= To Make a Killing =

- DVD cover
- Directed by: Karl Zwicky
- Written by: P. J. Hogan; Karl Zwicky
- Produced by: Charles Hannah; David Hannay
- Starring: Tamblyn Lord; Craig Pearce; Tiffiny Dowe; Kelly Dingwall
- Cinematography: John Stokes
- Edited by: Roy Mason
- Music by: Robert Scott; John Sleith
- Release date: 1988
- Running time: 88 minutes
- Country: Australia
- Language: English
- Budget: A$640,000

To Make a Killing (also known as Vicious and Wild Boys) is a 1988 Australian drama thriller film written and directed by Karl Zwicky and co-written by P. J. Hogan. It stars Tamblyn Lord, Craig Pearce, Tiffiny Dowe and Kelly Dingwall.

== Plot ==
Damon (Tamblyn Lord) graduates from high school but becomes bored during summer vacation and seeks rebellion. He befriends a trio of home invaders led by Terry (Craig Pearce), whose lifestyle provides the excitement Damon desires. However, when the gang’s crimes escalate during a home invasion that ends in murder, Damon is forced to confront the consequences and decide how far he is willing to go to survive.

== Cast ==
- Tamblyn Lord as Damon Kennedy
- Craig Pearce as Terry
- Tiffiny Dowe as Sondra Price
- Kelly Dingwall as Benny
- John Godden as Felix
- Joanna Lockwood as Diane Kennedy
- Gerard Maguire as Brian Kennedy
- Ajay Rochester as Claire
- John Clayton as Graham Price
- Louise Cullen as Adele Price

== Production ==
Producers Tom Broadbridge and David Hannay had decided to make a package of four exploitation films all shot on 35mm for the world video market which were all shot in late 1987. This was one of them - Broadbridge wanted Zwicky to make another script but he wanted to make his own and the producers agreed. The script was written in five weeks and the movie was shot in four 6-day weeks in the northern suburbs of Sydney.

== Release ==
The film was not released theatrically and went straight to video.

== See also ==
- List of films featuring home invasions
