= 48th Writers Guild of America Awards =

48th WGA Awards
- Date: 1996
- Organized by: Writers Guild of America, East and the Writers Guild of America, West

The 48th Writers Guild of America Awards honored the best television, and film writers of 1995. Winners were announced in 1996.

== Winners and nominees ==
=== Film ===
Winners are listed first highlighted in boldface.

**Best Screenplay Written Directly for the Screen**: **Braveheart, Written by Randall Wallace**; Clueless, Written by Amy Heckerling; Muriel's Wedding, Written by P. J. Hogan; Mighty Aphrodite, Written by Woody Allen; The American President, Written by Aaron Sorkin	**Best Screenplay Based on Material Previously Produced or Published**: **Sense and Sensibility, Screenplay by Emma Thompson; based on the novel by Jane Austen** †; Leaving Las Vegas, Screenplay by Mike Figgis; based on the novel by John O'Brien; Apollo 13, Screenplay by William Broyles Jr, and Al Reinert; based on the book by Jim Lovell, and Jeffrey Kluger; Babe, Screenplay by George Miller, and Chris Noonan; based on the novel by Dick King-Smith; Get Shorty, Screenplay by Scott Frank; based on the novel by Elmore Leonard

=== Television ===
**Episodic Comedy**: **"The Matchmaker" – Frasier (NBC) – Joe Keenan**; "The Club" – Frasier (NBC) – Elias Davis, and David Pollock; "The One Where Underdog Gets Away" – Friends (NBC) – Jeff Greenstein, and Jeff Strauss; "Our Fifteen Minutes" – Mad About You (NBC) – Jack Burditt; "The Ride Home" – Mad About You (NBC) – Liz Coe; "Hank's New Assistant" – The Larry Sanders Show (HBO) – John Riggi; "Arthur After Hours" – The Larry Sanders Show (HBO) – Peter Tolan; "Roseanne's Return" – The Larry Sanders Show (HBO) – Maya Forbes, Steven Levitan, and Garry Shandling	**Episodic Drama**: **"Lover's Labor Lost" – ER (NBC) – Lance Gentile**; "Fits Like a Glove" – Homicide: Life on the Street (NBC) – Bonnie Mark, Tom Fontana, and Julie Martin; "Saint Zach" – Picket Fences (CBS) – Nick Harding, and David E. Kelley; "Duane Barry" – The X-Files (FOX) – Chris Carter
**Daytime Serials**: **General Hospital (ABC) – Claire Labine, Matt Labine, Eleanor Mancusi, Meg Bennett, Ralph Ellis, Michele Val Jean, Stephanie Braxton, Karen Harris, Lewis Arlt, Judith Pinsker**; All my Children (ABC) – Agnes Nixon, Hal Corley, Frederick Johnson, N. Gail Lawrence, Jeff Beldner, Karen Lewis, Elizabeth Smith, Michelle Patrick, Bettina F. Bradbury, Pete T. Rich, Judith Donato, Megan McTavish; Another World (NBC) – Carolyn Culliton, Janet Iacobuzio, Samuel D. Ratcliffe, Lorraine Broderick, Victor Miller, Mimi Leahey, Peter Brash, Sharon Epstein, Sofia Landon Geier, Kathy Ebel, Elizabeth Page, Kathleen Kennedy; Guiding Light (CBS) – James H. Brown, Craig Carlson, Michael Conforti, Stephen Demorest, Barbara Esensten, Jeannie Glynn, Tom King, Kathleen Klein, Megan McTavish, Lynda Myles, Roger Newman, Courtney Simon, Peggy Sloane, Nancy Williams Watt	**Original Long Form**: **"24 Hours" – ER (NBC) – Michael Crichton**; A Father for Charlie (CBS) – H. Haden Yelin; Lily in Winter – Robert Eisele, J. Michael Riva, Julie Moskowitz, and Gary Stephens; Serving in Silence: The Margarethe Cammermeyer Story (NBC) – Alison Cross
**Adapted Long Form**: **Citizen X (HBO) – Chris Gerolmo**; Joseph (TNT) – Lionel Chetwynd	**Children's Script**: **"Stand Up" – CBS Schoolbreak Special (CBS) – Gordong Rayfield**; "Sharks, Beakmania & Einstein" – Beakman's World (CBS) – Philip J. Walsh, Barry Friedman, Mark Waxman, Richard Albrecht, and Casey Keller; "Between Mother and Daughter" – CBS Schoolbreak Special (CBS) – Pamela Douglas; "A Baby Worm Is Born" – Sesame Street (PBS) – Tony Geiss
**Variety - Musical, Award, Tribute, Special Event**: **"Episode #8" – Dennis Miller Live (HBO) – Eddie Feldmann, Jeff Cesario, Ed Driscoll, David Feldman, Gregory Greenberg, Dennis Miller, and Kevin Rooney**; AFI Life Achievement Award: A Tribute to Steven Spielberg (NBC) – Robert Shrum, and George Stevens Jr.

==== Documentary ====
**Current Events**: **"The Nature of Human Nature" – The Human Quest – Roger Bingham, and Carl Byker**; "The Rage Over Welfare" – 48 Hours (CBS) – Greg Kandra; "Rush Lumbaugh's America" – Frontline (PBS) – Stephen Talbot; "Currents of Fear" – Frontline (PBS) – Jon Palfreman	**Documentary – Other Than Current Events**: **The Way West (PBS) – Ric Burns**; "FDR: Part 1" – American Experience (PBS) – David Grubin; "The Battle of the Bulge: World War II's Deadliest Battle" – American Experience (PBS) – Thomas Lennon, and Mark Zwonitzer; Frederick Douglas: When the Lion Wrote History (PBS) – Steve Fayer, and Theodore Thomas
**Television Spot News Script**: **48 Hours: No Place to Hide (CBS) – Greg Kandra**

=== Radio ===
**Radio Documentary**: The 442nd (ABC Radio) – Mike Silvestein	**Radio Spot News Script**: World News This Week (ABC Radio) – Stephen B. Jones

=== Promotional writing and graphic animation ===
**On-Air Promotion**: PBS & CBS Promotions – Susan Meredith Lay	**Television Graphic Animation**: CBS Graphic Animation (CBS) – Karen McInnis

=== Special awards ===
Laurel Award for Screenwriting Achievement
**Daniel Taradash**
Laurel Award for TV Writing Achievement
**Paul Henning**
Morgan Cox Award
**Mort Thaw**
Paul Selvin Award
**David E. Kelley**
