= PV Amphibious =

Vessel in Echuca, Victoria

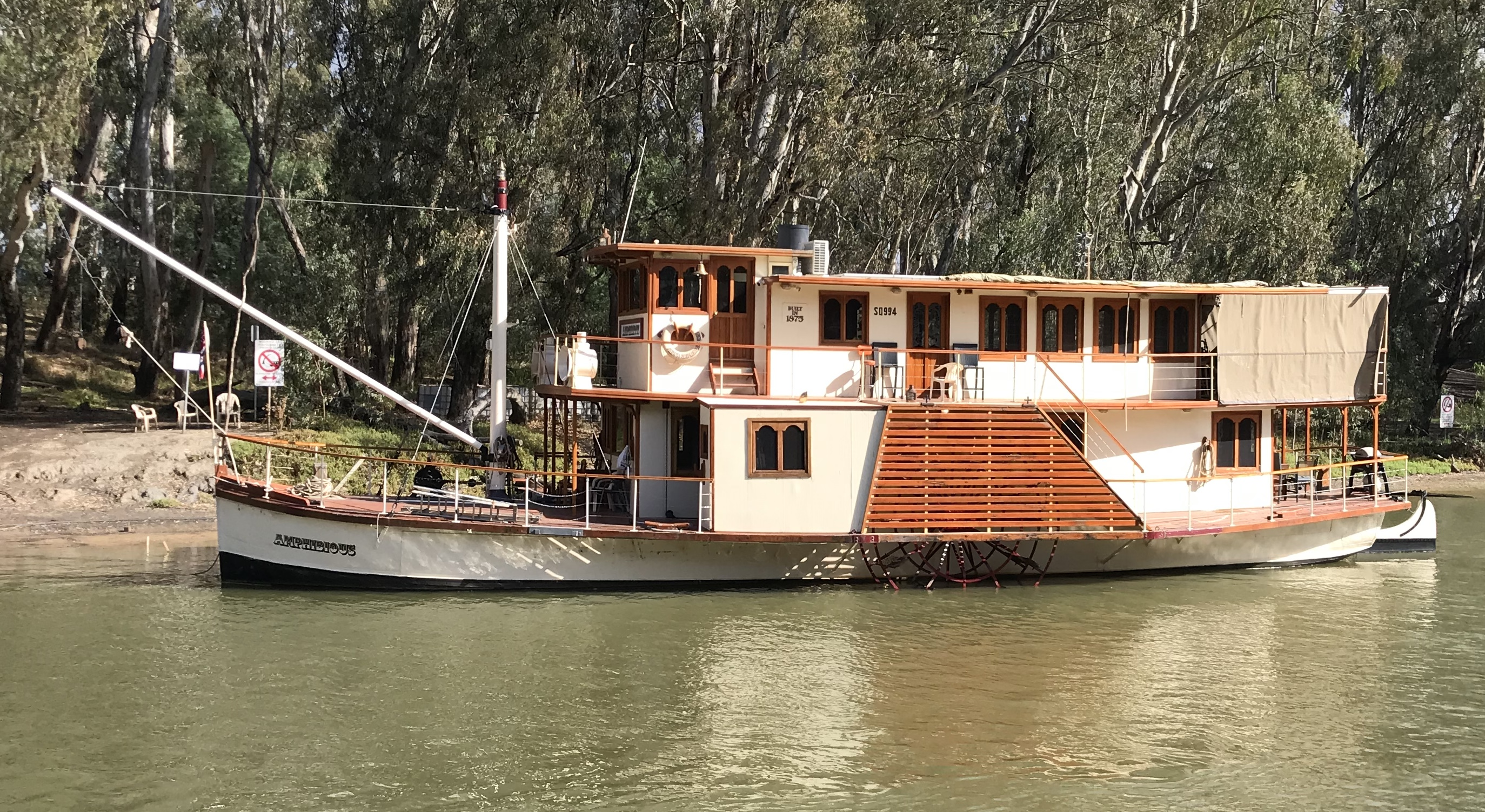
- PV Amphibious (March 2021)

History

Australia
- Name: Amphibious
- Owner: Renae Horvath
- Builder: Bevan & Cooke
- Laid down: 1875
- Launched: May 1876
- Home port: Renmark, South Australia, Australia
- Status: Private vessel

General characteristics
- Class & type: Paddle vessel
- Length: 59 ft 9.6 in (18.23 m)(1875); 76.8 ft (23.41 m)(1901)
- Beam: 16 ft 1.2 in (4.91 m)
- Propulsion: Side wheel
- Notes: References:

The PV Amphibious is a diesel-powered paddle vessel based in Renmark, South Australia. She was constructed in Melbourne in 1875 by Bevan & Cooke, and started life as a screw steamer in 1876.

== History ==
=== Construction and early life ===
The PV Amphibious was initially built as a screw steamer, with her hull dating back to 1875. Built by Bevan & Cooke at their Britannia Iron Works in Melbourne, Vic, the vessell was originally installed with a pair of double-acting 20 horsepower steam engines, driving twin 6 ft (1.83 m) propellers, allowing the vessel to operate in shallow waters. The vessel was completed in May 1876. The Amphibious was sold multiple times before her fourth owner, R Craig, lengthened her to 76.8 ft (23.41 m) in 1901. The Amphibious was sold again in 1904, and relocated to Port Adelaide, where her engines and propellers were removed in favour of converting her to a sailing ketch.

In 1956, the Amphibious was converted to an auxiliary ketch following the installation of two four-cylinder kerosine engines. Following her sale again in 1959, the Amphibious was rebuilt as a showboat (including a full-length deckhouse), and operated on the Port River in Adelaide until 1971. She was laid up and sank in 1978, but was purchased in 1980 by Dick Bromhead, repaired, and relocated to the Murray River. In 1981, the Amphibious appeared in Peter Weir's Australian war drama Gallipoli. In 1990, Bromhead rebuilt the Amphibious into a paddle vessel, for use in the 1991 Australian mini-series The River Kings filmed in and around Morgan (the boat was renamed the Lazy Jane).

=== Later life ===
Bromhead sold the Amphibious to Peter Teakle, owner of Akuna Station, in 1999, resulting in the vessel being renamed to the Akuna Amphibious. Rebuilds followed, including new underwater ribs being placed, a restructure of the deckhouse, and the addition of a modern kitchen.

Following her relocation the Echuca, (and her return to the name Amphibious) the PV Ambhipious sank at her mooring in May 2020. Owner Tim Mills had only purchased the vessel in 2019, and the paddle boat was refloated by June 2020. In August 2020, Lou Iannacone become owner of the PV Amphibious. As of June 2024, the PV Amphibious was sold to Renae Horvath, who is the present owner, returning the PV Amphibious to the Riverland in South Australia.

== Engine ==
The PV Amphibious is said to operate on a 120 hp 6354 Perkins diesel engine using a Paragon marine gearbox into Cat D4 dozer (featuring electronic clutches and brakes).
