= Tamblyn Lord =

Australian actor

- Occupation: Actor
- Notable work: The River Kings; Feeling Sexy

Tamblyn Lord is an Australian actor. He was nominated the 1992 Logie Award for Most Popular Actor in a Telemovie or Miniseries for his role in The River Kings.

Lord played the lead role Shawn Hoffner in The River Kings in 1991, starred in Viscious and Feeling Sexy. He made appearances in Murder Call Law of the Land G.P. Travelling Light, and played the lead in the Boy Soldiers episode of More Winners.

On stage Lord played Colin in Two Weeks With The Queen from the Sydney Festival in 1992 through to Russell Street Theatre in 1993 before flying to England to revisit the play at London's National Theatre in 1994. He played Troy in Hotel Sorrento (multiple venues, 1990–91), Jared in Blackrock (Wharf 2, 1996), Romeo in Romeo and Juliet (Royal Botanic Gardens, 1997), Florizel in The Winter's Tale (The Playhouse, Sydney Opera House, 1997), multiple characters in Love Fix (The Performance Space, 2000), Judd Sturgess in Ten Unknowns (Ensemble Theatre, 2002), the boy in Mother and Child (Belvoir St Downstairs Theatre, 2003) and Matt in Red Light Winter (2007).
