= Marcus D'Arcy =

Australian film editor

- Occupation: film editor
- Years active: 1981–present

Marcus D'Arcy is an Australian film editor.

He was nominated for the Academy Award for Film Editing in 1995 for his work on Babe, which he shared with Jay Friedkin.

== Selected filmography ==
Year	Film	Director	Notes
1995	Babe	Chris Noonan	Nominated—Academy Award for Best Film Editing; Nominated—BAFTA Award for Best Editing
2001	Cubbyhouse	Murray Fahey	
2003	Swimming Upstream	Russell Mulcahy	FCCA Award for Best Editing; Nominated—Inside Film Award for Best Editing
2004	Anacondas: The Hunt for the Blood Orchid	Dwight H. Little	
2010	Tomorrow, When the War Began	Stuart Beattie	Nominated—AACTA Award for Best Editing; Nominated—ASE Award for Best Editing in a Feature Film; Nominated—FCCA Award for Best Editing
2013	Drift	Morgan O'Neill; Ben Nott	
2014	I, Frankenstein	Stuart Beattie	
2015	Oddball	Stuart McDonald	
2015	Last Cab to Darwin	Jeremy Sims	
2020	Rams	Jeremy Sims	
