= The Sheep-Pig =

1983 children's novel by Dick King-Smith

- First edition
- Author: Dick King-Smith
- Illustrator: Mary Rayner
- Language: English
- Publisher: Gollancz
- Publication date: 12 November 1983
- Publication place: United Kingdom
- Media type: Print (hardback and paperback)
- Pages: 118 pp (first edition)
- ISBN: 0575033754
- OCLC: 59194695
- LC Class: PZ7.K5893 Sh 1984; PZ7.K5893 Bab 1985

The Sheep-Pig, or Babe, the Gallant Pig in the United States, is a 1983 children's novel by British author Dick King-Smith, first published by Gollancz with illustrations by Mary Rayner. Set in rural England, where King-Smith spent twenty years as a farmer, it features a lone Pig on a Sheep farm. King-Smith won the 1984 Guardian Children's Fiction Award, a once-in-a-lifetime book award judged by a panel of British children's writers.

Crown published the first US edition in 1985, retaining the Rayner illustrations. There have been dozens of English-language editions and translations in fifteen other languages, primarily in 1995 and later, sometimes with new illustrations.

The novel was loosely adapted as the 1995 film Babe.

== Plot ==
The plot revolves around a young livestock Piglet, won at a fair by a local Sheep farmer named Farmer Hogget. He has no use for Pigs, so his wife intends to fatten up the "little porker" for Christmas dinner.

In unfamiliar surroundings, the little Piglet is scared. However, he meets Fly the Sheepdog, who takes pity on him and comforts him. She asks what his name is, and he replies that his mother called all her children Babe. Fly and her puppies teach Babe the rules of the farm. Babe starts to learn how to herd Sheep, first practising and failing with the ducks. However, he has the idea of herding the Sheep by asking them politely rather than ordering them about like Sheepdogs do. Fly's puppies are soon sold, and Fly is heartbroken, so Babe asks her if he could be her son.

One day Farmer Hogget and Fly bring a sickly ewe named Maa back to the farm. When Babe meets Maa in the farm stable, Maa helps Babe to realise that Sheep are not as stupid as Fly has told him. Babe promises to visit Maa again when she is well. Sometime later, when Babe visits Maa in the fields, he sees Sheep rustlers kidnapping the Sheep. Babe saves the Sheep and herds them away from the rustlers' lorry. He also bites one of the rustlers in the leg and squeals so loudly that Mrs. Hogget telephones the police. When the patrol car comes up the lane, the rustlers drive away, with no Sheep. Babe has saved the flock and Mrs. Hogget decides to reward him by sparing his life.

Later on, Farmer Hogget takes Babe with him up to the fields, and, on a whim, asks the Pig to round up the Sheep. Just as Babe is asking the Sheep politely, Maa appears in the centre of the herd to tell them about Babe. Hogget is astonished that the Sheep are walking in perfect straight lines around their pen. From then on, Babe accompanies Farmer Hogget up to the fields every day.

Hogget starts to think that since Babe is a worthy animal, he could enter him into the Sheepdog trials. He begins to train the Pig in what he needs to do. One morning, when Babe heads up to the fields alone, he finds the Sheep panicking because a pack of feral dogs are terrorising them. Babe runs back to the farm and alerts Fly. However, Babe discovers that Maa is critically injured, and she dies before she can be helped. Hogget arrives on the scene, sees Babe with a dead Sheep and believes that the Pig may have killed her. He prepares to murder Babe by shooting him with his gun, in case he is a danger to the other animals. However, Mrs. Hogget tells Farmer Hogget about the dogs who have attacked the Sheep. Fly, unable to believe that Babe could do such a thing, goes to ask the Sheep what really happened. She even forces herself to be polite to them, and so the Sheep willingly tell her that Babe saved their lives. Babe is proven innocent, and Farmer Hogget resumes his training, entering him into the county Sheepdog trials.

Before Babe goes for the trials, Fly manages to obtain a password from the Sheep, so that Babe can speak to the Sheep he'll be herding. On the day of the trials Babe and Fly go with Farmer Hogget to the grounds. Farmer Hogget appears with Fly but swaps her for Babe. He performs perfectly, without any commands from Farmer Hogget, and says the password to the Sheep. At the end of his trial Babe and Farmer Hogget score full marks, and Farmer Hogget looks down at his Sheep-Pig and tells him, "That'll do, Pig."

== Chapters ==
The Sheep-Pig contains twelve short chapters, each one written in speech marks (" "):

1. "Guess my weight"
2. "There. Is that nice?"
3. "Why can't I learn?"
4. "You'm a polite young chap"
5. "Keep yelling, young un"
6. "Good Pig"
7. "What's trials?"
8. "Oh, Maa!"
9. "Was it Babe?"
10. "Memorize it"
11. "Today is the day"
12. "That'll do"

== Adaptations ==
The 1995 Universal Pictures movie loose adaptation Babe was directed by Chris Noonan from a screenplay written by Noonan and George Miller, one of the producers. Miller needed ten years to take the book from paperback to big screen. It was filmed in Australia with creature effects from The Jim Henson Company.

The novel was also adapted for the stage by children's playwright David Wood. The stage version uses a cast of actors and life size puppets for an audience of young children.
