= John Cox (special effects artist) =

Australian special effects artist

- Born: 18 December 1959 (age 66)
- Occupation: Visual effects artist
- Years active: 1983-2008
- Website: http://www.johncox.net/

John Cox (born 18 December 1959) is an Australian special effects artist who won at the 68th Academy Awards in the category of Best Visual Effects. He won for the film Babe, which he shared his win with Scott E. Anderson, Charles Gibson, and Neal Scanlan.
