= Mary Stein =

American actress

- Born: Marquette, Michigan
- Education: Marquette University (BA); Juilliard School (GrDip)
- Occupation: Actress
- Years active: 1990–present
- Website: marystein.org

Mary Stein is an American actress.

== Early life and education ==
Stein was born in Marquette, Michigan and grew up in Milwaukee, Wisconsin. She began her acting career performing in plays. She graduated from Franklin High School and she received a B.A. degree from Marquette University in 1980. She then attended the Juilliard School's Drama Division as a member of Group 13 (1980–1984). Other students at Juilliard during that time include Val Kilmer (Group 10), Kevin Spacey (Group 12), and Thomas Gibson (Group 14).

== Career ==
Following graduation from Juilliard, Stein got her first screen acting job in the "Time's Arrow" episode of Star Trek: The Next Generation, playing an alien nurse. As her career developed, she played roles such as Miss Floom, the landlady and owner of the Flealands Hotel in Babe: Pig in the City and Miss Rue Who in How the Grinch Stole Christmas. Some of her well-known television roles include Ms. Sneed on General Hospital and Gerda in Providence. She also appeared in Clint Eastwood's film Changeling, alongside Angelina Jolie.

== Filmography ==
=== Film ===
| Year | Title | Role | Notes |
|---|---|---|---|
| 1990 | Alice | Nun | Uncredited |
| 1995 | Man of the Year | Angela Lucassey | |
| 1998 | Dead Man on Campus | Irritated Woman | |
| 1998 | Babe: Pig in the City | Miss Floom | |
| 2000 | How the Grinch Stole Christmas | Miss Rue Who | |
| 2001 | Monkeybone | Lulu | |
| 2002 | Men in Black II | Bird Lady Alien | |
| 2004 | 30 Days Until I'm Famous | Dale the Dispatcher | TV movie |
| 2006 | The Legend of Tillamook's Gold | Billie Stahl | |
| 2008 | Changeling | Janet Hutchins | |
| 2009 | Portal | Nurse Theresa | |
| 2015 | Little Boy | Martha | |
| 2021 | California Dreaming | Ms. Black | TV movie |

=== Television ===
| Year | Title | Role | Notes |
|---|---|---|---|
| 1992 | Star Trek: The Next Generation | Alien Nurse | 1 episode |
| 1993 | Murphy Brown | Woman #4 | 1 episode |
| 1995 | Deadly Games | Secretary | 1 episode |
| 1996 | Married... with Children | Judge #2 | 1 episode |
| 1997 | Beyond Belief: Fact or Fiction | Fat Man's Wife | 2 episodes |
| 2000 | Cousin Skeeter | Teacher | 1 episode |
| 2000 | MADtv | Herself | 1 episode |
| 2001 | The Nightmare Room | Mrs. Falca | 1 episode |
| 2002 | Even Stevens | Lynn Shannon | 1 episode |
| 2002 | Push, Nevada | Myrna | 4 episodes |
| 2002 | MDs | Sandra Conley | 1 episode |
| 2002 | Providence | Gerda | 10 episodes |
| 2005 | Hot Properties | Jane | 1 episode |
| 2006 | General Hospital | Ms. Sneed | 4 episodes |
| 2007 | Unfabulous | Nun | 1 episode |
| 2009 | The Ex List | Karen Harris | 1 episode |
| 2013 | Brooklyn Nine-Nine | Melanie | 1 episode |
| 2013 | Glee | Pam Fronkstein | 1 episode |
| 2013-2014 | Actors Entertainment | Herself | 2 episodes |
| 2015 | Wicked City | Librarian | 1 episode |
| 2015 | The Jimmy Star Show with Ron Russell | Herself | 1 episode |
| 2020 | The Haves and the Have Nots | Doctor Patton | 1 episode |
| 2021 | Legacies | Rich Woman | 1 episode |
