= Kerrie Brown =

American set decorator

- Occupation: Set decorator
- Years active: 1988-present

Kerrie Brown is a set decorator. She was nominated for an Academy Award in the category Best Art Direction for the film Babe.

== Selected filmography ==
- The Raven (2012)
- The Chronicles of Narnia: Prince Caspian (2008)
- The Chronicles of Narnia: The Lion, the Witch and the Wardrobe (2005)
- Peter Pan (2003)
- Babe (1995)
