= Bill Miller (film producer) =

Australian film producer

- Born: 1953 (age 72–73); Queensland, Australia
- Occupations: Film producer, lawyer
- Years active: 1970–present
- Relatives: George Miller (brother)

Bill Miller (born 1953) is a Sydney-based feature film producer.

== Life and career ==
Bill Miller was born in Queensland and along with his older brother George Miller, attended Sydney Boys High School. Like George, who gave up practicing medicine to become a film director, Bill, a successful arts and entertainment lawyer, gave up the legal profession to pursue a film-making career. He collaborated with George and Byron Kennedy on their early short films, including Violence in the Cinema: Part One, a 14-minute parody of the violent films of the 1970s. This short won two Australian Film Institute Awards, and provided the film-making trio with the confidence to pursue more ambitious projects and Bill acted as associate producer on the original Mad Max, starring Mel Gibson.

Bill shared the honour of being an Academy Award nominee with George and long-time producing partner Doug Mitchell for their work as producers on the family film Babe. In addition to being nominated for Best Picture in 1996, the film earned a total of seven Academy Award nominations, winning the Oscar for Best Visual Effects. It also won a Golden Globe for Best Motion Picture (Comedy/Musical) and garnered a BAFTA Award nomination for Best Film. Following the success of Babe, he also went on to serve as a producer on its sequel, Babe: Pig in the City.

With George and Doug Mitchell, he produced the animated film Happy Feet, a musical epic about the life of penguins in Antarctica, featuring the voices of Robin Williams, Elijah Wood, Nicole Kidman, Hugh Jackman, Anthony La Paglia, Magda Szubanski, Hugo Weaving and Brittany Murphy. Prior to starting production he took part in a six-week expedition to south Antarctica. The Warner Brothers-distributed film was released in late 2006, and went on to become one of Australia's most successful animated film projects. A worldwide box office success, it was nominated for various awards including a Golden Globe, going on to win the Academy Award Oscar for Best Animated Feature and the equivalent British BAFTA award. Miller followed up as producer on the animated sequel, Happy Feet 2, released worldwide in late 2011. He has since been developing projects for film, television and live theatre.

== Filmography ==
Year	Title	Role
1970	Violence in the Cinema, Part 1	Production Manager
1979	Mad Max	Associate Producer
1986	Something Wild	Associate Producer
1995	Babe	Producer
1998	Babe: Pig in the City	Producer
2006	Happy Feet	Producer
2011	Happy Feet Two	Producer
