= Brian Simmons (sound engineer) =

British sound engineer

- Occupation: Sound engineer
- Years active: 1966–present

Brian Simmons is a British sound engineer. He was nominated for an Academy Award in the category Best Sound for the film Braveheart. He has worked on more than 100 films since 1966.

== Selected filmography ==
- Braveheart (1995)
