= The River Kings =

- Genre: mini-series
- Written by: Rob George
- Directed by: Donald Crombie
- Starring: Tamblyn Lord; Bill Kerr
- Country of origin: Australia
- Original language: English
- No. of episodes: 4

Production
- Producer: Rob George
- Running time: 4 x 1 hour

Original release
- Network: ABC
- Release: 10 November – 1 December 1991

The River Kings is a 1991 Australian mini series based on the novels The River Kings (1966) and Conquest of the River (1970) by Max Fatchen. It had a budget of $3.5 million. The paddle vessel PV Amphibious starred in the series as the Lazy Jane.

== Plot ==
During the 1921 Mallee drought, sixteen-year-old Shawn Hoffner leaves behind farm life to find work to support his family. He finds work on a River Murray steamboat.

== Cast ==
- Tamblyn Lord as Shawn Hoffner
- Hamish Fletcher as Michael Hoffner
- Bill Kerr as Captain Elijah
- Willie Fennell as Praying Jack
- Reg Evans as Mallee Ned
- John Cousins as Rasheen
- Edward Hepple as Angus
- Kate Mulcahy as Mary Thompson
- David Bradshaw as Captain Snane

== Reception ==
Domenic Buchanan in the Sydney Morning Herald called it a "a well-made and appealing piece of family entertainment". In the Age's Green Guide Margaret Geddes wrote "If it's nitty gritty realism you're after, you won't find it in The River Kings. On the other hand, if you like a bit of a swoon and a few laughs, enjoy it with your children."

== Home media ==
The series has been published in Australia by Beyond Home Entertainment on DVD: format 4:3; total running time 191 minutes.
