= Davida Allen =

Australian artist, writer

Davida Frances Allen
- Born: 20 October 1951 (age 74); Charleville, Queensland, Australia
- Education: Brisbane Central Technical College
- Known for: Painting, writing
- Awards: Archibald Prize, 1986

Davida Frances Allen (born 20 October 1951) is an Australian painter, filmmaker and writer.

== Early life and education ==
Davida Allen was born on 20 October 1951 in Charleville, Queensland.

She studied under Betty Churcher at the Stuartholme School, Brisbane (1965–69) and later under Roy Churcher (Betty Churcher's husband) at Brisbane Central Technical College (1970–72).

== Career ==
Allen has written and illustrated two books, and has created a 50-minute film, Feeling Sexy (1999), on the struggles of an artist attempting to reconcile the conflicting demands of bohemia and suburbia. The film was invited to the Venice Film Festival.

She frequently confronts the themes of family and sexuality; regarding the latter she has said: "if we are truly feminist in the fullest sense of the word, we shouldn't have felt we had to lock it away or be really careful about it. We should be chauvinist in our womanhood."

Allen is represented in all major public collections in Australia, and the Museum of New Zealand Te Papa Tongarewa.

=== Awards and nominations ===
- 1986: Archibald Prize, for her portrait of her father-in-law, John Shera (My father-in-law watering his garden)
- 1999: Film Critics Circle of Australia Awards, nominated for "Best Direction", won "Best Original Screenplay" award
- 2010: Tattersalls Club Landscape Art Prize

== Exhibitions ==
=== Solo exhibitions ===
- College Gallery (Brisbane College of Advanced Education), 1984
- Museum of Contemporary Art in South Brisbane, 1987, a major retrospective survey
- Griffith University Art Museum, Brisbane, 2018

=== Group exhibitions ===
- Ray Hughes Gallery at Pinacotheca, Pinacotheca Art Gallery (Richmond, Victoria), 1981
- Nine Queensland artists, Perc Tucker Regional Gallery, Townsville, 1981
- Contemporary Art in Australia – A Review, inaugural exhibition of the Museum of Contemporary Art in South Brisbane, 1987
- Blue chip X : the collectors' exhibition, Niagara Galleries, Melbourne, 2008

=== Commercial galleries ===
- Ray Hughes Gallery, Brisbane, in 1973, 1975, 1978, 1979, 1981, 1982, 1985 and 1986
- Australian Galleries, Sydney, in 1993, 1996, 2001
- Philip Bacon Galleries, Brisbane, in 1999, 2001, 2003, 2005, 2008, 2010, 2012, 2014, 2016.

=== International group exhibitions ===
- D'un autre continent: l'Australie le rêve er le réel, curated by Suzanne Page/Leon Paroissien, Musée d'Art Moderne de la Ville de Paris; shown internationally in Vienna, Texas and Venice (1983)
- An international survey of recent painting and sculpture, curated by Kynaston McShine, Museum of Modern Art (MoMA), New York City (1984)
- Kunst mit Eigen-Sinn, curated by Silvia Eiblmayr, Valie Export, Monika Prischl-Maier, Museum des 20. Jahrhunderts (Museum of the 20th Century), Vienna (1985)
- Davida Allen, curated by Anne Kirker, National Art Gallery of New Zealand; touring to four other New Zealand museums: Sarjeant Gallery, Wanganui; Fisher Gallery, Pakuranga, Auckland; Govett-Brewster Art Gallery, New Plymouth; Manawatu Art Gallery, Palmerston North (1986)
- Painters and sculptors, curated by Michael Sourgnes, Queensland Art Gallery, Brisbane; travelling to Museum of Contemporary Art, Saitama, Japan (1987)
- ROSC, an International Exhibition, Dublin, Ireland (1988)

Awards
Preceded by Guy Warren	Archibald Prize; 1986 for Dr. John Arthur McKelvey Shera	Succeeded by William Robinson
