= Neal Scanlan =

British visual effects artist

- Born: 1961 (age 64–65); Manchester, England, U.K.
- Other name: Neal Scanlon
- Occupation: Visual effects artist
- Years active: 1981–present
- Website: http://www.nealscanlan.com

Neal Scanlan (born 1961) is a British special effects artist and make-up artist, best known for his work on the Star Wars sequel trilogy and standalone films. He won an Academy Award for Best Visual Effects for Babe in 1996.

== Selected filmography ==
- Charlie and the Chocolate Factory (2005)
- Sweeney Todd: The Demon Barber of Fleet Street (2007)
- Prometheus (2012)
- Star Wars: The Force Awakens (2015)
- Rogue One: A Star Wars Story (2016)
- Star Wars: The Last Jedi (2017)
- Solo: A Star Wars Story (2018)
- Jurassic World: Fallen Kingdom (2018)
- Star Wars: The Rise of Skywalker (2019)
- Beetlejuice Beetlejuice (2024)
- Project Hail Mary (2026)

== Television ==
- Tweenies – Animatronic Heads
- The Paz Show – Animatronic heads and bodies
- Fimbles – Animatronic heads, Fat suits and Puppets
- Dead Ringers – Fat Suits and Animation Heads (Brightly Colored Blobs Segments)
- The Shiny Show – Puppets (Tigs and Dogsby)
- The Roly Mo Show – Puppets (alongside Neil Sterenberg)
- LazyTown - Full Sized Puppets (alongside Wit Puppets)
- CBeebies – Special Effects, Puppets and Props
- Andor – Creature & droid effects
