= Chris Noonan =

Australian filmmaker and actor (born 1952)

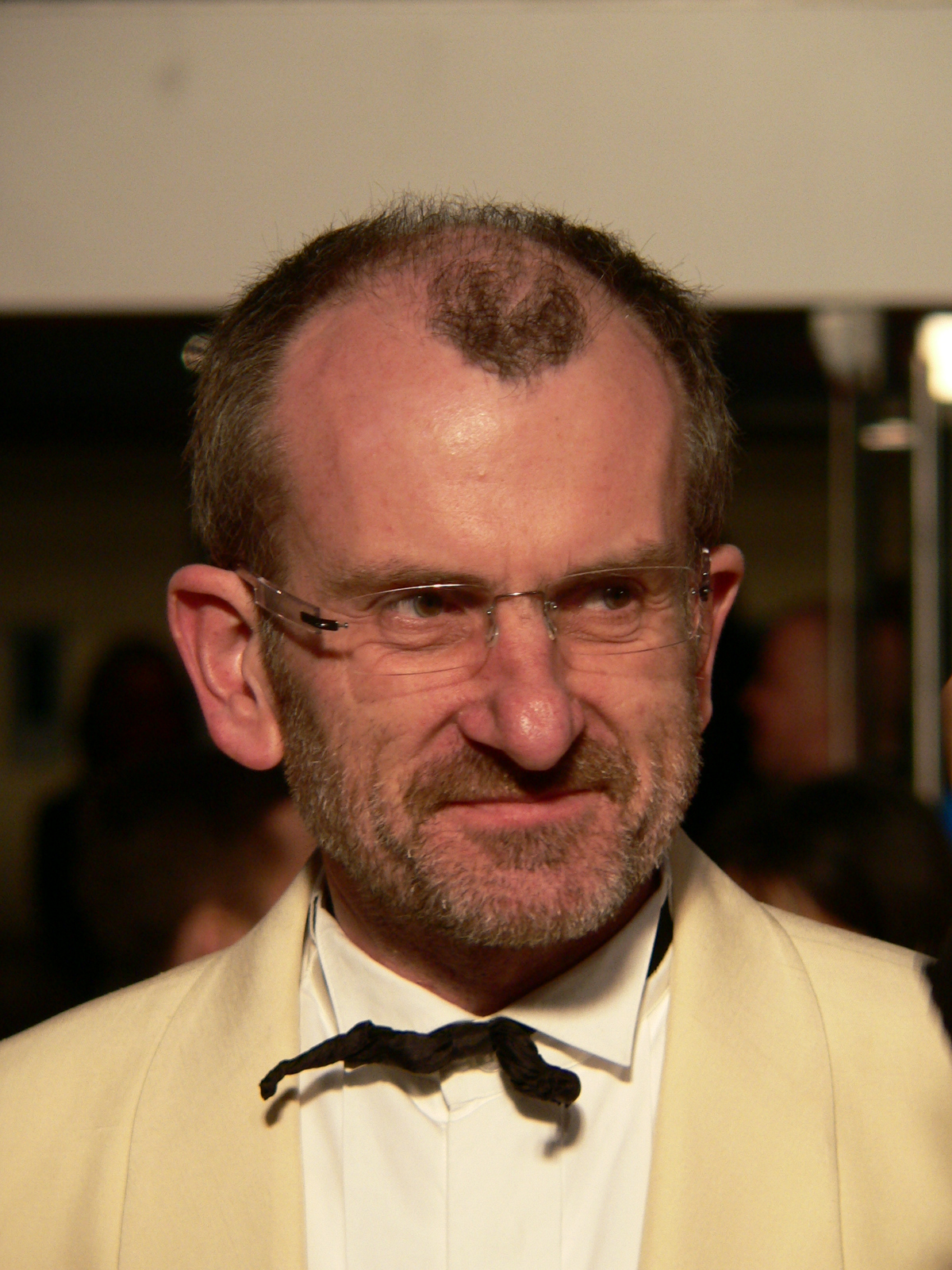
- Noonan at the premiere of Miss Potter in 2006
- Born: Christopher Noonan; 14 November 1952 (age 72); Sydney, New South Wales, Australia
- Occupation(s): Film director, film producer, screenwriter and actor
- Years active: 1970–present

Chris Noonan (born 14 November 1952) is an Australian filmmaker and actor. He is best known for the family film Babe (1995), for which he was nominated for the Academy Award for Best Director and Academy Award for Best Adapted Screenplay.

== Biography ==
Encouraged by his father, Noonan made his first short film, Could It Happen Here?, set at North Sydney Boys High School when he was sixteen. It won a prize at the Sydney Film Festival and was later screened on Australian television. On leaving school in 1970, Noonan went to work for the Commonwealth Film Unit (now Film Australia), as a production assistant, assistant editor, production manager and assistant director making short films and documentaries.

In 1973 Noonan was in the inaugural intake on the directors' course (along with Gillian Armstrong and Phillip Noyce) at the Australian Film Television and Radio School. In 1974 he returned to Film Australia where he worked on a number of films and documentaries, including working as assistant director on the cult movie The Cars That Ate Paris. In 1976 he directed Film Australia's documentary series, "Our Asian Neighbours: India", including a film about Swami Shyam, a teacher of Vedant and Meditation living in the Indian Himalayas.

In 1979 he set up his own production company, and in 1980 documented the lives of a troupe of disabled actors, in the film Stepping Out, which won the UNESCO prize in 1980 and an Australian Film Institute Award for 'Best Documentary' in 1981. He co-wrote and co-directed the Australian mini-series The Cowra Breakout, wrote and directed five episodes of the mini-series, Vietnam, and made his television movie debut with The Riddle of the Stinson.

Noonan served for two years (1987–88) as President of the Australian Screen Directors' Association, and in 1990 was appointed for a three-year term as Chairman of the Australian Film Commission.

In 1995 he wrote the screenplay, with George Miller, and directed the film, Babe, his first theatrical feature. The film earned US$280 million in its 18-language world theatrical release, a further US$217 million in international video sales and was nominated for seven Academy Awards (including nominations for Noonan for directing and writing). The film was recognised with many other honors, including BAFTA Award nominations for Film and Adapted Screenplay.

He co-produced the popular Davida Allen telemovie, Feeling Sexy, in 1999.

In 2006 he directed the biographical film, Miss Potter, based on the life of children's author Beatrix Potter. As of 2008, Noonan had two further projects in development, but those did not come to fruition.

== Filmography ==
=== Film ===
Year	Title	Director	Writer	Producer	Notes
1973	Bulls	Yes	Yes	No	
1980	Stepping Out	Yes	Yes	Yes	Documentary short
1995	Babe	Yes	Yes	No	Nominated- Academy Award for Best Director; Nominated- Academy Award for Best Adapted Screenplay; Nominated- BAFTA Award for Best Adapted Screenplay
2006	Miss Potter	Yes	No	No	

Executive Producer

- Feeling Sexy (1999)
- Ticket Out (2010)

=== Television ===
TV movies

Year	Title	Director	Writer
1978	Cass	Yes	No
1988	The Riddle of the Stinson	Yes	No
1989	Police State	Yes	Yes

TV series

Year	Title	Director	Writer	Notes
1984	The Cowra Breakout	Yes	Yes	Mini-series
1987	Vietnam	Yes	Yes	Mini-series
2011	Crownies	Yes	No	2 episodes
2013	The Time of Our Lives	Yes	No	Episode "The First New Chapter"

=== Other credits ===
Year	Title	Role
1974	27A	Title Designer
1974	The Cars That Ate Paris	Assistant Director
1996	Idiot Box	Actor
2000	A Wreck, a Tangle	Thanks
2003	Preservation	Director Mentor
2004	Somersault	Script Advisor: Aurora
