= 50th British Academy Film Awards =

1997 film awards ceremony

- Date: 29 April 1997
- Site: Royal Albert Hall
- Hosted by: Lenny Henry

Highlights
- Best Film: The English Patient
- Best British Film: Secrets & Lies
- Best Actor: Geoffrey Rush; Shine
- Best Actress: Brenda Blethyn; Secrets & Lies
- Most awards: The English Patient (6)
- Most nominations: The English Patient (13)

The 50th British Academy Film Awards, more commonly known as the BAFTAs, took place on 29 April 1997 at the Royal Albert Hall in London, honouring the best national and foreign films of 1996. Presented by the British Academy of Film and Television Arts, accolades were handed out for the best feature-length film and documentaries of any nationality that were screened at British cinemas in 1998.

Anthony Minghella's The English Patient won the award for Best Film (and previously won the Academy Award for Best Picture), while Mike Leigh's Secrets & Lies was voted Outstanding British Film. Geoffrey Rush won for Best Actor in a Leading Role for his role in Shine and Brenda Blethyn won for Best Actress in a Leading Role for her role in Secrets & Lies, respectively.

The ceremony was hosted by actor and comedian Lenny Henry.

== Winners and nominees ==
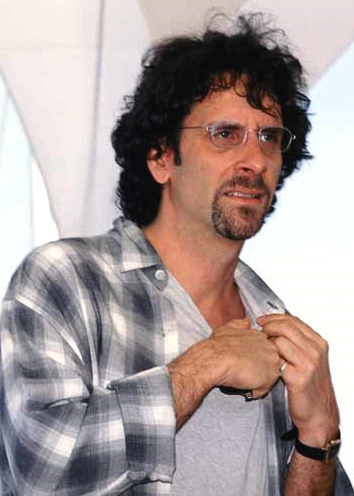
Joel Coen, Best Director winner

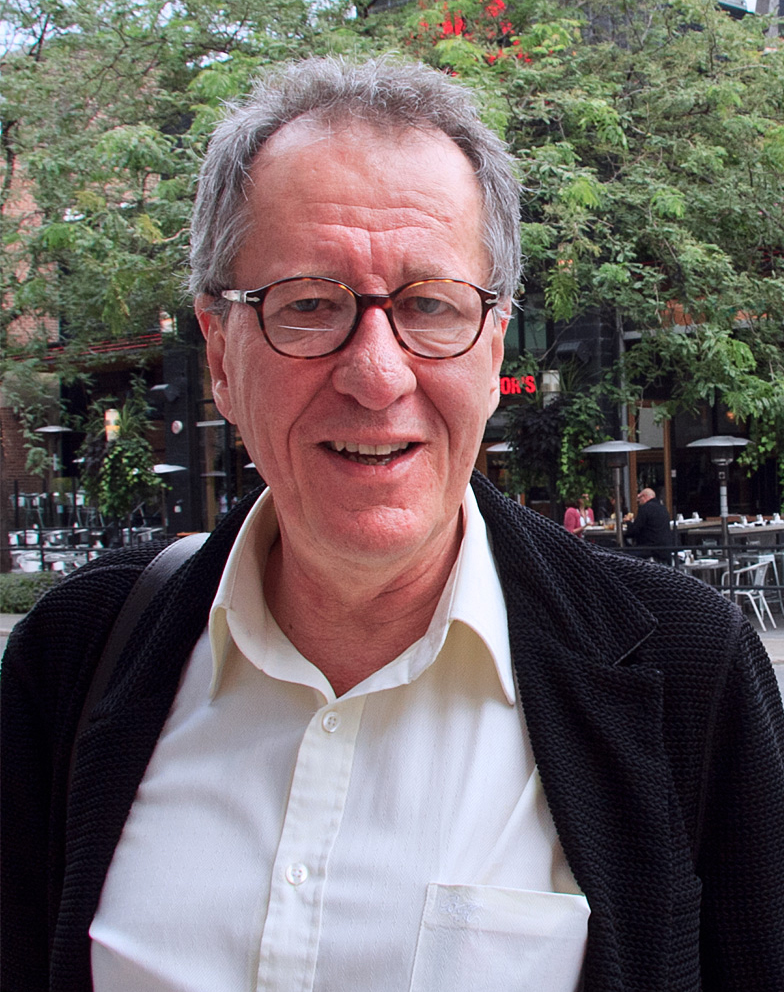
Geoffrey Rush, Best Actor winner

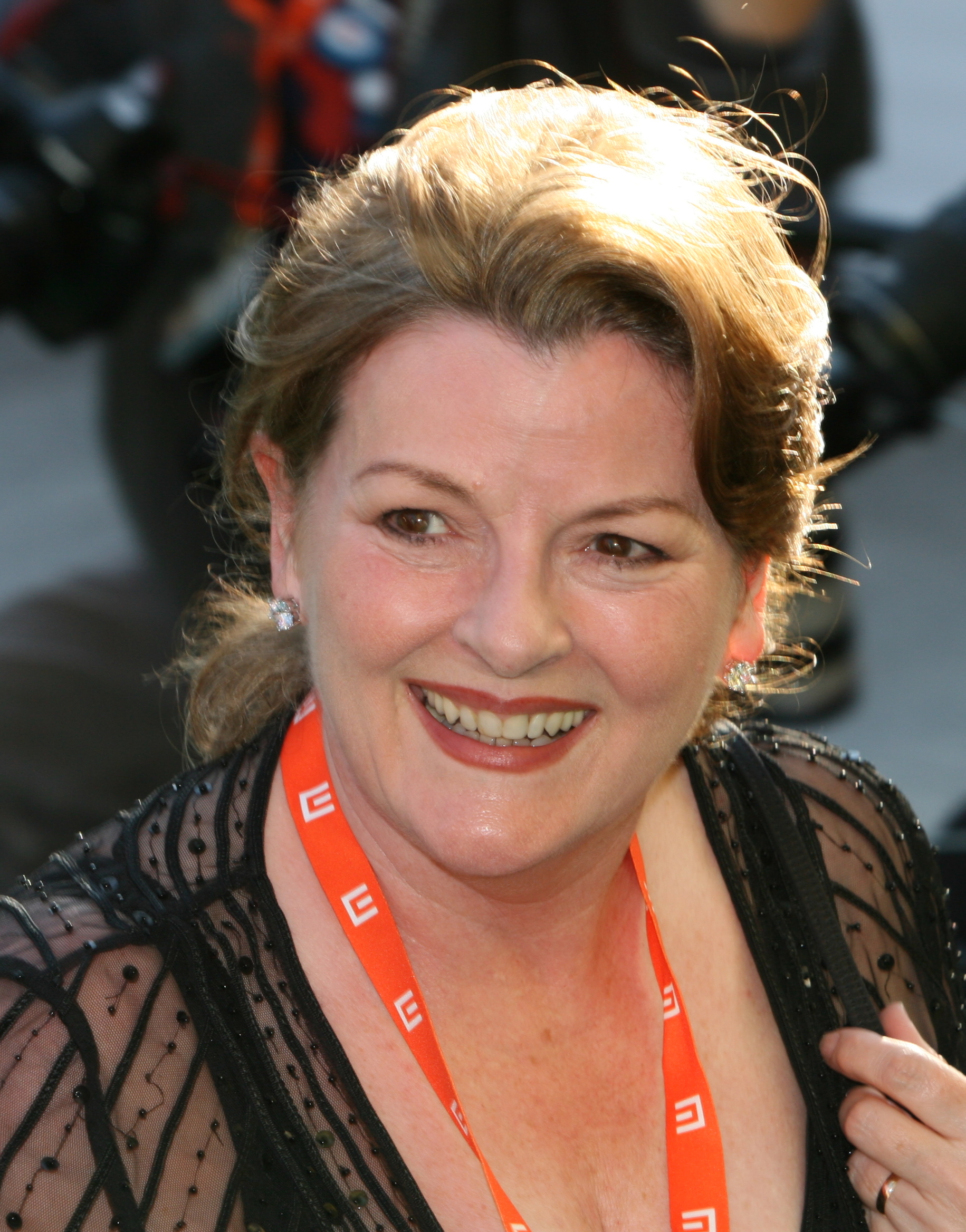
Brenda Blethyn, Best Actress winner

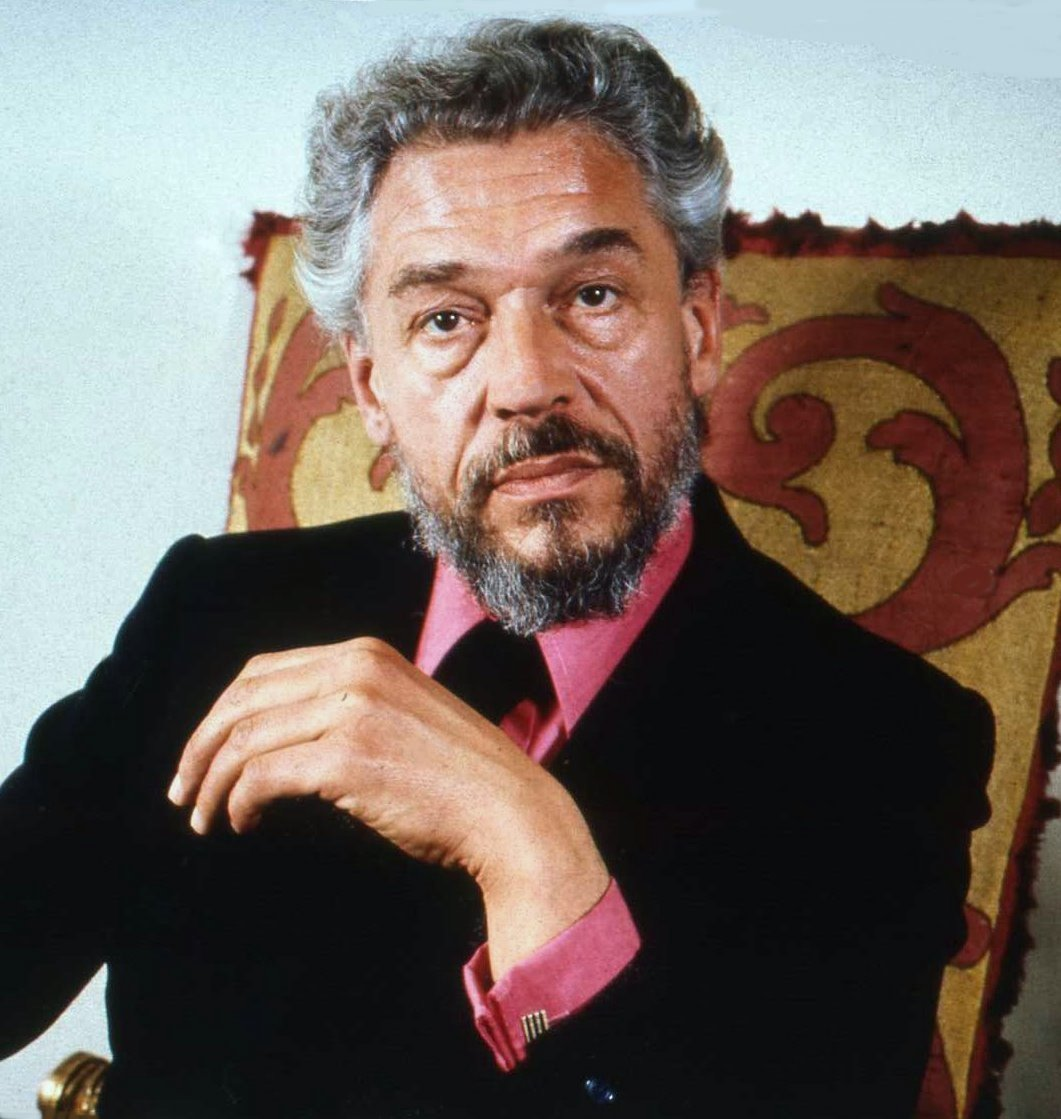
Paul Scofield, Best Supporting Actor winner

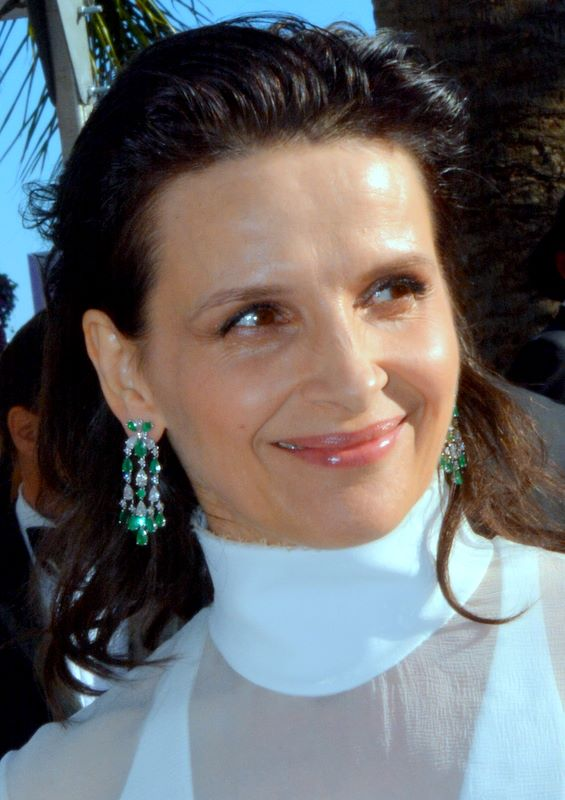
Juliette Binoche, Best Supporting Actress winner

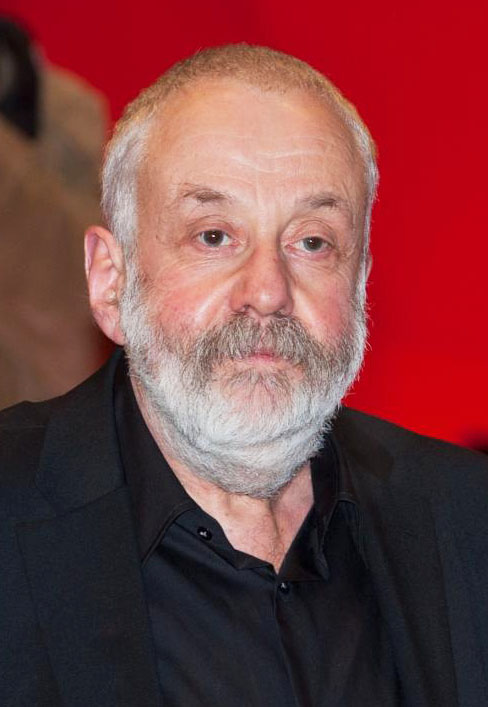
Mike Leigh, Best Original Screenplay winner and Outstanding British Film co-winner

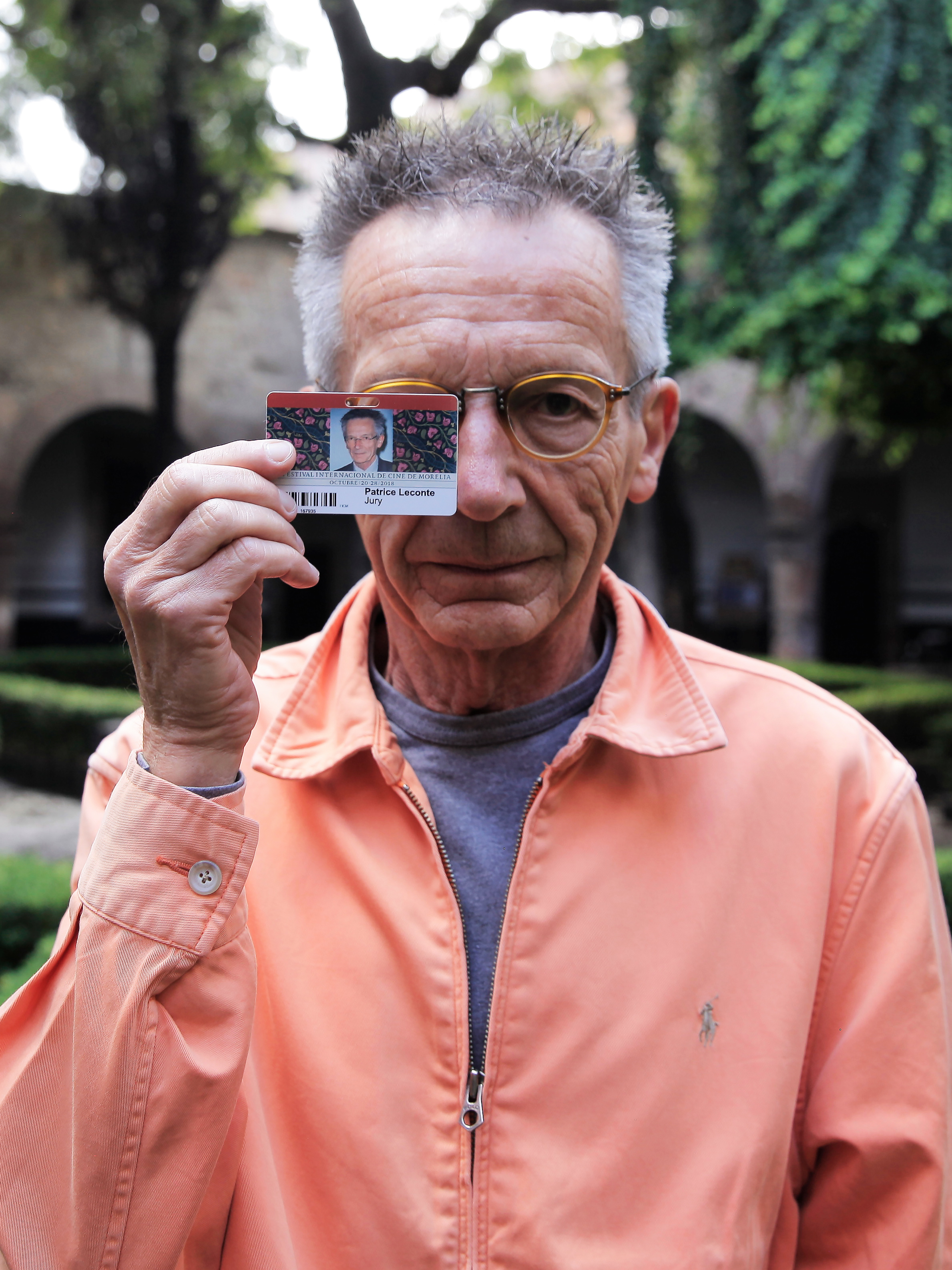
Patrice Leconte, Best Film Not in the English Language co-winner

=== BAFTA Fellowship ===
- **Woody Allen**, **Julie Christie**, **Oswald Morris** and **Harold Pinter**

=== Outstanding British Contribution to Cinema ===
- **Film4 Productions**

=== Awards ===
Winners are listed first and highlighted in boldface.

**Best Film**: **The English Patient – Saul Zaentz and Anthony Minghella**; Fargo – Joel Coen and Ethan Coen; Secrets & Lies – Simon Channing Williams and Mike Leigh; Shine – Jane Scott and Scott Hicks	**Best Direction**: **Joel Coen – Fargo**; Scott Hicks – Shine; Mike Leigh – Secrets & Lies; Anthony Minghella – The English Patient
**Best Actor in a Leading Role**: **Geoffrey Rush – Shine as David Helfgott**; Ralph Fiennes – The English Patient as László Almásy; Ian McKellen – Richard III as Richard III; Timothy Spall – Secrets & Lies as Maurice Purley	**Best Actress in a Leading Role**: **Brenda Blethyn – Secrets & Lies as Cynthia Rose Purley**; Frances McDormand – Fargo as Marge Gunderson; Kristin Scott Thomas – The English Patient as Katharine Clifton; Emily Watson – Breaking the Waves as Bess McNeill
**Best Actor in a Supporting Role**: **Paul Scofield – The Crucible as Thomas Danforth**; John Gielgud – Shine as Cecil Parkes; Edward Norton – Primal Fear as Aaron Stampler / Roy; Alan Rickman – Michael Collins as Éamon de Valera	**Best Actress in a Supporting Role**: **Juliette Binoche – The English Patient as Hana**; Lauren Bacall – The Mirror Has Two Faces as Hannah Morgan; Marianne Jean-Baptiste – Secrets & Lies as Hortense Cumberbatch; Lynn Redgrave – Shine as Gillian
**Best Original Screenplay**: **Secrets & Lies – Mike Leigh**; Brassed Off – Mark Herman; Fargo – Ethan Coen and Joel Coen; Lone Star – John Sayles; Shine – Jan Sardi	**Best Adapted Screenplay**: **The English Patient – Anthony Minghella**; The Crucible – Arthur Miller; Evita – Alan Parker and Oliver Stone; Richard III – Ian McKellen and Richard Loncraine
**Best Cinematography**: **The English Patient – John Seale**; Evita – Darius Khondji; Fargo – Roger Deakins; Michael Collins – Chris Menges	**Best Costume Design**: **Richard III – Shuna Harwood**; The English Patient – Ann Roth; Evita – Penny Rose; Hamlet – Alexandra Byrne
**Best Editing**: **The English Patient – Walter Murch**; Evita – Gerry Hambling; Fargo – Roderick Jaynes; Shine – Pip Karmel	**Best Makeup and Hair**: **The Nutty Professor – Rick Baker and David LeRoy Anderson**; 101 Dalmatians – Lynda Armstrong, Martial Corneville, Colin Jamison and Jean-Luc Russier; The English Patient – Fabrizio Sforza and Nigel Booth; Evita – Sarah Monzani and Martin Samuel
**Best Original Music**: **The English Patient – Gabriel Yared**; Brassed Off – Trevor Jones; Evita – Andrew Lloyd Webber and Tim Rice; Shine – David Hirschfelder	**Best Production Design**: **Richard III – Tony Burrough**; The English Patient – Stuart Craig; Evita – Brian Morris; Hamlet – Tim Harvey
**Best Sound**: **Shine – Jim Greenhorn, Toivo Lember, Livia Ruzic, Roger Savage and Gareth Vanderhope**; The English Patient – Mark Berger, Pat Jackson, Walter Murch, Chris Newman, David Parker and Ivan Sharrock; Evita – Anna Behlmer, Eddy Joseph, Andy Nelson, Ken Weston and Nigel Wright; Independence Day – Bob Beemer, Bill W. Benton, Chris Carpenter, Sandy Gendler, Val Kuklowsky and Jeff Wexler	**Best Special Visual Effects**: **Twister – Stefen Fangmeier, John Frazier, Henry Labounta and Habib Zargarpour**; Independence Day – Tricia Ashford, Volker Engel, Clay Pinney, Douglas Smith and Joe Viskocil; The Nutty Professor – Jon Farhat; Toy Story – Eben Fiske Ostby and William Reeves
**Outstanding British Film**: **Secrets & Lies – Simon Channing Williams and Mike Leigh**; Brassed Off – Steve Abbott and Mark Herman; Carla's Song – Sally Hibbin and Ken Loach; Richard III – Lisa Katselas, Stephen Bayly and Richard Loncraine	**Best Film Not in the English Language**: **Ridicule – Frederic Brillion, Philippe Carcassonne, Gilles Legrand and Patrice Leconte**; Antonia's Line – Hans de Weers and Marleen Gorris; Kolya – Eric Abraham and Jan Svěrák; Nelly and Mr. Arnaud – Alain Sarde and Claude Sautet
**Best Short Animation**: **The Old Lady and the Pigeons – Bernard La Joie, Didier Brunner and Sylvain Chomet**; Famous Fred – John Coates, Catrin Unwin and Joanna Quinn; The Saint Inspector – Richard Hutchinson and Mike Booth; Testament: The Bible in Animation (for episode "Joseph") – Elizabeth Babakhina and Aida Ziablikoua; Testament: The Bible in Animation (for episode "Moses") – Naomi Jones and Gary Hurst; Trainspotter – Christopher Moll, Jeff Newitt and Neville Astley	**Best Short Film**: **Majorettes in Space (Des majorettes dans l'espace) – Carole Scotta and David Fourier**; The Butterfly Man – Robin MacPherson and Barry Ackroyd; Dual Balls – Laurence Bowen and Dan Zeff; Everything Must Go – François Barat and Jean-Marc Moutout; Machination – Alice Beckmann and Ralph Seiler

== Statistics ==
Films that received multiple nominations
Nominations	Film
13	The English Patient
9	Shine
8	Evita
7	Secrets & Lies
6	Fargo
5	Richard III
3	Brassed Off
2	The Crucible
2	Hamlet
2	Independence Day
2	Michael Collins
2	The Nutty Professor

Films that received multiple awards
Awards	Film
6	The English Patient
3	Secrets & Lies
2	Richard III
2	Shine

== See also ==
- 69th Academy Awards
- 22nd César Awards
- 2nd Critics' Choice Awards
- 49th Directors Guild of America Awards
- 10th European Film Awards
- 54th Golden Globe Awards
- 8th Golden Laurel Awards
- 17th Golden Raspberry Awards
- 1st Golden Satellite Awards
- 11th Goya Awards
- 12th Independent Spirit Awards
- 2nd Lumière Awards
- 23rd Saturn Awards
- 3rd Screen Actors Guild Awards
- 49th Writers Guild of America Awards
