= 68th Academy Awards =

- Official poster by Saul Bass
- Date: March 25, 1996
- Site: Dorothy Chandler Pavilion, Los Angeles, California, U.S.
- Hosted by: Whoopi Goldberg
- Produced by: David Salzman; Quincy Jones
- Directed by: Jeff Margolis

Highlights
- Best Picture: Braveheart
- Most awards: Braveheart (5)
- Most nominations: Braveheart (10)

TV in the United States
- Network: ABC
- Duration: 3 hours, 39 minutes
- Ratings: 44.81 million 30.48% (Nielsen ratings)

The 68th Academy Awards ceremony, organized by the Academy of Motion Picture Arts and Sciences (AMPAS), honored the best films of 1995 in the United States and took place on March 25, 1996, at the Dorothy Chandler Pavilion in Los Angeles beginning at 6:00 p.m. PST / 9:00 p.m. EST. During the ceremony, AMPAS presented Academy Awards (commonly referred to as Oscars) in 24 categories. The ceremony, televised in the United States by ABC, was produced by David Salzman and Quincy Jones and directed by Jeff Margolis. Actress Whoopi Goldberg hosted the show for the second time, having previously presided over the 66th ceremony in 1994. Three weeks earlier, in a ceremony held at the Regent Beverly Wilshire Hotel in Beverly Hills, California, on March 2, the Academy Awards for Technical Achievement were presented by host Richard Dreyfuss.

Braveheart won five awards, including Best Picture. Other winners included Apollo 13, Pocahontas, Restoration, and The Usual Suspects with two awards and Anne Frank Remembered, Antonia's Line, Babe, A Close Shave, Dead Man Walking, Leaving Las Vegas, Lieberman in Love, Mighty Aphrodite, One Survivor Remembers, Il Postino: The Postman, and Sense and Sensibility with one. The telecast garnered almost 45 million viewers in the United States.

== Winners and nominees ==
The nominees for the 68th Academy Awards were announced on February 13, 1996, at 5:38 a.m. PST (13:38 UTC) at the Samuel Goldwyn Theater by Arthur Hiller, the president of the academy, and the music producer Quincy Jones. Braveheart led all nominees with ten nominations; Apollo 13 came in second with nine.

The winners were announced during the awards ceremony on March 25, 1996. Braveheart was the ninth film to win Best Picture with no acting nominations. With her Best Supporting Actress win for Mighty Aphrodite, Mira Sorvino became the second consecutive actress to win the aforementioned category for a performance in a film directed by Woody Allen. Best Adapted Screenplay winner Emma Thompson was the first person to win Oscars for both acting and screenwriting. She had previously won Best Actress for her performance in the 1992 film Howards End. This was the first year since the 42nd Academy Awards—and last to date—that none of the acting winners appeared in Best Picture nominees.

=== Awards ===
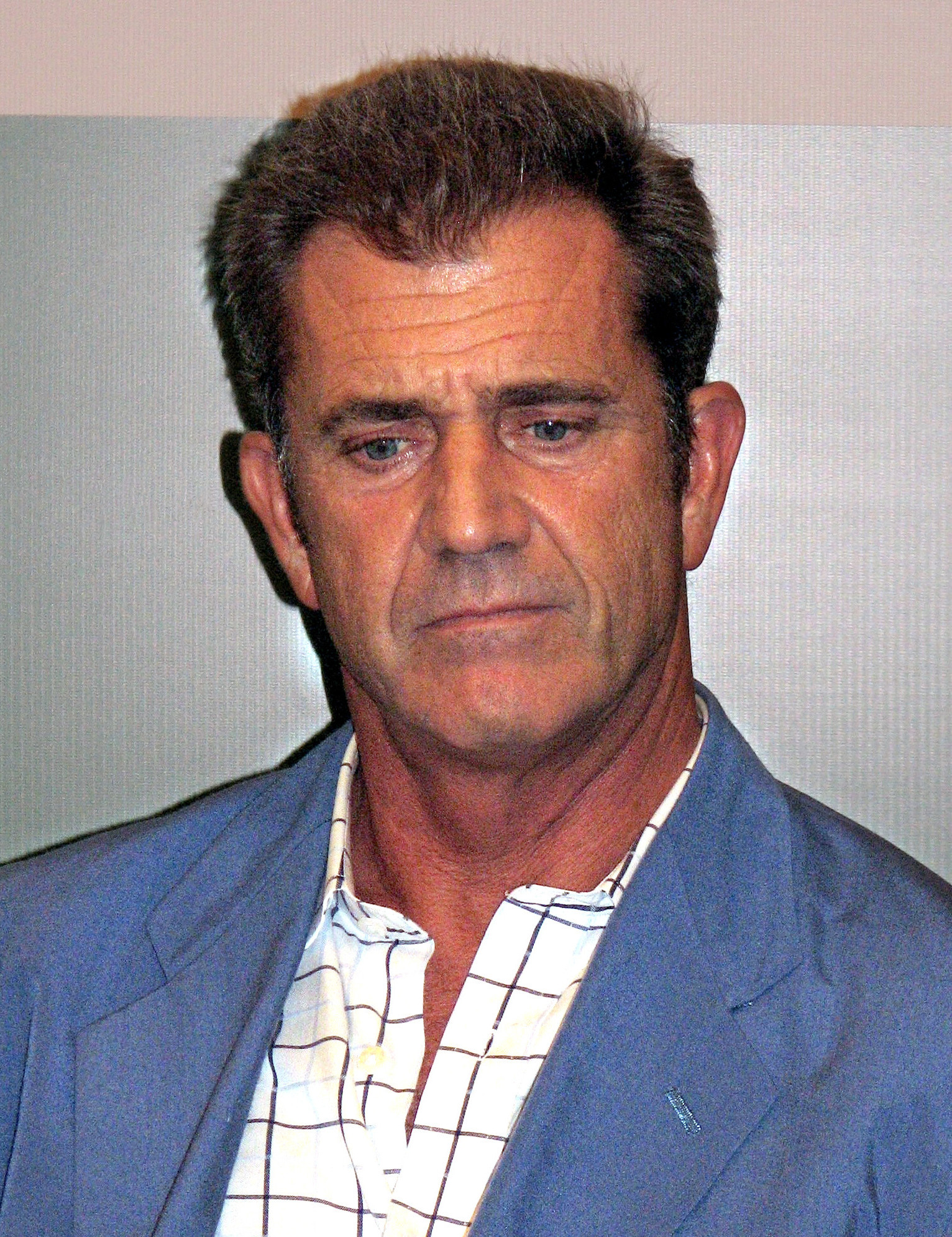
Mel Gibson, Best Picture co-winner and Best Director winner

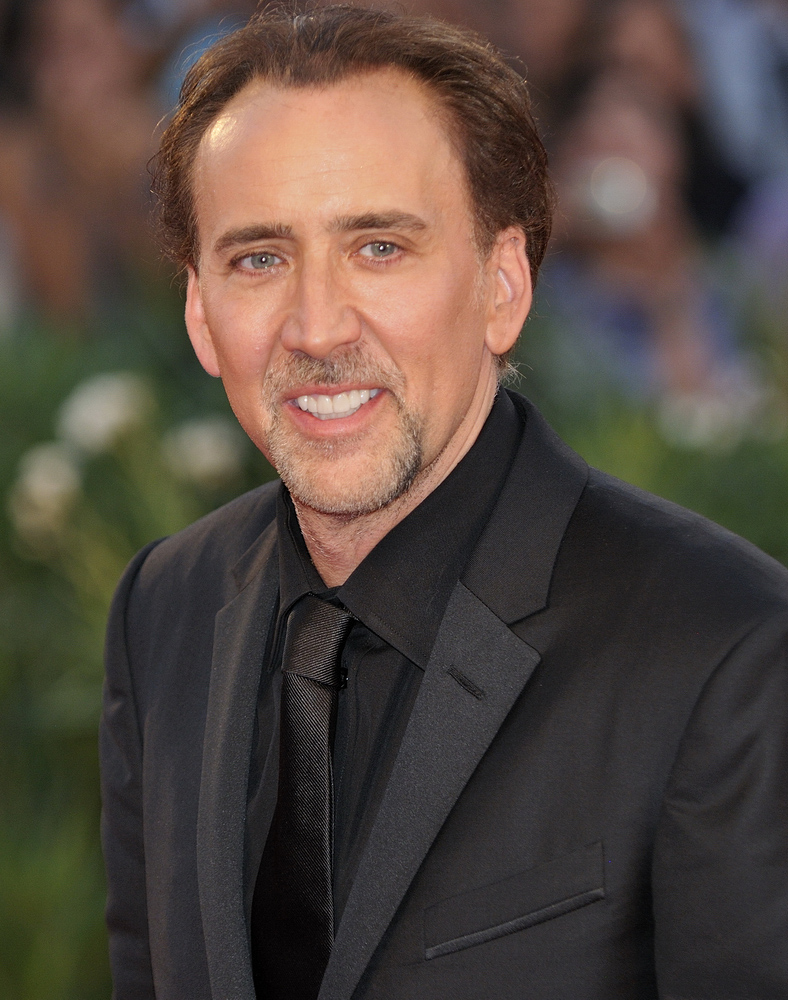
Nicolas Cage, Best Actor winner

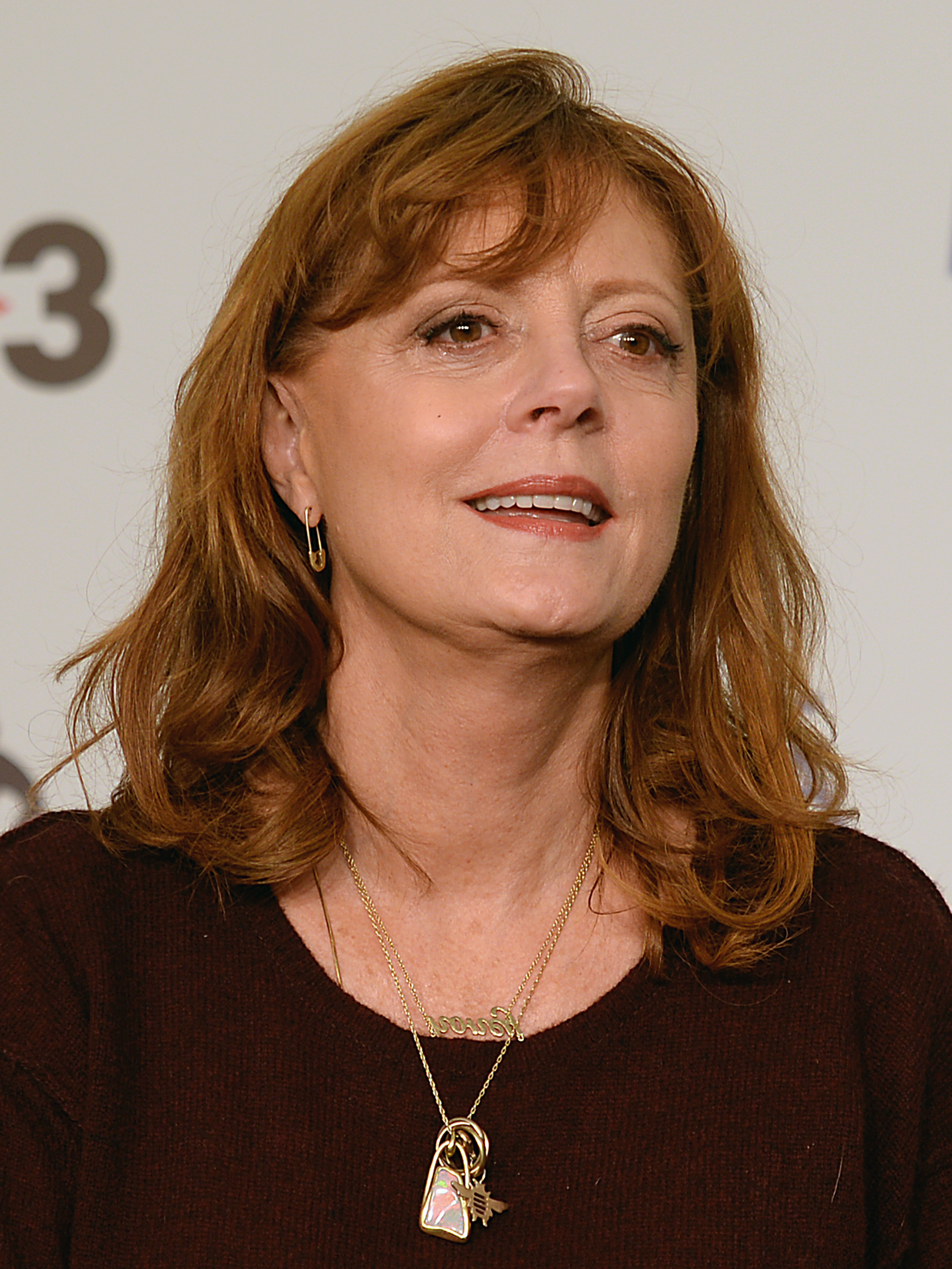
Susan Sarandon, Best Actress winner

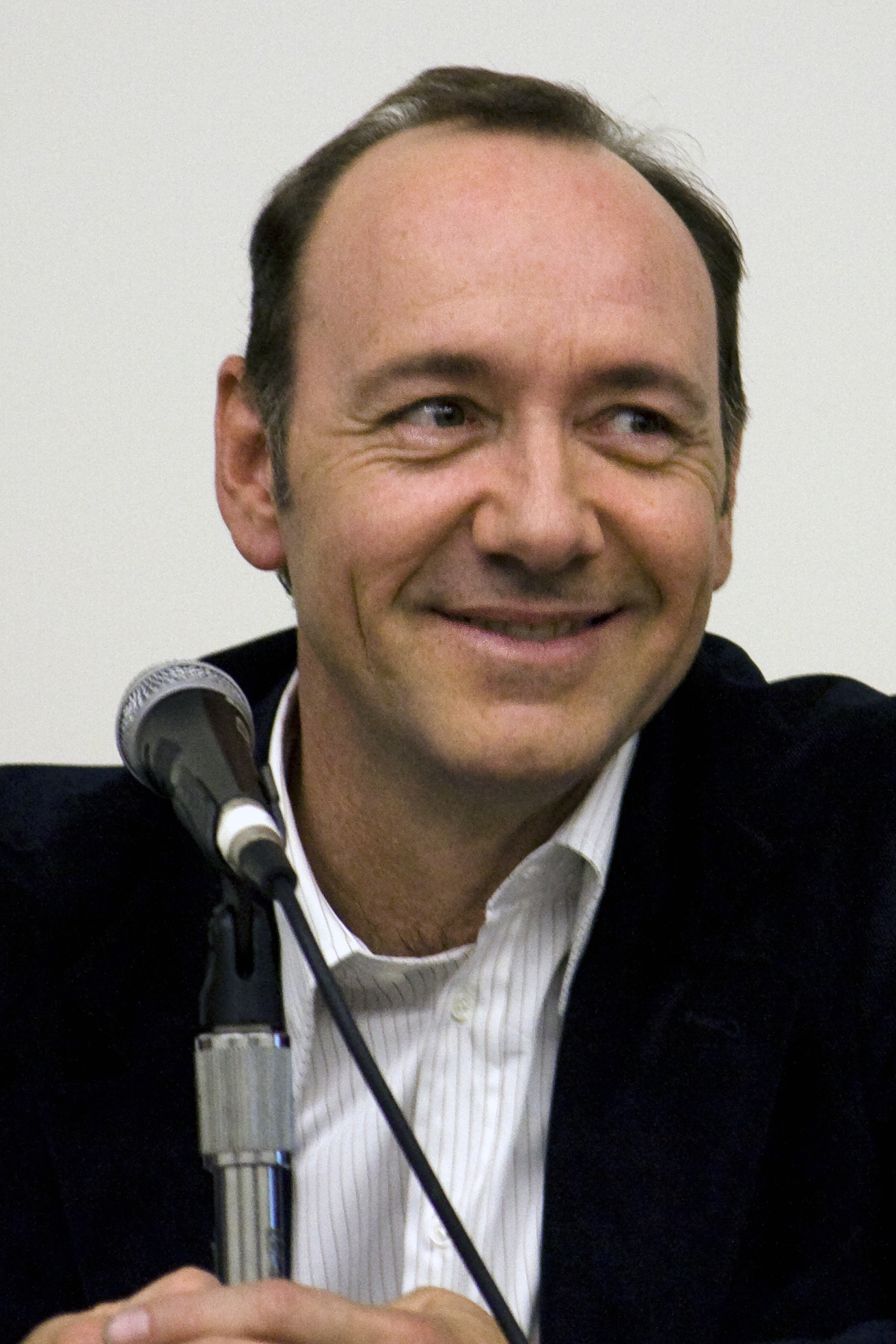
Kevin Spacey, Best Supporting Actor winner

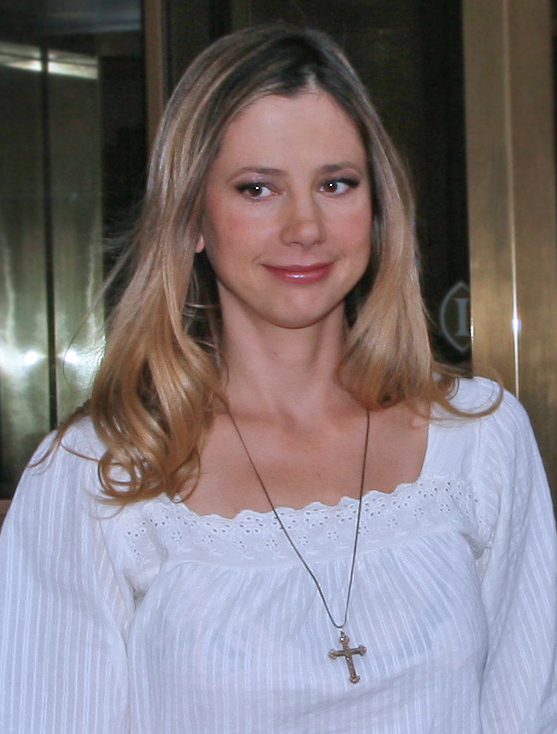
Mira Sorvino, Best Supporting Actress winner

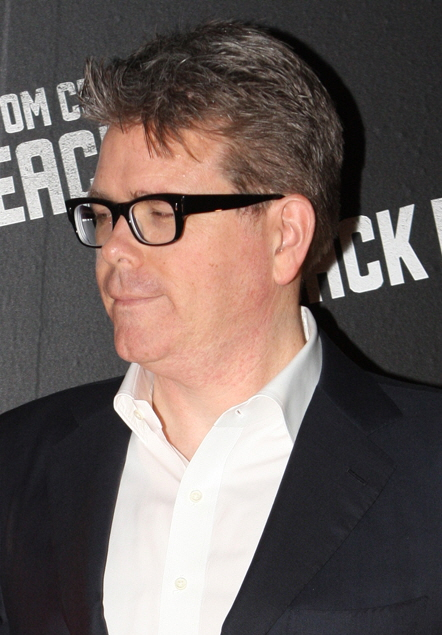
Christopher McQuarrie, Best Original Screenplay winner

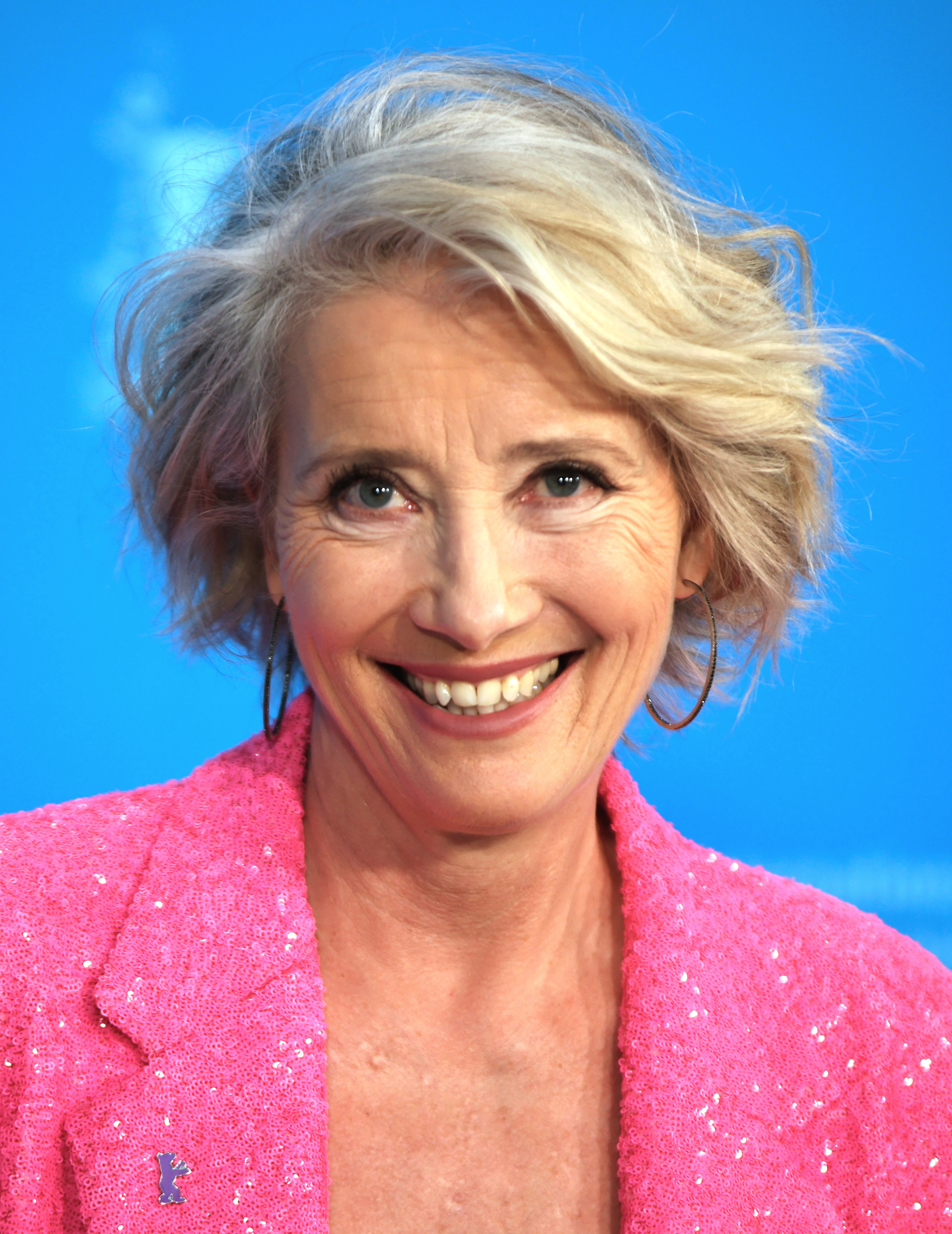
Emma Thompson, Best Adapted Screenplay winner

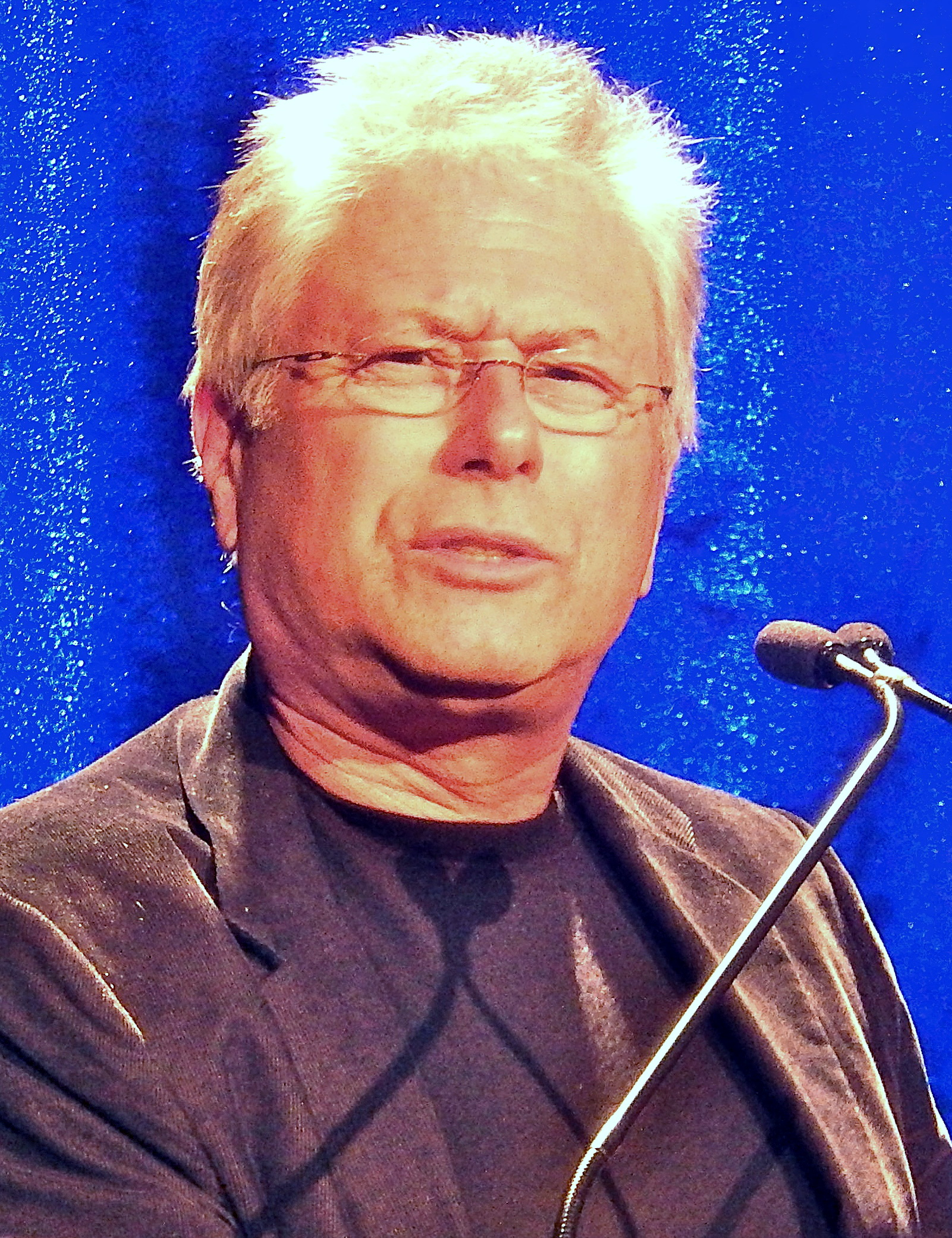
Alan Menken, Best Original Musical or Comedy Score co-winner and Best Original Song co-winner

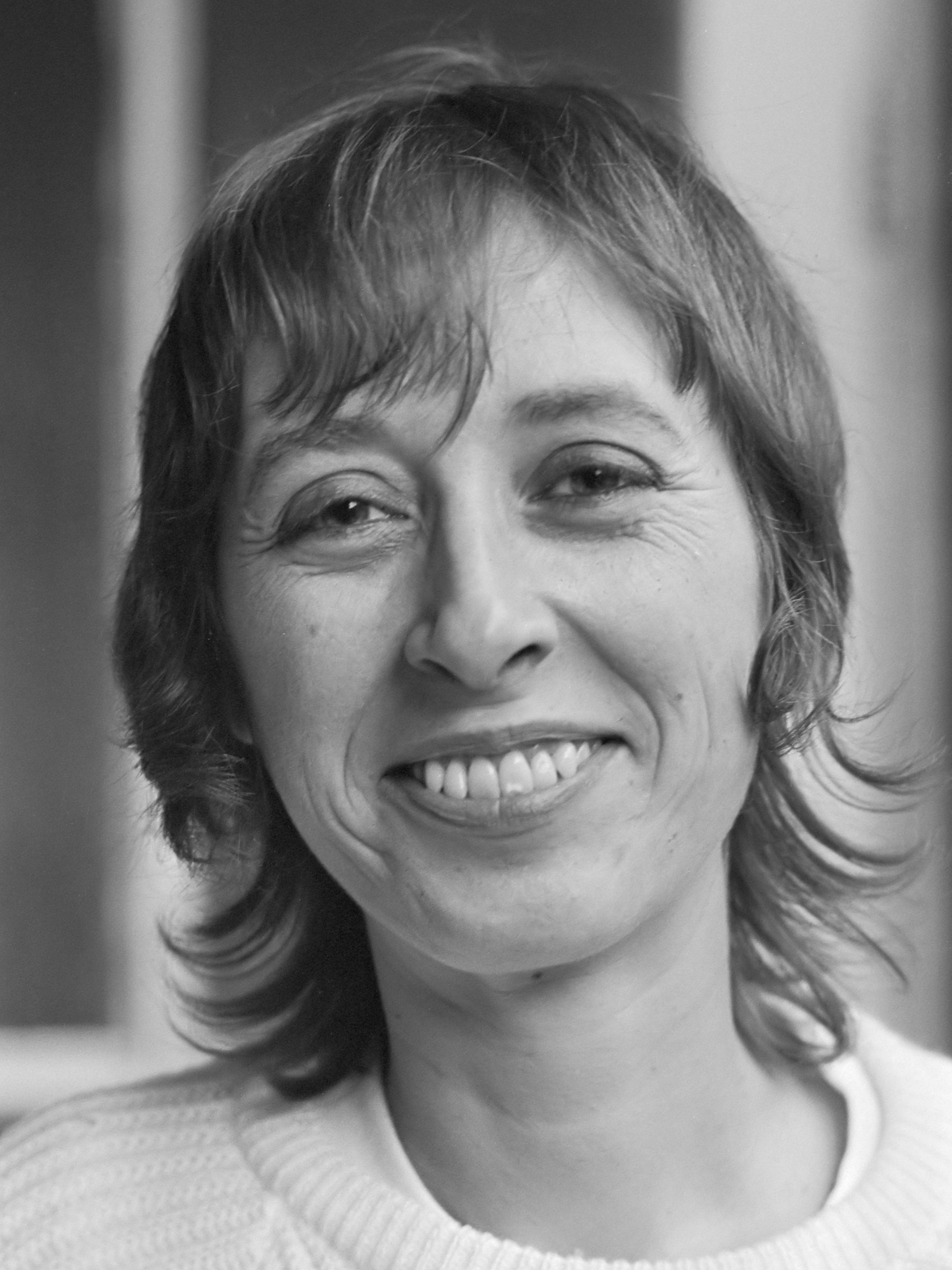
Marleen Gorris, Best Foreign Language Film winner

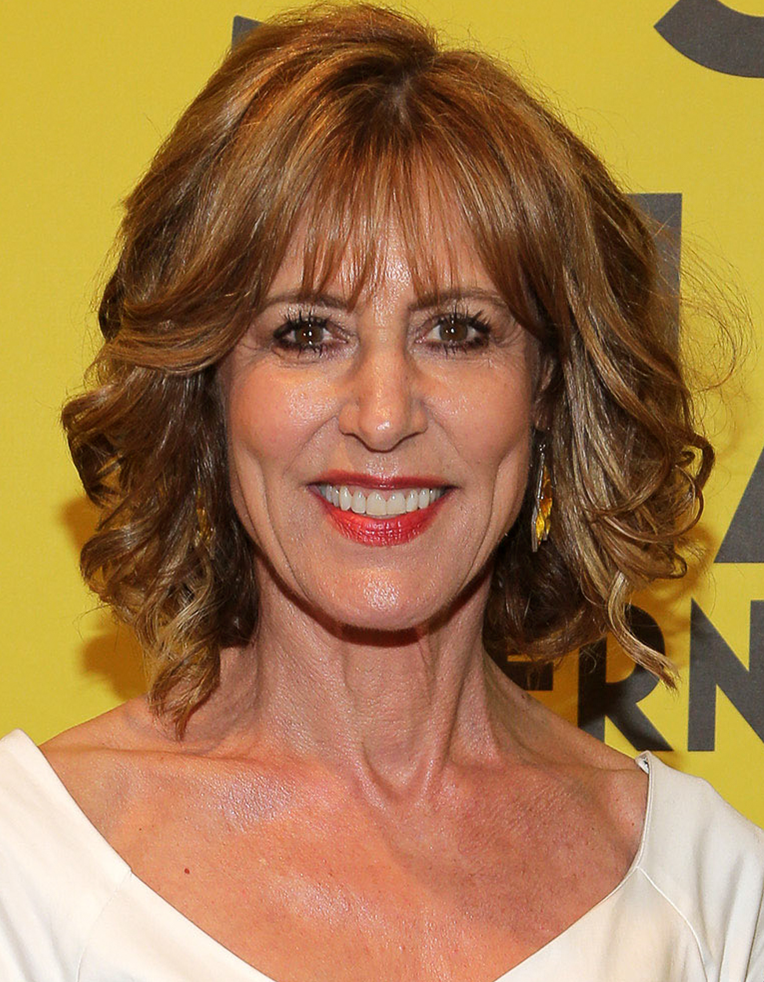
Christine Lahti, Best Live Action Short Film co-winner

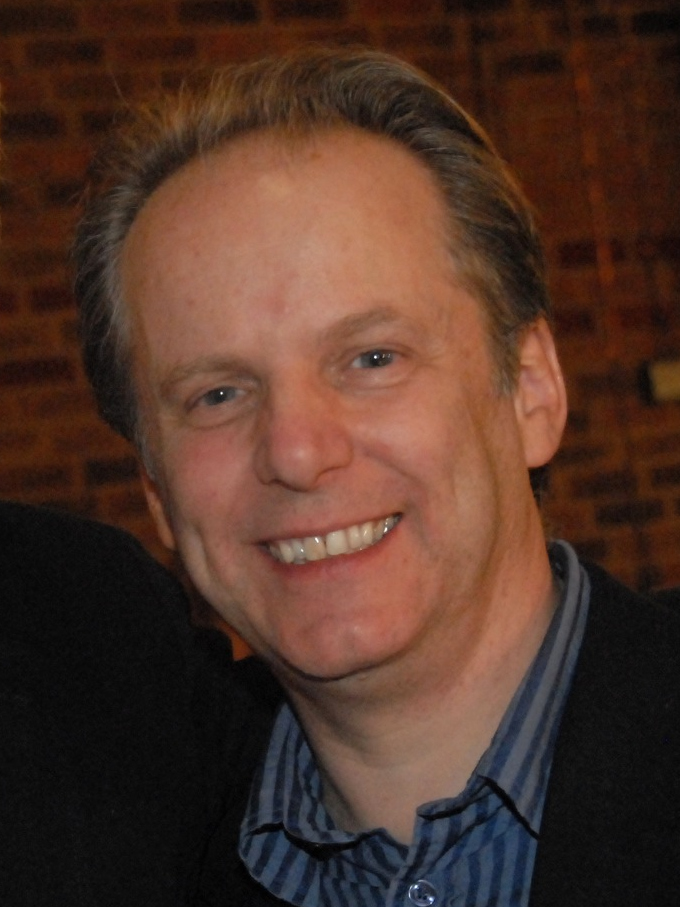
Nick Park, Best Animated Short Film winner

Winners are listed first and highlighted in boldface.

**Best Picture**: **Braveheart – Mel Gibson, Bruce Davey and Alan Ladd Jr., producers**; Apollo 13 – Brian Grazer, producer; Babe – George Miller, Doug Mitchell and Bill Miller, producers; Il Postino: The Postman – Mario Cecchi Gori (posthumous nomination), Vittorio Cecchi Gori and Gaetano Daniele, producers; Sense and Sensibility – Lindsay Doran, producer	**Best Directing**: **Mel Gibson – Braveheart**; Chris Noonan – Babe; Tim Robbins – Dead Man Walking; Mike Figgis – Leaving Las Vegas; Michael Radford – Il Postino: The Postman
**Best Actor in a Leading Role**: **Nicolas Cage – Leaving Las Vegas as Ben Sanderson**; Richard Dreyfuss – Mr. Holland's Opus as Glenn Holland; Anthony Hopkins – Nixon as Richard Nixon; Sean Penn – Dead Man Walking as Matthew Poncelet; Massimo Troisi (posthumous nomination) – Il Postino: The Postman as Mario Ruoppolo	**Best Actress in a Leading Role**: **Susan Sarandon – Dead Man Walking as Helen Prejean**; Elisabeth Shue – Leaving Las Vegas as Sera; Sharon Stone – Casino as Ginger McKenna; Meryl Streep – The Bridges of Madison County as Francesca Johnson; Emma Thompson – Sense and Sensibility as Elinor Dashwood
**Best Actor in a Supporting Role**: **Kevin Spacey – The Usual Suspects as Roger "Verbal" Kint / Keyser Söze**; James Cromwell – Babe as Farmer Arthur Hoggett; Ed Harris – Apollo 13 as Gene Kranz; Brad Pitt – 12 Monkeys as Jeffrey Goines; Tim Roth – Rob Roy as Archibald Cunningham	**Best Actress in a Supporting Role**: **Mira Sorvino – Mighty Aphrodite as Linda Ash**; Joan Allen – Nixon as Pat Nixon; Kathleen Quinlan – Apollo 13 as Marilyn Gerlach Lovell; Mare Winningham – Georgia as Georgia Flood; Kate Winslet – Sense and Sensibility as Marianne Dashwood
**Best Writing (Screenplay Written Directly for the Screen)**: **The Usual Suspects – Christopher McQuarrie**; Braveheart – Randall Wallace; Mighty Aphrodite – Woody Allen; Nixon – Oliver Stone, Christopher Wilkinson and Stephen J. Rivele; Toy Story – Screenplay by Joss Whedon, Andrew Stanton, Joel Cohen and Alec Sokolow; Story by John Lasseter, Pete Docter, Andrew Stanton and Joe Ranft	**Best Writing (Screenplay Based on Material Previously Produced or Published)**: **Sense and Sensibility – Emma Thompson adapted from the novel by Jane Austen**; Apollo 13 – Al Reinert and William Broyles Jr. based on the book Lost Moon by Jim Lovell and Jeffrey Kluger; Babe – George Miller and Chris Noonan based on the book The Sheep-Pig by Dick King-Smith; Leaving Las Vegas – Mike Figgis based on the novel by John O'Brien; Il Postino: The Postman – Michael Radford, Anna Pavignano, Furio Scarpelli, Giacomo Scarpelli and Massimo Troisi (posthumous nomination) based on the novel Ardiente paciencia by Antonio Skármeta
**Best Foreign Language Film**: **Antonia's Line (The Netherlands) in Dutch – Marleen Gorris, director**; All Things Fair (Sweden) in Swedish – Bo Widerberg, director; Dust of Life (Algeria) in French – Rachid Bouchareb, director; O Quatrilho (Brazil) in Portuguese and Italian – Fábio Barreto, director; The Star Maker (Italy) in Italian – Giuseppe Tornatore, director	**Best Documentary (Feature)**: **Anne Frank Remembered – Jon Blair**; The Battle Over Citizen Kane – Thomas Lennon and Michael Epstein; Fiddlefest – Roberta Tzavaras and Her East Harlem Violin Program – Allan Miller and Walter Scheuer; Hank Aaron: Chasing the Dream – Mike Tollin and Fredric Golding; Troublesome Creek: A Midwestern – Jeanne Jordan and Steven Ascher
**Best Documentary (Short Subject)**: **One Survivor Remembers – Kary Antholis**; Jim Dine: A Self-Portrait on the Walls – Nancy Dine and Richard Stilwell; The Living Sea – Greg MacGillivray and Alec Lorimore; Never Give Up: The 20th Century Odyssey of Herbert Zipper – Terry Sanders and Freida Lee Mock; The Shadow of Hate – Charles Guggenheim	**Best Short Film (Live Action)**: **Lieberman in Love – Christine Lahti and Jana Sue Memel**; Brooms – Luke Cresswell and Steve McNicholas; Duke of Groove – Griffin Dunne and Thom Colwell; Little Surprises – Jeff Goldblum and Tikki Goldberg; Tuesday Morning Ride – Dianne Houston and Joy Ryan
**Best Short Film (Animated)**: **A Close Shave – Nick Park**; The Chicken from Outer Space – John R. Dilworth; The End – Chris Landreth and Robin Bargar; Gagarin – Aleksey Kharitidi; Runaway Brain – Chris Bailey	**Best Music (Original Dramatic Score)**: **Il Postino: The Postman – Luis Bacalov**; Apollo 13 – James Horner; Braveheart – James Horner; Nixon – John Williams; Sense and Sensibility – Patrick Doyle
**Best Music (Original Musical or Comedy Score)**: **Pocahontas – Music by Alan Menken; lyrics by Stephen Schwartz; orchestral score by Alan Menken**; The American President – Marc Shaiman; Sabrina – John Williams; Toy Story – Randy Newman; Unstrung Heroes – Thomas Newman	**Best Music (Original Song)**: **"Colors of the Wind" from Pocahontas – Music by Alan Menken; lyrics by Stephen Schwartz**; "Dead Man Walkin'" from Dead Man Walking – Music and lyrics by Bruce Springsteen; "Have You Ever Really Loved a Woman?" from Don Juan DeMarco – Music and lyrics by Michael Kamen, Bryan Adams and Robert John Lange; "Moonlight" from Sabrina – Music by John Williams; lyrics by Alan and Marilyn Bergman; "You've Got a Friend in Me" from Toy Story – Music and lyrics by Randy Newman
**Best Sound**: **Apollo 13 – Rick Dior, Steve Pederson, Scott Millan and David MacMillan**; Batman Forever – Donald O. Mitchell, Frank A. Montaño, Michael Herbick and Petur Hliddal; Braveheart – Andy Nelson, Scott Millan, Anna Behlmer and Brian Simmons; Crimson Tide – Kevin O'Connell, Rick Kline, Gregory H. Watkins and William B. Kaplan; Waterworld – Steve Maslow, Gregg Landaker and Keith A. Wester	**Best Sound Effects Editing**: **Braveheart – Lon Bender and Per Hallberg**; Batman Forever – John Leveque and Bruce Stambler; Crimson Tide – George Watters II
**Best Art Direction**: **Restoration – Art Direction and Set Decoration: Eugenio Zanetti**; Apollo 13 – Art Direction: Michael Corenblith; Set Decoration: Merideth Boswell; Babe – Art Direction: Roger Ford; Set Decoration: Kerrie Brown; A Little Princess – Art Direction: Bo Welch; Set Decoration: Cheryl Carasik; Richard III – Art Direction and Set Decoration: Tony Burrough	**Best Cinematography**: **Braveheart – John Toll**; Batman Forever – Stephen Goldblatt; A Little Princess – Emmanuel Lubezki; Sense and Sensibility – Michael Coulter; Shanghai Triad – Lü Yue
**Best Makeup**: **Braveheart – Peter Frampton, Paul Pattison and Lois Burwell**; My Family, Mi Familia – Ken Diaz and Mark Sanchez; Roommates – Greg Cannom, Bob Laden and Colleen Callaghan	**Best Costume Design**: **Restoration – James Acheson**; 12 Monkeys – Julie Weiss; Braveheart – Charles Knode; Richard III – Shuna Harwood; Sense and Sensibility – Jenny Beavan and John Bright
**Best Film Editing**: **Apollo 13 – Mike Hill and Daniel P. Hanley**; Babe – Marcus D'Arcy and Jay Friedkin; Braveheart – Steven Rosenblum; Crimson Tide – Chris Lebenzon; Seven – Richard Francis-Bruce	**Best Visual Effects**: **Babe – Scott E. Anderson, Charles Gibson, Neal Scanlan and John Cox**; Apollo 13 – Robert Legato, Michael Kanfer, Leslie Ekker and Matt Sweeney

=== Special Achievement Award ===
- To John Lasseter, for his inspired leadership of the Pixar Toy Story team, resulting in the first feature-length computer-animated film.

=== Honorary Awards ===
- To Kirk Douglas, for fifty years as a creative and moral force in the motion picture community.
- To Chuck Jones, for the creation of classic cartoons which have brought worldwide joy for more than half a century.

=== Multiple nominations and awards ===
The following 19 films received multiple nominations:

Nominations	Film
10	Braveheart
9	Apollo 13
7	Babe
7	Sense and Sensibility
5	Il Postino: The Postman
4	Dead Man Walking
4	Leaving Las Vegas
4	Nixon
3	Batman Forever
3	Crimson Tide
3	Toy Story (Note: Not counting the non-competitive Special Achievement Award for Toy Story.)
2	12 Monkeys
2	A Little Princess
2	Mighty Aphrodite
2	Pocahontas
2	Restoration
2	Richard III
2	Sabrina
2	The Usual Suspects

The following five films received multiple awards:

Awards	Film
5	Braveheart
2	Apollo 13
2	Pocahontas
2	Restoration
2	The Usual Suspects

== Presenters and performers ==
The following individuals, listed in order of appearance, presented awards or performed musical numbers.

=== Presenters ===
Name(s)	Role
Les Marshak	Announcer for the 68th annual Academy Awards
Pierce Brosnan; Naomi Campbell; Claudia Schiffer	Presenters of the award for Best Costume Design
Dianne Wiest	Presenter of the award for Best Supporting Actor
John Travolta	Presenter of the film Apollo 13 on the Best Picture segment
Alicia Silverstone	Presenter of the award for Best Makeup
Emma Thompson	Presenter of the award for Best Art Direction
Chris O'Donnell	Introducer of the performance of Best Original Song nominee "Moonlight"
Robin Williams	Presenter of the Honorary Award to Chuck Jones and the Special Achievement Award to John Lasseter who comes onto the stage with a Sheriff Woody doll and a Buzz Lightyear action figure. As they come to life, Tom Hanks and Tim Allen reprise their respective voice roles.
Kareem Abdul-Jabbar; Jackie Chan	Presenters of the awards for Best Live Action Short Film and Best Animated Short Film
Sandra Bullock	Presenter of the award Best Sound Effects Editing
Steven Seagal	Presenter of the award Best Sound
Jeremy Irons	Presenter of the film Braveheart on the Best Picture segment
Martin Landau	Presenter of the award for Best Supporting Actress
Jim Carrey	Presenter of the award for Best Cinematography
Goldie Hawn; Kurt Russell	Presenters of the award for Best Film Editing
Richard Dreyfuss	Presenter of the segment of the Academy Awards for Technical Achievement and the Gordon E. Sawyer Award
Winona Ryder	Introducer of the performance of Best Original Song nominee "Dead Man Walking"
Will Smith	Presenter of the award for Best Visual Effects
Anjelica Huston	Presenter of the film Sense and Sensibility on the Best Picture segment
Nicolas Cage; Elisabeth Shue	Presenters of the awards for Best Documentary Short Subject and Best Documentary Feature
Nathan Lane	Introducer of the performance of Best Original Song nominee "Colors of the Wind"
Mel Gibson	Presenter of the award Best Foreign Language Film
Steven Spielberg	Presenter of the Honorary Award to Kirk Douglas
Quincy Jones; Sharon Stone	Presenters of the awards for Best Original Musical or Comedy Score and Best Original Dramatic Score
Liam Neeson	Presenter of the film Il Postino: The Postman on the Best Picture segment
Arthur Hiller (AMPAS President)	Presenter of the "In Memoriam" tribute
Jimmy Smits	Introducer of the performance of Best Original Song nominee "Have You Ever Really Loved a Woman?"
Susan Sarandon	Presenter of the award for Best Screenplay Written Directly for the Screen
Anthony Hopkins	Presenter of the award for Best Screenplay Based on Material Previously Produced or Published
Christopher Reeve	Presenter of the montage on films that address social issues
Angela Bassett; Laurence Fishburne	Presenters of the award for Best Original Song
Nicole Kidman	Presenter of the film Babe on the Best Picture segment
Robert Zemeckis	Presenter of the award Best Director
Tom Hanks	Presenter of the award for Best Actress
Jessica Lange	Presenter of the award for Best Actor
Sidney Poitier	Presenter of the award for Best Picture

=== Performers ===
Name(s)	Role	Performed
Tom Scott	Musical arranger	Orchestral
Gloria Estefan	Performer	"Moonlight" from Sabrina
Lyle Lovett; Randy Newman	Performers	"You've Got a Friend in Me" from Toy Story
Stomp	Performers	Best Sound Effects Editing montage
Bruce Springsteen	Performer	"Dead Man Walkin'" from Dead Man Walking
Savion Glover	Performer	"Singin' in the Rain" tap-dance tribute to Gene Kelly
Vanessa Williams	Performer	"Colors of the Wind" from Pocahontas
Bryan Adams	Performer	"Have You Ever Really Loved a Woman?" from Don Juan DeMarco
Take 6	Performers	Best Original Song medley

== Ceremony information ==
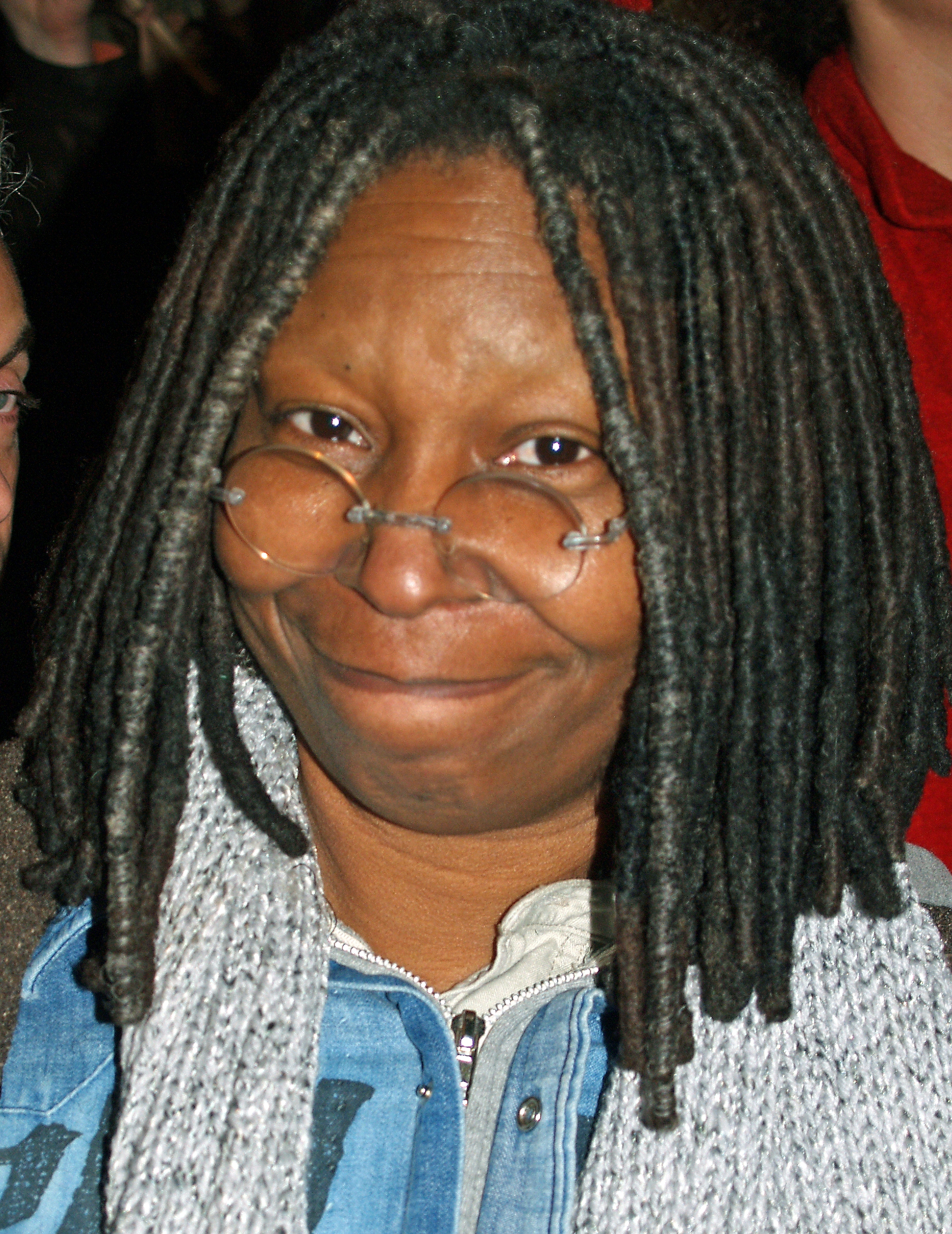
Whoopi Goldberg hosted the 68th Academy Awards.

As a result of the negative reception of David Letterman's stint as host from the preceding year's ceremony, veteran film and television director Gil Cates declined to helm the upcoming festivities. In November 1995, AMPAS recruited music producer and Jean Hersholt Humanitarian Award recipient Quincy Jones as producer of the 1996 ceremony. Jones immediately selected actress and comedian Whoopi Goldberg to host the ceremony. In an interview with Los Angeles Times writer Susan King, Jones explained the decision to hire Goldberg saying, "She has all the qualifications to move on a dime, to carry the elegance and the dignity of the show and is very funny. She understands the street. She has everything."

One segment that was staged during the ceremony was an elaborate fashion show showcasing the nominees for Best Costume Design. Produced by fashion photographer Matthew Rolston, the production featured models such as Cameron Alborzian, Tyson Beckford, Tyra Banks, Marcus Schenkenberg and Joel West sporting various costumes from the five films nominated in the category. Initially, actor Jack Nicholson was approached to introduce the segment along with models Naomi Campbell and Claudia Schiffer. However, actor Pierce Brosnan accepted the role of presenter of the segment and award after Nicholson declined those respective duties.

Several other people and elements were also involved with the production of the ceremony. Jeff Margolis served as director for the program. Actress and talk show host Oprah Winfrey interviewed several nominees and other attendees during a seven-minute red carpet arrival segment shown at the beginning of the telecast. Musician and saxophonist Tom Scott served as musical director for the ceremony. Choreographer Jamie King supervised the performances of the Best Song nominees and two dance numbers. Babe, the pig from the eponymous film, and Miss Piggy participated in a comedy sketch during the proceedings. Actor Christopher Reeve, who was paralyzed in a horse riding accident nearly a year earlier, made a surprise appearance on the telecast urging filmmakers to make movies that face the world's most important issues head-on.

=== Rainbow Coalition protest ===
Several days before the ceremony, activist group Rainbow Coalition, led by Reverend Jesse Jackson, planned a protest regarding African Americans and other racial minorities in the film industry. The group was voicing its objections to unflattering portrayals of minorities in film and television and the fact that minorities were underemployed in the entertainment industry. Jackson further pointed out the disparity in racial minorities in Hollywood by noting that Best Live Action Short Film nominee Dianne Houston was the only African American nominated that year. Although the group initially planned to demonstrate outside the Dorothy Chandler Pavilion, an agreement between Jackson and producer Jones caused the protest to be moved adjacent to the broadcast facilities of the local ABC affiliate KABC-TV. Nevertheless, Jones remarked that the Academy Awards were not the appropriate venue for such protest declaring "Why should the movie business be different from anything else in America? It's a problem that permeates everything in the country. Every facet of America discriminates."

=== Division of Best Original Score category ===
Beginning with this ceremony, the AMPAS music branch divided the category of Best Original Score into two categories: Best Dramatic Score and Best Musical or Comedy Score. This was seen as a response to the dominance of Walt Disney Feature Animation films in the Original Score and Original Song categories in recent years. Four years later, the two scoring categories were merged back into one category.

=== Christopher Reeve appearance ===
At the ceremony, Christopher Reeve presented a montage of films which tackled social issues. His appearance was a surprise to the majority of those present and occurred less than a year after the horse-riding accident in which he was paralyzed. Reeve's appearance was kept secret in part so that if any physical issue came about, he could drop out quietly. He attended an early morning closed-door rehearsal, during which he vetoed the idea of using John Williams' 1978 Superman Theme as entrance music. Reeve, along with Jones, had chosen the film clips used in the montage. Reeve received a two-minute standing ovation during his appearance.

=== Box office performance of nominees ===
At the time of the nominations announcement on February 13, the combined gross of the five Best Picture nominees at the US box office was $333 million, with an average of $66.5 million per film. Apollo 13 was the highest earner among the Best Picture nominees with $172 million in domestic box office receipts. The film was followed by Braveheart ($67 million), Babe ($58.2 million), Sense and Sensibility ($24.6 million) and finally Il Postino: The Postman ($10.7 million).

Of the top 50 grossing movies of the year, 47 nominations went to 14 films on the list. Only Toy Story (2nd), Apollo 13 (3rd), Braveheart (23rd), Babe (29th), 12 Monkeys (31st), Casino (38th) and Mr. Holland's Opus (39th) were nominated for directing, acting, screenwriting, or Best Picture. The other box office hits that earned nominations were Batman Forever (1st), Pocahontas (4th), Seven (9th), Crimson Tide (10th), Waterworld (12th), The Bridges of Madison County (21st), The American President (27th) and Sabrina (34th).

=== Critical reviews ===
The show received a positive reception from most media publications. The New York Times film critic Janet Maslin raved, "Mr. Jones pointedly turned this year's ceremony into a showcase for Hollywood's new guard." She also praised host Goldberg's opening monologue, remarking that it "established the sharpness of this year's gag writing." People columnist Janice Min wrote that "the most egregious crime at the 68th Academy Awards on March 25 was–egad!–the relentless elegance and good taste that deprived viewers of genuine, Grade A snicker fodder. Television critic Howard Rosenberg of the Los Angeles Times applauded Goldberg's performance, noting that her "confident performance [...] was symbolic of her whopping improvement as host over her showing on the 1994 Oscars."

Some media outlets were more critical of the show. Chicago Tribune television critic Steve Johnson lamented that Goldberg "settled into bland script reading that made one long for David Letterman's cranky unpredictability in the role last year." He also stated that the "Best Costume Design fashion show" was the silliest opening Oscar production number since Rob Lowe and Snow White sang "Proud Mary" in 1989. Ken Tucker of Entertainment Weekly bemoaned that the dominance of Best Picture winner Braveheart and the lack of fashion glamour "had the makings of a tiresome evening."

=== Ratings and reception ===
The American telecast on ABC drew in an average of 44.81 million people over its length, which was a 9% decrease from the previous year's ceremony. The show also garnered lower Nielsen ratings compared to the previous ceremony, with 30.48% of households watching over a 48.88 share. It also earned a lower 18–49 demographic rating with an 18.76 rating over a 35.27 share among viewers in that demographic.

In July 1996, the ceremony presentation received seven nominations at the 48th Primetime Emmys. Two months later, the ceremony won one of those nominations for Greg Brunton's lighting design and direction during the telecast.

== "In Memoriam" ==
The annual "In Memoriam" tribute was presented by Academy President Arthur Hiller. The montage featured an excerpt of the main title of The Prince of Tides composed by James Newton Howard.

- Miklós Rózsa – Composer
- Ginger Rogers
- Maxine Andrews
- Michael V. Gazzo
- Dean Martin
- Viveca Lindfors
- Martin Balsam
- Friz Freleng – Animator
- Burl Ives
- Butterfly McQueen
- Dorothy Jeakins – Costume Designer
- Nancy Kelly
- Lana Turner
- Elisha Cook Jr.
- Ida Lupino
- Harry Horner – Art Director
- Terry Southern – Writer
- Haing S. Ngor
- Michael Hordern
- Don Simpson – Producer
- Ross Hunter – Producer
- Frank Perry – Director
- Alexander Godunov
- Louis Malle – Director
- Howard Koch – Writer
- George Burns

A separate tribute to actor, dancer and veteran Oscar host Gene Kelly featured tap dancer Savion Glover dancing to the song "Singin' in the Rain" from the 1952 film of the same name.

== See also ==
- 2nd Screen Actors Guild Awards
- 16th Golden Raspberry Awards
- 38th Grammy Awards
- 48th Primetime Emmy Awards
- 49th British Academy Film Awards
- 50th Tony Awards
- 53rd Golden Globe Awards
- List of submissions to the 68th Academy Awards for Best Foreign Language Film

== Bibliography ==
- Bona, Damien (2002). Inside Oscar 2. New York, United States: Ballantine Books. ISBN 0-345-44970-3.
- Levy, Emanuel (2003). All About Oscar: The History and Politics of the Academy Awards. New York, United States: Continuum International Publishing Group. ISBN 0-8264-1452-4.
- Pond, Steve (2005). The Big Show: High Times and Dirty Dealings Backstage at the Academy Awards. New York, United States: Faber and Faber. ISBN 0-571-21193-3.
