= Shuna Harwood =

British costume designer (born 1940)

- Born: 1940 (age 85–86); Essex, England
- Occupation: Costume designer
- Years active: 1977–2006

Shuna Harwood (born 1940) is a British costume designer. Her accolades include a BAFTA Award, in addition to a nomination for an Academy Award.

Beside her career as costume designer in the film industry, Harwood also worked as a fashion illustrator and a writer/illustrator of children's books.

== Costume design ==
Harwood designed the costumes for Ian McKellen's 1995 film production of Richard III, which was set in a fictional version of England in 1934. McKellen noted that Harwood's approach to using original vintage clothing was beneficial: "It’s very helpful to put people in clothes which tell something about their personalities, their professions, and their social standing". Later critics have commented on the "beautiful 1930s look" of the costumes, including slinky evening gowns and military detailing.

Harwood received the BAFTA award for Best Costume Design for her work on Richard III.

== Filmography ==
=== Film ===
Year	Title	Director	Notes
1977	Full Circle	Richard Loncraine	
1978	The Odd Job	Peter Medak	
1980	Bad Timing	Nicolas Roeg	Additional costumes
1982	Brimstone and Treacle	Richard Loncraine	
1982	The Missionary	Richard Loncraine	
1984	Sword of the Valiant	Stephen Weeks	
1985	Insignificance	Nicolas Roeg	
1987	Personal Services	Terry Jones	
1987	Wish You Were Here	David Leland	
1987	Aria	Nicolas Roeg	Segment: "Un ballo in maschera"
1988	Track 29	Nicolas Roeg	
1991	A Demon in My View	Petra Haffter	
1995	Richard III	Richard Loncraine	
1997	Passion in the Desert	Lavinia Currier	
1998	The Land Girls	David Leland	
1999	Notting Hill	Roger Michell	
2001	Bride of the Wind	Bruce Beresford	
2006	Firewall	Richard Loncraine	

=== Television ===
Year	Title	Notes
1992	Double Vision	Television film
1994	The Dwelling Place	3 episodes

== Awards and nominations ==
Award	Year (Note: Indicates the year of ceremony. Each year is linked to the article about the awards held that year, wherever possible.)	Category	Work	Result	Ref.
Academy Awards	1996	Best Costume Design	Richard III	Nominated	
British Academy Film Awards	1997	Best Costume Design	Richard III	Won	
