= Elvis Presley: The Searcher =

- Film poster
- Directed by: Thom Zimny
- Written by: Alan Light
- Produced by: Jon Landau; Thom Zimny; Kary Antholis
- Cinematography: Luke Geissbuhler
- Edited by: Anoosh Tertzakian; Thom Zimny
- Music by: Mike McCready
- Production company: Old Farm Road Films
- Distributed by: HBO Documentary Films; Sony Pictures Television
- Release dates: March 2018 (SXSW); April 14, 2018 (HBO)
- Running time: 215 minutes
- Country: United States
- Language: English

Elvis Presley: The Searcher is a 2018 television documentary film produced by HBO Documentary Films about the life of American singer Elvis Presley, highlighting the development of his musical artistry. Co-edited, co-produced, and directed by Thom Zimny, the documentary premiered at the 2018 South by Southwest Film Festival in two parts on March 14 and 15, 2018, before airing on HBO in its entirety on April 14.

== Production ==
In 2014, Priscilla Presley, the ex-wife of American musician Elvis Presley, began discussing with the singer's close friend Jerry Schilling the prospect of an honest telling of Elvis' story through his music. The two soon approached HBO Miniseries president Kary Antholis with their plan, which he ardently agreed to, enough so that he and the network reached out to producer Jon Landau to jumpstart the project.

Landau brought in Thom Zimny as the director, having worked together for nearly two decades on Bruce Springsteen documentaries. Landau thought of the title Elvis Presley: The Searcher upon hearing Priscilla's comment about Elvis as "a searcher".

== Marketing ==
The photo of Elvis Presley used as the documentary's key image is from a test shoot for his 1960 film Flaming Star, in which he wore brown contact lenses to assess if it was a better fit for his role as a half-Native American character, as Elvis had naturally blue eyes; this plan was discarded, however, when they began shooting the film. The test shoot photo was chosen to represent The Searcher for its "unearthly quality".

== Reception ==
=== Critical response ===
On Rotten Tomatoes, the film has an approval rating of 96% based on 25 reviews, with an average rating of 7.50/10. The website's critics consensus reads: "Elvis Presley: The Searcher delves into an American icon's early career with patience and skill, delivering a lengthy close-up look that should satisfy fans of all persuasions. "
