= Tasso Katselas =

American architect

Tasso Katselas (born 1927) is an architect in the United States known for his modernist concrete buildings especially in Pittsburgh, Pennsylvania. His work includes Pittsburgh International Airport, public housing, and mansions. His firm was known as Tasso Katselas Associates and became TKA when he semi-retired in 2005 while continuing to consult for the firm.

Katselas' parents immigrated to the United States from Greece. His work includes public housing and civic structures.

He grew up in East Pittsburgh and studied architecture at the Carnegie Institute of Technology (now Carnegie Mellon). He taught at Kansas State College and designed a chapel for the Fallingwater property after Frank Lloyd Wright recommended him to Liliane Kaufmann for the design of a chapel but she died and the project was never built. He opened his own architectural firm in Pittsburgh in 1955.

He designed a house for his family that was built in 1964.

== Personal life ==
Katselas married Jane Banning in 1951. They have two daughters, Dana and Lisa. Lisa Katselas is a film producer and college professor.

== Work ==
- Manchester Bidwell Corporation
- New terminal building, Pittsburgh International Airport
- Carnegie Science Center
- Pittsburgh Technical College
- Community College of Allegheny County
- Saint Vincent College monastery and college master plan after a major fire
- Katselas house
- Allegheny Commons East
- Information Sciences Building, University of Pittsburgh School of Computing and Information, previously the home of the former School of Information Science and originally the American Institutes for Research Building. Brutalist
