= Gerda Weissmann Klein =

Concentration camp survivor (1924–2022)

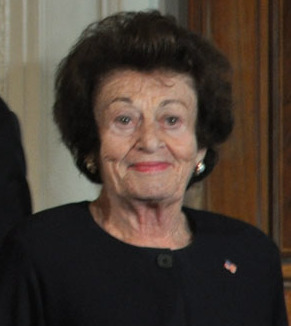
- Klein in 2011
- Born: Gerda Weissmann; May 8, 1924; Bielsko, Poland
- Died: April 3, 2022 (aged 97); Phoenix, Arizona, U.S.
- Occupations: Writer, human rights activist
- Spouse: Kurt Klein (m. 1946; died 2002)
- Children: 3
- Writing career
- Notable works: All But My Life; The Hours After: Letters of Love and Longing in War's Aftermath; One Survivor Remembers

Gerda Weissmann Klein (May 8, 1924 – April 3, 2022) was a Polish-born American writer and human rights activist. Her autobiographical account of the Holocaust, All But My Life (1957), was adapted for the 1995 short film One Survivor Remembers, which received an Academy Award and an Emmy Award, and was selected for the National Film Registry. Weissmann married Kurt Klein (1920–2002) in 1946.

The Kleins became advocates of Holocaust education and human rights, dedicating most of their lives to promoting tolerance and community service. A proud naturalized U.S. citizen, Weissmann Klein founded Citizenship Counts, a 501(c)(3) nonprofit organization that champions the value and responsibilities of American citizenship. She served on the governing board of the United States Holocaust Memorial Museum, which features her testimony in a permanent exhibit.

On February 15, 2011, Klein was presented with the Presidential Medal of Freedom, the highest civilian award in the United States.

== Early life ==
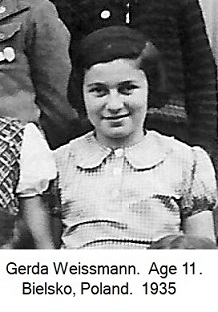
Weismann as a child

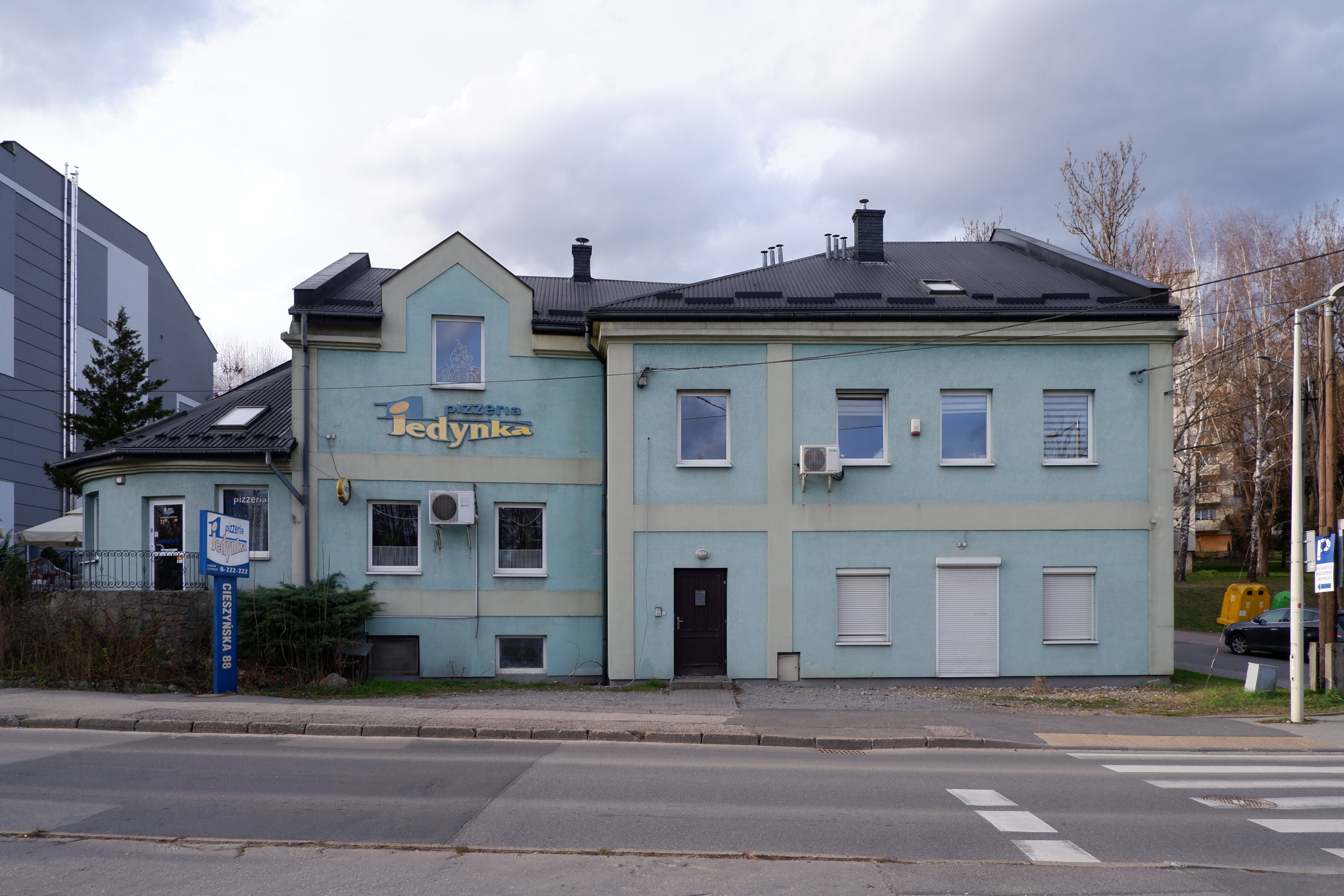
Gerda Weissmann Klein's birthplace in 2025 (the house has been extensively rebuilt since the 1930s)

Gerda Weissmann, the second child of manufacturing executive Julius Weissmann and Helene (née Mueckenbrunn) Weissmann, was born May 8, 1924, in Bielsko (now Bielsko-Biała), Poland. She attended Notre Dame Gymnasium in Bielsko until the Germans invaded Poland in 1939. Both of her parents, along with her older brother Arthur (b. 1919), were murdered in the Holocaust.

== Life under the Nazis ==
On September 3, 1939, German troops invaded 15-year-old Weissmann's home in Bielsko, Poland. Shortly after the invasion began, the family received a telegram from Gerda's uncle saying the Germans were advancing quickly, and the family should leave Poland immediately. They stayed because Gerda's father had suffered a heart attack. His doctors advised that he not be moved or subjected to undue stress.

In 1942, Julius Weissmann was sent to a death camp where he was murdered. Not long afterwards, the ghetto where Weissmann Klein and her mother lived was liquidated. Helene Weissman was forced into a group slated for a death camp; Gerda, deemed fit for work, was sent to a labor camp. As she and others boarded trucks, Gerda jumped out in a frantic effort to reunite with her mother. According to Weissmann Klein's account, Moshe Merin, head of the local Jewish Council Judenrat, threw her back in her truck, saying: "You are too young to die."

In the Netflix documentary World War II: From the Frontlines she describes that after a death march the SS locked her together with about a hundred women in a factory (near Volary), and locked the doors, and lined it with explosives and a timer to kill all the women, but due to the rain the timer did not work.

=== Liberation ===
In May 1945, Weissmann was liberated by forces of the United States Army in Volary, Czechoslovakia; these forces included Lieutenant Kurt Klein, who was born in Germany. A teenage Klein immigrated to the United States in 1937 to escape Nazism. Klein's parents were murdered at Auschwitz concentration camp. When Kurt Klein first encountered Gerda Weissmann, it was the day before her 21st birthday, and she was white-haired, weighed 68 pounds (31 kg), and dressed in rags. When Weissmann hesitantly informed Klein she was a Jew, he emotionally revealed that he was Jewish as well. After a courtship of several months, Gerda and Kurt were engaged in September 1945. Diplomatic and immigration restrictions delayed their wedding for a year, but Kurt finally returned to Europe from the U.S. in 1946 and they were married in Paris.

== Life after the war ==
After the war, the Kleins moved to and raised their three children in Buffalo, New York, where Kurt ran a printing business and Gerda became a writer and spent 17 years as a columnist for The Buffalo News.

The documentary, One Survivor Remembers (1995), based on Weissmann Klein's autobiography, All But My Life, produced and directed by Kary Antholis, and distributed by HBO Films, won the 1995 Academy Award for Best Documentary (Short Subject). After Antholis delivered his acceptance speech, Weissmann Klein stepped up to the podium and delivered her own set of remarks:

I have been in a place for six incredible years where winning meant a crust of bread and to live another day. Since the blessed day of my liberation I have asked the question, why am I here? I am no better. In my mind's eye I see those years and days and those who never lived to see the magic of a boring evening at home. On their behalf I wish to thank you for honoring their memory, and you cannot do it in any better way than when you return to your homes tonight to realize that each of you who know the joy of freedom are winners.

Weissmann Klein published several memoirs and children's stories, including The Windsor Caper (2013), a weekly serial in The Buffalo News during the 1980s, about two American girls, named for her two eldest granddaughters Alysa and Julie, who have a night-time adventure in Windsor Castle, England. Weissmann Klein describes it as her only work that is "not rooted in pain".

Weissmann Klein lived in Buffalo for several decades until her husband Kurt retired and they moved to Arizona in 1985 to be closer to their children and grandchildren. She died in Phoenix on April 3, 2022, at age 97.

== Meaningful Work ==
Along with her granddaughter Alysa Cooper, she co-founded Citizenship Counts in 2008. The organization is a national, 501(c)(3) non-profit that was established so she could give back in small measure to her adopted country for all of the privileges she received after becoming a U.S. citizen. Its mission is to educate today’s youth on the tenets of citizenship, teach them to appreciate their rights and responsibilities as Americans and give them a chance to celebrate with new citizens by hosting a naturalization ceremony or celebration of citizenship at their school.

As the Founder, Gerda Weissmann Klein describes her passion for giving back through Citizenship Counts as such: “To perpetuate the miracle that is America, we must teach our children about its rich history as a nation of immigrants who chose this country and have given meaning to its ideals. Citizenship Counts will engage today’s students in civics education, combined with active participation in a naturalization ceremony, to help ensure that the citizens of tomorrow will continue to foster tolerance, understanding, service to one another, and a greater appreciation for the privilege and responsibility of citizenship.”

== Awards and recognition ==
=== Presidential Medal of Freedom ===
On February 15, 2011, President Barack Obama presented Weissmann Klein and 14 other recipients with the 2010 Presidential Medal of Freedom, the highest civilian award in the United States. At the ceremony in the East Room of the White House, President Obama announced, "This year's Medal of Freedom recipients reveal the best of who we are and who we aspire to be." He stated the following as Klein was presented with her Presidential Medal of Freedom:

By the time she was 21, Gerda Klein had spent six years living under Nazi rule—three of them in concentration camps. Her parents and brother had been taken away. Her best friend had died in her arms during a 350-mile [560 km] death march. And she weighed only 68 pounds [31 kg] when she was found by American forces in an abandoned bicycle factory. But Gerda survived. She married the soldier who rescued her. And ever since—as an author, a historian, and a crusader for tolerance—she has taught the world that it is often in our most hopeless moments that we discover the extent of our strength and the depth of our love.

President Obama then read a statement from Weissmann Klein: "I pray you never stand at any crossroads in your own lives, but if you do, if the darkness seems so total, if you think there is no way out, remember, never ever give up."

=== Additional recognition ===
Weissmann Klein was selected to be the keynote speaker at the United Nations' first annual International Holocaust Remembrance Day in January 2006. She spoke to school children in all 50 U.S. states and countless countries worldwide to spread her message of tolerance and hope, meeting with many world leaders and dignitaries such as Eleanor Roosevelt, Menachem Begin and Golda Meir. Gerda and her husband Kurt were invited to speak to the students at Columbine soon after the tragedy in April 1999. They made multiple visits to the community to help the students and their families manage their fears in the aftermath of the horrific attack.

In 1996, Weissmann Klein received the international Lion of Judah award in Jerusalem. She received 7 Honorary Doctorates throughout her lifetime.

In 1997, President Bill Clinton appointed Weissmann Klein to the United States Holocaust Memorial Museum's Governing Council. In 2007, the museum bestowed Weissmann Klein with its highest honor at The Arizona Biltmore before 1,000 guests. She was inducted into the Arizona Women's Hall of Fame in 2021.

== Bibliography ==
- 1957: All But My Life. New York: Hill & Wang, 1957; All But My Life. A Memoir, expanded edition 1995. ISBN 0809024608.
- 1974: The Blue Rose. Photographs by Norma Holt. New York: L. Hill, 1974. ISBN 0882080474.
- 1981: Promise of a New Spring: The Holocaust and Renewal. Illustrated by Vincent Tartaro. Chappaqua, N.Y.: Rossel Books, 1981. ISBN 0940646501.
- 1984: A Passion for Sharing: The Life of Edith Rosenwald Stern. Chappaqua, N.Y.: Rossel, 1984. ISBN 0940646153.
- 1986: Peregrinations: Adventures with the Green Parrot. Illustrations by Chabela. Buffalo, N.Y.: Josephine Goodyear Committee, 1986. ISBN 096166990X.
- 2000: The Hours After: Letters of Love and Longing in the War's Aftermath. Written with Kurt Klein. New York: St. Martin's Press, 2000. ISBN 0312242581.
- 2004: A Boring Evening at Home. Washington, D.C.: Leading Authorities Press, 2004. ISBN 0971007888.
- 2007: Wings of EPOH. Illustrated by Peter Reynolds. [S.l.]: FableVision Press, 2007. ISBN 1891405497.
- 2009: One Raspberry. Illustrated by Judy Hodge. Klein, 2009. ISBN 0615356230.
- 2013: The Windsor Caper. Illustrated by Tim Oliver. Martin Good, 2013. ISBN 9780956921352.

== Filmography ==
- 1995: One Survivor Remembers
- 1996: 60 Minutes: "One Survivor Remembers" CBS
- 2005: About Face: The Story of the Jewish Refugee Soldiers of World War II
- 2023: World War II: From the Frontlines (Netflix)
