= Richard III (1995 film) =

1995 Shakespearean film by Richard Loncraine

- Theatrical poster
- Directed by: Richard Loncraine
- Written by: Ian McKellen; Richard Loncraine
- Story by: Richard Eyre
- Based on: Richard III by William Shakespeare
- Produced by: Stephen Bayly; Lisa Katselas Paré
- Starring: Ian McKellen; Annette Bening; Jim Broadbent; Robert Downey Jr.; Nigel Hawthorne; Kristin Scott Thomas; Maggie Smith; John Wood
- Cinematography: Peter Biziou
- Edited by: Paul Green
- Music by: Trevor Jones
- Production companies: United Artists; Bayly/Paré Productions; British Screen; First Look International
- Distributed by: MGM/UA Distribution Co. (United States and Canada); Guild Film Distribution (United Kingdom and Ireland)
- Release date: 29 December 1995
- Running time: 104 minutes
- Countries: United Kingdom; United States
- Language: English
- Budget: £6 million
- Box office: $2.7 million

Richard III is a 1995 film adaptation of William Shakespeare's play of the same name. Directed by Richard Loncraine, the film adapts the play's story and characters to a setting based on 1930s Britain, with Richard depicted as a fascist plotting to usurp the throne. Ian McKellen portrays the title character, as well as co-writing the screenplay with Loncraine.

The cast also includes Annette Bening as Queen Elizabeth, Jim Broadbent as the Duke of Buckingham, Robert Downey Jr. as Rivers, Kristin Scott Thomas as Anne Neville, Nigel Hawthorne as the Duke of Clarence, Maggie Smith as the Duchess of York, John Wood as King Edward IV, Tim McInnerny as Sir William Catesby, and Dominic West (in his film debut) as Henry, Earl of Richmond.

Richard III premiered in Brazil on 20 August 1995, and was released in the United States on 29 December 1995, and in the United Kingdom on 26 April of the following year. While unsuccessful at the box office, it received critical acclaim, and won several accolades. At the 50th British Academy Film Awards, it won the awards for Best Production Design and Best Costume Design, with nominations for Best British Film, Best Adapted Screenplay, and Best Actor in a Leading Role for McKellen. It also earned Oscar nominations for Best Art Direction and Best Costume Design, and McKellen was nominated for a Golden Globe Award for Best Actor – Motion Picture Drama.

== Plot ==
In a fictitious timeline of England in the late 1930s, a civil war (which occurs roughly 450 years later than the historical event) ends with the Lancastrian King Henry and his son Prince Edward assassinated by Yorkist Field Marshal Richard, Duke of Gloucester. Richard's elder brother Edward becomes King. Richard is determined to take the crown, and pits King Edward against their other brother, George, Duke of Clarence, who is later imprisoned under a sentence of death. Richard deceives and marries Prince Edward's widow Lady Anne Neville.

Queen Elizabeth intercedes on Clarence's behalf and persuades Edward to spare his life. Richard destroys the royal pardon and commissions a soldier James Tyrrell to murder Clarence, ostensibly in compliance with the original death sentence. Richard informs Edward of Clarence's death at a meeting with Prime Minister William Hastings, and the shocked King dies from a stroke. As Edward's sons are underage, Richard becomes Regent, taking the title of Lord Protector with the support of the ambitious and corrupt Henry Buckingham.

To undermine his rivals for the throne, Richard has Rivers, the Queen's brother, assassinated and uses the sordid circumstances of his death to damage the Queen's reputation and cast doubt on her sons' legitimacy. Hastings' reluctance to support Richard's claim to the crown enrages Richard so much that he manufactures false charges of treason against the Prime Minister, who is sentenced to death by hanging. Having made an example of his only vocal opponent, Richard persuades the Lord Mayor of London and members of the House of Lords to acknowledge his claim to the throne and crown him King. Acting on the advice of Archbishop Thomas and Lord Stanley, the Lancastrian heir, Henry, Earl of Richmond, flees to France.

Following his coronation Richard, now King Richard III, seeks to make his throne secure. He employs Tyrrell to murder the princes after failing to convince Buckingham to do so. Aware that Richmond intends to marry Elizabeth, he instructs Sir William Catesby to spread rumours that Lady Anne is ill and likely to die; with Richard intending to marry Elizabeth himself. Lady Anne is found dead sometime later from an apparent drug overdose. Impatient for the promised reward for his loyalty, Buckingham demands the Earldom of Hereford. Richard dismisses this in a high-handed manner, with the line "I am not in the giving vein". Buckingham, also disturbed by the murders of the princes and Hastings, flees to meet Richmond but is later captured and killed by Tyrrell on Richard's orders.

Richmond gathers supporters, among them Archbishop Thomas and Air Marshal Thomas Stanley. As such Richard's mother, the Duchess of York, turns against her son after confronting and then disowning him in a heated argument between them. Richmond marries Elizabeth and unites both Houses and political factions against Richard. With the army's loyalty slipping and the legitimacy of his claims to the crown weakened, Richard prepares for the final battle against the Lancastrians, who plan an invasion by launching an attack on London. Richard's remaining loyal troops, assembling in a marshalling yard, are attacked from the air, revealing Stanley's defection to the Lancastrian cause.

The two armies meet soon after at a ruined Battersea Power Station. Richard and Richmond seek each other out but when his vehicle stalls Richard flees into the structure. Pursued by Richmond himself, Richard is forced to climb onto exposed metal beams high above the burning battlefield. Cornered by Richmond and refusing to surrender, Richard falls into the inferno with a maniacal grin, reflected by Richmond.

== Cast ==
- Ian McKellen as Richard, Duke of Gloucester, later King Richard III
- Annette Bening as Queen Elizabeth
- Jim Broadbent as the Duke of Buckingham
- Robert Downey Jr. as Rivers
- Kristin Scott Thomas as Lady Anne Neville
- Maggie Smith as the Duchess of York
- John Wood as King Edward IV
- Nigel Hawthorne as George, Duke of Clarence
- Adrian Dunbar as Sir James Tyrrell
- Edward Hardwicke as Lord Stanley
- Tim McInnerny as Sir William Catesby
- Jim Carter as Lord Hastings
- Dominic West as Henry, Earl of Richmond (the future King Henry VII)
- Tres Hanley as Lord Rivers' mistress
- Roger Hammond as Archbishop Thomas
- Donald Sumpter as Robert Brackenbury
- Bill Paterson as Richard Ratcliffe
- Kate Steavenson-Payne as Princess Elizabeth
- Christopher Bowen as Edward of Lancaster, Prince of Wales
- Matthew Groom as Prince Richard of York
- Marco Williamson as Edward of York, Prince of Wales
- Edward Jewesbury as King Henry VI
- Denis Lill as Lord Mayor of London
- Ryan Gilmore as George Stanley
- Stacey Kent as Singer at the celebratory ball

Michael Elphick has an uncredited cameo appearance as the second murderer of George the Duke of Clarence.

== Adaptation ==
The film is based upon a National Theatre production of Richard III, starring McKellen and directed by Richard Eyre, which ran in the summer of 1990.

The evoking of 20th-century Fascist and authoritarian imagery in a Shakespeare production had existed since at least the 1930s, notably Orson Welles' 1937 staging of Julius Caesar. In setting the film during that period, McKellen chose to portray the Woodvilles as Americans, alluding to Edward VIII's marriage to Wallis Simpson. Richard's deformities (themselves largely ahistorical) is portrayed as a withered arm, evoking German Kaiser Wilhelm II's Erb's palsy.

In adapting the original text, McKellen and Loncraine cut the character of Queen Margaret, giving some of her dialogue to the Duchess of York, and several minor parts including Clarence's children. Conversely, the roles of Richmond and James Tyrrell (combined with the 1st Murderer) are expanded. Rivers is also killed earlier in the film than he is in the play.

== Production ==
=== Development ===
McKellen originally wanted Eyre to direct the film version as well, but declined due to his theatrical commitments. He stated in a 2024 interview,

Although it is a history play, if you look at the dates, there were people at the original production whose grandparents would have lived in Richard III's time. Richard [Eyre] suggested looking back to the 1930s and fascism, which seemed like a modern equivalent. Just before the play opened in the US, I said: "Shouldn't we film this?" He said: "Yes, you'd better write a screenplay."

Richard Loncraine admitted he was not well-versed in Shakespeare, but McKellen trusted him due to his instinct for strong visuals. "He knew nothing about Shakespeare but the partnership was perfect. He gave way on any point I made about the text and I conceded on visual things because he knew how to tell the story cinematically", McKellen said.

=== Casting ===
McKellen cast Robert Downey Jr., having enjoyed working with him in Restoration earlier that same year. Loncraine recalled of Downey "Robert Downey Jr was in a pretty bad way in those days: well-mannered, just not always quite with us, though his performance didn’t suffer."

Dominic West made his film debut as Richmond.

=== Filming ===
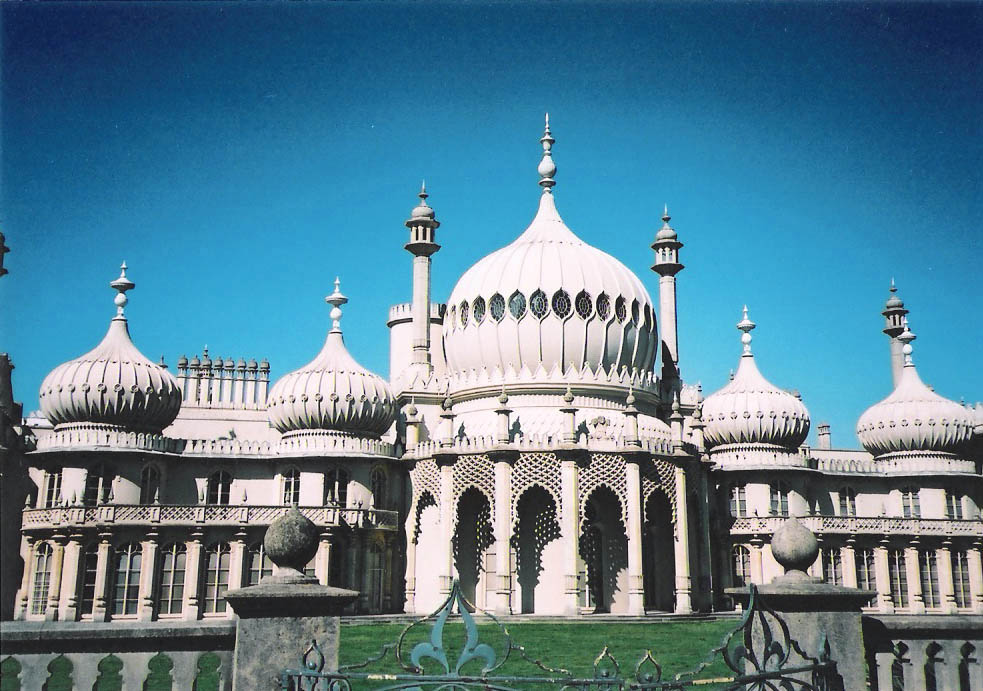
The Royal Pavilion, Brighton

In keeping with the film's aesthetics, Loncraine chose locations that evoked a modernist architectural style rather than accuracy to the original text, for example portraying the Tower of London with the exterior of Bankside Power Station. Filming took place at Shepperton Studios and at various locations including the Royal Pavilion in Brighton, St Cuthbert's, Earls Court; Carnforth MPD, Senate House, London; Strawberry Hill House, County Hall, and St Pancras London Hotel. The climactic battle scene was shot at Battersea Power Station.

== Reception ==
Richard III received acclaim from critics. On Rotten Tomatoes the film has an approval rating of 96% based on 53 reviews, with an average score of 8.2/10. The website's consensus reads: "This re-imagining of Shakespeare's Crookback King relocates the story in 1930 and features an indelible star turn for Ian McKellen as the monstrous and magnetic King Richard." On Metacritic the film has an average score of 86 based on 24 reviews, indicating "universal acclaim".

Empire magazine gave the film four out of five, calling it "fascinating" and "cerebral". Jeffrey Lyons said the film was "mesmerizing", while Richard Corliss in Time called it "cinematic". Mick LaSalle of the San Francisco Chronicle wrote, "the picture never stops coming at you". Roger Ebert of the Chicago Sun-Times gave the film four out of four of stars and added it to his Great Movies list, writing, "this is a film with a dread fascination... perversely entertaining."

=== Accolades ===
Award	Category	Nominee(s)	Result	Ref.
Academy Awards	Best Art Direction	Tony Burrough	Nominated	
Academy Awards	Best Costume Design	Shuna Harwood	Nominated	
Berlin International Film Festival	Golden Bear	Richard Loncraine	Nominated	
Berlin International Film Festival	Best Director	Richard Loncraine	Won (Note: Tied with Yim Ho for The Sun Has Ears.)	
British Academy Film Awards	Outstanding British Film	Lisa Katselas Paré, Stephen Bayly, and Richard Loncraine	Nominated	
British Academy Film Awards	Best Actor in a Leading Role	Ian McKellen	Nominated	
British Academy Film Awards	Best Adapted Screenplay	Ian McKellen and Richard Loncraine	Nominated	
British Academy Film Awards	Best Costume Design	Shuna Harwood	Won	
British Academy Film Awards	Best Production Design	Tony Burrough	Won	
British Society of Cinematographers Awards	Best Cinematography in a Theatrical Feature Film	Peter Biziou	Nominated	
Camerimage	Golden Frog	Peter Biziou	Nominated	
Chlotrudis Awards	Best Actor	Ian McKellen	Nominated	
European Film Awards	European Actor of the Year	Ian McKellen	Won	
Evening Standard British Film Awards	Best Film	Ian McKellen	Won	
Evening Standard British Film Awards	Best Technical or Artistic Achievement	Tony Burrough	Won	
Golden Globe Awards	Best Actor in a Motion Picture – Drama	Ian McKellen	Nominated	
London Film Critics Circle Awards	British Actor of the Year	Ian McKellen	Won (Note: Tied with Ewan McGregor for Brassed Off, Emma, The Pillow Book, and Trainspotting.)	
Nastro d'Argento	Best Foreign Director	Richard Loncraine	Nominated	

== Soundtrack ==
The soundtrack to Richard III was released on 27 February 1996.

No.	Title	Artist	Length
1.	"The Invasion"	Trevor Jones	1:37
2.	"Come Live With Me"	Stacey Kent	5:40
3.	"Now Is the Winter of Our Discontent"	Trevor Jones	1:01
4.	"Mortuarty"	Trevor Jones	1:26
5.	"Bid Me Farewell/I'll Have Her"	Trevor Jones	1:21
6.	"Clarence's Dream"	Trevor Jones	3:04
7.	"Crimson"	Trevor Jones	3:13
8.	"Clarence's Murder"	Trevor Jones	2:05
9.	"The Tower"	Trevor Jones	2:06
10.	"The Blessing"	Trevor Jones	0:27
11.	"Conspiracy"	Trevor Jones	0:35
12.	"Toe Tappers"	Trevor Jones	2:14
13.	"Let Sorrow Haunt Your Bed"	Trevor Jones	1:29
14.	"The Reach of Hell/Long Live the King"	Trevor Jones	1:15
15.	"Good Angels Guard You"	Trevor Jones	0:28
16.	"Coronation Haze"	Trevor Jones	1:11
17.	"Prelude from Te Deum"	Trevor Jones	1:41
18.	"The Golden Dew of Sleep"	Trevor Jones	0:30
19.	"My Regret"	Trevor Jones	2:46
20.	"Pity Dwells Not This Eye"	Trevor Jones	0:25
21.	"Westminster"	Trevor Jones	3:14
22.	"My Most Grievous Curse"	Trevor Jones	0:49
23.	"The Duchess Departs"	Trevor Jones	0:52
24.	"The Devil's Temptation"	Trevor Jones	0:54
25.	"Richmond"	Trevor Jones	0:52
26.	"Defend Me Still"	Trevor Jones	2:47
27.	"I Did But Dream"	Trevor Jones	0:45
28.	"Elizabeth and Richmond"	Trevor Jones	1:37
29.	"My Kingdom for a Horse"	Trevor Jones	0:39
30.	"Battle"	Trevor Jones	4:42
31.	"I'm Sitting on Top of the World"	Al Jolson	1:49
32.	"Come Live with Me"	Stacey Kent	5:40
Total length:			59:14

"Come Live with Me" is a 1930s-style swing song, performed by Stacey Kent at the ball celebrating Edward IV's triumph. It is an original composition by Trevor Jones with anachronistic lyrics adapted from Christopher Marlowe's "The Passionate Shepherd to His Love", a poem actually written a century after the events depicted in the play.

== Legacy ==
One of the T-34 tanks used in the film, originally in service with the Czech army, was subsequently sold, and installed by its new owner on a plot of land in Bermondsey, London, on the corner of Mandela Way and Page's Walk. Nicknamed "Stompie", it was regularly repainted by graffiti artists, but was removed in 2022.
