= Kary Antholis =

American publisher and editor

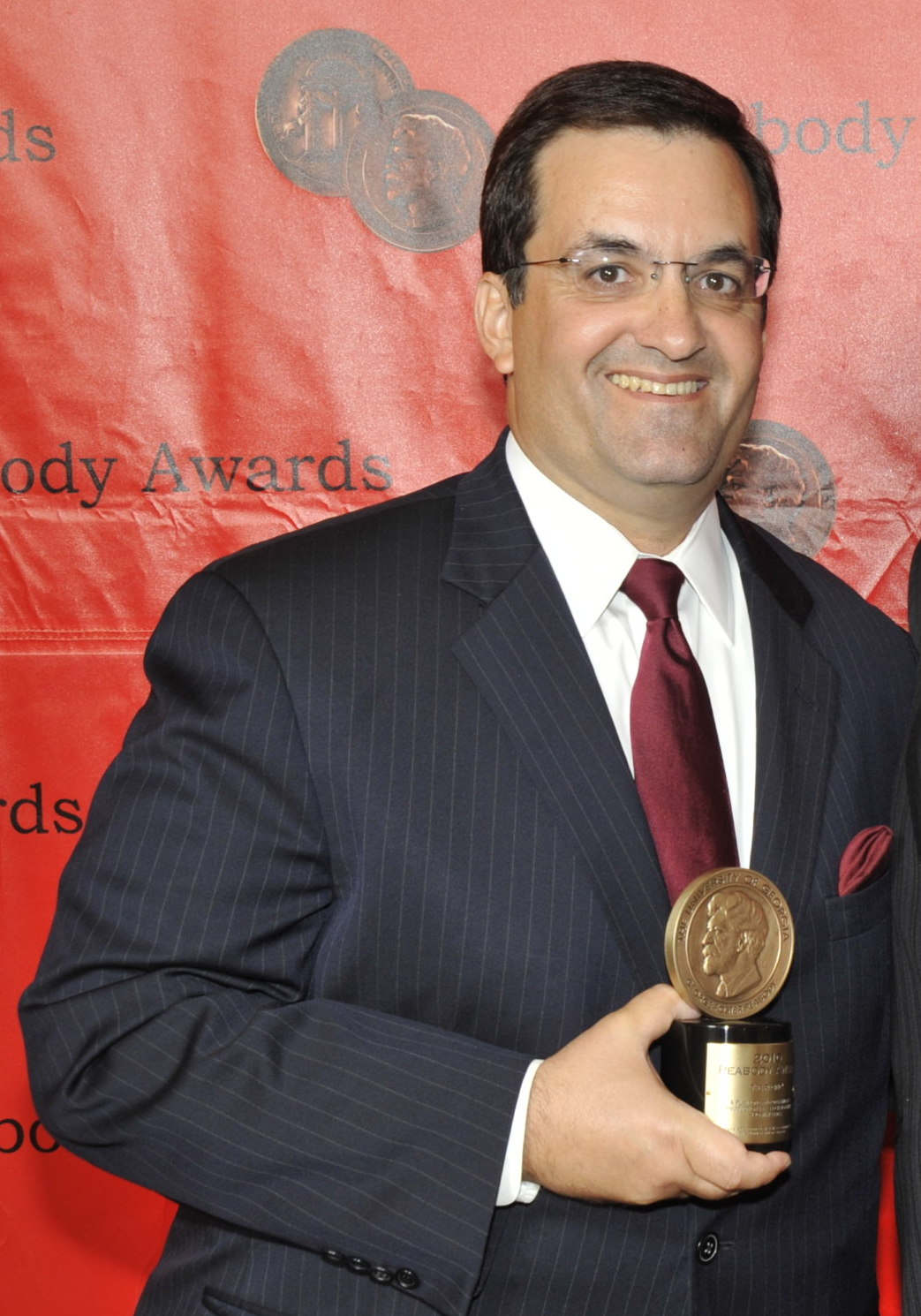
Antholis at the 70th Annual Peabody Awards

Kary Antholis (born 1962) is an American publisher and editor of CrimeStory.com, former executive at the television network HBO and documentary filmmaker best known for the Oscar-winning short One Survivor Remembers, which was inducted into the National Film Registry in 2012. Antholis serves on the Board of Visitors of the Georgetown University Law Center and formerly served as co-chair of board of directors for Young Storytellers.

== Biography ==
Antholis grew up in Florham Park, New Jersey and attended the Delbarton School in Morris Township, New Jersey. He is a 1984 graduate of Bowdoin College, earned a master's degree in History at Stanford University with a focus on the historical role European nations in Africa and graduated from the Georgetown University Law Center in 1989. He has one brother, William J. Antholis, CEO of the Miller Center.

== Career ==
Kary Antholis founded Crime Story Media, LLC in July 2019, after retiring as President of Miniseries and Cinemax Programming at HBO.

In over 25 years as a creative executive at HBO, Kary oversaw Academy Award, Emmy and Golden Globe-winning projects, including Chernobyl, Angels in America, Olive Kitteridge, John Adams, The Pacific, The Night Of, Generation Kill, The Corner, Elizabeth I, The Gathering Storm, Wit, Show Me a Hero, Mildred Pierce, Elvis Presley: The Searcher and Educating Peter. As head of Cinemax Programming since 2011, Kary led the channel’s branding strategy, commissioning breakthrough series including Strike Back, Banshee, The Knick, Warrior, Jett and Tales from the Tour Bus.

Kary began his film career as a documentarian, winning the Academy Award for Documentary Short Subject and the Emmy for Outstanding Informational Special for his film One Survivor Remembers, about Holocaust survivor, Gerda Weissmann Klein. One Survivor Remembers was the first HBO program added by the Librarian of Congress to the National Film Registry, an honor given to “culturally, historically or aesthetically” significant American films.

Kary serves on the Board of Visitors at Georgetown Law and as an adjunct professor at USC’s School of Cinematic Arts. He holds a JD from Georgetown Law, an MA in History from Stanford University, and a BA from Bowdoin College.

== One Survivor Remembers ==
As a filmmaker he won the Academy Award for Documentary Short Subject (1995) and the Emmy for Outstanding Information Special (1994–95) for his film One Survivor Remembers about Holocaust survivor, Gerda Weissmann Klein. Exploring Gerda's story offered him an extraordinarily vivid connection to his own mother's experiences during the war. Antholis' mother Evanthia grew up in Nazi-occupied Greece during World War II. Weissmann's story helped Antholis understand what his mother went through when her father, Vassilios, was killed by Nazi collaborators.

In 2005, the film was offered by the Southern Poverty Law Center as part of a Teaching Tolerance curriculum for high school teachers to teach their students about the realities of the Holocaust.

He currently serves on the Board of Visitors at Georgetown Law and formerly served as the co-chair of the board of directors for Young Storytellers, an arts education nonprofit organization based in Los Angeles.

Antholis is currently Publisher/Editor at Crime Story.
