= One Survivor Remembers =

1995 film by Kary Antholis

- Directed by: Kary Antholis
- Produced by: Kary Antholis
- Starring: Gerda Weissmann Klein
- Narrated by: Peter Thomas
- Distributed by: HBO
- Release date: 1995
- Running time: 40 minutes
- Country: United States
- Language: English

One Survivor Remembers is a 1995 documentary short film by Kary Antholis.

== Summary ==
Holocaust survivor Gerda Weissmann Klein recounts her six-year ordeal as a victim of Nazi cruelty, including the loss of her parents, brother, friends, home, possessions, and community.

== Legacy ==
A production of HBO and the United States Holocaust Memorial Museum, the film won the 1996 Oscar for Best Documentary Short Subject and the Primetime Emmy for Outstanding Informational Special. In 2005, the film was offered by the Southern Poverty Law Center’s Teaching Tolerance program for high school teachers to teach their students about the realities of the Holocaust.

In 2012, the film was selected for preservation in the United States National Film Registry by the Library of Congress as being "culturally, historically, or aesthetically significant".

== See also ==
- List of Holocaust films
- Anne Frank Remembered, the 1995 Oscar-winning documentary feature similar in content
