= Lisa Katselas =

American film producer

- Born: February 12, 1959 (age 67)
- Education: University of Michigan, New York University, University of Southern California, Pepperdine University School of Law
- Occupation: Film producer

Lisa Katselas (known as Lisa Katselas Paré 1980–1996; born February 12, 1959) is an American film producer and BAFTA Award nominee. She has been an Adjunct Professor at New York University, Tisch School of the Arts, Kanbar Film and Television School since 2005.

Katselas was born and raised in Pittsburgh, Pennsylvania, and her father is renowned architect Tasso Katselas. Katselas studied at the University of Michigan, New York University and the University of Southern California; and, in 1985, after graduating from Pepperdine University School of Law, she became a licensed attorney in New York. In 1986, she moved to London and joined the London-based law firm of Compton Carr, where she raised development and production financing for independent producers.

In 1988, Katselas joined Red Rooster Film and Television Entertainment on the production of Just Ask for Diamond; and, in 1991, she was named as Head of Business Affairs. In 1993, she assisted in the forming of Red Rooster Pictures, and later partnered with Stephen Bayly to form Bayly/Pare Productions. She is best known for her first film production, Richard III (1995), for which she was nominated for a BAFTA award and which starred Ian McKellen, Annette Bening, Jim Broadbent, Dame Maggie Smith and Robert Downey Jr. She later produced Mrs Dalloway (1997), a film adaptation of the Virginia Woolf novel Mrs Dalloway (1925), starring Vanessa Redgrave.

Katselas was the first wife of actor Michael Paré from 1980–1982.

In 1996, Katselas married Scottish singer songwriter Anday McCarron, lead singer and guitar player in the band Swimmer signed to Maverick Records. They have a daughter and reside in New York City.
