= Richard Loncraine =

British film and television director

- Born: 20 October 1946 (age 79); Cheltenham, Gloucestershire England
- Occupation: Film director
- Years active: 1974–present
- Children: Rebecca Veselka; Oliver Loncraine; Joe Loncraine; Jesse Loncraine; Grace Loncraine

Richard Loncraine (born 20 October 1946) is a British film and television director.

Loncraine was born in Cheltenham, Gloucestershire.

Loncraine received early training in the features department of the BBC, including a season directing items for Tomorrow's World. Before his career in film, he was a sculptor and the first to create a chrome Newton's cradle. In 1996, he won the Silver Bear for Best Director at the 46th Berlin International Film Festival for Richard III. In 2002, he won the Primetime Emmy Award for Outstanding Directing for a Miniseries, Movie or a Dramatic Special for Band of Brothers with other series directors.

== Filmography ==
=== Film ===
- Professor Popper's Problem (1975) (written only)
- Slade in Flame (1975)
- Full Circle (1977)
- The Missionary (1982)
- Brimstone and Treacle (1982)
- Bellman and True (1987) (also written)
- Richard III (1995) (also written)
- Wimbledon (2004)
- Firewall (2006)
- My One and Only (2009)
- 5 Flights Up (2014)
- Finding Your Feet (2017)

=== Television ===
- Secret Orchards (1979)
- Blade on the Feather (1980)
- Wide-Eyed and Legless (1993)
- "Day of Days", Band of Brothers (2001)
- The Gathering Storm (2002)
- My House in Umbria (2003)
- The Special Relationship (2010)
