= Tony Burrough =

Production designer

- Occupation: Production designer
- Years active: 1978–2007

Tony Burrough is a production designer known for his work on the 1995 film Richard III.

== Career ==
In 1989, he was nominated for the British Academy Television Award for Best Production Design for his work on Series 1 of Alan Bennett's Talking Heads. He was nominated for the same award in 1996 for his work on the 1995 miniseries The Buccaneers.

In 1996, Burrough was nominated for the Academy Award for Best Art Direction for the 1995 film Richard III. He won the 1997 BAFTA Award for Best Production Design for the same film. In 2000, he was nominated for the Primetime Emmy Award for Outstanding Art Direction for a Miniseries or Movie alongside Choi Ho Man and Dominic Smithers for their work on the television miniseries Arabian Nights.

Burrough's production design has been praised by many critics. Kenneth Turan of the Los Angeles Times referred to his settings in several films as being "so satisfying that they're a reason to see the film all by themselves". His design of Santa's workshop and elf village in The Santa Clause 2 was praised by Kevin Thomas as being "the film's strongest asset".

== Filmography ==
=== Television ===
- Doctor Who – The Keeper of Traken (1981), Four to Doomsday (1982), Black Orchid (1982), Warriors of the Deep (1984), The Two Doctors (1985)
- BBC Television Shakespeare – Titus Andronicus (1985)
- The Devil's Disciple (1987)
- Talking Heads (1988)
- The Buccaneers (1995)
- Arabian Nights (2000)

=== Film ===
- Richard III (1995)
- Great Expectations (1998)
- The Luzhin Defence (2000)
- Ordinary Decent Criminal (2000)
- A Knight's Tale (2001)
- The Santa Clause 2 (2002)
- Tuck Everlasting (2002)
- Hotel Rwanda (2004)
- Ladder 49 (2004)
- Chromophobia (2005)
- Garfield: A Tail of Two Kitties (2006)
- The Water Horse: Legend of the Deep (2007)
