= List of Alan Arkin performances =

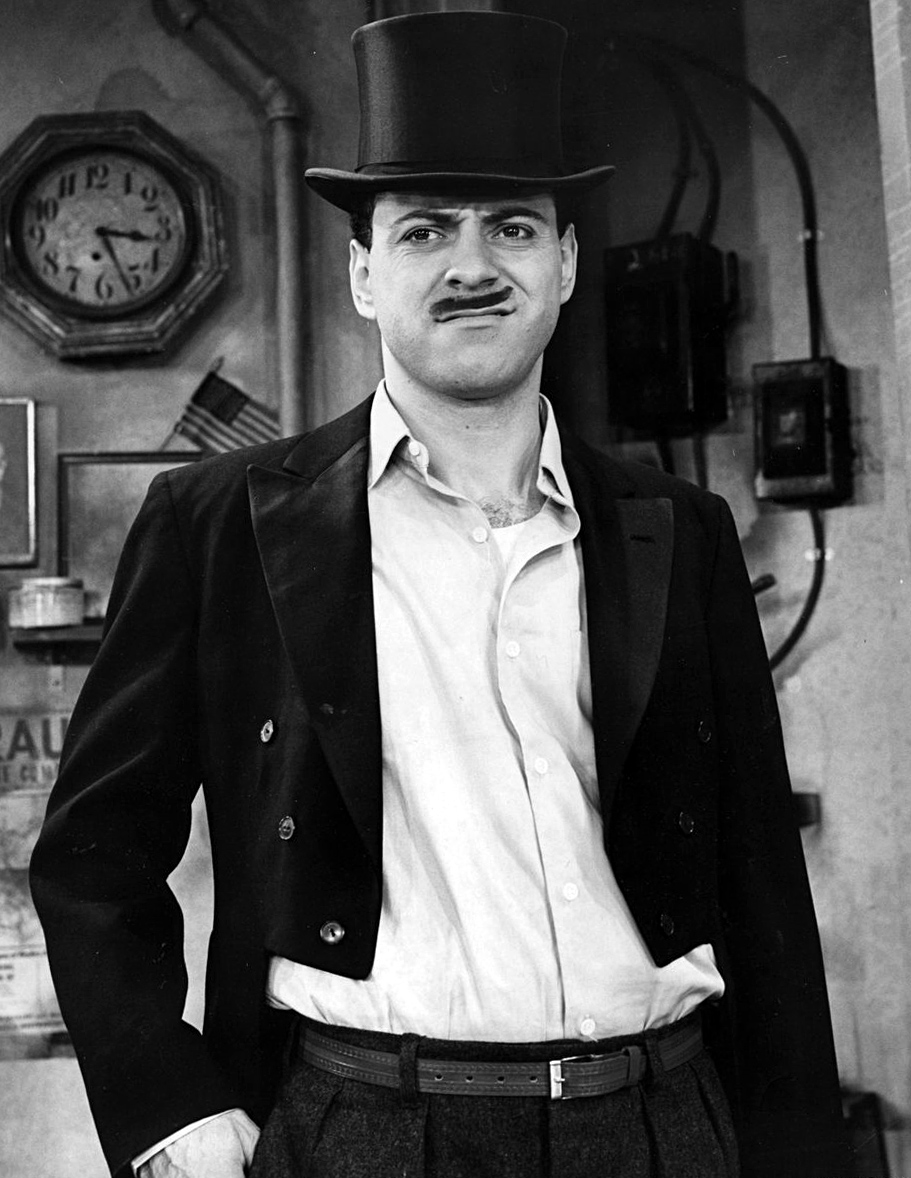
Arkin on stage in Enter Laughing (1963).

This is a complete filmography of Alan Arkin (1934–2023). Arkin made his film debut as a member of the folk group The Tarriers in Calypso Heat Wave (1957). However, it would be nearly a decade before he would return to the big screen for his breakout performance in Norman Jewison's The Russians Are Coming the Russians Are Coming (1966), which earned him an Academy Award nomination for Best Actor and won him a Golden Globe Award (Best Comedy or Musical Actor). He continuted with equally critically acclaimed performances in Wait Until Dark (1967), The Heart Is a Lonely Hunter (1968), Popi (1969), and Catch-22 (1970). For Heart, he earned his second Oscar nomination; in addition, that plus Popi earned him two more Golden Globe nominations.

Arkin had one additionally notable 1960s role, which was temporarily stepping in for Peter Sellers in portraying Inspector Jacques Clouseau in the titular Inspector Clouseau (1968). He subsequently had a busy decade in the 1970s. He directed and co-starred in the films Little Murders (1971) and Fire Sale (1977). Other films he solely acted in during this period include Last of the Red Hot Lovers (1972); Freebie and the Bean (1974); Hearts of the West (1975); The Seven-Per-Cent Solution (1976); and The In-Laws (also executive producer) and The Magician of Lublin (both 1979).

His output tapered down in the 1980s, featuring in a few films such as Simon (1980), Improper Channels (1981), Joshua Then and Now (1985), Big Trouble (1986), and a voice role in The Last Unicorn (1982). However, Arkin was more prolific in the 1990s, with such films as Edward Scissorhands (1990); Glengarry Glen Ross (1992); Indian Summer and So I Married an Axe Murderer (both 1993); North (1994); Four Days in September, Gattaca, and Grosse Pointe Blank (all 1997); Slums of Beverly Hills (1998); and Jakob the Liar (1999).

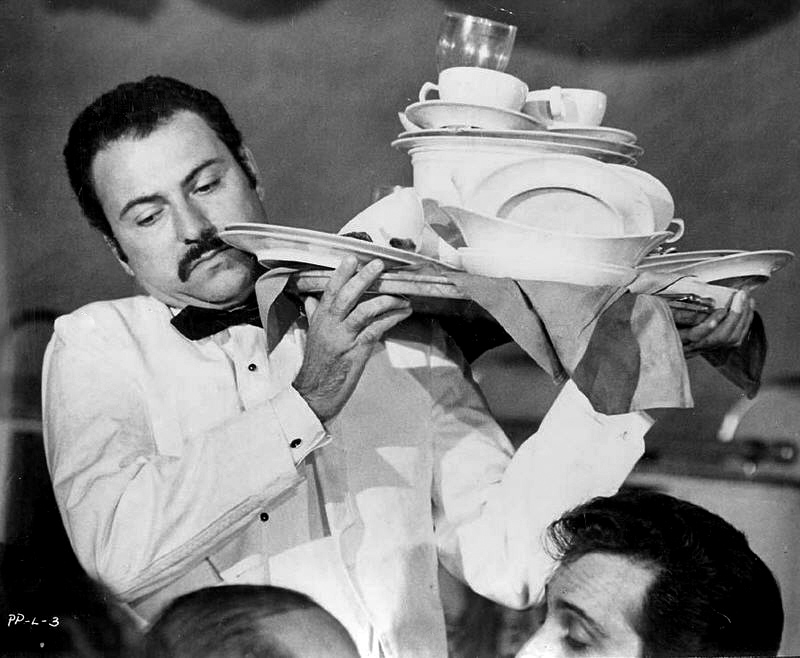
Arkin in the film Popi (1969).

When the new millennium arrived, Arkin began receiving awards notice once more for his performances. One such film is Thirteen Conversations About One Thing (2001), which garnered him a few critics' awards. But it was his performance in the indie comedy hit film Little Miss Sunshine (2006) for which he received the Academy Award for Best Supporting Actor and the corresponding BAFTA. He would later earn his fourth and final Oscar nomination for Ben Affleck's Argo (2012). These latter two films also won him one SAG Award for Best Motion Picture Cast each.

Some other films Arkin acted in during this time period included Rendition (2007); Get Smart, Marley & Me, and Sunshine Cleaning (all 2008); City Island and The Private Lives of Pippa Lee (both 2009); The Muppets (2011), in a cameo; Stand Up Guys (2012); The Incredible Burt Wonderstone (2013); Million Dollar Arm (2014); Going in Style (2017); Dumbo (2019); and another voice role in Minions: The Rise of Gru (2022), which was his penultimate film and the last released during his lifetime.

On stage, he was known for his Tony Award-winning performance in Enter Laughing. He earned another nomination directing Neil Simon's The Sunshine Boys. Arkin also had several notable television roles, which included The Defection of Simas Kudirka and The Other Side of Hell (both 1978); Escape from Sobibor (1987); Cooperstown (1993); And Starring Pancho Villa as Himself and The Pentagon Papers (both 2003); and The Kominsky Method (2018–2019). He garnered Emmy nominations for Sobibor, Pentagon, and twice for Kominsky, in addition to two other guest roles on Chicago Hope and ABC Stage 67—albeit, he never won. His final performance was in a crime caper heist film, The Smack, which has yet to be released.

== Filmography ==
=== Film ===
Alan Arkin film credits
Year	Title	Role	Notes	Ref.
1957	Calypso Heat Wave	Tarriers lead singer		
1963	That's Me	Unknown	Short film; also writer	
1966	The Russians Are Coming the Russians Are Coming	Lt. Rozanov		
1966	The Last Mohican	Mr. Ableman	Short film; also writer	
1967	Woman Times Seven	Fred	Segment: The Suicides	
1967	Wait Until Dark	Roat / Harry Roat Jr. / Harry Roat Sr.		
1968	Inspector Clouseau	Inspector Jacques Clouseau		
1968	The Heart Is a Lonely Hunter	John Singer		
1969	Popi	Abraham Rodriguez		
1969	The Monitors	Garbage man in commercial	Cameo	
1969	People Soup	Adam	Short film; also writer and director	
1970	Catch-22	Capt. John Yossarian		
1971	Little Murders	Lt. Miles Practice	Also director	
1972	Deadhead Miles	Cooper		
1972	Last of the Red Hot Lovers	Barney Cashman		
1974	Freebie and the Bean	Det. Sgt. Dan "Bean" Delgado		
1975	Rafferty and the Gold Dust Twins	Gunny Rafferty	Aka Rafferty and the Highway Hustlers	
1975	Hearts of the West	Burt Kessler		
1976	The Seven-Per-Cent Solution	Sigmund Freud		
1977	Fire Sale	Ezra Fikus	Also director	
1979	The In-Laws	Sheldon S. Kornpett, D.D.S.	Also executive producer	
1979	The Magician of Lublin	Yasha Mazur		
1980	Simon	Prof. Simon Mendelssohn		
1981	Improper Channels	Jeffrey Martley		
1981	Chu Chu and the Philly Flash	Flash		
1981	Full Moon High	Dr. Brand		
1982	The Last Unicorn	Schmendrick	Voice	
1983	The Return of Captain Invincible	Captain Invincible		
1985	Joshua Then and Now	Reuben Shapiro		
1985	Bad Medicine	Dr. Ramón Madera		
1986	Big Trouble	Leonard Hoffman		
1990	Coupe de Ville	Fred Libner		
1990	Edward Scissorhands	Bill Boggs		
1990	Havana	Joe Volpi		
1991	The Rocketeer	A. "Peevy" Peabody		
1992	Glengarry Glen Ross	George Aaronow		
1993	Indian Summer	Unca Lou Handler		
1993	So I Married an Axe Murderer	Police Captain		
1993	Samuel Beckett Is Coming Soon	The Director	Also director	
1994	North	Judge Buckle		
1995	Picture Windows	Tully	Segment: Soir Bleu	
1995	The Jerky Boys: The Movie	Ernie Lazarro		
1995	Steal Big Steal Little	Lou Perilli		
1996	Heck's Way Home	Dogcatcher		
1996	Mother Night	George Kraft		
1997	Grosse Pointe Blank	Dr. Oatman		
1997	Four Days in September	Charles Burke Elbrick		
1997	Gattaca	Det. Hugo		
1998	Slums of Beverly Hills	Murray Samuel Abromowitz		
1999	Jakob the Liar	Max Frankfurter		
2000	Magicians	Milo	Direct-to-video	
2001	America's Sweethearts	Wellness Guide		
2001	Thirteen Conversations About One Thing	Gene		
2004	Eros	Dr. Pearl / Hal	Segment: Equilibrium	
2004	Noel	Artie Venizelos		
2006	Little Miss Sunshine	Edwin Hoover	Credited as Grandpa	
2006	Firewall	Arlin Forester		
2006	The Novice	Father Benkhe		
2006	The Santa Clause 3: The Escape Clause	Bud Newman		
2006	Raising Flagg	Flagg Purdy		
2007	Rendition	Senator Hawkins		
2008	Sunshine Cleaning	Joe Lorkowski		
2008	Get Smart	The Chief		
2008	Marley & Me	Arnie Klein		
2009	The Private Lives of Pippa Lee	Herb Lee		
2009	City Island	Michael Malakov		
2011	Thin Ice	Gorvy Hauer		
2011	The Change-Up	Mitchell Planko Sr.		
2011	The Muppets	Tour Guide	Cameo	
2012	Argo	Lester Siegel		
2012	Stand Up Guys	Richard Hirsch		
2013	The Incredible Burt Wonderstone	Rance Holloway		
2013	In Security	Officer Riggs		
2013	Grudge Match	Louis "Lightning" Conlon		
2014	Million Dollar Arm	Ray Poitevint		
2015	Love the Coopers	Bucky		
2017	Going in Style	Albert Garner		
2019	Dumbo	J. Griffin Remington		
2020	Spenser Confidential	Henry Cimoli		
2022	Minions: The Rise of Gru	Wild Knuckles	Voice	

=== Television ===
Alan Arkin television credits
Year	Title	Role	Notes	Ref.
1964	East Side/West Side	Ted Miller	Episode: "The Beatnik and the Politician"	
1966	ABC Stage 67	Barney Kempinski	Episode: "The Love Song of Barney Kempinski"	
1970–1971	Sesame Street	Larry	4 episodes, with then-wife Barbara Dana as Larry's wife Phyllis	
1978	The Other Side of Hell	Frank Dole	Television film	
1978	The Defection of Simas Kudirka	Simas Kudirka	Television film	
1979	Carol Burnett & Company	Himself	Episode #1.2	
1980	The Muppet Show	Himself	Episode: "Alan Arkin"	
1983	St. Elsewhere	Jerry Singleton	3 episodes	
1984	American Playhouse	Flagg Purdy	Episode: "A Matter of Principle"	
1985	Faerie Tale Theatre	Bo	Episode: "The Emperor's New Clothes"	
1985	The Fourth Wise Man	Orontes	Television film	
1986	A Deadly Business	Harold Kaufman	Television film	
1987	Harry	Harry Porschak	7 episodes	
1987	Escape from Sobibor	Leon Feldhendler	Television film	
1988	Necessary Parties	Archie Corelli	Television film	
1993	Cooperstown	Harry Willette	Television film	
1993	Taking the Heat	Tommy Canard	Television film	
1994	Doomsday Gun	Col. Yossi	Television film	
1995	Picture Windows	Tully	Miniseries	
1997	Chicago Hope	Zoltan Karpathein	Episode: "The Son Also Rises"	
1999	Blood Money	Willy "The Hammer" Canzaro	Television film	
2001	Varian's War	Bill Freier	Television film	
2001–2002	100 Centre Street	Joe Rifkind	10 episodes	
2003	The Pentagon Papers	Harry Rowen	Television film	
2003	And Starring Pancho Villa as Himself	Sam Drebben	Television film	
2005	Will & Grace	Marty Adler	Episode: "It's a Dad, Dad, Dad, Dad World"	
2015–2016	BoJack Horseman	J. D. Salinger	Voice, 4 episodes	
2017	Get Shorty	Eugene	Episode: "The Yips"	
2018–2019	The Kominsky Method	Norman Newlander	16 episodes	

=== Theater ===
Alan Arkin theater credits
Year	Title	Role	Venue	Ref.
1961	From the Second City	Performer	Royale Theatre, Broadway	
1963	Enter Laughing	Performer – David Kolowitz	Henry Miller's Theatre, Broadway	
1964	Luv	Performer – Harry Berlin	Booth Theatre, Broadway	
1966	Hail Scrawdyke!	Director	Booth Theatre, Broadway	
1972	The Sunshine Boys	Director	Broadhurst Theatre, Broadway	
1973	Molly	Director	Alvin Theatre, Broadway	
1998	Power Plays	Director/Co-Writer/Performer	Seattle (from March 12); Manhattan Theater Club, New York (May 1998–March 1999)	
2000	Taller Than a Dwarf	Director	Longacre Theatre, Broadway	

== See also ==
- List of awards and nominations received by Alan Arkin
