= List of awards and nominations received by Alan Arkin =

List of Alan Arkin awards
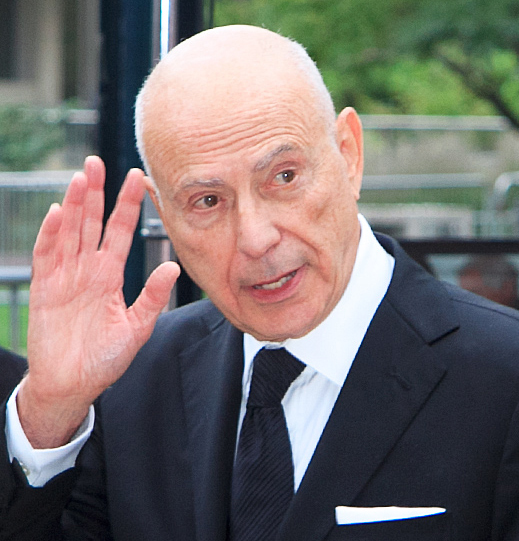
- Arkin at the 2012 Toronto International Film Festival
Award	Wins	Nominations
Academy Awards	1	4
BAFTA Awards	1	3
Emmy Award	0	6
Golden Globe Award	1	8
SAG Award	2	8
Tony Awards	1	2
Overall	6	31

Alan Arkin (1934–2023) was an American actor, director, and comedian of the stage and screen. He received various awards including an Academy Award, a BAFTA Award, a Golden Globe Award, two SAG Awards, and a Tony Award.

He received the Academy Award for Best Supporting Actor and BAFTA Award for Best Supporting Actor for his comedic role as the elderly irascible grandfather in the independent comedy Little Miss Sunshine (2006). He received Academy Award nominations for The Russians Are Coming, the Russians Are Coming (1966), The Heart is a Lonely Hunter (1968), and Argo (2012). He received the Golden Globe Award for Best Actor – Motion Picture Musical or Comedy for his role in the Norman Jewison comedy The Russians Are Coming, the Russians Are Coming (1966). He received two Screen Actors Guild Award for Outstanding Performance by a Cast in a Motion Picture along with the ensembles of Little Miss Sunshine (2006), and Argo (2012).

For his work on television, he received six Primetime Emmy Award nominations, including two nominations for Outstanding Supporting Actor in a Comedy Series for The Kominsky Method (2018–present). He also received four Screen Actors Guild Award nominations, and two Golden Globe Award nominations for his role in the series. For his work on the Broadway stage he received the Tony Award for Best Featured Actor in a Play for Enter Laughing in 1963 and was nominated for the Tony Award for Best Direction of a Play for The Sunshine Boys in 1973.

== Main associations ==
=== Academy Awards ===
Year	Category	Nominated work	Result	Ref.
1967	Best Actor	The Russians Are Coming, the Russians Are Coming	Nominated	
1969	Best Actor	The Heart Is a Lonely Hunter	Nominated	
2007	Best Supporting Actor	Little Miss Sunshine	Won	
2013	Best Supporting Actor	Argo	Nominated	

=== BAFTA Awards ===
Year	Category	Nominated work	Result	Ref.
1967	Most Promising Newcomer	The Russians Are Coming, the Russians Are Coming	Nominated	
2007	Best Actor in a Supporting Role	Little Miss Sunshine	Won	
2013	Best Actor in a Supporting Role	Argo	Nominated	

=== Emmy Awards ===
Year	Category	Nominated work	Result	Ref.
Primetime Emmy Awards
1967	Outstanding Single Performance by an Actor in a Leading Role in a Drama	ABC Stage 67	Nominated	
1987	Outstanding Lead Actor in a Miniseries or a Special	Escape from Sobibor	Nominated	
1997	Outstanding Guest Actor in a Drama Series	Chicago Hope	Nominated	
2003	Outstanding Supporting Actor in a Limited Series or Movie	The Pentagon Papers	Nominated	
2019	Outstanding Supporting Actor in a Comedy Series	The Kominsky Method	Nominated	
2020	Outstanding Supporting Actor in a Comedy Series	The Kominsky Method	Nominated	

=== Golden Globe Awards ===
Year	Category	Nominated work	Result	Ref.
1967	New Star of the Year		Nominated	
1967	Best Actor - Motion Picture Musical or Comedy	The Russians Are Coming, the Russians Are Coming	Won	
1969	Best Actor - Motion Picture Drama	The Heart Is a Lonely Hunter	Nominated	
1970	Best Actor - Motion Picture Drama	Popi	Nominated	
1988	Best Actor – Miniseries or TV Movie	Escape from Sobibor	Nominated	
2013	Best Supporting Actor - Motion Picture	Argo	Nominated	
2020	Best Supporting Actor - Television	The Kominsky Method	Nominated	
2021	Best Supporting Actor - Television	The Kominsky Method	Nominated	

=== Screen Actors Guild Awards ===
Year	Category	Nominated work	Result	Ref.
2007	Outstanding Cast in a Motion Picture	Little Miss Sunshine	Won	
2007	Outstanding Supporting Actor	Little Miss Sunshine	Nominated	
2013	Outstanding Cast in a Motion Picture	Argo	Won	
2013	Outstanding Supporting Actor	Argo	Nominated	
2020	Outstanding Ensemble in a Comedy Series	The Kominsky Method	Nominated	
2020	Outstanding Actor in a Comedy Series	The Kominsky Method	Nominated	
2021	Outstanding Ensemble in a Comedy Series	The Kominsky Method	Nominated	
2021	Outstanding Actor in a Comedy Series	The Kominsky Method	Nominated	

=== Tony Awards ===
Year	Category	Nominated work	Result	Ref.
1963	Best Featured Actor in a Play	Enter Laughing	Won	
1973	Best Direction of a Play	The Sunshine Boys	Nominated	

== Critics awards ==
Year	Category	Nominated work	Result	Ref.
1966	New York Film Critics Circle Award for Best Actor	The Russians Are Coming, the Russians Are Coming	Nominated	
1968	New York Film Critics Circle Award for Best Actor	The Heart Is a Lonely Hunter	Won	
1968	Kansas City Film Critics Circle Award for Best Actor	The Heart Is a Lonely Hunter	Won	
1969	Kansas City Film Critics Circle Award for Best Actor	Popi	Nominated	
1970	National Society of Film Critics Award for Best Actor	Catch-22	Nominated	
1975	New York Film Critics Circle Award for Best Supporting Actor	Hearts of the West	Won	
2001	Boston Society of Film Critics Award for Best Supporting Actor	Thirteen Conversations About One Thing	Won	
2001	Florida Film Critics Circle Award for Best Cast	Thirteen Conversations About One Thing	Won	
2001	Independent Spirit Award for Best Supporting Male	Thirteen Conversations About One Thing	Nominated	
2001	National Society of Film Critics Award for Best Supporting Actor	Thirteen Conversations About One Thing	Nominated	
2001	Online Film Critics Society Award for Best Supporting Actor	Thirteen Conversations About One Thing	Nominated	
2001	San Diego Film Critics Society Award for Best Supporting Actor	Thirteen Conversations About One Thing	Nominated	
2006	Independent Spirit Award for Best Supporting Male	Little Miss Sunshine	Won	
2006	Phoenix Film Critics Society Award for Best Cast	Little Miss Sunshine	Won	
2006	Vancouver Film Critics Circle Award for Best Supporting Actor	Little Miss Sunshine	Won	
2006	Broadcast Film Critics Association Award for Best Supporting Actor	Little Miss Sunshine	Nominated	
2006	National Society of Film Critics Award for Best Supporting Actor	Little Miss Sunshine	Nominated	
2006	Online Film Critics Society Award for Best Supporting Actor	Little Miss Sunshine	Nominated	
2012	Broadcast Film Critics Association Award for Best Supporting Actor	Argo	Nominated	
2012	Dallas-Fort Worth Film Critics Association Award for Best Supporting Actor	Argo	Nominated	
2012	London Film Critics' Circle Award for Best Supporting Actor	Argo	Nominated	
2012	Online Film Critics Society Award for Best Supporting Actor	Argo	Nominated	
2012	Phoenix Film Critics Society Award for Best Cast	Argo	Nominated	
2012	San Diego Film Critics Society Award for Best Supporting Actor	Argo	Nominated	
2012	San Diego Film Critics Society Award for Best Performance by an Ensemble	Argo	Nominated	
2012	Washington D.C. Area Film Critics Association Award for Best Supporting Actor	Argo	Nominated	

== Miscellaneous awards ==
Year	Category	Nominated work	Result	Ref.
1966	Laurel Award for Top Male Comedy Performance	The Russians Are Coming, the Russians Are Coming	Nominated	
1968	Laurel Award for Top Male Dramatic Performance	The Heart Is a Lonely Hunter	Nominated	
1970	Laurel Award for Top Male Dramatic Performance	Catch-22	Nominated	
1980	Saturn Award for Best Actor	Simon	Nominated	
1981	Genie Award for Best Performance by a Foreign Actor	Improper Channels	Won	
1985	Genie Award for Best Performance by an Actor in a Supporting Role	Joshua Then and Now	Won	
1990	Saturn Award for Best Supporting Actor	Edward Scissorhands	Nominated	
1992	Valladolid International Film Festival Best Actor Award	Glengarry Glen Ross	Won	
1993	Cable ACE Award for Best Actor in a Movie or Miniseries	Cooperstown	Nominated	
2006	Gotham Independent Film Award for Best Ensemble Cast	Little Miss Sunshine	Nominated	
2006	Prism Award for Best Performance in a Feature Film	Little Miss Sunshine	Nominated	
2006	Satellite Award for Best Supporting Actor – Motion Picture	Little Miss Sunshine	Nominated	
2012	Hollywood Film Award for Ensemble of the Year	Argo	Won	
2012	Palm Springs International Film Festival Ensemble Cast Award	Argo	Won	
2014	Gregory Peck Award — San Diego International Film Festival	—N/a	Honored	

== See also ==
- List of Alan Arkin performances
