= Bella Bruck =

American character actress (1911–1982)

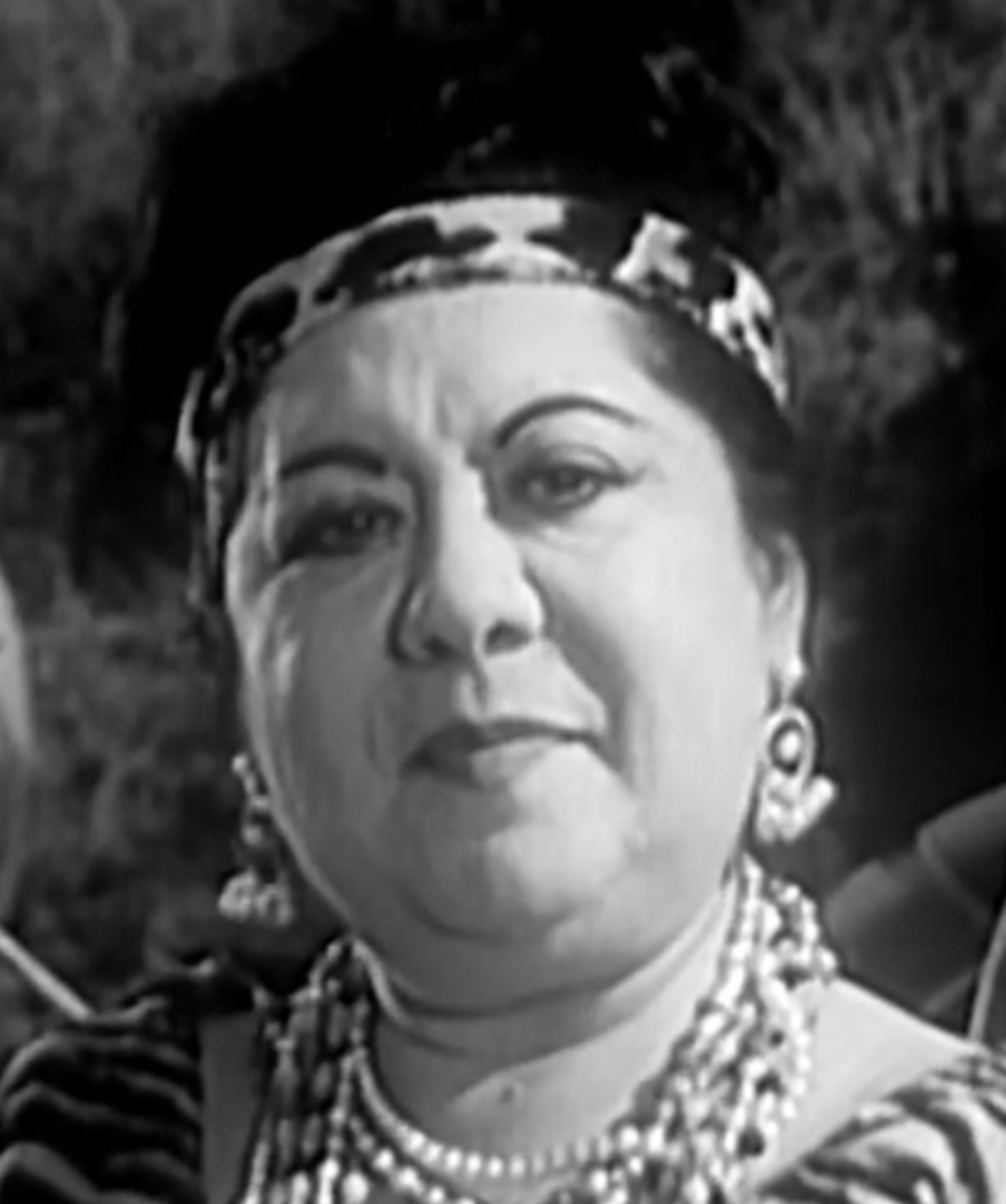
- Bruck in an episode of Lock-Up (1960)
- Born: December 11, 1911; The Bronx, New York, U.S.
- Died: April 5, 1982 (aged 70); Los Angeles, California, U.S.
- Occupation: Actress
- Years active: 1958–1980

Bella Bruck (December 11, 1911 – April 5, 1982) was an American character actress known for her expressive face, comic timing, and recurring portrayals of eccentric, loud, or ethnic maternal figures, she was a reliable supporting performer in both mainstream and cult productions.

== Early life ==
Bella Bruck was born December 11, 1911, in The Bronx, New York. She studied drama under movement specialist Benjamin Zemach, whose physically expressive style would influence Bruck’s acting throughout her career. One of her classmates in these classes was Alan Arkin, though the two would not appear on screen together until much later in life.

== Career ==
The career of Bruck in television began in the early 1960s, quickly establishing her as a scene-stealing comic character actress. Her breakout performance came in the sitcom Angel (1961), where she portrayed Mrs. Spiegelman, a French-accented friend who impersonates the main character’s mother. The episode, titled “Little White Lie,” received praise from critics who said Bruck “stole the show.”

In 1964, Bruck guest-starred in two comedic segments on The Red Skelton Hour. She played Laughing Bankbook’s mother in a sketch and also portrayed Skelton’s wife in the Silent Spot, showcasing her physical comedy skills.

She appeared in a 1965 episode of Tammy titled “The Aristocratic Tates,” where she played Grundy Tate’s swamp-dwelling sister. Though she had only three words of dialogue, her performance was well received.. Also in 1965, she was Maria The Duenna in The Addams Family (episode Morticia's Dilemma)

In 1978, Bruck guest-starred in a rerun episode of Maude involving a visit from Aunt Tinkie.

Her final known television appearance was in the 1980 ABC pilot The Ugilly Family, where she played Tillie, the mother-in-law of a working-class family that moves to California.

Bruck also performed in several stage productions throughout her career. She was cast in the 1962 West Coast premiere of the Broadway musical comedy A Family Affair at the Cameo Playhouse in Hollywood.

In 1970, she starred in the original play Bandicoot at the Actor’s Theatre Company in Los Angeles. Her performance as a Jewish matron was praised for its comedic presence and authority.

== Personal life ==
On November 30, 1961, Bruck issued a statement to clarify that she was alive following the publication of a mistaken death notice in the Los Angeles Times. She humorously added that she remained “in circulation” and available for acting roles.

== Death ==
Bella Bruck died on April 5, 1982, in Los Angeles, California, at the age of 70.

== Selected filmography ==
=== Film ===
Film
Year	Title	Role	Notes
1965	The Loved One	Mrs. Bernstein	
1966	The Glass Bottom Boat	Minor Role	
1967	Divorce American Style	Celia	
1968	The Legend of Lylah Clare	Madame (uncredited)	
1968	How Sweet It Is!	Woman	
1969	Justine	Fat Woman (uncredited)	
1972	Last of the Red Hot Lovers	Cashier (Harriet)	
1974	Black Eye	Woman on the Beach	
1974	For Pete’s Sake	Lady in Supermarket	
1978	The Cheap Detective	Scrub Woman	
1979	Van Nuys Blvd.	Mrs. Zass	
1980	Alligator	Dot (or minor role)	
1980	The Gong Show Movie	Nurse #1	
1981	Scream	Maggie	

=== Television ===
Television
Year	Title	Role	Notes
1952	Death Valley Days	Maudie	
1956	The Dinah Shore Chevy Show	Mother	
1957	Wagon Train	Deet’s 2nd Daughter	
1957	Maverick	Mamacita	
1958	U.S. Marshal	Mrs. Kline	
1959	The Twilight Zone	Woman Yelling for Son	Uncredited
1959	Adventures in Paradise	Elizabeth	
1960	The Slowest Gun in the West	Indian Woman	
1960	My Three Sons	Madame Marushka	
1960	Guestward Ho!	Mrs. Crazy Horse	
1961	Angel	Mrs. Spiegelman	Episode: "Little White Lie"
1962	Gypsy	Stage Mother	Uncredited
1963	Vacation Playhouse	Unknown	
1963	My Favorite Martian	Mrs. Gallup	
1964	The Munsters	Momma	
1964	The Addams Family	Maria the Duenna	Episode: "Morticia's Dilemma"
1964	The Man from U.N.C.L.E.	Apartment Manager	
1964	Gomer Pyle, U.S.M.C.	Elderly Lady	
1965	F Troop	Old Squaw – Wild Turkey	
1965	Honey West	Mexican Woman	
1965	Tammy	Sybelline Tate	Swamp sister
1966	That Girl	Martha	
1966	Hey, Landlord!	Flo	
1967	Good Morning World	Fifi	
1967	The Danny Thomas Hour	Oracle of the Cave	
1967	Mannix	Aggie LeFarge	Episode: "A Question of Murder"
1968	The Mod Squad	Mrs. Wollitzer	
1969	The Brady Bunch	Gladys Harris	
1969	Love, American Style	The Guard	Segment: "The Lady Prisoner"
1970	McCloud	Joanne Newman	
1970	The Odd Couple	Aunt Lucille	Episode: S3E17
1971	Nanny and the Professor	Landlady	
1971	Something Evil	Mrs. Gehrmann	TV movie
1972	Last of the Red Hot Lovers	Cashier	TV movie version
1972	Maude	Aunt Tinkie	Also appeared in 1978
1972	The Waltons	Unknown	Guest role
1973	Lotsa Luck	Lady With Purse	1 Episode
1974	Rhoda	Various roles	Guest appearances
1975	Doc	Guest role	
1976	Baretta	Various roles	
1976	Delvecchio	Guest role	
1977	Serpico	Guest role	
1977	Baby I’m Back	Guest role	
1979-1980	One Day at a Time	Guest role	
1981	The Facts of Life	Guest role	
1980	The Ugilly Family	Tillie	TV pilot

=== Theatre ===
- A Family Affair (1962, Cameo Playhouse)
- Bandicoot (1970, Actor’s Theatre Company)
