= Arthur Hiller =

Canadian film and television director (1923–2016)

Arthur Hiller OC
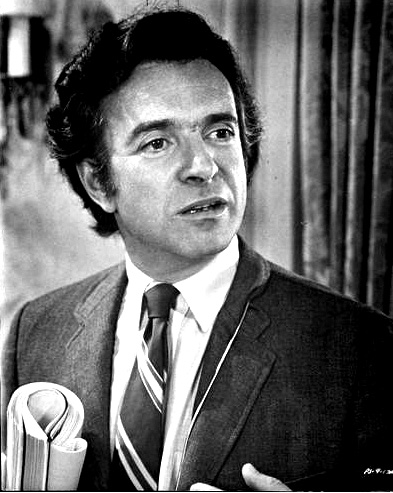
- Hiller directing Love Story in 1970
- Born: November 22, 1923; Edmonton, Alberta, Canada
- Died: August 17, 2016 (aged 92); Los Angeles, California, U.S.
- Resting place: Mount Sinai Memorial Park Cemetery; Los Angeles, California, U.S.
- Education: Victoria School of the Arts; University College, Toronto (B.A., 1947)
- Occupation: Director
- Years active: 1955–2006
- Notable work: Love Story
- Style: Comedy-drama; Slapstick comedy; Tragedy; Drama; Satire
- Spouse: Gwen Pechet (m. 1948; died 2016)
- Children: 2
- Military career
- Allegiance: Canada
- Branch: Royal Canadian Air Force
- Service years: 1941–1945
- Unit: 427 Lion Squadron
- Conflicts: World War II; European theatre

President of the Directors Guild of America
- In office 1989–1993
- Preceded by: Franklin J. Schaffner
- Succeeded by: Gene Reynolds

President of the Academy of Motion Picture Arts and Sciences
- In office 1993–1997
- Preceded by: Robert Rehme
- Succeeded by: Robert Rehme

Arthur Hiller, OC (November 22, 1923 (Note: The New York Times says he was born on November 13, 1923, while most other sources list it as the 22nd (Los Angeles Times, Film Reference, The Hollywood Reporter, and Katz's Film Encyclopedia).) – August 17, 2016) was a Canadian film and television director. He directed over 33 feature films during a 50-year career. He began his career directing television in Canada and later in the U.S. By the late 1950s, he was directing films, most often comedies, but also dramas and romantic subjects, such as in Love Story (1970), which was nominated for seven Academy Awards, including for Best Director.

Hiller collaborated on films with screenwriters Paddy Chayefsky and Neil Simon. Among his notable films were The Hospital (1971), Silver Streak (1976), The In-Laws (1979), Making Love (1982), and Outrageous Fortune (1987).

He served as the 19th President of the Directors Guild of America from 1989 to 1993 and President of the Academy of Motion Picture Arts and Sciences from 1993 to 1997. He was the recipient of the Jean Hersholt Humanitarian Award in 2002. An annual film festival in Hiller's honor was held from 2006 until 2009 at his alma mater, Victoria School of Performing and Visual Arts.

== Early life ==
Hiller was born in November 1923 in Edmonton, Alberta, the son of Rose (née Garfin) and Harry Hiller. His family was Jewish, and had emigrated from Congress Poland (then part of the Russian Empire) in 1912. He had two sisters, one 13 years older and one 11 years older. His father operated a second-hand musical instruments store in Edmonton. Hiller recalled that when he occasionally traveled home while he was in college, the black people he met with "treated me like a king. Why? Because they loved my father. They told me that unlike other shopkeepers, he treated them like normal folks when they went to his store. He didn't look down on them".

Although his parents were not theater professionals, they enjoyed putting on a Jewish play once or twice a year for the Jewish community of 450 people, mainly to keep in touch with their heritage. Hiller recalls they started up the Yiddish theatre when he was seven or eight years old; he helped set carpenters build and decorate the sets. When he was eleven, he got a role acting as an old man, wearing a long beard and the payot. He says that "the love of theater and music and literature my parents instilled in me" contributed to his later career in TV and film.

=== Military service ===
After graduating from high school, Hiller briefly attended the University of Alberta, before joining the Royal Canadian Air Force in 1941 during World War II. He served with 427 Lion Squadron as a navigator on four-engine Handley Page Halifax heavy bombers flying from Yorkshire on operations over Nazi-controlled territory in Europe.

After he returned from serving in the military, Hiller enrolled in and later graduated from University College, Toronto with a Bachelor of Arts in 1947. After Israel was declared a state in 1948, he and his wife unsuccessfully tried to join the Israeli army. (Note: He said that "Israel was immediately attacked by five different Arab armies ... I volunteered, but they turned me down because I was married. I drove down to Seattle to try to volunteer from the United States, but again was turned down because I was married. My wife agreed to volunteer too, but again, 'No.' ... I admire their [Israelis'] determination and dignity of purpose with high ethical standards as they try to make their country safe for democracy, while the countries around them try to make the Arab world safe from democracy.)

Hiller returned to college and earned a Master of Arts in psychology in 1950. One of his early jobs, after graduating, was with Canadian radio directing various public affairs programs.

== Career ==
Arthur Hiller was calm, quiet and he knew exactly what he wanted. He never told you what to do. He took what you had and very gently focused it. It was such a joy to work with him.

— actress Jean Byron

Hiller began his career as a television director with the Canadian Broadcasting Corporation. NBC, one of the main networks in the United States, seeing his work in Canada, offered him positions directing television dramas. Over the next few years, his work for the small screen included episodes of Thriller, Alfred Hitchcock Presents, The Rifleman, Gunsmoke, Naked City, Perry Mason, and Playhouse 90.

=== 1950s–1960s ===
Hiller directed his first film, The Careless Years (1957), the story of a young couple eloping developed by Bryna Productions. This was followed by This Rugged Land (1962), originally made for television but then released as a film, and then Miracle of the White Stallions (1963), a Walt Disney Productions film.

He directed a satirical anti-war comedy by screenwriter Paddy Chayefsky, The Americanization of Emily (1964), starring James Garner and Julie Andrews. It was the first of two film collaborations with Chayefsky. The film, nominated for two Academy Awards, established Hiller as a notable Hollywood director and, according to critics, "earned him a reputation for flair with sophisticated comedy." The New York Times critic Bosley Crowther wrote that Hiller's "brisk direction" of Chayefsky's script included some "remarkably good writing with some slashing irreverence."

In 1964 Hiller also directed the first episode of the television series The Addams Family. This was followed by the comedy Promise Her Anything (1965), with Warren Beatty and Leslie Caron and Penelope (1966), starring Natalie Wood. In a move away from comedy, he directed the desert warfare drama, Tobruk (1967), starring Rock Hudson and George Peppard, about a North African Campaign during World War II. The film was nominated for one Academy Award and showed Hiller capable of handling action films as well as comedy. Around the same time, he returned to comedy with The Tiger Makes Out (also 1967), starring Eli Wallach and Anne Jackson, and featured Dustin Hoffman's film debut. Popi (1969), recounts the tale of a Puerto Rican widower, starring Alan Arkin, struggling to raise his two young sons in the New York City neighborhood known as Spanish Harlem. Arkin was nominated for a Golden Globe Award for Best Actor.

=== 1970s ===
All I knew at first was that I liked him and respected him, and then I grew to adore him. Whatever Arthur asked of me, I did to the best of my ability. And I was blessed to be in such safe hands. Every piece of that experience was protected. He wasn't casual about his work in any way—you knew exactly what he wanted you to do. He was meticulous.

— Ali MacGraw, on the making of Love Story

Hiller directed Love Story (1970), his best known work and most successful at the box-office. The film stars Ryan O'Neal and Ali MacGraw in a romantic tragedy, and it was nominated for 7 Academy Awards including Best Director. The American Film Institute ranks it No. 9 in their list of the greatest love stories. Critic Roger Ebert disagreed with some critics who felt the story was too contrived: "Why shouldn't we get a little misty during a story about young lovers separated by death? Hiller earns our emotional response because of the way he's directed the movie...The movie is mostly about life, however, not death. And because Hiller makes the lovers into individuals, of course we're moved by the film's conclusion. Why not?"

The following year Hiller again collaborated with screenwriter Paddy Chayevsky in directing The Hospital (1971), a satire starring George C. Scott which has been described as being his best film. It is a black comedy about disillusionment and chaos within a hospital setting. Chayevsky received the Academy Award for Best Original Screenplay. In directing the film, Hiller tried to create a sense of action and movement by keeping the camera mobile and using handheld cameras as much as possible. His goal was to have the camera reflect the chaos and confusion taking place in the hospital. "I've always liked that sort of realistic feel," he states. "I wanted the feeling that the audience was peeking around the corner."

Hiller directed two comedy films in collaboration with playwright Neil Simon. The first film was The Out-of-Towners (1970), starring Jack Lemmon and Sandy Dennis, who were both nominated for Golden Globe awards for their roles. Their next collaboration was Plaza Suite (1971), starring Walter Matthau, which was nominated for the Golden Globe Award for Best Motion Picture. Both films were driven by intense comedy dialogue and were considered "crisply directed" by reviewers.

Hiller returned to directing serious drama with The Man in the Glass Booth (1975), starring Maximilian Schell, in a screen adaptation of a stage play written by Robert Shaw. Schell played the role of a man trying to deal with questions of self-identity and guilt as a survivor of the Holocaust during World War II. For his highly emotional role, Schell was nominated for the Academy Award for Best Actor and the Golden Globe Award.

Returning to comedy, Hiller directed Silver Streak (1976), starring Gene Wilder, Jill Clayburgh and Richard Pryor. The film was well received by critics and is rated No. 95 on the AFI's best comedy films. He directed another comedy, The In-Laws (1979), with Peter Falk and Alan Arkin, which was also a critical and commercial success.

=== 1980s ===
He was good director who wanted to know all about the subject. I took Arthur on a tour of the bars one night. Arthur is a real straight Jewish guy, married to the same woman for a hundred years, kids, and everything so far removed from the scene that it was like he was doing a movie about aliens.

— writer Eric Marcus on the film Making Love (1982)

Hiller directed the film Making Love, which was released in February 1982, a story of a married man coming to terms with his homosexuality. Author! Author! (also 1982), starred Al Pacino. The following year Hiller directed Romantic Comedy (1983), starring Dudley Moore and Mary Steenburgen. His next comedy, The Lonely Guy (1984), starred Steve Martin as a greeting card writer and was followed by Teachers (1984), a comedy-drama film starring Nick Nolte.

Outrageous Fortune (1987) stars Shelley Long and Bette Midler. The film was successful at the box office, with Midler being nominated or winning various awards. The film was followed by See No Evil, Hear No Evil (1989), another comedy again starring Gene Wilder and Richard Pryor. Pryor plays a blind man and Wilder a deaf man who work together to thwart a trio of murderous thieves.

=== 1990s and 2000s ===
The 1990s saw Hiller directing a number of films, most of which received negative or mixed reviews: Taking Care of Business (1990); The Babe (1992), a biographical film about Babe Ruth, portrayed by John Goodman; Married to It (1993) and Carpool (1996). In 1997, Hiller helmed the infamous flop An Alan Smithee Film: Burn Hollywood Burn, which mirrored its title when Hiller requested his name be removed from the picture – thus truly making it an Alan Smithee film. Nine years later, when he was in his 80s, Hiller directed National Lampoon's Pucked (2006), his last film, which stars rock star Jon Bon Jovi.

== Directorial influences ==
In an interview with journalist Robert K. Elder for The Film That Changed My Life, Hiller states that the film Rome, Open City (1945) had had a strong influence on his career because he saw it right after leaving the military where he was a bomber navigator in the Canadian Air Force. The film is set during the Nazi occupation of Italy and shows the priesthood and the Communists teaming up against the enemy forces. Hiller commented, "You just get the strongest emotional feelings about what happened to people in Italy."

Hiller preferred his scripts to contain "good moral values," a preference which he says came from his upbringing. (Note: "I prefer them [scripts] with good moral values, which comes from my parents and my upbringing ... Even in my smaller, lesser films, at least there's an affirmation of the human spirit.") He wanted high quality screenplays whenever possible, which partly explains why he collaborated on multiple films with both Paddy Chayefsky and Neil Simon. Hiller explains his rationale:

Storytelling is innate to the human condition. Its underpinnings are cerebral, emotional, communal, psychological. One of the storyteller's main responsibilities is to resonate in the audience's psyche a certain something at the end of it all, to emotionally move the audience, to compel the audience to "get it" on a visceral level.

== Honours ==
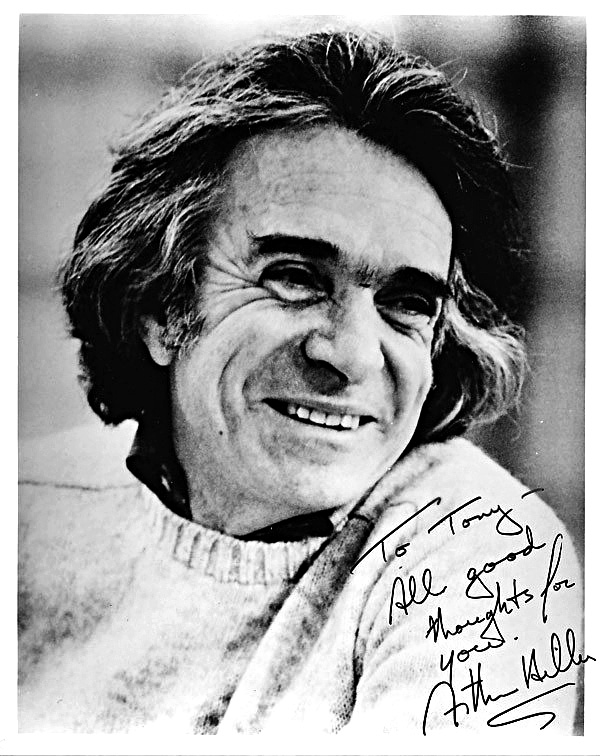
Hiller in the 1970s

Hiller served as president of the Directors Guild of America (DGA) from 1989 to 1993 DGA presented Hiller with the Robert B. Aldrich Award in 1999 and the DGA Honorary Life Member Award in 1993. In 1970 he received a DGA Award nomination for Outstanding Directorial Achievement in Feature Film for Love Story. He was also a member of the National Film Preservation Board of the Library of Congress from 1989 to 2005 and President of the Academy of Motion Picture Arts and Sciences from 1993 to 1997. He also served on the board of the National Student Film Institute.

He received the Jean Hersholt Humanitarian Award at the 2002 Academy Awards ceremony in recognition of his humanitarian, charitable and philanthropic efforts. In 2002, he was honoured with a star on Canada's Walk of Fame in Toronto. In 2006, he was made an Officer of the Order of Canada. Writer and producer William Froug said that "Hiller is that rare and hugely successful gentleman who has remained humble all his life."

He received an honorary degree of Doctor of Fine Arts from the University of Victoria in June 1995. He received an honorary degree of Doctor of Laws (LL.D) from the University of Toronto in November 1995.

== Personal life ==
In 1948, he married Gwen Pechet, who was also Jewish; they had two children and two grandchildren. His wife died on June 24, 2016. They were married for 68 years.

=== Death ===
Hiller died almost two months later in Los Angeles on August 17, 2016, at the age of 92 from natural causes.

== Portrayal in media ==
Hiller was portrayed by actor Jake Regal in the 2022 miniseries The Offer.

== Filmography ==
Year	Title	Director	Producer
1957	The Careless Years	Yes	No
1963	Miracle of the White Stallions	Yes	No
1963	The Wheeler Dealers	Yes	No
1964	The Americanization of Emily	Yes	No
1965	Promise Her Anything	Yes	No
1966	Penelope	Yes	No
1967	Tobruk	Yes	No
1967	The Tiger Makes Out	Yes	No
1969	Popi	Yes	No
1970	The Out-of-Towners	Yes	No
1970	Love Story	Yes	No
1971	The Hospital	Yes	No
1971	Plaza Suite	Yes	No
1972	Man of La Mancha	Yes	Yes
1974	The Crazy World of Julius Vrooder	Yes	Yes
1975	The Man in the Glass Booth	Yes	No
1976	Silver Streak	Yes	No
1976	W. C. Fields and Me	Yes	No
1979	Nightwing	Yes	No
1979	The In-Laws	Yes	Yes
1982	Making Love	Yes	No
1982	Author! Author!	Yes	No
1983	Romantic Comedy	Yes	No
1984	The Lonely Guy	Yes	Yes
1984	Teachers	Yes	No
1987	Outrageous Fortune	Yes	No
1989	See No Evil, Hear No Evil	Yes	No
1990	Taking Care of Business	Yes	No
1991	Married to It	Yes	No
1992	The Babe	Yes	No
1996	Carpool	Yes	No
1997	An Alan Smithee Film: Burn Hollywood Burn (Credited as Alan Smithee)	Yes	No
2006	National Lampoon's Pucked	Yes	No

== Awards and nominations ==
Institution	Year	Category	Nominated work	Result
Academy Awards	1971	Best Director	Love Story	Nominated
Academy Awards	2002	Jean Hersholt Humanitarian Award	—N/a	Won
Avoriaz International Fantastic Film Festival	1980	Grand Prize	Nightwing	Nominated
Berlin International Film Festival	1972	Golden Bear	The Hospital	Nominated
Berlin International Film Festival	1972	Silver Bear Jury Prize	The Hospital	Won
Berlin International Film Festival	1972	OCIC Award	The Hospital	Won
Directors Guild of America Awards	1971	Outstanding Directing – Feature Film	Love Story	Nominated
Directors Guild of America Awards	1993	Honorary Life Member Award	—N/a	Won
Directors Guild of America Awards	1999	Robert B. Aldrich Award	—N/a	Won
Directors Guild of Canada Awards	2004	Lifetime Achievement Award	—N/a	Won
Golden Globe Awards	1971	Best Director	Love Story	Won
Golden Raspberry Awards	1999	Worst Director	An Alan Smithee Film: Burn Hollywood Burn	Nominated
Palm Springs International Film Festival	2002	Director's Achievement Award	—N/a	Won
Primetime Emmy Awards	1962	Outstanding Directing for a Drama Series	Naked City	Nominated

== Notes ==
Non-profit organization positions
Preceded by Robert Rehme	President of Academy of Motion Pictures, Arts and Sciences; 1993–1997	Succeeded by Robert Rehme
