= Meg Myles =

American pin-up model, singer, and actress (1934–2019)

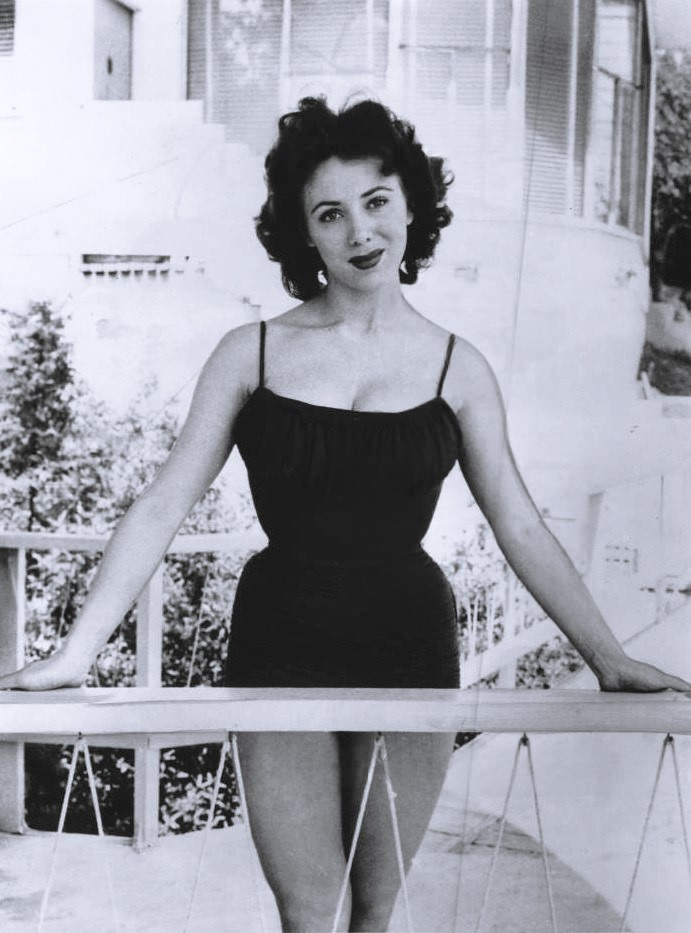
- Myles in 1957
- Born: Billie Jean Jones; November 14, 1934; Seattle, Washington, U.S.
- Died: November 12, 2019 (aged 84)
- Occupations: Actress; singer; pin-up model
- Years active: c. 1955–1995

Meg Myles (born Billie Jean Jones; November 14, 1934 – November 12, 2019) was an American pin-up model, singer, and actress on stage and screen, active mostly in the 1950s and 1960s.

== Biography ==
Myles was born in Seattle. She was a popular model in men's magazines, having purported measurements of 42-24-36. Her best known major film role is as the lead in Satan in High Heels. Meg had a short but important role in the film noir The Phenix City Story (1955). She also had a featured role in the musical film Calypso Heat Wave. She had an uncredited role as the singer at the talent agency in the theatrical release of Dragnet opposite Jack Webb. Her last film role was in Delinquent (1995).

In 1966, she played possessive mother Harriett Wilson on the daytime soap opera The Doctors, and in 1970 appeared on another soap, Where the Heart Is. In the 1980s she was regular on the daytime television mystery serial The Edge of Night as restaurant owner Sid Brennan, and had a year-long role on All My Children as Joanna Yeager, Stuart Chandler's secret wife.

After a year on Search For Tomorrow as the kindly Maevis Stone (mother of heroine Evie Stone), she returned to All My Children for a stint as Joanna, coming back to Pine Valley in the spring of 1987 to try to extort money from Adam Chandler and hold Erica Kane hostage.

Later in life, she lived on the Upper West Side of Manhattan, where the Wall Street Journal reported that she tended to wounded animals, especially birds.

According to IMDb, Myles died at the age of 84 on November 12, 2019, and was featured on the Tony Awards' "In Memoriam 2020" list.
