= National Lampoon's Pucked =

- Promotional poster for National Lampoon's Pucked.
- Directed by: Arthur Hiller
- Screenplay by: Matty Simmons; William Dozier; Sal Catalano; Shakes Mutlin
- Story by: Matty Simmons
- Starring: Jon Bon Jovi; Estella Warren
- Cinematography: Alton Chewning
- Edited by: Dan Schalk
- Music by: Stewart Copeland; Kat Green; Billy Lincoln; Rich McCulley
- Release date: February 10, 2006
- Running time: 83 minutes
- Country: United States
- Language: English
- Budget: $3,500,000

National Lampoon's Pucked (also known as Pucked, and National Lampoon's The Trouble with Frank) is a 2006 American sports comedy film starring Jon Bon Jovi in the main role. This is the last film directed by Arthur Hiller before his death in 2016.

== Plot ==
Frank Hopper is a former lawyer, who receives a credit card in the mail, and believes he's hit the jackpot. It's not long before he's working his way toward financing his dream – an all-woman hockey team. He's also put himself in debt to more than $300,000. He winds up in court when his plan backfires.

== Cast ==
- Jon Bon Jovi as Frank Hopper
- Estella Warren as Jessica
- David Faustino as Carl
- Curtis Armstrong as Janitor
- Nora Dunn as Leona
- Cary Elwes as Norman
- Pat Kilbane as Elvis
- Dana Barron as Tiny
- Danielle James as herself

== See also ==
- List of films about ice hockey
