= Married to It =

- Theatrical release poster
- Directed by: Arthur Hiller
- Written by: Janet Kovalcik
- Produced by: Thomas Baer
- Starring: Beau Bridges; Stockard Channing; Robert Sean Leonard; Mary Stuart Masterson; Cybill Shepherd; Ron Silver
- Cinematography: Victor J. Kemper
- Edited by: Robert C. Jones
- Music by: Henry Mancini
- Distributed by: Orion Pictures
- Release dates: September 11, 1991 (Canada); March 26, 1993 (U.S.)
- Running time: 112 minutes
- Country: United States
- Language: English
- Budget: $14 million
- Box office: $2,059,832

Married to It is a 1991 American comedy-drama film directed by Arthur Hiller starring Beau Bridges, Stockard Channing, Robert Sean Leonard, Mary Stuart Masterson, Cybill Shepherd and Ron Silver. The film is about three New York City couples with disparate careers, ages, and lifestyles who bond through their mutual connection to a local private school. As they help to stage a school pageant with a 1960s theme, each couple begins to quarrel and reassess their marriage.

== Plot ==
Three couples meet by chance at a private school fundraiser and come together to organize a school pageant while becoming friends. Claire and Leo LaRonde are two fast-talking yuppies. Leo runs a doll-making company. Claire is a savvy businesswoman but not a very good maternal figure to Lucy, Leo's daughter from a past marriage. Lucy and Claire have a strained relationship. John and Iris Morden are a pair of worn-out hippies with two preteen sons, John works in welfare while Iris is a housewife who takes up some artsy jobs, especially with the school here and there. Nina and Charles (Chuck) Bishop are an earnest and hopeful young couple from Iowa, who are worried about making their young marriage last. Chuck is an ambitious stockbroker and Nina is a school psychologist at the school where Iris and Leo's kids attend. Although they face a slightly awkward start, together these three couples face various challenges and learn about their marital problems as well as each other.

== Cast ==
- Beau Bridges as John Morden
- Stockard Channing as Iris Morden
- Robert Sean Leonard as Chuck Bishop
- Mary Stuart Masterson as Nina Bishop
- Cybill Shepherd as Claire Laurent
- Ron Silver as Leo Rothenberg
- Don Francks as Sol Chamberlain
- Donna Vivino as Lucy Rothenberg
- Jimmy Shea as Marty Morden
- Nathaniel Moreau as Kenny Morden
- Diane D'Aquila as Madeleine Rothenberg
- Chris Wiggins as Dave
- Paul Gross as Jeremy Brimfield
- Gerry Bamman as Arthur Everson
- Djanet Sears as Mrs. Foster
- George Sperdakos as Murray
- Larry Reynolds as Mullaney
- Edward I. Koch as Himself
- Louis Di Bianco as Romero
- George Guidall as Lawyer
- Chris Bickford as Student
- Jason Pechet as Student
- Marc Gomes as Ross
- Philip Akin as Limo Driver
- Gregory Jbara as Cafe Waiter
- Aaron Ashmore as Student in Pageant
- Shawn Ashmore as Student in Pageant
- Kelly Campbell as Student in Pageant
- Tara Strong as Student in Pageant (credited as Tara Charendoff)
- Former New York City mayor Ed Koch appears as himself in a cameo.

== Reception ==
Film site Rotten Tomatoes gives the film a score of 30% based on 10 critic reviews.

Film critic Roger Ebert wrote that "We can more or less predict what will happen to [the] characters the moment we see how the roles were cast," that "a subplot involving Leonard’s troubles at work is so artificial and contrived the actors seem to be reading their lines over each other’s shoulders," and that "[a]t one point [the film] seemed destined to go directly to TV and the video stores. That would have been appropriate." Writing in The Washington Post, critic Rita Kempley described the film as "principally a TV sitcom with elephantiasis," that the "sodden aphorisms of Janet Kovalcik's script pile up like used towels in a gym hamper," and that the film "is more than a bummer, it's mental cruelty."
