= Popi =

1969 film by Arthur Hiller

- Original poster
- Directed by: Arthur Hiller
- Written by: Tina Pine; Lester Pine
- Produced by: Herbert B. Leonard
- Starring: Alan Arkin; Rita Moreno
- Cinematography: Andrew Laszlo
- Edited by: Anthony Ciccolini
- Music by: Dominic Frontiere
- Distributed by: United Artists
- Release date: May 27, 1969
- Running time: 113 minutes
- Country: United States
- Language: English
- Box office: $2 million (US/ Canada rentals)

Popi is a 1969 American comedy-drama film directed by Arthur Hiller, and starring Alan Arkin (in the title role) and Rita Moreno. The screenplay was written by Tina Pine and Lester Pine. The film focuses on a Puerto Rican widower struggling to raise his two young sons in the New York City neighborhood of Spanish Harlem.

== Plot ==
Abraham Rodriguez, known as Popi to his sons Luis and Junior, supports them by working three jobs, leaving him little time to supervise them. He hopes to earn enough to marry his girlfriend Lupe and move the family into a better home in Brooklyn. Then reality crashes in as the boys see gangs do violence in the neighborhood and are even victimized when their clothes are stolen from them. While working at a banquet in New York for Cuban exiles, he hatches an idea. Realizing his boys have a better chance of making good as political refugees than products of the ghetto in which he's raising them, he plots to set them adrift in a rowboat off the coast of Miami Beach in the hope they will be mistaken for escapees from Cuba and offered asylum. After teaching them how to row a boat in the lake in Central Park and how to handle a motorboat on the East River, they depart for Florida.

Popi steals a boat in Miami Beach and tells the boys to take it out until they run out of fuel, then remove the outboard motor and begin to row back to shore. When he is unable to convince the Coast Guard that the boys are out there, he fears they are lost until he hears a radio report about the heroic rescue of two young "Cuban" boys. Luis and Junior, suffering from dehydration and severe sunburn. The boys are hospitalized, and soon find themselves indundated with flowers and toys from thousands of well-wishers, many of whom offer to adopt them. Wearing a disguise, Popi sneaks into their hospital room and tries to convince them they are better off being raised by wealthy parents. The three begin to argue loudly in English, alerting the staff and prompting Popi to flee, followed by his sons. Much to the relief of the boys, their hoax is exposed, and they happily return to their impoverished life in the barrio with their loving father.

== Cast ==
- Alan Arkin as Abraham Rodriguez
- Rita Moreno as Lupe
- Reuben Figueroa as Luis
- Miguel Alejandro as Junior
- Louis Zorich as Penebaz

== Critical reception ==
The movie opened to good reviews, with Arkin especially being singled out for praise. Roger Ebert of the Chicago Sun-Times said the film "splits apart in the middle. The first half, set in New York, is rich and warm, filled with the flavor of city life. The second half, involving the Florida plan, functions only on the level of TV situation comedy. It is simply not believable . . . That is not to say that Popi isn't an engaging movie. It is, largely because the kids were well cast and because of Arkin."

Variety observed, "Arkin is given too much free rein for his very personal style, and is sometimes guilty of working a scene, meant to be poignant or even dramatic, for a laugh, which he usually gets. The undecided mood of the film works against it for any lasting impression on the viewer."

== Awards and nominations ==
For the second year in a row, Alan Arkin won the Kansas City Film Critics Circle Award for Best Actor, after being honored the previous year for his performance in The Heart Is a Lonely Hunter. He was nominated for the Golden Globe Award for Best Actor – Motion Picture Drama but lost to John Wayne in True Grit.

Tina Pine and Lester Pine were nominated for the Writers Guild of America Award for Best Original Screenplay but lost to William Goldman for Butch Cassidy and the Sundance Kid.

== TV series ==
A TV series with the same name, a sitcom based on the same subject, aired in 1976, starring Héctor Elizondo as Popi.

== Home media ==
The film was released on DVD in fullscreen format on April 1, 2003. It has audio tracks in English and Spanish and subtitles in English, Spanish, and French.
