= Last of the Red Hot Lovers (film) =

1972 film by Gene Saks

- Theatrical release poster
- Directed by: Gene Saks
- Written by: Neil Simon
- Based on: Last of the Red Hot Lovers by Neil Simon
- Produced by: Howard W. Koch
- Starring: Alan Arkin; Sally Kellerman; Paula Prentiss; Renée Taylor
- Cinematography: Victor J. Kemper
- Edited by: Maury Winetrobe
- Music by: Neil Hefti
- Distributed by: Paramount Pictures
- Release date: July 12, 1972 (Los Angeles)
- Running time: 98 minutes
- Country: United States
- Language: English

Neil Simon's Last of the Red Hot Lovers is a 1972 American comedy film based on Neil Simon's 1969 play of the same name. Alan Arkin, Sally Kellerman, Paula Prentiss and Renée Taylor star in it.

== Plot ==
Waking up beside his wife and bored with his life, seafood restaurant owner Barney Cashman finds the flirtation of Elaine Navazio appealing enough that he arranges a rendezvous at his mother's apartment.

Barney hems and haws there to Elaine's exasperation. She drinks and warns him they have only a limited amount of time. His reluctance and clumsiness irritate her. Barney confesses that he doesn't smoke, drink or gamble and wants his first fling to be meaningful. Elaine mocks him and leaves.

On a park bench, beautiful Bobbi Michele asks to borrow $20. She offers her gratitude in a way that persuades Barney to again attempt an affair. At the apartment, Bobbi arrives in a sexy short dress, but Barney soon realizes she is not only unsuccessful but unhappy and neurotic. She convinces him to smoke marijuana, but both end up in tears.

Vowing never to be unfaithful again, Barney accompanies his wife to a party thrown by friends Jeanette and Mel Fisher. It soon becomes clear that Mel's been seeing someone on the side, which leads to Jeanette's ending up with Barney at the apartment. He tries to be suave, then strips off his clothes in a futile attempt at seduction.

With the realization that he was not meant to be a red-hot lover, Barney calls his wife on the phone, inviting her to the apartment.

== Cast ==
- Alan Arkin as Barney Cashman
- Sally Kellerman as Elaine Navazio
- Paula Prentiss as Bobbi Michele
- Renée Taylor as Jeanette
- Bella Bruck as Cashier
- Sandy Balson as Charlotte
- Frank Loverde as Mel
- Bert Conroy as Bert (as Burt Conroy)
- Charles Woolf as Jesse
- Ben Freedman as Mickey

== Reception ==
Roger Greenspun of The New York Times said: "In the dismal history of Neil Simon screenplays and adaptations for the screen, The Last of the Red Hot Lovers may represent the lowest ebb. ...There is obviously profit in that discomfort, and a kind of recognition value (like the dark side to a TV situation comedy) and sometimes a kind of sour wit. I can imagine a very hammy production of Last of the Red Hot Lovers that might satisfy for as long as it took to say the lines. But this movie version strives for a dismal realism that plays under the lines and doesn't even support their potential for theatrical excitement." Variety wrote that a "very funny play" had "been made into a funny motion picture. The absence of the word 'very' is the principal difference between the two versions and as Doc Simon himself handled the transition, the only excuse for the drop in laughter volume is, possibly, over-familiarity." Gene Siskel of the Chicago Tribune gave the film two-and-a-half stars out of four and called Sally Kellerman's character "an original beautifully played," but as the film winds down "we wish that Miss Kellerman would quickly return. She never does." Charles Champlin of the Los Angeles Times agreed, writing, "After the stunning confrontation of Arkin and Sally Kellerman, everything else is a bit of a letdown." Nevertheless, he found the film "a substantial moviegoing experience, funny and touching, and its troubles stem, refreshingly, from trying not too little but too much."

In his annual Movie Guide, Leonard Maltin gave the film a BOMB rating, calling it "a shoddy production for which the term 'photographed stage play' must have been invented."

== See also ==
- List of American films of 1972
