= Alan Arkin =

American actor and filmmaker (1934–2023)

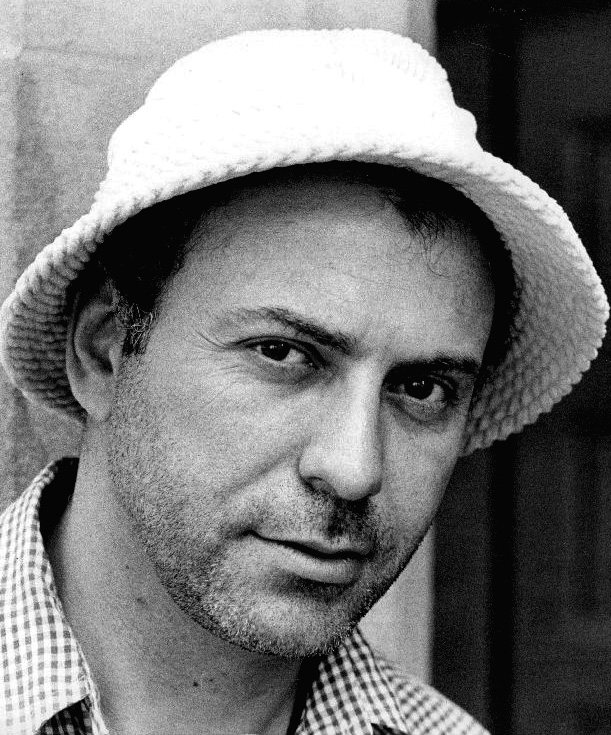
- Arkin in 1975
- Born: Alan Wolf Arkin; March 26, 1934; New York City, U.S.
- Died: June 29, 2023 (aged 89); Carlsbad, California, U.S.
- Occupations: Actor; filmmaker; musician
- Years active: 1951–2023
- Works: Full list
- Spouses: Jeremy Yaffe (m. 1955; div. 1961); Barbara Dana (m. 1964; div. 1994); Suzanne Newlander (m. 1996)
- Children: 3, including Adam and Matthew
- Parents: David I. Arkin (father); Beatrice Arkin (mother)
- Relatives: Joseph Wortis (uncle); Avi (cousin)
- Awards: Full list

Alan Wolf Arkin (March 26, 1934 – June 29, 2023) was an American actor, filmmaker and musician. In a career spanning seven decades, he received numerous accolades, including an Academy Award, a BAFTA Award, a Golden Globe Award, and a Tony Award as well as nominations for six Emmy Awards.

Arkin performed in the sketch comedy group The Second City before acting on the Broadway stage, starring as David Kolowitz in the Joseph Stein play Enter Laughing in 1963, for which he won the Tony Award for Best Featured Actor in a Play. He returned to Broadway acting in the comedic play Luv (1964), and directed Neil Simon's The Sunshine Boys (1971), for which he received a Tony Award nomination.

Arkin won the Academy Award for Best Supporting Actor for his role as a foul-mouthed grandfather in Little Miss Sunshine (2006). He was Oscar-nominated for his roles in The Russians Are Coming, The Russians Are Coming (1966), The Heart is a Lonely Hunter (1968), and Argo (2012). He also acted in Wait Until Dark (1967), Inspector Clouseau (1968), Popi (1969), Catch-22 (1970), The In-Laws (1979), Edward Scissorhands (1990), The Rocketeer (1991), Glengarry Glen Ross (1992), Grosse Pointe Blank (1997), Thirteen Conversations About One Thing (2001), Little Miss Sunshine (2006), Get Smart (2008), Going in Style (2017), Dumbo (2019) and Spenser Confidential (2020). Arkin also directed three films, including the comedies Little Murders (1971) and Fire Sale (1977).

His television roles included Leon Felhendler in Escape from Sobibor (1987), and as Harry Rowen in The Pentagon Papers (2003) for which he earned Emmy nominations, respectively, for Outstanding Lead Actor in a Limited Series or Movie and Outstanding Supporting Actor in a Limited Series or Movie. Arkin voiced Schmendrick in The Last Unicorn (1982), J. D. Salinger in the animated series BoJack Horseman (2015–16), and Wild Knuckles in Minions: The Rise of Gru (2022). From 2018 to 2019, Arkin starred in the Netflix comedy series The Kominsky Method, earning two consecutive nominations for the Primetime Emmy Award for Outstanding Supporting Actor in a Comedy Series.

== Early life and education ==
Alan Wolf Arkin was born in Brooklyn, a borough of New York City, on March 26, 1934, the son of teacher, painter, writer and lyricist David I. Arkin (1906–1980) (co-writer of the hit Three Dog Night song "Black and White"), and his wife, Beatrice (née Wortis; 1909–1991), a teacher. His grandparents were Jewish immigrants from Ukraine, Russia, and Germany. The family, which had "no emphasis on religion", lived in Crown Heights, before moving to Los Angeles when Alan was 11. An eight-month Hollywood strike cost his father his job as a set designer. During the 1950s Red Scare, Arkin's parents were accused of being Communists, and his father was fired when he refused to answer questions about his political ideology. David Arkin challenged the dismissal, but he was vindicated only after his death.

Arkin, who had been taking acting lessons since age 10, became a scholarship student at various drama academies, including one run by the Stanislavsky student Benjamin Zemach, who taught Arkin a psychological approach to acting. Arkin attended Los Angeles State College from 1951 to 1953. He also attended Bennington College.

== Career ==
=== 1956–1969 ===
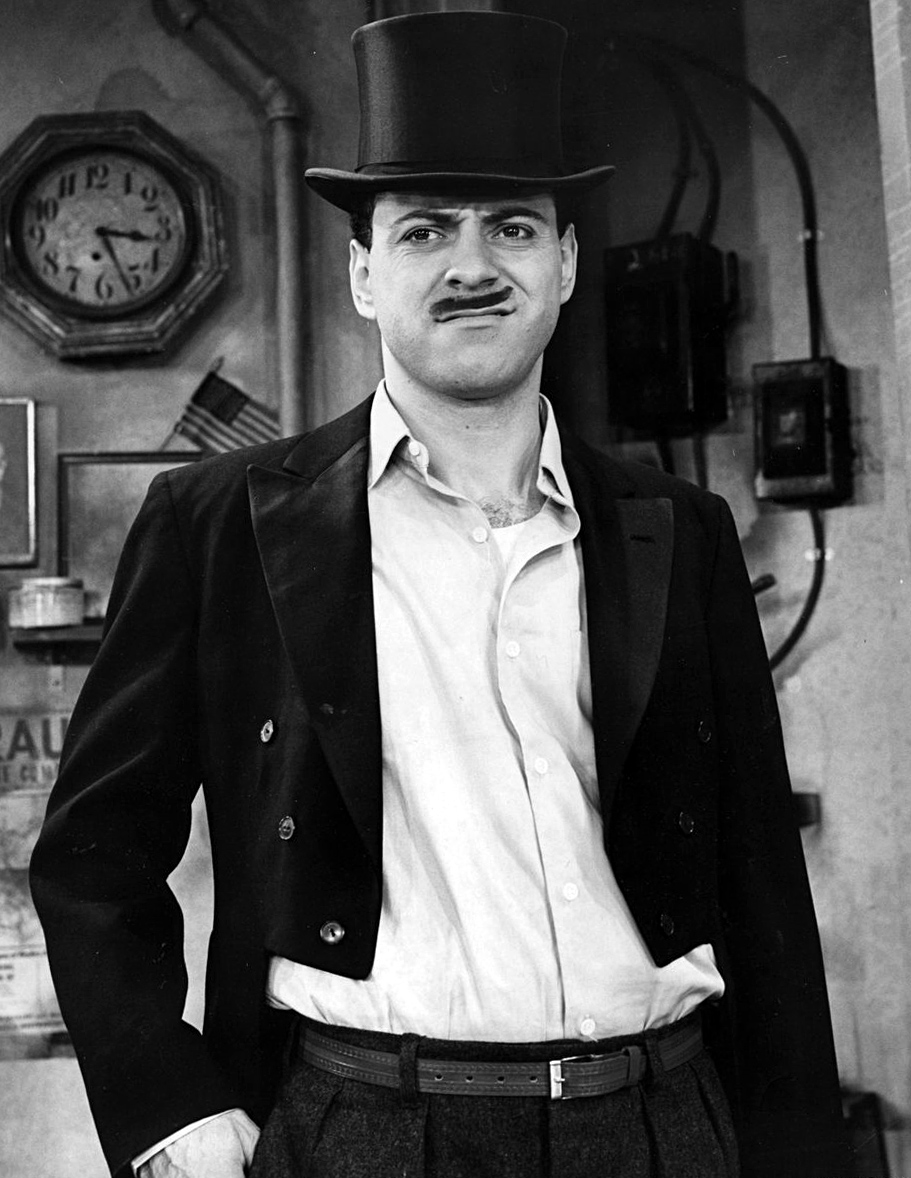
Arkin in the Broadway play Enter Laughing (1963)

He started his career in the 1950s as a singer and guitarist in the folk group, The Tarriers. They had two hits in 1956–7: "Cindy, Oh Cindy" and "Day-O (The Banana Boat Song)". They performed the latter in the 1957 musical movie, Calypso Heat Wave, and sang "Choucoune" in this too. Arkin went on to sing with another folk group, The Baby Sitters. Arkin was an early member of the Second City comedy troupe in the 1960s. In 1957, he made his feature film acting debut in a small role in the musical Calypso Heat Wave. In the early sixties, he appeared in episodes of East Side/West Side (1964) and ABC Stage 67 (1966). He also made his Broadway debut as a performer in From the Second City at the Royale Theatre in 1961.

Arkin starred in 1963 on Broadway as David Kolowitz in Joseph Stein's comedic play Enter Laughing. Critic Howard Taubman of The New York Times gave the play a mixed review but praised Arkin's performance, describing it as "a choice specimen of a shrewd actor ribbing his profession." For his performance, he received the Tony Award for Best Featured Actor in a Play, and a Theatre World Award. The following year, he returned to Broadway starring as Harry Berlin in Luv directed by Mike Nichols. Arkin starred opposite Eli Wallach and Anne Jackson.

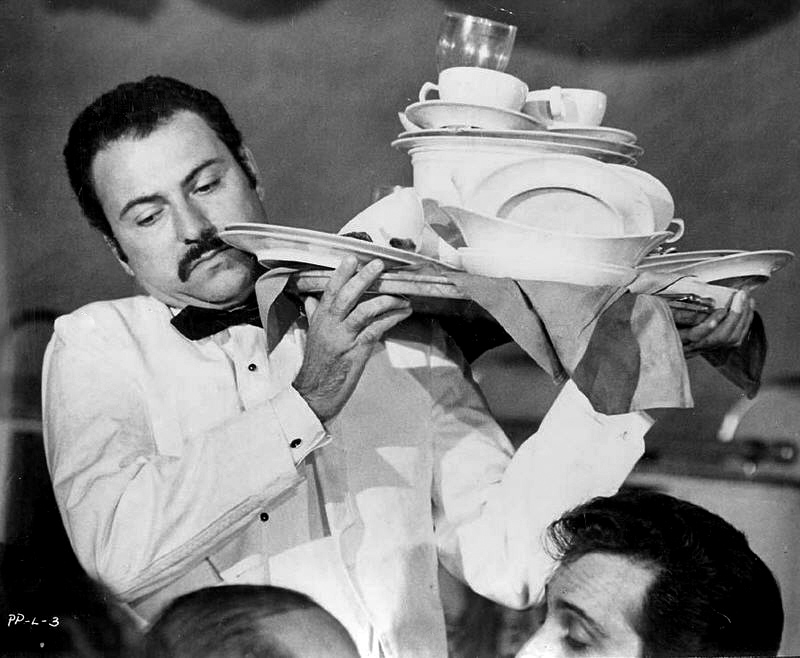
Arkin in Popi (1969)

In 1966, he starred in Norman Jewison's comedy film The Russians Are Coming, the Russians Are Coming opposite Carl Reiner and Eva Marie Saint. Robert Alden of The New York Times praised Arkin's performance describing it as his "first full-length film appearance and a particularly wonderful performance." For his performance Arkin received an Academy Award for Best Actor nomination and a BAFTA Award for Most Promising Newcomer nomination. He also received the Golden Globe Award for Best Actor – Motion Picture Musical or Comedy. The following year he appeared in the Vittorio De Sica sex comedy Woman Times Seven starring Shirley MacLaine, and in Terence Young's psychological thriller film Wait Until Dark starring Audrey Hepburn.

In 1968, he starred as Inspector Jacques Clouseau in the third installment of The Pink Panther franchise, titled Inspector Clouseau, after Peter Sellers dissociated himself from the role. The film was not well received by Sellers' fans and critics, but Penelope Gilliatt of The New Yorker called it "an incredibly bad film, but Alan Arkin is sometimes very funny in it, especially when he doesn't try to be." That same year, he co-starred with Sondra Locke in The Heart Is a Lonely Hunter, playing a suicidal deaf mute. For his performance, he received nominations for an Academy Award for Best Actor and a Golden Globe Award for Best Actor – Motion Picture Drama, and won a New York Film Critics Circle Award for Best Actor. In 1969, he starred in Arthur Hiller's comedy Popi opposite Rita Moreno. The film focuses on a Puerto Rican widower struggling to raise his two young sons in the New York City neighborhood of Spanish Harlem. Arkin received another nomination for the Golden Globe Award for Best Actor – Motion Picture Drama.

In 1969, Arkin's directorial debut was the Oscar-nominated 12-minute children's film titled People Soup, starring his sons Adam Arkin and Matthew Arkin. Based on a story of the same name he published in Galaxy Science Fiction in 1958, People Soup is a fantasy about two boys who experiment with various kitchen ingredients until they concoct a magical soup which transforms them into different animals and objects.

=== 1970–1985 ===
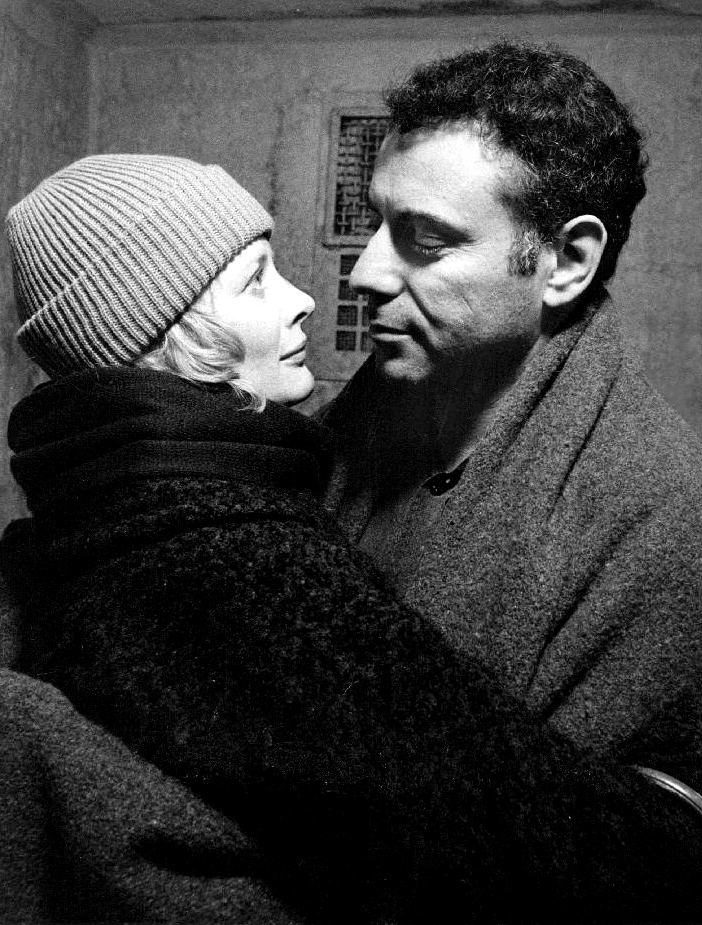
With Shirley Knight in the TV special The Defection of Simas Kudirka (1978)

In 1970, Arkin starred as Capt. John Yossarian in the Mike Nichols film Catch-22. The film is a satirical black comedy war film adapted from the 1961 novel of the same name by Joseph Heller. Arkin co-starred alongside Bob Balaban, Martin Balsam, Buck Henry, Bob Newhart, Austin Pendleton, Martin Sheen, Jon Voight, and Orson Welles. Arkin received a Laurel Award nomination for his performance. Arkin and his second wife Barbara Dana appeared together on the 1970–1971 season of Sesame Street as a comical couple named Larry and Phyllis who resolve their conflicts when they remember how to pronounce the word "cooperate".

He directed the black comedy film Little Murders, which was released in 1971 and later became a cult classic. Written by cartoonist Jules Feiffer, it is a black comedy film starring Elliott Gould and Marcia Rodd about a girl, Patsy (Rodd), who brings home her boyfriend Alfred (Gould) to meet her dysfunctional family amid a series of random shootings, garbage strikes, and electrical outages ravaging the neighborhood. The film opened to a lukewarm review by Roger Greenspun, and a more positive one by Vincent Canby in The New York Times. Roger Ebert's review in the Chicago Sun-Times was enthusiastic, stating "One of the reasons it works and is indeed a definitive reflection of America's darker moods is that it breaks audiences down into isolated individuals, vulnerable and uncertain." Arkin also directed Fire Sale (1977).

During the 1970s, Arkin starred in films of various genres including the Vernon Zimmerman road comedy Deadhead Miles (1972), the Gene Saks adaptation of the Neil Simon play of the same name Last of the Red Hot Lovers (1972) with Sally Kellerman and Paula Prentiss, the black comedy action film Freebie and the Bean (1974), the dramedy Rafferty and the Gold Dust Twins (1975) with Kellerman and Mackenzie Phillips, the 1978 TV prison film The Other Side of Hell (1978), the western comedy Hearts of the West (1975), and the British mystery The Seven-Per-Cent Solution (1976). In 1973, Arkin directed the Broadway production of Neil Simon's The Sunshine Boys. He received the Tony Award for Best Direction of a Play nomination, losing to A. J. Antoon for That Championship Season. In 1979, he starred in and co-produced the buddy comedy film The In-Laws. Arkin starred opposite Peter Falk in a film directed by Arthur Hiller and written by Andrew Bergman.

In 1980, Arkin starred in the Marshall Brickman comedy Simon which gained mixed reviews but earned him a Saturn Award nomination. The following year, he starred in three comedy films, Improper Channels, Chu Chu and the Philly Flash opposite Carol Burnett, and Full Moon High. He also voiced the magician Schmendrick in the 1982 cult animated film The Last Unicorn. During the 1980s, Arkin appeared frequently in various television programs including The Muppet Show and St. Elsewhere. In 1985, Arkin starred in the television film The Fourth Wise Man starring Martin Sheen and Eileen Brennan. He won Best Supporting Actor at the Genie Awards for his role as Reuben Shapiro in the 1985 film adaption of Mordecai Richler's semi-autobiographical novel Joshua Then and Now.

=== 1986–2001 ===
In 1987, Arkin appeared in the sitcom Harry, which was canceled after four low-rated episodes. Also more importantly in that same year, he starred in another television film Escape from Sobibor portraying Leon Felhendler. The film revolves around the mass escape from the Nazi extermination camp at Sobibor. Arkin received nominations for the Primetime Emmy Award for Outstanding Lead Actor in a Limited or Anthology Series or Movie and the Golden Globe Award for Best Supporting Actor – Series, Miniseries or Television Film.

In 1990, Arkin appeared in a supporting role in Tim Burton's fantasy romance Edward Scissorhands starring Johnny Depp and Winona Ryder. He also appeared in the live action Disney film The Rocketeer (1991) starring Bill Campbell and Jennifer Connelly, and the film adaptation of the David Mamet play Glengarry Glen Ross (1992) starring Al Pacino, Jack Lemmon, and Kevin Spacey. In 1993, he appeared in the comedies Indian Summer and So I Married an Axe Murderer. The following year, Arkin featured in the Rob Reiner film North.

In 1996, Arkin appeared in the film adaptation of the Kurt Vonnegut novel Mother Night starring Nick Nolte, Sheryl Lee, John Goodman, and Kirsten Dunst. The following year Arkin appeared in the comedy Grosse Point Blank starring John Cusack as well as the dystopian science fiction film Gattaca with Ethan Hawke. In 1998, he starred in the lead role of Tamara Jenkins' comedy Slums of Beverly Hills with Natasha Lyonne. Arkin also directed Samuel Beckett Is Coming Soon (1993) and Arigo (2000).

=== 2001−2023 ===
In 2001, he appeared in the comedy America's Sweethearts starring John Cusack, Julia Roberts, Billy Crystal, and Catherine Zeta-Jones. He also starred in the Jill Sprecher drama Thirteen Conversations About One Thing with Matthew McConaughey, John Turturro, and Clea DuVall. For his performance, he received the Boston Society of Film Critics Award for Best Supporting Actor. In 2003, he starred in the television film The Pentagon Papers starring James Spader and Paul Giamatti for which he received a Primetime Emmy Award for Outstanding Supporting Actor in a Limited or Anthology Series or Movie nomination. That same year, he starred in another television film And Starring Pancho Villa as Himself with Antonio Banderas. In 2005, he appeared as Marty Adler in the NBC sitcom Will & Grace in the episode "It's a Dad, Dad, Dad, Dad World".

In 2006, Arkin appeared in a supporting role in the ensemble comedy-drama Little Miss Sunshine with Greg Kinnear, Steve Carell, Toni Collette, Paul Dano, and Abigail Breslin. His role in the independent film as a foul-mouthed grandfather with a taste for snorting heroin won him the Independent Spirit Award for Best Supporting Male; the BAFTA Award for Best Actor in a Supporting Role; and the Academy Award for Best Actor in a Supporting Role. At 72 years old, Arkin was the sixth oldest winner of the Best Supporting Actor Oscar. On receiving his Academy Award on February 25, 2007, Arkin said:

More than anything, I'm deeply moved by the open-hearted appreciation our small film has received, which in these fragmented times speaks so openly of the possibility of innocence, growth, and connection.

In between 2006 and 2007, Arkin was cast in supporting roles in Rendition as a U.S. Senator Hawkins and The Santa Clause 3: The Escape Clause as Bud Newman, with Ann-Margret playing his wife. In 2008, he appeared in the comedy films Sunshine Cleaning with Emily Blunt and Amy Adams, Get Smart with Steve Carell, Anne Hathaway, and Dwayne Johnson, and Marley & Me starring Owen Wilson and Jennifer Aniston. The following year, he appeared in Rebecca Miller's The Private Lives of Pippa Lee and Raymond De Felitta's City Island (both 2010).

In 2012, he appeared in a supporting role as Hollywood producer Lester Siegel in Ben Affleck's drama Argo with Affleck, John Goodman, and Bryan Cranston. For his performance, he received his fourth Academy Award nomination, his second for Best Supporting Actor, losing to Christoph Waltz in Django Unchained. He also received nominations for the Golden Globe Award, the BAFTA Award, and Screen Actors Guild Award. He did receive the Screen Actors Guild Award for Outstanding Performance by a Cast in a Motion Picture. That same year, he appeared in the crime drama Stand Up Guys, opposite Al Pacino and Christopher Walken. The following year he appeared in the comedy The Incredible Burt Wonderstone with Steve Carell, Steve Buscemi, Olivia Wilde, and Jim Carrey and Grudge Match with Robert De Niro, Sylvester Stallone, and Kim Basinger. He continued to act in supporting roles in films such as the sports drama Million Dollar Arm (2014) with Jon Hamm and the Christmas comedy Love the Coopers (2015).

From 2015 to 2016, Arkin voiced J. D. Salinger in the Netflix animated series BoJack Horseman. From 2018 to 2019, he starred opposite Michael Douglas in the Netflix series The Kominsky Method for which he received two Primetime Emmy Award for Outstanding Supporting Actor in a Comedy Series nominations, two Golden Globe Award for Best Supporting Actor – Series, Miniseries or Television Film nominations, and several Screen Actors Guild Award nominations.

During this time, Arkin was cast in the comedy Going in Style (2017) with Morgan Freeman and Michael Caine, and Tim Burton's Dumbo (2019).

Arkin gave his final two film-acting roles in 2020 and 2022. He starred alongside Mark Wahlberg and Winston Duke in the 2020 Netflix film Spenser Confidential. His final performance was voicing the character Wild Knuckles in the Universal animated film Minions: The Rise of Gru, which was released to critical and commercial success. In September 2022, Arkin joined Casey Affleck, Kathy Bates, and Teyana Taylor who had been cast in the independent heist thriller The Smack, which was in pre-production prior to his death.

== Musical career ==
With Erik Darling and Bob Carey, he formed the folk group The Tarriers, in which Arkin sang and played guitar. The band members co-composed the group's 1956 hit "The Banana Boat Song", a reworking, with some new lyrics, of a traditional, Jamaican calypso folk song of the same name, combined with another titled "Hill and Gully Rider". It reached No. 4 on the Billboard magazine chart the same year as Harry Belafonte's better-known version. The group appeared in the 1957 Calypso-exploitation film Calypso Heat Wave, singing "Banana Boat Song" and "Choucoune". Arkin was a member of The Tarriers when they recorded "Cindy, Oh Cindy", which also charted.

From 1958 to 1968, Arkin performed and recorded with the children's folk group The Baby Sitters. He also performed the role of Dr. Pangloss in a concert staging of Leonard Bernstein's operetta Candide, alongside Madeline Kahn's Cunegonde. In 1985, he sang two selections by Jones and Schmidt on Ben Bagley's album Contemporary Broadway Revisited.

== Personal life and death ==
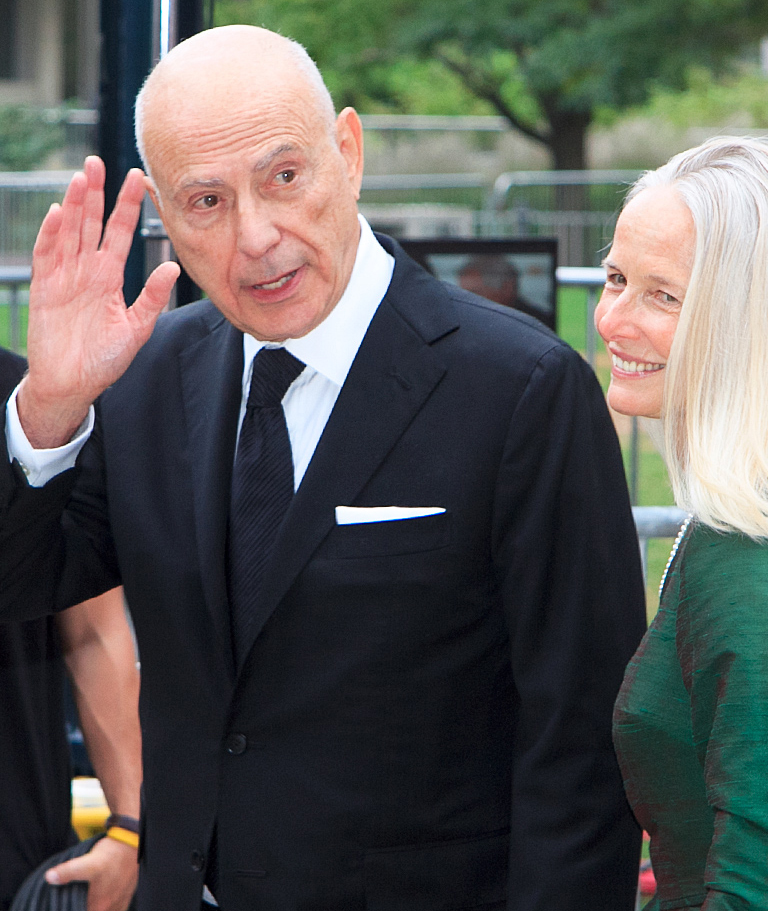
Alan Arkin with his wife Suzanne at the Toronto International Film Festival in September 2012

Arkin was married three times. He and his first wife, Jeremy Yaffe, had two sons: Adam (born August 19, 1956) and Matthew (born March 21, 1960). From 1964 to 1994 he was married to actress-screenwriter Barbara Dana, with whom he appeared in segments of Sesame Street in the 1970s. They lived in Chappaqua, New York and had a son, Anthony, in 1967.

In 1996, two years after his divorce from Dana, Arkin married psychotherapist Dr. Suzanne Newlander. He would later adopt her surname for his character, Norman Newlander, in the Netflix series The Kominsky Method.

Beginning in the late 1990s, he and Suzanne Newlander maintained a seasonal home in Cape Breton Island in the Canadian province of Nova Scotia. Arkin said that he "felt an energy in Cape Breton that [he] never felt anywhere in the world." In 2019, Arkin recorded his vocal performance as Wild Knuckles in Minions: The Rise of Gru in a recording studio in Point Aconi, near his home.

Arkin died at his home in Carlsbad, California, on June 29, 2023, at the age of 89. His death was attributed to heart problems, of which he had a history.

== Selected credits ==
- Enter Laughing (1963, Theatre)
- The Russians Are Coming the Russians Are Coming (1966)
- Wait Until Dark (1967)
- The Heart Is a Lonely Hunter (1968)
- Popi (1969)
- Catch-22 (1970)
- Little Murders (1971)
- Last of the Red Hot Lovers (1972)
- Freebie and the Bean (1974)
- Hearts of the West (1975)
- The Seven-Per-Cent Solution (1976)
- The Defection of Simas Kudirka (1978, TV)
- The Other Side of Hell (1978, TV)
- The In-Laws (1979)
- Improper Channels (1981)
- The Last Unicorn (1982)
- Joshua Then and Now (1985)
- Escape from Sobibor (1987, TV)
- Edward Scissorhands (1990)
- Glengarry Glen Ross (1992)
- Indian Summer (1993)
- Four Days in September (1997)
- Gattaca (1997)
- Grosse Pointe Blank (1997)
- Slums of Beverly Hills (1998)
- Jakob the Liar (1999)
- Thirteen Conversations About One Thing (2001)
- The Pentagon Papers (2003, TV)
- Little Miss Sunshine (2006)
- Marley & Me (2008)
- Sunshine Cleaning (2008)
- City Island (2009)
- Argo (2012)
- Million Dollar Arm (2014)
- Going in Style (2017)
- The Kominsky Method (2018–2019, TV)
- Dumbo (2019)
- Minions: The Rise of Gru (2022)

== Awards and nominations ==
Throughout his career he received an Academy Award, a BAFTA Award, a Golden Globe Award, two Screen Actors Guild Awards, and a Tony Award. He also received six Primetime Emmy Award nominations. In 2014, Arkin received the Gregory Peck Award for Cinematic Excellence to honor his life's work at the San Diego Film Festival.

== Bibliography ==
Arkin was the author of many books. These include:

- Tony's Hard Work Day (illustrated by James Stevenson, 1972)
- The Lemming Condition (illustrated by Joan Sandin, 1976)
- Halfway Through the Door: An Actor's Journey Toward Self (1979)
- The Clearing (1986 continuation of Lemming)
- An Improvised Life (2011) (memoir)
- Out of My Mind (2018) (second memoir)

== See also ==
- List of Russian Americans
- List of oldest and youngest Academy Award winners and nominees
