= Cooperstown (film) =

1993 film directed by Charles Haid

- Written by: Lee Blessing
- Directed by: Charles Haid
- Starring: Alan Arkin; Graham Greene; Maria Pitillo; Charles Haid; Ed Begley Jr. Josh Charles; Paul Dooley
- Composer: Mel Marvin
- Country of origin: United States
- Original language: English

Production
- Producer: Leanne Moore
- Cinematography: William Wages
- Editor: Andrew Doerfer
- Running time: 100 minutes
- Production companies: Amblin Television; Majestic Films International; Turner Pictures

Original release
- Network: TBS
- Release: January 26, 1993

Cooperstown is a 1993 American drama film directed by Charles Haid and written by Lee Blessing. The film stars Alan Arkin, Graham Greene, Maria Pitillo, Charles Haid, Ed Begley Jr., Josh Charles and Paul Dooley. The film premiered on TBS on January 26, 1993.

== Plot ==
In Cooperstown, a baseball pitcher who fell short of achieving his professional dreams is visited by the ghost of his former catcher. The catcher had reached levels of career success that the pitcher had always envied, fueling a sense of jealousy that lasted for years.

With the guidance of his former catcher's ghost, the pitcher embarks on an emotional journey through his past. He revisits key moments and relationships, gaining a new perspective on his life. Through this introspective journey, he overcomes his long-held jealousy and finds a new sense of fulfillment in his current situation.

== Cast ==
- Alan Arkin as Harry Willette
- Graham Greene as Raymond Maracle
- Maria Pitillo as Bridget
- Charles Haid as Little Eddie McVee
- Ed Begley Jr. as Dave Cormeer
- Josh Charles as Jody
- Paul Dooley as Sid Wiggins
- Hope Lange as Cassie Willette
- Ann Wedgeworth as Lila Kunznick
- John Capodice as Morelli
- Joanna Miles as Louise
- Victoria Racimo as Isabel
- Ernie Harwell as Baseball Announcer
- Miles Perlich as Young Eddy
- Byron Thames as Young Harry
- Robbie T. Robinson as Umpire
- Jason Orman as Young Pitcher
- Juarez Orman as Catcher
- Lori Sebourn as Pam
- Zahn McClarnon as Young Raymond
- Jim Elk as Herbert Maracle
- George Cheung as Mr. Matsunaga
