= Hearts of the West =

1975 film by Howard Zieff

- Theatrical release poster
- Directed by: Howard Zieff
- Written by: Rob Thompson
- Produced by: Tony Bill
- Starring: Jeff Bridges; Andy Griffith; Donald Pleasence; Blythe Danner; Alan Arkin
- Cinematography: Mario Tosi
- Edited by: Edward Warschilka
- Music by: Ken Lauber
- Production company: Metro-Goldwyn-Mayer
- Distributed by: United Artists (United States/Canada); Cinema International Corporation (International)
- Release date: October 8, 1975
- Running time: 102 minutes
- Country: United States
- Language: English
- Budget: $2 million
- Box office: $1.6 million

Hearts of the West, released in Europe as Hollywood Cowboy, is a 1975 American comedy film directed by Howard Zieff, released by Metro-Goldwyn-Mayer and starring Jeff Bridges, Andy Griffith, Blythe Danner, and Alan Arkin. A remake of 1932's Make Me a Star, its story revolves around a wannabe Western writer who finds himself cast as a leading man in several 1930s Hollywood B-movie Westerns.

Despite good reviews, the film was a financial disappointment for MGM upon release in 1975, but it has since developed a significant cult following from midnight showings and college campus screenings.

Screenwriter Rob Thompson launched his career with this film. He went on to be a producer on the television series Northern Exposure (for which he won an Emmy.)

== Plot ==
In 1933, Lewis Tater, an aspiring novelist who harbors dreams of becoming the next Zane Grey, decides to leave his family home in Iowa to go to the University of Titan in Nevada so he can soak up the western atmosphere. He arrives to find that there is no university, only a mail order correspondence course scam run by two crooks out of the local hotel. He tries to spend the night at the hotel, but is attacked by one of the men in an attempted robbery. He escapes his attacker, grabs his suitcase, and steals their car to get away, but after a while it runs out of gas. He looks in the car trunk, and finds a toolbox containing a revolver and ammunition. Afraid the two crooks are still in pursuit of him, he takes the tool box and his suitcase and walks off into the desert.

Wandering and exhausted, the next morning he happens upon a threadbare film-unit from Tumbleweed Productions grinding out a "B" western. Later that day, he catches a lift with the cowboy actors to Los Angeles. After applying for work at Tumbleweed, he is referred by crusty old extra Howard Pike to the Rio, a western-themed restaurant. While washing dishes at the Rio, he is called by Tumbleweed, where Howard mentors him to be an actor. After proving himself as a stuntman, unit manager Kessler offers him a speaking role. Tater then falls in love with spunky script girl Miss Trout. Meanwhile, the crooks trace him to Los Angeles to retrieve the safe-box containing their money that was in the car stolen by Lewis.

Following Howard's advice, Lewis plays hardball with the studio while negotiating his first speaking role. He gets fired and falls in with a shady musical producer. Miss Trout chides Lewis for following Howard's advice, since he used to be Billy Pueblo, a major movie star. He squandered his money and was stuck working as an extra.

Howard sells the draft of Lewis' novel as his own work. Completely disillusioned, Lewis is ready to leave town when the crooks track him down and shoot him. Howard bursts in and subdues the men. As Lewis is loaded into an ambulance, Howard admiringly announces Lewis is a writer who has just sold his first book. The film ends with Lewis narrating the scene in his novelistic style.

== Cast ==
- Jeff Bridges as Lewis Tater aka Neddy Wales
- Andy Griffith as Howard Pike aka Billy Pueblo
- Donald Pleasence as A.J. Neitz
- Blythe Danner as Miss Trout
- Alan Arkin as Bert Kessler
- Richard B. Shull as Stout Crook
- Herbert Edelman as Polo
- Alex Rocco as Earl
- Frank Cady as Pa Tater
- Anthony James as Lean Crook
- Burton Gilliam as Lester
- Matt Clark as Jackson
- Candy Azzara as Waitress
- Thayer David as Bank Manager
- Marie Windsor as Hotel Manager
- Anthony Holland as Guest at Beach Party
- Dub Taylor as Ticket Agent
- William Christopher as Bank Teller
- Stuart Nisbet as Lucky
- Tucker Smith as Noodle in Pith Helmet
- Richard Stahl as Barber
- Granville Van Dusen as World War I Pilot

== Reception ==
Roger Ebert called it "a lovely little comedy, a movie to feel fond of" and that Bridges "brings a nice complexity to the role".

On the review aggregator website Rotten Tomatoes, 92% of 12 critics' reviews are positive.

== Awards ==
It was named one of the National Board of Review's Top Ten Films for 1975. Arkin won the New York Film Critics Circle Award for Best Supporting Actor.

== See also ==
- List of American films of 1975
