= The Kominsky Method =

American comedy drama television series (2018–2021)

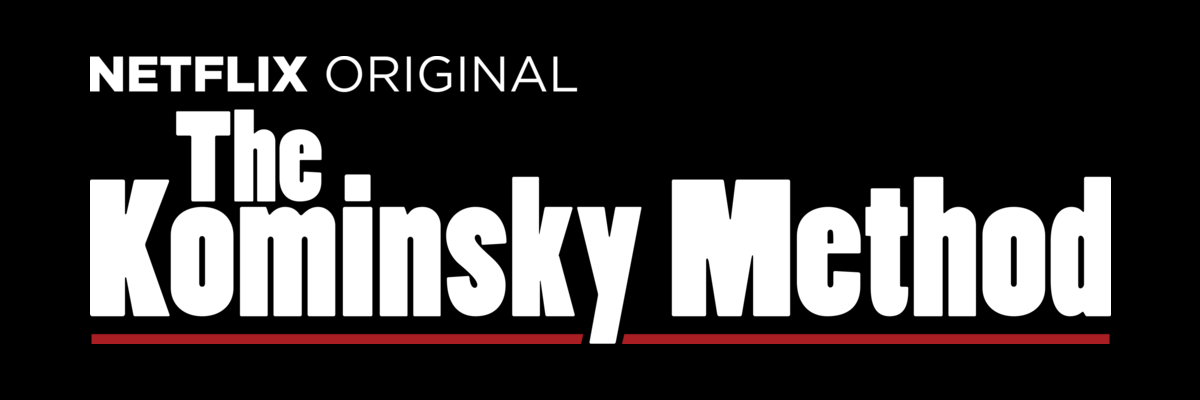
- Genre: Comedy drama
- Created by: Chuck Lorre
- Written by: Chuck Lorre; Al Higgins; David Javerbaum
- Starring: Michael Douglas; Alan Arkin; Sarah Baker; Nancy Travis; Paul Reiser; Kathleen Turner
- Composer: Jeff Cardoni
- Country of origin: United States
- Original language: English
- No. of seasons: 3
- No. of episodes: 22

Production
- Executive producers: Chuck Lorre; Al Higgins; Michael Douglas
- Producer: Marlis Pujol
- Cinematography: Anette Haellmigk
- Editors: Matthew Barbato; Gina Sansom
- Camera setup: Single-camera
- Running time: 22–33 minutes
- Production companies: Chuck Lorre Productions; Warner Bros. Television

Original release
- Network: Netflix
- Release: November 16, 2018 – May 28, 2021

The Kominsky Method is an American comedy-drama television series, created by Chuck Lorre, that premiered on November 16, 2018, on Netflix. It stars Michael Douglas, Alan Arkin, Sarah Baker, Nancy Travis, Paul Reiser and Kathleen Turner and follows an aging acting coach who many years earlier had a brief moment of success as an actor.

A second season premiered on October 25, 2019 and a third and final season, without Arkin, premiered on May 28, 2021.

This was Arkin's final TV project, five years before his death from cardiac arrest on June 29, 2023 at the age of 89.

== Premise ==
The Kominsky Method follows Sandy Kominsky, an actor who years ago had a brief fling with success and is now a Hollywood acting coach.

== Cast and characters ==
=== Main ===
- Michael Douglas as Sandy Kominsky, a once successful actor who now works as an acting coach in Hollywood.
- Alan Arkin as Norman Newlander, Sandy's agent and friend (seasons 1–2) This was Arkin's final television role.
- Sarah Baker as Mindy Volander–Kominsky, Sandy's daughter who runs his acting studio with him.
- Nancy Travis as Lisa, a recent divorcée who decides to take acting lessons from Sandy. (seasons 1–2)
- Paul Reiser as Martin Schneider, Mindy's boyfriend (season 3; recurring season 2)
- Kathleen Turner as Dr. Roz Volander, Sandy's ex-wife (season 3; guest season 2)

=== Recurring ===
==== Students in Kominsky's acting class ====
- Melissa Tang as Margaret
- Jenna Lyng Adams as Darshani
- Graham Rogers as Jude
- Casey Brown as Lane
- Ashleigh LaThrop as Breana
- Emily Osment as Theresa

==== Other ====
- Susan Sullivan as Eileen, Norman's deceased wife, to whom he was married for 46 years (seasons 1–2)
- Lisa Edelstein as Phoebe, Norman's estranged daughter who struggles with a pill addiction
- Ramon Hilario as Alex the Waiter
- Cedric Begley as Mathew, Lisa's son (season 1)
- Anoush NeVart as Rosamie, Norman's housekeeper (season 1)
- Ann-Margret as Diane, Norman's friend (season 1)
- Jane Seymour as Madelyn, a rekindled flame from Norman's past (seasons 2–3)
- Haley Joel Osment as Robby, Phoebe's son (seasons 2–3)

=== Guest ===
- Jay Leno as himself
- Patti LaBelle as herself
- Jason Kravits as Woody Littlehales
- Corbin Bernsen as himself
- George Wyner as Rabbi
- Elizabeth Sung as Mrs. Liu
- Rex Linn as Ed
- Danny DeVito as Dr. Wexler, a urologist
- Elliott Gould as himself
- Lauren Weedman as Director
- Jocelyn Towne as Jeanine
- Azie Tesfai as Lynda
- Eddie Money as himself
- Jen Drohan as Receptionist
- Bob Odenkirk as Dr. Shenckman
- Matt Knudsen as Dad
- Jeffrey D. Sams as Arthur
- Willam Belli as Cherry
- Lainie Kazan as Norman's grandmother
- Allison Janney as herself
- Morgan Freeman as himself
- Barry Levinson as himself
- Jon Cryer as himself
- Christine Ebersole as Estelle

== Episodes ==
Season	Episodes	Originally released
1	8	November 16, 2018
2	8	October 25, 2019
3	6	May 28, 2021

=== Season 1 (2018) ===
No. overall	No. in season	Title	Directed by	Written by	Original release date
1	1	"Chapter 1. An Actor Avoids"	Chuck Lorre	Chuck Lorre	November 16, 2018
Sandy Kominsky and his daughter Mindy run a small actor's studio in Hollywood, where his latest group of students includes Lisa, a middle-aged divorcee whom Sandy later asks out on a date. Sandy meets up with his good friend and agent Norman, who gives Sandy the bad news that CBS has passed him over for Ludacris for a role in a new sitcom. At the urging of Mindy, Sandy pays Norman a visit at his home to see his wife Eileen, who is battling cancer. Sandy and Lisa's date is interrupted by a phone call from Mindy, who tells Sandy that Eileen is back in the hospital. When they get there, they learn that Eileen has died.
2	2	"Chapter 2. An Agent Grieves"	Andy Tennant	Chuck Lorre	November 16, 2018
Sandy brings a grieving Norman home from the hospital. The next morning, Norman sets out to honor Eileen's instructions for her funeral, enlisting Sandy to help. As Sandy tries to arrange to get items such as a driftwood coffin, Lady Marmalade, Jay Leno, and Barbra Streisand, he asks Lisa to be his date at Eileen's funeral, and she accepts. The service sees a late, unexpected guest arriving: Norman and Eileen's prescription drug-addicted daughter, Phoebe.
3	3	"Chapter 3. A Prostate Enlarges"	Donald Petrie	Chuck Lorre & Al Higgins	November 16, 2018
At Eileen's wake, daughter Phoebe continues to embarrass herself. Norman gets an offer of consolation from widow Dianne, and Sandy is noticed to be taking many trips to the bathroom. Sandy addresses the bathroom issue by seeing a urologist, who diagnoses it to be a prostate issue. Phoebe offers to stay with her father for an extended period, but Norman almost immediately realizes the seriousness of his daughter's drug dependency problem. Sandy catches Norman talking to himself, believing that he is speaking with Eileen.
4	4	"Chapter 4. A Kegel Squeaks"	Beth McCarthy-Miller	Chuck Lorre & Al Higgins & David Javerbaum	November 16, 2018
Students Lisa and Lane act out a scene from Cat on a Hot Tin Roof, with Sandy giving a glowing review of Lane's performance. Sandy is anxious to know about his biopsy results. Phoebe's shenanigans drive Norman to take drastic measures. Lane finds out about Sandy seeing a urologist, offering his support. After offending Lisa, Sandy finds himself alone in a bar on a Saturday night. Sandy and Norman try Kegel exercises.
5	5	"Chapter 5. An Agent Crowns"	Beth McCarthy-Miller	Chuck Lorre	November 16, 2018
Sandy is relieved to finally find out his biopsy results, which indicate that he does not need to be treated for cancer. Norman contemplates returning to work at his talent agency, with one of his priorities being to find Sandy some acting work. With Sandy unavailable, Mindy teaches a class to the actor's studio students. Sandy asks Lisa about taking their relationship to the next level. Elliott Gould pitches a new script to Norman. Sandy and Norman find themselves in a hospital waiting room anxious to hear news about Phoebe, who has once again ODed.
6	6	"Chapter 6. A Daughter Detoxes"	Andy Tennant	Chuck Lorre & Al Higgins & David Javerbaum	November 16, 2018
Sandy and Norman take a road trip in order to drop off Phoebe at a drug rehabilitation facility. On the way there and back, they deal with the subjects of back taxes, suicide, the Pechanga Indian Casino, Eddie Money, Thelma & Louise, churros, bonsai plants, and Lisa breaking up with Sandy.
7	7	"Chapter 7. A String Is Attached"	Donald Petrie	Chuck Lorre & Al Higgins & David Javerbaum	November 16, 2018
Sandy's desperation about owing more than $300,000 in back taxes sees him straining his relationships with Norman, Mindy, and Lisa. Norman decides to pay Sandy's IRS bill, but doesn't want Sandy to repay him, which he knows will infuriate Sandy.
8	8	"Chapter 8. A Widow Approaches"	Andy Tennant	Chuck Lorre & Al Higgins & David Javerbaum	November 16, 2018
Norman reveals to Sandy that Dianne wants to meet for a lunch date. After the date, she and Norman attend a fund-raising event for Eileen's Parkinson's Disease charity, inviting Sandy (who then invites Lisa as they have reconciled). Norman starts to fall apart at the event, and his state of mind progressively worsens afterwards. Sandy forces Lisa to decide between attending his acting classes or remaining lovers, and she quickly chooses his acting classes. After Sandy gets a strange collect call from Norman, he seeks out and supports his longtime friend, which includes divulging the secret of the "Kominsky Method" of acting to Norman.

=== Season 2 (2019) ===
No. overall	No. in season	Title	Directed by	Written by	Original release date
9	1	"Chapter 9. An Actor Forgets"	Andy Tennant	Chuck Lorre	October 25, 2019
Sandy visits Norman, only to witness his next phase of grieving over Eileen. As the guys pay their respects at a funeral, Norman meets a woman from his past, Madelyn. At the studio, Mindy tells Sandy a disturbing fact about her latest serious boyfriend while Sandy decides to tell his class the bitter truth about acting as a profession. Norman continues to see Eileen as he starts to date Madelyn. Sandy has an awkward moment with Lisa.
10	2	"Chapter 10. An Old Flame, an Old Wick"	Beth McCarthy-Miller	Chuck Lorre	October 25, 2019
Sandy reaches out to his ex-wife (Kathleen Turner) to discuss Mindy's controversial new boyfriend, Martin. Norman goes horseback riding with Madelyn, which later turns into a stay over at her house. Mindy invites Sandy to dinner so that he can finally meet Martin, but Mindy is irritated by their camaraderie. Norman phones Sandy in the middle of dinner with the jitters of taking the next step with Madelyn.
11	3	"Chapter 11. An Odd Couple Occurs"	Andy Tennant	Chuck Lorre	October 25, 2019
Sandy finally makes a breakthrough with one of his students, Darshani. Mindy is mad at Sandy for getting high with Martin. Norman is overjoyed by how his relationship is progressing with Madelyn, only to find out that Phoebe is coming home. Martin and Sandy deepen their friendship through their common interest. Norman is skeptical about Phoebe being rehabilitated, angering Madelyn. Sandy phones Lisa in a most happy mood.
12	4	"Chapter 12. A Libido Sits in the Fridge"	Beth McCarthy-Miller	Chuck Lorre	October 25, 2019
Sandy and Lisa go out for drinks, where Lisa suggests them having a friendship with no sex. Sandy praises Darshani for her acting breakthrough, but can see through her gratitude. Norman apologises to both Phoebe and Madelyn separately for his recent outburst: Phoebe is receptive while Madelyn becomes distant. Sandy joins Lisa for an evening of movie watching at her place, complete with free-flowing wine and popcorn. As Lisa's inhibitions wear down, Sandy's night features Cialis, the police, and being a supportive friend.
13	5	"Chapter 13. A Shenckman Equivocates"	Andy Tennant	Chuck Lorre	October 25, 2019
Waiter Alex gives Norman his screenplay, wondering if he would be interested in producing it. Sandy brings Martin along for lunch to meet Norman, only to have to deal with a medical emergency. Sandy visits Martin in the hospital to try to cheer him up. After hearing about Martin, Lisa urges Sandy to get a checkup. Sandy goes through a whole barrage of tests, only to have Dr. Shenckman (Bob Odenkirk) give him both good news and bad news. Sandy confides to Norman about his health, and decides that it should be a secret to be kept between them.
14	6	"Chapter 14. A Secret Leaks, a Teacher Speaks"	Beth McCarthy-Miller	Chuck Lorre	October 25, 2019
Norman accompanies Sandy to start his treatments, only for them to be seen by one of Sandy's acting students. Driving home, Norman urges Sandy to tell Mindy about his condition and then receives a call from Madelyn. Madelyn tells more about her life to Norman over dinner, who then decides to come to a compromise with her. About to teach a class, Sandy gets a new student, Martin. Norman takes Madelyn to see Phoebe at work. After seeing a scene from Two and a Half Men acted out by two of his students, Sandy explains comedy to the class, before wrapping it up by having Martin tell his story on stage.
15	7	"Chapter 15. A Hand Job Is Forgiven"	Andy Tennant	Chuck Lorre & Al Higgins	October 25, 2019
Sandy starts his new treatment regimen but something goes terribly wrong. Norman and Phoebe visit Eileen's grave so that Phoebe can make amends. She later extends those amends to her father. A concerned Mindy and Martin visit Sandy to a frightening sight. Sandy helps Margaret act out a scene from Doubt in front of the class. Lisa comes over to Sandy's for dinner but later confronts him for lying.
16	8	"Chapter 16. A Thetan Arrives"	Beth McCarthy-Miller	Chuck Lorre & Al Higgins	October 25, 2019
Norman offers Sandy a place to stay while he recuperates. Phoebe surprises Norman with the arrival of his Scientologist grandson, Robby. Mindy informs Sandy of her plans to change how the acting classes are given. Sandy confronts guest teacher Allison Janney about her approach to teaching acting. Robby introduces the concepts of Scientology to Norman. Sandy gets upsetting news from Lisa. With no support from anyone, Sandy turns up at Norman's, only to find that Robby is in trouble. Note: This episode marks the last appearance of Alan Arkin as Norman Newlander

=== Season 3 (2021) ===
No. overall	No. in season	Title	Directed by	Written by	Original release date
17	1	"Chapter 17. In all the old familiar places"	Chuck Lorre	Chuck Lorre	May 28, 2021
18	2	"Chapter 18. You only give me your funny paper"	Andy Tennant	Chuck Lorre	May 28, 2021
19	3	"Chapter 19. And it's getting more and more absurd"	Andy Tennant	Chuck Lorre	May 28, 2021
20	4	"Chapter 20. The round toes, of the high shoes"	Beth McCarthy-Miller	Chuck Lorre	May 28, 2021
21	5	"Chapter 21. Near, far, wherever you are"	Andy Tennant	Chuck Lorre	May 28, 2021
22	6	"Chapter 22. The fundamental things apply"	Andy Tennant	Chuck Lorre	May 28, 2021

== Production ==
=== Development ===
On August 14, 2017, it was announced that Netflix was finalizing a series order for the production for a first season consisting of ten episodes. The series was set to be written by Chuck Lorre, Al Higgins, and David Javerbaum. Lorre was also set to direct the first episode and executive produce alongside Michael Douglas. Production companies involved with the series were slated to consist of Chuck Lorre Productions and Warner Bros. Television. On July 29, 2018, it was announced during the Television Critics Association's annual summer press tour that the series was to premiere on November 16, 2018. On January 17, 2019, it was announced that the series had been renewed for a second season consisting of eight episodes. The second season was released on October 25, 2019. On July 2, 2020, Netflix renewed the series for a third and final season, which was released on May 28, 2021.

=== Casting ===
Alongside the series order announcement, it was confirmed that Michael Douglas and Alan Arkin had been cast in the lead roles of Sandy Kominsky and Norman Newlander, respectively. In January 2018, it was announced that Nancy Travis and Sarah Baker had been cast in main roles and that Susan Sullivan, Emily Osment, Graham Rogers, Ashleigh LaThrop, Jenna Lyng Adams, Melissa Tang, Casey Brown, and Lisa Edelstein would appear in a recurring capacity.

On February 7, 2019, it was announced that Jane Seymour, Jacqueline Bisset and Paul Reiser had been cast in recurring roles for season two. Bisset was set to play Sandy's ex-wife, but the role was recast with Kathleen Turner, with whom Douglas had previously co-starred in the films Romancing the Stone (1984), The Jewel of the Nile (1985), and The War of the Roses (1989). On September 23, 2020, it was announced that Alan Arkin would not be returning for the show's final season, with Turner's character Dr. Roz Volander instead promoted to a lead role alongside Douglas as Sandy.

== Reception ==
=== Critical response ===
The series received a positive critical reception upon its premiere. On the review aggregation website Rotten Tomatoes, the first season holds an approval rating of 80% with an average score of 6.6/10. The website's critical consensus reads, "Full of humor and heart, The Kominsky Method paints a surprisingly poignant – if a little paint-by-numbers – portrait of life and aging, elevated by two top-notch performances by acting legends Alan Arkin and Michael Douglas." Metacritic, which uses a weighted average, assigned the first season a score of 68 out of 100 based on 19 critics, indicating "generally favorable reviews".

=== Awards and nominations ===
Year	Award	Category	Nominee(s)	Result	Ref.
2018	American Film Institute Awards	Top 10 TV Programs of the Year	The Kominsky Method	Won	
2019	Critics' Choice Television Awards	Best Comedy Series	The Kominsky Method	Nominated	
2019	Critics' Choice Television Awards	Best Actor in a Comedy Series	Michael Douglas	Nominated	
2019	Golden Globe Awards	Best Television Series – Musical or Comedy	The Kominsky Method	Won	
2019	Golden Globe Awards	Best Actor – Television Series Musical or Comedy	Michael Douglas	Won	
2019	Golden Globe Awards	Best Supporting Actor – Series, Miniseries or Television Film	Alan Arkin	Nominated	
2019	Primetime Emmy Awards	Outstanding Lead Actor in a Comedy Series	Michael Douglas (for "Chapter One: An Actor Avoids")	Nominated	
2019	Primetime Emmy Awards	Outstanding Supporting Actor in a Comedy Series	Alan Arkin (for "Chapter Two: An Agent Grieves")	Nominated	
2019	Primetime Creative Arts Emmy Awards	Outstanding Sound Mixing for a Comedy or Drama Series (Half-Hour) and Animation	Yuri Reese, Bill Smith and Michael Hoffman (for "Chapter 1: An Actor Avoids")	Nominated	
2019	Satellite Awards	Best Musical or Comedy Series	The Kominsky Method	Nominated	
2019	Satellite Awards	Best Actor in a Musical or Comedy Series	Michael Douglas	Nominated	
2019	Satellite Awards	Best Supporting Actor in a Series, Miniseries or TV Film	Alan Arkin	Nominated	
2019	Screen Actors Guild Awards	Outstanding Performance by an Ensemble in a Comedy Series	Jenna Lyng Adams, Alan Arkin, Sarah Baker, Casey Thomas Brown, Michael Douglas, Ashleigh LaThrop, Emily Osment, Graham Rogers, Susan Sullivan, Melissa Tang & Nancy Travis	Nominated	
2019	Screen Actors Guild Awards	Outstanding Performance by a Male Actor in a Comedy Series	Alan Arkin	Nominated	
2019	Screen Actors Guild Awards	Outstanding Performance by a Male Actor in a Comedy Series	Michael Douglas	Nominated	
2020	Golden Globe Awards	Best Television Series – Musical or Comedy	The Kominsky Method	Nominated	
2020	Golden Globe Awards	Best Actor – Television Series Musical or Comedy	Michael Douglas	Nominated	
2020	Golden Globe Awards	Best Supporting Actor – Series, Miniseries or Television Film	Alan Arkin	Nominated	
2020	Screen Actors Guild Awards	Outstanding Performance by an Ensemble in a Comedy Series	Jenna Lyng Adams, Alan Arkin, Sarah Baker, Casey Thomas Brown, Michael Douglas, Lisa Edelstein, Paul Reiser, Graham Rogers, Jane Seymour, Melissa Tang & Nancy Travis	Nominated	
2020	Screen Actors Guild Awards	Outstanding Performance by a Male Actor in a Comedy Series	Alan Arkin	Nominated	
2020	Screen Actors Guild Awards	Outstanding Performance by a Male Actor in a Comedy Series	Michael Douglas	Nominated	
2020	Casting Society of America	Television Pilot & First Season – Comedy	Nikki Valko, Ken Miller & Tara Treacy	Nominated	
2020	Primetime Emmy Awards	Outstanding Comedy Series	Chuck Lorre, Al Higgins, Michael Douglas, Andy Tennant, Beth McCarthy-Miller & Marlis Pujol	Nominated	
2020	Primetime Emmy Awards	Outstanding Lead Actor in a Comedy Series	Michael Douglas (for "Chapter 12: A Libido Sits in the Fridge")	Nominated	
2020	Primetime Emmy Awards	Outstanding Supporting Actor in a Comedy Series	Alan Arkin (for "Chapter 14: A Secret Leaks, a Teacher Speaks")	Nominated	
2021	Hollywood Critics Association TV Awards	Best Actor in a Streaming Series, Comedy	Michael Douglas	Nominated	
2021	Hollywood Critics Association TV Awards	Best Supporting Actress in a Streaming Series, Comedy	Kathleen Turner	Nominated	
2021	Primetime Emmy Awards	Outstanding Comedy Series	Chuck Lorre, Al Higgins, Michael Douglas, Andy Tennant, Beth McCarthy Miller & Marlis Pujol	Nominated	
2021	Primetime Emmy Awards	Outstanding Lead Actor in a Comedy Series	Michael Douglas (for "Chapter 20. The Round Toes, Of The High Shoes")	Nominated	
2021	Primetime Emmy Awards	Outstanding Supporting Actor in a Comedy Series	Paul Reiser (for "Chapter 18. You Only Give Me Your Funny Paper")	Nominated	
2021	Primetime Creative Arts Emmy Awards	Outstanding Guest Actor in a Comedy Series	Morgan Freeman (for "Chapter 20. The Round Toes, Of The High Shoes")	Nominated	
2021	Primetime Creative Arts Emmy Awards	Outstanding Casting for a Comedy Series	Nikki Valko, Ken Miller & Tara Treacy	Nominated	
2021	Primetime Creative Arts Emmy Awards	Outstanding Sound Mixing for a Comedy or Drama Series (Half-Hour) and Animation	Yuri Reese, Sean Madsen & Brian Wittle (for "Chapter 21. Near, Far, Wherever You Are")	Nominated	
2022	Screen Actors Guild Awards	Outstanding Performance by an Ensemble in a Comedy Series	Jenna Lyng Adams, Sarah Baker, Casey Thomas Brown, Michael Douglas, Lisa Edelstein, Ashleigh LaThrop, Emily Osment, Haley Joel Osment, Paul Reiser, Graham Rogers, Melissa Tang, and Kathleen Turner	Nominated	
2022	Screen Actors Guild Awards	Outstanding Performance by a Male Actor in a Comedy Series	Michael Douglas	Nominated	

== Home media ==
The first season was released to general retailers on November 19, 2019 in Region 1, with a Blu-ray version made available exclusively through the Warner Archive Collection.

== See also ==
- Stanislavski's system – a real system of training actors
