= Calypso Heat Wave =

1957 film by Fred F. Sears

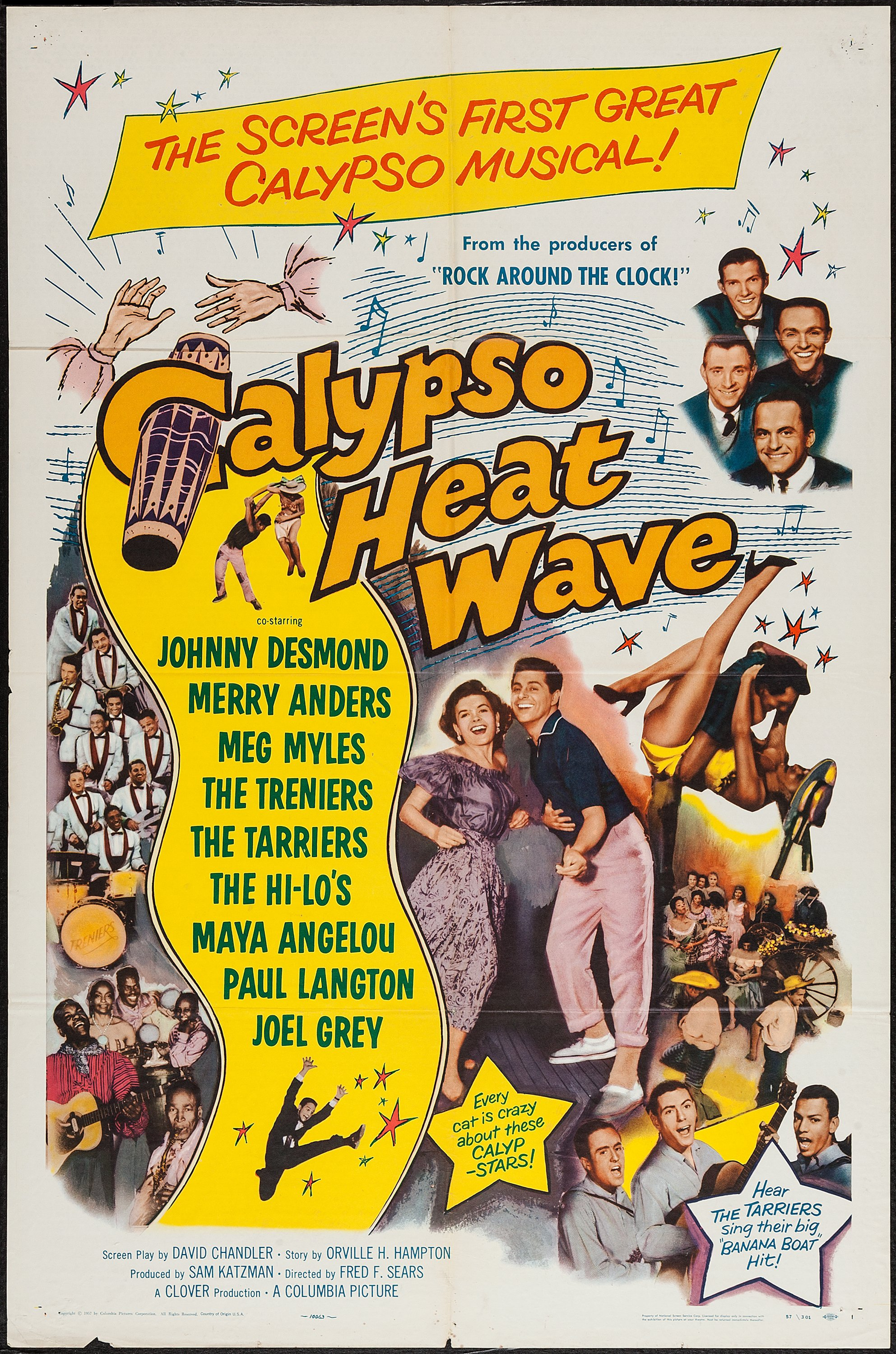
- Original Calypso Heat Wave Poster
- Directed by: Fred F. Sears
- Screenplay by: David Chandler
- Story by: Orville H. Hampton
- Produced by: Sam Katzman
- Starring: Johnny Desmond; Merry Anders; Meg Myles
- Cinematography: Benjamin H. Kline
- Edited by: Edwin H. Bryant; Anthony DiMarco
- Color process: Black and white
- Production company: Clover Productions
- Distributed by: Columbia Pictures
- Release date: June 1957
- Running time: 86 minutes
- Country: United States
- Language: English

Calypso Heat Wave is a 1957 American drama musical film directed by Fred F. Sears and starring Johnny Desmond, Merry Anders and Meg Myles.

It was an attempt by producer Sam Katzman to repeat the success of Rock Around the Clock with calypso music. It was originally known as Juke Box Jamboree.

== Plot ==
Everything's going well at Disco Records, where singer Johnny Conroy is popular and publicity chief Marty Collins is good at her job, as well as in love with company boss Mack Adams.

Everything changes when Barney Pearl shows up. Pearl is a crude businessman who supplies records to jukeboxes coast-to-coast. He demands to be made a full partner in Disco Records or he will yank their discs out of jukes everywhere. Furthermore, he insists that singer girlfriend Mona De Luce gets to make a record of her own.

Implored not to agree, Mack goes along. Pearl keeps the pressure on, renaming the company after himself. Johnny quits and leaves on his sailboat for points unknown. Mona, meanwhile, is a much better singer than expected. Her record is a smash hit, annoying Barney, who wants her wholly dependent on him. Barney demands her career come to an end.

Marty, Mack and Mona all travel to the West Indies, where Johnny is now enjoying the sun, fun and music. Johnny suggests they begin recording calypso songs. It all works out perfectly, and when Pearl tries to cut himself in, they find a way to keep him out.

== Cast ==
- Johnny Desmond as Johnny Conroy
- Merry Anders as Marty Collins
- Meg Myles as Mona De Luce
- Paul Langton as Mack Adams
- Joel Grey as Alex Nash
- Michael Granger as Barney Pearl
- George E. Stone as Books
- The Treniers as The Treniers
- The Tarriers as The Tarriers
- The Hi-Los as The Hi-Los
- Maya Angelou as herself
- Dick Whittinghill as himself
- Darla Hood as Johnny's Duet Partner
- Pierce Lyden as Hi-Fi
- Gil Perkins as First Thug
- William Challee as Second Thug
- King Charles MacNiles as Mac Niles (as Mac Niles)
