= The Pentagon Papers (film) =

- Genre: Historical drama
- Written by: Jason Horwitch
- Directed by: Rod Holcomb
- Starring: James Spader; Paul Giamatti; Claire Forlani; Alan Arkin
- Music by: Normand Corbeil
- Country of origin: United States
- Original language: English

Production
- Executive producer: Joshua D. Maurer
- Producer: Stephen J. Turnbull
- Cinematography: Michael Mayers
- Editor: Christopher Nelson
- Running time: 92 minutes
- Production companies: City Entertainment; FX Networks; Paramount Television

Original release
- Network: FX
- Release: March 9, 2003

The Pentagon Papers is a 2003 American historical drama television film about Daniel Ellsberg and the events leading up to the publication of the Pentagon Papers in 1971. The film documents Ellsberg's life starting with his work for RAND Corporation and ending with the day on which the judge declared a mistrial in Ellsberg's espionage case. The film was directed by Rod Holcomb, written by Jason Horwitch, and stars James Spader as Ellsberg. The cast also includes Claire Forlani, Alan Arkin, and Paul Giamatti. The film aired on FX on March 9, 2003.

== Cast ==
- James Spader as Daniel Ellsberg
- Claire Forlani as Patricia Marx
- Paul Giamatti as Anthony Russo
- Alan Arkin as Harry Rowen
- Kenneth Welsh as John McNaughton
- Maria del Mar as Carol Ellsberg
- Sean McCann as John Mitchell
- Jim Downing as H.R. Haldeman
- Richard Fitzpatrick as John Ehrlichman
- Jonas Chernick as Neil Sheehan
- Amy Price-Francis as Jan Butler
- Aaron Ashmore as Randy Kehler
- Damir Andrei as Leonard Boodin
- Carl Marotte as Charles Nesson
- David Fox as Rechter W. Matthew Bryne
- Martin Roach as Sgt. Watson
- Sharon McFarlane as Charlotte
- Owen Rilan as Cororra
- George R. Robertson as Senator Fulbright
- Robert Seeliger as FBI Agent
- Roland Rothchild as FBI Agent
- Neville Edwards as Bailif
- Matt Cooke as Rand Employee
- Jonathan Higgins as Army Officer at Rand
- Daneen Boone as Blonde at Russo's
- Judah Katz as District Attorney
- Bruce Gooch as Supreme Court Marshal
- Mark Benesh as Leonard Compson III
- Troy Blendell as Marine Radio Man
- Amy Troung as Vietnamese Woman
- Kris Saric as Marine Captain in Bar
- Derek Murchie as Air Force Officer in Bar

== Production ==
The film was shot in Toronto. Filming locations included Old City Hall, Osgoode Hall, the Distillery District, the Mowat Block, and University College.

== See also ==
- The Most Dangerous Man in America: Daniel Ellsberg and the Pentagon Papers (2009 Oscar-nominated feature documentary)
- The Post (2017 film)
