= Simon (1980 film) =

1980 film by Marshall Brickman

- Theatrical release poster
- Directed by: Marshall Brickman
- Screenplay by: Marshall Brickman
- Story by: Marshall Brickman; Thomas Baum
- Produced by: Martin Bregman
- Starring: Alan Arkin; Madeline Kahn; Austin Pendleton; Judy Graubart; William Finley; Wallace Shawn; Jayant; Max Wright
- Cinematography: Adam Holender
- Edited by: Nina Feinberg
- Music by: Stanley Silverman
- Production company: Orion Pictures
- Distributed by: Warner Bros.
- Release date: February 1980
- Running time: 97 minutes
- Country: United States
- Language: English
- Box office: $6 million

Simon is a 1980 American comedy film written and directed by Marshall Brickman and starring Alan Arkin. The plot concerns a university professor manipulated into thinking he is an alien from space by a think tank, whose members scheme to use him to create a media circus.

== Plot ==
The Institute for Advanced Concepts is a think tank composed of five scientists with an unlimited budget and a propensity for fabricating national hysterias. The five hatch a plan to trick a man into thinking he is of extraterrestrial origin through brainwashing and, using their talking computer "Doris" to conduct a national search, settle on a psychology professor named Simon Mendelssohn, who was abandoned at birth and is trying to perform an experiment with an isolation tank. At the institute, Simon is submerged in an isolation tank of their own and, after an extended time, emerges in a weakened mental state that causes him to reenact the entire history of evolution of life on Earth from a single-celled organism to a modern man. While Simon is in this state, the scientists plant a hypnotic suggestion that his mother is an alien spaceship and that he was made as a machine rather than being born naturally. The five then put their plan to create a mass hysteria into action by broadcasting Simon's ramblings, which include a number of proposals to reform American culture. When they decide Simon has become too dangerous as a result of his newfound celebrity status, they call in the military to kill him, but his girlfriend Lisa comes to his rescue.

As the couple goes on the run, Lisa tries to remind Simon that he is an ordinary human. Along the way, they encounter a commune that worships a television, which they call the "magic box", and have no concept of disliking anything they watch. The founder of the commune used to work for the American Broadcasting Company and so has a truck with a high-powered TV transmitter. The military soon locates the origins of Simon's hijacked TV signals, forcing the couple to flee once again. In doing so, Lisa finally convinces Simon that he is human when she tells him she is pregnant with his child.

Dr. Becker, head of the institute, blames the release of a gas that takes a hundred points off the IQs of the other scientists on Simon. As the four are acting childish, Becker and the military commander arrange a rocket launch to get rid of Simon, supposedly by sending him home to his planet but really by just launching him into space without a destination. Simon calls and turns himself in, and Becker, thinking he is fooled, accompanies him to the rocket. Simon overpowers Becker, straps him into the rocket seat, and escapes in a NASA uniform as Becker is launched into space.

Simon and Lisa are last seen having settled down in Canada with their child, where they plan to live in peace and obscurity despite the American military and media continuing to search for Simon. A radio broadcast informs Lisa that Simon has just won the Nobel Peace Prize for his suggestions in his broadcasts to improve American life, such as prohibiting anyone from replacing towels with blow-drying machines in public restrooms.

== Cast ==
- Alan Arkin as Simon Mendelssohn
- Austin Pendleton as Becker
- Judy Graubart as Lisa
- William Finley as Fichandler
- Wallace Shawn as Van Dongen
- Jayant as Barundi
- Keith Szarabajka as Josh
- Max Wright as Hundertwasser
- Madeline Kahn as Cynthia
- Louise Lasser (uncredited) as voice of Doris

In addition, Fred Gwynne plays Korey, while David Susskind and Dick Cavett both appear in cameos as themselves.

== Reception ==
Simon received mixed reviews from critics. On Rotten Tomatoes, the film holds a rating of 60% from 20 reviews.

Gene Siskel of the Chicago Tribune gave the film 2 out of 4 stars, saying that the film is "neither a funny nor insightful film. In fact, 'Simon' is a scattershot mess." Both he and Roger Ebert of the Chicago Sun-Times gave the film two "no" votes on their show Sneak Previews. Nathan Rabin, in a 2012 review for The A.V. Club, rated Simon a B−, stating that the film "is riddled with moments of genius, yet shows only an intermittent interest in harnessing all that brainy inspiration into a satisfying narrative... [i]t's too scattered".

=== Awards ===
At the 8th Saturn Awards, Alan Arkin was nominated for the Saturn Award for Best Actor.

== Home video availability ==
In 1981 and 1990, the film was released on VHS format by Warner Home Video and is now out of print. A remastered copy of the film was released via Warner Archives' Made To Order DVD-R service in 2011 in its original widescreen 16×9 (1.85:1) format.
