= The Heart Is a Lonely Hunter (film) =

1968 film

- Theatrical release poster
- Directed by: Robert Ellis Miller
- Screenplay by: Thomas C. Ryan
- Based on: The Heart Is a Lonely Hunter; 1940 novel by Carson McCullers
- Produced by: Thomas C. Ryan; Marc Merson
- Starring: Alan Arkin; Laurinda Barrett; Stacy Keach, Jr. Chuck McCann; Biff McGuire; Percy Rodriguez; Cicely Tyson; Sondra Locke
- Cinematography: James Wong Howe
- Edited by: John F. Burnett
- Music by: Dave Grusin
- Distributed by: Warner Bros.-Seven Arts
- Release date: July 31, 1968
- Running time: 123 minutes
- Country: United States
- Language: English
- Box office: $1.1 million (US/ Canada)

The Heart Is a Lonely Hunter is a 1968 American Southern Gothic drama film adaptation of the 1940 novel of the same name by Carson McCullers. It was directed by Robert Ellis Miller. It stars Alan Arkin and Sondra Locke (in her film debut, age 24), who both earned Academy Award nominations for their performances. The film is recognized by the American Film Institute in AFI's 100 Years of Film Scores – Nominated.

== Plot ==
John Singer is a deaf-mute who works as a silver engraver in a southern U.S. town. His only friend is a mentally disabled mute, Spiros Antonapoulos, who continually gets into trouble with the law, since he does not know any better. When Spiros is committed to a mental institution by his cousin, who is his guardian, John offers to become Spiros' guardian, but he is told that Spiros will have to go to the institution until this has been arranged. John decides to move to a town near the institution in order to be near his friend. He finds work there and rents a room in the home of Mr. and Mrs. Kelly, who are having financial difficulties as a result of Mr. Kelly's recent hip injury.

Because the Kellys' teenage daughter, Margaret ('Mick'), resents having to give up her room to him, John tries to win her friendship. He also tries to become friends with Jake Blount, a semi-alcoholic drifter, and Dr. Copeland, an embittered African-American physician who is secretly dying of lung cancer. John helps interpret for a deaf-mute patient who is seeing Dr. Copeland. Copeland's deepest disappointment is that his educated daughter, Portia, works as a domestic and is married to a field hand. Meanwhile, Mick has an outdoor teenage party at her house, but is disgusted after some boy guests disrupt it by fighting and setting off fireworks.

Following a successful attempt to win Mick's friendship by encouraging her love for classical music, John visits Spiros and, although he takes him out for the day, John is lonelier than ever when he returns home. Meanwhile, Portia and her husband are attacked and he is jailed for defending himself at an incident at a carnival. Portia gets upset at Dr. Copeland for not perjuring himself to help bring out the truth about what happened in the fight. Dr. Copeland and Portia's relationship gets even more strained after her husband has his leg amputated after being placed in irons for trying to escape jail.

John gets them to reconcile after he tells Portia of Dr. Copeland's illness. Mick willfully loses her virginity to the sensitive older brother of one of her classmates after she realizes that her father's injury has permanently disabled him and she will have to leave school and work to help support the family. Disturbed by her sexual initiation, she ignores John's request for some company. John goes to visit Spiros and learns that he has been dead for several weeks. After visiting his friend's grave, pacing and apologizing over and over in sign language, John returns to his room and commits suicide.

Some months afterwards, Mick brings flowers to John's grave and meets Dr. Copeland. As they talk, Mick asks the question, "Why did he do it?" Dr. Copeland leaves, and the film ends with Mick admitting out loud to John's open grave that she loved him.

== Cast ==
- Alan Arkin as John Singer
- Sondra Locke as Margaret 'Mick' Kelly
- Laurinda Barrett as Mrs. Kelly
- Stacy Keach (as Stacy Keach, Jr.) as Jake Blount
- Chuck McCann as Spiros Antonapoulos
- Biff McGuire as Mr. Kelly
- Percy Rodriguez as Dr. Benedict Mady Copeland
- Cicely Tyson as Portia Copeland
- Jackie Marlowe as Bubber Kelly
- Johnny Popwell as Willie
- Wayne Smith as Harry Minowitz
- Gonzalo Meroño as Richard Steward
- Peter Mamakos as Spirmonedes
- John O'Leary as Beaudine
- Hubert Harper as Biff Brannon
- Sherri Vise as Delores
- Anna Lee Carroll as Nurse Bradford

== Production ==
Alan Arkin was the first actor chosen for the film.

Sondra Locke, then known as Sandra Locke, was a 23-year-old WSM-TV (Nashville, Tennessee) staff employee when she auditioned for the role of Mick on July 28, 1967. To seem younger, Locke shaved six years off her age—a lie she maintained for the rest of her career. Although she was soon outed by The Billings Gazette and The Tennessean, it took decades for syndicated outlets to catch on. The actress' death in 2018 would go unannounced and be kept secret for six weeks before the news surfaced with minimal coverage; scholars concluded that, since Locke had spent a lifetime lying about her age, she must have requested the blackout in her final wishes so as to prevent her true age from being broadcast to the world. Bonnie Bedelia, four years Locke's junior, told the Los Angeles Times that "they decided I was too old" to play Mick.

To mask the obviousness of Locke's age discrepancy, press releases containing a biographical sketch of the 1944-born actress omitted her time at Middle Tennessee State University (MTSU) as well as her residence in Nashville, where she had moved in 1963 after dropping out of college. Locke did eventually admit to lying about her age in her 1997 memoir, The Good, the Bad & the Very Ugly, but claimed to have knocked only three years off, rather than six. In her final interview, conducted in 2015 for a podcast called The Projection Booth, Locke lied that she "was just graduating high school" when she started work on the film. By the time awards season rolled around, she was, in fact, about to turn 25, making her the oldest nominee in the New Star of the Year – Actress category at the 26th Golden Globe Awards.

Locke's salary was reported as $15,000 in contemporary articles in the movie press, but she later claimed it had been less than one-third that amount.

For the role of Mick's love interest Harry, director Robert Ellis Miller cast Wayne Smith, five years younger than Locke, even though the character is described in the screenplay as being older than Mick.

Percy Rodriguez, who played Cicely Tyson's father, was only six years older than Tyson. Although Laurinda Barrett played Locke's mother, she was only 12½ years older than Locke.

Principal photography began on September 18, 1967, in Selma, Alabama, and lasted for six to eight weeks. Locke married Gordon Anderson during the second week of the shoot. She falsely stated in an on-set interview that he was two years her senior; this subterfuge would be disseminated in reference sources. In fact, Locke's husband was three months younger than her.

== Reception ==
Film critic Derek Winnert awarded the movie four stars, and Renata Adler of The New York Times praised the cast, especially Alan Arkin as Singer, whose performance she described as "extraordinary, deep and sound."

Stanley Kauffmann of The New Republic described the movie as "pedestrian and distorted".

Gregg J. Kilday of The Harvard Crimson criticized how some characters are "cardboard remains" of novel versions; he wrote that Spiros "is grossly overplayed", Blount "has been reduced to a drunken bum (someone was afraid to dirty their camera in politics)" and that Dr. Copeland and Portia's relationship "plays like a Black Power version of The Secret Storm."

== Awards and nominations ==
Award	Category	Nominee(s)	Result	Ref.
Academy Awards	Best Actor	Alan Arkin	Nominated	
Academy Awards	Best Supporting Actress	Sondra Locke	Nominated	
Golden Globe Awards	Best Motion Picture – Drama		Nominated	
Golden Globe Awards	Best Actor in a Motion Picture – Drama	Alan Arkin	Nominated	
Golden Globe Awards	Best Supporting Actress – Motion Picture	Sondra Locke	Nominated	
Golden Globe Awards	Most Promising Newcomer – Female	Sondra Locke	Nominated	
Kansas City Film Critics Circle Awards	Best Actor	Alan Arkin	Won	
Laurel Awards	Top Male Dramatic Performance	Alan Arkin	Nominated	
Laurel Awards	Top Female Supporting Performance	Sondra Locke	2nd Place	
Laurel Awards	Top Female New Face	Sondra Locke	8th Place	
Laurel Awards	Top Cinematographer	James Wong Howe	Won	
National Society of Film Critics Awards	Best Actor	Alan Arkin	Nominated	
New York Film Critics Circle Awards	Best Actor	Alan Arkin	Won	
Writers Guild of America Awards	Best Written American Drama	Thomas C. Ryan	Nominated	

== See also ==
- List of films featuring the deaf and hard of hearing
