= 10th Satellite Awards =

Awards ceremony for film and television

- Date: December 17, 2005

Highlights
- Best drama film: Brokeback Mountain
- Best comedy/musical film: Walk the Line
- Best television drama: House, M.D.
- Best television musical/comedy: The Daily Show with Jon Stewart
- Best director: Ang Lee for Brokeback Mountain

The 10th Satellite Awards, honoring the best in film and television of 2005, were given on December 17, 2005.

== Special achievement awards ==
Auteur Award (for his work on the film Good Night, and Good Luck and his promising filmmaking future) – George Clooney

Mary Pickford Award (for outstanding contribution to the entertainment industry) – Gena Rowlands

Nikola Tesla Award (for his special effects contributions to cinema) – Stan Winston

Outstanding New Talent – Rupert Friend

== Motion picture winners and nominees ==
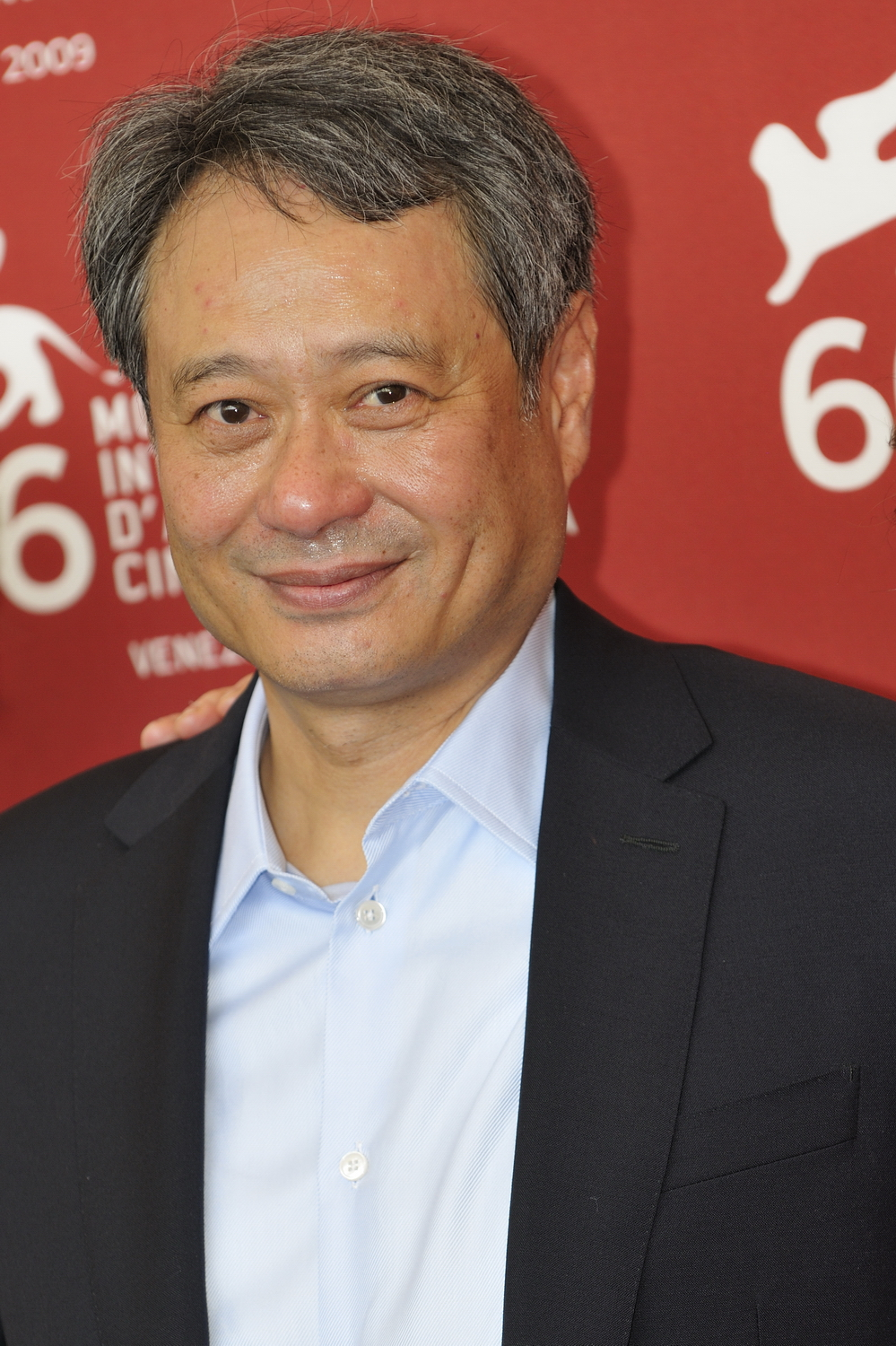
Ang Lee, Best Director winner

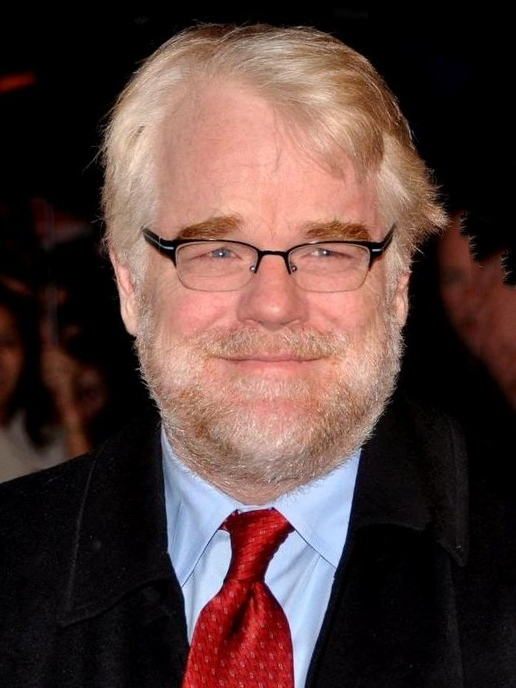
Philip Seymour Hoffman, Best Actor in a Motion Picture – Drama winner

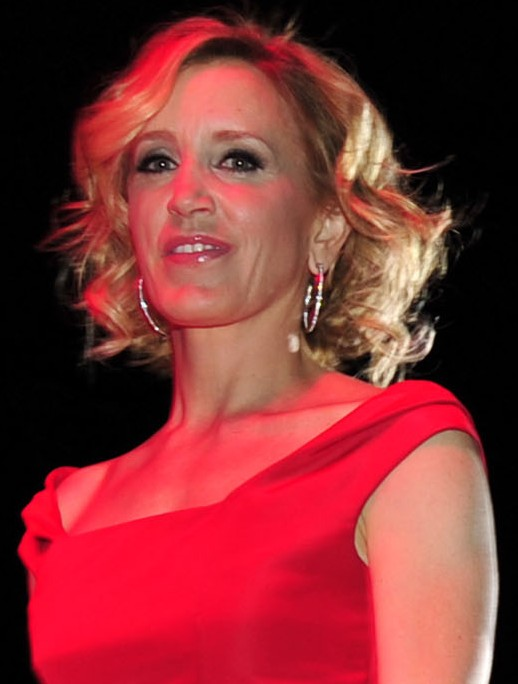
Felicity Huffman, Best Actress in a Motion Picture – Drama winner & Best Actress in a Comedy or Musical Series co-winner

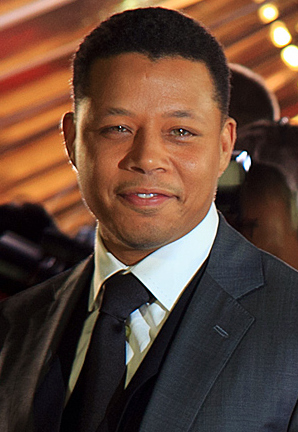
Terrence Howard, Best Actor in a Motion Picture – Comedy or Musical winner

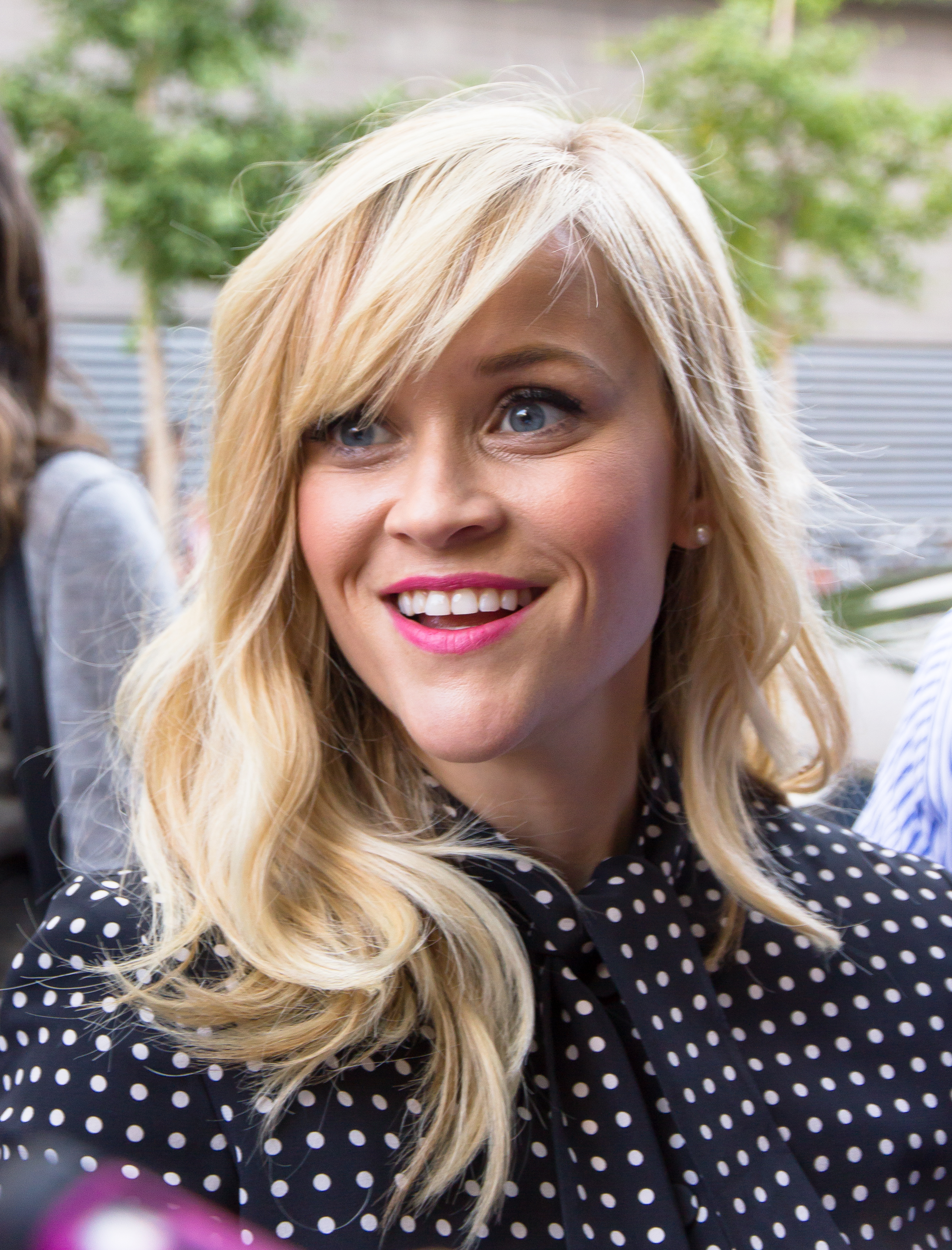
Reese Witherspoon, Best Actress in a Motion Picture – Comedy or Musical winner

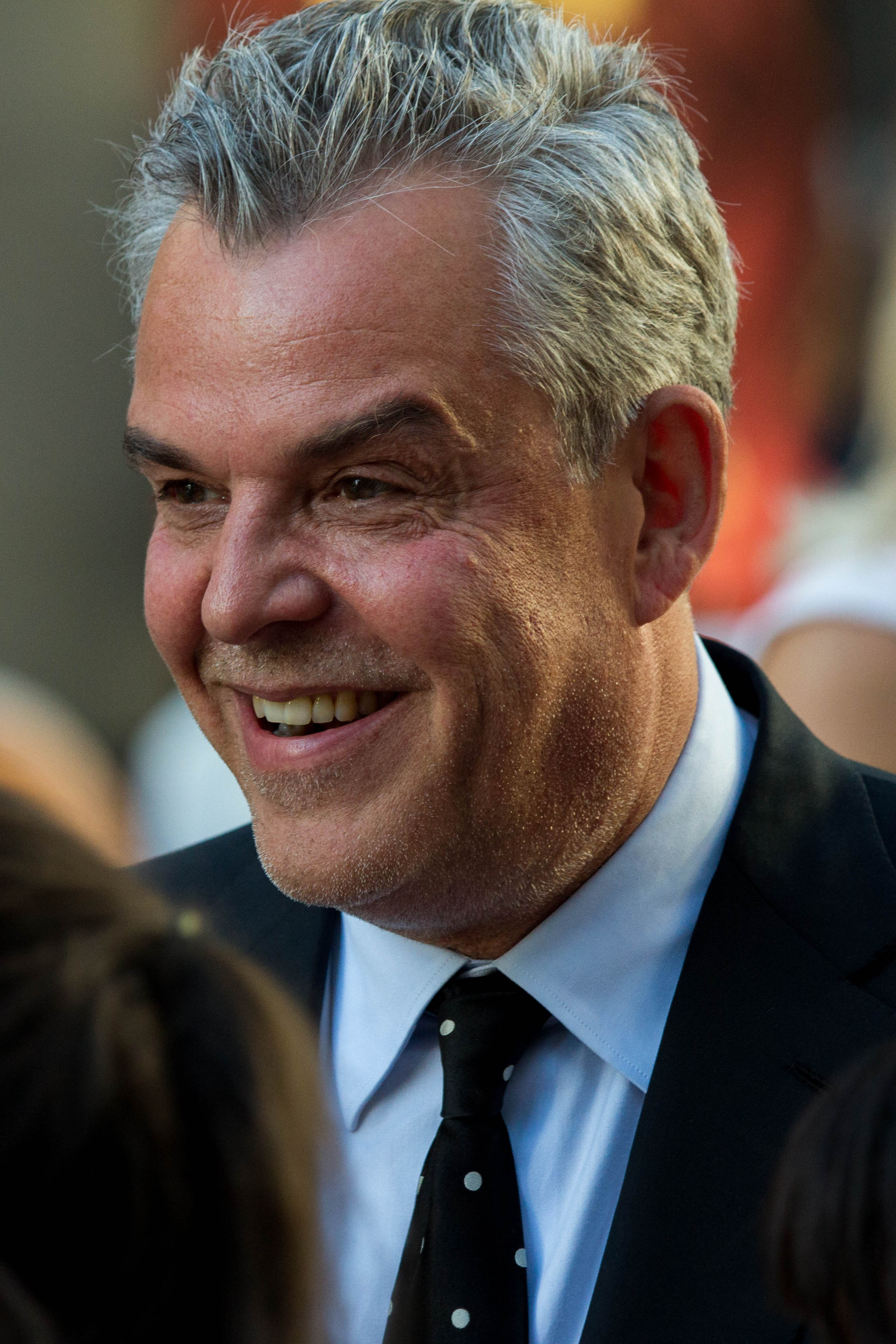
Danny Huston, Best Supporting Actor in a Motion Picture – Drama winner

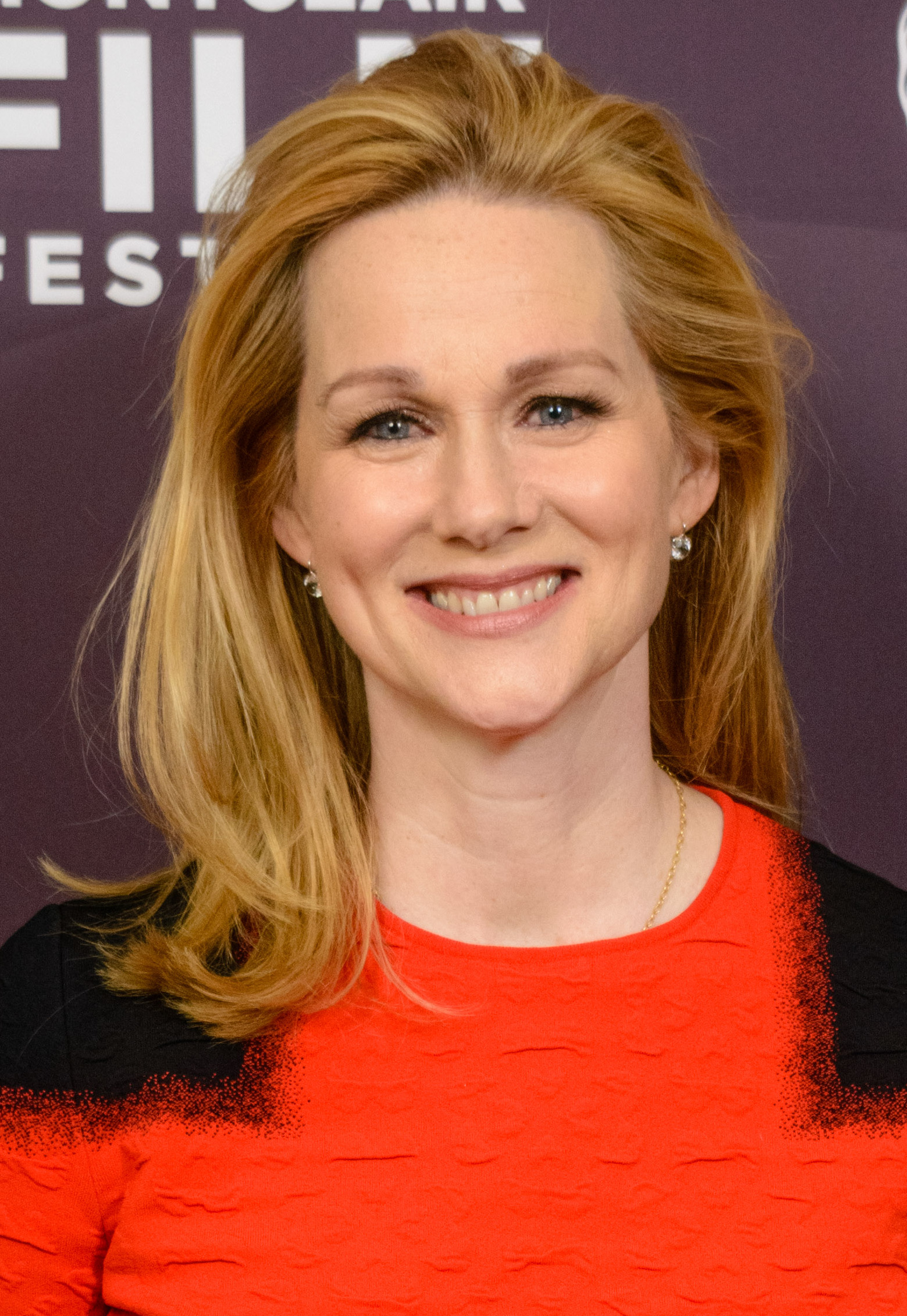
Laura Linney, Best Supporting Actress in a Motion Picture – Drama winner

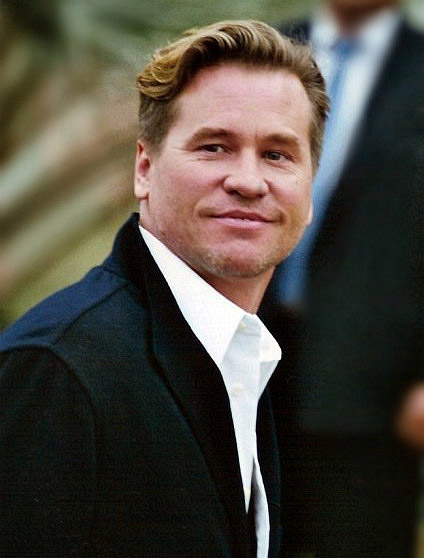
Val Kilmer, Best Supporting Actor in a Motion Picture – Comedy or Musical winner

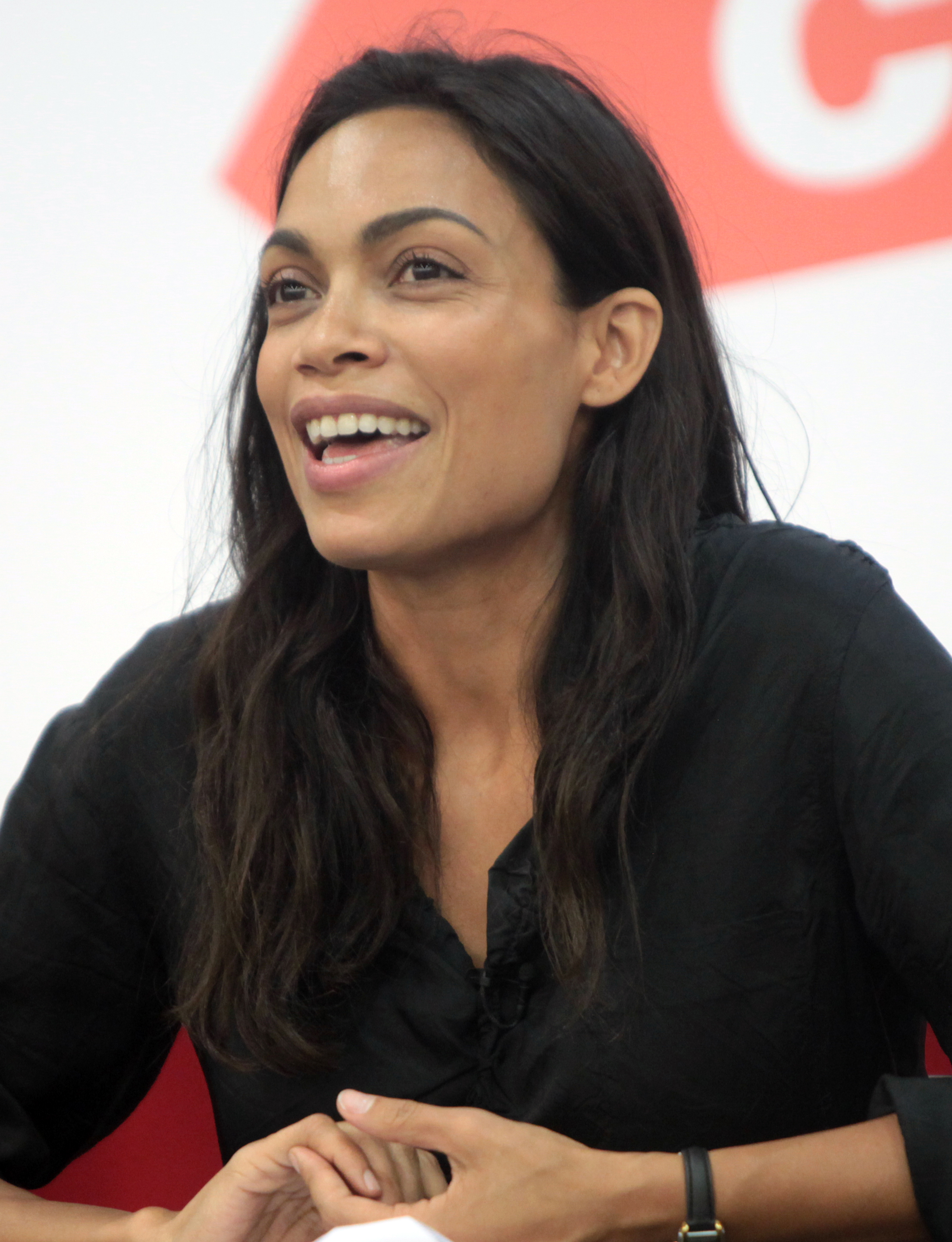
Rosario Dawson, Best Supporting Actress in a Motion Picture – Comedy or Musical winner

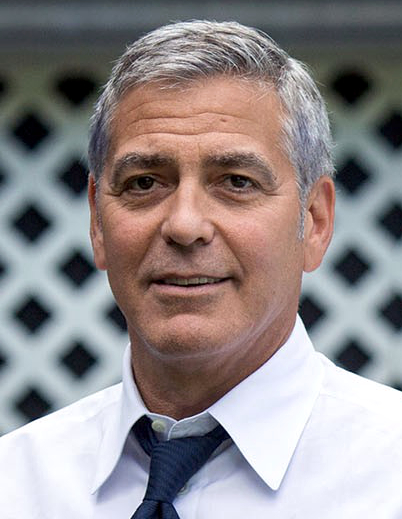
George Clooney, Best Original Screenplay co-winner

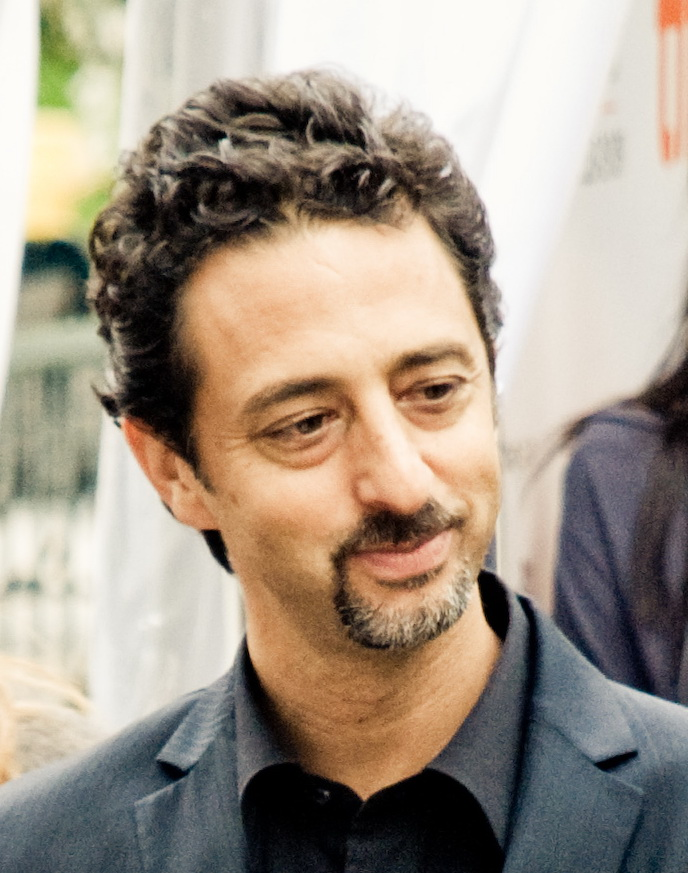
Grant Heslov, Best Original Screenplay co-winner

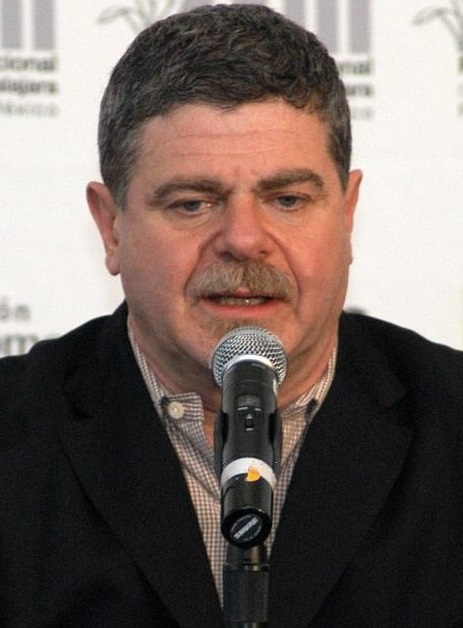
Gustavo Santaolalla, Best Original Song co-winner

=== Best Actor – Drama ===
Philip Seymour Hoffman – Capote

- Jake Gyllenhaal – Jarhead
- Tommy Lee Jones – The Three Burials of Melquiades Estrada
- Heath Ledger – Brokeback Mountain
- Viggo Mortensen – A History of Violence
- David Strathairn – Good Night, and Good Luck

=== Best Actor – Musical or Comedy ===
Terrence Howard – Hustle & Flow

- Kevin Costner – The Upside of Anger
- Robert Downey Jr. – Kiss Kiss Bang Bang
- Cillian Murphy – Breakfast on Pluto
- Bill Murray – Broken Flowers
- Joaquin Phoenix – Walk the Line

=== Best Actress – Drama ===
Felicity Huffman – Transamerica

- Toni Collette – In Her Shoes
- Julianne Moore – The Prize Winner of Defiance, Ohio
- Robin Wright Penn – Nine Lives
- Charlize Theron – North Country
- Ziyi Zhang – Memoirs of a Geisha

=== Best Actress – Musical or Comedy ===
Reese Witherspoon – Walk the Line

- Joan Allen – The Upside of Anger
- Claire Danes – Shopgirl
- Judi Dench – Mrs Henderson Presents
- Keira Knightley – Pride & Prejudice
- Joan Plowright – Mrs. Palfrey at the Claremont

=== Best Animated or Mixed Media Film ===
The Chronicles of Narnia: The Lion, the Witch and the Wardrobe

- Chicken Little
- Corpse Bride
- Howl's Moving Castle (Hauru no ugoku shiro)
- Wallace & Gromit: The Curse of the Were-Rabbit

=== Best Art Direction and Production Design ===
Good Night, and Good Luck

- Kingdom of Heaven
- Memoirs of a Geisha
- Modigliani
- Sin City
- Star Wars: Episode III – Revenge of the Sith

=== Best Cinematography ===
The Constant Gardener – César Charlone

- 2046 – Christopher Doyle
- Charlie and the Chocolate Factory – Philippe Rousselot
- Kung Fu Hustle (Kung fu) – Poon Hang-Sang
- Memoirs of a Geisha – Dion Beebe
- Sin City – Robert Rodriguez

=== Best Costume Design ===
Pride & Prejudice

- Harry Potter and the Goblet of Fire
- Kingdom of Heaven
- Memoirs of a Geisha
- Modigliani
- The White Countess

=== Best Director ===
Ang Lee – Brokeback Mountain

- George Clooney – Good Night, and Good Luck
- Chris Columbus – Rent
- James Mangold – Walk the Line
- Rob Marshall – Memoirs of a Geisha
- Bennett Miller – Capote

=== Best Documentary Film ===
Mad Hot Ballroom

- Enron: The Smartest Guys in the Room
- Favela Rising
- March of the Penguins (La marche de l'empereur)
- Murderball
- New York Doll

=== Best Editing ===
Brokeback Mountain

- Good Night, and Good Luck
- Jarhead
- Kung Fu Hustle (Kung fu)
- Sin City
- War of the Worlds

=== Best Film – Drama ===
Brokeback Mountain

- Capote
- Cinderella Man
- A History of Violence
- Memoirs of a Geisha
- The War Within

=== Best Film – Musical or Comedy ===
Walk the Line

- Happy Endings
- Hustle & Flow
- Kung Fu Hustle (Kung fu)
- Rent
- Shopgirl

=== Best Foreign Language Film ===
Äideistä parhain (Mother of Mine), Finland/Sweden

- 2046, China/France/Germany/Hong Kong
- Innocent Voices, Mexico/Puerto Rico/United States
- Lila Says, France/UK
- Turtles Can Fly, France/Iran/Iraq
- Walk on Water, Israel/Sweden

=== Best Original Score ===
"Kingdom of Heaven" – Harry Gregson-Williams

- "Brokeback Mountain" – Gustavo Santaolalla
- "The Constant Gardener" – Alberto Iglesias
- "Corpse Bride" – Danny Elfman
- "Memoirs of a Geisha" – John Williams
- "Sin City" – Robert Rodriguez

=== Best Original Song ===
"A Love That Will Never Grow Old" performed by Emmylou Harris – Brokeback Mountain

- "In the Deep" performed by Bird York – Crash
- "Hustler's Ambition" performed by 50 Cent – Get Rich or Die Tryin'
- "Magic Works" – Harry Potter and the Goblet of Fire
- "Broken" – Kiss Kiss Bang Bang

=== Best Screenplay – Adapted ===
Memoirs of a Geisha – Robin Swicord

- Brokeback Mountain – Larry McMurtry and Diana Ossana
- Capote – Dan Futterman
- Jarhead – William Broyles Jr.
- Shopgirl – Steve Martin
- Walk the Line – Gill Dennis and James Mangold

=== Best Screenplay – Original ===
Good Night, and Good Luck – George Clooney and Grant Heslov

- Crash – Paul Haggis and Bobby Moresco
- Happy Endings – Don Roos
- Nine Lives – Rodrigo García
- The Squid and the Whale – Noah Baumbach
- The War Within – Ayad Akhtar, Joseph Castelo, and Tom Glynn

=== Best Sound ===
Star Wars: Episode III – Revenge of the Sith

- Kung Fu Hustle (Kung fu)
- Rent
- Sin City
- The White Countess

=== Best Supporting Actor – Drama ===
Danny Huston – The Constant Gardener

- Chris Cooper – Capote
- Jake Gyllenhaal – Brokeback Mountain
- Edward Norton – Kingdom of Heaven
- Mickey Rourke – Sin City
- Peter Sarsgaard – Jarhead

=== Best Supporting Actor – Musical or Comedy ===
Val Kilmer – Kiss Kiss, Bang Bang

- Tom Arnold – Happy Endings
- Corbin Bernsen – Kiss Kiss Bang Bang
- Steve Coogan – Happy Endings
- Craig T. Nelson – The Family Stone
- Jason Schwartzman – Shopgirl

=== Best Supporting Actress – Drama ===
Laura Linney – The Squid and the Whale

- Amy Adams – Junebug
- Maria Bello – A History of Violence
- Li Gong – Memoirs of a Geisha
- Shirley MacLaine – In Her Shoes
- Frances McDormand – North Country

=== Best Supporting Actress – Musical or Comedy ===
Rosario Dawson – Rent

- America Ferrera – The Sisterhood of the Traveling Pants
- Diane Keaton – The Family Stone
- Rachel McAdams – The Family Stone
- Michelle Monaghan – Kiss Kiss Bang Bang
- Qiu Yuen – Kung Fu Hustle (Kung fu)

=== Best Visual Effects ===
Star Wars: Episode III – Revenge of the Sith

- Kingdom of Heaven
- Kung Fu Hustle (Kung fu)
- Sin City
- War of the Worlds

=== Outstanding Motion Picture Ensemble ===
Crash

== Television winners and nominees ==
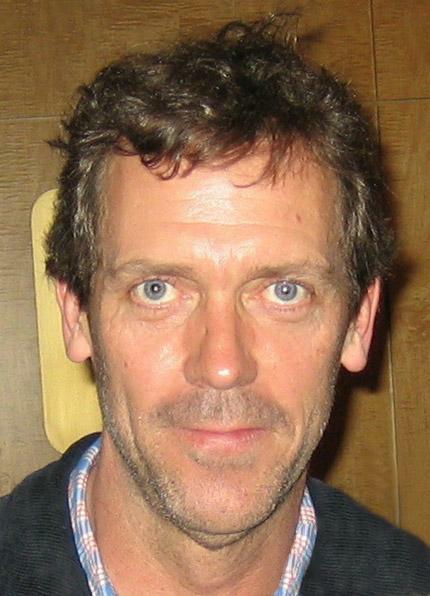
Hugh Laurie, Best Actor in a Drama Series winner

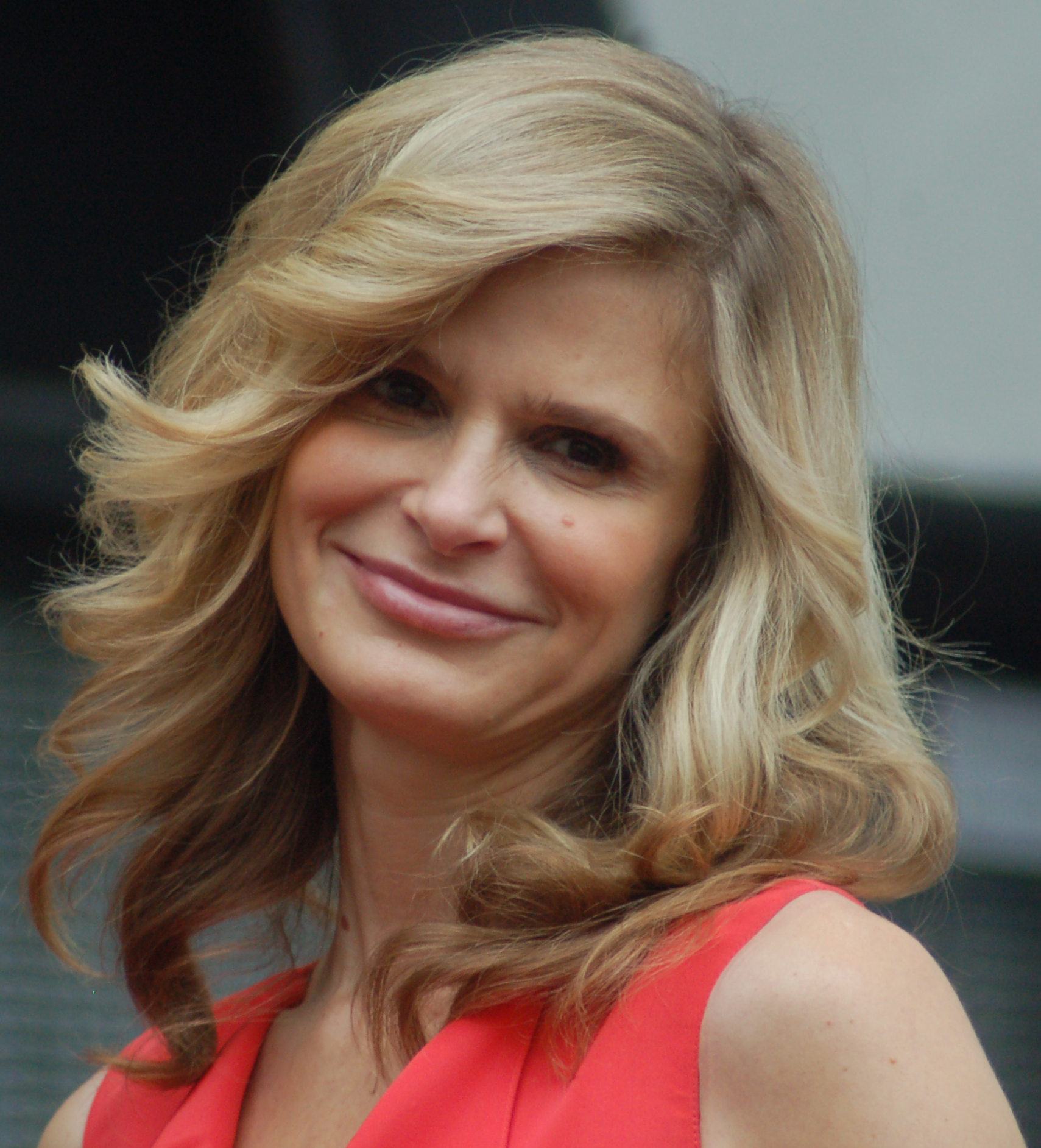
Kyra Sedgwick, Best Actress in a Drama Series winner

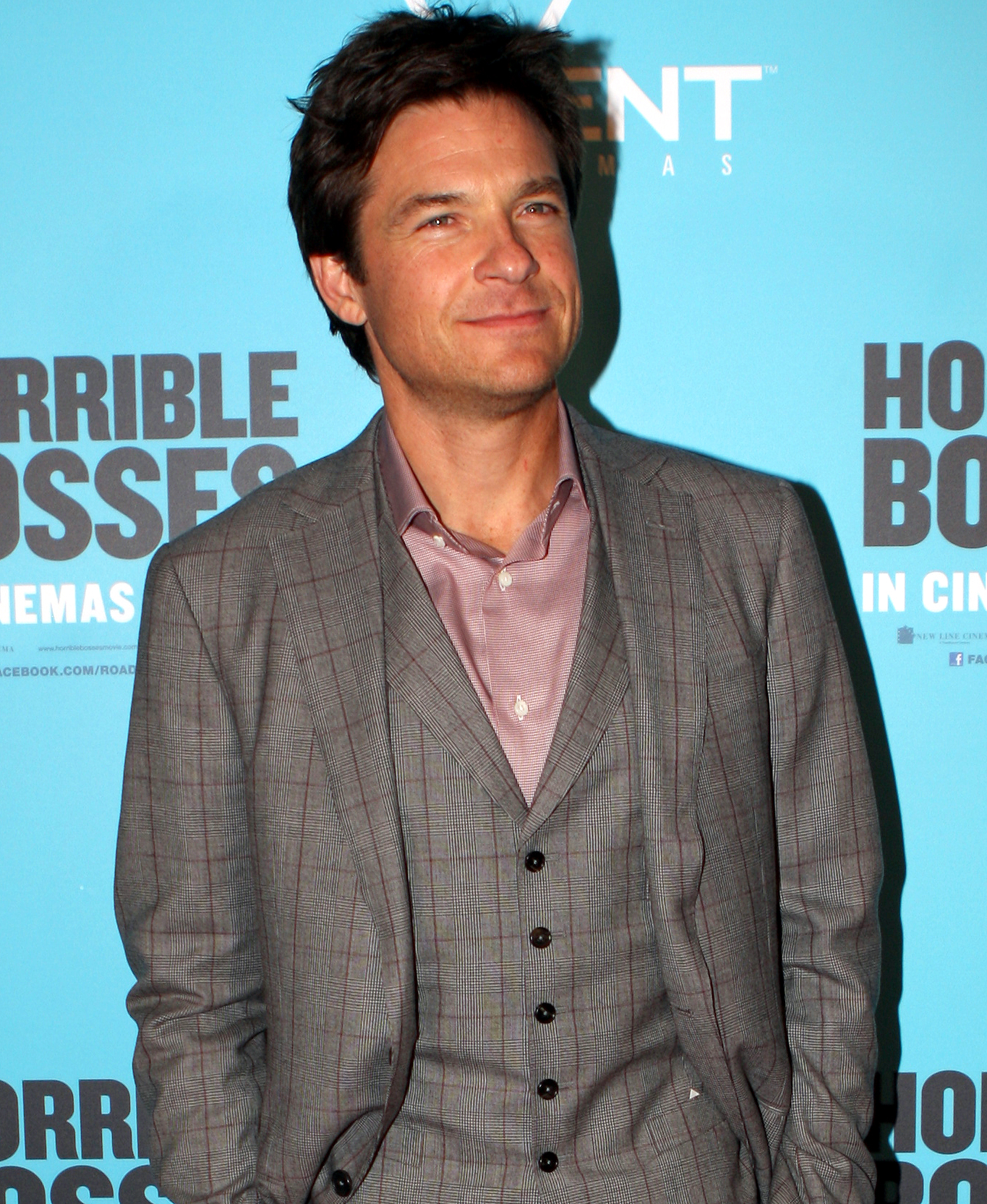
Jason Bateman, Best Actor in a Comedy or Musical Series winner

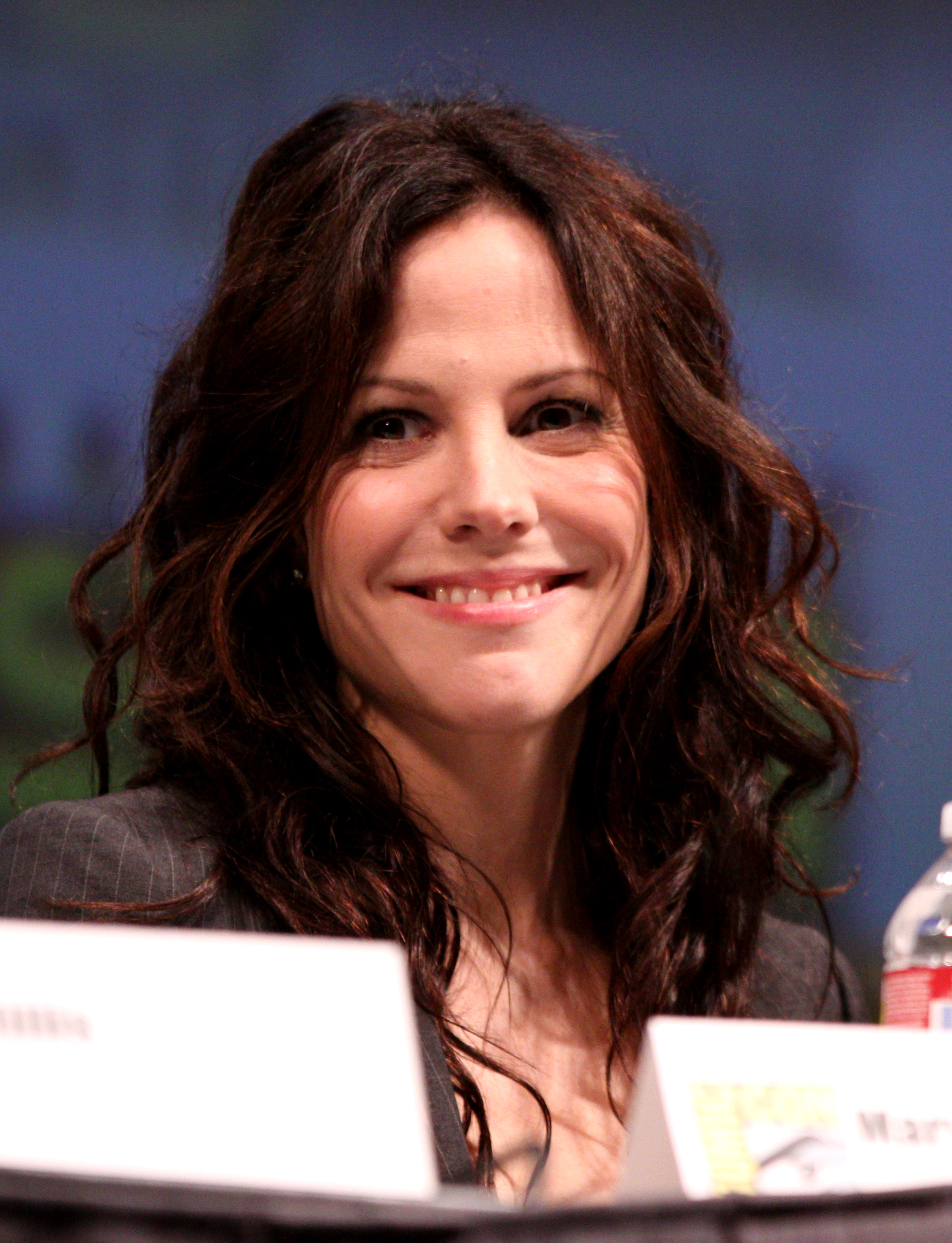
Mary-Louise Parker, Best Actress in a Comedy or Musical Series co-winner

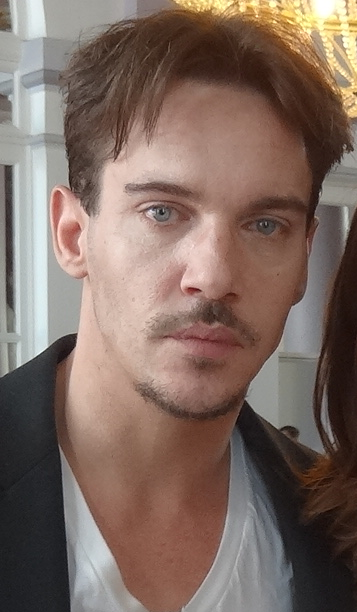
Jonathan Rhys Meyers, Best Actor in a Miniseries or Television Film winner

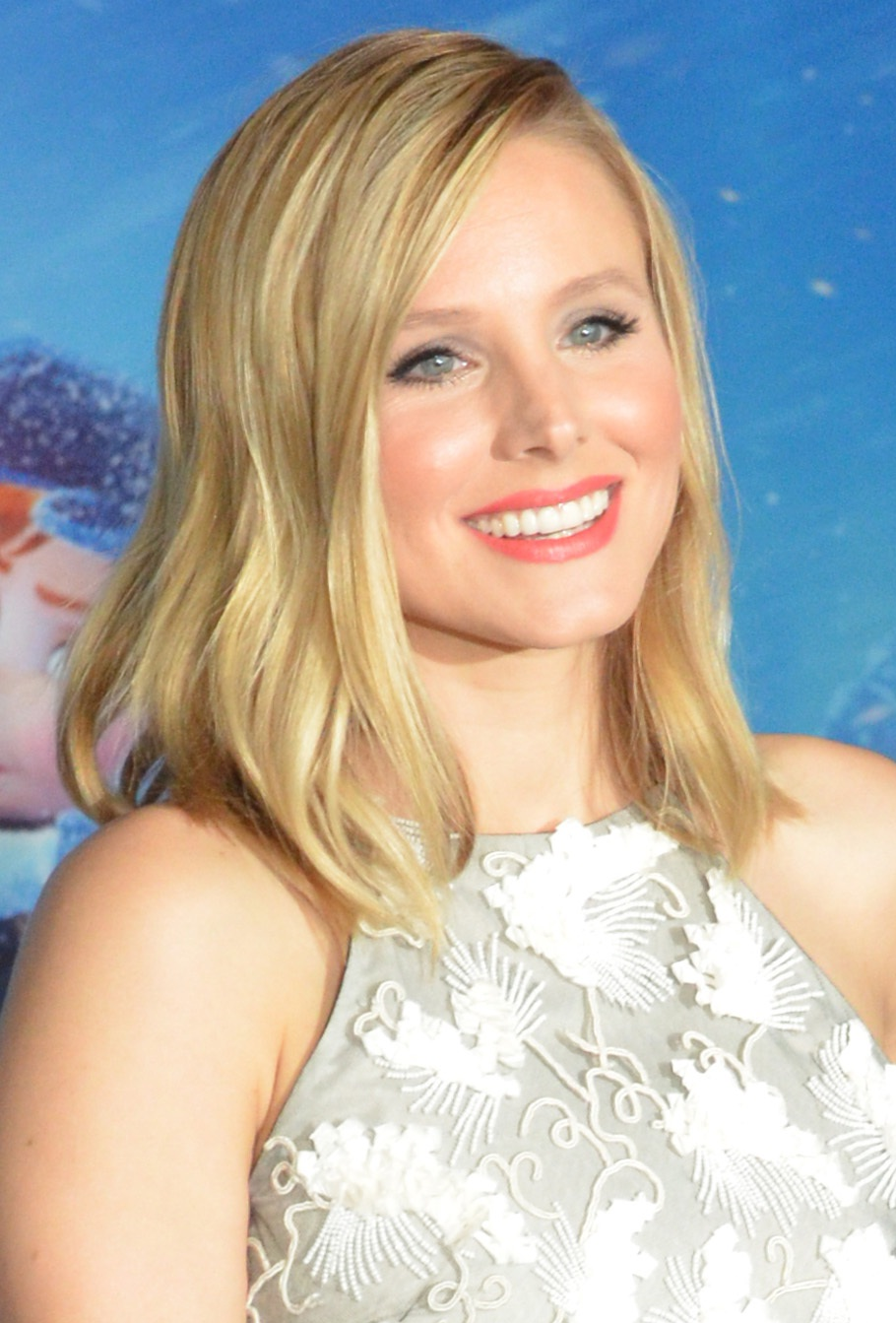
Kristen Bell, Best Actress in a Miniseries or Television Film winner

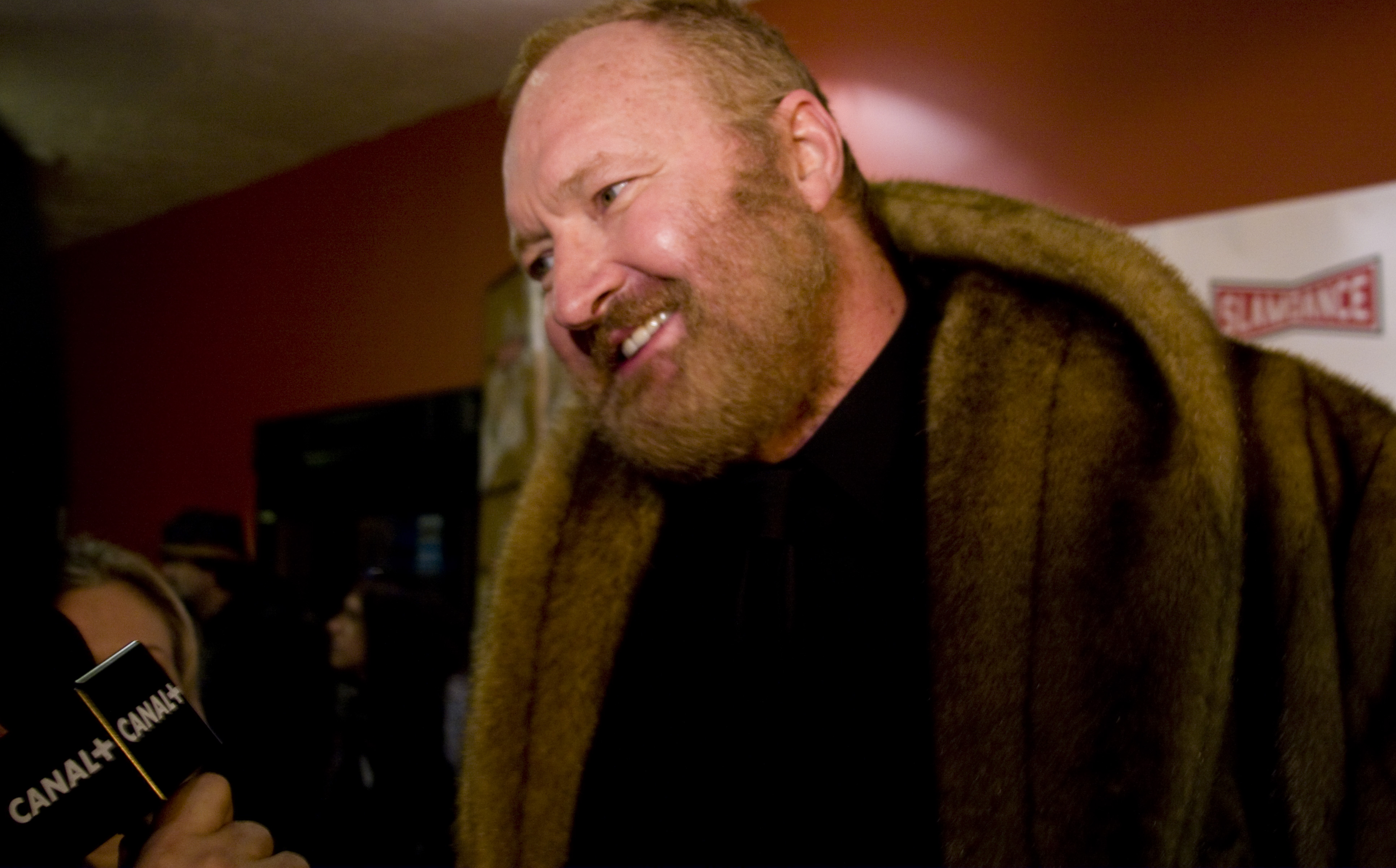
Randy Quaid, Best Supporting Actor in a Series, Miniseries, or Television Film winner

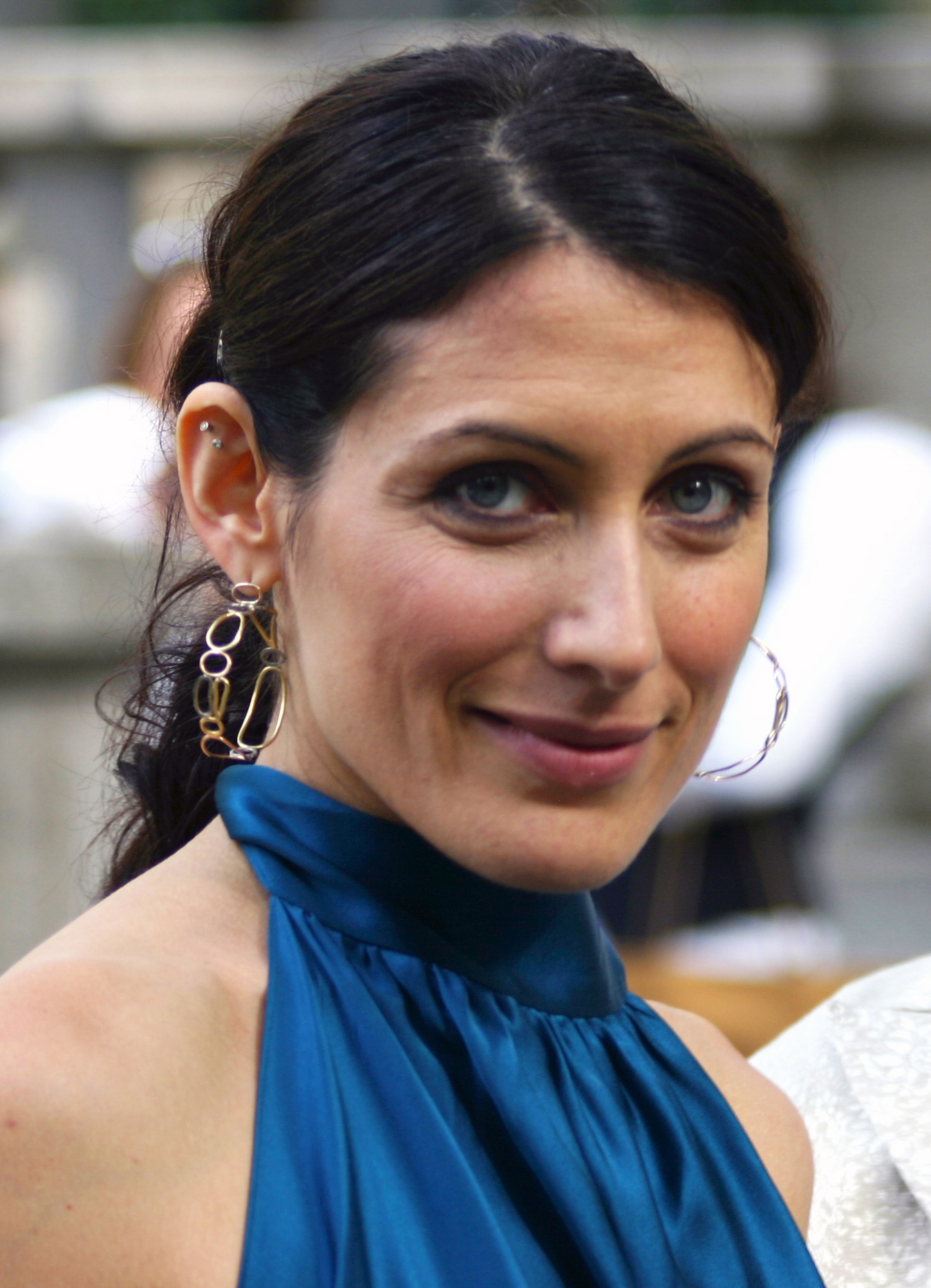
Lisa Edelstein, Best Supporting Actress in a Series, Miniseries, or Television Film winner

=== Best Actor – Drama Series ===
Hugh Laurie – House, M.D.

- Denis Leary – Rescue Me
- Ian McShane – Deadwood
- Dylan Walsh – Nip/Tuck
- Jake Weber – Medium

=== Best Actor – Musical or Comedy Series ===
Jason Bateman – Arrested Development

- Stephen Colbert – The Colbert Report
- Kevin Connolly – Entourage
- Jason Lee – My Name Is Earl
- Tony Shalhoub – Monk
- James Spader – Boston Legal

=== Best Actor – Miniseries or TV Film ===
Jonathan Rhys Meyers – Elvis

- Kenneth Branagh – Warm Springs
- Christian Campbell – Reefer Madness: The Movie Musical
- Ted Danson – Our Fathers
- Rupert Everett – Sherlock Holmes and the Case of the Silk Stocking
- Ed Harris – Empire Falls

=== Best Actress – Drama Series ===
Kyra Sedgwick – The Closer

- Patricia Arquette – Medium
- Jennifer Beals – The L Word
- Kristen Bell – Veronica Mars
- Geena Davis – Commander in Chief
- Joely Richardson – Nip/Tuck

=== Best Actress – Musical or Comedy Series ===
Felicity Huffman – Desperate Housewives (TIE)
Mary-Louise Parker – Weeds (TIE)

- Candice Bergen – Boston Legal
- Lauren Graham – Gilmore Girls
- Elizabeth Perkins – Weeds

=== Best Actress – Miniseries or TV Film ===
Kristen Bell – Reefer Madness: The Movie Musical

- Natascha McElhone – Revelations
- Geraldine McEwan – Agatha Christie's Marple
- S. Epatha Merkerson – Lackawanna Blues
- Cynthia Nixon – Warm Springs
- Keri Russell – The Magic of Ordinary Days

=== Best Miniseries ===
Elvis

- Agatha Christie's Marple
- Empire Falls
- Into the West
- Revelations
- The Virgin Queen

=== Best Series – Drama ===
House, M.D.

- Grey's Anatomy
- Lost
- Nip/Tuck
- Rescue Me
- Rome

=== Best Series – Musical or Comedy ===
The Daily Show with Jon Stewart

- Boston Legal
- The Colbert Report
- Entourage
- My Name Is Earl

=== Best Supporting Actor – Miniseries or TV Film ===
Randy Quaid – Elvis

- Tim Blake Nelson – Warm Springs
- Paul Newman – Empire Falls
- Ruben Santiago-Hudson – Their Eyes Were Watching God
- William Shatner – Boston Legal

=== Best Supporting Actress – Miniseries or TV Film ===
Lisa Edelstein – House, M.D.

- Shohreh Aghdashloo – 24
- Jane Alexander – Warm Springs
- Camryn Manheim – Elvis
- Sandra Oh – Grey's Anatomy
- Polly Walker – Rome

=== Best TV Film ===
Reefer Madness: The Movie Musical

- Kidnapped
- Lackawanna Blues
- The Magic of Ordinary Days
- Our Fathers
- Sometimes in April
- Warm Springs

=== Outstanding Television Ensemble ===
Rescue Me

== New Media winners and nominees ==
=== Best Classic DVD ===
The Wizard of Oz Three Disc Collector's Edition.

- Airplane! "Don't Call Me Shirley" Edition.
- Cat People, The Curse of the Cat People, I Walked with a Zombie, The Body Snatcher, Isle of the Dead, Bedlam, The Leopard Man, The Ghost Ship, The Seventh Victim, and Shadows in the Dark: The Val Lewton Legacy
- The Devil's Rejects Unrated Widescreen Edition.
- Gladiator Extended Edition.
- King Kong, The Son of Kong, and Mighty Joe Young For the King Kong Collection (2-Disc Special Edition).
- The Man with the Golden Arm 50th Anniversary Edition.
- Pickpocket
- Saboteur, Shadow of a Doubt, Rope, Rear Window, The Trouble with Harry, The Man Who Knew Too Much, Vertigo, Psycho, The Birds, Marnie, Torn Curtain, Topaz, Frenzy, and Family Plot For Alfred Hitchcock: The Masterpiece Collection.
- Seven Men from Now Special Collector's Edition.
- The Sound of Music 40th Anniversary Edition.
- Titanic Special Collector's Edition.
- Top Hat, Swing Time, Follow the Fleet, Shall We Dance, and The Barkleys of Broadway For the Astaire and Rogers Collection, Vol. 1.

=== Best Documentary DVD ===
Mad Hot Ballroom

- The Concert for Bangladesh Limited Collector's Edition
- Kinsey Two-Disc Special Edition
- March of the Penguins
- American Experience For episode "Mary Pickford (#17.6)".
- Murderball
- No Direction Home: Bob Dylan
- Rize
- The Wild Parrots of Telegraph Hill

=== Best DVD Extras ===
Titanic Special Collector's Edition.

- Airplane! "Don't Call Me Shirley" Edition.
- The Big Lebowski Widescreen Collector's Edition.
- Crash Widescreen Edition.
- King Kong, The Son of Kong, and Mighty Joe Young For the King Kong Collection (2-Disc Special Edition).
- Office Space Special Edition With Flair!
- Oldboy
- Saw Uncut Edition.
- Sin City Re-Cut & Extended Edition.
- The Wizard of Oz Three Disc Collector's Edition.

=== Best DVD Release of TV Shows ===
24 For Season Four.

- Curb Your Enthusiasm Complete Fourth Season.
- Deadwood Complete First Season.
- Desperate Housewives Complete First Season.
- Entourage Complete First Season.
- House, M.D. For Season One.
- The L Word Complete Second Season.
- Lost Complete First Season.
- Rescue Me Complete First Season.
- Seinfeld For Season 6.
- The Simpsons Complete Seventh Season (Collectible Marge Head Pack).
- South Park Complete Sixth Season.

=== Outstanding Game Based on a Previous Medium ===
X-Men Legends II: Rise of Apocalypse

- Æon Flux
- Charlie and the Chocolate Factory
- Chicken Little
- Ed, Edd n Eddy: The Mis-Edventures
- The Incredibles: Rise of the Underminer
- King Kong: The Official Game of the Movie
- Star Wars: Battlefront II
- Star Wars: Episode III – Revenge of the Sith

=== Outstanding Overall DVD ===
From the Earth to the Moon Signature Edition.

- Batman Begins Two-Disc Deluxe Edition With Comic Book.
- The Big Lebowski Widescreen Collector's Edition.
- Cinderella Man Widescreen Collector's Edition.
- The Crying Game Collector's Edition.
- Jaws Widescreen 30th Anniversary Collection.
- Office Space Special Edition With Flair!
- Sin City Re-Cut & Extended Edition.
- Star Wars: Episode III – Revenge of the Sith Widescreen Edition.
- Titanic Special Collector's Edition.
- War of the Worlds 2-Disc Limited Edition.
- The Wizard of Oz Three Disc Collector's Edition.

=== Outstanding Platform Action/Adventure Game ===
Mortal Kombat: Shaolin Monks

- Area 51
- Battlefield 2: Modern Combat
- Call of Duty 2
- Death by Degrees
- Oddworld: Stranger's Wrath
- Psychonauts
- Tak: The Great Juju Challenge

=== Outstanding Puzzle/Strategy Game ===
Pump It Up: Exceed SE

- Black & White 2
- The Sims 2

=== Outstanding Sports/Fighting/Racing Game ===
Burnout Revenge

- 187 Ride or Die
- Blitz: The League
- L.A. Rush
- NBA Street Volume 3
- Tekken 5

=== Outstanding Youth DVD ===
Toy Story 2 2-Disc Special Edition.

- Bambi Disney Special Platinum Edition.
- Charlie and the Chocolate Factory 2-Disc Deluxe Edition.
- Cinderella 2-Disc Special Edition.
- Madagascar Widescreen Edition.
- The Muppet Movie For Kermit's 50th Anniversary Edition.
- The Sisterhood of the Traveling Pants Widescreen Edition.
- The Sound of Music 40th Anniversary Edition.
- The Wizard of Oz Three Disc Collector's Edition.

== Awards breakdown ==
=== Film ===
Winners:

4 / 8 Brokeback Mountain: Best Director & Editing / Best Film – Drama / Best Original Song
2 / 3 The Constant Gardener: Best Cinematography / Best Supporting Actor – Drama
2 / 3 Star Wars: Episode III – Revenge of the Sith: Best Sound & Visual Effects
2 / 5 Good Night, and Good Luck: Best Art Direction and Production Design / Best Screenplay – Original
2 / 5 Walk the Line: Best Actress & Film – Musical or Comedy
1 / 1 Mother of Mine (Äideistä parhain): Best Foreign Language Film
1 / 1 The Chronicles of Narnia: The Lion, the Witch and the Wardrobe: Best Animated or Mixed Media Film
1 / 1 Mad Hot Ballroom: Best Documentary Film
1 / 1 Transamerica: Best Actress – Drama
1 / 2 Hustle & Flow: Best Actor – Musical or Comedy
1 / 2 Pride & Prejudice: Best Costume Design
1 / 2 The Squid and the Whale: Best Supporting Actress – Drama
1 / 3 Crash: Outstanding Motion Picture Ensemble
1 / 4 Rent: Best Supporting Actress – Musical or Comedy
1 / 5 Capote: Best Actor – Drama
1 / 5 Kingdom of Heaven: Best Original Score
1 / 5 Kiss Kiss Bang Bang: Best Supporting Actor – Musical or Comedy
1 / 9 Memoirs of a Geisha: Best Screenplay – Adapted

Losers:

0 / 7 Sin City
0 / 6 Kung Fu Hustle (Kung fu)
0 / 4 Happy Endings, Jarhead, Shopgirl
0 / 3 The Family Stone, A History of Violence
0 / 2 2046, Corpse Bride, Harry Potter and the Goblet of Fire, In Her Shoes, Modigliani, Nine Lives, North Country, The Upside of Anger, War of the Worlds, The War Within, The White Countess

=== Television ===
Winners:

3 / 3 House, M.D.: Best Actor – Drama Series / Best Series – Drama / Best Supporting Actress – Miniseries or TV Film
3 / 4 Elvis: Best Actor – Miniseries or TV Film / Best Miniseries / Best Supporting Actor – Miniseries or TV Film
2 / 3 Reefer Madness: The Movie Musical: Best Actress – Miniseries or TV Film / Best TV Film
1 / 1 Arrested Development: Best Actor – Musical or Comedy Series
1 / 1 The Closer: Best Actress – Drama Series
1 / 1 The Daily Show with Jon Stewart: Best Series – Musical or Comedy Series
1 / 1 Desperate Housewives: Best Actress – Musical or Comedy Series
1 / 1 Weeds: Best Actress – Musical or Comedy Series
1 / 3 Rescue Me: Outstanding Television Ensemble

Losers:

0 / 5 Warm Springs
0 / 4 Boston Legal
0 / 3 Empire Falls, Nip/Tuck
0 / 2 Agatha Christie's Marple, The Colbert Report, Entourage, Grey's Anatomy, Lackawanna Blues, The Magic of Ordinary Days, Medium, My Name Is Earl, Our Fathers, Revelations, Rome
