= Skeet Ulrich =

American actor (born 1970)

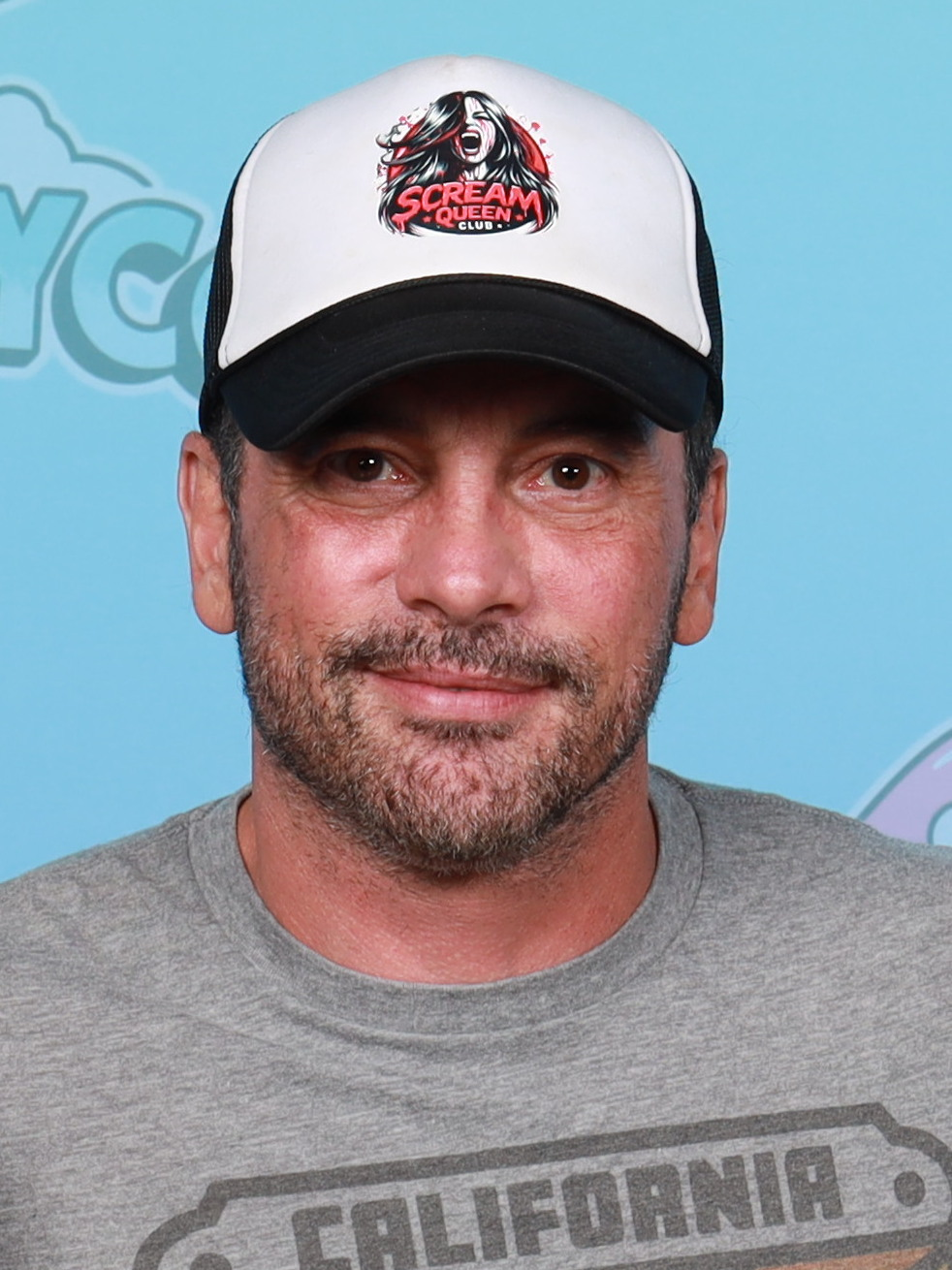
- Ulrich in 2025
- Born: Bryan Ray Trout; January 20, 1970 (age 56); Lynchburg, Virginia, U.S.
- Occupation: Actor
- Years active: 1989–present
- Spouses: Georgina Cates (m. 1997; div. 2005) Amelia Jackson-Gray (m. 2012; div. 2015)
- Children: 2

Skeet Ulrich (/ˈʌlrɪtʃ/; born Bryan Ray Trout on January 20, 1970) is an American actor. He is best known for his roles in popular 1990s films, including Billy Loomis in Scream (1996), Chris Hooker in The Craft (1996), and Vincent Lopiano in As Good as It Gets (1997). From 2017 to 2021, he starred as Forsythe Pendleton "F.P." Jones II on The CW's Riverdale. He reprised his Scream role in the sequels Scream (2022) and Scream VI (2023). His other television roles include Johnston Jacob "Jake" Green Jr. in the television series Jericho, and LAPD Detective Rex Winters, a Marine veteran from the Law & Order franchise.

== Early life ==
Bryan Ray Trout was born on January 20, 1970, in Lynchburg, Virginia. His mother, Carolyn Elaine Wax (née Rudd), owns the special events marketing agency Sports Management Group, and his father is a restaurateur. He has an elder brother, Geoff. His first stepfather was D. K. Ulrich, a NASCAR driver and team owner, whom he considers his father. In 1990, his mother remarried to Edward Lewis Wax. Ulrich's maternal uncle is Hall of Fame NASCAR driver Ricky Rudd, and his maternal grandfather was Alvin Ray Rudd Sr., the president of Al Rudd Auto Parts.

Ulrich's father kidnapped him and his brother when he was six years old, and they spent the next three years moving from Florida to New York and then to Pennsylvania. They were reunited with their mother in North Carolina, where his father disappeared from his life.

The nickname "Skeet" originated from "Skeeter", a nickname he was given by his Little League coach because of his small stature and because he was fast as a mosquito. Along with his slight frame, he had poor health as a child, including numerous bouts with pneumonia; he underwent open-heart surgery to repair a defective ventricle. Ulrich graduated from Northwest Cabarrus High School in North Carolina. After enrolling at the University of North Carolina Wilmington to study marine biology, he switched to New York University, where he studied under playwright David Mamet.

== Career ==
In his earliest screen appearances, Ulrich was an uncredited extra in films Weekend at Bernie's (1989) and Teenage Mutant Ninja Turtles (1990). After joining the Atlantic Theater Company as an apprentice, Ulrich performed with the group, which got him noticed by director Stacy Cochran. She cast him in an episode of CBS Schoolbreak Special. With her help, he also received his first notable role on screen in 1996 as the loutish boyfriend of Winona Ryder in Boys. That same year, he also appeared in Kevin Spacey's directorial debut Albino Alligator and The Craft alongside Robin Tunney and Neve Campbell. He was cast that same year to star alongside Campbell again in Wes Craven's slasher film Scream as Billy Loomis where, during production, he was accidentally stabbed in the area where he had open-heart surgery.

In 1997, he had a small role as an emotionally conflicted gay hustler in As Good as It Gets (along with fellow Scream actor Jamie Kennedy). He appeared in films like The Newton Boys (1998) with Matthew McConaughey and Ethan Hawke, and Chill Factor (1999) (along with fellow As Good as It Gets actor Cuba Gooding Jr.). He starred as Juvenal, a young man with stigmata and healing powers in the Paul Schrader film Touch (1997), and he appeared in Ride with the Devil (1999), an American Civil War drama directed by Ang Lee. In 2000, he played computer hacker Kevin Mitnick in the film Track Down.

On television, Ulrich starred in the short-lived ABC series Miracles and appeared in TNT's multiple Emmy-nominated miniseries Into the West (2005 in the U.S., 2006 in the U.K.). Also in 2005, Ulrich acted with Keri Russell in the television film The Magic of Ordinary Days. He starred as Johnston Jacob "Jake" Green Jr. on the CBS post-apocalyptic drama Jericho, which premiered on September 20, 2006 and ended its run on March 25, 2008. The series was cancelled after its first season but was brought back due to fan outcry and support. Fans lobbied the studio, and the series was brought back for a shortened second season.

Ulrich is a recurring guest voice actor on the Adult Swim animated stop-motion sketch comedy series Robot Chicken. In sketches based on G.I. Joe, Ulrich voices the character Duke. Ulrich guest-starred in three episodes of CSI: NY as a complex and disturbed killer. From 2017 to 2021, he starred as Forsythe Pendleton "F.P." Jones II, the father of Jughead Jones, in Riverdale on The CW, loosely based on the Archie comic book series.

Ulrich appeared as Brian David Mitchell in the 2017 television film I Am Elizabeth Smart, based on the 2002 abduction and captivity of Elizabeth Smart. He also played Brice Cobb in the 2018 horror movie Escape Room.

In 2022, Ulrich reprised his role as Billy Loomis in the fifth film in the Scream series, also titled Scream. He did so again in 2023 in Scream VI. In 2024, he presented the award for Best Wide Release at the Fangoria Chainsaw Awards.

In 2025, Ulrich reunited with Matthew Lillard in Five Nights at Freddy's 2.

== Personal life ==
In 1997, Ulrich married English actress Georgina Cates, whom he met at an Academy Awards party. Their wedding was a small ceremony held on their farmland in Madison County, Virginia, with only the preacher as a guest. They have twins, a daughter and son, born in 2001. Ulrich and Cates separated in 2004 and filed for divorce in 2005, citing irreconcilable differences.

Ulrich married actress Amelia Jackson-Gray in 2012, and they divorced in 2015. In 2016, Ulrich became engaged to Brazilian model Rose Costa, but the couple split in 2017.

Ulrich enjoys woodworking.

== Filmography ==
=== Film ===
List of films and roles
Year	Title	Role	Notes	Ref.
1989	Weekend at Bernie's	Extra	Uncredited	
1990	Teenage Mutant Ninja Turtles	Thug	Uncredited	
1996	The Craft	Chris Hooker		
1996	Last Dance	Billy Liggett		
1996	Boys	Bud Valentine		
1996	Albino Alligator	Danny Boudreaux		
1996	Scream	Billy Loomis		
1997	Touch	Juvenal / Charlie Lawson		
1997	As Good as It Gets	Vincent Lopiano		
1998	The Newton Boys	Joe Newton		
1999	Chill Factor	Tim Mason		
1999	Ride with the Devil	Jack Bull Chiles		
2000	Track Down	Kevin Mitnick		
2001	Nobody's Baby	Billy Raedeen		
2001	Soul Assassin	Kevin Burke		
2001	Kevin of the North	Kevin Manley		
2009	For Sale by Owner	Junior		
2009	Armored	Dobbs		
2013	Point Mugu	The Hitchhiker	Short film; also producer	
2014	50 to 1	Chip Woolley		
2014	The Girl on the Roof	—N/a	Short film; director	
2017	Austin Found	Billy Fontaine		
2018	Escape Room	Brice Cobb		
2022	Scream	Billy Loomis		
2022	Blood	Patrick		
2023	Scream VI	Billy Loomis	Cameo	
2023	Supercell	Roy Cameron		
2025	Salvation	Elvis		
2025	Five Nights at Freddy's 2	Henry Emily		
2026	Street Smart	Sarge		
TBA	Devoted †	Ben	Post-production	
TBA	The Big Kill †	Nathan	Post-production	

Key
†	Denotes films that have not yet been released

=== Television ===
Year	Title	Role	Notes	Ref.
1994	CBS Schoolbreak Special	Vinnie DiFazio	Episode: "Same Difference"	
1998	A Soldier's Sweetheart	Mark Fossie	Television film	
2003	Miracles	Paul Callan	Main role; 13 episodes	
2005	The Magic of Ordinary Days	Ray Singleton	Television film	
2005	Into the West	Jethro Wheeler	Miniseries; 3 episodes	
2006–2008	Jericho	Johnston Jacob "Jake" Green Jr.	Main role; 29 episodes	
2007–2021	Robot Chicken	Various roles	Voice; 10 episodes	
2009	Back	Richard Miles	Television film	
2009	CSI: NY	Hollis Eckhart	3 episodes	
2010	Gimme Shelter	Billy Jost	Television film	
2010	Law & Order: Special Victims Unit	Detective Rex Winters	Episode: "Behave"	
2010–2011	Law & Order: LA	Detective Rex Winters	Main role; 14 episodes	
2013	Anatomy of Violence	Adrian Raines	Television film	
2015–2016	Unforgettable	Eddie Martin	2 episodes	
2017	I Am Elizabeth Smart	Brian David Mitchell	Television film	
2017–2021	Riverdale	Forsythe Pendleton "F.P." Jones II	Recurring role (season 1), Main role (seasons 2–5); 64 episodes	
2020	FreeRayshawn	Sgt. Mike Trout	Main role; 10 episodes	
2024	Parish	Colin Broussard	Main role; 6 episodes	
2024	Parish	Craig Broussard	Episode: "Sanctuary"	

=== Video games ===
Year	Title	Role	Notes	Ref.
2024	Mortal Kombat 1	Billy Loomis / Ghostface	Likeness only; Khaos Reigns downloadable content	
2024	The Texas Chain Saw Massacre	Wyatt Dunn	Voice; downloadable content	

== Awards and nominations ==
Year	Award	Category	Work	Result
1997	Fangoria Chainsaw Awards	Best Supporting Actor	Scream	Nominated
1997	Saturn Awards	Best Supporting Actor	Scream	Nominated
2006	CAMIE Awards	—N/a	The Magic of Ordinary Days	Won
2006	Western Heritage Awards	Television Feature Film	Into the West	Won
2014	Williamsburg Independent Film Festival	Best Breakout Director	The Girl on the Roof	Won
