= Escape Room (2018 film) =

- Home media cover
- Directed by: Peter Dukes
- Written by: Peter Dukes
- Starring: Skeet Ulrich; Sean Young
- Cinematography: Pierluigi Malavasi
- Edited by: Eric Won
- Music by: D. E. Christensen; Deputi
- Release date: May 8, 2018 (Redbox)
- Running time: 86 minutes
- Country: United States
- Language: English

Escape Room is a 2018 American horror film directed by Peter Dukes and starring Skeet Ulrich. The film centers on a group of survivors who challenged themselves to an escape room. The owner of the place bought an antique demonic box to be used as a prop, which turns out to be evil that possesses whoever opens it and kills the victims.

== Plot ==
Brice, the owner of a horror Escape Room, wants to up the ante of his rooms to compete with new rooms opening in his area. He visits an antique store and finds an ancient, "cursed" box and puts it in his new room. Four friends visit the room and discover a deadly game created by the demon in the box. They are unable to leave the room unless they solve the puzzles.

== Cast ==
- Skeet Ulrich as Brice
- Sean Young as Ramona
- Christine Donlon as Jess
- Randy Wayne as Jeff
- Matt McVay as Ben
- Ashley Gallegos as Angie
- Hayley Goldstein as Molly
- Iyad Hajjaj as Ammon
- Ibrahim Elkest as Mohamed
- Taylor Piedmonte as Stitchface
- Hayley Mclaughin as Hannah

== Production ==
Filming wrapped in May 2016.

== Release ==
The film was released via Redbox on May 8, 2018.
