= Georgina Cates =

English actress (1975–2026)

- Born: Clare Elaine Woodgate; 4 April 1975; Colchester, Essex, England
- Died: 6 May 2026 (aged 51)
- Occupation: Actress
- Years active: 1991–1998, 2008–2016
- Spouse: Skeet Ulrich (m. 1997; div. 2005)
- Children: 2

Georgina Elaine Cates (born Clare Elaine Woodgate; 4 April 1975 – 6 May 2026) was an English actress, known for her role as Jenny Porter in 2point4 Children and also in 1995 romance film An Awfully Big Adventure.

== Life and career ==
Born Clare Elaine Woodgate in Colchester, Cates attended Colchester County High School for Girls and broke into television acting when she was 16 years old, playing the role of Jenny Porter, in the first two series of the BBC's sitcom 2point4 Children.

In 1995, Cates (then still known as Clare Woodgate) auditioned for the role of Stella in the film An Awfully Big Adventure but was not cast. On returning home, she dyed her hair red and reinvented herself as a 17-year-old Liverpudlian girl called Georgina Cates who had no previous acting experience. When she re-applied for the same role, the casting director hired her. She went on to appear in such films as Frankie Starlight (1995), Illuminata (1998), and A Soldier's Sweetheart (1998). She received critical acclaim for her role as Amanda in Clay Pigeons (1998) with Vince Vaughn and Joaquin Phoenix. After a seven-year break from the film industry, Cates returned to the independent film genre to co-star in Sinner, for which she won a Best Actress award at the Brooklyn Arts Council International Film & Video Festival.

Cates died on 6 May 2026, aged 51.

== Awards ==
- Best Actress in a Leading Role, Sinner, 41st Annual Brooklyn Arts Council International Film & Video Festival
- Actress of the Year (Nominee), An Awfully Big Adventure, 1996 London Critics Circle Film Awards

== Filmography ==
Year	Title	Role	Notes
1991–1992	2point4 Children	Jenny Porter	TV series
1992	The Ruth Rendell Mysteries	Sophie Stacey	Episode: "An Unwanted Woman: Part 2"
1993	Casualty	Emily Russell	Episode: "Life in the Fast Lane"
1993	An Exchange of Fire	Olga Slajek	TV film
1993	The Debutante	Amber	Short film
1993	The Bill	Susie Harper	Episode: "The Price of Fame"
1994	The Bill	Lorraine Lee	Episode: "House Arrest"
1994	Au Pair	Susan	
1994	Chris Cross	Annette Morton	Episode: "Politics"
1995	Loving	Edith	TV film
1995	Ghosts	Maureen / Young Margaret	Episode: "The Shadowy Third"
1995	An Awfully Big Adventure	Stella	
1995	Frankie Starlight	Young Emma	
1997	Big City Blues	Angela	
1998	Illuminata	Simone	
1998	A Soldier's Sweetheart	Marianne Bell	
1998	Stiff Upper Lips	Emily	
1998	The Treat	Mimi	
1998	Clay Pigeons	Amanda	
2007	Sinner	Lil	
2008	The Upshot	Samantha	TV film
2009	The Closer	Kim Sherman	Episode: "Elysian Fields"
2013	Jackass Presents: Bad Grandpa	Kimmie	
2014	Jackass Presents: Bad Grandpa.5	Kimmie	Direct-to-video
2014	Everlasting	Elaine Insane	
2016	Save Me from the Sound of the Siren	Madeleine	Short film
