= Clay Pigeons =

- Theatrical release poster
- Directed by: David Dobkin
- Written by: Matt Healy
- Produced by: Ridley Scott; Tony Scott; Chris Zarpas
- Starring: Joaquin Phoenix; Vince Vaughn; Janeane Garofalo; Georgina Cates; Scott Wilson
- Cinematography: Eric Alan Edwards
- Edited by: Stan Salfas
- Music by: John Lurie
- Production companies: Gramercy Pictures; Scott Free Productions
- Distributed by: PolyGram Filmed Entertainment
- Release dates: September 25, 1998 (United States); July 22, 1999 (Germany)
- Running time: 104 minutes
- Countries: United States; Germany
- Language: English
- Budget: $8 million
- Box office: $1.7 million

Clay Pigeons is a 1998 black comedy film written by Matt Healy and directed by David Dobkin, and starring Joaquin Phoenix, Vince Vaughn and Janeane Garofalo.

It is the second on-screen collaboration between Vaughn and Phoenix, the first film being Return to Paradise, released in the same year.

== Plot ==
In a field in Montana, Clay Bidwell's best friend Earl, dies by suicide after confronting Clay over the ongoing affair he had been having with Earl's wife Amanda. Earl, having just found out, was distraught and wanted to make it look like Clay had murdered him so he turns the gun on himself.

Rushing back to town, Clay seeks help from Amanda to cover it up but she refuses; she doesn't want everyone knowing about her affair with Clay. With great difficulty, Clay manages to get Earl's body into Earl's pickup truck and create the appearance that Earl drove it down an incline, where it crashed and burned.

A short time after Earl's funeral, Clay arrives home to find an indifferent, half-naked Amanda pressing him to continue with their affair as if nothing has happened. Feeling guilty, Clay resists Amanda's advances when she throws herself at him. Clay inadvertently befriends a man named Lester Long in the bar, who witnesses Amanda's behavior.

A jealous Amanda kills Gloria, a waitress Clay briefly dates. While they are making love, Amanda convinces Clay not to report the murder. He dumps Gloria's body in the lake, and the next day Clay and Lester go fishing. A body floats to the surface which Clay can only assume is Gloria. Lester asks him to report it on his own so he isn't late for work.

Later on, Clay comes across Lester at his Amanda's place. Lester subsequently spends the whole day with Amanda, at the end of which he stabs her several times. Unbeknownst to Clay, Lester is a serial killer. The following morning, Clay follows police cruisers to Amanda's and finds out she's been stabbed to death.

Soon enough, FBI agent Dale Shelby and her partner Reynard come to town and examine the unprofessionally controlled crime scene. They zero in on Clay as the prime suspect as they have video footage of his affair with Amanda, he was dating a now missing Gloria and he reported finding a third.

Lester has Clay meet him by the lake. He tells him he murdered the nagging Amanda in an attempt to "help" his "fishing buddy", leaving Clay horrified. The next day another body is found, so they drag the lake and find several more.

Clay finally tells the feds all he knows about Lester, but when they enquire at the trucking company they don't know him as he goes by Bobby there. Searching his house, they find a blood-stained knife and put him in jail. There, Lester visits him late without anyone seeing and hints about targeting Kimberly, a young waitress Clay knows.

In the meantime, Lester goes to the local bar and hits on Dale, using the name Lloyd. He's charmed her when Kimberly, who he was waiting for, arrives. They abruptly leave and Dale suddenly realises he is suspicious.

In the police station, Clay easily dupes the deputy, locking him in the cell and getting his car keys. He heads to the lake, where he finds Lester with his intended victim with a knife. As Dale approaches, Kimberly runs by and she searches for Lester in the woods.

Considered cleared of all the charges, Clay packs up his truck as he prepares to leave town. Dale checks in to make sure he doesn't have an inkling of Lester. However, on the road, he follows Clay into a diner. He gives Lester the cold shoulder, and then Clay watches from the diner as he, introducing himself as Lyle, talks a man, who looks like Sheriff Mooney, into taking him along. Two police follow as Clay drives off in the opposite direction.

== Cast ==
- Joaquin Phoenix as Clay Bidwell
- Vince Vaughn as Lester Long
- Janeane Garofalo as Dale Shelby
- Georgina Cates as Amanda
- Gregory Sporleder as Earl
- Phil Morris as Agent Reynard
- Scott Wilson as Sheriff Dan Mooney
- Vince Vieluf as Deputy Barney
- Nikki Arlyn as Gloria Collins
- Joseph D. Reitman as Glen

== Production ==
Clay Pigeons was developed under filmmakers Ridley and Tony Scott's company, Scott Free Productions.

Vaughn has described his character, Lester, as "a guy who isn’t necessarily from the West — that’s just an image he’s created of himself. Whatever his reality is — being badly hurt by women or whatever — he’s made it over, taking bits and pieces of things he’s seen in movies. He sees his life as a strange Western movie, with himself as the hero. He thinks he’s a sane person in an insane world."

Dobkin said of the characters, "I wanted everyone to be different than what they appear to be — the FBI agent who smokes pot, the small town sheriff who seems slow but is the one who figures [the murders] out in the end."

== Reception ==
The film received mixed reviews. On Rotten Tomatoes the film has an approval rating of 61% based on reviews from 54 critics with the consensus: "Joaquin Phoenix, Janeane Garofalo, and Vince Vaughn play for kills in this dark comedy, but the film's aim misses some of those Clay Pigeons." On Metacritic the film has a score of 46/100 based on 26 reviews, indicating "mixed or average" reviews.
