= Touch (1997 film) =

- Theatrical release poster
- Directed by: Paul Schrader
- Screenplay by: Paul Schrader
- Story by: Elmore Leonard
- Based on: Touch by Elmore Leonard
- Starring: Bridget Fonda; Christopher Walken; Skeet Ulrich; Tom Arnold; Gina Gershon; Lolita Davidovich; Paul Mazursky
- Cinematography: Edward Lachman
- Edited by: Cara Silverman
- Music by: Dave Grohl
- Production companies: United Artists; Initial Productions; Lumière International
- Distributed by: MGM Distribution Co.
- Release date: February 14, 1997 (US)
- Running time: 96 minutes
- Country: United States
- Language: English
- Budget: $5.5 million
- Box office: $387,069

Touch is a 1997 American black comedy drama film written and directed by Paul Schrader. It is based on a 1987 novel by Elmore Leonard. It stars Christopher Walken, Richard Schiff, Bridget Fonda, Skeet Ulrich, Tom Arnold, Gina Gershon, Lolita Davidovich, Janeane Garofalo, LL Cool J, and Paul Mazursky. It was shot in Fullerton, California.

== Plot ==
A young man, Juvenal, is apparently able to cure the sick by the laying-on of hands. Mysterious stigmata appear from time to time on his flesh.

The former evangelist Bill Hill, tired of selling mobile homes for a living, persuades his friend Lynn Faulkner to befriend the innocent ex-monk and encourage him to aim for the big-time. But matters become complicated when the young couple falls in love, and even more complicated when fundamentalist August Murray takes exception to their relationship.

== Cast ==
- Skeet Ulrich as Juvenal
- Bridget Fonda as Lynn Faulkner
- Christopher Walken as Bill Hill
- Gina Gershon as Debra Lusanne
- Tom Arnold as August Murray
- Conchata Ferrell as Virginia Worrel
- John Doe as Elwin Worrel
- Janeane Garofalo as Kathy Worthington
- Lolita Davidovitch as Antoinette Baker
- Richard Schiff as Jerry
- Paul Mazursky as Artie
- LL Cool J as himself
- Breckin Meyer as Greg Czarnicki
- Anthony Zerbe as Father Donahue
- Don Novello as Father Navaroli
- Mason Adams as Father Nestor
- O-Lan Jones as Bib Overalls
- Julie Condra as Shelly
- Brent Hinkley as Arnold
- Richard Fancy as Judge
- William Newman as Court Clerk
- Tamlyn Tomita as Prosecutor
- Matt O'Toole as Bailiff

== Soundtrack ==
The soundtrack is composed and recorded by Dave Grohl and released on his Capitol Records imprint, Roswell Records. Nine of the tracks are instrumental. The remaining four tracks feature lyrics. One has Grohl on vocals titled "How Do You Do," another has John Doe on vocals titled "This Loving Thing", and the other two songs titled "Touch" and "Saints in Love" feature vocals from Grohl and Louise Post of Veruca Salt. The release would also mark the first time Grohl used his pseudonym Late, as credited in the liner notes, since the release of Pocketwatch in 1992.

== Reception ==
On the review aggregator website Rotten Tomatoes, 33% of 18 critics' reviews are positive. Metacritic, which uses a weighted average, assigned the film a score of 56 out of 100, based on 14 critics, indicating "mixed or average" reviews.

In a review that awarded 2 and 1/2 stars out of 4, Roger Ebert wrote, "The plot of 'Touch' sounds like a comedy. But the experience of seeing the film is subduing; the movie plays in a muted key. Actors like Tom Arnold, who approach their characters more broadly, sound like they're talking too loudly in church. The dominant tone is set by Skeet Ulrich, as Juvenal: He's sweet, soft-spoken, not sure what it all means. Schrader has said his movie has 'a whole cast of ironic characters, with an existential character in the center.' If the viewer doesn't figure this out, some scenes play very oddly." John Petrakis of the Chicago Tribune labelled the film as "cryptic" in his 1997 review, and praised Ulrich's performance, stating that he "proves as gentle here as he was evil in Scream." Touch was included in Magill's Cinema Annual 1998: A Survey of the Films of 1997, with the book describing the film as "too unconvincing and confused in tone to be truly satisfying."
