= Blood (2022 film) =

2022 horror film by Brad Anderson

- Release poster
- Directed by: Brad Anderson
- Written by: Will Honley
- Produced by: Gary Levinsohn; Billy Hines; Paris Kassidokostas-Latsis; Terry Dougas
- Starring: Michelle Monaghan; Skeet Ulrich
- Cinematography: Björn Charpentier
- Edited by: Robert Mead
- Music by: Matthew Rogers
- Production companies: Hercules Film Fund; H2L Media Group; Rhea Films; 1821 Studios
- Distributed by: Vertical Entertainment
- Release dates: September 5, 2022 (Deauville); January 27, 2023 (United States)
- Running time: 108 minutes
- Country: United States
- Language: English
- Box office: $291,581

Blood is a 2022 American horror film directed by Brad Anderson and written by Will Honley. The film stars Michelle Monaghan and Skeet Ulrich.

The film premiered at the Deauville American Film Festival on September 5, 2022. It was released in theaters on January 27, 2023, by Vertical Entertainment.

== Plot ==
Jess, a recovering addict and nurse, moves with her daughter Tyler and young son Owen back into her old farmhouse after finally regaining custody of her children. Tyler and Owen discover that the nearby lake has completely dried up surrounding a dead tree, save some thick, black mud littered with animal carcasses. The family dog, Pippen, seems simultaneously afraid and drawn to the tree. Some time later, Pippen runs away into the woods. Pippen returns several days later, acting aggressive towards Owen and with a glint in its eyes. When Owen approaches it, the dog savagely mauls him, until Jess manages to kill it. Owen is rushed to the hospital and put into a medically induced coma.

When Owen wakes, he refuses to eat, claiming the food smells weird. When Jess leaves him alone, he has a seizure, leading doctors to suspect he contracted a pathogen from Pippen. Afterwards, Jess discovers Owen drinking blood directly from his IV bag; she frantically takes it away from him, but is shocked to see him make a miraculous recovery. Later, Owen begs his mother for more blood, claiming he needs it. Jess refuses, but relents after Owen's condition takes a turn for the worse. She begins stealing plasma from her hospital and feeding it to Owen in secret.

Owen is eventually discharged for home care, but he begins acting strangely. He requests his blood to be warm, and when Jess' hospital notices the stolen plasma, she runs out of supply. She attempts to satiate Owen's hunger with animal blood, but finds that only human blood treats his symptoms. She begins feeding him her own blood, gradually becoming anemic, leading to Jess' ex-husband, Patrick, to suspect she has resumed her drug use.

Meanwhile, Jess has been treating a terminally ill woman, Helen, who expresses a wish to die rather than endure the intrusive treatments she receives. When she is discharged, Jess offers her a ride before drugging and kidnapping her. She ties Helen up in the basement and explains she plans to use her blood to treat Owen's illness. Owen's condition gradually worsens, his skin grows paler, his eyes begin to glow in the dark, and he demands larger and larger quantities of blood.

Tyler discovers Helen, but Jess convinces her to keep quiet. Later, Helen manages to escape, but slices her neck open on barbed wire outside the property. Owen finds her and feeds on her, even showing aggression towards his mother when she attempts to stop him, much to Jess' horror. Tyler begins to grow concerned about Owen's behavior, and investigates the dead tree. There, she hears whispers emerging from the hole in the wood. Jess resumes feeding Owen her own blood, but finds that his thirst is almost unquenchable.

Patrick arrives with child protective services, believing Jess has been using again and neglecting the children. Owen, in a trance, nearly attacks his father's new infant son, but is stopped by Tyler. Realizing his condition is worsening, Tyler and Owen bike away, while Owen is forced to wear a hood to protect himself from a sudden sensitivity to light. Tyler attempts to head to the tree in order to destroy it, and by extension whatever it has done to her brother, but Owen suddenly becomes more monstrous, and attacks her. Tyler runs to the tree, and Owen nearly feasts on her, but Jess arrives at the last moment and intervenes.

Owen attempts to attack his mother, and Tyler tells her mother that the monster isn't Owen anymore. Jess tries to find a way out, but Owen, in a moment of lucidity, tells her to do what is right before finally succumbing to his illness. Owen fully transforms into a vampire, and Jess drowns him in the thick mud around the tree. Owen's death is made to look like an accident, and Jess loses custody of Tyler. During one of her visits, Tyler tells her mother never to doubt what she did. Later on, Jess burns down the dead tree.

Later on during an evening, Jess has a new dog, Jericho, which she is playing with in the front yard in the same way Owen played with Pippin. Throwing the ball too far, Jericho stops abruptly while going for the ball, and appears to be staring at something unseen, deep in the woods, in the same direction of where the tree was from her house.

== Cast ==
- Michelle Monaghan as Jess
- Skeet Ulrich as Patrick
- Finlay Wojtak-Hissong as Owen
- June B. Wilde as Helen
- Jennifer Rose Garcia as Candice
- Skylar Morgan Jones as Tyler
- Danika Frederick as Shelly
- Sarah Constible as Dr. Avery
- Erik Athavale as Dr. Forsythe
- Candice Smith as Regina White

== Production ==
In September 2020, it was announced that the film would be directed by Brad Anderson and star Michelle Monaghan. In October 2020, Skeet Ulrich joined the cast.

Filming took place from October 14 to November 14, 2020, in Winnipeg, Manitoba, Canada.

== Release ==
In September 2022, Vertical Entertainment acquired the film's North American and UK distribution rights. The film had its premiere at the Deauville American Film Festival on September 5, 2022. It was released in theaters on January 27, 2023, and on video on demand on January 31.

== Reception ==
On Rotten Tomatoes, the film holds an approval rating of 58% based on 31 reviews, with an average rating of 6.0/10. The site's consensus reads: "Blood has a handful of solid scares, but a narrative that fails to truly coagulate makes this half-empty vial of vampire horror difficult to recommend." On Metacritic, the film has a weighted average score of 55 out of 100 based on seven critics, indicating "mixed or average" reviews.
