= A Soldier's Sweetheart =

- Film poster
- Written by: Tim O'Brien; Thomas Michael Donnelly
- Directed by: Thomas Michael Donnelly
- Starring: Kiefer Sutherland; Skeet Ulrich; Georgina Cates
- Music by: Gary Chang
- Original language: English

Production
- Executive producer: Marianne Moloney
- Producer: William S. Gilmore
- Cinematography: Jacek Laskus
- Editor: Anthony Sherin
- Running time: 112 minutes
- Production companies: Showtime Networks; Moloney/Donnelly Productions

Original release
- Network: Showtime
- Release: November 8, 1998

A Soldier's Sweetheart is a 1998 television film directed by Thomas Michael Donnelly and starring Kiefer Sutherland, Skeet Ulrich, and Georgina Cates. It is based on a short story by Tim O'Brien, "Sweetheart of the Song Tra Bong." The story was part of his book, The Things They Carried (1990).

== Cast ==
- Kiefer Sutherland as Bob "Rat" Kiley
- Skeet Ulrich as Mark Fossie
- Georgina Cates as Marianne Bell
- Daniel London as Eddie Diamond
- Louis Vanaria as Bobbie "Bobbie D"
- Lawrence Gilliard, Jr. as "Shoeshine"
- Christopher Birt as Lieutenant Mitchell Sanders
- Tony Billy as Soldier #2

== Production ==
The film was shot in New Zealand, at Studio West in West Auckland.

== Release ==
The film is only available on VHS, and a petition has been set up at IMDb urging the companies that own the rights to the film to consider reissuing it in DVD format. It was also premiered at the Seattle International Film Festival in 1998. The film received a theatrical release in Belgium in 2010.

== Reception ==
Bob Batz from Dayton Daily News gave A Soldier's Sweetheart a very positive review, stating: "The film, based on Tim O'Brien's award-winning short story Sweetheart of the Song Tra Bong, is a brutal, often bloody story of the Vietnam War and how it changed many of the men - and women - who were part of it. It is filled with excellent dialogue and has enough plot twists to keep viewers riveted to their easy chairs for the entire two hours."

Ken Eisner from Variety magazine also gave the film a good review, concluding: "Just when you think all the basic Vietnam stories have been told, helmer Thomas Michael Donnelly puts a new spin on America's lost cause by viewing it from a female angle. Striving for mythic levels — although there's plenty of scary grit to it — "A Soldier's Sweetheart" taps into an aspect of warfare that transcends gender. Subject, then, is a difficult one, but extremely well-mounted pic could resonate with women if Paramount can find a way to package it for theatrical release".

A Soldier's Sweetheart was nominated for two awards. One Primetime Emmy Awards for "Outstanding Sound Editing for a Miniseries, Movie or a Special" and one Golden Reel Awards for "Best Sound Editing - Television Movies of the Week - Dialogue & ADR".

== See also ==
- Unreliable narrator
