= The Magic of Ordinary Days =

- Genre: Period romance
- Created by: Hallmark Hall of Fame
- Based on: The Magic of Ordinary Days by Ann Howard Creel
- Screenplay by: Camille Thomasson
- Directed by: Brent Shields
- Starring: Keri Russell; Skeet Ulrich; Mare Winningham
- Country of origin: United States
- Original language: English

Production
- Executive producer: Richard Welsh
- Producers: Andrew Gottlieb; Jim O'Grady
- Cinematography: Eric van Haren Noman
- Editor: Michael D. Ornstein
- Running time: 98 minutes
- Production company: Empire International Pictures

Original release
- Network: CBS; Hallmark
- Release: January 30, 2005

The Magic of Ordinary Days is a Hallmark Hall of Fame production based on a novel of the same name by Ann Howard Creel and adapted as a teleplay by Camille Thomasson. It was directed by Brent Shields, produced by Andrew Gottlieb and stars Keri Russell, Skeet Ulrich, and Mare Winningham.

The film first aired on CBS on January 30, 2005, and received an encore broadcast on the same network exactly five years later.

== Plot ==
During World War II, Olivia "Livy" Dunne, a Denver minister's daughter, is pregnant by a United States Navy flight instructor on furlough. To cover up his daughter's unwed pregnancy, her father quietly compels the reluctant Livy to marry, arranging with another minister to find a suitable willing husband.

Hearing of Livy's dilemma, Ray Singleton agrees to marry without having met her. Though young, personable, and a family man, Ray has little opportunity to find a wife in a remote southeastern Colorado farming region where young women are scarce. Ray lost both his parents prior to the war and his younger brother, Daniel, during the attack on Pearl Harbor.

Having studied archaeology in graduate school, Livy had aspirations to travel and is bored with farm talk around crops and the weather. A man of few words, Ray is a hard worker, kind, honest and patient, whose daily activity is focused on working his ancestral farm. Learning of her graduate treatise on Heinrich Schliemann, the eager-to-please Ray checks out a book on Schliemann from the local library. Livy finds native American arrowheads among Ray’s grandparents’ former belongings.

Livy secretly writes several letters to Lieutenant Edward Brown, her baby's father, but receives no response. A visit by her sister further complicates matters. With her husband in the military, her lonely sister wants Livy to leave Ray, suggesting they make up stories of her husband’s drunken violent nature to justify the separation. Livy cannot do this, as Ray is a good man.

As most young men are at war, Ray's farm is supplemented by Japanese-American internees from nearby Camp Amache. Feeling isolated, Livy befriends two sisters from the camp, Florence and Rose Umahara, both college students before being interned, finding intellectual stimulation and comfort in their friendship.

A letter finally arrives from Lt. Brown, which Ray picks up during a routine post office run. Upset that Livy has furtively contacted the lieutenant, Ray goes off for the evening to reflect. In the letter, Lt. Brown insists he couldn't be her baby’s father. Distraught, Livy confides in Ray’s married sister, Martha, a neighbor. Remaining unjudgmental, Martha affirms to Livy how much Ray loves her, but she advises Livy to leave quickly if determined to go. Believing she has decided to leave, Ray tells Livy he loves her and gives her his mother's wedding ring, saying that he knows she will be happy one day when she forgives herself. Livy affirms at the family Thanksgiving gathering that she has learned from them what unconditional love is.

Florence Umahara informs Livy that her secret boyfriend, Walter, is an MP guard of the German POWs. She wants Livy to meet him and asks her to take them on a drive southward to enjoy a day away from the camp. Upon meeting Walter, Livy realizes by his accent that he is a German POW wearing an MP uniform that Florence, an expert seamstress, made for him to pass as American. Livy tells Florence that she and her sister could be charged with treason if she is caught helping a German POW escape across the border. Dropping off the sisters close to camp, Livy drives Walter to her home, instructing him to change his uniform with Ray's clothing. She then deliberately leaves the keys by the door, enabling him to steal her truck and drive off. The truck’s broken gas gauge reads full; Livy knows the nearly empty tank will quickly run out of gas, stranding him.

Once Walter leaves, Livy quickly phones the police to report her truck stolen by a German POW. She also asks for a doctor, having begun labor. Burning the MP uniform evidence, Livy tosses a locket with Lt. Brown's photo into the fire. As she watches the uniform burn, Ray arrives, and she tells him she is in labor.

After Livy gives birth to a boy, Livy and Ray share a tender kiss, finally recognizing that they are in love with each other. In the final scene Livy holds hands with Ray as he carries little Daniel out of their house on their first archaeological dig on their farm as a family.

== Cast ==
- Keri Russell as Olivia "Livy" Dunne-Singleton
- Skeet Ulrich as Ray Singleton
- Mare Winningham as Martha
- Tania Gunadi as Florence
- Gwendoline Yeo as Rose
- Steve Strachan as Hank
- Katie Keating as Ruth
- Ken Pogue as Reverend Case
- Eric Winter as Walter
- Jane McGregor as Abby
- Daryl Shuttleworth as Reverend Dunne
- Brayden Bullen as Hank Jr.
- Sam Dyer as Chester
- Mary Black as Marian Case
- Jackie Robbins as Mrs. Pratt
- Joyce Robbins as Mrs. Parker
- Karl Roth as Slim
- Andy Maton as Dr. McCutcheon
- Roger Haskett as Telephone Man
- Kira Bradley as Librarian
- Tom Carey as Shop Keeper
- Calvin Vollrath as Fiddler at Dance (uncredited)

== Reception ==
The premiere broadcast on CBS in 2005 attracted 18.7 million viewers, making it the highest-rated television film since the 2001-02 season. According to the author of the original novel, "as of early 2009, the screenplay for a sequel has been written and approved. Hallmark Hall of Fame is waiting for principal actors to become available to begin production and filming."

In 2005, Robert Bianco of USA Today gave the film (3½ out of 4 stars), saying:

If only TV movies this good were ordinary events ... Days does sometimes stress a link between "country" and "uncomplicated" that probably never existed. But underneath the contrasts between Ray's simple ways and Livvy's more cultured upbringing is a binding, universal message about the need to accept the consequences of our acts. An ordinary lesson, perhaps, but it takes an extraordinary movie to make us listen.
