= Sin City (soundtrack) =

2005 soundtrack album

Sin City: Original Motion Picture Soundtrack

Soundtrack album by Various Artists
- Released: March 29, 2005
- Genre: Soundtrack
- Length: 58:14
- Label: Varèse Sarabande

Professional ratings
Review scores
Source	Rating
AllMusic	4.5/5 stars
Filmtracks.com	4/5 stars
SoundtrackNet	4/5 stars

"Tar Pit"
In this track from the score of Sin City (2005), composer John Debney employs solo saxophone and trumpet over orchestral strings, evoking a classic noir sound.

Sin City: Original Motion Picture Soundtrack is the soundtrack to the 2005 film Sin City. It features music composed by Robert Rodriguez, John Debney and Graeme Revell, performed by the Hollywood Studio Symphony, as well as the orchestral track "Sensemayá" from Mexican composer Silvestre Revueltas and the electronica piece "Absurd" by Fluke.

== Composers' approach ==
Because the film is based on different comic book stories (written by Frank Miller), each composer was assigned to score a different story. Revell scored the music to The Hard Goodbye (Rodriguez co-scored for tracks four, six and eight); Debney scored The Big Fat Kill (Rodriguez co-scored tracks eleven and twelve); Rodriguez scored That Yellow Bastard as well as the opening credits sequence and the first track in the end credits.

== Miscellaneous music ==
The song featured in the trailers and television spots was an instrumental version of the song "Cells" by The Servant and briefly appeared in the movie as a sample.

The Japanese theme for the movie is "Violet Sauce" by Namie Amuro.

== Track listing ==
No.	Song	Artist(s)
1	Sin City	Rodriguez
2	One Hour to Go	Rodriguez
3	Goldie's Dead	Revell
4	Marv	Revell, Rodriguez
5	Bury the Hatchet	Revell
6	Old Town Girls	Revell, Rodriguez
7	The Hard Goodbye	Revell
8	Cardinal Sin	Revell, Rodriguez
9	Her Name is Goldie	Revell
10	Dwight	Debney
11	Old Town	Debney, Rodriguez
12	Deadly Little Miho	Debney, Rodriguez
13	Warrior Woman	Debney
14	Tar Pit	Debney
15	Jackie Boy's Head	Debney
16	The Big Fat Kill	Debney
17	Nancy	Rodriguez
18	Prison Cell	Rodriguez
19	Absurd	Fluke
20	Kiss of Death	Rodriguez
21	That Yellow Bastard	Rodriguez
22	Hartigan	Rodriguez
23	Sensemaya	Revueltas
24	Sin City End Titles	Rodriguez

== Credits ==
- Executive Producer: Robert Townson
- Conducted by John Debney
- Score Recorded at Todd-AO Scoring, Studio City, CA
- Score Mixed at Media Ventures, Santa Monica, CA
- Score Recorded and Mixed by Alan Meyerson
- Additional Conducting: Bruce Babcock
- Electronic Score Engineer: Wolfgang Amadeus
- Music Score Coordinator: Lola Debney
- Performed by The Hollywood Studio Symphony
- Package Design by Matthew Joseph Peak / SoundChaser Studios
- Saxophone solo: Dan Higgins
- Trumpet solo: Dan Savant
- Tenor Sax (traks 1,2 & 4): Johnny Reno
- Upright Bass solos: Mike Valerio

== Instrumentation ==
- Strings: 30 violins, 18 violas, 12 violoncellos, 8 double basses
- Brass: 4 horns, 3 trumpets, 3 trombones, tuba, alto & bass saxophones

== Reviews ==
Jerry McCulley of Amazon.com says, "While their largely synth-driven cues tend naturally towards brooding atmospheric soundscapes, their tense electro-rhythms are seasoned with bracing doses of sinewy, sensual sax and dotted with the occasional bongo flourish, details that musically evoke both a shadowy humanity and the film's genre-savvy roots."

Mike Brennan of SoundtrackNet gives it four stars saying, "While each composer brings a different style and feel to the film, the rough saxophone and sorrowful trumpet and vocal solos maintain a soundscape that keeps the film one entity rather than three separate stories. Behind a groundbreaking visual piece is also a unique musical journey that truly takes the listener into the world of Sin City."

Christian Clemmensen of Filmtracks.com said, "Sin City is a decent score with an excellent rendering. No single element will blow you away (other than that final Debney cue), but its whole is surprisingly organic and pulpy."
