= Keri Russell =

American actress (born 1976)

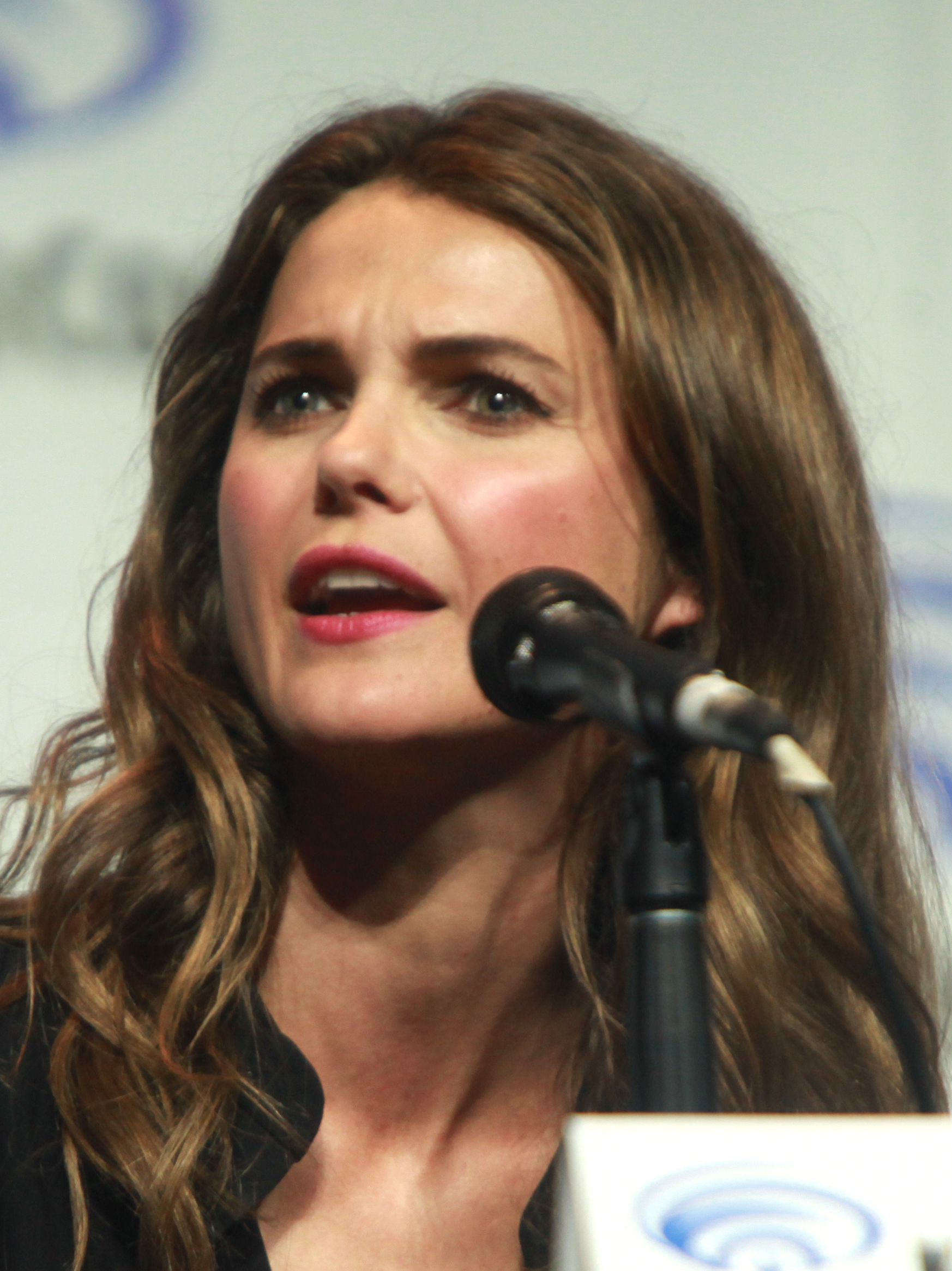
- Russell in 2014
- Born: Keri Lynn Russell; March 23, 1976 (age 50); Fountain Valley, California, U.S.
- Occupation: Actress
- Years active: 1991–present
- Spouse: Shane Deary (m. 2007; div. 2014)
- Partner: Matthew Rhys (2014–present)
- Children: 3

Keri Lynn Russell (born March 23, 1976) is an American actress. Working mainly in dramatic television since the 1990s, she has received eight nominations for the Critics' Choice Television Award for Best Actress in a Drama Series. She won a Golden Globe Award in 1999 for her lead role in the drama series Felicity, and has received eight Primetime Emmy Award nominations and four additional Golden Globe Award nominations for her roles in The Americans and The Diplomat. In 2017, she was honored with a star on the Hollywood Walk of Fame for her contributions to television.

Russell first appeared on Disney Channel's revival of The Mickey Mouse Club when she was 15 and was a regular cast member on the show from 1991 to 1994. She made her first film appearance in Honey, I Blew Up the Kid (1992). Russell's other film appearances include We Were Soldiers (2002), Mission: Impossible III (2006), Waitress (2007), Dawn of the Planet of the Apes (2014), and Star Wars: The Rise of Skywalker (2019).

On stage, she acted in Neil LaBute's off-Broadway play Fat Pig (2004–2005) and made her Broadway debut in the Lanford Wilson revival Burn This (2019).

== Early life ==
Russell was born March 23, 1976, in Fountain Valley, California, a suburb of Los Angeles in Orange County. Her mother, Stephanie Stephens, is a homemaker, and her father, David Russell, is a Nissan Motors executive. She has an older brother and a younger sister. The family moved frequently due to her father's work, living in Coppell, Texas; Mesa, Arizona; and Highlands Ranch, Colorado.

== Career ==
=== 1990–2002: Early roles and rise to prominence with Felicity ===
Russell danced in middle school and high school, and her dancing during her audition had helped her get cast on The All New Mickey Mouse Club television show on the Disney Channel. Russell was on the show from 1991 to 1994, encompassing seasons four to six.

In 1992, she appeared in Honey, I Blew Up the Kid and in 1993, had a minor role on the sitcom Boy Meets World as Mr. Feeny's niece. She appeared on Married... with Children in a 1995 episode ("Radio Free Trumaine", production 9.24). She subsequently had several film and television roles, including the 1996 made-for-television film The Babysitter's Seduction. That year she also had a role on the short-lived soap opera series Malibu Shores. In 1994, Russell appeared as the "other woman" in Bon Jovi's music video "Always". In 1997, she appeared in two episodes of Roar.

From 1998 to 2002, Russell starred as the title character on the WB series Felicity, and in 1999 won a Golden Globe for the role. During the show's run, Russell appeared in the films Eight Days a Week, The Curve, and Mad About Mambo, all of which received only limited releases in North America. Her next role was in the film We Were Soldiers (2002), as the wife of a United States serviceman during the Vietnam War. The film was released two months before the end of Felicity's run.

=== 2003–2012: Theater and film roles ===
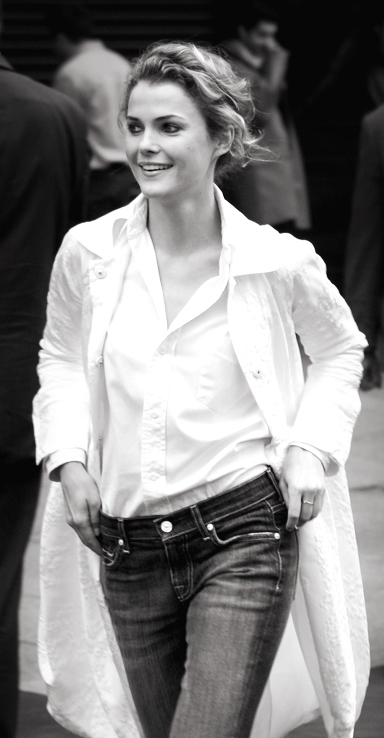
Russell at the British premiere of Mission: Impossible III, 2006

When Felicity ended, Russell moved to New York City and made her off-Broadway stage debut in 2004 in Neil LaBute's Fat Pig. In 2005, she returned to television and film, beginning with an appearance in the Hallmark Hall of Fame television movie The Magic of Ordinary Days, the theatrical film The Upside of Anger, and the television miniseries Into the West. In 2005, director J. J. Abrams asked Russell to join the cast of Mission: Impossible III, and she accepted. She was screen tested for the role of Lois Lane in Superman Returns but lost the part to Kate Bosworth.

In mid-2006, Russell was chosen to be a celebrity spokeswoman for CoverGirl cosmetics. In the summer of 2007, Russell appeared in The Keri Kronicles, a reality show sitcom sponsored by CoverGirl that aired on MySpace; the show was filmed at Russell's home in Manhattan and spotlighted her life. Also in 2007, she played Melody on the NBC show Scrubs.

Russell next starred in the film Waitress, which marked the fourth time she played a pregnant woman. Her performance was positively received by critics, with Michael Sragow of The Baltimore Sun writing that Russell's performance had "aesthetic character" and "wields tenderness and fierceness with quiet heat". In 2007, Russell also completed roles in Grimm Love and The Girl in the Park.

Russell next appeared in August Rush, released in November 2007. She later appeared in Bedtime Stories. In an appearance on The View on December 15, 2008, Russell said she got the part because Adam Sandler's wife Jackie had seen her in Waitress and suggested her for the movie. Russell voiced Wonder Woman in a direct-to-video animated feature released on March 3, 2009.

Russell starred in the Tom Vaughan-helmed Extraordinary Measures for CBS Films. The drama, released on January 22, 2010, was the company's first film to go into production. Russell plays Aileen Crowley, a mother who tries to build a normal home life for her sick children while her husband and an unconventional scientist race against time to find a cure.

Russell starred in the Fox series Running Wilde from 2010 to 2011.

=== 2013–present: The Americans and The Diplomat ===
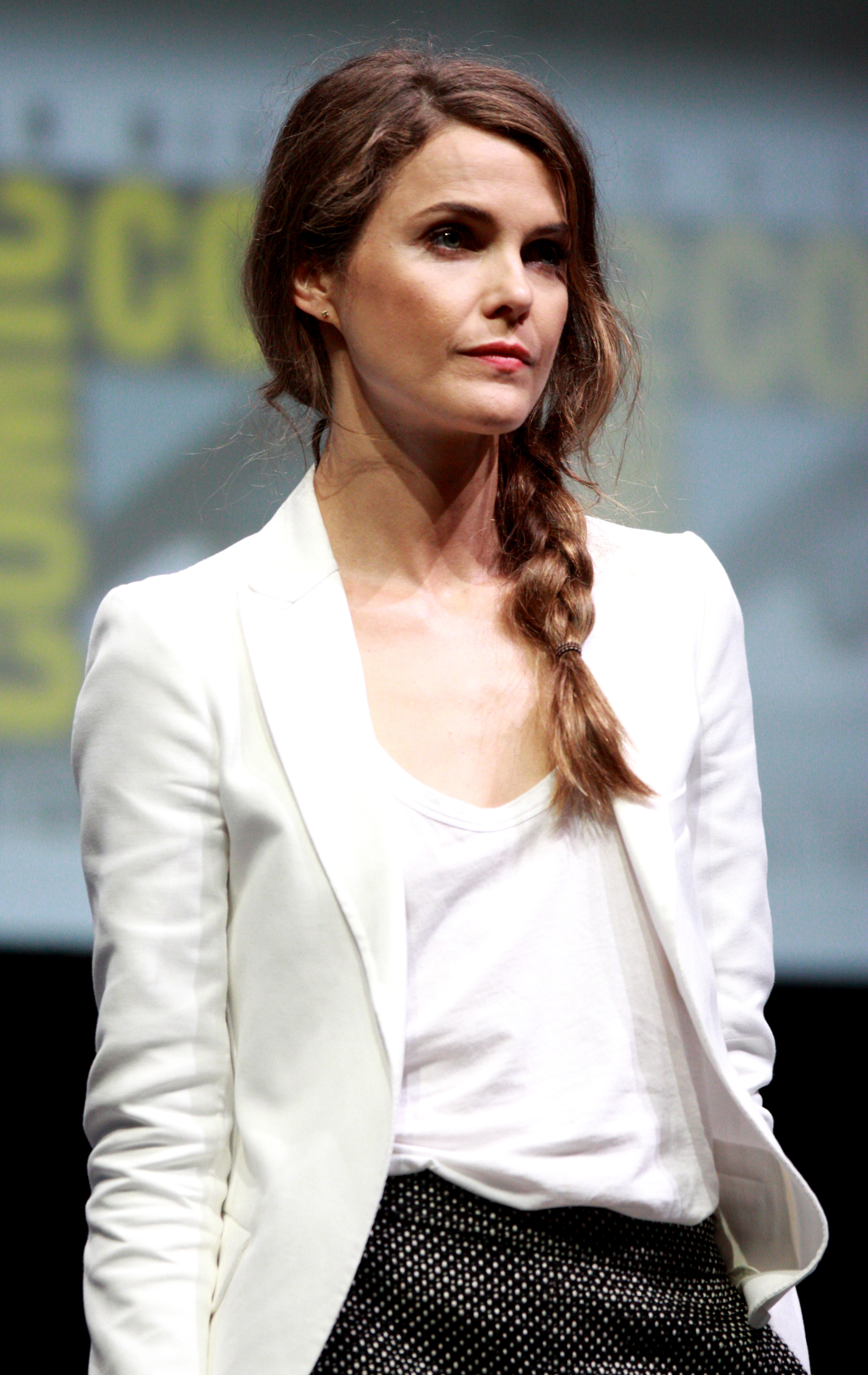
Russell at the 2013 San Diego Comic-Con

From 2013 to 2018, Russell starred in the FX drama series The Americans, playing Elizabeth Jennings, a deep-undercover Russian KGB spy living as an American in the 1980s Cold War era. She appeared opposite Matthew Rhys, who portrays her character's husband and spy partner. Russell and Rhys became partners in real life during this time. The series ended after six seasons. For her performance, she was nominated for three consecutive Primetime Emmy Award for Outstanding Lead Actress in a Drama Series, as well as two Golden Globe Award for Best Actress – Television Series Drama. Emily St. James of Vox called her performance "gorgeously restrained".

In 2013, Russell starred in the science-fiction horror film Dark Skies and the romantic comedy film Austenland. In 2014, she starred in the science fiction action film Dawn of the Planet of the Apes, a sequel to 2011's Rise of the Planet of the Apes. In 2016, she starred as Serena Knight in the historical U.S. Civil War film Free State of Jones.

In 2017, Russell received a star on the Hollywood Walk of Fame. In 2018, Russell was announced to have joined the cast of the film Star Wars: The Rise of Skywalker, which was released on December 20, 2019. The film reunited her with J.J. Abrams, with whom she had worked on Felicity and Mission: Impossible III.

In March 2019, she starred in the first Broadway revival of Lanford Wilson's play Burn This at the Hudson Theatre. Frank Rizzo of Variety wrote of her performance, "Russell, whose stage credits are slim but who's proven her chops onscreen in The Americans, creates a vivid, if less flashy, performance", adding, "Still, she's a force in her own right."

In 2023, Russell began starring in The Diplomat, a political series on Netflix from writer and producer Debora Cahn. In 2026, she received the Actor Award for Outstanding Performance by a Female Actor in a Drama Series for her work on the show's third season.

== Personal life ==
In 2006, Russell became engaged to Shane Deary, a Brooklyn-based contractor she met through mutual friends. They married in New York on February 14, 2007. They have two children: a son born in 2007 and a daughter born in 2012. Russell and Deary separated in early 2013 and divorced in mid-2014. Since 2014, she has been in a relationship with actor Matthew Rhys, her co-star in The Americans. They have a son, born in 2016. In interviews conducted in 2021, Russell and Rhys referred to each other as husband and wife, although in an interview in 2025, Rhys said: "We literally haven't got round to marriage yet".

== Acting credits ==
=== Film ===
| Year | Title | Role | Notes |
|---|---|---|---|
| 1992 | Honey, I Blew Up the Kid | Mandy Park | |
| 1998 | The Curve | Emma | Also known as Dead Man's Curve |
| 1999 | Eight Days a Week | Erica | |
| 2000 | Mad About Mambo | Lucy McLoughlin | |
| 2002 | We Were Soldiers | Barbara Geoghegan | |
| 2005 | The Upside of Anger | Emily Wolfmeyer | |
| 2006 | Grimm Love | Katie | |
| 2006 | Mission: Impossible III | Lindsey Farris | |
| 2007 | August Rush | Lyla Novacek | |
| 2007 | The Girl in the Park | Celeste | |
| 2007 | Waitress | Jenna Hunterson | |
| 2008 | Bedtime Stories | Jill Hastings | |
| 2009 | Leaves of Grass | Janet | |
| 2009 | Wonder Woman | Diana Prince / Wonder Woman (voice) | Direct-to-video film |
| 2010 | Extraordinary Measures | Aileen Crowley | |
| 2012 | Goats | Judy | |
| 2013 | Austenland | Jane Hayes | |
| 2013 | Dark Skies | Lacy Barrett | |
| 2014 | Dawn of the Planet of the Apes | Ellie | |
| 2016 | Free State of Jones | Serena Knight | |
| 2019 | Star Wars: The Rise of Skywalker | Zorii Bliss | |
| 2021 | Antlers | Julia Meadows | |
| 2021 | Adrienne | Herself | Documentary film |
| 2023 | Cocaine Bear | Sari | |

=== Television ===
| Year | Title | Role | Notes |
|---|---|---|---|
| 1991–1993 | The All New Mickey Mouse Club | Herself | Main role |
| 1993 | Boy Meets World | Jessica | Episode: "Grandma Was a Rolling Stone" |
| 1994 | Daddy's Girls | Phoebe Walker | 3 episodes |
| 1995 | Clerks | Sandra | Television pilot |
| 1995 | Married... with Children | April Adams | Episode: "Radio Free Trumaine" |
| 1996 | The Babysitter's Seduction | Michelle Winston | Television film |
| 1996 | The Lottery | Felice Dunbar | Television film |
| 1996 | Malibu Shores | Chloe Walker | Main role |
| 1997 | Roar | Claire | 2 episodes |
| 1997 | 7^{th} Heaven | Camille | Episode: "Choices" |
| 1997 | When Innocence Is Lost | Erica French | Television film |
| 1998–2002 | Felicity | Felicity Porter | Main role |
| 2000 | CinderElmo | Princess | Television film |
| 2005 | Into the West | Naomi Wheeler | Episode: "Manifest Destiny" |
| 2005 | The Magic of Ordinary Days | Olivia "Livy" Dunne | Television film |
| 2007 | Scrubs | Melody O'Harra | 2 episodes |
| 2010–2011 | Running Wilde | Emmy Kadubic | Main role |
| 2013 | Arrested Development | Widow Carr (voice) | Episode: "Señoritis" |
| 2013–2018 | The Americans | Elizabeth Jennings | Main role |
| 2017 | Secret History of Comics | Narrator | Episode: "The Truth About Wonder Woman" |
| 2018 | Running Wild with Bear Grylls | Herself | Episode: "Canary Islands" |
| 2021 | Explained | Narrator | Episode: "Sugar" |
| 2023 | Extrapolations | Olivia Drew | Episode: "2,059 Part II: Nightbirds" |
| 2023–present | The Diplomat | Kate Wyler | Main role; also executive producer |

=== Theater ===
| Year | Title | Role | Venue | Ref. |
|---|---|---|---|---|
| 2004–2005 | Fat Pig | Jeannie | Lucille Lortel Theatre, Off-Broadway | |
| 2019 | Burn This | Anna Mann | Hudson Theatre, Broadway | |

=== Music videos ===
| Year | Song | Artist |
|---|---|---|
| 1994 | "Always" | Bon Jovi |

=== Video games ===
| Year | Title | Role | Notes |
|---|---|---|---|
| 2024 | Open Roads | Opal Devine (voice) | |

== Awards and nominations ==
| Year (Note: Where available, the "Year" value is linked to the specific ceremony.) | Award | Category | Nominated work | Result | Ref. |
|---|---|---|---|---|---|
| 1993 | Young Artist Awards | Best Young Actress Co-Starring in a Motion Picture | Honey, I Blew Up the Kid | Nominated | |
| 1993 | Young Artist Awards | Outstanding Young Ensemble Cast in a Youth Series or Variety Show | The All New Mickey Mouse Club | Nominated | |
| 1999 | Golden Globe Awards | Best Actress in a Television Series – Drama | Felicity | Won | |
| 1999 | Teen Choice Awards | Choice TV Actress | Felicity | Nominated | |
| 1999 | Teen Choice Awards | Choice Breakout TV Star | Felicity | Won | |
| 2000 | Teen Choice Awards | Choice TV Actress | Felicity | Nominated | |
| 2001 | Teen Choice Awards | Choice TV Actress | Felicity | Nominated | |
| 2002 | Teen Choice Awards | Choice TV Actress - Drama | Felicity | Nominated | |
| 2005 | Satellite Awards | Best Actress – Miniseries or Television Film | The Magic of Ordinary Days | Nominated | |
| 2006 | Teen Choice Awards | Choice Movie Actress: Drama/Action Adventure | Mission: Impossible III | Nominated | |
| 2007 | Alliance of Women Film Journalists | Best Breakthrough Performance | Waitress / August Rush | Nominated | |
| 2007 | Alliance of Women Film Journalists | Best Seduction (shared with Nathan Fillion) | Waitress | Nominated | |
| 2008 | Teen Choice Awards | Choice Movie Actress: Drama | August Rush | Nominated | |
| 2013 | Critics' Choice Television Awards | Best Actress in a Drama Series | The Americans | Nominated | |
| 2013 | Women's Image Network Awards | Outstanding Actress Drama Series | The Americans | Nominated | |
| 2014 | Satellite Awards | Best Actress in a Television Series – Drama | The Americans | Nominated | |
| 2014 | Saturn Awards | Best Actress on Television | The Americans | Nominated | |
| 2014 | Critics' Choice Television Awards | Best Actress in a Drama Series | The Americans | Nominated | |
| 2015 | Satellite Awards | Best Actress in a Television Series – Drama | The Americans | Won | |
| 2015 | Critics' Choice Television Awards | Best Actress in a Drama Series | The Americans | Nominated | |
| 2016 | Television Critics Association Awards | Individual Achievement in Drama | The Americans | Nominated | |
| 2016 | Primetime Emmy Awards | Outstanding Lead Actress in a Drama Series | The Americans | Nominated | |
| 2016 | Critics' Choice Television Awards | Best Actress in a Drama Series | The Americans | Nominated | |
| 2017 | Golden Globe Awards | Best Actress in a Television Series – Drama | The Americans | Nominated | |
| 2017 | People's Choice Awards | Favorite Cable TV Actress | The Americans | Nominated | |
| 2017 | Hollywood Walk of Fame | Television Star | — | Honored | |
| 2017 | Primetime Emmy Awards | Outstanding Lead Actress in a Drama Series | The Americans | Nominated | |
| 2018 | Television Critics Association Awards | Individual Achievement in Drama | The Americans | Won | |
| 2018 | Primetime Emmy Awards | Outstanding Lead Actress in a Drama Series | The Americans | Nominated | |
| 2019 | Critics' Choice Television Awards | Best Actress in a Drama Series | The Americans | Nominated | |
| 2019 | Golden Globe Awards | Best Actress in a Television Series – Drama | The Americans | Nominated | |
| 2019 | Satellite Awards | Best Actress in a Television Series – Drama | The Americans | Nominated | |
| 2019 | Actor Awards | Outstanding Performance by an Ensemble in a Drama Series | The Americans | Nominated | |
| 2024 | Astra TV Awards | Best Actress in a Streaming Series, Drama | The Diplomat | Won | |
| 2024 | Critics' Choice Television Awards | Best Actress in a Drama Series | The Diplomat | Nominated | |
| 2024 | Golden Globe Awards | Best Actress in a Television Series – Drama | The Diplomat | Nominated | |
| 2024 | Primetime Emmy Awards | Outstanding Lead Actress in a Drama Series | The Diplomat | Nominated | |
| 2024 | Actor Awards | Outstanding Performance by a Female Actor in a Drama Series | The Diplomat | Nominated | |
| 2025 | Astra TV Awards | Best Actress in a Drama Series | The Diplomat | Nominated | |
| 2025 | Critics' Choice Television Awards | Best Actress in a Drama Series | The Diplomat | Nominated | |
| 2025 | Golden Globe Awards | Best Actress in a Television Series – Drama | The Diplomat | Nominated | |
| 2025 | Primetime Emmy Awards | Outstanding Lead Actress in a Drama Series | The Diplomat | Nominated | |
| 2025 | Primetime Emmy Awards | Outstanding Drama Series (as an executive producer) | The Diplomat | Nominated | |
| 2025 | Satellite Awards | Best Actress in a Television Series – Drama | The Diplomat | Nominated | |
| 2025 | Screen Actors Guild Awards | Outstanding Performance by an Ensemble in a Drama Series | The Diplomat | Nominated | |
| 2025 | Screen Actors Guild Awards | Outstanding Performance by a Female Actor in a Drama Series | The Diplomat | Nominated | |
| 2026 | Golden Globe Awards | Best Actress in a Television Series – Drama | The Diplomat | Nominated | |
| 2026 | Actor Awards (Note: Previously known as the Screen Actors Guild Awards) | Outstanding Performance by an Ensemble in a Drama Series | The Diplomat | Nominated | |
| 2026 | Actor Awards | Outstanding Performance by a Female Actor in a Drama Series | The Diplomat | Won | |
| 2026 | Primetime Emmy Awards | Outstanding Lead Actress in a Drama Series | The Diplomat | Nominated | |
| 2026 | Primetime Emmy Awards | Outstanding Drama Series (as an executive producer) | The Diplomat | Nominated | |

== Notes ==
| Preceded by Lucy Lawless (2008) | Voice of Wonder Woman; 2009 | Succeeded by Vanessa Marshall |
