= Eric Womack =

American actor and producer

Eric Womack is an American actor and producer.

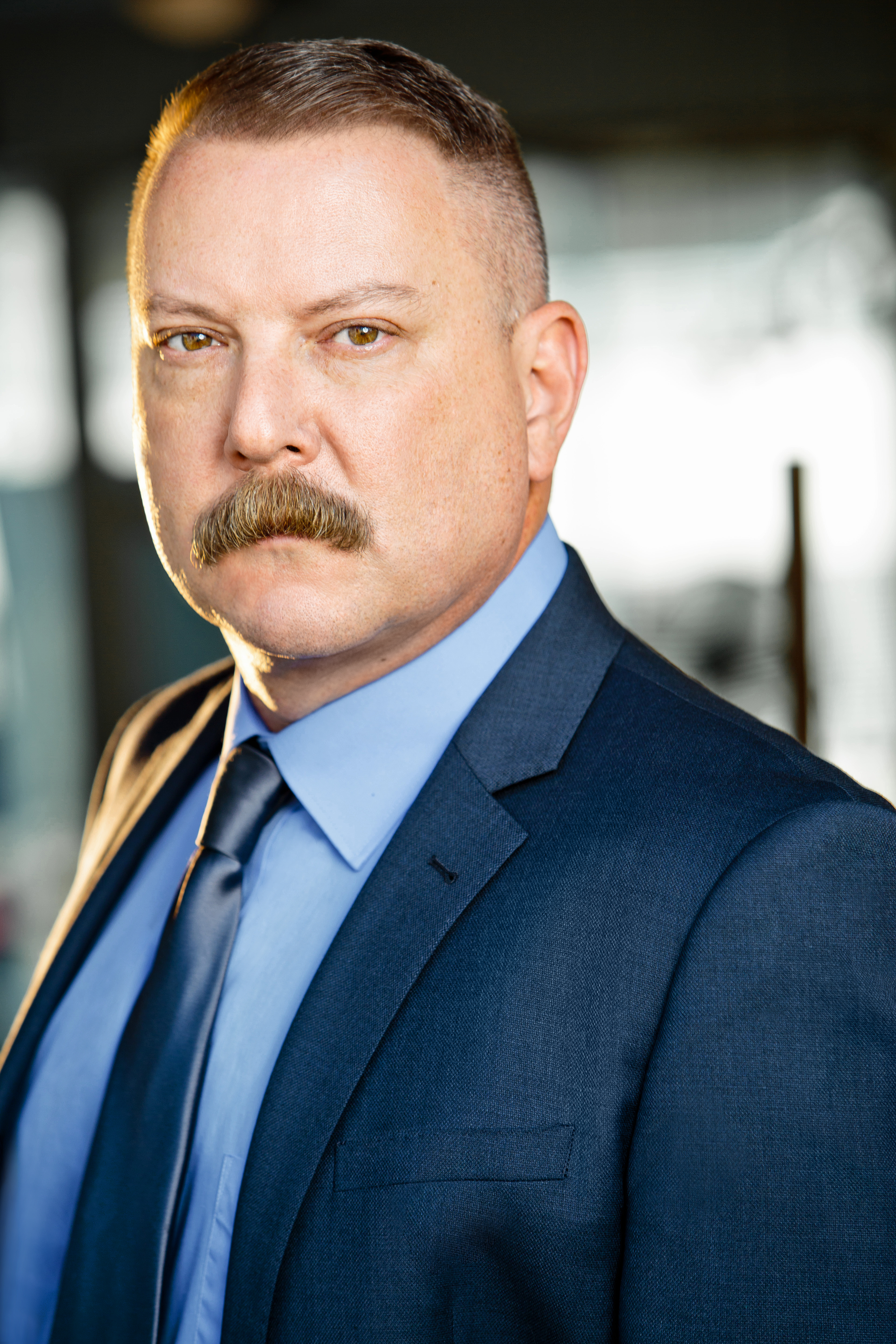

== Early life and education ==
Raised in the San Francisco Bay Area, Eric Womack studied dramatic arts at UC Davis and was a member of the theatre troupe The Sick & Twisted Players in San Francisco. Eric has originated roles in three of playwright Ronnie Larsen's world premiere productions including the critically acclaimed Scenes From My Love Life, X-Mas and CS-A Love Story at San Francisco's Theatre Rhinoceros. Eric now resides in Los Angeles where he continues to work in film and television.

== Career ==
In 2018, Eric Womack appeared as Officer Forrest in Andrew Fleming's latest film Ideal Home starring Paul Rudd, Steve Coogan, Alison Pill and Kate Walsh. Eric has also appeared in co-starring roles on Netflix's Insatiable and NBC's Bad Judge (both directed by Andrew Fleming, as well), FX's Snowfall (directed by John Singleton) and Sean Patrick Murphy's Project Green Light finalist film Don't Be Leary presented on HBO. He was also a recurring regular featured detective on the CBS show Mike & Molly for three seasons (2014–2016).

Short films that Eric Womack has starred in include acting opposite Kate Burton in Amy Barham's Nothing to See Here which was accepted into the Emerging Filmmaker Showcase at the Cannes Film Festival. AFI director Daniel Sawka's bilingual, immigration-themed film Icebox which was a top 10 finalist for the 2018 Best Live Action Short Film for the Academy Awards, Joe Gonzalez's The Proposed (which he also co-produced) was accepted into many film festivals including the 2016 Dances with Films festival in Los Angeles and Scott Sullivan's The Interrogation which was shown as part of the 2016 Newport Beach Film Festival. In 2014, Eric appeared in Bruce Sze Han Chen's multiple award-winning dystopian fantasy short film Awaken, which was accepted into the Cannes Film Festival as well as many domestic and international film festivals.

Music videos Eric appears in include Lin Manuel Miranda's award-winning, Hamilton Mixtape-Immigrants, We Get the Job Done, directed by Tomas Whitmore for Diktator Film, Jennifer Lopez's music video for her single Ain't Your Mama (directed by Cameron Duddy) and two of director Chris Marrs Piliero's videos for the all female group G.R.L.'s Ugly Heart single and Thank You Very Much from European pop star Margaret.
