= Ralph Sall =

American songwriter

- Born: August 23, 1963 (age 62)
- Occupations: Record producer, music supervisor, composer, songwriter
- Label: Bulletproof
- Website: www.ralphsall.com

Ralph Sall is an American record producer, music supervisor, composer, songwriter and screenwriter. He is the president of Bulletproof Entertainment, a company involved in several facets of the entertainment industry, including film, television, comic books and graphic novels, music, internet and live theatre.

== Personal life ==
Sall is a Summa Cum Laude Phi Beta Kappa graduate of Yale University. A native of Miami, he currently resides in Los Angeles with his wife Lisa and their three young children.

== Career ==
As a record producer, Sall has produced tracks with Paul McCartney, The Ramones, Stone Temple Pilots, Jewel, Sugar Ray, Sublime, Smash Mouth, Cheap Trick, Aerosmith, Jane’s Addiction and Creed. As a songwriter, Sall has written tracks for Liz Phair, Jewel, George Clinton and Sugar Ray.

Tracks by his group, All Too Much, have been featured in the romantic comedies The In-Laws (2003), Failure to Launch (2006) and License to Wed (2007).

Sall has written and produced original songs for films, including "Rollin’ with My Homies", co-written with Coolio, for Clueless (1995) and "Words to Me", with Sugar Ray, for Scooby-Doo (2002).

As composer and executive music producer on Andrew Fleming’s Hamlet 2 (2008), Sall wrote the majority of the music and performed the songs "Rock Me Sexy Jesus" and "You’re as Gay as the Day Is Long" under The Ralph Sall Experience. He previously collaborated with Fleming on the films Threesome (1994), The Craft (1996), Dick (1999) and Nancy Drew (2007). He scored The New Guy (2002) and Grind (2003), the latter of which he also wrote the screenplay.

Sall won the 1994 Razzie Award (Worst Original Song) for the song "Addams Family (Whoomp!)" from Addams Family Values. He shared the award with co-writers Stephen Gibson and Cecil Glenn.

== Other ventures ==
Sall’s Interstellar Force, a dance music project, charted a Billboard hit with their cover of the Star Wars theme.

Sall produced the tribute album Deadicated, featuring the songs of the Grateful Dead. He went on to create the triple-platinum selling Common Thread: The Songs of the Eagles, Stoned Immaculate: The Music of the Doors and the Gold-certified Saturday Morning: Cartoons' Greatest Hits, as well as the Paul McCartney tribute The Art of McCartney, released in November 2014.

== Filmography ==
=== Music supervisor ===
Year	Title	Notes
1990	Downtown	
1990	Tremors	
1992	Encino Man	
1992	Buffy the Vampire Slayer	
1993	Addams Family Values	
1994	Threesome	
1994	PCU	
1994	Speed	
1995	Billy Madison	
1996	Bio-Dome	
1996	The Craft	
1997	Switchback	
1997	The Man Who Knew Too Little	
1998	The Replacement Killers	
1998	Can't Hardly Wait	
1999	10 Things I Hate About You	
1999	Dick	
1999	Three Kings	
2000	Grosse Pointe	TV series
2001	Happy Campers	
2002	Paranormal Girl	TV movie
2002	Clockstoppers	
2002	The New Guy	Also composer
2002	Scooby-Doo	
2003	The In-Laws	
2003	Grind	Also composer
2004	Mean Girls	
2004	Garfield	
2005	Sahara	
2005	Mad Hot Ballroom	
2005	King's Ransom	
2005	Herbie: Fully Loaded	
2005	Bad News Bears	
2005	The Protector	
2005	Weeds	TV series
2005	Head Cases	TV series
2005	Kitchen Confidential	TV series
2005	First Descent	
2006	Last Holiday	
2006	Failure to Launch	
2006	Slither	
2006	I Want Someone to Eat Cheese With	
2006	Clerks II	
2006	Barnyard	
2006	How to Eat Fried Worms	
2006	Jackass Number Two	
2006	Let's Go to Prison	
2006	Charlotte's Web	
2007	Because I Said So	
2007	Sex and Death 101	
2007	Nancy Drew	Also composer
2007	The Hills Have Eyes II	
2007	Arctic Tale	
2007	License to Wed	
2007	Shoot 'Em Up	
2008	Hamlet 2	Also composer and songwriter
2009	Ghosts of Girlfriends Past	
2009	Degrassi: The Next Generation	TV series; season 9
2019	Wonder Park	

== Discography ==
=== Compilations ===
- Common Thread: The Songs of the Eagles (1994)
- Saturday Morning: Cartoons' Greatest Hits (1995)
- Stoned Immaculate: The Music of the Doors (2000)
- Southern Rock Country Style (2004)
- Hey, That's Funny!: Comedy's Greatest Hits (2004)
- The Art of McCartney (2014)
