= The In-Laws (2003 film) =

2003 film directed by Andrew Fleming

- Theatrical release poster
- Directed by: Andrew Fleming
- Screenplay by: Nat Mauldin; Ed Solomon
- Based on: The In-Laws; 1979 film by Andrew Bergman
- Produced by: Bill Gerber; Elie Samaha; Bill Todman Jr.; Joel Simon
- Starring: Michael Douglas; Albert Brooks; Robin Tunney; Ryan Reynolds; Candice Bergen
- Cinematography: Alexander Gruszynski
- Edited by: Mia Goldman
- Music by: Klaus Badelt; James S. Levine
- Production companies: Franchise Pictures; Gerber Pictures; Furthur Films; MHF Zweite Academy Film
- Distributed by: Warner Bros. Pictures
- Release date: May 23, 2003
- Running time: 98 minutes
- Country: United States
- Language: English
- Budget: $40 million
- Box office: $26.8 million

The In-Laws is a 2003 American action comedy film starring Michael Douglas, Albert Brooks, Robin Tunney, Ryan Reynolds and Candice Bergen. The film is a remake of the 1979 cult classic of the same name. Scenes for the 2003 film were shot on location in Chicago. The film was released by Warner Bros. Pictures on May 23, 2003 and was a box office failure and received mixed to negative reviews.

== Plot ==
Steve Tobias is an undercover agent of the CIA whose son, Mark, is marrying Melissa Peyser. Her father is mild-mannered foot doctor, Jerry Peyser. When the two families meet for dinner, Peyser stumbles on to Steve Tobias' secret operation as Tobias tries to set up a deal to sell a Russian submarine, the Olga, to an arms smuggler in France as bait to catch arms smugglers. As Peyser's incidental involvement increases, he is suspected by the FBI of being part of a seemingly malicious deal. Peyser does not want to be involved in the deal or with Tobias' family but is either dragged in against his will or tricked into participating in wild escapades with Tobias. The two future fathers-in-law end up dodging bullets, jumping off buildings, and stealing jets together as they attempt to avoid capture by the FBI. After the wedding reception ends with a last chase scene, they are finally left alone with only their children and wives to have a quiet marriage ceremony, presided over by the FBI agent who was chasing them.

== Cast ==
- Michael Douglas as Steve Tobias
- Albert Brooks as Jerry Peyser
- Robin Tunney as Angela Harris
- Ryan Reynolds as Mark Tobias, Steve & Judy's son
- David Suchet as Jean-Pierre Thibodoux
- Lindsay Sloane as Melissa Peyser, Jerry & Katherine's daughter
- Candice Bergen as Judy Tobias, Steve's ex-wife
- Russell Andrews as Agent Will Hutchins
- Maria Ricossa as Katherine Peyser, Jerry's wife
- Vladimir Radian as Cherkasov
- Michael Bodnar as Cherkasov's Bodyguard
- Boyd Banks as Patient
- Susan Aceron as Nurse
- Chang Tseng as Quan Le
- Tamara Gorski as Yadira
- Matt Birman as Agent at Restaurant
- Richard Waugh as Agent Thorn
- Kristin Chenoweth as Person in the Background

== Reception ==
=== Box office ===
The film was released in theaters on May 23, 2003, opening against Bruce Almighty in North America. It finished its first weekend in 5th place with $7,319,848. It was a box office disappointment, ultimately recouping just under $27 million of its $40 million budget.

=== Critical response ===
The In-Laws had a mixed to negative critical reception. Rotten Tomatoes gives the film a 33% score, based on 136 reviews, with an average rating of 5.00/10. The website's critics consensus states: "Bigger and slicker than the original, but not necessarily better". On Metacritic, it has a score of 46 out of 100 based on 32 critics’ reviews, indicating "mixed or average reviews".

Roger Ebert of the Chicago Sun-Times awarded the film 2 out of 4 stars, writing "The In-Laws is an accomplished but not inspired remake of a 1979 comedy which was inspired and so did not need to be accomplished. The earlier movie was slapdash and at times seemed to be making itself up as it went along, but it had big laughs and a kind of lunacy. The remake knows the moves but lacks the recklessness." Ebert felt the remake lacked the comedic chemistry of Alan Arkin and Peter Falk in the original film, adding "Comedy works better when the characters seem utterly unaware that they are being funny." Michael Wilmington of the Chicago Tribune wrote, "You could say the same of Fleming, who's tended to work best when he's dealing with young protagonists, as in Dick, The Craft and Threesome. Fleming has a serious approach to comedy, visible here too, but drowned in the action and hoopla. He seems almost overwhelmed and the movie preposterously inflated."

== See also ==
- The In-Laws (1979 film)
