= Alexander Gruszynski =

Polish-American cinematographer

Alexander Gruszynski, A.S.C.
- Born: June 19, 1950 (age 76); Warsaw, Poland
- Education: National Film School of Denmark
- Years active: 1977–2022

Alexander Gruszynski (born June 19, 1950) is a Polish-American cinematographer, actor and film director.

== Filmography ==
=== Documentary film ===
Year	Title	Director	Notes
1976	Your Neighbor's Son	Jørgen Flindt Pedersen; Erik Stephensen	
1979	En rig mand	Jon Bang Carlsen	
1980	Tomas - et barn du ikke kan nå	Mads Egmont Christensen; Lone Hertz	With Bille August
1981	Hotel of the Stars	Jon Bang Carlsen	
1981	Sindslidelser	Lars Engels	
1984	Fugl Fønix	Jon Bang Carlsen	
1991	Christiania - du har mit hjerte	Nils Vest	With Dirk Brüel, Gregers Nielsen, Manuel Sellner and Freddy Tornberg
1995	Haiti. Uden titel	Jørgen Leth	With Tómas Gislason, Dan Holmberg and Jørgen Leth
2002	Drømmere	Jørgen Leth	With Dan Holmberg, Teit Jørgensen, Bo Tengberg
2016	Déjà Vu	Jon Bang Carlsen	Shared credit with Jon Bang Carlsen

Documentary short

Year	Title	Director	Notes
1977	Jenny	Jon Bang Carlsen	
1982	Danmark: Dit og mit	Jørgen Vestergaard	With Rolf Rønne
2020	Instrument of Hope	Mikael Salomon	With Iain Marcks

=== Feature film ===
Cinematographer

Year	Title	Director	Notes
1979	Achilleshælen er mit våben	Jytte Rex	With Dirk Brüel and Jytte Rex
1980	Next Stop Paradise	Jon Bang Carlsen	
1981	Belladonna	Jytte Rex	
1983	Udenrigskorrespondenten	Jørgen Leth	
1984	Almost You	Adam Brooks	
1984	The Oasis	Sparky Greene	
1985	Twisted	Adam Holender	
1985	Ofelia kommer til byen	Jon Bang Carlsen	
1987	Promised Land	Michael Hoffman	With Ueli Steiger
1987	Under Cover	John Stockwell	
1988	Time Out	Jon Bang Carlsen	
1988	Bad Dreams	Andrew Fleming	
1990	Tremors	Ron Underwood	
1991	Stone Cold	Craig R. Baxley	
1993	The Russian Singer	Morten Arnfred	
1994	Threesome	Andrew Fleming	
1994	I Like It Like That	Darnell Martin	
1994	The Pagemaster	Joe Johnston	Live-action scenes
1995	Angus	Patrick Read Johnson	
1996	The Craft	Andrew Fleming	
1996	Maximum Risk	Ringo Lam	
1998	54	Mark Christopher	
1999	Dick	Andrew Fleming	
2001	The Brothers	Gary Hardwick	
2001	Prison Song	Darnell Martin	
2001	Two Can Play That Game	Mark Brown	
2003	Deliver Us from Eva	Gary Hardwick	
2003	The In-Laws	Andrew Fleming	
2006	Five Fingers	Laurence Malkin	
2007	Nancy Drew	Andrew Fleming	
2007	This Christmas	Preston A. Whitmore II	
2008	Hamlet 2	Andrew Fleming	
2009	Madea Goes to Jail	Tyler Perry	
2009	I Can Do Bad All by Myself	Tyler Perry	
2010	Kidnappet	Vibeke Muasya	
2010	For Colored Girls	Tyler Perry	
2012	Good Deeds	Tyler Perry	
2012	Madea's Witness Protection	Tyler Perry	
2013	Temptation: Confessions of a Marriage Counselor	Tyler Perry	
2013	Peeples	Tina Gordon Chism	
2013	A Madea Christmas	Tyler Perry	
2014	Barefoot	Andrew Fleming	
2014	The Single Moms Club	Tyler Perry	
2018	Ideal Home	Andrew Fleming	
2018	I'll Find You	Martha Coolidge	

Director

- Black Dawn (2005) (Direct-to-video)

=== Television ===
TV movies

Year	Title	Director
1985	Surviving: A Family in Crisis	Waris Hussein
1985	Murder: By Reason of Insanity	Anthony Page
1986	Mafia Princess	Robert L. Collins
1986	A Fight for Jenny	Gilbert Moses
1987	The Last Innocent Man	Roger Spottiswoode
1989	Third Degree Burn	Roger Spottiswoode
1990	By Dawn's Early Light	Jack Sholder
1991	Cast a Deadly Spell	Martin Campbell
1995	Kingfish: A Story of Huey P. Long	Paul Monash

TV series

Year	Title	Director	Notes
1986	Everyman	Jon Bang Carlsen	Episode "Phoenix Bird: The Tale of a Warrior"
1989	The Women of Brewster Place	Donna Deitch	Miniseries
2000	Grosse Pointe	Andrew Fleming	Episode "Pilot"
2009	Wallander	Charlotte Brändström	Episode "The Revenge"
2014	Bad Judge	Andrew Fleming; Jake Szymanski; Linda Mendoza	4 episodes
2018	Insatiable	Andrew Fleming	Episode "Pilot"
2018	Conspiracy of Silence	Charlotte Brändström	8 episodes
2020	Emily in Paris	Andrew Fleming; Peter Lauer	3 episodes

== Awards and nominations ==
Year	Award	Category	Title	Result
1995	American Society of Cinematographers	Outstanding Achievement in Cinematography	Kingfish: A Story of Huey P. Long	Nominated
1995	CableACE Award	Best Cinematography in a Movie or Miniseries	Kingfish: A Story of Huey P. Long	Nominated
1977	Bodil Awards	Best Cinematographer	Jenny	Won
1993	Camerimage	Golden Frog	The Russian Singer	Nominated
1994	Independent Spirit Awards	Best Cinematography	I Like It Like That	Nominated
2017	Cleveland International Film Festival	Jury Award	Tripolar	Nominated
