= The Craft (film) =

1996 film by Andrew Fleming

- Theatrical release poster
- Directed by: Andrew Fleming
- Screenplay by: Peter Filardi; Andrew Fleming
- Story by: Peter Filardi
- Produced by: Douglas Wick
- Starring: Fairuza Balk; Robin Tunney; Neve Campbell; Rachel True
- Cinematography: Alexander Gruszynski
- Edited by: Jeff Freeman
- Music by: Graeme Revell
- Production companies: Columbia Pictures; Red Wagon Entertainment
- Distributed by: Sony Pictures Releasing
- Release date: May 3, 1996
- Running time: 101 minutes
- Country: United States
- Language: English
- Budget: $15 million
- Box office: $55.6 million

The Craft is a 1996 American teen supernatural horror film directed by Andrew Fleming from a screenplay by Peter Filardi and Fleming and a story by Filardi. The film stars Robin Tunney, Fairuza Balk, Neve Campbell, and Rachel True as four outcast teenage girls at a Los Angeles parochial high school who pursue witchcraft for their own gain and experience negative repercussions.

The Craft was theatrically released in the United States on May 3, 1996, by Sony Pictures Releasing. It received mixed reviews from critics but was a surprise hit nonetheless, earning $6.7 million in its opening weekend and $55.6 million worldwide, against a budget of $15 million.

The Craft was nominated for the Saturn Awards for Best Horror Film and for Best Supporting Actress (Balk), and won the MTV Movie Award for Best Fight (Balk and Tunney). In the years since its release, the film has gained a cult following. A sequel, The Craft: Legacy, was released on October 28, 2020.

== Plot ==
Sarah Bailey, a troubled teenager with unusual abilities, moves from San Francisco to Los Angeles with her father and stepmother and starts attending an upscale Catholic School. At her new school, she befriends a trio of outcast girls rumored to be witches, each with their own troubles; Bonnie Harper bears burn scars over her body, Nancy Downs lives in a trailer with her mother and abusive stepfather, and Rochelle Zimmerman, a black student, endures racist bullying from a group of white girls. The three girls worship a powerful earth deity they call Manon.

Popular jock Chris Hooker shows interest in Sarah, which she reciprocates. When Bonnie sees Sarah levitating a pencil in class, the outcasts become convinced that she is "the fourth" they need to complete their coven—representing the Four Elements—and make them powerful. While walking home from school, the girls are approached by a vagrant who had earlier frightened Sarah with a snake (since a home invasion) when she moved in. As he chases her, he is struck and killed by a car. The girls believe their combined will caused the accident, strengthening their bond. It is also revealed that Sarah once attempted suicide.

After a date with Chris, Sarah is devastated when he spreads a false rumor that they had sex. Seeking revenge or change, each girl casts a spell: Sarah places a love spell on Chris, Rochelle curses her bully Laura Lizzie, Bonnie wishes for beauty, and Nancy asks for power. The spells succeed: Chris becomes obsessed with Sarah, Bonnie's scars miraculously heal, Laura's hair begins to fall out, and Nancy's stepfather dies of a heart attack, allowing her and her mother to collect his life insurance and move into a luxurious high-rise apartment.

Drunk on power, Nancy urges the others to join her in a ritual called Invocation of the Spirit—despite warnings from Lirio, the owner of a local occult shop and practicing witch. During the ritual, Nancy is struck by lightning. The next morning, she is seen walking on water, surrounded by beached sharks and other dead sea creatures. In the days that follow, Nancy becomes increasingly unstable and reckless, endangering herself and others.

The spells soon bring unintended consequences: Bonnie grows vain and cruel, Rochelle is disturbed to find Laura traumatized by her baldness, and Chris's obsession turns violent. When Sarah rejects his advances, Chris attempts to rape her. To punish him, Nancy uses a glamour spell to impersonate Sarah and tries to seduce him at a party. The real Sarah intervenes, but when Chris realizes Nancy's deception, he accuses her of jealousy. Furious, Nancy kills him by throwing him out a window.

Sarah attempts a binding spell to stop Nancy from causing more harm, but it fails, and the coven turns against her. They invade her dreams, conjure swarms of insects, and make her believe her family has died in a plane crash, driving her toward suicide. Overcoming her fear, Sarah successfully invokes Manon herself, healing and empowering her. She uses her magic to terrify Bonnie and Rochelle with mirror illusions—Bonnie is re-scarred on her face, Rochelle's hair falling out—before defeating and binding Nancy, rendering her harmless.

Later, Bonnie and Rochelle visit Sarah who now attends public school, hoping to reconcile. She rejects them, telling them that Manon stripped their powers because they abused them. Scoffing, they claim Sarah must have lost hers too—until she conjures a lightning storm and nearly crushes them with a falling tree branch. She warns them not to end up like Nancy, who has been committed to a psychiatric hospital, delusional and restrained, insisting she can fly.

== Cast ==
- Robin Tunney as Sarah Bailey
- Fairuza Balk as Nancy Downs
- Neve Campbell as Bonnie Harper
- Rachel True as Rochelle Zimmerman
- Skeet Ulrich as Chris Hooker
- Christine Taylor as Laura Lizzie
- Breckin Meyer as Mitt
- Nathaniel Marston as Trey
- Cliff DeYoung as Mr. Bailey
- Assumpta Serna as Lirio
- Helen Shaver as Grace Downs
- Brenda Strong as doctor
- William Newman as street preacher
- John Kapelos (uncredited) as Ray, Nancy's stepfather
- Janet Eilber as Sarah's mother

== Production ==
The concept for The Craft came from a collaboration between producer Douglas Wick, who wanted to create a film about the high school experience blended with witchcraft, and screenwriter Peter Filardi, who extensively researched the topic and wrote the initial draft. Andrew Fleming was hired to direct and produce the final version of the screenplay.

Eighty-five actresses screen-tested for the four main roles, including Angelina Jolie, Scarlett Johansson and Alicia Silverstone. Rachel True and Fairuza Balk were the first to be cast in their respective roles. The character of Rochelle was re-written to be black when True was cast, and a racism subplot was incorporated as the character's major conflict. Robin Tunney was initially cast in the role of Bonnie, but the producers decided she would be better in the starring role of Sarah, which she was persuaded to accept despite preferring the former. Neve Campbell, the most well known of the four actresses for her role on Party of Five, was then cast as Bonnie. Tunney had shaved her head for her role in Empire Records and had to wear a wig throughout filming.

Production enlisted a practicing Wiccan named Pat Devin to act as an on-set advisor for the film. She wrote the incantations used and ensured that the treatment of the Wiccan subject-matter was as accurate and respectful as possible.

Filming began on May 1, 1995, and wrapped on July 19, 1995. Shooting took place throughout Los Angeles, including the Los Angeles International Airport, Sunset Boulevard, and Broadway. Verdugo Hills High School was the setting for the fictional Catholic school, St. Benedict's Academy; production designer Marek Dobrowolski added different religious statues throughout the building and the grounds. Sarah's home in the film was a two-story Spanish mansion and the interiors were built on a soundstage at Culver City Studios. The occult bookstore was shot at the El Adobe Marketplace in Hollywood Boulevard. The room was repainted and enhanced and occult icons such as candles, stigmas, religious statues, masks, and tribal dolls were added for effect. Jensen's Recreation Center in Echo Park was chosen to avoid overuse of frequently seen Los Angeles locations. During filming, an unrelated accident occurred in which a child was injured; the production's medic saw this and called paramedics. The makeshift altar was set in Wood Ranch, a location that Dobrowolski called the hardest to find. Dobrowolski wanted to avoid manicured parks like Griffith Park. The beach summoning took place at Leo Carrillo State Park, which was chosen because its crest made it seem less visually boring.

The makeup effects were designed and created by Tony Gardner and his special effects company Alterian, Inc., which also created the beached sharks for the film.

== Costume design ==
The Craft's costume design was a contributor to it becoming a cult classic. In order to encapsulate the nineties goth look, the costumes included dog collars, layered necklaces and crucifixes, fishnet shirts, black dresses, thigh-high stockings, and dark lipstick.

Deborah Everton was the costume designer for the film. She began her career as an actress in the early 1980s but eventually moved into costume design, working as a costume assistant for Bad Dreams (1988) and gaining her first costume designer credit on The Abyss (1989). In an interview with Dazed for the 20th anniversary of The Craft, Everton talked about her approach to styling the film. She initially found it challenging because, in the script, all four leads mostly wore Catholic school uniforms but, after some thought, she realised it was a great opportunity to use the costumes to further explore each character, creating visual motifs for their individual journeys and development.

Everton took special care with making sure the clothing and style of each character reflected their mindset and economic realities. "Her character [Nancy] lived in a trailer park and her mom was an alcoholic, they didn't have a lot of money, so a lot of her stuff had to come from pretty low-end sources – if I couldn't find what I wanted I would just make it." She spoke explicitly about how Nancy's style was a metaphorical suit of armor crafted to scare and reject others before they could do it to her. "Her PVC coat said a lot about her character."

The staying power of the film's costume design is evidenced by the Bratz x The Craft collection launched in 2026. For its 30th anniversary, four special edition Bratz dolls were created to represent Bonnie, Sarah, Rochelle, and Nancy, with each doll sporting their character's most memorable outfit.

== Soundtrack ==
The Craft: Music from the Motion Picture

Soundtrack album by Various artists
- Released: April 30, 1996
- Genres: Rock; alternative rock; indie rock; pop rock
- Length: 54:17
- Label: Columbia

Professional ratings
Review scores
Source	Rating
AllMusic	1.5/5 stars

The Craft: Music from the Motion Picture was released on April 30, 1996, by Columbia Records on CD and cassette, one month before the film's official theatrical release in the United States. The soundtrack contains a collection of songs, to suit the theme of the movie, from various artists including Heather Nova, Letters to Cleo, and Spacehog. Nova's version of "I Have the Touch", originally performed by Peter Gabriel, which featured during the end credits of the film, was exclusively included on the soundtrack, and is not available as a single, or on any of Nova's albums, nor does she perform the song in concert. The tracks in film, titled "Sick Child", "Fallin'" and "Scorn", performed by Siouxsie and the Banshees, Connie Francis and Portishead, respectively, were omitted from the soundtrack due to copyright issues from their record labels. However, they were only included in the film as part of an arrangement with PolyGram Film & Television Licensing. An uncredited bonus track, "Bells, Books, and Candles", composed by Graeme Revell for the film's score, was included on the soundtrack.
A follow-up soundtrack, The Original Motion Picture Score, was released on June 18, 1996, from Varèse Sarabande, and contained the film's score which was entirely composed and produced by Graeme Revell.

=== Track listing ===
No.	Title	Writer(s)	Performer(s)	Length
1.	"Tomorrow Never Knows"	John Lennon, Paul McCartney	Our Lady Peace	4:14
2.	"I Have the Touch"	Peter Gabriel	Heather Nova	4:17
3.	"All This and Nothing"	Vinnie Dombroski	Sponge	4:19
4.	"Dangerous Type"	Ric Ocasek	Letters to Cleo	3:39
5.	"How Soon Is Now?"	Steven Morrissey, John Marr	Love Spit Love	4:25
6.	"Dark Secret"	Matthew Sweet	Matthew Sweet	4:04
7.	"Witches Song"	Marianne Faithfull; Joe Mavety; Barry Reynolds; Terry Stannard; Steve York	Juliana Hatfield	4:35
8.	"Jump Into the Fire"	Harry Nilsson	Tripping Daisy	5:45
9.	"Under the Water"	Jewel Kilcher, Ralph Sall	Jewel	4:58
10.	"Warning"	Tim DeLaughter, Ralph Sall	All Too Much	4:44
11.	"Spastica"	Justine Frischmann	Elastica	2:31
12.	"The Horror"	Royston Langdon	Spacehog	4:49
13.	"Bells, Books and Candles"	Revell	Graeme Revell	4:47

== Release ==
The Craft was theatrically released in the United States on May 3, 1996, by Columbia Pictures.

=== Home media ===
The film was released on VHS on October 8, 1996, by Columbia TriStar Home Video. It was first released on DVD on July 22, 1997, and rereleased on a special edition DVD on September 12, 2000. The film debuted on the Blu-ray format for the first time on October 13, 2009.

The film was given a special collector's edition on March 12, 2019, by Shout Factory. Though the new collection of special features was praised, the disc received negative reviews for not remastering the image and simply porting over the old scan from the 2009 disc.

The film was re-released by Shout Factory on 4K UHD on May 17, 2022, for the film's 25th Anniversary. The film was given a fresh new 4K scan from the original camera negative.

== Reception ==
=== Box office ===
The film opened at number one at the North American box office, making US$6,710,995. The movie was a sleeper hit, which Columbia attributed to teenagers and young women, who responded to its themes. According to Box Office Mojo, The Craft is the 11th-highest-grossing film since 1980 dealing with the genre of witches.

=== Critical reception ===
The film received mixed reviews. On Rotten Tomatoes, 57% of 61 critics gave the film a positive review, with an average rating of 5.6/10. The site's consensus reads: "The Craft's campy magic often overrides the feminist message at the film's core, but its appealing cast and postmodern perspective still cast a sporadic spell". Metacritic, which uses a weighted average, assigned the film a score of 56 out of 100, based on 21 critics, indicating "mixed or average" reviews.

Emanuel Levy of Variety described it as "a neatly crafted film that begins most promisingly as a black comedy a la Heathers, but gradually succumbs to its tricky machinery of special effects". Roger Ebert also felt the film was mired in excessive special effects, but praised the performances of the four leads, as did Mick LaSalle of the San Francisco Chronicle. Stephen Holden of The New York Times echoed other reviews, praising the first half of the film as a "celebration of adolescent nonconformity and female independence", but criticized the last half as a "heavy-handed sermon about karma" with "garish" special effects. Rita Kempley of The Washington Post called it "a brew of Hawthorne, Heathers and Hollywood hocus-pocus" that was nonetheless a "bubbling mess of a movie" that "leaves us more bothered than bewitched".

The film was nominated for a Saturn Award for Best Horror Film and Fairuza Balk for Best Supporting Actress. Balk and Tunney also won the MTV Movie Award for Best Fight.

== Legacy ==
The film is often labeled a "cult classic" and has acquired a loyal fan base and social media presence. Matthew Jacobs and Julia Brucculieri of the Huffington Post, writing in 2016, praised The Craft for departing from clichés of the teen movie genre and incorporating darker themes, saying it became "part of the '90s teen canon and a cult classic of its own merit." Kristen Yoonsoo Kim of Complex magazine praised the relevance of the film 20 years later, saying it "feels much more progressive than many of the movies that come out today" and calling the viewing of the film "a rite of passage" for young women. Angelica Jade Bastién of Vulture wrote, "The Craft earned a generation of devoted fans because of how it charts the friendship between these four girls — its tentative beginnings, the joys of its strength, and its ultimate downfall," and singled out "Fairuza Balk's fierce performance ... [as] perhaps The Craft's greatest legacy ... She's a beguiling and fearsome portrait of female anger."

In subsequent years Rachel True has spoken out about being what she felt was the token black character in the film. She has said that the majority of her character's scenes and sub-plot, including depictions of her family life, were completely cut and her conflict narrowed down to conflict with a racist class-mate. She has also stated that race plays a role in her disinclusion in attendance at present day panels and conventions celebrating the film.

In 2013, three of the main actresses, with the exception of Fairuza Balk, reunited for a special Halloween screening of the film at the Hollywood Forever Cemetery.

The 2000 animated show X-Men: Evolution used footage of the girls walking down the hallway from The Craft as an Easter egg reference in episode 13 of Season 2, "Walk on the Wild Side".

The Craft served as an inspiration for the 2013 song "Dark Horse" by Katy Perry.

The film can briefly be seen during the end credits of the Marvel Television series Agatha All Along.

The first episode of the second season of the animated television series The Wonderfully Weird World of Gumball is structured as a parodic retelling of The Craft.

== Sequel ==
A straight-to-DVD sequel was in the works, but it was terminated. In May 2016, Sony Pictures announced that a sequel of The Craft was in development and it would be written and directed by Leigh Janiak. The announcement of the sequel spawned negative reactions from fans of the original film.

In March 2019, it was announced that the development of the sequel had been taken over by Jason Blum and his Blumhouse Productions company, and it was also announced that the film would be distributed by Columbia Pictures. Zoe Lister-Jones signed on to write the script and direct the film with filming scheduled to begin in July 2019. Daniel Casey later joined the production as screenwriter. In June 2019, Cailee Spaeny was cast as one of the leads. In September 2019, Gideon Adlon, Lovie Simone and Zoey Luna were cast for the remaining three lead roles. In October 2019, David Duchovny joined the cast in an undisclosed role. Later, Michelle Monaghan joined the film in an undisclosed role. Two more casting announcements were made in October 2019, also in undisclosed roles, Nicholas Galitzine and Julian Grey. Filming began on October 22, 2019.

In late September 2020, Sony released an official trailer and announced that instead of a theatrical release, the film was released on demand everywhere on October 28, 2020. None of the original actresses returned for the sequel.

== See also ==
- List of films about witchcraft
