= The In-Laws (1979 film) =

1979 comedy film directed by Arthur Hiller

- Theatrical release poster
- Directed by: Arthur Hiller
- Written by: Andrew Bergman
- Produced by: Arthur Hiller; William Sackheim
- Starring: Peter Falk; Alan Arkin
- Cinematography: David M. Walsh
- Edited by: Robert E. Swink
- Music by: John Morris
- Production company: Warner Bros.
- Distributed by: Warner Bros.
- Release date: June 15, 1979
- Running time: 103 minutes
- Country: United States
- Languages: English; Spanish
- Budget: $9 million
- Box office: $38.2 million

The In-Laws is a 1979 American action comedy film starring Alan Arkin and Peter Falk, written by Andrew Bergman and directed by Arthur Hiller. It was filmed on various locations, including Mexico, which served as the film's representation of the fictional Central American setting. A remake was made in 2003.

The film focuses on the fathers of a young couple. One of the fathers is a mild-mannered dentist, the other claims to be a renegade agent of the CIA.

== Plot ==
A well-organized gang hijacks an armored car, breaking in and stealing some currency engraving plates while ignoring the actual money. One of the hijackers delivers the plates to Vince Ricardo on the roof of a disused building.

Meanwhile, the daughter of mild-mannered Manhattan dentist Sheldon "Shelly" Kornpett and the son of businessman Vince Ricardo are engaged to be married. At an introductory dinner in which Shelly meets his new in-law, he finds Vince suspicious; during the dinner, Vince tells a crazy story of a nine-month "consulting" trip to 1954 Guatemala. He excuses himself to make a phone call and hides one set of engraving plates in the basement. Later that night, Shelly pleads with his daughter not to marry into the Ricardo clan, but he is talked into giving the marriage a chance.

The following day, Vince appears at Shelly's office and asks for help with breaking into his office safe. Shelly reluctantly agrees. As he retrieves a black bag from Vince's office in an old Herald Square office building, he's surprised by two armed hit men. After a chase and shootout, Vince explains that he has worked for the CIA since the Eisenhower administration and robbed the United States Mint of engraving plates to crack a worldwide inflation plot hatched in Central America. He mentions he robbed the U.S. Mint on his own; the CIA had turned him down, deeming the caper too risky. Vince further upsets Shelly by mentioning he left an engraving plate in the basement of Shelly's house the previous night.

During the wedding preparations, Mrs. Kornpett discovers the engraving plates and brings them to her bank, where she is informed by the U.S. Treasury Department that they were stolen. Shelly arrives home to find Treasury officials there and speeds away, leading to a car chase through suburban New Jersey. Vince tells Shelly he wants him to accompany him to Scranton, Pennsylvania, and the ordeal will be cleared up by the time they return. At a small airport near Lodi, New Jersey, Vince and Shelly board a small jet. Vince co-captains the plane, speaking fluent Chinese with the two-person crew.

To Shelly's consternation, he notices they are flying over the Atlantic Ocean. Vince assures Shelly they are going to Scranton but need to stop in Tijata, a small island south of Honduras. When they arrive, Vince is supposed to meet a corrupt member of the country's legislature, General Jesus Braunschweiger. When they land, Jesus is shot and killed. Vince and Shelly fall under sniper fire, escape, and drive into town. At their hotel, Vince contacts the mastermind of the inflation plot, General Garcia.

Shelly calls the United States Embassy and is told by Barry Lutz, the CIA agent-in-charge, that Vince is a madman who was mentally discharged from the agency. Leaving the hotel, Vince hails a taxi driven by one of the airport snipers. Shelly chases, leaping onto the roof of the car. Vince takes control of the car, crashing into a fruit market. Vince and Shelly reach the general's estate. The insane general gives them $20 million for the plates, awards them medals, and marches them in front of a firing squad. Vince stalls for time until hundreds of CIA agents, led by Lutz, overwhelm the army and take Garcia into custody. Lutz reveals that Vince was telling the truth. However, Vince retires, as he has had enough. He gives Lutz the $10 million he had agreed to deliver from the general. Vince and Shelly take off with five million dollars each, giving their children a wedding gift of a million dollars each.

== Cast ==
- Peter Falk as Vince Ricardo
- Alan Arkin as Sheldon Kornpett
- Richard Libertini as General Garcia
- Nancy Dussault as Carol Kornpett
- Penny Peyser as Barbara Kornpett
- Arlene Golonka as Jean Ricardo
- Michael Lembeck as Tommy Ricardo
- Paul Lawrence Smith as Mo
- Carmine Caridi as Angie
- Ed Begley, Jr. as Barry Lutz
- Sammy Smith as Mr. Hirschorn
- James Hong as Bing Wong
- Barbara Dana as Bank Teller
- Rozsika Halmos as Mrs. Adelman
- Alvaro Carcano as Edgardo
- Jorge Zepeda as Carlos
- Sergio Calderon as Alfonso
- David Paymer as Cab Driver
- Kent Williams as Ski Mask
- John Hancock as T Man #1
- John Finnegan as Deliveryman #1
- Brass Adams as Deliveryman #2
- Eduardo Noriega as Senator Jesus Braunschweiger
- Danny Kwan as Billy Wong
- Maurice Sneed as Paint Boy
- Rosana Soto as Evita

In addition, conductor-composer Carmen Dragon makes a cameo appearance.

== Production ==
Andrew Bergman says the film began when Warner Bros. Pictures approached him saying Alan Arkin and Peter Falk wanted to do a movie together. Bergman said:

I thought immediately, ‘Didn’t they do a movie?’ It’s like, they seemed so perfect for each other! Their personalities, you have a rabbit and a tortoise. You get a hysteric, a person who seems to have no feelings whatsoever ... and I hate constructing plots, hate it more than anything, but I love constructing characters, and this was the perfect thing where the characters were the plot. Whatever Peter said to Alan, that was the plot ... Since my stories are always about people getting in way over their heads ... this movie was the perfect type for me.

== Reception ==
On review aggregator Rotten Tomatoes, the film has an approval rating of 90% based on 29 reviews, with an average rating of 7.7/10. The consensus summarizes: "Fueled by inspired casting, The In-Laws is an odd couple comedy whose clever premise is ably supported by a very funny script." On Metacritic, the film received a score of 69 based on 10 reviews, indicating "generally favorable reviews".

The New York Times film critic Janet Maslin wrote, "Andrew Bergman has written one of those rare comedy scripts that escalates steadily and hilariously, without faltering or even having to strain for an ending. As for Mr. Arkin and Mr. Falk, it is theirs, and not their children's, match that has been made in heaven. The teaming of their characters—milquetoast meets entrepreneur—is reminiscent of 'The Producers'". Dale Pollock of Variety stated, "With 'The In-Laws,' Warner Bros. should have a first certifiable comedy hit of the summer. The Arthur Hiller-William Sackheim production brims over with laughs, but brand of screenwriter Andrew Bergman's humor (previously seen in 'Blazing Saddles') may be too wacky for mainstream audiences." Gene Siskel of the Chicago Tribune gave the film 2.5 stars out of 4 and wrote, "In a way I feel guilty about knocking 'The In-Laws.' It's an original comedy in a summer movie season full of remakes, sequels, and imitative ripoffs. But if the script had given us more dinner party madness and less slapstick, I might have laughed along with everyone else." Kevin Thomas of the Los Angeles Times called it "one of the funniest comedies of the year. This hilarious film, directed by Arthur Hiller and written expressly for Falk and Arkin by Andrew Bergman, wastes not a second in getting laughs." Gary Arnold of The Washington Post dismissed the film as "a heavy-handed, smugly cynical farce." David Ansen wrote in Newsweek, "What makes 'The In-Laws' so engaging is not simply the escalating madness of Andrew Bergman's story (such whimsy could easily grow tiresome), but the deadpan counterpoint supplied by the two stars, who navigate their way through mounting disasters with an air of hilariously unjustified rationality. Bergman's script was tailor-made for Falk and Arkin, and they make the most of it."

The CIA showed the film at the base theater at Camp Peary, its Virginia training facility for recruits.

== Remake ==
The film was remade in 2003.
