= Bad Dreams (film) =

1988 Andrew Fleming film

- Theatrical release poster
- Directed by: Andrew Fleming
- Screenplay by: Andrew Fleming; Steven E. de Souza
- Story by: Andrew Fleming; Michael Dick; P.J. Pettiette; Yuri Zeltser
- Produced by: Gale Anne Hurd
- Starring: Jennifer Rubin; Bruce Abbott; Richard Lynch; Dean Cameron; Harris Yulin
- Cinematography: Alexander Gruszynski
- Edited by: Jeff Freeman
- Music by: Jay Ferguson
- Distributed by: 20th Century Fox
- Release date: April 8, 1988
- Running time: 84 minutes
- Country: United States
- Language: English
- Budget: $4.5 million
- Box office: $9.8 million

Bad Dreams is a 1988 American supernatural slasher film co-written and directed by Andrew Fleming and starring Jennifer Rubin, Bruce Abbott, E. G. Daily, Dean Cameron, Harris Yulin, and Richard Lynch. It follows Cynthia Weston, a woman who awakens from a thirteen-year-long coma and finds herself being stalked by Franklin Harris, the ghost of a cult leader who led a mass suicide by fire that she survived as a child.

Bad Dreams was released by 20th Century Fox on April 8, 1988, and grossed $9.8 million at the box office on a budget of $4.5 million. However, it was criticized by horror fans and critics alike because of its similarities to A Nightmare on Elm Street (1984), even taking into account that Jennifer Rubin was a supporting actress in A Nightmare on Elm Street 3: Dream Warriors (1987).

== Plot ==
In 1975, a cult called Unity Fields commits mass suicide by fire at the behest of its psychopathic leader, Franklin Harris. Cynthia Weston, a child in the cult, refuses to commit suicide and is the sole survivor, but remains comatose.

Thirteen years later, Cynthia awakens from her coma in the hospital. Plagued by disturbing flashbacks of her childhood, Cynthia is forced to attend experimental group therapy sessions for borderline personality disorder at the facility, led by Dr. Alex Karmen. Cynthia is soon visited by visions of a burnt Harris, who beckons her to end her life and attacks fellow patients. In one vision, patient Lana, is drowned by Harris in a baptismal ceremony; moments later, she is found dead in the swimming pool. Cynthia's roommate, Miriam, subsequently dies after leaping from a window in an apparent suicide. Alex reassures Cynthia she is not to blame for the deaths.

Ed and Connie, patients who are lovers, are later killed by walking together into the blades of an industrial fan in the utility room of the hospital. Ralph Pesco, a troubled masochist patient with a tendency for violent outbursts, becomes enamored with Cynthia; finding himself on the edge after the deaths of his fellow members in the group, he knocks down a policeman who was watching him, and goes to talk to Cynthia, who was spending the night with Dr. Karmen in order to feel safe. When he is distracted, Ralph and Cynthia take an elevator to the basement of the hospital. There, during an apparent episode of psychosis and violence, he commits suicide by stabbing himself multiple times.

Awakening from sedation after the incident, Cynthia finds Harris sitting in her room, calling her his "love child," and urging her to commit suicide. Shortly after, Harris visits Gilda, a clairvoyant patient. Instead of allowing him to kill her, Gilda drinks formaldehyde, effectively killing herself. Meanwhile, Karmen discovers his corrupt peer, Dr. Berrisford, has intentionally laced the therapy group's drugs with psychogenic substances, in the hope that it will effectively make the patients suicidal, and thus corroborate Berrisford's research. Alex realizes that Cynthia's suicide is the ultimate goal for Berrisford, so he orders the nurses to call the police and Detective Wasserman, an investigator on the Unity Fields incident. Alex confronts Cynthia, insisting her visions of Harris are not real. He is surprised by Berrisford from behind, who knocks him out and takes Cynthia with him.

Karmen wakes up and pulls the hospital's emergency alarm. Cynthia flees to the rooftop, where Alex finds her standing on the ledge, with Berrisford at her side, encouraging her to jump. She leaps from the building, but before hitting the ground, awakens back at the house in which the Unity Fields members committed suicide. There, she is confronted by Harris, who welcomes her; however, it is only a vision, and she awakens to Alex holding her by the arm as they both dangle over the ledge. Berrisford, knowing that Dr. Karmen has discovered his plot, stabs Alex's hand and attempts to push him to his death as well. His attempt is thwarted by the arrival of the police and Wasserman, who help Alex and Cynthia to climb back. Berrisford uses the distraction to grab one of the cop's revolvers, and readily insists that Dr. Karmen is responsible for altering the patients' medication and the suicides. Alex explains to the police that things are the other way around and shows how Berrisford stabbed his hand. Knowing that all of his schemes have failed, Berrisford pulls the stolen revolver and pretends to commit suicide, but quickly points the gun towards Alex. Before he shoots, Cynthia finally confronts her fear of Harris, realizing that Berrisford is a totally different person, and reacts by charging and pushing him over the ledge to his death.

The authorities retreat from the rooftop. While being comforted there by Dr. Karmen, Cynthia has another brief vision of Harris climbing back from the edge of the building and trying to grab her, which scares her for a second. Alex shakes Cynthia and reassures her that her nightmares are over and there is nothing to fear anymore. She calms down and they both tightly embrace one another.

== Cast ==
- Jennifer Rubin as Cynthia Weston
  - Missy Francis as Young Cynthia Weston
- Bruce Abbott as Dr. Alex Karmen
- Richard Lynch as Franklin Harris
- Dean Cameron as Ralph Pesco
- Harris Yulin as Dr. Berrisford
- Susan Barnes as Connie
- John Scott Clough as Victor
- E. G. Daily as Lana
- Damita Jo Freeman as Gilda
- Louis Giambalvo as Ed
- Susan Ruttan as Miriam
- Sy Richardson as Detective Wasserman
- Sheila Scott-Wilkenson as Hettie
- Ben Kronen as Edgar

== Production ==
Bad Dreams was shot on location in Los Angeles, California over a period of eight weeks, with production beginning on October 26, 1987, and concluding in mid-December. Shooting locations included the California Medical Center and California Medical Building in Los Angeles; Lakeview Hospital in Lake View Terrace; and the Brentwood Veterans Hospital. The budget for the production was $4.5 million.

According to Bad Dreams writer/director Andrew Fleming on the DVD commentary, the choice of the end title song was the greatest drama in the whole making of this film. Fleming wanted to use a live version of the song “Burning House of Love” by X, while 20th Century Fox executive Ralph Sall suggested “Sweet Child o' Mine” by then-unknown band Guns N' Roses, thinking it would be cheaper and a possible hit. Fleming liked Sall's suggestion but did not think it was as appropriate. Eventually Sall got his way. “I think we licensed it for about five cents,” Fleming said. “And only weeks after did it actually become a hit.”

According to Fleming, Guns N' Roses were also going to do a video that incorporated clips from the movie. “They came in and watched it and were stoked by the movie,” Fleming said. “But then Axl Rose's girlfriend, Erin Everly, said the song was about her. She didn’t want a song about her to have clips from a horror movie in it. So she got her way. We didn’t get a video, but Ralph was right about the song.”

== Release ==
Bad Dreams was released theatrically in the United States by 20th Century Fox on April 8, 1988.

=== Home media ===
The film was released on DVD in the United States by Anchor Bay Entertainment in 2006. This version is out of print.

The film was later released by Scream Factory along with Visiting Hours, first as a double feature DVD on September 13, 2011, followed by a Blu-ray release on February 18, 2014.

== Reception ==
=== Box office ===
Bad Dreams grossed $9,797,098 at the U.S. box office.

=== Critical response ===
Bad Dreams received mixed-to-negative reviews from critics.

On the review aggregator website Rotten Tomatoes, 38% of 16 critics' reviews are positive.

Roger Ebert of the Chicago Sun-Times gave the film a half-star out of four, writing: "I praise the production only to suggest that these people should be better employed in worthier projects. It is not surprising to see a violent teenage film exploiting the lowest common denominator and preaching a message of nihilism and despair. It is not surprising to see the latest special-effect technology supplying lingering closeups of burnt flesh and other horrors. What is surprising, I suppose, is that nice people would want to wade in this sewer."

Vincent Canby of The New York Times gave the film a middling review, calling it a "a breezy, bloody kind of amalgam of The Breakfast Club and A Nightmare on Elm Street... It doesn't make a tremendous amount of sense, plot-wise, and it's instantly forgettable. However, it's amusing for as long as it lasts. Also, for a film of this genre, it has a cast of unusually good actors." Michael Sragow of the San Francisco Examiner also noted similarities to A Nightmare on Elm Street as well as "generic" plot elements, though he praised the film's "promising satirical notions of '60s groupiness and '80s self-absorption." Kevin Thomas of the Los Angeles Times called the film "a mildly diverting horror flick" but added that its screenplay "is not truly terrible; it's just not very exciting or original."

The Oregonian's Ted Mahar gave a more favorable assessment of the film, describing it as "a splatter movie that attempts good taste."

== See also ==
- A Nightmare on Elm Street series
