= Ideal Home (film) =

2016 Film-Comedy by Andrew Fleming

- Theatrical release poster
- Directed by: Andrew Fleming
- Written by: Andrew Fleming
- Produced by: Aaron Ryder; Gabrielle Tana; Maria Teresa Arida; Clark Peterson; Maxime Rémillard
- Starring: Steve Coogan; Paul Rudd; Alison Pill; Jake McDorman; Jack Gore
- Cinematography: Alexander Gruszynski
- Edited by: Jeffrey M. Werner
- Music by: Martin Simpson; John Swihart
- Production companies: Remstar Studios; Baby Cow Films; Lucky Monkey Pictures; Mustard and Company
- Distributed by: Brainstorm Media
- Release dates: February 15, 2018 (Mardi Gras); June 29, 2018 (United States)
- Running time: 91 minutes
- Country: United States
- Language: English

Ideal Home is a 2018 American comedy-drama film, written and directed by Andrew Fleming and starring Steve Coogan, Paul Rudd, Alison Pill, Jake McDorman, and Jack Gore, filmed on location in Santa Fe, New Mexico.

Middle-aged gay couple Erasmus Brumble and Paul Morgan suddenly find themselves raising 10-year-old Bill, their previously unknown grandson.

It premiered at the Mardi Gras Film Festival on February 15, 2018, was released in the United States on June 29, 2018 and received middling critical reviews.

== Plot ==
Ten-year-old Bill and his father Beau Brumble awaken to the Albuquerque police banging on their door. A woman has reported an expensive bag stolen from her. Beau lowers Bill out the back window with some cash, sending him to find his previously unknown grandfather Erasmus Brumble in Santa Fe, New Mexico, rather than be thrown into the foster system.

Erasmus is a televised chef and his life-partner Paul is the producer of his cooking show. They live in a large showplace house. On set, the couple constantly bicker. Paul banters with a crew member, insisting at home they are even worse. When asked why he does not leave him, he admits he probably will one day.

As Erasmus and Paul throw a dinner party, Bill shows up at their door claiming to be Erasmus's grandson. Bill's father Beau was the result of a one-time heterosexual encounter, and Erasmus has never met either of them. Paul is more than apprehensive to take him in, as they have not so much as had a pet.

Erasmus and Paul initially have difficulty dealing with the boy. The only food he wants is Taco Bell, and it takes them two weeks to find out his name is Ángel, although he asks to be called Bill.

Another night, Paul and Erasmus have another group over, eating and drinking, and they start asking Bill questions. When they ask where his father is, and he explains he is in jail for assaulting a prostitute. When asked where his mother is, Bill says she was a drug addict, who took a big dose then fell out of the fourth-story window. Paul squeezes his hand to comfort him.

More than two months after Bill moves in with Erasmus and Paul, a social worker from CPS shows up at their front door. Having been notified by the prison regarding Beau's incarceration, she is here to check on the boy. She asks Bill if there is anything strange about living with the couple... unable to describe it, he leads her to a room full of gay erotic DVDs. The social worker calls Erasmus and Paul in, insisting the biggest infraction is that the room was not properly locked.

The couple has to overcome a few more obstacles to finally embrace parenthood, although Paul does most of the heavy lifting. They get better feedback from social services. There is a small hiccup at school, when Bill, sharing about Erasmus and Paul in class, lists several 'politically incorrect' terms for homosexuals.

Beau attempts to get clean in jail, and tells Erasmus and Paul that he plans to take Bill to Arizona once he is released. Bill says he would rather stay with the couple. A lawyer tells Erasmus he is unlikely to get custody unless the boy is in immediate danger from his father.

Erasmus and Paul try to enjoy the holidays with Bill and the time they have left with him. When Beau shows up to take him, Erasmus invites him in, hoping to change his mind. Later that night Beau takes Bill and leaves without saying goodbye.

Erasmus and Paul's relationship has been strained, so Paul tells Erasmus that he plans to take a job with Rachael Ray's show in New York. Erasmus seems indifferent at first but jumps in front of Paul's car and begs him to stay. Paul goes as far as the airport, but turns back and they reconcile.

On the road, Beau crashes their car while under the influence with Bill in the car, resulting in Erasmus and Paul being awarded custody. As the three drive home, Bill surprises them by asking for a sophisticated dish instead of fast food.

== Cast ==
- Steve Coogan as Erasmus Brumble, Beau's father, Bill's grandfather and a TV chef
- Paul Rudd as Paul Morgan, Erasmus's director and long-term partner
- Jack Gore as Angel/Bill Brumble, Erasmus's previously unknown grandson
- Alison Pill as Melissa from Child Protective Services
- Jake McDorman as Beau Brumble, Bill's father and Erasmus’ son
- Jesse Luken as Director
- Eric Womack as Officer Forrest
- Jordyn Aquino as Leticia
- Jenny Gabrielle as Betty
- Lora Martinez-Cunningham Ms. Garcia
- Monique Candelaria as Officer Guttierez
- Frances Lee McCain as Doris
- Marie Wagenman as Little Girl at Indian Party
- Mason Howell as Boy at Indian Party
- Alex Guarnaschelli as herself

== Production ==
Andrew Fleming directed the film from his own script. The film was produced by Aaron Ryder, Gabrielle Tana, Maria Teresa Arida, Clark Peterson, and Maxime Rémillard.

Principal photography on the film began on May 11, 2016 in Santa Fe, New Mexico.

== Release ==
In May 2016, Remstar Films acquired the Canadian distribution rights to the film. The film had its world premiere at the Mardi Gras Film Festival on February 15, 2018. Shortly after, Brainstorm Media acquired U.S. distribution rights to the film and set it for June 29, 2018.

== Reception ==
On review aggregator website Rotten Tomatoes, the film holds an approval rating of 68%, based on 56 reviews, and an average rating of 5.8/10. The critical consensus reads: "Ideal Home benefits from the chemistry between a well-chosen cast, whose work helps tip the scales against the script's inconsistent -- and occasionally retrograde -- humor." On Metacritic, the film has a weighted average rating of 62 out of 100, based on 10 critics, indicating "generally favorable" reviews. Zac Platt of ScreenRealm gave the film 3/5 stars, writing that "even if it's not a must see, the warm and fuzzy tone and winning characters make Ideal Home an easy recommendation."
