= Hamlet 2 =

2008 film by Andrew Fleming

- Theatrical release poster
- Directed by: Andrew Fleming
- Written by: Andrew Fleming; Pam Brady
- Produced by: Eric Eisner; Leonid Rozhetskin; Aaron Ryder
- Starring: Steve Coogan; Catherine Keener; Amy Poehler; David Arquette; Elisabeth Shue
- Cinematography: Alexander Gruszynski
- Edited by: Jeff Freeman
- Music by: Ralph Sall; Steve Brown
- Production companies: L+E Pictures; Bona Fide Productions; ContentFilm International
- Distributed by: Focus Features
- Release dates: January 21, 2008 (Sundance); August 22, 2008 (United States)
- Running time: 92 minutes
- Country: United States
- Language: English
- Budget: $9 million
- Box office: $4.9 million

Hamlet 2 is a 2008 American comedy film directed by Andrew Fleming, written by Fleming and Pam Brady, and starring Steve Coogan, Catherine Keener, Amy Poehler, and David Arquette. It was produced by Eric Eisner, Leonid Rozhetskin, and Aaron Ryder. Hamlet 2 was filmed primarily at a New Mexico high school from September to October 2007. The film premiered at the 2008 Sundance Film Festival and was distributed by Focus Features.

== Plot ==
Dana Marschz is a recovering alcoholic and failed actor who has become a high school drama teacher in Tucson, Arizona. Despite considering himself an inspirational figure, he only has two enthusiastic students, Rand Posin and Epiphany Sellars, and a history of producing poorly received school plays that are essentially stage adaptations of popular Hollywood films (his latest being Erin Brockovich). When the new term begins, a new intake of students are forced to transfer into his class, as it is the only remaining arts elective available due to budget cuts; they are generally unenthusiastic and unconvinced by Dana's pretensions, and Dana comes into conflict with Octavio, one of the new students.

Dana is floored when Principal Rocker notifies him that the drama program is to be shut down at the end of the term. Seeking to inspire his students, Dana undertakes to write and produce an original play: a sequel to Hamlet featuring time travel to avoid the deaths of the characters, and new, more controversial content, including the introduction of Jesus Christ as one of the characters, complete with a song-and-dance number titled "Rock Me Sexy Jesus". The kids gradually warm to the project, but Rand – cast as a bi-curious Laertes and overshadowed by Octavio as Hamlet – storms out of the drama group and provides a copy of the play's script to Principal Rocker, who orders Dana to stop the production.

Dana is further traumatized when his wife Brie leaves him for the uninteresting but fertile boarder Gary they had taken in to supplement their income, and reveals that he himself is infertile. Despondent, Dana falls off the wagon and tries to abandon the project, but his students encourage him to continue, arranging an abandoned warehouse and rave spot, technical assistance, and security provided by the high school's football and wrestling teams. Dana also learns that the cancellation of the play has become a civil liberties issue encouraged by fanatical ACLU activist Cricket Feldstein. As a result, the play opens to a sold-out house, including a critic from The New York Times. Rand returns to the group, apologizing for his desertion; Dana allows him to return to the role of Laertes.

The play itself initially meets with a mixed reception, due to its controversial content and mangling of the original play; in keeping with a running joke throughout the movie, much of the content revolves around the characters using time travel to mend their troubled relationships with their fathers; it ends with both Hamlet and Jesus forgiving their fathers for the wrongs done to them. Although initially reluctant to engage with the play, with several protesters infiltrating the audience to stage a direct protest, the play gradually wins the audience over. Dana and his favorite actress, Elisabeth Shue – whom he is now dating – meet Dana's students to prepare for the show's Broadway opening, complete with original cast.

== Cast ==
- Steve Coogan as Dana Marschz
- Catherine Keener as Brie Marschz
- Amy Poehler as Cricket Feldstein
- David Arquette as Gary
- Elisabeth Shue as herself
- Marshall Bell as Principal Rocker
- Skylar Astin as Rand Posin
- Phoebe Strole as Epiphany Sellars
- Melonie Diaz as Ivonne
- Joseph Julian Soria as Octavio Marquez
- Arnie Pantoja as Vitamin J
- Nat Faxon as Glenn from Copy Shop
- Natalie Amenula as Yolanda
- Michael Esparza as Chuy
- Shea Pepe as Noah Sapperstein
- Arlin Alcala as Protestant

== Production ==
The play shown within the film was written on deadline for production. The film was budgeted at a little over $9 million. Production began in September 2007 in New Mexico.

Filming took place mainly at West Mesa High School in Albuquerque, where actual students were permitted to perform as extras in the film. Filming concluded on October 31, 2007. The film was executive produced by Albert Berger and Ron Yerxa, who also produced Little Miss Sunshine.

== Release ==
A rough edit of Hamlet 2 was prepared for the 2008 Sundance Film Festival, where it was a late addition, three days prior to its scheduled screening. The film premiered at the festival on January 21, 2008. After the screening, an all-night bidding war took place for worldwide distribution rights, Focus Features won for $10 million, beating out other studios such as Summit Entertainment, The Weinstein Company, Lionsgate and Warner Independent Pictures. The purchase of Hamlet 2 nearly met the Sundance record set by Little Miss Sunshine, which sold for $10.5 million in 2006. In wide release, the film grossed roughly half of the rights cost.

The film had a limited release on August 22, 2008, followed by a wide release on August 27. Its UK release was originally scheduled for December 28, 2008, postponed until February 27, 2009, and eventually cancelled.

=== Home media ===
The DVD was released December 21, 2008. The DVD includes deleted scenes, an audio commentary, and a sing-along.

The film was also released as part of a four movie, "teen-comedy" collection from Universal in 2011.

== Critical response ==
On Rotten Tomatoes the film has an approval rating of 62%, based on 145 reviews, with the site's critical consensus reading, "The script's biting premise and Steve Coogan's endearing, off-the-handle performance make Hamlet 2 a hysterical -- if slightly painful -- ride." On Metacritic, the film has a score of 54 out of 100, based on reviews from 28 critics, indicating "mixed or average" reviews.

Roger Ebert gave the film 3 out of 4 stars, calling the film "an ideal showcase for the talents of Coogan." The New York Times states that the film "made sure to take shots at Christians, gays, Latinos, Jews, the American Civil Liberties Union, and Elisabeth Shue, one of its lead actresses."

Duane Byrge of The Hollywood Reporter described Hamlet 2 as "a slam-bang patchwork of more inspired comedies, such as Ace Ventura: Pet Detective and Borat." Byrge described the premise as "a twist on the formula of let's-put-on-a-show, with the twist being that no one wants the show." He thought that the screenwriters had put together "a string of gags in a hit-and-miss dither."
