= Barefoot (2014 film) =

2014 film by Andrew Fleming

- Theatrical release poster
- Directed by: Andrew Fleming
- Written by: Stephen Zotnowski
- Produced by: Lisa Demetree; David Scharf
- Starring: Evan Rachel Wood; Scott Speedman; Treat Williams; Kate Burton; J. K. Simmons
- Cinematography: Alexander Gruszynski
- Edited by: Tara Timpone
- Music by: Michael Penn
- Production company: WhiteFlame Productions
- Distributed by: Roadside Attractions
- Release dates: February 2, 2014 (SBIFF); February 21, 2014 (limited)
- Running time: 89 minutes
- Country: United States
- Language: English
- Budget: $7.4 million
- Box office: $15,071

Barefoot is a 2014 American romantic comedy film directed by Andrew Fleming and distributed by Roadside Attractions. It was written by Stephen Zotnowski and is technically a "remake" of the 2005 German film Barfuss despite the fact that Barfuss was itself based on Zotnowski's original story and screenplay "Barefoot". It stars Evan Rachel Wood, Scott Speedman, Treat Williams, Kate Burton and J. K. Simmons. The story follows Jay Wheeler, the son of a wealthy family who meets Daisy, a psychiatric patient who was raised in isolation, as he takes her home for his brother's wedding.

The film was produced by WhiteFlame Productions and premiered at the Santa Barbara International Film Festival on February 2, 2014. It received a limited theatrical release and was simultaneously released to Video on demand on February 21, 2014. It grossed a total of $15,071. It received negative reviews from critics.

== Plot ==
Jay Wheeler, the "black sheep" of a rich family, works as a janitor at a Los Angeles psychiatric hospital as part of his probation. One night, he overhears another janitor Frakel telling a patient that he is a doctor in order to rape her. Jay knocks him out and tells the patient, Daisy Kensington, to go back to sleep.

Daisy, having been admitted to the hospital after being raised in isolation and barefoot all her life, follows Jay. Rather than send her back, he brings her home for his brother's wedding in New Orleans to convince his family that he has straightened out his life. While Daisy impresses them, she also tells Jay that she was in the hospital for killing her mother.

Jay's father, suspecting that something is amiss, presses her for information, causing Daisy to have a panic attack. Jay gets her into a cab, and tells them the truth, that he had come home to get money to pay back a loan shark. Jay and Daisy return to his parents' house, and set out back home in his father's vintage RV.

Despite the fact that they are both being hunted, they enjoy each other's company. They pull over so he can sleep and, during the night, Daisy wakes him when a cop pulls up. While Jay hides in the cupboard, she tells the officer that her boyfriend, "Beaver", ran away when he saw the flashing lights. Telling her that his father's name was Beaver, he proceeds to check the RV. While he searches in the bushes on the side of the road for "Beaver", Daisy uses the distraction to throw away the keys to his car, so they can escape.

Later, when they make a stop, Jay phones Dr. Bertleman, the doctor who was handling Daisy. When she overhears him saying that he is taking her back to the psychiatric hospital, she runs out to the RV alone. Attempting to drive away before Jay can get to her, Daisy crashes it instead. As he opens the door, she climbs out crying, as others come to check on them.

Jay, curious about Daisy and not truly believing she is schizophrenic as Dr. Bertleman does, asks her if the voices told her to kill her mother. She tells him that it was not her, but her mother who heard voices. Daisy explains that one night her mother was screaming but she did not go to her. When she awoke in the morning, she found her mother dead, causing her to believe she killed her. Then, several police cars turn up, detaining Daisy and arresting Jay.

Jay's mother convinces her husband to bail Jay out, just as his father had once done for him. Returning to his apartment, Jay's belongings have been torn apart by the loan shark, who has come to collect his debt. Jay flees to the psychiatric hospital to see Daisy, but security and Dr. Bertleman turn him away.

Desperate, Jay goes to the train station, lying down on the tracks so he is deemed suicidal and taken to the psychiatric hospital. Dr. Bertleman, knowing it is a ruse, dismisses Jay. When he insists that he is suicidal, the doctor puts him in an isolation room. While there, another patient gives Jay information on Daisy's well-being and confirms that they are being kept apart.

Frakel sneaks the loan shark's goon into the hospital, where he then starts to strangle Jay with a chain. As Jay is struggling to get him off, the patient who had helped him takes the thug out by hitting him in the head with a broom.

After this, Jay wakes up in the hospital. There Dr. Bertleman apologizes to him about Frakel and tells him he was right about Daisy's mother, who was schizophrenic. The doctor then releases them both from the hospital.

Jay receives a letter from his father, containing a $40,000 check to pay off his debts and asking him to return to New Orleans. He then meets Daisy at the hospital entrance, where they embrace before leaving together.

== Cast ==
- Evan Rachel Wood as Daisy Kensington
- Scott Speedman as Jay Wheeler
- Treat Williams as Mr. Wheeler
- Kate Burton as Mrs. Wheeler
- J. K. Simmons as Dr. Bertleman
- Ricky Wayne as Mr. Frakel
- Thomas Francis Murphy as Mr. Bryant

== Production ==
The film is an English language remake of the 2005 German film by Til Schweiger.

== Release ==
It received a limited theatrical release from Roadside Attractions on February 21, 2014, and was simultaneously released on demand. It grossed $11,767 during its opening weekend and $15,071 total.

== Reception ==
On the review aggregator website Rotten Tomatoes, 19% of 21 critics' reviews are positive, with an average rating of 4.2/10. The website's consensus reads: "Caution when walking Barefoot: This all-too-disturbing attempt at levity painfully stumbles thanks to an oblivious cast." Metacritic, which uses a weighted average, assigned the film a score of 22 out of 100, based on 12 critics, indicating "generally unfavorable" reviews.

Barbara VanDenburgh of the Arizona Republic rated the film 1.5 out of 5 and called the it an "offensively infantilizing [...] spectacularly wrong-headed, chemistry-free romance, and too dumb to know how sexist it is" and calling Evan Rachel Wood's character "a cartoon character" similar to the Little Mermaid who "all but brushes her hair with a fork". Variety bemoaned the return of the adorable mental illness genre and called the film "slick but charm-free".
