= The Michael J. Fox Show =

American television sitcom (2013–2014)

- Genre: Sitcom
- Created by: Will Gluck; Sam Laybourne
- Starring: Michael J. Fox; Betsy Brandt; Wendell Pierce; Katie Finneran; Juliette Goglia; Conor Romero; Jack Gore; Ana Nogueira
- Composer: Jeff Cardoni
- Country of origin: United States
- Original language: English
- No. of seasons: 1
- No. of episodes: 22 (7 unaired in the U.S.)

Production
- Executive producers: Alex Reid; Richard Schwartz; Sam Laybourne; Michael J. Fox; Will Gluck
- Camera setup: Single-camera
- Running time: 20 minutes
- Production companies: Olive Bridge Entertainment; Sam Laybourne Inc.; Sony Pictures Television

Original release
- Network: NBC
- Release: September 26, 2013 – January 23, 2014

The Michael J. Fox Show is an American television sitcom starring Michael J. Fox, that aired on NBC from September 26, 2013, to January 23, 2014. Fox made his regular return to television for the first time since he was on ABC's Spin City. It was his second NBC series, as he appeared on that network's sitcom Family Ties from 1982 to 1989 as Alex P. Keaton.

On February 5, 2014, NBC pre-empted the series due to the 2014 Winter Olympics. A representative for NBC later stated in regard to the show, "It's not cancelled. We are looking for a place on the schedule after April 3." Despite this, the remaining episodes never aired in the U.S. and, on May 10, 2014, NBC officially cancelled the show after one season. The remaining seven episodes were aired in Australia on Nine Network from March 12 to April 23, 2014.

== Premise ==
After being diagnosed with Parkinson's disease, Mike Henry had to give up his career as a news anchor for New York's WNBC and focus on his health and his family. Four years later, Mike decides to get back to work and struggles between family and career.

== Cast and characters ==
=== Main ===
- Michael J. Fox as Michael "Mike" Henry
- Betsy Brandt as Annie Henry, Mike's wife
- Wendell Pierce as Harris Green, Mike's boss and best friend
- Katie Finneran as Leigh Henry, Mike's sister
- Juliette Goglia as Eve Henry, Mike's and Annie's daughter
- Conor Romero as Ian Henry, Mike's and Annie's elder son
- Jack Gore as Graham Henry, Mike's and Annie's younger son
- Ana Nogueira as Kay Costa, Mike's assistant

=== Recurring ===
- Anne Heche as Susan Rodriguez-Jones, Mike's coworker
- Jason Kravits as Doug, Mike's coworker
- Peter Vack as Andreas
- Brooke Shields as Deborah, Ian's girlfriend
- Craig Bierko as Bill, the Henrys' neighbor
- David Furr as Andy, the Henrys' doorman
- Alice Kremelberg as Reese, Ian's girlfriend (later ex)

=== Guest ===
- Tracy Pollan as Kelly, the Henrys' neighbor
- Christopher Lloyd as Principal McTavish, Annie's coworker
- Candice Bergen as Beth Henry, Mike and Leigh's mother
- Charles Grodin as Steve Henry, Mike and Leigh's father
- Richard Kind as Mr. Norwood, the Henrys' neighbor and a former mobster
- Vandit Bhatt as Kevin, Kay's ex-fiancé
- Sting as himself
- Chris Christie as himself
- Matt Lauer as himself
- Al Roker as himself

== Episodes ==
No.	Title	Directed by	Written by	Original release date	Prod. code	U.S. viewers (millions)
1	"Pilot"	Will Gluck	Story by : Sam Laybourne & Will Gluck; Teleplay by : Sam Laybourne	September 26, 2013	1001	7.50
After retiring from working as a newscaster to focus on his health and to spend more time with his family, Mike Henry returns to work. Mike's daughter Eve makes a video project comparing the book The Grapes of Wrath to her father's returning to work.
2	"Neighbor"	Victor Nelli, Jr.	Lon Zimmet & Dan Rubin	September 26, 2013	1005	7.50
Mike develops a crush on his new upstairs neighbor Kelly (Tracy Pollan, Fox's wife in real life), a newly divorced woman. Eve tries to become best friends with a girl (Alice Kremelberg) she thinks is a lesbian. Leigh pretends that Graham is her son to bond with other single mothers.
3	"Art"	Andrew Fleming	Amy Aniobi	October 3, 2013	1009	5.35
Eve takes up nude photography, much to Mike and Annie's chagrin. Ian gets bad relationship advice from Harris, which Leigh tries to fix. Graham learns a technique to stay out of trouble.
4	"Hobbies"	Scott Ellis	Sam Laybourne	October 10, 2013	1002	3.86
Mike and Annie try to get Graham into an afterschool hobby. Susan Rodriguez Jones (Anne Heche), a mean news reporter that Mike previously worked with, gets a job at WNBC. Ian and Leigh help Eve deal with a cyberbully.
5	"Interns"	Michael Patrick Jann	Emily Cutler	October 17, 2013	1007	3.56
Eve gets an internship at WNBC working for Susan, which makes Mike jealous. Annie has a hard time telling Leigh that the teen novel that she is writing is terrible. With help from Graham, Ian interviews potential interns for his new upstart business.
6	"Teammates"	John Fortenberry	Ben Wexler	October 24, 2013	1003	3.76
After Mike has apologized to a rude stranger for Annie's hot-headed behavior, she demands he be more of a team player. Harris hosts an office karaoke party. Leigh adopts a puppy with good intentions, but Eve is left in charge. Meanwhile, Ian, still stuck in Graham's tiny old bedroom, tries to convince his brother to switch back.
7	"Golf"	Fred Savage	Annie Mebane & Steve Basilone	October 31, 2013	1004	3.34
Mike is asked to play in a charity golf tournament, so he and Annie decide to make it a romantic getaway weekend. Another celebrity golfer (Jason Jones) becomes the bane of his existence. The kids rent out their home to make money while their parents are gone.
8	"Bed Bugs"	Wendey Stanzler	Alex Reid	November 7, 2013	1006	3.45
Mike's love for his sister, Leigh, is put to the test when a bed bug infestation forces her to move in with his family. Meanwhile, Eve has trouble getting out of a practical joke she's played on her brother Ian.
9	"Homecoming"	Tristram Shapeero	Maggie Bandur	November 14, 2013	1008	2.53
Graham starts throwing away things his parents no longer use after they clear his room of toys that he no longer plays with. Ian plans for a high school dance instead of thinking of college. Eve tells Leigh a secret, which upsets Annie.
10	"Thanksgiving"	Alex Reid	Paul Mather	November 21, 2013	1010	2.89
Mike's parents (Charles Grodin and Candice Bergen) visit for Thanksgiving, much to Leigh's, and later Annie's, discontent. Eve and Harris search for a can of cranberry sauce, finding out it's not as easy as it seems.
11	"Christmas"	Todd Holland	Ben Wexler	December 12, 2013	1012	3.00
Mike and Annie compete to get each other the best Christmas gift. Eve thinks about converting to Judaism. Special guest: Sting.
12	"Party"	Eric Appel	Lelia Strachan	January 2, 2014	1011	2.50
Mike throws a party for Harris to celebrate a journalism award, but he has to pretend Harris is engaged so his friends will attend. Meanwhile, Ian gets Eve to help him save Graham's party from Annie's overprotectiveness.
13	"Secret"	Michael Zinberg	Lon Zimmet & Dan Rubin	January 9, 2014	1013	3.11
Mike's neighbor (Richard Kind) turns out to be a mobster on the lam who he has known for fifteen years. Harris and Leigh's relationship progresses. The kids try to find out what is in an owl the mobster neighbor left.
14	"Couples"	Ken Whittingham	Maggie Bandur	January 16, 2014	1014	1.99
Mike and Annie befriend their new neighbors and Harris gets jealous. Eve pretends to have a very troubled family to impress a guy. Graham thinks Ian is a spy.
15	"Sochi"	Andrew Fleming	Paul Mather	January 23, 2014	1016	2.18
Mike covers the Olympics. Eve joins a pageant.
16	"Surprise!"	Jamie Sheridan	Steve Basilone & Annie Mebane	Unaired (United States); March 12, 2014 (Australia)	1015	N/A
Mike tries to surprise his sister on her birthday; Annie worries that a young teacher reciprocates Eve's crush.
17	"Co-op"	Michael McDonald	Leila Strachan	Unaired (United States); March 19, 2014 (Australia)	1017	N/A
Mike enlists a neighbor to run against Annie for co-op president. Ian throws himself into work to recover from a recent breakup, while Leigh wonders how to approach her date with a literary agent.
18	"Biking"	Andrew Fleming	Amy Aniobi	Unaired (United States); March 26, 2014 (Australia)	1019	N/A
While Mike teaches Graham to ride his bike for the first time, Ian is about to learn a thing or two from someone with a lot more experience.
19	"Health"	John Fortenberry	Laura Kittrell	Unaired (United States); April 2, 2014 (Australia)	1018	N/A
It's a Back to the Future reunion, when Christopher Lloyd plays Annie's kooky new boss.
20	"Brandon"	Scott Ellis	Sam Laybourne & Kristen Lange	Unaired (United States); April 9, 2014 (Australia)	1020	N/A
Mike and Annie try to keep Leigh from reuniting with an ex, Graham tricks Eve into spending more time with him, while Ian worries that an older woman only wants him for sex.
21	"Dinner"	Victor Nelli, Jr.	Lon Zimmet & Dan Rubin	Unaired (United States); April 16, 2014 (Australia)	1022	N/A
While Mike and Annie are surprised by the age of the girlfriend that Ian brings home, Harris and Leigh struggle to be just friends and Eve experiments with marijuana.
22	"Changes"	Andrew Fleming	Sam Laybourne & Alex Reid	Unaired (United States); April 23, 2014 (Australia)	1021	N/A
Annie and Eve square off when Ian plans to move out. Harris plans to propose to Leigh but hits a snag.

== Production and development ==
In August 2012, NBC gave a straight-to-series order for the series.

== Broadcast ==
In Australia, the series premiered on Universal Channel on January 15, 2014.

== Home media ==
On July 7, 2015, Sony Pictures Home Entertainment released The Michael J. Fox Show - The Complete 1st Season on DVD in Region 1.

== Reception ==
=== Critical response ===
The show had a positive reception from critics, with many praising Michael J. Fox and Betsy Brandt's performances. It was called one of six new shows to keep an eye on of the 2013-14 television season by Entertainment Weekly. The New York Times found the show distinctly unfunny, remarking that something felt "off".

In Australia the series premiered in double episodes, each scoring the highest rated overnight subscription television figures of the night (77,000 and 73,000 respectively). However, successive episodes saw a significant drop in ratings.

=== Awards and nominations ===
On June 25, 2013, the series was honored, along with five others, with the Critics' Choice Television Award for Most Exciting New Series. Fox was nominated for a Golden Globe.
