= Andrew Fleming =

American film director and screenwriter (born 1963)

- Born: March 14, 1963 (age 63); New York City, New York, United States
- Occupations: Screenwriter, film director, television producer, television director, film producer, actor, television writer
- Years active: 1988–present
- Notable work: Bad Dreams, The Craft, Hamlet 2, Ideal Home
- Awards: FilmOut San Diego Audience Award – Best Actor and Best Comedy (2018)

Andrew Fleming (born March 14, 1963) is an American screenwriter, film director, television producer, television director, film producer, actor, and television writer. He directed and wrote or co-wrote the films Bad Dreams, Threesome, The Craft, Dick, Nancy Drew, Hamlet 2, Barefoot, and Ideal Home, and directed The In-Laws remake. He has also directed episodes of the television series Arrested Development and Grosse Pointe, among others.

== Early life and education ==
Fleming grew up in Los Angeles, California, and studied filmmaking at New York University film school, after early involvement with film and television projects during high school.

== Career ==
In 1988, Fleming made his feature film debut with the supernatural slasher Bad Dreams, which he co‑wrote and directed. The film starred Jennifer Rubin, Bruce Abbott, E. G. Daily, Dean Cameron, Harris Yulin, and Richard Lynch.

In 1993, Fleming co‑wrote the screenplay for the thriller Every Breath, directed by Steve Bing. The film was produced by Motion Picture Corporation of America and starred Judd Nelson, Joanna Pacuła, and Patrick Bauchau.

In 1994, Fleming wrote and directed the erotic dramedy film, Threesome, starring Lara Flynn Boyle, Stephen Baldwin, and Josh Charles. Partly based on his college experiences, it combined autobiographical elements with social commentary and received an R rating from the Motion Picture Association of America.

In 1996, Fleming directed the teen supernatural horror film The Craft, co‑written with Peter Filardi. The film starred Robin Tunney, Fairuza Balk, Neve Campbell, and Rachel True as four outcast teenage girls at a Los Angeles parochial high school who pursue witchcraft, with consequences.

In 1999, Fleming directed the alternate history comedy film Dick, co‑written with Sheryl Longin. Starring Kirsten Dunst, Michelle Williams, and Dan Hedaya, the film portrayed a comic reimagining of the Watergate scandal, in which two teenage friends inadvertently become the figure known as "Deep Throat," which ended the presidency of Richard Nixon.

Fleming next directed the 2003 action comedy The In-Laws, a remake of the 1979 cult classic. Starring Michael Douglas, Albert Brooks, Robin Tunney, Ryan Reynolds, and Candice Bergen, the film was shot on location in Chicago. It received mixed to negative reviews and was a box office failure.

Fleming returned in 2007 with the mystery comedy Nancy Drew, based on the novel series Nancy Drew. Starring Emma Roberts in the title role alongside Josh Flitter and Max Thieriot, the film follows Nancy as she relocates to Los Angeles with her father and becomes involved in solving a cold case surrounding the death of a movie star. It was released by Warner Bros. Pictures.

Next year, Fleming directed the comedy Hamlet 2 (2008), co‑written with Pam Brady and starring Steve Coogan, Catherine Keener, Amy Poehler, and David Arquette. The film was shot primarily at a New Mexico high school in late 2007. It premiered at the 2008 Sundance Film Festival and was distributed by Focus Features.

After a series of comedy films in the 2000s, Fleming also worked on television shows such as Grosse Pointe and Arrested Development, and acting projects including a role in Fired Up!, before returning in 2014 with the romantic comedy Barefoot, starring Evan Rachel Wood and Scott Speedman. Based on Stephen Zotnowski’s original story and screenplay, it was distributed by Roadside Attractions. The film was produced by WhiteFlame Productions and premiered at the Santa Barbara International Film Festival on February 2, 2014.

Between 2014 and 2018, Fleming continued working on television shows, including The Michael J. Fox Show (2013–14) and Younger (2016–18), before returning with the comedy-drama Ideal Home, starring Steve Coogan, Paul Rudd, Alison Pill, Jake McDorman, and Jack Gore. The film was released in the United States on June 29, 2018, following its earlier screening at the Mardi Gras Film Festival on February 15, 2018.

From 2018 to 2022, as part of his ongoing professional work in film and television, Fleming produced and directed episodes of shows including Insatiable, Dolly Parton's Heartstrings, Emily in Paris, and Uncoupled. He was also credited during this period as an executive producer on The Craft: Legacy, a supernatural horror film written and directed by Zoe Lister-Jones as a legacy sequel to Fleming’s 1996 film The Craft.

== Personal life ==
Fleming is gay, and based his 2018 film Ideal Home on his own experiences as a gay parent, helping to raise the son of his partner of 23 years.

== Filmography ==
=== Films ===
| Year | Title | Director | Writer | Executive producer | Ref. |
|---|---|---|---|---|---|
| 1988 | Bad Dreams | Yes | Yes | No | |
| 1993 | Every Breath | No | Yes | No | |
| 1994 | Threesome | Yes | Yes | No | |
| 1996 | The Craft | Yes | Yes | No | |
| 1999 | Dick | Yes | Yes | No | |
| 2003 | The In-Laws | Yes | No | No | |
| 2007 | Nancy Drew | Yes | Yes | No | |
| 2008 | Hamlet 2 | Yes | Yes | Yes | |
| 2014 | Barefoot | Yes | No | No | |
| 2018 | Ideal Home | Yes | Yes | No | |
| 2020 | The Craft: Legacy | No | No | Yes | |

Acting

| Year | Title | Role | Ref. |
|---|---|---|---|
| 2009 | Fired Up! | Klete Vanderjack | |
| 2010 | Easy A | Doctor | |
| 2011 | Friends with Benefits | Driver | |
| 2014 | Annie | Cleve Sweetzer | |

=== Television shows ===
| Year | Title | Director | Producer | Notes | Ref. |
|---|---|---|---|---|---|
| 2000–01 | Grosse Pointe | Yes | Consulting | 16 episodes | |
| 2005 | Arrested Development | Yes | No | Episode: "Queen for a Day" | |
| 2005 | Head Cases | Yes | No | Episode: "Pilot" | |
| 2007 | The Loop | Yes | No | Episode: "Windows" | |
| 2011 | Franklin & Bash | Yes | No | 2 episodes | |
| 2013 | Wedding Band | Yes | No | Episode: "99 Problems" | |
| 2013 | New Girl | Yes | No | Episode: "The Box" | |
| 2013–14 | The Michael J. Fox Show | Yes | No | 4 episodes | |
| 2014–15 | Bad Judge | Yes | No | 4 episodes | |
| 2015 | Odd Mom Out | Yes | Executive | 4 episodes | |
| 2015 | Difficult People | Yes | No | Episode: "Library Water" | |
| 2015 | Red Oaks | Yes | No | 2 episodes | |
| 2016 | Lady Dynamite | Yes | No | 2 episodes | |
| 2016–18 | Younger | Yes | No | 7 episodes | |
| 2018–19 | Insatiable | Yes | Executive | 8 episodes | |
| 2019 | Dolly Parton's Heartstrings | Yes | No | Episode: "Jolene" | |
| 2020–present | Emily in Paris | Yes | Executive | Seasons 1-4 | |
| 2022 | Uncoupled | Yes | No | 4 episodes | |

TV movies

| Year | Title | Director | Producer | Writer | Ref. |
|---|---|---|---|---|---|
| 2002 | Paranormal Girl | Yes | Yes | Yes | |
| 2009 | No Heroics | Yes | No | No | |

== Awards and nominations ==
| Year | Award | Category | Nominee | Result | Ref. |
|---|---|---|---|---|---|
| 2009 | Gold Derby Awards | Original Song | Hamlet 2 | Nominated | |
| 2009 | OFTA Film Awards | Best Music, Original Song | Hamlet 2 | Nominated | |
| 2014 | Santa Barbara International Film Festival | Panavision Spirit Award for International Camera | Barefoot | Nominated | |
| 2018 | Edinburgh International Film Festival | Audience Award | Ideal Home | Nominated | |
| 2018 | FilmOut San Diego Audience Award | Best Actor and Best Comedy | Ideal Home | Won | |
