= Dick (film) =

1999 comedy film by Andrew Fleming

- Theatrical release poster
- Directed by: Andrew Fleming
- Written by: Andrew Fleming; Sheryl Longin
- Produced by: Gale Anne Hurd
- Starring: Kirsten Dunst; Michelle Williams; Dave Foley; Harry Shearer; Dan Hedaya
- Cinematography: Alexander Gruszynski
- Edited by: Mia Goldman
- Music by: John Debney
- Production companies: Columbia Pictures; Phoenix Pictures
- Distributed by: Sony Pictures Releasing
- Release date: August 4, 1999
- Running time: 94 minutes
- Countries: United States; Canada
- Language: English
- Budget: $13 million
- Box office: $6.3 million

Dick is a 1999 alternate history comedy film directed by Andrew Fleming, co-written by Fleming and Sheryl Longin, and starring Kirsten Dunst, Michelle Williams, and Dan Hedaya. It portrays a comic reimagining of the Watergate scandal which ended the presidency of Richard Nixon, in which two warm-hearted but unworldly 15-year-old friends, who—through various arbitrary circumstances—become the legendary "Deep Throat" figure who played a key role in bringing down the presidency of Nixon. At the time of the film's release, the real identity of Deep Throat was not yet known to the public.

The film features several cast members from Saturday Night Live and The Kids in the Hall, and includes fictionalized portrayals of American historical and political figures involved in the Watergate scandal, including Henry Kissinger, Bob Woodward, Carl Bernstein, H. R. Haldeman, John Dean, G. Gordon Liddy, and Rose Mary Woods.

Released on August 4, 1999 by Sony Pictures Releasing, Dick was a box-office bomb, grossing $6.3 million against a $13 million budget, though it received largely favorable reviews from film critics. In the years following its release, the film went on to develop a cult following.

== Plot ==
Betsy Jobs and Arlene Lorenzo are two sweet-natured, ditzy teenagers living in Washington, D.C., in 1972. Betsy comes from a wealthy Georgetown family, while Arlene lives with her widowed mother in an apartment in the Watergate building.

On the night of the Watergate break-in, the girls sneak out of Arlene's home to mail a letter to enter a contest to win a date with teen idol singer Bobby Sherman. They sneak through the parking garage by taping the latch of a door, accidentally causing the break-in to be discovered. Seen by G. Gordon Liddy, they panic and run. The security guard is startled by the taped door and calls the police, who immediately arrest the burglars.

The next day, at the White House on a school tour, they happen across Liddy again. They do not recognize him, but he recognizes them and becomes suspicious. He points them out to H. R. Haldeman, who interrogates them. Their conversation (revealing the girls do not think about the president much) is interrupted by a phone call from his wife, and then by President Nixon himself, who takes Haldeman aside to complain about the bugging operation being fouled up.

The girls are awestruck at being in the same room as Nixon – but more so at being able to play with his dog, which gives him an idea. To keep their silence, he appoints them his official dogwalkers – which means they must be admitted repeatedly to the White House. On these visits they accidentally influence major events such as the Vietnam peace process and the Nixon–Brezhnev accord, by bringing along cookies that they have inadvertently baked marijuana into.

Later, when Betsy's brother, Larry, reveals the cookies' "secret ingredient" and hears the President ate them, he concludes that this explains Nixon's paranoia. The girls become familiar with the Nixon administration's key players, including Henry Kissinger, and accidentally learn the major secrets of the Watergate scandal.

Arlene, previously infatuated with Bobby Sherman, now falls equally hard for the president. Just after reading an 18½-minute message of love into his tape recorder, she plays back another part of the tape, hears his coarse, brutal rantings, and realizes his true nature. When they confront Nixon, he fires and threatens them.

They now reevaluate what they have learned and decide to reveal everything to the "radical muckraking bastards" (Nixon's words) at The Washington Post, Bob Woodward and Carl Bernstein. So they become informants: two 15-year-old girls are the true identity of the famous Deep Throat (Betsy's brother had just been caught watching the film of the same name).

Woodward and Bernstein – portrayed as petty, childish, and incompetent – are naturally skeptical of the two girls. To make matters worse, their only piece of physical evidence, a list of names of those involved from the Committee to Re-Elect the President, is eaten by Betsy's dog.

Nixon's men realize the girls are a real threat and attempt tactics such as bugging and undercover agents to discover what they know, going so far as to break into Betsy's house and plant an agent as Arlene's mother's boyfriend. Eventually pushed to the limit after being chased by the Watergate "plumbers", they decide to take action.

Sneaking into Haldeman's house, the girls find and take a crucial tape recording. They give a transcription of it to Woodward and Bernstein (keeping the tape as a "souvenir"), thus ending Nixon's political career. Nixon finds Arlene's message on his tape and erases it, reasoning that he would be "crucified" if it was perceived that he had an affair with a 15-year-old girl.

Following his resignation, as his helicopter flies over Betsy's house, the girls hold up a sign with the phrase "You suck, Dick", further angering the now ex-president.

== Cast ==
- Kirsten Dunst as Betsy Jobs
- Michelle Williams as Arlene Lorenzo
- Dan Hedaya as President Richard "Dick" Nixon
- Will Ferrell as Bob Woodward
- Bruce McCulloch as Carl Bernstein
- Teri Garr as Helen Lorenzo
- Dave Foley as H. R. Haldeman
- Jim Breuer as John Dean
- Ana Gasteyer as Rose Mary Woods
- Harry Shearer as G. Gordon Liddy
- Saul Rubinek as Henry Kissinger
- Devon Gummersall as Larry Jobs
- Ted McGinley as Roderick
- Ryan Reynolds as Chip
- G. D. Spradlin as Ben Bradlee
- Karl Pruner as Frank Jobs
- French Stewart as the interviewer

== Production ==
=== Development ===
Writers Andrew Fleming and Sheryl Longin attempted to write several different scripts with teenage girls as protagonists. The idea of using the Watergate scandal came from a real-life experience Longin had with Nixon when her family stayed at the same hotel as Nixon. As a child, she and a friend pelted Nixon with ice cubes, causing a minor disturbance. Fleming said that he was surprised at the attempts to rehabilitate Nixon's image, and Longin cited the Watergate scandal as a defining political moment for their generation. She said she channeled the resulting anger and cynicism into the script. Several people told the duo that various gags went too far. Fleming, who believed Nixon got off easily, said they fought to keep everything.

=== Casting ===
Fleming and Longin approached Ben Bradlee and John Dean to play themselves, but both declined. Fleming cast Dunst based on her performance in Interview with the Vampire (1994). Fleming recalled of pairing Dunst and Michelle Williams: "Michelle and Kirsten did a little session together, and they were just hilarious and adorable and good. It took a long time to get the script sold and together, and then [the film itself] came together very, very quickly because Michelle had to go back to Dawson’s Creek."

=== Filming ===
Principal photography of Dick took place in the summer of 1998 in the Toronto area, with some additional photography occurring in Washington, D.C.

== Release ==
Sony's marketing research indicated teenage girls were the film's biggest demographic, so promotional material focused on Dunst and Williams instead of the political aspects. Dick was released in the United States on August 4, 1999.

=== Home media ===
On December 14, 1999, Dick was released on VHS and DVD by Columbia TriStar Home Video. (Note: Renamed Columbia TriStar Home Entertainment in April 2001, then Sony Pictures Home Entertainment between November 2004 and March 2005.) Eighteen years later, on November 6, 2018, it was released on Blu-ray by Sony Pictures Home Entertainment.

== Reception ==
=== Box office ===
Dick was a box-office bomb. It earned $2,210,267 during its opening weekend in the United States across 1,522 theaters, By the end of its theatrical run, it grossed a total of $6,262,878 against a $13 million budget.

=== Critical response ===
On the review aggregator website Rotten Tomatoes, 72% of 74 critics' reviews are positive. The website's consensus reads: "A clever, funny slice of alternate history, Dick farcically re-imagines the Watergate era and largely succeeds, thanks to quirky, winning performances from Michelle Williams, Kirsten Dunst and Will Ferrell." Metacritic, which uses a weighted average, assigned the film a score of 65 out of 100, based on 21 critics, indicating "generally favorable" reviews.

Leonard Maltin gave the film three stars, calling it a "clever cross of Clueless and All the President’s Men". Todd McCarthy, in his review for Variety, called it an "audacious, imaginative political comedy" that will appeal more to adults than teenagers. Stephen Holden of The New York Times described it as "an uproariously dizzy satire" that was inspired by the Lewinsky scandal. Roger Ebert awarded the film 3.5 out of 4 stars, praising the historical references and performance, adding: "Comedy like this depends on timing, invention and a cheerful cynicism about human nature. [Dick] is wiser and more wicked than the gross-out insult humor of many of the summer’s other comedies."

Writing for the Los Angeles Times, Kevin Thomas said the film "is so sharp and funny it should appeal to all ages". Rita Kempley of The Washington Post described it as "more fun than you ever thought you'd have with Richard Nixon". The film's acting received critical commentary. Thomas positively compared Hedaya's performance to Anthony Hopkins in Nixon, and Kempley called Hedaya "no less adept" than Hopkins. Holden wrote that Hedaya's portrayal of Nixon is "the year's funniest film caricature". Thomas called Dunst and Williams "a constant delight".

=== Awards ===
Year	Award	Category	Subject	Result
2000	Satellite Awards	Best Motion Picture, Comedy or Musical	Dick	Nominated
2000	Satellite Awards	Best Performance by an Actor in a Supporting Role, Comedy or Musical	Dan Hedaya	Nominated
2000	Young Artist Awards	Best Performance in a Feature Film - Leading Young Actress	Michelle Williams	Nominated
2000	YoungStar Award	Best Young Actress/Performance in a Motion Picture Comedy	Kirsten Dunst	Nominated

== Soundtrack ==
Original Motion Picture Soundtrack: Dick

Soundtrack album by various artists
- Released: 1999
- Recorded: Ocean Way, Nashville (track 1 only)
- Genre: 1970s popular music
- Length: 50:29
- Label: Virgin
- Producer: Ralph Sall

All sixteen compositions are Top 40 hit songs from the 1970s, but two were not recorded until after the Watergate scandal had ended. They are "Lady Marmalade" and "Dancing Queen", which were released three months and two years later, respectively. Sixpence None the Richer's cover version of the latter song is the album's opening track and the only one recorded for the film.

Captain & Tennille's "Love Will Keep Us Together" had been considered for use in the film, but the politically conservative Daryl Dragon and Toni Tennille did not appreciate the film's irreverence and denied the rights to their cover. Led Zeppelin's "Over the Hills and Far Away" was originally intended to accompany the closing scene, but Fleming eventually realized Carly Simon's "You're So Vain" was a better fit and used it instead.

Track listing
No.	Title	Writer(s)	Performer	Length
1.	"Dancing Queen"	Benny Andersson, Björn Ulvaeus, Stig Anderson	Sixpence None the Richer	4:00
2.	"ABC"	Berry Gordy, Deke Richards, Alphonzo Mizell and Freddie Perren	The Jackson 5	2:57
3.	"Crocodile Rock"	Elton John, Bernie Taupin	Elton John	3:53
4.	"Lady Marmalade"	Bob Crewe, Kenny Nolan	Labelle	3:19
5.	"Rock On"	David Essex	David Essex	3:24
6.	"Hooked on a Feeling"	Mark James	Blue Swede	2:51
7.	"Popcorn"	Gershon Kingsley	Hot Butter	2:31
8.	"Rock Your Baby"	Harry Wayne Casey, Richard Finch	George McCrae	3:18
9.	"Love's Theme"	Barry White	The Love Unlimited Orchestra	3:33
10.	"Mr. Big Stuff"	Joseph Broussard, Carrol Washington, Ralph George Williams	Jean Knight	2:28
11.	"The Loco-Motion"	Gerry Goffin, Carole King	Grand Funk Railroad	2:45
12.	"Come and Get Your Love"	Lolly Vegas	Redbone	3:32
13.	"Coconut"	Harry Nilsson	Harry Nilsson	3:46
14.	"Brother Louie"	Errol Brown, Tony Wilson	Stories	3:55
15.	"You’re So Vain"	Carly Simon	Carly Simon	4:17
