= Insatiable (TV series) =

2018 American dark comedy-drama television series

- Genre: Dark comedy; Comedy drama; Teen drama
- Created by: Lauren Gussis
- Based on: "The Pageant King of Alabama" by Jeff Chu
- Starring: Dallas Roberts; Debby Ryan; Christopher Gorham; Sarah Colonna; Erinn Westbrook; Kimmy Shields; Michael Provost; Irene Choi; Alyssa Milano; Arden Myrin
- Narrated by: Debby Ryan; Dallas Roberts
- Composer: Julian Wass
- Country of origin: United States
- Original language: English
- No. of seasons: 2
- No. of episodes: 22

Production
- Executive producers: Lauren Gussis; Ryan Seacrest; Nina Wass; Andrea Shay; Todd Hoffman; Dennis Kim; Merrill Karpf; Andrew Fleming
- Cinematography: Alexander Gruszynski (ep 1); Walt Fraser
- Running time: 40–55 minutes
- Production companies: Lady Magic Productions; Storied Media Group; Ryan Seacrest Productions; CBS Television Studios

Original release
- Network: Netflix
- Release: August 10, 2018 – October 11, 2019

Insatiable is an American dark comedy drama television series created by Lauren Gussis, starring Dallas Roberts and Debby Ryan. It is based on Jeff Chu's article "The Pageant King of Alabama", published in July 2014 in The New York Times Magazine. The first season premiered on Netflix on August 10, 2018. In September 2018, the series was renewed for a second season, which premiered on October 11, 2019. On February 17, 2020, Netflix cancelled the series after two seasons.

The series received negative reviews from critics who called the show "offensive" and "insulting", with some praise being directed towards the performances and dark humor.

== Plot ==
Set in the fictional town of Masonville, Georgia, 17-year-old Patty Bladell is violently assaulted by a homeless man and consequently has her jaw wired shut, losing 70 pounds of weight for doing a liquid diet as a result. Before her senior year, she is taken under the wing of Bob Armstrong, a disgraced lawyer and beauty pageant coach. The two quickly become a recipe for disaster as Bob slowly realizes how deep Patty's rage runs and how far she will go to exact revenge on those she believes have wronged her.

== Cast and characters ==
=== Main ===
- Debby Ryan as Patty Bladell
- Dallas Roberts as Bob Armstrong Jr.
- Christopher Gorham as Bob Barnard
- Sarah Colonna as Angie Bladell
- Erinn Westbrook as Magnolia Barnard
- Kimmy Shields as Nonnie Thompson
- Michael Provost as Brick Armstrong
- Irene Choi as Dixie Sinclair
- Alyssa Milano as Coralee Huggins-Armstrong
- Arden Myrin as Regina Sinclair (season 2; recurring season 1)

=== Recurring ===
- Brett Rice as Robert Armstrong Sr.
- Daniel Kang as Donald Choi
- Jordan Gelber as Sheriff Hank Thompson (season 1)
- James Lastovic as Christian Keene (season 1; guest season 2)
- Chloe Bridges as Roxy Buckley (season 1; guest season 2)
- Beverly D'Angelo as Stella Rose Buckley (season 1; guest season 2)
- Michael Ian Black as Pastor Mike Keene (season 1; guest season 2)
- Ashley D. Kelley as Dee Marshall
- Caroline Pluta as Heather Kristina Pamela Kendall Jackson Johnson (season 2)
- Vincent Rodriguez III as Detective Rudy Cruz (season 2)
- Alex Landi as Henry Lee (season 2)

=== Guest ===
- Carly Hughes as Etta Mae Barnard (season 1)
- Robin Tunney as Brandylynn Huggens (season 1)
- Christine Taylor as Gail Keene (season 1)
- Jon Lovitz as Father Schwartz (season 1)
- William Baldwin (season 1) / Dana Ashbrook (season 2) as Gordy Greer
- Gloria Diaz as Gloria Reyes (season 2)
- Tommy Dorfman as Jonathan (season 2)
- Lucius Baston as Warden Winters (season 2)
- Lance Bass as Brazen Moorehead (season 2)

== Episodes ==
Season	Episodes	Originally released
1	12	August 10, 2018
2	10	October 11, 2019

=== Season 1 (2018) ===
No. overall	No. in season	Title	Directed by	Written by	Original release date
1	1	"Pilot"	Andrew Fleming	Lauren Gussis	August 10, 2018
High school student Patty Bladell is constantly bullied for being overweight, being nicknamed "Fatty Patty". After being rejected by classmate Brick Armstrong, on whom she has a crush, Patty sits outside a convenience store next to a homeless man, who insults her weight. When she punches him, he punches her back and she ends up in the hospital with a broken jaw. Three months later, Patty—who is now thin thanks to a liquid diet—is being prosecuted for assaulting the homeless man. After being disgraced on the pageant circuit, Bob Armstrong, a local civil rights lawyer and former pageant coach, is enlisted to take Patty's case pro bono. Upon meeting the new Patty, Bob sees her as his chance to return to the pageant world and decides to take her under his wing. Meanwhile, Patty develops strong feelings for Bob.
2	2	"Skinny Is Magic"	Andrew Fleming	Lauren Gussis & Jace Richdale	August 10, 2018
After receiving a makeover from Bob Armstrong, Patty navigates the first day of senior year, intent on using her newfound beauty to exact revenge on those who tormented her. Patty hears news of a man in critical condition following a fire at the same motel where she almost set the homeless man on fire the previous night, fearing she might have been responsible. Coralee Armstrong does damage control at Bob Barnard's house, after discovering that Bob Armstrong was nearly seduced by Magnolia Barnard. Bob Armstrong works on proving Patty's innocence as he learns from Bob Barnard that a bra and a matchbook were found in the burned motel room. The homeless man, John, eventually admits he accidentally started the fire and wanted Patty to take the blame in order to exonerate himself. When Patty confronts John, he mocks her. Patty then wishes death on John, who suddenly dies of a heart attack.
3	3	"Miss Bareback Buckaroo"	Andrew Fleming	Kari Drake & Craig Chester	August 10, 2018
Bob Armstrong takes Patty to the Miss Bareback Buckaroo pageant in Alabama to visit his former mentor, Stella Rose Buckley, who helped him enter the world of pageant coaching in the late 1990s. Worried about Patty, Nonnie Thompson takes a road trip to Alabama with Donald Choi and Dixie Sinclair. Coralee tries to increase her chances of being inducted into the Junior League by organizing a dinner party, only to have her plans thwarted by an unwelcome visit from her trailer-trash sister, Brandylynn. Stella Rose agrees to assist Bob in teaching Patty how to behave properly. However, Stella Rose later reveals she wanted revenge after Bob ended their affair 20 years earlier and left her hurt, before announcing her return to pageant coaching. Noticing Patty has a crush on Bob, Stella Rose hands her an engraved necklace that Bob gave to her as proof of the affair.
4	4	"WMBS"	Maggie Kiley	Danielle Hoover & David Monahan	August 10, 2018
Patty schemes to break up Bob Armstrong and Coralee using Stella Rose's necklace. After Etta Mae is dismissed from the Junior League, Coralee makes an effort to impress her by creating an organization for working mothers. Angie returns from her AA retreat. When the pageant Patty was going to enter in order to qualify for Miss Magic Jesus is canceled, Bob Armstrong makes plans for Patty and Coralee to compete together in a local mother–daughter pageant. Though neither one of them is initially happy about working together, Patty and Coralee eventually find common ground. Bob Armstrong and Coralee discover Brick's affair with Regina Sinclair, who is later arrested for statutory rape. Angie convinces Nonnie to compete in the mother–daughter pageant with her in an effort to make Patty jealous. Patty and Coralee win the pageant, but Coralee ditches Patty in order to be accepted into an exclusive group of upper-class women. Hurt and angry, Patty gives Stella Rose's necklace to Coralee.
5	5	"Bikinis and Bitches"	Andrew Fleming	Lauren Gussis & Andrew Green	August 10, 2018
Patty is disqualified from Miss Magic Jesus after nude pictures of Dixie are leaked from her phone. Patty, Nonnie, and Choi try to figure out who might have hacked Patty's phone. Coralee leaves Bob Armstrong after receiving Stella Rose's necklace from Patty. Magnolia breaks up with Brick when she learns of his affair with Regina. Patty and Brick grow closer as he confides in her about his strained relationship with his father. Bob Armstrong is determined to win Coralee back, while attempting to mend his relationship with Brick. Magnolia offers to help Patty get back into Miss Magic Jesus by organizing a fundraiser. Christian becomes Bob Armstrong's newest legal client after being caught with drugs, but Christian's mother asks Bob to throw the case so that Christian faces consequences. When Dixie sabotages the fundraiser, Brick saves the day. Bob Armstrong discovers that Regina's cellmate hacked Patty's phone. Patty and Brick kiss.
6	6	"Dunk 'N' Donut"	Brian Dannelly	Kari Drake & Jace Richdale	August 10, 2018
Patty's plans for Miss Magic Jesus suffer a setback when she discovers that she was never baptized. After learning that Patty lied about her relationship with Brick, Magnolia vows to make Patty's life hell. In order to baptize Patty properly, Pastor Mike Keene tasks Patty and Bob Armstrong with completing good deeds, but the two struggle to make amends with the ones they have hurt. Following a heart-to-heart with Choi, Nonnie slowly comes to terms with her sexuality as she meets Dee, a plus-size pageant contestant. Nonnie confesses her feelings for Patty but becomes upset with Patty's indifference and accuses her of being self-involved. After accidentally ruining Brick's wrestling match, Bob Armstrong decides to get baptized alongside Patty. Magnolia attempts to sabotage Patty's baptism by spiking her drink, which causes Patty to hallucinate during the ceremony and prompts her to choose Christian over Brick.
7	7	"Miss Magic Jesus"	Lev L. Spiro	Danielle Hoover & David Monahan	August 10, 2018
Bob Barnard's attempt to blackmail Bob Armstrong with a sex tape of Patty and Christian backfires. Patty and Bob Armstrong are worried when Stella Rose is announced as a last-minute judge for Miss Magic Jesus. After discovering that Roxy is Stella Rose's daughter, Bob Armstrong wonders if he is Roxy's biological father, while inadvertently neglecting Patty. Christian offers to help Patty with the newly introduced Bible trivia quiz segment of the pageant by stealing the answers. Magnolia wins Miss Magic Jesus, while Patty is named first runner-up. With his parents determined to send him to military school due to his antics, Christian convinces Patty to run away with him to Hollywood. When Bob Armstrong discovers that Bob Barnard is Roxy's father, Barnard reveals that Stella Rose slept with him in order to take revenge on Armstrong. In exchange for Armstrong's silence, Barnard discloses that Magnolia cheated on the Bible quiz, allowing Patty to win the crown. After overhearing the conversation between the Bobs, Magnolia overdoses.
8	8	"Wieners and Losers"	Andrew Fleming	Lauren Gussis & Jenina Kibuka	August 10, 2018
Patty loses her virginity to Christian, but she later realizes he does not love her back. Following Magnolia's disqualification, Patty claims the Miss Magic Jesus crown, and with Bob Armstrong's help, she strikes a deal with Wiener Taco to sponsor her for regionals. When Bob Armstrong's father suffers a heart attack, the two reconcile, while Bob and Coralee begin to rekindle their relationship. However, things turn sour when Bob Armstrong learns that Coralee had an affair and his father hired Bob Barnard as a senior partner at the firm. Patty panics when her pregnancy test comes back positive, but it turns out to be a teratoma, a tumor that was once her twin in utero. Pastor Mike fears that Patty's tumor could be a demon inside her. During the Wiener Taco grand reopening, the Bobs engage in a physical fight that ends in a heated makeout session and a surprising love declaration on Bob Barnard's end. Dixie attacks Patty in an attempt to steal her crown. In response, Patty throws Dixie off Wiener Taco's new food truck and renders her unconscious.
9	9	"Bad Kitty"	Steven Tsuchida	Jace Richdale	August 10, 2018
At school, Patty's fight with Dixie goes viral. Following Bob Barnard's confession, Bob Armstrong goes to couples therapy with Coralee. Christian becomes obsessed with Patty's "demon", helping her figure out a way to control it and use it to her advantage. Paralyzed and in a wheelchair, Dixie returns to school, where an anti-bullying assembly is held so that Patty and Dixie can apologize to each other. Convinced that Dixie is faking her injury, Patty pushes her out of her wheelchair in front of the entire school, only to discover that Dixie was not lying. Patty eventually agrees to undergo an exorcism at Pastor Mike's suggestion. However, when both Pastor Mike and the exorcist he enlisted are unable to make it to the school, Bob Armstrong steps in to conduct the exorcism, with assistance from Nonnie and Choi. The exorcist finally arrives and declares Patty was never possessed by a demon. Bob Armstrong accepts his feelings for Bob Barnard and goes over to his house.
10	10	"Banana Heart Banana"	Elodie Keene	Tim Schlattmann	August 10, 2018
After spending the night at Bob Barnard's house, Bob Armstrong struggles to lead a double life. Patty is suspended from school for pushing Dixie out of her wheelchair. In order to make amends, Bob Armstrong suggests throwing a charity roast for Patty's 18th birthday to raise money to buy Dixie a new electric wheelchair; Patty reluctantly agrees. Bob Armstrong discovers that Christian was once arrested for trying to kidnap his girlfriend in Brazil. When Patty confronts Christian, he becomes physically violent and Brick comes to her rescue. During the party, Angie tells Patty she needs to leave town for a while, and Nonnie declares she needs a break from their friendship. To make matters worse, Patty walks in on the Bobs making out. Humiliated, Patty exposes their affair to the entire party, including Coralee and Brick, causing Bob Armstrong to walk out on Patty. Feeling sad and abandoned, Patty goes home and binges on a sheet cake.
11	11	"Winners Win. Period."	Lev L. Spiro	Lauren Gussis & Michael Ellis	August 10, 2018
Patty deals with the aftermath of her birthday party by isolating herself and binge eating for a week, until a visit by Drew Barrymore to Atlanta inspires her to make amends. Patty invites Nonnie to Barrymore's book signing, but Nonnie is not ready to end their break. Brick helps Patty lose weight in time for regionals, while protecting her from Christian, who has been stalking her. Bob Barnard and Magnolia reach out to Roxy to reveal he is her father. Though Roxy initially lashes out at Bob Barnard for abandoning her, she eventually changes her mind after confronting Stella Rose, and the Bobs decide to coach her for regionals together. Patty apologizes to Bob Armstrong for outing him, but he is still angry at her, revealing he will now coach Roxy. The Bobs and Coralee talk things out, before engaging in a threesome. After tasering Roxy in an effort to sabotage her, Patty is hit with a tranquilizer dart and falls unconscious.
12	12	"Why Bad Things Happen"	Andrew Fleming	Lauren Gussis & Jace Richdale	August 10, 2018
Patty awakens after being kidnapped by Stella Rose and Roxy, who are plotting to take down Bob Armstrong. However, when her revenge plans go awry because Bob has realized he is no longer interested in pageants, a deranged Stella Rose plans to kill Patty and make it look like she committed suicide over Bob. Patty manages to escape in time to register for regionals. Bob Armstrong talks Coralee into being in a thruple with Bob Barnard, but Barnard is not on board, forcing Armstrong to choose between the two. Patty goes to meet with Magnolia after receiving a text message from her, only to discover it was sent by Christian, who, in an effort to win Patty back, roofied Magnolia after learning she had re-qualified for regionals. After Patty frees Magnolia, Christian reminds Patty of all the bad things she has done, prompting her to beat him to death with a crowbar. Patty calls Bob Armstrong—who was contemplating suicide—for help, and they push Christian's car into a lake in order to hide the evidence, but it fails to sink. Patty confesses to Bob that she thinks she also killed Stella Rose.

=== Season 2 (2019) ===
No. overall	No. in season	Title	Directed by	Written by	Original release date
13	1	"Pig"	Andrew Fleming	Lauren Gussis	October 11, 2019
Patty tells Bob Armstrong that she was handcuffed into the food truck by Stella Rose, who wanted to kill her and frame it as a suicide to make Bob feel guilty. While escaping, Patty accidentally ran Stella over twice with the food truck. Bob asks Patty not to call the police. When she accompanies him to the place where she killed Stella, they do not find her body and realize that Stella may still be alive and out there somewhere. They decide to get rid of Christian's corpse before dealing with Stella Rose. In the forest, the trunk of Bob's car containing Christian opens and the corpse falls to the ground. Pigs arrive and eat the whole body. Meanwhile, Coralee makes advances towards Bob Barnard, but he refuses because he is gay. Later, he overhears Roxy on the phone and discovers that she is using him to help Stella Rose take revenge on Bob Armstrong. He then realises Magnolia is missing. In the regional pageant, Roxy discovers that Patty has escaped the food truck. During the rehearsal, Bob returns to Roxy's dressing room and spies on her phone. He discovers that she does not know where Stella Rose is. Roxy is crowned the winner of Regionals, with Patty in second place. Patty runs to throw up in the bathroom after previously binging on pastries which she covered in soap to prove to Bob she did not have an eating disorder. Magnolia reappears, and suddenly a scream is heard. Roxy is found dead in her dressing room, strangled by her own sash.
14	2	"Dead Girl"	Brian Dannelly	Rick Cleveland	October 11, 2019
The police interview everyone at the pageant. Magnolia claims she does not remember where she was after the fight with her father, and is escorted to the hospital by her father. Patty is about to be interviewed when the officer who walks in is the same man Bob had a tryst with in the steam room. Patty admits she was throwing up in the bathroom but denies she has an eating disorder. Bob deduces that Patty could not have killed Roxy as she did not eat the pastries in Roxy's room afterwards. At the hospital, Magnolia is diagnosed with short-term memory loss. Bob brings Christian's car to a junkyard to have it crushed. Regina is selling her version of the tampazzle in the prisons. Since Roxy is dead, the pageant board has decided not to award anyone the crown. Bob claims the board is afraid to award the next crown because he claims they are afraid of what the public will say. Patty and Bob suggest a planned memorial to show all the pageant girls are successful and to prove Patty did not kill Roxy. Coralee gets news footage of a drunken Magnolia being drunk and foolish behind the news reporter, proving she could not have killed Roxy due to the timing. At the memorial, the pageant girls sing a song for Roxy. The pageant board decides to crown Patty. Dixie returns, but is run down by the wiener mobile.
15	3	"Boomerang"	Damian Marcano	Scott King	October 11, 2019
Dixie becomes paralyzed after getting hit by the ween mobile and hires Bob Armstrong as her lawyer. Coralee reaches out to Regina and they become partners for Tampazzle. Patty meets her father Gordy and they bond. Choi's lawyer initially wins the case over Bob and Dixie, however Bob finds out Choi had not gotten new glasses despite his eyesight worsening, leading to Dixie winning the case and becoming owner of the Wiener Taco. Patty finds out that Gordy sexually abused her mother when she was underage. Realizing he is to blame for their problems, she shoves him in rage, accidentally making him fall to his death. Panicked, she steals his phone and texts everyone a fake suicide note to cover it up.
16	4	"Poison Patty"	Andrew Fleming	Lauren Gussis & Andrew Fleming	October 11, 2019
Traumatized after accidentally murdering her father, Patty begins to have hallucinations of him calling her a bad seed. Coralee hands Bob divorce papers, much to his dismay. Brick helps his father get back into dating, which leads him to a swinger event. Coralee and Regina hold a period-themed Tampazzle launch party at the Wiener Taco with Bob Barnard to endorse him for mayor. Angie returns after having breast enlargement and reveals to Patty that she stayed gone out of fear of Gordy. Bob Armstrong fails to find a fitting couple at the swinger event and confronts Coralee and Barnard at the party, announcing that he is running for mayor as well, with Angie as his campaign manager. A paternity test reveals that Gordy is not actually Patty's father.
17	5	"Finding Magnolia"	Brian Dannelly	Jessica Watson	October 11, 2019
Nonnie launches an investigation to find out what happened to Magnolia the night she was blacked out. Patty, afraid Magnolia will remember that she killed Christian, goes along to attempt to sabotage. Brick mistakes Patty's anxiety for disinterest in him and, after taking advice from Magnolia, practices kissing on fruits. Dixie gets a visit from her birth family, who tell her that Regina is not actually her adoptive mother, but her kidnapper. Angie tries to help Bob Armstrong improve his image by having him give out free hot dogs, however the event takes a turn for the worse when it's revealed his father is backing Bob Barnard for mayor. Armstrong confronts his father who claims he does it to protect him as he is "too fragile", and reveals that his mother did not die of cancer, but rather committed suicide. Armstrong hands his gun to Angie to make sure he does not make the same mistake. Magnolia manages to find out what happened to her after Patty killed Christian, but does not remember what happened before. Patty covers it up by texting her from Christian's phone and lying about what happened. Armstrong issues a public apology which is poorly received. Patty walks in on Brick and Magnolia kissing.
18	6	"Eat and Run"	Ryan Shiraki	Lisa Parsons	October 11, 2019
19	7	"Full Brazilian"	Nancy Hower	Gil Hizon	October 11, 2019
20	8	"Pretty in Prison"	Suzi Yoonessi	Michael Ellis	October 11, 2019
21	9	"Ladybomb"	Brian Dannelly	Roxy Röckenwagner	October 11, 2019
22	10	"The Most You You Can Be"	Andrew Fleming	Lauren Gussis & Rick Cleveland	October 11, 2019

== Production ==
A pilot for the series was ordered by The CW, but passed on before Netflix picked up the series. The series was filmed in Newnan, Georgia and Atlanta, Georgia . Season 2 was filmed from early-March 2019 to late-June 2019. Season 2 only consisted of 10 episodes, compared to 12 episodes in the first season. On February 14, 2020, the series was cancelled after two seasons.

== Release ==
On July 19, 2018, the trailer for the series was released. The first season of Insatiable premiered on Netflix on August 10, 2018.

On July 10, 2018, Netflix released the first teaser and the first images from the series.

Prior to the show's release, The Guardian reported on July 24, 2018, that over 100,000 people had signed an online petition on Change.org started on July 20, 2018, calling for Netflix to cancel Insatiable, accusing it of "fat shaming". Lauren Gussis, the show's creator, defended the show, saying it was based on her own experiences as a teenager. Alyssa Milano stated on Twitter, "We are not shaming Patty .. We are addressing (through comedy) the damage that occurs from fat-shaming." As of August 27, 2018, the petition had over 230,000 signatures.

== Reception ==
The series has an approval rating of 11% based on 56 reviews from critics, with an average rating of 2.68/10 on Rotten Tomatoes. The site's critic consensus reads: "Broad stereotypes, clumsy social commentary, and a failed attempt at wokeness make Insatiable hard to swallow." Metacritic reported a score of 25 out of 100 for the series, based on reviews from 15 critics, indicating "generally unfavorable" reviews.

In negative reviews, Tim Goodman of The Hollywood Reporter called the series "trite", "unfunny", and "a hot bloated mess", while Jen Chaney from Vulture called it "an equal opportunity trainwreck" replete with bad jokes about rape and pedophilia, and offensive stereotypes of African Americans, Christians, Southerners and gay people.

Reviewer Linda Holmes of NPR said the show willfully misunderstood the realities of fat-shaming and the concerns of fat people like herself; arguing that being fat should be respected and treated with kindness: "Let me assure you: It is not satire. Insatiable is satire in the same way someone who screams profanities out a car window is a spoken-word poet."

Writer Roxane Gay called the show "lazy" and "insulting" in a Refinery29 piece, saying "Insatiable's greatest sin is that it suffers from a profound lack of imagination. The show cannot imagine that a straight man could truly love pageants and mentoring young women and be secure in his masculinity, or that a young lesbian could love herself enough to not fall in love with her straight best friend, or that a fat girl could be happy, healthy, and thriving without losing weight. Never does this show dare to imagine that maybe it was everyone else who had the problem when Patty was fat, not Patty herself. The show cannot imagine that perhaps, the most profound way Patty could seek vengeance would be to love herself at any size, to be seen by a love interest as lovable at any size, to see herself as beautiful because of, rather than despite, her fat body."

In an interview with Variety, star Debby Ryan stated that she listened to the body-positive podcast "She's All Fat" in preparation for the role. Responding via their Twitter account, hosts of the podcast Sophia Carter-Kahn and April K. Quioh stated: "We're not sure how our show could inspire a thin actress to don a fat suit as we've discussed at length how this very act is incredibly harmful to the fat community."
