= Jack Gore (actor) =

American actor

- Born: 2004 or 2005 (age 21–22); New York City, U.S.
- Occupation: Actor
- Years active: 2013–present

Jack Gore (born 2004 or 2005) is an American actor. He is known for his role as Timmy Cleary in the ABC sitcom The Kids Are Alright (2018–2019). He also starred as Graham Henry in the NBC sitcom The Michael J. Fox Show (2013–2014) and had a recurring role as Gordie Axelrod in the Showtime series Billions (2016–2023). His film credits include Wonder Wheel, Ferdinand (both 2017), Ideal Home (2018), Rim of the World (2019), and The SpongeBob Movie: Sponge on the Run (2020).

== Life and career ==
Gore is from Inwood, Manhattan. He made his film debut in We Are What We Are, in 2013. He also starred in The Michael J. Fox Show (2013) as Mike's and Annie's younger son.

In 2016, Gore, along with his sibling, Mars, launched a detective agency called Gore & Gore Detective Agency. Later, he appeared in Wonder Wheel, where he played Richie.

Gore also starred in several TV series such as Billions (2016) and The Kids Are Alright (2018), where he plays Timmy Cleary, the protagonist of the show, based on showrunner and creator Tim Doyle's own upbringing in a traditional Irish-Catholic family in the 1970s.

== Filmography ==
=== Film ===
Year	Title	Role	Notes
2013	We Are What We Are	Rory Parker	
2014	More Time With Family	Mack Rizzo	TV movie
2014	Every Secret Thing	Tommy	Uncredited
2015	Problem Child	Bishop Martin	TV movie
2017	Wonder Wheel	Richie	
2017	Ferdinand	Young Valiente	Voice
2018	Ideal Home	Angel/Bill Brumble	
2019	Rim of the World	Alex	
2020	The SpongeBob Movie: Sponge on the Run	Young Patrick Star	Voice
2021	Things Heard and Seen	Cole Vayle	
TBA	Who Framed Tommy Callahan	Johnny Callahan	Post-production

=== Television ===
Year	Title	Role	Notes
2013–2014	The Michael J. Fox Show	Graham Henry	22 episodes
2015–2016	Billy & Billie	Carson	4 episodes
2016	Law & Order: Special Victims Unit	Luca Crivello	1 episode; "Townhouse Incident"
2016	Horace and Pete	Young Horace	1 episode; S1 E10
2016–2023	Billions	Gordie Axelrod	19 episodes
2018–2019	The Kids Are Alright	Timmy Cleary	Main Character
2018	Philip K. Dick's Electric Dreams	Charlie Cotrell	1 episode; "The Father Thing"
2018	AfterBuzz TV Red Carpets, Junkets & Events	Self	1 episode
2019	Bull	Charlie Crawford	1 episode; "Safe and Sound"
2021	Just Beyond	Mason	1 episode; The Treehouse
2022	Our Time	Collin	TV movie
2025	The Four Seasons	Kayden	1 episode; "Fun"
