= Mardi Gras Film Festival =

LGBTQ film festival in Sydney, Australia

Mardi Gras Film Festival Queer Screen Film Fest
- Status: Active
- Genre: LGBTQ+ film festival
- Begins: 2 September 2026 (QSFF)
- Ends: 8 September 2026
- Frequency: Annually
- Locations: Sydney, New South Wales
- Country: Australia
- Inaugurated: February 1994 (MGFF); September 2013 (QSFF)
- Founder: Queer Screen (1993)
- CEO: Benson Wu
- Organiser: Queer Screen Limited
- Website: queerscreen.org.au

The Mardi Gras Film Festival, formerly known as the Gay and Lesbian Film Festival, is an Australian LGBTQ+ film festival held in Sydney, New South Wales annually each February as part of the Sydney Gay and Lesbian Mardi Gras celebrations. It is organised by Queer Screen Limited, which also organises the Queer Screen Film Fest (QSFF), held each September in Sydney.

== History ==
Australia had the world's first gay film festival, entitled A Festival of Gay Films at the Sydney Filmmakers Co-op in June 1976, part of a larger commemoration of the Stonewall Riots in New York City of 1969.

Inaugurated in 1978 as the Gay and Lesbian Film Festival by the Australian Film Institute, the film festival joined the Mardi Gras in 1986 to present an annual "Sydney Gay Film Week" in conjunction with the parade. Queer Screen took control of the festival in 1993, and held the first festival in 1994.

For ten years, Queer Screen ran a separate documentary festival, queerDOC, which became was the first and only LGBTQI documentary film festival in the world. It also ran a short film competition for locally produced work, called My Queer Career. Both of these were merged into the Mardi Gras Film Festival.

In 2013 Queer Screen founded a new film festival, the Queer Screen Film Fest, which is now a major annual event taking place on screens in Sydney each September. In 2014, St George's Bank committed to funding Queer Screen for two years.

In 2023 Queer Screen became the first LGBTIQ+ film festival in the world to participate in the "Goes to Cannes" program at the Marché du Film at the Cannes Film Festival.

== Description ==
In addition to the Mardi Gras Film Festival, Queer Screen organises the Queer Screen Film Fest, awards funding to Australian filmmakers through its Queer Screen Completion Fund, and since 2018 has funded the Queer Screen Pitch Off, a short film pitching competition.

As of September 2026 Benson Wu is CEO of Queer Screen, while Jessica Liley and Mike Whalley are co-chairs of the board. Queer Screen Limited is a non-profit organisation, and one of the world's largest platforms for queer cinema.

=== Queer Screen Film Festival ===
In 2026, the 13th edition of Queer Screen Film Festival (QSFF26) is taking place from 2 to 8 September, in which 28 films are screened. Afterwards, a curated on-demand season is held. The festival also includes the Queer Screen Pitch Off Competition and Emerging Narrative Feature Competition, as well as the inaugural Queer Screen Studio, comprising masterclasses and panels.

== Featured films ==
Below is a list of some of the films featured in each festival edition.

- 1994: And the Band Played On, The East Is Red, Naked Killer
- 1995: Strawberry and Chocolate, Libera, Coming Out Under Fire
- 1996: Jeffrey, The Incredibly True Adventure of Two Girls in Love, Catwalk
- 1997: An Actor's Revenge, BloodSisters, Bound
- 1998: It's in the Water, Leather Jacket Love Story, Bent
- 1999: Relax...It's Just Sex, Billy's Hollywood Screen Kiss, Blind Faith
- 2000: Trick, But I'm a Cheerleader, Edge of Seventeen
- 2001: If These Walls Could Talk 2, Chutney Popcorn, The Boys in the Band
- 2002: The Fluffer, By Hook or by Crook, Urbania
- 2003: The Trip, Swimming Upstream, Under One Roof
- 2004: Camp, Goldfish Memory, Mango Kiss
- 2005: The Raspberry Reich, The Aggressives, Butterfly
- 2006: Transamerica, Loggerheads, Kinky Boots
- 2007: Coming Out, Loving Annabelle, The Gymnast
- 2008: The World Unseen, The 2 Sides of the Bed, Bam Bam and Celeste
- 2009: Were the World Mine, Drifting Flowers, I Can't Think Straight
- 2010: An Englishman in New York, And Then Came Lola, Prayers for Bobby
- 2011: Kaboom, I Love You Phillip Morris, Elena Undone
- 2012: Dirty Girl, Romeos, Weekend
- 2013: A Liar's Autobiography: The Untrue Story of Monty Python's Graham Chapman, Call Me Kuchu, Head On
- 2014: Reaching for the Moon, Any Day Now, C.O.G.
- 2015: Brokeback Mountain, The Way He Looks, Stories of Our Lives
- 2016: Starting From ... Now!, Out to Win, How to Win at Checkers (Every Time)
- 2017: Handsome Devil, A Date for Mad Mary, Angry Indian Goddesses
- 2018: Ideal Home, Love, Simon, BPM (Beats per Minute)
- 2019: Giant Little Ones, Rafiki, Un Rubio
- 2020: Ellie & Abbie (& Ellie's Dead Aunt), An Almost Ordinary Summer, And Then We Danced
- 2021: Dating Amber, Rūrangi, Supernova
- 2022: Wildhood, B-Boy Blues, Firebird
- 2023: Of an Age, Tár, Lonesome
- 2024: Femme, All of Us Strangers, Housekeeping for Beginners
- 2025: Young Hearts, Carnage for Christmas, Duino

== See also ==
- Sydney Gay and Lesbian Mardi Gras
