= Ronnie Larsen =

American playwright and film director

- Occupations: Playwright, film director
- Years active: 1990s–present
- Known for: Plays and films focusing on sexuality; Making Porn; Shooting Porn
- Notable work: Making Porn, Shooting Porn, 10 Naked Men

Ronnie Larsen is a playwright and film director, specializing in writing plays about sex.

His play Making Porn was about the gay porn industry in the 1980s, and the production was notable for casting gay porn actors. Productions have starred Blue Blake, Rex Chandler, and Ryan Idol.

In 1997, Larsen made a documentary about the gay porn industry entitled Shooting Porn. It is not a filmed version of the play Making Porn. The film featured figures from the gay pornography industry including Gino Colbert, Chi Chi LaRue, Blue Blake, Adam Rom, Rip Stone and Adam Wilde.

== Plays produced ==
- 1994 Scenes From My Love Life
- 1995 Making Porn
- 1996 Talk Show later to be titled Sleeping with Straight Men
- 1998 Peep Show
- 2002 10 Naked Men

== Reviews ==
New York Times critic Stephen Holden found the film Shooting Porn to be "disappointingly frivolous," characterizing it as "coyly unrevealing" and a "shallow, titillating look" at its subject.
