= Threesome (1994 film) =

1994 film by Andrew Fleming

- Theatrical release poster
- Directed by: Andrew Fleming
- Written by: Andrew Fleming
- Produced by: Brad Krevoy
- Starring: Lara Flynn Boyle; Josh Charles; Stephen Baldwin
- Cinematography: Alexander Gruszynski
- Edited by: William C. Carruth
- Music by: Thomas Newman
- Production company: Motion Picture Corporation of America
- Distributed by: TriStar Pictures
- Release date: April 8, 1994
- Running time: 93 minutes
- Country: United States
- Language: English
- Budget: $3 million
- Box office: $14,815,317

Threesome is a 1994 American erotic dramedy film, written and directed by Andrew Fleming and starring Lara Flynn Boyle, Stephen Baldwin and Josh Charles. It is an autobiographical comedy mixed with social commentary, and is based on Fleming's college memories. The film was given an R rating by the Motion Picture Association of America.

== Plot ==
Due to an administrative error, two male college students — the shy and intellectual Eddy, and the All-American jock Stuart — end up with a female roommate. The university thought that Alex was a man (based on her name), and thus, the three students are forced to live with each other until the university can move Alex to a female residence hall.

Alex falls in love and tries unsuccessfully to seduce Eddy (who is gay); Eddy falls in love with Stuart; Stuart is in love with Alex. The trio become good friends and scare off anyone who tries to seduce the other. Eventually, Alex, Stuart and Eddy agree to have an actual threesome that seems to destroy the friendship, and raises the possibility that Alex might have become pregnant.

After the threesome, they start to drift apart. Three weeks later, the semester ends; Alex moves to an apartment and Eddy gets a single dorm. Eddy (the film's narrator) eventually finds a boyfriend, Stuart finds happiness in a monogamous relationship with a woman, and Alex remains single. While they now only see each other for lunch occasionally, they do not seem to regret the friendship they had while in college.

== Cast ==
- Josh Charles as Eddy
- Lara Flynn Boyle as Alex
- Stephen Baldwin as Stuart
- Alexis Arquette as Dick
- Martha Gehman as Renay
- Mark Arnold as Larry
- Michele Matheson as Kristen
- Joanne Baron as Curt Woman

== Reception ==
Upon release, the film received negative reviews but some critics praised the ensemble cast and themes. The review aggregator Rotten Tomatoes reported that 29% of critics gave Threesome positive reviews, based on 28 reviews, with an average rating of 4.5/10. The site's consensus reads, "Threesome's titillating title belies a dreadfully dull drama whose attractive stars are handily outmatched by a shallow script". Peter Travers' review for Rolling Stone magazine reads, "We're supposed to get all teary when kinkiness threatens to break up a friendship that was hard to swallow in the first place. There's lots of glossy cinematography, courtesy of Alexander Gruszynski, as the three lovers wander the campus separately, looking contemplative. Now there's a laugh. Eddy, a film student, actually makes reference to François Truffaut's ménage à trois classic, Jules and Jim. Eddy, you wish." Roger Ebert gave the film three stars and wrote "The dialogue is really the film's strongest element. The three actors are all smart, and able to reflect the way kids sometimes use words, even very bold words, as a mask for uncertainty and shyness."

=== Year-end lists ===
- 5th worst – John Hurley, Staten Island Advance
- 6th worst – Desson Howe, The Washington Post
- 6th worst – Dan Craft, The Pantagraph
- Top 10 worst (alphabetical order, not ranked) – William Arnold, Seattle Post-Intelligencer

== Home media ==
In 2001, a DVD of the film was released with some special features: a director's audio commentary, an alternate ending, various language subtitles and cast talent files.
