= Jack Binder =

American film producer

- Born: United States
- Occupations: Film and television producer, second unit director
- Relatives: Mike Binder (brother)

Jack Binder is an American film producer of such films as The Upside of Anger, First Reformed, Reign Over Me and television producer for The Mind of the Married Man, HBO, The Comedy Store, Showtime, and second unit director active since 1985. Binder works with the major Hollywood studios and independent film companies. Based in Los Angeles and London, Binder produces worldwide and is involved in film finance. He formed Michigan Film Production to provide information on the Michigan Film Incentives program, which he helped create with the legislature and Governor and created FilmBudget.com, a site that creates a feature film budget & film finance plans for financing and movie production. Binder's production company is Greentrees Films. Jack has worked with his brother Mike Binder, a writer, actor and director for over 25 years, collaborating on many productions together.

== Filmography ==
- Eating Our Way To Extinction (2021) financier, investor, associate producer Narrated by Kate Winslet. With Sir Richard Branson, Tony Robbins
- The Comedy Store (2020) line producer
- First Reformed (2018) producer
- Tomorrow (2016) executive producer (w/ Martin Scorsese)
- The Domino Effect (2012) producer
- Reign Over Me (2007) producer
- Man About Town (2007) producer, second unit director, unit production manager
- The Upside of Anger (2005) producer, unit production manager, second unit director
- The Mind of the Married Man (HBO series 2001–2002) producer, second unit director, unit production manager
- The Search for John Gissing (2002) producer, unit production manager, second unit director
- Fourplay (2001) producer, second unit director, unit production manager
- The Sex Monster (2000) producer, unit production manager, second unit director
- Blankman (1994) co-producer, second unit director
- Indian Summer (1993) co-producer
- Crossing the Bridge (1992) co-producer
- The Detroit Comedy Jam (1985) producer (HBO)
