= Amy Ferguson =

American actress and model

- Born: Cincinnati, Ohio, U.S.
- Occupations: Actress, model, singer-songwriter

Amy Ferguson is an American actress and model. Ferguson is also a singer-songwriter.

== Life and career ==
Ferguson was born in Cincinnati and raised in southern Ohio. She attended Dr. John Hole Elementary School in Washington Township and graduated in 2000 from Alter High School in Kettering, Ohio. She opted to move to New York City rather than attend college, and signed with the Ford Modeling Agency. She worked as a model in Italy, France, Japan, and South Africa, and appeared in television commercials for AT&T and Intel. Her first role was as a model in an episode of As The World Turns at age 19.

Ferguson began focusing on acting and broke into film in 2004 with independent feature Garden State. She played Dana, a young woman who kisses star and director Zach Braff's character in a party scene. The part led to other film and television opportunities, including an audition for the film Must Love Dogs starring Diane Lane. Ferguson appeared in the 2007 films Weapons, with Nick Cannon, and An American Crime, starring Elliot Page and Catherine Keener.

In 2009, Ferguson starred in Tanner Hall alongside Rooney Mara, Georgia King, and Brie Larson. The coming-of-age film, set in an all-girls boarding school in New England, was directed by Tatiana von Fürstenberg and Francesca Gregorini. Ferguson had a supporting role in the independent comedy, Douchebag, directed by Drake Doremus, which premiered at the 2010 Sundance Film Festival. She had also appeared in the director's 2009 film, Spooner.

In 2012, Ferguson played a department store model in The Master, directed by Paul Thomas Anderson, and starring Philip Seymour Hoffman, Joaquin Phoenix and Amy Adams. Ferguson appeared in Cold Turkey, with Peter Bogdanovich, Cheryl Hines and Alicia Witt. Set in Pasadena, California, the film looked at turmoil amidst an upper-class family's Thanksgiving get-together. She guest starred as Lily Anne on season 2 of the CW series, Hart of Dixie.

In 2016, Ferguson was cast as the lead, Inanna, in Split, a film by Deborah Kampmeier.

Ferguson has also appeared in advertisements for American Eagle Outfitters.

== Filmography ==
List of acting performances in film and television
Year	Film	Role	Notes
2004	Garden State	Dana	
2004	Scrubs	Girl in Bar	TV series, episode: "My Last Chance"
2007	Weapons	Nikki	
2007	An American Crime	Sally	
2007	To the Altar	Young Beth	Short film
2007	Walk Hard: The Dewey Cox Story	Teenager	Uncredited
2008	Bittersweet	Sam	
2008	Bad Blood Days		Short film
2009	Spooner	Lily	
2009	Tanner Hall	Lucasta	
2010	Douchebag	Sarah	
2010	The Social Network	Stoned Girl	
2010	Footsteps	Marnie	
2011	10 Years + 10 Minutes	Felicity	
2012	The Master	Martha the Salesgirl	
2012–2013	Hart of Dixie	Lily Anne Lonergan	TV series, 4 episodes
2013	Cold Turkey	Missy	
2013	The Caretaker	The Creature	Short film
2013	Electric Slide	Sandy	
2014	Welcome to New York	Renee	
2016	Split	Inanna	Feature-length film
2016	Poor Boy	Cynthia Ravenblanket	
2017	'Til Death Do Us Part		Short film
