= Alicia Witt =

American actress (born 1975)

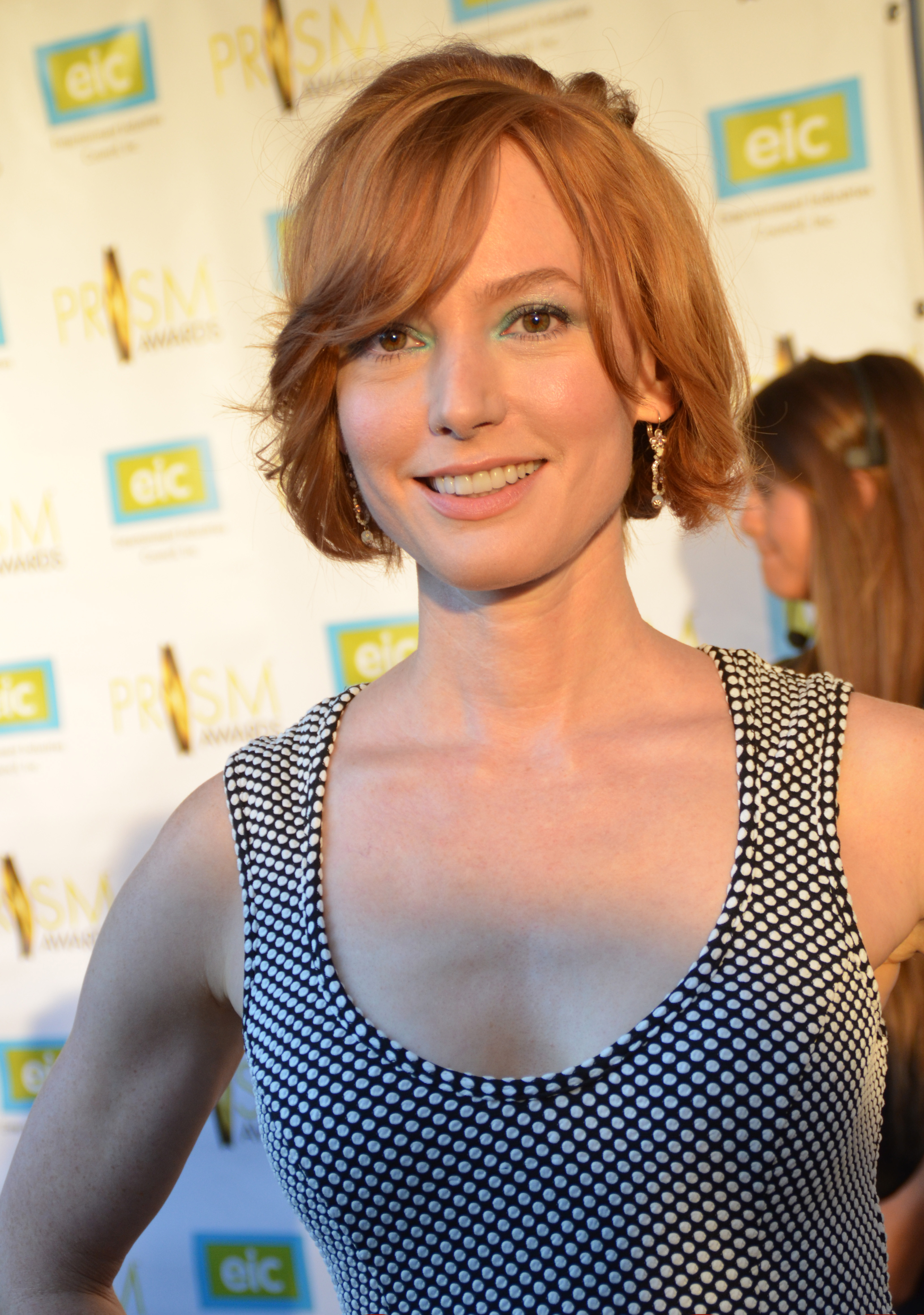
- Witt in 2014
- Born: Alicia Roanne Witt; August 21, 1975 (age 51); Worcester, Massachusetts, U.S.
- Occupations: Actress; musician
- Years active: 1984–present
- Musical career
- Genre: Alternative pop
- Instruments: Vocals; piano
- Website: aliciawittmusic.com

Alicia Roanne Witt (born August 21, 1975) is an American actress and musician. She first came to fame as a child actress after being discovered by David Lynch, who cast her in Dune (1984) as Alia and Twin Peaks (1990) as Gersten Hayward, a role she reprised in Twin Peaks: The Return (2017). Her 2026 album, Between Heaven and Earth, is a tribute to her relationship to Lynch and was described by the Times UK as ‘gorgeously sung… If this is what “directing from beyond” sounds like, it’s rather beautiful.” Witt was a regular on Cybill Shepherd's sitcom Cybill (1995–1998) for four seasons, playing the title character's daughter, Zoey Woodbine. She had a critically acclaimed role as a disturbed teenager in Fun (1994), appeared as a music student in Mr. Holland's Opus (1995) and as a terrorized college student in the horror film Urban Legend (1998). She appeared in Vanilla Sky (2001) as Libby, Two Weeks Notice (2002), Last Holiday (2006), 88 Minutes (2007) as Kim Cummings, I Care A Lot (2020) and Longlegs (2024). Witt has made television appearances in shows such as The Walking Dead, The Sopranos, Friday Night Lights as Cheryl, Twin Peaks: The Return as Gersten Hayward, CSI: Miami, Supernatural, Justified and Orange Is the New Black. She starred in five episodes of Law & Order: Criminal Intent as Detective Nola Falacci in Season 7, temporarily replacing actress Julianne Nicholson, who was on maternity leave.

In addition to her acting, Witt is an accomplished pianist, singer, and songwriter. Between 2013 and 2020 she starred in eight Hallmark Christmas films. Many of these include her original Christmas songs. In her Hallmark film Christmas Tree Lane (2020), she was also executive producer and storywriter, and contributed two original songs which her character sings on screen.

== Early life and education ==
Witt was born on August 21, 1975 in Worcester, Massachusetts, to Diane (née Pietro), a junior high school reading teacher, and Robert Witt, a science teacher and photographer. Talking by age two and reading by the age of four, she has been described as a child prodigy. Her acting talent was recognized by director David Lynch in 1983, when casting director Jane Jenkins watched her 1980 appearance reciting Shakespeare's Romeo and Juliet on the television show That's Incredible! at age five, and brought her to New York City to audition for the role of Alia in Dune. Lynch began working with her in film and television before Witt earned her high-school equivalency credential at age 14. From the ages of 10 to 14, she took four piano lessons a week, including from a Boston University professor, and competed nationally.

== Career ==
=== Film and television ===
Witt's discovery by Lynch led to her casting as the "flame-haired" child in Dune (1984), as Paul Atreides's sister Alia; she turned eight during filming. She worked with Lynch again when she appeared in an episode of Twin Peaks, playing the younger sister of Lara Flynn Boyle's character Donna.

Her acting background led to small parts in Mike Figgis' Liebestraum in 1991 (her brother Ian also appears), the Gen-X drama Bodies, Rest & Motion (1993), and the television film The Disappearance of Vonnie (1994). In 1994, Witt landed her first lead role in a film, playing a disturbed, murderous teenager in Fun and receiving the Special Jury Recognition Award at the Sundance Film Festival. Witt was then cast in Four Rooms as Madonna's lover in the episode "The Missing Ingredient".

Witt was introduced to a larger audience in the role of Cybill Shepherd's daughter, Zoey Woodbine, in the sitcom Cybill. While playing that part from 1995 to 1998, she also had film roles in Stephen Herek's Mr. Holland's Opus, Alexander Payne's Citizen Ruth, Robert Allan Ackerman's Passion's Way (based on the Edith Wharton novel, The Reef) and Richard Sears' comedy Bongwater. After Cybill was cancelled, Witt went on to leading roles in Jamie Blanks' horror film Urban Legend (1998) as Natalie, and in Kevin Altieri/Touchstone Pictures' limited-release animated feature Gen^{13}.

In 2000, Witt had guest starring roles on episodes of the television shows Ally McBeal and The Sopranos, the lead role in the Matthew Huffman comedy Playing Mona Lisa and a part in John Waters' Cecil B. Demented.

Next, she acted in a small part in Cameron Crowe's Vanilla Sky (2001). Witt played "Two", the college graduate discussing loss of her virginity, in Rodrigo García's Ten Tiny Love Stories and played the role of promiscuous Barbie, half-sister of the title character, in American Girl. Witt also appeared in Marc Lawrence's romantic comedy Two Weeks Notice (2002).

In 2003, she portrayed Joan Allen's daughter in the U.S.-based comic drama The Upside of Anger). Later that year, Witt went to South Africa to shoot a film interpretation of the epic poem "Das Nibelungenlied", played one of the central characters, Kriemhild, in the German television film Kingdom in Twilight. Kingdom in Twilight has the title Dark Kingdom: The Dragon King in the U.S. and The Ring of the Nibelungs and The Sword of Xanten elsewhere.

Witt filmed Last Holiday (2006) opposite Queen Latifah, and the thriller 88 Minutes (2007) opposite Al Pacino, and joined the cast of Law & Order: Criminal Intent for the 2007–2008 season. In the latter she played Detective Nola Falacci, a character temporarily replacing Megan Wheeler as Detective Mike Logan's partner (who was away on maternity leave) and was a recurring character in the 2007–2008 season. Witt appeared in the role of Amy in the film Peep World (2010).

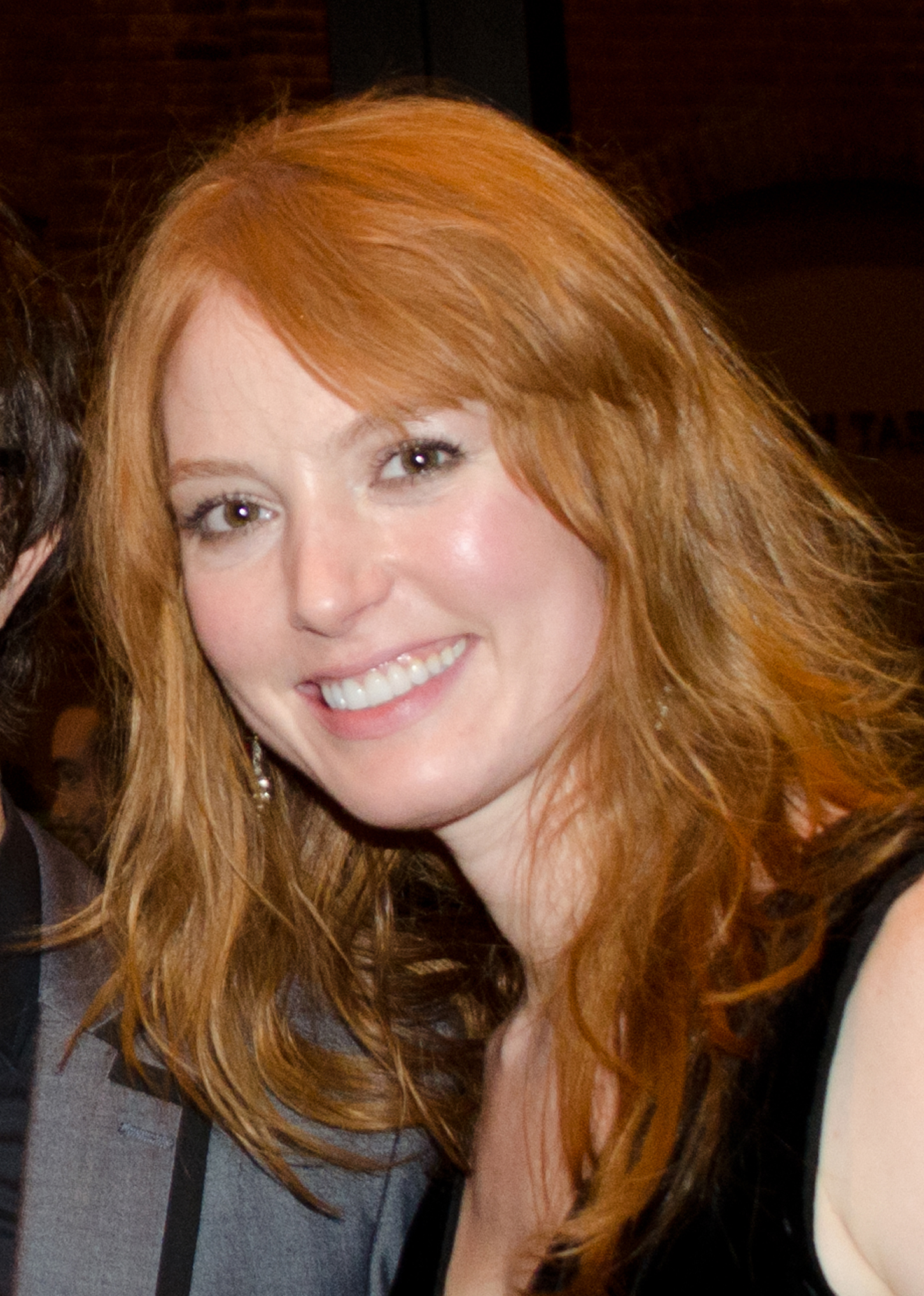
Witt in 2012

Witt appeared as the character Elaine Clayton in Cowgirls 'n Angels (2012), and in 2013, co-starred in the independent film Cold Turkey (opposite Peter Bogdanovich and Cheryl Hines); therein, she additionally performed an original musical piece over the end credits. Her dramatic performance in this film was critically acclaimed, with New York Magazine's David Edelstein proclaiming her turn one of the top performances of 2013. She appeared in four Christmas films in 2013: the feature film Tyler Perry's A Madea Christmas, A Snow Globe Christmas for the Lifetime Channel and A Very Merry Mix-Up as an antique store owner, Alice Chapman for the Hallmark Channel and in 2014, the Hallmark Channel's Christmas at Cartwright's. Also in 2014, Witt appeared in a guest-starring role on the DirecTV series, Kingdom, which aired that October.

In 2014, in the fifth season of the FX series Justified she played Wendy Crowe, the brightest member of a Floridian crime family that gets entangled in the show's events in Kentucky. In April 2016, Witt appeared in two episodes of The Walking Dead; the same month, it was announced that she would also be reprising her role as Gersten Hayward in the 2017 Twin Peaks series. Witt filmed a guest-starring role on season 12 of Supernatural as Lily Sunder, a former enemy of Castiel's. In 2016, Witt joined the cast of ABC's Nashville in a recurring capacity playing established country singer Autumn Chase. Witt performed several songs throughout season four. In 2019, she had a recurring role on the seventh season of Orange Is the New Black as Zelda. She also appeared opposite Rosamund Pike in the 2020 Netflix hit movie I Care A Lot.

In 2022, Witt appeared in the crime thriller Alice. In 2024, Witt starred in Oz Perkins's smash hit horror film Longlegs, opposite Maika Monroe and Nicolas Cage; the movie became the most successful independent film of 2024, earning over $128M at the box office alone. Witt has 3 movies filmed and to be released in 2026, including Shiver, and The Big Kill, opposite Skeet Ulrich, Pete Holmes, and Natasha Leggero, from Live Nation Studios and Emmy winning The Daily Show head writer Daniel Radosh, and indie fly fishing drama My Mayfly, from first time director Paula Kay Hornick.

=== Theater ===
Witt made her stage debut in 2001, at Los Angeles' historic Tiffany Theater, in Robbie Fox's musical The Gift, in which she played a high-priced, albeit disease-carrying, stripper.

While in residence in the UK in 2004, she starred as Evelyn in a stage production of Neil LaBute's The Shape of Things at the New Ambassadors Theatre. In September 2006, Witt returned to the London stage at the Royal Court Theatre, in the critically well-received Piano/Forte, wherein she was "well-cast" in portraying the stammering, emotionally damaged pianist Abigail, sister to "unloved attention-seeker" Louise (Kelly Reilly).

Witt performed alongside Amber Tamblyn in Neil LaBute's play, Reasons to Be Pretty, at the Geffen Playhouse, which ran until August 31, 2014.

=== Music ===
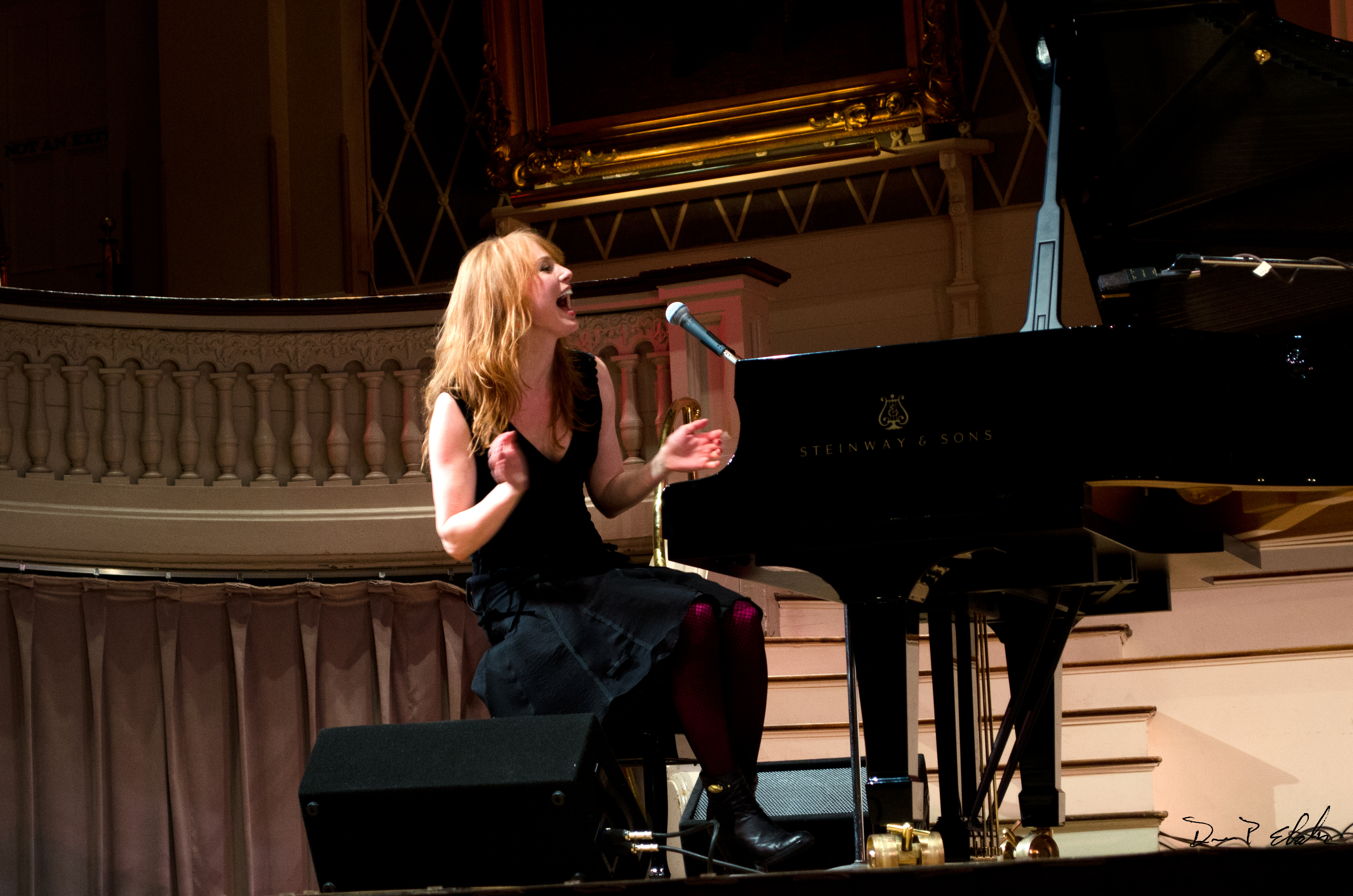
Witt performing in 2012

In addition to acting, Witt is a professional singer-songwriter and pianist, and is reported to have been a musical prodigy. She played piano at the restaurant at the Beverly Wilshire Hotel in the early/mid 1990s.

Responses to her 2006 stage portrayal of Abigail in Piano/Forte, which included scenes of piano-playing, noted her skill as an "outstanding pianist".

In 2009, Witt released her self-titled extended play album, followed by Live at Rockwood in 2012 and Revisionary History in 2015; the latter was produced by Ben Folds. In 2013, Witt and Folds performed a song they had co-written on the soundtrack for the independent film Cold Turkey. The Nashville Scene said of Revisionary History: "Witt's new album Revisionary History is a piano-pop gem that sounds by turns like 'Grey Seal'–era Elton John, an alt-universe Fiona Apple and a film-noir chanteuse notching her nights in cigarette burns on the fallboard."

In August 2018, Witt released a five-song EP album titled 15,000 Days (a reference to the length of time she had been alive when she recorded the album) working with producer Jacquire King. She released her album The Conduit on September 24, 2021, which she co-produced with Jordan Lehning and Bill Reynolds.

In 2020, Witt released two new Christmas songs, as heard in her Hallmark Christmas film, Christmas Tree Lane. "Why Christmas" and "Christmas Will Never End" are performed on-screen by her character, music-store owner and songwriter Meg.

Alicia’s full length studio album, The Conduit, was released in 2021; it marked her debut as album producer, alongside Jordan Lehning and Bill Reynolds (Band of Horses). Her single from the album, Chasing Shadows, spent 5 weeks on the Billboard Top 30 radio chart.

In August 2023, Witt released the six-song EP, Witness.

Witt’s self-produced full length Christmas album, I Think I’m Spending Christmas With You, was released in November 2024; it was engineered by David Kalmusky and recorded in Nashville, TN, where she resides.

In June 2026, it was announced that her fifth album, Between Heaven and Earth, will be released in August through Thirty Tigers and is produced by Joe Henry. The album is a tribute to her relationship to Lynch, who she has described as having "changed my life in every way a life could be changed".

=== Other appearances ===
In September 1990, Witt competed on Wheel of Fortune.

On June 14, 2004, Witt modeled what is believed to be the most expensive hat ever made, for Christie's auction house in London. The Chapeau d'Amour, designed by Louis Mariette, is valued at US$2.7 million and is encrusted in diamonds.

On October 5, 2021, Witt released a book called Small Changes: A Rules-Free Guide to Add More Plant-Based Foods, Peace & Power to Your Life. It was released through Harper Collins / Harper Horizon.

In 2023, Witt competed in season nine of The Masked Singer as "Dandelion". While having bested Dee Snider as "Doll" and Lou Diamond Phillips as "Mantis" (who was spared by Robin Thicke ringing the Ding Dong Keep It On Bell) on "WB Movie Night", she was eliminated in "Masked Singer in Space" alongside Melissa Joan Hart as "Lamp".

== Personal life ==
On December 20, 2021, Witt's parents were found dead in their Worcester, Massachusetts, home. The cause was revealed on February 24, 2022, as "probable cardiac dysrhythmia" due to the cold of their neglected and improperly heated home. In a Facebook post, Witt revealed that her parents were fiercely independent and refused help with home repairs.

Witt battled breast cancer in 2021, and has been cancer-free since 2022 after undergoing chemotherapy and a mastectomy. In light of her cancer diagnosis and treatment, Witt has quit drinking alcohol.

Witt practices Transcendental Meditation.

== Filmography ==
=== Film ===
Year	Title	Role	Notes	Ref.
1984	Dune	Alia Atreides	Credited as Alicia Roanne Witt	
1991	Liebestraum	Girl in Dream		
1993	Bodies, Rest & Motion	Elizabeth		
1994	Fun	Bonnie		
1995	Four Rooms	Kiva	Segment: "The Missing Ingredient"	
1995	Mr. Holland's Opus	Gertrude Lang		
1996	Citizen Ruth	Cheryl Stoney		
1997	Bongwater	Serena		
1998	Urban Legend	Natalie Simon		
1999	The Reef	Sophy Viner		
2000	Playing Mona Lisa	Claire Goldstein		
2000	Cecil B. Demented	Cherish		
2000	Gen^{13}	Caitlin Fairchild	Voice, direct-to-video	
2001	Vanilla Sky	Libby		
2001	Ten Tiny Love Stories	Two		
2002	American Girl	Barbie		
2002	Two Weeks Notice	June Carver		
2004	Girls' Lunch	Unknown	Short film	
2005	The Upside of Anger	Hadley Wolfmeyer		
2006	Last Holiday	Ms. Burns		
2007	88 Minutes	Kim Cummings		
2010	The Pond	Shelly	Short film	
2010	Peep World	Amy		
2011	The Flight of the Swan	Maria		
2011	Joint Body	Michelle Page		
2012	Cowgirls n' Angels	Elaine Clayton		
2012	Bending the Rules	Roslyn Wohl		
2012	I Do	Mya Edwards		
2013	Weiner Dog Nationals	Melanie		
2013	A Madea Christmas	Amber		
2014	Away From Here	Lily		
2016	Six LA Love Stories	Michelle		
2017	The Bronx Bull	Denise		
2018	Mississippi Requiem	Minnie		
2018	Spare Room	Ginny		
2020	I Care a Lot	Karen Amos		
2020	Modern Persuasion	Wren Cosgrove		
2021	Fuzzy Head	Mother		
2022	Alice	Rachel		
2024	Longlegs	Ruth Harker		
2026	Twisted	Rebecca Kezian		
2026	My Mayfly	Ranger Kay		
TBA	Shiver	TBA	Post-production	

=== Television ===
Year	Title	Role	Notes
1990	Twin Peaks	Gersten Hayward	Episode #2.1
1993	Hotel Room	Diane	Episode: "Blackout"
1994	The Disappearance of Vonnie	Janine	Television film
1995–1998	Cybill	Zoey Woodbine	Main role
2000	Ally McBeal	Hope Mercey	2 episodes
2000	The Sopranos	Amy Safir	Episode: "D-Girl"
2003	The Twilight Zone	Liz	Episode: "The Executions of Grady Finch"
2004	Dark Kingdom: The Dragon King	Kriemhild	Television film
2007	Blue Smoke	Reena Hale	Television film
2007	Law & Order: Criminal Intent	Nola Falacci	Main role (season 7)
2008	Wainy Days	Laura	Episode: "Shelly II"
2008	Puppy Love	Claire	Series
2008	Two and a Half Men	Dolores Pasternak	Episode: "A Jock Strap in Hell"
2009–2012	The Mentalist	Rosalind Harker	3 episodes
2009–2011	Friday Night Lights	Cheryl	Recurring role (season 4)
2010	Edgar Floats	Sandra	Television film
2010	Backyard Wedding	Kim Tyler	Television film
2011	CSI: Miami	Michelle Baldwin	Episode: "Blood Lust"
2012	Person of Interest	Connie Wyler	Episode: "The High Road"
2013	A Very Merry Mix-Up	Alice Chapman	Television film
2013	A Snow Globe Christmas	Meg	Television film
2014	Kingdom	Melanie	Episode: "Flowers"
2014	Justified	Wendy Crowe	Recurring role (season 5)
2014	Christmas at Cartwright's	Nicky Talbot	Television film
2014	The Librarians	Lucinda McCabe / Morgan le Fay	Episode: "And the Rule of Three"
2015	House of Lies	Maya	2 episodes
2015	Elementary	Dana Powell	Episode: "When Your Number's Up"
2015	Don't Blink	herself	Episode: "The Art of Street Magic"
2015	I'm Not Ready for Christmas	Holly Nolan	Television film
2016	The Walking Dead	Paula	2 episodes
2016	Motive	Cindy Vernon	1 episode
2016	Nashville	Autumn Chase	Recurring role (season 4); guest role (season 6)
2016	Christmas List	Isobel Gray	Television film
2017	Supernatural	Lily Sunder	Episode: "Lily Sunder Has Some Regrets"
2017	Twin Peaks	Gersten Hayward	2 episodes
2017	The Exorcist	Nikki Kim	Recurring role
2017	The Mistletoe Inn	Kim Rossi	Television film
2018	Disjointed	Rosie Bush	Episode: "Helium Dream"
2018	Lore	Marjorie Cameron	Episode: "Jack Parsons: The Devil and the Divine"
2018	Christmas on Honeysuckle Lane	Emma	Television film
2019	Orange Is the New Black	Zelda	Recurring role (season 7)
2019	Our Christmas Love Song	Melody	Television film
2020	Christmas Tree Lane	Meg	Television film
2021–2022	Stargirl	Maggie Shaw	2 episodes (1 episode uncredited)
2022	The Disappearance of Cari Farver	Liz	Television film
2023	The Masked Singer	Dandelion/Herself	Season 9 contestant

== Stage credits ==
Year	Title	Theatre
2001	The Gift	Tiffany Theater, Los Angeles
2004	The Shape of Things	New Ambassadors Theatre, London
2006	Piano/Forte	Royal Court Theatre, London
2007	Dissonance	Williamstown Theatre Festival
2014	Reasons to Be Pretty	Geffen Playhouse, Los Angeles

== Accolades ==
Year	Award	Category	Nominated work	Result	Ref.
1994	Sundance Film Festival	Special Jury Recognition for Acting (shared with Renee Humphrey)	Fun	Won	
1995	Independent Spirit Awards	Best Debut Performance	Fun	Nominated	
1995	Gijón International Film Festival	Best Actress (shared with Renee Humphrey)	Fun	Won	
1996	Screen Actors Guild Awards	Outstanding Performance by an Ensemble in a Comedy Series (shared with Christine Baranski, Dedee Pfeiffer, Alan Rosenberg, Cybill Shepherd and Tom Wopat)	Cybill	Nominated	
1999	Saturn Awards	Best Young Actor/Actress	Urban Legend	Nominated	
2000	The Comedy Festival	Film Discovery Jury Award for Best Actor	Playing Mona Lisa	Won	

== Discography ==
=== Album ===
- Live at Rockwood (2012)
- Revisionary History (2015)
- The Conduit (2021)
- I Think I'm Spending Christmas with You (2024)
- Between Heaven and Earth (2026)
