= Tanner Hall (film) =

- Theatrical release poster
- Directed by: Tatiana von Fürstenberg; Francesca Gregorini
- Written by: Tatiana von Fürstenberg; Francesca Gregorini
- Produced by: Julie Snyder; Lucy Cooper
- Starring: Rooney Mara; Georgia King; Brie Larson; Amy Ferguson; Tom Everett Scott; Amy Sedaris
- Cinematography: Brian Rigney Hubbard
- Edited by: Michelle Botticelli; Sharon Marie Rutter; Lauren Zuckerman
- Music by: Roger Neill
- Production companies: Islander Films; Royalton Films
- Distributed by: Anchor Bay Films
- Release dates: September 14, 2009 (TIFF); September 9, 2011 (United States)
- Running time: 95 minutes
- Country: United States
- Language: English
- Budget: $3 million
- Box office: $5,000

Tanner Hall is a 2009 drama film about four girls coming of age in boarding school. It was written and directed by Tatiana von Fürstenberg and Francesca Gregorini. It stars Rooney Mara, Georgia King, Brie Larson, Amy Ferguson, Tom Everett Scott, and Amy Sedaris.

The film had its world premiere at the Toronto International Film Festival on September 14, 2009, before being released on September 9, 2011, by Anchor Bay Films.

== Plot ==
As Fernanda enters her senior year at Tanner Hall—a sheltered boarding school in New England, she is faced with unexpected changes in her group of friends when a childhood acquaintance, the charismatic yet manipulative troublemaker Victoria, appears. Shy and studious, Fernanda is usually the voice of reason among her friends—adventurous and sexy Kate and tomboy Lucasta. Jealous of Fernanda's relationship with a married man, Victoria sabotages Fernanda's plans and plots to publicly humiliate her.

== Cast ==
- Rooney Mara as Fernanda "Fern"
- Georgia King as Victoria
- Brie Larson as Kate
- Amy Ferguson as Lucasta
- Tom Everett Scott as Gio
- Amy Sedaris as Maggie Middlewood
- Chris Kattan as George Middlewood
- Shawn Pyfrom as Hank
- Ryan Schira as Peter
- Susie Misner as Roxanne, Fernanda's mother
- Tara Subkoff as Gwen
- Annika Peterson as Olga, Victoria's mother
- Alaina Lauren Steinberg as Margaret

== Release ==
It was the first feature film for von Fürstenberg and Gregorini that had its world premiere as an Official Selection at the Toronto International Film Festival in September 2009. It was well received at the Hamptons International Film Festival and was awarded the Grand Jury Prize for Best Feature at the Gen Art Film Festival. It was picked up by Anchor Bay Films, a division of Anchor Bay Entertainment, and was released in theaters September 2011. It was later released on Blu-ray and DVD on December 13, 2011. The extras contained audio commentaries by the directors and a trailer of the film.

== Reception ==
=== Critical response ===
Rotten Tomatoes gave the film a 12% score with critics (two of the seventeen reviews being positive) and 27% score with audiences, a "Rotten" rating for both. Aggregate review site Metacritic scored it 40 out of 100 from 10 reviews, indicating mixed or average.

=== Awards and nominations ===
Year	Festival	Category	Nominee	Result
2009	Hamptons International Film Festival	Breakthrough Performer – Rising Stars	Rooney Mara	Won
2010	GenArt Film Festival	Stargazer Award – GenArtist Emerging Actress Award	Rooney Mara	Won
