= The Upside of Anger =

- Theatrical release poster
- Directed by: Mike Binder
- Written by: Mike Binder
- Produced by: Jack Binder; Alex Gartner; Sammy Lee
- Starring: Joan Allen; Kevin Costner; Erika Christensen; Evan Rachel Wood; Keri Russell; Alicia Witt; Mike Binder
- Cinematography: Richard Greatrex
- Edited by: Steve Edwards; Robin Sales
- Music by: Alexandre Desplat; Kevin Sargent
- Production companies: Media 8 Entertainment; VIP Medienfonds; Sunlight Productions
- Distributed by: New Line Cinema (North America); Media 8 Entertainment (international)
- Release dates: January 23, 2005 (Sundance); March 11, 2005 (United States)
- Running time: 117 minutes
- Country: United States
- Language: English
- Budget: $12 million
- Box office: $28.2 million

The Upside of Anger is a 2005 American romantic comedy-drama film written and directed by Mike Binder and starring Joan Allen, Kevin Costner and Evan Rachel Wood. The film was produced by Alex Gartner, Sammy Lee and Jack Binder. It received mostly positive reviews with praise for Allen and Costner's performances, and was also a moderate box office success grossing $28.2 million from a $12 million budget.

== Plot ==
Beginning in medias res, the opening scene presents Terry Wolfmeyer and a friend, Denny Davies, attending a funeral.

The film flashes back to three years earlier, when a heavily intoxicated Terry announces to her daughters Hadley, Andy, Emily and Popeye that their father, Grey, has left the family to be with his secretary in Sweden.

Terry continues to drink heavily to cope with her anger and pain, which causes her daughters to resent her. She later shares the news about her husband with her neighbor Denny, a retired baseball player turned radio talk show host and fellow heavy drinker. They progressively grow closer, and eventually begin an intimate relationship.

Keen to help where he can, Denny helps Andy to become a production assistant at the radio station where he works. There she meets Shep, Denny's producer who is a questionable character in his 40s; Andy and Shep begin a relationship which disgusts and angers Terry.

Meanwhile Popeye, a high school student, pursues a romance with her classmate Gorden, but he reveals to her that he's gay. They instead become close friends, bonding over their respective broken homes.

Terry clashes with Emily, who wants to pursue a career as a professional ballet dancer and rejects her mother's desire for her to go to a traditional university. Emily ultimately relents and starts classes at University of Michigan at Ann Arbor, but is soon hospitalized for complications from an eating disorder. She returns home to recover and, after a night at the ballet with the entire family, Terry appears to accept Emily's desire to pursue dance. Meanwhile, Andy does well at her radio station job and soon outgrows her relationship with Shep.

Hadley graduates from college and immediately afterward tells her mother and sisters that she's pregnant and engaged to her longtime boyfriend, David. Terry reacts with anger that Hadley had not told her sooner or ever bothered to introduce her to David, leading to an embarrassing drunken scene at a lunch with David's parents.

When Popeye asks Denny what his long-term intentions are concerning his relationship with her mother, he decides to broach the subject with Terry. He is hit with anger and accusations that he is trying to push her into a marriage for which she feels unready. Weary and tired of Terry's ever-shifting moods, Denny confronts her and then storms out of her house. After a brief separation, Terry finally acknowledges the depth of her feelings for him, and they reunite.

When a real estate deal involving both Denny and Terry finally goes through, construction begins in the area surrounding their homes. A worker accidentally uncovers an abandoned, partially covered well, where Grey Wolfmeyer's body is found, revealing that he had never left his family. Rather, he had accidentally fallen in the well and died. Because Grey's secretary had abruptly returned to Sweden at the same time he disappeared, Terry believed he had run away with her.

As the story returns to the initial scene, the Wolfmeyers and Denny, now part of the family, leave Grey's funeral to reveal that Terry, while saddened and grieving, is coming to terms with her own and her daughters' life choices and, finally, finding some inner peace.

== Cast ==
- Joan Allen as Terry Wolfmeyer
- Kevin Costner as Denny Davies
- Alicia Witt as Hadley Wolfmeyer
- Keri Russell as Emily Wolfmeyer
- Erika Christensen as Andy Wolfmeyer
- Evan Rachel Wood as Lavender "Popeye" Wolfmeyer
- Mike Binder as Adam "Shep" Goodman
- Tom Harper as David Jr.
- Dane Christensen as Gorden Reiner
- Sarah Coomes as Anna Holstein
- Danny Webb as Grey Wolfmeyer
- Magdalena Manville as Darlene
- Suzanne Bertish as Gina
- David Firth as David Sr.
- Rod Woodruff as Dean Reiner
- Stephen Greif as Emily's doctor
- Arthur Penhallow as himself

== Production ==
Mike Binder wrote the role of Terry specifically for Joan Allen, having befriended the actress after working with her on the film The Contender. According to Binder in the "Making of" featurette on the film's DVD, the script was rejected by several major studios due to the casting of Allen (which goes unexplained); he and his producer brother Jack Binder then sought independent financing and renegotiated compensation deals with talent in order to complete the film. Binder said the film was able to get the green-light from studios when Kevin Costner was cast.

Much of the film was shot at Ealing Studios, London, with some scenes filmed in Bloomfield Hills, Michigan, a wealthy suburb of Detroit. At one point in the film, Detroit rock radio station WRIF serves as a backdrop.

Costner's character, Denny Davies, is believed to be based on Detroit Tigers pitcher Denny McLain. Like McLain, Davies is a retired player from the Detroit Tigers who later had a radio talk show (several still pictures of Costner from his 1999 film For Love of the Game, in which he played a Tigers pitcher named Billy Chapel, are used as posters in Davies' radio studio).

== Reception ==
=== Release ===
The Upside of Anger premiered in January 2005 at the Sundance Film Festival and went into a limited theatrical release in the U.S. on March 11, 2005.

=== Critical response ===
The film holds a 74% approval rating at Rotten Tomatoes based on 182 reviews, with an average rating of 6.5/10. The site's critical consensus reads: "A comedy/drama for grown-ups, with fine performances by Joan Allen and Kevin Costner."

Much praise was given to the performance of Joan Allen, with David Denby of The New Yorker calling her "rancorously funny" and Kirk Honeycutt of The Hollywood Reporter writing, "Allen turns the character into a tour de force that unleashes an unexpected comedy about compassion and self-loathing." Peter Travers of Rolling Stone wrote the film is "a fiercely funny human comedy with jokes that sting and leave marks."

Critic Roger Ebert gave the film 4 out of 4 stars writing, "I liked these characters precisely because they were not designed to be likable - or, more precisely, because they were likable in spite of being exasperating, unorganized, self-destructive and impervious to good advice." Scott Tobias of The A.V. Club noted the film's thematic similarities to American Beauty, another "dark suburban comedy leavened by the promise of arty redemption." He added, "So long as the tone stays mean and unpredictable, The Upside Of Anger has a coarse edge that's rare for mainstream cinema, helped along by the offbeat rapport between Allen and Costner."

Desson Thomson of The Washington Post liked "its gonzo-sitcom craziness, a situation that lends itself to enjoyable performances" and praised the four actresses who play the Wolfmeyer daughters. A. O. Scott of The New York Times did not think that the characters existed "in a credible dramatic context", yet admired how the film "edged a bit closer toward the emotional realities of modern adults." Marjorie Baumgarten of The Austin Chronicle thought the script "crackles with sharp dialogue and insight, although conversations frequently threaten to turn glib." She liked the "strong performances and the film's unflinching tone", yet was critical of the storytelling and "the many fictions that support the movie."

Multiple critics panned the ending. The Village Voice called it a "stupefying final twist, a stunning betrayal of audience trust," and A. O. Scott wrote it "warps the film's narrative logic beyond repair." Rick Groen of The Globe and Mail wrote, "Lots of movies have holes in the logic of their plot, but not the size of this yawning aperture - it's big enough to accommodate a Mack truck pulling a full load." Ebert defended the ending, writing, "Life can contain catastrophe, and life can cheat. The ending is the making of the movie, its transcendence, its way of casting everything in a new and ironic light, causing us to reevaluate what went before, and to regard the future with horror and pity. Without the ending, The Upside of Anger is a wonderfully made comedy of domestic manners. With it, the movie becomes larger and deeper."

== Awards and nominations ==
Award	Category	Nominee	Outcome	Ref.
Chicago Film Critics Association	Best Actress	Joan Allen	Won	
Critics' Choice Movie Awards	Best Actress	Joan Allen	Nominated	
Critics' Choice Movie Awards	Best Supporting Actor	Kevin Costner	Nominated	
Online Film Critics Society	Best Actress	Joan Allen	Nominated	
San Francisco Film Critics Circle	Best Supporting Actor	Kevin Costner	Won	
Satellite Awards	Best Musical or Comedy Actress	Joan Allen	Nominated	
Satellite Awards	Best Musical or Comedy Actor	Kevin Costner	Nominated	

== Home media ==
The Upside of Anger was released on DVD from New Line Home Entertainment on July 26, 2005.
