= Fourplay (2001 film) =

2001 film by Mike Binder

- UK DVD cover
- Directed by: Mike Binder
- Written by: Mike Binder
- Produced by: Jack Binder; David Zuckerman (exec.)
- Starring: Colin Firth; Mike Binder; Irène Jacob; Mariel Hemingway
- Cinematography: Sue Gibson
- Edited by: Christopher S. Baird
- Music by: Steve Salani
- Distributed by: The Asylum (USA)
- Release date: 2001
- Running time: 87 minutes
- Countries: United States; United Kingdom
- Language: English

Fourplay (also known as Londinium) is a 2001 American-British romantic comedy film.

== Plot ==
Fourplay follows the romantically entwined lives of a TV writer, producer, actress and makeup artist. Ben Greene (Binder) is an American comic writer who comes to Britain to write for a show, Telford Gate. The star of the show, Carly Matthews-Portland (Hemingway), is married to the producer, Allan (Firth). Carly decides to help Greene, by setting him up on a date with a French makeup artist, Fiona Delgrazia (Irène Jacob). As the movie progresses, the lives of the couples become more entwined and they each decide if they are in the right relationship or not.

== Cast ==
- Colin Firth as Allen Portland
- Mike Binder as Ben Greene
- Irène Jacob as Fiona Delgrazia
- Mariel Hemingway as Carly Matthews Portland
- Stephen Fry as Nigel Steele
- Jack Dee as Glen
- Christopher Lawford as Davis
- Stephen Marcus as Davey
- Vincent Grass as Fiona's Father

== Reception ==
The film did not receive many reviews. The critic at scoopy.net gave it a D, suggesting it would not even appeal to fans of the genre. Qwipster found the movie "Tepid at best".

== Home release ==
Released on DVD on December 7, 2004.
