= Mike Binder =

American actor (born 1958)

- Born: June 2, 1958 (age 68); Detroit, Michigan, U.S.
- Occupations: Director; screenwriter; stand-up comedian; producer; actor
- Children: 2
- Relatives: Jack Binder (brother)

Mike Binder (born June 2, 1958) is an American filmmaker, stand-up comedian, and actor.

== Life and career ==
Binder, descended from Russian-Jewish immigrants, grew up in the Detroit suburb of Birmingham. During the summers of 1966 through 1975, he attended Camp Tamakwa, a summer camp in Algonquin Provincial Park in Ontario, Canada; that experience was the inspiration (and the filming location) for his 1993 film Indian Summer.

Binder began his career as a screenwriter and standup comedian, in 1990 with the March 9 theatrical premiere of his first screenplay, Coupe de Ville, directed by Joe Roth and co-produced by Binder, and his own HBO stand up comedy special, broadcast the following night.

Binder's directorial debut was with his second screenplay, 1992's Crossing the Bridge.

Binder gained further prominence with his 20-episode 2001-02 HBO comedy series, The Mind of the Married Man, which he co-wrote, co-directed and starred in as the central character "Micky Barnes". That same year, his independently produced film The Sex Monster won "Best Film" and Binder won "Best Actor" at the 2001 Comedy Arts Festival in Aspen.

Binder wrote and directed three mid-2000s films in which he also played supporting roles. The first, The Upside of Anger, starring Joan Allen and Kevin Costner, premiered at the January 2005 Sundance Film Festival; thirteen months later, Man About Town with Ben Affleck, was first seen at the February 2006 Santa Barbara International Film Festival and, after another 13 months, Reign Over Me was released; Binder directed, wrote, and appeared in the film, starring Adam Sandler and Don Cheadle. His most recent film is 2014's Black or White, starring Kevin Costner and Octavia Spencer.

As an actor, Binder has appeared in Steven Spielberg's Minority Report with Tom Cruise, Rod Lurie's The Contender with Joan Allen, and Rebecca Miller's The Private Lives of Pippa Lee with Robin Wright Penn. He also appeared in Season 2, Episode 10 of Curb Your Enthusiasm (2001).

Binder has directed many of the screenplays he has written, and has acted in a number of them as well. As a writer, he has written screenplays for Steven Spielberg, Julia Roberts, Robert Zemeckis, Jim Carrey, Adam Sandler, Tim Allen and Reese Witherspoon.

Binder's first novel, Keep Calm, a thriller set in the UK, was published in 2016.

Binder directed stand-up comedian Bill Burr's 2019 Netflix comedy special Paper Tiger.

On October 4, 2020, his five-part documentary series The Comedy Store which was based on the years he spent at The Comedy Store comedy club and features interviews with many of the major comedians who appeared at the famous nightclub, aired on Showtime.

== Filmography ==
=== Film ===
Year	Title	Director	Writer	Producer
1990	Coupe de Ville	No	Yes	Yes
1992	Crossing the Bridge	Yes	Yes	No
1993	Indian Summer	Yes	Yes	No
1994	Blankman	Yes	No	No
1999	The Sex Monster	Yes	Yes	No
2001	Fourplay	Yes	Yes	No
2001	The Search for John Gissing	Yes	Yes	No
2005	The Upside of Anger	Yes	Yes	No
2006	Man About Town	Yes	Yes	No
2007	Reign Over Me	Yes	Yes	No
2014	Black or White	Yes	Yes	Yes

Acting roles

Year	Title	Role
1994	Blankman	Dr. Victor Norris
1999	The Sex Monster	Marty Barnes
2000	The Contender	Lewis Hollis
2001	Fourplay	Ben Greene
2001	The Search for John Gissing	Matthew Barnes
2002	Minority Report	Leo Crow
2005	The Upside of Anger	Adam "Shep" Goodman
2006	Man About Town	Morty
2007	Reign Over Me	Bryan Sugarman
2009	The Private Lives of Pippa Lee	Sam Shapiro
2011	Fanboy	Acting coach
2011	One Day	Dexter's agent (Uncredited)

=== Television ===
Year	Title	Director	Writer	Producer	Notes
2001–2002	The Mind of the Married Man	Yes	Yes	No	Also creator; Directed 3 episodes
2009	Two Dollar Beer	No	Yes	executive	Unaired pilot
2016	Billions	Yes	No	No	Episode "All the Wilburys"
2017–2018	Nashville	Yes	No	No	3 episodes
2017–2018	Ray Donovan	No	Yes	Yes	Wrote 3 episodes
2019	Paper Tiger	Yes	No	No	Stand-up comedy special
2020	The Comedy Store	Yes	Yes	Yes	Documentary

Acting roles

Year	Title	Role
1993	Roseanne	Mike
2001–2002	The Mind of the Married Man	Micky Barnes
2020	The Comedy Store	Himself
