= The Reef (1999 film) =

- Based on: The Reef by Edith Wharton
- Written by: William Hanley
- Directed by: Robert Allan Ackerman
- Starring: Sela Ward; Timothy Dalton; Alicia Witt
- Music by: Patrick Williams
- Country of origin: United States; Czech Republic; Germany
- Original language: English

Production
- Executive producers: Freyda Rothstein; William Hanley; Robert Allan Ackerman
- Producer: Gideon Amir
- Cinematography: Sandi Sissel
- Editor: Susan B. Browdy
- Running time: 88 minutes
- Production company: Hearst Entertainment Entertainment Productions

Original release
- Network: CBS
- Release: July 25, 1999

The Reef (also known as Passion's Way) is a 1999 American-Czech-German made-for-television historical drama film directed by Robert Allan Ackerman based on the book The Reef by Edith Wharton. It starred Sela Ward, Timothy Dalton, Alicia Witt, Jamie Glover. It was filmed in Prague, Czech Republic in 1996 but did not premiere on CBS until July 25, 1999.

== Plot ==
In early 20th century France, a young widow renews her love with a man until she discovers that he had a past relationship with one of her new employees, who is a nanny. This makes the two women accuse each other for particular reasons until the end of the movie.

== Cast ==
- Sela Ward - Anna Leath
- Timothy Dalton - Charles Darrow
- Alicia Witt - Sophy Viner
- Jamie Glover - Owen Leath
- Cynthia Harris - Adelaide
- Leslie Caron - Regine De Chantelle
- Hannah Taylor-Gordon - Effie Leath
- Rupert Frazer - Mr Farlow
- Jane Bertish - Mrs Farlow
- Robert Russell - Messenger
