= Sophie Flack =

American novelist (b. 1983)

- Born: August 8, 1983 (age 43); Watertown, Massachusetts, U.S.
- Education: Columbia University (BA)
- Occupations: Author; journalist; editor
- Spouse: Josh Charles (m. 2013)
- Children: 2
- Parent(s): Fran Forman; Bob Flack

Sophie Flack (born August 8, 1983) is an American author, freelance writer and editor, and former dancer with the New York City Ballet.

== Early life and education ==
Flack was born in Watertown, Massachusetts, to a family of Jewish background. She moved to New York City at 15 to train at The School of American Ballet. Flack joined the New York City Ballet as a member of the corps de ballet in 2001, and retired from dance in 2009. Her novel Bunheads was published in 2011. Flack earned her BA from Columbia University in 2013.

== Personal life ==
She married actor Josh Charles in 2013. On December 9, 2014, she gave birth to their first child, a son. On August 22, 2018, Flack gave birth to their second child, a daughter.

== Career ==
Flack danced with the New York City Ballet from 2001 until 2009. Her novel, Bunheads, inspired by her life in the corps de ballet, was published in October 2011 by Little, Brown and Company.

== Works ==
- Flack, Sophie (2011). Bunheads. New York: Poppy. ISBN 978-0-316-12653-3. - Bunheads follows a 19-year-old girl named Hannah Ward as she trains as a ballet dancer for the Manhattan Ballet School. Hannah struggles with the demands of her training including maintaining weight, dealing with delayed puberty, and making free time for hobbies and love interests.
