= Keep Calm (novel) =

2016 novel by Mike Binder

- First edition
- Author: Mike Binder
- Language: English
- Published: February 2, 2016
- Publisher: Henry Holt and Company
- Publication place: United States
- Pages: 384
- ISBN: 978-1-62779-347-6

Keep Calm, a thriller set in the United Kingdom, it's the 2016 debut novel by Mike Binder.

== Plot ==
Adam Tatum, an American ex-cop, is tricked into a plot to overthrow the British prime minister.

== Critical reception ==
Publishers Weekly called Keep Calm "gripping" and a "tense political thriller."

Kirkus Reviews wrote in its review, "It’s one thing for thrills to come cheap, but they needn't be so unimaginative or so lacking in finesse."
