= Man About Town (2006 film) =

2006 American film

- Promotional movie poster for the film
- Directed by: Mike Binder
- Written by: Mike Binder
- Produced by: Jack Binder; Derek F.C. Elliott; Ogden Gavanski
- Starring: Ben Affleck; Rebecca Romijn; John Cleese; Bai Ling; Jerry O'Connell
- Cinematography: Russ T. Alsobrook
- Edited by: Roger Nygard
- Music by: Larry Groupé
- Production company: Sunlight Productions
- Distributed by: Lionsgate
- Release dates: February 7, 2006 (Santa Barbara Film Festival); February 13, 2007 (United States)
- Running time: 100 minutes
- Country: United States
- Language: English

Man About Town is a 2006 American comedy-drama film written and directed by Mike Binder and produced by Sunlight Productions and independently presented by Media 8 Entertainment. The film stars Ben Affleck, Rebecca Romijn, John Cleese, Bai Ling, and Jerry O'Connell.

In the United States, it was released direct-to-DVD on February 13, 2007; however, the film was theatrically released in many countries around the world.

== Plot ==
Top Hollywood talent agent Jack Giamoro (Ben Affleck) seems to have it all: a successful career, a lot of money, a nice car, a beautiful wife. However, while pursuing success, he somehow lost himself and neglected his marriage. He decides to take a journal writing class to do some self-searching. Jack's seemingly perfect world starts to unravel when he learns that his wife, Nina (Rebecca Romijn), is cheating on him with his most important client. Things get worse when Barbi (Bai Ling), an ambitious journalist, steals Jack's journal, which contains secrets that could ruin him personally and professionally. Jack is forced to fight for everything he has worked so hard to achieve and in doing so, he attains the self-insight he was looking for. By realizing that there is more to life than work, he begins to focus on what's most important in his life.

== Cast ==
- Ben Affleck as Jack Giamoro
- Rebecca Romijn as Nina Giamoro
- Howard Hesseman as Ben Giamoro
- John Cleese as Dr. Primkin
- Mike Binder as Morty
- Gina Gershon as Arlene Kreiner
- Bai Ling as Barbi Ling
- Adam Goldberg as Phil Balow
- Damien Wayans as Lucky Reynolds
- Kal Penn as Alan Fineberg
- Amber Valletta as Brynn Lilly
- Jerry O'Connell as David Lilly
- Samuel Ball as Jimmy Dooley

== Soundtrack ==
1. "Basic Instinct" – written by Jerry Goldsmith
2. "Cucurrucucu Paloma" – written by Tomás Méndez; arranged and performed by Fredo Viola
3. "I Got It" – written by John Krautner and Robert Harlow; performed by The Go
4. "Our Lips Are Sealed" – written by Terrence Edward Hall and Jane Wiedlin; arranged and performed by Fredo Viola
5. "Red States" – written and performed by Fredo Viola
6. "The Sad Song" – written and performed by Fredo Viola

== Critical reception ==
DVD Talk, "Some of the worst screenwriting and directorial lethargy I've seen in the last year."

The A.V. Club, "The film's disparate strains come together in a clattering farcical climax, but precious little seems to be at stake."

== Home media ==
Lionsgate Entertainment distributed the film on DVD in the US. The DVD included the bonus features "Visual Journaling", "Talk to My Agent", deleted scenes, and bloopers. It contained a 16×9 widescreen version, 5.1 and 2.0 Dolby Digital audio, English and Spanish subtitles, and English closed captions.
