= The Search for John Gissing =

2001 film by Mike Binder

- Promotional poster
- Directed by: Mike Binder
- Written by: Mike Binder
- Produced by: Jack Binder; Marc Frydman; James Harbaugh
- Starring: Alan Rickman; Mike Binder; Janeane Garofalo
- Cinematography: Sue Gibson
- Edited by: Roger Nygard
- Music by: Larry Groupé
- Release date: 2001
- Running time: 91 minutes
- Country: United States
- Language: English

The Search for John Gissing is a 2001 comedy film written, directed by, and starring Mike Binder, produced by Jack Binder, also starring Alan Rickman, Janeane Garofalo, set in London. The film won Best Picture at the 2002 Sarasota Film Festival. Binder plays Matthew Barnes is a young executive on the move, who finds himself a pawn in corporate in-fighting when he's sent to London to oversee a merger. He's to replace John Gissing. However Gissing gets wind of it, and makes sure that Matthew and his wife Linda, who has come to England with Matthew, have a miserable first few days there.

== Plot ==
Matthew Barnes arrives in London from Chicago with his wife, Linda, to oversee a high-profile merger between his employer, Compu-Corps, and a powerful German corporation. Although Barnes has corresponded with the company representative he was assigned to, John Gissing, the two have never met face-to-face. The Barneses’ first impression of London is immediately troubled when Gissing fails to meet them at Heathrow Airport to take them to a rented home, instead calling Barnes to meet him at the Compu-Corps London office.

Upon arriving at the office, however, the Barneses discover the building closed, and a hostile janitor informs them that Gissing has already left, leaving Barnes frustrated. Gissing soon contacts Barnes again and explains that the company has instead reserved a luxury hotel suite for them. Relieved, the couple travels to the hotel, only to discover that the suite actually belongs to François “Fuller” Feulliere, the chairman of Compu-Corps–Barnes had been given François’ reservation details. Barnes tries to reserve another room using his own credit card, but the transaction is declined, effectively stranding the couple.

Desperate for help, Matthew and Linda encounter Sister Mary, a seemingly kind Spanish nun who offers them shelter at her convent. Grateful, they accept her hospitality. During the evening, however, Sister Mary becomes increasingly sexual, aggressively attempting to seduce Matthew the next morning.

As Barnes attempts to regain control of the merger negotiations, Gissing continues sabotaging him at every opportunity. Barnes is given an incomplete address for Gissing’s home, forcing him to waste hours searching through London neighborhoods. He later misses an important corporate presentation after Gissing deliberately provides him with the wrong meeting time. Taking advantage of Barnes’s absence, Gissing delivers the presentation himself, effectively portraying Matthew as unreliable. Matthew locates Gissing’s residence and secretly follows him back to the office. There, Gissing reveals the reason for his hostility: he discovered an internal memo indicating that Barnes was poised to replace him. After handling the presentation, Gissing has instead secured authority over the merger and continued tenure, while Barnes faces reassignment to another office.

Matthew retaliates by breaking into Gissing’s office and tampering with his presentation documents. He also manipulates the timing of a critical executive meeting, resulting in Gissing’s dismissal, and Barnes tasked to oversee the merger, though in a diminished role, and eventually to be transferred to Detroit.

Gissing visits the Barneses and proposes an alliance, explaining if Compu-Corps executives lose confidence in the merger and reinstate him as a consultant, he stands to receive a lucrative 5 million pound consultancy fee and offers Barnes half in exchange for helping him. Matthew initially refuses, but Gissing reveals a hidden clause buried within the merger documents that could potentially destroy the entire company if left unresolved.

Barnes and Gissing orchestrate a plan to regain influence over the merger, Gissing recruiting his girlfriend, revealed to be Sister Mary, to participate in the scheme, and Barnes enlisting Linda and their taxi driver friend, Dexter, to impersonate German executives during negotiations. The fake executives successfully unsettle Compu-Corps leadership, leading Francois to fear the merger is collapsing. Meanwhile, the real German representatives arrive early. Hoping to stabilize the negotiations, Francois reluctantly agrees to rehire Gissing only as protection against Barnes’s assumed incompetence.

During the negotiations, Barnes distracts executive Giles Hannigan, one of Gissing’s harshest critics, by having Linda impersonate the fake nun. Hannigan eventually agrees to support Gissing’s consultancy role, allowing the merger to proceed. Despite their apparent success, Linda becomes disillusioned with the manipulative corporate culture surrounding them, and convinces Matthew that the company doesn’t actually value him, and he resigns altogether.

The acquisition ultimately succeeds, but Feulliere and the other senior executives are removed, while Gissing successfully manipulates his own appointment as worldwide chairman. Matthew and Linda choose to remain in London, where they begin a new life together and raise their newborn son.

== Cast ==
- Alan Rickman — John Gissing
- Mike Binder — Matthew Barnes
- Janeane Garofalo — Linda Barnes
- Sonya Walger — Sister Mary
- Juliet Stevenson — Gwyneth Moore
- Allan Corduner — Francois "Fuller" Feulliere
- Owen Teale— Giles Hanagan
- Nigel Terry — Alan Jardeen
- Frank Harper — Dexter
- James Lance — Donny
- Lee Oakes — Carl Gissing
- Angela Pleasence — Johanna Frielduct
- Tim Briggs — Hotel Clerk
- Caroline Holdaway — Gissing's assistant

== Response ==
Not having found an appropriate distribution deal, Sunlight Productions set the film aside following its festival premieres. Shortly thereafter, an online petition was formed in a plea for the release of the film, garnering more than 3,000 signatures. Mike and Jack Binder's Sunlight Productions made the film available online.

== Awards and nominations ==
=== Awards won ===
- Sarasota Film Festival Film Critics Award: Best Film

=== Official selection ===
- AFI Fest 2001
- Hamptons International Film Festival 2002
- Rome Film Festival 2002
- Palm Springs International Film Festival 2002
- U.S. Comedy Arts Festival Aspen 2002
- South by Southwest
- Newport Beach Film Festival 2002
- Victoria Film Festival 2002
- Raindance Film Festival

== Releases ==
This film was released on UK DVD by Simply Media 2 July 2018.
