= The Sex Monster =

1999 American comedy film by Mike Binder

- Directed by: Mike Binder
- Written by: Mike Binder
- Produced by: Jack Binder; Scott Stephens
- Starring: Mariel Hemingway; Mike Binder; Renée Humphrey; Christopher Lawford; Kevin Pollak; Stephen Baldwin; Anita Barone
- Cinematography: Keith L. Smith
- Edited by: Erik C. Andersen
- Production companies: Trimark Pictures; Sun-lite Pictures
- Distributed by: Trimark Pictures (Theatrical release); Lionsgate Films (Digital release)
- Release date: May 15, 1999
- Running time: 98 minutes
- Country: United States
- Language: English

The Sex Monster is a 1999 American comedy film written and directed by Mike Binder, produced by Jack Binder and Scott Stephens, and starring Mariel Hemingway and Mike Binder.

== Plot ==
Martin "Marty" Barnes, a businessman who works as a building contractor in Los Angeles, tries to improve his sex life with his wife Laura by encouraging her to have a threesome involving another woman. Though Marty is fortunate enough to find that Laura likes the idea, he is not prepared for her coming to prefer women to men, and seducing other women including Marty's own secretary.

== Reception ==
Critical reception was mixed. A reviewer for the BBC said the film was "slight but often amusing." Film critic Nathan Rabin negatively reviewed the movie as "awkward and embarrassing" and not funny. Variety critic Todd McCarthy said it was cheesy but a "lowbrow audience pleaser, provided no expectations are involved", and noted that the movie did not have any nudity. The director, Binder, told another reviewer that "the sex is all off-camera...that's part of the joke." The Advocate said that Hemingway "has a great time spoofing her overearnest screen persona."

The Sex Monster was shown at the Frameline Film Festival in 2000. It was also shown at the U.S. Comedy Arts Festival in 2000, where it was awarded best feature film of the festival's film showcase.

== Cast ==
- Mike Binder as Marty Barnes
- Mariel Hemingway as Laura Barnes
- Renée Humphrey as Didi
- Taylor Nichols as Billy
- Missy Crider as Diva
- Christopher Lawford as Dave Pembroke
- Joanna Heimbold as Evie Pembroke
- Kevin Pollak as Dr. Jerry Berman
- Stephen Baldwin as Murphy
- Anita Barone as Carol
- Kara Zediker as Ellen
- Marisol Nichols as Lucia
- Holland Taylor as Muriel

== See also ==
- Media portrayals of bisexuality
- List of feature films with bisexual characters
