= Doug Williams (comedian) =

American comedian

- Born: Douglas Williams; June 25, 1969 (age 57); Montgomery, Alabama, U.S.

Comedy career
- Years active: 1990–present
- Medium: comedy, television, film
- Genre: Observational comedy

Doug Williams (born June 25, 1969) is an American comedian from Montgomery, Alabama.

== Early life and education ==
Williams was born in Montgomery, Alabama. He began performing stand-up comedy in 1990, five years before graduating from Alabama State University in 1995.

== Career ==
After college, Williams moved to Los Angeles where he landed small roles in the 1996 remake of The Nutty Professor and First Kid. Since then, he has had guest roles on many sitcoms, including The Bernie Mac Show.

Doug Williams has served as host and executive producer of "Martin Lawrence Presents 1st Amendment Stand-up" for the past four seasons.

Williams voiced plans to co-write his own TV sitcom titled Domestic Doug. The show centered around protagonist "Doug Salter", a stand-up comedian trying to make it in Hollywood, not unlike Williams himself. The project never came to fruition.

=== Emmitt Smith roast ===
Doug Williams gained internet notoriety in the mid-2000s when a clip of him at a 2002 roasting of Emmitt Smith surfaced on the internet. Jamie Foxx, who hosted the event, continuously interrupted Williams' performance, speaking into his own microphone and making sarcastic remarks, acting as Williams's conscience; "Maybe I should say something nice about Emmitt and... wrap it up", "or maybe I should say something about how black people have to struggle. Yeah, that'll get em on my side."

In February 2010, Williams spoke about the incident in an interview with LAist: "I think a lot of people read more into it than it was. It was a roast, I'm not a roast-type of comedian. The situation just kind of caught me off-guard. I was new at the time. I was new to that environment. I was new to roasting. It's one of those things that happened and I'm better for it. It was a long time ago, I've learned a lot since then and I've come a long way since then." He added, "At that time, Jamie Foxx was an established well known comedian. Nobody knew who I was. It was a situation where no matter what happened, I wasn't going to get the best of him in that setting."

== Filmography ==
=== Film ===
Year	Title	Role	Notes
1996	The Nutty Professor	Band Leader	
1996	First Kid	Eddie	
2001	Lip Service	Lamont	
2002	Three Picture Deal	Big Cool Daddy	
2007	Love... & Other 4 Letter Words	Driver	
2010	Speed-Dating	Big D	
2010	My Girlfriend's Back	Jay	
2011	Fanaddict	Richard	
2014	Blood Lines	JB	
2018	The Truth About Marriage	—N/a	Documentary
2019	Tellers	Shawn	

=== Television ===
Year	Title	Role	Notes
2001–2002	The Mind of the Married Man	Kevin	9 episodes
2005	The Bernie Mac Show	Alex	Episode: "For Whom the Belt Tolls"
2006	Close to Home	Myles Burke	Episode: "Privilege"
2008	Domestic Doug	Doug Salter	Television film
2010	Stand Up for Family	Comic #4	Television film
