= A Very Merry Mix-Up =

2013 American-Canadian television film

- Promotional photo
- Genre: Romance
- Written by: Barbara Kymlicka
- Directed by: Jonathan Wright
- Starring: Alicia Witt; Mark Wiebe; Scott Gibson
- Theme music composer: Stacey Hersh
- Countries of origin: United States; Canada
- Original language: English
- No. of episodes: 1

Production
- Executive producers: Lewis Chesler; David Daniels; David Perlmutter; Dominique Telson; Robert Vaughn; Kevin Commins
- Producer: Marek Posival
- Cinematography: Russ Goozee
- Editor: Marvin Lawrence
- Running time: 87 minutes
- Production company: Chesler/Perlmutter Productions

Original release
- Network: Hallmark Channel
- Release: November 10, 2013

A Very Merry Mix-Up is a 2013 American/Canadian romance television film directed by Jonathan Wright and starring Alicia Witt, Mark Wiebe, and Scott Gibson. The film premiered on the Hallmark Channel on November 10, 2013.

== Plot ==
A beautiful antique store owner, Alice Chapman (Alicia Witt), travels to her fiancé's hometown alone to meet her future in-laws for the first time at their Christmas gathering. Her fiancé, successful realtor Will Mitchum (Scott Gibson), tells her he will join them after closing an important business deal. Upon her arrival at the airport, she discovers that her luggage is lost. While completing the necessary paperwork, she meets Matt Mitchum (Mark Wiebe), who is also filling out a missing baggage report. She is surprised to learn that Matt is the brother of her fiancé "Billy". On their way to the family home, they get into a car accident and both end up in the hospital, where Alice learns that Matt broke off his engagement to a woman who refused to "walk through the rain" for him.

Will's mother and father arrive at the hospital and are surprised to learn that their son "Billy" is engaged, yet they quickly make Alice feel like a loved new member of the family. Meanwhile, Will is told that Alice's store needs to be sold to his wealthy client in order to close an important deal. Will assures the client that he can get her to sell. Back at the house, Alice and Matt share their Christmas memories with each other and bake Christmas cookies. She learns that Matt shares her romantic interest in antiques, old family photos, and Charlie Brown Christmas trees, and soon they become attracted to each other. As Alice talks about Will, the family seems surprised at some of the details she shares about their "Billy".

When "Billy" Mitchum finally arrives, Alice is shocked to see that "Billy" is not her fiancée, Will, and realizes that she's been sharing Christmas with the wrong Mitchum family. Alice calls Will and soon Will shows up to pick her up to take her back to his family's Christmas gathering. Matt's family is saddened to see her go. Before leaving, Alice gives Matt, the man who "makes her laugh", a kiss goodbye. When she meets Will's family, she is left disillusioned by the air kisses of her future mother-in-law and Will's all-business father, a world away from Matt's family. That night, Matt comes to Will's family house and takes Alice to a nearby park where he shows her the benches he built bearing quotes from Shakespeare.

On Christmas Eve, Alice calls Matt's family to wish them a Merry Christmas, but Matt feels he is unable to talk with her. With the "new Mitchums", Alice tries to play the game taught to her by the "other Mitchums"— where everyone writes something nice about someone else and each tries to guess who said what, but Will's family is not nearly as interesting or loving as Matt's family. During the game, Will announces that he has "closed" a huge deal involving the sale of Alice's store for $3.5 million. Alice is revolted by Will's insensitivity, and tells him that she cannot marry him. Will realizes that something has changed in their relationship and accepts her decision.

Alice rushes to the park where she sees and embraces Matt, confessing that she is the "girl who loves family and romance" and that she is the girl who loves him. They kiss and walk off into the snowy Christmas night together.

== Cast ==
- Alicia Witt as Alice Chapman
- Mark Wiebe as Matt Mitchum
- Scott Gibson as Will Mitchum
- Mimi Kuzyk as Judith
- Judah Katz as Roy
- Lawrence Dane as Grandpa Charles
- Richard Fitzpatrick as Joe Mitchum
- Susan Hogan as Penny Mitchum
- Howard Hoover as Grant Lockley
- Alison Jutzi as Airport Employee
- Justin Mader as Billy Mitchum
- Russell Yuen as Dr. Stark

== Critical response ==
In her review for the Movie Fan Central website, Mrs. Data gave the film 6.5 out of 10 stars, calling it a "cute and sweet TV movie". Data wrote that Witt was "really adorable and real as the female lead" and that she had good chemistry with Wiebe. Data also noted that while Weibe's on-screen family felt like a "genuine group", most of the other characters come across "very perfect", that they "only exist in movies".

In his review for the Movie Buff website, Matt Christopher gave the film a grade of C, calling it "predictable" with "cliche" characters.

== See also ==
- List of Christmas films
