= Reign Over Me =

2007 American buddy drama film by Mike Binder

- Theatrical release poster
- Directed by: Mike Binder
- Written by: Mike Binder
- Produced by: Jack Binder; Michael Rotenberg
- Starring: Adam Sandler; Don Cheadle; Jada Pinkett Smith; Liv Tyler; Saffron Burrows; Donald Sutherland
- Cinematography: Russ Alsobrook
- Edited by: Steve Edwards; Jeremy Roush
- Music by: Rolfe Kent
- Production companies: Columbia Pictures; Relativity Media; Madison 23 Productions; Sunlight Productions
- Distributed by: Sony Pictures Releasing
- Release dates: March 22, 2007 (Australia); March 23, 2007 (United States)
- Running time: 124 minutes
- Country: United States
- Language: English
- Budget: $20 million
- Box office: $22 million

Reign Over Me is a 2007 American buddy drama film written and directed by Mike Binder, produced by his brother Jack Binder, and starring Adam Sandler, Don Cheadle, Jada Pinkett Smith, Liv Tyler, Saffron Burrows, and Donald Sutherland. The film follows the story of former college roommates and old friends Alan and Charlie, the latter of whom is struggling with depression after the death of his wife and daughters in the September 11 attacks. This was Melinda Dillon's final film role.

Distributed by Columbia Pictures, the film was theatrically released on March 23, 2007, and on DVD and Blu-ray on October 9, 2007. It is the first of two films produced by Madison 23 Productions, a drama subsidiary of Sandler's Happy Madison Productions.

== Plot ==
Alan Johnson is a successful dentist who lives with his wife, his two daughters and his parents in New York City, but is bored with his life. One evening, he runs into his long-ago college roommate and fellow dental student Charlie Fineman in the street. Charlie seems lost and does not recognize Alan at first, but they begin spending time together.

Charlie is suffering from PTSD because of the loss of his wife and daughters on one of the planes that struck the World Trade Center on 9/11; he is living as a recluse in an almost-empty apartment on money from an insurance policy and from the government's compensation fund. He spends much of his time repeatedly renovating his kitchen and playing an addictive video game, and constantly listens to music through headphones to cut himself off from the world. Alan heard about Charlie's loss at the time of the attack, but was unable to get in touch with him.

Angela Oakhurst is a therapist who has an office in the same building as Alan; one of her patients, Donna Remar, makes a pass at Alan and he rebuffs her, after which she makes a false sexual assault accusation against him. She eventually retracts her accusation and apologizes to him for her behavior.

Ginger Timpleman, Charlie's former mother-in-law, approaches Alan; she expresses concern about Charlie and says he needs a therapist and also needs family. He is shutting her and her husband out of his life, and they are the closest family he has.

Alan spends more and more time with Charlie, and after a while his wife gets fed up with his frequent late nights as well as his failure to communicate with her. One night, Alan receives news that his father has died, and he sadly witnesses Charlie's inability to process the fact that he is grieving. Charlie apologizes the next day, acknowledging that Alan is his only friend. Alan becomes concerned about Charlie's sudden, inexplicable fits of rage. Charlie becomes infatuated with Donna.

Alan finally convinces Charlie to see a therapist and introduces him to Angela. Barely communicative, Charlie ends every session with her after only a couple of minutes. After several sessions, Angela tells him that if he will not open up to her, he needs to tell his story to someone. He goes out into her waiting room and starts talking to Alan about his family as Angela listens in. He explains why they were on the hijacked flight from Boston to Los Angeles.

Alone at home, Charlie breaks down and takes a pistol out of a box, then goes outside and attempts to commit suicide by cop, after which he is taken to hospital for a psychiatric evaluation. After the evaluation, the District Attorney's office, with the Timplemans' agreement, applies to have a judge commit Charlie to psychiatric care for a year. At a hearing, Charlie suffers a breakdown when the Assistant District Attorney insensitively displays photos of his family in open court. The judge says he will leave the commitment decision to the Timplemans, but he asks them to think, before the next hearing, of what their daughter would want them to do.

After hearing Donna tell Angela that his only problem is a broken heart, Charlie approaches the Timplemans in the lobby of the courthouse and tells them he does not need to talk about his wife or look at pictures of her, because he sees her and his daughters every day in the faces of people walking down the street; he kisses Ginger before leaving. Before the hearing, Charlie moves out of his apartment; Alan tells the Timplemans they will have to wait to be part of his life for now, and they agree to tell the judge Charlie should not be committed.

Alan has Donna visit Charlie in his new apartment. As he is leaving, his wife calls him. He apologizes for shutting her out, and she tells Alan she loves him and just wants him to come home.

== Cast ==
- Adam Sandler as Charlie Fineman
- Don Cheadle as Alan Johnson
- Jada Pinkett Smith as Janeane Johnson
- Liv Tyler as Angela Oakhurst, Charlie's therapist
- Saffron Burrows as Donna Remar, Alan's patient
- Donald Sutherland as Judge Raines
- Robert Klein as Jonathan Timpleman, Charlie's father in-law
- Melinda Dillon as Ginger Timpleman, Charlie's mother in-law
- Mike Binder as Bryan Sugarman, Charlie's pre-tragedy best friend
- Ted Raimi as Peter Saravino, Charlie's lawyer
- Paula Newsome as Melanie, Alan's receptionist
- Anthony Chisholm as William Johnson
- B. J. Novak as Mr. Fallon, assistant DA
- John de Lancie as Nigel Pennington, a therapist
- Jonathan Banks as Stelter, Alan's dental practice partner
- Denise Dowse as a psychiatric hospital therapist
- Paul Butler as George Johnson

== Soundtrack ==
The many songs during the film include Bruce Springsteen's "Out in the Street" and "Drive All Night", "Simple Man" by Graham Nash, and a few songs by the Who, including the titular "Love, Reign o'er Me". The latter appears on the film's soundtrack, along with a cover version recorded specifically for the film by Pearl Jam.

Televised trailers featured the songs "Ashes" by English band Embrace, "All These Things That I've Done" by the Killers, "How to Save a Life" by the Fray, and "In This Life" by Chantal Kreviazuk.

The score was written by Rolfe Kent and orchestrated by Tony Blondal.

== Reception ==
=== Box office ===
In the United States and Canada, Reign Over Me grossed $19.7 million, with $2.6 million in other territories, for a worldwide total of $22.2 million, against a budget of $20 million. It opened at No. 8, its first of two consecutive weeks in the Top 10 at the domestic box office.

=== Critical response ===
On the review aggregator website Rotten Tomatoes, 64% of 151 critics' reviews are positive, with an average rating of 6.3/10. The website's consensus reads: "Reign Over Me is a charming, affecting tale of friendship and loss, with solid performances from Adam Sandler as a broken, grief-stricken man and Don Cheadle as his old friend and savior." Metacritic, which uses a weighted average, assigned the film a score of 61 out of 100, based on 33 critics, indicating "generally favorable" reviews.

Lisa Schwarzbaum at Entertainment Weekly gave Reign Over Me a B− rating, calling the film "a strange, black-and-blue therapeutic drama equally mottled with likable good intentions and agitating clumsiness." She shared her own discomfort with seeing the September 11 attacks casually included as a plot device in a fictional dramedy, though praised the film's performances and story. A. O. Scott, writing for The New York Times, found the film "maddeningly uneven… so many moments of grace followed by so many stumbles and fumbles".

The video gaming blog Kotaku praised Reign Over Me's inclusion of the video game Shadow of the Colossus, stating that it "must be one of the first Hollywood films, if not the first, to deal with games thematically and intelligently". In an interview with Vogue Magazine in 2017, when a reporter asked British actress Daisy Ridley which film makes her cry the most, her response was Reign Over Me.

== See also ==
- List of cultural references to the September 11 attacks
