= Cold Turkey (2013 film) =

American film

- Directed by: Will Slocombe
- Written by: Will Slocombe
- Produced by: Graham Ballou; David Mandel
- Starring: Peter Bogdanovich; Ashton Holmes; Alicia Witt; Sonya Walger; Wilson Bethel; Cheryl Hines
- Cinematography: Lucas Lee Graham
- Edited by: Lauren Connelly
- Music by: William C. White
- Production companies: Midway Films; Burn Later Prods.
- Distributed by: FilmBuff
- Release date: November 15, 2013
- Running time: 82 minutes 83 minutes 84 minutes
- Country: United States
- Language: English

Cold Turkey (also titled Pasadena) is a 2013 American comedy-drama film written and directed by Will Slocombe and starring Peter Bogdanovich, Ashton Holmes, Alicia Witt, Sonya Walger, Wilson Bethel and Cheryl Hines.

== Cast ==
- Peter Bogdanovich
- Sonya Walger
- Cheryl Hines
- Alicia Witt
- Ashton Holmes
- Wilson Bethel
- Amy Ferguson
- Victoria Tennant
- Nicolas Coster
- Jet Jurgensmeyer
- Ross Partridge
- Azar Beaudoin
- Cory Dewitt

== Reception ==
The film has a 20% rating on Rotten Tomatoes. Veronika Ferdman of Slant Magazine awarded the film one and a half stars out of four. Bill Goodykoontz of The Arizona Republic awarded the film two and a half stars. Noel Murray of The Dissolve awarded the film two stars out of five.

David Edelstein of Vulture.com gave the film a positive review, calling it "a simmering piece of holiday dystopia with a good, scorching boil-over."
