= The Reef (novel) =

1912 novel by Edith Wharton

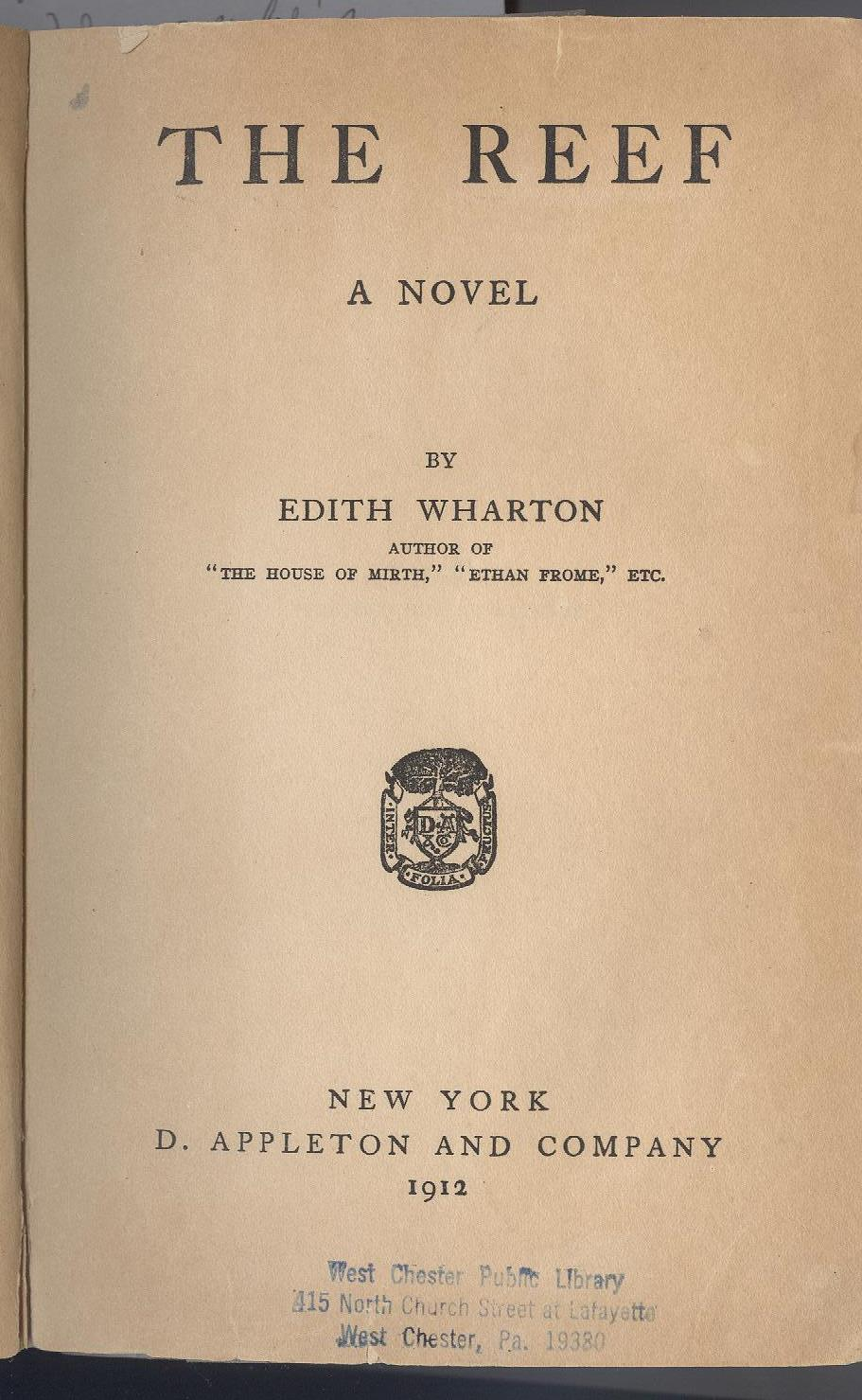
- 1912 first edition title page
- Author: Edith Wharton
- Language: English
- Publisher: D. Appleton & Company
- Publication date: September 16, 1912
- Publication place: United States

The Reef is a 1912 novel by American writer Edith Wharton. It was published by D. Appleton & Company. It concerns a romance between a widow and her former lover. The novel takes place in Paris and rural France in the early 20th century, but primarily features American characters. While writing the novel, Edith Wharton visited England, Sicily, and Germany, among other locations. In a letter to Bernard Berenson in November 1912, Wharton expressed regret regarding her novel, calling it a “poor miserable lifeless lump”. She wrote, “Anyhow, remember it’s not me, though I thought it was when I was writing it—& that next time I’m going to do something worthwhile!!”

== Synopsis ==
George Darrow, a 38-year-old American diplomat residing in London, has remained in contact with his former love, Anna Leath, who previously married another man. Now widowed, she resumes contact with Darrow. Darrow desires to continue the relationship he had with Anna but remains concerned about her commitment to the relationship.

The novel begins with Darrow preparing to join Anna in France when he receives a telegram ordering him to wait "til thirtieth" because of an "unexpected obstacle" - one of many such delays Anna has ordered. Deeply humiliated and disappointed, Darrow boards the boat regardless and runs into the young Sophy Viner, a woman he had previously encountered but never gotten to know thoroughly. Sophy, although down on her luck, is an ambitious aspiring actress determined to start a new life in France. Enthralled, Darrow convinces her to spend a few days with him so he can show her around Paris. During their time spent together, the two enter into a romantic affair.

Months later, Darrow meets Anna at her French country chateau at Givré. They speak of their future and of Anna's stepson Owen, who wishes to marry a woman of whom his grandmother, Dowager Marquise de Chantelle, does not approve. Additionally, Darrow informs Anna of his plans for their future together: he hopes to move to South America together for his job. It is revealed that Anna has hired a governess for her young daughter, Effie. That governess is Sophy Viner.

Sophy, embarrassed by the situation, begs Darrow not to say anything that might jeopardize her employment. Darrow tries to convince Sophy not to marry Owen, and Sophy accuses him of jealousy. Darrow admits to Anna that he knew Sophy already. Anna quizzes him about Sophy, out of concern for Owen, who is engaged to Sophy. Darrow agrees with the Marquise that the union would not be wise.

The Dowager Marquise requests that an old family friend, Adelaide Painter, talk some sense into the family. However, when Adelaide supports the union, the Marquise concedes to her grandson. The road is clear for Owen and Sophy to marry, which also frees the path for Darrow and Anna.

Sophy unexpectedly breaks off the engagement to Owen. Owen becomes suspicious of Darrow's influence over Sophy. The main characters then attempt to figure out what happened by interrogating each other. This part of the novel shows an increase in dialogue, and an unusually high rate of dialogue for Wharton's novels.

Sophy eventually reveals to Darrow that she has loved him since Paris. The affair between Darrow and Sophy is revealed to Anna. Darrow attempts to explain that the affair was short lived, but Anna cannot live with the knowledge and becomes convinced that the revelation destroyed any potential for a future relationship.

Despite the fact that Anna believes herself to be well matched with Darrow, she is unable to overcome her jealousy of Sophy. She becomes obsessed with imagining the time they spent together.

Owen leaves for Spain. Sophy is reemployed by Mrs. Murrett, her previous employer, and moves to India. Anna encounters Sophy's large, slovenly sister and her lover, which gives Anna the perspective that Sophy is not as much of a fallen woman as she originally thought. Anna attempts to convince herself that she should not marry Darrow, but cannot bring herself to do it.

== Characters ==
George Darrow: 38-year-old American diplomat who is living in London at the beginning of the novel. He becomes engaged to Anna Leath.

Anna Leath: 36-year-old American widow living in Givré, which is in rural France. She becomes engaged to George Darrow.

Sophy Viner: 28-year-old American woman who aspires to become an actress. She is engaged to Owen Leath.

Owen Leath: Anna's stepson, age 29. He is engaged to Sophy Viner.

Effie Leath: Anna's daughter, age 9

Dowager Marquise de Chantelle: Anna's mother in law, age 62

Adelaide Painter: American friend of the family and of the Marquise

Mrs. Murrett: Sophy's previous employer

Fraser Leath: Anna's deceased husband

Jimmy Brance: Servant in Murrett household, associate of Sophy's sister

== Critical receptions and reviews ==
In a review published in the New York Sun on November 23, 1912, the book was described as “a bitter, disheartening, sordid story and we could wish that Mrs. Wharton would look on brighter and nobler aspects of life." Similarly, in his review, H.I. Brock called the book “rather conspicuously a failure”.

Many critics assert that Wharton uses The Reef to work on possible problems troubling her at the time, specifically her first experience of passionate love that involved Morton Fullerton. While Wharton was writing The Reef she was additionally learning about her husband’s affairs after years of a sexless marriage. It is commonly believed that Anna and Sophy represent Wharton before and after her encounter with Fullerton, with Anna representing the sexually repressed woman that Wharton once feared she would remain. Sophy has been described as "Wharton's natural alter ego."

== Adaptations ==
The novel was adapted into a film The Reef (also known as Passion's Way) in 1999 starring Sela Ward, Timothy Dalton and Alicia Witt.
