= Josh Charles =

American actor (born 1971)

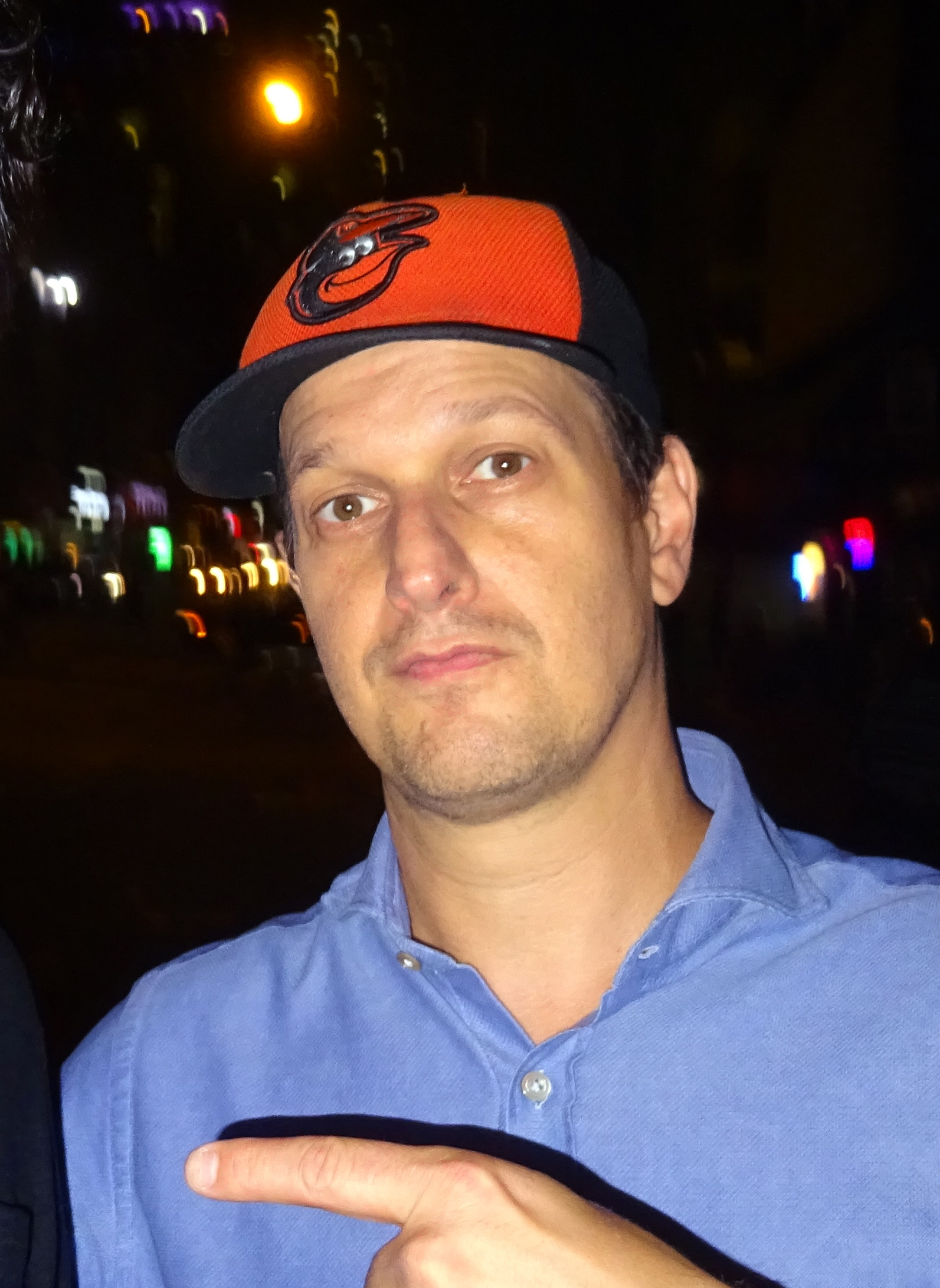
- Born: Joshua Aaron Charles; September 15, 1971 (age 55); Baltimore, Maryland, U.S.
- Occupation: Actor
- Years active: 1988–present
- Spouse: Sophie Flack (m. 2013)
- Children: 2

Joshua Aaron Charles (born September 15, 1971) is an American film, television, and theater actor best known for playing Will Gardner on The Good Wife, a role which earned him two Primetime Emmy Award nominations. He also appeared in Sports Night, Dead Poets Society and Don't Tell Mom the Babysitter's Dead.

== Early life ==
Joshua Aaron Charles was born on September 15, 1971 to Allan Charles, an advertising executive, and Laura Peyton. He is Jewish on his father's side and identifies as Jewish himself. He began his career performing comedy at the age of nine. As a teenager, he spent several summers at Stagedoor Manor Performing Arts Center in New York. He attended the Baltimore School for the Arts, where he was a classmate of Jada Pinkett and Tupac Shakur.

== Career ==
=== Film ===
Charles's film debut was in John Waters's Hairspray in 1988. The following year, he starred alongside Robin Williams and Ethan Hawke in Dead Poets Society. He had also appeared in Don't Tell Mom the Babysitter's Dead, Threesome, Pie in the Sky, Muppets from Space, S.W.A.T, Four Brothers, After.Life, Crossing the Bridge, and Brief Interviews with Hideous Men.

=== Television ===
Charles played sports anchor Dan Rydell in Aaron Sorkin's Sports Night (1998–2000), for which he was nominated for the Screen Actors Guild Award. In 2008, Charles appeared in season one of HBO's In Treatment. He played a recurring role in The Good Wife, for which he was nominated for an Emmy Award twice; once in 2011 and another in 2014.

In 2011, Charles narrated the debut episode for NFL Network's A Football Life based on New England Patriots head coach Bill Belichick. In 2022, he starred in the HBO limited series We Own This City.

In May 2025, Charles joined the cast of the American remake of the British series Doc Martin called Best Medicine.

=== Theatre ===
Charles headlined a production of Jonathan Marc Sherman's Confrontation in 1986. In 2004, he appeared in the revival of Neil LaBute's The Distance from Here which received a Drama Desk Award for Best Ensemble Cast. In January 2006, he appeared in Richard Greenberg's The Well-Appointed Room at the Steppenwolf Theatre Company, Chicago and Caryl Churchill's A Number at the American Conservatory Theater, San Francisco. In 2007, he appeared in Adam Bock's The Receptionist at the Manhattan Theatre Club, New York City.

Charles appeared in the off-Broadway production of Annie Baker's The Antipodes at the Signature Theatre in 2017. He made his Broadway debut in Straight White Men by Young Jean Lee at the Hayes Theater in 2018.

=== Others ===
Charles appeared in Taylor Swift's music video for "Fortnight" in 2024, alongside his Dead Poets Society co-star Ethan Hawke.

== Personal life ==
In September 2013, Charles married ballet dancer and author Sophie Flack. The couple lives in New York City. On December 9, 2014, Flack gave birth to the couple's first child, a son. On August 23, 2018, Charles revealed on his Instagram that Flack gave birth to their second child, a daughter.

Charles supports the Baltimore Ravens and Baltimore Orioles.

=== Politics ===
In 2011, Charles appeared in a Human Rights Campaign video in support of same-sex marriage. He also supported the 2012 Maryland same-sex marriage referendum.

Charles supported Hillary Clinton's presidential campaign in 2016. In 1999, Clinton's campaign for the U.S. Senate had requested a copy of a Sports Night episode in which Charles's character Dan Rydell talks about his admiration for Clinton and recounts attending a fundraiser for her off-screen.

In August 2014, Charles was amongst the Hollywood signatories for an open letter condemning Hamas attacks on Israel during the 2014 Gaza War. In October 2023, he signed an open letter calling on President Joe Biden to work toward the release of all Israeli hostages following the October 7 attacks.

== Filmography ==
=== Film ===
Year	Title	Role	Notes
1988	Hairspray	Iggy	
1989	Dead Poets Society	Knox Overstreet	
1991	Don't Tell Mom the Babysitter's Dead	Bryan	
1992	Crossing the Bridge	Mort Golden	
1994	Threesome	Eddy	
1995	Things to Do in Denver When You're Dead	Bruce	uncredited
1995	Coldblooded	Randy	
1996	The Grave	Tyn	
1996	Crossworlds	Joe Talbot	
1996	Pie in the Sky	Charlie Dunlap	
1997	Cyclops, Baby	Brush Brody	
1997	Little City	Adam	
1999	Muppets from Space	Agent Barker	
2000	Meeting Daddy	Peter Silverblatt	
2003	S.W.A.T.	T. J. McCabe	
2004	Seeing Other People	Lou	
2005	Four Brothers	Detective Fowler	
2006	The Darwin Awards	Paramedic	
2006	The Ex	Forrest Mead	
2009	After.Life	Tom Peterson	
2009	Brief Interviews with Hideous Men	Subject No. 2	
2014	Bird People	Gary Newman	
2014	Adult Beginners	Phil	
2015	I Smile Back	Bruce Brooks	
2015	Freeheld	Bryan Kelder	
2016	Whiskey Tango Foxtrot	Chris	
2016	Norman	Arthur Taub	
2016	The Drowning	Tom Seymour	
2018	Amateur	Coach Gaines	
2019	Framing John DeLorean	Bill Collins	
2023	Memory	Isaac	
2024	Mothers' Instinct	Damian Jennings	

=== Television ===
Year	Title	Role	Notes
1990	Murder in Mississippi	Andrew Goodman	Television film
1993	Cooperstown	Jody	Television film
1996	Norma Jean & Marilyn	Eddie Jordan	Television film
1997	The Underworld	Ehrlich	Television film
1998–2000	Sports Night	Dan Rydell	45 episodes
2002	Our America	Dave Isay	Television film
2005	Stella	Jeremy	Episode: "Meeting Girls"
2007	Six Degrees	Ray Jones	4 episodes
2008	In Treatment	Jake	8 episodes
2008	Law & Order: Special Victims Unit	Sean Kelley	Episode: "Confession"
2009–2016	The Good Wife	Will Gardner	107 episodes, also director (3 episodes)
2014–2016	Inside Amy Schumer	Various	4 episodes
2015	Masters of Sex	Dan Logan	10 episodes
2015	Wet Hot American Summer: First Day of Camp	Blake	6 episodes
2016–2017	Unbreakable Kimmy Schmidt	Duke Snyder	5 episodes
2016–2019	Drunk History	Various	3 episodes
2017	Wet Hot American Summer: Ten Years Later	Blake	6 episodes
2017	Law & Order True Crime	Dr. Jerome Oziel	7 episodes
2017	Last Week Tonight with John Oliver	Forensic Scientist	Episode: "Forensic Science"
2019	The Loudest Voice	Casey Close	3 episodes
2020	Away	Matt Logan	10 episodes
2021	Law & Order: Organized Crime	Vince Baldi	Episode: "Forget it, Jake; It's Chinatown"
2022	We Own This City	Daniel Hersl	Miniseries, main cast
2023	The Power	Daniel Dandon	Recurring role
2024	The Veil	Max Peterson	4 episodes
2025	The Handmaid's Tale	Commander Wharton	4 episodes
2025	The American Revolution	Joseph Warren / David Ramsay (voice)	5 episodes
2026	Best Medicine	Dr. Martin Best	Main role

=== Music videos ===
Year	Title	Artist	Ref.
2024	"Fortnight"	Taylor Swift ft. Post Malone	

== Awards and nominations ==
Year	Association	Category	Nominated work	Result
2000	Screen Actors Guild Awards	Outstanding Performance by an Ensemble in a Comedy Series	Sports Night	Nominated
2000	Viewers for Quality Television	Best Actor in a Quality Comedy Series	Sports Night	Nominated
2010	Satellite Awards	Best Actor – Television Series Drama	The Good Wife	Nominated
2010	Screen Actors Guild Awards	Outstanding Performance by an Ensemble in a Drama Series	The Good Wife	Nominated
2011	Primetime Emmy Awards	Outstanding Supporting Actor in a Drama Series	The Good Wife	Nominated
2011	Screen Actors Guild Awards	Outstanding Performance by an Ensemble in a Drama Series	The Good Wife	Nominated
2012	Monte-Carlo Television Festival	Outstanding Actor in a Drama Series	The Good Wife	Nominated
2012	Screen Actors Guild Awards	Outstanding Performance by an Ensemble in a Drama Series	The Good Wife	Nominated
2014	Critics' Choice Television Awards	Best Supporting Actor in a Drama Series	The Good Wife	Nominated
2014	Golden Globe Awards	Best Supporting Actor – Series, Miniseries or Television Film	The Good Wife	Nominated
2014	People's Choice Awards	Favorite Dramatic Television Actor	The Good Wife	Won
2014	Primetime Emmy Awards	Outstanding Supporting Actor in a Drama Series	The Good Wife	Nominated
2015	Critics' Choice Television Awards	Best Guest Performer in a Comedy Series	Inside Amy Schumer	Nominated
