= Fun (film) =

- Directed by: Rafal Zielinski
- Written by: James Bosley
- Based on: Fun by James Bosley
- Produced by: James R. Zatolokin; Rafal Zielinski
- Starring: Alicia Witt; Renée Humphrey; William R. Moses; Leslie Hope
- Cinematography: Jens Sturup
- Edited by: Monika Lightstone
- Music by: Rana Joy Glickman
- Distributed by: David Whitten|Greycat Films; Neo Modern Entertainment
- Release date: April 14, 1995
- Running time: 105 minutes
- Country: Canada
- Language: English

Fun is a 1994 Canadian independent drama film starring Alicia Witt and Renée Humphrey, and directed by Rafal Zielinski. The film centers on the murder of an elderly woman by two mentally unstable girls. Both Witt and Humphrey won a Special Jury Recognition award at the 1994 Sundance Film Festival.

The film is based on a play by James Bosley, which was in turn based on an actual murder that was committed in Auburn, California in 1983 by 14-year-old Shirley Wolf and 15-year-old Cindy Collier. The film's title is derived from a diary entry by Wolf, which read: "Today, Cindy and I ran away and killed an old lady. It was lots of fun."

The film is told in flashbacks detailing the girls' relationship (in color), and their time in juvenile detention center (in black and white).

== Plot ==
Bonnie, aged 14, and Hillary, aged 15, meet at a bus stop in Los Angeles, California, and begin a friendship. They stroll around their city, chuck rocks onto a highway from an overpass bridge, run rampant in shopping malls, and play video games. In a stream of careless chatter, Hillary reveals to Bonnie that her father is in prison for raping her and Bonnie recounts of how joking around with her brother turned into intercourse, and that she has kept this to herself.

Their day escalates into an eruption of violence and rage when they brutally stab an elderly woman to death. They then run to a gas station and attempt to wash off the blood from their clothes. After their arrest, they claim that the murder was purely just for "fun". The story moves from the juvenile detention center where the girls are kept, to the girls on the day of the killing.

== Cast ==
- Renée Humphrey as Hillary
- Alicia Witt as Bonnie
- William R. Moses as John
- Leslie Hope as Jane
- Ania Suli as Mrs. Farmer

== Critical reception ==
James Berardinelli of ReelViews gave the film a strongly positive review, commending the film’s character development, cinematography, and Witt's performance. He said it succeeds at giving insight into the disturbed "psyches of two memorable characters".

In contrast, Sheila Johnston of The Independent was more mixed; though she felt the film felt too thematically similar to recent films about "the blank generation", such as Heavenly Creatures and Natural Born Killers, she said, "The main reason to see it is the exceptional performances from the two young leads, Alicia Witt as the crazed, hyperactive, almost infantile Bonnie and Renee Humphrey as her brooding, introverted friend."

On review aggregator Rotten Tomatoes, Fun has an approval rating of 82% based on 11 reviews, with an average score of 7.0 out of 10.
