= Renee Humphrey =

American actress (born 1975)

- Born: Renee K. Humphrey; January 27, 1975 (age 51); San Mateo, California, U.S.
- Occupations: Actress, producer, director
- Years active: 1992–present
- Known for: Mallrats; Fun

Renee Humphrey is an American actress who has appeared in both film and television.

== Career ==
Humphrey was born in San Mateo, California and grew up in the Marinwood area of Marin County. She worked extensively as an actress in film and television from 1991 through 2000. Her performance as Hillary in the indie film Fun landed her a special jury prize for acting at the 1994 Sundance Film Festival. She is known to Kevin Smith fans as Trisha "Trish the Dish" Jones in Mallrats (1995) and Jay and Silent Bob Strike Back (2001). In 2005, Titan Motion Picture Group was established and she and her Titan MPG producing partners made the film Family. (U.S. broadcast rights were purchased by Lifetime Movie Network.)

== Filmography ==
=== Film ===
| Year | Title | Role | Notes |
|---|---|---|---|
| 1993 | Jailbait | Kyle Bradley | Direct-to-video |
| 1994 | Fun | Hillary | |
| 1994 | The Privilege Cage | Anna | Short film |
| 1995 | The Cure | Angle | |
| 1995 | French Kiss | Lilly | |
| 1995 | Devil in a Blue Dress | Barbara | |
| 1995 | Mallrats | Tricia Jones | |
| 1996 | Cadillac Ranch | Mary Katherine Crowley | |
| 1996 | Drawing Flies | Meg | |
| 1997 | Lover Girl | Annie / 'Teddy' | |
| 1999 | The Sex Monster | Didi | |
| 2000 | Chicks, Man | Stephanie | |
| 2000 | Urban Mythology | Laura Saunders | |
| 2001 | Hard Luck | Sheryl Billings | |
| 2001 | Jay and Silent Bob Strike Back | Tricia Jones | |
| 2001 | Perfect Fit | Amanda | |
| 2006 | Family | Jean | also producer and casting director |
| 2007 | Some of an Equation | | |

=== Television ===
| Year | Title | Role | Notes |
|---|---|---|---|
| 1991 | Saved by the Bell | Melissa (Uncredited) | Episode: "Palm Springs Weekend" |
| 1992 | Tequila and Bonetti | Runaway / Beach Girl | Episode: "Teach Your Children" |
| 1992-1993 | Reasonable Doubts | Martha Novak | Guest role; 2 episodes |
| 1993 | The Wonder Years | Hayley Green | Episode: "Nose" |
| 1993 | CBS Schoolbreak Special | Erin Chapman | Episode: "Big Boys Don't Cry" |
| 1993 | Empty Nest | Keree | Episode: "Aunt Verne Knows Best" |
| 1993 | In the Heat of the Night | Cassie Green | Episode: "A Baby Called Rocket" |
| 1993 | The Commish | Caroline Wallace | Episode: "Mansion" |
| 1995 | Fighting for My Daughter | Jessie | Television film |
| 1999 | Providence | Dana Maguire | Episode: "All Good Dogs Go to Heaven" |
| 1999 | Diagnosis: Murder | Holly Harris | Episode: "Murder at Midterm" |
| 2018 | You Can't Say No | Waitress | Television film |
