= The Comedy Store (TV series) =

American television series

- Directed by: Mike Binder
- Starring: David Letterman; Jim Carrey; Mike Binder; Bill Burr; Andrew Dice Clay; Whoopi Goldberg; Sandra Bernhard; Bobby Lee; Pauly Shore; Neal Brennan; Jay Leno; Nikki Glaser; Sebastian Maniscalco; Marc Maron; Chris Rock; Iliza Shlesinger; Louis C.K. Joe Rogan; Carl LaBove
- Country of origin: United States
- Original language: English

Production
- Producer: Mike Binder

Original release
- Network: Showtime
- Release: October 4 – November 1, 2020

The Comedy Store is a 2020 documentary miniseries directed, produced and starring Mike Binder about the American comedy club The Comedy Store.

== Critical reception ==
NPR said "This documentary contains plenty of laughs to make it very entertaining. But it also says a lot about fame, about the drive to succeed, and about both competition and friendship. Such topics as sexism and racism are addressed frankly also. In putting this all together, Binder has access to a seemingly endless stack of candid photos taken at the club, and uses them very well. He also folds in some very specific music choices on the soundtrack, ending each episode on one emotional peak or another."

IndieWire wrote "Had “The Comedy Store” been more focused on story and less on free-wheeling chats, it might have accurately captured The Store as Binder and so many other comedians see it. But, as such, what the viewer is continually told was wild and reckless, more often than not, comes off as mild and feckless.

The Hollywood Reporter said "It’s a five-hour commercial for The Comedy Store, but darned if it isn’t funny and entertaining."

== Episodes ==
Each episode is an hour long and breaks down a different time period throughout the existence of the Comedy Store. The director, Mike Binder, goes on a podcast with a different comedian to set the tone and help provide the narrative of each episode.

No.	Title	Directed by	Original release date	U.S. viewers (millions)
1	"Saw You Last Night on the Tonight Show"	Mike Binder	October 4, 2020	N/A
2	"The Comedy Strike"	Mike Binder	October 11, 2020	N/A
3	"The Wild Bunch"	Mike Binder	October 18, 2020	N/A
4	"Joe Rogan Returns"	Mike Binder	October 25, 2020	N/A
5	"The Birth of a Bit"	Mike Binder	November 1, 2020	N/A
