= The Mind of the Married Man =

- Created by: Mike Binder
- Starring: Mike Binder; Sonya Walger; Jake Weber; Ivana Miličević
- Country of origin: United States
- No. of seasons: 2
- No. of episodes: 20

Production
- Running time: 30 minutes
- Production companies: Comedy Arts Studios; 3 Arts Entertainment; Sunlight Productions; HBO Entertainment

Original release
- Network: HBO
- Release: September 23, 2001 – November 17, 2002

The Mind of the Married Man is a television series that ran on HBO for two seasons consisting of twenty episodes between September 2001 and November 2002. The story focused on the challenges of modern-day married life from a male perspective.

The theme song was the title song of the musical I Love My Wife (1977), written by Cy Coleman and Michael Stewart.

== Cast ==
- Mike Binder as Micky Barnes
- Sonya Walger as Donna Barnes
- Ivana Miličević as Missy
- Jake Weber as Jake Berman
- M. Emmet Walsh as Randall Evans
- Taylor Nichols as Doug Nelson
- Doug Williams as Kevin
- Bobby Slayton as Slayton
- Brigitte Bako as Bianca
- Kate Walsh as Carol Nelson

== Reception ==
The Mind Of The Married Man received mixed-to-negative reviews. Ken Tucker of Entertainment Weekly rated it the worst show on television in 2002, calling it "Mike Binder's rancid little barf-com" and described it as more offensive than similar shows on other non-subscription networks "because it could be more explicit in its moronic sexism". Phil Gallo in Variety described it as an "overblown take on the sexual predilections and peccadilloes of a trio of ribald Chicago newspaper columnists" and that while it aspired to be "a male Sex and the City, it does not have any of that show's strengths — character, plot, reality." In a marginally more positive review, Julie Salamon of The New York Times said Married Man wants to copy Sex and the City, but it isn't nearly as deft or surprising and "adheres to many sitcom clichés", yet is "cleverly produced and compelling in part because its characters are so annoying (and so close to certain truths). Women especially will enjoy feeling superior to these sad souls with their pathetic dreams."

HBO cancelled the show after 20 episodes over two seasons. According to Carolyn Strauss, who was the executive vice president of program development for HBO at the time, "Mind turned out to be a divisive show within households [...] Women wouldn't watch it, so husbands didn't watch it with their wives, and boyfriends didn't with their girlfriends."

In a 2011 retrospective review, Metro called it "outdated" and that it "looked as though it could have been straight out of the early 1990s. Everything from the boxy jackets to the less-than-perfect visual quality of the filming looked oddly old-fashioned." The review added, "Although it had its funny moments, the writing wasn't snappy enough to compensate for all of this."

== Episodes ==
=== Season 1 (2001) ===
No.	Title	Directed by	Written by	Original release date	US viewers (millions)
1	"The Mind of the Married Man"	Mike Binder	Mike Binder	September 23, 2001	3.05
Micky, Doug, and Jake are three married co-workers who work at a Chicago newspaper. The three discuss Micky's options as to how he should confront his wife, who had browsed his laptop computer and discovered pornographic pictures of college women. Jake suggests that Micky call Monica (a hooker who poses as Jake's computer consultant) and schedule a visit. Meanwhile, Micky needs a personal assistant, and after interviewing the candidates, he hires a woman whom he finds to be irresistibly attractive.
2	"The Secret of the Universe"	Roger Nygard	Mike Binder	September 30, 2001	2.62
Admonished by Micky for being "cold" to Missy, Donna arrives at his office to ask her out to lunch - a decision that does not sit well with her husband. Single co-worker Kevin boasts about the plethora of "crazy" women around town; Jake gets up-close-and-personal with the paper's new entertainment reporter Ilene; and Doug shares his "secret of the universe" with Micky, offering to loan Micky and Donna some self-help "marriage tapes" that he and his wife Carol watch to keep their relationship strong.
3	"The God of Marriage"	Danny Leiner	Mike Binder	October 7, 2001	N/A
Micky seems peeved when Donna doesn't "get" a joke he heard at the bar about oral sex and The Three Stooges - but is it just a cover for what is really upsetting him? Jake ends his office affair with Ilene, and Doug seeks to curtail his wife Carol's excessive spending. With Micky continuing to fantasize about Missy, Jake decides the best thing for his friend is a visit to the Tokyo massage parlor for a full-body rubdown - complete with an optional "happy ending."
4	"Time on the Lake"	Danny Leiner	Mike Binder	October 14, 2001	N/A
While Micky and Donna search for a hobby, the guys enlist Jake to find out whether a man is tired of his beautiful wife.
5	"Anywhere, Anytime"	Nancy Savoca	Gay Walch	October 21, 2001	1.96
Donna gives Micky an "electronic tether" in the form of a pager. Meanwhile, Jake's jilted girlfriend Ilene threatens to tell his wife about his extramarital indiscretion.
6	"Wonderful News"	Bruce Paltrow	Ritch Shydner	October 28, 2001	N/A
Could Donna be pregnant? Faced with the possibility, Micky struggles to come to grips with his feelings. Doug's visiting mother-in-law affects his sex life.
7	"Just Thinking of You"	Bob Saget	Mike Binder	November 4, 2001	N/A
Micky and Donna embark on a kitchen/marriage remodel. Jake's call girl retires, and work forces Doug to skip Carol's birthday celebration.
8	"When We Were Nice"	Danny Leiner	Katayoun A. Marciano	November 11, 2001	N/A
Micky accuses Donna of having an affair with their contractor. Jake suggests an exotic cure for Doug's back problem.
9	"Lay Down Dancing"	Danny Leiner	Mike Binder	November 18, 2001	N/A
Micky crosses the line with his masseuse. Jake crosses a line with Missy.
10	"Cold Splash of Truth"	Mike Binder	Mike Binder	November 25, 2001	N/A
Micky considers telling Donna about his extramarital excursion. Despite Doug's wishes, Carol returns to her career.

=== Season 2 (2002) ===
No.	Title	Directed by	Written by	Original release date	US viewers (millions)
11	"Peter Pan"	Roger Nygard	Mike Binder	September 15, 2002	3.92
Micky, racked with guilt over his extramarital excursion, is dead set on making things right as the "New Micky." Meanwhile, Donna is gung-ho about Bobby attending a posh pre-school, in the process scheduling a play-date for a less-than-enthused Micky.
12	"The Cream of the Crop"	Bruce Paltrow	Mike Binder	September 22, 2002	N/A
Micky has a problem programming his TiVo, and wonders if it's a metaphor for his relationship with his mind. Meanwhile, Donna considers her role as a parent, and Jake leads Micky to a startling discovery about pre-school.
13	"The Plan"	Danny Leiner	Mike Binder	September 29, 2002	2.82
During a night out at the movies, Donna is inspired to rethink her career, causing her and Micky to discuss her shift from "full-time writer" to "full-time mother." Meanwhile, Jake continues his dogged pursuit of Missy, and Randall teaches the youngsters a thing or two about cards.
14	"Full-Time Mom"	Roger Nygard	Mike Binder	October 6, 2002	3.00
Donna decides the family needs to start attending church; Jake is nearly caught with Missy; and Micky reacquaints himself with a face from the past.
15	"20/20"	Neal Israel	Bruce Kirschbaum	October 13, 2002	2.98
The anniversary party of Doug's parents causes everyone to evaluate their relationships with their own parents; Doug buys Carol a mysterious brand of coffee; and Micky has an eye exam with a beautiful optometrist.
16	"The Perfect Babysitter"	Danny Leiner	Tom Leopold	October 20, 2002	3.09
Micky reluctantly agrees to begin therapy; the Nelsons debate whether to buy a new car or remodel their kitchen; and Jake continues his pursuit of Missy.
17	"The Corvette"	Neal Israel	Ritch Shydner and Leah Krinsky Atkins	October 27, 2002	2.90
Micky thinks a new baby will remedy their marital problems, but Donna has her own solution; against Carol's wishes, Doug buys a Corvette; and Bianca (Brigitte Bako) suspects something between Jake and Missy.
18	"The Pony Ride"	Stephen Herek	Mike Binder	November 3, 2002	N/A
Micky plans a surprise party for Randall to get back in his good graces, but finds himself distracted by a new dilemma at home.
19	"A Hard Pill to Swallow"	Roger Nygard	Mike Binder	November 10, 2002	3.17
Micky starts to see progress in therapy, but finds his relationship with Donna tested; Jake finally runs out of alibis with Bianca; and Carol decides to trade in Doug's Corvette.
20	"Never Stop"	Mike Binder	Kevin Garnett & Lee Eisenberg	November 17, 2002	3.64
Micky suggests couple's therapy in order to draw Donna back into the relationship; after a few nights on Slayton's couch, Jake tries to talk his way back into Bianca's life.
