= Crossing the Bridge =

1992 film by Mike Binder

- Theatrical release poster
- Directed by: Mike Binder
- Written by: Mike Binder
- Produced by: Jeffrey Silver; Robert Newmyer
- Starring: Jason Gedrick; Josh Charles; Stephen Baldwin; Jeffrey Tambor
- Cinematography: Tom Sigel
- Edited by: Adam Weiss
- Music by: Peter Himmelman
- Production company: Touchstone Pictures
- Distributed by: Buena Vista Pictures Distribution
- Release date: September 11, 1992
- Running time: 103 minutes
- Country: United States
- Language: English
- Budget: $6 million
- Box office: $479,676

Crossing the Bridge is a 1992 American drama film starring Josh Charles, Stephen Baldwin and Jason Gedrick.

Characters Mort Golden (Josh Charles), Tim Reese (Jason Gedrick) and Danny Morgan (Stephen Baldwin) are friends who embark on a dangerous drug-smuggling venture.

The film was written and directed by Mike Binder and loosely based on Binders' friends during the late 1970s in the Detroit/Birmingham, MI area.

Much of the plot concerns the three friends driving into Canada as couriers in a drug deal. When returning to the United States at the Ambassador Bridge crossing between Windsor, Ontario and Detroit, the protagonists face possible capture by authorities.

== Cast ==
- Jason Gedrick as Tim Reese
- Josh Charles as Mort Golden
- Stephen Baldwin as Danny Morgan
- Jeffrey Tambor as Uncle Alby
- David Schwimmer as John Anderson
- Cheryl Pollak as Carol Brockton
- Richard Edson as Mitchell
- Abraham Benrubi as Rinny
- Ken Jenkins as Lou Golden
- Rita Taggart as Kate Golden

== Soundtrack ==
- "Smoke on the Water" by Peter Himmelman
- "I'd Love to Change the World" by Ten Years After
- "Fortunate Son" by Creedence Clearwater Revival
- "These Days" by Jackson Browne
- "Love Song" by Elton John
- "Bad Company" by Bad Company
- "Locomotive Breath" by Ian Anderson
- "The Shadow of Your Smile" by Tony Bennett
- "Wild Thing" by Jimi Hendrix
- "From the Beginning" by Emerson, Lake & Palmer
- "Til It Shines" by Bob Seger
- "Impermanent Things" by Peter Himmelman
