= Indian Summer (1993 film) =

1993 film by Mike Binder

- Theatrical release poster
- Directed by: Mike Binder
- Written by: Mike Binder
- Produced by: Jim Kouf; Lynn Kouf; Robert F. Newmyer; Jeffrey Silver
- Starring: Alan Arkin; Matt Craven; Diane Lane; Bill Paxton; Elizabeth Perkins; Kevin Pollak; Vincent Spano; Julie Warner; Kimberly Williams
- Cinematography: Newton Thomas Sigel
- Edited by: Adam Weiss
- Music by: Miles Goodman
- Production companies: Touchstone Pictures; Outlaw Productions
- Distributed by: Buena Vista Pictures Distribution
- Release date: April 23, 1993
- Running time: 98 minutes
- Country: United States
- Language: English
- Budget: $9 million
- Box office: $14.9 million

Indian Summer is a 1993 American comedy drama film written and directed by Mike Binder. The film was filmed at Camp Tamakwa, a summer camp in Algonquin Provincial Park in Ontario, Canada, which Binder had attended for ten summers as a child camper. Indian Summer features an ensemble cast, including Binder's childhood friend, film director Sam Raimi, who has a supporting role in it.

== Plot ==
"Unca" Lou Handler, the beloved owner and director of Camp Tamakwa, invites thirty former campers from the camp's "golden years" two decades prior back to the camp to announce his retirement. Seven friends who attended during the summer of 1972, all now adults, respond to the invitation and return for a one-week reunion. Once there, the group comes to feel nostalgic memories of their youth, and unresolved feelings for each other begin to surface.

The invitees include clothing designer Matt Berman, his cousin and business partner Brad Berman, Matt's wife Kelly, Kelly's friend and Matt's ex-girlfriend Jennifer Martin, art gallery employee Jack Belston, recently widowed Beth Warden, and carefree bachelor Jamie Ross, who brings his much younger girlfriend, 21-year-old Gwen Daugherty.

While willing to participate in the camp reunion, Brad finds the place smaller and dingier than he remembers, and he can't wait to get back to managing his business. Matt feels trapped being in business with Brad, despite their success, because he wants to do other things with his life.

Uncertain about his relationship with Kelly, Matt expresses renewed romantic feelings for Jennifer. Worldly but still single and occasionally lonely as she approaches middle age, Jennifer is tempted to reciprocate. Lou has other ideas, though, and he nips their tryst in the bud. Kelly confronts Matt about her concern that he is becoming distant, after which they work to repair their relationship.

Beth is working through the trauma of losing her husband Rick to a tragic accident one year ago. Jack was Rick's best friend, and regrets not being able to attend his funeral. Although initially tentative in their interactions, Beth and Jack eventually begin a relationship with each other during the reunion.

Jamie is happy being single, with no intentions of starting a family anytime soon. Gwen wants to start a family, and increasingly resents and eventually stands up to Jamie's dismissal and objectification of her.

Having been kicked out of camp as a child and sent home by Unca Lou, Jack nevertheless returns to make amends for what he did – burying Lou's 1946 Michigan State boxing trophy in retaliation for an act of racial prejudice committed by Lou, very much inconsistent with the values taught at camp. Lou eventually acknowledges this and expresses regret over his actions.

Camp traditions include moose watching, shreks (pranks), Lou doing a "dirty dog" (catching campers sneaking out of their cabins at night), the morning wakeup bell, taking what recreational opportunities Wakonda (the Indian god of weather) provides, boxing as both athletic discipline and means of settling arguments, and Lou bestowing the same "super-secret Indian name" (Thundering Cloud) on young campers having trouble socially adjusting to the camp environment.

Lou's primary reason for retiring is his inability to connect with a new generation of kids more interested in boomboxes and headphones than in the great outdoors. Beth and Jack decide they are up to the task, and they want to continue running the camp. Lou gives them his blessing, and they go on to welcome the next class of Tamakwa campers.

== Cast ==
- Alan Arkin as Lou "Unca" Handler
- Matt Craven as Jamie Ross
  - Brad Deutch as Young Jamie
- Diane Lane as:
  - Beth Warden
    - Rebecca Rumsey as Young Beth
  - Claire Everett In A Flashback
- Bill Paxton as Jack Belston
  - Noah Plener as Young Jack
- Elizabeth Perkins as Jennifer Morton
  - Emily Creed as Young Jennifer
- Kevin Pollak as Brad Berman
  - Jeremy Linson as Young Brad
- Sam Raimi as Rick "Stick" Coder
  - Gabriel Gunsberg as Young Rick
- Vincent Spano as Matthew Berman
  - Brian La Pointe as Young Matthew
- Julie Warner as Kelly Berman
  - Heidi Marshall as Young Kelly
- Kimberly Williams as Gwen Daugherty

== Reception ==
The film's reviews were mixed. It holds a 60% "fresh" rating on Rotten Tomatoes based on 20 reviews. Metacritic, which uses a weighted average, assigned the film a score of 51 out of 100, based on 18 critics, indicating "mixed or average" reviews.
