= List of accolades received by Lone Star =

This is a list of awards and nominations received by Lone Star. The film received one Academy Award nomination for Best Screenplay for writer and director John Sayles. The film also won the Belgian Grand Prix and the awards for Best Director and Best Screenplay from the Society of Texas Film Critics Awards. Elizabeth Peña won the Independent Spirit Award for Best Supporting Female and the BRAVO Award for Outstanding Actress in a Feature Film.

== Organizations ==
Organization	Date	Category	Nominee(s)	Result	Ref.
Academy Awards	March 24, 1997	Best Original Screenplay	John Sayles	Nominated	
Artios Awards	November 12, 1997	Best Casting for Feature Film, Drama	Avy Kaufman	Nominated	
BRAVO Awards	December 14, 1996	Outstanding Actress in a Feature Film	Elizabeth Peña	Won	
BRAVO Awards	December 14, 1996	Outstanding Actor in a Feature Film	Tony Plana	Nominated	
BRAVO Awards	December 14, 1996	Special Achievement Award Outstanding Feature Film		Won	
BAFTA Awards	April 29, 1997	Best Original Screenplay	John Sayles	Nominated	
Golden Globe Awards	January 19, 1997	Best Screenplay	John Sayles	Nominated	
Independent Spirit Awards	March 22, 1997	Best Male Lead	Chris Cooper	Nominated	
Independent Spirit Awards	March 22, 1997	Best Supporting Female	Elizabeth Peña	Won	
Independent Spirit Awards	March 22, 1997	Best Screenplay	John Sayles	Nominated	
Independent Spirit Awards	March 22, 1997	Best Feature	R. Paul Miller, Maggie Renzi	Nominated	
National Board of Review Awards	December 9, 1996	Special Recognition for Excellence in Filmmaking		Won	
Satellite Awards	January 15, 1997	Best Original Screenplay	John Sayles	Won (Note: Tied with Scott Alexander and Larry Karaszewski for The People vs. Larry Flynt)	
Satellite Awards	January 15, 1997	Best Motion Picture, Drama	R. Paul Miller, Maggie Renzi	Nominated	

== Guilds ==
Organization	Date	Category	Nominee(s)	Result	Ref.
Writers Guild of America Awards	March 16, 1997	Best Original Screenplay	John Sayles	Nominated	

== Critics groups ==
Organization	Date	Category	Nominee(s)	Result	Ref.
Belgian Film Critics Association	January 12, 1998	Grand Prix		Won	
Chicago Film Critics Association Awards	March 10, 1997	Best Director	John Sayles	Nominated	
Chicago Film Critics Association Awards	March 10, 1997	Best Original Screenplay	John Sayles	Nominated	
Critics' Choice Awards	January 20, 1997	Best Picture		Nominated	
Dallas-Fort Worth Film Critics Association Awards	January 1997	Best Picture		Nominated	
Society of Texas Film Critics Awards	December 19, 1996	Best Film		Nominated	
Society of Texas Film Critics Awards	December 19, 1996	Best Director	John Sayles	Won	
Society of Texas Film Critics Awards	December 19, 1996	Best Screenplay	John Sayles	Won	
Southeastern Film Critics Association Awards	1997	Best Director	John Sayles	Won	
Southeastern Film Critics Association Awards	1997	Best Picture		runner-up	
