= Society of Texas Film Critics Awards =

Annual US film awards ceremony (1994–1998)

The Society of Texas Film Critics Awards were first awarded in 1994, when the Society of Texas Film Critics (STFC) was formed by 21 print, television, radio, and internet film critics working for different media outlets across the state of Texas. Over the course of four years, the size of the organization decreased, and the STFC disbanded in 1998.

Below are the award ceremonies from each of the four years.

== 1st Society of Texas Film Critics Awards (1994) ==
1st Society of Texas Film Critics Awards
- Date: December 17, 1994
- Location: Austin, Texas
- Country: United States
- Presented by: Society of Texas Film Critics

The 1st Society of Texas Film Critics Awards were given by the Society of Texas Film Critics (STFC) on December 17, 1994. The list of winners was announced by STFC founder Michael MacCambridge, then also a film critic for the Austin American-Statesman. The society's first meeting was held in the Representative Boardroom at the Omni Austin Hotel. Pulp Fiction took the top honor and a total of four awards, more than any other film, in this initial awards presentation.

=== Winners ===
- Best Film:
  - Pulp Fiction
- Best Director:
  - Quentin Tarantino – Pulp Fiction
- Best Actor:
  - Samuel L. Jackson – Pulp Fiction
- Best Actress:
  - Linda Fiorentino – The Last Seduction
- Best Supporting Actor:
  - Martin Landau – Ed Wood
- Best Supporting Actress:
  - Dianne Wiest – Bullets Over Broadway
- Best Screenplay:
  - Quentin Tarantino & Roger Avary – Pulp Fiction
- Best Documentary Film:
  - Hoop Dreams
- The Lone Star Award, recognizing the best Texas film of the year:
  - Reality Bites

== 2nd Society of Texas Film Critics Awards (1995) ==
2nd Society of Texas Film Critics Awards
- Date: December 28, 1995
- Location: San Antonio, Texas
- Country: United States
- Presented by: Society of Texas Film Critics

The 2nd Society of Texas Film Critics Awards were given by the STFC on December 28, 1995. The list of winners was announced by STFC president Joe Leydon. The Usual Suspects received four awards, more than any other film.

=== Winners ===
- Best Film:
  - The Usual Suspects
- Best Director:
  - Bryan Singer – The Usual Suspects
- Best Actor:
  - Nicolas Cage – Leaving Las Vegas
- Best Actress:
  - Emma Thompson – Carrington; Sense and Sensibility
- Best Supporting Actor:
  - Kevin Spacey – The Usual Suspects; Seven; Outbreak
- Best Supporting Actress:
  - Joan Allen – Nixon
- Best Original Screenplay:
  - Christopher McQuarrie – The Usual Suspects
- Best Adapted Screenplay:
  - Emma Thompson – Sense and Sensibility
- Best Foreign Language Film:
  - Il Postino (The Postman) – Italy
- Best Documentary Film:
  - Crumb
- Lone Star Award (for a motion picture filmed in part and/or set in Texas):
  - Apollo 13

== 3rd Society of Texas Film Critics Awards (1996) ==
3rd Society of Texas Film Critics Awards
- Date: December 19, 1996
- Location: San Antonio, Texas
- Country: United States
- Presented by: Society of Texas Film Critics

The 3rd Society of Texas Film Critics Awards were given by the STFC on December 19, 1996. The list of winners was announced by STFC president Joe Leydon.

=== Winners ===
- Best Film:
  - Fargo
- Best Director:
  - John Sayles – Lone Star
- Best Actor:
  - Geoffrey Rush – Shine
- Best Actress:
  - Frances McDormand – Fargo
- Best Supporting Actor:
  - Edward Norton – The People vs. Larry Flynt; Primal Fear
- Best Supporting Actress:
  - Miranda Richardson – The Evening Star; Kansas City
- Best Original Screenplay:
  - John Sayles – Lone Star
- Best Adapted Screenplay:
  - Anthony Minghella – The English Patient
- Best Foreign Language Film:
  - Ridicule – France
- Best Documentary Film:
  - Microcosmos

== 4th Society of Texas Film Critics Awards (1997) ==
4th Society of Texas Film Critics Awards
- Date: December 29, 1997
- Location: San Antonio, Texas
- Country: United States
- Presented by: Society of Texas Film Critics

The 4th Society of Texas Film Critics Awards were given by the Society of Texas Film Critics (STFC) on December 29, 1997.

=== Winners ===
- Best Film:
  - The Sweet Hereafter
- Best Director:
  - Atom Egoyan – The Sweet Hereafter
- Best Actor:
  - Robert Duvall – The Apostle
- Best Actress:
  - Helena Bonham Carter – The Wings of the Dove
- Best Supporting Actor:
  - Kevin Spacey – L.A. Confidential; Midnight in the Garden of Good and Evil
- Best Supporting Actress:
  - Joan Cusack – In & Out
- Best Original Screenplay:
  - In the Company of Men – Neil LaBute
- Best Adapted Screenplay:
  - L.A. Confidential – Brian Helgeland and Curtis Hanson
- Best Foreign Language Film:
  - Shall We Dance? (Shall we dansu?) – Japan
- Best Documentary Feature:
  - Fast, Cheap & Out of Control
