= List of accolades received by Sense and Sensibility (film) =

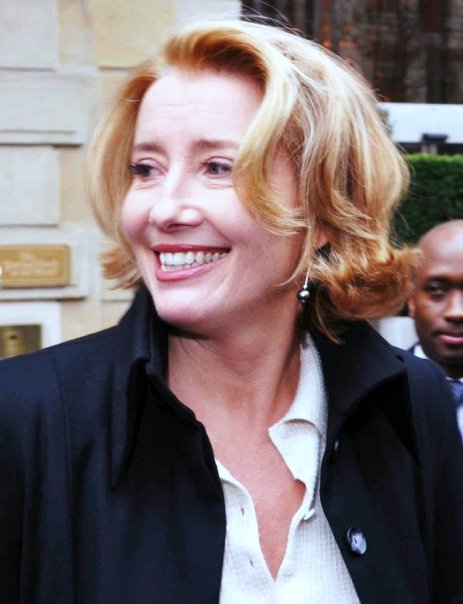
- Emma Thompson received more than ten awards for her adaptation of Jane Austen's novel, including the Academy Award for Best Writing (Adapted Screenplay).
Awards & nominations
Award	Won	Nominated
Academy Award	1	7
American Film Institute Award	1	3
Berlin International Film Festival	1	1
Boston Society of Film Critics	3	3
British Academy Film Award	3	12
British Society of Cinematographers	0	1
Broadcast Film Critics Association Award	2	2
Deutscher Filmpreis	1	1
Directors Guild of America	0	1
Evening Standard British Film Award	2	2
Golden Globe Award	2	6
London Critics Circle Film Award	1	1
Los Angeles Film Critics Association Award	1	1
National Board of Review of Motion Pictures	3	3
New York Film Critics Circle Award	2	2
Satellite Award	0	1
Screen Actors Guild Award	1	3
Society of Texas Film Critics Award	2	2
USC Scripter Award	1	1
Writers Guild of America Award	1	1
Writers' Guild of Great Britain	1	1
- Total number of wins and nominations
Totals	29	55
- References

Sense and Sensibility is a 1995 British period drama film directed by Ang Lee. Actress Emma Thompson wrote the screenplay, which is based on the 1811 novel of the same name by English author Jane Austen. Thompson and Kate Winslet starred as the Dashwood sisters among a large ensemble cast. Columbia Pictures, a Sony Pictures Entertainment subsidiary, produced and released the film. Sense and Sensibility was released to cinemas on 15 December 1995, and earned a total worldwide gross of $134,582,776. Based on 67 reviews from film critics, the review aggregator website Rotten Tomatoes has calculated Sense and Sensibility's approval rating to be 97%.

Sense and Sensibility received accolades for the main cast's performances and Thompson's screenwriting. The adaptation received seven Academy Award nominations including the Academy Award for Best Picture, though the sole win that night was for the Academy Award for Best Writing (Adapted Screenplay), the only time a person has earned Oscars for both acting and writing. (Note: Thompson won the Academy Award for her performance in the 1992 film Howards End.) Thompson's screenwriting collected a further eleven accolades, including those given by the Broadcast Film Critics Association, Golden Globe Awards, and London Critics Circle. At the 49th British Academy Film Awards, Sense and Sensibility garnered twelve BAFTA nominations, ultimately coming away with three awards including the BAFTA Award for Best Film; Thompson and Winslet won the BAFTA Award for Best Actress in a Leading Role and BAFTA Award for Best Actress in a Supporting Role, respectively.

The cast also received numerous acting accolades. In addition to her writing credit, Thompson was recognised for her performance, and earned seven nominations. Winslet was recognised in categories for both lead and supporting actress, for instance winning the Evening Standard Award for Best Actress as well as the Screen Actors Guild Award for Outstanding Performance by a Female Actor in a Supporting Role. Other than the Academy Awards, the overall film garnered numerous nominations, ultimately winning the Boston Society of Film Critics Award for Best Film, Broadcast Film Critics Association Award for Best Film, and Golden Globe Award for Best Motion Picture – Drama, among other accolades. Sense and Sensibility received the most award recognition out of the many Austen adaptations of the 1990s. MaryAnn Johanson of Film.com named it the fifth best film of 1995.

== Accolades ==
Award	Date of ceremony^{[I]}	Category	Recipients and nominees	Result
Academy Awards	25 March 1996	Best Picture	Lindsay Doran	Nominated
Academy Awards	25 March 1996	Best Actress	Emma Thompson	Nominated
Academy Awards	25 March 1996	Best Supporting Actress	Kate Winslet	Nominated
Academy Awards	25 March 1996	Best Writing (Adapted Screenplay)	Emma Thompson	Won
Academy Awards	25 March 1996	Best Cinematography	Michael Coulter	Nominated
Academy Awards	25 March 1996	Best Costume Design	Jenny Beavan and John Bright	Nominated
Academy Awards	25 March 1996	Best Original Dramatic Score	Patrick Doyle	Nominated
American Film Institute		AFI's 100 Years of Film Scores	Sense and Sensibility	Nominated
American Film Institute		AFI's 100 Years...100 Movies	Sense and Sensibility	Nominated
American Film Institute		AFI's 100 Years...100 Passions	Sense and Sensibility	Included
Berlin International Film Festival	26 February 1996	Golden Bear	Sense and Sensibility	Won
Boston Society of Film Critics	17 December 1995	Best Film	Sense and Sensibility	Won
Boston Society of Film Critics	17 December 1995	Best Director	Ang Lee	Won
Boston Society of Film Critics	17 December 1995	Best Screenplay	Emma Thompson	Won
British Academy Film Awards	23 April 1996	Best Film	Sense and Sensibility	Won
British Academy Film Awards	23 April 1996	Best Direction	Ang Lee	Nominated
British Academy Film Awards	23 April 1996	Best Actress in a Leading Role	Emma Thompson	Won
British Academy Film Awards	23 April 1996	Best Actor in a Supporting Role	Alan Rickman	Nominated
British Academy Film Awards	23 April 1996	Best Actress in a Supporting Role	Kate Winslet	Won
British Academy Film Awards	23 April 1996	Best Actress in a Supporting Role	Elizabeth Spriggs	Nominated
British Academy Film Awards	23 April 1996	Best Adapted Screenplay	Emma Thompson	Nominated
British Academy Film Awards	23 April 1996	Best Cinematography	Michael Coulter	Nominated
British Academy Film Awards	23 April 1996	Best Costume Design	Jenny Beavan and John Bright	Nominated
British Academy Film Awards	23 April 1996	Best Film Music	Patrick Doyle	Nominated
British Academy Film Awards	23 April 1996	Best Makeup and Hair	Morag Ross, Jan Archibald	Nominated
British Academy Film Awards	23 April 1996	Best Production Design	Luciana Arrighi	Nominated
British Society of Cinematographers	1995	Best Cinematography Award	Michael Coulter	Nominated
Critics' Choice Movie Awards	22 January 1996	Best Film	Sense and Sensibility	Won
Critics' Choice Movie Awards	22 January 1996	Best Screenplay	Emma Thompson	Won
Deutscher Filmpreis	6 June 1997	Best Foreign Film	Ang Lee	Won
Directors Guild of America	2 March 1996	Outstanding Directing – Feature Film	Ang Lee	Nominated
Evening Standard British Film Awards	2 February 1997	Best Actress	Kate Winslet (also for Jude)	Won
Evening Standard British Film Awards	2 February 1997	Best Screenplay	Emma Thompson (tied with John Hodge for Trainspotting)	Won
Golden Globe Awards	21 January 1996	Best Motion Picture – Drama	Sense and Sensibility	Won
Golden Globe Awards	21 January 1996	Best Director	Ang Lee	Nominated
Golden Globe Awards	21 January 1996	Best Actress – Motion Picture Drama	Emma Thompson	Nominated
Golden Globe Awards	21 January 1996	Best Supporting Actress – Motion Picture	Kate Winslet	Nominated
Golden Globe Awards	21 January 1996	Best Screenplay	Emma Thompson	Won
Golden Globe Awards	21 January 1996	Best Original Score	Patrick Doyle	Nominated
London Critics Circle Film Awards	2 March 1997	British Screenwriter of the Year	Emma Thompson	Won
Los Angeles Film Critics Association Awards	16 December 1995	Best Screenplay	Emma Thompson	Won
National Board of Review of Motion Pictures	26 February 1996	Best Director	Ang Lee	Won
National Board of Review of Motion Pictures	26 February 1996	Best Actress	Emma Thompson (also for Carrington)	Won
National Board of Review of Motion Pictures	26 February 1996	Top Ten Films	Sense and Sensibility	Won
New York Film Critics Circle Awards	7 January 1996	Best Director	Ang Lee	Won
New York Film Critics Circle Awards	7 January 1996	Best Screenplay	Emma Thompson	Won
Satellite Awards	January 1996	Best Classic DVD	Sense and Sensibility For the Classic Masterpiece Book & DVD set containing Sense and Sensibility, Persuasion and Little Women	Nominated
Screen Actors Guild Awards	24 February 1996	Outstanding Performance by a Female Actor in a Leading Role	Emma Thompson	Nominated
Screen Actors Guild Awards	24 February 1996	Outstanding Performance by a Female Actor in a Supporting Role	Kate Winslet	Won
Screen Actors Guild Awards	24 February 1996	Outstanding Performance by a Cast in a Motion Picture	Hugh Grant, Alan Rickman, Emma Thompson, Kate Winslet	Nominated
Society of Texas Film Critics Awards	28 December 1995	Best Actress	Emma Thompson (also for Carrington)	Won
Society of Texas Film Critics Awards	28 December 1995	Best Adapted Screenplay	Emma Thompson	Won
USC Scripter Awards	1996	USC Scripter Award	Emma Thompson	Won
Writers Guild of America Awards	17 March 1996	Best Screenplay Based on Material Previously Produced or Published	Emma Thompson	Won
Writers' Guild of Great Britain	1996	Film – Screenplay	Emma Thompson	Won

^{^[I]} Each year is linked to the article about the awards held that year.

== See also ==
- 1995 in film
- List of awards and nominations received by Emma Thompson
