= Boston Society of Film Critics Awards 1994 =

Annual US film awards ceremony

15th BSFC Awards

December 18, 1994

Best Film:
Pulp Fiction

The 15th Boston Society of Film Critics Awards honored the best filmmaking of 1994. The awards were given on 18 December 1994.

== Winners ==
=== Best Film ===
1. Pulp Fiction
2. Vanya on 42nd Street
3. Ed Wood

=== Best Actor ===
1. Albert Finney – The Browning Version
2. Wallace Shawn – Vanya on 42nd Street
3. Henry Czerny – The Boys of St. Vincent

=== Best Actress ===
1. Julianne Moore – Vanya on 42nd Street
2. Linda Fiorentino – The Last Seduction
3. Jodie Foster – Nell

=== Best Supporting Actor ===
- Martin Landau – Ed Wood

=== Best Supporting Actress ===
1. Kirsten Dunst – Interview with the Vampire and Little Women
2. Dianne Wiest – Bullets Over Broadway
3. Tracey Ullman – Bullets Over Broadway, I'll Do Anything and Prêt-à-Porter

=== Best Director ===
1. Quentin Tarantino – Pulp Fiction
2. Louis Malle – Vanya on 42nd Street
3. Robert Redford – Quiz Show

=== Best Screenplay ===
1. Quentin Tarantino and Roger Avary – Pulp Fiction
2. Paul Attanasio – Quiz Show
3. François Girard and Don McKellar – Thirty Two Short Films About Glenn Gould

=== Best Cinematography ===
- Stefan Czapsky – Ed Wood

=== Best Documentary ===
- Hoop Dreams

=== Best Foreign-Language Film ===
- Red (Trois couleurs: Rouge) • France/Poland/Switzerland
