= 1994 Los Angeles Film Critics Association Awards =

US film awards

20th LAFCA Awards
- Date: December 10, 1994

Highlights
- Best Picture: Pulp Fiction

The 20th Los Angeles Film Critics Association Awards, honoring the best in film for 1994, were given on 10 December 1994.

== Winners ==
- Best Picture:
  - Pulp Fiction
- Runner-up: The Shawshank Redemption
- Best Director:
  - Quentin Tarantino – Pulp Fiction
- Runner-up: Robert Redford - Quiz Show
- Best Actor:
  - John Travolta – Pulp Fiction
- Runner-up: Morgan Freeman - The Shawshank Redemption
- Best Actress:
  - Jessica Lange – Blue Sky
- Runner-up: Jodie Foster - Nell
- Best Supporting Actor:
  - Martin Landau – Ed Wood
- Runner-up: Samuel L Jackson - Pulp Fiction
- Best Supporting Actress:
  - Dianne Wiest – Bullets over Broadway
- Runner-up: Uma Thurman - Pulp Fiction
- Best Screenplay:
  - Quentin Tarantino and Roger Avary – Pulp Fiction
- Runner-up: Frank Darabont - The Shawshank Redemption
- Best Cinematography:
  - Stefan Czapsky – Ed Wood
- Runner-up: John Toll - Legends of the Fall
- Best Production Design:
  - Dennis Gassner - The Hudsucker Proxy
- Best Music Score:
  - Howard Shore – Ed Wood
- Best Foreign-Language Film:
  - Red (Trois couleurs: Rouge) • Poland/France/Switzerland
- Runner-up: Burnt by the Sun • Russia
- Best Non-Fiction Film:
  - Hoop Dreams
- Best Animation:
  - The Lion King
- The Douglas Edwards Experimental/Independent Film/Video Award:
  - John Maybury – Remembrance of Things Fast: True Stories Visual Lies
- New Generation Award:
  - John Dahl – Red Rock West and The Last Seduction
- Career Achievement Award:
  - Billy Wilder
- Special Citation:
  - Pauline Kael
