= Society of Texas Film Critics Awards 1995 =

US film awards ceremony in 1995

2nd Society of Texas Film Critics Awards
- Date: December 28, 1995
- Location: San Antonio, Texas
- Country: United States
- Presented by: Society of Texas Film Critics

The 2nd Society of Texas Film Critics Awards were given by the Society of Texas Film Critics (STFC) on December 28, 1995. The list of winners was announced by STFC president, Joe Leydon. Founded in 1994, the Society of Texas Film Critics members included 18 film critics working for print and broadcast outlets across the state of Texas. The Usual Suspects received four awards, more than any other film.

== Winners ==
- Best Film:
  - The Usual Suspects
- Best Director:
  - Bryan Singer – The Usual Suspects
- Best Actor:
  - Nicolas Cage – Leaving Las Vegas
- Best Actress:
  - Emma Thompson – Carrington and Sense and Sensibility
- Best Supporting Actor:
  - Kevin Spacey – The Usual Suspects, Se7en, and Outbreak
- Best Supporting Actress:
  - Joan Allen – Nixon
- Best Original Screenplay:
  - Christopher McQuarrie – The Usual Suspects
- Best Adapted Screenplay:
  - Emma Thompson – Sense and Sensibility
- Best Foreign Language Film:
  - Il Postino (The Postman) – Italy
- Best Documentary Film:
  - Crumb
- Lone Star Award (for a motion picture filmed in part and/or set in Texas):
  - Apollo 13
