= Lindsay Doran =

American film producer (born 1948)

- Born: 22 June 1948 (age 78); Los Angeles, California, U.S.
- Education: University of California, Santa Cruz
- Occupation: Producer
- Years active: 1984–present
- Spouse: Rodney Kemerer
- Parent(s): D. A. Doran; Marion Avery

Lindsay Doran (born 22 June 1948) is an American film producer and studio executive who has worked on such films as This Is Spinal Tap, Ferris Bueller's Day Off, Stranger Than Fiction, and Nanny McPhee. She is best known for producing the 1995 adaptation of Sense and Sensibility, for which she received a number of accolades, including the BAFTA Award for Best Film and the Golden Globe Award for Best Motion Picture – Drama, as well as being nominated for the Academy Award for Best Picture.

== Early life ==
Much of Doran's family has worked in the Hollywood film industry. She was born to D. A. Doran, a 55-year-old veteran Hollywood executive producer. Her mother, Marion Avery, began her career in film as a script typewriter for Preston Sturges before marrying D.A., and later became head of the play department at Columbia Pictures. Doran also has a brother, Daniel, a publicist whose work includes the 1968 film 2001: A Space Odyssey. She recalled, "[Film] was all around me and what I saw was people who loved it and people who did not have to compromise who they were to be successful in the movie business." D.A. used to provide his daughter with screenplays and short stories, asking her opinion on whether they could be adapted into good films.

In 1967 Doran began attending Barnard College, an all-women liberal arts college in New York City. There, she studied English literature but due to financial constraints she transferred after her first year to University of California, Los Angeles. Following three semesters, Doran then transferred to University of California, Santa Cruz, taking "courses in dance, art history, music and architecture." Upon graduating, she moved to London in 1971. She explained of the experience, "I thought I wanted to live there forever, but I couldn't get a visa. I did some writing for film encyclopedias. I had a flat with no heat in Earl's Court and a lot of free time, so I spent most of it in the Brompton Road library. I'd pick an author and read everything." It was in London that she acquired a love of Jane Austen and her works, especially Austen's first published novel, Sense and Sensibility.

== Career in film industry ==
Doran moved to State College, Pennsylvania upon returning from London, where she worked for seven years with public television, first as a secretary and later as a producer and writer. She met her husband, architectural designer Rodney Kemerer, there before returning to Los Angeles, despite her previous desire to not live in the city or work in the film business. Having to begin anew in a new place, Doran found that her "skills writing for public television were completely useless," forcing her to again take work as a secretary. She worked at the Screen Actors Guild, where she "learned a lot" and soon received another job at Hollywood studio Avco Embassy Pictures, working her way up. When Doran was approximately 30 years old, she became an executive at Embassy. There, she worked on comedy films directed by Rob Reiner, including This Is Spinal Tap and The Sure Thing. In 1985, she became the vice president of production for Paramount Pictures in Los Angeles. Her early work as a studio executive at Paramount saw her supervising five films simultaneously. She stated that it was "a 12-hour-a-day job. It was difficult to get involved on a line-by-line basis in a screenplay and I did it anyway because that's what I love to do." There, she oversaw the development of Ghost, Planes, Trains and Automobiles, The Naked Gun, Pretty in Pink and Ferris Bueller's Day Off, among other films. She developed the script for the 1991 film Dead Again, beginning a professional relationship with actress Emma Thompson that would last more than five films and 20 years.

In 1989 Doran became a producer at Mirage Enterprises, a studio co-founded by director-producer Sydney Pollack. She found that in contrast to being a studio executive, the role of a producer required that she "initiate everything" rather than receive calls from others. She commented, "But in the end that's what I prefer because I can work closely on the script and be in the editing room if that's what it requires. You can supervise every aspect of it." One of her first tasks in her new role was attending a company retreat to brainstorm new projects. Doran suggested Sense and Sensibility to the studio, her favorite book. After the film Dead Again had wrapped, she successfully persuaded Thompson to adapt it to film. Doran explained, "For 10 years I'd been trying to find somebody I thought could adapt it. Usually romantics are too optimistic and dreamy to see Austen's cynicism, and satirists are too cynical to believe in romance." Thompson fit Doran's criteria for a good screenwriter, despite the actress never having written a screenplay before. The resulting production of Sense and Sensibility earned Thompson an Academy Award for Best Adapted Screenplay, making her the only person to have won an Oscar for both her writing and acting (Thompson won the Best Actress award for Howards End, in 1993). Along with producing, Doran had a small cameo in the film as a maid.

In 1996 Doran ended her partnership with Pollack, citing a need for change, and was quickly hired as the new president and chief operating officer of small studio United Artists, replacing John Calley. There, Thompson approached her with a proposal to adapt the stories of Nurse Matilda into film, with Thompson starring. She and Doran proceeded to work on the adaptation for "a good seven years" and released Nanny McPhee two years later, in 2005. Doran noted that MGM, owner of United Artists, "didn't want to make the movie and didn't believe in it. A lot of people wanted to do it and Working Title came to us and were interested in working with Emma and with Kirk Jones who was attached as the director so they were willing to put up the money through Universal so we made the movie that way." They released its sequel, Nanny McPhee and the Big Bang, in 2010. Other films Doran oversaw included Tomorrow Never Dies, The World Is Not Enough, Ronin, and The Thomas Crown Affair.
