= Susan Bode =

American set decorator

- Other names: Susan Bode-Tyson; Susan Tyson
- Occupation: Set decorator
- Years active: 1982-present

Susan Bode is a set decorator. She was nominated for an Academy Award in the category Best Art Direction for the film Bullets over Broadway.

== Selected filmography ==
- Bullets over Broadway (1994)
- The Object of My Affection (1998)
