= 1994 New York Film Critics Circle Awards =

60th New York Film Critics Circle Awards

60th New York Film Critics Circle Awards

January 22, 1995

Best Picture:
Quiz Show

The 60th New York Film Critics Circle Awards honored the best filmmaking of 1994. The winners were announced on 15 December 1994 and the awards were given on 22 January 1995.

== Winners ==
- Best Actor:
  - Paul Newman - Nobody's Fool
  - Runner-up: Samuel L. Jackson - Pulp Fiction
- Best Actress:
  - Linda Fiorentino - The Last Seduction
  - Runner-up: Jodie Foster - Nell
- Best Cinematography:
  - Stefan Czapsky - Ed Wood
- Best Director:
  - Quentin Tarantino - Pulp Fiction
  - Runner-up: Krzysztof Kieślowski - Red (Trois couleurs: Rouge)
- Best Documentary:
  - Hoop Dreams
- Best Film:
  - Quiz Show
  - Runner-up: Pulp Fiction
- Best Foreign Language Film:
  - Red (Trois couleurs: Rouge) • France/Switzerland/Poland
- Best New Director
  - Darnell Martin - I Like It Like That
  - Runners-up: Kevin Smith - Clerks and David O. Russell - Spanking the Monkey
- Best Screenplay:
  - Quentin Tarantino and Roger Avery - Pulp Fiction
  - Runner-up: Paul Attanasio - Quiz Show
- Best Supporting Actor:
  - Martin Landau - Ed Wood
  - Runner-up: Paul Scofield - Quiz Show
- Best Supporting Actress:
  - Dianne Wiest - Bullets over Broadway
  - Runners-up: Uma Thurman - Pulp Fiction and Alfre Woodard - Crooklyn
- Special Award:
  - Jean-Luc Godard
