= Society of Texas Film Critics Awards 1996 =

US film awards ceremony in 1996

3rd Society of Texas Film Critics Awards
- Date: December 19, 1996
- Location: San Antonio, Texas
- Country: United States
- Presented by: Society of Texas Film Critics

The 3rd Society of Texas Film Critics Awards were given by the Society of Texas Film Critics (STFC) on December 19, 1996. The list of winners was announced by STFC president Joe Leydon. Founded in 1994, the Society of Texas Film Critics members included film critics working for print and broadcast outlets across the state of Texas.

== Winners ==
- Best Film:
  - Fargo
- Best Director:
  - John Sayles – Lone Star
- Best Actor:
  - Geoffrey Rush – Shine
- Best Actress:
  - Frances McDormand – Fargo
- Best Supporting Actor:
  - Edward Norton – The People vs. Larry Flynt and Primal Fear
- Best Supporting Actress:
  - Miranda Richardson – The Evening Star and Kansas City
- Best Original Screenplay:
  - John Sayles – Lone Star
- Best Adapted Screenplay:
  - Anthony Minghella – The English Patient
- Best Foreign Language Film:
  - Ridicule – France
- Best Documentary Film:
  - Microcosmos
