= Society of Texas Film Critics Awards 1994 =

US film awards ceremony in 1994

1st Society of Texas Film Critics Awards
- Date: December 17, 1994
- Location: San Antonio, Texas
- Country: United States
- Presented by: Society of Texas Film Critics

The 1st Society of Texas Film Critics Awards were given by the Society of Texas Film Critics (STFC) on December 17, 1994. The list of winners was announced by STFC founder Michael MacCambridge, then also a film critic for the Austin American-Statesman. Founded in 1994, the Society of Texas Film Critics members included 21 film critics working for print and broadcast outlets across the state of Texas. The society's first meeting was held in the Representative Boardroom at the Omni Austin Hotel. Pulp Fiction took the top honor and a total of four awards, more than any other film, in this initial awards presentation.

== Winners ==
- Best Film:
  - Pulp Fiction
- Best Director:
  - Quentin Tarantino – Pulp Fiction
- Best Actor:
  - Samuel L. Jackson – Pulp Fiction
- Best Actress:
  - Linda Fiorentino – The Last Seduction
- Best Supporting Actor:
  - Martin Landau – Ed Wood
- Best Supporting Actress:
  - Dianne Wiest – Bullets over Broadway
- Best Screenplay:
  - Quentin Tarantino and Roger Avary – Pulp Fiction
- Best Documentary Film:
  - Hoop Dreams
- The Lone Star Award, recognizing the best Texas film of the year:
  - Reality Bites
