= Sue Parrill =

American literary scholar

- Born: 1935 (age 90–91)
- Occupation: Professor

Academic work
- Discipline: 19th-century English literature
- Sub-discipline: Literary adaptation

Anna Sue Parrill (born 1935) is a scholar of 19th-century English literature. She has published articles and books on film and television productions set in the Tudor and Napoleonic periods, as well as on adaptations of Jane Austen's novels.

== Career ==
In 2002 McFarland published Jane Austen on Film and Television, a work described in 2005 as "the most comprehensive critical survey of all the film and television adaptations of Austen's novels". It has been quoted in media articles as well as by Austen and film scholars such as Deborah Cartmell. In 2003, she attended the Eighteenth Century Women Writers Conference in Winchester, England where she presented her paper "The Americanization of Jane: Three Early Television Adaptations". Parrill has also contributed articles to Persuasions, a journal by the Jane Austen Society of North America, in addition to serving as that organization's book review editor.

In December 2012 McFarland published The Tudors on Film and Television, a book she co-authored with William B. Robison, one of her colleagues in Southeastern Louisiana University's History and Political Science Department. Robison described the work as a "comprehensive filmography and a historical analysis of Tudor films". In the year leading up to the book's release, the pair created a website and Facebook page with the intent of facilitating discussion and supplementing the content seen in their book.

== Selected bibliography ==
Articles

- "Metaphors of Control: Physicality in Emma and Clueless". Persuasions On-Line. 20. Jane Austen Society of North America. 1999.
- "What Meets the Eye: Landscape in the Films Pride and Prejudice and Sense and Sensibility". Persuasions On-Line. 20. Jane Austen Society of North America: 32–43. 1999.
- "'Pride and Prejudice' on A & E: Visions and Revisions". Literature/Film Quarterly. 27. Salisbury University. 1999.
- "Not the Bluebird of Happiness: Bird Imagery in the Film Mansfield Park". Literature/Film Quarterly. 31 (3). Salisbury University: 186–192. 2003.

Books

- Jane Austen on Film and Television: A Critical Study of the Adaptations. McFarland. 2002. ISBN 0-7864-1349-2.
- Nelson's Navy in Fiction and Film: Depictions of British Sea Power in the Napoleonic Era. McFarland. 2009. ISBN 978-0786438556.
- The Tudors on Film and Television. McFarland. 2013. ISBN 978-0786458912. (with William B. Robison)
