= Chicago Film Critics Association Awards 1994 =

Film award edition

7th CFCA Awards

Best Film:
Hoop Dreams

The 7th Chicago Film Critics Association Awards honored the finest achievements in 1994 filmmaking.

== Winners ==
- Best Actor:
  - Tom Hanks - Forrest Gump
- Best Actress:
  - Jennifer Jason Leigh - Mrs. Parker and the Vicious Circle
- Best Director:
  - Quentin Tarantino - Pulp Fiction
- Best Film:
  - Hoop Dreams
- Best Foreign Language Film:
  - Trois couleurs: Rouge (Red), Poland/France/Switzerland
- Best Score:
  - "The Lion King" - Hans Zimmer
- Best Screenplay:
  - Pulp Fiction - Roger Avary and Quentin Tarantino
- Best Supporting Actor:
  - Martin Landau - Ed Wood
- Best Supporting Actress:
  - Dianne Wiest - Bullets over Broadway
- Most Promising Actor:
  - Hugh Grant - Four Weddings and a Funeral
- Most Promising Actress:
  - Kirsten Dunst - Interview with the Vampire
