= The Last Seduction =

1994 film by John Dahl

- Theatrical release poster
- Directed by: John Dahl
- Written by: Steve Barancik
- Produced by: Jonathan Shestack
- Starring: Linda Fiorentino; Peter Berg; Bill Pullman
- Cinematography: Jeffrey Jur
- Edited by: Eric L. Beason
- Music by: Joseph Vitarelli
- Production company: ITC Entertainment Group
- Distributed by: October Films
- Release dates: January 10, 1994 (PSIFF); October 26, 1994 (United States)
- Running time: 110 minutes
- Country: United States
- Language: English
- Budget: $2.5 million (est.)
- Box office: $5.8 million

The Last Seduction is a 1994 American neo-noir erotic thriller film directed by John Dahl and starring Linda Fiorentino, Peter Berg, and Bill Pullman. It was produced by ITC Entertainment and distributed by October Films.

Fiorentino's performance garnered acclaim and generated talk of an Academy Award nomination, but she was deemed ineligible because the film was broadcast in July 1994 on HBO before its theatrical release on October 26. October Films and ITC Entertainment sued the Academy of Motion Picture Arts and Sciences but were unable to make Fiorentino eligible for a nomination.

The Last Seduction has gained a cult following over time, and its main character, Bridget Gregory, has been recognized as one of the most iconic femmes fatales. In 2019, the British Film Institute included the film, along with Gone Girl and Death Becomes Her, in a program dedicated to exploring "wickedly compelling female characters on screen". The film was also featured in The Criterion Channel's Neonoir series in July 2021. A direct-to-video sequel, The Last Seduction II, was released in 1999, featuring none of the original cast and starring Joan Severance as Bridget Gregory.

== Plot ==
Bridget Gregory works as a telemarketing manager in New York City. Her husband, Clay, a physician in debt to a loan shark, sells pharmaceutical cocaine to drug dealers for $700,000. At home, Clay slaps Bridget after she insults him. She flees their apartment with the money, headed to Chicago.

Bridget stops in Beston, a small town near Buffalo. She has sex with Mike Swale, a local man back from a whirlwind marriage in Buffalo, which he refuses to talk about. Bridget changes her name to Wendy Kroy, and takes a job at the insurance company where Mike works. They begin a relationship, but Bridget refuses to tell Mike about her past.

When Mike tells her how to tell if a man is cheating on his wife by reading his credit reports, Bridget devises a plan based on selling murders to cheated wives. When Mike objects, they argue and he leaves. A private detective hired by Clay, Harlan, holds Bridget at gunpoint in her car. Bridget tricks him into removing his seatbelt, then purposely crashes her car, killing him. As Harlan was black, she takes advantage of local racism to persuade the police to close the case without investigation.

Bridget lies to Mike that she has traveled to Florida to kill Lance Collier, an abusive husband. Instead, she goes to Buffalo to meet Mike's ex-wife, Trish. Upon returning, Bridget shows Mike the money she stole from Clay, claiming it is her cut of the life insurance payout from the Florida job. She tells Mike they can start a life together with the money, but insists he must murder a tax lawyer in New York who is cheating elderly women out of their homes. When he refuses, Bridget forges a letter from Trish saying she is moving to Beston. Desperate to avoid Trish, Mike accepts the job.

Bridget swaps the name on Clay's door with the name of the attorney Mike believes he has been sent to kill. Mike enters the apartment and handcuffs Clay. Clay realizes what is happening when Mike mentions Bridget's alias and shows Mike a photo of himself and Bridget together. They form a plan to double-cross her. When Bridget arrives, Clay tries to make amends with her, but she empties a canister of chemical mace down his throat, killing him. She tells a stunned Mike to "rape" her. When he refuses, she tells him she knows that Trish is transgender and goads him with homophobic slurs. While Mike has rough sex with her, she dials 911 and allows them to listen, incriminating Mike. He is jailed for rape and murder, while Bridget escapes with Clay's money and multimillion-dollar life insurance payout. In a limousine, she burns the apartment label, the only evidence linking her to Clay's death.

== Cast ==
- Linda Fiorentino as Bridget Gregory / Wendy Kroy
- Peter Berg as Mike Swale
- J. T. Walsh as Frank Griffith
- Bill Nunn as Harlan
- Bill Pullman as Clay Gregory
- Dean Norris as Shep
- Herb Mitchell as Bob Trotter

== Production ==
Screenwriter Steve Barancik said he believed the film was originally pitched to ITC Entertainment as a "standard Skinemax" low-budget film, even though the filmmakers had "an under-the-radar intention to make a good movie." Linda Fiorentino said of accepting the role, "After I read that script, I was in Arizona and I got in a car and drove six hours to get to the meeting because I had never read anything so unique in terms of a female character. And I walked in the meeting with John Dahl, the director, and I said, 'John, you are not allowed to hire anyone but me for this film.' And I wasn't kidding."

ITC Entertainment executives were upset with a scene in which Fiorentino is dressed as a cheerleader and wears suspenders over her breasts. Barancik recalled, "Apparently, a guy from the company who was monitoring things and watching the dailies saw the suspenders over Linda's nipples and shouted out, 'Are we making an art movie?!' He shut down production and called the principals of the movie on the carpet, and they all had to pledge that they had no artistic pretensions." The scene was cut, and the sexual role-playing theme was lost.

Peter Berg said it was Fiorentino's idea to shoot the chain-link-fence sex scene in that way. "She said, 'John, get a camera,' and she climbed up on me against that fence and told John Dahl to shoot it, and that was the scene. She thought of it, she conceived it, she executed it. It was awesome."

== Reception ==
=== Critical response ===
The Last Seduction received critical acclaim. On Rotten Tomatoes, the film holds an approval rating of 94% based on 50 reviews, with an average rating of 8/10. The website's critics consensus reads, "Like Body Heat, The Last Seduction updates film noir techniques for a modern era, imbuing this erotic film with '90s snark." On Metacritic, which assigns a weighted average score out of 100 to reviews from mainstream critics, the film received an average score of 85, based on 12 reviews, indicating "universal acclaim". Roger Ebert gave the film four out of four stars, highlighting Fiorentino's ability to project her character with dry humor and a freedom from Hollywood conventions typically surrounding a female antagonist. Ebert later ranked the film fifth on his year-end list of 1994's best films. He wrote in the Chicago Sun-Times:

John Dahl's The Last Seduction knows how much we enjoy seeing a character work boldly outside the rules. It gives us a diabolical, evil woman, and goes the distance with her. We keep waiting for the movie to lose its nerve, and it never does: This woman is bad from beginning to end, she never reforms, she never compromises, and the movie doesn't tack on one of those contrived conclusions where the morals squad comes in and tidies up.

Director Quentin Tarantino rated The Last Seduction at number 77 of his favorite films.

=== Year-end lists ===
- 5th – Roger Ebert, Chicago Sun-Times
- 6th – Janet Maslin, The New York Times
- 8th – Bob Strauss, Los Angeles Daily News
- 8th – Glenn Lovell, San Jose Mercury News
- 9th – Todd Anthony, Miami New Times
- 10th – Michael Mills, The Palm Beach Post
- Top 10 (listed alphabetically, not ranked) – Eleanor Ringel, The Atlanta Journal-Constitution
- Top 10 (listed alphabetically, not ranked) – Jeff Simon, The Buffalo News
- Honorable mention – Michael MacCambridge, Austin American-Statesman
- Honorable mention – Betsy Pickle, Knoxville News-Sentinel
- Honorable mention – William Arnold, Seattle Post-Intelligencer

=== Accolades ===
Year	Award	Category	Recipient	Result
1995	BAFTA Awards	Best Actress	Linda Fiorentino	Nominated
1994	Chicago Film Critics Awards	Best Actress	Linda Fiorentino	Nominated
1994	Cognac Festival du Film Policier	Critics Award	John Dahl	Won
1995	Directors Guild of America Awards	Outstanding Achievement in Dramatic Specials	John Dahl	Nominated
1995	Edgar Allan Poe Awards	Best Motion Picture	Steve Barancik	Nominated
1995	Independent Spirit Awards	Best Female Lead	Linda Fiorentino	Won
1995	London Film Critics Circle Awards	Actress of the Year	Linda Fiorentino	Won
1994	Mystfest	Best Film	John Dahl	Nominated
1994	National Board of Review Awards	Best Film Made for Cable TV		Won
1994	New York Film Critics Circle Awards	Best Actress	Linda Fiorentino	Won
1994	Society of Texas Film Critics Awards	Best Actress	Linda Fiorentino	Won
