= Bullets Over Broadway =

1994 film by Woody Allen

- Theatrical release poster
- Directed by: Woody Allen
- Written by: Woody Allen; Douglas McGrath
- Produced by: Robert Greenhut
- Starring: Jim Broadbent; John Cusack; Harvey Fierstein; Chazz Palminteri; Mary-Louise Parker; Rob Reiner; Jennifer Tilly; Tracey Ullman; Joe Viterelli; Jack Warden; Dianne Wiest
- Cinematography: Carlo DiPalma
- Edited by: Susan E. Morse
- Production company: Sweetland Films
- Distributed by: Miramax Films
- Release dates: September 4, 1994 (Venice); October 14, 1994 (United States)
- Running time: 98 minutes
- Country: United States
- Language: English
- Budget: $20 million
- Box office: $37.5 million

Bullets Over Broadway is a 1994 American black comedy crime film directed by Woody Allen, written by Allen and Douglas McGrath, and starring an ensemble cast including John Cusack, Dianne Wiest, Chazz Palminteri and Jennifer Tilly. Set in 1920s New York City, the film centers on a struggling playwright who is urged to cast the talentless girlfriend of a notorious mobster in his newest play in order to get it produced.

Bullets Over Broadway premiered in Venice on September 4, 1994 and was released by Miramax Films on October 14, 1994 in the United States. The film was nominated for seven Academy Awards, including Allen for Best Director, Allen and McGrath for Best Original Screenplay, Palminteri for Best Supporting Actor, and both Tilly and Wiest for Best Supporting Actress, with Wiest winning for her performance, the second time Allen directed her to an Academy Award. The film is considered one of Allen's best works.

== Plot ==
In 1928, David Shayne is an idealistic young playwright newly arrived on Broadway from Pittsburgh. Desperate to gain financing for his play, God of Our Fathers, he is persuaded by producer Julian Marx to cast actress Olive Neal, the girlfriend of gangster Nick Valenti, in a minor role.

Compensating for his frustration with the demanding and talentless Olive, David is thrilled to cast alcoholic faded star Helen Sinclair in the lead role, along with the dieting British thespian Warner Purcell. Rehearsals are soon thrown into chaos when Olive shows up escorted by Cheech, a mob henchman, who insists on watching rehearsals.

Eventually Cheech starts giving notes on the script to David, who is initially angered by the intrusion but quickly realizes the ideas are excellent. Cheech, who barely learned to read before burning down his school, has a natural talent for playwriting, but is not interested in taking any credit. The cast members herald the revised script as genius, disparaging his initial draft as dull and pompous.

Buoyed by their imminent success, David and the actors succumb to their vices. His partner, Ellen, catches him cheating on her with Helen. Warner indulges in overeating and begins an affair with Olive, which he attempts to break off when Cheech threatens his life. Growing increasingly frustrated with Olive's poor acting, Cheech tries to have her fired from the production. After David reminds him he cannot get rid of Olive, Cheech murders her and dumps her body in a river.

Olive's murder is widely assumed to be part of an inter-gang conflict, but David immediately senses the truth and argues with Cheech. Regretting his mistakes, David is dismayed to learn that Ellen is leaving him for his hedonistic Marxist friend Sheldon Flender.

On opening night, Valenti accuses Cheech of Olive's murder, which he denies. Henchmen Rocco and Aldo chase Cheech backstage while the play is being performed, shooting him. With his dying words, Cheech gives David a new final line for the play. The play is a critical and commercial success, but David skips the after-party to confront Flender. He confesses his lack of talent and proposes marriage to Ellen, who accepts his newfound desire to leave high society and move back to Pittsburgh.

== Cast ==
- John Cusack as David Shayne
- Jack Warden as Julian Marx
- Chazz Palminteri as "Cheech"
- Joe Viterelli as Nick Valenti
- Jennifer Tilly as Olive Neal
- Rob Reiner as Sheldon Flender
- Stacey Nelkin as Rita
- Margaret Sophie Stein as Lili
- Mary-Louise Parker as Ellen
- Dianne Wiest as Helen Sinclair
- Harvey Fierstein as Sid Loomis
- Shannah Laumeister as Movie Theatre Victim
- Brian McConnachie as Mitch Sabine
- Edie Falco as Lorna
- Jim Broadbent as Warner Purcell
- Tracey Ullman as Eden Brent
- Debi Mazar as Violet "Vi"
- Tony Sirico as Rocco
- Tony Darrow as Aldo
- Benay Venuta as Theater Well-Wisher

== Soundtrack ==
- "Toot, Toot, Tootsie (Goo' Bye!)" – Written by Dan Russo, Ernie Erdman and Gus Kahn – Performed by Al Jolson with the Vitaphone Orchestra
- "Crazy Rhythm" – Lyrics by Irving Caesar – Music by Joseph Meyer (songwriter) & Roger Wolfe Kahn
- "You've Got to See Mamma Every Night or You Can't See Mamma at All" – Lyrics by Billy Rose – Music by Con Conrad
- "Make Believe" – Music by Jerome Kern – Lyrics by Oscar Hammerstein II – Performed by The Three Deuces Musicians
- "That Jungle Jamboree" – Written by Andy Razaf, Harry Brooks & Fats Waller – Performed by Duke Ellington
- "Lazy River" – Written by Hoagy Carmichael & Sidney Arodin – Performed by New Leviathan Oriental Fox Trot Orchestra
- "Nagasaki" – Music by Harry Warren – Lyrics by Mort Dixon
- "Let's Misbehave" – By Cole Porter – Performed by Irving Aaronson and his Commanders
- "You Took Advantage of Me" – Music by Richard Rodgers – Lyrics by Lorenz Hart
- "When the Red, Red Robin (Comes Bob, Bob, Bobbin' Along)" – Written by Harry M. Woods
- "Ma! He's Making Eyes at Me" – Lyrics by Sidney Clare – Music by Con Conrad – Performed by Eddie Cantor with Henri Rene and His Orchestra
- "Thou Swell" – Music by Richard Rodgers – Lyrics by Lorenz Hart
- "At the Jazz Band Ball" – Written by Nick LaRocca & Larry Shields – Performed by Bix Beiderbecke
- "Poor Butterfly" – Music by Raymond Hubbell – Lyrics by John Golden – Performed by Red Nichols and His Five Pennies
- "That Certain Feeling" – Music by George Gershwin – Lyrics by Ira Gershwin
- "Who" – Music by Jerome Kern – Lyrics by Otto A. Harbach & Oscar Hammerstein II – Performed by George Olsen

== Production ==
The film's locales include the duplex co-op on the 22nd floor of 5 Tudor City Place in Manhattan.

The film's title may have been an homage to a lengthy sketch of the same title from the 1950s television show Caesar's Hour; one of Allen's first jobs in television was writing for Sid Caesar specials after the initial run of the show.

The film featured the last screen appearance of Benay Venuta. Allen cast her in a cameo role as a well-wishing wealthy theatre patron. She died of lung cancer in September 1995.

== Reception ==
=== Critical response ===
Bullets Over Broadway received a positive response from critics. On the review aggregator website Rotten Tomatoes, the film holds an approval rating of 95% based on 60 reviews, with an average rating of 7.9/10. The website's critics consensus reads, "A gleefully entertaining backstage comedy, Bullets Over Broadway features some of Woody Allen's sharpest, most inspired late-period writing and direction."

Janet Maslin of The New York Times described the film as "a bright, energetic, sometimes side-splitting comedy with vital matters on its mind, precisely the kind of sharp-edged farce [Allen] has always done best." Todd McCarthy of Variety similarly called it "a backstage comedy bolstered by healthy shots of prohibition gangster melodrama and romantic entanglements" and wrote, "In its mixing of showbiz and gangsters, this is a nice companion piece to Allen's Broadway Danny Rose, and about as amusing." Roger Ebert of the Chicago Sun-Times praised, "Bullets Over Broadway shares a kinship with a more serious film by Allen, Crimes and Misdemeanors, in which a man committed murder and was able, somehow, to almost justify it. Now here is the comic side of the same coin. The movie is very funny and, in the way it follows its logic wherever it leads, surprisingly tough."

The film grossed $13.4 million in the United States and Canada and $24.1 million internationally for a worldwide total of $37.5 million.

== Awards and nominations ==
Award	Category	Nominee(s)	Result	Ref.
Academy Awards	Best Director	Woody Allen	Nominated	
Academy Awards	Best Supporting Actor	Chazz Palminteri	Nominated	
Academy Awards	Best Supporting Actress	Jennifer Tilly	Nominated	
Academy Awards	Best Supporting Actress	Dianne Wiest	Won	
Academy Awards	Best Screenplay – Written Directly for the Screen	Woody Allen and Douglas McGrath	Nominated	
Academy Awards	Best Art Direction	Art Direction: Santo Loquasto; Set Decoration: Susan Bode	Nominated	
Academy Awards	Best Costume Design	Jeffrey Kurland	Nominated	
American Comedy Awards	Funniest Supporting Actor in a Motion Picture	Chazz Palminteri	Nominated	
American Comedy Awards	Funniest Supporting Actress in a Motion Picture	Jennifer Tilly	Nominated	
American Comedy Awards	Funniest Supporting Actress in a Motion Picture	Tracey Ullman	Nominated	
American Comedy Awards	Funniest Supporting Actress in a Motion Picture	Dianne Wiest	Won	
Artios Awards	Outstanding Achievement in Feature Film Casting – Comedy	Juliet Taylor	Won	
Boston Society of Film Critics Awards	Best Supporting Actress	Tracey Ullman	3rd Place	
Boston Society of Film Critics Awards	Best Supporting Actress	Dianne Wiest	2nd Place	
British Academy Film Awards	Best Screenplay – Original	Woody Allen and Douglas McGrath	Nominated	
British Comedy Awards	Best Comedy Film		Won	
Chicago Film Critics Association Awards	Best Supporting Actor	Chazz Palminteri	Nominated	
Chicago Film Critics Association Awards	Best Supporting Actress	Dianne Wiest	Won	
Chlotrudis Awards	Best Movie		Nominated	
Chlotrudis Awards	Best Supporting Actress	Dianne Wiest	Won	
Dallas–Fort Worth Film Critics Association Awards	Best Supporting Actress	Dianne Wiest	Won	
Golden Globe Awards	Best Supporting Actress – Motion Picture	Dianne Wiest	Won	
Guldbagge Awards	Best Foreign Film	Woody Allen	Nominated	
Independent Spirit Awards	Best Feature		Nominated	
Independent Spirit Awards	Best Supporting Male	Chazz Palminteri	Won	
Independent Spirit Awards	Best Supporting Female	Dianne Wiest	Won	
Independent Spirit Awards	Best Screenplay	Woody Allen and Douglas McGrath	Nominated	
Kansas City Film Critics Circle Awards	Best Supporting Actress	Dianne Wiest	Won	
Los Angeles Film Critics Association Awards	Best Supporting Actress	Dianne Wiest	Won	
National Board of Review Awards	Top Ten Films		4th Place	
National Society of Film Critics Awards	Best Supporting Actress	Dianne Wiest	Won	
New York Film Critics Circle Awards	Best Supporting Actress	Dianne Wiest	Won	
Sant Jordi Awards	Best Foreign Actor	Chazz Palminteri (also for A Bronx Tale and The Usual Suspects)	Won	
Screen Actors Guild Awards	Outstanding Performance by a Male Actor in a Supporting Role	Chazz Palminteri	Nominated	
Screen Actors Guild Awards	Outstanding Performance by a Female Actor in a Supporting Role	Dianne Wiest	Won	
Society of Texas Film Critics Awards	Best Supporting Actress	Dianne Wiest	Won	
Southeastern Film Critics Association Awards	Best Supporting Actress	Dianne Wiest	Won	
Writers Guild of America Awards	Best Screenplay – Written Directly for the Screen	Woody Allen and Douglas McGrath	Nominated	

=== Year-end lists ===
- 4th – National Board of Review
- 4th – Glenn Lovell, San Jose Mercury News
- 4th – Sean P. Means, The Salt Lake Tribune
- 5th – Robert Denerstein, Rocky Mountain News
- 8th – Peter Travers, Rolling Stone
- 8th – Kevin Thomas, Los Angeles Times
- 8th – John Hurley, Staten Island Advance
- 10th – Yardena Arar, Los Angeles Daily News
- 11th – Janet Maslin, The New York Times
- Top 9 (not ranked) – Dan Webster, The Spokesman-Review
- Top 10 (listed alphabetically, not ranked) – Bob Ross, The Tampa Tribune
- Top 10 (not ranked) – Dennis King, Tulsa World
- Top 10 (not ranked) – Howie Movshovitz, The Denver Post
- Top 5 runners-up (not ranked) – Scott Schuldt, The Oklahoman
- Honorable mentions – Mike Clark, USA Today
- Honorable mention – Duane Dudek, Milwaukee Sentinel
- Honorable mention – Michael MacCambridge, Austin American-Statesman
- Guilty pleasure – Douglas Armstrong, The Milwaukee Journal

== Stage musical ==
Allen adapted the film as a stage jukebox musical, titled Bullets Over Broadway the Musical. The musical is directed and choreographed by Susan Stroman, produced by Julian Schlossberg and Allen's younger sister Letty Aronson, with a score from the American songbook using songs from the 1920s and 1930s. The new musical premiered on Broadway at the St. James Theatre on April 10, 2014. A staged reading was held in June 2013. The cast features Zach Braff as David Shayne, Brooks Ashmanskas, Betsy Wolfe, Lenny Wolpe, and Vincent Pastore. Marin Mazzie stars as Helen Sinclair, and Karen Ziemba appears as Eden Brent. Musical supervisor Glen Kelly has adapted and written additional lyrics for songs including "Tain't Nobody's Bus'ness", "Running Wild", "Let's Misbehave", and "I Found a New Baby". The musical closed on August 24, 2014, after 156 performances and 33 previews.
