= Sense and Sensibility (1995 film) =

1995 film by Ang Lee

- Theatrical release poster
- Directed by: Ang Lee
- Screenplay by: Emma Thompson
- Based on: Sense and Sensibility; 1811 novel by Jane Austen
- Produced by: Lindsay Doran
- Starring: Emma Thompson; Alan Rickman; Kate Winslet; Hugh Grant
- Cinematography: Michael Coulter
- Edited by: Tim Squyres
- Music by: Patrick Doyle
- Production companies: Columbia Pictures; Mirage Enterprises
- Distributed by: Sony Pictures Releasing
- Release dates: December 13, 1995 (United States); February 23, 1996 (United Kingdom)
- Running time: 136 minutes
- Countries: United States; United Kingdom
- Language: English
- Budget: $16 million
- Box office: $135 million

Sense and Sensibility is a 1995 period drama film directed by Ang Lee and based on the 1811 novel by Jane Austen. Emma Thompson wrote the screenplay and stars as Elinor Dashwood, while Kate Winslet plays Elinor's younger sister Marianne. The story follows the Dashwood sisters, members of a wealthy English family of landed gentry, as they must deal with circumstances of sudden destitution. They are forced to seek financial security through marriage. Hugh Grant and Alan Rickman play their suitors.

Producer Lindsay Doran, a long time admirer of Austen's novel, hired Thompson to write the screenplay. She spent five years drafting numerous revisions, continually working on the script between other films as well as into production of the film itself. Studios were nervous that Thompson—a first-time screenwriter—was the credited writer, but Columbia Pictures agreed to distribute the film. Though initially intending to have another actress portray Elinor, Thompson was persuaded to take the role. Thompson's screenplay exaggerated the Dashwood family's wealth to make their later scenes of poverty more apparent to modern audiences. It also altered the traits of the male leads to make them more appealing to contemporary viewers. Elinor and Marianne's different characteristics were emphasised through imagery and invented scenes. Lee was selected as director, both for his work in the 1993 film The Wedding Banquet and because Doran believed he would help the film appeal to a wider audience. Lee was given a budget of $16 million.

Sense and Sensibility was released on 13 December 1995, in the United States by Sony Pictures Releasing through its Columbia label. A commercial success, earning $135 million worldwide, the film garnered overwhelmingly positive reviews upon release and received many accolades, including three awards and eleven nominations at the 1995 British Academy Film Awards. It earned seven Academy Awards nominations, including for Best Picture and Best Actress. Thompson received the award for Best Adapted Screenplay, becoming the only person to have won Academy Awards for both acting and screenwriting. Sense and Sensibility contributed to a resurgence in popularity for Austen's works, and has led to many more productions in similar genres. It continues to be recognised as one of the best Austen adaptations of all time.

== Plot ==
When Henry Dashwood dies, his wife and three daughters—Elinor, Marianne and Margaret—are left with an inheritance of only £500 a year. The bulk of his estate, Norland Park, is left to his son, John, from his first marriage. John and his greedy, snobbish wife Fanny immediately install themselves in the large house; Fanny invites her brother, Edward Ferrars, to stay with them. She frets about the budding friendship between Edward and Elinor, believing he can do better, and does everything she can to prevent it from developing into a romantic attachment.

Sir John Middleton, a cousin of the widowed Mrs. Dashwood, offers her a small cottage house on his estate, Barton Park in Devonshire. She and her daughters move in and are frequent guests at Barton Park. Marianne meets the older Colonel Brandon, who falls in love with her at first sight. Competing for her affections is the dashing John Willoughby, with whom she falls in love. Later one morning she expects him to propose marriage to her, but he instead leaves hurriedly for London.

Sir John's mother-in-law, Mrs. Jennings, invites her daughter and son-in-law, Mr. and Mrs. Palmer, to visit. They bring with them the impoverished Lucy Steele. Lucy confides in Elinor that she and Edward have been engaged secretly for five years, thus dashing Elinor's hopes of a future with him. Mrs. Jennings takes Lucy, Elinor, and Marianne to London, where they meet Willoughby at a ball. He barely acknowledges their acquaintance, and they learn he has become engaged to the extremely wealthy Miss Grey. Marianne is inconsolable. Colonel Brandon then reveals that his ward Beth, illegitimate daughter of his former love Eliza, is pregnant with Willoughby's child and was abandoned by him; Willoughby's aunt, Lady Allen, had disinherited him upon discovering this. The engagement of Edward and Lucy also comes to light. Edward's mother demands that he break it off. When he honorably refuses, his fortune is taken from him and given to his younger brother, Robert.

On their way home to Devonshire, Elinor and Marianne stop for the night at the country estate of the Palmers, who live near Willoughby. Marianne cannot resist going to see Willoughby's estate and walks a long way in torrential rain to do so. As a result, she becomes seriously ill and is nursed back to health by Elinor after being rescued by Colonel Brandon. After Marianne recovers, the sisters return home. They learn that Lucy has become Mrs. Ferrars and assume that she married Edward. However, Edward arrives to explain that Lucy has in fact wed his now-wealthy brother Robert, and Edward is thus released from his engagement. Edward proposes to Elinor and becomes a vicar, while Marianne marries Colonel Brandon.

== Cast ==
- Emma Thompson as Elinor Dashwood
- Hugh Grant as Edward Ferrars
- Kate Winslet as Marianne Dashwood
- Alan Rickman as Colonel Brandon
- Imogen Stubbs as Lucy Steele
- Greg Wise as John Willoughby
- Gemma Jones as Mrs. Dashwood
- Harriet Walter as Fanny Dashwood
- James Fleet as John Dashwood
- Hugh Laurie as Mr. Palmer
- Imelda Staunton as Charlotte Palmer
- Robert Hardy as Sir John Middleton
- Elizabeth Spriggs as Mrs. Jennings
- Tom Wilkinson as Mr. Dashwood
- Emilie François as Margaret Dashwood
- Richard Lumsden as Robert Ferrars

== Production ==
=== Conception and adaptation ===
In 1989, Lindsay Doran, a producer of production company Mirage Enterprises, was on a company retreat brainstorming potential film ideas when she suggested the Jane Austen novel Sense and Sensibility to her colleagues. It had been adapted twice, most recently in a 1981 television serial. Doran was a longtime fan of the novel, and had vowed in her youth to adapt it if she ever entered the film industry. She chose to adapt this particular Austen work because there were two female leads. Doran stated that "all of [Austen's] books are funny and emotional, but Sense and Sensibility is the best movie story because it's full of twists and turns. Just when you think you know what's going on, everything is different. It's got real suspense, but it's not a thriller. Irresistible." She also praised the novel for possessing "wonderful characters ... three strong love stories, surprising plot twists, good jokes, relevant themes, and a heart-stopping ending."

Prior to being hired at Mirage, the producer had spent years looking for a suitable screenwriter – someone who was "equally strong in the areas of satire and romance" and could think in Austen's language "almost as naturally as he or she could think in the language of the twentieth century". Doran read screenplays by English and American writers until she came across a series of comedic skits, often in period settings, that actress Emma Thompson had written. Doran believed the humour and style of writing was "exactly what [she'd] been searching for". Thompson and Doran were already working together on Mirage's 1991 film Dead Again. A week after its completion, the producer selected Thompson to adapt Sense and Sensibility, although she knew that Thompson had never written a screenplay. Also a fan of Austen, Thompson first suggested they adapt Persuasion or Emma before agreeing to Doran's proposal. The actress found that Sense and Sensibility contained more action than she had remembered and decided it would translate well to drama.

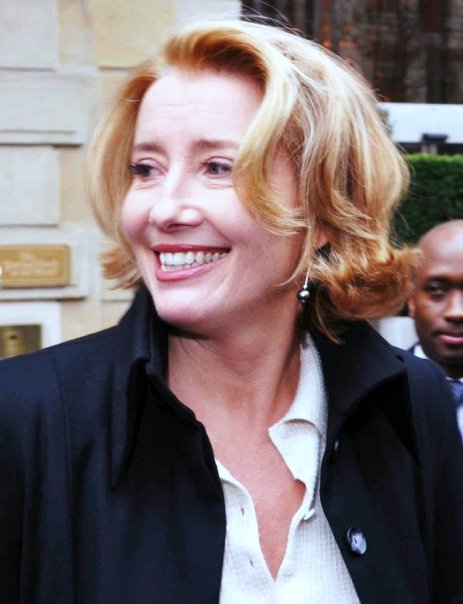
Emma Thompson worked on the Sense and Sensibility screenplay for five years.

Thompson spent five years writing and revising the screenplay, both during and between shooting other films. Believing the novel's language to be "far more arcane than in [Austen's] later books," Thompson sought to simplify the dialogue while retaining the "elegance and wit of the original." She observed that in a screenwriting process, a first draft often had "a lot of good stuff in it" but needed to be edited, and second drafts would "almost certainly be rubbish ... because you get into a panic". Thompson credited Doran that she could "help me, nourish me and mentor me through that process ... I learned about screenwriting at her feet".

Thompson's first draft was more than three hundred handwritten pages, which required her to reduce it to a more manageable length. She found the romances to be the most difficult to "juggle", and her draft received some criticism for the way it presented Willoughby and Edward. Doran later recalled the work was criticized for not getting underway until Willoughby's arrival, with Edward side-lined as backstory. Thompson and Doran quickly realised that "if we didn't meet Edward and do the work and take that twenty minutes to set up those people ... then it wasn't going to work". At the same time, Thompson wished to avoid depicting "a couple of women waiting around for men"; gradually her screenplay focused as much on the Dashwood sisters' relationship with each other as it did with their romantic interests.

With the draft screenplay, Doran pitched the idea to various studios in order to finance the film, but found that many were wary of the beginner Thompson as the screenwriter. She was considered a risk, as her experience was as an actress who had never written a film script. Columbia Pictures executive Amy Pascal supported Thompson's work and agreed to sign as the producer and distributor.

As Thompson mentioned on the BBC program QI in 2009, at one point in the writing process a computer failure almost lost the entire work. In panic Thompson called fellow actor and close friend Stephen Fry, the host of QI and a self-professed "geek". After seven hours, Fry was able to recover the documents from the device while Thompson had tea with Hugh Laurie who was at Fry's house at the time.

==== Lee's hire ====
Taiwanese director Ang Lee was hired as a result of his work in the 1993 family comedy film The Wedding Banquet, which he co-wrote, produced, and directed. He was not familiar with Jane Austen. Doran felt that Lee's films, which depicted complex family relationships amidst a social comedy context, were a good fit with Austen's storylines. She recalled, "The idea of a foreign director was intellectually appealing even though it was very scary to have someone who didn't have English as his first language." The producer sent Lee a copy of Thompson's script, to which he replied that he was "cautiously interested". Fifteen directors were interviewed, but according to Doran, Lee was one of the few who recognised Austen's humour. He also told them he wanted the film to "break people's hearts so badly that they'll still be recovering from it two months later."

In some ways I probably know that nineteenth century world better than English people today, because I grew up with one foot still in that feudal society. Of course, the dry sense of humour, the sense of decorum, the social code is different. But the essence of social repression against free will – I grew up with that.

— Ang Lee

From the beginning, Doran wanted Sense and Sensibility to appeal to both a core audience of Austen aficionados as well as younger viewers attracted to romantic comedy films. She felt that Lee's involvement prevented the film from becoming "just some little English movie" that appealed only to local audiences instead of to the wider world. Lee said,

I thought they were crazy: I was brought up in Taiwan, what do I know about 19th-century England? About halfway through the script it started to make sense why they chose me. In my films I've been trying to mix social satire and family drama. I realised that all along I had been trying to do Jane Austen without knowing it. Jane Austen was my destiny. I just had to overcome the cultural barrier.

Because Thompson and Doran had worked on the screenplay for so long, Lee described himself at the time as a "director for hire", as he was unsure of his role and position. He spent six months in England "learn[ing] how to make this movie, how to do a period film, culturally ... and how to adapt to the major league film industry".

In January 1995, Thompson presented a draft to Lee, Doran, co-producer Laurie Borg, and others working on the production, and spent the next two months editing the screenplay based upon their feedback. Thompson continued making revisions throughout production of the film, including altering scenes to meet budgetary concerns, adding dialogue changes, and changing certain aspects to better fit the actors. Brandon's confession scene, for instance, initially included flashbacks and stylised imagery before Thompson decided it was "emotionally more interesting to let Brandon tell the story himself and find it difficult".

=== Casting ===
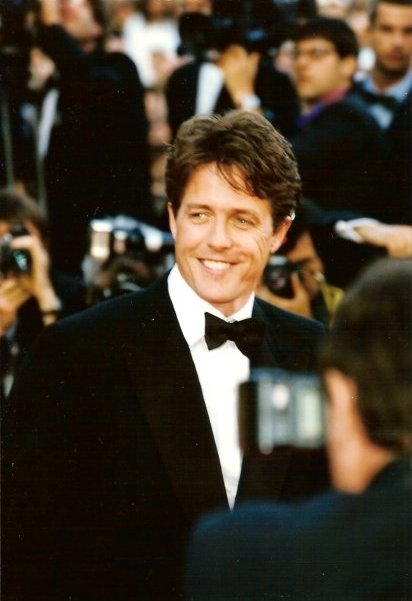
Hugh Grant, who had worked with Thompson in several films, was her first choice to play Edward Ferrars.

Thompson initially hoped that Doran would cast sisters Natasha and Joely Richardson as Elinor and Marianne Dashwood. Lee and Columbia wanted Thompson herself, now a "big-deal movie star" after her critically successful role in the 1992 film Howards End, to play Elinor. The actress replied that at the age of thirty-five, she was too old for the nineteen-year-old character. Lee suggested Elinor's age be changed to twenty-seven, which would also have made the difficult reality of spinsterhood easier for modern audiences to understand. Thompson agreed, later stating that she was "desperate to get into a corset and act it and stop thinking about it as a script."

The formal casting process began in February 1995, though some of the actors met with Thompson the previous year to help her conceptualise the script. Lee eventually cast all but one of them: Hugh Grant (as Edward Ferrars), Robert Hardy (as Sir John Middleton), Harriet Walter (as Fanny Ferrars Dashwood), Imelda Staunton (as Charlotte Jennings Palmer), and Hugh Laurie (as Mr. Palmer). Amanda Root had also worked with Thompson on the screenplay, but had already committed to star in the 1995 film Persuasion. Commenting on the casting of Laurie, whom she had known for years, Thompson has said, "There is no one [else] on the planet who could capture Mr. Palmer's disenchantment and redemption so perfectly, and make it funny."

Thompson wrote the part of Edward Ferrars with Grant in mind, and he agreed to receive a lower salary in line with the film's budget. Grant called her screenplay "genius", explaining "I've always been a philistine about Jane Austen herself, and I think Emma's script is miles better than the book and much more amusing." Grant's casting was criticised by the Jane Austen Society of North America (JASNA), whose representatives said that he was too handsome for the part. Actress Kate Winslet initially intended to audition for the role of Marianne but Lee disliked her work in the 1994 drama film Heavenly Creatures; she auditioned for the lesser part of Lucy Steele. Winslet pretended she had heard that the audition was still for Marianne, and won the part based on a single reading. Thompson later said that Winslet, only nineteen years old, approached the part "energised and open, realistic, intelligent, and tremendous fun." The role helped Winslet become recognised as a significant actress.

Also appearing in the film was Alan Rickman, who portrayed Colonel Brandon. Thompson was pleased that Rickman could express the "extraordinary sweetness [of] his nature," as he had played "Machiavellian types so effectively" in other films. Greg Wise was cast as Marianne's other romantic interest, John Willoughby, his most noted role thus far. Twelve-year-old Emilie François, appearing as Margaret Dashwood, was one of the last people cast in the production; she had no professional acting experience. Thompson praised the young actress in her production diaries, "Emilie has a natural quick intelligence that informs every movement – she creates spontaneity in all of us just by being there." Other cast members included Gemma Jones as Mrs. Dashwood, James Fleet as John Dashwood, Elizabeth Spriggs as Mrs. Jennings, Imogen Stubbs as Lucy Steele, Richard Lumsden as Robert Ferrars, Tom Wilkinson as Mr. Dashwood, and Lone Vidahl as Miss Grey.

=== Costume design ===
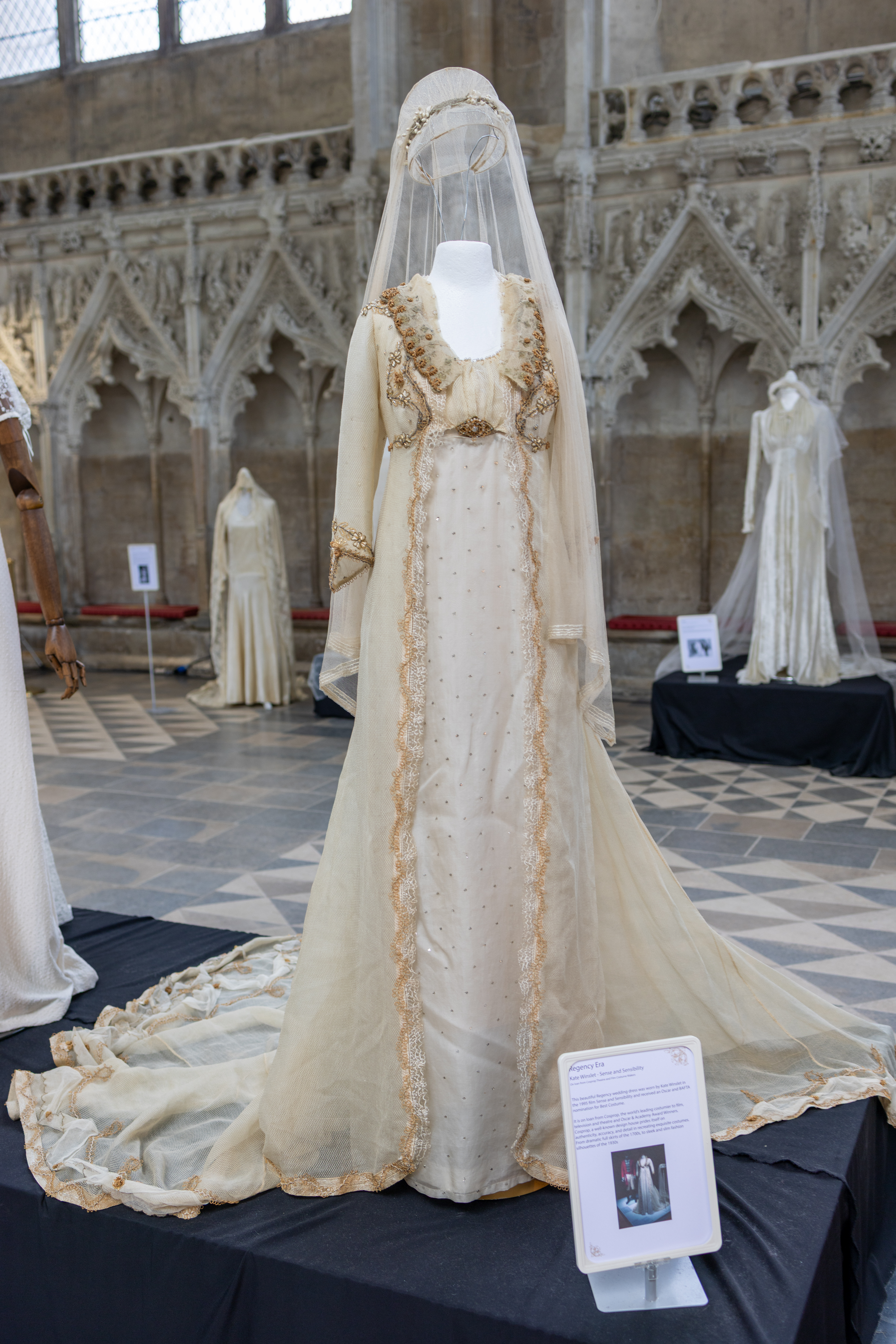
Wedding dress worn by Kate Winslet as Marianne Dashwood

According to Austen scholar Linda Troost, the costumes used in Sense and Sensibility helped emphasise the class and status of the various characters, particularly among the Dashwoods. They were created by Jenny Beavan and John Bright, a team of designers best known for Merchant Ivory films who began working together in 1984. The two attempted to create accurate period dress, and featured the "fuller, classical look and colours of the late 18th century." They found inspiration in the works of the English artists Thomas Rowlandson, John Hopper, and George Romney, and also reviewed fashion plates stored in the Victoria and Albert Museum. The main costumes and hats were manufactured at Cosprop, a London-based costumer company.

To achieve the tightly wound curls fashionably inspired by Greek art, some of the actresses wore wigs while others employed heated hair twists and slept in pin curls. Fanny, the snobbiest of the characters, possesses the tightest of curls but has less of a Greek silhouette, a reflection of her wealth and silliness. Beavan stated that Fanny and Mrs. Jennings "couldn't quite give up the frills," and instead draped themselves in lace, fur, feathers, jewellery, and rich fabrics. Conversely, sensible Elinor opts for simpler accessories, such as a long gold chain and a straw hat. Fanny's shallow personality is also reflected in "flashy, colourful" dresses, while Edward's buttoned-up appearance represents his "repressed" personality, with little visible skin. Each of the 100 extras used in the London ballroom scene, depicting "soldiers and lawyers to fops and dowagers," don visually distinct costumes.

For Brandon's costumes, Beavan and Bright consulted with Thompson and Lee and decided to have him project an image of "experienced and dependable masculinity." Brandon is first seen in black, but later he wears sporting gear in the form of corduroy jackets and shirtsleeves. His rescue of Marianne has him transforming into the "romantic Byronic hero", sporting an unbuttoned shirt and loose cravat. In conjunction with his tragic backstory, Brandon's "flattering" costumes help his appeal to the audience. Beavan and Bright's work on the film earned them a nomination for Best Costume Design at the 68th Academy Awards.

=== Filming ===
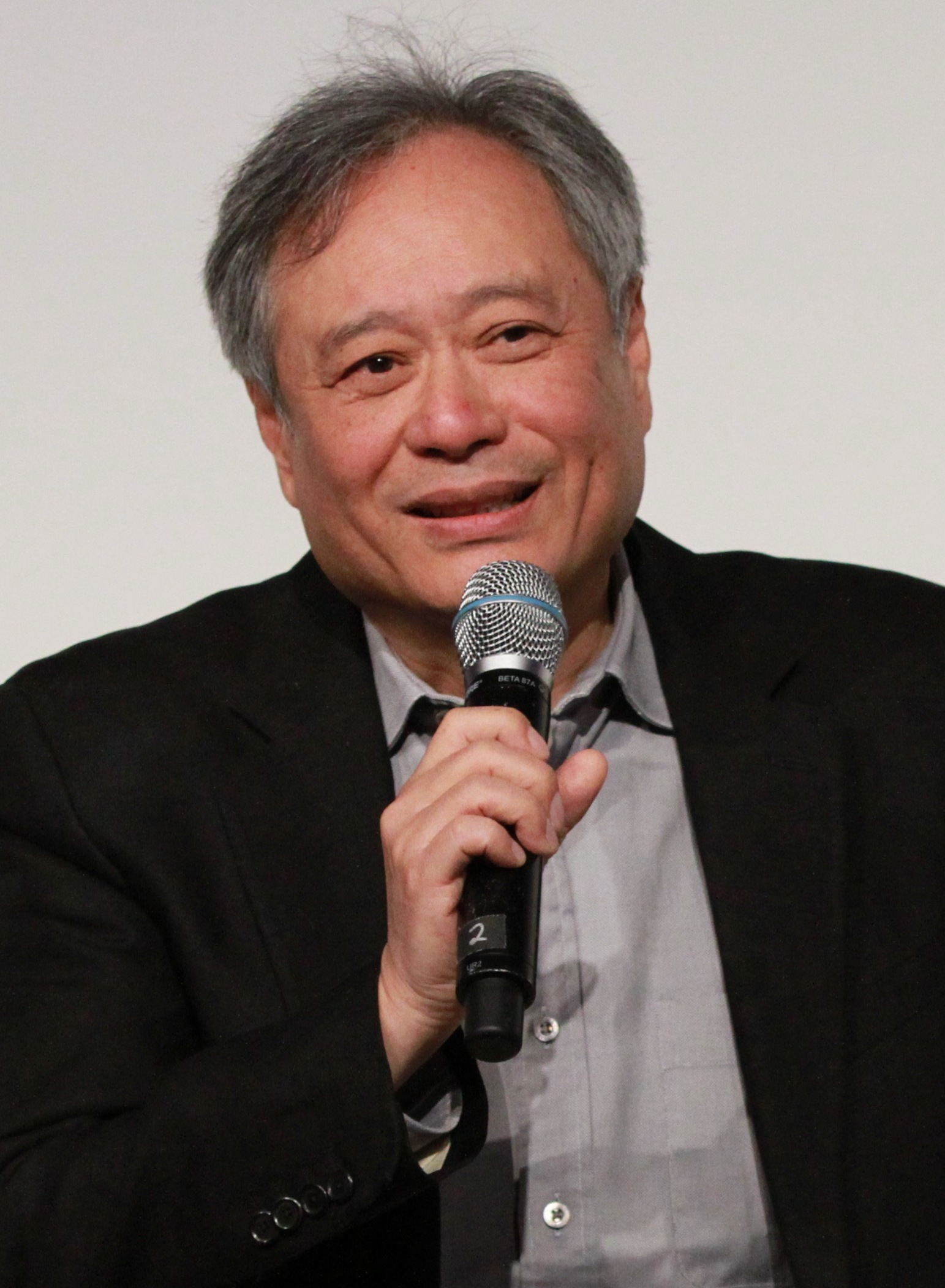
Sense and Sensibility was Ang Lee's first feature film outside of Asia.

The film was budgeted at $16 million, the largest Ang Lee had yet received as well as the largest awarded to an Austen film that decade. In the wake of the success of Columbia's 1994 film Little Women, the American studio authorised Lee's "relatively high budget" out of an expectation that it would be another cross-over hit and appeal to multiple audiences, thus yielding high box office returns. Nevertheless, Doran considered it a "low budget film", and many of the ideas Thompson and Lee came up with – such as an early dramatic scene depicting Mr. Dashwood's bloody fall from a horse – were deemed unfilmable from a cost perspective.

According to Thompson, Lee "arrived on set with the whole movie in his head". Rather than focus on period details, he wanted the film to concentrate on telling a good story. He showed the cast a selection of films adapted from classic novels, including Barry Lyndon and The Age of Innocence, which he believed to be "great movies; everybody worships the art work, [but] it's not what we want to do". Lee criticised the latter film for lacking energy, in contrast to the "passionate tale" of Sense and Sensibility.

The cast and crew experienced "slight culture shock" with Lee on a number of occasions. He expected the assistant directors to be the "tough ones" and keep production on schedule, while they expected the same of him; this led to a slower schedule in the early stages of production. Additionally, according to Thompson, the director became "deeply hurt and confused" when she and Grant made suggestions for certain scenes, which was something that was not done in his native country. Lee thought his authority was being undermined and lost sleep, though this was gradually resolved as he became used to their methods. The cast "grew to trust his instincts so completely", making fewer and fewer suggestions. Co-producer James Schamus stated that Lee also adapted by becoming more verbal and willing to express his opinion.

Lee became known for his "frightening" tendency not to "mince words". He often had the cast do numerous takes for a scene to get the perfect shot, and was not afraid to call something "boring" if he disliked it. Thompson later recalled that Lee would "always come up to you and say something unexpectedly crushing", such as asking her not to "look so old". She also commented, however, that "he doesn't indulge us but is always kind when we fail". Due to Thompson's extensive acting experience, Lee encouraged her to practice tai chi to "help her relax [and] make her do things simpler". Other actors soon joined them in meditating – according to Doran, it "was pretty interesting. There were all these pillows on the floor and these pale-looking actors were saying, 'What have we got ourselves into?' [Lee] was more focused on body language than any director I've ever seen or heard of." He suggested Winslet read books of poetry and report back to him to best understand her character. He also had Thompson and Winslet live together to develop their characters' sisterly bond. Many of the cast took lessons in etiquette and riding side-saddle.

Lee found that in contrast to Chinese cinema, he had to dissuade many of the actors from using a "very stagy, very English tradition. Instead of just being observed like a human being and getting sympathy, they feel they have to do things, they have to carry the movie." Grant in particular often had to be restrained from giving an "over-the-top" performance; Lee later recalled that the actor is "a show stealer. You can't stop that. I let him do, I have to say, less 'star' stuff, the Hugh Grant thing ... and not [let] the movie serve him, which is probably what he's used to now." For the scene in which Elinor learns Edward is unmarried, Thompson found inspiration from her reaction to her father's death. Grant was unaware that Thompson would cry through most of his speech, and the actress attempted to reassure him, "'There's no other way, and I promise you it'll work, and it will be funny as well as being touching.' And he said, 'Oh, all right,' and he was very good about it." Lee had one demand for the scene, that Thompson avoid the temptation to turn her head towards the camera.

==== Locations ====
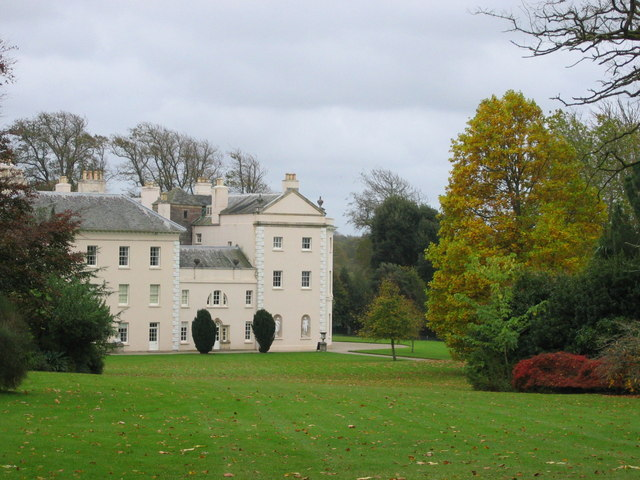

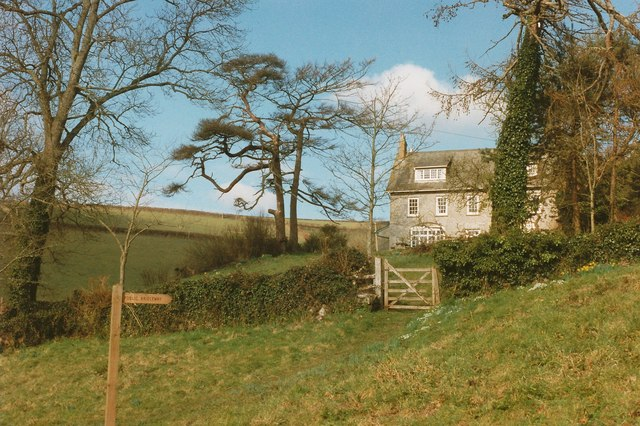
Above: Saltram House, a National Trust property, stood in for Norland Park
Below: Efford House in Holbeton was used as Barton Cottage

Production of Sense and Sensibility was scheduled for fifty-eight days, though this was eventually extended to sixty-five. Filming commenced in mid-April 1995 at a number of locations in Devon, beginning with Saltram House (standing in for Norland Park), where Winslet and Jones shot the first scene of the production: when their characters read about Barton Cottage. As Saltram was a National Trust property, Schamus had to sign a contract before production began, and staff with the organisation remained on set to carefully monitor the filming. Production later returned to shoot several more scenes, finishing there on 29 April. The second location of filming, Flete House, stood in for part of Mrs. Jennings' London estate, where Edward first sees Elinor with Lucy. Representing Barton Cottage was a Flete Estate stone cottage called Efford House in Holbeton, which Thompson called "one of the most beautiful spots we've ever seen."

Early May saw production at the "exquisite" St Mary's Church in Berry Pomeroy for the final wedding scene. From the tenth to the twelfth of May, Marianne's first rescue sequence, depicting her encounter with Willoughby, was shot. Logistics were difficult, as the scene was set upon a hill during a rainy day. Lee shot around fifty takes, with the actors becoming soaked under rain machines; this led to Winslet eventually collapsing from hypothermia. Further problems occurred midway through filming, when Winslet contracted phlebitis in her leg, developed a limp, and sprained her wrist after falling down a staircase.

From May to July, production took place at a number of other National Trust estates and stately homes across England. Trafalgar House and Wilton House in Wiltshire stood in for the grounds of Barton Park and the London Ballroom respectively. Mompesson House, an eighteenth-century townhouse located in Salisbury, represented Mrs. Jennings' sumptuous townhouse. Sixteenth-century Montacute House in Somerset was the setting for the Palmer estate of Cleveland House. Further scenes were shot at Compton Castle in Devon (Mr Willoughby's estate) and at the National Maritime Museum in Greenwich.

=== Music ===
Composer Patrick Doyle, who had previously worked with his friend Emma Thompson in the films Henry V, Much Ado About Nothing, and Dead Again, was hired to produce the music for Sense and Sensibility. Asked by the director to select existing music or compose new "gentle" melodies, Doyle wrote a score that reflected the film's events. He explained, "You had this middle-class English motif, and with the music you would have occasional outbursts of emotion." Doyle explains that the score "becomes a little more grown-up" as the story progresses to one of "maturity and an emotional catharsis." The score contains romantic elements and has been described by National Public Radio as a "restricted compass ... of emotion" with "instruments [that] blend together in a gentle sort of way". They also noted that as a reflection of the story, the score is a "little wistful ... and sentimental."

Two songs are sung by Marianne in the film, with lyrics adapted from seventeenth-century poems. Lee believed that the two songs conveyed the "vision of duality" visible both in the novel and script. In his opinion, the second song expressed Marianne's "mature acceptance," intertwined with a "sense of melancholy". The melody of "Weep You No More Sad Fountains", Marianne's first song, appears in the opening credits, while her second song's melody features again during the ending credits, this time sung by dramatic soprano Jane Eaglen. The songs were written by Doyle before filming began. The composer received his first Academy Award nomination for his score.

=== Editing ===
Thompson and Doran discussed how much of the love stories to depict, as the male characters spend much of the novel away from the Dashwood sisters. The screenwriter had to carefully balance the amount of screentime she gave to the male leads, noting in her film production diary that such a decision would "very much lie in the editing." Thompson wrote "hundreds of different versions" of romantic storylines. She considered having Edward re-appear midway through the film before deciding that it would not work as "there was nothing for him to do." Thompson also opted to exclude the duel scene between Brandon and Willoughby, which is described in the novel, because it "only seemed to subtract from the mystery." She and Doran agonised about when and how to reveal Brandon's backstory, as they wanted to prevent viewers from becoming bored. Thompson described the process of reminding audiences of Edward and Brandon as "keeping plates spinning".

A scene was shot of Brandon finding his ward in a poverty-stricken area in London, but this was excluded from the film. Thompson's script included a scene of Elinor and Edward kissing, as the studio "couldn't stand the idea of these two people who we've been watching all the way through not kissing." It was one of the first scenes cut during editing: the original version was over three hours, Lee was less interested in the story's romance, and Thompson found a kissing scene to be inappropriate. The scene was included in marketing materials and the film trailer. Thompson and Doran also cut out a scene depicting Willoughby as remorseful when Marianne is sick. Doran said that despite it "being one of the great scenes in book history," they could not get it to fit into the film.

Tim Squyres edited the film, his fourth collaboration with Ang Lee. He reflected in 2013 about the editing process:

It was the first film that I had done with Ang that was all in English, and it's Emma Thompson, Kate Winslet, Alan Rickman, and Hugh Grant — these great, great actors. When you get footage like that, you realise that your job is really not technical. It was my job to look at something that Emma Thompson had done and say, "Eh, that's not good, I'll use this other one instead." And not only was I allowed to pass judgment on these tremendous actors, I was required to.

== Themes and analysis ==
=== Changes from source material ===
Scholar Louise Flavin has noted that Thompson's screenplay contains significant alterations to the characters of Elinor and Marianne Dashwood: in the novel, Elinor embodies "sense", i.e. "sensible" in our terms, and Marianne, "sensibility", i.e. "sensitivity" in our terms. Audience members are meant to view self-restrained Elinor as the person in need of reform, rather than her impassioned sister. To heighten the contrast between them, Marianne and Willoughby's relationship includes an "erotic" invented scene in which he requests a lock of her hair – a direct contrast to Elinor's "reserved relationship" with Edward. Lee also distinguishes them through imagery – Marianne is often seen with musical instruments, near open windows, and outside, while Elinor is pictured in door frames. Another character altered for modern viewers is Margaret Dashwood, who conveys "the frustrations that a girl of our times might feel at the limitations facing her as a woman in the early nineteenth century." Thompson uses Margaret for exposition in order to detail contemporary attitudes and customs. For instance, Elinor explains to a curious Margaret – and by extension, the audience – why their half-brother inherits the Dashwood estate. Margaret's altered storyline, giving her an interest in fencing and geography, also allows audience members to see the "feminine" side of Edward and Brandon, as they become father or brother figures to her. The film omits the characters of Lady Middleton and her children, as well as that of Ann Steele, Lucy's sister.

"The changes that Emma Thompson's screenplay makes to the male characters, if anything, allow them to be less culpable, more likeable, and certainly less sexist or patriarchal."

— Austen scholar Devoney Looser

When adapting the characters for film, Thompson found that in the novel, "Edward and Brandon are quite shadowy and absent for long periods," and that "making the male characters effective was one of the biggest problems. Willoughby is really the only male who springs out in three dimensions." Several major male characters in Sense and Sensibility were consequently altered significantly from the novel in an effort to appeal to contemporary audiences. Grant's Edward and Rickman's Brandon are "ideal" modern males who display an obvious love of children as well as "pleasing manners", especially when contrasted with Palmer. Thompson's script both expanded and omitted scenes from Edward's storyline, including the deletion of an early scene in which Elinor assumes that a lock of hair found in Edward's possession is hers, when it belongs to Lucy. He was made more fully realised and honourable than in the novel to increase his appeal to viewers. To gradually show viewers why Brandon is worthy of Marianne's love, Thompson's screenplay has his storyline mirroring Willoughby's; they are similar in appearance, share a love of music and poetry, and rescue Marianne in the rain while on horseback.

=== Class ===
Thompson viewed the novel as a story of "love and money," noting that some people needed one more than the other. During the writing process, executive producer Sydney Pollack stressed that the film be understandable to modern audiences, and that it be made clear why the Dashwood sisters could not just obtain a job. "I'm from Indiana; if I get it, everyone gets it," he said. Thompson believed that Austen was just as comprehensible in a different century, "You don't think people are still concerned with marriage, money, romance, finding a partner?" She was keen to emphasise the realism of the Dashwoods' predicament in her screenplay, and inserted scenes to make the differences in wealth more apparent to modern audiences. Thompson made the Dashwood family richer than in the book and added elements to help contrast their early wealth with their later financial predicament; for instance, because it might have been confusing to viewers that one could be poor and still have servants, Elinor is made to address a large group of servants at Norland Park early in the film for viewers to remember when they see their few staff at Barton Cottage. Lee also sought to emphasise social class and the limitations it placed on the protagonists. Lee conveys this in part when Willoughby publicly rejects Marianne; he returns to a more lavishly furnished room, a symbol of the wealth she has lost. "Family dramas," he stated, "are all about conflict, about family obligations versus free will."

The film's theme of class has attracted much scholarly attention. Carole Dole noted that class constitutes an important element in Austen's stories and is "impossible" to avoid when adapting her novels. According to Dole, Lee's film contains an "ambiguous treatment of class values" that stresses social differences but "underplays the consequences of the class distinctions so important in the novel"; for instance, Edward's story ends upon his proposal to Elinor, with no attention paid to how they will live on his small annual income from the vicarage. Louise Flavin believed that Lee used the houses to represent their occupants' class and character: the Dashwood sisters' decline in eligibility is represented through the contrast between the spacious rooms of Norland Park and those of the isolated, cramped Barton Cottage. James Thompson criticised what he described as the anaesthetised "mélange of disconnected picture postcard-gift-calendar-perfect scenes," in which little connection is made between "individual subjects and the land that supports them." Andrew Higson argued that while Sense and Sensibility includes commentary on sex and gender, it fails to pursue issues of class. Thompson's script, he wrote, displays a "sense of impoverishment [but is] confined to the still privileged lifestyle of the disinherited Dashwoods. The broader class system is pretty much taken for granted." The ending visual image of flying gold coins, depicted during Marianne's wedding, has also drawn attention; Marsha McCreadie noted that it serves as a "visual wrap-up and emblem of the merger between money and marriage."

=== Gender ===
Gender has been seen as another major theme of the film, often intersecting with class. Penny Gay observed that Elinor's early dialogue with Edward about "feel[ing] idle and useless ... [with] no hope whatsoever of any occupation" reflected Thompson's background as a "middle class, Cambridge-educated feminist." Conversely, Dole wrote that Thompson's version of Elinor "has a surprising anti-feminist element to it," as she appears more dependent on men than the original character; the film presents her as repressed, resulting in her emotional breakdown with Edward. Linda Troost opined that Lee's production prominently features "radical feminist and economic issues" while "paradoxically endorsing the conservative concept of marriage as a woman's goal in life." Despite this "mixed political agenda," Troost believed that the film's faithfulness to the traditional heritage film genre is evident through its use of locations, costumes, and attention to details, all of which also emphasize class and status. Gay and Julianne Pidduck stated that gender differences are expressed by showing the female characters indoors, while their male counterparts are depicted outside confidently moving throughout the countryside. Nora Stovel observed that Thompson "emphasises Austen's feminist satire on Regency gender economics," drawing attention not only to the financial plight of the Dashwoods but also to eighteenth-century women in general.

== Marketing and release ==
In the United States, Sony and Columbia Pictures released Sense and Sensibility on a slow schedule compared to mainstream films, first premiering it on 13 December 1995. Believing that a limited release would both position the film as an "exclusive quality picture" and increase its chances of winning Academy Awards, Columbia dictated that its first weekend involve only seventy cinemas in the US; it opened in eleventh place in terms of box office takings and earned $721,341. To benefit from the publicity surrounding potential Academy Award candidates and increase its chance of earning nominations, the film was released within "Oscar season". The number of theatres showing Sense and Sensibility was slowly expanded, with particular surges when its seven Oscar nominations were announced and at the time of the ceremony in late March, until it was present in over one thousand cinemas across the US. By the end of its American release, Sense and Sensibility had been watched by more than eight million people, garnering an "impressive" total domestic gross of $43,182,776.

On the basis of Austen's reputation as a serious author, the producers were able to rely on high-brow publications to help market their film. Near the time of its US release, large spreads in The New York Review of Books, Vanity Fair, Film Comment, and other media outlets featured columns on Lee's production. In late December, Time magazine declared it and Persuasion to be the best films of 1995. Andrew Higson referred to all this media exposure as a "marketing coup" because it meant the film "was reaching one of its target audiences." Meanwhile, most promotional images featured the film as a "sort of chick flick in period garb." New Market Press published Thompson's screenplay and film diary; in its first printing, the hard cover edition sold 28,500 copies in the US. British publisher Bloomsbury released a paperback edition of the novel containing film pictures, same title design, and the cast's names on the cover, while Signet Publishing in the US printed 250,000 copies instead of the typical 10,000 a year; actress Julie Christie read the novel in an audiobook released by Penguin Audiobooks. Sense and Sensibility increased dramatically in terms of its book sales, ultimately hitting tenth place on The New York Times Best Seller list for paperbacks in February 1996.

In the United Kingdom, Sense and Sensibility was released on 23 February 1996 in order to "take advantage of the hype from Pride and Prejudice", another popular Austen adaptation recently broadcast. Columbia Tristar's head of UK marketing noted that "if there was any territory this film was going to work, it was in the UK." After receiving positive responses at previews, marketing strategies focused on selling it as both a costume drama and as a film attractive to mainstream audiences. Attention was also paid to marketing Sense and Sensibility internationally. Because the entire production cycle had consistently emphasised it as being "bigger" than a normal British period drama literary film, distributors avoided labelling it as "just another English period film." Instead, marketing materials featured quotations from populist newspapers such as the Daily Mail, which compared the film to Four Weddings and a Funeral (1994). It opened in the UK on 102 screens and grossed £629,152 in its opening weekend, placing fourth at the box office. It went on to gross £13,605,627 in the UK, the seventh highest-grossing film for the year. It was watched by more than ten million viewers in Europe. Worldwide, the film ultimately grossed $134,582,776, a sum that reflected its commercial success. It had the largest box office gross out of the Austen adaptations of the 1990s.

A 4K restoration was released in the United Kingdom and Ireland on 8 August 2025 by Park Circus to celebrate its 30th anniversary. Internationally, it was given a limited release in North America from December 14, 16–17, 2025.

== Reception ==
=== Critical response ===
"This Sense And Sensibility is stamped indelibly by Ang Lee's characteristically restrained direction ... Although somewhat older than one might expect Elinor to be, Emma Thompson invests the character with a touching vulnerability, while Kate Winslet, who made such an eye catching debut in Heavenly Creatures last year, perfectly catches the confusions within the idealistically romantic but betrayed Marianne."

— Michael Dwyer in a review for The Irish Times

Sense and Sensibility received widespread critical acclaim, and was included on more than a hundred top-ten-of-the-year lists. On Rotten Tomatoes, the film has a 97% approval rating based on 139 reviews. The website's consensus reads, "Sense and Sensibility is an uncommonly deft, very funny Jane Austen adaptation, marked by Emma Thompson's finely tuned performance." On Metacritic, the film has an average score of 84 out of 100 based on 21 reviews, indicating "universal acclaim". Audiences polled by CinemaScore gave the film a grade "A" on scale of A to F.

Writing for Variety magazine, Todd McCarthy observed that the film's success was assisted by its "highly skilled cast of actors", as well as its choice of Lee as director. McCarthy clarified, "Although [Lee's] previously revealed talents for dramatizing conflicting social and generational traditions will no doubt be noted, Lee's achievement here with such foreign material is simply well beyond what anyone could have expected and may well be posited as the cinematic equivalent of Kazuo Ishiguro writing The Remains of the Day."

Mick LaSalle of the San Francisco Chronicle lauded the film for containing a sense of urgency "that keeps the pedestrian problems of an unremarkable 18th century family immediate and personal." LaSalle concluded that the adaptation has a "right balance of irony and warmth. The result is a film of great understanding and emotional clarity, filmed with an elegance that never calls attention to itself." Film critic John Simon praised most of the film, particularly focusing on Thompson's performance, though he criticised Grant for being "much too adorably bumbling ... he urgently needs to chasten his onscreen persona, and stop hunching his shoulders like a dromedary." Other major critics such as LaSalle, Roger Ebert, James Berardinelli and Janet Maslin praised Grant's performance. Maslin wrote, Grant "rises touchingly to the film's most straightforward and meaningful encounters."

Jay Carr of The Boston Globe thought that Lee "nail[ed] Austen's acute social observation and tangy satire," and viewed Thompson and Winslet's age discrepancy as a positive element that helped feed the dichotomy of sense and sensibility. The Radio Times' David Parkinson was equally appreciative of Lee's direction, writing that he "avoid[s] the chocolate-box visuals that cheapen so many British costume dramas" and "brings a refreshing period realism to the tale of two sisters that allows Emma Thompson's respectful Oscar-winning script to flourish."

Although as others have pointed out, the adaptation is not faithful to Austen's novel: "Thompson plays fast and loose with Austen, cutting huge chunks out of the novel, adding whole scenes; a mere six or seven lines from the book actually make it into the film".

=== Accolades ===
Out of the 1990s Austen adaptations, Sense and Sensibility received the most recognition from Hollywood. It garnered seven nominations at the 68th Academy Awards ceremony, where Thompson received the Award for Best Screenplay Based on Material Previously Produced or Published, making her the only person to have won an Oscar for both her writing and acting (Thompson won the Best Actress award for Howards End, in 1993). The film also was the recipient of twelve nominations at the 49th British Academy Film Awards, including Best Film, Best Actress in a Leading Role (for Thompson), and Best Actress in a Supporting Role (for Winslet). In addition, the film won the Golden Bear at the 46th Berlin International Film Festival, making Lee the first director to win this twice.

Despite the recognition given to the film, Lee was not nominated for the Academy Award for Best Director (though he was nominated for the Golden Globe, the BAFTA and the Directors Guild Award). The scholar Shu-mei Shih and the journalist Clarence Page have attributed this snub to Hollywood's racism against Lee, and Chinese cinema in general. Lee sought to avoid turning his omission into a controversy, asking the Taiwan state media not to make it a "national issue", explaining that he endured more pressure when forced to act as his country's representative.

== Legacy and influence ==
Following the theatrical release of Persuasion by a few months, Sense and Sensibility was one of the first English-language period adaptations of an Austen novel to be released in cinemas in over fifty years, the previous being the 1940 film Pride and Prejudice. The year 1995 saw a resurgence of popularity for Austen's works, as Sense and Sensibility and the serial Pride and Prejudice both rocketed to critical and financial success. The two adaptations helped draw more attention to the previously little-known 1995 television film Persuasion, and led to additional Austen adaptations in the following years. In 1995 and 1996, six Austen adaptations were released onto film or television. The filming of these productions led to a surge in popularity of many of the landmarks and locations depicted; according to the scholar Sue Parrill, they became "instant meccas for viewers."

When Sense and Sensibility was released in cinemas in the US, Town & Country published a six-page article entitled "Jane Austen's England", which focused on the landscape and sites shown in the film. A press book released by the studio, as well as Thompson's published screenplay and diaries, listed all the filming locations and helped to boost tourism. Saltram House for instance was carefully promoted during the film's release, and saw a 57 percent increase in attendance. In 1996, JASNA's membership increased by fifty percent. The popularity of both Sense and Sensibility and Pride and Prejudice led to the BBC and ITV releasing their Austen adaptations from the 1970s and 1980s onto DVD.

As the mid-1990s included adaptations of four Austen novels, there were few other of her works to adapt. Andrew Higson argues that this resulted in a "variety of successors" in the genres of romantic comedy and costume drama, as well as with films featuring strong female characters. Cited examples include Mrs Dalloway (1997), Mrs. Brown (1997), Shakespeare in Love (1998), and Bridget Jones's Diary (2001). In 2008, Andrew Davies, the screenwriter of Pride and Prejudice, adapted Sense and Sensibility for television. As a reaction to what he said was Lee's overly "sentimental" film, this production features events found in the novel but excluded from Thompson's screenplay, such as Willoughby's seduction of Eliza and his duel with Brandon. It also features actors closer to the ages in the source material.

Sense and Sensibility has maintained its popularity into the twenty-first century. In 2004, Louise Flavin referred to the 1995 film as "the most popular of the Austen film adaptations," and in 2008, The Independent ranked it as the third-best Austen adaptation of all time, opining that Lee "offered an acute outsider's insight into Austen in this compelling 1995 interpretation of the book [and] Emma Thompson delivered a charming turn as the older, wiser, Dashwood sister, Elinor." Journalist Zoe Williams credits Thompson as the person most responsible for Austen's popularity, explaining in 2007 that Sense and Sensibility "is the definitive Austen film and that's largely down to her." In 2011, The Guardian film critic Paul Laity named it his favourite film of all time, partly because of its "exceptional screenplay, crisply and skilfully done." Devoney Looser reflected on the film in The Atlantic on the 20th anniversary of its release, arguing that the film served as "a turning point" for "pro-feminist masculinity" in Austen adaptations.

== See also ==
- Jane Austen in popular culture
- Styles and themes of Jane Austen

== Bibliography ==
- Brownstein, Rachel M (2001). "Out of the Drawing Room, Into the Lawn". In Troost, Linda; Greenfield, Sayre N (eds.). Jane Austen in Hollywood. University Press of Kentucky. pp. 13–21. ISBN 978-0-8131-9006-8. Archived from the original on 26 July 2014.
- Dobie, Madeleine (2003). "Gender and the Heritage Film: Popular Feminism Turns to History". In Suzanne Rodin Pucci; James Thompson (eds.). Jane Austen and Co: Remaking the Past in Contemporary Culture. State University of New York Press. pp. 247–260. ISBN 0-7914-5616-1. Archived from the original on 27 July 2014.
- Dole, Carole M (2001). "Austen, Class, and the American Market". In Troost, Linda; Greenfield, Sayre N (eds.). Jane Austen in Hollywood. University Press of Kentucky. pp. 58–78. ISBN 978-0-8131-9006-8. Archived from the original on 26 July 2014.
- Doran, Lindsay (1995). "Introduction". In Doran, Lindsay; Thompson, Emma (eds.). Sense and Sensibility: The Screenplay and Diaries. Bloomsbury. pp. 7–40. ISBN 1-55704-782-0.
- Flavin, Louise (2004). Jane Austen in the Classroom: Viewing the Novel/reading the Film. Peter Lang Publishing. ISBN 0-8204-6811-8. Archived from the original on 19 October 2021.
- Gay, Penny (2003). "Sense and Sensibility in a Post-Feminist world: Sisterhood is Still Powerful". In MacDonald, Gina; MacDonald, Andrew (eds.). Jane Austen on Screen. Cambridge University Press. pp. 90–110. ISBN 0-521-79325-4. Archived from the original on 23 July 2014.
- Greenfield, Sayre N.; Troost, Linda V. (2001). "Watching Ourselves Watching". In Troost, Linda; Greenfield, Sayre N (eds.). Jane Austen in Hollywood. University Press of Kentucky. pp. 1–12. ISBN 978-0-8131-9006-8. Archived from the original on 26 July 2014.
- Higson, Andrew (2004). "English Heritage, English Literature, English Cinema: Selling Jane Austen to Movie Audiences in the 1990s". In Voigts-Virchow, Eckart (ed.). Janespotting and Beyond: British Heritage Retrovisions Since the Mid-1990s. Gunter Narr Verlag Tubingen. pp. 35–50. ISBN 3-8233-6096-5. Archived from the original on 19 October 2021.
- Higson, Andrew (2011). Film England: Culturally English Filmmaking Since the 1990s. I.B. Tauris. ISBN 978-1-84885-454-3.
- Jones, Wendy S. (2005). Consensual Fictions: Women, Liberalism, And The English Novel. University of Toronto Press. ISBN 0-8020-8717-5.
- Kohler-Ryan, Renee; Palmer, Sydney (2013). "What Do You Know of My Heart?: The Role of Sense and Sensibility in Ang Lee's Sense and Sensibility and Crouching Tiger Hidden Dragon". In Arp, Robert; Barkman, Adam; McRae, James (eds.). The Philosophy of Ang Lee. University Press of Kentucky. pp. 41–63. ISBN 978-0-8131-4166-4. Archived from the original on 19 October 2021.
- Looser, Devoney (1996). "Jane Austen 'Responds' to the Men's Movement". Persuasions On-Line. 18: 150–170. Archived from the original on 13 September 2013.
- McCreadie, Marsha (2006). Women Screenwriters Today: Their Lives and Words. Praeger Publishers. ISBN 0-275-98542-3.
- McRae, James (2013). "Conquering the Self: Daoism, Confucianism, and the Price of Freedom in Crouching Tiger, Hidden Dragon". In Arp, Robert; Barkman, Adam; McRae, James (eds.). The Philosophy of Ang Lee. University Press of Kentucky. pp. 19–40. ISBN 978-0-8131-4166-4. Archived from the original on 1 July 2019.
- Mills, Clifford W. (2009). Ang Lee. Chelsea House Publishers. ISBN 978-1-60413-566-4. Archived from the original on 19 October 2021.
- Nadoolman Landis, Deborah (2012). Filmcraft: Costume Design: Costume Design. Focal Press. ISBN 978-0-240-81867-2.
- Nixon, Cheryl L (2001). "Balancing the Courtship Hero: Masculine Emotional Display in Film Adaptations of Austen's Novels". In Troost, Linda; Greenfield, Sayre N (eds.). Jane Austen in Hollywood. University Press of Kentucky. pp. 22–43. ISBN 978-0-8131-9006-8. Archived from the original on 26 July 2014.
- Parrill, Sue (2002). Jane Austen on Film and Television: A Critical Study of the Adaptations. McFarland. ISBN 0-7864-1349-2. Archived from the original on 26 July 2014.
- Pidduck, Julianne (2000). "Of Windows and Country Walks: Frames of Space and Movement in 1990s Austen Adaptations". In You-Me Park; Rajeswari Sunder Rajan (eds.). The Postcolonial Jane Austen. Routledge. pp. 123–146. ISBN 0-415-23290-2. Archived from the original on 26 July 2014.
- Scholz, Anne-Marie (2013). From Fidelity to History: Film Adaptations as Cultural Events in the Twentieth Century. Berghahn Books. ISBN 978-0-85745-731-8. Archived from the original on 25 July 2014.
- Shih, Shu-mei (2007). Visuality and Identity: Sinophone Articulations Across the Pacific. University of California Press. ISBN 978-0-520-22451-3. Archived from the original on 19 October 2021.
- Simon, John Ivan (2005). John Simon On Film: Criticism, 1982–2001. Applause Books. ISBN 978-1-55783-507-9.
- Stempel, Tom (2000). Framework: A History of Screenwriting in the American Film. Syracuse University Press. ISBN 0-8156-0654-0. Archived from the original on 19 October 2021.
- Stovel, Nora (2011). "From Page to Screen: Emma Thompson's Film Adaptation of Sense and Sensibility". Persuasions On-Line. 32 (1). Archived from the original on 13 September 2013.
- Thompson, Emma (1995). "The Diaries". In Doran, Lindsay; Thompson, Emma (eds.). Sense and Sensibility: The Screenplay and Diaries. Bloomsbury. pp. 206–287. ISBN 1-55704-782-0.
- Thompson, Emma; Lindsay Doran (1995). Audio commentary for Sense and Sensibility (DVD). Special Features: Columbia Pictures.
- Thompson, James (2003). "How to Do Things with Austen". In Suzanne Rodin Pucci; James Thompson (eds.). Jane Austen and Co: Remaking the Past in Contemporary Culture. State University of New York Press. pp. 13–33. ISBN 0-7914-5616-1. Archived from the original on 27 July 2014.
- Troost, Linda V (2007). "The Nineteenth-century Novel on Film: Jane Austen". In Cartmell, Deborah; Whelehan, Imelda (eds.). The Cambridge Companion to Literature on Screen. Cambridge University Press. pp. 75–89. ISBN 978-0-521-61486-3.
- Voigts-Virchow, Eckart (2004). ""Corset Wars": An Introduction to Syncretic Heritage Film Culture Since the Mid-1990s". In Voigts-Virchow, Eckart (ed.). Janespotting and Beyond: British Heritage Retrovisions Since the Mid-1990s. Gunter Narr Verlag Tubingen. pp. 9–34. ISBN 3-8233-6096-5. Archived from the original on 19 October 2021.
