= Lone Star (1996 film) =

1996 neo-Western mystery film by John Sayles

- Theatrical release poster
- Directed by: John Sayles
- Written by: John Sayles
- Produced by: R. Paul Miller; Maggie Renzi
- Starring: Ron Canada; Chris Cooper; Clifton James; Kris Kristofferson; Frances McDormand; Joe Morton; Elizabeth Peña
- Cinematography: Stuart Dryburgh
- Edited by: John Sayles
- Music by: Mason Daring
- Production company: Castle Rock Entertainment; Rio Dulce
- Distributed by: Sony Pictures Classics
- Release dates: March 14, 1996 (SXSW); June 21, 1996 (United States)
- Running time: 135 minutes
- Country: United States
- Language: English
- Budget: $3–5 million
- Box office: $13 million

Lone Star is a 1996 American neo-Western mystery film written, edited, and directed by John Sayles. Set in a small town in South Texas, the film deals with a sheriff's (played by Chris Cooper) investigation into the murder of one of his predecessors (Kris Kristofferson) decades earlier. The cast also stars Joe Morton, Elizabeth Peña, Clifton James, Ron Canada, Frances McDormand and Matthew McConaughey.

The film premiered at the 1996 South by Southwest Festival on March 14, 1996 before being released by Sony Pictures Classics on June 21, 1996, and received widespread critical acclaim, with critics regarding it as a high point of 1990s independent cinema as well as one of Sayles's best films. Sayles's screenplay was nominated for an Academy Award, BAFTA Award, and Golden Globe Award. The film was also nominated for four Independent Spirit Awards, with Elizabeth Peña winning Best Supporting Female.

Lone Star was recognized by the American Film Institute in AFI's 10 Top 10 list in 2008 as a nominated Western Film.

== Plot ==
Two off-duty sergeants discover a human skeleton on an old U.S. Army rifle shooting range along with a Masonic ring, a Rio County sheriff's badge, and, later, an expended .45 pistol bullet. Sam Deeds, sheriff of Rio County, Frontera, Texas, begins an investigation. Forensics backs up the identity of the skeleton as Charlie Wade, the infamously corrupt sheriff who preceded Sam's recently deceased father, Buddy. Wade mysteriously disappeared in 1957, along with US$10,000 (Note: equivalent to $114,600 in 2025.) in county funds. Buddy's popular reputation and subsequent election as Sheriff after Wade's disappearance led to the widespread belief that Buddy confronted Wade and ran him out of town.

Frontera, on the banks of the Rio Grande, is a border town with racial strife among the Tejano, African American, Native American, and European American populations. There, the White population is no longer the majority. As a teenager, Sam hated his tyrannical father and left town as soon as he was old enough. He only returned to the town two years prior.

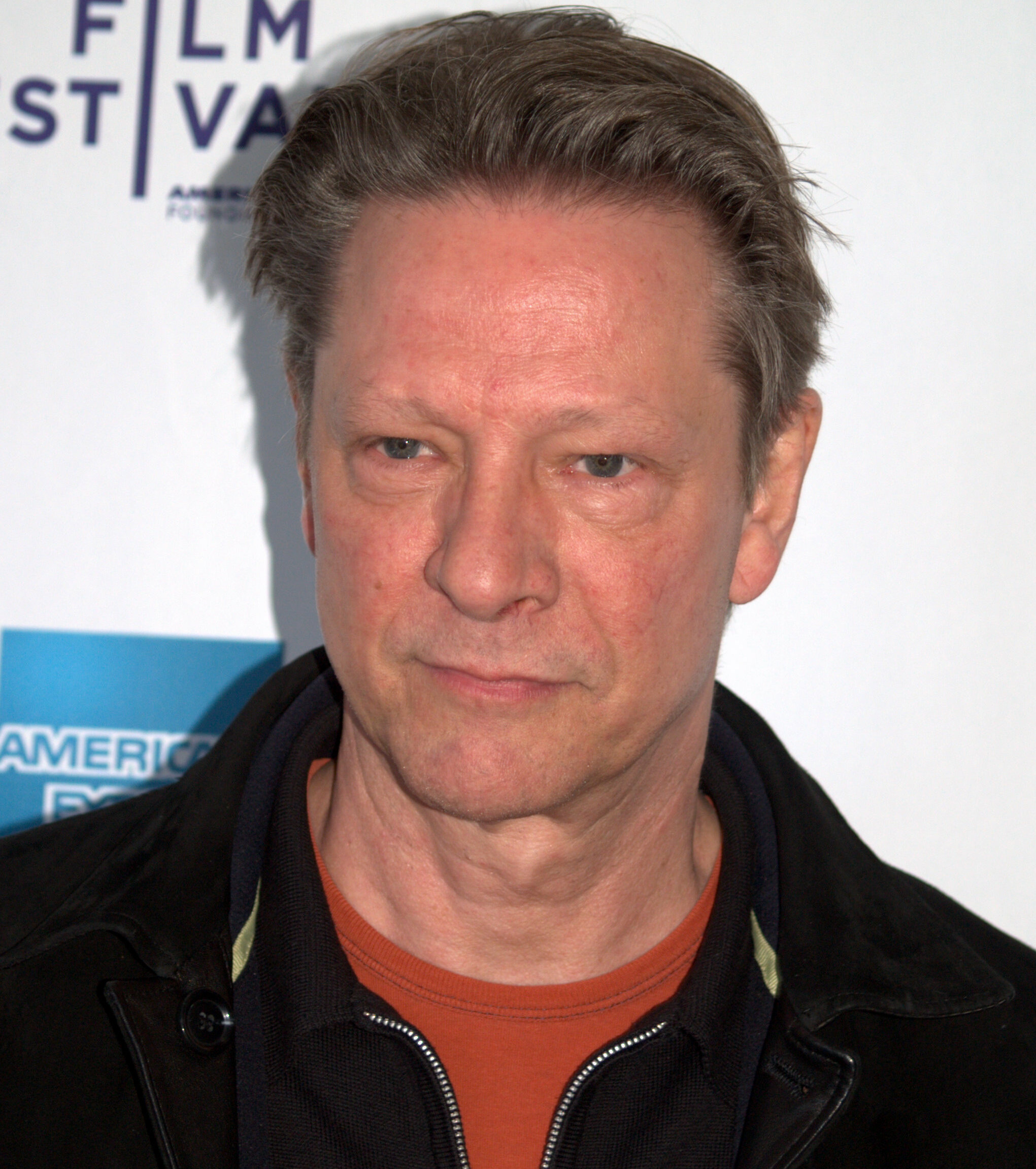
Chris Cooper plays Sam Deeds, who doggedly investigates the events leading up to Charlie Wade's murder despite being warned by prominent local figures not to poke into events from thirty years before.

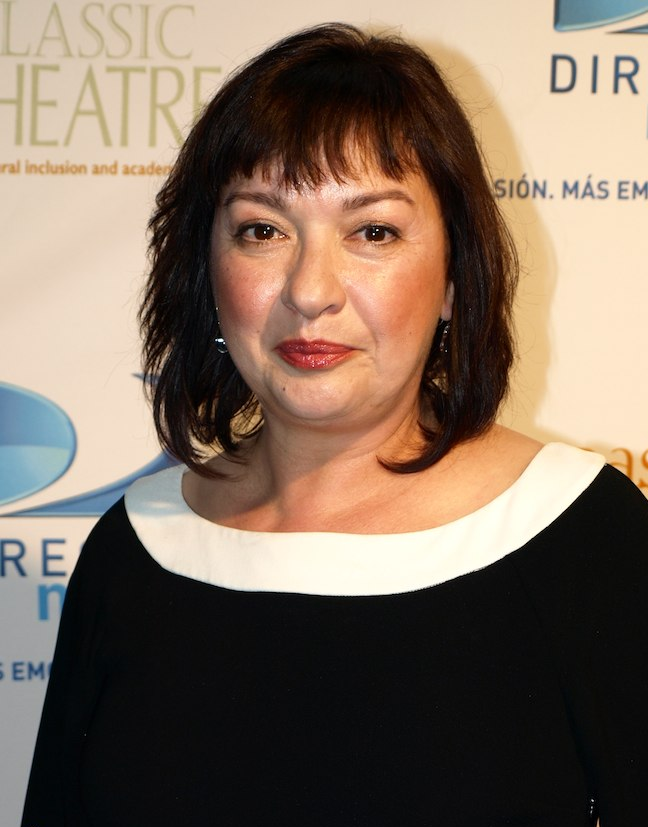
Elizabeth Peña plays Pilar Cruz, the widowed school teacher who as a Tejano girl had a relationship with Sam Deeds that was strongly opposed by both Buddy and Pilar's mother Mercedes.

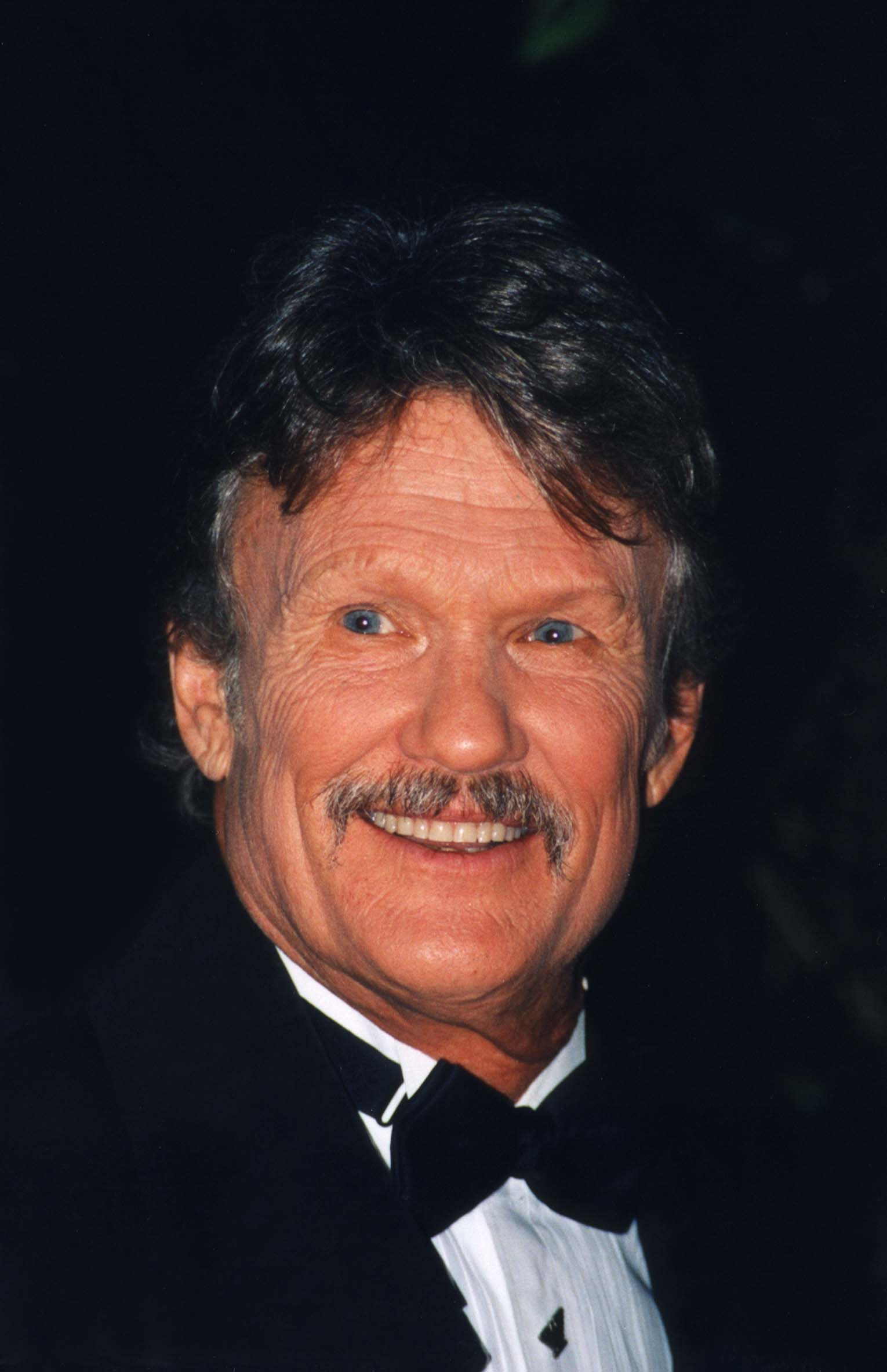
Kris Kristofferson plays Charlie Wade, the infamously corrupt sheriff who preceded Buddy Deeds and who mysteriously disappeared in 1957, along with $10,000 in county funds.

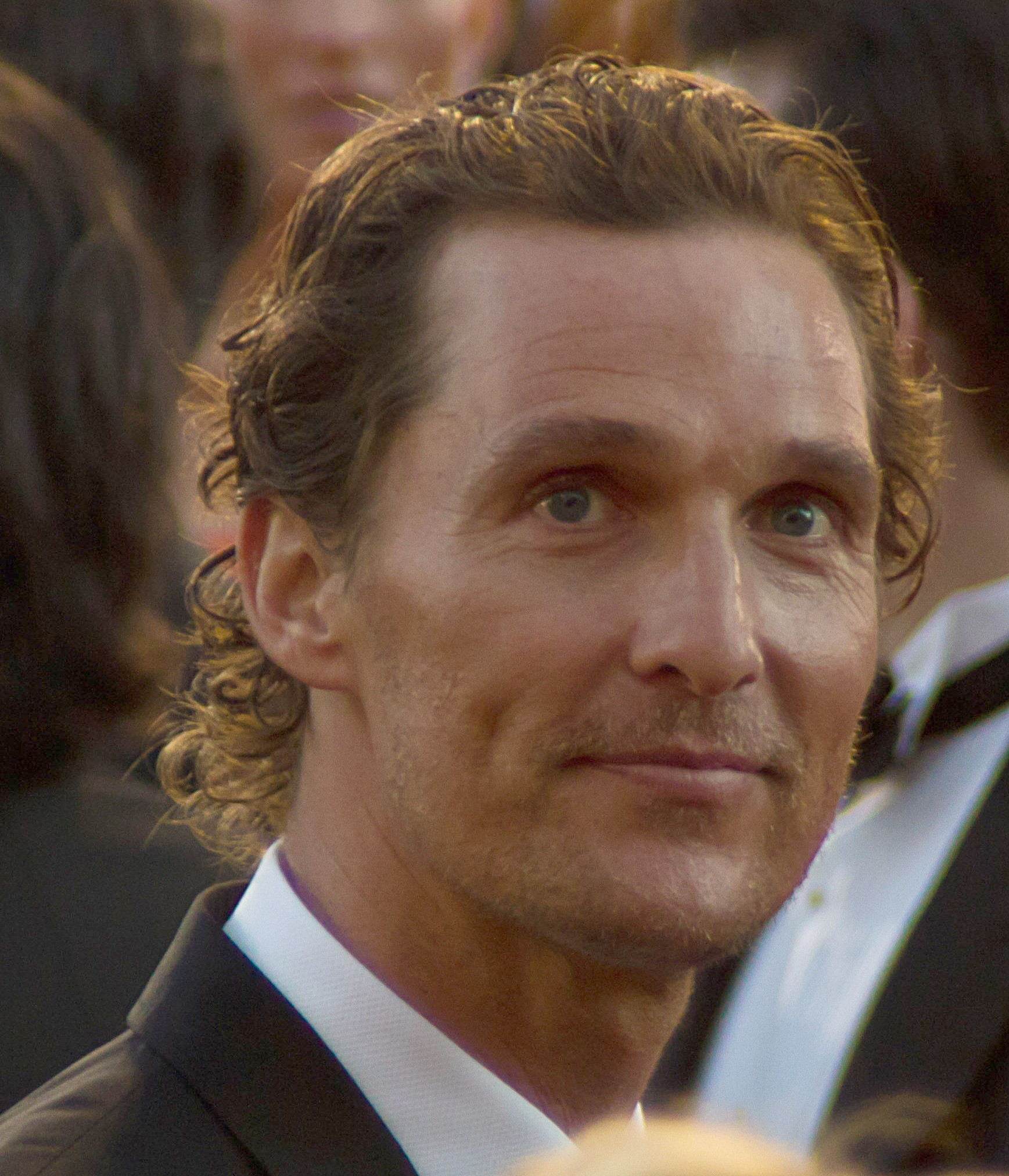
Matthew McConaughey plays Buddy Deeds, whose high reputation and election as Sheriff resulted from his being widely believed to have confronted Wade and driven him from town.

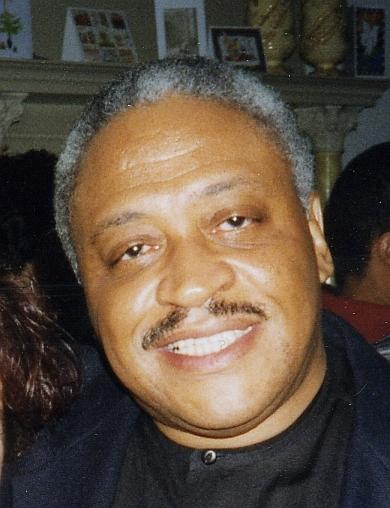
Ron Canada plays Otis Payne, a local nightclub owner who was running an illegal gambling operation at the time of Wade's disappearance.

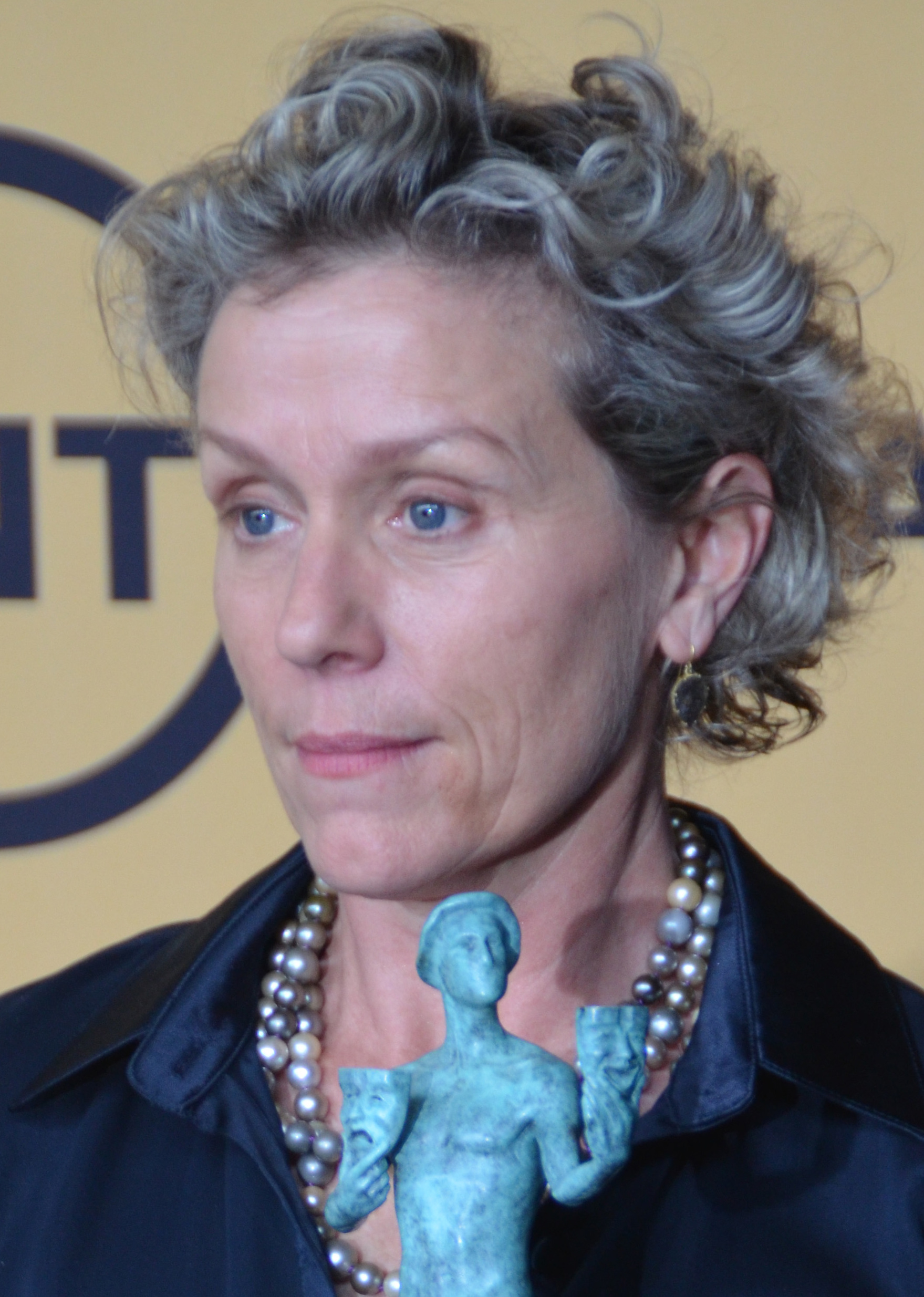
Frances McDormand plays Bunny, Sam Deeds's neurotic ex-wife.

The town is enlarging and renaming their courthouse in Buddy's honor and proposing the building of an unneeded new prison. As a teenager, Sam had been in love with Tejano girl Pilar Cruz. However, their relationship was strongly opposed by both Buddy and Pilar's mother Mercedes, who took steps to separate them.

After a chance meeting, the now divorced Sam and the widowed Pilar, now a teacher, begin to rekindle their lingering passion. Mercedes is again against this. Pilar mistakenly believes that Mercedes objects to Sam because of his "Anglo" ethnicity. Despite being of Mexican origin, however, Mercedes devalues Mexicans, claiming she is of Spanish descent.

Colonel Delmore Payne has returned to town as the commander of the local U.S. Army base. Delmore has been estranged from his father Otis "Big O" Payne, a local nightclub owner and leader of the Black community, since childhood, when the serial womanizer abandoned Delmore and his mother. When a quarrel involving a soldier from the base results in a shooting at Otis's club—witnessed by Delmore's own resentful underage son who is surreptitiously at the club to scout out his grandfather—Delmore confronts Otis and threatens to make his establishment "off-limits." Otis counters that his establishment is the only place in town where Black soldiers are welcome.

Despite being warned by Mayor Hollis Pogue and other prominent local figures not to look into events from forty years before, Sam doggedly investigates the events leading up to Wade's murder. Wade terrorized the local Black and Mexican communities, extorting money from business owners and committing numerous murders (Note: one page of a list shown in the film includes five people murdered by Wade.) by setting up his victims and shooting them for "resisting arrest". In front of a horrified Deputy Sheriff Hollis, Wade murdered Eladio Cruz, Mercedes's husband, who was running a migrant smuggling operation across the border without kickbacks to Wade.

Uncovering secrets about his father's term as sheriff, Sam discovers Buddy's own corruption, kickbacks, and use of prison labor for personal building projects. Buddy forcibly evicted residents of a small community to make a lake, with Buddy and Hollis receiving lakefront property. Sam eventually discovers love letters from Buddy's longtime mistress—Mercedes Cruz.

Sam confronts Hollis and Otis about Wade's murder. Upon discovering Otis's clandestine gambling operation at the nightclub, a furious Wade ordered Otis to hand over extortion money. Wade was about to use his "resisting arrest" setup to kill Otis. Buddy arrived just as Hollis shot Wade to prevent Otis's murder. The three buried the body and took $10,000 from the county as an alibi for Wade's "abscondence". They gave the money to Mercedes—who was destitute after Wade killed Eladio—to buy her restaurant. Buddy and Mercedes later got involved. Sam decides to drop the issue, saying that Wade's murder will remain unsolved. Hollis is concerned that people will assume that Buddy killed Wade to take his job. Sam replies that Buddy's legend can handle it.

Showing Pilar an old photo of Buddy embracing Mercedes, Sam says that Eladio died 18 months before she was born, revealing that Buddy is Pilar's father. Both are appalled over the years of deception and repercussions, but since Pilar cannot have any more children, they decide to continue their romantic relationship, despite the knowledge that they are half-siblings.

== Cast ==
- Chris Cooper as Sheriff Sam Deeds
  - Tay Strathairn as Young Sam Deeds
- Elizabeth Peña as Pilar Cruz
  - Vanessa Martinez as Young Pilar Cruz
- Kris Kristofferson as Sheriff Charlie Wade
- Clifton James as Mayor Hollis Pogue
  - Jeff Monahan as Young Hollis Pogue
- Míriam Colón as Mercedes Cruz
  - Azalea Mendez as Young Mercedes Cruz
- Joe Morton as Colonel Delmore "Del" Payne
- Ron Canada as Otis Payne
  - Gabriel Casseus as Young Otis Payne
- Matthew McConaughey as Buddy Deeds
- Frances McDormand as Bunny
- Tony Plana as Ray
- Jesse Borrego as Danny
- Richard Coca as Enrique
- Carmen de Lavallade as Carolyn
- Stephen Mendillo as Cliff
- Tony Amendola as Chucho Montoya
  - James Borrego as Young Chucho Montoya
- LaTanya Richardson as Priscilla Worth
- Gordon Tootoosis as Wesley Birdsong
- Beatrice Winde as Minnie Bledsoe
- Chandra Wilson as Athena
- Leo Burmester as Cody

== Themes ==
The film deconstructs the concept of borders, both in the literal and figurative sense. The film takes place in a border town (its name Frontera is the Spanish word for "border"), along the U.S.-Mexico border. In Frontera, figurative barriers exist between different racial and cultural groups, specifically the Anglo, Black, and Tejano communities. The film goes on to subvert the idea of borders, as it depicts literal border crossings (such as Mercedes and Eladio immigrating to Texas from Mexico), as well as border crossings in a racial, generational, and cultural sense.

Through its cross-cultural and time-spanning narrative, the film explores how people from disparate ethnicities and cultures are intertwined, past and present. Nuances and differences within and among specific communities are shown. For instance, Otis is African-American but is also of Indigenous descent. Pilar believes she is fully Tejano, only to discover she is half-white. The Tejano community itself has Mexican, Chicano, Mexican American, Spanish, Hispano, American and/or Indigenous ancestry. Mercedes is herself an immigrant from Mexico, but over the years has chosen to distance herself from that heritage, choosing to identify as "Spanish" and looking down on other Mexican immigrants.

The moral border between "good people" and "bad people" is likewise complicated, as Sam learns the truth about his father and some of his unsavory dealings. Sam is intent on unraveling the inflated myths that surround Buddy as an upstanding sheriff. He ultimately discovers that the father he despises is neither as bad as he has always believed him to be, nor as good as his burdensome legend depicts. Intergenerational borders that divide Sam and Buddy, as well as Otis and Delmore Payne and Mercedes and Pilar Cruz, are eventually bridged as characters learn various truths about their parents and repair the fissures in strained relationships.

Other themes include historical revisionism, mythmaking, and how legends are used to obscure inconvenient truths. The question of who gets to interpret history and why is most evident in the competing stories about Buddy, as well as in the school board meeting scene in which parents and teachers argue over the appropriate version of Texas history to teach high school students. In historical accounts of the Battle of the Alamo, it is often the heroic feats of Anglo figures like Davy Crockett and Jim Bowie that are celebrated, while the contributions of Mexicans, African-Americans, and Native Americans are relegated to the margins. Sayles stated he wanted the film to address the concept of historical revisionism, saying "One of the things that Lone Star is about, to me, is the way in which American culture has always, always been many cultures. [But] in many places, the dominant culture gets to write the history."

The dismantling of myth is encapsulated with the film's final lines, "Forget the Alamo." "Remember the Alamo" is a famous battle cry that honors Texans' loss to the Mexicans at the Battle of the Alamo. The "Forget" line deconstructs the mythmaking behind the Alamo story and the barriers that separate Pilar and Sam—the racial barrier, as well as the barrier of their blood relation. In an essay for The Criterion Channel, Domino Renee Perez writes, "The Alamo, both as a historical site and as a symbol, looms large in Texas mythmaking. But Sayles's film is more about revealing the dark secrets behind, rather than building up, a myth—the myth of Buddy Deeds. Pilar and Sam's resolve to forget represents a turn away from that legacy as they attempt to write their own futures, ones not beholden to any history."

Writers noted that the school board scene of parents challenging teachers has taken on a prescient meaning in light of the contemporary political climate and controversy over critical race theory.

== Production ==
=== Background ===
John Sayles decided to make a film about the Texas border after going there in 1978 to shoot a cameo for an earlier film he wrote, and then visiting the Alamo in San Antonio, and coming up with a script that "had elements of a Western, but it was more of a detective story. It was one of those rare instances where I wrote it and we got the money to make it right away."

=== Casting ===
Sayles cast newcomer Matthew McConaughey, whose biggest role prior to Lone Star was in Richard Linklater's Dazed and Confused, in a major role because "I needed a guy who didn't have any star weight but who had the presence to play off against Kristofferson."

=== Filming ===
Filming took place on-location throughout southwestern Texas and along the Rio Grande, mainly in the towns of Del Rio, Eagle Pass and Laredo.

Sayles did not want to film the flashback scenes with visible cuts to the present-day scenes, and instead used pans so the transitions occurred within a single camera shot. These allowed the transitions to "feel like it was just a flow like time or like [a] river". An example is the scene where a present-day Sam is seen in the same place in present-day where he and Pilar have just strolled together discussing their past, and where Sam lingers to recollect a scene that took place on the same spot 23 years before between his 15-year-old self and a 14-year old Pilar.

=== Music ===
Mason Daring's soundtrack uses music from a variety of genres, including juke joint music, conjunto, and country music, to highlight the melting pot of cultures in Rio County.

== Reception ==
=== Box office ===
Lone Star premiered at South by Southwest on March 14, 1996. It later screened in the Directors' Fortnight section at the Cannes Film Festival on May 10, 1996. It was released in North American theaters on June 21, 1996, and ultimately made $13 million at the box office on an estimated budget of $3–4.5 million.

=== Critical response ===
On the review aggregator website Rotten Tomatoes, 91% of 140 critics' reviews are positive, with an average rating of 8.8/10. The website's consensus reads: "Smart and absorbing, Lone Star represents a career high point for writer-director John Sayles – and '90s independent cinema in general." On Metacritic, it has a score of 79 out of 100 based on reviews from 23 critics, indicating "generally favorable" reviews.

Writing at the time of release, Janet Maslin of The New York Times said, "This long, spare, contemplatively paced film, scored with a wide range of musical styles and given a sun-baked clarity by Stuart Dryburgh's cinematography, is loaded with brief, meaningful encounters... And it features a great deal of fine, thoughtful acting, which can always be counted on in a film by Mr. Sayles". "All the film's characters are flesh and blood", Maslin added, pointing particularly to the portrayals by Kristofferson, Canada, James, Morton and Colón.

The Los Angeles Times's Kenneth Turan praised the film, writing its triumph is "how well it integrates Sayles' [social] concerns with the heightened tension and narrative drive the thriller form provides". Film critics Dennis West and Joan M. West of Cineaste praised the psychological aspects of the film, writing, "Lone Star strikingly depicts the personal psychological boundaries that confront many citizens of Frontera as a result of living in such close proximity to the border".

Roger Ebert awarded the film 4 out of 4 stars. His review read, "Lone Star is a great American movie, one of the few to seriously try to regard with open eyes the way we live now. Set in a town that until very recently was rigidly segregated, it shows how Chicanos, blacks, whites and Indians shared a common history, and how they knew one another and dealt with one another in ways that were off the official map. This film is a wonder -- the best work yet by one of our most original and independent filmmakers -- and after it is over, and you begin to think about it, its meanings begin to flower."

Ann Hornaday, then writing for the Austin American-Statesman, declared it "a work of awesome sweep and acute perception", judging it "the most accomplished film of [Sayles'] 17-year career". The Washington Post writer Hal Hinson characterized it as "a carefully crafted, unapologetically literary accomplishment."

In 2004, William Arnold of the Seattle Post-Intelligencer said that the film was "widely regarded as Sayles' masterpiece", declaring that it had "captured the zeitgeist of the '90s as successfully as "Chinatown" did the '70s".

In 2020, Hornaday compiled a list for The Washington Post titled "The 34 Best Political Movies Ever Made", in which she ranked Lone Star at number 10. Describing Lone Star as Sayles's masterwork, she wrote, "A simultaneously epic and finely drawn intergenerational and time-shifting murder mystery set on the Texas-Mexico border, Lone Star interrogates history, narrative and tidal shifts in power through the lens of race and immigration, but never at the expense of their complexities. Timely when it first came out, today it feels more relevant than ever."

In 2024, Lone Star was rereleased in a brand new 4K restoration leading to further critical analysis of the film. Writing in The Guardian, Peter Bradshaw lavished the film with praise, calling it an "overlooked strand of indie movie-making and myth-making in 90s Hollywood, distinct from the brilliant ironies and shocks of Tarantino or the literary noir of the Coen brothers." He gave the film five stars saying "it is thoughtful and complex and grownup."

=== Accolades ===
The film received an Academy Award nomination for Best Screenplay for John Sayles. The film also won the Belgian Grand Prix, and the awards for Best Director and Best Screenplay from the Society of Texas Film Critics Awards. The screenplay was nominated for a Writers Guild of America Award, a BAFTA Award, and a Golden Globe Award.

Elizabeth Peña won the Independent Spirit Award for Best Supporting Female and the BRAVO Award for Outstanding Actress in a Feature Film. The film was nominated for three Independent Spirit Awards: Best Male Lead (Chris Cooper), Best Film, and Best Screenplay.

The film is recognized by the American Film Institute in AFI's 10 Top 10 list in 2008 as a nominated Western Film.

== Home media ==
In 2023, The Criterion Collection announced they were releasing a 4K digital restoration of Lone Star, supervised by Sayles and cinematographer Stuart Dryburgh. The restoration was released on Blu-ray disc on January 16, 2024. The edition includes a new interview with Dryburgh and a conversation between Sayles and filmmaker Gregory Nava.
