= Society of Texas Film Critics =

- Formation: 1994
- Dissolved: 1998
- Purpose: Film critics
- Location: Houston, Texas
- Founder: Michael MacCambridge

The Society of Texas Film Critics (STFC) was an organization composed of selected print, television, radio, and internet film critics from across the state of Texas. Every major metropolitan area of the state was represented among its membership.

The STFC was founded in 1994 by Michael MacCambridge, former film critic of the Austin American-Statesman. The organization presented a set of awards each year for excellence in film, including a Lone Star Award for a film set or shot in the Lone Star State. Founded with 21 members, the size of the organization decreased slightly each year. By 1996, film critic Joe Leydon had taken the role of Society president. The group disbanded in 1998 after just four years of awards ceremonies.

== Ceremonies ==
The past annual ceremonies for the Society of Texas Film Critics Awards were:

- Society of Texas Film Critics Awards 1994
- Society of Texas Film Critics Awards 1995
- Society of Texas Film Critics Awards 1996
- Society of Texas Film Critics Awards 1997

== See also ==
- Cinema of Texas
