= List of awards and nominations received by Ed Harris =

Ed Harris awards and nominations
- Soderbergh in 2026
Awards and nominations
| Award | Wins | Nominations |
| Academy Awards | 0 | 4 |
| Actor Awards | 2 | 10 |
| BAFTA Awards | 0 | 2 |
| Critics' Choice | 1 | 3 |
| Emmy Awards | 0 | 3 |
| Golden Globes | 2 | 6 |
| Olivier Awards | 0 | 1 |
| Tony Awards | 0 | 1 |

Totals (Note: Certain award groups do not simply award one winner. They acknowledge several different recipients, have runners-up, and have third place. Since this is a specific recognition and is different from losing an award, runner-up mentions are considered wins in this award tally. For simplification and to avoid errors, each award in this list has been presumed to have had a prior nomination.)
- Wins: 24
- Nominations: 66

This article is a list of awards and nominations received by Ed Harris.

Ed Harris is an American actor and filmmaker known for his commanding roles on stage and screen. Harris has received various accolades including two Actor Awards, a Critics' Choice Movie Award, a Drama Desk Award and two Golden Globe Awards as well as nominations for four Academy Awards, two British Academy Film Awards, three Primetime Emmy Awards, a Laurence Olivier Award and a Tony Award.

Harris gained acclaim for an early film portrayal as astronaut John Glenn in the historical epic drama The Right Stuff (1983) for which was voted as Runner-Up by the New York Film Critics Circle Award for Best Supporting Actor. He then acted in a string of critically acclaimed dramas including Places in the Heart (1984), The Abyss (1989), and Glengarry Glen Ross (1992). In 1989, he played a Vietnam war veteran struggling with PTSD in the drama Jacknife (1989) for which he was nominated for the Golden Globe Award for Best Supporting Actor – Motion Picture.

He then portrayed aerospace engineer Gene Kranz in the Ron Howard directed historical drama Apollo 13 (1995), earning nominations for the Academy Award, the Actor Award and the Golden Globe Award for Best Supporting Actor – Motion Picture. That same year, he portrayed E. Howard Hunt in the Oliver Stone directed historical epic Nixon (1995) for which won the Critics' Choice Movie Award for Best Supporting Actor.

For his role as a mysterious director in Peter Weir's drama The Truman Show (1998), he won the Golden Globe Award and was nominated for the Academy Award and BAFTA Award. He then portrayed painter Jackson Pollock in the film he directed Pollock (2000), for which was nominated for the Academy Award for Best Actor. Harris then portrayed a poet dying of AIDS in the Stephen Daldry directed period drama The Hours (2002) for which he was nominated for the Academy Award, Actor Award, BAFTA Award, and Golden Globe Award for Best Supporting Actor.

On television, he portrayed the central character in the HBO miniseries Empire Falls (2005) for which he was nominated for the Actor Award, the Primetime Emmy Award, and Golden Globe Award. He then played Senator John McCain in the HBO television film Game Change (2012) earning a Golden Globe Award for Best Supporting Actor as well as nominations for an Actor Award and a Primetime Emmy Award. For his role as The Man in Black in the HBO science-fiction revisionist western series Westworld (2016) he was nominated for a Primetime Emmy Award.

On Broadway, he played a working class father in the George Furth play Precious Son (1986) for which won the Drama Desk Award for Outstanding Actor in a Play and was nominated for the Tony Award for Best Actor in a Play. He made his West End debut playing a son who returns to his Midwestern dysfunctional family in Sam Shepard's Buried Child, earning a Laurence Olivier Award for Best Actor nomination.

== Major associations ==
=== Academy Awards ===
| Year | Category | Nominated work | Result | Ref. |
|---|---|---|---|---|
| 1995 | Best Supporting Actor | Apollo 13 | Nominated | |
| 1998 | Best Supporting Actor | The Truman Show | Nominated | |
| 2000 | Best Actor | Pollock | Nominated | |
| 2002 | Best Supporting Actor | The Hours | Nominated | |

=== Actor Awards ===
| Year | Category | Nominated work | Result | Ref. |
|---|---|---|---|---|
| 1996 | Outstanding Cast in a Motion Picture | Nixon | Nominated | |
| 1996 | Outstanding Cast in a Motion Picture | Apollo 13 | Won | |
| 1996 | Outstanding Actor in a Supporting Role | Apollo 13 | Won | |
| 1997 | Outstanding Actor in a Miniseries or Television Movie | Riders of the Purple Sage | Nominated | |
| 2002 | Outstanding Cast in a Motion Picture | A Beautiful Mind | Nominated | |
| 2003 | Outstanding Cast in a Motion Picture | The Hours | Nominated | |
| 2003 | Outstanding Actor in a Supporting Role | The Hours | Nominated | |
| 2006 | Outstanding Actor in a Miniseries or Television Movie | Empire Falls | Nominated | |
| 2013 | Outstanding Actor in a Miniseries or Television Movie | Game Change | Nominated | |
| 2017 | Outstanding Ensemble in a Drama Series | Westworld | Nominated | |

=== BAFTA Awards ===
| Year | Category | Nominated work | Result | Ref. |
British Academy Film Awards
| 1998 | Best Actor in a Supporting Role | The Truman Show | Nominated | |
| 2002 | Best Actor in a Supporting Role | The Hours | Nominated | |

=== Critics' Choice Awards ===
| Year | Category | Nominated work | Result | Ref. |
Critics' Choice Movie Awards
| 1995 | Best Supporting Actor | Nixon / Apollo 13 / Just Cause | Won | |
| 2002 | Best Acting Ensemble | The Hours | Nominated | |
| 2007 | Best Acting Ensemble | Gone Baby Gone | Nominated | |

=== Emmy Awards ===
| Year | Category | Nominated work | Result | Ref. |
Primetime Emmy Awards
| 2005 | Outstanding Lead Actor in a Limited Series or Movie | Empire Falls | Nominated | |
| 2012 | Outstanding Supporting Actor in a Limited Series or Movie | Game Change | Nominated | |
| 2018 | Outstanding Lead Actor in a Drama Series | Westworld | Nominated | |

=== Golden Globe Awards ===
| Year | Category | Nominated work | Result | Ref. |
|---|---|---|---|---|
| 1989 | Best Supporting Actor | Jacknife | Nominated | |
| 1995 | Best Supporting Actor | Apollo 13 | Nominated | |
| 1998 | Best Supporting Actor | The Truman Show | Won | |
| 2002 | Best Supporting Actor | The Hours | Nominated | |
| 2005 | Best Actor in a Miniseries or TV Movie | Empire Falls | Nominated | |
| 2012 | Best Supporting Actor - Television | Game Change | Won | |

=== Laurence Olivier Awards ===
| Year | Category | Nominated work | Result | Ref. |
|---|---|---|---|---|
| 2017 | Best Actor | Buried Child | Nominated | |

=== Tony Awards ===
| Year | Category | Nominated work | Result | Ref. |
|---|---|---|---|---|
| 1986 | Best Actor in a Play | Precious Sons | Nominated | |

== Miscellaneous awards ==
| Year | Award | Nominated work | Result |
|---|---|---|---|
| 1983 | New York Film Critics Circle Award for Best Supporting Actor | The Right Stuff | Nominated |
| 1984 | Obie Award for Distinguished Performance by an Actor | Fool for Love | Won |
| 1986 | Drama Desk Award for Outstanding Actor in a Play | Precious Sons | Won |
| 1986 | Theatre World Award | Precious Sons | Won |
| 1989 | Saturn Award for Best Actor | The Abyss | Nominated |
| 1992 | Valladolid International Film Festival Award for Best Actor | Glengarry Glen Ross | Won |
| 1995 | Southeastern Film Critics Association Award for Best Supporting Actor | Apollo 13 | Won |
| 1995 | Dallas-Fort Worth Film Critics Association Award for Best Supporting Actor | Apollo 13 | Runner-up |
| 1995 | Chicago Film Critics Association Award for Best Supporting Actor | Apollo 13 | Nominated |
| 1995 | Lucille Lortel Award for Outstanding Lead Actor in a Play | Simpatico | Won |
| 1996 | Bronze Wrangler for Television Feature Film | Riders of the Purple Sage | Won |
| 1998 | Blockbuster Entertainment Award for Favorite Supporting Actor — Drama | The Truman Show | Won |
| 1998 | National Board of Review Award for Best Supporting Actor | The Truman Show | Won |
| 1998 | Southeastern Film Critics Association Award for Best Supporting Actor | The Truman Show | Won |
| 1998 | Online Film Critics Society Award for Best Supporting Actor | The Truman Show | Nominated |
| 1998 | Saturn Award for Best Supporting Actor | The Truman Show | Nominated |
| 2000 | Toronto Film Critics Association Award for Best Actor | Pollock | Won |
| 2000 | Satellite Award for Best Actor – Motion Picture Drama | Pollock | Nominated |
| 2001 | Satellite Award for Best Supporting Actor – Motion Picture | A Beautiful Mind | Nominated |
| 2002 | Dallas-Fort Worth Film Critics Association Award for Best Supporting Actor | The Hours | 3rd Place |
| 2002 | London Film Critics Circle Award for Actor of the Year | The Hours | Nominated |
| 2002 | Phoenix Film Critics Society Award for Best Cast | The Hours | Nominated |
| 2002 | Italian Online Movie Award for Best Cast | The Hours | Won |
| 2002 | Italian Online Movie Award for Best Supporting Actor | The Hours | Won |
| 2005 | Satellite Award for Best Actor – Miniseries or Television Film | Empire Falls | Nominated |
| 2005 | Women's Image Network Award for Best Actor in a Made-for-TV Movie/Miniseries | Empire Falls | Won |
| 2005 | National Society of Film Critics Award for Best Supporting Actor | A History of Violence | Won |
| 2007 | Drama Desk Award for Outstanding Solo Performance | Wrecks | Nominated |
| 2007 | Outer Critics Circle Award for Outstanding Solo Performance | Wrecks | Nominated |
| 2008 | Boston Film Festival Prize for Best Screenplay Adaptation | Appaloosa | Won |
| 2008 | Bronze Wrangler for Theatrical Motion Picture | Appaloosa | Won |
| 2012 | Golden Nymph Award for Best Performance by an Actor – Television Film | Game Change | Nominated |
| 2014 | Women Film Critics Circle - Adrienne Shelly Award | Frontera | Won |
| 2016 | Lucille Lortel Award for Outstanding Lead Actor in a Play | Buried Child | Nominated |
| 2017 | Saturn Award for Best Supporting Actor on Television | Westworld | Won |
| 2019 | Saturn Award for Best Supporting Actor on Television | Westworld | Nominated |
