= The Whore's Child and Other Stories =

- First edition
- Author: Richard Russo
- Language: English
- Publisher: Alfred A. Knopf
- Publication date: July 9, 2002
- Publication place: United States
- Media type: Print
- Pages: 225
- ISBN: 0-375-41168-2

The Whore's Child and Other Stories is a collection of seven short stories by American author Richard Russo, published in 2002 by Alfred A. Knopf. It was published after Russo received the Pulitzer Prize for Empire Falls hence gained considerable attention and many, mostly favorable reviews.

== Stories ==
First publication in brackets.

- "The Whore's Child" (Harper's, February 1998) – Ignoring normal procedures Sister Ursula invades the advanced fiction writing course taught by the narrator. In her writing she tells her life story, ill-treated by the nuns at the Belgian Convent School where she is brought up and where she was branded 'the whore's child'. (online text)
- "Monhegan Light" (Esquire, August 2001) – Widower and successful Los Angeles Director of Photography Martin is sent a nude painting of his wife Laura by her bitter sister Joyce. He visits the artists community on Monhegan Island accompanied by his latest girlfriend Beth, in search of the artist whom he has realized was his wife's lover.
- "The Farther You Go" (Shenandoah) – In Durham, Connecticut college lecturer Hank, in pain from prostate surgery discovers his daughter Julie has been hit by her husband Russell. Julie asks Hank to be there when she tells Russell to leave, and Hank drives Russell to Bradley Airport. Russo later developed the characters into the 1997 novel Straight Man.
- "Joy Ride" (Meridian, Fall 1998) – A twelve-year-old boy embarks on a road trip with his mother from Camden, Maine, to California as she leaves her husband.
- "Buoyancy" (High Fidelity, ed. John McNally, pub. William Morrow, 1997) – A retired literature professor takes his wife on a long-postponed trip to Martha's Vineyard but memories of his wife's nervous breakdown some years previously resurface as they find themselves on a nudist beach.
- "Poison" (Kiosk) – At the narrators beachfront house funded by his success as a screenwriter he is reunited with a fellow writer who grew up in the same industrial town and with whom he has an uneasy relationship.
- "The Mysteries of Linwood Hart" – Ten-year-old Linwood attempts to make sense of his parents relationships both with each other and with their wider family while he is finding his place in his American Legion Baseball team.

== Film adaptations ==
- "Monhegan Light", "The Farther You Go" and "Joy Ride" have all been adapted into short films.

== Reception ==
- Rand Richards Cooper in The New York Times writes: "The Whore's Child abjures Russo's typical working-class settings and protagonists in favor of professors and writers caught in the drift of late middle age....By and large, the stories are harsher and more somber than one expects from Russo....It's fascinating to contemplate how a different form produces a different writer – in Russo's case, a less funny one. The short story alters the tragicomic balance that is a hallmark of his novels, darkening it, making for a different sound and feel and attitude toward his characters....it's a charming performance, one that succeeds through its author's sure grasp of paradox: that to imagine the limitations of your imagination is to begin to comprehend the world beyond childhood."
- Kirkus Reviews states: "Russo is at his best in the beautifully developed title story, in which a nun’s accidental grasp of the truth about her childhood functions as epiphany also for her divorced creative-writing teacher. And he’s unrivaled by any writer since the early Salinger at striking to the heart of childhood-becoming-adolescence: in the novella-length history of an introspective ten-year-old ('The Mysteries of Linwood Hart') slowly, painstakingly maturing out of his suspicion that the world revolves around him; and in the superb 'Joy Ride.'"
- People also praises Russo as having "the quiet authority of someone with a valuable story to tell, a story about ordinary people in the extraordinary circumstances we recognize as normal existence. His relaxed, almost conversational style allows him to work his way into the hearts and souls of these compassionately drawn characters. It's an admirable achievement to make these well-crafted and deftly plotted tales seem as unlikely and as plausible as your life."
