= List of accolades received by Pulp Fiction =

Pulp Fiction awards and nominations
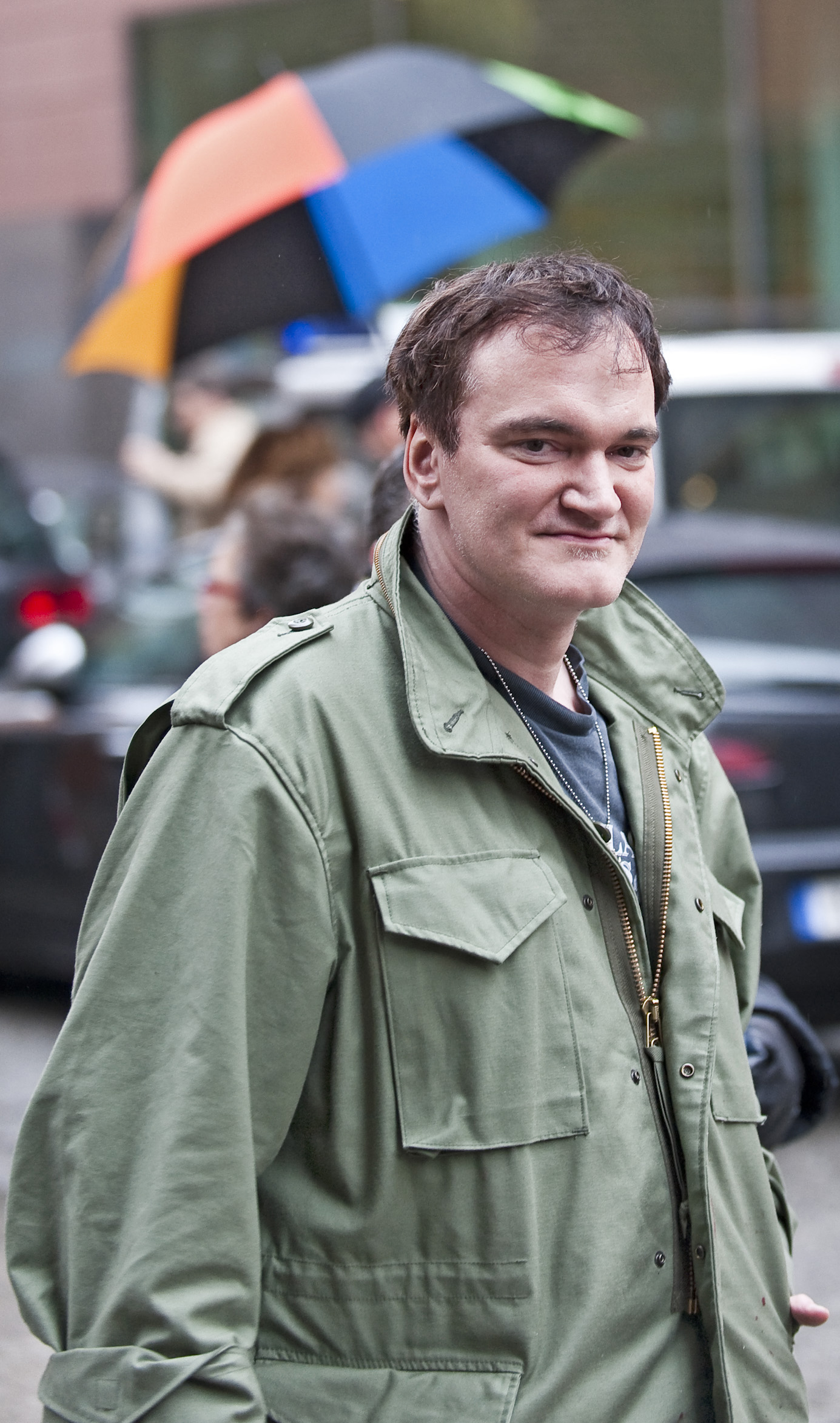
- Pulp Fiction received critical acclaim and earned Quentin Tarantino the Academy Award for Best Original Screenplay
Awards and nominations
| Award | Wins | Nominations |

Totals (Note: Certain award groups do not simply award one winner. They acknowledge several different recipients, have runners-up, and have third place. Since this is a specific recognition and is different from losing an award, runner-up mentions are considered wins in this award tally. For simplification and to avoid errors, each award in this list has been presumed to have had a prior nomination.)
- Wins: 23
- Nominations: 51

Pulp Fiction is a 1994 American crime film written and directed by Quentin Tarantino, who conceived it with Roger Avary, for A Band Apart and Jersey Films. It stars an ensemble cast consisting of John Travolta, Samuel L. Jackson, Uma Thurman, Harvey Keitel, Tim Roth, Amanda Plummer, Maria de Medeiros, Ving Rhames, Eric Stoltz, Rosanna Arquette, Christopher Walken, and Bruce Willis. The plot is told out of chronological order and features three main interrelated stories with different protagonists: Vincent Vega (Travolta), a hitman; Butch Coolidge (Willis), a prizefighter; and Jules Winnfield (Jackson), Vincent's business partner. The film was produced by Lawrence Bender, shot with cinematographer Andrzej Sekuła, and edited by Sally Menke on an $8 million production budget. It was theatrically released by Miramax on October 14, 1994, and was a commercial success, grossing $213.9 million worldwide.

At the 67th Academy Awards, Pulp Fiction nominated in seven categories and won Best Screenplay Written Directly for the Screen (Quentin Tarantino and Roger Avary). At the 52nd Golden Globe Awards it received six nominations and won Best Screenplay – Motion Picture. At the 48th British Academy Film Awards it received nine nominations and won two, including those for Best Original Screenplay and Best Supporting Actor (Samuel L. Jackson). At the 47th Cannes Film Festival it won Palme d'Or award.

It became one of the seven films to win Best Picture from three out of four major U.S. film critics' groups (Los Angeles Film Critics, National Board of Review Award, New York Film Critics Circle, National Society of Film Critics) along with Nashville, All the President's Men, Terms of Endearment, Goodfellas, The Hurt Locker, and Drive My Car.

== Awards and nominations ==
| Award (Note: Awards, festivals and organizations are in Alphabetical order.) | Date of ceremony (Note: Date is linked to the article about the awards held that year, wherever possible.) | Category | Recipient(s) | Result | Ref. |
|---|---|---|---|---|---|
| Academy Awards | 27 March 1995 | Best Picture | Lawrence Bender | Nominated | |
| Academy Awards | 27 March 1995 | Best Director | Quentin Tarantino | Nominated | |
| Academy Awards | 27 March 1995 | Best Actor | John Travolta | Nominated | |
| Academy Awards | 27 March 1995 | Best Supporting Actor | Samuel L. Jackson | Nominated | |
| Academy Awards | 27 March 1995 | Best Supporting Actress | Uma Thurman | Nominated | |
| Academy Awards | 27 March 1995 | Best Screenplay – Written Directly for the Screen | Quentin Tarantino and Roger Avary | Won | |
| Academy Awards | 27 March 1995 | Best Film Editing | Sally Menke | Nominated | |
| British Academy Film Awards | 1995 | Best Film | Lawrence Bender and Quentin Tarantino | Nominated | |
| British Academy Film Awards | 1995 | Best Direction | Quentin Tarantino | Nominated | |
| British Academy Film Awards | 1995 | Best Original Screenplay | Quentin Tarantino and Roger Avary | Won | |
| British Academy Film Awards | 1995 | Best Cinematography | Andrzej Sekuła | Nominated | |
| British Academy Film Awards | 1995 | Best Actor in a Leading Role | John Travolta | Nominated | |
| British Academy Film Awards | 1995 | Best Actress in a Leading Role | Uma Thurman | Nominated | |
| British Academy Film Awards | 1995 | Best Supporting Actor | Samuel L. Jackson | Won | |
| British Academy Film Awards | 1995 | Best Sound | Rick Ash, Stephen Hunter Flick, Ken King and David Zupancic | Nominated | |
| British Academy Film Awards | 1995 | Best Editing | Sally Menke | Nominated | |
| Cannes Film Festival | 12–23 May 1994 | Palme d'Or | Quentin Tarantino | Won | |
| David di Donatello Awards | 3 June 1995 | Best Foreign Film | Quentin Tarantino | Won | |
| Golden Globe Awards | 21 January 1995 | Best Director | Quentin Tarantino | Nominated | |
| Golden Globe Awards | 21 January 1995 | Best Motion Picture – Drama | Lawrence Bender | Nominated | |
| Golden Globe Awards | 21 January 1995 | Best Screenplay – Motion Picture | Quentin Tarantino | Won | |
| Golden Globe Awards | 21 January 1995 | Best Supporting Actor – Motion Picture | Samuel L. Jackson | Nominated | |
| Golden Globe Awards | 21 January 1995 | Best Actor in a Motion Picture – Drama | John Travolta | Nominated | |
| Golden Globe Awards | 21 January 1995 | Best Supporting Actress – Motion Picture | Uma Thurman | Nominated | |
| Independent Spirit Awards | 25 March 1995 | Best Feature | Lawrence Bender | Won | |
| Independent Spirit Awards | 25 March 1995 | Best Director | Quentin Tarantino | Won | |
| Independent Spirit Awards | 25 March 1995 | Best Male Lead | Samuel L. Jackson | Won | |
| Independent Spirit Awards | 25 March 1995 | Best Screenplay | Quentin Tarantino and Roger Avary | Won | |
| Independent Spirit Awards | 25 March 1995 | Best Supporting Male | Eric Stoltz | Nominated | |
| Los Angeles Film Critics Association Awards | 10 December 1994 | Best Film | Pulp Fiction | Won | |
| Los Angeles Film Critics Association Awards | 10 December 1994 | Best Director | Quentin Tarantino | Won | |
| Los Angeles Film Critics Association Awards | 10 December 1994 | Best Actor | John Travolta | Won | |
| Los Angeles Film Critics Association Awards | 10 December 1994 | Best Supporting Actor | Samuel L. Jackson | Nominated | |
| Los Angeles Film Critics Association Awards | 10 December 1994 | Best Supporting Actress | Uma Thurman | Nominated | |
| Los Angeles Film Critics Association Awards | 10 December 1994 | Best Screenplay | Quentin Tarantino and Roger Avary | Won | |
| MTV Movie & TV Awards | 10 June 1995 | Best Movie | Pulp Fiction | Won | |
| MTV Movie & TV Awards | 10 June 1995 | Best Dance Sequence | Uma Thurman and John Travolta | Won | |
| MTV Movie & TV Awards | 10 June 1995 | Best Female Performance | Uma Thurman | Nominated | |
| MTV Movie & TV Awards | 10 June 1995 | Best Male Performance | John Travolta | Nominated | |
| MTV Movie & TV Awards | 10 June 1995 | Best On-Screen Duo | Samuel L. Jackson and John Travolta | Nominated | |
| MTV Movie & TV Awards | 10 June 1995 | Best Movie Song | For the song "Girl, You'll Be a Woman Soon" | Nominated | |
| National Board of Review Awards | 27 February 1995 | Best Film | Pulp Fiction (Note: Tied with Forrest Gump.) | Won | |
| National Board of Review Awards | 27 February 1995 | Best Director | Quentin Tarantino | Won | |
| National Board of Review Awards | 27 February 1995 | Top Ten Films | Pulp Fiction | Won | |
| National Society of Film Critics | 3 January 1995 | Best Film | Quentin Tarantino | Won | |
| National Society of Film Critics | 3 January 1995 | Best Director | Quentin Tarantino | Won | |
| National Society of Film Critics | 3 January 1995 | Best Screenplay | Quentin Tarantino and Roger Avary | Won | |
| Saturn Awards | 26 June 1995 | Best Action/Adventure/Thriller Film | Pulp Fiction | Won | |
| Screen Actors Guild Awards | February 25, 1995 | Outstanding Performance by a Male Actor in a Leading Role | John Travolta | Nominated | |
| Screen Actors Guild Awards | February 25, 1995 | Outstanding Performance by a Male Actor in a Supporting Role | Samuel L. Jackson | Nominated | |
| Screen Actors Guild Awards | February 25, 1995 | Outstanding Performance by a Female Actor in a Supporting Role | Uma Thurman | Nominated | |

== Year-end lists ==
- 1st – Peter Travers, Rolling Stone
- 1st – Janet Maslin, The New York Times
- 1st – Michael MacCambridge, Austin American-Statesman
- 1st – James Berardinelli, ReelViews
- 1st – National Board of Review
- 1st – Bob Strauss, Los Angeles Daily News
- 1st – Yardena Arar, Los Angeles Daily News
- 1st – David Stupich, The Milwaukee Journal
- 1st – Scott Schuldt, The Oklahoman
- 1st – Steve Persall, St. Petersburg Times
- 1st – Sean P. Means, The Salt Lake Tribune
- 1st – Robert Denerstein, Rocky Mountain News
- 1st – Michael Mills, The Palm Beach Post
- 2nd – Gene Siskel, The Chicago Tribune
- 2nd – Kevin Thomas, Los Angeles Times
- 2nd – Desson Howe, The Washington Post
- 2nd – Christopher Sheid, The Munster Times
- 3rd – Mack Bates, The Milwaukee Journal
- 3rd – Dan Craft, The Pantagraph
- 4th – Stephen Hunter, The Baltimore Sun
- 5th – Glenn Lovell, San Jose Mercury News
- 5th – Douglas Armstrong, The Milwaukee Journal
- 6th – Todd Anthony, Miami New Times
- 9th – John Hurley, Staten Island Advance
- 10th – Joan Vadeboncoeur, Syracuse Herald American
- Top 7 (not ranked) – Duane Dudek, Milwaukee Sentinel
- Top 9 (not ranked) – Dan Webster, The Spokesman-Review
- Top 10 (listed alphabetically, not ranked) – Mike Clark, USA Today
- Top 10 (listed alphabetically, not ranked) – Matt Zoller Seitz, Dallas Observer
- Top 10 (listed alphabetically, not ranked) – Mike Mayo, The Roanoke Times
- Top 10 (listed alphabetically, not ranked) – Bob Ross, The Tampa Tribune
- Top 10 (listed alphabetically, not ranked) – Eleanor Ringel, The Atlanta Journal-Constitution
- Top 10 (listed alphabetically, not ranked) – Steve Murray, The Atlanta Journal-Constitution
- Top 10 (listed alphabetically, not ranked) – Jeff Simon, The Buffalo News
- Top 10 (not ranked) – Howie Movshovitz, The Denver Post
- Top 10 (not ranked) – Betsy Pickle, Knoxville News-Sentinel
- Top 10 (not ranked) – George Meyer, The Ledger
- Top 10 (not ranked) – Dennis King, Tulsa World
- Top 10 (not ranked) – Bob Carlton, The Birmingham News
- Honorable mention – Kenneth Turan, Los Angeles Times
- Honorable mention – David Elliott, The San Diego Union-Tribune
