= Jean Kyoung Frazier =

American novelist & screenwriter (born 1995)

- Born: April 11, 1995 (age 31)
- Education: USC, Columbia University MFA
- Occupation: Writer
- Writing career
- Language: English
- Genre: Fiction
- Notable work: Pizza Girl (2020)
- Website: yayjayfray.com

Jean Kyoung Frazier is a Korean American novelist and screenwriter.

== Work ==
Frazier is the author of the novel Pizza Girl, published by Doubleday in 2020, and a contributor to Unpublishable, an anthology edited by Chris Molnar for Archway Editions. In 2021 Pizza Girl was nominated for the Lambda Literary Award for Lesbian Fiction.

Among other work, she has written for Law & Order: Organized Crime. In 2021 she joined the writing staff of the Netflix show Beef starring Steven Yeun, and Ali Wong. The series debuted on April 6, 2023. In 2023 Frazier joined the writing staff of Lucky Hank starring Bob Odenkirk based on the book Straight Man by Richard Russo. The show debuted on March 11, 2023 on AMC.

== Bibliography ==
=== Fiction ===
- Pizza Girl (2020). Doubleday ISBN 978-0385545723

=== Anthologies ===
- Unpublishable (2020). Archway Editions ISBN 978-1576879719
