= Everybody's Fool (disambiguation) =

Everybody's Fool is a song by Evanescence.

Everybody's Fool may also refer to:

- Everybody's Fool (novel), 2016 novel by Richard Russo, sequel to Russo's 1993 novel Nobody's Fool
- "Everybody's Fool", a single by Teenage Fanclub from A Catholic Education 1990
- "Everybody's Fool", a song by German pop singer Sasha from Good News on a Bad Day 2007
- "Everybody's Fool", a song by Butts Band from Hear and Now (album) 1975
- "Everybody's Fool", a song by Brenda and the Tabulations List of disco artists (A–E) 1979

== See also ==
- "Everybody's Somebody's Fool", No. 1 hit for Connie Francis in 1960
