= Chances Are =

Chances Are may refer to:

== Music ==
- Chances Are (album), a 1981 album by Bob Marley, or the title song
- "Chances Are", a 1926 song written by Barry Harris, Ralph Freed and Gus Arnheim
- "Chances Are" (song), a 1957 song written by Al Stillman and Robert Allen, popularized by Johnny Mathis
- "Chances Are", a song by Bob Seger and Martina McBride from Hope Floats: Music from the Motion Picture, 1998
- "Chances Are", a song by Invertigo from Forum, 2001
- "Chances Are", a song by Sheryl Crow from Wildflower, 2005
- "Chances Are", a song by Stereophonics from Scream Above the Sounds, 2017

== Other uses ==
- Chances Are (film), a 1989 romantic comedy
- Chances Are..., a 2019 novel by Richard Russo
