= Somebody's Fool =

2023 novel by Richard Russo

- Author: Richard Russo
- Language: English
- Genre: Novel
- Publisher: Alfred A. Knopf
- Publication date: July 25, 2023
- Publication place: United States
- Media type: Print (Hardcover)
- Pages: 464
- ISBN: 978-0593317891
- Preceded by: Everybody's Fool

Somebody's Fool is a 2023 novel by American author Richard Russo. It is the third installment in Russo's "North Bath Trilogy", following Nobody’s Fool (1993) and Everybody’s Fool (2016). The book is set in the fictional town of North Bath in Upstate New York, and it continues the storylines of characters from the previous books. Russo explores themes of small-town life, aging, and mortality. The book was published by Alfred A. Knopf to critical success, with a critic from The New York Times calling it Russo's "best book."

== Conception ==
Somebody's Fool is Russo's 10th novel. Russo did not plan to write a second sequel to his original novel, Nobody’s Fool (1993), but he decided to return to the series because he found that the characters connected him with his late father. In an interview, Russo stated:

Sully was based on my father. I had never intended to write the second book in the trilogy much less the third – that was a big time gap. What I discovered in writing that was that I never really got enough of my father. Because my parents split up when I was young, I didn’t spend as much time with my father as I would have liked.

Russo spent about four hours each morning crafting the novel in longhand. In the afternoons, he worked on digitizing and editing. He composed the book during the COVID-19 pandemic and the George Floyd protests. These events influenced the novel's darker themes, including police brutality and race relations. In an interview, Russo reflected, "George Floyd’s murder made me realize I couldn’t write another book with main characters as police officers without addressing the presence of bad cops."

== Plot ==
In this last book of Russo's "Fool's" trilogy, the story returns to North Bath and the characters from the previous two books. The story is set in February 2010 when the fictional town of Schuyler Springs is in the process of annexing neighboring North Bath in the name of reducing expenses. The book opens with the death of Donald "Sully" Sullivan, the main character in previous novels. Sully's son, Peter, struggles with whether to leave North Bath and his decision is complicated by a list of people his father left for him to check on. Doug Raymer retires as chief of police, and his romantic partner and subordinate, Charice Bond, fills his old position.

The storyline mainly follows Peter Sullivan and his relationship with one of his estranged sons, Thomas, who has been raised by his mother and an abusive stepfather in West Virginia. Thomas comes to see Peter, stating that he is stopping by on his way to visit Montreal. In fact, Thomas has come to take revenge on his father, who he blames for his difficult upbringing. While visiting, Thomas gets drunk at a bar, after which he gets a concussion and falls into a coma following a battering by a corrupt police officer. This event discloses Thomas's contemplation of arson against Peter's house. Doug and Charice have been stopped dating, but Doug wishes to get back together with her. They eventually rekindle the romance when Charice badly needs Doug's help in solving the identity of a suicide at the Sans Souci Hotel. Charice, who is black, must also deal with racism and dissension from many of the police officers she oversees.

The novel ends with Thomas waking from the coma and the prospect that what might have gone wrong between Peter and Thomas can be remedied. Doug learns that the victim in the suicide case was a previous mayor. Charice decides to resign from the police force since she plans to go to law school, and both she and Doug resume their relationship. Doug decides to accept an offer to return as the police chief.

== Reception ==
The book received favorable reviews. Hamilton Cain, writing for The New York Times, praised Russo as "paint[ing] a shining fresco of a working-class community, warts and all, a 30-year project come to fruition in this last, best book." Cain admired Russo's skillful handling of third-person narration and the portrayal of multiple perspectives and small-town dynamics. However, he pointed out that some chapters seemed overly detailed and certain flashbacks could be confusing. A review in the Washington Post praised the storyline involving Peter in which he grapples with accepting the man he has become. The critic described this storyline as the most compelling aspect of the book.
