= Aaron Zelman =

American television writer and producer

Aaron Zelman (born January 7, 1973) is an American television writer and producer. He has worked in both capacities on the series Law & Order, Criminal Minds and Damages. He has been nominated for an Emmy Award and a Writers Guild of America Award for his work on Damages. He developed Resurrection for ABC. He co-developed and served as co-showrunner of AMC series Lucky Hank, based on the novel Straight Man by Richard Russo, starring Bob Odenkirk.

== Career ==
Zelman began writing for television with the eleventh season of Law & Order in 2000. He wrote the episodes "Return", "Teenage Wasteland", "White Lie", "Whiplash" and "Judge Dread". He became a story editor for the twelfth season in 2001 and wrote the episodes "Myth of Fingerprints", "3 Dawg Night" and "DR1-102". He was promoted to executive story editor for the thirteenth season in 2002 and wrote the episodes "American Jihad" and "Suicide Box". He became a producer for the fourteenth season in 2003 and wrote the episodes "Blaze", "Ill-Conceived" and "Can I Get a Witness?" He left the series at the end of the fifteenth season.

He worked on the short-lived legal drama Eyes in 2005. The series aired as a mid-season replacement in 2005 and was taken off air after only five of the thirteen produced episodes were aired. The remaining eight episodes were aired in 2007. Zelman wrote the episodes "Burglary" and "Innocence" which did not air until 2007.

He became a supervising producer and writer for the first season of CBS procedural Criminal Minds in 2005. He wrote the first-season episodes "Won't Get Fooled Again", "Poison" and "Machismo". He was promoted to co-executive producer for the second season in 2006. He wrote the episodes "Psychodrama", "Fear and Loathing" and "Honor Among Thieves". He left the series at the end of the second season.

He became a consulting producer and writer for the first season of FX crime drama Damages in 2007. The series was co-created by his brother Daniel Zelman. Zelman wrote the first-season episode "We Are Not Animals". Zelman and the first season writing staff were nominated for the Writers Guild of America Award for best new series. He returned as a co-executive producer for the second season in 2009 and wrote the episodes "Hey! Mr. Pibb!" and "They Had to Tweeze That Out of My Kidney". Zelman and the second season production staff were nominated for the Emmy Award for best drama series in 2009. He remained a co-executive producer for the third season in 2010 and wrote the episode "The Dog Is Happier Without Her" and co-wrote the episode "Don't Forget to Thank Mr. Zedeck" with co-producer Mark Fish. He graduated from Harvard College.
