= Mohawk (novel) =

1986 novel by Richard Russo

- First edition cover with quote by John Irving
- Author: Richard Russo
- Language: English
- Publisher: Vintage Books
- Publication date: 1986
- Publication place: United States
- Media type: Print (hardback & paperback)
- Pages: 418 pp
- ISBN: 0-394-74409-8 (1st edition)
- OCLC: 46946938
- Dewey Decimal: 813/.54 21
- LC Class: PS3568.U812 M6 2001

Mohawk (1986) is the debut novel by American author Richard Russo.

== Plot ==
The book is set in Mohawk, an upstate New York mill town in a decline following that of its leather tanning industry. The Mohawk Grill, a diner run by Harry Saunders, is featured. The novel explores the lives of two intersecting families, the Grouses and the Gaffneys.

Anne Grouse is the 40-year-old daughter of Mather Grouse and his wife, and lives with her parents and son Randall after her divorce from Dallas Younger, her high-school sweetheart. He is a good-hearted but unreliable auto-mechanic. Anne is in love with Dan, the husband of her cousin Diana. He became paralyzed after a car accident.

The relationship between Mather and fellow leather-worker Rory Gaffney provides tension and suspense in the story.

Randall befriends Rory's mentally disabled son Bill, who is in love with Anne Grouse. Following his grandfather Mather's death, Randall returns to Mohawk, after having dropped out of college to avoid the draft. He meets Rory's granddaughter B.G., who falls in love with him. The story climaxes with Randall being accused of murder after three Gaffneys lie dead.

== Reception ==
Greg Johnson in The New York Times writes,

"Despite its byzantine plot, the novel delineates good and evil along simplistic lines. . . . There's an attractive, small-town coziness to much of the story, though . . . The writing, moreover, is brisk, colorful and often witty. These qualities and the impressive scope of the novel bode well for Richard Russo's future, but the initially strong sympathy he evokes for his characters is gradually lost in the complex windings of plot and structure."

Kirkus Reviews said, "Workmanlike writing for lovers of the well-atmosphered small-town saga with not a cliche unturned. For those idle hours between daytime soaps."
