= Lucky Hank =

American television series

- Premiere poster
- Genre: Comedy-drama
- Based on: Straight Man by Richard Russo
- Developed by: Paul Lieberstein; Aaron Zelman
- Starring: Bob Odenkirk; Mireille Enos; Cedric Yarbrough; Diedrich Bader; Olivia Scott Welch; Sara Amini; Suzanne Cryer
- Narrated by: Bob Odenkirk
- Composers: Joe Wong; Dave Porter
- Country of origin: United States
- Original language: English
- No. of seasons: 1
- No. of episodes: 8

Production
- Executive producers: Paul Lieberstein; Aaron Zelman; Bob Odenkirk; Peter Farrelly; Mark Johnson; Richard Russo; Naomi Odenkirk; Marc Provissiero; Jessica Held
- Production locations: Vancouver, British Columbia, Canada
- Cinematography: Mark Chow
- Running time: 40–47 minutes
- Production companies: Afternoon Nap; Ponyboy Productions; Gran Via Productions; Le Foole Inc.; AMC Studios; TriStar Television

Original release
- Network: AMC
- Release: March 19 – May 7, 2023

Lucky Hank is an American comedy-drama television series developed by Paul Lieberstein and Aaron Zelman based on the 1997 novel Straight Man by Richard Russo. Starring Bob Odenkirk, the series premiered on March 19, 2023, on AMC. It received positive reviews from critics, but in December 2023, the show was canceled after one season.

== Synopsis ==
An English department chairman at an underfunded Pennsylvania college, Professor Hank Devereaux walks the line between midlife crisis and full-blown meltdown, navigating the offbeat chaos in his personal and professional lives.

== Cast and characters ==
=== Main ===
- Bob Odenkirk as William Henry "Hank" Devereaux, Jr.
- Mireille Enos as Lily Devereaux
- Cedric Yarbrough as Paul Rourke
- Diedrich Bader as Tony Conigula
- Olivia Scott Welch as Julie Devereaux
- Sara Amini as Meg Quigley
- Suzanne Cryer as Gracie DuBois

=== Recurring ===
- Nancy Robertson as Billie Quigley
- Arthur Keng as Teddy Washington-Chen
- Alvina August as June Washington-Chen
- Haig Sutherland as Finny
- Shannon DeVido as Emma Wheemer
- Jackson Kelly as Bartow Williams-Stevens
- Daniel Doheny as Russell
- Oscar Nuñez as Dean Jacob Rose
- Anne Gee Byrd as Laurel Devereaux
- Glynis Davies as Leslie

=== Guest ===
- Brian Huskey as George Saunders
- Kyle MacLachlan as Dickie Pope
- Chris Gethard as Jeffrey Epstein
- Chris Diamantopoulos as Tom Loring
- Jennifer Spence as Ashley
- Tom Bower as Henry Devereaux Sr.
- Catherine Keener as herself

== Episodes ==
No.	Title	Directed by	Teleplay by	Original release date	U.S. viewers (millions)
1	"Pilot"	Peter Farrelly	Paul Lieberstein & Aaron Zelman	March 19, 2023	0.300
William Henry "Hank" Devereaux Jr. is a struggling writer and bored creative writing professor at Railton College in Pennsylvania and chair of the bickering and backstabbing English department. In class, a student tries to get Hank's opinion by provoking him. Hank starts ranting about the college, calling the whole institution "Mediocrity's Capital". This outburst gets published in the press, spreading around campus. Hank is called in front of Dean Rose for his rant and proposes cutting Hank's department budget. Hank faces a department vote of no-confidence, which he loses, but accidentally gets re-elected chair after a re-vote. Hank's estranged father, Henry Deveraux Sr., a more successful novelist and academic, announces retirement. Hank's wife, Lily, sees Hank carrying the article around and accuses Hank of trying to get fired. Lily gets an opportunity to get a job from the Arlyle school in New York, but Hank wavers on wanting to move.
2	"George Saunders"	Peter Farrelly	Paul Lieberstein & Aaron Zelman	March 26, 2023	0.315
Hank's old friend and peer George Saunders visits Railton to give a talk, causing the professors to scramble as they try to impress the celebrated writer. George's success reminds Hank of his own failed writing career and George asks him why he stopped writing as he sits in on Hank's writers' workshop. Hank and Lily anticipate a pregnancy announcement from their daughter Julie, but she and her husband Russell want to start a swimming pool construction app and need financial backing. Hank is disappointed and asks Meg to get Russell a 'real job' at the bar. George's talk is about to begin, but Hank is too drunk to moderate and Lily sends him home. Hank goes to a field hockey game instead and finds Tony. Tony jokingly tells Hank to confront George about insulting him only for Hank to find out that George respects Hank as a writer and has read his book. Hank feels reprieve and moderates the talk with George.
3	"Escape"	Dan Attias	Adam Barr	April 2, 2023	0.294
A storage container, sent from Henry Sr., arrives at the house, blocking the driveway. Henry's assistant informs an irate Hank of his father's upcoming arrival. Hank opens the container and discovers letters between his mother Laurel and Henry Sr. She reveals she invited him to stay with her and they have been in regular contact despite her saying otherwise. Hank leaves a voicemail for his father telling him to stay away from Railton. Later, fighting with Julie, he hints for her to leave town. A student at Lily's school urinates in the corridor. After the janitor refuses, Lily cleans it up. Later, Principal Jack denies her reimbursement for the cleaning supplies. Hank is pressured to make faculty cuts, in response, the staff try to unionize. Meg convinces a reluctant Hank to endorse her for a tenure-track position. Hank reveals to Meg the extent of cuts, trying to convince her to spread her wings. Meg feels compelled to stay for her mother, Billie. Hank and Meg get drunk and Meg attempts to seduce him. Hank leaves Meg's house and confesses this to Lily. She decides to interview at a school in New York.
4	"The Goose Boxer"	Dan Attias	Emma Barrie	April 9, 2023	0.312
Lily leaves for New York, not before warning Hank that she fears he will end up dead or in jail while she's away. Hank meets with Railton College President Dickie Pope, who questions why he has not submitted a staffing cut list. Hank is concerned the cuts will be funding the new Jeffrey Epstein Technical Centre. Paul remands Hank for not consulting the department before this meeting and the English department plan to demonstrate at the Epstein Centre ceremony. Lily's acquaintance Tom, at the Arlyle school, is dismayed to hear she isn't really interested in the job due to not wanting to move. At drinks with Lily and friends, Tom reveals the job wasn't really available. History between Lily and Tom is implied. Hank asks Tony whether he is boring Lily and they stumble on Epstein checking out the building site. It turns out he isn't the infamous Jeffrey Epstein, rather a wealthy air fryer manufacturer. He reveals that Pope promised $10 million off the building budget to change his name to Jeffrey Q. Epstein, trying to remove the association. With the building opening starting, a goose annoys Hank. He starts boxing it, playfully. The press covering the opening, train their cameras on Hank. He seizes the moment, shouting "I will box a goose a day" until they get their budget back. This starts a faculty chant, disrupting the event, and the faculty invite Hank to celebratory drinks with them afterwards where they watch Hank's protest on the news. Lily calls Hank telling him she will be late whilst on the phone, Tom kisses her. As they return to the table, she announces how inappropriate it was and leaves. As Hank tries to leave the bar a man starts a fight with him. Both of them, plus Tony, end up in jail. Lily leaves a voicemail to Hank in jail cell saying she is staying in New York.
5	"The Clock"	Jude Weng	Jean Kyoung Frazier	April 16, 2023	0.234
Tom calls Lily to offer her the job. She tries talking Hank into moving to New York, but he is reluctant. The Deverauxs throw a dinner party for the English department faculty. Hank decides to bring his father's grandfather clock from the container inside. Tony, who Hank asks to come over to help move the clock inside, stays for dinner and flirts with June, later propositioning her and Teddy's open marriage. Gracie announces she is to be published in The Atlantic. Hank sees a text from Tom to Lily and she admits Tom kissed her. Hank uses their daughter as a last weapon to prevent Lily from taking the job only to infuriate her. Over dinner everybody tries to convince Hank to move, including Paul, who opens up about how a long-distance relationship led to the marriage with his current wife. Hank refuses, eventually breaking down, prematurely ending the evening. Flashbacks reveal Hank tried to kill himself when his father moved but he never shares this with Lily.
6	"The Arrival"	Jude Weng	Jasmine Pierce	April 23, 2023	0.367
Hank watches his father Henry arrive in Railton. His mother Laurel tries to convince him to visit, but he chooses instead to go to a conference with Tony, where Gracie is in attendance. In the hotel sauna, Hank hallucinates Henry Sr. Later he decides to party with Tony, where he spreads rumors of a computer virus. Hank has eyes for Anna Hibble, who studied under his father, and had an affair with him. At breakfast, he asks her about his father and she says he should talk to him. Tony's talk, which Hank misses while playing in the hotel gym, is a disaster. He and Hank then have a fight. After a fight with Russell, Julie wants to move to New York with Lily. Lily tries to mediate Julie and Russell, but has the tables turned to her relationship with Hank. Hank returns and promises Lily he'll change, but not before seeing his father. They talk, but as he tries to question his father, Hank realizes Henry has dementia.
7	"The Count of Monte Cristo"	Nicole Holofcener	Taylor Brogan	April 30, 2023	0.339
Lily leaves for New York to scout out apartments. Hank falls into a depression, avoiding the leaking sink and leaving food around the house. Tony drops off a chainsaw, attempting to make up. They go for a walk and he motivates Hank to fix the sink. Hank finds his father walking and brings him to college where he entertains the department. The department wants to strike, but Hank refuses to get involved. Gracie is called in front of Dean Rose. He says he has asked his wife for a divorce and asks her to move to Florida with him. A real estate agent asks Lily her perfect day. She is embarrassed later to realize she didn't include any family in the fantasy. At the cafe, she is accidentally sat with a man hiding from the husband of the woman he is having an affair with. Lily play acts wanting to divorce the man, imagining he is Hank, and leaves. Julie starts worrying about Russell after he didn't come home. After Hank discovers Meg knew of his lie about her tenure, he talks with her and discovers Russell in her bed. Russell runs off and Hank goes to comfort Julie.
8	"The Chopping Block"	Nicole Holofcener	Paul Lieberstein & Aaron Zelman	May 7, 2023	0.260
President Pope forces cuts while Hank threatens information in relation to Jeffery Epstein. Julie is staying with Hank and Lily. Russell tries to win her back with flowers, she gets angry and throws a bottle of wine into the drywall. Hank struggles coming up with a staff cutting list and tries to ask his assistant and Billie who they would fire. Gracie has sex with Dean Rose and returns to find the whole department headed for the bar. Hank confronts Meg over sleeping with Russell, accusing her of trying to hurt him. Jeffrey Epstein and Dean Rose arrive, who informs everyone that Finny, Emma, and Billie are to be fired. Tony invites everyone to a sad hot tub party where Epstein and Rose realize that President Pope has violated his fiduciary duty gutting the school budget in order to get a job at MIT. He is promptly fired by the Board of Trustees. Julie tells Hank she thinks he and Lily are separated. Later, she and Russell tentatively make up. Hank celebrates the college victory with his parents. His father reveals he lied in a publication in order to be asked to appear on panels at conferences because, "What else is there?" Hank realizes Henry is empty. He resigns from college and drives to New York where Lily greets him, privately conflicted.

== Production ==
=== Development ===
The series was originally announced to be in development at AMC and TriStar Television in April 2022 under the name of the book it was based on, with Aaron Zelman and Paul Lieberstein as showrunners and Bob Odenkirk as executive producer in addition to starring. Two weeks later, the project had been given an eight-episode series order. In January 2023, the series was renamed Lucky Hank, and the first images were released. On December 8, 2023, AMC canceled the series after one season.

=== Casting ===
After Odenkirk's involvement was announced with the show itself, in August 2022, it was reported that Mireille Enos joined the cast. The following month, she was joined by Olivia Scott Welch, Diedrich Bader, Sara Amini, Cedric Yarbrough and Suzanne Cryer. It was later announced that Alvina August and Arthur Keng would join the cast as married professors, June and Teddy Washington-Chen.

In January 2023, it was announced that Oscar Nuñez, Kyle MacLachlan, Tom Bower, and Chris Diamantopoulos would join the cast as guest stars.

=== Filming ===
Filming of the first season of Lucky Hank took place from September 2022 to December in various locations around Greater Vancouver, Canada, including the Municipal Hall and Ladner Leisure Centre in Delta, British Columbia.

== Release ==
Lucky Hank was announced as part of AMC's spring 2023 programming slate. On January 10, 2023, a specific premiere date of March 19, 2023, was announced. The series had its first screening at the 2023 SXSW Festival on March 11, 2023.

== Reception ==
The review aggregator website Rotten Tomatoes has reported a 93% approval rating, with an average rating of 7.5/10, based on 44 critic reviews. The website's critics consensus reads, "With the fortune of Bob Odenkirk in its favor, Lucky Hank makes ennui essential viewing with a comedy rooted in relatable human behavior". Metacritic, which uses a weighted average, has assigned a score of 70 out of 100 based on 25 critics, indicating "generally favorable reviews".
