= Still of the Night (film) =

1982 film by Robert Benton

- Theatrical release poster
- Directed by: Robert Benton
- Screenplay by: Robert Benton
- Story by: Robert Benton; David Newman
- Produced by: Arlene Donovan
- Starring: Roy Scheider; Meryl Streep; Jessica Tandy; Josef Sommer
- Cinematography: Néstor Almendros
- Edited by: Gerald B. Greenberg; Bill Pankow
- Music by: John Kander
- Production company: United Artists
- Distributed by: Metro-Goldwyn-Mayer
- Release date: November 19, 1982
- Running time: 91 minutes
- Country: United States
- Language: English
- Budget: $10 million
- Box office: $5,979,947 (domestic)

Still of the Night is a 1982 American neo-noir psychological thriller film written and directed by Robert Benton, based on a story by Benton and David Newman, and starring Roy Scheider, Meryl Streep, Joe Grifasi, and Jessica Tandy. Scheider plays a psychiatrist who falls in love with a woman (Streep) who may be the psychopathic killer of one of his patients.

The film is considered as an overt homage to the films of Alfred Hitchcock, emulating scenes from many of his movies: a bird attacks one character (as in The Birds), a scene takes place in an auction (as in North by Northwest), someone falls from a height (as in Vertigo and a number of other films), stuffed birds occupy a room (as in Psycho), and an important plot point is the interpretation of a dream (as in Spellbound). Meryl Streep's hair is styled much like Eva Marie Saint's was in North by Northwest, and the city of Glen Cove, New York is featured in both films. Jessica Tandy also is featured in this film, as she was in The Birds (1963), as the mother of the protagonist.

== Plot ==
Manhattan psychiatrist Dr. Sam Rice is visited by glamorous, enigmatic Brooke Reynolds, who works at Crispin's (a fictitious New York auction house modeled after Christie's). Brooke was having an affair with one of Rice's patients, George Bynum, who has just been murdered. Brooke asks the doctor to return a watch to Bynum's wife and not reveal the affair.

Sam is visited by NYPD Detective Joseph Vitucci but refuses to give any information on Bynum, a patient for two years. After the police warn him that he could become a target because the killer may believe he knows something, Sam reviews the case files detailing Bynum's affairs with various women at Crispin's, including Brooke. Bynum had also expressed concern, claiming a wealthy friend had once killed someone, and Bynum was the only person who knew about this. He wondered if this friend might kill again.

The police believe Bynum's killer is a woman. Sam gradually falls for Brooke but believes he is being followed. He is mugged by someone who takes his coat, whereupon the mugger is killed in the same manner as Bynum.

Sam tries to interpret clues from the case file with his psychiatrist mother, Grace. This includes a strange dream of Bynum's in which he finds a green box in a cabinet in a dark house, and sees a little girl with a bleeding teddy bear, who then follows him up a narrow staircase.

Brooke's behavior becomes increasingly suspicious. Sam tails her to a family estate on Long Island. She explains her guilt in the accidental death of her father, and claims Bynum threatened to reveal this secret if she broke off their affair.

Sam pieces together that Bynum's previous girlfriend was Gail Phillips, an assistant to Bynum at Crispin's. Gail blames Brooke for her breakup with Bynum. Gail, trying to frame Brooke, kills Det. Vitucci. Now she arrives at the estate to kill Brooke and Sam.

As they are about to leave, Brooke forgets her keys and goes back into the dark house, alone, to retrieve them, while Sam waits in his car. Gail appears in the back seat of the car and stabs Sam with a knife. Gail chases Brooke through the house, recapitulating Bynum's dream. As Gail is about to stab Brooke, the wounded Sam appears from the staircase. In the ensuing struggle, Gail falls to her death over a railing, reminiscent of Brooke's father's death. Sam and Brooke embrace in the final scene.

== Cast ==
- Roy Scheider as Dr. Sam Rice
- Meryl Streep as Brooke Reynolds
- Jessica Tandy as Dr. Grace Rice
- Joe Grifasi as Joseph Vitucci
- Sara Botsford as Gail Phillips
- Josef Sommer as George Bynum
- Rikke Borge as Heather Wilson
- Irving Metzman as Murray Gordon
- Larry Joshua as Mugger
- Tom Norton as Auctioneer
- Richmond Hoxie as Mr. Harris
- Hyon Cho as Mr. Chang
- Danielle Cusson as Girl
- John Eric Bentley as Night Watchman
- George A. Tooks as Elevator Operator

== Production ==
Still of the Night was filmed in and around New York City during March 1981. Some scenes were shot at Columbia University, the Trefoil Arch and the Boathouse Cafe in Central Park, and the Museum of the City of New York.

Art dealer Arne Glimcher served as a consultant on the film and helped choreograph the auction scene (as well as playing a cameo role as an art dealer who is one of the bidders). Thomas E. Norton, who had been a long-time executive at Sotheby's, served as a consultant for the film. (He also played the auctioneer taking bids during the Crispin's auction scene.) The auction scene was filmed in the auditorium of the International House of New York.

== Reception ==
The film had a platform release on five screens and grossed $548,255 before going wide on 502 screens on December 17, 1982, but it disappointed with only $633,273 for the weekend. Altogether, the film made $5,979,947 domestically, on a budget of $10 million.

Still of the Night holds an aggregate score of 67% fresh on the website Rotten Tomatoes from 9 reviews.

A review in Variety stated: "It comes as almost a shock to see a modern suspense picture that's as literate, well acted and beautifully made as Still of The Night. Despite its many virtues, however, Robert Benton's film [...] has its share of serious flaws, mainly in the area of plotting".

In his review for The New York Times, Vincent Canby said that the screenplay "makes inescapable references to such Hitchcock classics as Vertigo, Rear Window, North by Northwest, and Spellbound, among others."

In 2013, Meryl Streep named it when asked on TV to name a bad film in which she had acted.
