= Nobody's Fool (novel) =

1993 novel by Richard Russo

- First edition cover
- Author: Richard Russo
- Language: English
- Genre: Literary fiction
- Publisher: Vintage Books
- Publication date: 1993
- Media type: Print
- Pages: 549
- ISBN: 978-0679753339
- Dewey Decimal: 813/.54
- LC Class: PS3568.U812 N6 1994

Nobody's Fool is a novel by American author Richard Russo that was published by Vintage Books in 1993. The plot revolves around small-town life in the fictional town of North Bath in Upstate New York. Themes covered in the book include responsibility, forgiveness, and community. The book received favorable reviews, and it was adapted into a 1994 movie, also called Nobody's Fool, starring Paul Newman. Russo has written two sequels to the novel: Everybody's Fool (2016) and Somebody's Fool (2023).

== Plot ==
Donald "Sully" Sullivan is the main character in this novel, set in the small, fictional town of North Bath. Sully is often down on his luck, with an arthritic knee and a vengeful ex-wife. He lives in an upstairs apartment in the house of Beryl Peoples, his former teacher in junior high school; although Beryl's son, Clive, wants to evict Sully. To make a living, Sully works odd jobs, often in construction, with his simple-minded friend, Rub Squeers. Conflict arises when Sully's estranged son, Peter, comes back to North Bath. Peter's return was prompted by his failure to receive tenure as a university professor and his subsequent joblessness. Sully and Peter struggle to reconnect, and Sully must reckon with his absence as a father during his son's childhood. Meanwhile, Rub is upset that he gets to spend less time with Sully following Peter's arrival. The characters also include Doug Raymer, a police officer who experiences frequent run-ins with Sully.

== Reception ==
Writing for The New York Times, Francine Prose praised the dialogue in Nobody's Fool and Russo's exploration of human character. She also liked the many themes covered in the novel, including responsibility, community, and forgiveness. Prose, however, criticized the book as too long and as containing an overabundance of characters and subplots. In the Portland Press Herald, Michael Berry described Nobody's Fool as "capturing with humor and compassion some pivotal moments in the lives of fictional North Bath’s working-class residents". A critic from Krikus Reviews disliked the novel, calling Russo's detailed rendition of small-town life "too much of a good thing".

== Sequels and adaptations ==
Russo has published two sequels to Nobody's Fool–– Everybody's Fool (2016) and Somebody's Fool (2023)–– that continue the plots of several characters, including Sully and Doug Raymer. In Everybody's Fool, Raymer tries to identify his wife's lover, while Sully experiences declining health. The final book in the trilogy, Somebody's Fool, focus on Peter's challenges with his own son, and it features the death of Sully. The Fool's trilogy has received praise. Talking about the series, Ron Charles of The Washington Post wrote, "Russo has become our national priest of masculine despair and redemption.".

Director Robert Benton adapted Nobody's Fool into a comedy-drama film, released in December 1995. The film starred Paul Newman as Sully, along with Jessica Tandy, Bruce Willis, and Philip Seymour Hoffman. The film was positively received for bringing Russo's characters to life.
