= That Old Cape Magic =

2009 novel by Richard Russo

- First edition cover
- Author: Richard Russo
- Audio read by: Arthur Morey
- Publisher: Knopf
- Publication date: August 6, 2009
- Media type: Print
- Pages: 272
- ISBN: 978-0-375-41496-1

That Old Cape Magic is a 2009 novel by American author Richard Russo. The audiobook was narrated by Arthur Morey.

== Plot ==
The story revolves around a past-middle-age former Hollywood screenwriter, Jack Griffin, who is presently teaching creative writing at a New England college. He loses both parents within a year of each other, and he travels considerable distance to attend two weddings during the same time. As he travels, and as he interacts both with his family and his in-laws, he ponders marital and family relationships. He is also mulling whether to remain in New England or return to the uncertainty of Hollywood.

== Reviews ==
Kyle Smith, a film critic for the New York Post, quotes a scene from the book:

"At her retirement party, a college professor rises to tell her colleagues: 'I wish I could think of something nice to say about you people and this university. I really do. But the truth we dare not utter is that ours is a distinctly second-rate institution, as are the vast majority of our students, as are we.'"

Mr. Smith says that scene "is, like so many in Richard Russo's writing, both cheerfully impertinent and stingingly true."

Erin Adair-Hodges of Weekly Alibi writes:

"Russo isn't concerned with the psychological or stylistic fads of the moment. He is a clean writer who relishes the creation of characters who are flawed and smart enough to know it. Though That Old Cape Magic is a lighter entry than his previous books—both in terms of length and scope (no shifting perspective or cast of dozens)—it is, like all of his work, honest."
