= Bridge of Sighs (novel) =

Novel by Richard Russo (2007)

- First edition cover
- Author: Richard Russo
- Language: English
- Genre: Literary fiction
- Publisher: Alfred A. Knopf
- Publication date: 2007
- Media type: Print
- Pages: 527 pages
- ISBN: 978-0679753339
- Dewey Decimal: 813/.54
- LC Class: PS3568.U812 B75 2007

Bridge of Sighs is a 2007 novel written by American author Richard Russo. The book centers on small-town life in Upstate New York, similar to other novels published by Russo. It was published by Alfred A. Knopf to favorable reviews.

== Plot summary ==
The novel is set in a small, fictional town in upstate New York called Thomaston. Like Empire Falls, the town is quickly deteriorating. The story is about Louis Charles ("Lucy") Lynch, his family, his wife, and his best friend, Bobby Marconi. Sixty-year-old Lou Lynch has cheerfully spent his entire life in Thomaston, New York, married to the same woman, Sarah. He is the proprietor of three convenience stores.

== Reception ==
In The New York Times, critic Janet Maslin called the novel "richly evocative and beautifully wrought, delivered with deceptive ease". Another reviewer for the Times, Stephen Metcalf, criticized some aspects of the novel, writing that the character arc of Bobby Marconi strained credulity. DJ Taylor of the Guardian also found some of the characters unconvincing, though he called the novel "beautifully done".
