= Nobody's Fool (1994 film) =

- Theatrical release poster
- Directed by: Robert Benton
- Written by: Robert Benton
- Based on: Nobody's Fool by Richard Russo
- Produced by: Arlene Donovan; Scott Rudin
- Starring: Paul Newman; Jessica Tandy; Melanie Griffith
- Cinematography: John Bailey
- Edited by: John Bloom
- Music by: Howard Shore
- Distributed by: Paramount Pictures (USA & Canada); Capella Films (International)
- Release dates: December 23, 1994 (limited); January 13, 1995 (North America)
- Running time: 110 minutes
- Country: United States
- Language: English
- Budget: $20 million
- Box office: $39.5 million

Nobody's Fool is a 1994 American comedy-drama film written and directed by Robert Benton, based on the 1993 novel of the same name by Richard Russo. It stars Paul Newman, Bruce Willis, Jessica Tandy and Melanie Griffith, as well as Dylan Walsh, Pruitt Taylor Vince, Gene Saks, Josef Sommer, Philip Seymour Hoffman and Philip Bosco.

It was Paramount's final production under its Paramount Communications ownership (being sold to the original Viacom in July 1994). For his performance, Newman received nominations for the Academy Award for Best Actor and Screen Actors Guild Award for Outstanding Performance by a Male Actor in a Leading Role as well as for the Golden Globe Award for Best Actor – Motion Picture Drama, in addition to a nomination for Best Adapted Screenplay for Benton at the 67th Academy Awards.

It was the final film featuring Jessica Tandy, who died on September 11, 1994, before the film was released.

== Plot ==
Donald "Sully" Sullivan is a stubborn old reprobate living in the New York State village of North Bath. He freelances in the construction business, usually with his dim-witted friend Rub by his side. He is often at odds with Carl Roebuck, a local contractor, suing him at every opportunity for unpaid wages and disability. Sully's one-legged lawyer Wirf is inept, and his lawsuits are repeatedly dismissed. As a way to irritate him, Sully openly flirts with Carl's wife Toby (which she enjoys). He is a regular at the Iron Horse Saloon, where he has drinks and plays cards with Wirf, Carl, Rub, Jocko the town pharmacist, and Ollie Quinn, the town's Chief of Police.

A running joke is the repeated theft of Carl's snowblower. Sully steals it to get back at Carl for his latest failed lawsuit. Carl steals it back, placing it in the yard at his construction business guarded by his doberman pinscher dog. Sully, after drugging the dog, steals it a second time. Carl takes it back a final time and leaves the dog, who is now skittish due to his drugging, at Sully's childhood home for him to find.

Sully is a tenant in the home of the elderly Miss Beryl, his 8th grade teacher, whose banker son Clive Jr. urges her to kick him out and sell the house. Family complications develop for Sully with a visit from Peter, his estranged son who is a jobless professor at odds with his wife. While he and Sully reconstruct their relationship, Sully begins a new one with his young grandson, Will. Peter's sudden everyday presence does not sit well with Rub, who quits working with Sully. Meanwhile, Clive Jr. is on the verge of a lucrative deal to build an amusement park in North Bath. However, the deal falls through when the promoter turns out to be a con man, and Clive Jr. skips town in shame since he used his bank's resources to help finance the amusement park.

Sully is jailed for punching a police officer who has been hassling him, Sully has bad luck. His regular horse racing trifecta wins, but because he was in jail, he missed making the bet. But his son and grandson warm up to him, and he rebuilds his relationship with Rub. Then Toby leaves Carl, mostly due to his womanizing, and invites Sully to run away with her to Hawaii. Sully accepts, then realizes he cannot leave his grandson and declines. Miss Beryl, as a gift, pays the back taxes on Sully's long-abandoned family home. His son gives him a winning ticket for the missing trifecta, which he had bet in his father's absence. In the end, Sully decides to remain in North Bath because of his family obligations.

== Cast ==
- Paul Newman as Donald "Sully" Sullivan
- Jessica Tandy as Beryl Peoples
- Bruce Willis as Carl Roebuck
- Melanie Griffith as Toby Roebuck
- Dylan Walsh as Peter Sullivan
- Pruitt Taylor Vince as "Rub" Squeers
- Gene Saks as "Wirf" Wirfley
- Josef Sommer as Clive Peoples Jr.
- Philip Seymour Hoffman as Officer Raymer
- Angelica Torn as Ruby
- Jay Patterson as Jocko
- Philip Bosco as Judge Flatt
- Catherine Dent as Charlotte Sullivan
- Margo Martindale as "Birdy"
- Shannah Laumeister Stern as Didi
- Alexander Goodwin as Will

== Production ==
The setting for both the book and film, the fictional North Bath, New York, is based on the real Village of Ballston Spa, New York, in Saratoga County, New York, just east of Gloversville, where Russo grew up. The real Ballston Spa was overshadowed by neighboring Saratoga Springs, just as North Bath was eclipsed by the fictional Schuyler Springs. Nobody's Fool was filmed in the Hudson Valley city of Beacon, which was paid a $40,000 location fee for services and inconveniences. Production began in November 1993 and concluded in February 1994. The Iron Horse Bar, located on N. 7th Street in Hudson, NY, is now the Governor's Tavern; and the Diner is now The Hudson Diner on Warren Street, just around the corner in Hudson.

Bruce Willis reportedly agreed to a substantial pay cut to appear in the film, accepting the SAG-AFTRA scale of $1,400 per week at a time when the actor was earning roughly $15 million for his action movies, since Willis was very eager to star alongside Paul Newman. Fearing that Willis' fame as action star could lead people into the film with false expectations, the film wasn't advertised with him and his name does not appear in the opening credits, only in the closing credits.

== Reception ==
=== Box office ===
Nobody's Fool was given a limited release on December 23, 1994, earning $92,838 in six theaters. The film was given a wide release on January 13, 1995, earning $7,142,691 over its opening weekend in 792 theaters. The film ultimately grossed $39,491,975 in the US and Canada.

=== Critical response ===
Nobody's Fool was well received by film critics. Leonard Maltin gave the film 3 ½ out of 4 stars in his Movie Guide: "An irresistibly appealing Newman is surrounded by wonderful actors in this charmingly unpredictable character study..." Todd McCarthy of Variety wrote: "Nobody's Fool is a gentle, flavorsome story of a loose-knit, dysfunctional family whose members essentially include every glimpsed citizen of a small New York town. Fronted by a splendid performance from Paul Newman as a spirited man who has made nothing of his life, Robert Benton's character-driven film is sprinkled with small pleasures; the dramatic developments here don't take place in the noisy, calamitous manner that is customary these days. Desson Howe of The Washington Post similarly remarked: "Nobody's Fool is so eloquently straightforward, it practically sings to the soul. A story about very real people caught in the everyday woes and worries of a small Upstate New York town, it shows the kind of character traits, tics and from-the-heart chatter you wish there was more of in the movies. Jonathan Rosenbaum of The Chicago Reader also wrote: "This is the first Robert Benton movie I've really liked — and possibly my favorite Paul Newman performance since The Hustler. Conceived somewhat in the spirit of Chekhov's stories, Nobody's Fool ambles along semiplotlessly, focusing on the petty love-hatreds that link people together in small towns and the everyday orneriness that keeps them alive...it has both the poetry and the authenticity of failure."

Paul Newman was particularly praised by critics. Caryn James of The New York Times described the star's performance as "the single best of this year and among the finest he has ever given". Roger Ebert of the Chicago Sun-Times wrote: "I have been watching Paul Newman in movies all of my life. He is so much a part of the landscape of modern American film that sometimes he is almost invisible: He does what he does with simplicity, grace and a minimum of fuss, and so I wonder if people even realize what a fine actor he is.

The film maintains a 91% rating on the review aggregator Rotten Tomatoes based on reviews from 58 critics. The site's consensus states: "It's solidly directed by Robert Benton and stacked with fine performances from an impressive cast, but above all, Nobody's Fool is a showcase for some of Paul Newman's best late-period work." On Metacritic the film has a score of 86 out of 100 based on reviews from 28 critics.

=== Accolades ===
Award	Category	Nominee(s)	Result
20/20 Awards	Best Actor	Paul Newman	Nominated
20/20 Awards	Best Adapted Screenplay	Robert Benton	Nominated
Academy Awards	Best Actor	Paul Newman	Nominated
Academy Awards	Best Screenplay – Based on Material Previously Produced or Published	Robert Benton	Nominated
Berlin International Film Festival	Golden Bear	Robert Benton	Nominated
Berlin International Film Festival	Best Actor	Paul Newman	Won
Chlotrudis Awards	Best Supporting Actor	Bruce Willis	Nominated
Golden Globe Awards	Best Actor in a Motion Picture – Drama	Paul Newman	Nominated
Humanitas Prize	Feature Film	Robert Benton	Nominated
National Board of Review Awards	Top Ten Films		7th Place
National Society of Film Critics Awards	Best Actor	Paul Newman	Won
New York Film Critics Circle Awards	Best Actor	Paul Newman	Won
Retirement Research Foundation	Theatrical Film Fiction	Arlene Donovan, Michael Hausman and Scott Rudin	Won
Screen Actors Guild Awards	Outstanding Performance by a Male Actor in a Leading Role	Paul Newman	Nominated
USC Scripter Awards		Robert Benton (screenwriter); Richard Russo (author)	Nominated

==== Year-end lists ====
- 3rd – John Hurley, Staten Island Advance
- 5th – Michael MacCambridge, Austin American-Statesman
- 7th – National Board of Review
- 10th – Janet Maslin, The New York Times
- Top 10 (listed alphabetically, not ranked) – Jimmy Fowler, Dallas Observer
- Top 10 (listed alphabetically, not ranked) – Bob Ross, The Tampa Tribune
- "The second 10" (not ranked) – Sean P. Means, The Salt Lake Tribune
- Honorable mention – Glenn Lovell, San Jose Mercury News
- Honorable mention – Jeff Simon, The Buffalo News
