= Arlene Donovan =

American film producer (1927–2024)

- Born: July 15, 1927; Newark, New Jersey, U.S.
- Died: February 14, 2024 (aged 96)
- Other names: Arlene Helen Donovan
- Occupation: Film producer
- Years active: 1982–1998
- Known for: Places in the Heart

Arlene Donovan (July 15, 1927 – February 14, 2024) was an American film producer and literary editor. She often worked with director Robert Benton and she was nominated for an Academy Award for her producing work on Places in the Heart.

== Career ==
Donovan began her career in the literary field as an editor, notably at Dell Publishing, where she helped the creators of the Berenstain Bears find a literary agent.

Donovan's first film work was as an assistant to Robert Rossen on his uncompleted film Cocoa Beach.

She was then the head of the motion picture literary department at ICM in New York from 1968 until 1980 when she took a leave of absence to work on the film Still of the Night, then called Stab. This began Donovan's producing career and her long collaboration with director Robert Benton, who she worked with for much of her career.

For her second film, Places in the Heart, she was nominated for an Academy Award. The film was nominated for Best Picture and she was nominated as its producer.

After this she continued to work as a producer with Benton on films like Nadine (1987), Billy Bathgate (1991), Nobody's Fool (1994), and Twilight (1998). She is only credited on one other director's film The House on Carroll Street directed by Peter Yates, which she co-executive produced with Benton.

Donovan eventually moved to work for Colombia Pictures where she continued to work on films, including Benton's Kramer vs. Kramer for which Benton won an Oscar for Best Director. In his acceptance speech at the Oscars he thanked Donovan.

== Nominations ==
She was nominated for an Academy Award for producing Places in the Heart, which was nominated for Best Picture.

== Filmography ==
- Still of the Night (1982)
- Places in the Heart (1984)
- Nadine (1987)
- The House on Carroll Street (1988)
- Billy Bathgate (1991)
- Nobody's Fool (1994)
- Twilight (1998)
