= 1994 National Society of Film Critics Awards =

Annual US film awards ceremony

29th NSFC Awards

January 3, 1995

Best Film:
Pulp Fiction

The 29th National Society of Film Critics Awards, given on 3 January 1995, honored the best filmmaking of 1994.

== Winners ==
=== Best Picture ===
1. Pulp Fiction
2. Red (Trois couleurs: Rouge)
3. Hoop Dreams

=== Best Director ===
1. Quentin Tarantino – Pulp Fiction
2. Krzysztof Kieślowski – Red (Trois couleurs: Rouge)
3. Louis Malle – Vanya on 42nd Street

=== Best Actor ===
1. Paul Newman – Nobody's Fool
2. Samuel L. Jackson – Pulp Fiction
3. John Travolta – Pulp Fiction

=== Best Actress ===
1. Jennifer Jason Leigh – Mrs. Parker and the Vicious Circle
2. Jessica Lange – Blue Sky
3. Linda Fiorentino – The Last Seduction

=== Best Supporting Actor ===
1. Martin Landau – Ed Wood
2. Samuel L. Jackson – Pulp Fiction
3. Paul Scofield – Quiz Show

=== Best Supporting Actress ===
1. Dianne Wiest – Bullets Over Broadway
2. Uma Thurman – Pulp Fiction
3. Brooke Smith – Vanya on 42nd Street

=== Best Screenplay ===
1. Quentin Tarantino and Roger Avary – Pulp Fiction
2. Paul Attanasio – Quiz Show
3. Krzysztof Kieślowski and Krzysztof Piesiewicz – Red (Trois couleurs: Rouge)

=== Best Cinematography ===
- Stefan Czapsky – Ed Wood

=== Best Foreign Language Film ===
1. Red (Trois couleurs: Rouge)
2. To Live (Huozhe)
3. Caro Diario

=== Best Documentary ===
- Hoop Dreams

=== Experimental Film ===
- Sátántangó
- The Pharaoh's Belt
