= Ed Harris =

American actor and director (born 1950)

- Harris in 2026
- Born: Edward Allen Harris; November 28, 1950 (age 75); Englewood, New Jersey, U.S.
- Education: Columbia University; University of Oklahoma; California Institute of the Arts (BFA)
- Occupations: Actor; filmmaker
- Years active: 1975–present
- Works: Full list
- Spouse: Amy Madigan (m. 1983)
- Children: 1
- Awards: Full list

Edward Allen Harris (born November 28, 1950) is an American actor and filmmaker. Harris received nominations for the Academy Award for Best Supporting Actor for his performances in Apollo 13 (1995), The Truman Show (1998), and The Hours (2002). He also directed and starred in Pollock (2000), for which he was nominated for the Academy Award for Best Actor, and Appaloosa (2008).

Harris has appeared in numerous leading and supporting roles, including Knightriders (1981), Creepshow (1982), The Right Stuff (1983), Places in the Heart (1984), The Abyss (1989), Glengarry Glen Ross (1992), The Firm (1993), Nixon (1995), The Rock (1996), Stepmom (1998), A Beautiful Mind, Enemy at the Gates (both 2001), A History of Violence (2005), Gone Baby Gone, National Treasure: Book of Secrets (both 2007), The Way Back (2010), Snowpiercer (2013), Mother! (2017), The Lost Daughter (2021), and Top Gun: Maverick (2022).

On television, Harris is notable for his roles as Warren on the CBS drama series Lou Grant (1979–81) and Miles Roby on the HBO drama miniseries Empire Falls (2005). He also starred as William / The Man in Black on the HBO dystopian sci-fi western series Westworld (2016–22).

== Early life and education ==
Harris was born at Englewood Hospital in Englewood, New Jersey, and grew up in the suburb of Tenafly, New Jersey, the son of Margaret (née Sholl), a travel agent, and Robert L. Harris (1922–2014), who sang with the Fred Waring chorus and worked at the bookstore of the Art Institute of Chicago. Ed has an older brother, Robert and a younger brother, Paul. Ed grew up in a middle-class Presbyterian family. His parents were from Oklahoma. He graduated from Tenafly High School in 1969, where he had played on the football team and served as the team's captain in his senior year.

A star athlete in high school, Ed Harris played varsity football at Columbia University and was a teammate of future United States Attorney General Eric Holder. At Columbia, he was a resident in Carman Hall. When his family moved to New Mexico two years later, Harris followed, having discovered his interest in acting in various theater plays. He enrolled at the University of Oklahoma to study drama. After several successful roles in local theaters (such as the Jewel Box Theater in Oklahoma City), he moved to Los Angeles and enrolled at the California Institute of the Arts, where he spent two years and graduated with a Bachelor of Fine Arts in 1975.

== Career ==
=== 1976–1983: Rise to prominence ===
Harris began his career on the stage. In 1976, he played an FBI agent in the world premiere of Thomas Rickman's play Baalam at the Pasadena Repertory Theatre located at the historic The Hotel Carver. He followed that at the Pasadena Repertory Theatre in 1976 playing Lot in the West Coast premiere of Tennessee Williams' play Kingdom of Earth (aka The Seven Descents of Myrtle). Harris' first film role came in 1978 with a minor part in the suspense film Coma, starring Geneviève Bujold and Michael Douglas. His first major role in a film came two years later with Borderline (1980), in which he starred alongside Charles Bronson. In 1981, Harris played the lead as motorcycler William "Billy" Davis, (a role modeled after King Arthur), in Knightriders, directed by George A. Romero. The following year, he had a small role as Hank Blaine in Creepshow, also directed by Romero.

From the mid-1970s to the mid-1980s, Harris found steady work on television. He had a role in one episode of Gibbsville (1975), in one episode of Delvecchio (1977), in one episode of The Rockford Files (1978), in one episode of David Cassidy: Man Undercover (1978), two episodes of The Seekers (1979), one episode of Barnaby Jones (1979), one episode of Paris (1980), three episodes of Lou Grant (1979, 1980, and 1981), one episode of CHiPs (1981), one episode of Hart to Hart (1981), one episode of Cassie & Co. (1981), and one episode of American Playhouse (1984).

=== 1983–1999: Breakthrough and leading roles ===
In 1983, Harris became well known after portraying astronaut John Glenn in The Right Stuff. In 1984, he co starred in the Robert Benton-directed drama film Places in the Heart; during production of this film, Harris met and married his wife Amy Madigan.

Also in 1984 he co-starred along with Goldie Hawn and Kurt Russell in the Jonathan Demme-directed World War II drama Swing Shift and in 1985 played abusive husband Charlie Dick to Jessica Lange's Patsy Cline in the HBO film Sweet Dreams. In 1986, he received a Tony Award nomination in the Best Actor in a Play category for his role in George Furth's Precious Sons. He also won the Theatre World Award and Drama Desk Award for Outstanding Actor in a Play for his performance. Harris then portrayed William Walker, a 19th-century American who appointed himself President of Nicaragua, in Walker (1987). That same year, he played Harry Nash in the HBO television thriller film The Last Innocent Man.

In 1988, he acted in Agnieszka Holland's To Kill a Priest, starring Christopher Lambert, based on Jerzy Popiełuszko and his murder under the Polish communist regime. It was well received by critics. In 1989, his role as David "Dave" Flannigan in Jacknife earned him his first Golden Globe Award nomination, for Best Supporting Actor – Motion Picture. Also in 1989, he portrayed Virgil "Bud" Brigman in the sci fi film The Abyss, directed by James Cameron.

In 1992, Harris co starred as Dave Moss in the drama film Glengarry Glen Ross, based on the play of the same name by David Mamet. He won the Valladolid International Film Festival Award for Best Actor for his performance in the film. He next appeared in the films The Firm (1993) and Needful Things (1993), before portraying the lead role of Kyle Bodine in the neo noir film China Moon (1994). In 1995, Harris appeared in the legal thriller Just Cause and portrayed Watergate figure E. Howard Hunt in the Oliver Stone biopic Nixon. He received his first Academy Award nomination for Best Supporting Actor for his performance as NASA Apollo Mission Control Director Gene Kranz in Apollo 13 (1995).

In 1996, Harris starred in and was executive producer for the television adaptation of Riders of the Purple Sage. That same year, he appeared in John Schlesinger's psychological thriller Eye for an Eye, Michael Bay's action film The Rock, and returned to Broadway as Major Steve Arnold in the Ronald Harwood play Taking Sides. He then starred in Clint Eastwood's political thriller Absolute Power (1997), co starred with Jim Carrey in the comedy drama The Truman Show (1998), which earned him a second nomination for the Academy Award for Best Supporting Actor and won him a Golden Globe Award for Best Supporting Actor – Motion Picture, and appeared alongside Julia Roberts and Susan Sarandon in the family drama Stepmom (1998).

=== 2000–2009: Directorial debut and other work ===
Harris made his directorial debut in 2000 with the drama biopic Pollock, in which he also starred as artist Jackson Pollock. He was nominated for his first Academy Award for Best Actor (his third Oscar nomination overall) for his performance. To prepare for the role, he built a small studio in which to copy the painter's techniques. Two years later, Harris was nominated for his fourth Academy Award (third in the Best Supporting Actor category) for his role as Richard Brown in the British American drama film The Hours.

In between the two Oscar nominated roles, he appeared in the biographical drama A Beautiful Mind (2001) and portrayed German sniper Major Erwin König in the war thriller Enemy at the Gates (2001). In 2002, he appeared in adverts for the Vauxhall Vectra in the United Kingdom. In 2003, he played Coach Harold Jones in the football drama Radio.

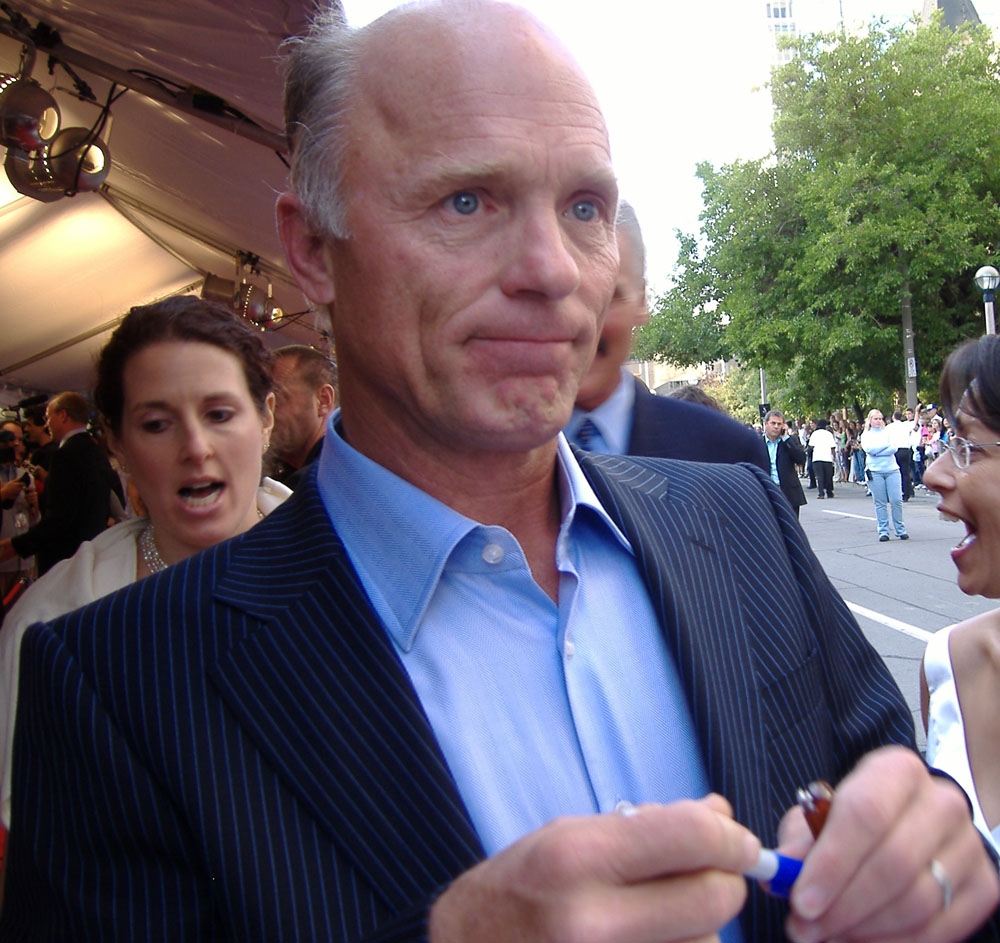
Harris at the 2005 Toronto International Film Festival

For his lead role as Miles Roby in the 2005 miniseries Empire Falls, Harris was nominated for a Primetime Emmy Award for Outstanding Lead Actor in a Limited or Anthology Series or Movie and a Golden Globe Award for Best Actor – Miniseries or Television Film. Also that year, he played a vengeful mobster in David Cronenberg's A History of Violence (2005) starring Viggo Mortensen. In 2006, he portrayed composer Ludwig van Beethoven in the film Copying Beethoven, and starred in the television documentary film The Armenian Genocide as American diplomat Leslie Davis. He next appeared alongside Casey Affleck and Morgan Freeman in the Ben Affleck directed neo noir mystery film Gone Baby Gone (2007). Harris then co-starred as antagonist Mitch Wilkinson in National Treasure: Book of Secrets (2007), alongside Nicolas Cage. In 2008, he co wrote, directed and starred along with Viggo Mortensen in the western, Appaloosa.

=== 2010–present: Career expansion ===
In 2010, he and wife Amy Madigan appeared together in Ash Adams' independent crime drama Once Fallen. Later that same year Harris starred in the survival drama The Way Back as Mr. Smith. His performance received much critical praise, and he was suggested by critics to receive a fifth Oscar nomination. Also in 2010, he portrayed the role of Jason Hudson in Call of Duty: Black Ops. In 2012, he co-starred alongside Sam Worthington in the thriller film Man on a Ledge for Summit Entertainment. He then won the Golden Globe Award for Best Supporting Actor – Series, Miniseries or Television Film and was nominated for the Primetime Emmy Award for Outstanding Supporting Actor in a Limited or Anthology Series or Movie for his performance as Senator John McCain in the HBO made for television drama Game Change.

In 2013, Harris reunited with director Michael Bay in the true crime film Pain & Gain, appeared in the post-apocalyptic thriller Snowpiercer, the western thriller Sweetwater, and starred opposite Annette Bening in the romantic drama film The Face of Love. Harris then voiced Mission Control in Alfonso Cuarón's space epic Gravity (2013), starring Sandra Bullock and George Clooney. He also voiced Blade Ranger in the animated film Planes: Fire & Rescue (2014). In 2015, he portrayed the title character in the film version of the Shakespeare tragedy Cymbeline, and starred with Liam Neeson in the action thriller Run All Night. In 2016, he appeared alongside Madigan and Taissa Farmiga in The New Group's revival of Sam Shepard's Buried Child, for which he was nominated for the Lucille Lortel Award for Outstanding Lead Actor in a Play.

In 2016, he also began playing the villainous Man in Black in HBO's sci-fi thriller series Westworld, and had a co-starring role in the ensemble cast of Warren Beatty's romantic comedy drama Rules Don't Apply, with Lily Collins and Alden Ehrenreich. In 2017, he appeared in Dean Devlin's sci-fi film Geostorm, alongside Gerard Butler and Andy Garcia. Harris had been previously set to star in Alejandro González Iñárritu's Starz drama series The One Percent with Hilary Swank and Ed Helms. Harris co-starred in Darren Aronofsky's horror film Mother! (2017), alongside Jennifer Lawrence, Javier Bardem, Michelle Pfeiffer, and Domhnall Gleeson. Harris also starred in the 2017 movie Kodachrome. His performance was widely regarded as one of the film's highlights.

In 2019, Harris took over the role of Atticus Finch in Aaron Sorkin's stage adaptation of To Kill a Mockingbird on Broadway. The role was previously played by original cast member Jeff Daniels. In 2021, he starred in Maggie Gyllenhaal's psychological drama The Lost Daughter. In 2022, Harris played Rear Admiral Chester "Hammer" Cain in the blockbuster film Top Gun: Maverick. Harris was in the film Love Lies Bleeding as Lou Sr. in 2024. On May 13, 2024, Harris was set to direct and write the feature film adaptation of Kim Zupan's neo-noir crime thriller novel The Ploughman, starring Owen Teague, Nick Nolte, Bill Murray, Madigan and their daughter Lily Harris.

== Personal life ==
=== Marriage ===
Harris married actress Amy Madigan on November 21, 1983, while they were filming Places in the Heart together. They have one daughter, Lily, born in 1993. Harris and Madigan lost their Malibu home in the Palisades Fire of January 2025.

=== Beliefs and style ===
On March 21, 1999, during the 71st Academy Awards, Harris and Madigan were among those in the audience who stayed in their seats and did not applaud Elia Kazan, who had received an Academy Honorary Award. According to an article in The Los Angeles Times, Kazan had become "something of a nonperson in politically liberal Hollywood" due to his testimony before the House Un-American Activities Committee in 1952, naming eight friends from the Group Theatre as communists and never apologizing. The article does not specifically quote Harris or Madigan on the then-controversial question of Kazan's honorary award.

On March 20, 2012, the Screen Actors Guild (SAG) and the American Federation of Television and Radio Artists (AFTRA) merged to form a new union, SAG-AFTRA. Harris, along with some other actors, opposed the merger and sued SAG President Ken Howard and several SAG Vice Presidents, seeking to have the merger undone. They were unsuccessful. The lawsuit was dismissed on May 22, 2012.

On March 13, 2015, Harris was honored with a star on the Hollywood Walk of Fame, located at 6712 Hollywood Boulevard, for his work in motion pictures. Harris received an honorary degree from Muhlenberg College on May 17, 2015.

New York magazine described Harris as being referred to as a "thinking woman's sex symbol".

== Acting credits and accolades ==
Harris has received numerous accolades including two Actor Awards and two Golden Globes. He has also received nominations for four Academy Awards, two British Academy Film Awards, three Primetime Emmy Awards, a Tony Award, and a Laurence Olivier Award.

Harris has been recognized by the Academy of Motion Picture Arts and Sciences for the following performances:

- 68th Academy Awards: Best Actor in a Supporting Role, nomination, for Apollo 13 (1995)
- 71st Academy Awards: Best Actor in a Supporting Role, nomination, for The Truman Show (1998)
- 73rd Academy Awards: Best Actor in a Leading Role, nomination, for Pollock (2000)
- 75th Academy Awards: Best Actor in a Supporting Role, nomination, for The Hours (2002)
