= Empire Falls (miniseries) =

- DVD cover
- Genre: Drama
- Based on: Empire Falls by Richard Russo
- Written by: Richard Russo
- Directed by: Fred Schepisi
- Starring: Ed Harris; Philip Seymour Hoffman; Helen Hunt; Paul Newman; Robin Wright Penn; Aidan Quinn; Joanne Woodward
- Narrated by: Larry Pine
- Music by: Paul Grabowsky
- Country of origin: United States
- Original language: English

Production
- Executive producers: Paul Newman; Scott Steindorff; Fred Schepisi; Marc Platt
- Producer: William Teitler
- Cinematography: Ian Baker
- Editor: Kate Williams
- Running time: 195 minutes (8 chapters)
- Production companies: Aspetuck Productions; Stone Village Pictures; HBO Films

Original release
- Network: HBO
- Release: May 28 – May 29, 2005

Empire Falls is a 2005 American television miniseries directed by Fred Schepisi and written by Richard Russo, based on Russo's 2001 novel of the same name. It aired on HBO in two parts, from May 28 to May 29, 2005. The miniseries was nominated for and won multiple awards, including ten Primetime Emmy Awards (winning one) and four Golden Globe Awards (winning two).

== Plot ==
Empire Falls, Maine is a small, decaying and nearly bankrupt town. Miles Roby, the passive and unassuming manager of the Empire Grill, has lived there all his life. Divorced from Janine, who left him for Walt, the owner of the local fitness center, Miles lives in a small apartment above the Grill. Janine, a selfish and cocky exercise addict who has recently lost fifty pounds, lives in Miles' old house with their teenager daughter, Christina ("Tick"), and Walt, who visit the Empire Grill every day to show there are no hard feelings about him breaking up Miles' marriage.

Miles' younger brother, David, is a talented cook at the Empire Grill. Their partnership has made the restaurant successful but not profitable due to restrictions by its owner, Francine Whiting, the town's wealthiest citizen. Whiting, who is outwardly friendly but also condescending and manipulative, seems to enjoy exerting control over Miles. She is the widow of C.B. Whiting, who owned the defunct shirt factory that employed many of the town's citizens, including Miles' late mother, Grace. Always complicating matters is Miles' grubby ne'er-do-well father, Max, a rascal who can't resist a handout when it comes his way, but loves his sons and his granddaughter.

Miles is plagued by flashbacks of his childhood. He recalls a trip to Martha's Vineyard with his mother and their time with a mysterious man named Charlie Mayne. After discovering his father is in jail for being a public nuisance, Miles suspects an affair between his mother and Charlie. When they return to Empire Falls, it's revealed that Grace is pregnant. After being laid off from the shirt factory, she goes to work for Mrs. Whiting, explaining to Miles that she's done someone "a great wrong" and needs to make amends.

As an adult, Miles reflects on these memories and realizes that Charlie Mayne was in fact C.B. Whiting, who after an argument with his wife accidentally ran over their young daughter with his car. The guilt from crippling her led him to exile himself in Mexico, returning years later determined to kill Francine, only to lose his determination at the sight of his daughter and shoot himself instead.

David pushes Miles to stand up to Mrs. Whiting so they can run a more profitable business, which eventually leads to Miles choosing to go into business with his former mother-in-law, Bea, the owner of a local bar. Whiting attempts to sabotage their plans by pulling strings with the county and the police force, culminating in a confrontation with Miles, wherein he quits the Empire Grill and reveals what he knows about his mother's affair with C.B.

Miles is close with his daughter, Tick, who is fending off angry outbursts from her cruel ex-boyfriend, Zack Minty, and an emotional conflict over her mother's engagement to Walt, whom Tick despises. She befriends John Voss, an emotionally disturbed boy at school whose parents abandoned him with his grandmother after years of abuse. The obnoxious jock Zack and his friends constantly bully John. It's eventually revealed as a result of their meddling and cruelty that John's grandmother died months ago and he has been living in her decrepit home ever since.

John comes to the high school with a gun and shoots several of his classmates. He attempts to shoot Tick, but she is saved by the school's principal. Tick is deeply traumatized by the shooting. Miles takes her on an extended trip to Martha's Vineyard, where she begins to recover after several weeks. He calls Janine and discovers that she and Walt split up. A powerful storm caused the nearby river to swell, which led to Mrs. Whiting being killed, removing any remaining impediments to Miles and Bea's new restaurant.

Max arrives in Martha's Vineyard to ask for money and bring Miles and Tick home. Miles suggests that David might not be Max's son, something Max rejects, insisting that, "a man knows his own child," and that David is his son. Max happily reunites with Tick, who says she is ready to return home.

== Characters ==
- Ed Harris as Miles Roby – The middle-aged central character of the story. Miles is the seemingly content manager of the Empire Grill in Empire Falls, Maine and is divorced with one teenaged daughter. A blue-collar gentleman with his principles intact, he lives in an apartment over the restaurant he has managed ever since he dropped out of college to look after his dying mother. However, this has left him constantly accountable to Francine Whiting, causing others to persuade him to open a business of his own.
- Helen Hunt as Janine Roby – Miles' ex-wife. She has developed a selfish attitude, damaging her relationship with her daughter and annoying her mother. She gained ownership of the house and custody of their daughter while Miles ended up in an apartment above the Empire Grill. Janine resents the close relationship that exists between father and daughter. As the story progresses, Janine finds that tables are turning on her for the worst.
- Danielle Panabaker as Christina "Tick" Roby – Miles' daughter. She enjoys a loving relationship with both her father and grandfather. Tick is smart, friendly, and more sympathetic than most of her classmates. Her mother's engagement has a negative impact on her. She resents her mother and she despises Walt, who is trying to act like a father figure.
- Paul Newman as Max Roby – Miles' father. Disheveled and constantly defiant of those around him, Max has no problem saying what he thinks of people, even directly to their faces. He is happy to accept any "handout" (or to take anything he wants) even when it means stealing money from the church. Max has a lifelong affinity for Key West, Florida. Despite being a vagabond, Max loves his sons and granddaughter. (This was Newman's final onscreen role. He is played by Josh Lucas in flashback)
- Philip Seymour Hoffman as Charlie Mayne – A mysterious suitor to Miles' mother and a symbolic figure in Miles' life. Charlie's involvement is pivotal with regard to why Miles has lived in Empire Falls his entire life.
- Robin Wright Penn as Grace Roby – Miles' mother (deceased in present). She considers her son the jewel of her eye. Her affair with Charlie plays a crucial role in Miles' life.
- Joanne Woodward as Francine Whiting – The town's wealthiest citizen. The manipulative Francine holds puppet strings over the town, in particular Miles, and has no problem pulling them when it suits her unscrupulous agenda. Her condescending manner veils a cunning woman with ulterior motives.
- Aidan Quinn as David Roby – Miles' younger brother. A former alcoholic, a reformed marijuana plant grower and a car-crash survivor, David is the chief cook at the Empire Grill. His talent brings a considerable amount of business to the diner. He encourages Miles to take risks, having promised their mother to watch after him. It is also implied that David is actually Miles's half-brother, through flashbacks of their mother and Charlie Mayne.
- Dennis Farina as Walt Comeau – Janine's fiance and the owner of a fitness club. Walt is extroverted and arrogant. He lives with Janine in Miles' old house, trying to develop a fatherly relationship with Tick. Walt makes daily appearances at the restaurant to challenge Miles to an arm-wrestling match. He has a couple of skeletons in his closet, hidden (temporarily) from Janine.
- Lou Taylor Pucci as John Voss – Tick's awkward, introverted classmate. He is from a deprived family, wears ragged, dirty clothing and is known to live with his grandmother after his parents abandoned him. He's constantly ridiculed by Tick's ex-boyfriend, Zack Minty. His history has created a dangerous aura about him, one that eventually escalates. No one but Tick pays enough attention to him until it's too late.
- Kate Burton as Cindy Whiting – Francine's daughter. Despite being permanently disabled by a car accident, she is a sweet woman with high spirits. She has a long-standing attraction to Miles; he is aware of it and sympathetic, but does not feel the same way.
- William Fichtner as Jimmy Minty – A dull-witted, unscrupulous police officer and former classmate of Miles. He is not well liked by most of the town, although he believes he is. Francine keeps him in her pocket by providing perks such as a red sports car. He has an eye on becoming chief of police one day, and unfortunately, has keys to most of the town's businesses which he uses to his advantage. He and Miles ultimately come to blows.
- Trevor Morgan as Zack Minty – Son of Jimmy Minty, Tick's ex-boyfriend and a high school bully. A football star who is an obnoxious and cruel punk, Zack gets away with his bad behavior because of his popularity and his father's status as a police officer. He loves tormenting John to the point of breaking into his house, and is indirectly responsible for making John reach his breaking point.
- Estelle Parsons as Bea – Janine's wise mother. Ex-mother-in-law to Miles, they remain good friends. Bea frequently takes Miles' side rather than Janine's, and often makes rather pointed remarks about Janine's behavior. She owns a local bar and wants Miles to go into business with her.
- Theresa Russell as Charlene – Waitress at the Empire Grill. She is aware that Miles is attracted to her, and she's kind to him, but she is dating David.
- Bill Daws (Stephen Mendillo) – The compassionate chief of police and a friend to Miles. He is dying of cancer and is undergoing chemotherapy which takes a heavy toll on his health, confiding only in Miles with the news.
- Jeffrey DeMunn as Horace – A local reporter and a regular patron at the grill. He is an intellectual with a heavy Maine accent and has intimate knowledge of what goes on around town. He has a prominent cyst on his forehead and Max often tactlessly refers to it.
- Adam LeFevre as Father Mark – A friendly priest. He works at a decrepit church, which he has hired Miles to paint.
- Nesbitt Blaisdell as Father Tom – An elderly priest. He is becoming senile and behaves erratically, even helping Max steal money from the church.
- Larry Pine as Otto Meyer – Principal of the high school. A childhood friend of Miles, he is an honorable man who watches out for students like John and Tick. He plays a pivotal role when John "snaps." (Pine also serves as narrator.)
- Delia Robertson as Candace – Tick's classmate and best friend. She finds some amusement when Zack picks on John, but is inevitably involved when John reaches his breaking point.
- Tony Takacs as Justin – Zack's best friend. Overweight, with a penchant for junk food, he participates with Zack in taunting John, although he draws limits when Zack breaks into John's house. He, too, is affected by John's revenge.

== Awards and nominations ==
Year	Award	Category	Nominee(s)	Result	Ref.
2005	Artios Awards	Outstanding Achievement in Mini-Series Casting	Avy Kaufman	Won	
2005	Online Film & Television Association Awards	Best Motion Picture Made for Television		Nominated	
2005	Online Film & Television Association Awards	Best Actor in a Motion Picture or Miniseries	Ed Harris	Nominated	
2005	Online Film & Television Association Awards	Best Supporting Actor in a Motion Picture or Miniseries	Paul Newman	Won	
2005	Online Film & Television Association Awards	Best Supporting Actress in a Motion Picture or Miniseries	Joanne Woodward	Nominated	
2005	Online Film & Television Association Awards	Best Direction of a Motion Picture or Miniseries	Fred Schepisi	Nominated	
2005	Online Film & Television Association Awards	Best Writing of a Motion Picture or Miniseries	Richard Russo	Nominated	
2005	Online Film & Television Association Awards	Best Ensemble in a Motion Picture or Miniseries		Nominated	
2005	Online Film & Television Association Awards	Best Editing in a Motion Picture or Miniseries		Nominated	
2005	Primetime Emmy Awards	Outstanding Miniseries	Paul Newman, Scott Steindorff, Fred Schepisi, Marc Platt, and William Teitler	Nominated	
2005	Primetime Emmy Awards	Outstanding Lead Actor in a Miniseries or a Movie	Ed Harris	Nominated	
2005	Primetime Emmy Awards	Outstanding Supporting Actor in a Miniseries or a Movie	Philip Seymour Hoffman	Nominated	
2005	Primetime Emmy Awards	Outstanding Supporting Actor in a Miniseries or a Movie	Paul Newman	Won	
2005	Primetime Emmy Awards	Outstanding Supporting Actress in a Miniseries or a Movie	Joanne Woodward	Nominated	
2005	Primetime Emmy Awards	Outstanding Directing for a Miniseries, Movie or a Dramatic Special	Fred Schepisi	Nominated	
2005	Primetime Emmy Awards	Outstanding Writing for a Miniseries, Movie or a Dramatic Special	Richard Russo	Nominated	
2005	Primetime Emmy Awards	Outstanding Art Direction for a Miniseries or Movie	Stuart Wurtzel, John Kasarda, and Maria Nay	Nominated	
2005	Primetime Emmy Awards	Outstanding Casting for a Miniseries, Movie or Special	Avy Kaufman	Nominated	
2005	Primetime Emmy Awards	Outstanding Single-Camera Picture Editing for a Miniseries or a Movie	Kate Williams	Nominated	
2005	Satellite Awards	Best Miniseries		Nominated	
2005	Satellite Awards	Best Actor in a Miniseries or Motion Picture Made for Television	Ed Harris	Nominated	
2005	Satellite Awards	Best Actor in a Supporting Role in a Series, Miniseries or Motion Picture Made for Television	Paul Newman	Nominated	
2005	Women's Image Network Awards	Actor in Made-for-TV Movie/Miniseries	Ed Harris	Won	
2005	Women's Image Network Awards	Actor in Made-for-TV Movie/Miniseries	Philip Seymour Hoffman	Nominated	
2005	Women's Image Network Awards	Actress in Made-for-TV Movie/Miniseries	Danielle Panabaker	Nominated	
2006	AARP Movies for Grownups Awards	Best TV Movie		Nominated	
2006	Art Directors Guild Awards	Excellence in Production Design Award – Television Movie or Mini-series	Stuart Wurtzel, John Kasarda, David Stein, and Tom Warren	Won	
2006	Costume Designers Guild Awards	Outstanding Made for Television Movie or Miniseries	Donna Zakowska	Nominated	
2006	Directors Guild of America Awards	Outstanding Directorial Achievement in Movies for Television or Miniseries	Fred Schepisi	Nominated	
2006	Golden Globe Awards	Best Miniseries or Television Film		Won	
2006	Golden Globe Awards	Best Actor in a Miniseries or Television Film	Ed Harris	Nominated	
2006	Golden Globe Awards	Best Supporting Actor – Series, Miniseries or Television Film	Paul Newman	Won	
2006	Golden Globe Awards	Best Supporting Actress – Series, Miniseries or Television Film	Joanne Woodward	Nominated	
2006	Gracie Awards	Outstanding Supporting Actress – Drama Special	Helen Hunt	Won	
2006	Producers Guild of America Awards	David L. Wolper Award for Outstanding Producer of Long-Form Television	Paul Newman, Marc Platt, Scott Steindorff, Fred Schepisi, and William Teitler	Nominated	
2006	Screen Actors Guild Awards	Outstanding Performance by a Male Actor in a Miniseries or Television Movie	Ed Harris	Nominated	
2006	Screen Actors Guild Awards	Outstanding Performance by a Male Actor in a Miniseries or Television Movie	Paul Newman	Won	
2006	Screen Actors Guild Awards	Outstanding Performance by a Female Actor in a Miniseries or Television Movie	Joanne Woodward	Nominated	
2006	Screen Actors Guild Awards	Outstanding Performance by a Female Actor in a Miniseries or Television Movie	Robin Wright Penn	Nominated	
