= Everybody's Fool (novel) =

2016 novel by Richard Russo

- Author: Richard Russo
- Language: English
- Genre: Novel
- Publisher: Alfred A. Knopf
- Publication date: May 3, 2016
- Publication place: United States
- Media type: Print (Hardcover)
- Pages: 477
- ISBN: 9780307270641
- OCLC: 922630506

Everybody's Fool is a 2016 novel by Richard Russo. It is the second book in Russo's North Bath Trilogy, following Nobody's Fool (1993) and preceding Somebody's Fool (2023).

== Synopsis ==
The narrative follows the lives of a number of characters in fictional North Bath, NY, over the course of a Memorial Day weekend. Police chief Douglas Raymer, the "fool" of the title, tries to discover the identity of his late wife's lover. His only clue is a garage door opener, which he uses on various houses to see whose door will open. Donald "Sully" Sullivan has recently come into money but must now come to grips with his declining health. Both men get involved in a drama regarding the return of Roy Purdy, a wife abuser whose existence threatens Sully's ex-lover, Ruth. Additionally, Raymer works cases involving a crumbling building, a dissolving cemetery, and the illegal smuggling of dangerous snakes. All the while, Raymer navigates his possibly romantic feelings for Charice, one of his officers.

== Critical reception ==
In a review for The New York Times, Janet Maslin called the novel "delightful". Reviewing it for The Wall Street Journal, Jennifer Maloney said it was "a madcap romp, weaving mystery, suspense and comedy in a race to the final pages.". In the Star Tribune, Kevin Canfield called it "a decidedly bittersweet affair, a sequel that proves both entertaining and elegiac".

Reviewing it for the Portland Press Herald, Michael Berry concluded that the novel "displays his trademark style, that easy, sardonic and yet not unkind authorial voice that reveals the characters’ inner lives, full of well-worn habit and surprising contradiction, with honesty, humor and compassion.". Meanwhile, Ron Charles of The Washington Post suggested the biracial relationship between Raymer and his assistant Charice was "forced".

== Awards ==
- 2017 Grand Prix de Littérature Américaine
