= Empire Falls =

2001 novel by Richard Russo

- Cover of first edition
- Author: Richard Russo
- Language: English
- Genre: Novel
- Publisher: Knopf
- Publication date: May 8, 2001
- Publication place: United States
- Media type: Print (hardback & paperback)
- Pages: 496 pp
- ISBN: 0-679-43247-7
- OCLC: 46863970
- Dewey Decimal: 813/.54 21
- LC Class: PS3568.U812 E4 2001b

Empire Falls is a 2001 novel written by Richard Russo. It won the Pulitzer Prize for Fiction in 2002, and follows the story of Miles Roby in a fictional, small blue-collar town in Maine and the people, places, and the past surrounding him, as manager of the Empire Grill diner. Critics roundly praised Russo's novel, especially his development of characters. The book was adapted into a miniseries for HBO in 2005.

== Plot ==
Set in the decaying, nearly bankrupt, small town of Empire Falls, Maine, this is the story of the unassuming manager of the Empire Grill, Miles Roby, who has spent his life in the town. The town, and Miles' life to a large degree, is controlled by the Whitings, a rich family that owns the local factories and much of the town's property.

Miles is separated and later divorced from Janine, who has become a cocky, selfish person after losing weight and exercising rigorously. This is partly due to encouragement from Walt Comeau, the antagonistic owner of a local fitness center who visits the Empire Grill daily and has moved into Roby's old house.

Roby is protective of his loving teenage daughter, nicknamed "Tick", who loves art. Tick is dealing with Zack Minty, her ex-boyfriend who continues to pursue her, and struggles with her mother's relationship with Walt whom Tick cannot stand. In addition, Tick has a complicated friendship with John Voss, an emotionally disturbed boy at school. The obnoxious jock Zack and his friends constantly bully John.

Other important people in Miles' life include his father, a rascal who can't resist a handout when it comes his way; Miles' reformed, marijuana smoking brother, who is a talented Empire Grill cook; Miles' good-hearted ex-mother-in-law, who owns a bar; the town's wealthiest woman, Francine Whiting, a condescending matron who owns the Empire Grill; Whiting's daughter, who has loved Miles for many years; an attractive waitress; a retiring police chief; and a dimwitted police officer, who is Zack's father and has known Miles since childhood.

Miles is plagued by flashbacks of his family when he was a child; these include memories of a mysterious affair between his mother and a suitor, the details of which might answer some questions Miles has had his entire life.

== Characters ==
Miles Roby—The middle-aged protagonist. Miles is the seemingly content manager of the Empire Grill in Empire Falls, Maine and is divorced with one teenaged daughter. A blue-collar gentleman with his principles intact, he lives in an apartment over the restaurant he has managed ever since he dropped out of college to look after his dying mother. However, this has left him constantly accountable to Francine Whiting, causing others to persuade him to open a business of his own.

Janine Roby—Miles' ex-wife. She has developed a selfish attitude, damaging her relationship with her daughter and annoying her mother. She gained ownership of the house and custody of their daughter, while Miles ended up in an apartment above the Empire Grill. Janine resents Miles' and their daughter Tick's close relationship. As the story progresses, Janine finds that tables are turning on her for the worse.

Christina "Tick" Roby—Miles and Janine's daughter. She enjoys a loving relationship with both her father and grandmother. Tick is smart, friendly, and more sympathetic than most of her classmates. Her mother's engagement has a negative impact on her; Tick despises Walt, who is trying to act like a father figure, and she resents her mother.

David Roby—Miles' younger brother. A former alcoholic, a reformed marijuana plant grower, and a car-crash survivor, David is the chief cook at the Empire Grill. His talent brings a considerable amount of business to the diner, providing ethnic dishes that attract a much larger crowd. He encourages Miles to take risks, having promised their mother to watch after Miles. It is also implied that David is actually Miles' half-brother, through flashbacks with their mother and Charlie Mayne.

Max Roby—Miles' father. Disheveled and constantly defiant of those around him, Max has no problem saying what he thinks of people, even directly to their faces. He is happy to accept any "handout" (or to take anything he wants), even when it means stealing money from the church. Max has a lifelong affinity for Key West, Florida. Despite being a vagabond, Max loves his sons and granddaughter, and is a great deal wiser than people assume he is.

Grace Roby—Miles' late mother. Miles is the jewel of her eye. Her affair with Charlie Mayne plays a crucial role in Miles' life.

Charlie Mayne—A mysterious suitor to Miles' mother and a symbolic figure in Miles' life. Charlie's involvement is a pivotal contributor to Miles' reasons for remaining in Empire Falls his entire life.

Charles "C.B." Beaumont Whiting —The sole male heir of the Whiting family, which ran Empire Falls from the factories up. Both his father and grandfather had had shrewd business sense, short stature, and thoughts of killing their wives - all qualities that C.B. has inherited. When he was young, he moved to Mexico, and dreamed of being an artist or poet. His father called him back to Empire Falls, where he took up the family business as well as an unhappy marriage to Francine Whiting. Generally unhappy, C.B. killed himself roughly 20 years before the time the book takes place.

Francine Whiting—The widow of the wealthiest man in central Maine. The manipulative Francine holds puppet strings over the town, in particular Miles, and has no problem pulling them when it suits her unscrupulous agenda. Her condescending manner veils a cunning woman with ulterior motives.

Cindy Whiting—Francine's daughter. Despite being permanently disabled by a car accident, she is a sweet woman with high spirits. She has a long-standing attraction to Miles; he is aware of it and is sympathetic, but does not feel the same way.

Walt Comeau—Janine's fiancé and the owner of a fitness club. Walt is extroverted and arrogant. He lives with Janine in Miles' old house, trying to develop a fatherly relationship with Tick. Walt makes daily appearances at the restaurant to challenge Miles to an arm-wrestling match. He has a couple of skeletons in his closet, hidden (temporarily) from Janine.

John Voss—Tick's awkward, introverted classmate. He is from a deprived family, wears ragged, dirty clothing, and is known to have lived with his grandmother after his parents abandoned him. He's constantly ridiculed by Tick's ex-boyfriend, Zack Minty. John's history has created a dangerous aura about him, which eventually escalates. No one but Tick pays enough attention to him until it is too late.

James "Jimmy" Minty—A dull-witted, unscrupulous police officer and former classmate of Miles'. Jimmy is not well liked by most of the town, although he believes he is. Francine keeps him in her pocket by providing perks, such as a red sports car. He has an eye on becoming Chief of Police one day and has the unfortunate hobby of making copies of every key he gets his hands on, boasting to his son that he can open any door in Dexter County - which ability he makes frequent use of. He works directly for Francine, doing odd jobs, on a fairly regular basis. When acting as her bodyguard, Jimmy and Miles ultimately come to blows.

Zack Minty—Jimmy's son and Tick's ex-boyfriend. A football star who is an obnoxious and cruel punk, Zack gets away with his bad behavior because of his popularity and his father's status as a police officer. He loves tormenting John to the point of breaking into his house, and is indirectly responsible for pushing John to his breaking point.

Beatrice "Bea" Majeski—Janine's wise mother and Miles' ex-mother-in-law. Bea and Miles remain good friends. Bea frequently takes Miles' side rather than Janine's, and often makes rather pointed remarks about Janine's behavior. Bea owns Callahan's, the local bar that she used to run with her late husband, serving both lunch and drinks. Since her husband's death, however, Callahan's no longer serves food. In order to remedy this, Bea is hoping Miles and David will go into business with her.

Charlene Gardiner—Waitress at the Empire Grill, and Miles' crush since high school. Charlene is both very attractive and very talkative, and prides herself on her ability to get customers to respond. She is aware that Miles is attracted to her, but she has neither mentioned it nor dissuaded him. She has married and divorced three times already, and is supposedly between boyfriends. Unbeknownst to Miles, however, she is dating his brother, David.

Bill Daws—The compassionate chief of police and a friend of Miles'. He is dying of cancer and is undergoing chemotherapy which takes a heavy toll on his health. He confides this news only to Miles and is distrustful of Jimmy Minty.

Horace Weymouth—A local reporter and a regular patron at the grill. He is an intellectual with a heavy Maine accent, and has intimate knowledge of what goes on around town. His forehead has a prominent cyst, which Max often tactlessly refers to.

Father Mark—A friendly priest and political activist, who after a brief run-in with the law, was moved to Empire Falls by his residing Cardinal. He works in St. Catharine's, a local Catholic church that Miles has attended since childhood. Miles has offered to paint the church for free, although his progress is slow because of how much time he spends chatting with Father Mark.

Father Tom—An elderly priest. He is developing dementia and behaves erratically. While he's known for being generally offensive and for his love of the word "peckerhead", Father Tom has forged a curious and inexplicable friendship with Max Roby that has everyone suspicious.

Otto Meyer, Jr.—Principal of the high school and a childhood friend of Miles', he is an honorable man who watches out for students like John and Tick. He plays a pivotal role when John "snaps".

Candace Burke—Tick's classmate and best friend. Very talkative, she regales Tick with stories of her apparently active love-life. When Zack begins flirting with her in an effort to make Tick jealous, Candace has no problem dumping her previous boyfriend for a chance with him. She finds some amusement when Zack picks on John, but is inevitably involved when John reaches his breaking point.

Justin Dibble—He's Zack's best friend, and has a crush on Candace. Overweight, with a penchant for junk food, he participates with Zack in taunting John, although he draws limits when Zack breaks into John's house. He, too, is affected by John's revenge.

== Critical reaction ==
In the New York Times, critic A. O. Scott praised the novel, writing "Russo's command of his story is unerring, but his manner is so unassuming that his mastery is easy to miss." Writing in the Christian Science Monitor, Ron Charles pointed to the author's ability to empathize with difficult characters. "What’s remarkable about Russo is his willingness to climb into the minds of the vain, the stupid, the stubborn, even the cruel, and discover in their vulnerable souls the germs of dormant humanity." Publishers Weekly called the book Russo's "biggest, boldest novel yet" and predicted brisk sales.

== Miniseries adaptation ==
The novel was adapted as an eponymous, two part mini-series that aired on HBO in 2005. The show was produced by Marc E. Platt and starred Ed Harris, Helen Hunt, Philip Seymour Hoffman, Dennis Farina, Joanne Woodward, and Paul Newman (in his last live action role). At Russo's suggestion, much of it was filmed in 10 towns in Maine, including Kennebunkport, Skowhegan, Winslow, and Waterville in Maine. During the filming of the Empire Falls miniseries, a pizza parlor in downtown Skowhegan, Maine, was transformed into a greasy spoon diner called Empire Grill. The establishment remained open under the Empire Grille name but closed six years later, due to a depressed local economy. The film won a Golden Globe for Best Mini-Series Made for Television in 2006. Paul Newman won a Golden Globe, a Primetime Emmy Award, a Screen Actors Guild Award and further recognitions as best Supporting Actor in a Mini-series.
