= National Board of Review Awards 1994 =

Annual US film awards ceremony

66th National Board of Review Awards

Best Picture (tie):
Forrest Gump &
Pulp Fiction

The 66th National Board of Review Awards, honoring the best in filmmaking in 1994, were announced on 14 December 1994 and given on 27 February 1995.

== Top 10 films ==
1. Forrest Gump / Pulp Fiction
2. Quiz Show
3. Four Weddings and a Funeral
4. Bullets over Broadway
5. Ed Wood
6. The Shawshank Redemption
7. Nobody's Fool
8. The Madness of King George
9. Tom & Viv
10. Heavenly Creatures

== Top Foreign Films ==
1. Eat Drink Man Woman
2. To Live
3. Strawberry and Chocolate
4. Three Colors: Red
5. Queen Margot

== Winners ==
- Best Picture (tie):
  - Forrest Gump
  - Pulp Fiction
- Best Foreign Film:
  - Eat Drink Man Woman
- Best Actor:
  - Tom Hanks - Forrest Gump
- Best Actress:
  - Miranda Richardson - Tom & Viv
- Best Supporting Actor:
  - Gary Sinise - Forrest Gump
- Best Supporting Actress:
  - Rosemary Harris - Tom & Viv
- Best Acting by an Ensemble:
  - Pret a Porter
- Best Director:
  - Quentin Tarantino - Pulp Fiction
- Best Screenplay:
  - William Goldman - Career Achievement
- Best Documentary:
  - Hoop Dreams
- Best Film made for Cable TV
  - Tales of the City
- Career Achievement Award:
  - Sidney Poitier
- Billy Wilder Award for Excellence in Directing:
  - Billy Wilder
- William K. Everson Award for Film History
  - William K. Everson
- Special Citation:
  - James Card, for outstanding film preservation
