= Richard Russo =

American writer & teacher (born 1949)

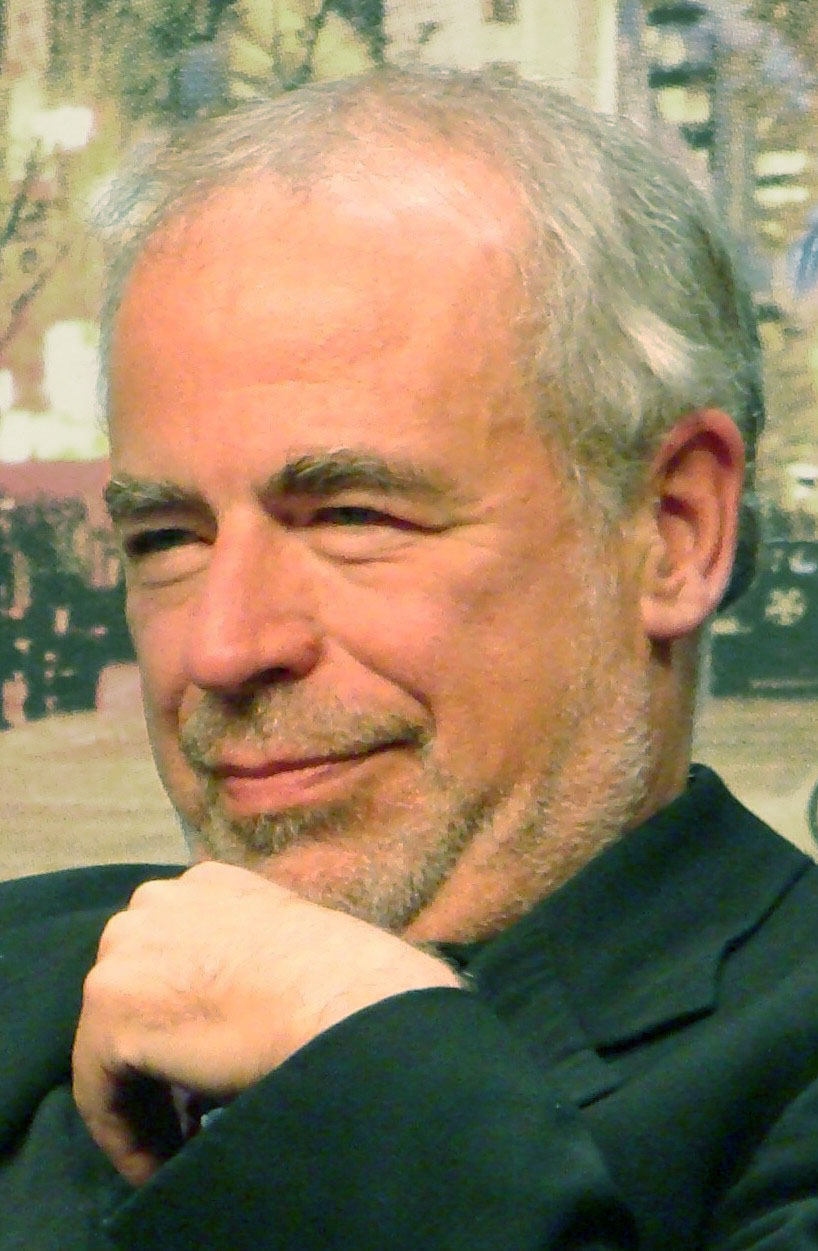
- Russo in 2008
- Born: July 15, 1949 (age 77); Johnstown, New York, U.S.
- Education: University of Arizona (BA, MFA, PhD)
- Occupations: Novelist; screenwriter; short-story writer
- Spouse: Barbara Russo
- Children: 2
- Writing career
- Notable works: Empire Falls, Nobody's Fool, Straight Man
- Notable awards: 2002 Pulitzer Prize for Fiction

Richard Russo (born July 15, 1949) is an American novelist, short story writer, screenwriter, and teacher. In 2002, he was awarded a Pulitzer Prize in Fiction for his novel Empire Falls. Several of his works have been adapted into television series and movies. He is known for his realistic depictions of rural, small-town life in the Northeastern United States, particularly in Maine, Pennsylvania, and Russo's native Upstate New York.

== Early life and education ==
Russo was born in Johnstown, New York, and raised in nearby Gloversville. His parents were divorced. His father, Jim Russo, was a highway worker. During Richard Russo's summer breaks from college, he and his father would work together on the road crew, then stop at pubs to tell stories about their work. Richard Russo has compared his father's process of altering his stories based on what got a laugh at the previous pub to the process of revising a novel.

He earned a bachelor's degree, a Master of Fine Arts degree, and a Doctor of Philosophy degree from the University of Arizona, which he attended from 1967 through 1979. The subject of his doctoral dissertation was the works of the early American writer, historian and editor Charles Brockden Brown.

While in graduate school, Russo admired Mark Twain and Charles Dickens' writing styles.

== Career ==
Russo was teaching in the English department at Southern Illinois University Carbondale when his first novel, Mohawk, was published, in 1986. Much of his work is semi-autobiographical, drawing on his life from his upbringing in upstate New York to his time teaching literature at Colby College, from which he retired in 1996 in order to pursue writing full-time.

His 2001 novel Empire Falls received the 2002 Pulitzer Prize for Fiction. He has written nine other novels, a collection of short stories, and a memoir (Elsewhere). His short story "Horseman" was published in The Best American Short Stories 2007 edited by Stephen King and Heidi Pitlor.

Besides his work as a book author, Russo along with director Robert Benton co-wrote the 1998 film Twilight, starring Paul Newman. He also wrote the screenplay for the 2005 film Ice Harvest and for the 2005 Niall Johnson film Keeping Mum, which starred Rowan Atkinson.

== Adaptations ==
Director Robert Benton adapted Russo's 1993 novel Nobody's Fool as a 1994 film of the same title, starring Paul Newman, which Benton directed. Russo also wrote the teleplay for the HBO adaptation of Empire Falls.

Russo's 1997 novel Straight Man was adapted by Paul Lieberstein and Aaron Zelman into a television show entitled Lucky Hank starring Bob Odenkirk for AMC. The series debuted on March 19, 2023, on AMC.

== Personal life ==
Russo and his wife, Barbara, live in Portland, Maine, and spend winters in Boston. They have two daughters, Kate and Emily.

== Works ==
=== Novels ===
- Mohawk (Vintage Books, 1986)
- The Risk Pool (Random House, 1988)
- Nobody's Fool (Random House, 1993)
- Straight Man (Random House, 1997)
- Empire Falls (Alfred A. Knopf, 2001)
- Bridge of Sighs (Alfred A. Knopf, 2007)
- That Old Cape Magic (Alfred A. Knopf, 2009)
- Everybody's Fool (Alfred A. Knopf, 2016)
- Chances Are... (Alfred A. Knopf, 2019)
- Somebody's Fool (Alfred A. Knopf, 2023)
- Under the Falls (Alfred A. Knopf, 2026)

=== Short stories ===
- The Whore's Child and Other Stories (Alfred A. Knopf, 2002)
- Interventions, with illustrator Kate Russo (Down East Books, 2012)
- Trajectory: Stories (Alfred A. Knopf, 2017)
- Sh*tshow (Vintage, 2020)

=== Non-fiction ===
- Elsewhere: A Memoir (Alfred A. Knopf, 2012)
- The Destiny Thief: Essays on Writing, Writers and Life (Alfred A. Knopf, 2018)
- Marriage Story, An American Memoir (Scribd, 2021)
- Life and Art: Essays (Knopf, 2025)

== Filmography ==
- Monsters (1989) (TV)
- Nobody's Fool (1994) – based on his novel
- Twilight (with Robert Benton) (1998)
- The Flamingo Rising (2001) (TV)
- Brush with Fate (2003) (TV)
- Empire Falls (2005) (TV) – based on his novel
- The Ice Harvest (with Robert Benton) (2005)
- Keeping Mum (with Niall Johnson) (2005)
- Lucky Hank (2023) (TV) – based on his novel Straight Man
