= Chances Are... =

2019 novel by Richard Russo

- First edition (US)
- Author: Richard Russo
- Language: English
- Publisher: Alfred A. Knopf (US); Allen & Unwin (UK)
- Publication date: 2019
- Publication place: United States
- Media type: Print
- Pages: 320
- ISBN: 1-101-94774-8

Chances Are... is a mystery novel by American author Richard Russo. Initially published in 2019, it was his first standalone novel in a decade. The title is taken from a 1950s hit single by Johnny Mathis.

== Synopsis ==
"Chances Are..." is a slow-building mystery novel based around the disappearance of a young woman in 1971. Set primarily in 2015, with flashbacks to the characters’ coming-of-age in the 1960s and 1970s, the story follows three college friends who, now in their mid-60s, decided to reunite on the island of Martha’s Vineyard; the same place where the woman whom they all loved disappeared.

In the set-up, three young men meet at a college campus in Connecticut in the late 1960s. Lincoln, Teddy, and Mickey eventually fall in love with the gorgeous Jacy Calloway, despite her engagement to the “privileged, prep-school” Vance character.

Forty-four years later, the friends' lives have diverged. Lincoln is now happily married and a successful real estate broker with six children. Teddy is an editor and publisher of a small university press who is prone to panic attacks and disorientating spells that leave him depressed. Mickey is a renowned musician well-known for his temper. Relayed in chapters that alternate between the perspectives of mostly Lincoln and Teddy, the narrative touches on the Vietnam draft, Lincoln’s complicated relationship with his dogmatic father and meek mother, and an accident that befalls Teddy. The three friends try to uncover what happened to Jacy after she went into a vineyard cabin with some friends in 1971, and the truth is eventually revealed.

In "Chances Are...", Russo blends his signature themes: father-and-son relationships, unrequited love, New England small-town living, and the hiccups of aging.

== Reception ==
- Mark Lawson in The Guardian praised Russo: "His stories are omnisciently narrated in a tone of sardonic understanding of human folly, which places him in the house of American style on a polished mezzanine between the poetic complexity of John Updike and the gentler observation of Anne Tyler...around the shivers and guilts of a missing person story, Russo ultimately remains loyal to his previous mission to represent realistically the textures of average lives. The impeccably delayed revelation of what happened to Jacy is satisfying but more Russo than Ian Rankin. The gone girl turns out to have been caught in the novel's twin undercurrents of Vietnam and the hands' people are dealt: she has been very unlucky, but in a way that few will guess."
- In The New York Times, Alida Backer offered a generally positive review: "The suspense may carry you through the first half of the novel, but what works better is Russo's depiction of his central characters, with their father issues and insecurities about class and money, their ingrained cluelessness about women and their need to present a certain image to the world, even if they're pretty sure the world couldn't care less...the cloud of remorse that hangs over Chances Are… can be affecting precisely because these old friends have so much difficulty articulating their emotions. Will they be able to open up to whatever the future holds?"
- Ron Charles in The Washington Post presents a mixed review: Chances Are... rotates gently through these characters — each one so appealing that you hate to let him go, though you'll quickly feel just as fond of the next one...Unfortunately, Russo tries to complicate our understanding of Jacy by diving deeper into the mystery of her disappearance. That results in a long section of increasingly melodramatic revelations involving a host of offstage characters. But this isn't storytelling; it's gossip. Once the novel gets back to the present day, it regains a more nuanced and satisfying tone. Lincoln, Mickey, and especially Teddy are allowed a second chance at life they never expected. It's disappointing, though, to see how firmly such complexity is denied the female characters. Yet Russo is an undeniably endearing writer, and chances are this story will draw you back to the most consequential moments in your own life.
