= Straight Man =

1997 novel by Richard Russo

- First edition
- Author: Richard Russo
- Language: English
- Genre: Campus novel
- Publisher: Random House
- Publication date: 1997
- Media type: Print (hardcover)
- Pages: 391 pp.
- ISBN: 0679432469
- Dewey Decimal: 813/.54
- LC Class: PS3568.U812 S77 1997

Straight Man (New York: Random House, 1997) is a novel by American writer Richard Russo set at the fictional West Central Pennsylvania University in Railton, Pennsylvania. A campus novel, the book was inspired by Russo's experiences teaching at Southern Illinois University Carbondale, Southern Connecticut State University, and Penn State Altoona.

== Synopsis ==
Straight Man chronicles the mid-life crisis of William Henry Devereaux, Jr., the unlikely interim chairman of the English department at the fictional West Central Pennsylvania University in Railton, Pennsylvania. Notable moments include Devereaux hiding in the rafters as the faculty vote on his dismissal, and his threat to kill a duck in the campus pond each day until his department receives a budget. The novel discusses flirtations between faculty and students, satirizes academic scholarship and stardom, and portrays love and health in the season of grace.

== Reception ==
Straight Man was well received by critics, including starred reviews from Booklist, Kirkus Reviews, and Publishers Weekly. Tom De Haven of The New York Times praised Russo's use of humor and dialogue, writing,

The novel's greatest pleasures derive not from any blazing impatience to see what happens next, but from pitch-perfect dialogue, persuasive characterization and a rich progression of scenes, most of them crackling with an impudent, screwball energy.

Booklist named Straight Man one of the best books for adults published in 1997.

== Television series ==
A television series adaptation of the novel, entitled Lucky Hank, was developed at AMC and Tristar Television, with Aaron Zelman and Paul Lieberstein as showrunners and Bob Odenkirk as executive producer in addition to starring. In April 2022, a series order was released. It was scheduled for a second quarter 2023 premiere, with an eight-episode first season. In August 2022, it was reported that Mireille Enos joined the cast. In September 2022, Diedrich Bader, Sara Amini, Cedric Yarbrough and Suzanne Cryer joined the cast. In January 2023, the series was renamed Lucky Hank from the original title of Straight Man and also revealed to premiere on March 19, 2023. The series premiered on March 19, 2023, on AMC. In December 2023, the series was canceled after one season.
