= Winona Ryder filmography =

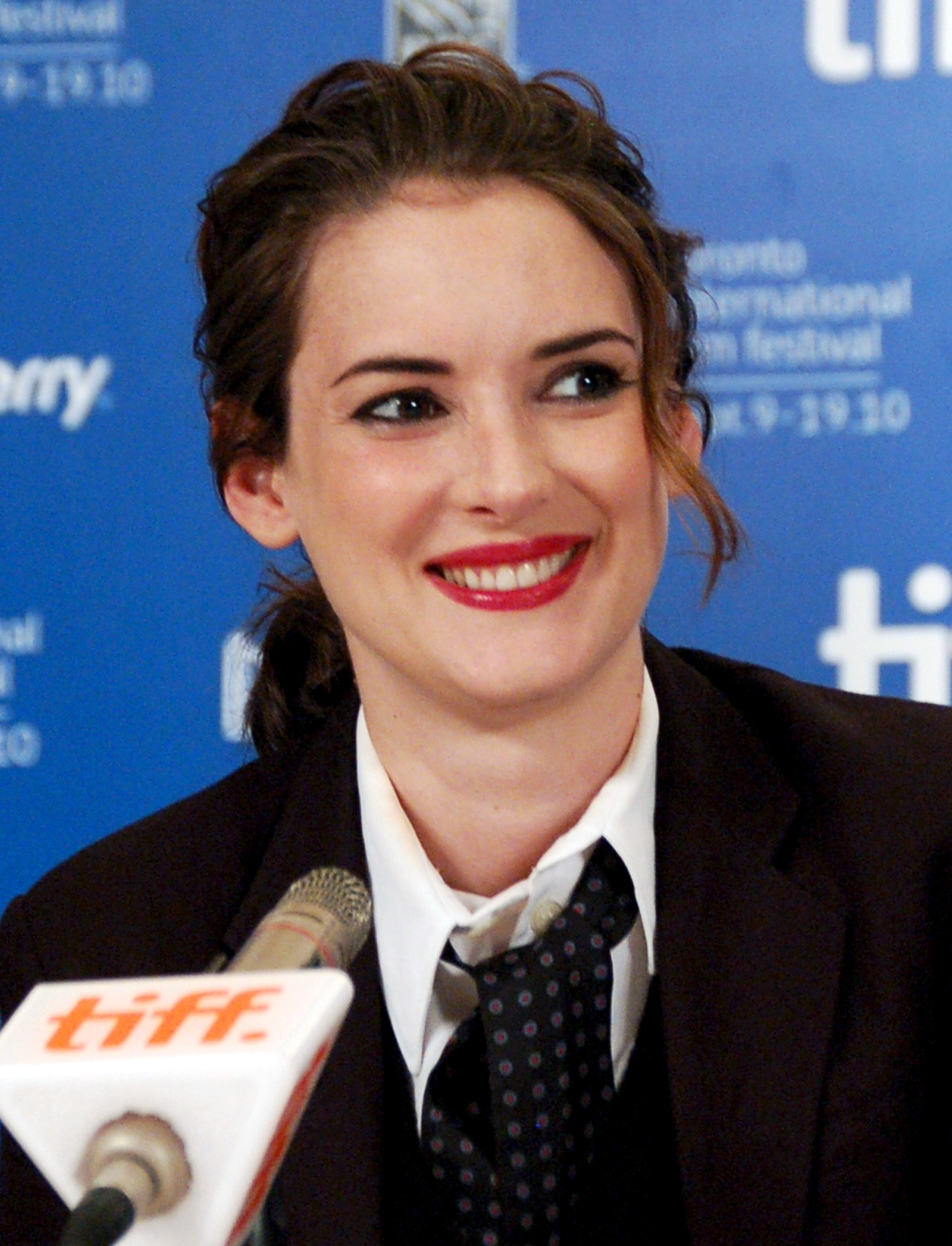
Ryder in 2010

Winona Ryder is an American actress who is known for taking on challenging roles in her earlier films, after which she went on to play more prominent roles in the 1990s. After Ryder's film debut in Lucas (1986), she gained attention with her performance in Tim Burton's Beetlejuice (1988). She further rose to prominence with major roles in Heathers (1988), Mermaids (1990), Edward Scissorhands (1990), Night on Earth (1991), and Bram Stoker's Dracula (1992). She garnered critical acclaim and two consecutive Academy Award nominations for her portrayals of socialite May Welland in Martin Scorsese's The Age of Innocence (1993) and Jo March in the fifth film adaptation of Little Women (1994). Her other films during this period were Reality Bites (1994), How to Make an American Quilt (1995), The Crucible (1996), Alien Resurrection (1997), Celebrity (1999), and Girl, Interrupted (1999), which she also executive-produced.

In 2002, Ryder starred in the critically panned box office hit Mr. Deeds, after which her career declined and she took a break from films. In 2009, she returned in the high-profile film Star Trek. In 2010, she was nominated for two Screen Actors Guild Awards: as the lead actress in the television film When Love Is Not Enough: The Lois Wilson Story and as part of the cast of Black Swan. She also reunited with Burton for Frankenweenie (2012). She has starred as Joyce Byers in the Netflix science fiction horror series Stranger Things (2016–2025), for which she has received Golden Globe and Screen Actors Guild nominations; and in 2020, she starred in the HBO drama miniseries The Plot Against America.

== Filmography ==
Key
| † | Denotes works that have not yet been released |

=== Film ===
| Year | Title | Role | Notes | Ref. |
|---|---|---|---|---|
| 1986 | Lucas | Rina Gifford | Film debut | |
| 1987 | Square Dance | Gemma Dillard | | |
| 1988 | Beetlejuice | Lydia Deetz | | |
| 1988 | 1969 | Beth Carr | | |
| 1989 | Heathers | Veronica Sawyer | | |
| 1989 | Great Balls of Fire! | Myra Gale Lewis | | |
| 1990 | Welcome Home, Roxy Carmichael | Dinky Bossetti | | |
| 1990 | Edward Scissorhands | Kim Boggs | | |
| 1990 | Mermaids | Charlotte Flax | | |
| 1991 | Night on Earth | Corky | Segment: "Los Angeles" | |
| 1992 | Bram Stoker's Dracula | Wilhelmina "Mina" Murray | | |
| 1993 | The Age of Innocence | May Welland | | |
| 1993 | The House of the Spirits | Blanca Trueba | | |
| 1994 | Reality Bites | Lelaina Pierce | | |
| 1994 | Little Women | Josephine "Jo" March | | |
| 1995 | How to Make an American Quilt | Finn Dodd | | |
| 1996 | Boys | Patty Vare | | |
| 1996 | Looking for Richard | Lady Anne | Documentary | |
| 1996 | The Crucible | Abigail Williams | | |
| 1997 | Alien Resurrection | Annalee Call | | |
| 1998 | Celebrity | Nola Newman | | |
| 1999 | Girl, Interrupted | Susanna Kaysen | Also executive producer | |
| 1999 | Being John Malkovich | Herself | Archive footage | |
| 2000 | Autumn in New York | Charlotte Fielding | | |
| 2000 | Lost Souls | Maya Larkin | | |
| 2001 | Zoolander | Herself | Uncredited cameo | |
| 2002 | Mr. Deeds | Babe Bennett / Pam Dawson | | |
| 2002 | S1m0ne | Nicola Anders | | |
| 2003 | The Day My God Died | Narrator | Documentary; also producer | |
| 2004 | The Heart Is Deceitful Above All Things | Psychologist | Uncredited | |
| 2006 | The Darwin Awards | Siri Taylor | | |
| 2006 | A Scanner Darkly | Donna Hawthorne | | |
| 2007 | The Ten | Kelly LaFonda | | |
| 2007 | Sex and Death 101 | Gillian De Raisx / Death Nell | | |
| 2007 | Welcome | Cynthia | Short film | |
| 2008 | The Last Word | Charlotte Morris | | |
| 2008 | The Informers | Cheryl Laine | | |
| 2009 | Water Pills | Carrie | Short film | |
| 2009 | The Private Lives of Pippa Lee | Sandra Dulles | | |
| 2009 | Stay Cool | Scarlet Smith | | |
| 2009 | Star Trek | Amanda Grayson | | |
| 2010 | Black Swan | Beth MacIntyre / The Dying Swan | | |
| 2011 | The Dilemma | Geneva Brannen | | |
| 2012 | Frankenweenie | Elsa Van Helsing | Voice | |
| 2012 | The Letter | Martine | | |
| 2012 | The Iceman | Deborah Kuklinski | | |
| 2012 | Ben Lee: Catch My Disease | Herself | Documentary | |
| 2013 | Homefront | Sheryl Mott | | |
| 2015 | Experimenter | Sasha Menkin Milgram | | |
| 2018 | Destination Wedding | Lindsay | | |
| 2022 | Gone in the Night | Kath | | |
| 2023 | Haunted Mansion | Pat | Uncredited | |
| 2024 | Beetlejuice Beetlejuice | Lydia Deetz | | |

=== Television ===
| Year | Title | Role | Notes | Ref. |
|---|---|---|---|---|
| 1994 | The Simpsons | Allison Taylor | Voice, episode: "Lisa's Rival" | |
| 1996 | Dr. Katz, Professional Therapist | Winona | Voice, episode: "Monte Carlo" | |
| 1998 | The Larry Sanders Show | Herself | Episode: "Another List" | |
| 2000 | Strangers with Candy | Fran | Episode: "The Last Temptation of Blank" | |
| 2001 | Friends | Melissa Warburton | Episode: "The One with Rachel's Big Kiss" | |
| 2002 | Saturday Night Live | Herself / Host | Episode: "Winona Ryder/Moby" | |
| 2010 | When Love Is Not Enough | Lois Wilson | Television film | |
| 2013–2014 | Drunk History | Mary Dyer / Peggy Shippen | 2 episodes | |
| 2014 | Turks & Caicos | Melanie Fall | Television film | |
| 2015 | Show Me a Hero | Vinni Restiano | 4 episodes | |
| 2016–2025 | Stranger Things | Joyce Byers | Main role | |
| 2020 | The Plot Against America | Evelyn Finkel | Main role | |
| 2020 | Sarah Cooper: Everything's Fine | Lacey Groin | Television special | |
| 2027 | Wednesday† | Tabitha | Main role | |

=== Music videos ===
| Year | Title | Artist | Role | Ref. |
|---|---|---|---|---|
| 1989 | "Debbie Gibson Is Pregnant with My Two-Headed Love Child" | Mojo Nixon & Skid Roper | Pregnant Bride Debbie Gibson | |
| 1990 | "The Shoop Shoop Song (It's in His Kiss)" | Cher | Herself / Charlotte Flax | |
| 1992 | "Love Song for a Vampire" | Annie Lennox | Wilhelmina "Mina" Murray | |
| 1993 | "Locked Out" | Crowded House | Herself | |
| 1998 | "Talk About the Blues" | Jon Spencer Blues Explosion | Jon Spencer | |
| 2012 | "Here with Me" | The Killers | Wax Girl | |
| 2026 | "Punk Rocky" | ASAP Rocky | A Neighbor | |

== See also ==
- List of awards and nominations received by Winona Ryder
