= List of awards and nominations received by Winona Ryder =

Winona Ryder awards and nominations
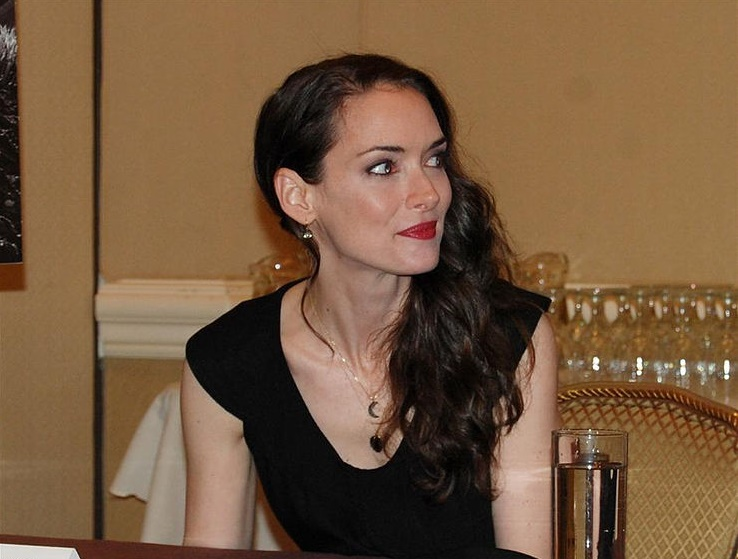
- Ryder at a press conference for Frankenweenie in 2012
Awards and nominations
Award	Wins	Nominations

Totals (Note: Certain award groups do not simply award one winner. They acknowledge several different recipients, have runners-up, and have third place. Since this is a specific recognition and is different from losing an award, runner-up mentions are considered wins in this award tally. For simplification and to avoid errors, each award in this list has been presumed to have had a prior nomination.)
- Wins: 25
- Nominations: 77

This article is a List of awards and nominations received by Winona Ryder.

Winona Ryder is an American actress known for her roles in film and television. She has received various accolades including a Golden Globe Award and a Screen Actors Guild Award as well as nominations for two Academy Awards, a BAFTA Award, two Critics' Choice Awards, a Emmy Award and a Grammy Award. She received a Motion Picture star on the Hollywood Walk of Fame in 2000.

At age 23, she has been nominated for Best Supporting Actress at the 66th Academy Awards for her performance's in The Age of Innocence—making her one of the youngest artists in the Academy of Motion Picture Arts and Sciences to be nominated. The following year, at the 67th Academy Awards, Ryder's performance in Little Women earned her another nomination for the Best Actress. Ryder earned a Golden Globe nomination in the coming of age drama Mermaids (1990). Ryder won a Golden Globe Award for Best Supporting Actress and an Academy Award nomination in the same category for her role in The Age of Innocence in 1993, as well as another Academy Award nomination for Best Actress for her role in the film adaptation of Little Women the following year. In 1995, she was nominated for a SAG Award as part of the cast of How to Make an American Quilt.

In 2010, she was nominated for two Screen Actors Guild Awards: as the lead actress in When Love Is Not Enough: The Lois Wilson Story and as part of the cast of Black Swan. For her performance as Joyce Byers in the Netflix supernatural horror series Stranger Things, she earned a Golden Globe nomination and two SAG nominations, winning a SAG as part of the show's ensemble in 2017.

== Major associations ==
=== Academy Awards ===
Year	Category	Nominated work	Result	Ref.
1993	Best Supporting Actress	The Age of Innocence	Nominated	
1994	Best Actress	Little Women	Nominated	

=== BAFTA Awards ===
Year	Category	Nominated work	Result	Ref.
BAFTA Film Awards
1993	Best Actress in a Supporting Role	The Age of Innocence	Nominated	

=== Critics Choice Awards ===
Year	Category	Nominated work	Result	Ref.
Critics' Choice Television Award
2016	Best Supporting Actress in a Movie/Miniseries	Show Me a Hero	Nominated	
2021	Best Supporting Actress in a Movie/Miniseries	The Plot Against America	Nominated	

=== Emmy Awards ===
Year	Category	Nominated work	Result	Ref.
News & Documentary Emmy Award
2005	Best Documentary	Independent Lens	Nominated	

=== Golden Globe Awards ===
Year	Category	Nominated work	Result	Ref.
1990	Best Supporting Actress – Motion Picture	Mermaids	Nominated	
1993	Best Supporting Actress – Motion Picture	The Age of Innocence	Won	
2016	Best Actress – Television Series Drama	Stranger Things	Nominated	

=== Grammy Awards ===
Year	Category	Nominated work	Result	Ref.
1996	Best Spoken Word Album for Children	The Diary of a Young Girl	Nominated	

=== Screen Actors Guild Awards ===
Year	Category	Nominated work	Result	Ref.
1995	Outstanding Cast in a Motion Picture	The cast of How to Make an American Quilt (Note: Shared with Maya Angelou, Anne Bancroft, Ellen Burstyn, Samantha Mathis, Kate Nelligan, Jean Simmons, Lois Smith and Alfre Woodard.)	Nominated	
2010	Outstanding Cast in a Motion Picture	The cast of Black Swan (Note: Shared with Vincent Cassel, Barbara Hershey, Mila Kunis and Natalie Portman.)	Nominated	
2010	Outstanding Actress in a Miniseries or Television Movie	When Love Is Not Enough: The Lois Wilson Story	Nominated	
2016	Outstanding Actress in a Drama Series	Stranger Things	Nominated	
2016	Outstanding Ensemble in a Drama Series	The cast of Stranger Things (season 1) (Note: Shared with Millie Bobby Brown, Cara Buono, Joe Chrest, Natalia Dyer, David Harbour, Charlie Heaton, Joe Keery, Gaten Matarazzo, Caleb McLaughlin, Matthew Modine, Rob Morgan, John Paul Reynolds, Noah Schnapp, Mark Steger and Finn Wolfhard.)	Won	
2017	Outstanding Ensemble in a Drama Series	The cast of Stranger Things (season 2) (Note: Shared with Sean Astin, Millie Bobby Brown, Cara Buono, Joe Chrest, Catherine Curtin, Natalia Dyer, David Harbour, Charlie Heaton, Joe Keery, Gaten Matarazzo, Caleb McLaughlin, Dacre Montgomery, Paul Reiser, Noah Schnapp, Sadie Sink and Finn Wolfhard.)	Nominated	
2010	Outstanding Ensemble in a Drama Series	The cast of Stranger Things (season 3)	Nominated	

== Miscellaneous awards ==
List of awards and nominations received by Winona Ryder
Organizations (Note: Awards, festivals, honors and other miscellaneous organizations are listed in alphabetical order.)	Year (Note: Year in which award ceremony was held.)	Category	Work	Result	Ref.
AARP Movies for Grownups Awards	2025	Best Ensemble	Beetlejuice Beetlejuice	Nominated	
Alliance of Women Film Journalists	2011	Perseverance Award †	Winona Ryder	Nominated	
Astra TV Awards	2022	Best Actress in a Streaming Series, Drama	Stranger Things	Nominated	
Blockbuster Entertainment Awards	1998	Favorite Supporting Actress – Sci-Fi	Alien: Resurrection	Won	
Blockbuster Entertainment Awards	2000	Favorite Actress – Drama	Girl, Interrupted	Nominated	
Boston Society of Film Critics Awards	2009	Best Cast	Star Trek	Won	
Bravo Otto	1994	Best Actress	Little Women	Nominated	
Capricho Awards	2001	Best International Artist	Winona Ryder	Nominated	
Chicago Film Critics Association Awards	1988	Best Actress	Heathers	Nominated	
Chicago Film Critics Association Awards	1993	Best Supporting Actress	The Age of Innocence	Nominated	
Chicago Film Critics Association Awards	1994	Best Actress	Little Women	Nominated	
Chlotrudis Society Awards	1995	Best Actress	Little Women	Nominated	
Dorian Awards	2017	TV Performance of the Year - Actress	Stranger Things	Nominated	
Fangoria Chainsaw Awards	1993	Best Actress	Bram Stoker's Dracula	Nominated	
Fangoria Chainsaw Awards	2017	Best TV Supporting Actress	Stranger Things	Won	
Giffoni Film Festival	2009	Award of 2009 †	Winona Ryder	Won	
Golden Raspberry Awards	2001	Worst Screen Couple	Autumn in New York	Nominated (Note: Shared with Richard Gere)	
Golden Raspberry Awards	2003	Worst Actress	Mr. Deeds	Nominated	
Hollywood Walk of Fame	2000	Motion pictures	Winona Ryder	Won	
iHorror Awards	2017	Best Actress - Horror Series	Stranger Things	Won	
Independent Spirit Awards	1990	Best Actress	Heathers	Nominated	
Jupiter Award	1994	Best International Actress	The Age of Innocence; Bram Stoker's Dracula; The House of the Spirits	Won	
Kansas City Film Critics Circle Awards	1994	Best Actress	Little Women	Won	
Movieguide Awards	2011	Most Inspiring Television Acting	When Love Is Not Enough: The Lois Wilson Story	Nominated	
MTV Movie & TV Awards	1993	Best Kiss	Dracula	Nominated (Note: Shared with Gary Oldman)	
MTV Movie & TV Awards	1994	Best Kiss	Reality Bites	Nominated (Note: Shared with Ethan Hawke)	
MTV Movie & TV Awards	1996	Best Kiss	How to Make an American Quilt	Nominated (Note: Shared with Dermot Mulroney)	
MTV Movie & TV Awards	2017	Trending	Winona Ryder's Winning the 23rd Annual SAG Awards reaction	Nominated	
National Board of Review Awards	1990	Best Supporting Actress	Mermaids	Won	
National Board of Review Awards	1993	Best Supporting Actress	The Age of Innocence	Won	
New York Film Critics Circle	1993	Best Supporting Actress	The Age of Innocence	Nominated	
Nickelodeon Kids' Choice Awards	2025	Favorite Movie Actress	Beetlejuice Beetlejuice	Nominated	
Prism Awards	2011	Performance in a TV Movie or Miniseries	When Love Is Not Enough: The Lois Wilson Story	Nominated	
San Francisco International Film Festival	2000	Peter J. Owens Award †	Winona Ryder	Won	
Sant Jordi Awards	1992	Best Foreign Actress	Edward Scissorhands; Mermaids	Won	
Satellite Awards	2010	Best Actress – Miniseries or Television Film	When Love Is Not Enough: The Lois Wilson Story	Nominated	
Satellite Awards	2017	Best Actress – Television Series Drama	Stranger Things	Nominated	
Satellite Awards	2025	Best Actress – Comedy or Musical	Beetlejuice Beetlejuice	Nominated	
Saturn Awards	1992	Best Actress	Edward Scissorhands	Nominated	
Saturn Awards	1993	Best Actress	Dracula	Nominated	
Saturn Awards	1998	Best Supporting Actress	Alien: Resurrection	Nominated	
Saturn Awards	2017	Best Actress on Television	Stranger Things	Nominated	
Saturn Awards	2025	Best Actress in a Film	Beetlejuice Beetlejuice	Nominated	
Southeastern Film Critics Association	1993	Best Supporting Actress	The Age of Innocence	Won	
Scream Awards	2009	Best Cameo	Star Trek	Won	
Shorty Awards	2018	GIF of the Year	Winona Ryder's Face at the SAG Awards	Nominated	
ShoWest Convention Awards	1990	Female Star of Tomorrow	Winona Ryder	Won	
ShoWest Convention Awards	1997	Female Star of the Year	Winona Ryder	Won	
Smash Hits Poll Winners Party	1991	Most Fanciable Female on the Planet	Winona Ryder	Nominated	
Smash Hits Poll Winners Party	1991	Best Film Actress	Winona Ryder	Runner-up	
Smash Hits Poll Winners Party	1992	Best Film Actress	Winona Ryder	Won	
Smash Hits Poll Winners Party	1992	Worst Film Actress	Winona Ryder	Nominated	
Smash Hits Poll Winners Party	1992	Worst Dressed	Winona Ryder	Nominated	
Smash Hits Poll Winners Party	1992	Most Fanciable Female on the Planet	Winona Ryder	Nominated	
Smash Hits Poll Winners Party	1992	Least Fanciable Female on the Planet	Winona Ryder	Nominated	
Smash Hits Poll Winners Party	1994	Best Film Actress	Winona Ryder	Won	
Smash Hits Poll Winners Party	1996	Best Film Actress	Winona Ryder	Nominated	
Stinkers Bad Movie Awards	1998	Worst Supporting Actress	Alien: Resurrection	Nominated	
Stinkers Bad Movie Awards	2001	Worst Actress	Autumn in New York	Nominated	
Stinkers Bad Movie Awards	2001	Worst On-Screen Couple	Autumn in New York	Nominated	
Teen Choice Awards	2002	Choice Movie Actress – Comedy	Mr. Deeds	Nominated	
Torino Film Festival (Note: Previously known as Torino International Festival of Young Cinema.)	1989	International Feature Film Competition	Heathers	Won	
Young Artist Award	1990	Best Young Artist Starring in a Motion Picture	Great Balls of Fire!	Won	

== See also ==
- List of Academy Award records
- List of actors with two or more Academy Award nominations in acting categories
- List of actors with Academy Award nominations
- List of stars on the Hollywood Walk of Fame
- List of actors with Hollywood Walk of Fame motion picture stars
