= Mermaids (novel) =

1986 novel by Patty Dann

- First edition cover
- Author: Patty Dann
- Language: English
- Genre: Bildungsroman
- Publisher: Ticknor and Fields
- Publication date: September 1, 1986
- Publication place: United States
- Media type: Print (Hardcover)
- Pages: 147
- ISBN: 978-0-899-19471-4

Mermaids is a 1986 coming-of-age novel by American writer Patty Dann, published in 1986 by Ticknor and Fields. Its plot follows a 14-year-old girl growing up with a wayward single mother in 1960s New England. It was adapted into a feature film of the same name in 1990, starring Cher and Winona Ryder.

== Background ==
Dann, a graduate of the University of Oregon and Columbia University, was working as a secretary in 1984, having abandoned her career aspiration of becoming a writer. In 1986, while working as a secretary for A&E, she began revising Mermaids, a period piece coming-of-age novel about a teenage girl set in the 1960s, a draft of which she had submitted as her MFA thesis. During the redrafting process, she changed the narrative perspective from third-person to first-person. After completing the redrafting of the novel, Dann found a literary agent who sold the novel to Ticknor and Fields, who published it in 1986.

== Adaptation ==
In 1990, Richard Benjamin directed a critically acclaimed feature film adaptation of the novel, starring Cher and Winona Ryder.
