= List of Smash Hits Poll Winners Party winners =

List of Smash Hits Poll Winners Party awards

The Smash Hits Poll Winners Party was an awards ceremony which ran from 1979 to 1987 as the Smash Hits Readers' Poll, then on television from 1988 to 2005.

== 1979 awards ==
The results for the 1979 Smash Hits Readers' Poll were published in the 20 March 1980 issue of the magazine.

- Band of the Year: The Police
- Best Male Singer: Sting
- Best Female Singer: Debbie Harry
- Best Album of the Year: Reggatta de Blanc by the Police
- TV Programme of the Year: Top of the Pops
- Best DJ/Radio Show of the Year: John Peel
- Most Fanciable Person: Sting
- Best Single of the Year: "Message in a Bottle" by the Police
- Worst Single of the Year: "One Day at a Time" by Lena Martell
- Brightest Hope for 1980: Madness
- Twerp of the Year: Gary Numan
- Bore of the Year: Lena Martell

== 1980 awards ==
The results for the 1980 Smash Hits Readers' Poll were published in the 18 March 1981 issue of the magazine.

- Band of the Year: The Police
- Male Singer of the Year: Gary Numan
- Female Singer of the Year: Kate Bush
- Hottest New Act for 1981: Spandau Ballet
- Best Album of the Year: Zenyatta Mondatta by the Police
- Best Film of the Year: Breaking Glass
- TV Programme of the Year: Not the Nine O'Clock News
- Radio Show of the Year: John Peel
- Most Fanciable Male: Sting
- Most Fanciable Female: Debbie Harry
- Best Single of the Year: "Message in a Bottle" by the Police
- Worst Single of the Year: "Grandma" by St Winifred's School Choir

== 1981 awards ==
The results for the 1981 Smash Hits Readers Poll were published in the 24 December 1981 issue of the magazine.

- Best Group: Adam and the Ants
- Best Female Singer: Toyah Willcox
- Best Male Singer: Gary Numan
- Best Album: Dare by the Human League
- Best Single: "Tainted Love" by Soft Cell
- Best TV Programme: Top of the Pops
- Best Radio Show: Radio One Top 40
- Most Appalling Record: "O Superman" by Laurie Anderson
- Most Promising New Act for 1982: Altered Images
- Most Fanciable Male Human Being of the Year: Adam Ant
- Most Fanciable Female Human Being of the Year: Toyah Willcox

== 1982 awards ==
The results for the 1982 Smash Hits Readers Poll were published were published in the 23 December 1982 issue of the magazine.

- Best Group: Duran Duran
- Best Female Singer: Toyah Willcox
- Best Male Singer: Simon Le Bon
- Best Album: Rio by Duran Duran
- Best Single: "Save a Prayer" by Duran Duran
- Best TV Programme: Top of the Pops
- Best Radio DJ: Mike Read
- Most Promising New Act for 1983: Tears for Fears
- Most Fanciable Male Human Being of the Year: Simon Le Bon
- Most Fanciable Female Human Being of the Year: Kim Wilde
- Most Annoying Record: "Wot" by Captain Sensible

== 1983 awards ==
The results for the 1983 Smash Hits Readers Poll were published were published in the 22 December 1983 issue of the magazine.

- Best Group: Duran Duran
- Best Female Singer: Tracey Ullman
- Best Male Singer: Simon Le Bon
- Best Album: Fantastic by Wham!
- Best Single: "Karma Chameleon" by Culture Club
- Best Video: "Union of the Snake" by Duran Duran
- Twit(s) of the Year: Black Lace
- Event of the Year: Duran Duran's charity concert at Villa Park 1983
- Best TV Programme: Top of the Pops
- Best Radio DJ: Mike Read
- Most Promising Act for 1984: Howard Jones
- Most Fanciable Male Human Being of the Year: John Taylor
- Most Fanciable Female Human Being of the Year: Tracie Young

== 1984 awards ==
The results for the 1984 Smash Hits Readers Poll were published in the 20 December 1984 issue of the magazine.

- Best Group: Duran Duran
- Best Female Singer: Alison Moyet
- Best Male Singer: Simon Le Bon
- Best Album: Seven and the Ragged Tiger by Duran Duran
- Best Single: "The Wild Boys" by Duran Duran
- Best TV Programme: The Young Ones
- Best Radio DJ: Mike Read
- Best Video: "The Wild Boys" by Duran Duran
- Prat of the Year: Boy George
- Event of the Year: Roger Taylor wedding
- Most Promising New Act for 1985: Julian Lennon
- Most Fanciable Male Human Being of the Year: John Taylor
- Most Fanciable Female Human Being of the Year: Kim Wilde

== 1985 awards ==
The results for the 1985 Smash Hits Readers Poll were published in the 18 December 1985 issue of the magazine.

- Best Group: Duran Duran
- Best Male Singer: Simon Le Bon
- Best Female Singer: Madonna
- Best Single: "A View to a Kill" by Duran Duran
- Best LP: Like a Virgin by Madonna
- Best Video: "Take On Me" by A-ha
- Best Music TV Programme: Top of the Pops
- Best Non-music TV: EastEnders
- Best DJ: Steve Wright
- Best Film: Desperately Seeking Susan
- Best TV Advertisement: OXO
- Event of the Year: Live Aid
- The Non-event of the Year: Madonna wedding
- Best Dressed Person: John Taylor
- Most Brilliant Haircut: Simon Le Bon
- Most Promising New Act for 1986: A-ha
- Most Fanciable Male of the Year: John Taylor
- Most Fanciable Female of the Year: Madonna
- Most Wonderful Human Being of the Year: Bob Geldof
- Biggest Prat of the Year: George Michael
- Worst Group: Wham!
- Worst Male Singer: George Michael
- Worst Female Singer: Madonna
- Worst Single: "The Power of Love" by Jennifer Rush
- Worst LP: Born in the U.S.A. by Bruce Springsteen
- Worst Video: "If I Was" by Midge Ure
- Worst TV Programme: Top of the Pops
- Worst Non-music TV: Crossroads
- Worst DJ: Mike Read
- Worst Film: Rambo: First Blood Part II
- Worst TV Advertisement: Nescafé
- Worst Dressed Person: Bob Geldof
- Most Useless Haircut: Simon Le Bon
- Least Promising New Act for 1985: Arcadia
- Most Very Horrible Thing of the Year: George Michael's beard

== 1986 awards ==
The results for the 1986 Smash Hits Readers Poll were published in the 16 December 1986 issue of the magazine.

- Best Group: A-ha
- Best Male Singer: Morten Harket
- Best Female Singer: Madonna
- Best Single: "Notorious" by Duran Duran
- Best LP: True Blue by Madonna
- Best Video: "Sledgehammer" by Peter Gabriel
- Best Music TV Programme: Top of the Pops
- Best Non-music TV: EastEnders
- Best DJ: Mike Smith
- Best Film: Top Gun
- Best TV Advertisement: Levi's
- Most Promising New Act for 1987: The Housemartins
- Most Fanciable Male of the Year: John Taylor
- Most Fanciable Female of the Year: Madonna
- Worst Male Singer: Morten Harket
- Worst Female Singer: Madonna
- Worst Video: "True Blue" by Madonna
- Worst TV Programme: Crossroads
- Worst DJ: Mike Read
- Worst TV Advertisement: Nescafé
- Worst Dressed Person: Bob Geldof
- Most Completely Useless Person: Margaret Thatcher
- Most Very Horrible Thing of the Year: George Michael

== 1987 awards ==
The results for the 1987 Smash Hits Readers Poll was published in the 6 October 1987 issue of the magazine.

- Best Group: Five Star
- Best Male Singer: Michael Jackson
- Best Female Singer: Madonna
- Best Video: "Bad" by Michael Jackson
- Best Single: "Never Gonna Give You Up" by Rick Astley
- Best LP: Bad by Michael Jackson
- Best TV Advertisement: Carling Black Label
- Best Film: Crocodile Dundee
- Best DJ: Mike Smith
- Best Music TV Programme: Top of the Pops
- Best Non-music TV: EastEnders
- Best Dressed Person: Jonathan Ross
- Most Promising New Act for 1988: Wet Wet Wet
- Most Wonderful Human Being of the Year
- Most Fanciable Male of the Year: Phillip Schofield
- Most Fanciable Female of the Year: Madonna
- Worst Group: Beastie Boys
- Worst Male Singer: Terence Trent D'Arby
- Worst Female Singer: Samantha Fox
- Worst Video: "Star Trekkin'" by the Firm
- Worst Single: "Star Trekkin'" by the Firm
- Worst LP: Bad by Michael Jackson
- Worst TV Advertisement: Nescafé
- Worst Film: Superman IV: The Quest for Peace
- Worst DJ: Janice Long
- Worst TV Programme: Crossroads
- Worst Dressed Person: Bob Geldof
- Most Completely Useless Person: Margaret Thatcher

== 1988 awards ==
The 1988 Smash Hits Poll Winners Party ceremony was held on Sunday, 30 October 1988 at The Royal Albert Hall in London. The party was broadcast on BBC and Radio One from 3.30-5 pm. Phillip Schofield introduced the show. The results for the 1988 Smash Hits Readers Poll were published in the 15 November 1988 issue of the magazine.

- Best Group: Bros
- Best Male Solo Singer: Michael Jackson
- Best Female Solo Singer: Kylie Minogue
- Best House/Rap/Dance Music Act: Salt 'N' Pepa
- Most Promising Solo Artist: Yazz
- Most Promising New Group: Brother Beyond
- Best D.J: Bruno Brookes
- Most Fanciable Male: Matt Goss
- Most Fanciable Female: Kylie Minogue
- Best Dressed Person: Matt Goss
- Best Single: "I Owe You Nothing" by Bros
- Best LP: Popped In Souled Out by Wet Wet Wet
- Best Film: Dirty Dancing
- Best Pop Video: "I Owe You Nothing" by Bros
- Best Music TV Programme: Top of the Pops
- Best Non Music TV Programme: Neighbours
- Best TV Advert: Coca-Cola
- Worst Group of the Year: Bros
- Worst Male Solo singer: Glenn Medeiros
- Worst Female Solo singer: Tiffany Darwish
- Worst House/Rap/Dance Music Act: Salt 'N' Pepa
- Worst D.J: Tony Blackburn
- Worst Dressed Person: Rick Astley
- Most Completely Useless Person: Margaret Thatcher
- Worst Haircut: Glenn Medeiros
- Most Horrible Thing: Spiders
- Worst Single: "Nothing's Gonna Change My Love for You" by Glenn Medeiros
- Worst LP: by Push by Bros
- Worst Film: Teen Wolf Too
- Worst Pop Video: "Nothing's Gonna Change My Love for You" by Glenn Medeiros
- Worst TV Programme: EastEnders
- Worst TV Advert: Nescafé

== 1989 awards ==
Phillip Schofield was the host at Docklands Arena on 29 October 1989.

- Best Group: Bros
- Best Male Solo Singer: Jason Donovan
- Best Female Solo Singer: Kylie Minogue
- Best Rock Outfit Singer: Guns N' Roses
- Best House/Dance Act: Neneh Cherry
- Best Newcomer: Big Fun
- Best Single: "Too Much" by Bros
- Best LP: Ten Good Reasons by Jason Donovan
- Best Pop Video: "Too Much" by Bros
- Most Promising New Solo Artist: Bobby Brown
- Best DJ: Bruno Brookes
- Most Fanciable Male on the Planet: Jason Donovan
- Most Fanciable Female on the Planet: Kylie Minogue
- Best Film: Batman 1989
- Best Music TV Programme: Top of the Pops
- Best Non-music TV Programme: Neighbours
- Most Very Horrible Thing: Spiders
- Worst Dressed Person: Prince
- Worst Haircut: Pat Sharp

== 1990 awards ==
Phillip Schofield was the host at Docklands Arena on 11 November 1990.

- Best New Act: Betty Boo
- Best Group: New Kids on the Block
- Best Male Singer: Jason Donovan
- Best Female Singer: Madonna
- Best Rock Act: Jon Bon Jovi
- Best Dance Act: MC Hammer
- Best Single: "Tonight" by New Kids on the Block
- Best LP: Step by Step by New Kids on the Block
- Best Pop Video: "Opposites Attract" by Paula Abdul
- Best Dressed Person: Joey McIntyre
- Best DJ: Bruno Brookes
- Most Fanciable Man of the Year: Joey McIntyre
- Best Film: Gremlins 2
- Best Music TV Programme: Top of the Pops
- Best Non-music Programme: Home and Away
- Worst Single: "Itsy Bitsy Teeny Weeny Yellow Polka Dot Bikini" by Bombalurina
- Worst Dressed Person: Kylie Minogue
- Most Completely Useless Person: Timmy Mallett
- Worst Haircut: Pat Sharp

== 1991 awards ==
Phillip Schofield was the host at Docklands Arena on 26 October 1991. The event was notorious for the incident in 1991 involving Phillip Schofield and Carter USM, when the band's performance was cut short, causing them to trash up the stage. Following this, Schofield made a remark about the band's behaviour, their guitarist Fruitbat rugby tackled him to the floor. The band was temporarily banned from performing on television but ticket sales for its tour soared.

- Best New Act: Dannii Minogue
- Best New Group: Color Me Badd
- Best Group in the World: New Kids on the Block
- Best British Group: EMF
- Best Female Solo Singer: Madonna
- Best Male Solo Singer: Jason Donovan
- Best Dance Act: Marky Mark and the Funky Bunch
- Best Indie Act: The Farm
- Best Rock Outfit: Extreme
- Best Single: "(Everything I Do) I Do It for You" by Bryan Adams
- Best LP: No More Games/The Remix Album by New Kids on the Block
- Best Pop Video: "Call It What You Want" by New Kids on the Block
- Best Dressed Person: Jordan Knight
- Best DJ: Bruno Brookes
- Most Fanciable Male on the Planet: Jordan Knight
- Most Fanciable Female on the Planet: Madonna
- Best Film: Robin Hood: Prince of Thieves
- Best Male Actor: Christian Slater
- Best Female Actor: Julia Roberts
- Best Music TV Programme: Top of the Pops
- Best Non-music TV Programme: Beverly Hills, 90210
- Worst Group: New Kids on the Block
- Worst Female Solo Singer: Kylie Minogue
- Worst Male Solo Singer: Chesney Hawkes
- Worst Single: "The One and Only" by Chesney Hawkes
- Worst LP: Buddy's Song by Chesney Hawkes
- Worst Pop Video: "The One and Only" by Chesney Hawkes
- Worst Dressed Person: Timmy Mallett
- Worst Film: Teenage Mutant Ninja Turtles II: The Secret of the Ooze
- Worst Haircut: Chesney Hawkes
- Worst TV Programme: Brookside
- The Most Completely Useless Person: Timmy Mallett

== 1992 awards ==
The 1992 Smash Hits Poll Winners Party ceremony, honored the best and worst music, films and TV of 1992 from December 1991 to December 1992 and took place on 6 December 1992, at Olympia in London. Simon Mayo and New Kids on the Block member Jordan Knight hosted the event.

- Hero of 1992: Linford Christie
- Best New Act: The Shamen
- Best British Group: Take That
- Best Group in the World: Take That
- Best Male Solo Singer: Michael Jackson
- Best Female Solo Singer: Madonna
- Best Single: "A Million Love Songs" by Take That
- Best LP: Take That & Party by Take That
- Best Video: "I Found Heaven" by Take That
- Best Film: Wayne's World
- Best Film Actor: Christian Slater
- Best Film Actress: Winona Ryder
- Best TV Programme: Home and Away
- Best TV Actor: Les Hill
- Best TV Actress: Rebekah Elmaloglou
- Best Dance Act: Marky Mark
- Best Rock Outfit: Extreme
- Best Indie Act: The Farm
- Most Fanciable Male: Mark Owen
- Most Fanciable Female: Madonna
- Best Haircut: Mark Owen
- Best Dressed Person: Jordan Knight
- Best DJ: Bruno Brookes
- Villain of 1992: John Major
- Worst Group: New Kids on the Block
- Worst Male Solo Singer: Jason Donovan
- Worst Female Solo Singer: Dannii
- Worst Video: "Ebeneezer Goode" by the Shamen
- Worst Film: Batman Returns
- Worst Film Actor/Actress: Madonna
- Worst TV Programme: Eldorado
- Worst TV Actor/Actress: Melissa Bell
- Worst Dressed Person: Madonna
- Least Fanciable Male Star: Jimmy Nail
- Least Fanciable Female Star: Madonna

== 1993 awards ==
Andi Peters and Will Smith were the hosts at Wembley Arena on 5 December 1993.

1993 was the year that introduced the "Best New Roadshow Act" award which would launch new acts who would perform on the Smash Hits Tour previous to the event; the winners would be voted by fans at the show of which US pop band E.Y.C. (Damon Butler, Dave Loeffler and Trey Parker) were the first to win this award and perform their new single "Feelin' Alright". The award would later launch the careers of Boyzone, Backstreet Boys, Five and many others in the following years.

- Best British Group: Take That
- Best Male Solo Singer: Michael Jackson
- Best Female Solo Singer: Whitney Houston
- Best New Roadshow Act: E.Y.C.
- Best New Act: Eternal
- Most Fanciable Male Star: Mark Owen
- Best Dancer in Pop: Jason Orange
- Best Dance Act: 2 Unlimited
- Best Rock Act: Meat Loaf
- Best Group in the World: Take That
- Best Album: Everything Changes by Take That
- Best Pop Video: Pray by Take That
- Best Single: Boom! Shake the Room by DJ Jazzy Jeff & the Fresh Prince
- Best Radio DJ: Neil Fox
- Best Haircut: Robbie Williams
- Best Dressed Person: Mark Owen
- Best Film Actor: Tom Cruise
- Best Film Actress: Whoopi Goldberg
- Best Person on Telly: Chris Evans
- Best TV Programme: The Big Breakfast
- Best Film: Jurassic Park
- Least Fanciable Male Star: Brian Harvey
- Worst Film Actress: Madonna
- Worst Film: Body of Evidence
- Worst Female Singer: Madonna
- Worst Dressed Person: Madonna
- Worst TV programme: Emmerdale
- Worst Person on Telly: Jeremy Beadle
- Sad Loser of 1993: John Major
- Most Tragic Haircut: Brian Harvey

== 1994 awards ==
Andi Peters with actor Dean Cain and volleyball player Gabrielle Reece were the hosts at Docklands Arena on 4 December 1994.

- Best New Act: PJ and Duncan
- Best British Group: Take That
- Best Group in the World: Take That
- Best Male Solo Singer: Sean Maguire
- Best Female Solo Singer: Mariah Carey
- Best Rock Act: Bon Jovi
- Best Indie Act: Blur
- Best Dance Act: 2 Unlimited
- Best Pop Video: "Sure" by Take That
- Best Single: "Sure" by Take That
- Best Album: Parklife by Blur
- Best New Roadshow Act: Boyzone
- Most Fanciable Male Star: Mark Owen
- Most Fanciable Female Star: Pamela Anderson
- Best TV Programme: The O-Zone /Top of the Pops (joint winners)
- Best Person on Telly: Andi Peters
- Best Comedian: Jack Dee
- Best Radio DJ: Steve Wright
- Best Sports Star: Linford Christie
- Best Film: Speed
- Best Film Actor: Keanu Reeves
- Best Film Actress: Winona Ryder
- Best Haircut: Robbie Williams
- Best Dressed Person: Mark Owen
- Worst Person on Telly: Chris Evans
- Worst Male Singer: Sean Maguire
- Worst Female Singer: Kylie Minogue
- Least Fanciable Female Star: Madonna
- Worst Dressed Person: Madonna
- Sad Loser of 1994: John Major
- Worst Group: East 17
- Least Fanciable Male Star: Brian Harvey
- Worst TV Programme: Emmerdale
- Most Tragic Haircut: East 17

== 1995 awards ==
Andi Peters and Dani Behr were the hosts at London Arena on 3 December 1995.

- Best New Act: Boyzone
- Best British Group: Take That
- Best Group in the World: Take That
- Best Male Solo Singer: Michael Jackson
- Best Female Solo Singer: Mariah Carey
- Best Rock Act: Bon Jovi
- Best Indie-Type Band: Blur
- Best Dance/Soul Act: Eternal
- Best Pop Video: "Never Forget" by Take That
- Best Single: "Back for Good" by Take That
- Best Album: Nobody Else by Take That
- Best Album Cover: Nobody Else by Take That
- Most Fanciable Male Star: Mark Owen
- Most Fanciable Female Star: Louise
- Best TV Programme: Top of the Pops
- Best TV Actor: Robson Green
- Best TV Actress: Anna Friel
- Best TV Presenter: Andi Peters
- Best Comedian: Lee Evans
- Best Radio DJ: Chris Evans
- Best Sports Star: Eric Cantona
- Best Film: Batman Forever
- Best Film Actor: Tom Hanks
- Best Film Actress: Sandra Bullock
- Best Haircut: Mark Owen
- Best Dressed Person: Mark Owen
- Worst Group: Take That
- Worst Male Solo Singer: Michael Jackson
- Worst Female Solo Singer: Kylie Minogue
- Worst Single: Fairground by Simply Red
- Worst Film: Power Rangers
- Worst Film Actor: Hugh Grant
- Worst Film Actress: Sharon Stone
- Worst TV Actor: Sean Maguire
- Worst TV Actress: Pamela Anderson
- Worst TV Presenter: Zoe Ball
- Least Fanciable Female Star: Pamela Anderson
- Worst Dressed Person: Jarvis Cocker
- Least Fanciable Male Star: Jarvis Cocker
- Worst TV Programme: Emmerdale
- Most Tragic Haircut: Howard Donald
- Sad Loser of 1995: Robbie Williams

== 1996 awards ==
The 1996 Smash Hits Poll Winners Party ceremony was held on Sunday, 1 December 1996, at the London Arena. The party was broadcast on BBC1 at 3.30 pm. Ant & Dec and Lily Savage presented the show. The results for the 1996 Smash Hits Readers Poll were published in the 17 December 1996 issue of the magazine.

- Best Group: Spice Girls
- Best International Group: Boyzone
- Best Male Singer: Peter Andre
- Best Female Singer: Louise Redknapp
- Best Dance/Soul Act: Eternal
- Best Rock Outfit: Bon Jovi
- Best Indie Type Band: Oasis
- Our Price Best Single: "Words" by Boyzone
- Our Price Best Album Cover: Natural by Peter Andre
- Best Album: A Different Beat by Boyzone
- Best Pop Video: "Say You'll Be There" by Spice Girls
- Best Film: Independence Day
- Best Film Actor: Will Smith
- Best Film Actress: Sandra Bullock
- Best TV Programme: EastEnders
- Best Person on TV: Paul Nicholls
- Best Radio DJ: Neil Fox
- Best Dressed Person: Ronan Keating
- Best Haircut: Ronan Keating
- Best New Act: Spice Girls
- Funniest Person in the World: Robbie Williams
- Most Fanciable Person: Ronan Keating
- Best Sport Star '96: Jamie Redknapp
- Worst Group: Upside Down
- Worst Male Singer: Robbie Williams
- Worst Female Singer: Björk
- Worst Film: Barb Wire
- Worst Person in a Film: Pamela Anderson
- Worst TV Programme: Emmerdale
- Worst Person on TV: Chris Evans
- Most Tragic Haircut: Mark Owen
- Least Fanciable Person: Liam Gallagher
- Worst Dressed Person: Mark Owen
- Loser of '96: Robbie Williams

== 1997 awards ==
Ant & Dec and Jayne Middlemiss were the hosts at London Arena on 30 November 1997.

- Best International Band: Backstreet Boys
- Best British Group: Spice Girls
- Best New Act of '97: Hanson
- Sports Star of '97: David Beckham
- Best Male Singer: Kavana
- Best Female Singer: Louise Redknapp
- Best Album: Backstreet's Back by Backstreet Boys
- Best Video: "Everybody (Backstreet's Back)" by Backstreet Boys
- Best Single: "MMMBop" by Hanson
- Best Indie/Type Band: Oasis
- Best Dance/Soul Act: Eternal
- Best Album Cover: Backstreet's Back by Backstreet Boys
- Best Rock Outfit: Bon Jovi
- Best Dressed Female: Louise Redknapp
- Best Dressed Male: Ronan Keating
- Best Male Haircut: Nick Carter
- Most Fanciable Male: Taylor Hanson
- Most Fanciable Female: Louise Redknapp
- Hero/Heroine of 1997: Diana, Princess of Wales
- Best Radio DJ: Dr Fox
- Best TV Actor: Paul Nicholls
- Best TV Actress: Martine McCutcheon
- Best Comedian/Comedienne Winner: Lily Savage
- Best Film: Men in Black
- Best Film Actor: Will Smith
- Best Film Actress: Sandra Bullock
- Best Female Haircut: Jennifer Aniston
- Best TV Programme: Friends
- Worst TV Actor/Actress: Paul Nicholls
- Least Fanciable Male: Peter Andre
- Sad Loser of '97 Winner: Peter Andre
- Most Tragic Haircut of '97 Winner: Peter Andre
- Worst Single: "Spice Up Your Life" by Spice Girls
- Worst TV Presenter: Zoe Ball
- Worst Group: Spice Girls
- Worst Dressed Person: Geri Halliwell
- Least Fanciable Female: Geri Halliwell
- Worst TV Programme: Emmerdale
- Worst Female Singer: Björk
- Worst Male Singer: Mark Owen
- Worst Film: Bean
- Worst Film Actor/Actress: Pamela Anderson

== 1998 awards ==
Melanie Sykes, Stephen Gately, Meat Loaf and Will Smith were the hosts at London Arena on 13 December 1998.

- Best New Act: B*Witched
- Best New Tour Act: Westlife
- Princess of Pop: Billie
- Prince of Pop: Ronan Keating
- Best Dressed Man: Ronan Keating
- Most Fanciable Male: Ronan Keating
- Best Sports Star: Michael Owen
- Hero of 1998: Michael Owen
- Best Male Solo: Robbie Williams
- Best Female Solo: Billie
- Best Haircut: Scott Robinson
- Most Fanciable Female: Louise
- Best British Band: 5ive
- Best Album: 5ive by 5ive
- Best Film Actress: Kate Winslet
- Best Film: Titanic
- Best Boy Band: Westlife
- Best TV Actor: Adam Rickitt
- Best TV Programme: EastEnders
- Best TV Actress: Martine McCutcheon
- Best Band on Planet Pop: Boyzone

== 1999 awards ==
Steps were the hosts at London Arena on 5 December 1999.

- Best Band on Planet Pop '99: Backstreet Boys
- Best British Band: 5ive
- Best Non-British Band: Backstreet Boys
- Best Male Solo Star: Robbie Williams
- Best Female Solo Star: Britney Spears
- Best Single of '99: "I Want It That Way" by Backstreet Boys
- Best Album: Millennium by Backstreet Boys
- Best Video: "Larger than Life" by Backstreet Boys
- Best New Act: S Club 7
- Hero/Heroine of '99: Stephen Gately
- Most Fanciable Male on the Planet: Ronan Keating
- Most Fanciable Female on the Planet: Britney Spears
- Best Parent in Pop: Ronan Keating
- Best Dressed Male: Ronan Keating
- Best Dressed Female: Britney Spears
- Best Male Haircut: Scott Robinson
- Best Female Haircut: Britney Spears
- Best Dance/Soul Act: TLC
- Best Indie/Rock Act: Stereophonics
- Best Dance Choon: "Blue (Da Ba Dee)" by Eiffel 65
- Best Dancer in Pop: Britney Spears
- Best TV Actor: Jack Ryder
- Best TV Actress: Patsy Palmer
- Best TV Programme: EastEnders
- Best Film: Austin Powers 2
- Best Film Actor: Will Smith
- Best Film Actress: Julia Roberts
- Best DJ on the Radio: Dr Fox
- Sports Star of '99: Michael Owen
- Worst Group: Spice Girls
- Worst Male Singer: Adam Rickett
- Worst Female Singer: Melanie C
- Worst Single: "Goin' Down" by Melanie C
- Worst Album: My First Album by Lolly
- Worst Video: "Goin' Down" by Melanie C
- Worst Dressed Person: Melanie C
- Most Tragic Haircut: Melanie C
- Worst TV Actor: Adam Rickett
- Least Fanciable Person: Adam Rickett
- Worst TV Programme: Emmerdale
- Worst Film: Star Wars: Episode I – The Phantom Menace
- Worst Film Actor: Leonardo DiCaprio
- Worst Person on the Radio: Chris Evans
- Sad Loser of '99: Billie Piper

== 2000 awards ==
The hosts for this year were Katy Hill, Louise Redknapp and Richard Blackwood at London Arena on 10 December 2000. This was the last event shown on the BBC after 12 years.

- Best Band in Planet Pop 2000: Westlife
- Best British Band: Five
- Best Non-British Band: Westlife
- Best Boyband in the Universe: Westlife
- Best Female Solo Star: Britney Spears
- Best Rapper: Eminem
- Best New Male Solo Star: Craig David
- Best New Female Solo Star: Samantha Mumba
- Best New Band: Atomic Kitten
- Best Album: Coast to Coast by Westlife
- Best Single: "My Love" by Westlife
- Best Video: "Take On Me" by A1
- Best Male Solo Star: Ronan Keating
- Best Dancer in Pop: Britney Spears
- Best Dance Choon: "Kernkraft 400" by Zombie Nation
- Best Dressed Male: Ronan Keating
- Best Dressed Female: Britney Spears
- Best Haircut: Kian Egan
- Best DJ: Dr Fox
- Best Film: Billy Elliot
- Best Film Actor: Leonardo DiCaprio
- Best Film Actress: Julia Roberts
- Hero/Heroine of 2000: Steve Redgrave
- Best Sports Star of 2000: David Beckham
- Most Fanciable Male on the Planet: Shane Filan
- Most Fanciable Female on the Planet: Britney Spears

== 2001 awards ==
Vernon Kay, Margherita Taylor, Emma Bunton and Ritchie Neville were the hosts which took place at London Arena on 9 December 2001. This was the first one shown on Channel 4 and renamed Smash Hits T4 Poll Winners Party.

- Best Band - Westlife
- Best Newcomer - Blue
- Best Live Act - Steps
- Best Male Solo - Shaggy
- Best Female Solo - Britney Spears
- Best R&B Act - Destiny's Child
- Woolworths Best Single - "Whole Again" by Atomic Kitten
- Woolworths Best Album - World of Our Own by Westlife
- Most Fanciable Male - Ben Adams
- Most Fanciable Female - Rachel Stevens
- Best Male Haircut - Nicky Byrne
- Best Female Haircut - Faye Tozer
- Top TV Programme of the Year - EastEnders
- Best Music Video - "Clint Eastwood" by Gorillaz
- Best Sports Star - David Beckham
- Best TV Actor - Jack Ryder
- Best Radio DJ - Sara Cox
- Best New Tour Act - 3SL
- Hall of Fame - Steps

== 2002 awards ==
Vernon Kay hosted again but this time he was joined by June Sarpong and Kelly Osbourne who had to leave midway through the awards.

- Best Band on Planet Pop - Westlife
- Best UK Band - Blue
- Best International Act - Westlife
- Woolworths Best Newcomer on Planet Pop - Gareth Gates
- Best Live Act - Blue
- Best Male Solo - Gareth Gates
- Best Female Solo - Pink
- Best Dance Act - Lasgo
- Best Rock Act - The Calling
- Best R&B/Garage Act - So Solid Crew
- Woolworths Best Single - "Just a Little" by Liberty X
- Best Album - Angels with Dirty Faces by Sugababes
- Most Fanciable Male - Gareth Gates
- Most Fanciable Female - Holly Valance
- Party Mentalist of the Year - Brian McFadden
- Mouth Almighty of the Year - Jade Goody
- Top of Mop Award - Gareth Gates
- Flop Mop Award - Christina Aguilera
- Best Dressed Male in Pop - Darius
- Best Dressed Female in Pop - Liz McClarnon
- Worst Dressed Person in Pop - Christina Aguilera
- Top TV Programme of the Year - EastEnders
- Top Movie of the Year - Austin Powers in Goldmember
- Most Evil Man in Pop - Simon Cowell
- Most Hideous (The Most Minging Thing Ever) - Jade Goody
- Smash Hits Cover of the Year - Westlife
- Top Pop Pair Award - MC Harvey and Alesha Dixon
- Best Music Video - "Light My Fire" by Will Young
- Hall of Fame - Westlife

== 2003 awards ==
- Hall of Fame: Westlife
- Best Band in the World Ever: Busted
- Best British Band: Busted
- Stars of the Year: Busted
- Comeback King/Queen: Mark Owen
- Hot New Talent: Girls Aloud
- Best Male Solo Star: Gareth Gates
- Best Female Solo Star: Christina Aguilera
- Most Fanciable Male on the Planet: Justin Timberlake
- Most Fanciable Female on the Planet: Beyoncé
- Best Dressed Male: Duncan James
- Best Dressed Female: Rachel Stevens
- Best Urban Act: Big Brovaz
- Best Rock Act: Good Charlotte
- Best International Act: Westlife
- Best Dance Act: DJ Sammy
- Best Dancer in Pop: Justin Timberlake
- Best Single: "Sunshine" by Gareth Gates
- Best Album: Busted by Busted
- Best Music Video: "Crazy in Love" by Beyoncé
- Best Film: Pirates of the Caribbean
- TV Show of the Year: Pop Idol
- Worst single: "Fast Food Song" by Fast Food Rockers
- Top Pop Mop: Matt Willis
- Flop Pop Mop: Kelly Osbourne

== 2004 awards ==
The 2004 Smash Hits Poll Winners Party ceremony was held on Sunday, 21 November 2004, at the Wembley Arena.

- Hall of Fame: Kylie Minogue
- Star of the Year: McFly
- Best New Talent: Natasha Bedingfield
- Sporting Hero of the Year: Kelly Holmes
- Best UK Band: McFly
- Best Solo Artist: Usher
- Best Single: "Thunderbirds Are Go" by Busted
- Best Video: "That Girl" by McFly
- Best Album: Room on the 3rd Floor by McFly
- Best International Band: Maroon 5
- Best Rock Act: The Darkness
- Best Dance Act: Shapeshifters
- Best R&B Act: Usher
- Best Hip-Hop Act: Eminem
- Best Dressed Star: Rachel Stevens
- Best TV Show: EastEnders
- Best TV Personality: Shane Richie
- Best Film: Shrek 2
- Best Film Star: Orlando Bloom
- Favourite Ringtone: "Thunderbirds Are Go" by Busted
- Favourite Download: "Flying Without Wings" by Westlife
- Favourite New Guilty Pleasure: Two and a Half Men
- Most Fanciable Male on the Planet: Danny Jones
- Most Fanciable Female on the Planet: Rachel Stevens
- Top Pop Mop: Matt Willis
- Flop Pop Mop: Marilyn Manson
- Worst Dressed Star: Will Young

== 2005 awards ==
Hosts were Steve Jones and Miquita Oliver.

- Hall of Fame: Britney Spears
- Star of the Year: McFly
- Hot New Talent: Son of Dork
- Best Newcomer:
- Best UK Band: McFly
- Best Solo Artist: Lee Ryan
- Best Single: "All About You" by McFly
- Best Album: Wonderland by McFly
- Best International Band: Green Day
- Best Rock Act: Green Day
- Best Dance Act: Uniting Nations
- Best R'n'B Act: Akon
- Best Hip Hop Act: Eminem
- Best Video: "Don't Cha" by Pussycat Dolls
- Party Animal of the Year: Charlotte Church
- Favourite Ringtone: Crazy Frog
- Hottest Showbiz Couple: Cheryl Tweedy and Ashley Cole
- Sh! Style Icon: Gwen Stefani
- Best TV Show: EastEnders
- TV Star of the Year: The X Factor judges - Simon/Louis/Sharon
- Best Movie: Charlie and the Chocolate Factory
- Movie Star of the Year: Johnny Depp
- Best Sports Star: David Beckham
- Most Fanciable Female: Rachel Stevens
- Most Snoggable Male: Danny Jones
- Best Dressed Star: Kylie Minogue
- Worst Dressed Star: Britney Spears
- Top Mop (Best Hair): Dougie Poynter
- Flop Mop (Worst Hair): Peter Andre
