= Patty Dann =

American novelist and nonfiction writer

- Born: October 30, 1953 (age 72); New York City, U.S.
- Education: University of Oregon (BA); Columbia University (MFA)
- Occupation: Writer
- Spouses: Willem Nooter (m. 1991; died 2000) Michael Hill (m. 2008)
- Children: 1

Patty Dann (born October 30, 1953) is an American novelist and nonfiction writer. She studied at the University of Oregon, and later earned an MFA in writing from Columbia University. While working at the A&E network in 1986, she revised Mermaids, a coming-of-age novel she had written as her master's thesis, which was subsequently published by Ticknor and Fields. It was later made into a feature film of the same name in 1990.

Dann is also the author of the novels The Wright Sister (2020), Sweet & Crazy (2003), and Starfish (2013), the latter of which is a sequel to Mermaids. She has also written nonfiction works, including The Butterfly Hours: Transforming Memories into Memoir, The Baby Boat: A Memoir of Adoption (1998), focusing on the adoption of her son, and The Goldfish Went on Vacation: A Memoir of Loss (2007), which reflected on the death of her husband.

== Early life and education ==
Dann was born on October 30, 1953, in New York City to Joanne (née Himmell) and Michael Dann, a comedy writer-turned-television executive at NBC and CBS. She has one brother, Jonathan, and a sister, Priscilla. Dann was raised in Chappaqua, New York.

After graduating high school, Dann enrolled at Bennington College, but left after her freshman year, transferring to the University of Oregon, where she earned a Bachelor of Arts degree in art history. While attending the University of Oregon, she studied under writer Ralph Salisbury, whom she later cited as a major influence on her writing. She subsequently earned an MFA in writing at Columbia University, where she submitted an early draft of Mermaids, a coming-of-age novel about a teenage girl in the 1960s, as her master's thesis.

Dann has published four novels: The Wright Sister (a historical novel about the Wright Brothers' sister Katharine Wright), Mermaids, Starfish, and Sweet & Crazy. Her work has been translated into French, German, Italian, Portuguese, Dutch, Chinese, Korean and Japanese.

Mermaids was made into a movie, starring Cher, Winona Ryder and Christina Ricci. The Butterfly Hours was chosen as one of the "Best Books for Writers" by Poets & Writers Magazine. The Goldfish Went on Vacation: A Memoir of Loss received a Foreword Indie Gold Award for Family & Relationships.

Dann's articles have appeared in The New York Times, Boston Globe, Chicago Tribune, Philadelphia Inquirer, Christian Science Monitor, O Magazine, Oregon Quarterly, Redbook, More, Forbes Woman, Poets & Writers Magazine, The Writers' Handbook Dirt: The Quirks, Habits and Passions of Keeping House, and This I Believe: On Motherhood.

She has taught at the Sarah Lawrence Writing Institute, the Fairfield County Writers' Studio and the West Side YMCA in NYC.

Dann is married to journalist Michael Hill, and has one son and two stepsons.

== Bibliography ==
=== Fiction ===
- Mermaids (1986), Ticknor and Fields
- Sweet & Crazy (2008), St. Martin's Press
- Starfish (2013), Greenpoint Press
- The Wright Sister: A Novel (2020), Harper Perennial

=== Nonfiction ===
- The Baby Boat: A Memoir of Adoption (1998), Hyperion
- The Goldfish Went on Vacation: A Memoir of Loss (2007), Trumpeter
- The Butterfly Hours: Transforming Memories into Memoir (2016), Shambhala
