= The Last Word (2008 film) =

- Theatrical release poster
- Directed by: Geoffrey Haley
- Written by: Geoffrey Haley
- Produced by: David Hillary; Alexandra Milchan; Timothy Wayne Peternel; Bonnie Timmermann; Jack Utsick
- Starring: Winona Ryder; Wes Bentley; Ray Romano
- Cinematography: Kees Van Oostrum
- Music by: John Swihart
- Production companies: Deviant Films; Dreamz
- Distributed by: Image Entertainment
- Release dates: January 19, 2008 (Sundance); April 21, 2009 (United States)
- Country: United States
- Language: English

The Last Word is a romantic comedy-drama film written and directed by Geoffrey Haley. It stars Winona Ryder and Wes Bentley. It had its world premiere at the Sundance Film Festival in January 2008 and was released on DVD on April 21, 2009.

== Plot ==
Evan Merck, an odd but gifted poet, makes his living writing suicide notes for the soon-to-be departed. At the funeral for a client, he meets Charlotte, the free-spirited sister of the deceased. When Charlotte asks how Evan knew her brother, he lies and says he was an old college friend. Evan's evasiveness only sparks Charlotte's curiosity and she romantically pursues him. Evans finds himself falling for her but cannot bring himself to reveal his true profession. Meanwhile, Evan must deal with Abel, a sarcastic new client and music composer whose career has been reduced to making jingles for phone messages.

== Cast ==
- Winona Ryder as Charlotte Morris
- Wes Bentley as Evan
- Ray Romano as Abel
- Gina Hecht as Hilde Morris
- A. J. Trauth as Greg
- John Billingsley as Brady
- Kurt Caceres as Sammy
- Michael Cornacchia as Client

== Critical reception ==
Reviews criticized the romantic subplot and the film's underdeveloped characters. James Greensberg of the Associated Press commented "the film pushes the eccentric without creating believable characters". Writing for DVD Talk, David Cornelius wrote, "Surely there's something fascinating boiling below Evan's quiet surface, right? Surely he has a rich backstory that has led him to this career. And surely his time spent with Abel will lead to quirky, intelligent discussions on life and death and art. Surely we will be treated to deep thoughts on solitude in the big city, the defeat of one's dreams, dealing with mental illness, finding happiness hidden in the corners of life. But no."

Amanda Mae Meyncke of Film.com noted that while the film "wins overall points for originality" and "there are some moments of dark comedy...it’s hard to find sympathy with a character who insists on helping people end their lives. The film’s ending may come as a surprise to some, a sickly sweet nothing that leaves you feeling empty."

Though reviews were mixed, multiple critics singled out Romano's performance, with Cornelius saying "It's [Abel], not Charlotte, that really brightens Evan's life, providing friendship when both had none. When focused on these two, The Last Word becomes a sly dark comedy that works."
