= Mermaids (1990 film) =

1990 film by Richard Benjamin

- Theatrical release poster
- Directed by: Richard Benjamin
- Written by: June Roberts
- Based on: Mermaids by Patty Dann
- Produced by: Lauren Lloyd; Wallis Nicita; Patrick J. Palmer; Suzanne Rothbaum
- Starring: Cher; Bob Hoskins; Winona Ryder; Michael Schoeffling; Christina Ricci
- Cinematography: Howard Atherton
- Edited by: Jacqueline Cambas
- Music by: Jack Nitzsche
- Distributed by: Orion Pictures
- Release date: December 14, 1990
- Running time: 110 minutes
- Country: United States
- Language: English
- Budget: $20 million
- Box office: $35.4 million

Mermaids is a 1990 American family comedy-drama film directed by Richard Benjamin, and starring Cher, Bob Hoskins, Winona Ryder, Michael Schoeffling, and Christina Ricci in her film debut. Based on Patty Dann's 1986 novel of the same name, and set in 1963, its plot follows a neurotic teenage girl who moves with her wayward mother and younger sister to a small town in Massachusetts.

Originally planned as the English-language debut of Swedish director Lasse Hallström, the film was ultimately directed by Benjamin after both Hallström and Frank Oz abandoned the project. Filming took place in various locations in Massachusetts in the fall of 1989.

Released in December 1990, the film was met with mostly positive reviews, with acclaim towards the performance of Ryder, who received a Golden Globe Award nomination and a National Board of Review Award. Ricci also won a Young Artist Award for her performance.

== Plot ==
In 1963 Oklahoma, Charlotte Flax is a 15-year-old whose carefree 31-year-old single mother, Rachel, relocates her and her 9-year-old sister, Kate, each time she ends a relationship. Rachel's parenting approach—which more resembles friendship than mothering—troubles the anxiety-ridden Charlotte, who is embarrassed by her flamboyant nature.

After ending an affair with her married employer, Rachel takes Charlotte and Kate to the small town of Eastport, Massachusetts where she gets a job as a lawyer's receptionist. Charlotte is ecstatic about their new home's location, as it borders a convent, and she is obsessed with Catholicism, to the annoyance of irreligious, Jewish Rachel.

Charlotte soon becomes enamored of Joe Peretti, the 26-year-old driver of her school-bus, who doubles as caretaker of the convent. Meanwhile, Rachel meets local shoe store owner Lou Landsky, and gradually begins a relationship with him. After the assassination of John F. Kennedy, Charlotte finds Joe ringing the convent bell and consoles him. However, as they begin to kiss, she feels filled with sin and flees. After the encounter, she begins fasting to purge her sinful thoughts, eventually passing out from hunger.

Uneducated about sex, Charlotte fears that God will punish her with pregnancy via Immaculate Conception and decides to steal Rachel's car and run away. She drives all night before stopping at the home of a young family in New Haven, Connecticut, claiming to have suffered car trouble when she runs out of gas.

The family invites her to have breakfast with them, but Lou arrives to retrieve her during the meal, having tracked her after reporting the car stolen. Rachel chastises her when she returns home, but she doesn't reveal why she ran away. The next day, she makes an appointment with a local obstetrician under the name Joan Arc. He tells her it isn't possible for her to be pregnant as she is a virgin.

At a New Year's Eve costume party, Lou asks Rachel to marry and move in with him, but she declines, reminding him he is still legally married to his wife (who had left him before they met). After the party, she discovers her car will not start and Joe gives her a ride home. Upon arriving home, she kisses him, wishing him a happy New Year.

Charlotte observes the kiss and accuses Rachel of trying to thwart her budding relationship. She asks Joe why he would kiss Rachel, but he drives off. On New Year's Day, with Rachel out for the day with Lou, Charlotte stays home with Kate and dresses up in Rachel's clothes and makeup. She drinks some wine and offers some to Kate, who drinks a large amount without her knowing. She takes Kate to see the convent, and she—not knowing Kate is drunk—goes to the top of the bell tower, leaving Kate behind to collect rocks near the river. She finds Joe in the bell tower, and they embrace and start to have sex. An unattended Kate falls in the river and nearly drowns, but is rescued by the nuns.

While Kate recovers in the hospital, a crazed and angry Rachel gets into an argument with Charlotte about being irresponsible and threatens to move them to another town. The argument ends after Rachel slaps Charlotte across the face, and they subsequently have a calm, heartfelt conversation. ("You know...You're just one year younger than I was when I gave birth to you.") Discussing her father, Charlotte realizes he is never coming back. Rachel ultimately agrees to her plea to stay in Eastport for at least one more year.

Over the course of the following year, Rachel and Lou continue their relationship, while Joe relocates to California to open a plant nursery; he and Charlotte keep in contact via postcards. At school, she has gained a new reputation due to her sexual encounter with Joe and replaces her obsession of Catholicism with Greek mythology. Kate has recovered and has returned to competitive swimming, although the accident has left her hearing "sounding fuzzy" sometimes.

The film ends with Rachel, Charlotte, and Kate playfully dancing as they set the table for a family meal, which was something they hadn't done in the past.

== Cast ==
- Cher as Rachel Flax / Mrs. Flax
- Bob Hoskins as Louis "Lou" Landsky
- Winona Ryder as Charlotte Flax
- Michael Schoeffling as Joseph "Joe" Peretti
- Christina Ricci as Kate Flax
- Caroline McWilliams as Carrie
- Jan Miner as Mother Superior
- Betsy Townsend as Mary O'Brien
- Richard McElvain as Mr. Crain
- Paula Plum as Mrs. Crain

== Production ==
=== Development ===
Producers initially engaged Swedish director Lasse Hallström to direct the film as his English-language feature debut, but he left the project to direct Once Around (1991). They subsequently hired Frank Oz as a replacement, but he also abandoned the project after clashing with Cher and Winona Ryder. Ultimately, they hired Richard Benjamin to direct the film.

Producer Patrick Palmer commented that both Hallström and Oz had envisioned a darker tone for the film, and that at one point, Hallström's version of the film included Charlotte committing suicide.

=== Casting ===
Emily Lloyd was originally cast in the part of Charlotte Flax. She had begun shooting the film when Cher complained that she did not look enough like Charlotte to play her. Winona Ryder, who impressed both Cher and then-director Oz in Heathers (1988), was subsequently cast in the part. Lloyd sued Orion Pictures Corporation and Mermaid Productions for breach of contract and received US$175,000 in damages, reaching a settlement on the second day of the trial, 30 July 1991.

=== Filming ===
Principal photography of the film began September 25, 1989 in Massachusetts, and completed on December 15 of that year. The Flax house exterior was built for the film in Coolidge Point near Manchester-by-the-Sea and downtown Rockport served as the fictional village of Eastport. In a rural area near North Easton, the production crew built a 60-foot (18 m) bell tower for the convent set as well as a cottage. Some interior photography was completed on a soundstage constructed in a warehouse in Malden. The competitive swimming scene that opens the film was filmed at the War Memorial Pool in Cambridge. The majority of the film was shot in Massachusetts, and some additional photography occurred in Rhode Island and New Hampshire.

== Release ==
=== Critical response ===
On Rotten Tomatoes the film has a rating of 71% based on reviews from 24 critics. On Metacritic it has a score of 56% based on reviews from 20 critics, indicating "mixed or average reviews". Audiences surveyed by CinemaScore gave the film a grade "B" on scale of A to F.

Though the film's coming-of-age story was seen as a somewhat familiar one, many critics argued the film was elevated by its performances—particularly Ryder's—and a script imbued with "a quality of everyday surrealism". Hal Hinson of The Washington Post thought the "comedy springs out of the incongruous pairing of a rebellious, crazy mom and a devoutly conservative daughter—that and the nuttiness of having a Jewish girl obsessed with Catholicism." He wrote, "What's great about Mermaids is how easily it keys us into Charlotte's hilariously warped teenage thought-waves…Having made something of a specialty of woe-is-me, adolescent angst, Ryder finds a deeper level here, a level of comedy with something genuinely painful mixed in."

Vincent Canby of The New York Times wrote. "Mermaids, adapted by the English writer June Roberts from the novel by Patty Dann, is a terribly gentle if wisecracking comedy about the serious business of growing up." Dave Kehr of the Chicago Tribune enjoyed the "ominous literary dialogue, a few hints at dark undertones and a number of complicated, not-quite-clear metaphors." He wrote, "It's hard to watch [it] without thinking of the beautiful, mysterious and genuinely disturbing film Bill Forsyth made out of the very similar material of Marilynne Robinson's novel Housekeeping." However, Kehr liked the "cuddly sitcom sentimentality." Roger Ebert of the Chicago Sun-Times gave it 3 out of 4 stars: "[It's] not exactly good, but it is not boring. Winona Ryder, in another of her alienated outsider roles, generates real charisma. And what the movie is saying about Cher is as elusive as it is intriguing."

In a negative review, Time Out New York wrote: "The film is burdened by curious details and observations, and its preoccupation with all things aquatic (little sister is an ace swimmer, Mom dresses up as a mermaid for New Year's Eve, etc.) is overworked. Characterization suffers, with Charlotte and Rachel too self-absorbed to engage our sympathies. Crucially, they just aren't funny".

==== Accolades ====
Awards for Mermaids
| Institution | Category | Recipient(s) | Result |
|---|---|---|---|
| Golden Globe Awards | Best Supporting Actress – Motion Picture | Winona Ryder | Nominated |
| National Board of Review | Best Supporting Actress | Winona Ryder | Won |
| Young Artist Awards | Best Supporting Actress – Motion Picture | Christina Ricci | Won |

=== Home media ===
Mermaids was released on VHS on May 23, 1991, by Orion Home Video. It was successful in the video rental market, becoming the 26th most-rented video in the United States for 1991.
