= Little Women (1994 film) =

1994 film by Gillian Armstrong

- Theatrical release poster
- Directed by: Gillian Armstrong
- Screenplay by: Robin Swicord
- Based on: Little Women; 1868 novel by Louisa May Alcott
- Produced by: Denise Di Novi
- Starring: Winona Ryder; Gabriel Byrne; Trini Alvarado; Samantha Mathis; Kirsten Dunst; Claire Danes; Christian Bale; Eric Stoltz; John Neville; Mary Wickes; Susan Sarandon
- Cinematography: Geoffrey Simpson
- Edited by: Nicholas Beauman
- Music by: Thomas Newman
- Production companies: Columbia Pictures; Di Novi Pictures
- Distributed by: Sony Pictures Releasing
- Release date: December 25, 1994 (United States)
- Running time: 119 minutes
- Country: United States
- Language: English
- Budget: $15–18 million
- Box office: $95 million

Little Women is a 1994 American coming-of-age historical drama film directed by Gillian Armstrong. The screenplay by Robin Swicord is based on Louisa May Alcott's 1868–69 two-volume novel of the same title, the fifth feature film adaptation of the classic story. After a limited release on December 25, 1994, it was released nationwide four days later by Columbia Pictures.

It received critical acclaim and grossed $95 million worldwide. It received three Academy Award nominations for Best Actress (Ryder), Best Costume Design, and Best Original Score. It was followed by a loose sequel, Little Men.

== Plot ==
The March sisters—responsible Meg, tempestuous Jo, tender Beth, and romantic Amy—are growing up in Concord, Massachusetts during and after the American Civil War. Their father is away serving as a chaplain in the war and, with their strong-willed mother, Marmee, they struggle with major and minor problems in 19th-century New England. The girls revel in performing Jo's romantic plays in their attic theater.

Next-door neighbor, wealthy Mr. Laurence's grandson, Theodore ("Laurie"), moves in, becoming a close friend of the Marches, particularly Jo. Mr. Laurence mentors Beth, whose exquisite piano-playing reminds him of his deceased daughter, and Meg falls in love with Laurie's tutor, John Brooke.

When Mr. March is wounded, Jo sells her hair so Marmee can go by train to nurse him back to health. While she is away, Beth continues visiting a struggling immigrant family, providing food and firewood. She contracts scarlet fever from the youngest child. Awaiting Marmee's return, Meg and Jo, who both previously survived scarlet fever, decide to send Amy away to live safely with their Aunt March. Amy laments to Laurie that she may die without ever being kissed. He promises to kiss her before she dies if she becomes ill.

Prior to Beth's illness, Jo had been Aunt March's companion for several years, and although she didn't enjoy it, she hoped she would take her to Europe. Beth gets worse, so Marmee returns home, nursing her to recovery in time for Christmas, but the illness weakens her. Mr. Laurence gives his daughter's piano to Beth, Meg accepts John Brooke's proposal and Mr. March surprises them, returning home from the war.

Four years pass; a now twenty years old Meg and John marry. Graduating from college, Laurie proposes to nineteen year old Jo and asks her to go to London with him but, seeing him more as a brother than a lover, she refuses. Jo is disappointed when Aunt March decides to take seventeen-year-old Amy with her to Europe instead of her. She has been Aunt March's companion and wishes to further her artistic training in Europe. Crushed, Jo departs for New York City to pursue writing and experience life. There she meets Friedrich Bhaer, a German professor who challenges and stimulates her intellectually, introducing her to opera and philosophy, and encouraging her to write better stories than the lurid Victorian melodramas she has penned so far.

In Europe, Amy is reunited with Laurie. Disappointed to find he has become dissolute and irresponsible; she scolds him for pursuing her merely to become part of the March family. In return, he bitterly rebukes her for courting one of his wealthy college friends to marry into money. He asks Amy to wait for him in a letter while he works in London for his grandfather and makes himself worthy.

Jo is called home for Beth, who finally dies of the after-effects of scarlet fever. A saddened Jo retreats to the comfort of the attic, writing her life story. Upon its completion, she sends it to Professor Bhaer. Meanwhile, Meg has twins Demi and Daisy.

A letter from Amy tells them Aunt March is too ill to travel, so Amy must remain in Europe with her. In London, Laurie receives a letter from Jo about Beth's death, saying Amy is in Vevey, Switzerland, unable to come home. He immediately goes to be at Amy's side. They finally return to the March home as spouses, to Jo's surprise and eventual delight.

Aunt March dies, leaving Jo her house. She turns it into a school. Professor Bhaer arrives with the printed galley proofs of her manuscript but, believing Jo is married, he departs to catch a train to the West, to accept a professorship. Jo runs after him, explaining the misunderstanding. She begs him not to go. He then proposes to her, and she happily accepts.

== Cast ==
- Winona Ryder as Josephine "Jo" March, an ambitious young woman, who longs to become a successful author.
- Gabriel Byrne as Friedrich Bhaer, an older professor who falls in love with Jo while he works as a tutor in New York and eventually marries her.
- Trini Alvarado as Margaret "Meg" March, the oldest March sister. She marries Laurie's tutor, John Brooke, and gives birth to fraternal twins: a boy, John (nicknamed "Demijohn" by Jo, which is shortened to "Demi"); and a girl, Margaret, called "Daisy" at home "so as to not have two Megs".
- Samantha Mathis and Kirsten Dunst as Amy March, the youngest March child and quick-witted daughter. Instead of the brown hair and brown or green eyes of her three older sisters, she has golden curls and blue eyes. She later marries Laurie and becomes a successful painter. Amy was the only character played by two different actresses – Dunst portrayed her at twelve years old in the first half of the movie, Mathis as a seventeen-year-old in the second half of the movie.
- Claire Danes as Elizabeth "Beth" March, the third March daughter and the pianist of the family. She is shy, good, sweet, kindly, and loyal. At the young age of fourteen, she contracted scarlet fever, which weakened her heart and resulted in her death four years later at the age of eighteen.
- Christian Bale as Theodore "Laurie" Laurence, the young neighbor who becomes Jo's best friend in their youth. Later, he tries, but fails, to convince her to marry him. He eventually falls in love with and marries Amy.
- Eric Stoltz as John Brooke, Laurie's tutor and Meg's eventual husband.
- John Neville as Mr. James Laurence, Laurie's grandfather and a kind neighbor of the Marches.
- Mary Wickes as Aunt Josephine March, the only March family member who still has a lot of money. Upon her death, her estate is left to adult Jo, who transforms it into a school for boys.
- Susan Sarandon as Abigail "Marmee" March, the mother of the March daughters and the loving wife of Mr. March.
- Matthew Walker as Robert March, the father of the four March daughters, Marmee's loving husband, and long-time devoted spouse.
- Florence Paterson as Hannah Mullet, the loyal housekeeper of the March family since Meg was born. The girls think of her more as a good friend than a servant.
- Janne Mortil as Sally Moffat, Meg's one and only good friend, who is quite rich and prosperous.
- Donal Logue as Jacob Mayer

== Production ==
It took Little Women 12 years to find a studio. According to writer Robin Swicord and producer Denise Di Novi, "people just weren't interested in a movie with a lot of women". One executive suggested a modern adaptation, with "the Marches...in the 90s and not happy about not having a car for Christmas". Di Novi said that films like Little Women were dismissively referred to in the film industry as "needle in the eye" pictures, "where a guy would say to his wife, "I'd rather have a needle in the eye than go to that movie'". These films were assumed to have no appeal for male audiences and thus deemed not worth the risk of production. Eventually, Columbia agreed to consider the project under the condition that Winona Ryder was to play Jo.

Originally, Gillian Armstrong wasn't on board with directing Little Women. She rejected the offer several times due to the similarities between Little Women and her previous film, My Brilliant Career. However, with persuasion from Di Novi and Amy Pascal, Armstrong came to realize that the two films were different after all. With the help of screenwriter Robin Swicord, they aimed to portray more mature themes than those of the previous adaptations, including family, growing up, and progressive feminism. During pre-production, Armstrong decided not to look to the previous films for inspiration, choosing instead to stay true to the novel.

=== Casting ===
Along with Winona Ryder, already signed on to play Jo, offers for the roles of Marmee and Laurie were sent out to Susan Sarandon and Christian Bale. Sarandon almost turned down the role because "... it was towards the end of the school year, and I had a pretty strict policy about not leaving my young kids".

The part of Amy was the most difficult casting decision to be made. This adaptation was the first and only to have two different actresses play Amy over the course of the film. According to producer Di Novi, there was something "weird" about having one actress playing first a child and then an adult: "It just didn't work."

Among those to read for the role of Amy were the then-unknown Natalie Portman, and Thora Birch, who had already filmed Hocus Pocus and Patriot Games. In the end, Kirsten Dunst was chosen. Armstrong mentioned in a 2019 interview that "Kirsten Dunst really blew [other young Amy candidates] out of the water". The role of the older Amy was a close decision between Reese Witherspoon and Samantha Mathis. Armstrong's first pick, if the production had decided on casting only one actress to play Amy, was Witherspoon. However, casting director Carrie Frazier settled on Mathis for the part.

The initial candidate to play Bhaer, for Di Novi, was Hugh Grant, commenting "we all had a huge crush on [him]". However, Frazier was not on board with the idea, claiming that the option was a bit "off the rails". Grant was ultimately deemed too young and confident to play the Bhaer of the book that Frazier, Di Novi, and Armstrong wanted. John Turturro also lobbied persistently for the role, but Frazier wanted a deeper and more poetic Bhaer, and decided on Gabriel Byrne.

=== Filming ===
The 1994 adaptation of Little Women was filmed primarily in parts of Canada, such as Vancouver Island and Vancouver, both in the province of British Columbia. However, certain scenes were shot in the United States, specifically Massachusetts. Gillian Armstrong was adamant about creating a look that remained faithful to Little Women's time period. The overall aesthetic for the film was heavily influenced by photographs, paintings, and drawings from the Civil War era, the period when the novel Little Women was written. Armstrong, cinematographer Geoffrey Simpson, art director Jan Roelfs, and costume designer Colleen Atwood sought inspiration from artworks of the era for the sets, costumes, color coordination, and even camera lighting.

The film is dedicated to murder victim Polly Klaas and literary agent Judy Scott-Fox.

== Reception ==
=== Critical reception ===
Little Women was well received by film critics upon release. On Rotten Tomatoes, 92% of 100 reviews were positive, with an average rating of 7.7/10. The site's critics consensus reads, "Thanks to a powerhouse lineup of talented actresses, Gillian Armstrong's take on Louisa May Alcott's Little Women proves that a timeless story can succeed no matter how many times it's told." On Metacritic, the film has a weighted average score of 87 out of 100 based on 23 critics, indicating "universal acclaim". Audiences polled by CinemaScore gave the film a grade of "A" on an A+ to F scale. Ratings were positive across all ages and groups, with the lowest being an A-minus grade from men.

Roger Ebert of the Chicago Sun-Times awarded the film 3 1/2 stars, calling it "a surprisingly sharp and intelligent telling of Louisa May Alcott's famous story, and not the soft-edged children's movie it might appear." He added, "[It] grew on me. At first, I was grumpy, thinking it was going to be too sweet and devout. Gradually, I saw that Gillian Armstrong [...] was taking it seriously. And then I began to appreciate the ensemble acting, with the five actresses creating the warmth and familiarity of a real family."

Edward Guthmann of the San Francisco Chronicle called the film "meticulously crafted and warmly acted" and observed it "is one of the rare Hollywood studio films that invites your attention, slowly and elegantly, rather than propelling your interest with effects and easy manipulation."

=== Box office ===
The film opened on 1,503 screens in the US and Canada on December 21, 1994. It grossed $5.3 million and ranked number 6 at the box office on its opening weekend and eventually grossed $50.1 million in the United States and Canada. Internationally, it grossed $45 million for a worldwide total of $95 million, against a production budget of $15–18 million.

=== Accolades ===
Award	Category	Nominee(s)	Result	Ref.
Academy Awards	Best Actress	Winona Ryder	Nominated	
Academy Awards	Best Costume Design	Colleen Atwood	Nominated	
Academy Awards	Best Original Score	Thomas Newman	Nominated	
Artios Awards	Outstanding Achievement in Feature Film Casting – Drama	Carrie Frazier and Shani Ginsberg	Nominated	
BMI Film & TV Awards	Film Music Award	Thomas Newman	Won	
Boston Society of Film Critics Awards	Best Supporting Actress	Kirsten Dunst	Won	
British Academy Film Awards	Best Costume Design	Colleen Atwood	Nominated	
Chicago Film Critics Association Awards	Best Actress	Winona Ryder	Nominated	
Chicago Film Critics Association Awards	Best Supporting Actress	Claire Danes	Nominated	
Chicago Film Critics Association Awards	Most Promising Actress	Claire Danes	Nominated	
Chicago Film Critics Association Awards	Most Promising Actress	Kirsten Dunst	Won	
Chlotrudis Awards	Best Movie		Nominated	
Chlotrudis Awards	Best Actress	Winona Ryder	Nominated	
Chlotrudis Awards	Best Supporting Actress	Kirsten Dunst	Nominated	
Dallas–Fort Worth Film Critics Association Awards	Best Picture		Nominated	
Kansas City Film Critics Circle Awards	Best Actress	Winona Ryder	Won	
Movieguide Awards	Best Movie for Families		Won	
Satellite Awards	Best Classic DVD		Nominated	
USC Scripter Awards		Robin Swicord (screenwriter); Louisa May Alcott (author)	Nominated	
Writers Guild of America Awards	Best Screenplay – Based on Material Previously Produced or Published	Robin Swicord	Nominated	
Young Artist Awards	Best Family Motion Picture – Drama		Nominated	
Young Artist Awards	Best Performance by a Youth Actress Co-Starring in a Motion Picture	Claire Danes	Nominated	
Young Artist Awards	Best Performance by a Youth Actress Co-Starring in a Motion Picture	Kirsten Dunst	Won	

=== Year-end lists ===
- 2nd – Mack Bates, The Milwaukee Journal
- 3rd – Michael MacCambridge, Austin American-Statesman
- 5th – Sean P. Means, The Salt Lake Tribune
- 5th – Dan Craft, The Pantagraph
- 6th – Yardena Arar, Los Angeles Daily News
- 8th – Scott Schuldt, The Oklahoman
- 9th – Kevin Thomas, Los Angeles Times
- 10th – Gene Siskel, The Chicago Tribune
- Top 9 (not ranked) – Dan Webster, The Spokesman-Review
- Top 10 (listed alphabetically, not ranked) – Mike Clark, USA Today
- Top 10 (listed alphabetically, not ranked) – Matt Zoller Seitz, Dallas Observer
- Top 10 (listed alphabetically, not ranked) – Bob Ross, The Tampa Tribune
- Top 10 runners-up (not ranked) – Janet Maslin, The New York Times
- Best of the year (not ranked) – Michael Medved, Sneak Previews
- Honorable mention – William Arnold, Seattle Post-Intelligencer
- Honorable mention – David Elliott, The San Diego Union-Tribune
- Honorable mention – Michael Mills, The Palm Beach Post

== Home media ==
The film had its initial North American video release on VHS on June 20, 1995. It was released on DVD on April 25, 2000. It was later given a Blu-ray release three times, including a manufacture-on-demand version from Sony which was released on December 13, 2016, and again on March 24, 2020. The 2016 release was a part of the Sony Choice Collection. On October 29, 2019, Mill Creek Entertainment released Little Women in a double feature Blu-ray edition alongside Kirsten Dunst's fellow film Marie Antoinette. On November 19, 2024, the film was released on 4K U.H.D.

== Novelization ==
In 1994 Pocket Books published a film tie-in novel, Little Women, by Laurie Lawlor, which was based on the film screenplay by Robin Swicord, and not on the original Louisa May Alcott novel.

== See also ==
- Second weekend in box office performance § Second-weekend increase
- Little Women (1917 film)
- Little Women (1918 film)
- Little Women (1933 film)
- Little Women (1949 film)
- Little Women (2018 film)
- Little Women (2019 film)
