= Gambler (song) =

1985 single by Madonna

Single by Madonna

from the album Vision Quest
- B-side: "Nature of the Beach" (Black 'n Blue)
- Released: October 3, 1985
- Recorded: November 1983
- Genre: Dance-pop
- Length: 3:54
- Label: Geffen; CBS
- Songwriter: Madonna
- Producer: John "Jellybean" Benitez

Madonna singles chronology
"Dress You Up" (1985)	"Gambler" (1985)	"Live to Tell" (1986)

Music video
- "Gambler" on YouTube

"Gambler" is a song by American singer Madonna from the soundtrack of the 1985 film Vision Quest, in which she appears as a nightclub singer. Written by Madonna and produced by John "Jellybean" Benitez, it originated from an earlier demo titled "Ambushed". An uptempo dance-pop and synth-disco song with rock influences, it features prominent synthesizers, a guitar riff, and lyrics about independence and self-determination. Due to a dispute between Geffen Records and Madonna's label, Warner Bros. Records, "Gambler" was released only outside the United States on October 3, 1985, as the soundtrack's second single, following "Crazy for You".

Upon release, "Gambler" received mixed reviews from critics, some of whom praised its energy while others found it unremarkable compared with Madonna's other work. Retrospective assessments have been more favorable, with several publications recognizing it as one of her more overlooked recordings. The single peaked at number four on the UK Singles Chart, helping Madonna equal the record for the most top-ten singles in a calendar year. It also reached the top ten in several European countries and Australia.

Its promotional music video combined footage of Madonna performing the song with scenes from Vision Quest. Madonna performed "Gambler" live only during the Virgin Tour (1985). After decades of being absent from Madonna's own albums and unavailable on digital platforms, "Gambler" was released worldwide on streaming and digital services in December 2022.

== Background and development ==
In September 1983, Madonna was cast as a nightclub singer in Vision Quest (1985), a coming-of-age sports drama directed by Harold Becker, produced by Jon Peters and Peter Guber, and based on Terry Davis's 1979 novel of the same name. The film stars Matthew Modine as Louden Swain, a high school wrestler from Spokane, Washington, who falls in love with Carla (Linda Fiorentino), an older woman renting a room in his father's house. At the time, Madonna had recently signed with Sire Records and was seeking to establish herself as an actress. She secured the small, non-speaking role after auditioning for Peters in New York. Her scenes were filmed at Spokane's Big Foot Tavern in late November 1983. Modine recalled that although the producers predicted she would become a major star, she was still largely unknown when she arrived on set and "people [were] not really impressed".

Music played a prominent role in Vision Quest, and Phil Ramone was hired as the film's music supervisor. For the soundtrack, released through Geffen Records, Ramone assembled a collection of previously released rock songs and new recordings. Madonna recorded two songs for the project: "Crazy for You", a ballad written by John Bettis and Jon Lind, and "Gambler", which she wrote herself. She also wrote "Warning Signs", which was ultimately omitted from the soundtrack and remains commercially unreleased. According to author Matthew Rettenmund, Madonna may have written another song titled "Lies in Your Eyes". While working on "Crazy for You", Madonna developed "Gambler" from an earlier demo titled "Ambushed", which she had recorded with musician Leslie Ming and engineer Don Feinberg in 1982 using an Oberheim DMX drum machine. In the film, Madonna performs "Gambler" during a scene in which Louden first enters a nightclub.

== Recording and composition ==
"Gambler"
20-second sample of "Gambler". The refrain features a prominent guitar riff, synthesizers, and Madonna's husky lower-register vocals, while its lyrics emphasize independence and self-determination.

"Gambler" was recorded twice, with the version heard in Vision Quest differing from the one that was ultimately released as a single. The first recording took place in Los Angeles in November 1983, with Ramone producing. However, this version reportedly failed to satisfy record executives. Geffen consequently enlisted John "Jellybean" Benitez, a DJ, musician and producer who had worked with Madonna on her debut album to produce the new version. Stephen Bray, another frequent collaborator, provided the musical arrangements, while Greg Fulginiti mastered the recording at Artisan Sound Recorders in Hollywood. "Gambler" was the last song Madonna wrote entirely on her own until "Hey You" (2007).

Musically, it has been noticed an uptempo dance-pop and synth-disco song with rock influences. Alfred Soto of Stylus Magazine characterized "Gambler" as "disco-punk". In The Complete Guide to the Music of Madonna, Rikky Rooksby noted that the song resembles the style of Madonna's debut, although its arrangement is less repetitive. It opens with drums, electronic handclaps and percussion, followed by a synthesized bassline and high-pitched keyboards. A prominent four-note guitar riff runs alongside the bassline, while Madonna sings the refrain in a husky lower register. The song moves quickly through a four-chord refrain and a brief three-chord verse before reaching a bridge featuring heavily echoed, low-pitched vocals, which Rooksby likened to the sound of Blondie. The closing section introduces a new musical passage accompanied by the repeated phrase "You can't stop me now" and whistling.

Lyrically, "Gambler" explores female independence and self-determination through declarations such as "You can't stop me now" and "'Cause I'm a gambler, I only play the game my way". The narrator's assertive personality was partly inspired by Fiorentino's character in Vision Quest. Explaining the song's meaning, Madonna stated: "['Gambler'] is really the girl's point of view, because she's, like, an unstoppable person. She doesn't really need this guy".

== Release ==
The release of "Gambler" was complicated by a dispute between Warner Bros., Madonna's record label, and Geffen Records, which distributed the Vision Quest soundtrack. Originally scheduled for March 1984, the film was delayed for nearly a year, during which Madonna's popularity grew considerably following the success of her singles "Holiday", "Borderline" and "Lucky Star", as well as her second studio album, Like a Virgin (1984). By the time Vision Quest premiered in February 1985, Like a Virgin had reached number one on the albums chart, its title track had recently topped the Billboard Hot 100, and "Material Girl" was climbing the chart. Warner Bros. Records chairman Mo Ostin opposed the release of additional Madonna singles, fearing they would divert attention from Like a Virgin and generate overexposure. He consequently asked Warner chairman Robert A. Daly to withdraw both "Gambler" and "Crazy for You" from the soundtrack. Following negotiations between the company's record and film divisions, an agreement was reached allowing "Crazy for You" to be released as a single in the United States, but not "Gambler".

"Gambler" was released as a single outside the United States on October 3, 1985. Its original seven-inch version appeared on the Vision Quest soundtrack, while extended dance and instrumental mixes were issued on international physical singles. The song remained unavailable on digital platforms for more than 37 years and had not been included on any of Madonna's own albums. On December 9, 2022, all three versions were released worldwide through Rhino Entertainment and Warner Music Group, marking the song's debut on streaming services and digital retailers. According to a Rhino representative, the reissue was made at Madonna's personal request as part of the catalog campaign announced in 2021.

No music video was filmed for "Gambler"; instead, a promotional clip was assembled combining scenes from Vision Quest with footage of Madonna performing the song. It opens with a film slate being clapped in front of Madonna, who pauses before and after her performance. The clip was added to MTV's rotation during the week of February 2, 1985. It remained in rotation through February and returned from late June to early July that year.

== Critical reception ==
Critical reception of "Gambler" was mixed. Matt Damsker of the Los Angeles Times highlighted Madonna's rock-oriented performance, describing its effect as "suitably sultry". Larry Canale, editor of Digital Audio's Guide to Compact Discs, considered "Gambler" and "Crazy for You" the "main attractions" of the Vision Quest soundtrack, which he gave a lukewarm review. Andrew Unterberger of Billboard called the song a "blast", but felt it sounded as though it had been written "in the dressing room ten minutes earlier". Ed Gonzalez of Slant Magazine described "Gambler" as an "infectious marriage" of Madonna's assertiveness and Benitez's "all-pelvic-thrust production", although he felt it would have benefited from a "sneaking sense of vulnerability".

Other assessments were more reserved. Music Week described "Gambler" as a "predictable bouncy dance number", finding it "little different to [Madonna's] other hits". Rooksby considered it "fairly ordinary", while Daryl Easlea, author of Madonna: Blond Ambition, found it "moderately generic", particularly when compared with "Crazy for You". Peter Edwards of The Leader-Post similarly deemed it acceptable but unremarkable. Terry Hazlett of the Observer–Reporter described the song as "inoffensive, danceable [but] ultimately forgettable". Tom Long of the Santa Cruz Sentinel found it "somewhat lackluster", contrasting Benitez's production unfavorably with Nile Rodgers' work on Like a Virgin. More dismissive were Chris Roberts of Sounds, who called it "garbage", and Drew Tinnin of /Film, who deemed it "instantly forgettable". In the sixth annual Smash Hits readers' poll, "Gambler" was voted the sixth-worst song of 1985.

In retrospective assessments, "Gambler" has been ranked among Madonna's best songs by TheBacklot.com, Billboard, PinkNews, Rolling Stone, and USA Today. Alex Henderson of AllMusic called it an "ultra-infectious gem" that "should have been a major hit". Soto considered "Gambler" the "most aggressive" track of Madonna's career and lamented its omission from The Immaculate Collection (1990), arguing that it deserved to be remembered alongside "Into the Groove". Tom Breihan of Stereogum praised the song as a "classic early-Madonna banger", while Andrew Ryce of Resident Advisor hailed it as a "long-lost classic", highlighting its "ringing guitar riff" and "monstrously hooky" refrain. Graham Gremore of Queerty included it among Madonna's most underrated songs, noting that it had been largely forgotten and overshadowed by her bigger hits of the period. Unterberger referred to "Gambler" as the "unofficial end" of the Like a Virgin era, describing it as Madonna's "final jolt of gooey synth-pop" before her transition to "weightier fare" with True Blue (1986).

== Chart performance ==
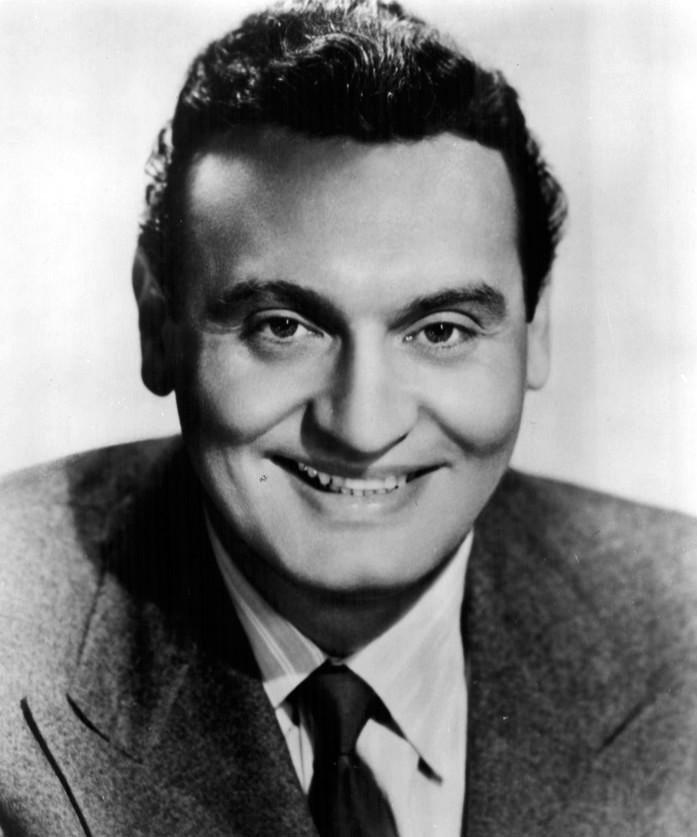
With "Gambler", Madonna equalled Frankie Laine's (pictured in 1954) record of seven UK top-ten singles in a single year.

"Gambler" achieved its greatest commercial success in the United Kingdom, where it debuted at number 20 on the UK Singles Chart on October 12, 1985, becoming the week's second-highest new entry behind Simple Minds' "Alive and Kicking". It rose to number seven the following week, making Madonna the third artist, after Frankie Laine and Ruby Murray, to score seven top-ten singles in a single calendar year. "Gambler" subsequently peaked at number four and spent 14 weeks on the chart, including four in the top ten. It ranked 62nd on the UK year-end singles chart and was certified silver by the British Phonographic Industry (BPI) on November 1, 1985. By May 1986, the song had sold 250,000 copies in the country. By October 2010, its UK sales had reached 295,000 copies.

Elsewhere in Europe, "Gambler" peaked at number three in Ireland, behind Jennifer Rush's "The Power of Love" and "Alive and Kicking". It also reached number three on Italy, number four in Finland, number five in Denmark, and number seven in the Netherlands. The song also reached the top ten in Norway and Belgium, while achieving more modest success in Switzerland, Germany, and France. On the European Hot 100 Singles, "Gambler" peaked at number eight on December 2, 1985, becoming Madonna's fifth top-ten entry of the year after "Like a Virgin", "Material Girl", "Crazy for You", and "Into the Groove".

Outside Europe, "Gambler" reached number ten in Australia, where Madonna simultaneously held another top-ten position with "Dress You Up" at number eight. It achieved less success in New Zealand and Japan, peaking at numbers 45 and 78, respectively. Following its digital release in December 2022, "Gambler" debuted at number 35 on the US Billboard's Digital Song Sales chart and number 45 on its Canadian counterpart. In the United Kingdom, it reached number 16 on the UK Singles Downloads Chart. The single also topped the iTunes chart in Israel and entered the platform's top ten in several other countries.

== Live performance and covers ==
Madonna performed "Gambler" live only during the Virgin Tour (1985). For the number, she wore a fringed black outfit with a waistcoat and dark sunglasses. Biographer Carol Clerk pointed out that the singer gyrated against a pole and crawled between her guitarist's legs, while the Pittsburgh Post-Gazette's Jeff Sewald described her performance as "go-go style". A recording of the performance at Detroit's Cobo Arena was included in the tour's video release.

In 1985, Renee Sandstrom performed "Gambler" in "Material Girl", an episode of the American children's television series Kids Incorporated. In 2003, musicians Scott Harrison and Patrik Tirda recorded their own version of the song before forming the Boston-based band Burnt Fur.

== Track listing and formats ==
- Seven-inch single
1. "Gambler" – 3:54
2. "Nature of the Beach" (Black 'n Blue) – 3:45
- Twelve-inch single
1. "Gambler" (extended dance mix) – 5:34
2. "Gambler" (instrumental remix) – 3:55
3. "Nature of the Beach" (Black 'n Blue) – 3:45
- US seven-inch promo single
1. "Crazy for You" – 4:08
2. "Gambler" – 3:54
- 2022 digital single
1. "Gambler" (7" version) – 3:51
2. "Gambler" (extended dance mix) – 5:40
3. "Gambler" (instrumental remix) – 3:53

== Credits and personnel ==
Credits and personnel are adapted from the Vision Quest soundtrack liner notes.

- Madonna – songwriter, vocals
- John "Jellybean" Benitez – producer
- Stephen Bray – arranger
- Greg Fulginiti – mastering
- John Kalodner – executive producer
- Armando Gallo – photography
- Tomcat – sleeve design

== Charts ==
=== Weekly charts ===
1985 weekly chart performance for "Gambler"
Chart (1985)	Peak position
Australia (Kent Music Report)	10
Belgium (Ultratop 50 Flanders)	10
European Hot 100 Singles (Music & Media)	8
Finland (Suomen virallinen lista)	4
France (SNEP)	33
Germany (GfK)	25
Italy (Musica e dischi)	10
Ireland (IRMA)	3
Japan (Oricon)	78
Netherlands (Dutch Top 40)	9
Netherlands (Single Top 100)	7
Norway (VG-lista)	9
New Zealand (Recorded Music NZ)	45
Switzerland (Schweizer Hitparade)	23
UK Singles (Official Charts)	4

2022 weekly chart performance for "Gambler"
Chart (2022)	Peak position
Canada Digital Song Sales (Billboard)	45
UK Singles Downloads Chart	16
US Digital Song Sales (Billboard)	35

=== Year-end charts ===
1985 year-end chart performance for "Gambler"
Chart (1985)	Position
UK Singles (Gallup)	62

== Certifications and sales ==
Certifications and sales for "Gambler"
Region	Certification	Certified units/sales
Japan (Oricon Charts)	—	8,510
United Kingdom (BPI)	Silver	295,000

== Literary sources ==
- Bego, Mark (1985). Madonna!. Pinnacle Books. ISBN 978-0-523-42576-4.
- Bego, Mark (2000). Madonna: Blonde Ambition. Cooper Square Press. ISBN 978-0-8154-1051-5.
- Canale, Larry, ed. (1986). Digital Audio's Guide to Compact Discs. Bantam Books. ISBN 978-0-553-34356-4.
- Clerk, Carol (2012). Madonnastyle. Omnibus Press. ISBN 978-2-909828-89-3.
- Easlea, Daryl (2012). Madonna: Blond Ambition. Backbeat Books. ISBN 978-1-61713-034-2.
- Gabriel, Mary (2023). Madonna: A Rebel Life. Hachette UK. ISBN 978-0-316-45644-9.
- Griffin, Nancy; Masters, Kim (1997). Hit and Run: How Jon Peters and Peter Guber took Sony for a ride in Hollywood. Simon & Schuster. ISBN 978-0-684-83266-1.
- King, James (2018). Fast Times and Excellent Adventures: The Surprising History of the '80s Teen Movie. Little, Brown and Company. ISBN 978-1-4721-2373-2.
- Koopmans, Andy (2003). Madonna. Lucent Books. ISBN 978-1-59018-138-6.
- Rettenmund, Matthew (1995). Encyclopedia Madonnica. St. Martin's Press. ISBN 978-0-312-11782-5.
- Rooksby, Rikky (2004). The Complete Guide to the Music of Madonna. Omnibus Press. ISBN 978-0-7119-9883-4.
- Schwichtenberg, Cathy, ed. (1993). The Madonna Connection: Representational Politics, Subcultural Identities, and Cultural Theory. Westview Press. ISBN 978-0-8133-1396-2.
