= Crazy for You (Madonna song) =

1985 single by Madonna

Single by Madonna

from the album Vision Quest
- B-side: "No More Words" (Berlin)
- Released: March 2, 1985
- Recorded: November 1983
- Studio: Sigma Sound (New York City)
- Genre: Pop
- Length: 4:08
- Label: Geffen; CBS
- Songwriters: John Bettis; Jon Lind
- Producer: John "Jellybean" Benitez

Madonna singles chronology
"Material Girl" (1984)	"Crazy for You" (1985)	"Angel" (1985)

Alternate cover
- Artwork for the 1991 European release

Music video
- "Crazy for You" on YouTube

"Crazy for You" is a song by American singer Madonna from the soundtrack to the 1985 film Vision Quest. Written by John Bettis and Jon Lind, it was produced by John "Jellybean" Benitez and released as a single by Geffen Records on March 2, 1985. The song was commissioned by Warner Bros. Pictures music executive Joel Sill for a romantic scene in the film, in which Madonna also makes a brief appearance as a nightclub singer. Although accounts differ as to who proposed Madonna for the recording, her selection initially surprised Bettis and Lind, who questioned whether the dance-pop singer could perform a ballad. Originally recorded in 1983 under the supervision of Phil Ramone, "Crazy for You" was subsequently re-recorded by Benitez, with an orchestral-style arrangement by Rob Mounsey. Its release prompted a dispute between Warner Bros. Records and Warner Bros. Pictures, as record executives feared it would compete with Madonna's second studio album, Like a Virgin (1984). A pop ballad with torch song influences, the song marked a departure from Madonna's earlier dance-oriented material, with lyrics exploring romantic attraction and sexual desire.

Upon release, "Crazy for You" received generally positive reviews from music critics, who praised its romantic atmosphere and Madonna's vocal performance. The song became Madonna's second number-one single on the US Billboard Hot 100, topping the chart for three weeks. It also reached number one in Australia and Canada. It peaked at number two in New Zealand and the United Kingdom, while the Recording Industry Association of America (RIAA) certified it gold for sales of one million copies in the United States. The song was reissued in the United Kingdom and Europe in February 1991 to promote Madonna's first compilation album, The Immaculate Collection (1990), and again peaked at number two on the UK Singles Chart. Although no official music video was filmed, Geffen assembled a promotional clip combining scenes from Vision Quest with footage of Madonna performing the song.

As Madonna's first major hit ballad, "Crazy for You" helped demonstrate her musical versatility and introduced her to a more mature, adult contemporary audience. It earned the singer her first Grammy Award nomination, for Best Female Pop Vocal Performance. Madonna has performed the song on three of her concert tours, the last being the Celebration Tour (2023–2024). It has also been covered by numerous artists, including New Found Glory, Groove Armada and Kelly Clarkson, and featured in films and television series such as 13 Going on 30 (2004). Retrospective assessments have recognized "Crazy for You" as one of Madonna's greatest songs and among the greatest love songs of all time.

== Background ==
Following the success of Flashdance (1983), which grossed over $200 million at the box office, Jon Peters and Peter Guber produced D.C. Cab, which was a critical and commercial failure. Their next project, and their first with Warner Bros. Pictures, was an adaptation of Terry Davis' 1979 novel Vision Quest. Directed by Harold Becker, the film—also titled Vision Quest—stars Matthew Modine as Louden Swain, a high school wrestler from Spokane, Washington, who falls in love with Carla (Linda Fiorentino), an older woman renting a room in his father's house. Joel Sill, Warner Bros. Pictures music vice president, was given the task of putting together the soundtrack. Phil Ramone, who had worked with Peters and Guber on Flashdance, was hired as music supervisor. Ramone decided to repeat the approach he had used on Flashdance and build the Vision Quest soundtrack around previously released rock songs, including Foreigner's "Hot Blooded" (1978), Red Rider's "Lunatic Fringe" (1981), and "Change" (1982) by John Waite.

In September 1983, Peters began looking for a singer to appear in a small nightclub role in the film. He contacted casting director Cis Corman, who was attempting to develop a film project around Madonna, then interested in pursuing an acting career herself. Peters and Ramone were already aware of Madonna, who had recently signed to Sire Records, a subsidiary of Warner Bros. Records, and had been impressed after seeing her perform in New York City. Ramone subsequently took her to dinner at the home of Barbra Streisand, Peters' former girlfriend, where she played some of her music videos, impressing them with her "self-possession [and] fishnet-crucifix style". Madonna's manager Freddy DeMann also arranged a meeting with Peters, who tested her at a New York studio and decided to cast her as the nightclub singer in Vision Quest. According to Madonna, the filmmakers wanted "a real singer [...] someone with a lot of style already". Peters had previously considered her for the 1986 comedy Ruthless People, but Touchstone Pictures quickly rejected the idea.

Madonna's scenes were filmed at Spokane's Big Foot Tavern in late November 1983. Modine recalled that although the producers predicted she would become a major star, she was still largely unknown when she arrived on set and "people [were] not really impressed". Madonna was "ecstatic" about the opportunity, describing it as "extremely important" because it could introduce her to audiences not only as a singer, but also as a performer and actress. The experience itself, however, proved less exciting: she recalled that the shoot was "cold, lonely and boring".

== Development ==
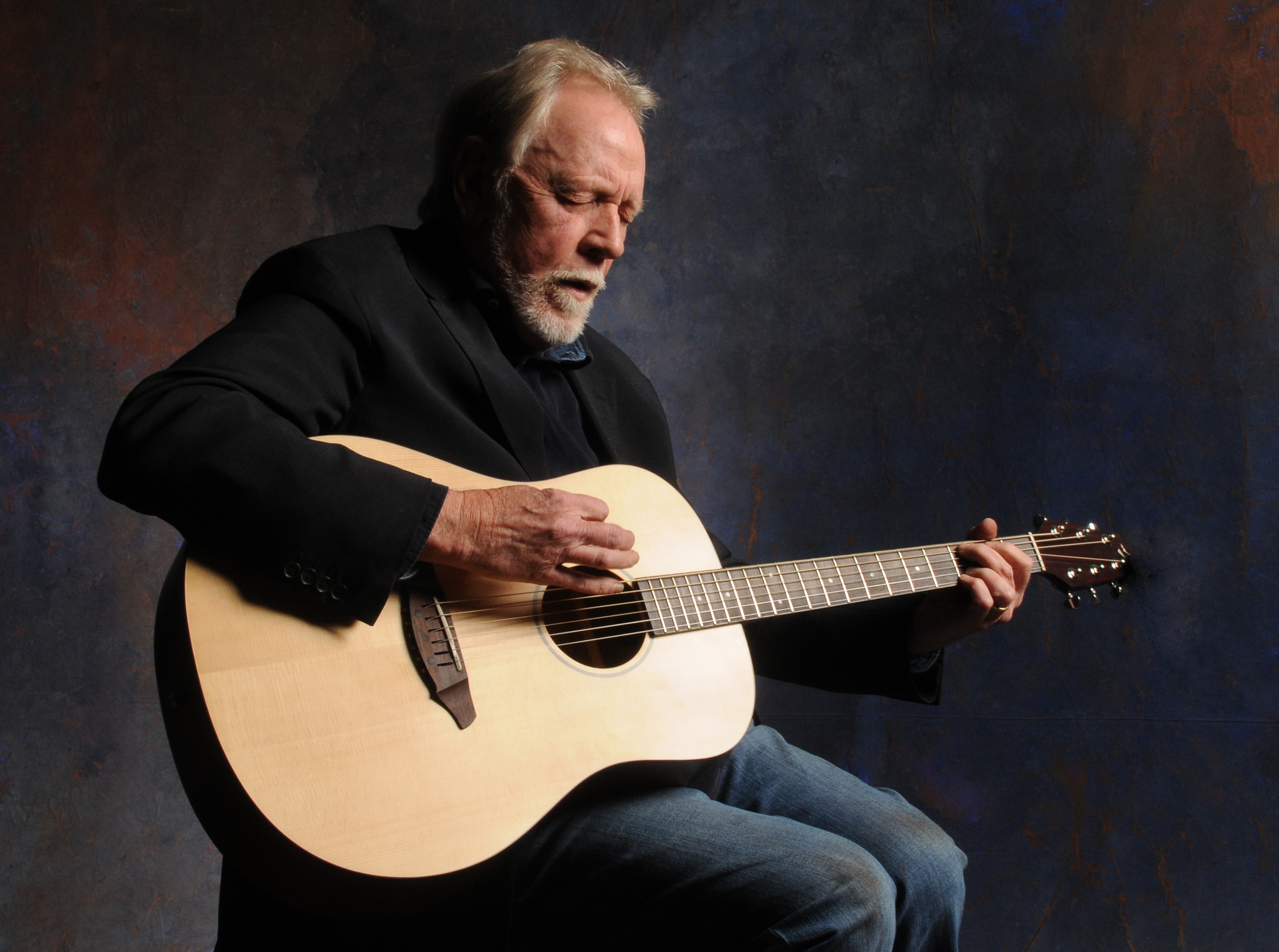
The lyrics to "Crazy for You" were written by John Bettis (pictured in 2013)

Sill contacted lyricist John Bettis to write new material for Vision Quest. After reading the script, Bettis identified the nightclub scene in which Louden first sees Carla and the two dance together as the best opportunity for a song. He then went to the home of his collaborator Jon Lind, who had already begun working on a groove and played him the beginnings of the refrain. The music surprised Bettis, who had expected "something a little more R&B" from Lind, but recalled immediately liking what he heard. While the two worked on the song, Lind sang the phrase "crazy for you", which Bettis felt was "really descriptive of [the scene in the film]" and became its title.

Bettis recalled that the lyrics came to him "literally almost like dictation". He avoided making the song "too sweet", believing such an approach would not suit the scene. Instead, he sought a more sensual quality inspired by Noël Coward and Cole Porter, explaining that the flow of the words and the movement of the singer's lips were intended to contribute to the song's sensuality. Bettis and Lind completed "Crazy for You" in a single day and submitted it to Sill.

The studio responded favorably to the song, although accounts differ as to who suggested Madonna as its performer. Michael Sandoval, then head of professional management at Warner Chappell Music, recalled proposing her for the recording, while another account credits Ramone.Kohn & Kohn 1996, p. 88</ref> Bettis was on vacation when Sill informed him that Ramone, impressed by "Crazy for You", wanted Madonna to record it. Her selection was described as an act of "smart corporate synergy", since Warner Bros. was behind Vision Quest and Madonna's label, Sire, was a subsidiary of Warner Bros. Records; Peters also believed her involvement would give the soundtrack a more contemporary sound.

Artistically, however, Madonna was an unconventional choice. Bettis and Lind regarded her primarily as a dance-pop singer and questioned whether she could handle a ballad; with "Borderline" then receiving airplay, Bettis recalled reacting, "This is for Madonna? Really? Can she even sing a song like this?", adding that the choice "surprised us at the time". Madonna recognized what a ballad could do for her career and saw it as an opportunity to demonstrate that she could explore other musical styles, but was concerned about how the song would be received by her growing fan base. According to Bettis, she questioned him about the lyrics and made him "defend everything" he had written, with some of his explanations requiring further discussion before meeting with her approval. Despite her reservations, Bettis recalled that Madonna "knew she wanted to record it" .

== Recording ==
"['Crazy for You'] was recorded live. It was the first time that I produced a live session, as opposed to having synthesizers and drum machines do everything. [...] Everything I did was totally on instinct. I tried to make the song stand on its own, but at the same time work in the two scenes in which it was used in the movie".

— John "Jellybean" Benitez on recording "Crazy for You".

"Crazy for You" was recorded twice, with the version heard in Vision Quest differing from the one that was ultimately released as a single. The first recording took place in Los Angeles in November 1983, with Ramone producing. Bettis recalled that the session "didn't go all that well", seemingly confirming his and Lind's initial doubts about Madonna's suitability for the song. Left "depressed" by the results, they worried that "Crazy for You" would be dropped from Vision Quest altogether. The recording was nevertheless retained for Madonna's nightclub performance in the film, although neither Bettis nor the singer believed it sounded like a hit.

For the Vision Quest soundtrack, Geffen Records commissioned a new version of "Crazy for You" that was "more in keeping with what Madonna was doing" and could be released as a single. By then, Madonna had become a major recording star, and stronger performances were sought for the soundtrack than those heard in the original film recording. Geffen consequently enlisted John "Jellybean" Benitez, a DJ, musician and producer who had previously worked with Madonna on her debut album to produce the new version. "Crazy for You" was Benitez's first ballad, and he recalled drawing on his memories of dancing to slow records as a teenager while recording it.

Benitez enlisted arranger Rob Mounsey, who devised an orchestral-style arrangement and played keyboards, principally a Roland Jupiter-8 and Yamaha DX7, as well as piano and backing vocals. At Madonna's suggestion, George Marge added the prominent oboe part. The new version was recorded at Sigma Sound Studios in New York under a tight deadline, as the filmmakers were prepared to proceed with the original recording. Madonna objected to the song's original bridge and wrote a replacement, which Bettis and Lind rejected. Bettis and Lind initially "freaked out a little bit" upon hearing the bridge-free recording, but ultimately approved it. Bettis was particularly impressed by Mounsey's contribution, crediting him with turning the song into a "real hit". After returning from work in England, Bettis learned that the new recording would be released when Lind showed him the record and announced, "We've got Madonna's next single".

== Composition and use on Vision Quest ==
As her first ballad, "Crazy for You" marked a stylistic departure from Madonna's earlier dance-oriented releases. Described as a pop ballad with torch song influences, it has also been characterized as a power ballad. Tom Breihan of Stereogum described its sound as "dance-pop rendered in a ballad context". The song's rhythm evokes the hazy atmosphere of a lounge club, while its arrangement opens with an oboe and a sliding electric guitar chord, motifs that recur throughout the track. The verses feature a relatively sparse accompaniment of synthesized bass, harp and a single-note guitar figure. Author Rikky Rooksby observed that a fuller rhythmic arrangement emerges only shortly before the refrain, which develops gradually rather than relying on the repetitive chord patterns characteristic of some of Madonna's earlier singles.

'Crazy for You'
24-second audio sample of "Crazy for You". The refrain highlights Madonna's husky vocals and the song's fuller arrangement, expressing romantic desire.

Madonna's vocal performance has been characterized as "passionate" and "earnest", with a husky quality punctuated by audible breaths and vocal breaks. Breihan observed that her elongated delivery of the title phrase occasionally resembles that of a country singer, while Rooksby noted that the melody pushes her voice toward the upper end of her range. The combination of synthesizers and acoustic instrumentation gives the recording a soft, cinematic quality, as noted by Stephen Thomas Erlewine. Rather than concluding with a climactic high note, Madonna stops singing near the coda and delivers the final "I'm crazy for you" in a spoken, deadpan manner. Music critic Dave Marsh argued that this moment transforms the song from the "theme of a teenage melodrama" into an adult love song.

Lyrically, "Crazy for You" was described by author Daryl Easlea as a "direct love song". It explores attraction and sexual desire, expressing feelings that Louden in Vision Quest is unable to articulate directly. Its narrative follows an encounter in a crowded bar, where the narrator notices a stranger through the "smoky room". The two exchange glances and eventually dance, their growing intimacy culminating in a kiss. Critics have particularly noted the song's portrayal of female desire. Marsh compared it to an updated version of the Crystals' "Then He Kissed Me" (1963), arguing that Madonna expresses sexual desire more explicitly than female singers of the earlier era. William McKeen similarly interpreted songs such as "Crazy for You" as portraying women who initiate and enjoy sexual relationships, while Richard Middleton suggested that its warmer timbre and romantic lyrics allowed Madonna to assume the more traditional role of a romantic protagonist. Breihan, however, observed that although Madonna sounds firmly in control, her delivery also conveys nervousness and vulnerability, suggesting either an uncertainty about her own power or a willingness to surrender it to someone else.

"Crazy for You" serves as a recurring love theme in Vision Quest, accompanying several key scenes, including a romantic montage depicting the developing relationship between Louden and Carla through outings together and their first sexual encounter. The song also takes on a different context during a training montage in which Louden channels his sexual frustrations into intense physical exercise. Madonna also performs "Crazy for You" onscreen in a brief appearance as a nightclub singer. When Louden first enters the bar, she is seen performing "Gambler", her other contribution to the film. Later, she sings "Crazy for You" as Louden and Carla share a slow dance. Her appearances are limited to brief shots interspersed with scenes of the protagonists.

== Release ==
According to the Los Angeles Times, there were "enormous arguments" between executives at Warner's record and film divisions over the release of "Crazy for You". Vision Quest had originally been scheduled for release in March 1984, but delays in post-production postponed its premiere for almost a year. During that time, Madonna's popularity grew considerably with the success of "Holiday", "Borderline" and "Lucky Star", while her second studio album, Like a Virgin, was released several months before the film. By the time Vision Quest premiered in February 1985, Like a Virgin topped the albums chart, its title track had recently left the top position of the Billboard Hot 100, and "Material Girl" was climbing the chart.

Warner Bros. Records chief Mo Ostin opposed releasing "Crazy for You" as a single, fearing it would divert attention from Like a Virgin. The situation was complicated by the fact that the Vision Quest soundtrack was released through Geffen Records, meaning Warner could not prevent Geffen from capitalizing on Madonna's growing popularity. Executives were also concerned about overexposure, as her music videos were already receiving heavy rotation on MTV. Ostin consequently approached Warner chairman Robert A. Daly and asked that "Crazy for You" and "Gambler" be withdrawn. Following a heated dispute between the record and film divisions, an agreement was reached: "Crazy for You" would be released as a single in the United States, while "Gambler" would not.

"Crazy for You" was officially released by Geffen Records on March 2, 1985. A remixed version of the song, produced by Shep Pettibone and Michael Hutchinson, was included on The Immaculate Collection (1990), Madonna's first compilation album. This version was issued as a single in the United Kingdom and Europe on February 18, 1991. "Crazy for You" was subsequently included on the compilations Something to Remember (1995) and Celebration (2009).

No music video was filmed for "Crazy for You"; Geffen instead assembled a promotional clip intercutting scenes from Vision Quest with Madonna performing the song. It was added to MTV during the week of February 2, 1985. Keith Thomas of The Spokesman-Review praised the editing, noting that scenes from the film "blend in well with [Madonna's] performance". Author Daryl Easlea argued that "film clips" such as "Crazy for You" reinforced Madonna's status as the decade's "video megastar", which she had established with "Like a Virgin" and "Material Girl". It can be found on the 2009 video compilation Celebration: The Video Collection.

== Critical reception ==
"Crazy for You" received generally positive reviews from music critics. Brian Chin of Billboard predicted it would be a "great single", while Cash Box observed that the ballad presented Madonna's voice in a more mature and commercially appealing context. Rooksby similarly noted that, compared with her previous singles, "Crazy for You" exhibited a "slight increase in sophistication". Music journalist Paul Du Noyer described it as a "breathless love song", highlighting its "sweeping" strings, "dreamy" refrain and intimate vocal delivery. Writting for The A.V. Club, Erlewine called it Madonna's "purest ballad to date", while Ed Masley of The Arizona Republic considered it her finest, describing it as a "soaring emotional prom theme for the ages". Katie Atkinson of Billboard highlighted its appeal to young couples hoping to slow dance while Louis Virtel of TheBacklot.com dubbed it Madonna's "ultimate slow dance" and praised its sincerity. Sebastián E. Alonso of Spanish website Jenesaispop regarded it as "possibly one of the most beautiful declarations of love ever sung".

Madonna's vocal performance also attracted praise for its emotional expressiveness. Chuck Arnold of Entertainment Weekly acknowledged that she would become a better singer on future ballads, but argued that the "raw, soulful yearning [on 'Crazy for You'] is something that they can't teach you in voice class". Similarly, PopMatters' Enio Chiola praised her ability to convey longing and desire, suggesting that her interpretation gave the song a distinctly personal quality despite her lack of involvement in its writing. Nicole Hogsett of Yahoo Voices felt that Madonna's deep, sensual vocals elevated an otherwise conventional love song into something more mature. Adam Graham of The Detroit News regarded it as one of her "most purely innocent moments", while biographer J. Randy Taraborrelli described "Crazy for You" as "sassy". Offering a more qualified assessment, Jude Rogers of The Guardian found the song "slightly soupy, but still sweet".

Other assessments were more reserved. Breihan praised the song's rhythmic foundation but found its prominent oboe unnecessarily evocative of easy listening, while James Hunter of LA Weekly considered the arrangement excessively ornate. Peter Edwards of The Leader-Post found the single acceptable but unremarkable. Matthew Jacobs of HuffPost acknowledged that "Crazy for You" featured some of Madonna's strongest vocals of the period and might remain her "greatest love ballad", but considered it "dull by today's standards". Reviewing its 1991 reissue, Andy Strickland of Record Mirror named it the week's best release, despite considering it one of Madonna's weaker performances; he noted that her voice occasionally struggled and suggested that Karen Carpenter would have delivered a better rendition. Both Eric Henderson of Slant Magazine and Duane Dudek of the Star-News regarded the song as exposing Madonna's early vocal weaknesses. The Chicago Tribune considered it "as mediocre" as "Material Girl" and named it among the year's most overrated and overplayed songs. Jean Carey of the Tampa Bay Times criticized its inclusion on The Immaculate Collection, calling it an "out-and-out dreadful ballad".

== Chart performance ==
During the week of March 2, 1985, "Crazy for You" was added to 91 reporting radio stations and debuted at number 55 on the Billboard Hot 100. It marked the fourth consecutive time Madonna had earned the chart's highest debut of the week, following "Lucky Star", "Like a Virgin" and "Material Girl". By the end of the month, it had reached number nine, giving Madonna her fifth consecutive top-ten hit in less than a year, a streak that began with "Borderline" in June 1984 and continued through "Material Girl". With the latter also in the top ten, Madonna became the third female solo artist since 1980 to simultaneously score two singles in the chart's top ten, after Diana Ross and Barbra Streisand. The following week, "Crazy for You" rose to number four while "Material Girl" was at number three, making Madonna the first artist since Michael Jackson in 1983 to simultaneously place two singles within the top five.

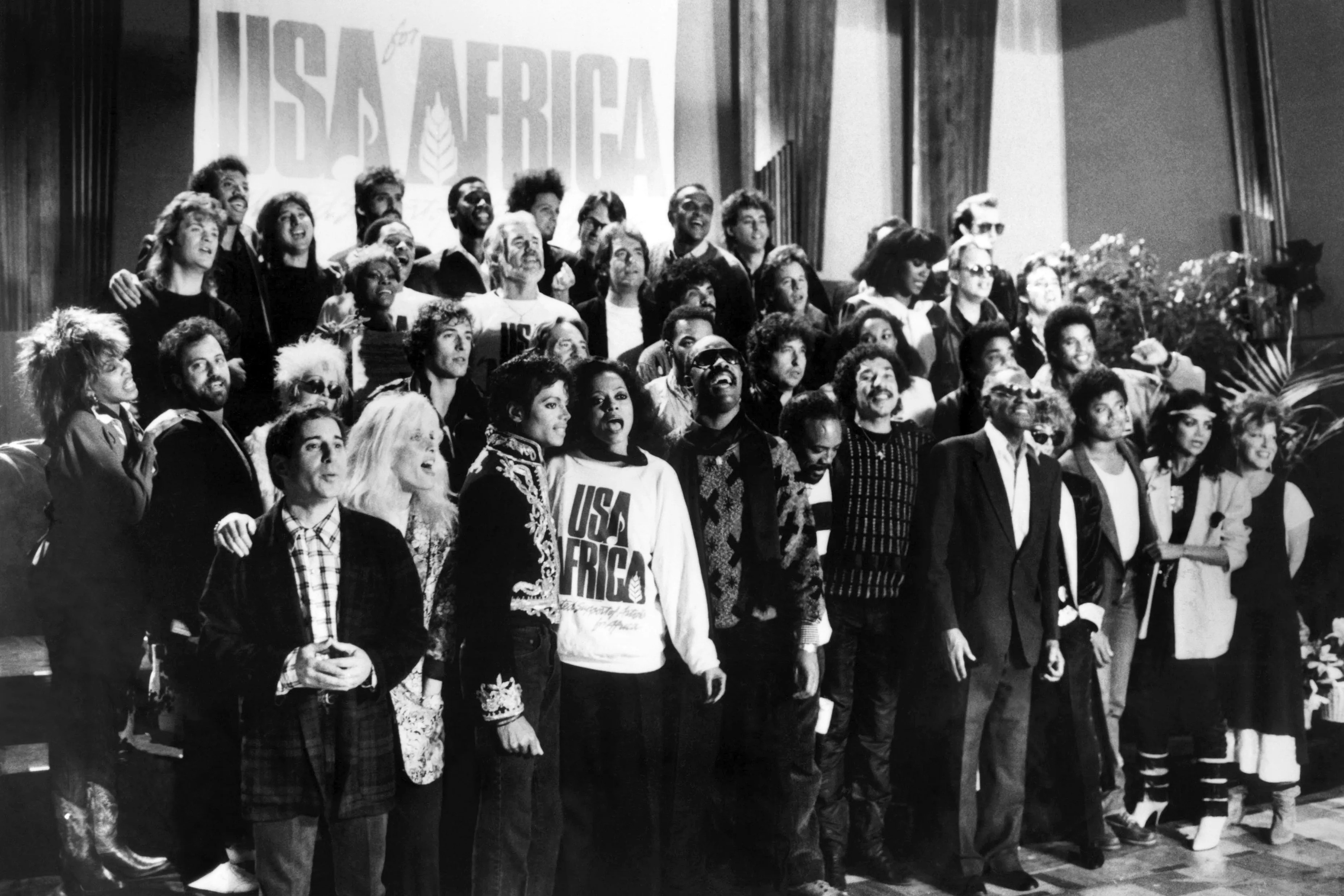
"Crazy for You" displaced "We Are the World" by supergroup USA for Africa (pictured) from the top spot of the Billboard Hot 100.

On May 11, after spending three consecutive weeks at number two, "Crazy for You" reached the Hot 100's top spot, displacing USA for Africa's "We Are the World" and becoming Madonna's second US number-one. A few days later, Benitez encountered "We Are the World" producer Quincy Jones and co-writer Lionel Richie at a restaurant and told them, "We just kicked 'We Are the World' out of No. 1". Benitez recalled that Jones jokingly responded by grabbing his arm and telling Richie, "You pull. We'll just break him in half".

"Crazy for You" was the second number-one for Geffen Records, following John Lennon's "(Just Like) Starting Over" (1980); the second for Bettis after "Top of the World" (1973) by the Carpenters; the first for Lind and Benitez, and the first from a movie since Stevie Wonder's "I Just Called to Say I Love You" (1984). According to Billboard, Benitez also became the first DJ to produce a Hot 100 number-one. The single spent 21 weeks on the Hot 100, nine of them in the top ten, and ranked ninth on the chart's 1985 year-end listing. In 2024, Billboard ranked "Crazy for You" as Madonna's second most successful single in Hot 100 history. It also peaked at number two on the Adult Contemporary chart, behind DeBarge's "Rhythm of the Night", and ranked 20th on its year-end chart. The Recording Industry Association of America (RIAA) certified the single gold on July 16, 1985, for sales of one million copies.

In Canada, "Crazy for You" debuted at number 70 on the RPM top singles chart on March 16, 1985, and reached number one ten weeks later, becoming Madonna's second chart-topper in the country after "Like a Virgin". It ranked seventh on RPM's year-end chart. Elsewhere in the Americas, the song reached the top ten in Peru, Paraguay and Puerto Rico.

In Australia, the song reached number one, displacing Madonna's own double A-side "Angel" / "Into the Groove" from the top spot. She consequently became the first artist to replace herself at number one in the country since ABBA a decade earlier. "Crazy for You" remained atop the chart for four consecutive weeks and ranked as Australia's third-best-selling single of 1985 behind "Angel" / "Into the Groove" and "We Are the World". In New Zealand, it spent four non-consecutive weeks at number two and was also the country's third-best-selling single of the year. In the UK Singles Chart, "Crazy for You" debuted at number 25 on June 8, 1985, and peaked at number two three weeks later, behind Sister Sledge's "Frankie". At the time, it was Madonna's highest-charting single in the country. Following its 1991 reissue, the song again reached number two. By 2017, "Crazy for You" had sold 782,000 copies and ranked as Madonna's third-best-selling single in the United Kingdom. On the European Hot 100 Singles, "Crazy for You" peaked at number seven in 1985 and number six in 1991. It also reached the top ten in Finland, and the top 20 in Belgium, the Netherlands, Spain, Sweden and Switzerland. It peaked at number seven in South Africa.

== Live performances ==
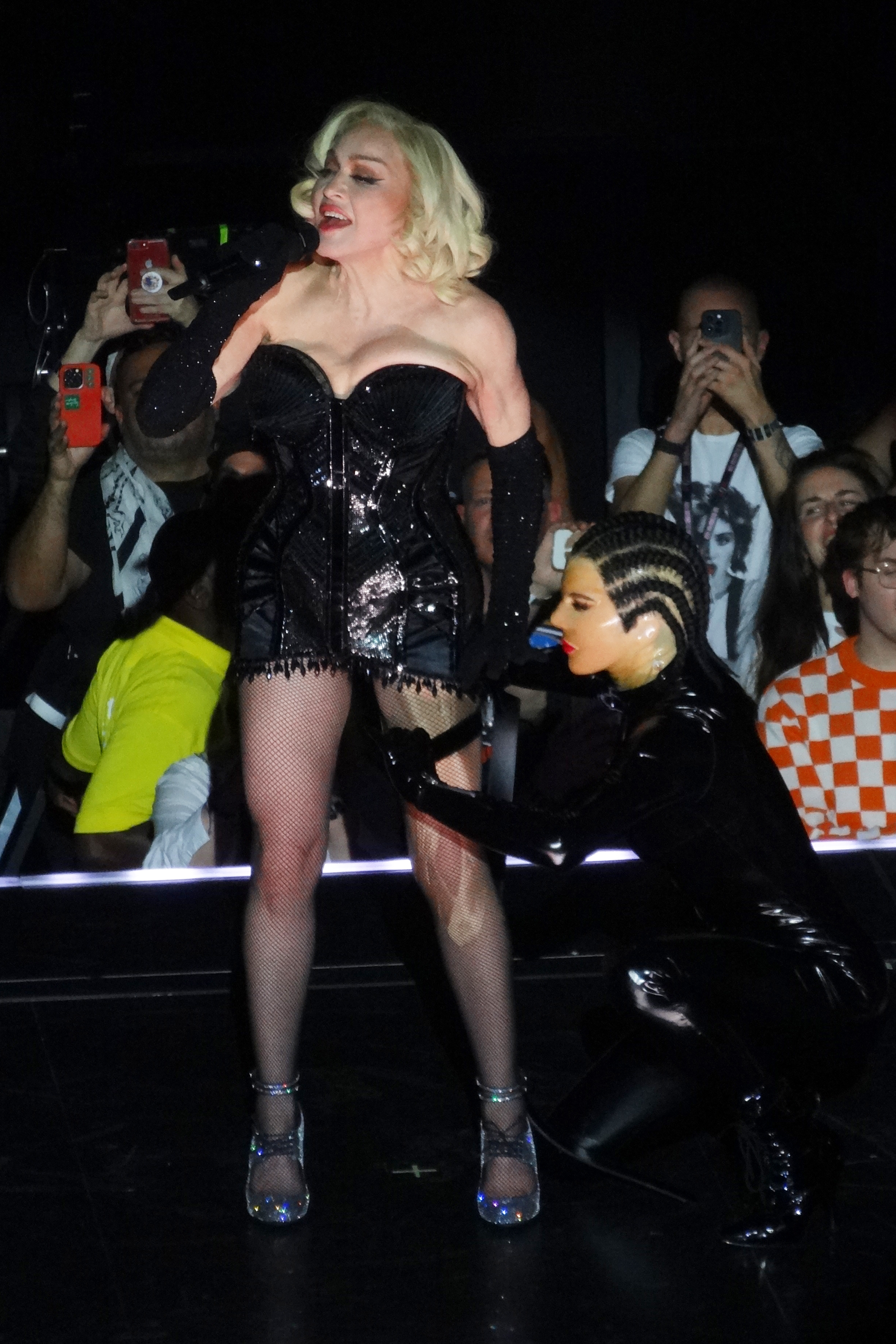
The Celebration Tour's mashup performance of "Human Nature" and "Crazy for You".

"Crazy for You" has been performed on three of Madonna's concert tours: Virgin (1985), Re-Invention (2004), and Celebration (2023–2024). On the first, Madonna sang as smoke billowed across the stage, wearing a black ensemble consisting of a fringed mini-top and skirt, accessorized with crucifixes of various sizes. Billboard's Paul Grein felt that she "was at her best on 'Crazy for You'", praising her use of a "deeper, huskier vocal quality" that mirrored the song's "deeper lyrical approach". A recording of the performance at Detroit's Cobo Arena was included in the tour's video release.

During the Re-Invention World Tour, Madonna dedicated "Crazy for You" to "the fans that've stood by me for the last twenty years", performing atop a rising platform while wearing a plaid kilt and a black T-shirt bearing the slogan "Kabbalists Do It Better". Sarah Rodman of the Boston Herald described it as a "sweet moment in what was a truly spectacular show".

On February 25, 2016, during the second Manila concert of the Rebel Heart Tour, Madonna performed "Crazy for You" in commemoration of the 30th anniversary of the People Power Revolution. Before the performance, she recalled the country's fight for "democracy and freedom", adding that "that's what a rebel heart fights for", before introducing the song in honor of the occasion. CNN Philippines reported that "the crowd went wild as [Madonna] hit the first few notes of her first ballad". She subsequently sang "Crazy for You" at her first concert in Singapore on February 28, and again during the tour's Brisbane stop on March 16.

For the Celebration Tour, "Crazy for You" was mashed up with "Human Nature" (1995). During the number, Madonna performs "Human Nature" after being arrested by dancers dressed as police officers, before being "rescued" by her younger self, portrayed by a dancer wearing the latex catsuit and braids from the song's music video. Madonna then transitions into "Crazy for You", a moment that PopMatters' Chris Rutherford described as a "touching recognition of her bravery". Mikael Wood of the Los Angeles Times, however, found the sequence confusing.

== Cover versions and usage ==
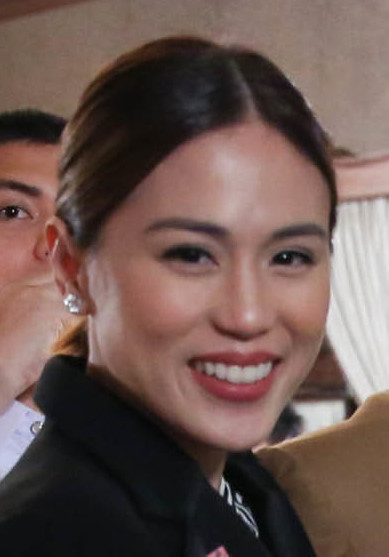
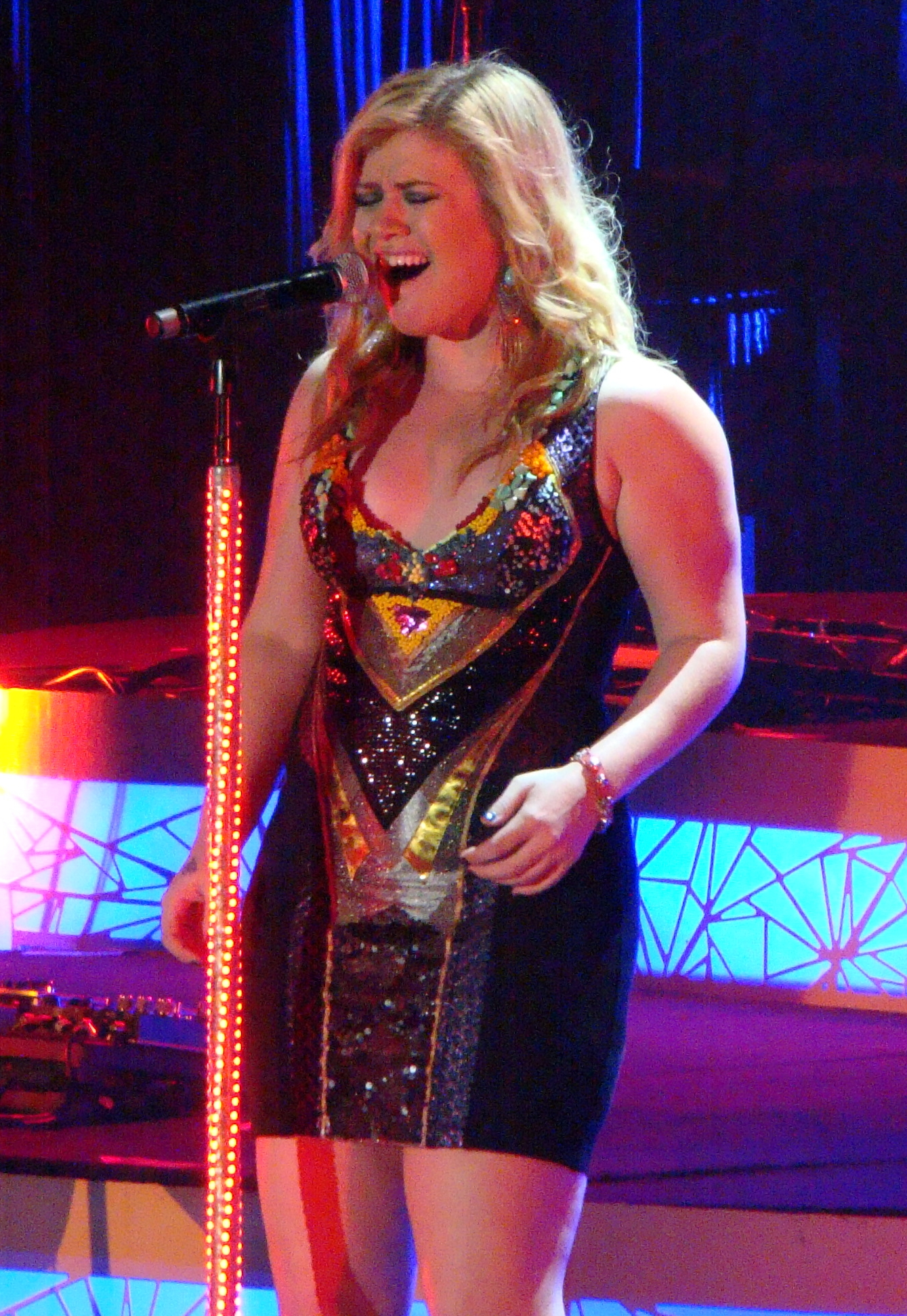
Toni Gonzaga (left, pictured in 2019) and Kelly Clarkson (right, pictured in 2012) are among the artists who have performed cover versions of "Crazy for You".

Several artists have recorded versions of "Crazy for You" in different languages and musical styles. Japanese singer Seiko Matsuda included a rendition on her 1991 album Eternal. In 2004, Miho Hatori recorded a jazz arrangement featuring a horn section for the compilation Sweetheart: Love Songs; William Tilland of AllMusic cited it as one of the album's highlights. During the 2000s, the song was covered by several Filipino artists, including Michael Cruz, MYMP, and Toni Gonzaga. Sponge Cola's 2003 live acoustic rendition gained popularity after circulating as an internet download through file-sharing services such as Kazaa. The cover became closely associated with the band, with some listeners even mistaking it for an original song; vocalist Yael Yuzon subsequently said that the group was trying to move away from being known as the "'Crazy for You' band".

In 2007, American rock band New Found Glory recorded a pop-punk version for From the Screen to Your Stereo Part II, while English electronic duo Groove Armada recorded the song with Alan Donohoe of the Rakes for Radio 1: Established 1967. BBC America subsequently ranked the latter 47th on its list of the best British songs of 2007. Also in 2007, Lion of Panjshir recorded a version featuring tabla, sitar and acoustic instrumentation for the Madonna tribute album Through the Wilderness. Pitchfork's Stephen Deusner praised Ariana Delawari's "bold, breathy" vocals and wrote that the rendition retained the original's "erotic spark". Kelly Clarkson performed "Crazy for You" by audience request during the Bossier City concert of her 2012 Stronger Tour, and Me First and the Gimme Gimmes recorded a ukulele-led version for Are We Not Men? We Are Diva! (2014).

"Crazy for You" has also appeared in film and television. In 1985, it was used in the Brazilian telenovela A Gata Comeu and initially appeared on its soundtrack album; after Warner Brazil failed to obtain permission for its inclusion in time, copies already distributed were withdrawn and the album was reissued with Sade's "Smooth Operator" (1984) in its place. Copies of the original pressing containing "Crazy for You" subsequently became sought-after collectors' items. An instrumental version was featured in the 1990 Full House episode "13 Candles". In the 2004 film 13 Going on 30, "Crazy for You" is used twice: first, when the teenage Jenna (Christa B. Allen) waits for her love interest Matt (Sean Marquette) in a closet, and again near the end, when their adult counterparts (Jennifer Garner and Mark Ruffalo) are married. The song was later performed by Chris Griffin in the 2008 Family Guy episode "Long John Peter", and by Adam Sandler and David Spade in the 2016 film The Do-Over. In the 2020 musical film Valley Girl, a remake of the 1983 film, Josh Whitehouse performs what Variety described as an "acoustic-sounding" rendition of "Crazy for You".

== Impact and recognition ==
The success of "Crazy for You" extended beyond its commercial performance. Peter Berk of Cash Box cited Vision Quest as an example of the increasingly valuable relationship between film and popular music, observing that although music could not "save a doomed film completely", Madonna's "monstrously popular hit" helped make its soundtrack "so magnetic to record buyers". Len Comaratta from Consequence similarly credited "Crazy for You", alongside Journey's "Only the Young", with driving the soundtrack's moderate success. The song also came to overshadow the film itself; Bego and Rebecca Gulick regarded it as its standout element, with Bego calling "Crazy for You" the "most remembered aspect" of Vision Quest. Similarly, Rik Flynn of Classic Pop wrote that the song "far outshone" the film, while Tom Eames of Smooth Radio remarked that, "[you'd] be forgiven for not remembering the movie ['Crazy for You'] came from". Breihan noted that Madonna's performance, despite being a brief, non-speaking cameo, "might still be the most famous thing about that movie". Its popularity was such that Vision Quest was retitled Crazy for You in several international markets to capitalize on Madonna's growing superstardom.

"Crazy for You" also marked an important shift in Madonna's musical image as her first major hit ballad. The Recording Academy credited the song with showcasing her vocal abilities while appealing to a more mature audience, while Rhino Entertainment described it as a "very important track" in Madonna's career, as it introduced her to an adult contemporary audience and demonstrated that she could move beyond dance-pop. Biographer J. Randy Taraborrelli similarly regarded it as proof that Madonna was "vocally capable of delivering a serious ballad" and could connect with "soul-bearing songs". Retrospective assessments have also viewed the song as an early demonstration of Madonna's musical range. Chiola said it "marked a new direction" in which she would excel, while PinkNews' Mayer Nissim argued that it helped counter perceptions of Madonna as "gloss and glamour" without range. Billboard's Katie Atkinson viewed the stylistic shift as foreshadowing "the versatility to come", and Wendy Meade of Biography credited the departure from Madonna's usual dance-pop sound with helping establish her as a "bona fide pop star". "Crazy for You" earned Madonna her first Grammy nomination, for Best Female Pop Vocal Performance, but lost to Whitney Houston's "Saving All My Love for You".

"Crazy for You" has been regarded as one of Madonna's greatest songs, (Note: Attributed to multiple sources, including The A.V. Club, The Arizona Republic, Billboard, TheBacklot.com, Classic Pop, The Detroit News, Entertainment Weekly, Forbes, Gay Star News, Jenesaispop, Parade, PinkNews, PopMatters, Rolling Stone, USA Today, and Yahoo Voices.) and one of the greatest love songs of all time. (Note: Attributed to multiple sources, including Entertainment Weekly, New York Daily News, New York Post, Rolling Stone, Smooth Radio, Stereogum, VH1, and Yahoo!) Billboard ranked it 27th on its list of the 75 best songs from movies, while Louis Virtel of Logo TV included it among Madonna's "great songs" recorded for "terrible" films. The song was included in Dave Marsh's The Heart of Rock & Soul: The 1001 Greatest Singles Ever Made, and Bruce Pollock's Rock Song Index: The 7500 Most Important Songs for the Rock & Roll Era.

== Track listing and formats ==
- US seven-inch single
1. "Crazy for You" – 4:08
2. "No More Words" (Berlin) – 3:54
- US seven-inch promo single
1. "Crazy for You" – 4:08
2. "Gambler" – 3:54
- International seven-inch single
1. "Crazy for You" – 4:08
2. "I'll Fall in Love Again" (Sammy Hagar) – 4:11
- Twelve-inch single
1. "Crazy for You" – 4:08
2. "I'll Fall in Love Again" (Sammy Hagar) – 4:11
3. "Only the Young" (Journey) – 4:01
- 1991 European twelve-inch and CD single
1. "Crazy for You" (Remix) – 3:44
2. "Keep It Together" (Shep Pettibone Remix) – 7:46
3. "Into the Groove" (Shep Pettibone Remix) – 8:28
- 1991 European seven-inch single, and British picture disc
1. "Crazy for You" (Remix) – 3:42
2. "Keep It Together" (Single Edit) – 4:30

== Credits and personnel ==
Credits and personnel are adapted from the Vision Quest soundtrack liner notes.

- Madonna – vocals
- John Bettis – songwriter
- Jon Lind – songwriter
- John "Jellybean" Benitez – producer
- Rob Mounsey – arrangement, synthesizers (Roland Jupiter-8 and Yamaha DX7), piano, backing vocals
- George Marge – oboe
- Stephen Bray – drums
- Greg Fulginiti – mastering

== Charts ==
=== Weekly charts ===
1985 weekly chart performance for "Crazy for You"
Chart (1985)	Peak position
Australia (Kent Music Report)	1
Austria (Ö3 Austria Top 40)	23
Belgium (Ultratop 50 Flanders)	13
Canada Top Singles (RPM)	1
European Hot 100 Singles (Music & Media)	7
Finland (Suomen virallinen lista)	9
France (SNEP)	47
Germany (GfK)	26
Italy (Musica e dischi)	12
Ireland (IRMA)	2
Netherlands (Dutch Top 40)	9
Netherlands (Single Top 100)	11
New Zealand (Recorded Music NZ)	2
Peru (UPI)	3
South Africa	7
Spain (PROMUSICAE)	17
Sweden (Sverigetopplistan)	13
Switzerland (Schweizer Hitparade)	16
UK Singles (Official Charts)	2
US Billboard Hot 100	1
US Adult Contemporary (Billboard)	2
US Hot R&B/Hip-Hop Songs (Billboard)	80
US Cash Box Top 100	2
US Radio & Records CHR & Pop Charts	1

1991 weekly chart performance for "Crazy for You"
Chart (1991)	Peak position
European Hot 100 Singles (Music & Media)	6
Ireland (IRMA)	3
UK Singles (OCC)	2

=== Year-end charts ===
1985 year-end chart performance for "Crazy for You"
Chart (1985)	Position
Australia (Kent Music Report)	3
Canada Top Singles (RPM)	7
Netherlands (Dutch Top 40)	89
Netherlands (Single Top 100)	58
New Zealand (Recorded Music NZ)	3
UK Singles (OCC)	16
US Billboard Hot 100	9
US Adult Contemporary (Billboard)	20
US Cash Box Top 100	9

1991 year-end chart performance for "Crazy for You"
Chart (1991)	Position
UK Singles (OCC)	46

=== Decade-end charts ===
Decade-end chart performance for "Crazy for You"
Chart (1980–1989)	Position
Australia (Kent Music Report)	79

=== All-time charts ===
All-time chart performance for "Crazy for You"
Chart (1958–2018)	Rank
US Billboard Hot 100 (Women)	88

== Certifications and sales ==
Certifications and sales for "Crazy for You"
Region	Certification	Certified units/sales
Japan	—	46,300
New Zealand (RMNZ)	Gold	15,000^{‡}
United Kingdom (BPI)	Gold	782,000
United States (RIAA)	Gold	2,000,000
Digital
United States	—	211,000
^{‡} Sales+streaming figures based on certification alone.

== Literary sources ==
- Andersen, Christopher P. (1992). Madonna, unauthorized. Signet Books. ISBN 978-0-451-17454-3.
- Bego, Mark (1985). Madonna!. Pinnacle Books. ISBN 978-0-523-42576-4.
- Bego, Mark (2000). Madonna: Blonde Ambition. Cooper Square Press. ISBN 978-0-8154-1051-5.
- Bronson, Fred (2003). The Billboard Book of Number 1 Hits. Billboard Books. ISBN 978-0-8230-7677-2.
- Clerk, Carol (2012). Madonnastyle. Omnibus Press. ISBN 978-2-909828-89-3.
- Denisoff, R. Serge; Romanowski, William D. (2017). Risky Business: Rock in Film. Taylor & Francis. ISBN 978-1-4128-3337-0.
- Du Noyer, Paul, ed. (1999). The Encyclopedia of Singles. Parragon. ISBN 978-0-7525-3337-7.
- Easlea, Daryl (2012). Madonna: Blond Ambition. Backbeat Books. ISBN 978-1-61713-034-2.
- Faith, Karlene (1997). Madonna: Bawdy & Soul. University of Toronto Press. ISBN 978-0-8020-4208-8.
- Griffin, Nancy; Masters, Kim (1997). Hit and Run: How Jon Peters and Peter Guber took Sony for a ride in Hollywood. Simon & Schuster. ISBN 978-0-684-83266-1.
- Gulick, Rebecca (1993). Madonna: Portrait of a Material Girl. Bison Books. ISBN 978-1-56138-236-1.
- King, James (2018). Fast Times and Excellent Adventures: The Surprising History of the '80s Teen Movie. Little, Brown and Company. ISBN 978-1-4721-2373-2.
- Kohn, Al; Kohn, Bob (1996). Kohn on Music Licensing. Aspen Publishing. ISBN 978-1-56706-289-2.
- Koopmans, Andy (2003). Madonna. Lucent Books. ISBN 978-1-59018-138-6.
- Madden, Caroline (2024). Virginity on Screen: The First Time in American Teen Films. McFarland & Company. ISBN 978-1-4766-8500-7.
- Marsh, Dave (1999). The Heart of Rock & Soul: The 1001 Greatest Singles Ever Made. Hachette Book Group. ISBN 978-0-452-26305-5.
- McKeen, William (2000). Rock and Roll Is Here to Stay. W. W. Norton & Company. ISBN 978-0-393-04700-4.
- Morgan, Michelle (2015). Madonna. Constable & Robinson. ISBN 978-0-7624-5621-5.
- Pollock, Bruce (2005). Rock Song Index: The 7500 Most Important Songs for the Rock & Roll Era. Routledge. ISBN 978-0-415-97073-0.
- Potter, John, ed. (2000). The Cambridge Companion to Singing. Cambridge University Press. ISBN 978-0-521-62225-7.
- Randall, Lee (1992). The Madonna Scrapbook. Citadel Press. ISBN 978-0-8065-1297-6.
- Rettenmund, Matthew (1995). Encyclopedia Madonnica. St. Martin's Press. ISBN 978-0-312-11782-5.
- Rooksby, Rikky (2004). The Complete Guide to the Music of Madonna. Omnibus Press. ISBN 978-0-7119-9883-4.
- Madonna: The Rolling Stone Files. Hyperion Press. 1997. ISBN 978-0-7868-8154-3.
- Taraborrelli, Randy J. (2001). Madonna: An Intimate Biography. Simon & Schuster. ISBN 978-0-283-07289-5.
- Zaleski, Annie (2024). We Found Love, Song by Song: The Stories Behind 100 Romantic Hits. Hachette Books UK. ISBN 978-0-7624-8701-1.
