= Body Count (1998 film) =

1998 film directed by Robert Patton-Spruill

- Directed by: Robert Patton-Spruill
- Written by: Theodore Witcher
- Produced by: Mark Burg; George Jackson; Doug McHenry
- Starring: David Caruso; Linda Fiorentino; John Leguizamo; Ving Rhames; Donnie Wahlberg; Forest Whitaker
- Cinematography: Charles Mills
- Edited by: Joseph Gutowski; Richard Nord
- Music by: Curt Sobel
- Production companies: PolyGram Filmed Entertainment; Island Pictures; Mainline Pictures; Counting Bodies Productions; The Jackson/McHenry Company
- Distributed by: PolyGram Video
- Release date: April 28, 1998
- Running time: 85 minutes
- Country: United States
- Language: English

Body Count is a 1998 American crime thriller film starring David Caruso, Linda Fiorentino, John Leguizamo, Ving Rhames, Donnie Wahlberg, and Forest Whitaker. The film was directed by Robert Patton-Spruill.

In the film, a group of thieves flees after a failed heist. They encounter a con artist who has plans for them.

Body Count was released by PolyGram Video on April 28, 1998.

== Plot ==
A group of thieves attempts to rob an art gallery, but when plans backfire and one of the men winds up dead, the group head down south, running afoul of the law. Along the way, they meet up with a seductive con artist with ideas of her own.

== Cast ==
- David Caruso as Hobbs
- Linda Fiorentino as Natalie
- John Leguizamo as Chino
- Ving Rhames as Pike
- Donnie Wahlberg as Booker
- Forest Whitaker as Crane

== Production ==
During development, it had been announced in the press under the titles Framed and The Split.

== Release ==
The film was released direct to video on April 28, 1998, due to poor audience reaction at test screenings.
