= If Rock & Roll Were a Machine =

1992 young adult novel by Terry Davis

- First edition
- Author: Terry Davis
- Language: English
- Genre: Young adult novel
- Publisher: Delacorte Books (1992); Eastern Washington University Press (March 2003)
- Publication place: United States
- Media type: Print (Hardback & Paperback)
- Pages: 284 pp
- ISBN: 978-0-910055-86-4
- OCLC: 51330424
- LC Class: PZ7.D3177 If 2003
- Preceded by: Vision Quest

If Rock & Roll Were a Machine is a young adult novel written by Terry Davis. It was first published in 1992 and was re-released in a new edition in March 2003. Despite its title, it has little to do with machines and less to do with rock and roll: it primarily focuses on the central character's coming of age through the sport of racquetball.

== Plot summary ==
Albert "Bert" Bowen, a high school junior, is still suffering from the lack of self-esteem he developed following criticism from his fifth-grade teacher. However, a developing interest in writing and racquetball and a new motorcycle, as well as support from understanding adults, help him discover who he really is.

The novel is set in the same high school as Vision Quest, but twenty years later.

== Awards ==
- New York Public Library Best Books for the Teen Age, 1994
- ALA Best Books for Young Adults, 1993
- New York Public Library Best Books for the Teen Age, 1993
