= Charlie's Ghost Story =

- Directed by: Anthony Edwards
- Written by: Lance W. Dreesen; Clint Hutchison
- Produced by: Barry L. Collier; Steven Paul
- Starring: Cheech Marin
- Cinematography: Samuel Ameen
- Music by: Jim Kremens
- Release date: 1995
- Language: English

Charlie's Ghost Story, also known as Charlie's Ghost: The Secret of Coronado, is a 1995 American adventure-comedy film directed by Anthony Edwards, at his directorial debut. Based on a story by Mark Twain, it stars Cheech Marin, Trenton Knight, Anthony Edwards and Linda Fiorentino.

== Plot ==
An archaeologist finds remains of a famous explorer and moves them to a museum. This causes the spirit of the explorer to become restless. He wants his bones properly buried and returns as a ghost to seek help from a 12-year-old boy named Charlie.

== Cast ==
- Cheech Marin as Coronado
- Trenton Knight as Charlie
- Anthony Edwards as Dave
- Linda Fiorentino as Marta
- Charles Rocket as Van Leer
- Daphne Zuniga as Ronda
- Robert Hy Gorman as Tuggle
- Veronica Lauren as Ncki
- J. T. Walsh as Darryl
- Dean Cameron as Sheriff
- Bethany Richards as Terri
- Stephen Kearney as Mover
