= Harold Becker =

American film director (born 1928)

- Born: September 25, 1928 (age 98); New York City, New York, U.S.
- Education: Pratt Institute
- Occupations: Film director, film producer, photographer

Harold Becker (born September 25, 1928) is an American filmmaker and photographer, associated with the New Hollywood movement and best known for his work in the thriller genre. His films include The Onion Field, Taps, The Boost, Sea of Love, Malice, City Hall, and Mercury Rising.

== Life and career ==
After studying art and photography at the Pratt Institute, Becker began his career as a still photographer, but later tried his hand at directing television commercials, short films and documentaries. He won the Mannheim-Heidelberg International Film Festival Gold Prize for his documentary Ivanhoe Donaldson in 1964.

Becker made his feature film debut in 1972 when he directed The Ragman's Daughter.

In 2025, Becker released his memoir, Catching the Light.

== Filmography ==
=== Film ===
Year	Title	Functioned as		Notes
Year	Title	Director	Producer	Notes
1964	Ivanhoe Donaldson	Yes	No	Documentary
1967	Blind Gary Davis	Yes	No	Documentary short
1967	Sighet, Sighet	Yes	No	Documentary short
1972	The Ragman's Daughter	Yes	Yes	
1979	The Onion Field	Yes	No	
1980	The Black Marble	Yes	No	
1981	Taps	Yes	No	
1985	Vision Quest	Yes	No	
1987	The Big Town	Yes	No	Uncredited; replaced during filming by Ben Bolt
1988	The Boost	Yes	Co-executive	
1989	Sea of Love	Yes	No	
1993	Malice	Yes	Yes	
1996	City Hall	Yes	Yes	
1998	Mercury Rising	Yes	No	
2001	Domestic Disturbance	Yes	Yes	

==== Executive producer only ====
- Vengeance: A Love Story (2017)

=== Television ===
Year	Title	Episode
2007	Masters of Science Fiction	"Watchbird"

=== Music video ===
Year	Title	Artist
1985	"Crazy for You"	Madonna
1985	"Gambler"	Madonna

== Awards and nominations ==
Institution	Year	Category	Work	Result
Festival du Film Policier de Cognac	1994	Best Director	Malice	Won
Festival du Film Policier de Cognac	1994	Audience Award	Malice	Won
