= Vision Quest (film) =

1985 film by Harold Becker

- Theatrical release poster
- Directed by: Harold Becker
- Screenplay by: Darryl Ponicsan
- Based on: Vision Quest by Terry Davis
- Produced by: Jon Peters; Peter Guber
- Starring: Matthew Modine; Linda Fiorentino; Michael Schoeffling
- Cinematography: Owen Roizman
- Edited by: Maury Winetrobe
- Music by: Tangerine Dream
- Production company: Guber Peters Company
- Distributed by: Warner Bros.
- Release date: February 15, 1985
- Running time: 107 minutes
- Country: United States
- Language: English
- Box office: $13 million (US)

Vision Quest (released in the United Kingdom and Australia as Crazy for You) is a 1985 American coming-of-age romantic drama/sports film starring Matthew Modine, Michael Schoeffling, Ronny Cox and Linda Fiorentino in her first film role. It is based on Terry Davis's 1979 novel of the same name.

Modine plays a Spokane high school wrestler who falls in love with an older woman, an aspiring artist from Trenton, New Jersey, on her way to San Francisco.

The film includes the first major motion picture appearance by Madonna, who plays a singer at a local bar, where she performs the songs "Crazy for You" and "Gambler". In some countries, the title of the film was changed to "Crazy for You" to capitalize on Madonna's emerging fame and the popularity of her song of that name. The film has become a cult classic.

== Plot ==
Louden Swain is a wrestler at Thompson High School who has just turned 18 years old. He has decided that he needs to do something truly meaningful in his life. He embarks on a mission or, in a Native American term, a vision quest. His goal is to drop two weight classes to challenge the area's toughest opponent, Brian Shute, a menacing three-time state champion from nearby rival Hoover High School, who has never been defeated in his high school career. In his zeal to drop from 190 pounds (86 kilograms) to 168 pounds (76 kg), against the wishes of his coach and teammates, he disrupts the team around him and creates health problems of his own.

Meanwhile, his father has taken on a boarder named Carla from Trenton, New Jersey, who is passing through on her way to San Francisco. Louden falls in love with her and begins to lose sight of his goals as a wrestler. Worse, his drastic weight loss culminates in an unhealthy situation, where he gets frequent nosebleeds which, Louden assumes, is due to a lack of iron in his diet (and results in him having to forfeit a match he was winning). The two finally admit their love for each other, but Carla realizes she is distracting him from his goals.

Carla decides to move out and continue on to San Francisco, but not before seeing Louden's big match, in which he makes a comeback from losing and pins Shute in the final seconds with an O-Goshi (over-under hip toss).

As Louden celebrates his victory, he monologues to the audience "...I guess that's why we got to love those people who deserve it like there's no tomorrow. 'Cause when you get right down to it—there isn't."

== Cast ==
- Matthew Modine as Louden Swain
- Linda Fiorentino as Carla
- Michael Schoeffling as Kenny "Kuch" Kuchera
- Ronny Cox as Larry Swain
- Frank Jasper as Brian Shute
- Harold Sylvester as Gene Tanneran
- Daphne Zuniga as Margie Epstein
- Charles Hallahan as Coach Ratta
- J.C. Quinn as Elmo
- R.H. Thomson as Kevin
- Gary Kasper as Otto Lafte
- Raphael Sbarge as Kenny Schmoozler
- Forest Whitaker as Jean-Pierre "Balldozer" Baldosier
- Roberts Blossom as Harry Swain
- James Gammon as Mr. Kuchera
- Madonna as Club Singer
- Ken Pelo as Coach Charlie Swann
- Jana Marie Hupp as Sally
- Andrew Shue as Bar Patron
- Pat Brown as Wrestler (Extra)

== Production ==
Production took place in Spokane, Washington, in the fall of 1983. The film was shot at Rogers High School in northeast Spokane, referred to as "Thompson High School" in the film. Interior cafeteria scenes were filmed at Ferris High School on Spokane's South Hill. Some of the locker room scenes were filmed in the boys' locker room of Shadle Park High School in northwest Spokane. Madonna's scene was filmed at the Big Foot Tavern on North Division Street in Spokane. Other scenes were shot at The Onion Restaurant downtown and the North Central High School gym. The scene where Louden's big match happens was shot in the gym at Spokane Falls Community College.

== Reception ==
The film had moderate success in theaters in the U.S. in 1985, earning a gross of $13 million. On the review aggregator website Rotten Tomatoes, 63% of 16 critics' reviews are positive, with an average rating of 5.6/10. Metacritic, which uses a weighted average, assigned the film a score of 55 out of 100, based on 12 critics, indicating "mixed or average" reviews. The film has gone on to become a cult classic.

Roger Ebert of Chicago Sun-Times gave the film 3.5 stars out of a possible 4, saying while the core storyline was a formulaic sports drama "it is nevertheless a movie with some nice surprises, mostly because it takes the time to create some interesting characters", with standout performances from Modine, Cox, and Fiorentino.

== Soundtrack ==
The soundtrack to the motion picture was released by Geffen Records on February 12, 1985. The soundtrack does not include "No More Words" by Berlin or tracks from REO Speedwagon and Quarterflash, which appear in the film. The background instrumental music by Tangerine Dream is not included, but was later released on the fan project Tangerine Tree 73: Soundtrax.

=== Reception ===
Professional ratings
Review scores
Source	Rating
AllMusic	4/5 stars
Singapore Monitor	2/4 stars

The soundtrack received generally positive feedback from music journalists. Singapore Monitor called the album a "very timely collection by some of the bigger up-and-coming names in today's pop and rock scene". Similarly, Rick Shefchik, in his review for Knight Ridder, named the release as "the best soundtrack album in the racks these days". Brian Chin from Billboard complimented Madonna's songs on the soundtrack. The album charted in Australia, Canada, and the United States. Upon release, Jeff Bunch from The Spokesman-Review named it one of the "best examples of profitable soundtracks" of unsuccessful movies. The home video release also peaked at number five on Cash Box's Top 40 Videocassettes. Vision Quest ended as one of the Top 50 Albums and Top Soundtracks on Cash Box's Pop Album Awards. The album was included among Yardbarker's list of the 25 Best Soundtracks From the 1980s. In 2024, the soundtrack was included in Rolling Stone's list of the 101 Greatest Soundtracks of All Time.

=== Impact ===
Madonna performing "Crazy for You" during her Celebration Tour in 2023.

The movie was renamed Crazy for You in New Zealand, Australia and the UK after the Madonna song "Crazy for You" to capitalize on the growing fame of the still-on-the-rise singer. Cashbox's Julius Robinson retrospectively commented in 1988, that the song "really put her on the map".

Writing for Cashbox in 1985, Peter Berk explained the film "offered a valuable lesson to the industry", showing "how much a hit song can do to promote an otherwise soon-to-be forgotten movie". He continued, writing that, although Journey's "Only The Young" drew attention to the album, Madonna's "Crazy for You" made the soundtrack "so magnetic to record buyers". He complimented that films like Vision Quest have "made many people aware of just how invaluable the film-music connection is today". In December 1987, Billboard magazine dedicated an article to the links between a movie and a hit single and music videos. In July 1985, Jan DeKnock from Chicago Tribune noted what he called a "movie mania", when various singles from motion pictures reached the first spot in the U.S. Billboard Hot 100 that year, beginning with "Crazy for You". It was the first song produced by John Benitez to climb to the U.S. charts, breaking the nine-week streak of "We Are the World". Australian music editor Marc Andrews, in Madonna Song by Song (2022), wrote that "Crazy for You" is now "considered one of the greatest, if not sexiest, love songs of all time". Len Comaratta, from Consequence, called it "a classic in the rock ballad canon". According to Billboard, "Crazy for You" is one of all-time biggest movie songs on the Billboard Hot 100. The Arizona Republic picked it as one of the Best 10 Madonna songs From movie soundtracks.

=== Track listing ===
No.	Title	Writer(s)	Performer	Length
1.	"Only the Young"	Jonathan Cain; Steve Perry; Neal Schon	Journey	4:01
2.	"Change"	Holly Knight	John Waite	3:14
3.	"Shout to the Top!"	Paul Weller	The Style Council	4:18
4.	"Gambler"	Madonna	Madonna	3:54
5.	"She's On the Zoom"	Don Henley; Danny Kortchmar	Don Henley	3:18
6.	"Hungry for Heaven"	Jimmy Bain; Ronnie James Dio	Dio	4:12
7.	"Lunatic Fringe"	Tom Cochrane	Red Rider	4:20
8.	"I'll Fall in Love Again"	Sammy Hagar	Sammy Hagar	4:11
9.	"Hot Blooded"	Lou Gramm; Mick Jones	Foreigner	4:24
10.	"Crazy for You"	John Bettis; Jon Lind	Madonna	4:08
Total length:				40:24

=== Charts ===
Chart (1985)	Peak position
Australian Albums (ARIA)	46
Canada Top Albums/CDs (RPM)	42
US Billboard 200	11
US Top 100 Albums (Cash Box)	30

=== Certifications ===
Region	Certification	Certified units/sales
United States (RIAA)	Platinum	1,000,000^{^}
^{^} Shipments figures based on certification alone.
