= Vision Quest (novel) =

1979 young adult novel by Terry Davis

- First edition
- Author: Terry Davis
- Language: English
- Genre: Young Adult
- Publisher: Delacorte Books
- Publication date: 1979
- Publication place: United States
- Media type: Print (Hardback & Paperback)
- Pages: 256 pp
- ISBN: 978-0-385-73274-1
- OCLC: 55960931
- Followed by: If Rock & Roll Were a Machine

Vision Quest is a young adult novel by Terry Davis, published in 1979. In first-person, present-tense narrative, it tells the story of a few months in the life of Louden Swain, a high school wrestler in Spokane, Washington who is cutting weight and working toward the state championships. The book takes its title from the vision quest ritual of some Native American tribes, of going into the wilderness alone to "discover who you are and who your people are and how you fit into the circle of birth and growth and death and rebirth." John Irving called it "the truest novel about growing up since The Catcher in the Rye."

Vision Quest was made into a 1985 film of the same title, starring Matthew Modine and Linda Fiorentino, with a cameo appearance from Madonna as a night-club singer.

The book has been published in many different editions, including re-releases in May 2002 (with a foreword by Chris Crutcher) and May 2005.

== Critical reception ==
Kirkus Reviews called Vision Quest "a sunny and deft novel for lovers of wrestling, wit, and hang-loose talent."

== Awards and nominations ==
- Vision Quest - ALA Best Books for Young Adults, 1980
- Vision Quest - New York Public Library Best Books for the Teen Age, 1980
- Vision Quest - ALA Best Books for Young Adults In the Last Quarter Century, 1995
