= Terry Davis (author) =

American novelist (born 1946)

- Born: 1946 (age 79–80); Spokane, Washington, U.S.
- Education: Eastern Washington University
- Occupations: Novelist; columnist; screenwriter; professor
- Writing career
- Genres: Fiction, Young Adult
- Website: writerterrydavis.com

Terry Davis (born 1946) is an American novelist. He was born in, and lived near Spokane, Washington, for many years, and is a professor emeritus of English at Minnesota State University, Mankato (MSU Mankato), where he taught creative writing – fiction and screenwriting – as well as adolescent literature. Davis, who has been a high school English teacher and a wrestling coach, is the author of three novels for young adults: Vision Quest (1979), Mysterious Ways (1984), and If Rock & Roll Were a Machine (1992). He has also written Presenting Chris Crutcher, a biography of the eponym young-adult author.

John Irving called Vision Quest "the truest novel about growing up since Catcher in the Rye," and said, "it's a better novel about wrestling, and wrestlers, than The World According to Garp."

Vision Quest was made into a 1985 movie of the same title, starring Matthew Modine and Linda Fiorentino.

== Early life ==
Terry Davis was born and raised in Spokane. The son of a housewife and a sales executive, Davis excelled at Shadle Park High School as a wrestler and basketball player, then studied English at Eastern Washington University where he met fellow student Chris Crutcher – a year his senior.

Davis went from Eastern to study under John Irving at the University of Iowa's Writers' Workshop, and later at Stanford University as a Wallace Stegner Literary Fellow. It was here that the novel Vision Quest began to take shape.

== Recent years ==
Davis is a motorcycle aficionado, riding Norton and Yamaha bikes, and they play a role in much of his writing. He opened Terry Davis' Clandestine Classic Cycles in Rapidan, Minnesota in 2007. He continues to teach and write, including a current project about a man's struggle with clinical depression after his girlfriend gets addicted to online poker and is sent back to her homeland in Africa.

== Awards ==
- Vision Quest - ALA Best Books for Young Adults, 1980
- Vision Quest - New York Public Library Best Books for the Teen Age, 1980
- If Rock & Roll Were a Machine - ALA Best Books for Young Adults, 1993
- If Rock & Roll Were a Machine - New York Public Library Best Books for the Teen Age, 1993
- If Rock & Roll Were a Machine - New York Public Library Best Books for the Teen Age, 1994
- Vision Quest - ALA Best Books for Young Adults In the Last Quarter Century, 1995
