= Carol Clerk =

British music journalist

- Born: 15 October 1954; Belfast
- Died: 13 March 2010 (age 55)
- Occupations: Writer, journalist

Carol Elizabeth Clerk (15 October 1954 – 13 March 2010) was a British music journalist and author.

Clerk was from Belfast, the daughter of a geography teacher. She moved to London as a young woman, and had an album review column in the Hammersmith and Shepherds Bush Gazette in the late 1970s. She joined the staff of Melody Maker in 1980. She was the news editor of Melody Maker until the newspaper ceased publication in 1999. She was remembered as "tiny, tireless, straight-up, no-bullshit, no-backstabbing Carol; flaming hair, permanent fag and loud laughing Northern Irish rattle and rasp."

In 1985, Clerk won journalist of the year from the Professional Publishers Association for her coverage of the Live Aid benefit concert at Wembley Stadium. She had a reputation for toughness and hard-drinking, but also for being a good reporter and writer. "The worst band I ever had to deal with was Wham!" she told a newspaper in 1988. "They were uncooperative, awkward and very arrogant and I never want to set eyes on those two again."

== Books ==
Clerk's first book, published in 1987, was about The Damned. She worked on several book projects about the Kray brothers in the 1990s. She wrote more books after her time at Melody Maker, on Madonna, Hawkwind, Ozzy Osbourne, the history of tattoos, Paula Yates, and the Pogues. A collection of her writings about Nirvana was published posthumously, in 2012.

- Nirvana: Uncensored on the Record (2012)
- Vintage Tattoos (2008)
- Pogue Mahone: Kiss My Arse (2006)
- The Saga of Hawkwind (2004)
- Hughie and Paula (2003, with Christopher Green)
- Madonna Style (2002)
- Diary of a Madman: Ozzy Osbourne: The Stories Behind the Songs (2002)
- Getting It Straight: Villains Talking (2001, with Tony Lambrianou and Freddie Foreman )
- Inside the Firm: the Untold Story of the Krays' Reign of Terror (1991, with Tony Lambrianou and Freddie Foreman )
- Reggie Kray's autobiography, Born Fighter (1990) (ghostwriter)
- The Book of the Damned: The Light at the End of the Tunnel (1987)

== Personal life and legacy ==
Clerk walked with a cane, because her gait was affected by a congenital hip problem. She married graphic designer Nigel O'Brien in 1993; they had a daughter, Eve, and moved to Kent in 2005. Clerk died from breast cancer in 2010, at the age of 55. In 2015, 215 letters sent to Clerk by Reggie Kray were sold at auction. In 2022, The Carol Clerk Bursary was founded to support emerging music journalists with connections to Northern Ireland.
