= Robert A. Daly =

American business executive

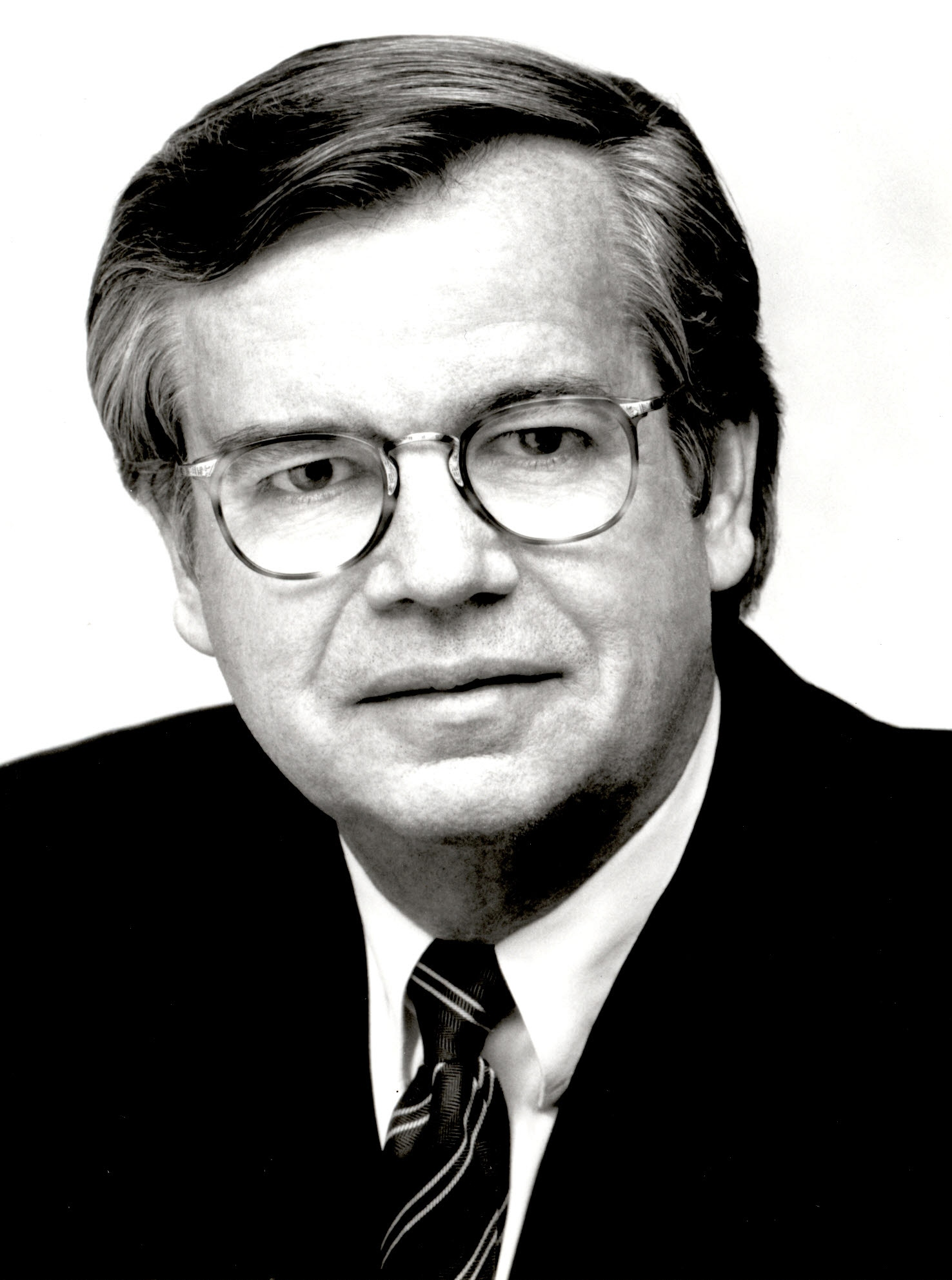
- Born: Robert Anthony Daly; December 8, 1936 (age 89); Brooklyn, New York City, U.S.
- Occupation: Business executive
- Spouses: Nancy MacNeil (m. 1961; div. 1991); Carole Bayer Sager (m. 1996)
- Children: 3

Robert Anthony Daly (born December 8, 1936) is an American business executive who has led organizations such as CBS Entertainment, Warner Bros., Warner Music Group, and the Los Angeles Dodgers.

Daly currently serves as a non-executive advisor to Paramount Pictures, where he provides counsel on a number of strategic areas.

Daly also serves as Chair of the Board of Directors for the American Film Institute, an organization he has been involved with for many years. Additionally, he is a member of the Academy of Motion Picture Arts and Sciences, the UCLA School of Theater, Film and Television’s Dean’s Advisory Board and the UCLA Executive Board for the Medical Sciences. In 2006, he joined the board of the USC Annenberg School for Communication.

Daly completed his term as chairman of the board of trustees for the children's charity Save the Children in February 2010.

In addition, Daly serves as president of Rulemaker, Inc., an investment consulting company. He is also chairman of DonorsChoose.org, an organization which provides material assistance to teachers in the public school system.

Daly is also a Founding Director of the Geffen Playhouse.

== Biography ==
=== Early life ===
Daly was born and grew up Brooklyn, New York City, the youngest of six children. Daly attended his first Dodgers game when he was six years old and has stated that the '55 Dodgers are his favorite team and Jackie Robinson is his hero. After graduating high school, Daly applied for a job as an office boy at CBS to help support his mother and soon after got promoted but left CBS when he was drafted into the United States Army in which he described as "When I was in the Army, they had theaters on the base and, for some reason or other, I went to the movies any time I could go, and I took notes. I don’t know why. It wasn’t my job at CBS; I just took notes." After leaving the army, Daly returned to CBS.

=== Education and career at CBS ===
Robert A. Daly attended Brooklyn College and Hunter College. He received an Honorary Doctorate of Fine Arts from the American Film Institute, as well as a Doctorate of Humane Letters from Trinity College (Connecticut). Daly began as a gofer for the Columbia Broadcasting System in 1955, before beginning a career path to "president of entertainment". In addition to his duties as chief of television operations at CBS, Daly was also responsible for CBS Theatrical Films, which was formed in October 1979. During his 25-year association with CBS, Daly served in various posts, including executive vice president of CBS Television Network and vice president of business affairs.

=== Warner Bros. ===
Having left CBS, he joined Warner Bros. on December 1, 1980. His titles were chairman of the board and co-chief executive officer. One year later, he was named chairman of the board and chief executive officer and appointed Terry Semel president and chief operating officer. Daly resumed his previous title on March 30, 1994, when he announced he would share his office with Semel. On November 16, 1995, Daly and Semel added the Warner Music Group to their responsibilities and also became chairmen and co-chief executive officers of Warner Music Group. On July 15, 1999, Daly and Semel announced they would not seek to renew their contracts with Time Warner (the parent company of Warner Bros. and the parent company at the time of the Warner Music Group), which expired at the end of 1999.

During the Daly/Semel era at Warner Bros., they were credited for 16 consecutive years of record earnings; for more than 400 major motion pictures (that garnered 13 Best Picture Oscar nominations, three of which were winners: Chariots of Fire, Driving Miss Daisy and Unforgiven); for thousands of hours of television series (including China Beach, Murphy Brown, Friends and ER); for creating the current model of co-financing motion pictures while retaining worldwide distribution; and for extending brands as Batman, Superman and Looney Tunes characters into franchises. Other accomplishments by Daly and Semel include developing the distribution operations in the world for feature films, television and home video as well as the emerging technologies; pioneering the creation and use of DVD and creating The WB Network.

Daly and Semel and their partnership were immortalized on September 30, 1999, as the pair put their hands and footprints in the same cement square in the forecourt of Grauman's Chinese Theatre, only the second studio executives in history to do so.

However, some people felt the two had been stretched too far in trying to oversee such a massive conglomerate. In a 1997 interview that Mr. Daly gave for the New York Times it is said "Mr. Daly brushed aside the notion that he and Mr. Semel are stretched too thin. 'If we were, we wouldn't have taken the job...'[.]"

=== Los Angeles Dodgers ===
Daly went to the Los Angeles Dodgers baseball organization after 19 years at Warner Bros. He served as managing partner, chairman and chief executive officer of the Los Angeles Dodgers, overseeing all operations of the organization during the time they were owned by News Corp. During the four year period Daly ran the organization, he took great pride in rebuilding the farm system. Daly and his partners sold the team in 2004, and he remains a fan.

=== Save The Children ===
Daly completed his term as chairman of the board of trustees for Save the Children on February 28, 2010. In his five years as Board Chair, he oversaw annual program growth averaging 13.5 percent, serving 48 million children in 2008. He also spearheaded the creation of Save the Children's first domestic response unit in the United States, which has proven successful in responding to disasters such as Hurricane Katrina, Gustave and Ike. In his final months as chairman, Daly was actively involved in the Haitian earthquake relief effort.

=== Personal life ===
Daly's first marriage was to philanthropist and arts dealer Nancy MacNeil, but the couple divorced in 1991. MacNeil died in 2009 at the age of 68. Daly married lyricist Carole Bayer Sager in 1996. The couple live in Los Angeles. Daly also owns a ranch where he raises chickens, sheep, goats, miniature horses and plants tomatoes. Daly has three children from his marriage with MacNeil, a stepson with Bayer Sager and eight grandchildren.

Preceded by Peter O'Malley	Chairman of the Los Angeles Dodgers; 1999–2004	Succeeded by Frank McCourt
