= Linda Fiorentino =

American actress (born 1958)

- Born: Clorinda Fiorentino; March 9, 1958 (age 68); Philadelphia, Pennsylvania, U.S.
- Education: Rosemont College (BA)
- Occupations: Actress; photographer
- Years active: 1984–2009
- Known for: The Last Seduction (1994); Men in Black (1997); Dogma (1999)
- Spouse: John Byrum (m. 1992; div. 1993)

Clorinda "Linda" Fiorentino (born March 9, 1958) (Note: Several sources have also incorrectly given 1960 as her year of birth.) is a retired American actress. Fiorentino made her screen debut with a leading role in the 1985 coming-of-age drama film Vision Quest, followed that same year with another lead role in the action film Gotcha! and an appearance in the Martin Scorsese film After Hours. Noted for her "raven hair, intense gaze and low voice", Fiorentino was placed No. 66 on the 1995 edition of Empire's list of the 100 Sexiest Stars in Film History by a reader's poll.

For her performance in the 1994 film The Last Seduction, she won the New York Film Critics Circle Award for Best Actress, the London Film Critics' Circle Award for Actress of the Year, the Independent Spirit Award for Best Female Lead, and was nominated for the BAFTA Award for Best Actress in a Leading Role. She also had leading roles in the erotic thriller Jade (1995), the science fiction action comedy film Men in Black (1997) and the fantasy comedy Dogma (1999).

== Early life and education ==
Fiorentino was born the third of eight children in an Italian-American family in South Philadelphia. One of her sisters is model and photographer Donya Fiorentino, who had been married to filmmaker David Fincher and British actor Gary Oldman. Fiorentino's parents—a steel contractor and a housewife—raised her in South Philadelphia, and later moved the family to the Turnersville section of Washington Township in nearby South Jersey. Fiorentino was a "bright student" at school but was also rebellious and would "argue with the nuns about the Bible and they seemed to love it." Fiorentino's mother later said, "Linda has a great facade. She comes off as very bold, but she's really very shy."

In 1976, Fiorentino graduated from Washington Township High School in Sewell, New Jersey, where she excelled in basketball, baseball and cheerleading. She began performing in plays at Rosemont College in suburban Philadelphia after falling in with a crowd of "rich Puerto Ricans and Cubans" and found herself in plays because "everyone in the theater there was really weird." She graduated in 1980 with a Bachelor of Arts degree in political science. After graduation, Fiorentino planned to continue her education at law school, but one of her professors convinced her to pursue a career in acting. She trained at the Circle in the Square Theater School in Manhattan while working as a bartender at the nightclub Kamikaze, where Bruce Willis also worked. Fiorentino has also been an active photographer since 1987 and studied at the International Center of Photography in New York City.

== Career ==
=== Early career and breakthrough ===
Fiorentino landed her first professional role after her first professional audition in 1985 when she was cast in Vision Quest (1985) as Carla, the romantic partner of the lead character, a high school wrestler played by Matthew Modine. Fiorentino beat out Rebecca de Mornay, Rosanna Arquette and Demi Moore for the role. The film was a moderate success in theaters but has gone on to become a cult classic. Film critic Roger Ebert said of the newcomer, "Without having met the actress, it's impossible for me to speculate on how much of Carla is original work and how much is Fiorentino's personality. What comes across, though, is a woman who is enigmatic without being egotistical, detached without being cold, self-reliant without being suspicious. She has a way of talking – kind of deliberately objective – that makes you listen to everything she says."

Due to her "cinematic combination of spunk and sexiness", "a considerable amount of heat" was generated in Fiorentino's early career. Subsequently, she was approached by both Tom Cruise and director Tony Scott for the role of Charlotte "Charlie" Blackwood (Cruise's character's love interest) in Top Gun. Despite getting along with Cruise and recognising the film's commercial potential, Fiorentino declined, objecting to the film's "pro-military stance". The role was then given to Kelly McGillis.

In 1985, she starred in the espionage comedy film Gotcha!, which was filmed in Los Angeles, Paris and Berlin. Her co-star, Anthony Edwards, later directed her in Charlie's Ghost Story. Giving the film two stars out of four, Roger Ebert of the Chicago Sun-Times described the European sequences as "a well-directed cat-and-mouse game" that lost its way in the final act after returning to the United States, with the film's main flaw being a focus on Edwards' character when Fiorentino was far more intriguing: "I'll bet the men who made this movie just assumed it had to be told from his point of view, and never considered hers. Too bad. I think they missed their best chance." Fiorentino spoke negatively of the film saying, "It's not my kind of film," and, "These kinds of movies are like drinking beer all the time."

For the rest of the mid-to-late 1980s, she appeared as a downtown artist in Martin Scorsese's After Hours (1985) and as the wife of an art collector in 1920's Paris in Alan Rudolph's The Moderns (1988). After Hours was critically acclaimed for its black humor, and is considered to be an underrated Scorsese film. Roger Ebert gave After Hours a rating of four out of four stars and added the film to his "Great Movies" list. In its review of The Moderns, Variety wrote: "Fiorentino is ideal as the gorgeous American of a prosaic background over whom men may lose their hearts, mind and lives."

After her initial career successes, Fiorentino's acting career stagnated, although she continued to appear in erotic films such as Wildfire (1988) and Chain of Desire (1992), where she often portrayed "dominating, manipulative characters". In the early-1990s, director Paul Verhoeven invited Fiorentino to have a supporting role in Basic Instinct (eventually played by Jeanne Tripplehorn). However, Fiorentino wanted the lead role of Catherine Tramell (later played by Sharon Stone), although she was rebuffed due to having "breasts that were too small."

=== The Last Seduction and critical acclaim ===
Fiorentino experienced a resurgence after she received accolades for her performance in director John Dahl's 1994 neo-noir film The Last Seduction, playing the murderous Bridget. Dahl told The New York Times that when he began trying to cast the role of Bridget, most of the actresses thought the character was too despicable to be appealing. "But Linda saw the potential in the part and recognized it as something that she could have a lot of fun with," he said.

The New York Times described Fiorentino as "a sleek seductress who, like the femmes fatale of [Barbara] Stanwyck's day, will stop at nothing to get her way." After coldheartedly double-crossing her husband (Bill Pullman) in a drug deal, Bridget heads to an upstate New York town where she goes by "Wendy" and involves Mike (Peter Berg), a gullible local, in a murderous scheme. Fiorentino improvised a scene in which her character and Berg's character have sex against a chain-link fence behind the bar they just met in. "I was just trying to keep up with her at that point," Berg said in an interview.

The Last Seduction has gained a cult following, and the character Bridget Gregory has been recognized as one of the most iconic femmes fatale in film history. Fiorentino said of accepting the role, "After I read that script, I was in Arizona and I got in a car and drove six hours to get to the meeting because I had never read anything so unique in terms of a female character. And I walked in the meeting with John Dahl, the director, and I said, 'John, you are not allowed to hire anyone but me for this film.' And I wasn't kidding."

In its review of the film, The New York Times called Fiorentino's performance "flawlessly hard-boiled." After seeing Fiorentino in the part, Christopher Tookey, the film critic at The London Daily Mail, wrote: "The role could easily have been a misogynistic fantasy-woman. But Fiorentino makes you believe in her. I doubt if there will be a more stunning female performance this year."

Roger Ebert, in his four-star review of the film, wrote that Fiorentino "has a quality about her ... In VisionQuest (1985), a silly wrestling movie, there was nothing silly about her scenes. In Martin Scorsese's After Hours, she was the black widow waiting in the net that the hapless hero stumbled into. What's crucial is that she plays these roles with relish: She seems to enjoy the freedom a script like The Last Seduction gives her, and the result is a movie that is not only ingenious and entertaining, but liberating, because we can sense the story isn't going to be twisted into conformity with some stupid formula."

Her performance won Fiorentino the New York Film Critics Circle Award for Best Actress, the Independent Spirit Award for Best Female Lead, and the London Film Critics' Circle Award for Actress of the Year, and was nominated for the BAFTA Award for Best Actress in a Leading Role. Despite the critical acclaim, because the film was shown on television prior to its cinematic release, Fiorentino was ineligible for an Oscar nomination.

=== Hollywood ===
In a 1994 appearance on Late Show with David Letterman, Fiorentino said she chose to stop acting for a period of time after Warner Bros. executive Mark Canton told her during the filming of Vision Quest, "you have a great ass, but I think your jeans need to be tighter." She said she returned to acting later to pay off mounting credit card debt.

The same year when asked about her newfound fame, and what she would do if she could never act again, Fiorentino told The New York Times: "You mean I don't have to wake up at 5 in the morning and put makeup on? I would be totally fine; I would do something else." She added she did not have a "driving passion to stay on top. [...] I'd rather be a little more subdued and aloof in my life." In a 1985 interview, she also said, "Acting is something you do when you can't make up your mind what to do. It really just kind of snuck up on me."

After The Last Seduction Fiorentino next appeared as another femme fatale (Anna Katrina Maxwell-Gavin) in the 1995 erotic thriller Jade. Fiorentino originally turned the role down because she did not want to play a prostitute, but changed her mind once her character was changed through rewrites. The film was a critical and box-office failure. Janet Maslin of The New York Times wrote: "Though the combination of Linda Fiorentino, Chazz Palminteri and David Caruso promised Jade some fire, it winds up with no more spark than a doused campfire."

Co-star Michael Biehn was not fond of the film: "Well, on Jade, I had no idea what I was doing. I don't think anybody had any idea what they were doing. It was a Joe Eszterhas script. To me, none of it ever really made any sense. I didn't realize until the read-through that I was the bad guy in it. It was like a jumbled mess. And the movie came out a mess, too. It had great people on it, though. It had William Friedkin directing, it had Chazz Palmenteri, who was nominated that year for an Academy Award, it had Linda Fiorentino, who had just come out with that famous movie she did The Last Seduction, and it had David Caruso, who's a brilliant actor when given the right material, and a very smart guy. So a great cast, great director... everything but a script."

In the book Unlikeable Female Characters: The Women Pop Culture Wants You To Hate, author Anna Bogutskaya mentions Fiorentino's character as meeting criteria for multiple archetypes of negatively portrayed women in popular media. Bogutskaya suggests that the characterization of Katrina / Jade contributed to her perception as hard to work with, referencing her personality conflict with Tommy Lee Jones in Men in Black, and ultimately culminating in her gradual exit from acting.

She later worked again with Dahl on his film Unforgettable (1996). Dahl's follow up to The Last Seduction, Unforgettable was another critical and box-office failure for Fiorentino, only earning less than $3 million in the United States. Reviewer Bryant Frazer gave the film a C− and wrote, "Liotta and Fiorentino look kind of sleepy throughout the whole proceeding ... but still, it has its moments, including the very ending, that really work—as if somewhere, buried inside this mess, there's a good movie trying to get out."

=== Men in Black, Dogma and later career ===
Fiorentino played the female lead, Dr. Laurel Weaver, in the 1997 film Men in Black, for which she was nominated for a Blockbuster Entertainment's Award for Favorite Supporting Actress in Science Fiction. She appeared alongside Ving Rhames, John Leguizamo and David Caruso in the 1998 direct-to-video film Body Count, which Variety called "an after-the-heist road movie that sizzles here and there but ends up going no place special." In 1999, she starred in Dogma as abortion clinic employee Bethany Sloane who is tasked with saving the world.

In years following, it was rumored Fiorentino did not get along with Dogma director Kevin Smith, which generated negative press for her. In an interview with TV Guide in 2000, Smith stated, "Linda created crisis and trauma and anguish. She created drama while we were making a comedy. She was ticked off that there were other people in the movie who were more famous than she was." He also accused Fiorentino of avoiding promotional duties after "going nuts" at the film's poster, which had spliced her head onto another woman's body and amplified her cleavage. "She never did a photo shoot," Smith said. "It's not like we were hinging on all that Fiorentino press – I fought to cast the woman in the movie."

However, in 2018, Smith stated that rumors of a falling out between the two had been misconstrued and overstated, and that while the two had not spoken in years, they amicably reconnected following his near-fatal heart attack. Blaming himself, Smith attributed the rumors to a remark he had made on the film's commentary track, which had later been sensationalized:

I remember on a commentary track on the DVD — Janeane Garofalo was in the movie and at one point I said it would have been better if she played the lead, which was a really shitty and stupid thing to say. Thoughtless, considering that Linda was the lead and Linda did a great job. So, it had been years since I had spoken with Linda and I got an email from her. And of course, I was thankful to hear from her and it also gave me a chance to say I'm so sorry that I ever said that thing years ago. It gives you a chance to make amends. So that was my favorite one. I heard from so many people, but that one really stood out for me because, if somebody had said, 'Oh, the movie would have been better if [co-star] Ben Affleck directed it,' that would have hurt my feelings. I know it hurt her feelings and really unnecessarily because I always loved her performance in the movie.

After a co-starring role with Paul Newman in the 2000 heist film Where the Money Is, and a lead role in the 2002 film Liberty Stands Still, Fiorentino's career slowed to a halt. She was in talks to star in a series being prepared by Tom Fontana, but did not take the project. Fiorentino was attached to a Georgia O'Keeffe biographical drama called Till the End of Time, but the project stalled when Fiorentino had a falling out with German producer Karel Dirka regarding provocative sex scenes. "You have rights, as an artist and as a woman," she said. "It's not as if I didn't agree to do some nudity. But they crossed the line. It was a question of integrity."

Fiorentino's character was written out of Men in Black II (2002) to accommodate the return of Tommy Lee Jones as the co-lead of the film and partner to Will Smith's character. According to producer Laurie MacDonald, "It turned out not to be a big enough role. We would have loved to have her, but when we began to develop the story, we couldn't find a [major] place for her. We always knew that the movie would be about bringing Tommy Lee Jones back." Kristin Lopez, writing an expose for RogerEbert.com titled "Hollywood's Difficult Women," brought up rumors that Jones' return was, in fact, contingent upon Fiorentino's absence and that the studio responded to this stipulation accordingly.

In 2007, Fiorentino optioned the rights to a screenplay about Russian poet Anna Akhmatova with plans to produce and to possibly star in and direct, but the project was dropped. During this period, she was reported to be developing two documentaries, neither of which moved forward. Fiorentino's most recent screen role was a supporting character in Once More with Feeling, released direct-to-video in 2009.

== Personal life ==
Fiorentino married film director and writer John Byrum, whom she had previously worked with on the unfinished movie The War at Home, on June 23, 1992. The couple divorced in 1993, after a year of marriage. In an interview with film critic Roger Ebert shortly after The Last Seduction came out, Fiorentino admitted that the men she met in real life expected her to be like her devious characters, and said that when it came to the parts that she was offered, "Maybe others see in me what I don't necessarily see in myself. And a lot of it in Hollywood has to do with what you look like. I'm dark and my eyes are dark and my voice is deep, and how the hell could I play a Meg Ryan role, the way I look?"

Fiorentino developed a relationship with Los Angeles private investigator Anthony Pellicano, in the period leading to his 2008 trial and conviction, in Los Angeles, on multiple felony charges. While Pellicano was being investigated, Fiorentino was dating former Federal Bureau of Investigation agent Mark Rossini, which law enforcement officials said was her attempt to assist Pellicano's defense. According to prosecutors, Fiorentino told Rossini that she was researching a screenplay based on Pellicano's case. Rossini conducted searches of government computers for information related to the case and passed the results to Fiorentino, who then handed the files over to Pellicano's lawyers in a failed effort to help Pellicano avoid a 15-year prison sentence. Rossini pleaded guilty to illegally accessing FBI computers and resigned from the FBI.

== Filmography ==
Year	Title	Role	Notes
1985	Vision Quest	Carla	
1985	Gotcha!	Sasha Banicek / CIA Agent Cheryl Brewster	
1985	After Hours	Kiki Bridges	
1985	Alfred Hitchcock Presents	Betsy Van Kennon	Episode: "The Night Caller"
1988	The Moderns	Rachel Stone	
1988	Wildfire	Kay	
1989	The Neon Empire	Lucy	Television film
1991	Queens Logic	Carla	
1991	Shout	Molly	
1992	Strangers	Helen	Television film
1992	Chain of Desire	Alma D'Angeli	
1993	Beyond the Law	Renee Jason	
1993	Acting on Impulse	Susan Gittes	Television film
1994	The Desperate Trail	Sarah O'Rourke	Television film
1994	The Last Seduction	Bridget Gregory / Wendy Kroy	Independent Spirit Award for Best Female Lead; London Film Critics Circle Award for Actress of the Year; New York Film Critics Circle Award for Best Actress; Society of Texas Film Critics Award for Best Actress; Nominated—BAFTA Award for Best Actress in a Leading Role; Nominated—Boston Society of Film Critics Award for Best Actress (2nd place); Nominated—Chicago Film Critics Association Award for Best Actress; Nominated—National Society of Film Critics Award for Best Actress (3rd place)
1995	Bodily Harm	Rita Cates	
1995	Jade	Anna Katrina Maxwell-Gavin / Jade	
1995	Charlie's Ghost Story	Marta	
1996	Unforgettable	Dr. Martha Briggs	
1996	Larger than Life	Terry Bonura	
1997	Kicked in the Head	Megan	
1997	Men in Black	Dr. Laurel Weaver	Nominated—Blockbuster Entertainment Award for Favorite Supporting Actress – Sci-Fi; Nominated—Satellite Award for Best Supporting Actress – Motion Picture Musical or Comedy
1998	Body Count	Natalie	Direct-to-video
1999	Dogma	Bethany Sloane	
2000	Ordinary Decent Criminal	Christine Lynch	
2000	What Planet Are You From?	Helen Gordon	
2000	Where the Money Is	Carol Ann McKay	
2002	Liberty Stands Still	Liberty Wallace	Direct-to-video
2009	Once More with Feeling	Lydia	Direct-to-video
