= Academy Award for Best Actress =

Award presented annually by the Academy of Motion Picture Arts and Sciences

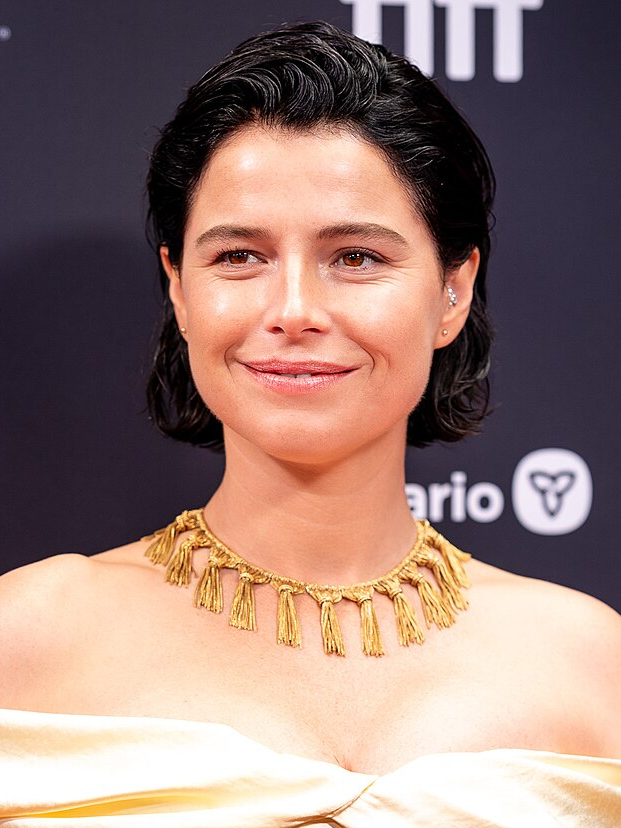
- The 2026 recipient: Jessie Buckley
- Awarded for: Best Performance by an Actress in a Leading Role
- Country: United States
- Presented by: Academy of Motion Picture Arts and Sciences (AMPAS)
- First award: May 16, 1929; 97 years ago (for films released during the 1927/1928 film season)
- Most recent winner: Jessie Buckley, Hamnet (2025)

Highlights
- Most awards: Katharine Hepburn (4)
- Most nominations: Meryl Streep (17)
- Website: oscars.org

The Academy Award for Best Actress is an award presented annually by the Academy of Motion Picture Arts and Sciences (AMPAS). It has been awarded since the 1st Academy Awards to an actress who has delivered an outstanding performance in a leading role in a film released that year. The award was traditionally presented by the previous year's Best Actor winner. However, in recent years, it has shifted towards being presented by previous years' Best Actress winners instead.

The Best Actress award has been presented 98 times, to 81 different actresses. The first winner was Janet Gaynor for her roles in 7th Heaven (1927), Street Angel (1928), and Sunrise: A Song of Two Humans (1927), and the most recent winner is Jessie Buckley for her portrayal of Agnes Shakespeare in Hamnet (2025). The record for most wins is four, held by Katharine Hepburn; Frances McDormand has won three times, and thirteen other actresses have won the award twice. Meryl Streep has received the most nominations in the category—seventeen—and has won twice. At the 41st Academy Awards in 1969, Barbra Streisand and Katharine Hepburn received the same number of votes and so shared the award, the only time this has occurred.

== Nominations process ==
Nominees are currently determined by single transferable vote within the actors branch of AMPAS; winners are selected by a plurality vote from the entire eligible voting members of the Academy.

In the first three years of the awards, actors and actresses were nominated as the best individuals in their categories. At that time, all of their work during the qualifying period (as many as three films, in some cases) was listed after the award. Despite this, at the 3rd Academy Awards, held in 1930, only one film was cited in each winner's award regardless of how many they were eligible to be considered for during that span. The current system, in which an actress is nominated for a specific performance in a single film, was introduced for the 4th Academy Awards. Starting with the 9th Academy Awards, held in 1937, the category was limited to a maximum five nominations per year.

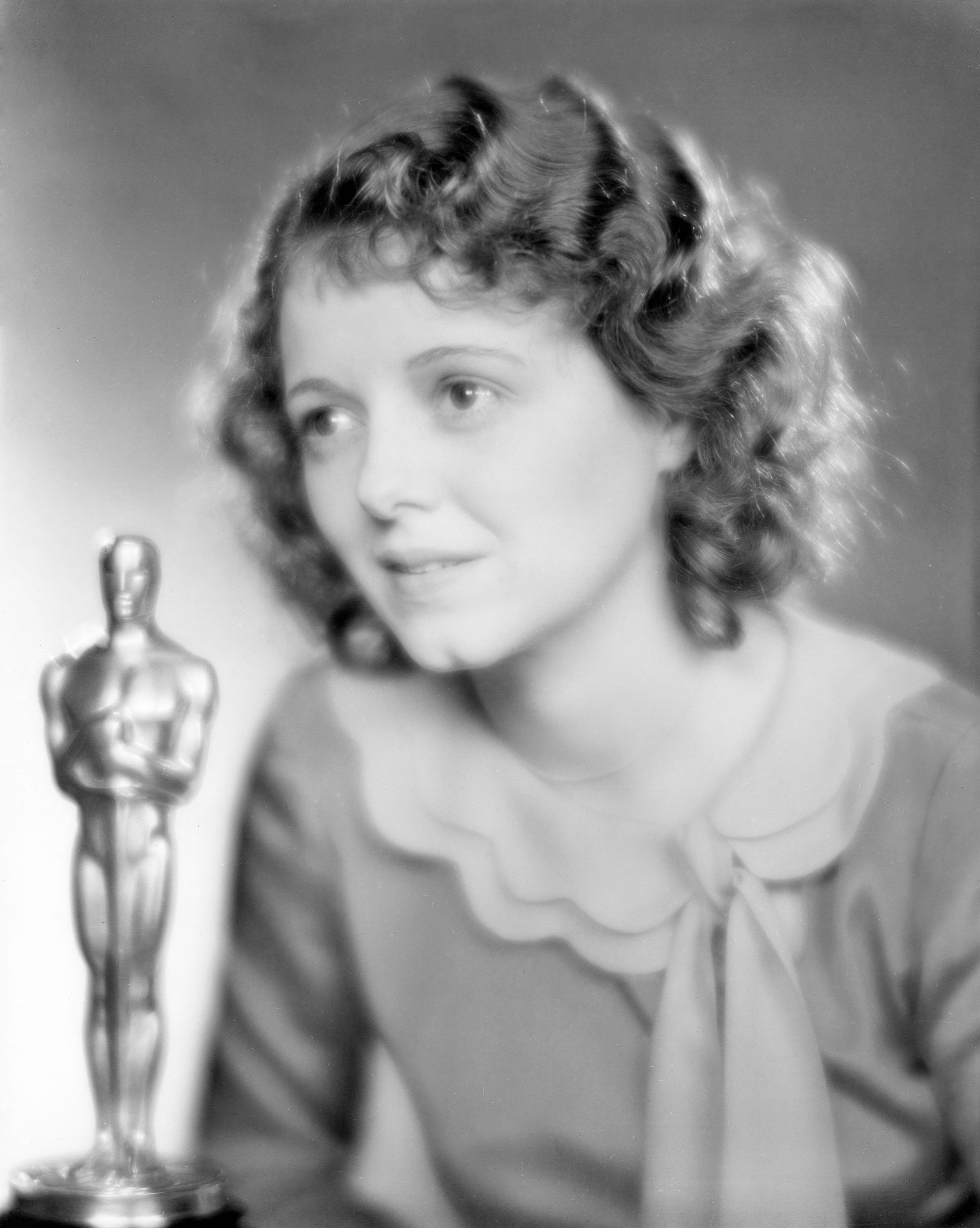
Janet Gaynor was the inaugural winner, for three films: 7th Heaven (1927), Street Angel (1928), and Sunrise: A Song of Two Humans (1927).

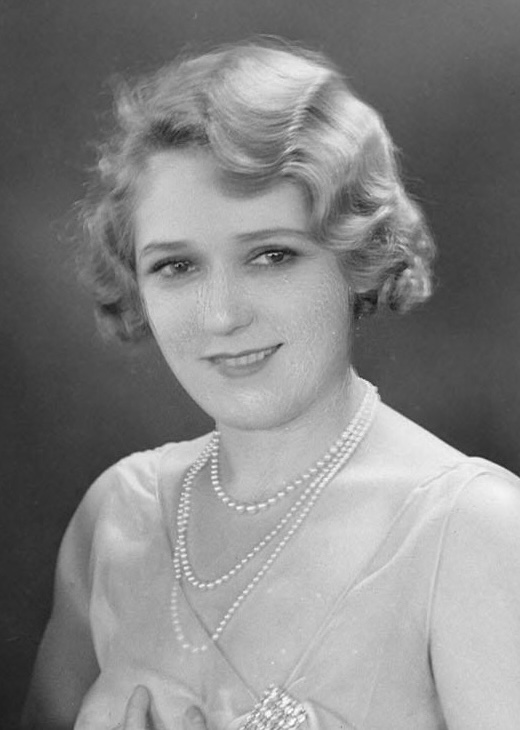
Mary Pickford won for Coquette (1929).

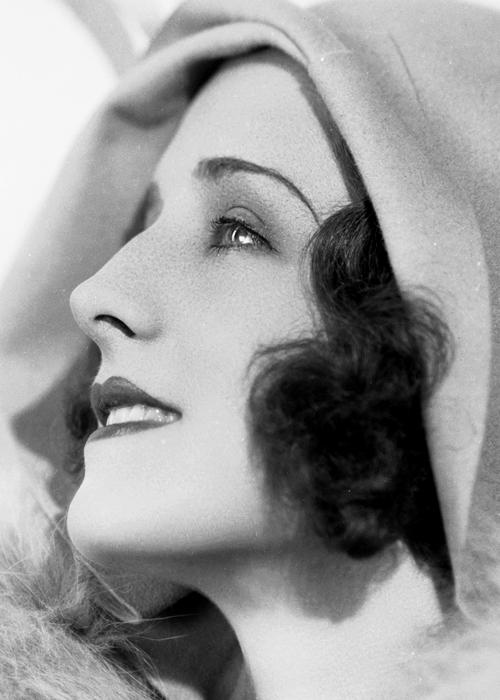
Norma Shearer won for The Divorcee (1930).

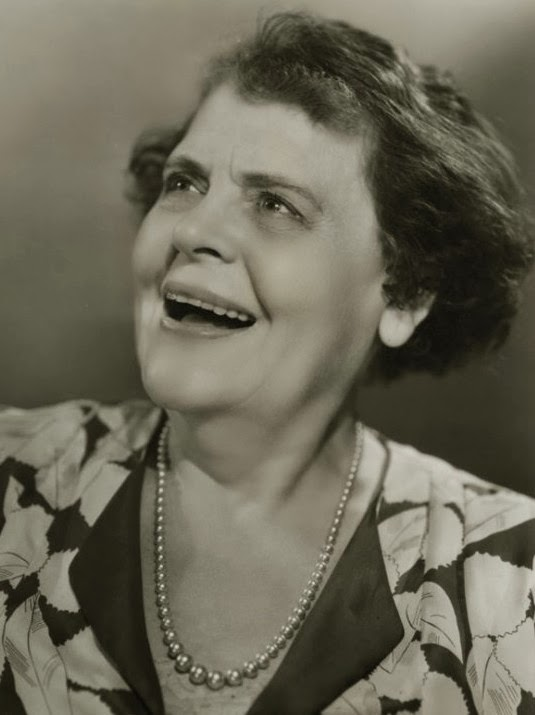
Marie Dressler won for Min and Bill (1930).

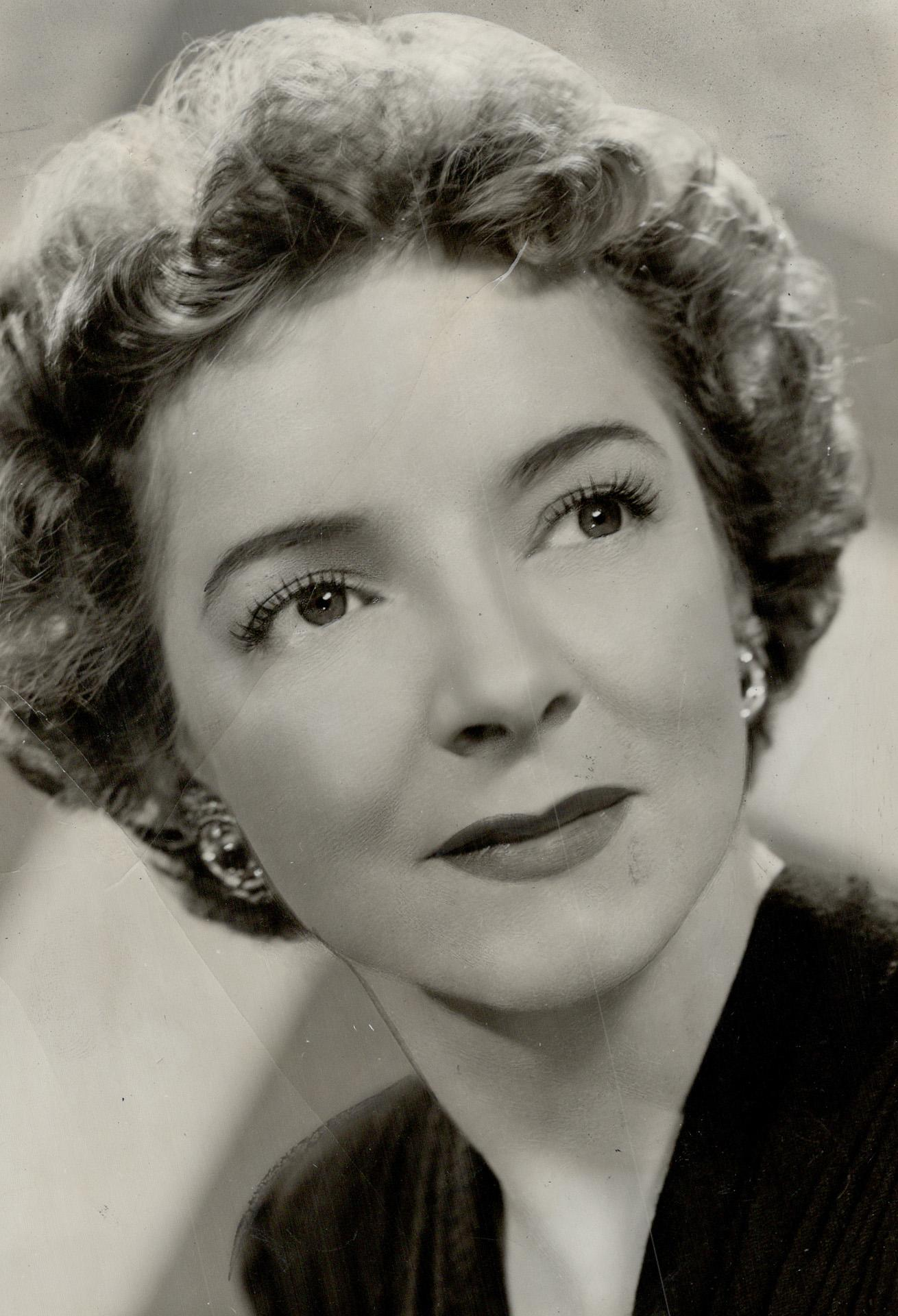
Helen Hayes won for The Sin of Madelon Claudet (1931); first actress to complete the EGOT.

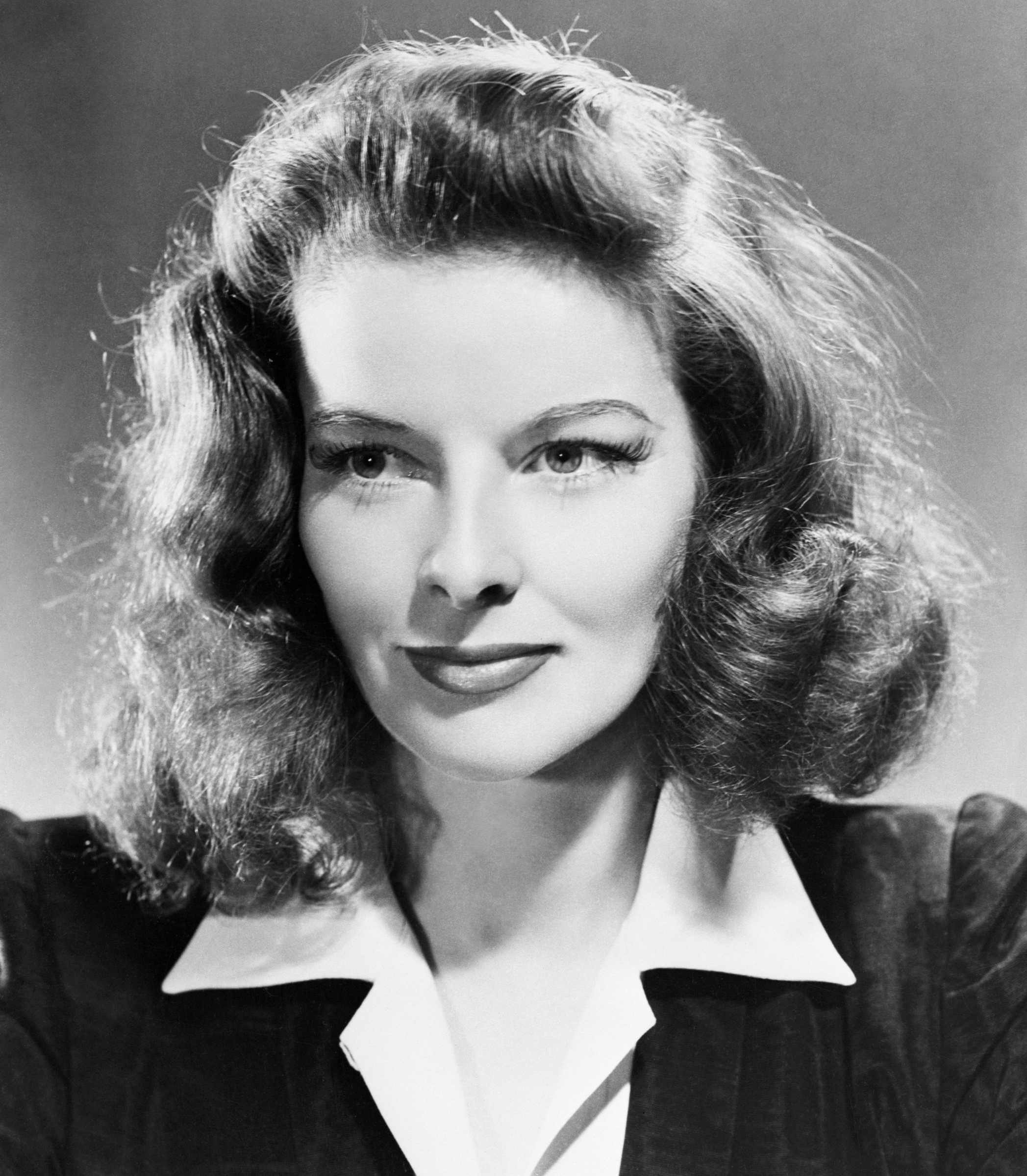
Katharine Hepburn won four times, for: Morning Glory (1933), Guess Who's Coming to Dinner (1967), The Lion in Winter (1968), and On Golden Pond (1981).

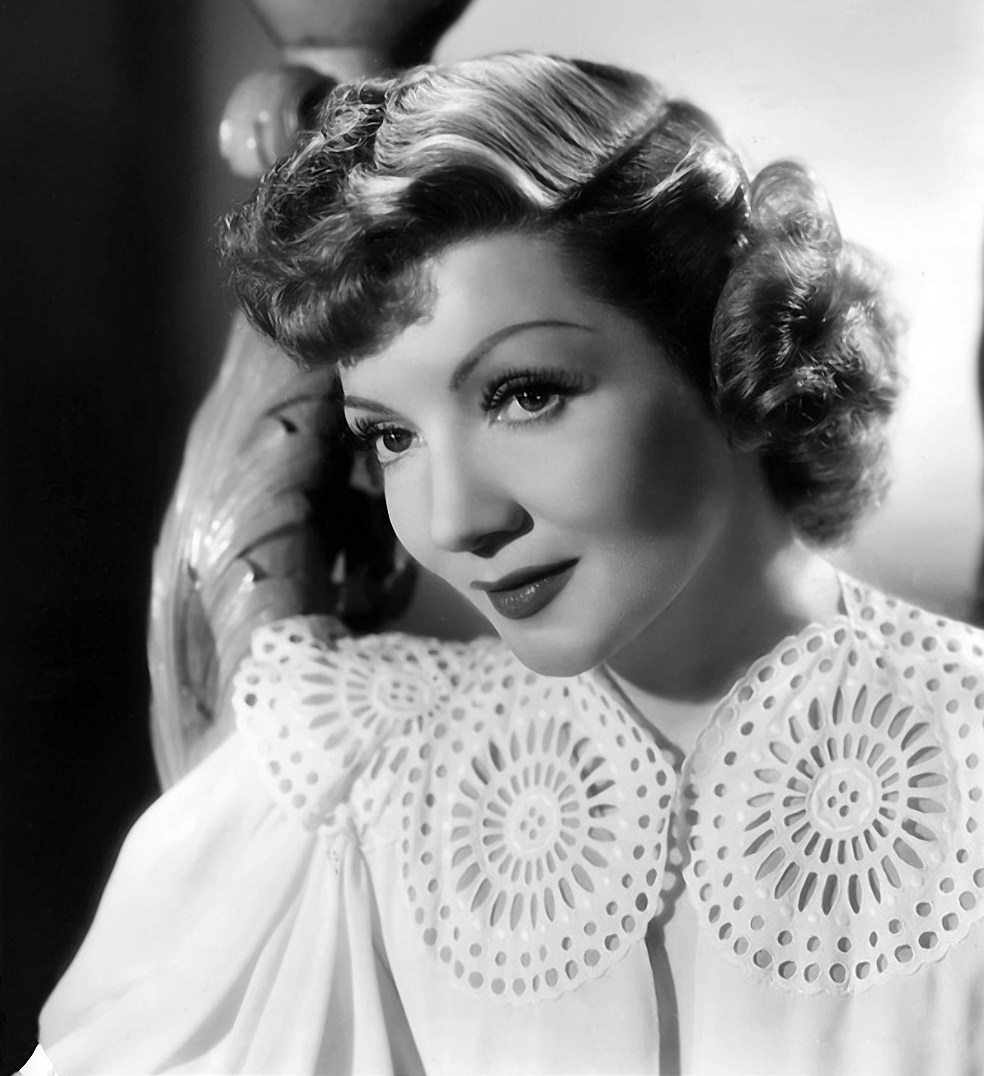
Claudette Colbert won for It Happened One Night (1934).

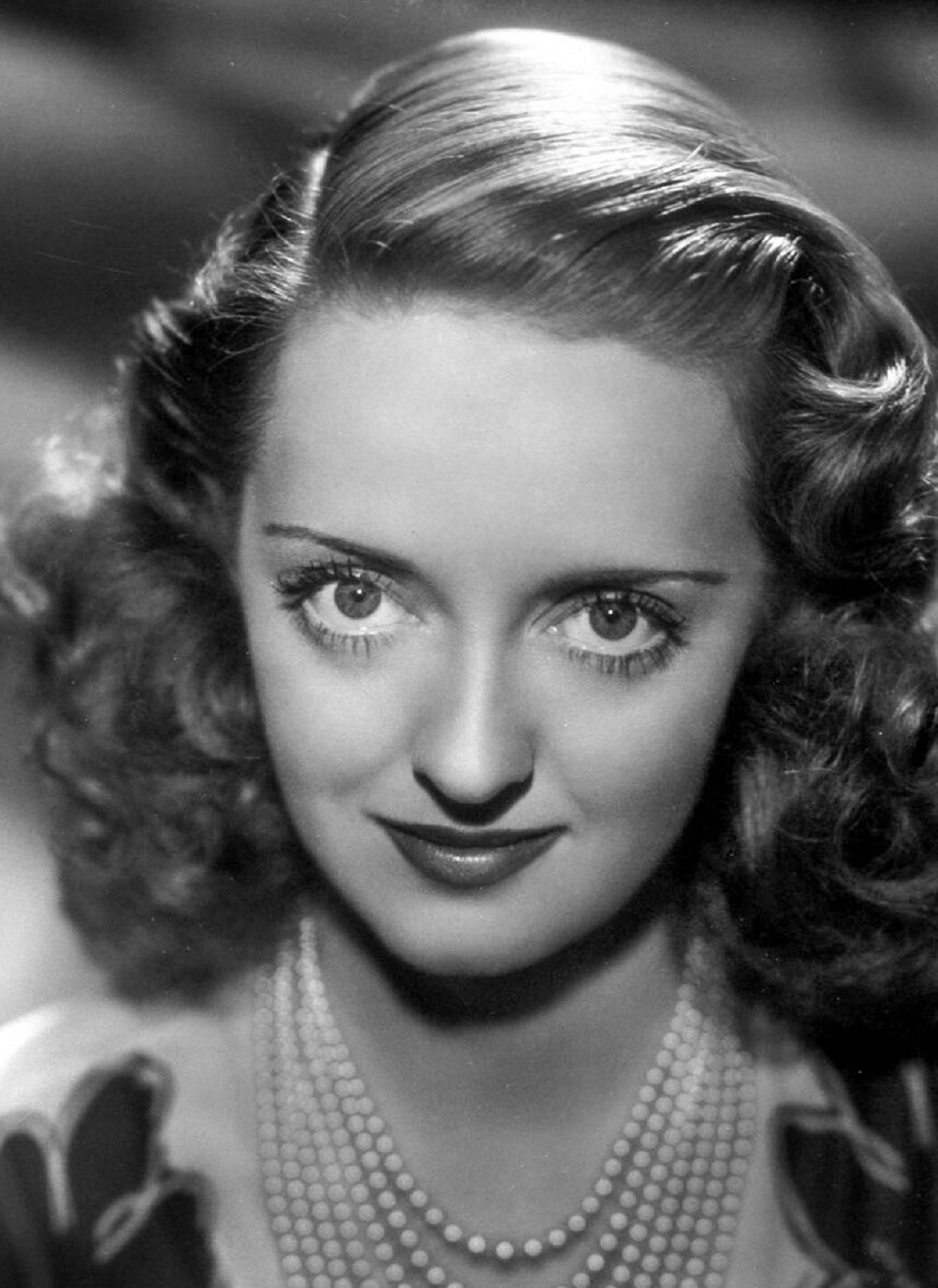
Bette Davis won twice, for Dangerous (1935) and Jezebel (1938).

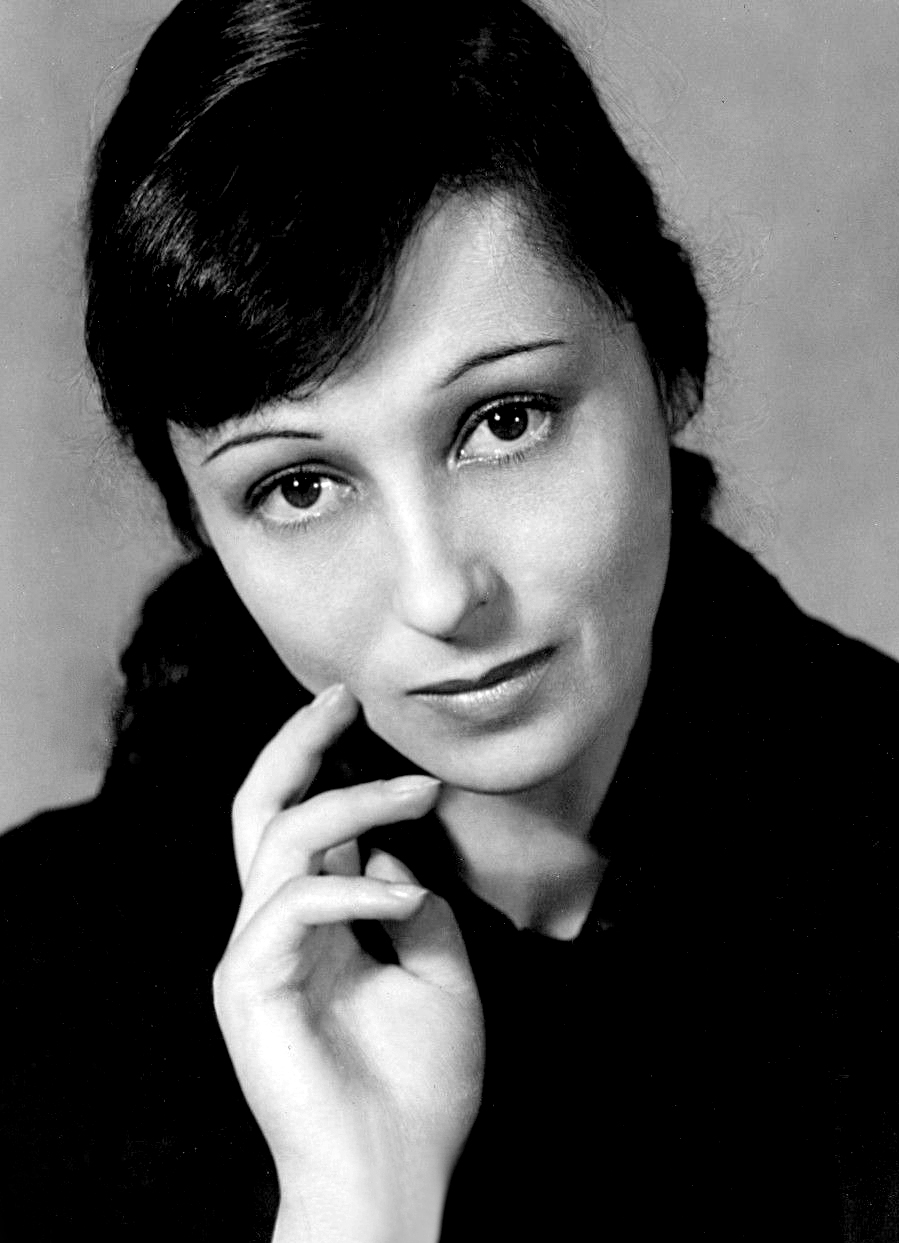
Luise Rainer was the first to win twice consecutively, for The Great Ziegfeld (1936) and The Good Earth (1937).

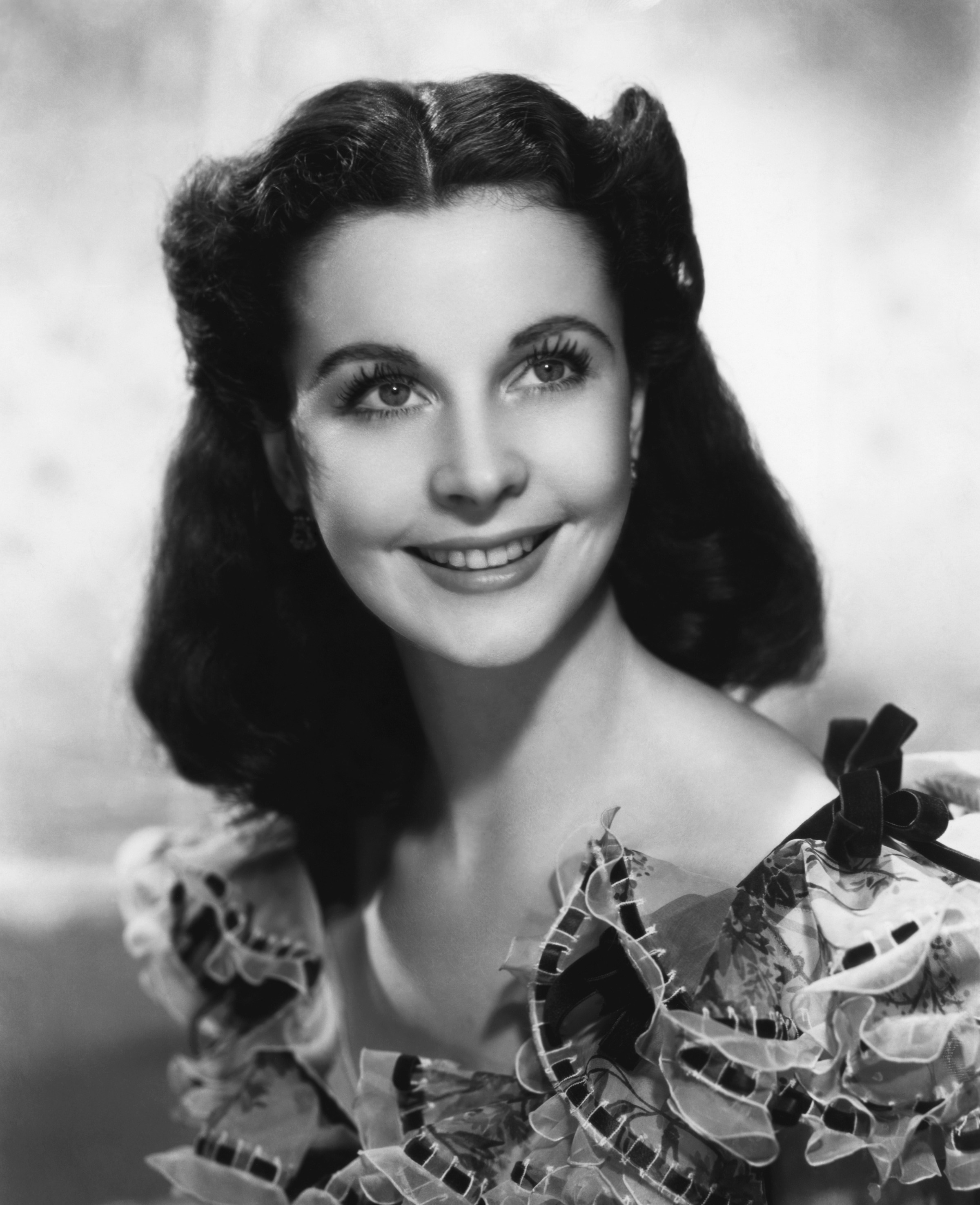
Vivien Leigh won twice, for Gone with the Wind (1939) and A Streetcar Named Desire (1951).

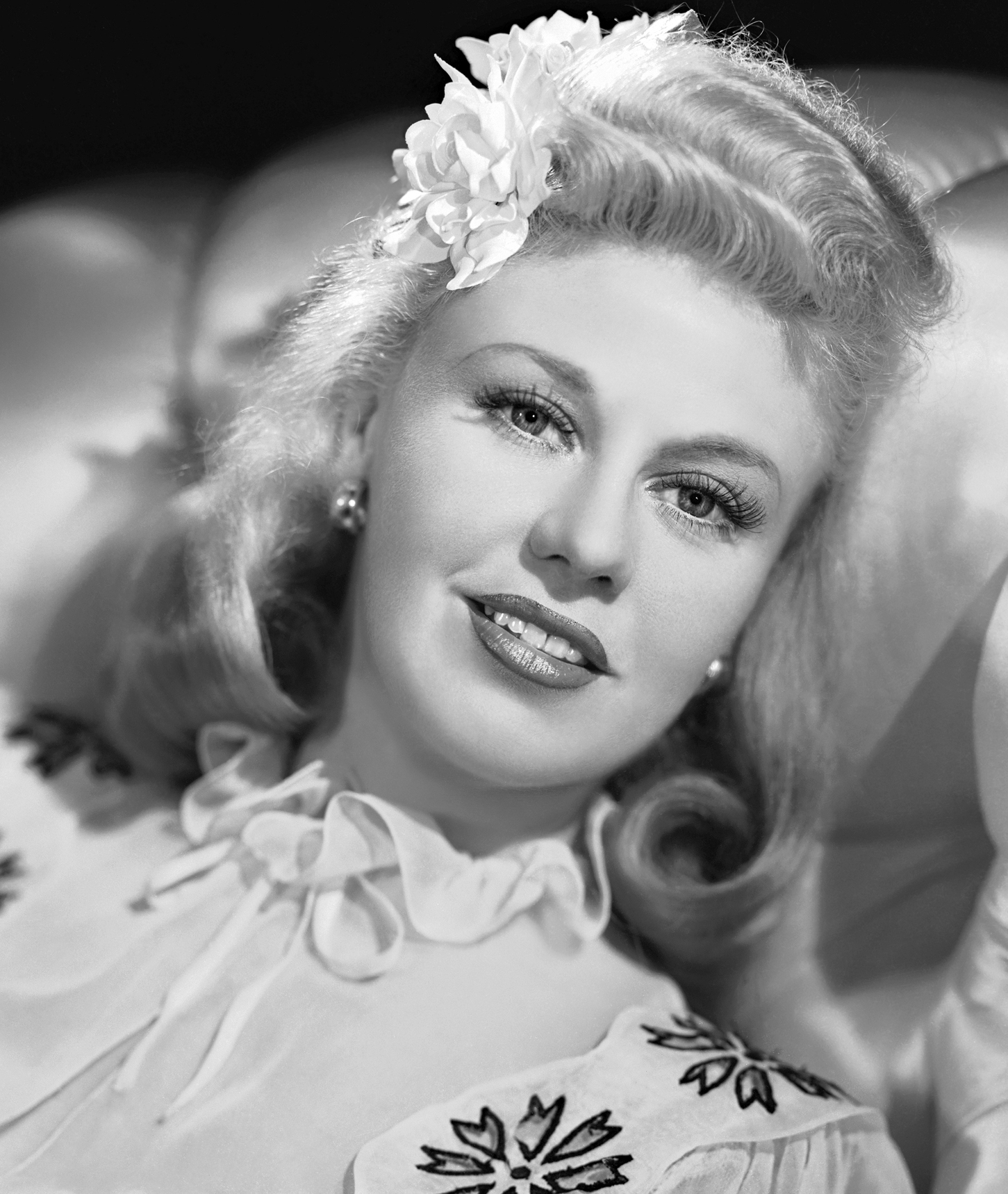
Ginger Rogers won for Kitty Foyle (1940).

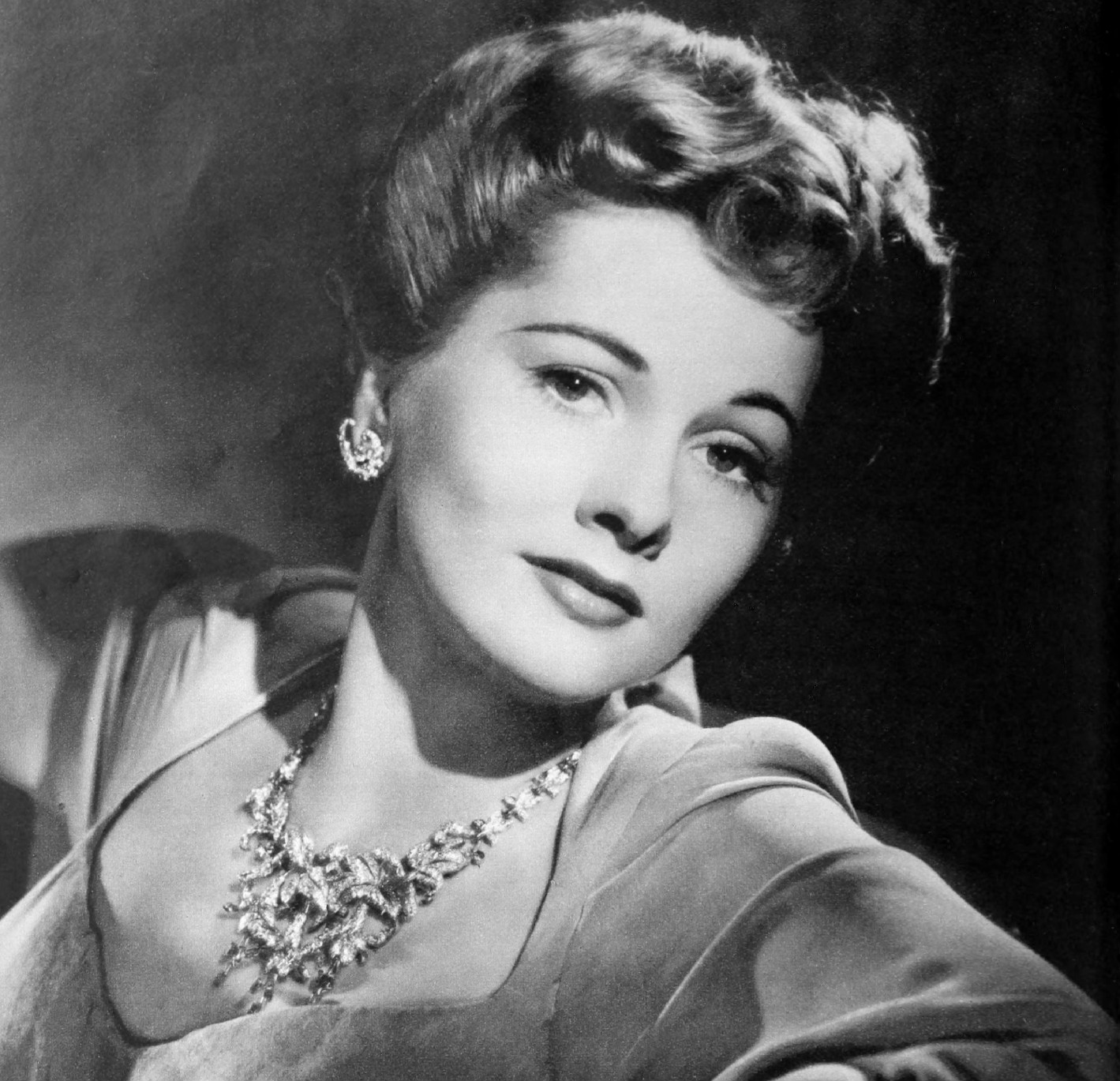
Joan Fontaine won for Suspicion (1941).

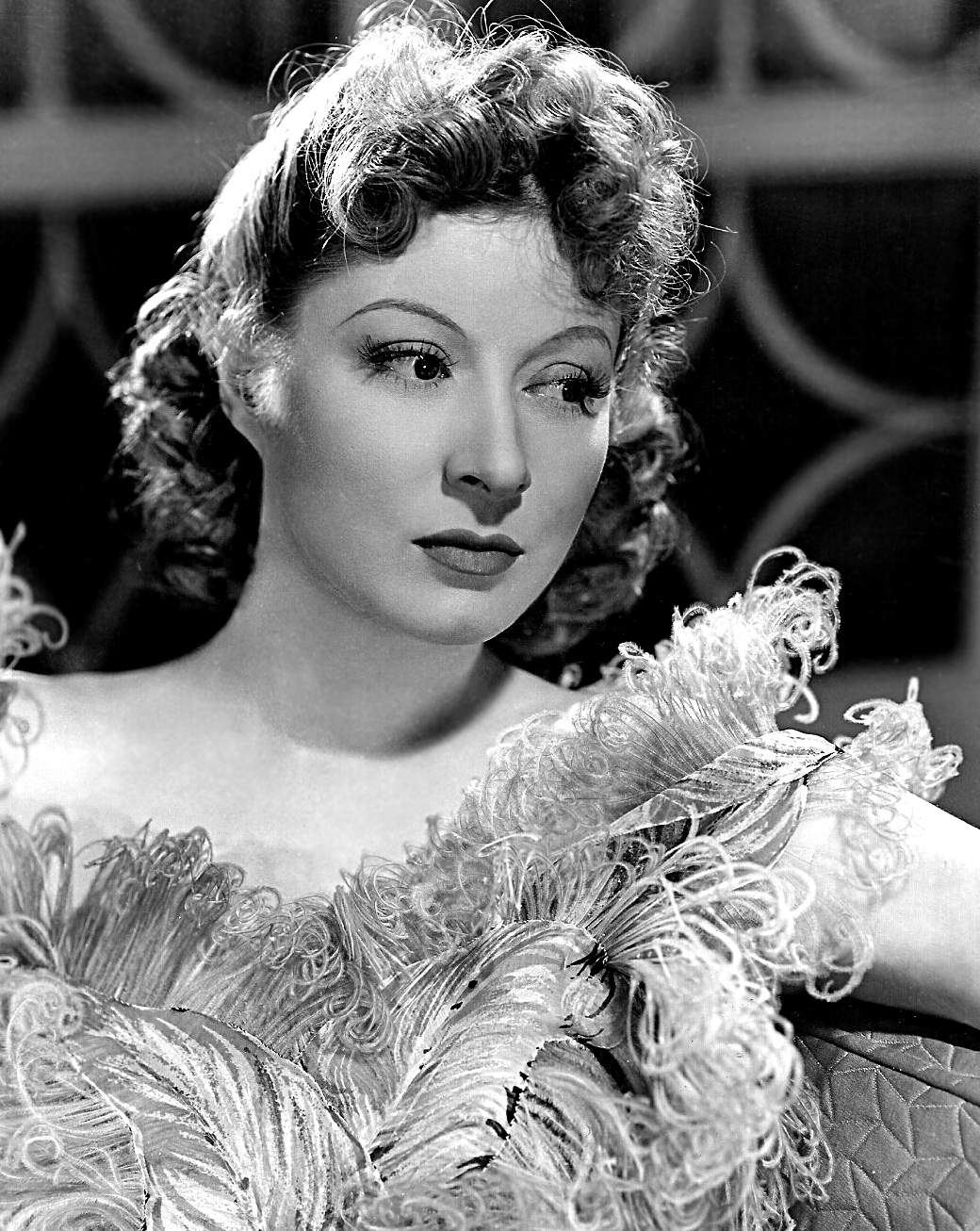
Greer Garson won for Mrs. Miniver (1942).

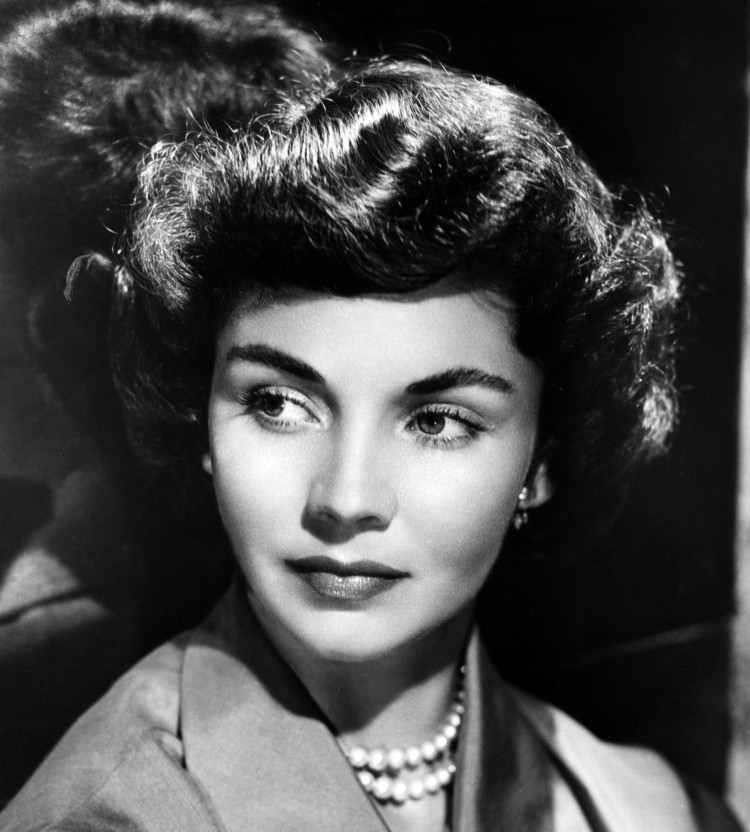
Jennifer Jones won for The Song of Bernadette (1943).

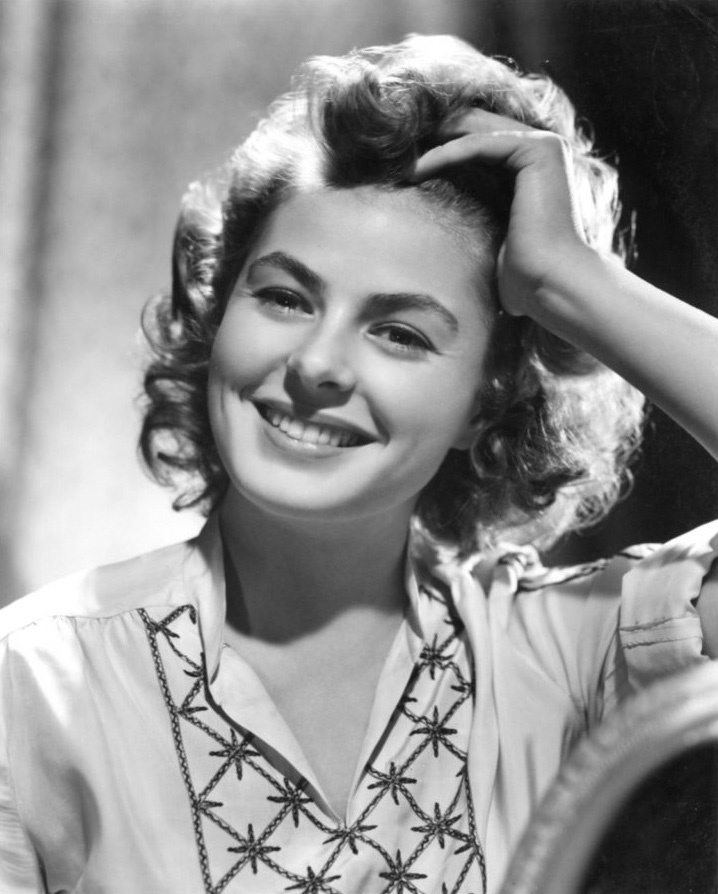
Ingrid Bergman won twice, for Gaslight (1944) and Anastasia (1956).

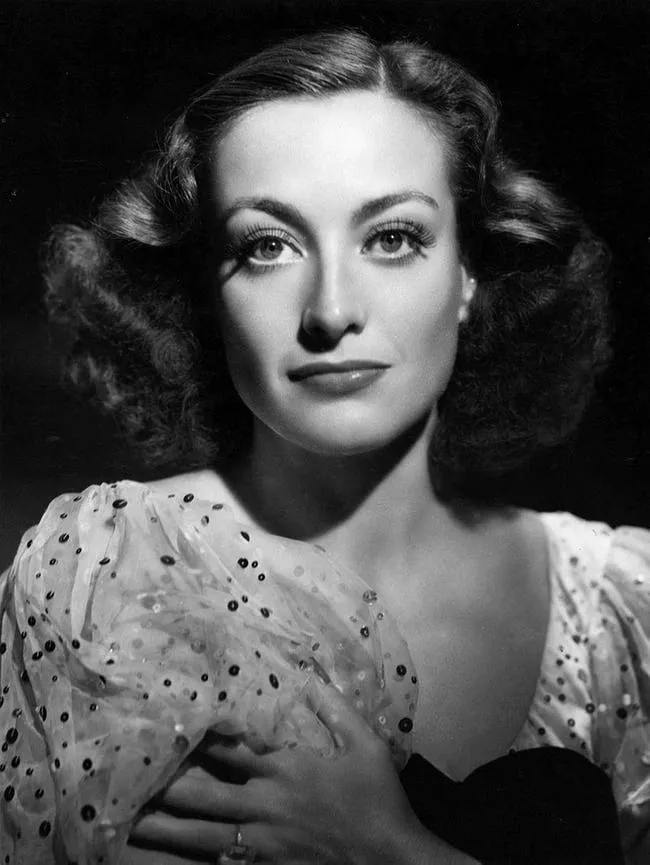
Joan Crawford won for Mildred Pierce (1945).

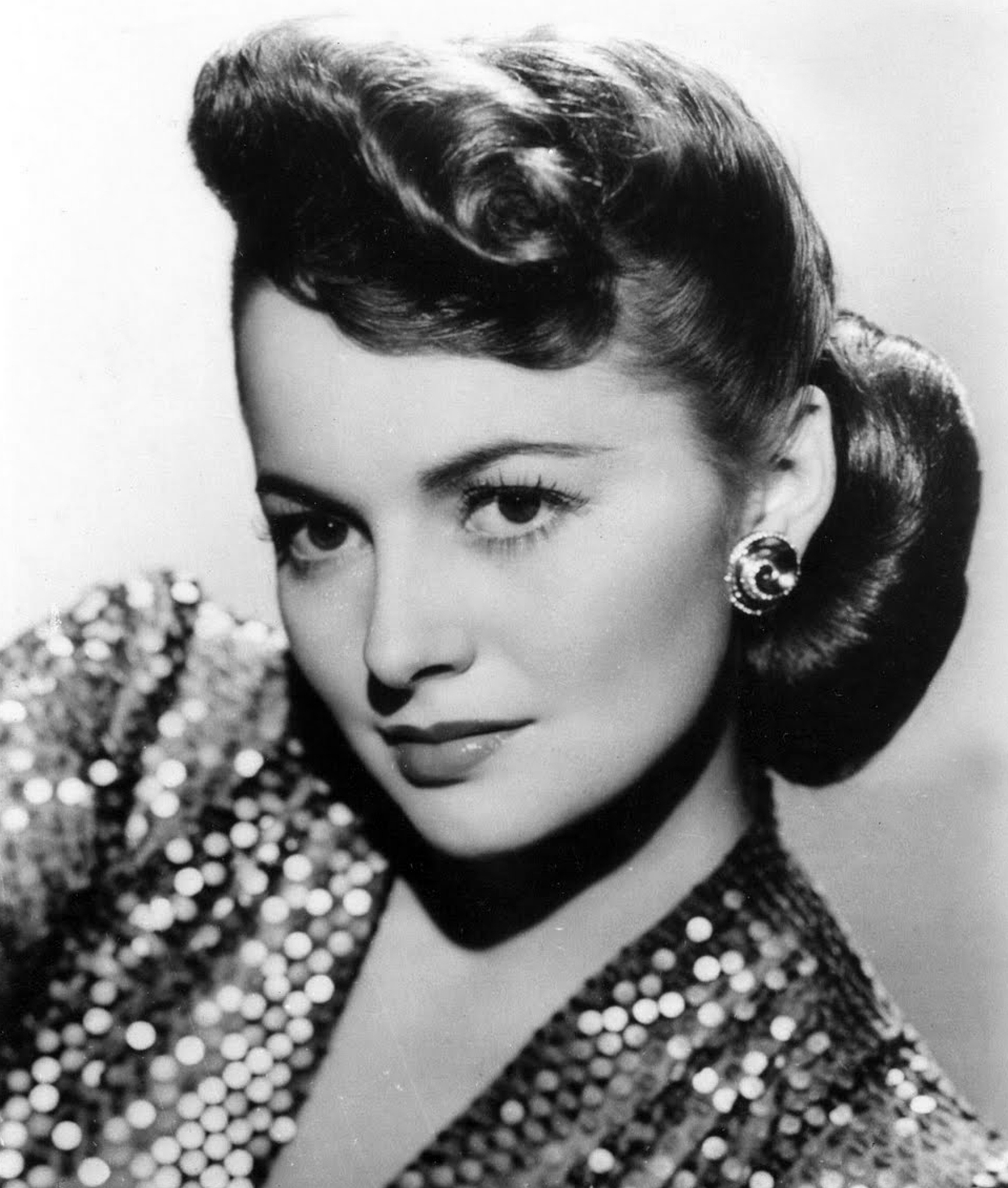
Olivia de Havilland won twice, for To Each His Own (1946) and The Heiress (1949).

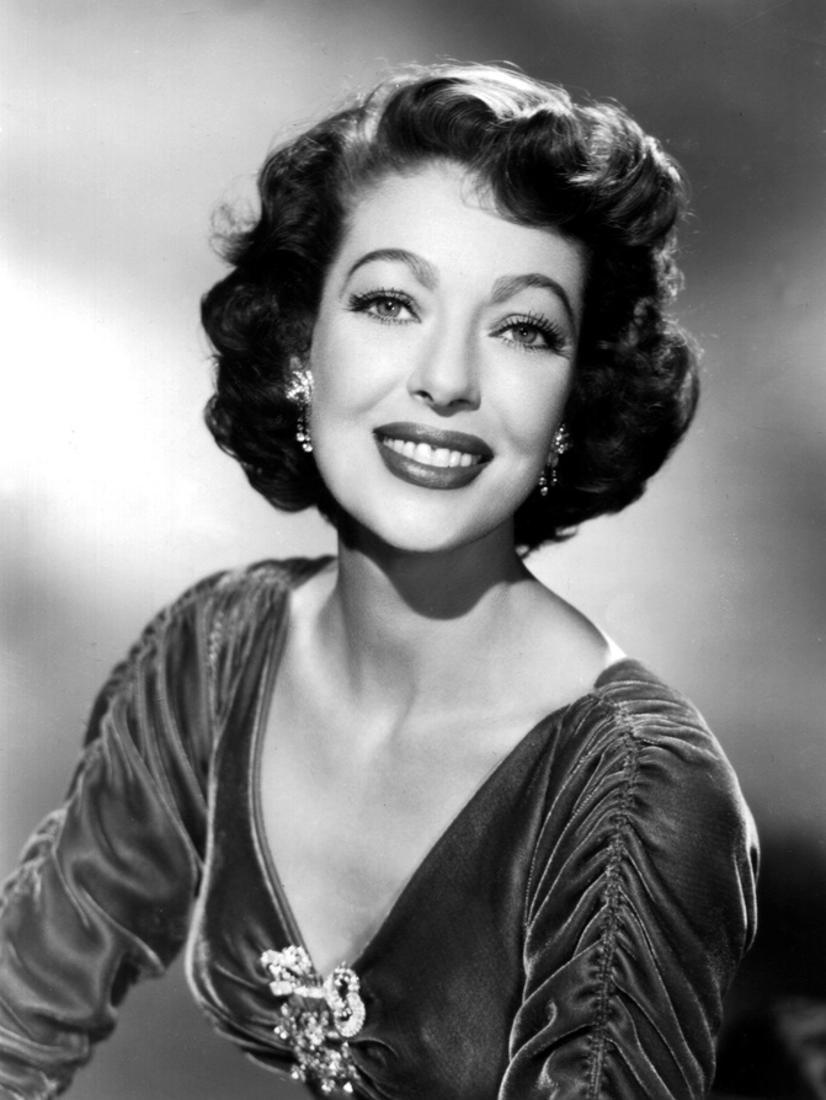
Loretta Young won for The Farmer's Daughter (1947).

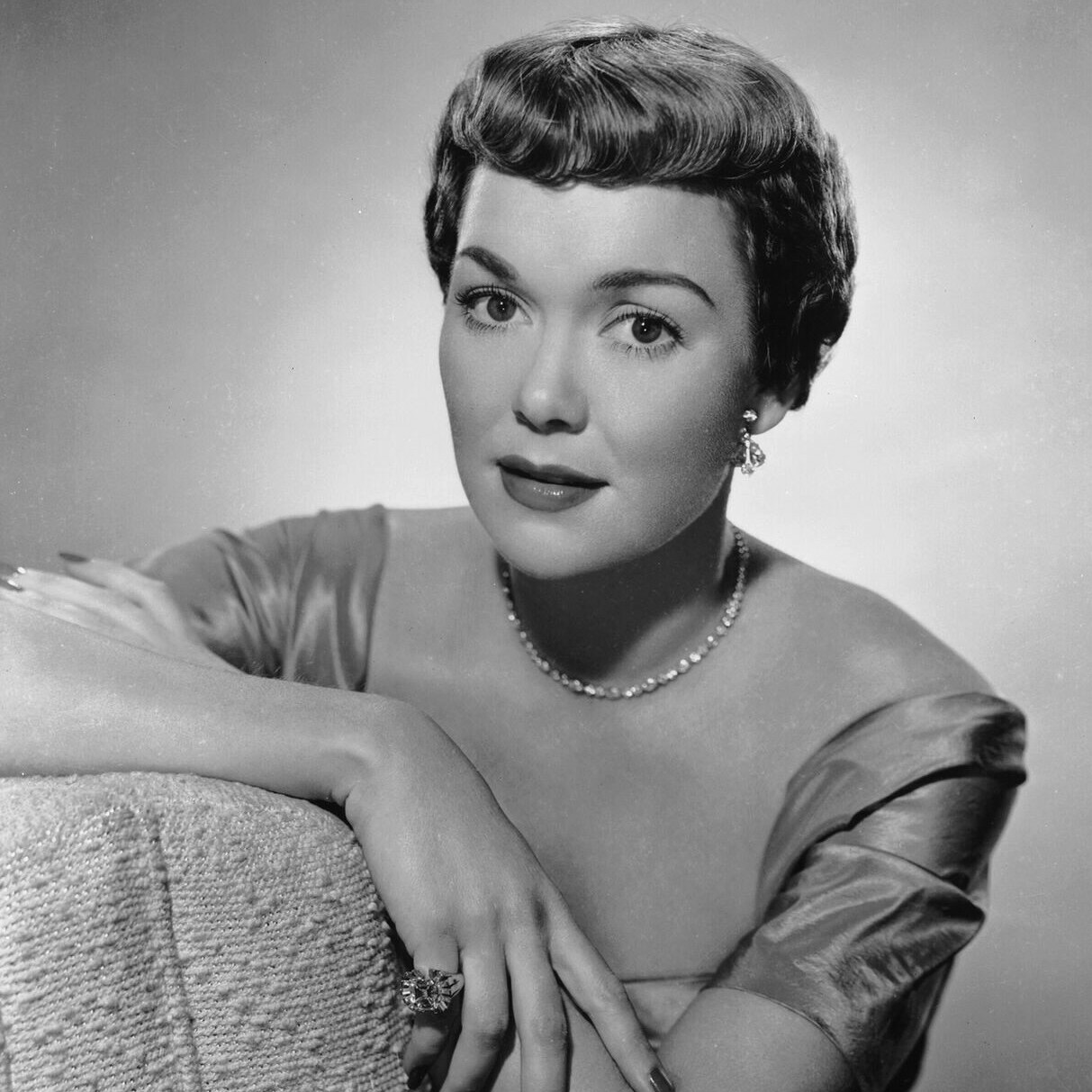
Jane Wyman won for Johnny Belinda (1948); first winner to utilize ASL.

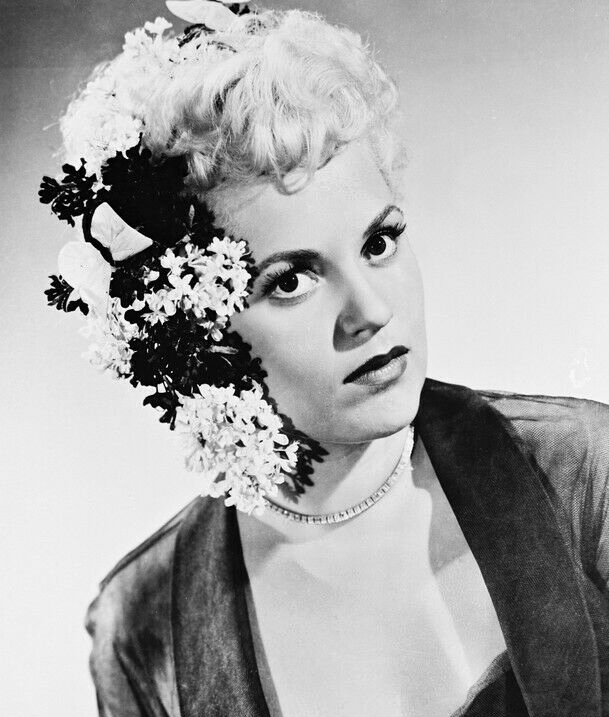
Judy Holliday won for Born Yesterday (1950).

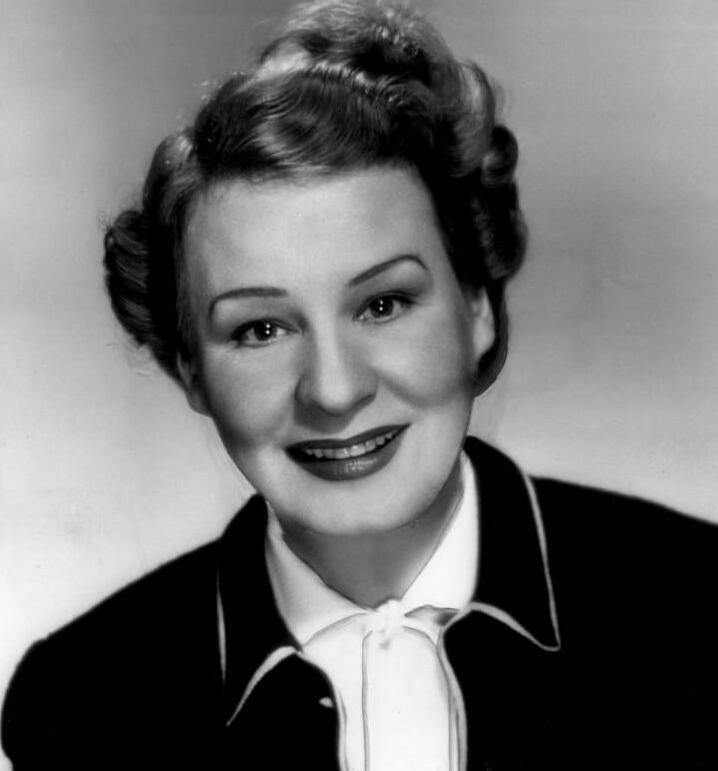
Shirley Booth won for Come Back, Little Sheba (1952); won Tony for the same role—first actress to accomplish this.

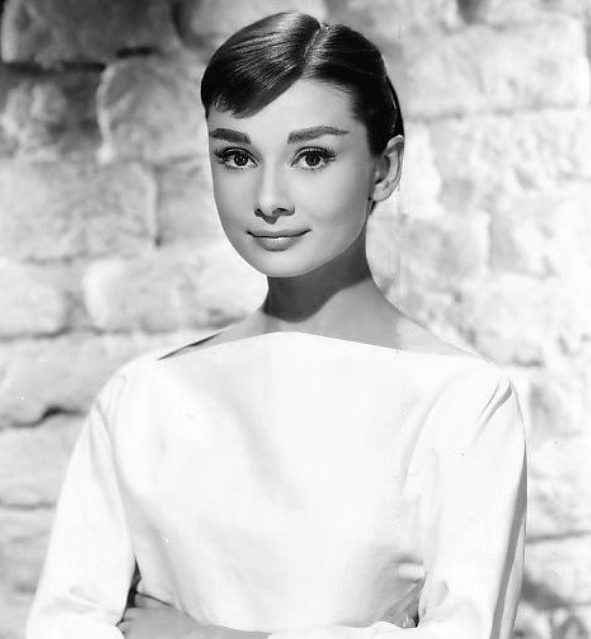
Audrey Hepburn won for Roman Holiday (1953).

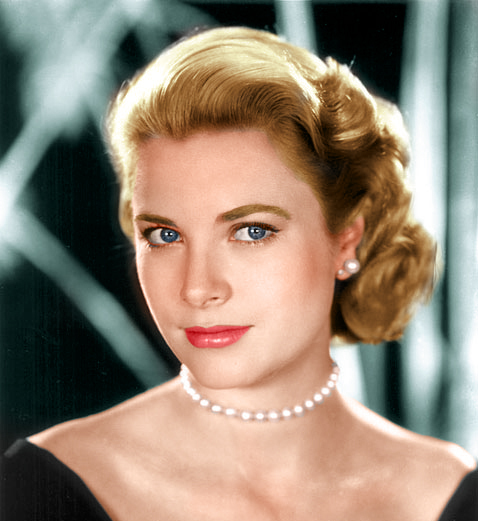
Grace Kelly won for The Country Girl (1954).

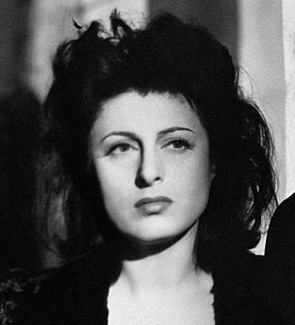
Anna Magnani won for The Rose Tattoo (1955).

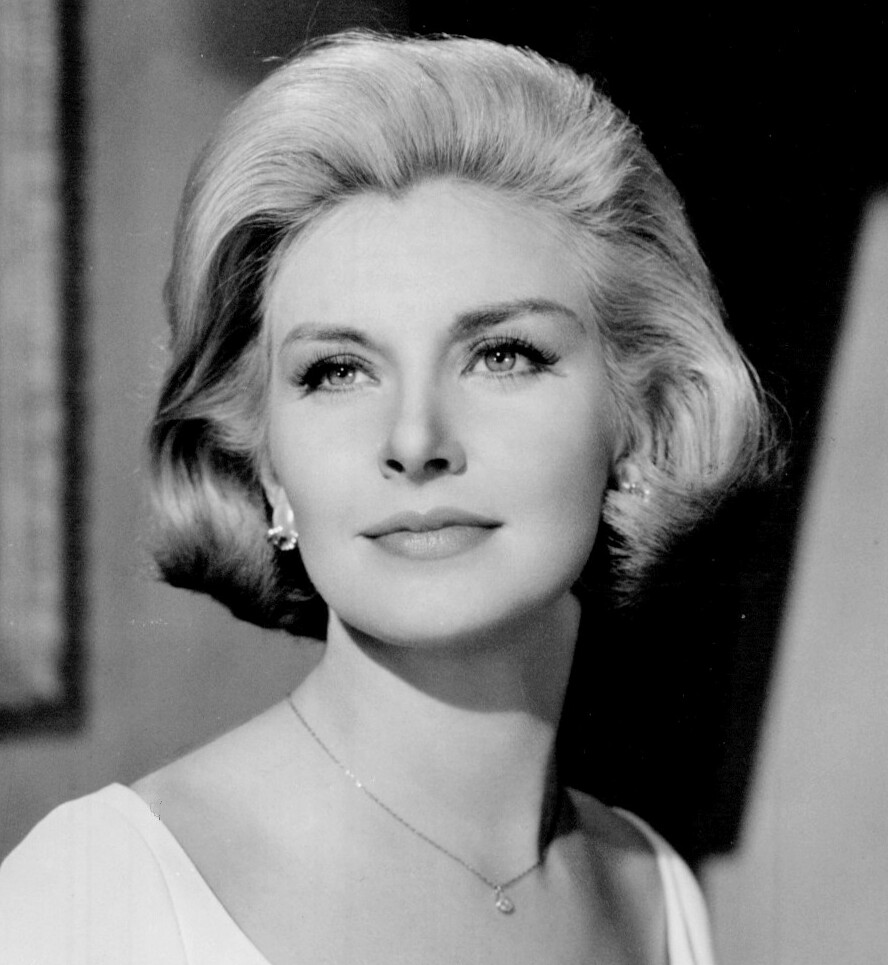
Joanne Woodward won for The Three Faces of Eve (1957).

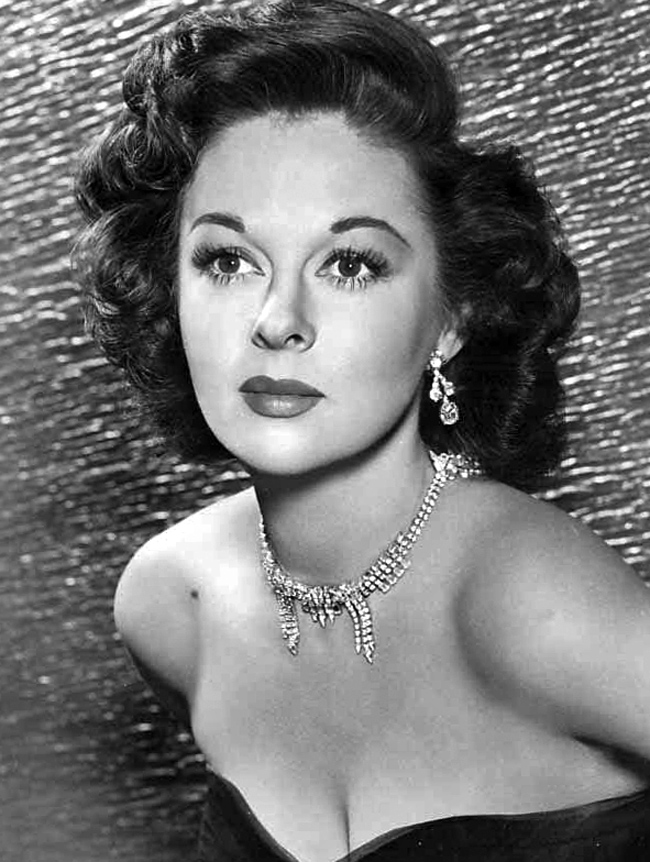
Susan Hayward won for I Want to Live! (1958).

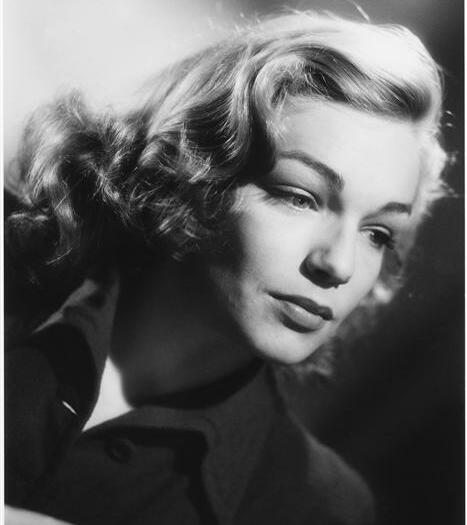
Simone Signoret won for Room at the Top (1959).

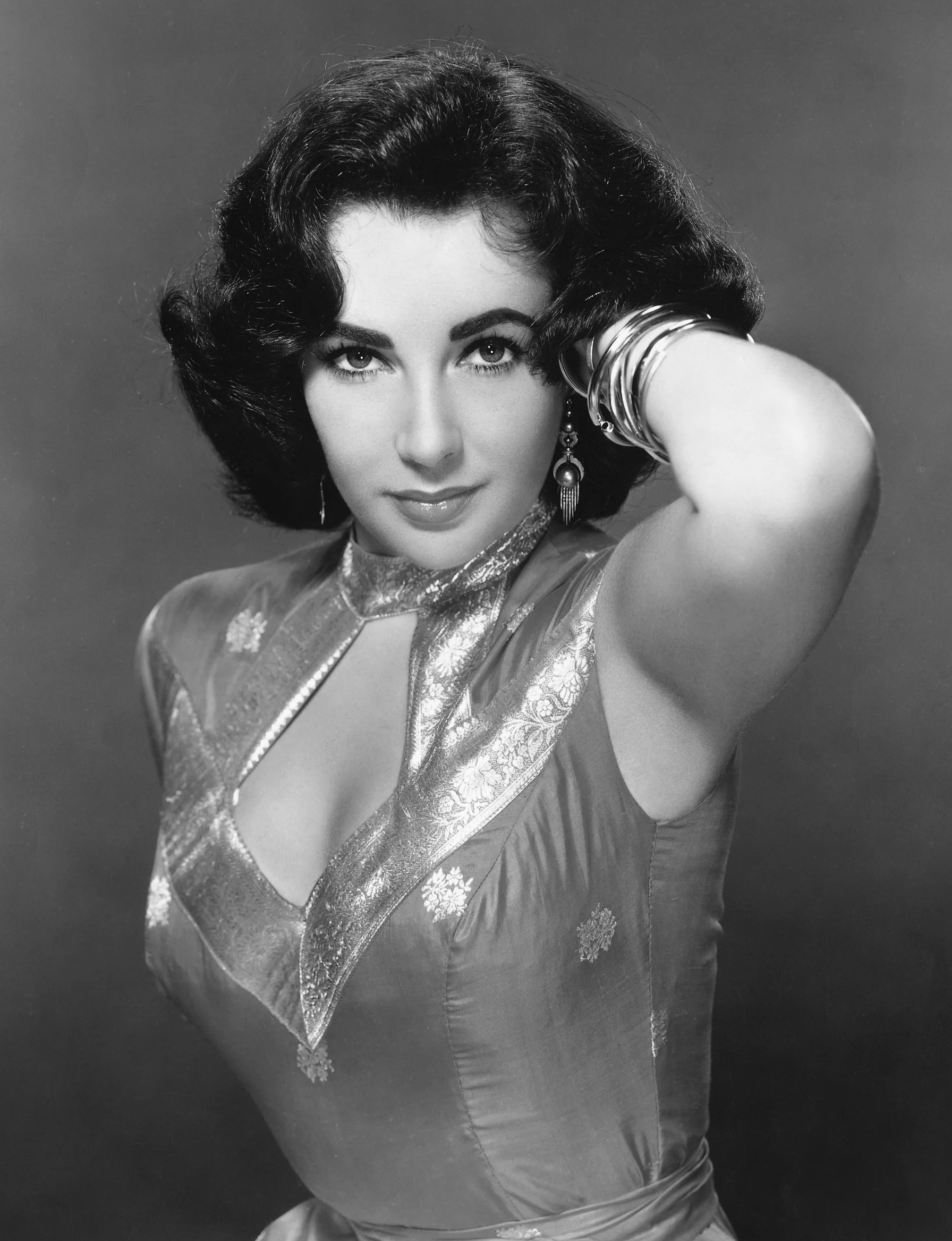
Elizabeth Taylor won twice, for BUtterfield 8 (1960) and Who's Afraid of Virginia Woolf? (1966).

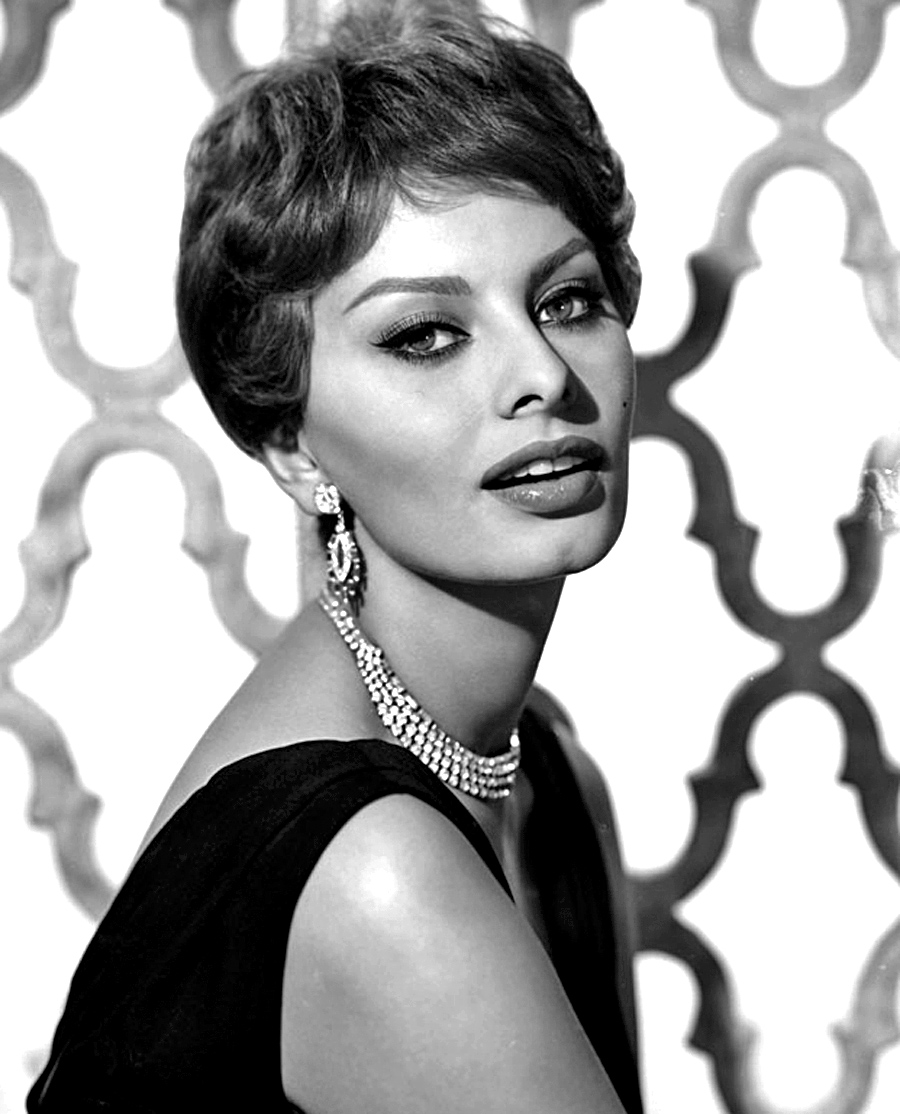
Sophia Loren won for Two Women (1960); first for a non-English (Italian) dialogue role.

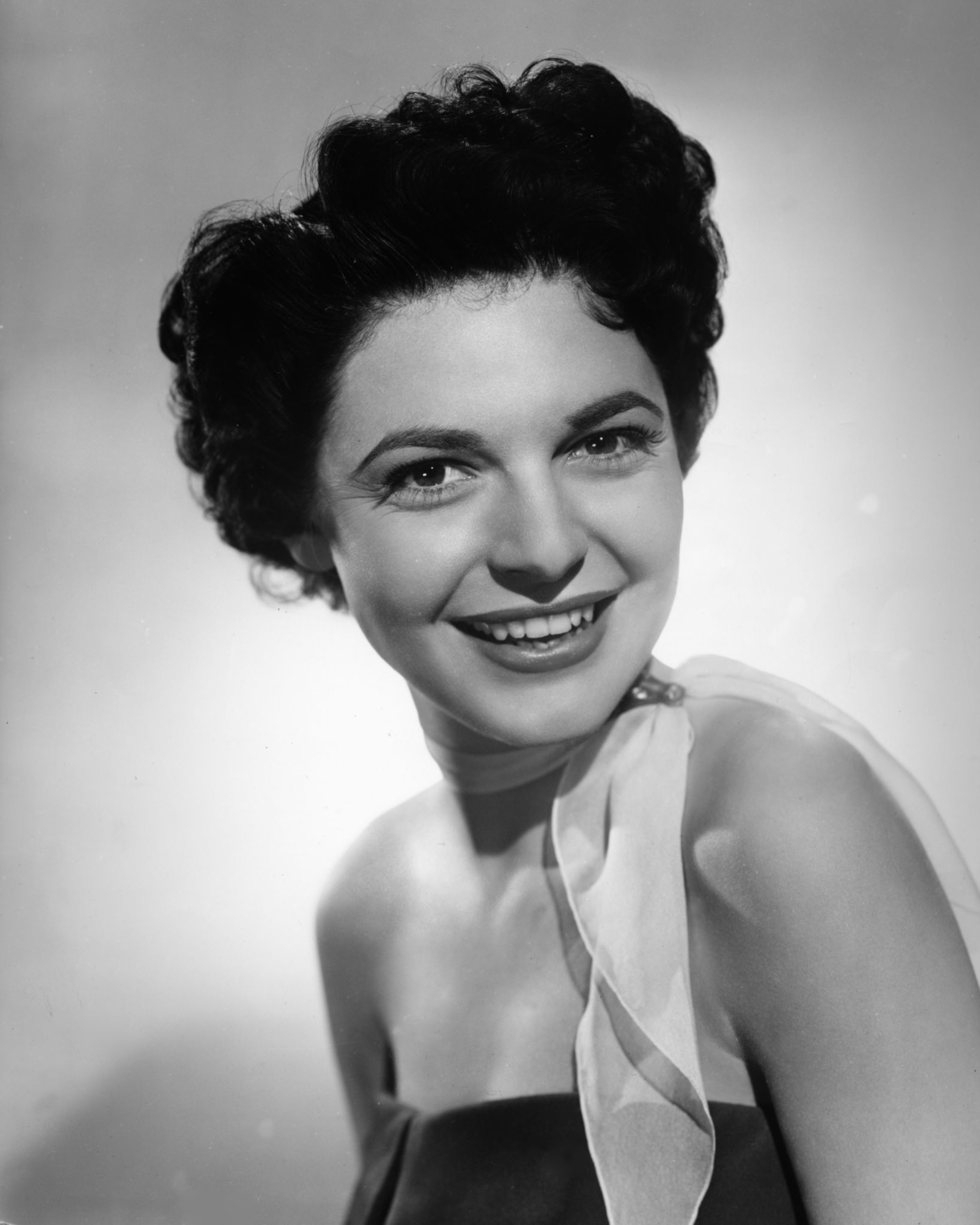
Anne Bancroft won for The Miracle Worker (1962).

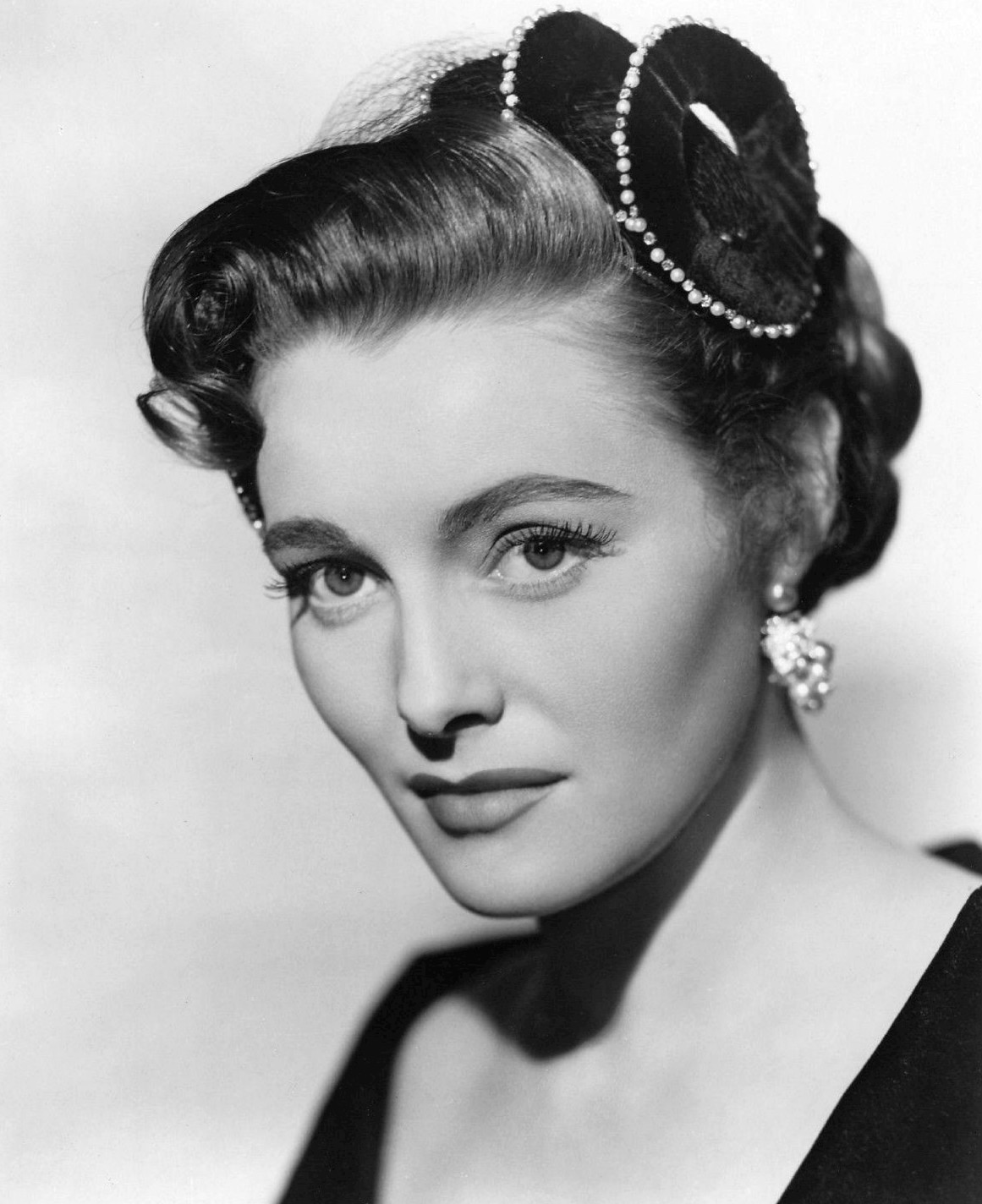
Patricia Neal won for Hud (1963).

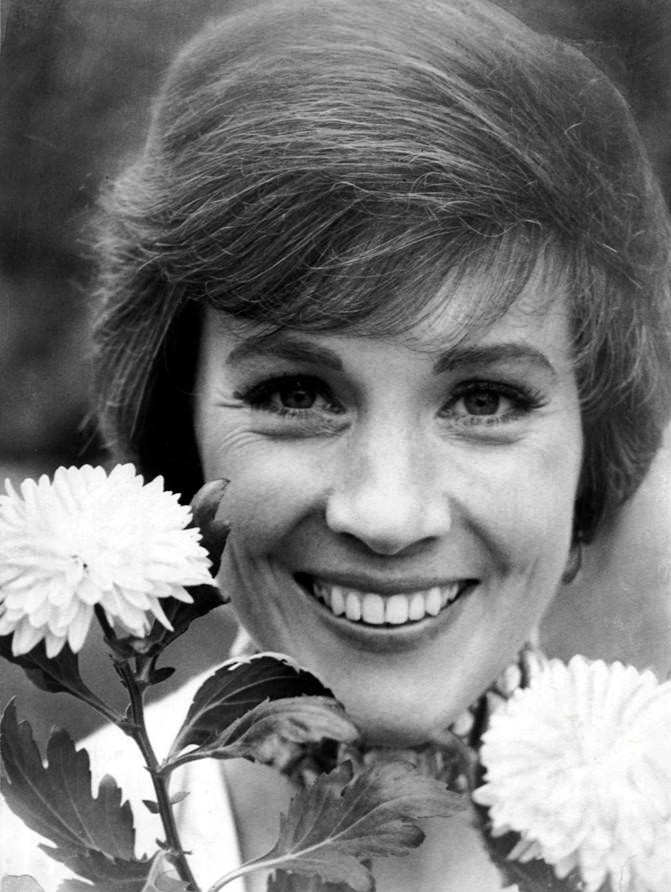
Julie Andrews won for Mary Poppins (1964).

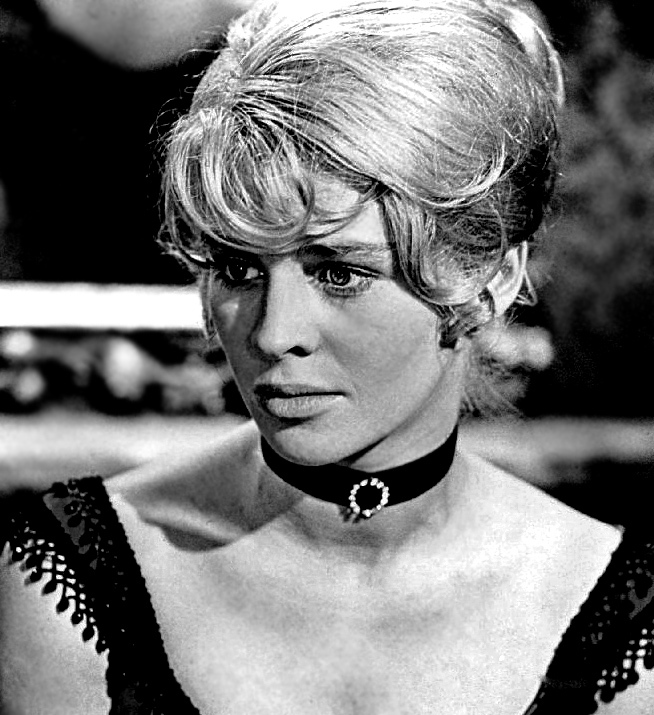
Julie Christie won for Darling (1965).

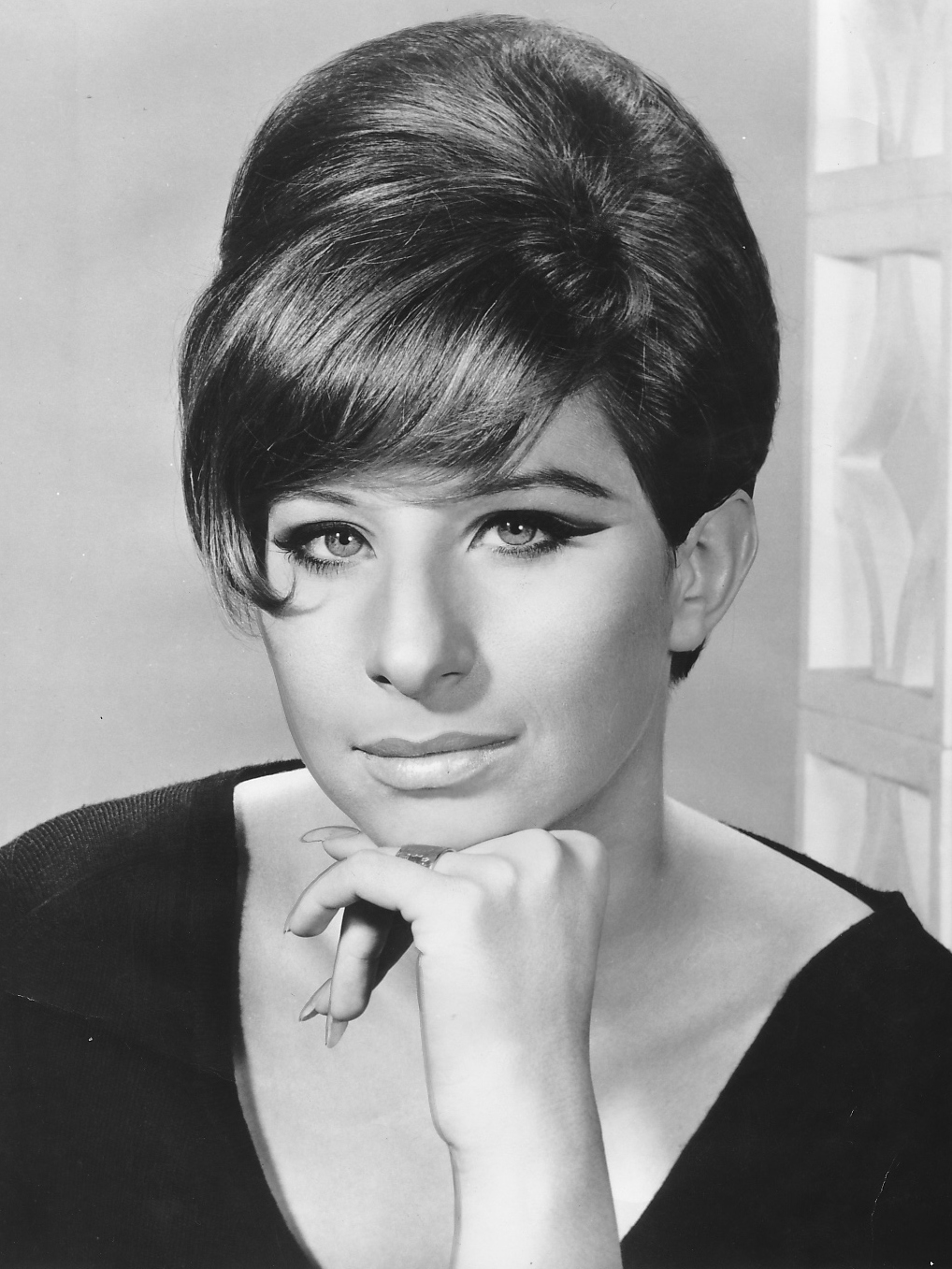
Barbra Streisand won for Funny Girl (1968), in a tie with Katharine Hepburn.

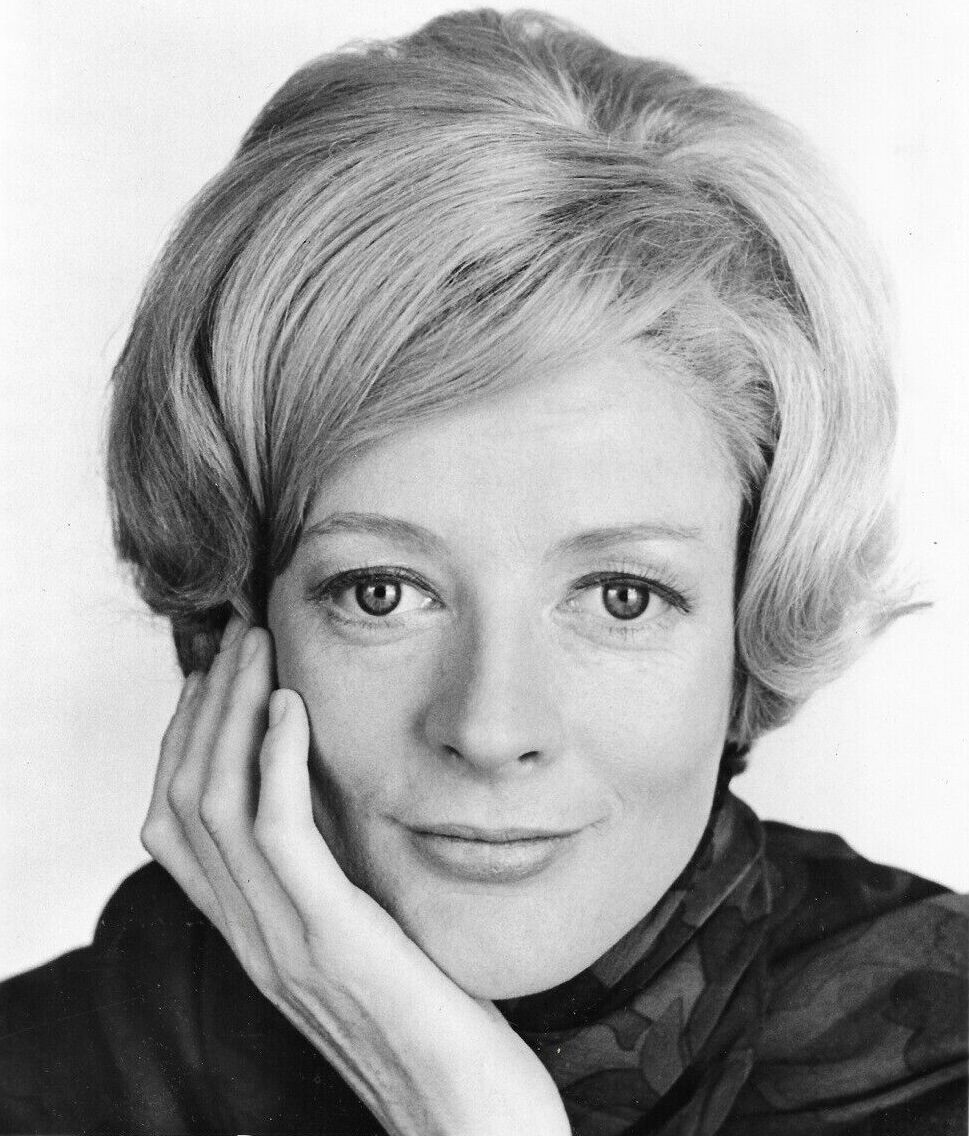
Maggie Smith won for The Prime of Miss Jean Brodie (1969).

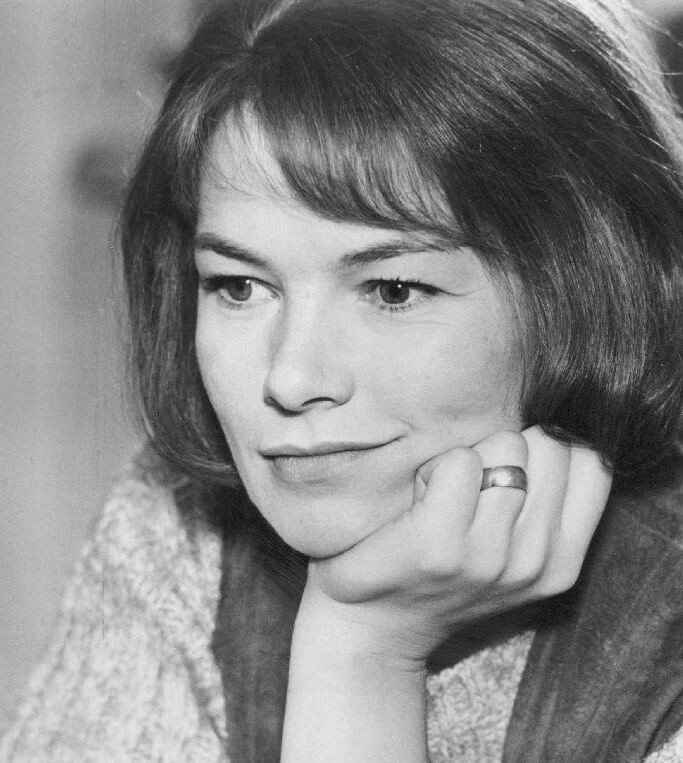
Glenda Jackson won twice, for Women in Love (1970) and A Touch of Class (1973).

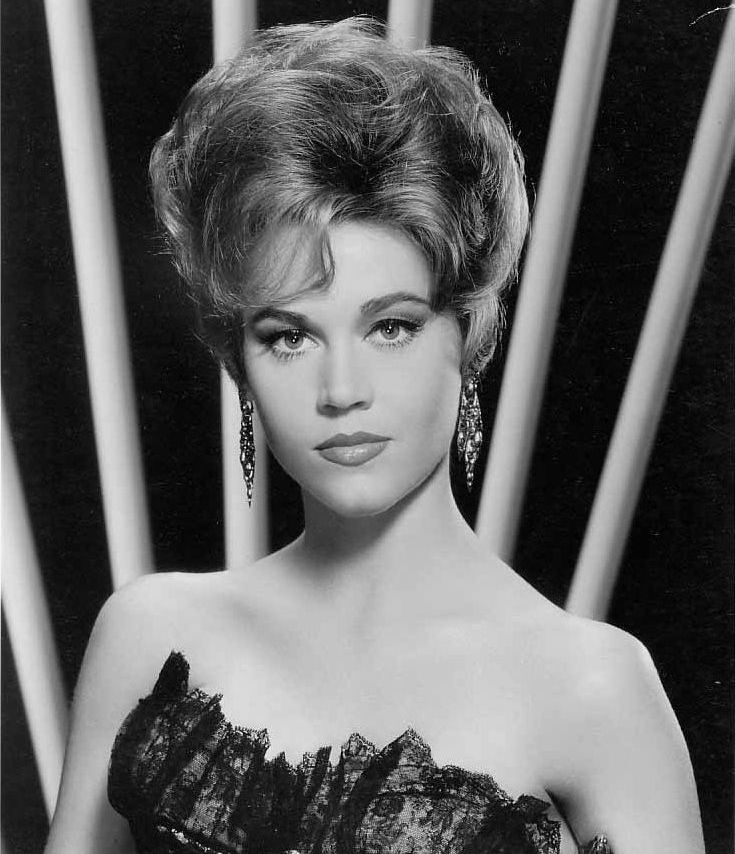
Jane Fonda won twice, for Klute (1971) and Coming Home (1978).

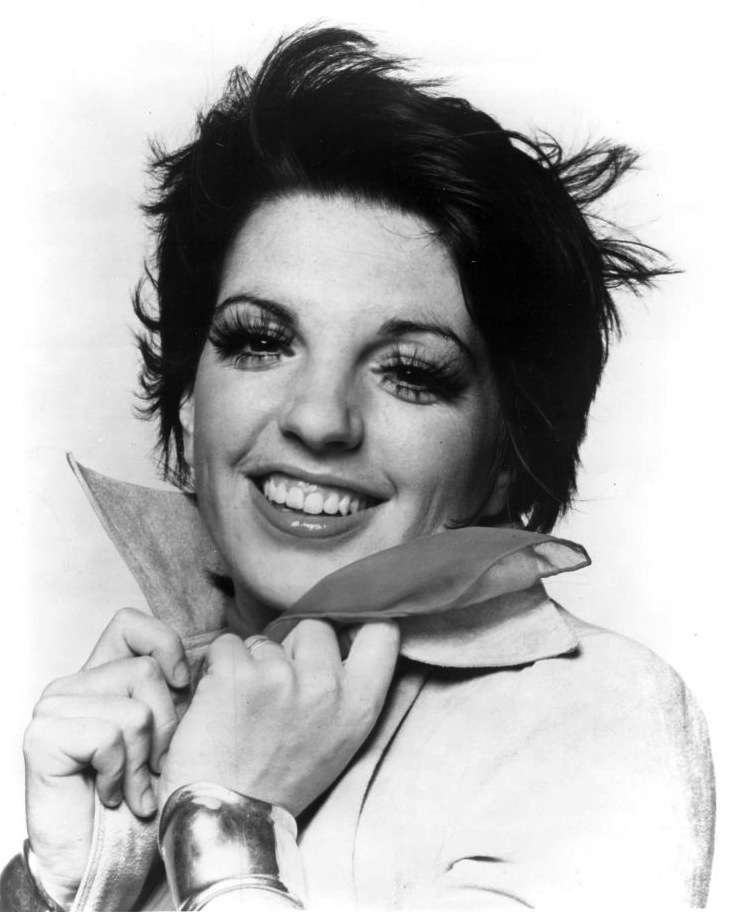
Liza Minnelli won for Cabaret (1972).

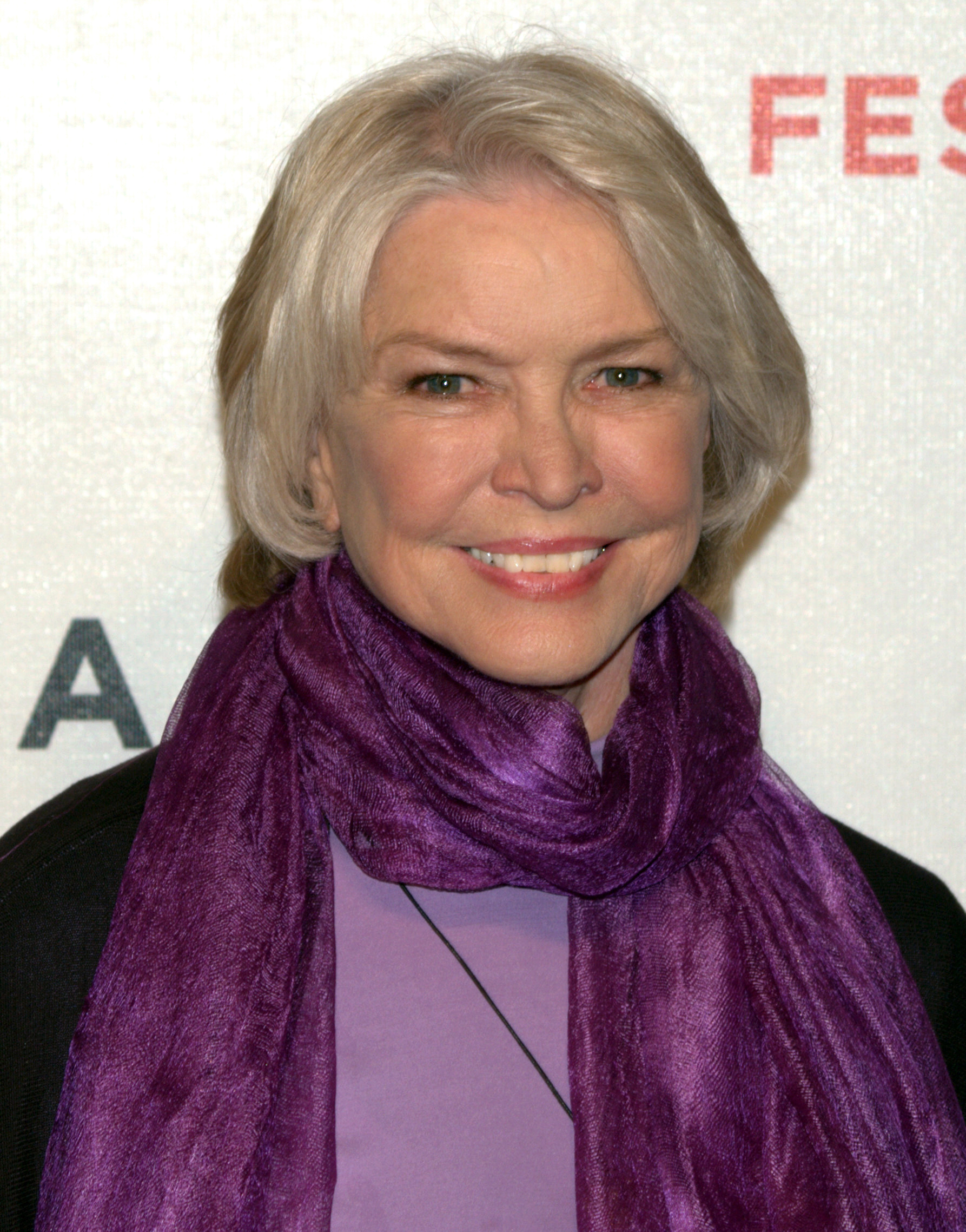
Ellen Burstyn won for Alice Doesn't Live Here Anymore (1974).

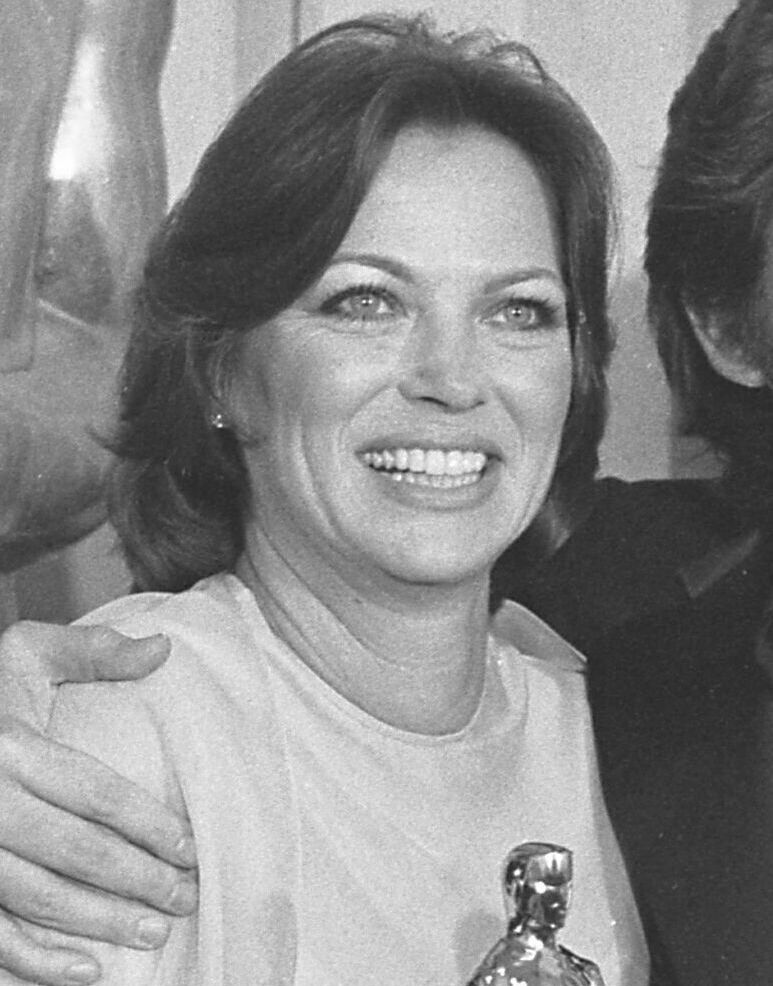
Louise Fletcher won for One Flew Over the Cuckoo's Nest (1975).

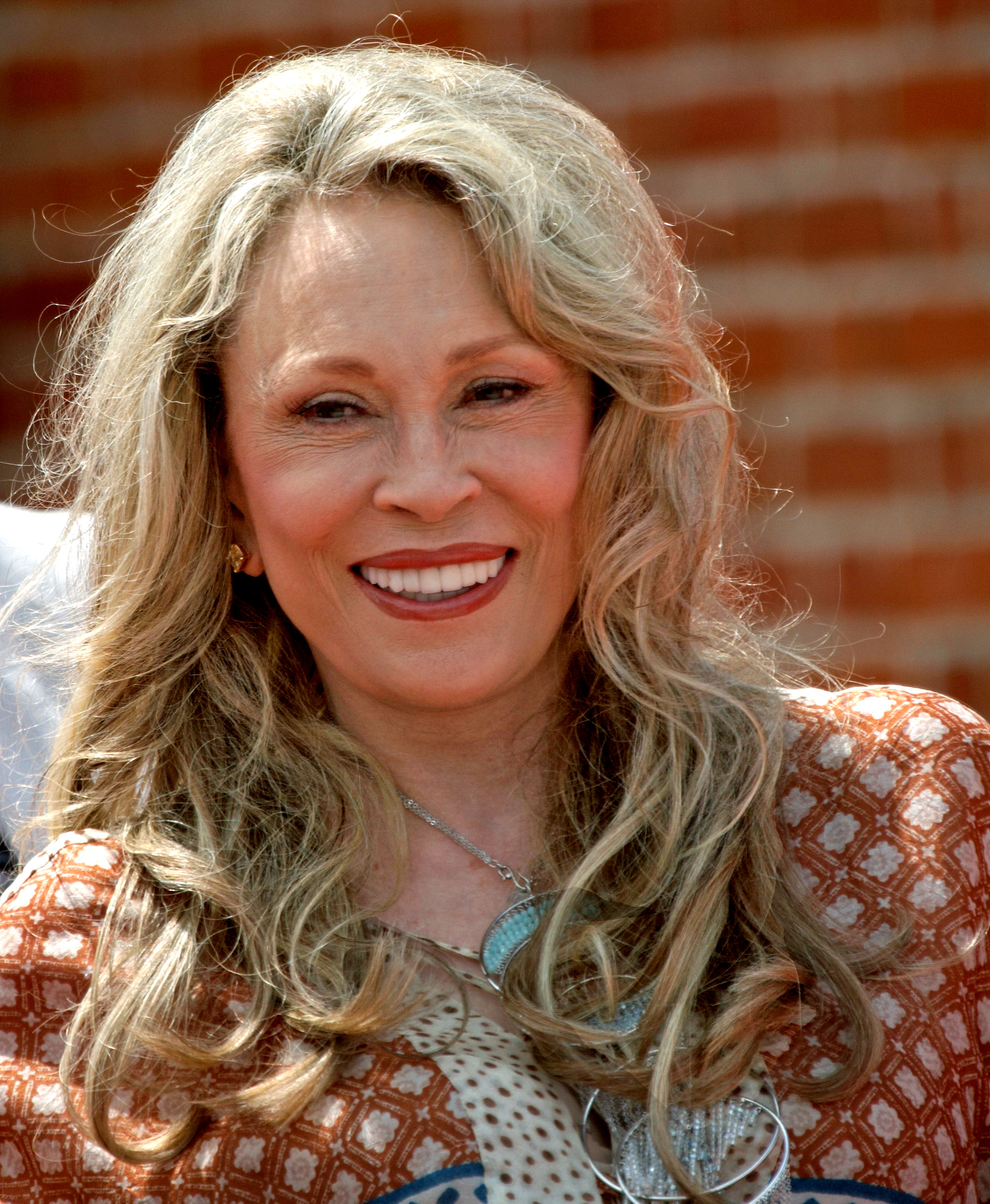
Faye Dunaway won for Network (1976).

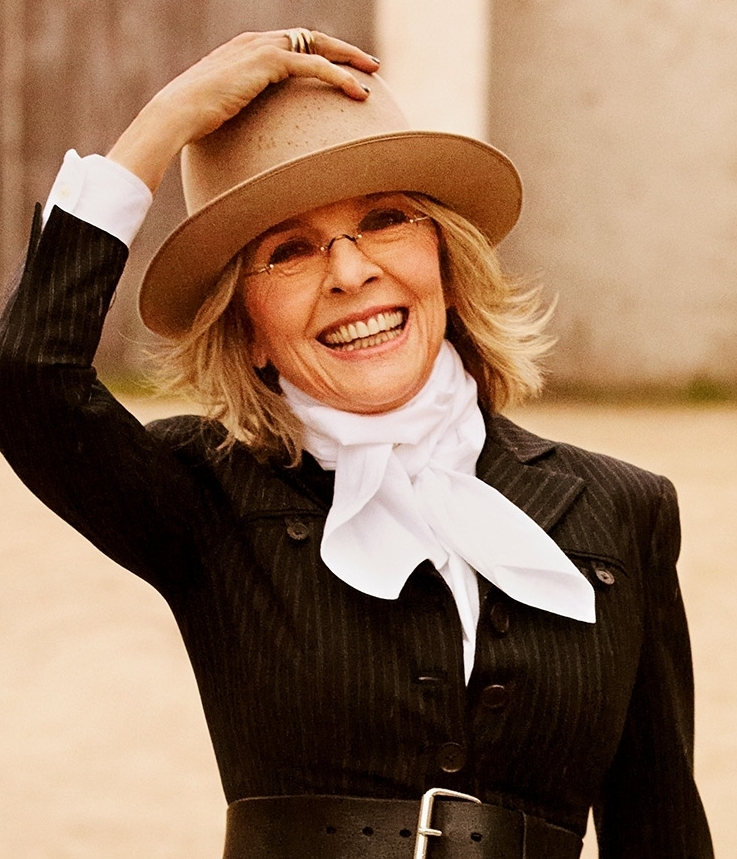
Diane Keaton won for Annie Hall (1977).

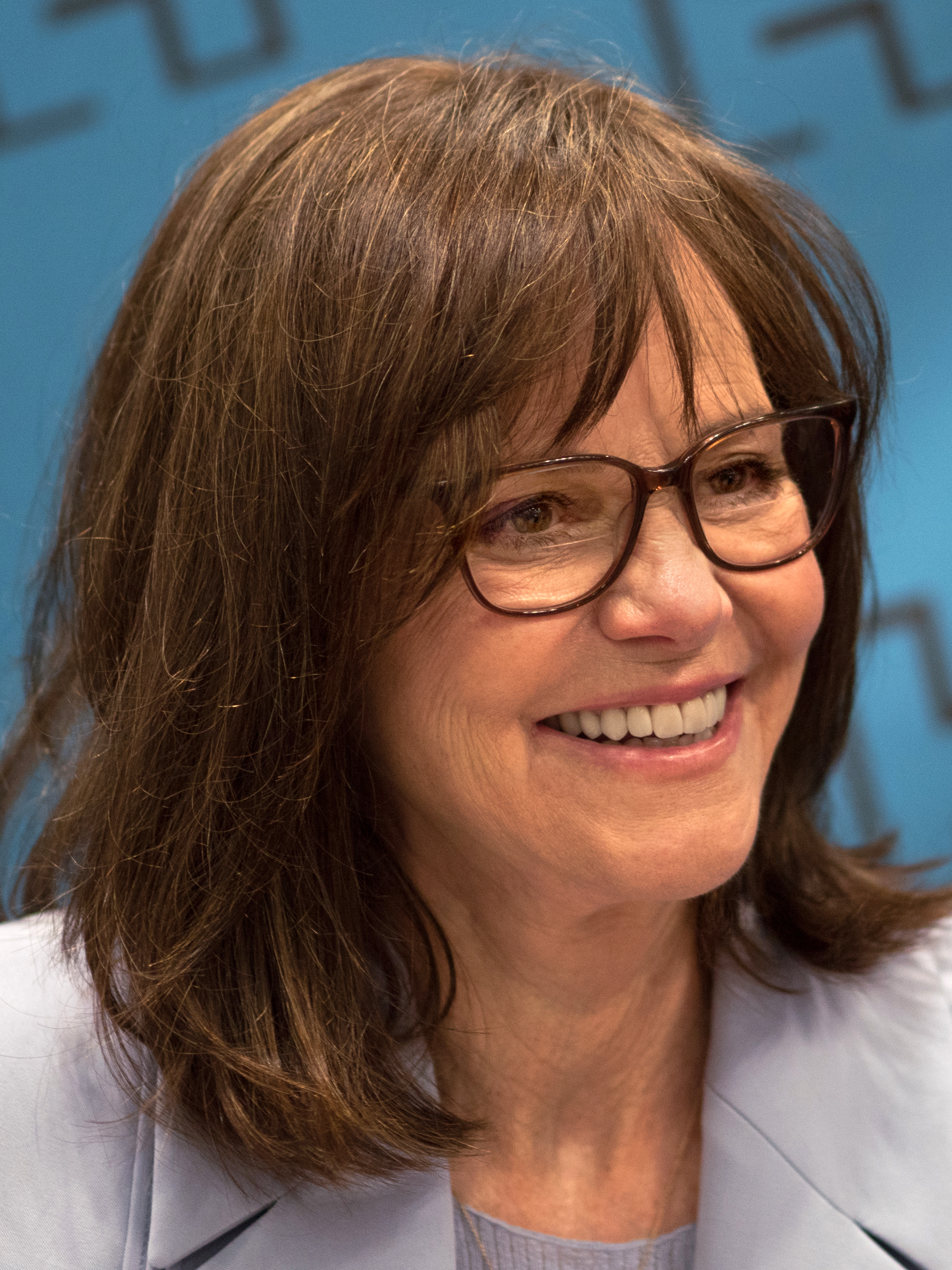
Sally Field won twice, for Norma Rae (1979) and Places in the Heart (1984).

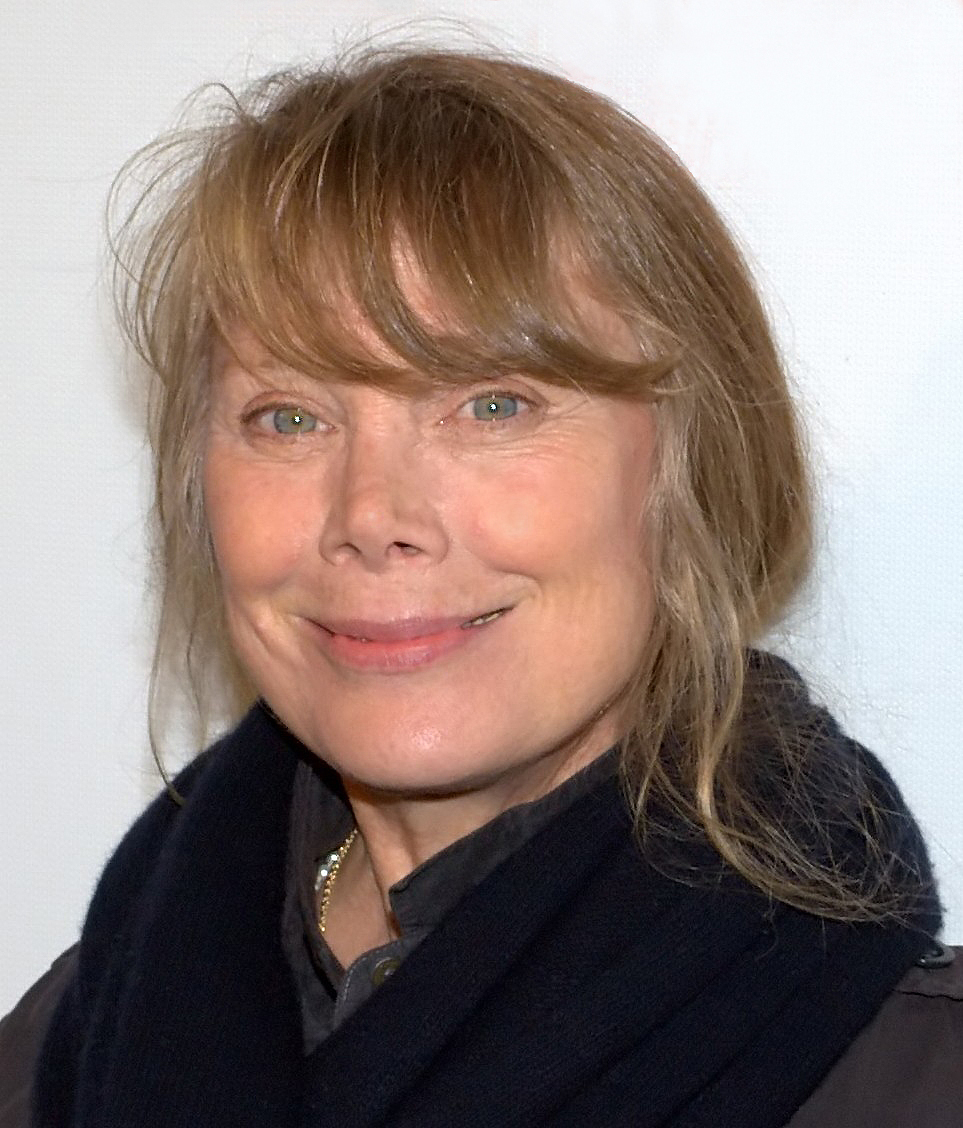
Sissy Spacek won for Coal Miner's Daughter (1980).

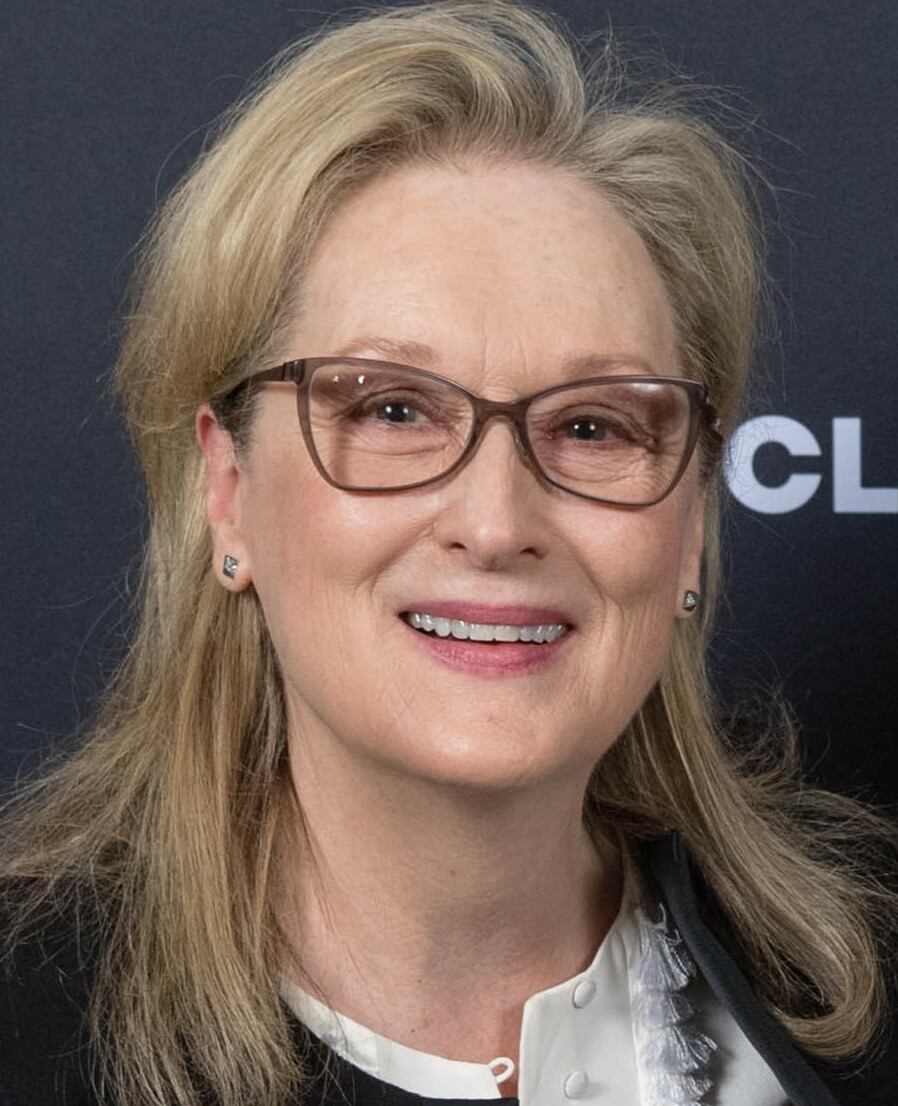
Meryl Streep won twice, for Sophie's Choice (1982) and The Iron Lady (2011).

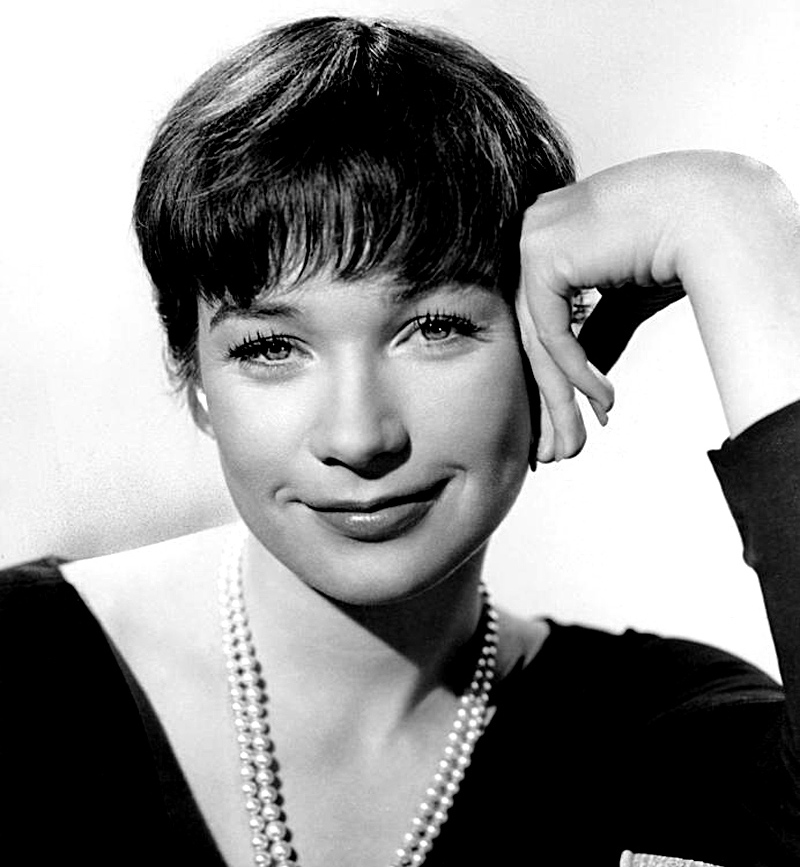
Shirley MacLaine won for Terms of Endearment (1983).

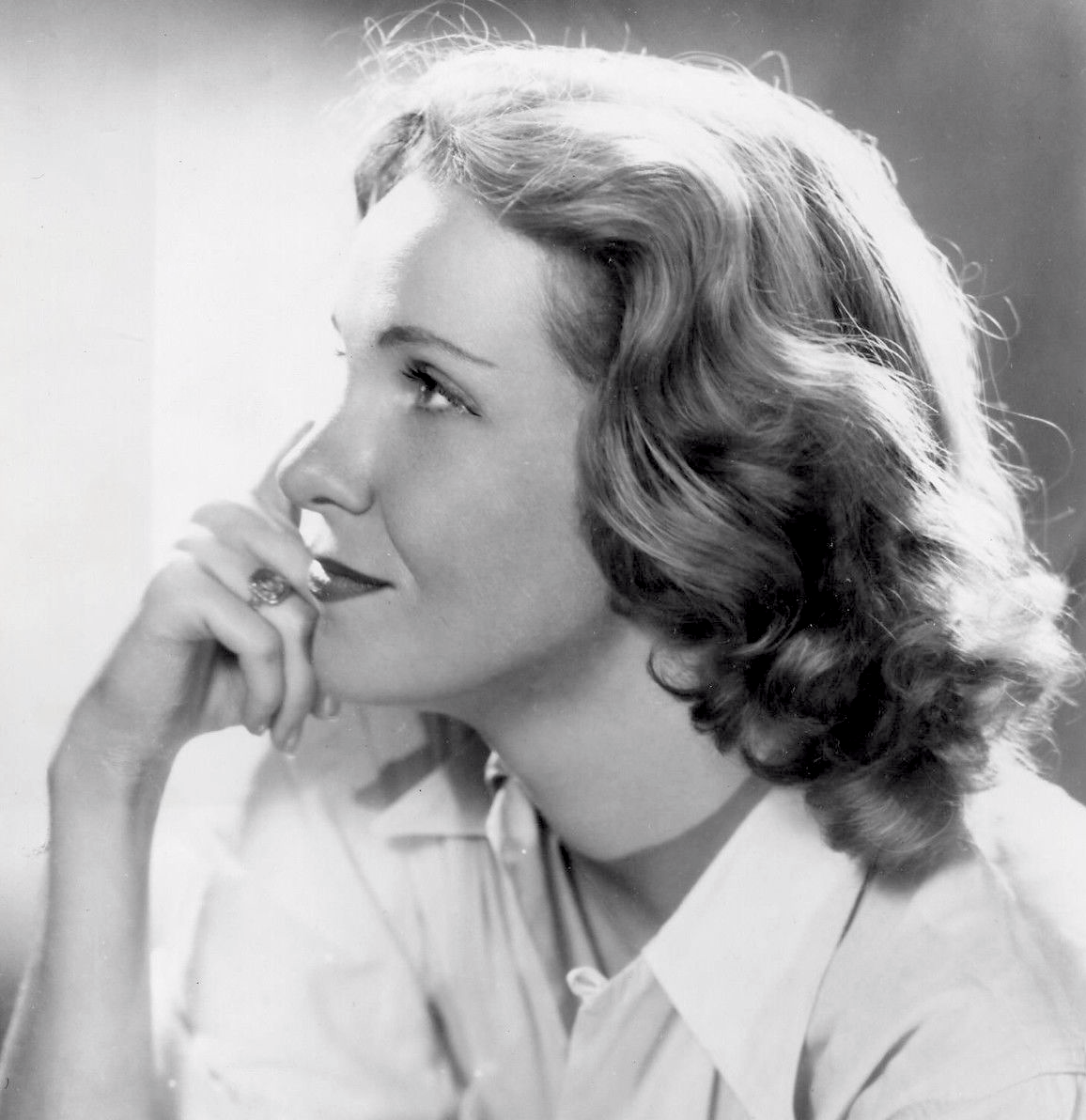
Geraldine Page won for The Trip to Bountiful (1985).

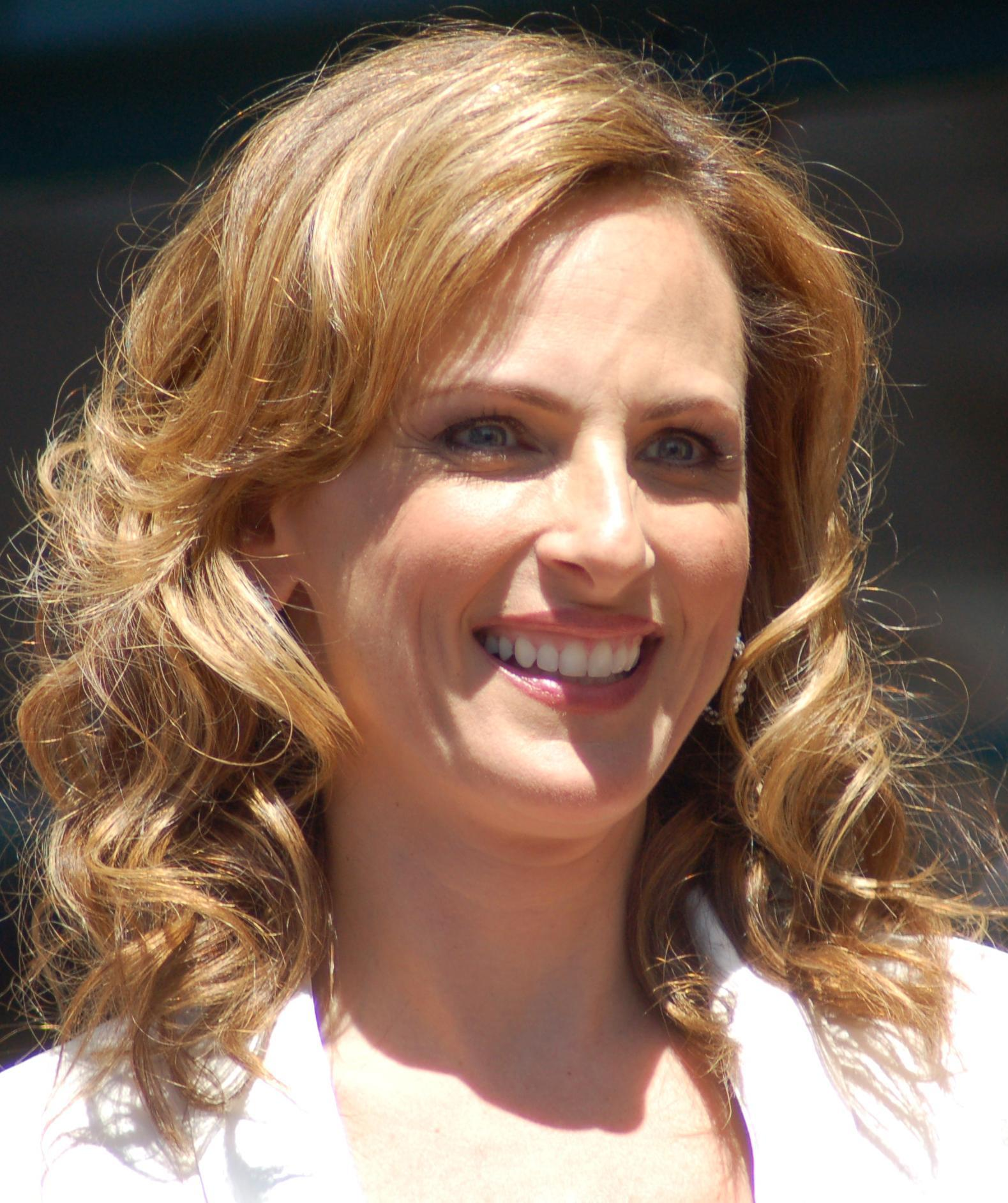
Marlee Matlin won for Children of a Lesser God (1986); first deaf, and at age 21, this category's youngest winner.

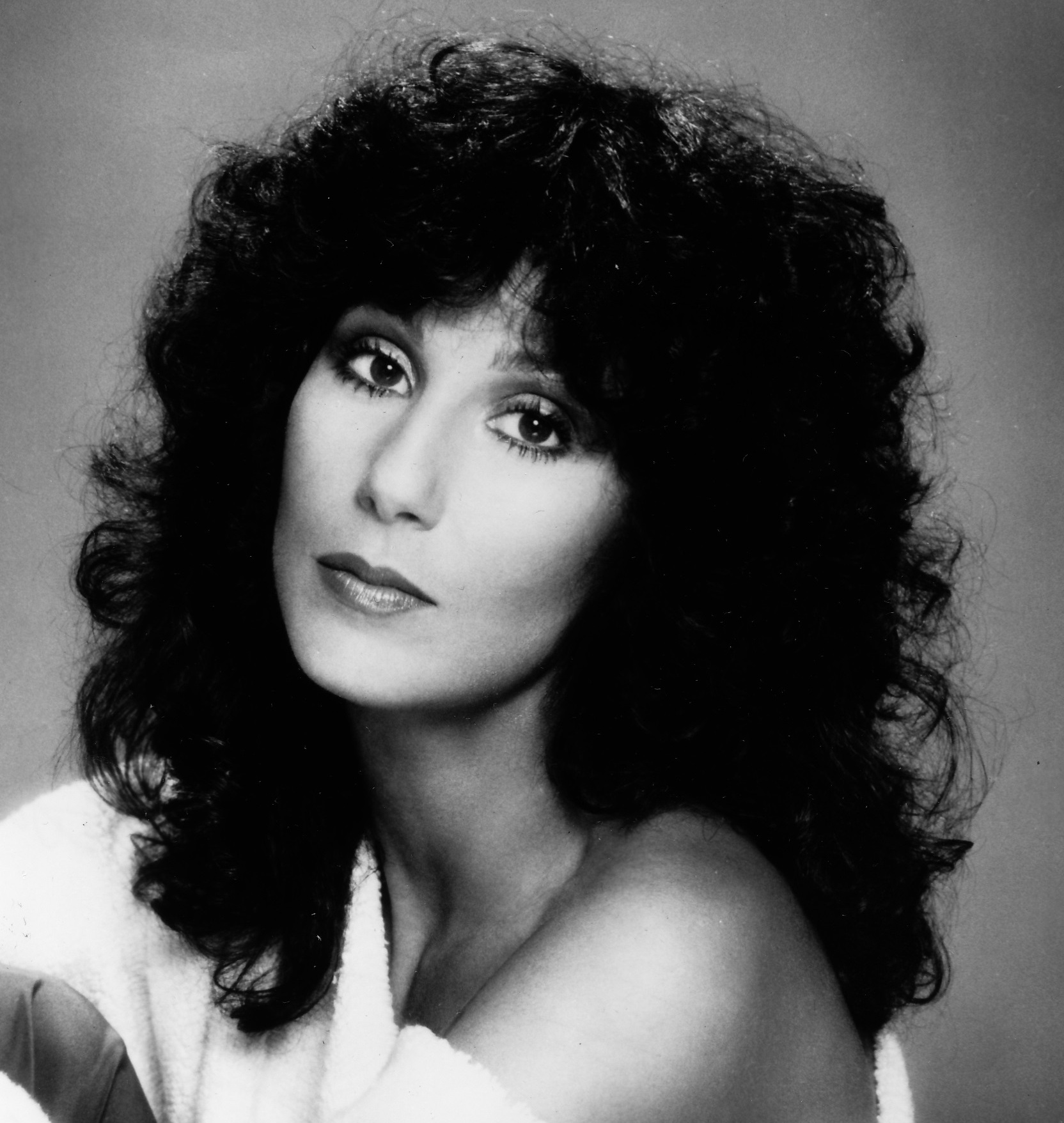
Cher won for Moonstruck (1987).

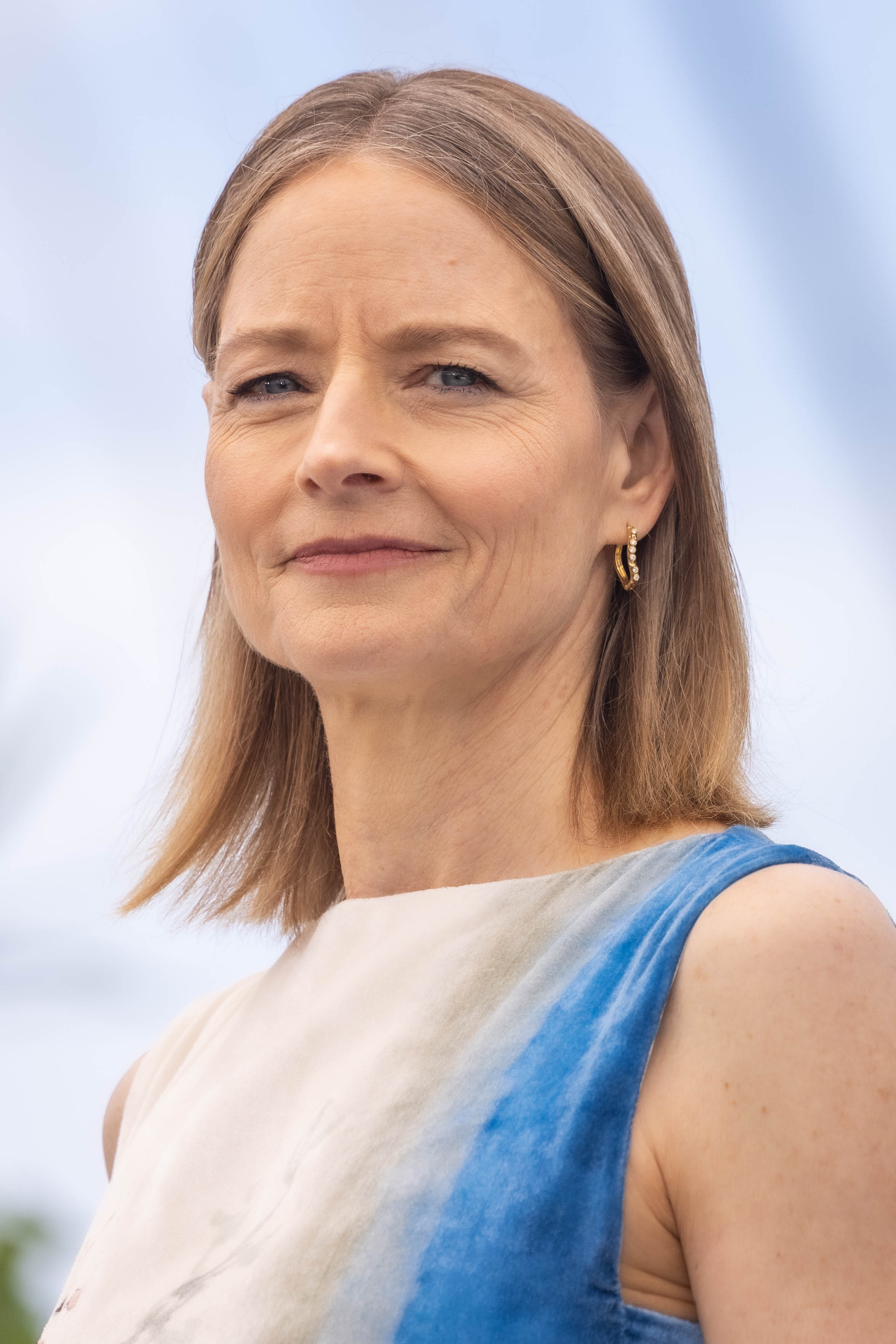
Jodie Foster won twice, for The Accused (1988) and The Silence of the Lambs (1991).

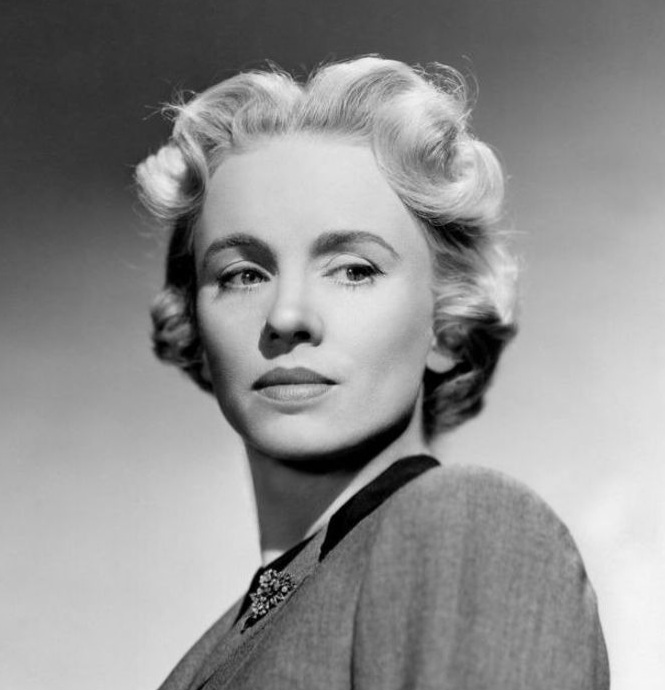
Jessica Tandy won for Driving Miss Daisy (1989); this category's oldest winner, at age 80.

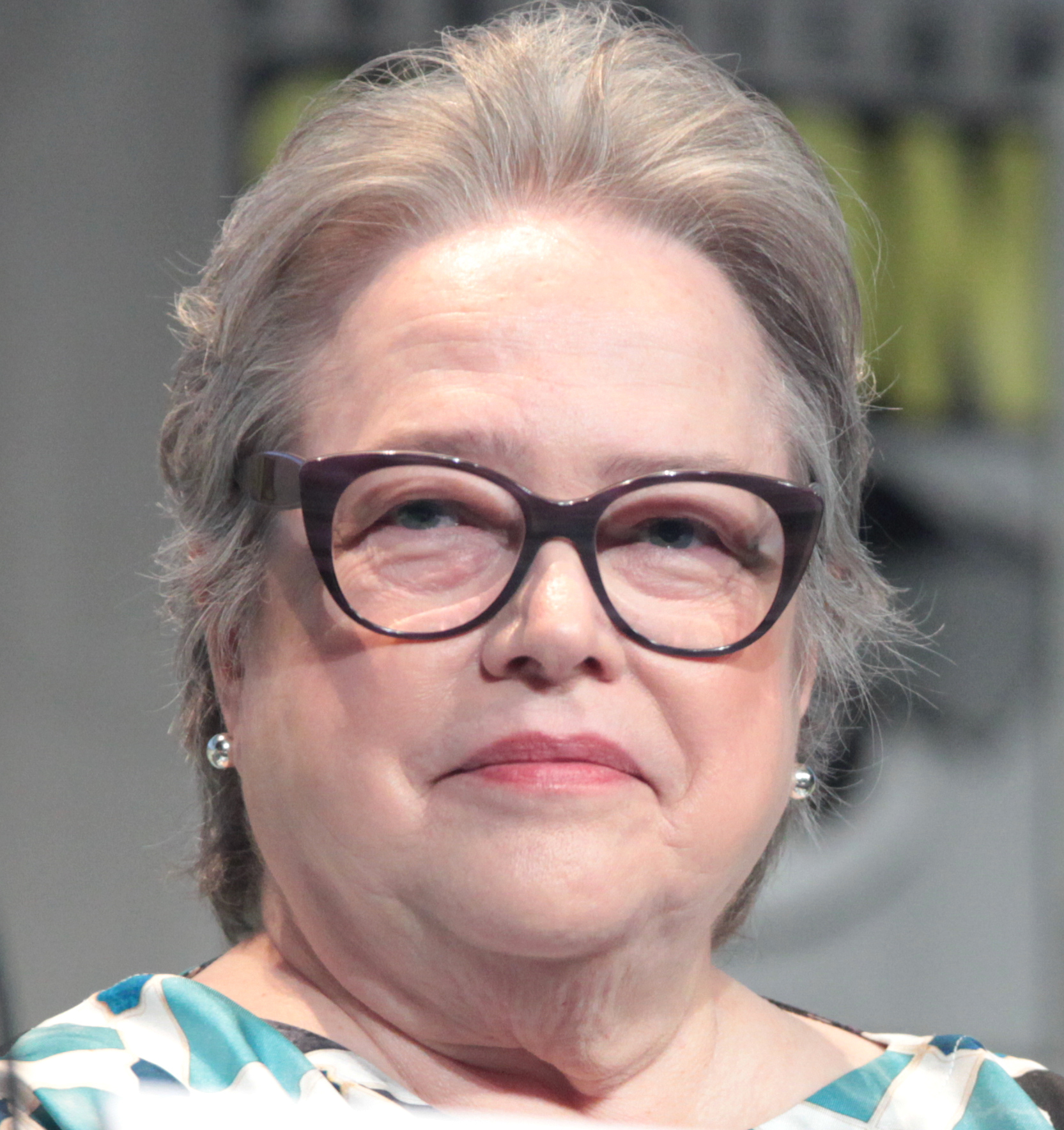
Kathy Bates won for Misery (1990).

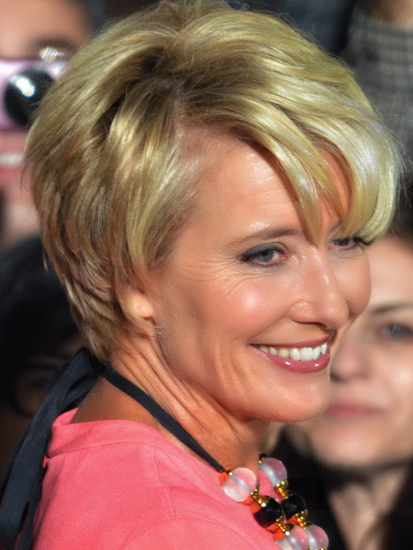
Emma Thompson won for Howards End (1992).

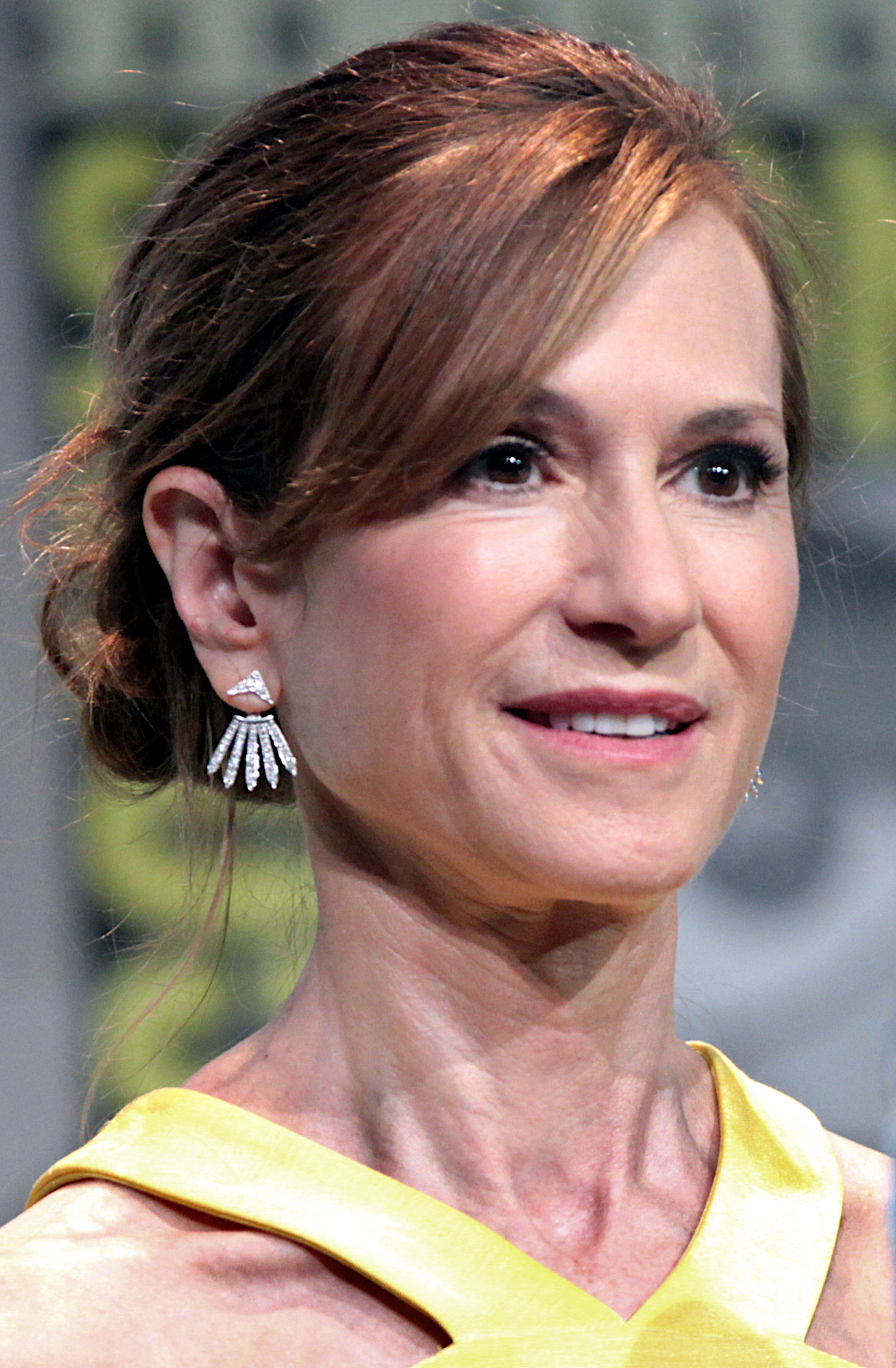
Holly Hunter won for The Piano (1993).

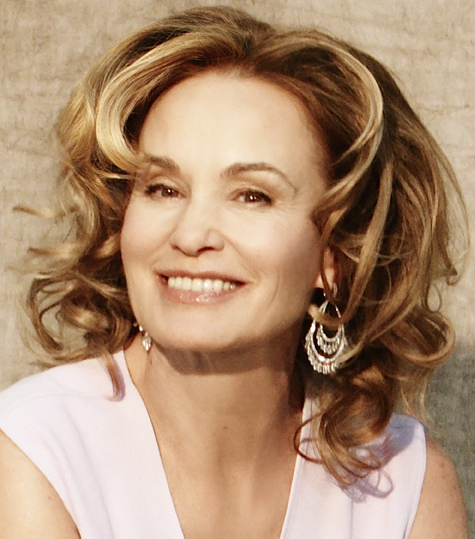
Jessica Lange won for Blue Sky (1994).

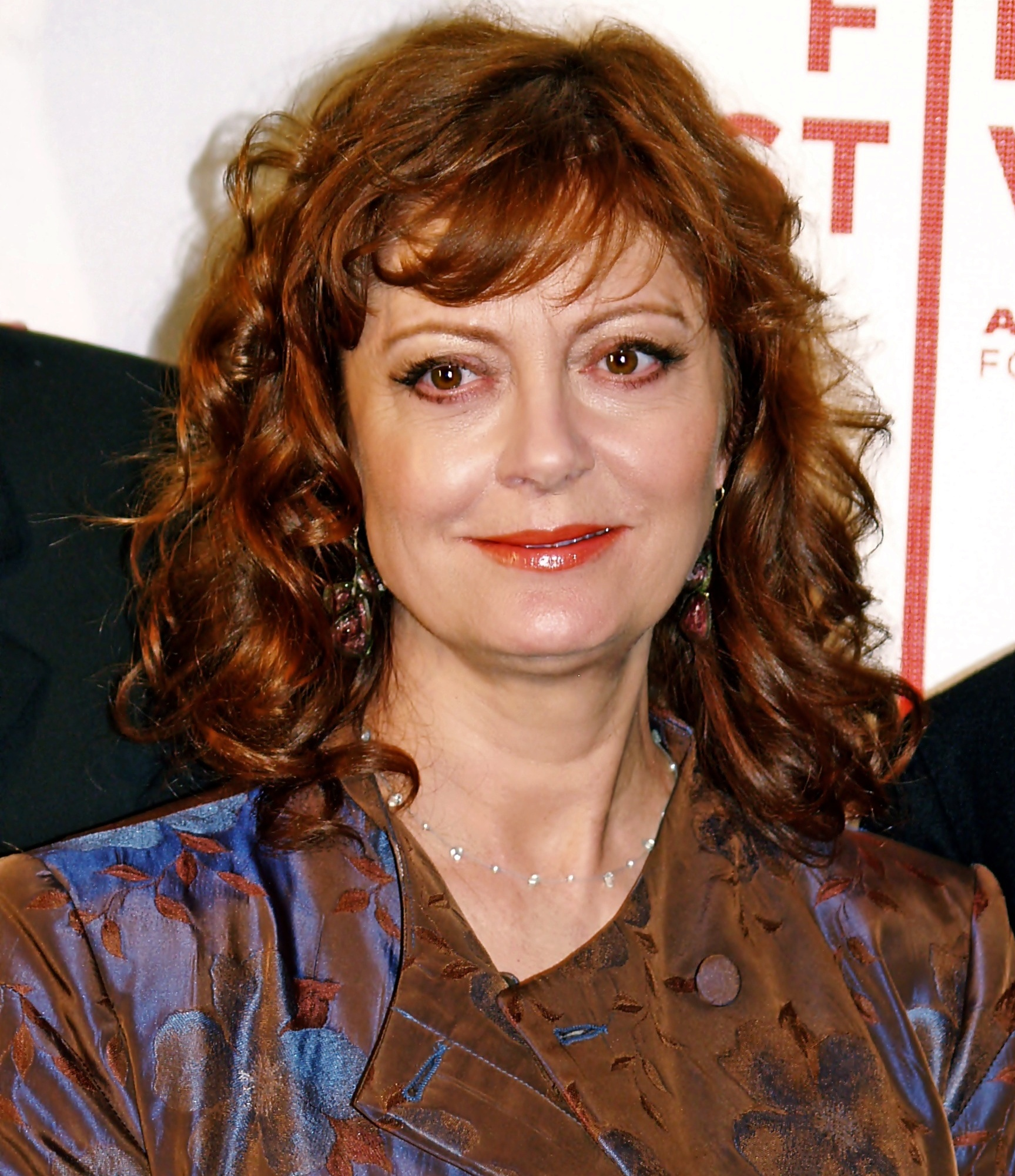
Susan Sarandon won for Dead Man Walking (1995).

Frances McDormand won thrice, for Fargo (1996), Three Billboards Outside Ebbing, Missouri (2017), and Nomadland (2020).

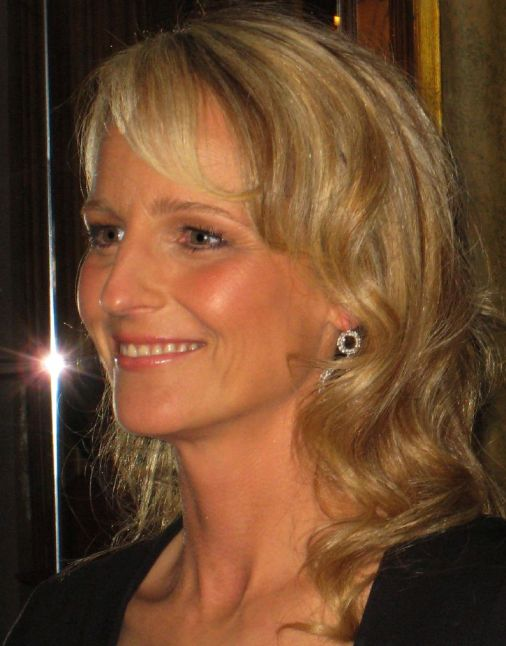
Helen Hunt won for As Good as It Gets (1997).

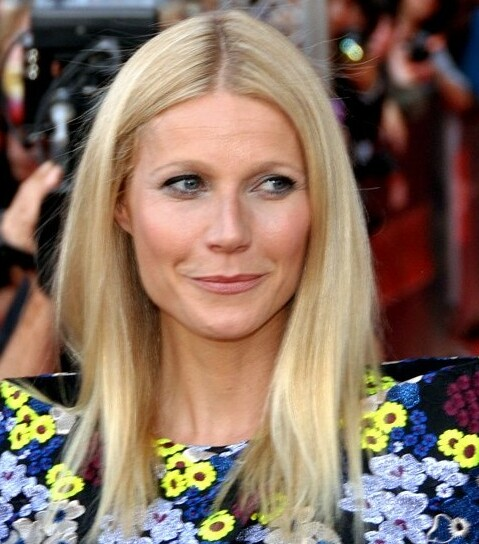
Gwyneth Paltrow won for Shakespeare in Love (1998).

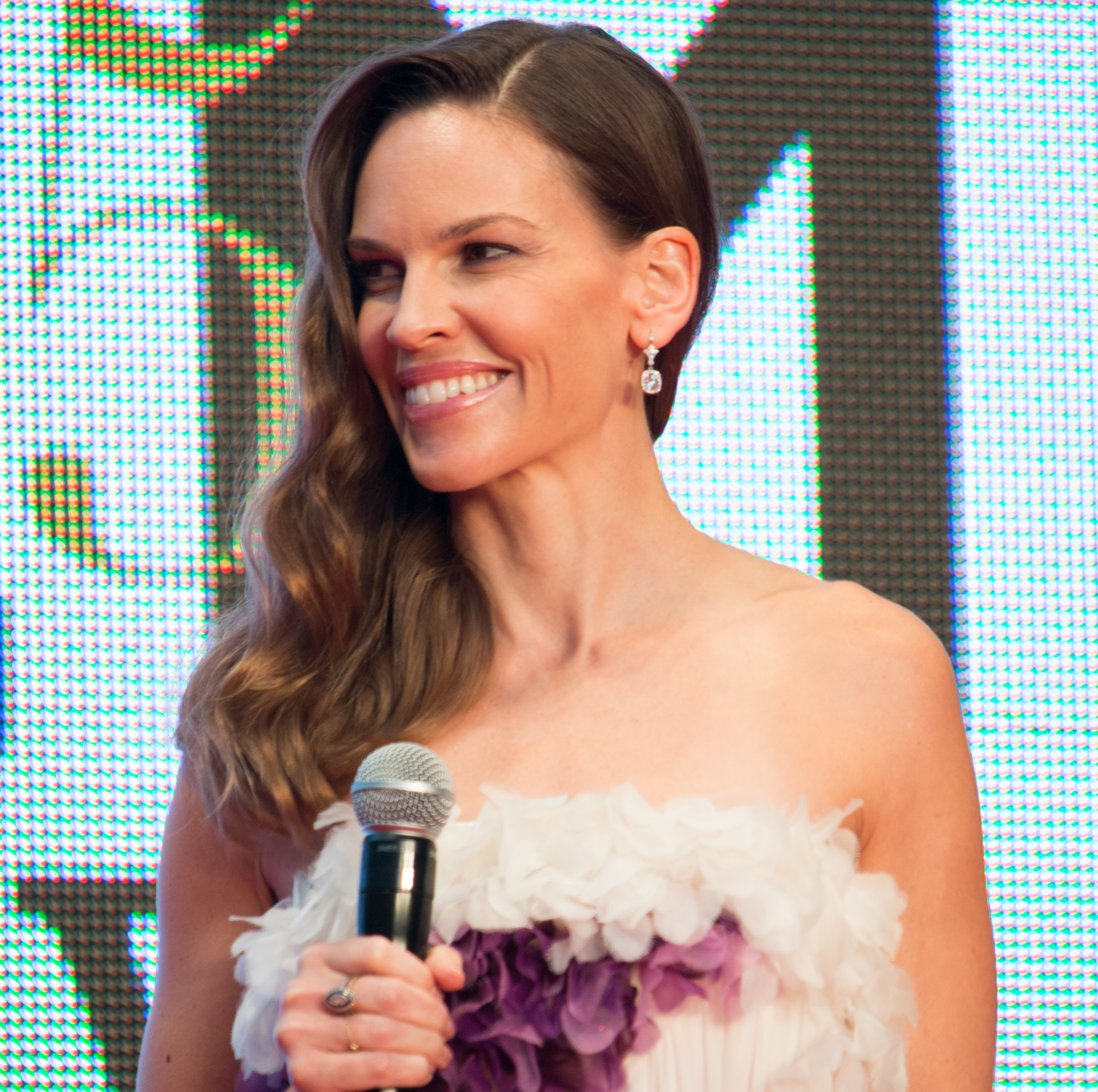
Hilary Swank won twice, for Boys Don't Cry (1999) and Million Dollar Baby (2004).

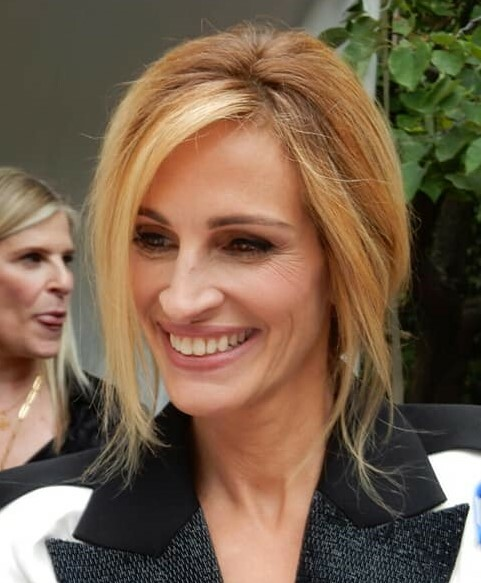
Julia Roberts won for Erin Brockovich (2000).

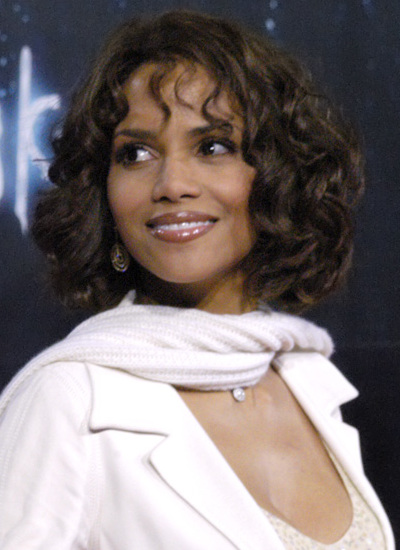
Halle Berry won for Monster's Ball (2001); first black winner in this category.

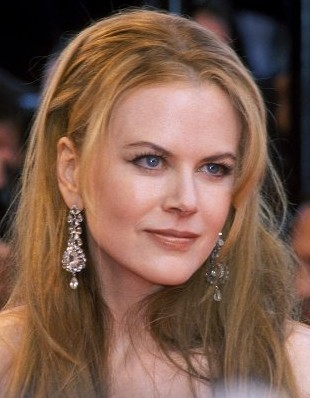
Nicole Kidman won for The Hours (2002).

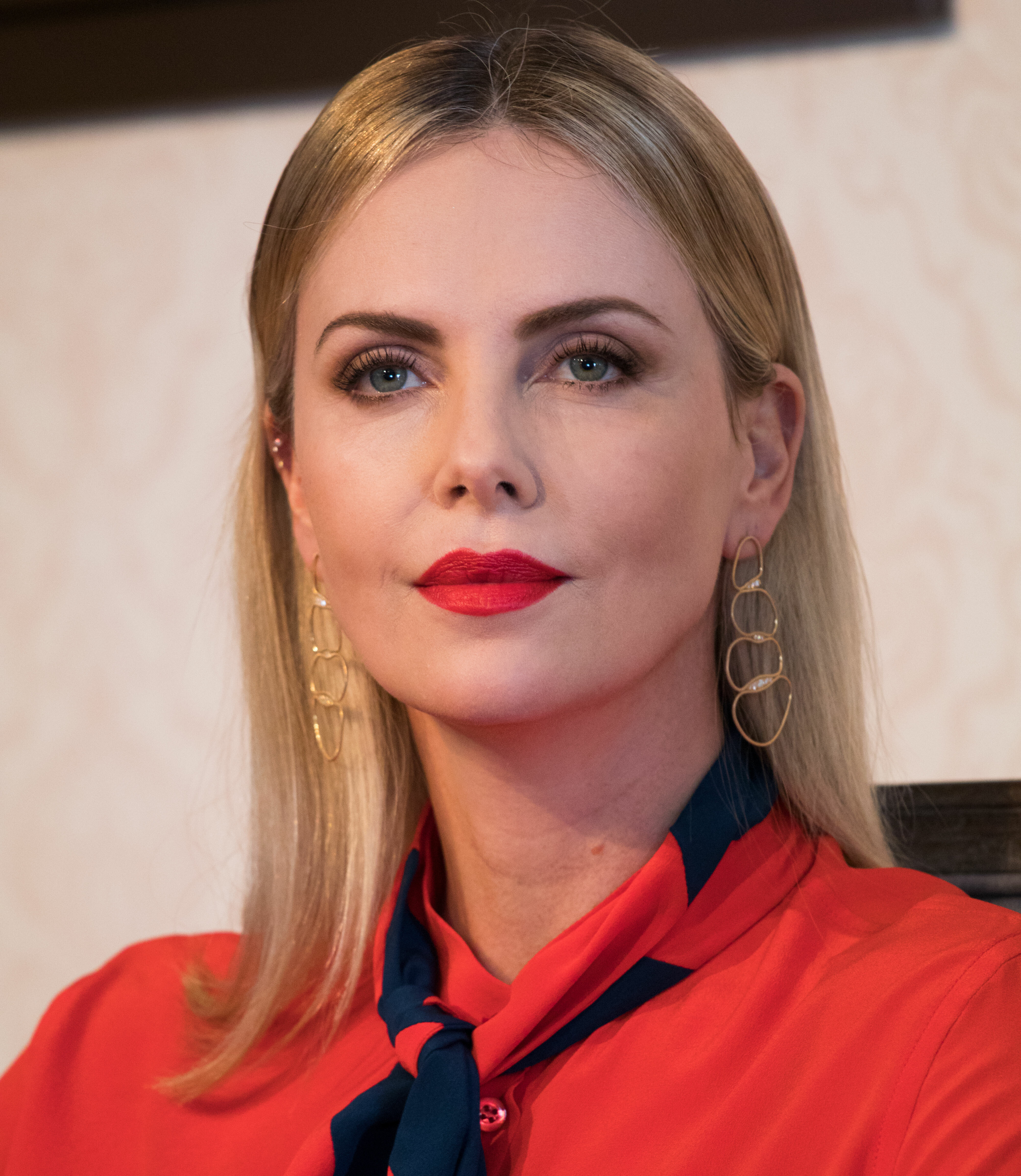
Charlize Theron won for Monster (2003).

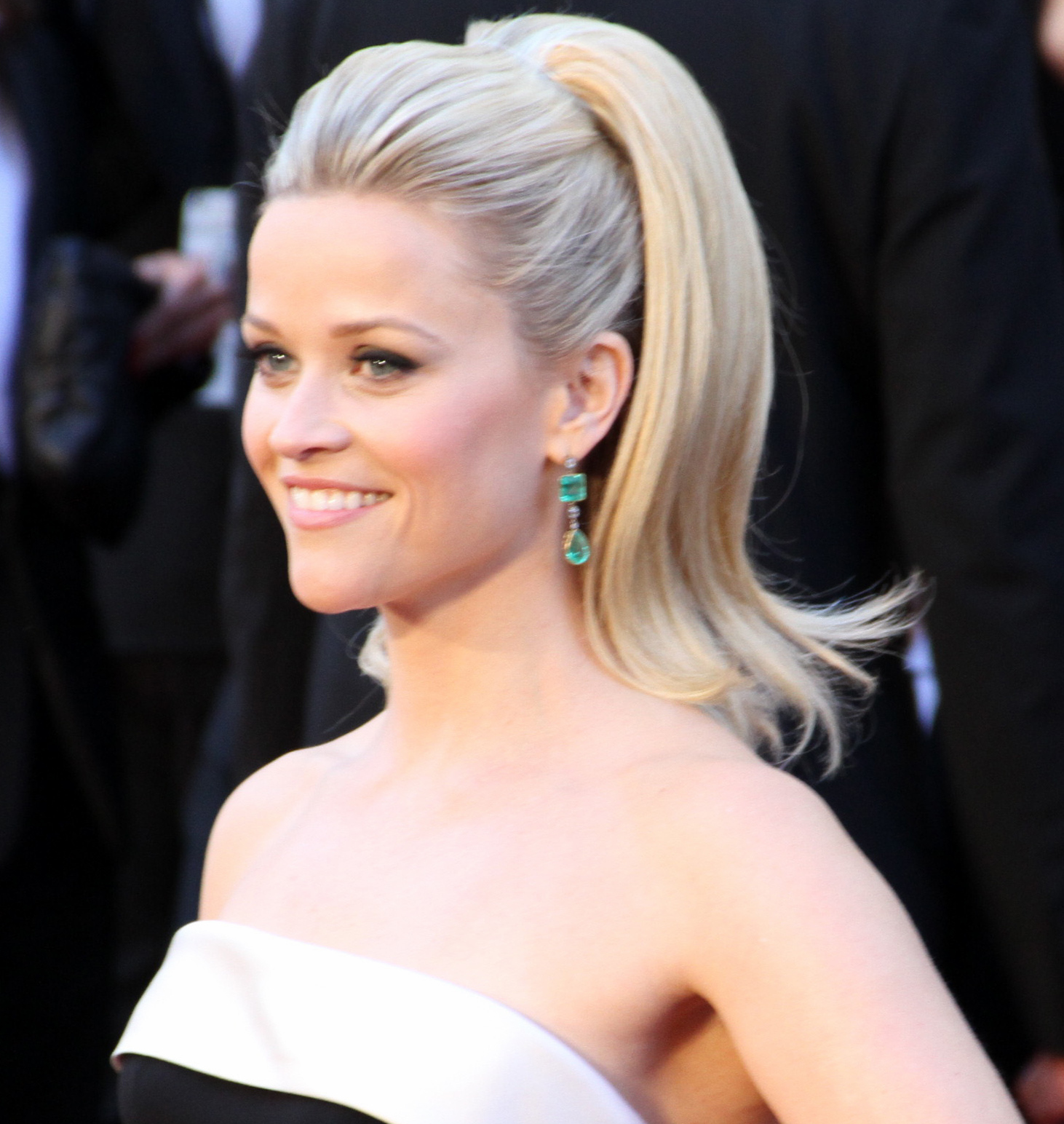
Reese Witherspoon won for Walk the Line (2005).

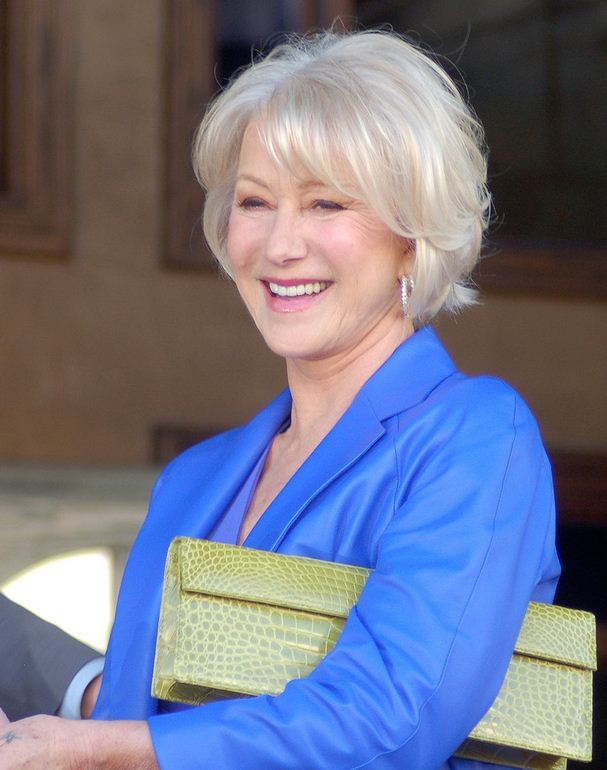
Helen Mirren won for The Queen (2006).

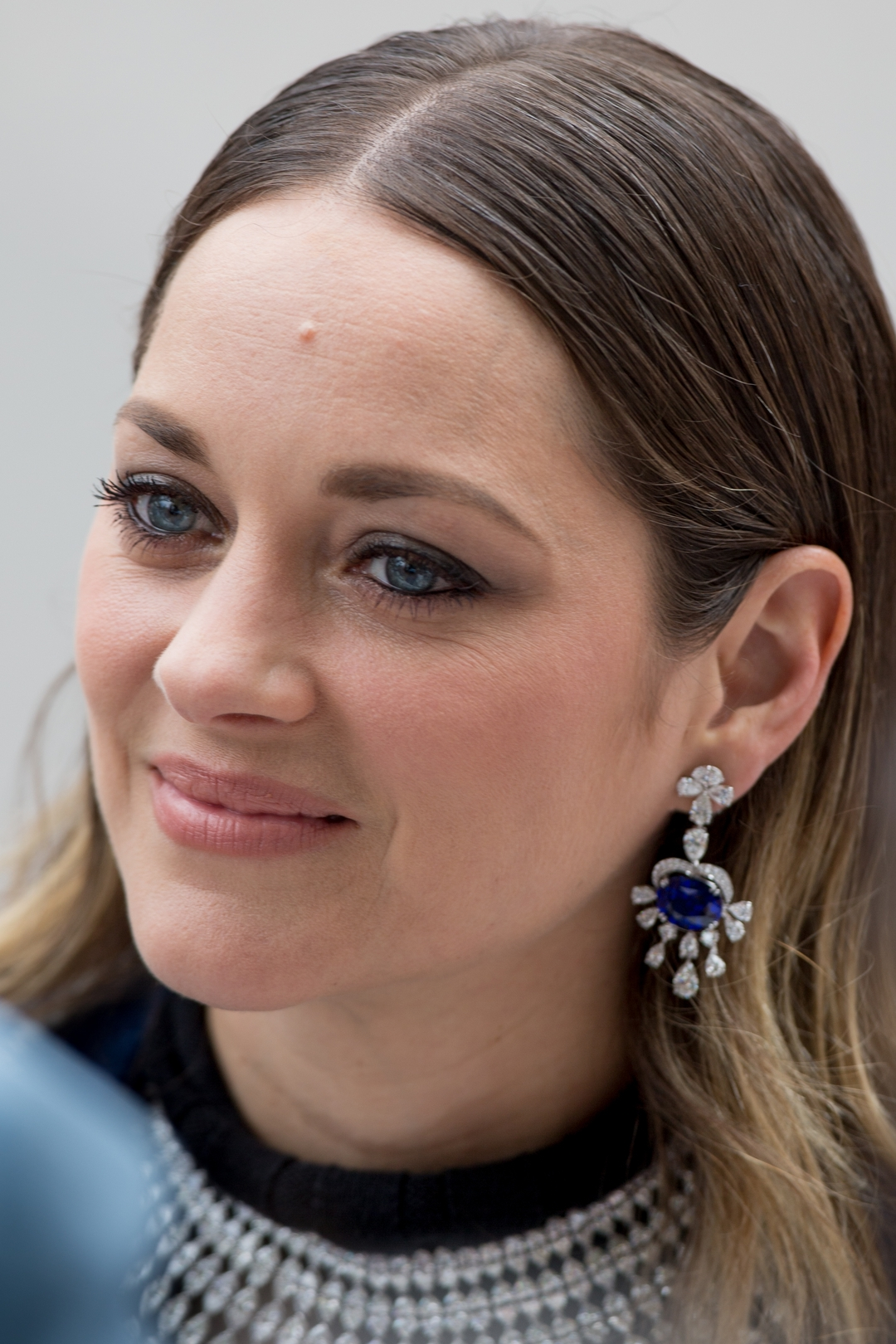
Marion Cotillard won for La Vie en Rose (2007); first French-language performance winner.

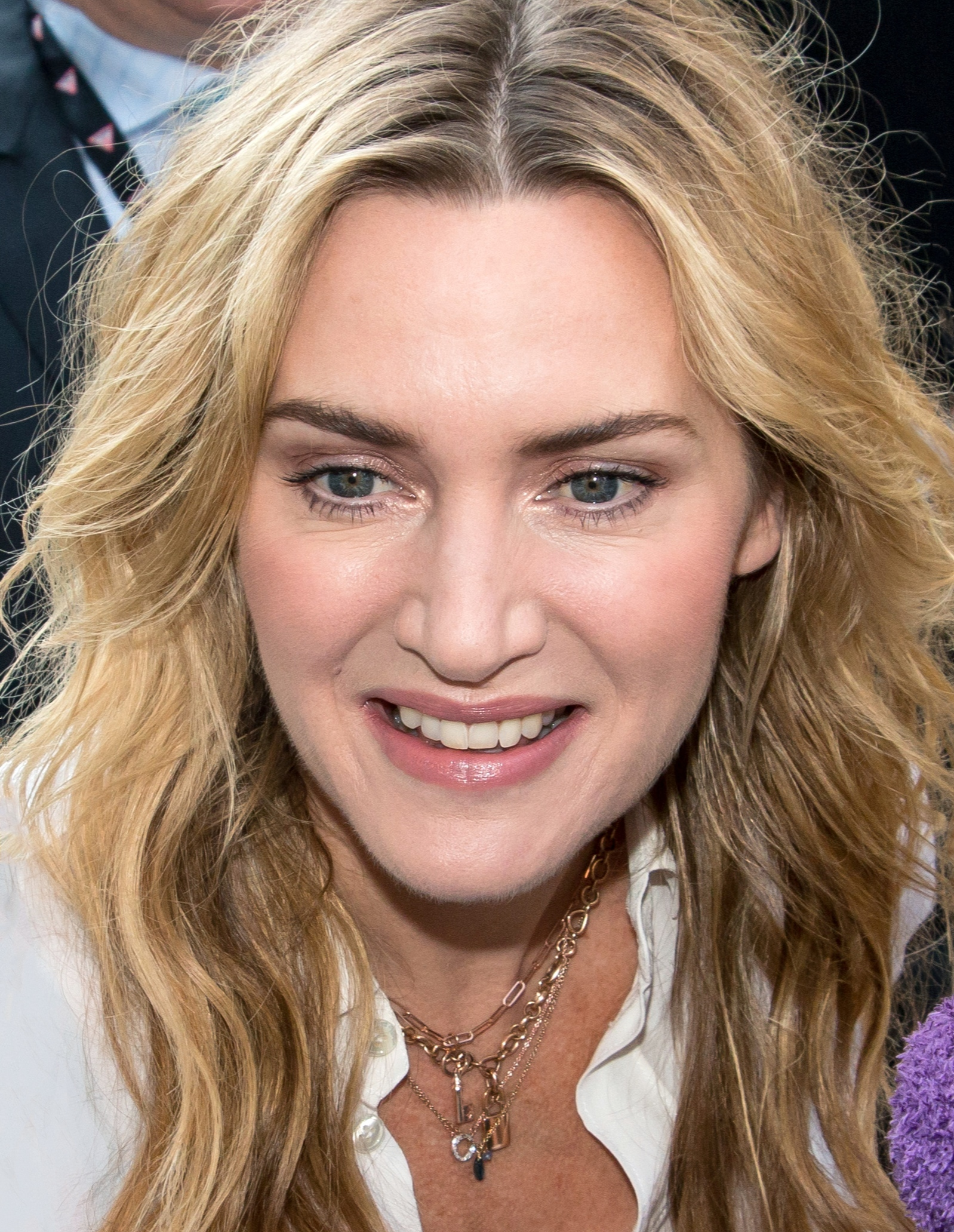
Kate Winslet won for The Reader (2008).

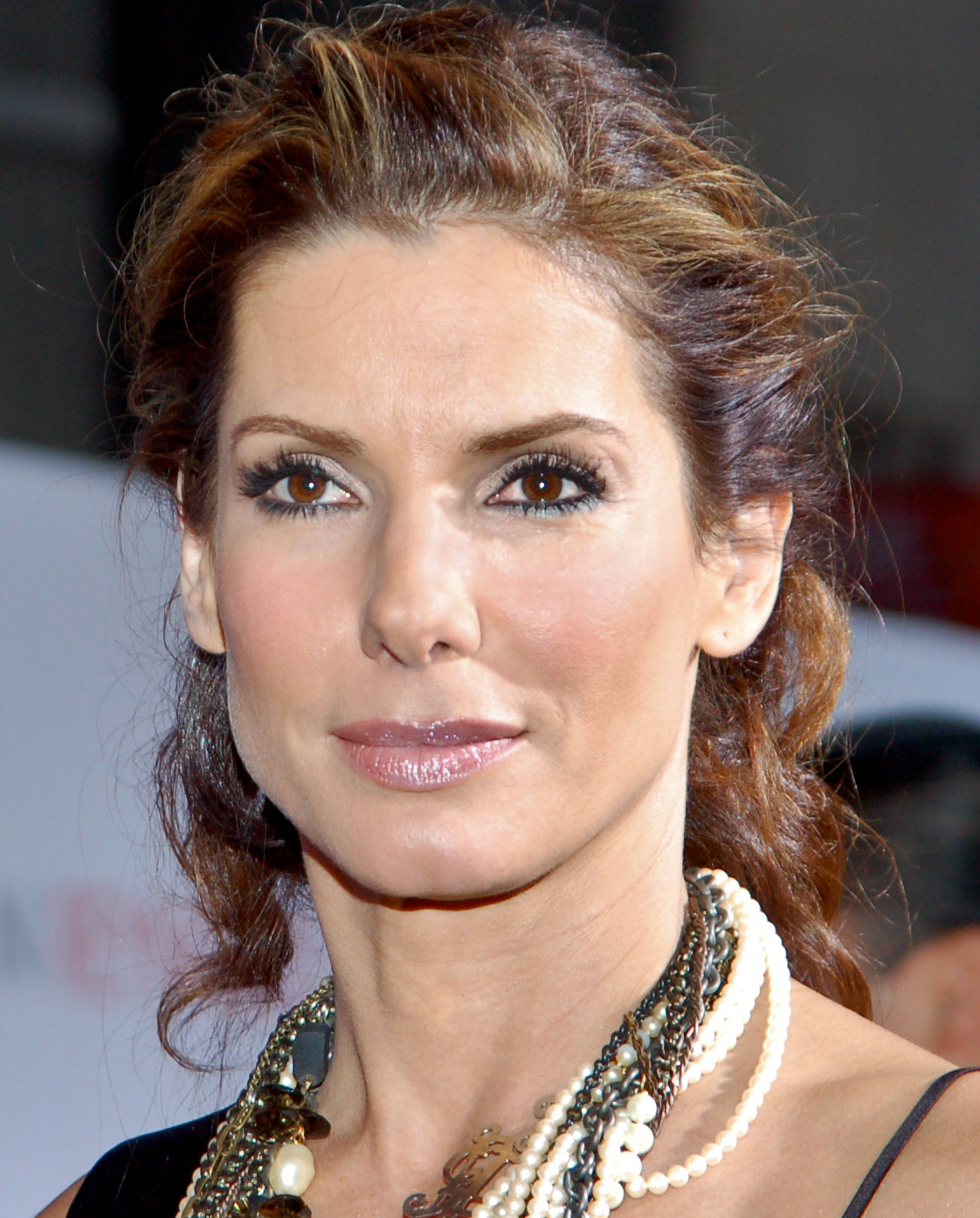
Sandra Bullock won for The Blind Side (2009).

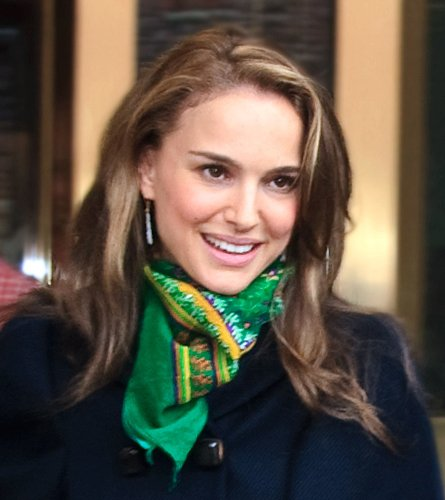
Natalie Portman won for Black Swan (2010).

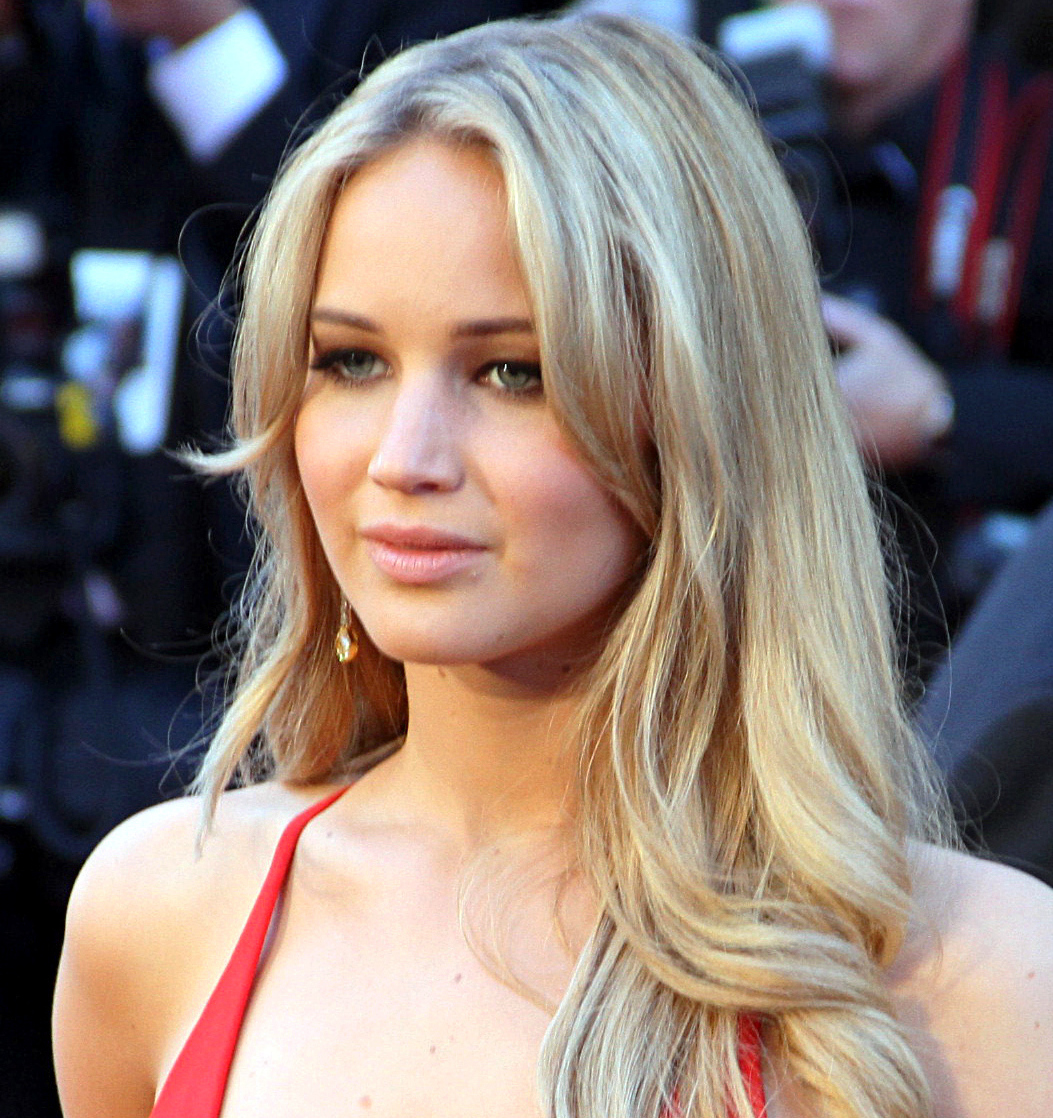
Jennifer Lawrence won for Silver Linings Playbook (2012).

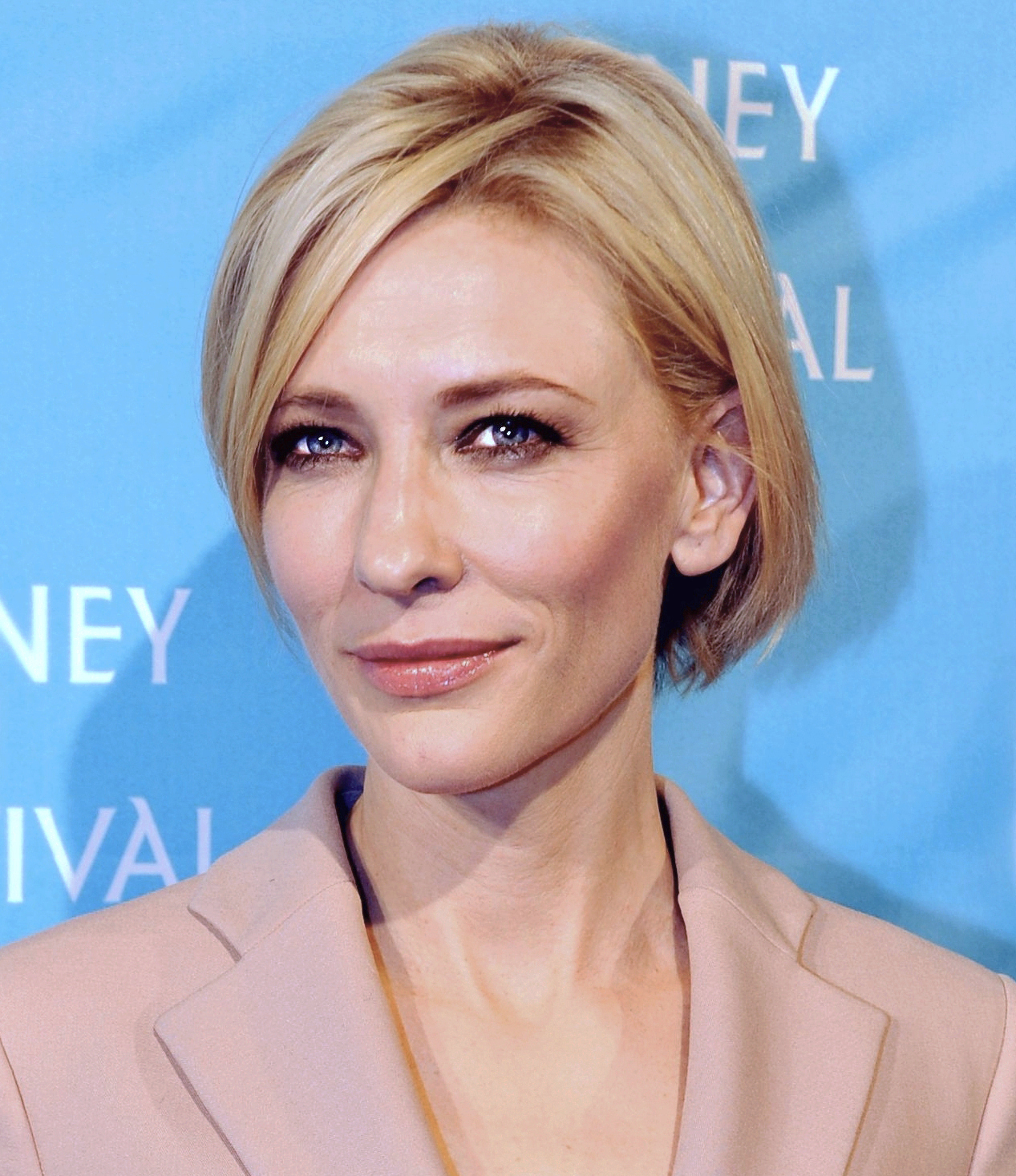
Cate Blanchett won for Blue Jasmine (2013).

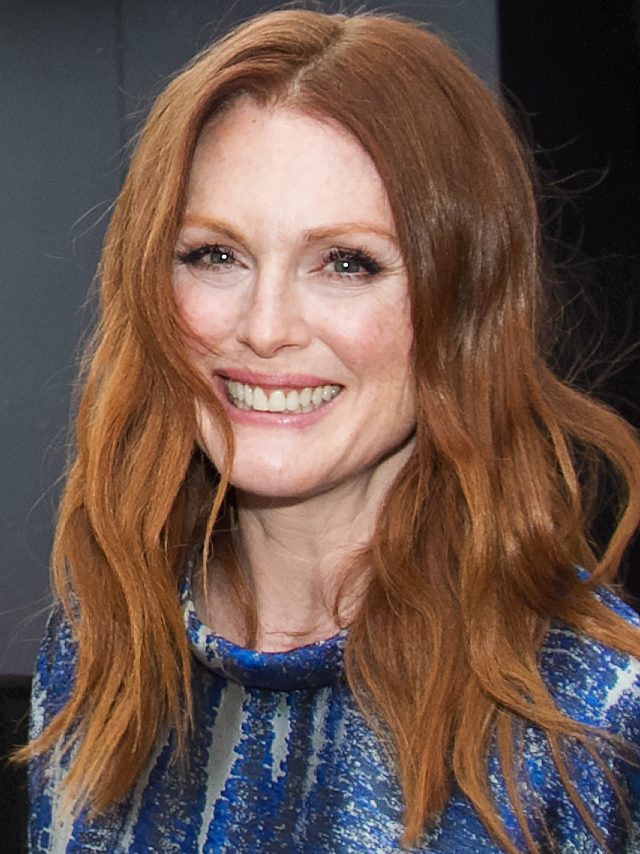
Julianne Moore won for Still Alice (2014).

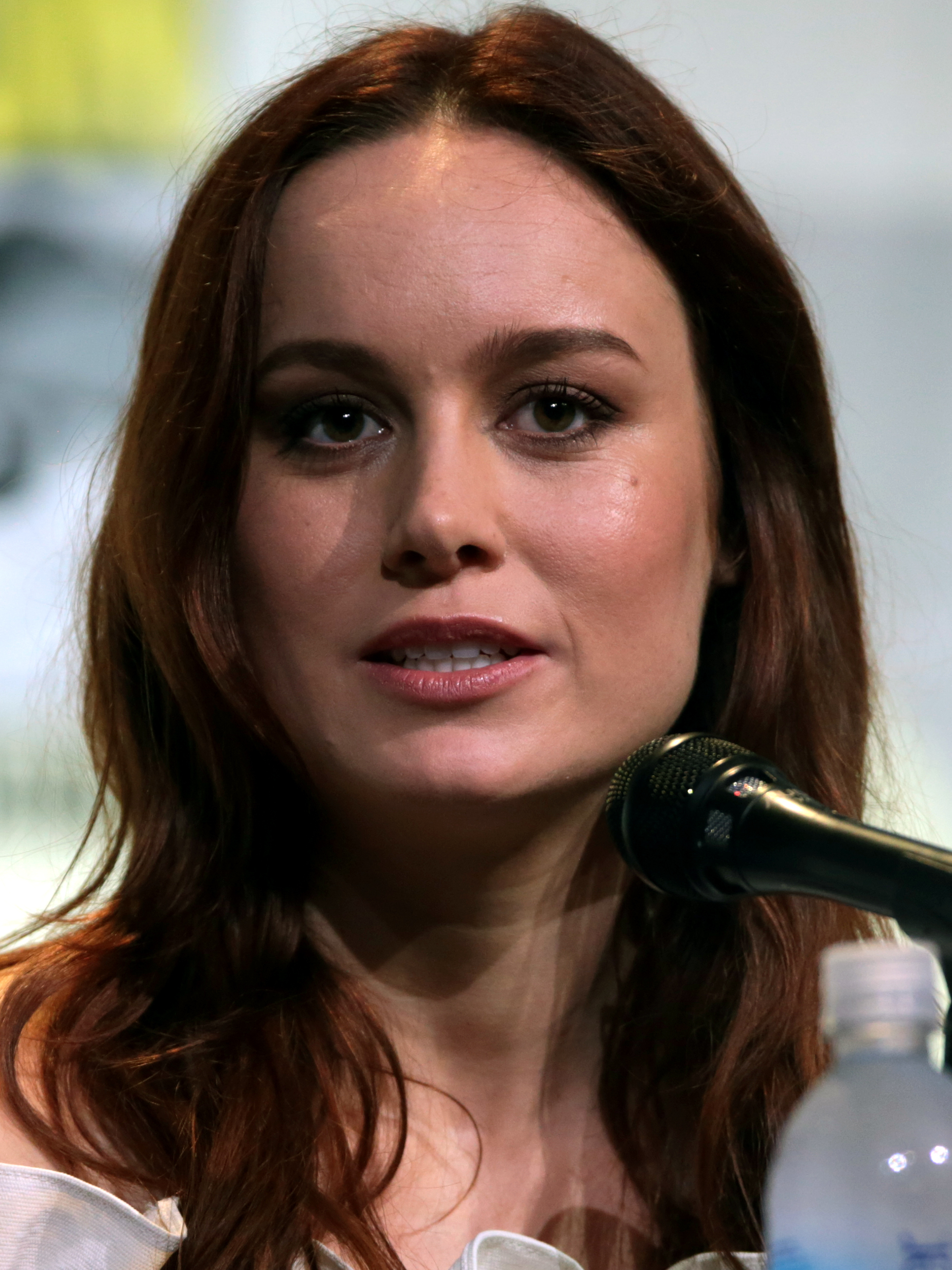
Brie Larson won for Room (2015).

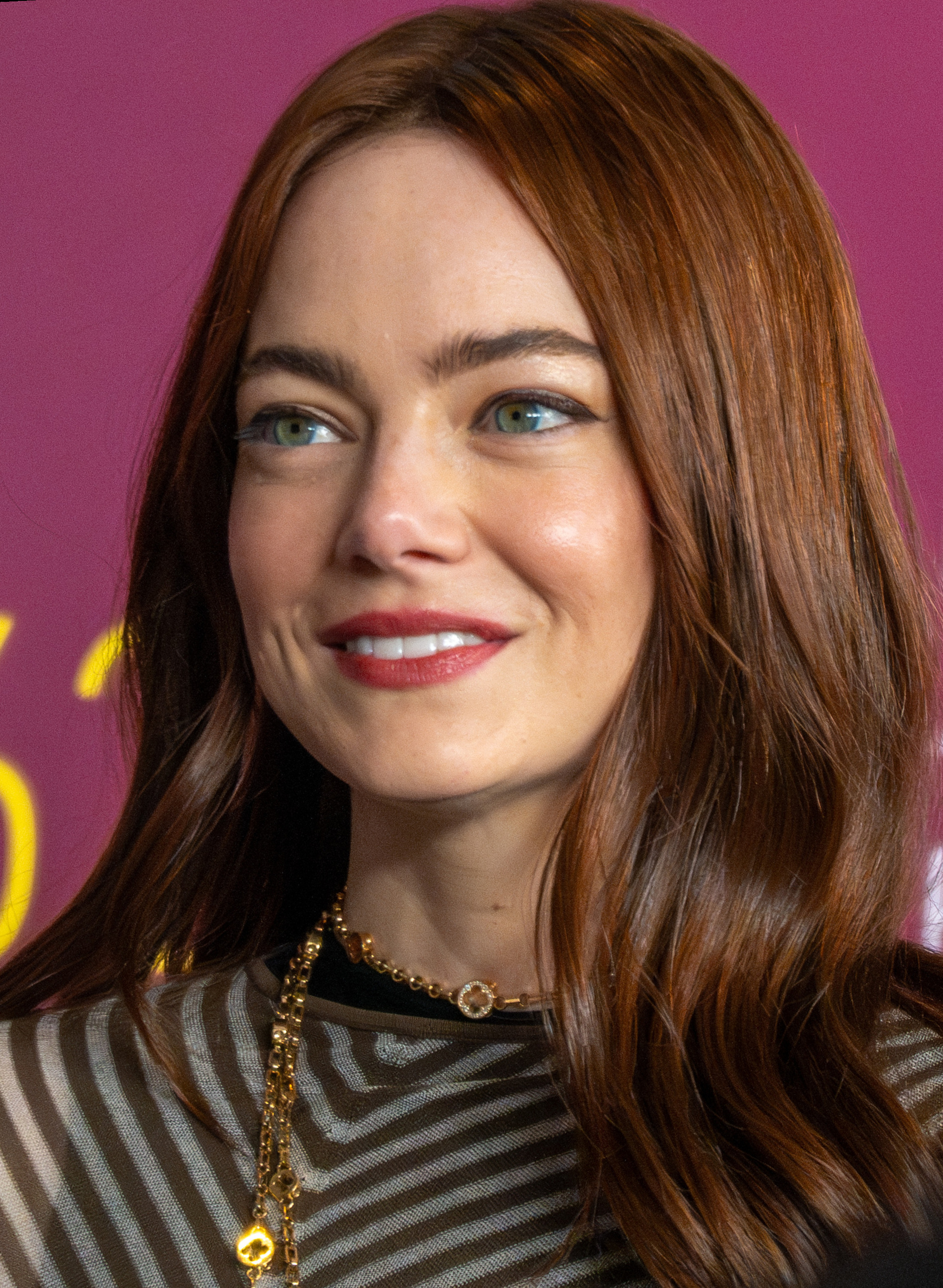
Emma Stone won twice, for La La Land (2016) and Poor Things (2023).

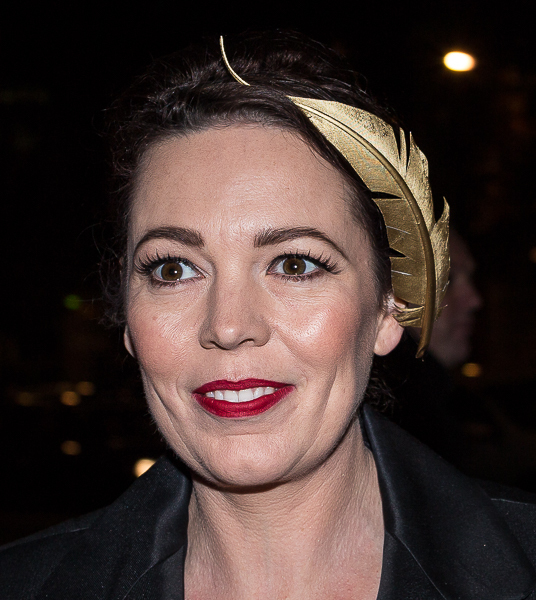
Olivia Colman won for The Favourite (2018).

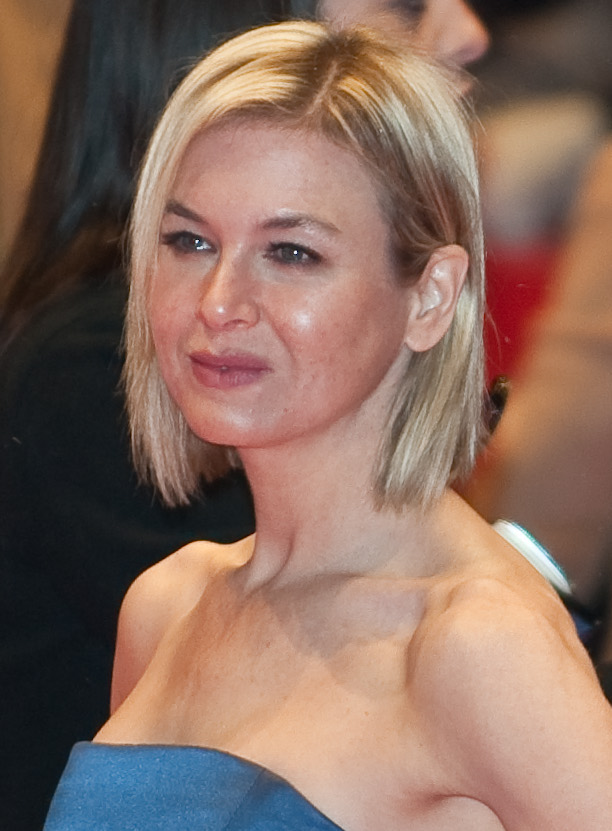
Renée Zellweger won for Judy (2019).

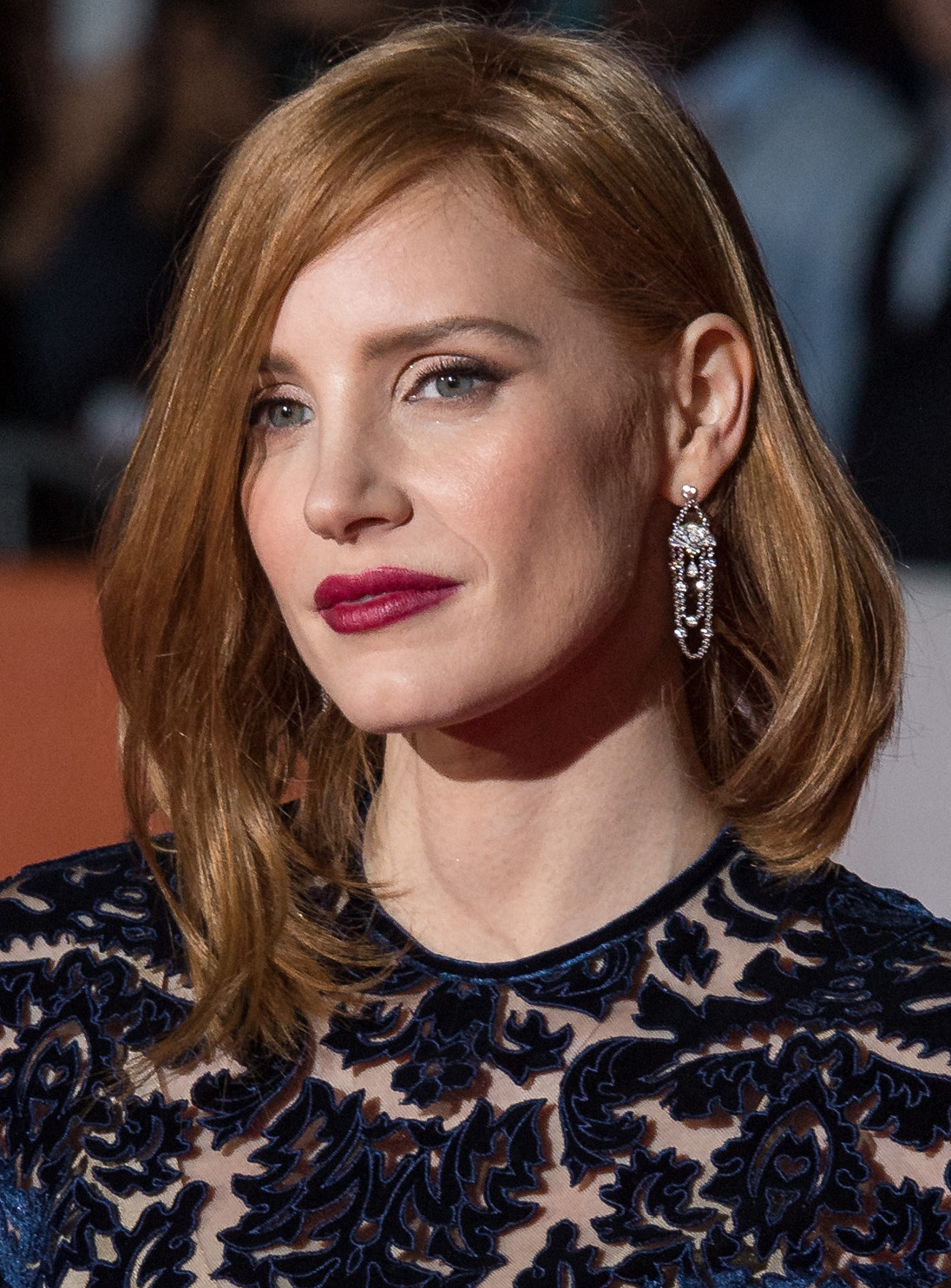
Jessica Chastain won for The Eyes of Tammy Faye (2021).

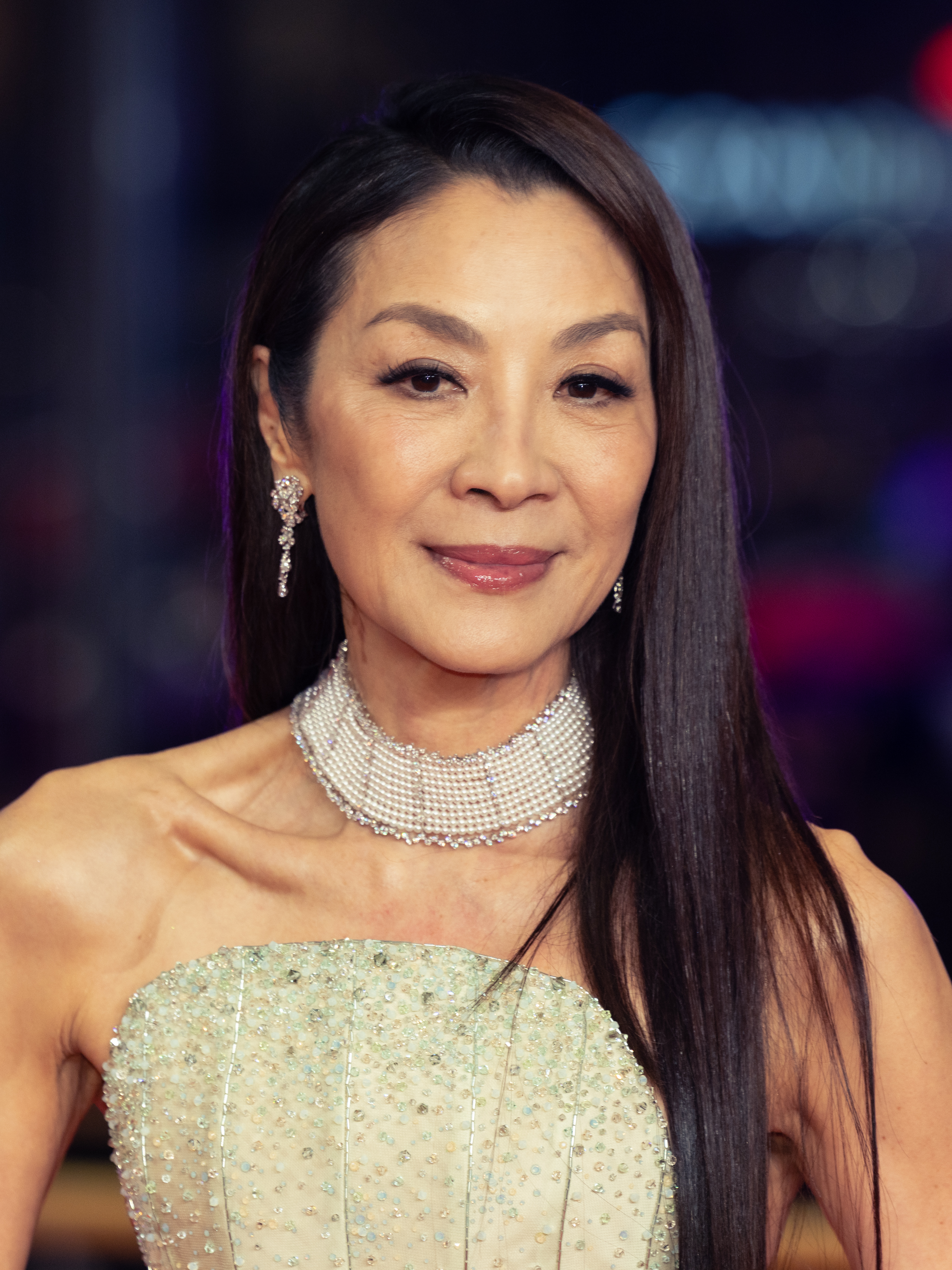
Michelle Yeoh won for Everything Everywhere All at Once (2022); first Southeast Asian winner in this category.

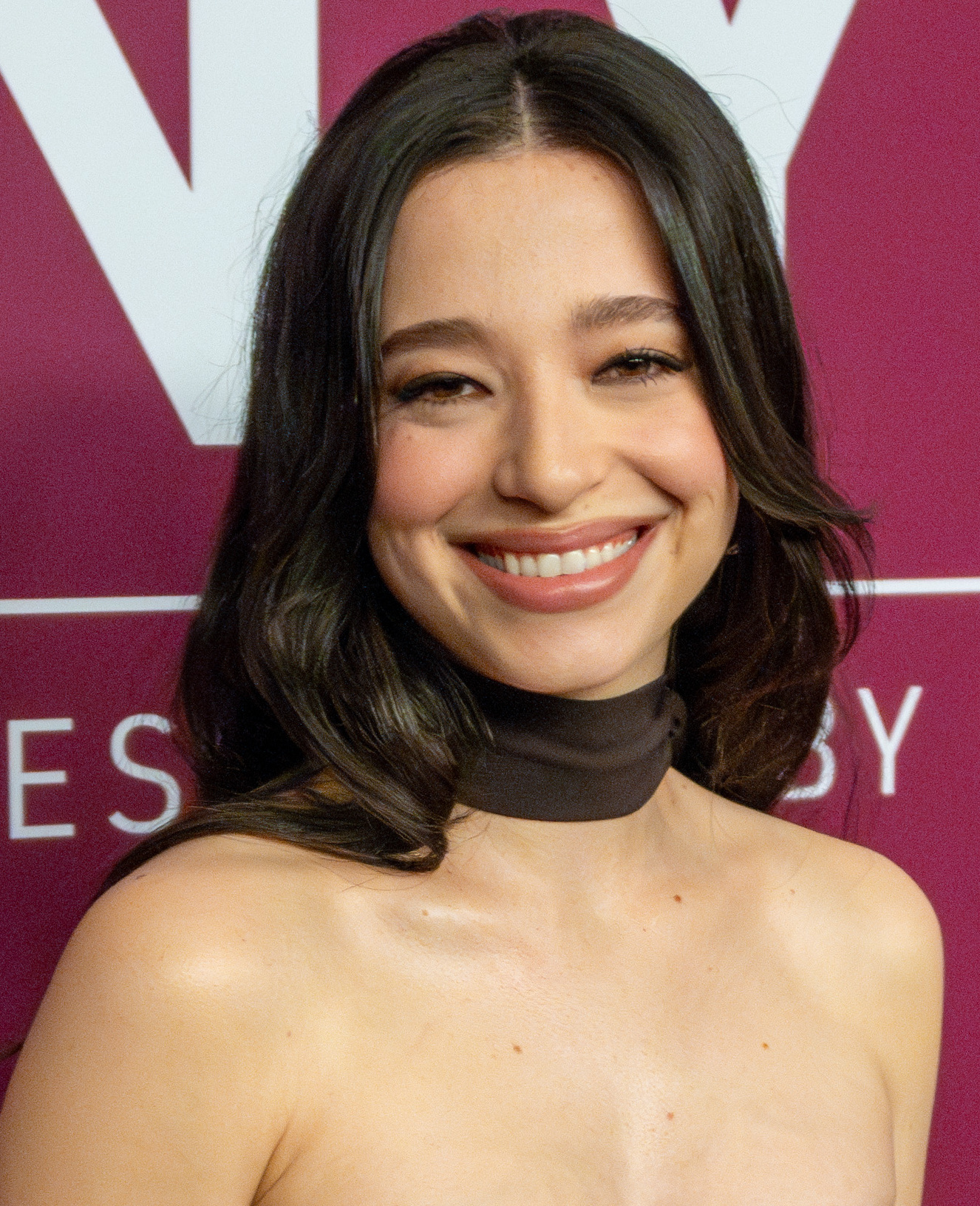
Mikey Madison won for Anora (2024).

== Winners and nominees ==
In the following table, the years are listed as per Academy convention, and generally correspond to the year of film release in Los Angeles County; the ceremonies are always held the following year. For the first five ceremonies, the eligibility period spanned twelve months, from August 1 to July 31. For the 6th ceremony held in 1934, the eligibility period lasted from August 1, 1932, to December 31, 1933. Since the 7th ceremony held in 1935, the period of eligibility became the full previous calendar year from January 1 to December 31.

Table key
‡	Indicates the winner
†	Indicates a posthumous nominee

=== 1920s ===
Year	Actress	Role(s)	Film	Ref.
1927/28 (1st)	Janet Gaynor ‡	Diane	7th Heaven	
1927/28 (1st)	Janet Gaynor ‡	Angela	Street Angel	
1927/28 (1st)	Janet Gaynor ‡	The Wife	Sunrise: A Song of Two Humans	
1927/28 (1st)	Louise Dresser	Mrs. Pleznik	A Ship Comes In	
1927/28 (1st)	Gloria Swanson	Sadie Thompson	Sadie Thompson	
1928/29 (2nd) (Note: The 2nd Academy Awards is unique in being the only occasion where there were no official nominees. Subsequent research by AMPAS has resulted in a list of unofficial or de facto nominees, based on records of which films were evaluated by the judges.)	Mary Pickford ‡	Norma Besant	Coquette	
1928/29 (2nd)	Ruth Chatterton	Jacqueline Floriot	Madame X	
1928/29 (2nd)	Betty Compson	Carrie	The Barker	
1928/29 (2nd)	Jeanne Eagels †	Leslie Crosbie	The Letter	
1928/29 (2nd)	Corinne Griffith	Emma Hamilton	The Divine Lady	
1928/29 (2nd)	Bessie Love	Harriet "Hank" Mahoney	The Broadway Melody	

=== 1930s ===
Year	Actress	Role(s)	Film	Ref.
1929/30 (3rd)	Norma Shearer ‡^{[A]}	Jerry Bernard Martin	The Divorcee	
1929/30 (3rd)	Nancy Carroll	Hallie Hobart	The Devil's Holiday	
1929/30 (3rd)	Ruth Chatterton	Sarah Storm	Sarah and Son	
1929/30 (3rd)	Greta Garbo^{[A]}	Anna Christie	Anna Christie	
1929/30 (3rd)	Greta Garbo^{[A]}	Madame Rita Cavallini	Romance	
1929/30 (3rd)	Norma Shearer	Lucia Marlett	Their Own Desire	
1929/30 (3rd)	Gloria Swanson	Marion Donnell	The Trespasser	
1930/31 (4th)	Marie Dressler ‡	Min Divot	Min and Bill	
1930/31 (4th)	Marlene Dietrich	Mademoiselle Amy Jolly	Morocco	
1930/31 (4th)	Irene Dunne	Sabra Cravat	Cimarron	
1930/31 (4th)	Ann Harding	Linda Seton	Holiday	
1930/31 (4th)	Norma Shearer	Jan Ashe	A Free Soul	
1931/32 (5th)	Helen Hayes ‡	Madelon Claudet	The Sin of Madelon Claudet	
1931/32 (5th)	Marie Dressler	Emma Thatcher Smith	Emma	
1931/32 (5th)	Lynn Fontanne	The Actress	The Guardsman	
1932/33 (6th)	Katharine Hepburn ‡	Eva Lovelace	Morning Glory	
1932/33 (6th)	May Robson	Apple Annie	Lady for a Day	
1932/33 (6th)	Diana Wynyard	Jane Marryot	Cavalcade	
1934 (7th)	Claudette Colbert ‡	Ellie Andrews	It Happened One Night	
1934 (7th)	Bette Davis (Write-in)^{[B]}	Mildred Rogers	Of Human Bondage	
1934 (7th)	Grace Moore	Mary Barrett	One Night of Love	
1934 (7th)	Norma Shearer	Elizabeth Barrett	The Barretts of Wimpole Street	
1935 (8th)	Bette Davis ‡	Joyce Heath	Dangerous	
1935 (8th)	Elisabeth Bergner	Gemma Jones	Escape Me Never	
1935 (8th)	Claudette Colbert	Jane Everest	Private Worlds	
1935 (8th)	Katharine Hepburn	Alice Adams	Alice Adams	
1935 (8th)	Miriam Hopkins	Becky Sharp	Becky Sharp	
1935 (8th)	Merle Oberon	Kitty Vane	The Dark Angel	
1936 (9th)	Luise Rainer ‡	Anna Held	The Great Ziegfeld	
1936 (9th)	Irene Dunne	Theodora Lynn / Caroline Adams	Theodora Goes Wild	
1936 (9th)	Gladys George	Carrie Snyder	Valiant Is the Word for Carrie	
1936 (9th)	Carole Lombard	Irene Bullock	My Man Godfrey	
1936 (9th)	Norma Shearer	Juliet Capulet	Romeo and Juliet	
1937 (10th)	Luise Rainer ‡	O-Lan	The Good Earth	
1937 (10th)	Irene Dunne	Lucy Warriner	The Awful Truth	
1937 (10th)	Greta Garbo	Marguerite Gautier	Camille	
1937 (10th)	Janet Gaynor	Esther Victoria Blodgett / Vicki Lester	A Star Is Born	
1937 (10th)	Barbara Stanwyck	Stella Martin Dallas	Stella Dallas	
1938 (11th)	Bette Davis ‡	Julie Marsden	Jezebel	
1938 (11th)	Fay Bainter	Hannah Parmalee	White Banners	
1938 (11th)	Wendy Hiller	Eliza Doolittle	Pygmalion	
1938 (11th)	Norma Shearer	Marie Antoinette	Marie Antoinette	
1938 (11th)	Margaret Sullavan	Patricia "Pat" Hollmann	Three Comrades	
1939 (12th)	Vivien Leigh ‡	Scarlett O'Hara	Gone with the Wind	
1939 (12th)	Bette Davis	Judith Traherne	Dark Victory	
1939 (12th)	Irene Dunne	Terry McKay	Love Affair	
1939 (12th)	Greta Garbo	Nina Yakushova "Ninotchka" Ivanoff	Ninotchka	
1939 (12th)	Greer Garson	Katherine Bridges	Goodbye, Mr. Chips	

=== 1940s ===
Year	Actress	Role(s)	Film	Ref.
1940 (13th)	Ginger Rogers ‡	Kitty Foyle	Kitty Foyle	
1940 (13th)	Bette Davis	Leslie Crosbie	The Letter	
1940 (13th)	Joan Fontaine	The Second Mrs. de Winter	Rebecca	
1940 (13th)	Katharine Hepburn	Tracy Lord	The Philadelphia Story	
1940 (13th)	Martha Scott	Emily Webb	Our Town	
1941 (14th)	Joan Fontaine ‡	Lina McLaidlaw Aysgarth	Suspicion	
1941 (14th)	Bette Davis	Regina Giddens	The Little Foxes	
1941 (14th)	Olivia de Havilland	Emmy Brown	Hold Back the Dawn	
1941 (14th)	Greer Garson	Edna Gladney	Blossoms in the Dust	
1941 (14th)	Barbara Stanwyck	Katherine "Sugarpuss" O'Shea	Ball of Fire	
1942 (15th)	Greer Garson ‡	Kay Miniver	Mrs. Miniver	
1942 (15th)	Bette Davis	Charlotte Vale	Now, Voyager	
1942 (15th)	Katharine Hepburn	Tess Harding	Woman of the Year	
1942 (15th)	Rosalind Russell	Ruth Sherwood	My Sister Eileen	
1942 (15th)	Teresa Wright	Eleanor Twitchell Gehrig	The Pride of the Yankees	
1943 (16th)	Jennifer Jones ‡	Bernadette Soubirous	The Song of Bernadette	
1943 (16th)	Jean Arthur	Constance "Connie" Milligan	The More the Merrier	
1943 (16th)	Ingrid Bergman	María	For Whom the Bell Tolls	
1943 (16th)	Joan Fontaine	Tessa Sanger	The Constant Nymph	
1943 (16th)	Greer Garson	Marie Curie	Madame Curie	
1944 (17th)	Ingrid Bergman ‡	Paula Alquist Anton	Gaslight	
1944 (17th)	Claudette Colbert	Anne Hilton	Since You Went Away	
1944 (17th)	Bette Davis	Fanny Trellis	Mr. Skeffington	
1944 (17th)	Greer Garson	Susie "Sparrow" Parkington	Mrs. Parkington	
1944 (17th)	Barbara Stanwyck	Phyllis Dietrichson	Double Indemnity	
1945 (18th)	Joan Crawford ‡	Mildred Pierce Beragon	Mildred Pierce	
1945 (18th)	Ingrid Bergman	Mary Benedict	The Bells of St. Mary's	
1945 (18th)	Greer Garson	Mary Rafferty	The Valley of Decision	
1945 (18th)	Jennifer Jones	Singleton / Victoria Morland	Love Letters	
1945 (18th)	Gene Tierney	Ellen Berent Harland	Leave Her to Heaven	
1946 (19th)	Olivia de Havilland ‡	Josephine "Jody" Norris	To Each His Own	
1946 (19th)	Celia Johnson	Laura Jesson	Brief Encounter	
1946 (19th)	Jennifer Jones	Pearl Chavez	Duel in the Sun	
1946 (19th)	Rosalind Russell	Elizabeth Kenny	Sister Kenny	
1946 (19th)	Jane Wyman	Orry Baxter	The Yearling	
1947 (20th)	Loretta Young ‡	Katrin "Katie" Holstrom	The Farmer's Daughter	
1947 (20th)	Joan Crawford	Louise Howell	Possessed	
1947 (20th)	Susan Hayward	Angelica Evans Conway	Smash-Up, the Story of a Woman	
1947 (20th)	Dorothy McGuire	Kathy Lacy	Gentleman's Agreement	
1947 (20th)	Rosalind Russell	Lavinia Mannon	Mourning Becomes Electra	
1948 (21st)	Jane Wyman ‡	Belinda McDonald	Johnny Belinda	
1948 (21st)	Ingrid Bergman	Joan of Arc	Joan of Arc	
1948 (21st)	Olivia de Havilland	Virginia Stuart Cunningham	The Snake Pit	
1948 (21st)	Irene Dunne	Martha Halvorsen Hanson	I Remember Mama	
1948 (21st)	Barbara Stanwyck	Leona Cotterell Stevenson	Sorry, Wrong Number	
1949 (22nd)	Olivia de Havilland ‡	Catherine Sloper	The Heiress	
1949 (22nd)	Jeanne Crain	Patricia "Pinky" Johnson	Pinky	
1949 (22nd)	Susan Hayward	Eloise Winters	My Foolish Heart	
1949 (22nd)	Deborah Kerr	Evelyn Boult	Edward, My Son	
1949 (22nd)	Loretta Young	Sister Margaret	Come to the Stable	

=== 1950s ===
Year	Actress	Role(s)	Film	Ref.
1950 (23rd)	Judy Holliday ‡	Emma "Billie" Dawn	Born Yesterday	
1950 (23rd)	Anne Baxter	Gertrude Slojinski / Eve Harrington	All About Eve	
1950 (23rd)	Bette Davis	Margo Channing	All About Eve	
1950 (23rd)	Eleanor Parker	Marie Allen	Caged	
1950 (23rd)	Gloria Swanson	Norma Desmond	Sunset Boulevard	
1951 (24th)	Vivien Leigh ‡	Blanche DuBois	A Streetcar Named Desire	
1951 (24th)	Katharine Hepburn	Rose Sayer	The African Queen	
1951 (24th)	Eleanor Parker	Mary McLeod	Detective Story	
1951 (24th)	Shelley Winters	Alice Tripp	A Place in the Sun	
1951 (24th)	Jane Wyman	Louise Mason	The Blue Veil	
1952 (25th)	Shirley Booth ‡	Lola Delaney	Come Back, Little Sheba	
1952 (25th)	Joan Crawford	Myra Hudson Blaine	Sudden Fear	
1952 (25th)	Bette Davis	Margaret Elliot	The Star	
1952 (25th)	Julie Harris	Frances "Frankie" Addams	The Member of the Wedding	
1952 (25th)	Susan Hayward	Jane Froman	With a Song in My Heart	
1953 (26th)	Audrey Hepburn ‡	Princess Ann	Roman Holiday	
1953 (26th)	Leslie Caron	Lili Daurier	Lili	
1953 (26th)	Ava Gardner	Eloise "Honey Bear" Kelly	Mogambo	
1953 (26th)	Deborah Kerr	Karen Holmes	From Here to Eternity	
1953 (26th)	Maggie McNamara	Patty O'Neill	The Moon Is Blue	
1954 (27th)	Grace Kelly ‡	Georgie Elgin	The Country Girl	
1954 (27th)	Dorothy Dandridge	Carmen Jones	Carmen Jones	
1954 (27th)	Judy Garland	Esther Victoria Blodgett / Vicki Lester	A Star Is Born	
1954 (27th)	Audrey Hepburn	Sabrina Fairchild	Sabrina	
1954 (27th)	Jane Wyman	Helen Phillips	Magnificent Obsession	
1955 (28th)	Anna Magnani ‡	Serafina Delle Rose	The Rose Tattoo	
1955 (28th)	Susan Hayward	Lillian Roth	I'll Cry Tomorrow	
1955 (28th)	Katharine Hepburn	Jane Hudson	Summertime	
1955 (28th)	Jennifer Jones	Han Suyin	Love is a Many-Splendored Thing	
1955 (28th)	Eleanor Parker	Marjorie Lawrence	Interrupted Melody	
1956 (29th)	Ingrid Bergman ‡	Anna Koreff / Anastasia	Anastasia	
1956 (29th)	Carroll Baker	Baby Doll Meighan	Baby Doll	
1956 (29th)	Katharine Hepburn	Lizzie Curry	The Rainmaker	
1956 (29th)	Nancy Kelly	Christine Penmark	The Bad Seed	
1956 (29th)	Deborah Kerr	Anna Leonowens	The King and I	
1957 (30th)	Joanne Woodward ‡	Eve White / Eve Black / Jane	The Three Faces of Eve	
1957 (30th)	Deborah Kerr	Angela	Heaven Knows, Mr. Allison	
1957 (30th)	Anna Magnani	Gioia	Wild Is the Wind	
1957 (30th)	Elizabeth Taylor	Susanna Drake	Raintree County	
1957 (30th)	Lana Turner	Constance MacKenzie	Peyton Place	
1958 (31st)	Susan Hayward ‡	Barbara Graham	I Want to Live!	
1958 (31st)	Deborah Kerr	Sibyl Railton-Bell	Separate Tables	
1958 (31st)	Shirley MacLaine	Ginnie Moorehead	Some Came Running	
1958 (31st)	Rosalind Russell	Mame Dennis	Auntie Mame	
1958 (31st)	Elizabeth Taylor	Margaret "Maggie the Cat" Pollitt	Cat on a Hot Tin Roof	
1959 (32nd)	Simone Signoret ‡	Alice Aisgill	Room at the Top	
1959 (32nd)	Doris Day	Jan Morrow	Pillow Talk	
1959 (32nd)	Audrey Hepburn	Gabrielle van der Mal	The Nun's Story	
1959 (32nd)	Katharine Hepburn	Violet Venable	Suddenly, Last Summer	
1959 (32nd)	Elizabeth Taylor	Catherine Holly	Suddenly, Last Summer	

=== 1960s ===
Year	Actress	Role(s)	Film	Ref.
1960 (33rd)	Elizabeth Taylor ‡	Gloria Wandrous	BUtterfield 8	
1960 (33rd)	Greer Garson	Eleanor Roosevelt	Sunrise at Campobello	
1960 (33rd)	Deborah Kerr	Ida Carmody	The Sundowners	
1960 (33rd)	Shirley MacLaine	Fran Kubelik	The Apartment	
1960 (33rd)	Melina Mercouri	Ilya	Never on Sunday	
1961 (34th)	Sophia Loren ‡	Cesira	Two Women	
1961 (34th)	Audrey Hepburn	Holly Golightly / Lula Mae Barnes	Breakfast at Tiffany's	
1961 (34th)	Piper Laurie	Sarah Packard	The Hustler	
1961 (34th)	Geraldine Page	Alma Winemiller	Summer and Smoke	
1961 (34th)	Natalie Wood	Wilma Dean "Deanie" Loomis	Splendor in the Grass	
1962 (35th)	Anne Bancroft ‡	Annie Sullivan	The Miracle Worker	
1962 (35th)	Bette Davis	Baby Jane Hudson	What Ever Happened to Baby Jane?	
1962 (35th)	Katharine Hepburn	Mary Cavan Tyrone	Long Day's Journey into Night	
1962 (35th)	Geraldine Page	Alexandra Del Lago	Sweet Bird of Youth	
1962 (35th)	Lee Remick	Kirsten Arnesen Clay	Days of Wine and Roses	
1963 (36th)	Patricia Neal ‡	Alma Brown	Hud	
1963 (36th)	Leslie Caron	Jane Fossett	The L-Shaped Room	
1963 (36th)	Shirley MacLaine	Irma La Douce	Irma la Douce	
1963 (36th)	Rachel Roberts	Margaret Hammond	This Sporting Life	
1963 (36th)	Natalie Wood	Angie Rossini	Love with the Proper Stranger	
1964 (37th)	Julie Andrews ‡	Mary Poppins	Mary Poppins	
1964 (37th)	Anne Bancroft	Jo Armitage	The Pumpkin Eater	
1964 (37th)	Sophia Loren	Filumena Marturano	Marriage Italian Style	
1964 (37th)	Debbie Reynolds	Molly Brown	The Unsinkable Molly Brown	
1964 (37th)	Kim Stanley	Myra Savage	Séance on a Wet Afternoon	
1965 (38th)	Julie Christie ‡	Diana Scott	Darling	
1965 (38th)	Julie Andrews	Maria von Trapp	The Sound of Music	
1965 (38th)	Samantha Eggar	Miranda Grey	The Collector	
1965 (38th)	Elizabeth Hartman	Selina D'Arcy	A Patch of Blue	
1965 (38th)	Simone Signoret	La Condesa	Ship of Fools	
1966 (39th)	Elizabeth Taylor ‡	Martha	Who's Afraid of Virginia Woolf?	
1966 (39th)	Anouk Aimée	Anne Gauthier	A Man and a Woman	
1966 (39th)	Ida Kamińska	Rozalie Lautmann	The Shop on Main Street	
1966 (39th)	Lynn Redgrave	Georgina "Georgy" Parkin	Georgy Girl	
1966 (39th)	Vanessa Redgrave	Leonie Henderson Delt	Morgan!	
1967 (40th)	Katharine Hepburn ‡	Christina Drayton	Guess Who's Coming to Dinner	
1967 (40th)	Anne Bancroft	Mrs. Robinson	The Graduate	
1967 (40th)	Faye Dunaway	Bonnie Parker	Bonnie and Clyde	
1967 (40th)	Edith Evans	Margaret "Maggie" Seton Ross	The Whisperers	
1967 (40th)	Audrey Hepburn	Susy Hendrix	Wait Until Dark	
1968 (41st)	Katharine Hepburn ‡ (TIE)^{[C]}	Eleanor of Aquitaine	The Lion in Winter	
1968 (41st)	Barbra Streisand ‡ (TIE)^{[C]}	Fanny Brice	Funny Girl	
1968 (41st)	Patricia Neal	Nettie Cleary	The Subject Was Roses	
1968 (41st)	Vanessa Redgrave	Isadora Duncan	Isadora	
1968 (41st)	Joanne Woodward	Rachel Cameron	Rachel, Rachel	
1969 (42nd)	Maggie Smith ‡	Jean Brodie	The Prime of Miss Jean Brodie	
1969 (42nd)	Geneviève Bujold	Anne Boleyn	Anne of the Thousand Days	
1969 (42nd)	Jane Fonda	Gloria Beatty	They Shoot Horses, Don't They?	
1969 (42nd)	Liza Minnelli	Mary Ann "Pookie" Adams	The Sterile Cuckoo	
1969 (42nd)	Jean Simmons	Mary Wilson	The Happy Ending	

=== 1970s ===
Year	Actress	Role(s)	Film	Ref.
1970 (43rd)	Glenda Jackson ‡	Gudrun Brangwen	Women in Love	
1970 (43rd)	Jane Alexander	Eleanor Backman	The Great White Hope	
1970 (43rd)	Ali MacGraw	Jennifer Cavalleri-Barrett	Love Story	
1970 (43rd)	Sarah Miles	Rosy Ryan	Ryan's Daughter	
1970 (43rd)	Carrie Snodgress	Bettina "Tina" Balser	Diary of a Mad Housewife	
1971 (44th)	Jane Fonda ‡	Bree Daniels	Klute	
1971 (44th)	Julie Christie	Constance Miller	McCabe & Mrs. Miller	
1971 (44th)	Glenda Jackson	Alex Greville	Sunday Bloody Sunday	
1971 (44th)	Vanessa Redgrave	Mary, Queen of Scots	Mary, Queen of Scots	
1971 (44th)	Janet Suzman	Empress Alexandra of Russia	Nicholas and Alexandra	
1972 (45th)	Liza Minnelli ‡	Sally Bowles	Cabaret	
1972 (45th)	Diana Ross	Billie Holiday	Lady Sings the Blues	
1972 (45th)	Maggie Smith	Augusta Bertram	Travels with My Aunt	
1972 (45th)	Cicely Tyson	Rebecca Morgan	Sounder	
1972 (45th)	Liv Ullmann	Kristina Nilsson	The Emigrants	
1973 (46th)	Glenda Jackson ‡	Vickie Allessio	A Touch of Class	
1973 (46th)	Ellen Burstyn	Chris MacNeil	The Exorcist	
1973 (46th)	Marsha Mason	Maggie Paul	Cinderella Liberty	
1973 (46th)	Barbra Streisand	Katie Morosky	The Way We Were	
1973 (46th)	Joanne Woodward	Rita Walden	Summer Wishes, Winter Dreams	
1974 (47th)	Ellen Burstyn ‡	Alice Hyatt	Alice Doesn't Live Here Anymore	
1974 (47th)	Diahann Carroll	Claudine Price	Claudine	
1974 (47th)	Faye Dunaway	Evelyn Cross Mulwray	Chinatown	
1974 (47th)	Valerie Perrine	Harriett Jolliff / Honey Bruce	Lenny	
1974 (47th)	Gena Rowlands	Mabel Longhetti	A Woman Under the Influence	
1975 (48th)	Louise Fletcher ‡	Nurse Mildred Ratched	One Flew Over the Cuckoo's Nest	
1975 (48th)	Isabelle Adjani	Adèle Hugo / Adèle Lewly	The Story of Adele H.	
1975 (48th)	Ann-Margret	Nora Walker	Tommy	
1975 (48th)	Glenda Jackson	Hedda Gabler	Hedda	
1975 (48th)	Carol Kane	Gitl	Hester Street	
1976 (49th)	Faye Dunaway ‡	Diana Christensen	Network	
1976 (49th)	Marie-Christine Barrault	Marthe	Cousin Cousine	
1976 (49th)	Talia Shire	Adrian Pennino	Rocky	
1976 (49th)	Sissy Spacek	Carrie White	Carrie	
1976 (49th)	Liv Ullmann	Jenny Isaksson	Face to Face	
1977 (50th)	Diane Keaton ‡	Annie Hall	Annie Hall	
1977 (50th)	Anne Bancroft	Emma Jacklin	The Turning Point	
1977 (50th)	Jane Fonda	Lillian Hellman	Julia	
1977 (50th)	Shirley MacLaine	Deedee Rodgers	The Turning Point	
1977 (50th)	Marsha Mason	Paula McFadden	The Goodbye Girl	
1978 (51st)	Jane Fonda ‡	Sally Hyde	Coming Home	
1978 (51st)	Ingrid Bergman	Charlotte Andergast	Autumn Sonata	
1978 (51st)	Ellen Burstyn	Doris	Same Time, Next Year	
1978 (51st)	Jill Clayburgh	Erica Benton	An Unmarried Woman	
1978 (51st)	Geraldine Page	Eve	Interiors	
1979 (52nd)	Sally Field ‡	Norma Rae Webster	Norma Rae	
1979 (52nd)	Jill Clayburgh	Marilyn Holmberg	Starting Over	
1979 (52nd)	Jane Fonda	Kimberly Wells	The China Syndrome	
1979 (52nd)	Marsha Mason	Jennie MacLaine	Chapter Two	
1979 (52nd)	Bette Midler	Mary Rose "The Rose" Foster	The Rose	

=== 1980s ===
Year	Actress	Role(s)	Film	Ref.
1980 (53rd)	Sissy Spacek ‡	Loretta Lynn	Coal Miner's Daughter	
1980 (53rd)	Ellen Burstyn	Edna Mae Harper-McCauley	Resurrection	
1980 (53rd)	Goldie Hawn	Judy Benjamin	Private Benjamin	
1980 (53rd)	Mary Tyler Moore	Beth Jarrett	Ordinary People	
1980 (53rd)	Gena Rowlands	Gloria Swenson	Gloria	
1981 (54th)	Katharine Hepburn ‡	Ethel Thayer	On Golden Pond	
1981 (54th)	Diane Keaton	Louise Bryant	Reds	
1981 (54th)	Marsha Mason	Georgia Hines	Only When I Laugh	
1981 (54th)	Susan Sarandon	Sally Matthews	Atlantic City	
1981 (54th)	Meryl Streep	Sara Woodruff and Anna	The French Lieutenant's Woman	
1982 (55th)	Meryl Streep ‡	Sophie Zawistowski	Sophie's Choice	
1982 (55th)	Julie Andrews	Victor Grazinski / Victoria Grant	Victor/Victoria	
1982 (55th)	Jessica Lange	Frances Farmer	Frances	
1982 (55th)	Sissy Spacek	Beth Horman	Missing	
1982 (55th)	Debra Winger	Paula Pokrifki	An Officer and a Gentleman	
1983 (56th)	Shirley MacLaine ‡	Aurora Greenway	Terms of Endearment	
1983 (56th)	Jane Alexander	Carol Wetherly	Testament	
1983 (56th)	Meryl Streep	Karen Silkwood	Silkwood	
1983 (56th)	Julie Walters	Susan White / Rita	Educating Rita	
1983 (56th)	Debra Winger	Emma Greenway Horton	Terms of Endearment	
1984 (57th)	Sally Field ‡	Edna Spalding	Places in the Heart	
1984 (57th)	Judy Davis	Adela Quested	A Passage to India	
1984 (57th)	Jessica Lange	Jewell Ivy	Country	
1984 (57th)	Vanessa Redgrave	Olive Chancellor	The Bostonians	
1984 (57th)	Sissy Spacek	Mae Garvey	The River	
1985 (58th)	Geraldine Page ‡	Carrie Watts	The Trip to Bountiful	
1985 (58th)	Anne Bancroft	Miriam Ruth / Anna Maria Burchetti	Agnes of God	
1985 (58th)	Whoopi Goldberg	Celie Harris-Johnson	The Color Purple	
1985 (58th)	Jessica Lange	Patsy Cline	Sweet Dreams	
1985 (58th)	Meryl Streep	Karen Blixen	Out of Africa	
1986 (59th)	Marlee Matlin ‡	Sarah Norman	Children of a Lesser God	
1986 (59th)	Jane Fonda	Alex Sternbergen / Viveca Van Loren	The Morning After	
1986 (59th)	Sissy Spacek	Babe Botrelle / Rebecca MaGrath	Crimes of the Heart	
1986 (59th)	Kathleen Turner	Peggy Sue Kelcher-Bodell	Peggy Sue Got Married	
1986 (59th)	Sigourney Weaver	Ellen Ripley	Aliens	
1987 (60th)	Cher ‡	Loretta Castorini	Moonstruck	
1987 (60th)	Glenn Close	Alex Forrest	Fatal Attraction	
1987 (60th)	Holly Hunter	Jane Craig	Broadcast News	
1987 (60th)	Sally Kirkland	Anna	Anna	
1987 (60th)	Meryl Streep	Helen Archer	Ironweed	
1988 (61st)	Jodie Foster ‡	Sarah Tobias	The Accused	
1988 (61st)	Glenn Close	Marquise Isabelle de Merteuil	Dangerous Liaisons	
1988 (61st)	Melanie Griffith	Tess McGill	Working Girl	
1988 (61st)	Meryl Streep	Lindy Chamberlain	A Cry in the Dark	
1988 (61st)	Sigourney Weaver	Dian Fossey	Gorillas in the Mist	
1989 (62nd)	Jessica Tandy ‡	Daisy Werthan	Driving Miss Daisy	
1989 (62nd)	Isabelle Adjani	Camille Claudel	Camille Claudel	
1989 (62nd)	Pauline Collins	Shirley Valentine-Bradshaw	Shirley Valentine	
1989 (62nd)	Jessica Lange	Ann Talbot	Music Box	
1989 (62nd)	Michelle Pfeiffer	Susie Diamond	The Fabulous Baker Boys	

=== 1990s ===
Year	Actress	Role(s)	Film	Ref.
1990 (63rd)	Kathy Bates ‡	Annie Wilkes	Misery	
1990 (63rd)	Anjelica Huston	Lilly Dillon	The Grifters	
1990 (63rd)	Julia Roberts	Vivian Ward	Pretty Woman	
1990 (63rd)	Meryl Streep	Suzanne Vale	Postcards from the Edge	
1990 (63rd)	Joanne Woodward	India Bridge	Mr. & Mrs. Bridge	
1991 (64th)	Jodie Foster ‡	Clarice Starling	The Silence of the Lambs	
1991 (64th)	Geena Davis	Thelma Yvonne Dickinson	Thelma & Louise	
1991 (64th)	Laura Dern	Rose	Rambling Rose	
1991 (64th)	Bette Midler	Dixie Leonard	For the Boys	
1991 (64th)	Susan Sarandon	Louise Elizabeth Sawyer	Thelma & Louise	
1992 (65th)	Emma Thompson ‡	Margaret Schlegel	Howards End	
1992 (65th)	Catherine Deneuve	Éliane Devries	Indochine	
1992 (65th)	Mary McDonnell	May-Alice Culhane	Passion Fish	
1992 (65th)	Michelle Pfeiffer	Louise Irene "Lurene" Hallett	Love Field	
1992 (65th)	Susan Sarandon	Michaela Murphy Odone	Lorenzo's Oil	
1993 (66th)	Holly Hunter ‡	Ada McGrath	The Piano	
1993 (66th)	Angela Bassett	Anna Mae Bullock / Tina Turner	What's Love Got to Do with It	
1993 (66th)	Stockard Channing	Louisa "Ouisa" Kittredge	Six Degrees of Separation	
1993 (66th)	Emma Thompson	Sarah "Sally" Kenton	The Remains of the Day	
1993 (66th)	Debra Winger	Joy Davidman	Shadowlands	
1994 (67th)	Jessica Lange ‡	Carly Marshall	Blue Sky	
1994 (67th)	Jodie Foster	Nell Kellty	Nell	
1994 (67th)	Miranda Richardson	Vivienne Haigh-Wood	Tom & Viv	
1994 (67th)	Winona Ryder	Josephine "Jo" March	Little Women	
1994 (67th)	Susan Sarandon	Regina "Reggie" Love	The Client	
1995 (68th)	Susan Sarandon ‡	Helen Prejean	Dead Man Walking	
1995 (68th)	Elisabeth Shue	Sera	Leaving Las Vegas	
1995 (68th)	Sharon Stone	Ginger McKenna	Casino	
1995 (68th)	Meryl Streep	Francesca Johnson	The Bridges of Madison County	
1995 (68th)	Emma Thompson	Elinor Dashwood	Sense and Sensibility	
1996 (69th)	Frances McDormand ‡	Marge Gunderson	Fargo	
1996 (69th)	Brenda Blethyn	Cynthia Rose Purley	Secrets & Lies	
1996 (69th)	Diane Keaton	Bessie Wakefield	Marvin's Room	
1996 (69th)	Kristin Scott Thomas	Katharine Clifton	The English Patient	
1996 (69th)	Emily Watson	Bess McNeill	Breaking the Waves	
1997 (70th)	Helen Hunt ‡	Carol Connelly	As Good as It Gets	
1997 (70th)	Helena Bonham Carter	Kate Croy	The Wings of the Dove	
1997 (70th)	Julie Christie	Phyllis Hart	Afterglow	
1997 (70th)	Judi Dench	Queen Victoria	Mrs Brown	
1997 (70th)	Kate Winslet	Rose DeWitt Bukater	Titanic	
1998 (71st)	Gwyneth Paltrow ‡	Viola de Lesseps	Shakespeare in Love	
1998 (71st)	Cate Blanchett	Queen Elizabeth I	Elizabeth	
1998 (71st)	Fernanda Montenegro	Isadora "Dora" Teixeira	Central Station	
1998 (71st)	Meryl Streep	Kate Gulden	One True Thing	
1998 (71st)	Emily Watson	Jacqueline du Pré	Hilary and Jackie	
1999 (72nd)	Hilary Swank ‡	Brandon Teena	Boys Don't Cry	
1999 (72nd)	Annette Bening	Carolyn Burnham	American Beauty	
1999 (72nd)	Janet McTeer	Mary Jo Walker	Tumbleweeds	
1999 (72nd)	Julianne Moore	Sarah Miles	The End of the Affair	
1999 (72nd)	Meryl Streep	Roberta Guaspari	Music of the Heart	

=== 2000s ===
Year	Actress	Role(s)	Film	Ref.
2000 (73rd)	Julia Roberts ‡	Erin Brockovich	Erin Brockovich	
2000 (73rd)	Joan Allen	Laine Hanson	The Contender	
2000 (73rd)	Juliette Binoche	Vianne Rocher	Chocolat	
2000 (73rd)	Ellen Burstyn	Sara Goldfarb	Requiem for a Dream	
2000 (73rd)	Laura Linney	Samantha "Sammy" Prescott	You Can Count on Me	
2001 (74th)	Halle Berry ‡	Leticia Musgrove	Monster's Ball	
2001 (74th)	Judi Dench	Iris Murdoch	Iris	
2001 (74th)	Nicole Kidman	Satine	Moulin Rouge!	
2001 (74th)	Sissy Spacek	Ruth Fowler	In the Bedroom	
2001 (74th)	Renée Zellweger	Bridget Jones	Bridget Jones's Diary	
2002 (75th)	Nicole Kidman ‡	Virginia Woolf	The Hours	
2002 (75th)	Salma Hayek	Frida Kahlo	Frida	
2002 (75th)	Diane Lane	Constance "Connie" Sumner	Unfaithful	
2002 (75th)	Julianne Moore	Cathleen "Cathy" Whitaker	Far from Heaven	
2002 (75th)	Renée Zellweger	Roxie Hart	Chicago	
2003 (76th)	Charlize Theron ‡	Aileen Wuornos	Monster	
2003 (76th)	Keisha Castle-Hughes	Paikea Apirana	Whale Rider	
2003 (76th)	Diane Keaton	Erica Jane Barry	Something's Gotta Give	
2003 (76th)	Samantha Morton	Sarah Sullivan	In America	
2003 (76th)	Naomi Watts	Cristina Williams-Peck	21 Grams	
2004 (77th)	Hilary Swank ‡	Maggie Fitzgerald	Million Dollar Baby	
2004 (77th)	Annette Bening	Julia Lambert	Being Julia	
2004 (77th)	Catalina Sandino Moreno	María Álvarez	Maria Full of Grace	
2004 (77th)	Imelda Staunton	Vera Rose Drake	Vera Drake	
2004 (77th)	Kate Winslet	Clementine Kruczynski	Eternal Sunshine of the Spotless Mind	
2005 (78th)	Reese Witherspoon ‡	June Carter Cash	Walk the Line	
2005 (78th)	Judi Dench	Laura Forster-Henderson	Mrs Henderson Presents	
2005 (78th)	Felicity Huffman	Sabrina "Bree" Osbourne	Transamerica	
2005 (78th)	Keira Knightley	Elizabeth Bennet	Pride & Prejudice	
2005 (78th)	Charlize Theron	Josey Aimes	North Country	
2006 (79th)	Helen Mirren ‡	Queen Elizabeth II	The Queen	
2006 (79th)	Penélope Cruz	Raimunda	Volver	
2006 (79th)	Judi Dench	Barbara Covett	Notes on a Scandal	
2006 (79th)	Meryl Streep	Miranda Priestly	The Devil Wears Prada	
2006 (79th)	Kate Winslet	Sarah Pierce	Little Children	
2007 (80th)	Marion Cotillard ‡	Édith Piaf	La Vie en Rose	
2007 (80th)	Cate Blanchett	Queen Elizabeth I	Elizabeth: The Golden Age	
2007 (80th)	Julie Christie	Fiona Anderson	Away from Her	
2007 (80th)	Laura Linney	Wendy Savage	The Savages	
2007 (80th)	Elliot Page^{[D]}	Juno MacGuff	Juno	
2008 (81st)	Kate Winslet ‡	Hanna Schmitz	The Reader	
2008 (81st)	Anne Hathaway	Kym Buchman	Rachel Getting Married	
2008 (81st)	Angelina Jolie	Christine Collins	Changeling	
2008 (81st)	Melissa Leo	Ray Eddy	Frozen River	
2008 (81st)	Meryl Streep	Sister Aloysius Beauvier	Doubt	
2009 (82nd)	Sandra Bullock ‡	Leigh Anne Tuohy	The Blind Side	
2009 (82nd)	Helen Mirren	Countess Sophia Tolstaya	The Last Station	
2009 (82nd)	Carey Mulligan	Jenny Mellor	An Education	
2009 (82nd)	Gabourey Sidibe	Claireece "Precious" Jones	Precious	
2009 (82nd)	Meryl Streep	Julia Child	Julie & Julia	

=== 2010s ===
Year	Actress	Role(s)	Film	Ref.
2010 (83rd)	Natalie Portman ‡	Nina Sayers	Black Swan	
2010 (83rd)	Annette Bening	Dr. Nicole "Nic" Allgood	The Kids Are All Right	
2010 (83rd)	Nicole Kidman	Becca Corbett	Rabbit Hole	
2010 (83rd)	Jennifer Lawrence	Ree Dolly	Winter's Bone	
2010 (83rd)	Michelle Williams	Cynthia "Cindy" Heller	Blue Valentine	
2011 (84th)	Meryl Streep ‡	Margaret Thatcher	The Iron Lady	
2011 (84th)	Glenn Close	Albert Nobbs	Albert Nobbs	
2011 (84th)	Viola Davis	Aibileen Clark	The Help	
2011 (84th)	Rooney Mara	Lisbeth Salander	The Girl with the Dragon Tattoo	
2011 (84th)	Michelle Williams	Marilyn Monroe	My Week with Marilyn	
2012 (85th)	Jennifer Lawrence ‡	Tiffany Maxwell	Silver Linings Playbook	
2012 (85th)	Jessica Chastain	Maya Harris	Zero Dark Thirty	
2012 (85th)	Emmanuelle Riva	Anne Laurent	Amour	
2012 (85th)	Quvenzhané Wallis	Hushpuppy	Beasts of the Southern Wild	
2012 (85th)	Naomi Watts	Maria Bennett	The Impossible	
2013 (86th)	Cate Blanchett ‡	Jeanette "Jasmine" Francis	Blue Jasmine	
2013 (86th)	Amy Adams	Sydney Prosser / Lady Edith Greensly	American Hustle	
2013 (86th)	Sandra Bullock	Ryan Stone	Gravity	
2013 (86th)	Judi Dench	Philomena Lee	Philomena	
2013 (86th)	Meryl Streep	Violet Weston	August: Osage County	
2014 (87th)	Julianne Moore ‡	Alice Howland	Still Alice	
2014 (87th)	Marion Cotillard	Sandra Bya	Two Days, One Night	
2014 (87th)	Felicity Jones	Jane Wilde Hawking	The Theory of Everything	
2014 (87th)	Rosamund Pike	Amy Elliott-Dunne	Gone Girl	
2014 (87th)	Reese Witherspoon	Cheryl Strayed	Wild	
2015 (88th)	Brie Larson ‡	Joy "Ma" Newsome	Room	
2015 (88th)	Cate Blanchett	Carol Aird	Carol	
2015 (88th)	Jennifer Lawrence	Joy Mangano	Joy	
2015 (88th)	Charlotte Rampling	Kate Mercer	45 Years	
2015 (88th)	Saoirse Ronan	Eilis Lacey	Brooklyn	
2016 (89th)	Emma Stone ‡	Mia Dolan	La La Land	
2016 (89th)	Isabelle Huppert	Michèle Leblanc	Elle	
2016 (89th)	Ruth Negga	Mildred Loving	Loving	
2016 (89th)	Natalie Portman	Jacqueline "Jackie" Kennedy	Jackie	
2016 (89th)	Meryl Streep	Florence Foster Jenkins	Florence Foster Jenkins	
2017 (90th)	Frances McDormand ‡	Mildred Hayes	Three Billboards Outside Ebbing, Missouri	
2017 (90th)	Sally Hawkins	Elisa Esposito	The Shape of Water	
2017 (90th)	Margot Robbie	Tonya Harding	I, Tonya	
2017 (90th)	Saoirse Ronan	Christine "Lady Bird" McPherson	Lady Bird	
2017 (90th)	Meryl Streep	Katharine Graham	The Post	
2018 (91st)	Olivia Colman ‡	Queen Anne	The Favourite	
2018 (91st)	Yalitza Aparicio	Cleodegaria "Cleo" Gutiérrez	Roma	
2018 (91st)	Glenn Close	Joan Castleman	The Wife	
2018 (91st)	Lady Gaga	Ally Maine	A Star Is Born	
2018 (91st)	Melissa McCarthy	Leonore Carol "Lee" Israel	Can You Ever Forgive Me?	
2019 (92nd)	Renée Zellweger ‡	Judy Garland	Judy	
2019 (92nd)	Cynthia Erivo	Harriet Tubman	Harriet	
2019 (92nd)	Scarlett Johansson	Nicole Barber	Marriage Story	
2019 (92nd)	Saoirse Ronan	Josephine "Jo" March	Little Women	
2019 (92nd)	Charlize Theron	Megyn Kelly	Bombshell	

=== 2020s ===
Year	Actress	Role(s)	Film	Ref.
2020/21 (93rd)	Frances McDormand ‡	Fern	Nomadland	
2020/21 (93rd)	Viola Davis	Gertrude "Ma" Rainey	Ma Rainey's Black Bottom	
2020/21 (93rd)	Andra Day	Billie Holiday	The United States vs. Billie Holiday	
2020/21 (93rd)	Vanessa Kirby	Martha Weiss	Pieces of a Woman	
2020/21 (93rd)	Carey Mulligan	Cassandra "Cassie" Thomas	Promising Young Woman	
2021 (94th)	Jessica Chastain ‡	Tammy Faye Bakker	The Eyes of Tammy Faye	
2021 (94th)	Olivia Colman	Leda Caruso	The Lost Daughter	
2021 (94th)	Penélope Cruz	Janis Martínez Moreno	Parallel Mothers	
2021 (94th)	Nicole Kidman	Lucille Ball	Being the Ricardos	
2021 (94th)	Kristen Stewart	Diana, Princess of Wales	Spencer	
2022 (95th)	Michelle Yeoh ‡	Evelyn Quan Wang	Everything Everywhere All at Once	
2022 (95th)	Cate Blanchett	Lydia Tár	Tár	
2022 (95th)	Ana de Armas	Norma Jeane	Blonde	
2022 (95th)	Andrea Riseborough	Leslie Rowland	To Leslie	
2022 (95th)	Michelle Williams	Mitzi Fabelman	The Fabelmans	
2023 (96th)	Emma Stone ‡	Bella Baxter	Poor Things	
2023 (96th)	Annette Bening	Diana Nyad	Nyad	
2023 (96th)	Lily Gladstone	Mollie Burkhart	Killers of the Flower Moon	
2023 (96th)	Sandra Hüller	Sandra Voyter	Anatomy of a Fall	
2023 (96th)	Carey Mulligan	Felicia Montealegre	Maestro	
2024 (97th)	Mikey Madison ‡	Anora "Ani" Mikheeva	Anora	
2024 (97th)	Cynthia Erivo	Elphaba Thropp	Wicked	
2024 (97th)	Karla Sofía Gascón	Emilia Pérez / Juan "Manitas" Del Monte	Emilia Pérez	
2024 (97th)	Demi Moore	Elisabeth Sparkle	The Substance	
2024 (97th)	Fernanda Torres	Eunice Paiva	I'm Still Here	
2025 (98th)	Jessie Buckley ‡	Agnes Shakespeare	Hamnet	
2025 (98th)	Rose Byrne	Linda	If I Had Legs I'd Kick You	
2025 (98th)	Kate Hudson	Claire Sardina	Song Sung Blue	
2025 (98th)	Renate Reinsve	Nora Borg	Sentimental Value	
2025 (98th)	Emma Stone	Michelle Fuller	Bugonia	

== Multiple wins and nominations ==
The following individuals won two or more Academy Awards for Best Actress:

Wins	Actress	Nominations	Years won
4	Katharine Hepburn	12	1932-33, 1967, 1968, 1981
3	Frances McDormand	3	1996, 2017, 2020-21
2	Meryl Streep	17	1982, 2011
2	Bette Davis	11	1935, 1938
2	Ingrid Bergman	6	1944, 1956
2	Jane Fonda	6	1971, 1978
2	Elizabeth Taylor	5	1960, 1966
2	Olivia de Havilland	4	1946, 1949
2	Glenda Jackson	4	1970, 1973
2	Jodie Foster	3	1988, 1991
2	Emma Stone	3	2016, 2023
2	Sally Field	2	1979, 1984
2	Vivien Leigh	2	1939, 1951
2	Luise Rainer	2	1936, 1937
2	Hilary Swank	2	1999, 2004

The following individuals received three or more Best Actress nominations:

Nominations	Actress
17	Meryl Streep
12	Katharine Hepburn
11	Bette Davis
7	Greer Garson
6	Ingrid Bergman
6	Jane Fonda
6	Deborah Kerr
6	Sissy Spacek
5	Anne Bancroft
5	Cate Blanchett
5	Ellen Burstyn
5	Judi Dench
5	Irene Dunne
5	Susan Hayward
5	Audrey Hepburn
5	Jessica Lange
5	Shirley MacLaine
5	Susan Sarandon
5	Norma Shearer
5	Elizabeth Taylor
4	Annette Bening
4	Julie Christie
4	Glenn Close
4	Olivia de Havilland
4	Glenda Jackson
4	Jennifer Jones
4	Diane Keaton
4	Nicole Kidman
4	Marsha Mason
4	Geraldine Page
4	Vanessa Redgrave
4	Rosalind Russell
4	Barbara Stanwyck
4	Kate Winslet
4	Joanne Woodward
4	Jane Wyman
3	Julie Andrews
3	Claudette Colbert
3	Joan Crawford
3	Faye Dunaway
3	Joan Fontaine
3	Jodie Foster
3	Greta Garbo
3	Jennifer Lawrence
3	Frances McDormand
3	Julianne Moore
3	Carey Mulligan
3	Eleanor Parker
3	Saoirse Ronan
3	Emma Stone
3	Gloria Swanson
3	Charlize Theron
3	Emma Thompson
3	Michelle Williams
3	Debra Winger
3	Renée Zellweger

== Age superlatives ==
Record	Actor	Film	Year	Age	Ref.
Oldest Winner	Jessica Tandy	Driving Miss Daisy	1990	80	
Oldest Nominee	Emmanuelle Riva	Amour	2013	85	
Youngest Winner	Marlee Matlin	Children of a Lesser God	1987	21	
Youngest Nominee	Quvenzhané Wallis	Beasts of the Southern Wild	2013	9	

== Films with multiple Leading Actress nominations ==
Winners are in bold.

- All About Eve (1950) – Anne Baxter and Bette Davis
- Suddenly, Last Summer (1959) – Katharine Hepburn and Elizabeth Taylor
- The Turning Point (1977) – Anne Bancroft and Shirley MacLaine
- Terms of Endearment (1983) – **Shirley MacLaine** and Debra Winger
- Thelma & Louise (1991) – Geena Davis and Susan Sarandon

== Multiple character nominations ==
The following were nominated for their portrayals of the same fictional or non-fictional character in separate films (including variations of the original).

- Billie Holiday from Lady Sings the Blues (Diana Ross, 1972) and The United States vs. Billie Holiday (Andra Day, 2021)
- Josephine "Jo" March from Little Women (Winona Ryder, 1994) and Little Women (Saoirse Ronan, 2019)
- Leslie Crosbie from The Letter (Jeanne Eagels, 1929) and The Letter (Bette Davis, 1940)
- Marilyn Monroe from My Week with Marilyn (Michelle Williams, 2011) and Blonde (Ana de Armas, 2022)
- Queen Elizabeth I from Elizabeth (Cate Blanchett, 1998) and Elizabeth: The Golden Age (Cate Blanchett, 2007)
- Vicki Lester (née Esther (Victoria) Blodgett) from A Star Is Born (Janet Gaynor, 1937) and A Star Is Born (Judy Garland, 1954)
  - Ally Maine (née Campano) from A Star Is Born (Lady Gaga, 2018)

== See also ==
- Academy Award for Best Actor
- Actor Award for Outstanding Performance by a Female Actor in a Leading Role
- BAFTA Award for Best Actress in a Leading Role
- Best Actress
- César Award for Best Actress
- Critics' Choice Movie Award for Best Actress
- Golden Globe Award for Best Actress in a Motion Picture – Drama
- Golden Globe Award for Best Actress in a Motion Picture – Musical or Comedy
- Independent Spirit Award for Best Lead Performance
- Lists of acting awards
- List of actors with Academy Award nominations
- List of actors with more than one Academy Award nomination in the acting categories
- List of actors with two or more Academy Awards in acting categories
- List of film awards for lead actress

== Notes ==
A^{1} ^{2} : Rules at the time of the first three ceremonies allowed for a performer to receive a single nomination which could honor their work in more than one film. Greta Garbo and Norma Shearer were both nominated for two different roles in the same category. Current Academy rules forbid this from happening. No official reason was ever given as to why Shearer won the award for only one of the two films she was listed for.
B: Bette Davis's performance in Of Human Bondage was not nominated for an Oscar. Several influential people at the time campaigned to have her name included on the list, so for that year (and the following year also) the Academy relaxed its rules and allowed a write-in vote. Technically this meant that any performance was eligible to win the award, whether or not the person was an official nominee. While the Academy does not officially recognize this as a nomination for Davis, it has included her in the list of nominees for the 1935 ceremony on its official website.
C^{1} ^{2} : Katharine Hepburn and Barbra Streisand received the same number of votes, resulting in both actresses receiving the award, according to Academy rules.
D: Elliot Page was nominated as Ellen Page, before his gender transition in 2020.

== Bibliography ==
- Crouse, Richard (2005). Reel Winners: Movie Award Trivia. Toronto, Ontario, Canada: University of Toronto Press. ISBN 978-1-55002-574-3.
- Levy, Emanuel (2003), All About Oscar: The History and Politics of the Academy Awards, New York, United States: Continuum International Publishing Group, ISBN 978-0-82641-452-6
- Thise, Mark (2008), Hollywood Winners & Losers A to Z, New York, United States: Limelight Editions, ISBN 978-0-87910-351-4
- Wiley, Mason; Bona, Damien (1996), Inside Oscar: The Unofficial History of the Academy Awards (5 ed.), New York, United States: Ballantine Books, ISBN 978-0-34540-053-6, OCLC 779680732
