= List of awards and nominations received by Janet McTeer =

Janet McTeer awards and nominations
- McTeer in 2015
Awards and nominations
Award	Wins	Nominations
Academy Awards	0	2
Actor Awards	0	2
Critics' Choice Awards	0	2
Emmy Awards	0	1
Golden Globe Awards	1	4
Olivier Awards	1	6
Tony Awards	1	3

Totals (Note: Certain award groups do not simply award one winner. They acknowledge several different recipients, have runners-up, and have third place. Since this is a specific recognition and is different from losing an award, runner-up mentions are considered wins in this award tally. For simplification and to avoid errors, each award in this list has been presumed to have had a prior nomination.)
- Wins: 8
- Nominations: 36

Janet McTeer is an English actress known for her varied roles on stage and screen. She has received various accolades including a Golden Globe Award, a Laurence Olivier Award and a Tony Award as well as nominations for two Academy Awards, two Actor Awards, two Critics' Choice Awards and a Primetime Emmy Award. In 2008 she was appointed an Officer of the Order of the British Empire (OBE) for her services to drama.

On film, she portrayed a free-spirited single mother in the comedy Tumbleweeds (1999) for which she received the Golden Globe Award for Best Actress – Motion Picture Musical or Comedy as well as nominations for the Academy Award for Best Actress, the Actor Award for Outstanding Actress in a Leading Role and the Independent Spirit Award for Best Female Lead. She portrayed a woman disguising herself as a male house painter in the period drama Albert Nobbs (2011) for which she was nominated for the Academy Award for Best Supporting Actress, the Actors Award for Outstanding Actress in a Supporting Role and the Golden Globe Award for Best Supporting Actress – Motion Picture.

On television, she portrayed Clementine Churchill in the HBO television film Into the Storm (2009) for which she was nominated for the Primetime Emmy Award for Outstanding Supporting Actress in a Miniseries or a Movie and the Golden Globe Award for Best Supporting Actress – Series, Miniseries or Television Film. She played Jacquetta of Luxembourg in the BBC One historical miniseries The White Queen (2013) for which she was nominated for the Golden Globe Award for Best Supporting Actress - Series, Miniseries or Television Film. She played the head of MI6 in the BBC Two political spy series The Honourable Woman (2014) earning a nomination for the Critics' Choice Television Award for Best Supporting Actress in a Movie/Miniseries and Helen Pierce, a ruthless attorney representing the cartel in the Netflix crime drma series Ozark (from 2018 to 2020) for which she was nominated for the Critics' Choice Television Award for Best Supporting Actress in a Drama Series.

On stage, she portrayed Nora Helmer in the Henrik Ibsen play A Doll's House (1997) in both the West End and on Broadway for which she earned the Laurence Olivier Award for Best Actress and the Tony Award for Best Actress in a Play respectively. She was Olivier-nominated for her performances in The Grace of Mary Traverse (1986), Uncle Vanya (1992), Mary Stuart (2006), Les Liaisons Dangereuses (2016), Phaedra (2023). She received further Tony Award nominations for her performances in Mary Stuart (2009) and Bernhardt/Hamlet (2019).

== Major associations ==
=== Academy Awards ===
Year	Category	Nominated work	Result	Ref.
1999	Best Actress	Tumbleweeds	Nominated	
2011	Best Supporting Actress	Albert Nobbs	Nominated	

=== Actor Awards ===
Year	Category	Nominated work	Result	Ref.
1999	Outstanding Actress in a Leading Role	Tumbleweeds	Nominated	
2011	Outstanding Actress in a Supporting Role	Albert Nobbs	Nominated	

=== Critics' Choice Awards ===
Year	Category	Nominated work	Result	Ref.
Critics' Choice Television Awards
2015	Best Supporting Actress in a Movie/Limited Series	The Honorable Woman	Nominated	
2021	Best Supporting Actress in a Drama Series	Ozark	Nominated	

=== Emmy Awards ===
Year	Category	Nominated work	Result	Ref.
2009	Outstanding Supporting Actress in a Miniseries or a Movie	Into the Storm	Nominated	

=== Golden Globe Awards ===
Year	Category	Nominated work	Result	Ref.
1999	Best Actress – Motion Picture Musical or Comedy	Tumbleweeds	Won	
2009	Best Supporting Actress – Television	Into the Storm	Nominated	
2011	Best Supporting Actress – Motion Picture	Albert Nobbs	Nominated	
2013	Best Supporting Actress - Television	The White Queen	Nominated	

=== Laurence Olivier Awards ===
Year	Category	Nominated work	Result	Ref.
1986	Most Promising Newcomer of the Year in Theatre	The Grace of Mary Traverse	Nominated	
1992	Actress of the Year	Uncle Vanya	Nominated	
1997	Best Actress	A Doll's House	Won	
2006	Best Actress	Mary Stuart	Nominated	
2016	Best Actress	Les Liaisons Dangereuses	Nominated	
2023	Best Actress	Phaedra	Nominated	

=== Tony Awards ===
Year	Category	Nominated work	Result	Ref.
1997	Best Actress in a Play	A Doll's House	Won	
2009	Best Actress in a Play	Mary Stuart	Nominated	
2019	Best Actress in a Play	Bernhardt/Hamlet	Nominated	

== Miscellaneous awards ==
Year	Award	Work	Result
1999	Independent Spirit Award for Best Female Lead	Tumbleweeds	Nominated
1999	National Board of Review Award for Best Actress	Tumbleweeds	Won
1999	Satellite Award for Best Actress – Motion Picture Musical or Comedy	Tumbleweeds	Won
1999	Chicago Film Critics Association Award for Best Actress	Tumbleweeds	Nominated
1999	Chicago Film Critics Association Award for Most Promising Actress	Tumbleweeds	Nominated
1999	London Film Critics Circle Award for Actress of the Year	Tumbleweeds	Nominated
1999	New York Film Critics Circle Award for Best Actress	Tumbleweeds	Nominated
1999	Online Film Critics Society Award for Best Actress	Tumbleweeds	Nominated
2000	Sundance Film Festival – Special Jury Prize for Outstanding Ensemble Performance	Songcatcher	Won
2009	Satellite Award for Best Supporting Actress – Series, Miniseries or Television Film	Into the Storm	Nominated
2011	Independent Spirit Award for Best Supporting Female	Albert Nobbs	Nominated
2011	Denver Film Critics Society Award for Best Supporting Actress	Albert Nobbs	Nominated
2011	Houston Film Critics Society Award for Best Supporting Actress	Albert Nobbs	Nominated
2011	Los Angeles Film Critics Association Award for Best Supporting Actress	Albert Nobbs	Nominated
2011	Online Film Critics Society Award for Best Supporting Actress	Albert Nobbs	Nominated
2011	Satellite Award for Best Supporting Actress – Motion Picture	Albert Nobbs	Nominated

== Theater awards ==
Year	Award	Category	Work	Result	Ref.
1997	Critics Circle Award	Best Actress	A Doll's House	Won	
1997	Drama Desk Award	Outstanding Actress in a Play	A Doll's House	Won	
