= The Singular Life of Albert Nobbs =

1977 play by Simone Benmussa

- Original language: French
- Written by: Simone Benmussa; Barbara Wright (translator)

Premiere
- Date: November 1977
- Place: Paris, France

The Singular Life of Albert Nobbs (French: La Vie singulière d'Albert Nobbs) is a play by French author Simone Benmussa. Based on a novella by George Moore, the drama tells the story of a 19th-century woman who disguises herself as a man to avoid poverty. The role of Albert Nobbs was originated by French actress Juliet Berto. The drama premiered in November 1977 at the Théâtre d'Orsay in Paris.

== Synopsis ==
Having spent much of his life disguised as a man, Dublin hotel butler Albert Nobbs is shocked when he meets a female painter, Hubert Page, who is also living as a man. Upon seeing Hubert's happy domestic situation, Albert resolves to set up a similar arrangement for himself.

== Cast History ==
Character	1978 British Cast New End Theatre	Original 1982 Off-Broadway cast	2011 Film cast
Albert Nobbs	Susannah York	Glenn Close	Glenn Close
Hubert Page	Stephanie Beacham	Lucinda Childs	Janet McTeer
Helen Dawes	Julia Foster	Pippa Pearthree	Mia Wasikowska
Madge Baker	Nan Munro	Patricia O'Connell	Pauline Collins

== Performance history ==
The play's English language version premiered on 27 June 1978 at London's New End Theatre with Susannah York in the lead. Translated by Barbara Wright, it was subsequently staged in Rome with Maddalena Cripa and in Ireland with Jane Brennan.

In 1982, Albert Nobbs premiered Off-Broadway at New York City's Manhattan Theater Club with Glenn Close in the main role. She won an Obie Award for Best Actress for her performance as Nobbs. A version starring Judy Braha ran at Boston's New Ehrlich Theatre in 1984.

The original French production was revived in Paris in 1988 with Aurore Clément in the title role. She won a Révélation Théâtrale prize from the Syndicat de la Critique Dramatique for her performance.

== Adaptations ==
In 2011 the play was made into a film directed by Rodrigo García and starring Glenn Close.
