= The Intended =

- Directed by: Kristian Levring
- Written by: Janet McTeer, Kristian Levring
- Starring: Janet McTeer; JJ Feild; Olympia Dukakis; Brenda Fricker; Tony Maudsley; JJ Feild; David Bradley; Philip Jackson; John Matthew Lau; Robert Pugh
- Release date: 2002
- Country: United Kingdom

The Intended is a 2002 English-language period drama film directed by Kristian Levring and starring Janet McTeer (who also co-wrote the screenplay), JJ Feild, Olympia Dukakis, Tony Maudsley and Brenda Fricker. It centres on a surveyor and his fiancée who arrive in a remote Malaysian trading post and encounter a close-fisted ivory trader and her ill-meaning family.

== Cast ==
- Janet McTeer as Sarah Morris
- JJ Feild as Hamish Winslow
- Olympia Dukakis as Erina
- Brenda Fricker as Mrs. Jones
- Tony Maudsley as William Jones
- David Bradley as The Priest
- Philip Jackson as Norton
- John Matthew Lau as Judas
- Robert Pugh as Le Blanc

== Reception ==
The Intended currently holds a 33% rating on the Rotten Tomatoes website.
