= Gavin O'Connor (filmmaker) =

American filmmaker (born 1963)

- Born: December 24, 1963 (age 62); Huntington, New York, U.S.
- Education: University of Pennsylvania
- Occupations: Director; screenwriter; producer; playwright; actor
- Years active: 1992–present
- Spouses: Angela Shelton (m. 1995; div. 1996) Brooke Burns (m. 2013)
- Children: 1

Gavin O'Connor (born December 24, 1963) is an American film director, screenwriter, producer, playwright, and actor. He is best known for directing the films Miracle (2004), Warrior (2011), The Accountant (2016), and The Way Back (2020).

== Early life ==
O'Connor was raised in Huntington, New York, on Long Island.

== Career ==
In 1992 he wrote and produced Ted Demme's directorial debut, the short film The Bet.

Three years later, he made his own feature film co–writing and directing debut with Comfortably Numb, about the moral dilemmas facing a Connecticut preppie-turned-New York City prosecutor; the film was screened at both the Cannes Film Festival and the Boston Film Festival. O'Connor then turned to the stage, producing, writing, and starring in the Off-Broadway play Rumblings of a Romance Renaissance in 1997.

At the same time, O'Connor began work on a screenplay based on then-wife Angela Shelton's memories of her childhood spent on the road with her serial-marrying mother.

Impressed by Tony Award-winning British actress Janet McTeer's appearance on Charlie Rose's talk show in 1997, he was determined to cast her in what had become Tumbleweeds (in which he co-starred); he and Shelton were forced to finance the film themselves after being unable to find backers. The movie won the Filmmakers Trophy at the Sundance Film Festival; McTeer's performance earned her a Golden Globe as Best Actress and Academy Award and Screen Actors Guild nominations in the same category; and Kimberly J. Brown, cast as her pre-teen daughter, won an Independent Spirit Award for Best Debut Performance.

In 2004, after serving as executive producer of several smaller, independent projects, O'Connor directed the film Miracle, based on the true story about the American ice hockey team's victory over the Soviet Union at the 1980 Winter Olympics. He also produced the Mark Kerr HBO documentary film, The Smashing Machine.

O'Connor filmed the MMA film Warrior, for which he wrote the screenplay and directed. The film received a 2011 release, through Lions Gate Entertainment.

In 2013, O'Connor was working on adapting the novel The Hustler into a stage play. In April 2013, he signed on to direct Jane Got a Gun.

He executive produced and directed the pilot episode of the FX series The Americans. He directed and produced the pilot episode of the Netflix series Seven Seconds. In June 2014, O'Connor was set to direct his upcoming action-adventure film, Massacre in the Himalayas, which Gianni Nunnari's Hollywood Gang Productions will produce about the murder of ten climbers and the local Pakistani cook who are intent on conquering the K2 summit. He was also set to direct the WWII drama Atlantic Wall, starring Bradley Cooper.

On September 6, 2017, O'Connor landed the roles of director and writer of The Suicide Squad. By October, O'Connor had exited the project due to his story treatment reportedly being identical to Birds of Prey, as well as his commitments to The Way Back.

In November 2025, O'Connor signed on to direct Running for Apple Studios.

== Personal life ==
O'Connor married actress Brooke Burns on June 22, 2013. He was previously married to Angela Shelton.

== Filmography ==
=== Film ===
Year	Title				
Year	Title	Director	Writer	Producer	Notes
1992	The Bet	No	Yes	Executive	Short film
1995	Comfortably Numb	Yes	Yes	Yes	Directorial debut
1999	Tumbleweeds	Yes	Yes	Executive	
2004	Miracle	Yes	No	No	
2008	Pride and Glory	Yes	Yes	No	
2011	Warrior	Yes	Yes	Yes	
2015	Brothers	No	Story	No	Remake of Warrior in Hindi
2015	Jane Got a Gun	Yes	No	No	
2016	The Accountant	Yes	No	Executive	
2020	The Way Back	Yes	No	Yes	
2025	The Accountant 2	Yes	No	Executive	
TBA	Running	Yes	No	No	Filming

Producer only

Year	Title	Notes
2002	The Smashing Machine	Documentary; Executive producer
2002	The Slaughter Rule	
2007	Elvis and Anabelle	Executive producer

Acting credits

Year	Title	Role
1999	Tumbleweeds	Jack Ranson
2001	The Glass House	Whitey
2011	Warrior	J.J. Riley (uncredited)

=== Television ===
Year	Title	Director	Executive Producer	Writer	Notes
2004	Clubhouse	Yes	No	Yes	Episode "Pilot"
2013–2014	The Americans	Yes	Yes	No	Episode "Pilot"
2017	Seven Seconds	Yes	Yes	No	Episode "Pilot"
2021	Mare of Easttown	No	Yes	No	
