= The Bet (1992 film) =

- Directed by: Ted Demme
- Written by: Gavin O'Connor
- Produced by: Michael Miller
- Starring: Josh Mosby; John B. Hickey
- Cinematography: Adam Kimmel
- Edited by: Hughes Winborne
- Release date: 1992
- Running time: 21 minutes
- Language: English

The Bet is a 1992 American short film directed by Ted Demme, written by Gavin O'Connor, and starring Josh Mosby and John B. Hickey. The soundtrack was composed by John Terelle of the Hawaiian Pups and Michael Wolff with Lou Marini.

== Plot ==
Two brothers Harry and Henry Hicks, run a New York deli they've inherited from their father. Younger brother Harry then develops a gambling problem.

== Cast ==
- Josh Mosby as Harry
- John B. Hickey as Henry
- Vinny Pastore as Nino
- David Little as Lenny
- Anthony Crivello as Carbo
- Pete Castelli as Man Placing Bet
