= Kristian Levring =

Danish film director (born 1957)

- Born: 9 May 1957 (age 68); Copenhagen, Denmark
- Occupation(s): Film director, screenwriter, film editor

Kristian Levring (Danish: [ˈkʰʁestjæn ˈlewʁeŋ, ˈkʰʁæs-]; born 9 May 1957) is a Danish film director. He was the fourth signatory of the Dogme 95 movement. His feature films as director include Et skud fra hjertet, The King is Alive, The Intended, Fear Me Not, and The Salvation.

== Early life ==
Kristian Levring was born in 1957 in Copenhagen. He graduated from the National Film School of Denmark in 1988.

== Career ==
Kristian Levring began his career as a documentarian, editing a number of feature-length documentaries and Danish-language feature films during the first two decades of his time as a filmmaker. He has also worked as a director of television commercials: he has directed more than 300 commercials in his career, winning many awards for them in Denmark and abroad. In 1986, he released his feature debut Et skud fra hjertet (A Shot from the Heart). The director himself described his debut as a fiasco, the film was badly received by audiences and critics. Nevertheless, Levring described it as a necessary and important step in his career, an important milestone in his professional development.

Kristian Levring was the fourth signatory of the Dogme95 movement, however moved away from this style towards the end of the aughts. He co-signed the original manifesto in 1995 alongside Lars von Trier, Thomas Vinterberg, and Søren Kragh-Jacobsen. In 2008, Levring and the other Dogme 95 founders were honoured with the Achievement in World Cinema award at the European Film Awards.

=== The King is Alive ===
Levring released the film The King is Alive in 2000. It was shot in Namibia on a budget of $2.5 mln.

The plot is based on the story of "bus passengers stranded in the Namibian desert, who decide to stage their own private performance of King Lear to pass the time until help arrives." The passengers are stranded in an abandoned mining town in the middle of the Sahara. The film utilized Lear as a foil for European society reaching a terminal crisis. The words of Lear are used to further show the disintegration of the group into chaos under the pressure of their stranding. While one of the members is sent on a five-day journey to get help, the social relationships that Levring explores among those that stay behind include gender, marital, and the racial elements of the relationship between the passengers and the bus driver. The film was nominated for Un Certain Regard at the Cannes Film Festival and won at the Film Camera Festival in Bitola. Jennifer Jason Leigh won the Best Actress Award at the Tokyo Intl. Film Festival.

The film has many elements in line with the Dogme95 cinematic beliefs, including placing film as a post-apocalyptic art form. Jan Simons wrote that, "The King is Alive allows us to see Dogma 95 in actu, as it were. With no decor and no costumes, in the natural light of the sun's glare, and with no recourse to the technical resources of theatre, the amateur actors study their roles; Henry writes everybody's lines out by hand, from memory." Referencing to the rules of Dogma 95 are also found throughout the film. The New York Times wrote of Levring's work on the film that,

"Mr. Levring's vision of hell is vivid and stark but -- thanks to that empty, endless desert -- touched with a pictorial sublimity rarely attempted within the constraints of the Dogma aesthetic. The unsparing, invasive naturalism of digital video, which seems specially calibrated to register the play of anxiety and distress on human faces, also records an inhuman landscape of undulating dunes and blinding sky. The juxtaposition creates a sense of loneliness and panic, a stomach-turning dread that makes the survival instinct look almost comically weak."

=== The Intended ===
In 2002, Levring co-wrote and directed The Intended. The film follows two British expatriates and their lives in a remote Asian ivory trading station during the early 1900s, where the small community falls apart under the pressures of the foreign lands and daily struggles to survive. The film has been described as, "an expressionistic and densely textured revisitation of The Heart of Darkness in the jungles of Malaysia." The film opened at the Toronto International Film Festival. Though the movie received mixed reviews, it was generally praised for intensity, striking visuals, and strong acting.

=== Fear Me Not ===
In 2008, Levring released Fear Me Not. The film explores the issues of prescription medication on the psychology of families, following the protagonist as they try the use of antidepressants to cure his malaise stemming from workaholism. The protagonist soon becomes paranoid and starts to fear his spouse. The plot is reminiscent of the narrative of Dr. Jekyll and Mr. Hyde, and debuted at the Toronto International Film Festival, where the rights were sold to IFC. The film also opened at the Toronto International Film Festival.

=== The Salvation ===
Levring's western film titled The Salvation, starred Mads Mikkelsen and was screened at the 2014 Cannes Film Festival, where it became an Official Selection. Levring filmed the movie in South Africa, setting it in the American frontier. The story follows the character Jon, a Danish "ex-soldier who moved to the States after losing to the Germans on the battlefield in 1864," according to Variety. Levring has stated that during this era, about half of all people on the American frontier did not speak English, which was the entry-point for him to produce a film about the American west. In developing the film, Levring used both Western films and Nordic mythology as inspiration. In an interview with Reader's Digest, Levring stated of the film's subject matter that, "You could see the Western frontier as the beginning of civilization, and I’m very interested in the nature of civilization. Often these places are a microscope: you can look at these characters and see how they behave in quite extreme situations. Civilization is quite a thin varnish, and when you take that away it’s interesting to see what happens." Levring both cowrote and directed the film.

== Filmography ==
=== Feature films ===
- A Shot from the Heart (1986)
- The King Is Alive (2000)
- The Intended (2002)
- Fear Me Not (2008)
- The Salvation (2014)

== Sources ==
- Monggaard, Christian (2008). "Power Game in an Ice-Cold World" (PDF). Film (63). Det Danske Filminstitut.
