= Comfortably Numb (film) =

1995 film by Gavin O'Connor

- Directed by: Gavin O'Connor
- Written by: Kirby Hayde; Gavin O'Connor
- Produced by: Gavin O'Connor; Greg O'Connor
- Starring: Dana Ashbrook; Angela Shelton; Harry Lennix; Tovah Feldshuh
- Cinematography: Alik Sakharov
- Edited by: Hughes Winborne
- Music by: Mader
- Production company: Shooting Gallery
- Distributed by: Meistrich Corporation
- Release date: 1995
- Running time: 100 minutes
- Country: United States
- Language: English

Comfortably Numb is a 1995 American independent drama film co-written and directed by Gavin O'Connor. It is also named after Pink Floyd’s 1979 song Comfortably Numb.

== Plot ==
William pursues his aspiration of being a prosecutor and also finds happiness with his new love Meadow, but their partying lifestyle develops into a heroin addiction that destroys their lives.

== Cast ==
- Dana Ashbrook as William Best
- Angela Shelton as Meadow Adare
- Harry Lennix as Hamlin Day
- Tovah Feldshuh as Victoria Stevens
- Mary Beth Peil as Emily Best

== Release ==
Comfortably Numb was rated NC-17 in the United States by the Motion Picture Association of America for "scenes of graphic drug use and some explicit sexuality".

The film was given a limited theatrical release in the US by Meistrich Corporation in 1995 and was released on DVD in Canada by Alliance Atlantis on August 14, 2007.

== Reception ==
Variety wrote, "Comfortably Numb is a smartly mounted pic with no star power and a story-line about the moral dilemmas facing a Connecticut preppie-turned-NYC prosecutor. Unfortunately, it takes a fatal turn halfway through by becoming a lurid antidrug tract and never recovers. Pic showcases talents of cast and crew, but B.O. prospects are nil."
