= Simone Benmussa =

Algerian born writer and theatre director

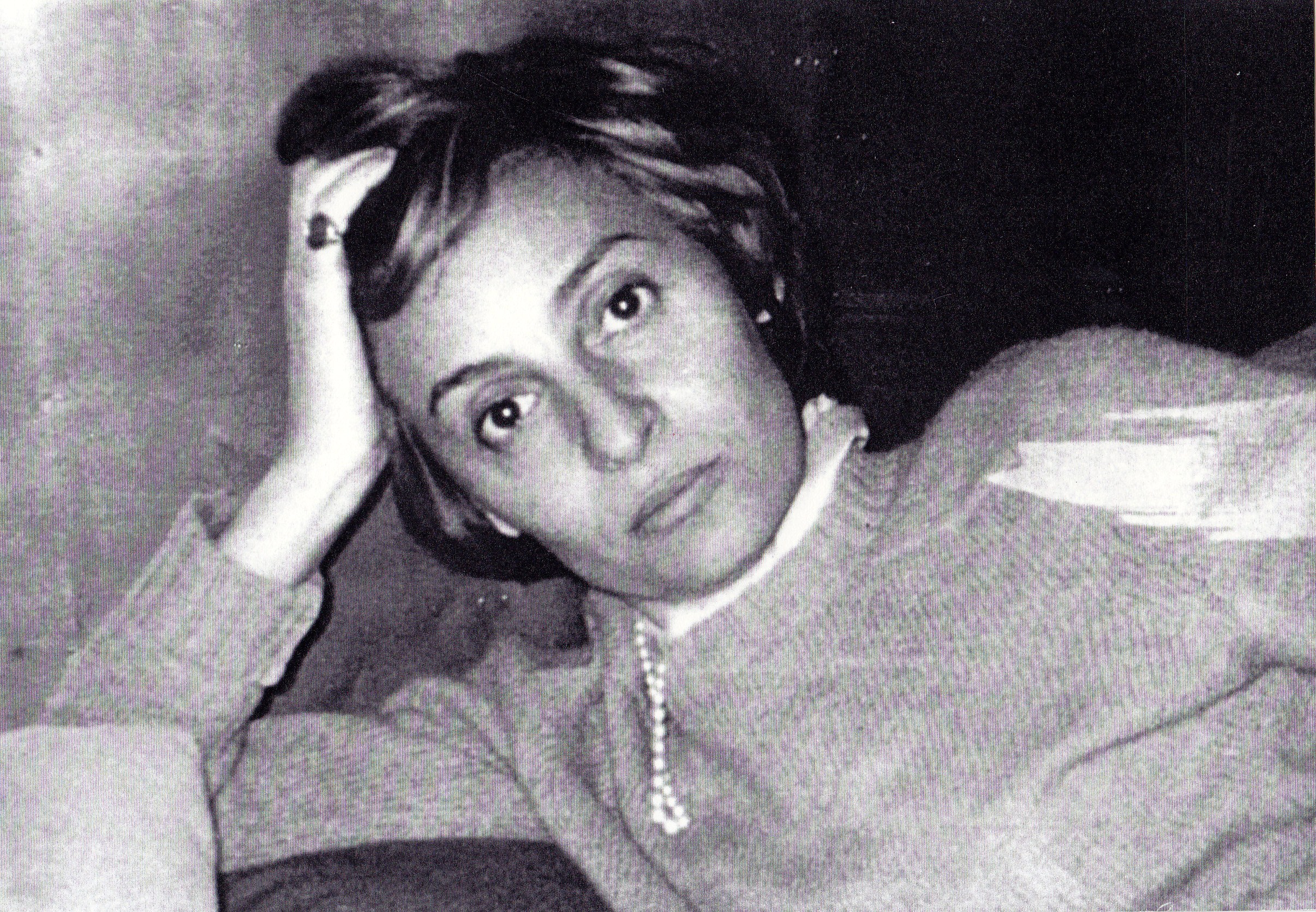
- Born: 5 June 1932; Tunis, Tunisia
- Died: 4 June 2001 (aged 68); Paris, France

Simone Benmussa (5 June 1932 – 4 June 2001) was a Tunisian-born French writer and theatre director. One of her best known plays was The Singular Life of Albert Nobbs.

== Biography ==
She was born into a Jewish family in Tunis and attended the private Catholic school Notre-Dame de Sion there. She studied philosophy at the Sorbonne and also attended Sciences Po. She went on to work at various theatres with Jean-Louis Barrault. From 1957 to 1989, she was editor-in-chief for Les Cahiers Renaud-Barrault. When French president Charles de Gaulle removed Barrault from the directorship of the Odéon-Théâtre de l'Europe because of his support for the student revolt of 1968, Benmussa was put in charge of theatrical works at publisher Éditions Gallimard.

Although she wrote her own play narratives, Benmussa was perhaps best known for her play The Singular Life of Albert Nobbs, which was based on a short story by George Moore. Her play was translated into English and performed in London and New York City. She also developed plays from the works of Henry James, Sigmund Freud, Virginia Woolf, Tolstoy, Nathalie Sarraute, Edith Wharton, Gertrude Stein and others.

She published several books and produced a documentary film Regards sur Nathalie Sarraute in 1978

She received an Obie Award and the Prix de la révélation théâtrale de l'année du Syndicat de la critique.

Benmussa died of cancer at the age of 68.

== Publications ==
- Eugène Ionesco, essays (1966)
- Le Prince répète le prince, novel (1984)
- Qui êtes-vous, Nathalie Sarraute, essays (1987)
