= Martial Corneville =

- Occupation: make-up artist
- Years active: 1989-present

Martial Corneville is a make-up artist.

On January 24, 2012, he was nominated for an Academy Award for the movie Albert Nobbs.
