= Five Days (TV series) =

British dramatic television series

- Genre: Crime drama
- Written by: Gwyneth Hughes
- Directed by: Otto Bathurst; Simon Curtis
- Starring: Hugh Bonneville; David Oyelowo; Sarah Smart; Edward Woodward
- Music by: Magnus Fiennes
- Countries of origin: United Kingdom; United States
- No. of series: 2
- No. of episodes: 10

Production
- Running time: 57-63 minutes

Original release
- Network: BBC One (UK); HBO (US)
- Release: 23 January 2007 – 5 March 2010

Related
- Hunter

Five Days is a British drama television series produced by the BBC in association with HBO. The first series was first broadcast on BBC One from 23 January to 1 February 2007, and repeated on BBC Four from 9 to 13 April 2007.

The first series follows five non-consecutive days (days 1, 3, 28, 33 and 79) of a police investigation into the disappearance of a young mother and her two children. It was written by Gwyneth Hughes and directed by Otto Bathurst and Simon Curtis. Music for the series was composed by Magnus Fiennes.

A two-part spin-off called Hunter was broadcast on BBC One in January 2009. A second series of Five Days was developed by the BBC and broadcast on 1 March 2010 to 5 March 2010.

== Series one ==
=== Plot ===
Leanne Wellings prepares to visit her grandfather, who resides in a convalescent home. She takes her two young children Rosie and Ethan, and calls up the stairs to Tanya, her daughter from an earlier marriage, to join them. Tanya makes an excuse to avoid going. Leanne eventually leaves with Ethan and Rosie. Leanne rushes to collect a dog from the shelter before it closes. She then drives to her grandfather, new dog in tow, but stops at a lay-by to buy him some flowers from a van. A lorry draws up at the same time. The children lose sight of their mother as they sit in the car. Leanne does not return and the bewildered children start to walk away from the car. Leanne's husband Mat works at a local gym. It is here that several of the film's characters are introduced: Press Officer Defne Topcu ignores loner Kyle as he tries to make a conversation. In another scene, Leanne's parents, Barbara and John are introduced. The family slowly learn of Leanne's disappearance, and that Rosie and Ethan are now missing too. Kyle seems to have picked them up in a white van. The police begin the investigation, but the Press Officer feels there is a lack of support, and the DSI in charge is relatively new in the position.

Matt's best friend, Gary, who is about to retire from the military, complains of not having enough pension to live on. Matt gets him a job at the gym where he works, and the police recruit him to spy on Matt, paying him for information.

The police begin a house to house investigation. Meanwhile, DC Stephen Beam wakes up Sarah Wheeler, who has jet-lag and is disoriented. On learning the time from Beam, she dashes out of her flat, and opens a shed door to dump her rubbish. There, crouching in the darkness, she finds Ethan, and the dog. Ethan says that he was supposed to look after Rosie. Sarah is seen as a heroine for finding him. Ethan tells the police that his dog bit a man, who had a dirty white van. Kyle's mother Hazel becomes suspicious of his actions. His hand is damaged, and he begins to wash his white van every day despite previously never washing it.

Defne eventually persuades Matt to give a press conference, and Barbara agrees to speak as well. The press conference doesn't go well, and Josh asks Matt if he knew that Leanne was pregnant, having acquired the information from her grandfather. Matt, clearly shaken, walks out. It is left to Barbara to appeal to whoever has any information about Leanne's whereabouts. At first, she is calm, then she gives in to a scream of panic and grief in front of everyone. After the debacle, DSI Barclay is rapped by his superior for not participating and supporting the press. He remains aloof but agrees to help.

Meanwhile, journalist Josh Fairley smells a story and persuades his editor to run a picture of attractive Leanne on their front page. Josh's is a small local newspaper, and he wants to run a more exciting story than golden weddings. He publishes Leanne's picture, despite getting the brush off from Defne, who is trying to keep the story relatively low profile. Josh takes photos for the paper at the home where Vic, Leanne's grandfather, lives. Josh manages to converse with Vic about his granddaughter. He eventually persuades Vic to loan him the key to his mobile home, in order to gather clues and background details. When he arrives at the mobile home, he is astonished to discover Rosie on the bed, seemingly unharmed. He calls the police, takes pictures for his paper, and dashes off to his office, leaving Rosie with the neighbours. Josh doesn't see Kyle who, upon arriving at the mobile home in his white van, is arrested by the police.

Tanya has left to live with Barbara and John and expresses her feelings of guilt to John. She tells him that she didn't want to visit Vic because his room smelt. Tanya feels that Leanne's disappearance would've never happened if she'd joined them. John tries to reassure her. Eventually, Tanya goes to visit her dad in France.

Sarah is finding it hard to let go of Leanne's family and starts seeing them regularly. Sarah is infatuated with Matt, but he rebuffs her advances, telling her that they can only be friends. She is upset at this and eventually reveals own traumatic past to him, in which her father murdered her mother when she was 5 years old. This seems to explain her rather unbalanced behaviour since finding Ethan.

The police have a lead that Leanne may have started seeing her ex- husband, but they haven't followed it up. DCI Iain Barclay is obsessed with following the flower seller, a Bosnian, who may have links with illegal immigration from Macedonia. This frustrates the rest of the team.

After 28 days, DCI Barclay comes under scrutiny from his superiors in the Met as he has no leads on the case at all. They are about to submit a report and are asking the team questions. His colleague Amy is frustrated that he hasn't named a suspect. She accuses him of refusing to name Matt as a suspect because he's black. However, Barclay's superiors ordered him to lay off Matt. Barclay denies this. Later, a body is found in the woods by the dog shelter owner whilst out walking his dogs. The body is identified as Branko, the Macedonian illegal immigrant who sold flowers from a van, the same van Leanne was buying flowers from when she disappeared. Tanya returns from France, along with her father, Barry. Leanne's parents, John and Barbara, are at the terminal to meet Tanya and, upon seeing Barry, John initiates a physical confrontation and is quickly restrained by a security officer.

On day 33, it is August Bank Holiday. Defne is taking part in the fun run; Beam is there to support her. Josh is there to cover the event for the paper. PC Simone Farnes, Sarah and Matt take the children to the fun run. Matt becomes overwhelmed by the crowds and he and Sarah go to her flat, leaving the children and the dog with Simone. They have sex, despite Matt's reluctance. Suddenly a boater on the lake spots a body in the water. After several days it is confirmed that the body is Leanne's.

DS Amy Foster is about to retire, and her colleagues throw a party for her. She drunkenly gives a speech about not missing her colleagues when truly, she is terrified at the prospect of life without her work. Barclay takes her home and sobers her up. Before she retires, the forensic lab does her one last favour, they identify the fibres under Leanne's fingernails as carpet. It becomes apparent to Barclay that Leanne, desperate to give a clue to her would be rescuers, deliberately scraped up the fibres so that they would be found. It was also established that she was alive when she was dumped in the lake. John is admitted to a psychiatric hospital, following an overdose. Barclay had warned him about seeing Leanne's body after 5 weeks underwater, and he's traumatised. Only Tanya comes to visit him, her true feelings for her grandfather shows, mirroring her mum's devotion to Vic, despite her protestations of "who needs love, anyway?" Barbara is furious at John, and refuses to see him. Beam is irritated by the dog shelter man, who insists on confessing to killing Leanne.

Kyle is in court, he is remanded in custody despite his pleas that he was regularly beaten by other inmates in prison. The judge refuses to remand him to his mother. Kyle manages to escape from the police van that was taking him back to prison. He's hit by a car, but continues on his way, eventually ending up at Rosie and Ethan's house, where they're being cared for by Sarah. Rosie is delighted to see him, and gives him a hug. He disappears before Sarah comes out and finds the children.

Gary finds Kyle at the gym and beats him viciously, telling him to be quiet. Matt tells the others to call the police, and then locks himself in the locker room with Kyle and Gary, where he demands to know if Kyle hurt Rosie. Kyle insists that he didn't, and says that it was all an accident. He and Branko ran a smuggling scheme bringing in untaxed cigarettes, and storing them at Vic's mobile home. Vic had let them use it as a favour for Hazel, Kyle's mother, who worked at the nursing home and was the only person who was kind to Vic. When Leanne stopped to buy the flowers, Kyle was in the back of the flower van with cigarettes and illegal cash, Leanne then started to shout at Branko that his cancer sticks were killing her grandfather. Branko attempted to shut her up, and Leanne hit her head, and fell unconscious. Terrified, Branko and Kyle threw her in the back of the van and drove off. When she recovered consciousness, she was concerned about her children, so Kyle went to pick them up in his white van. Ethan and the dog jumped out, but he took Rosie back to Vic's mobile home, where Branko had taken Leanne. Kyle insists that it was too late, and Leanne died, so he took her body and put it in the lake.

Matt tells him that it wasn't too late, that Leanne drowned when Kyle dumped her in the lake. Kyle is horrified and turns to Gary and shouts "You said she was dead!" Matt understands that it was Gary who killed Leanne, and attacks him. The police break in and take them all away, but Kyle dies of his injuries inflicted by Gary. Gary is charged with the deaths of Leanne, Branko and Kyle. The final scene is Matt with his three children at Leanne's grave (with a smaller cross for her unborn baby). Sarah is nearby, but doesn't join the family as they walk away together.

=== Cast ===
- David Oyelowo - Matt Wellings
- Penelope Wilton - Barbara Poole
- Hugh Bonneville - DSI Iain Barclay
- Edward Woodward - Vic Marsham
- Sarah Smart - Sarah Wheeler
- Janet McTeer - DS Amy Foster
- Patrick Malahide - John Poole
- Nikki Amuka-Bird - PC Simone Farnes
- Doug Allen - Gary Machin
- Michelle Bonnard - Defne Topcu
- Rory Kinnear - Kyle Betts
- Margot Leicester - Hazel Betts
- Lucinda Dryzek - Tanya Wellings
- Lee Massey - Ethan Wellings
- Tyler Anthony - Rosie Wellings
- Al Weaver - Josh Fairley
- Phil Davis - Mic Danes
- Richard Harrington - Daf Parry
- Christine Tremarco - Leanne Wellings
- Harriet Walter - ACC Jennie Griffin
- Charlie Creed-Miles - DC Stephen Beam
- San Shella - DC Nawaz
- Jason Watkins - Francis Cross

== Hunter ==
In October 2008, the BBC commissioned a two-part spin-off in which Hugh Bonneville and Janet McTeer reprise their roles as Barclay and Foster. Hunter was broadcast in January 2009.

In Australia, the Five Days drama was broadcast over two weeks on 2 and 9 October ABC TV under the title Hunter as a lead-in to the broadcast of this serial, beginning 16 October.

== Series two ==
In August 2009 the Ecclesbourne Valley Railway in Wirksworth, Derbyshire was used to film the second series, entitled 'Five Days II', and starring Suranne Jones, Anne Reid, Bernard Hill, Matthew McNulty, Ashley Walters, David Morrissey, Chris Fountain, Nina Sosanya and Derek Riddell amongst others. The station at Wirksworth was turned into the fictional station of Castlebury in Yorkshire.

Many locations within West Yorkshire and some in North Yorkshire were used for filming: Many scenes were filmed at Wakefield Kirkgate railway station with the main road approaching the station being closed for a period of time whilst a chase was filmed. A now demolished signal box, named 'Oakenshaw', which was located just down the line from Wakefield Kirkgate gets a mention within the programme. The public entrance and 6th floor interior (with genuine landscape views of Wakefield) of the HM Revenue & Customs Enquiry Centre, 'Crown House' on Kirkgate / Brunswick Street was turned into a police station for filming. Actors wearing high-vis police jackets with 'British Transport Police' on the back were seen outside Crown House. A sign stating 'North Counties Constabulary' was seen outside Crown House and this is believed to be the name for the fictitious local police force, yet the British Transport Police is mentioned with its correct name. One of the main shopping areas, Kirkgate, was also a location for filming.

Brighouse railway station was also seen in the opening scenes of the first episode with a Northern Rail service seen arriving and then departing the station. Many exterior scenes, including Market and outside street scenes were filmed in Dewsbury and Dewsbury Town Hall was also featured. The exterior shots of 'St. Mary's Hospital' is actually the exterior of the 'EC Stoner' Administration building of the University of Leeds and the Mosque shown is actually the Northern School of Contemporary Dance on Louis Street, Chapeltown. Many of the Victorian housing stock seen on screen are Leeds streets filmed around Harehills. All scenes involving the British Rail Class 101 Diesel Multiple Unit were filmed at the Ecclesbourne Valley Railway in Derbyshire. This type of train is no longer in service - the last serving unit was withdrawn in 2003. Certain scenes were set in Scarborough, due to a particular character being resident in the town. Wirksworth station was dressed up to be 'Castlebury' station and the Class 101 DMU had the fictitious 'Pennine Rail Express' livery applied to the interior and exterior of the train - the colours of which are of a similar style to those of the Northern Rail train livery. Some Northern Rail trains can be seen pulling out of stations and in the backgrounds when not central to the main action within a scene.

The second series was broadcast on BBC One from 1–5 March 2010.

=== Plot ===
On day one, an off duty police officer named Laurie Franklin, is on a train accompanying her mother Jen, who has dementia, to hospital. The train suddenly comes to a halt, and it soon transpires that a young Muslim woman has jumped from a bridge, hitting the train, leaving the train driver, Pat, traumatised. Laurie and conductor Danny take charge until the railway police arrive. Danny gives Jen and Laurie a lift to the hospital, where Jen fits and is admitted overnight. At the hospital, Laurie learns from social worker Colly and foster father Nick that a baby has been abandoned in a toilet and found by cleaner Didi. The baby is named Michael, after Didi's brother. As Danny and his Muslim wife Nusrat discuss adoption, Laurie believes that the baby and the suicide are connected. DI Mal Craig, the Railway Police inspector, tells her that the corpse is in fact that of a young man, not a woman as had been previously thought.

Day two, Laurie discovers that Michael's blood group is Asian and although it is believed that the dead youth is the father, Michael's blood group does not match the deceased. However, the dead youth's finger-prints are found on the baby's pushchair, which Colly and Didi discover abandoned in the hospital grounds. It also contains a Muslim prayer for protection. Mal's son, Luke, who lives with his estranged wife, was playing by the railway lines, and recorded a video of his friend, and in the background, the video shows that the dead youth was actually pushed, at which point Laurie's superior, Supt Jim Carpenter, takes over the case. DC Bilal Choudry answers an appeal and names the corpse as an illegal Afghan immigrant, Farid, who was a drug-pusher, possibly killed in a gangland revenge. Laurie is surprised to find Jen bringing home Gerard, a man they met on the train. Nusrat - hopeful to adopt Michael - discovers her brother Khalil agitated and blood-stained.

Day 8, Michael falls ill, and is admitted to hospital. The diagnosis is suspected methadone withdrawal. There are no leads a week after the murder. A reconstruction of the murder is created and Muslim passenger Jamal Matthews accuses Laurie of inciting Islamophobia. An old lady alerts Laurie to the disappearance of her neighbours on the day of the murder - a man and two women. Farid's shoe is found in their car but was apparently also worn by someone else. Nusrat disowns Khalil to the adoption officer and soon afterwards their father, Ibra, finds images of Khalil with a Taliban-type group on his computer following Khalil's visit to Pakistan, allegedly to study. At the same time Khalil is meeting Jamal.

Day 37, Nick takes Michael home and confesses to Colly, his deceased wife's sister, that he wants to keep him, but Didi tells Colly a child needs a mother and Nusrat and Danny are suitable for the adoption. Khalil has a panic attack at a royal visit and is briefly arrested by Laurie, which angers Ibra. Ibra confronts Khalil about the photos found on the computer, to which Khalil replies that they were from the past and that he has changed. Pat meets former lover Maureen who reveals that she lived next to the old lady with her friend's daughter Katie, who now lives in Manchester. It transpires that Katie is Michael's mother, and the father is Farid, but it is revealed that Farid wasn't the dead youth's name. Farid is in fact, the dead youth's brother, who turns up. Jen and Gerry bond as he goes with her to hospital, where her condition is re-diagnosed as physical degeneration and not Alzheimer's. Laurie and Mal also bond but as Pat takes Maureen to the police to explain her innocence, Mal is hit by a car whilst pursuing Sohel, one of the train passengers.

Two months later, Laurie, still traumatised from the accident that killed Mal, learns that Jen and Gerry are engaged. Maureen, having told the police that she was on the bridge when the youth jumped but did not push him, moves in with Pat. Farid, Michael's real father, is preparing to collect Michael from Nick and promises to raise him with the aid of Maureen. However Maureen kidnaps Michael and takes him to Katie, who wants nothing to do with Michael. She returns to Pat, confessing that she shopped Farid for drug-dealing, causing his brother to jump from the bridge as he was left on his own. Laurie discovers that Pat has pushed Maureen over the bridge, because she twice deserted him. Laurie fears that Michael has been killed too, but finds him safe in the car, and Laurie arrests Pat. Khalil is imprisoned on suspicion of terrorism for having been at the camp in Pakistan and Nusrat and Danny fear this will harm their adoption chances forever.

=== Cast ===
- Suranne Jones - Laurie Franklin
- David Morrissey - DI Mal Craig
- Bernard Hill - Gerard Hopkirk
- Anne Reid - Jen Mason
- Hugo Speer - Supt Jim Carpenter
- Shaun Dooley - Sgt Don Parker
- Navin Chowdhry - Bilal Choudry
- Derek Riddell - Nick Durden
- Nina Sosanya - Colly Trent
- Shivani Ghai - Nusrat Preston
- Matthew McNulty - Danny Preston
- Sacha Dhawan - Khalil Akram
- Pooky Quesnel - Maureen Hardy
- Steve Evets - Pat Dowling
- Ashley Walters - Jamal Matthews
- Aaron Neil - Ibra Akram
- Luke Hudson - Luke Craig
- Samantha Robinson - PC Natalie Cryer
