= The Safe Side =

The Safe Side is a series of children's safety videos and related products created in 2005 by Julie Clark, creator and founder of The Baby Einstein Company, and John Walsh, host of America's Most Wanted and co-founder of the National Center for Missing and Exploited Children. The DVDs and accompanying materials present safety guidance for children through entertainment-focused formats. In 2006, a NetSmartz-branded DVD and CD on internet safety was released, along with badge stickers, wristbands, identification kits, and school event kits as part of the National Center for Missing & Exploited Children’s NetSmartz educational program.

== Videos ==
Safe Side Superchick, portrayed by Angela Shelton, appears as the center character in both productions:

- The Safe Side: Stranger Safety (2005), which teaches 'Hot Tips' about staying safe around strangers, and included a music video and three Safety Badges.
- The Safe Side: Internet Safety (2006), which introduces online-safety guidance and features two music videos, bloopers, and a Safe Side wristband.

== Music ==
The Safe Side Cool Tunes (2006) is a compilation of ten safety-themed songs, including Safe Side Close.

== Books ==
The only book in the series, Keep Close. Keep Cool., was released as a companion to the video materials.
