= The Mystery of Edwin Drood (TV series) =

2012 British television miniseries

- US DVD cover
- Based on: The Mystery of Edwin Drood by Charles Dickens
- Screenplay by: Gwyneth Hughes
- Directed by: Diarmuid Lawrence
- Starring: Matthew Rhys; Rory Kinnear
- Theme music composer: John Lunn
- Country of origin: United Kingdom
- Original language: English

Production
- Producer: Lisa Osborne
- Cinematography: Alan Almond
- Editor: David Head
- Running time: 120 minutes or 2 x 60 minutes

Original release
- Network: BBC2
- Release: 10 January – 11 January 2012

The Mystery of Edwin Drood is a 2012 British television adaptation of the unfinished 1870 novel by Charles Dickens, adapted with a new ending by Gwyneth Hughes, produced by Lisa Osborne, and directed by Diarmuid Lawrence. It was aired in the United Kingdom on BBC2 as two one-hour parts on 10 and 11 January 2012, in the United States as a single two-hour film on PBS on 15 April 2012, and in Australia on ABC1 on 2 January 2013.

== Plot ==
The film begins with John Jasper, choirmaster of Cloisterham Cathedral, in an opium den, hallucinating about strangling his nephew, Edwin Drood, in full view of his fiancée, Rosa Bud. Edwin Drood later visits Cloisterham, initially to see Rosa, before going off to his uncle's house. His arrival at the Nuns' House, the boarding school where Rosa lives, is met with much excitement by the other occupants, while Rosa appears indifferent at best. It is soon apparent that theirs is an odd relationship and Rosa shows little passion for it, something Edwin communicates to his uncle after the visit. In the same scene, the attraction Jasper seems to have for Rosa, as indicated in his earlier hallucination, is buttressed by a drawing of her enjoying pride of place on his wall, which Edwin believes he has kept because he (Edwin) was the artist.

A second arrival to Cloisterham follows Edwin's, as Neville Landless and his twin sister Helena arrive from Ceylon, Neville to study with one of the minor canons, Reverend Crisparkle, and Helena will live at the Nuns' House with Rosa. Failing to engage them in conversation, Reverend Crisparkle and his mother invite Edwin and Rosa to meet them. While Jasper plays on the piano and Rosa sings along, his desire for her becomes more obvious, and is immediately noticed by Helena. At the same event, Neville becomes attracted to Rosa and takes an immediate dislike to Edwin, and Helena and Rosa strike up a friendship, after the singing exercise leaves the latter unsettled. Back at the Nuns' House, Helena makes her suspicions known to Rosa, who confides to her that she loathes and fears her music-master, Jasper.

Neville and Edwin, meanwhile, have a brief scrap, and Edwin later provokes him into reacting violently, which Jasper reports to others, giving birth to Neville's reputation of having a violent temper. Meanwhile, having an interest in the cathedral crypt, Jasper seeks the company of Durdles, a man who knows more about the crypt than anyone else. Durdles takes Jasper into the cathedral crypt. Jasper provides a bottle of wine to Durdles. The wine is mysteriously potent and Durdles soon loses consciousness.

Rosa, convinced she does not love Edwin, visits her guardian, Mr Grewgious. When she asks whether there would be any forfeiture to her inheritance if she does not marry Edwin, he replies that there would be none on either side. Mr Grewgious gives Edwin a ring which Rosa's father had given to her mother, with the proviso that Edwin must either give the ring to Rosa as a sign of his irrevocable commitment to her or return it to him. The next day, Rosa and Edwin amicably agree to end their betrothal. Unfortunately, Jasper, who had been given information by Mr Grewgious to indicate that the betrothal might not go through, sees his delight crushed by a misreading of their conversation, mistaking the amicable parting for a confirmation of shared affection.

Reeling from his anger, he arranges a reconciliation dinner between Edwin and Neville, which proves successful. Drood and Neville leave together to go down to the cathedral, where they learn they have more in common than was previously thought. Neville is seen to depart, but the next morning Edwin is missing and Jasper spreads suspicion that Neville has killed him. Neville leaves early in the morning for a hike, but the townspeople overtake him and bring him back to the city. Mr Grewgious keeps Neville out of jail by taking responsibility for him: he will produce him any time his presence is required. Meanwhile, Deputy, Durdles' little helper, finds the ring discarded on the graveyard floor.

While defending Neville's innocence against Jasper's accusations, the twins confess that they did not come to Cloisterham to further their education but to find their father, the late Edwin Drood Sr. As Edwin Jr was their brother, they argued, Neville had no cause to murder him. Jasper refutes their claims, but Mr Grewgious begins to look into it, assisted by Neville and Grewgious's clerk, Bazzard.

In dream sequences it is shown that Jasper is responsible for killing Edwin, though no one is certain what he has done with the body. He visits Rosa at the Nuns' House and professes his love for her. She rejects him but he persists; he says that he will never give up on her until he is dead. In fear of Jasper, Rosa goes to Mr Grewgious in London. Jasper is informed of Rosa's disappearance and follows her, but Neville and Helena prevent him from taking her with him. As he departs, Mr Grewgious informs him that Edwin and Rosa had ended their betrothal, meaning he has murdered his nephew for no reason.

Bazzard, calling himself Dick Datchery, arrives in Cloisterham. His investigations show no evidence of Edwin Drood Sr's death, so he extends his search. He asks directions from Deputy, who will not go near Jasper for fear that he will choke him again, the choirmaster having threatened to kill him earlier. At the same time, Reverend Crisparkle is given a letter which seems to confirm Helena's assertion that Jasper is obsessed with Rosa, and he stumbles upon Bazzard and Deputy, who have broken into Jasper's flat. All three begin to work together to solve the mystery of Drood Jr's disappearance and enlist the help of Durdles to search the tombs for his body.

Believing also that Jasper killed Edwin, Rosa promises to leave with him if he will show her where he placed Edwin's body. He takes her to the Cathedral, where they overhear the investigative quartet down below. Rosa escapes from his clutches only to bump into Edwin, who informs her that he simply left for Egypt, where his father had a business, and discarded the ring in anger after she called their betrothal off. At the same time Jasper stumbles upon Reverend Crisparkle, Durdles, Bazzard and Deputy, who have located a recently deceased body in the Drood tomb. Jasper confirms that it is Drood Sr, who he states was his father and not his brother-in-law as previously believed, and confesses to killing him a year earlier when he showed up suddenly to look for Edwin. Edwin himself appears and Jasper, thinking him a ghost, takes his own life.

In the aftermath, Edwin accepts the twins as his siblings and Neville's offer to go into business with him. A romance having been budding for the duration of the story, Helena accepts Reverend Crisparkle's unspoken proposal.

== Cast ==
In credits order.

- Matthew Rhys as John Jasper
- Rory Kinnear as Reverend Septimus Crisparkle
- Alun Armstrong as Hiram Grewgious
- Julia McKenzie as Mrs Crisparkle
- Ron Cook as Durdles
- David Dawson as Bazzard
- Sacha Dhawan as Neville Landless
- Freddie Fox as Edwin Drood
- Ian McNeice as Mayor Thomas Sapsea
- Tamzin Merchant as Rosa Bud
- Amber Rose Revah as Helena Landless
- Ellie Haddington as Princess Puffer
- Janet Dale as Miss Twinkleton
- Alfie Davis as Deputy
- Rob Dixon as Captain Drood

== Earlier ITV version ==
Although the 2012 miniseries is the first (and, so far, only) BBC television adaptation, ITV previously adapted Edwin Drood into eight thirty-minute episodes, broadcast live in weekly parts at 8:00pm from 28 September to 16 November 1960, airing concurrently with the BBC's adaptation of Barnaby Rudge. Written by John Keir Cross, it starred Donald Sinden as John Jasper, Richard Pearson as Mr Crisparkle, Tim Seely as Edwin Drood, and Barbara Brown as Rosa Bud; with each episode featuring an introduction by actor Michael Ingrams. This serial is believed to have been lost during the archival purges in the 1960s and 70s, and virtually nothing else is known about it beyond the rest of the cast and the episode titles. Photographs taken from contemporary newspaper listings (which speak positively of the production) exist within the BFI's library, but are not available to the public. Seely is credited for the final episode, suggesting it may have shared the same twist ending as the 2012 version.

== Earlier radio version ==
In 1965, for Radio 4's long-running "Saturday Night Theatre" strand, Mollie Hardwick adapted the story into a 90-minute radio play and suggested an ending. The cast included Francis de Wolff as the Narrator, John Gabriel as John Jasper, Mary Wimbush as Princess Puffer, Patrick Barr as Crisparkle, Malcolm Terris as Edwin Drood, Rosalind Shanks as Rosa, Nigel Graham as Neville Landless, Isabel Rennie as Helena Landless and Denys Blakelock as Mr. Grewgious. It was repeated on 4 October 1970. It is available on the internet, although it is unclear whether it has been sourced from an archive, or is an off-air recording.

== Differences from Dickens' unfinished novel ==
In the book, Jasper threatens Deputy because he believes he was spying on him. In the film, he does so because Deputy pelted him with pebbles.

Mr Tartar does not appear in the film, and it is Bazzard who pretends to be Dick Datchery.

It has an original ending—the unfinished novel ends when the opium den proprietor and Datchery turn up in Cloisterham.

== Filming locations ==
Much of the filming was done in Rochester, Kent. Rochester Cathedral and its grounds feature extensively in the series. In particular, the exterior of Jasper's Gatehouse was filmed at the Cathedral Gate in Minor Canon Row, and Jasper's Gatehouse interior was filmed at Eastgate House in Rochester High Street.

The scenes in the marshes were also shot in Kent, at Riverside Country Park in Gillingham.

== DVD release ==
The film was released on DVD and Blu-ray in the United States on 1 May 2012. It was released on DVD in the UK in November 2017.
