= The King Is Alive =

2000 film by Kristian Levring

- Directed by: Kristian Levring
- Written by: Kristian Levring; Anders Thomas Jensen
- Produced by: Vibeke Windeløv
- Starring: Miles Anderson; Romane Bohringer; David Bradley; David Calder; Jennifer Jason Leigh; Brion James
- Cinematography: Jens Schlosser
- Edited by: Nicholas Wayman Harris
- Music by: Jan Juhler
- Distributed by: Nordisk Film Distribution A/S
- Release dates: May 2000 (Cannes); 5 January 2001
- Running time: 109 minutes
- Country: Denmark
- Language: English

The King Is Alive is a 2000 English-language Danish drama film directed by Kristian Levring, and starring Jennifer Jason Leigh, Bruce Davison, David Bradley, Janet McTeer, David Calder, and Brion James in his final feature film appearance. The fourth film to be done according to the Dogme 95 rules, it was screened in the Un Certain Regard section at the 2000 Cannes Film Festival.

== Plot ==
A group of tourists are stranded in the Namibian desert when their bus loses its way and runs out of fuel. Canned carrots and dew keep the tourists alive, but they are helplessly entrapped, completely cut off from the rest of the world. As courage and moral fibre weaken and relationships grow shaky, Henry, a theatrical manager, persuades the group to put on Shakespeare's tragedy King Lear. As the tourists work their way through Henry's hand-written scripts for an audience of only the sand dunes and one distant, indigenous watcher, real life increasingly begins to resemble the play.

== Cast ==
- Miles Anderson as Jack
- Romane Bohringer as Catherine
- David Bradley as Henry
- David Calder as Charles
- Bruce Davison as Ray
- Brion James as Ashley
- Peter Khubeke as Kanana (as Peter Kubheka)
- Vusi Kunene as Moses
- Jennifer Jason Leigh as Gina
- Janet McTeer as Liz
- Chris Walker as Paul
- Lia Williams as Amanda

== Reception ==
On review aggregator Rotten Tomatoes, The King Is Alive holds an approval rating of 60%, based on 68 reviews, and an average rating of 6/10. Its consensus reads, "Though the plot feels rather contrived, the ensemble acting in this Dogme 95 film is good." On Metacritic, the film has a weighted average score of 52 out of 100, based on 25 critics, indicating "Mixed or average reviews".
