= Hunter (British TV serial) =

- Genre: Crime drama
- Created by: Gwyneth Hughes
- Written by: Mick Ford; Gwyneth Hughes
- Directed by: Colm McCarthy
- Starring: Hugh Bonneville; Janet McTeer; Nathan Constance; Anna Koval; Eleanor Matsuura; Jonathan Slinger; Geoffrey Streatfeild; Harriet Walter
- Composer: Ben Bartlett
- Country of origin: United Kingdom
- Original language: English
- No. of series: 1
- No. of episodes: 2

Production
- Executive producers: Jessica Pope; Simon Curtis
- Producer: Emma Benson
- Cinematography: Damian Bromley
- Running time: 60 minutes
- Production company: BBC Studios

Original release
- Network: BBC One, BBC HD
- Release: 18 January – 19 January 2009

Hunter is a two-part BBC One police crime drama, commissioned in 2008 as a follow-up to Five Days, the 2007 series which introduced the protagonists of Hunter – DSI Iain Barclay (Hugh Bonneville) and DS Amy Foster (Janet McTeer) – who reprise their roles as the dysfunctional detective pair. The two-part drama aired on Sunday 18 and Monday 19 January 2009 on BBC One, and achieved an average of 5.4 million viewers during first episode. The drama was also simulcast on BBC HD. The drama was intended as a backdoor pilot for a potential series, but no further episodes were commissioned.

== Plot ==
DSI Iain Barclay heads up a team of police officers that are looking into the disappearance of two boys. He calls in the assistance of former colleague DS Amy Foster to help with the investigation. The perpetrators turn out to be radical members of the anti-abortion movement, who threaten to kill the two children unless the BBC screens an anti-abortion propaganda film. Barclay, Foster and their colleagues must race against time to apprehend the kidnappers before they can carry out their threats.

== Cast ==
- DSI Iain Barclay — Hugh Bonneville
- DI Zoe Larson — Eleanor Matsuura
- DS Amy Foster — Janet McTeer
- DS Nick Dyer — Geoffrey Streatfeild
- DC Sue Mailer — Anna Koval
- DC Connor — Nathan Constance
- DC Miles — Jonathan Slinger
- DS Jim MacAulay — Tim Woodward
- ACC Jenny Griffin — Harriet Walter
- Dr. Margaret Newell — Clare Holman
- John Elder — Adrian Rawlins
- Peter Richards — Joe Tucker
- Phillippa Richards — Sarah Ball
- Jan Speddings — Sophie Stanton
- Hannah Crowley — Frances Albery

== Home media ==
On 15 October 2009, the drama was released on Region 4 DVD in Australia via Roadshow Entertainment.
