= Angela Shelton =

American actress, producer (b. 1972)

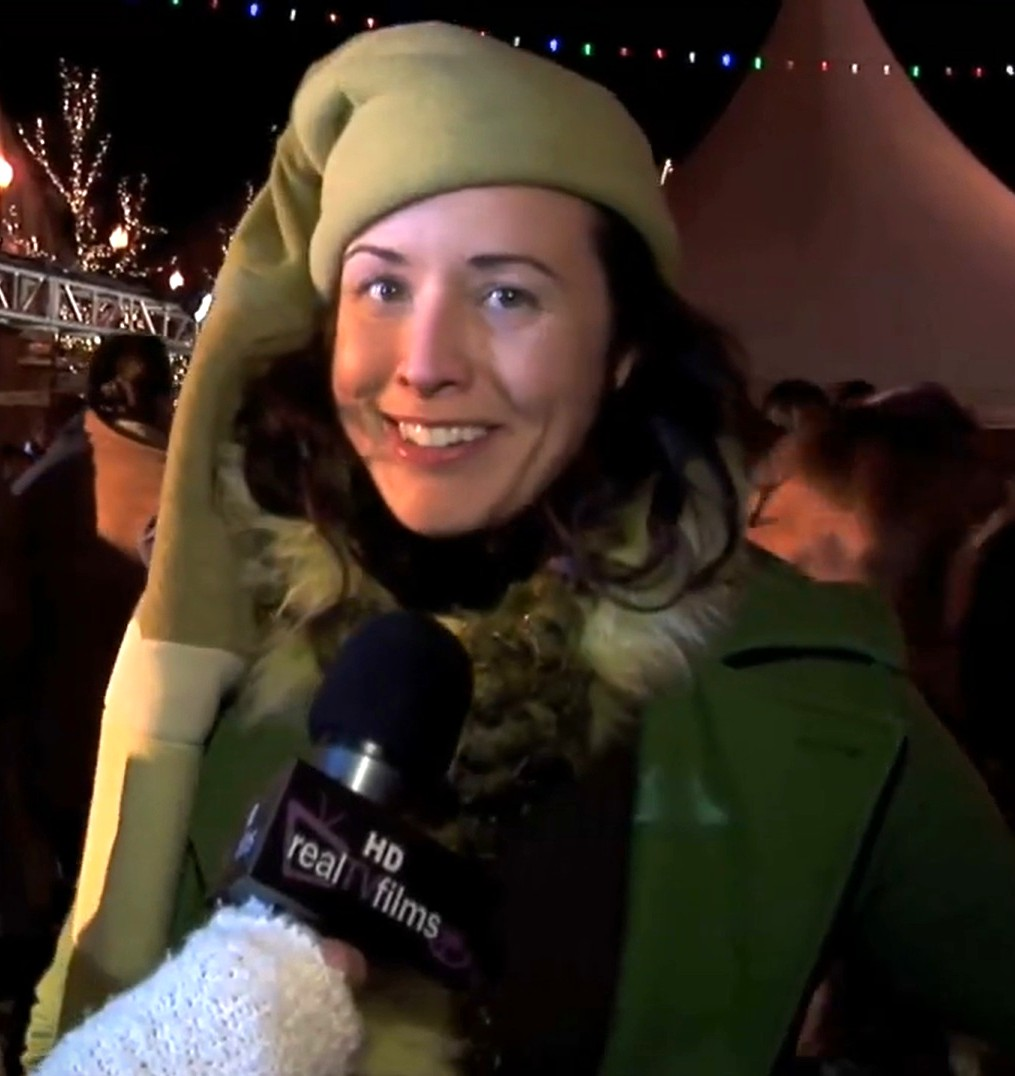
- Shelton in 2009
- Born: December 5, 1972 (age 53); Asheville, North Carolina, United States
- Occupations: Screenwriter, actress, producer
- Spouses: Gavin O'Connor (m. 1995; div. 1996) Abe Ingersoll (divorced) Karl Aurel Kail (m. 2012)
- Children: 1

Angela Shelton (born December 5, 1972) is an American screenwriter, actress, and documentary film director and producer, best known for the film Tumbleweeds (1999) and the documentary Searching for Angela Shelton (2004), which she wrote, directed, and edited. She is the author of the 2008 book Finding Angela Shelton: The True Story of One Woman's Triumph over Sexual Abuse.

== Early life ==
After her parents divorced, Shelton lived with her father, stepmother, stepbrother, and stepsister in North Carolina. She and her siblings were sexually molested by her father and stepmother, and were eventually removed from their care and placed in foster care.

== Early career ==
Shelton was a co-screenwriter, with then-husband Gavin O'Connor, and executive producer for the 1999 film Tumbleweeds, based on her experiences with her serial-marrying mother, to whom she was returned after being in foster care.

She appeared in the films Comfortably Numb (1995), The Shrink Is In (2001) and Beautiful Dreamer (a.k.a. Daysleeper) (2009). On television, Shelton has appeared in episodes of Pacific Blue, Chicago Hope and Becker, and the TV movie The Big Time (2002).

== Other films and projects ==
The feature film, The Hammer (2018) (a.k.a. Heart, Baby), was written, produced and directed by Shelton and stars Gbenga Akinnagbe, based on the true story of George "The Hammer" Martin, a prison boxer who was offered freedom to fight in the 1984 Olympics and refused to go.

In The Eagle and the Albatross (2020), Shelton used her own experiences with her mentors in a comedy drama about an orphaned half-Korean girl, played by Amber Liu, who seeks help from a widowed optometrist, Dan Lauria, with the only thing both of them love - golf. The only problem is, he only has three months to live.

The events in her childhood inspired her to make a documentary, Searching for Angela Shelton (2004). In 2001, she rented a motor home and travelled the United States in an effort to interview 76 women who shared her name, succeeding in talking to 40 of them. She found that many of the women whom she interviewed had either been raped, beaten, or molested. Shelton also confronted her father, her own abuser, during the production of the film, meeting with him to discuss her molestation. It took three years to complete the film. She distributed the film independently, and appeared in 2004 on the American television programs 48 Hours and The Oprah Winfrey Show. In April 2006, an edited version of the film aired on the cable television channel Lifetime, as part of their campaign to end violence against women.

In October 2013, she shared her story, "Use Your Sword," as part of the first [That's What She Said] show, held at the Krannert Center for the Performing Arts in Urbana, Illinois.

== Anti-abuse advocacy ==
In response to the attention received by the work she was doing to create her documentary, Searching for Angela Shelton, Shelton established the Angela Shelton Foundation in 2003. Though the Angela Shelton Foundation has since been dissolved and is no longer active, Shelton donated the foundation's assets to the Darkness to Light organization.

The foundation and her release of Searching for Angela Shelton inspired Shelton to present the film and gives speeches at colleges and universities, in an effort to end violence against women.

In October 2013, Shelton shared her story, "Use Your Sword," as part of the first That's What She Said show, held at the Krannert Center for the Performing Arts.

Shelton created the Survivor Manual as a way to help abuse survivors and their loved ones find healing.

== Author ==
In April 2007, Shelton released her book, Finding Angela Shelton: The True Story of One Woman's Triumph over Sexual Abuse. The book shares how making the film forced her to face her past. She wrote the book to call for a healing revolution after seeing so many people in pain.

In 2009, Shelton released a revised second edition called Finding Angela Shelton Recovered, with an additional chapter explaining all that happened since she made her film.

== Awards ==
Shelton won a regional Emmy for her appearance as Safe Side Superchick in the Safe Side series, created by John Walsh and Baby Einstein's Julie Clark.

Her 2004 documentary film, Searching for Angela Shelton, won a number of awards, including:

- Newport Beach Festival - Best Independent Documentary
- Durango Film Festival - Audience Award
- Asheville Film Festival - Best Documentary
- Sonoma Valley Film Festival - Audience Award
- Zoie Fest - Best Documentary
- Memphis International Film Festival - Best Documentary
- Austin Film Festival - Best Documentary
- Voice of Courage award from Darkness to Light
- Humanitarian Award from the Cultural Enrichment Committee at Umpqua Community College in Oregon.

The mayor of Asheville, North Carolina proclaimed April 29, 2005 Angela Shelton Day.
