= Ashley Buccille =

American film and television actress

- Born: January 30, 1986 (age 40)
- Occupation: Actress
- Years active: 1994–2003

Ashley Buccille (/ˌbʌˈtʃiːl/ buh-CHEEL) (born January 30, 1986) is an American film and television actress. She is best known for her roles in the films Phenomenon (1996) and Tumbleweeds (1999). From 1997 to 2003, she provided the voice of Lila Sawyer on the Nickelodeon animated series Hey Arnold!.

== Filmography ==
=== Films ===
Year	Title	Role	Notes
1994	The Haunting of Seacliff Inn		TV film
1996	Phenomenon	Glory Pennamin	
1997	Dusting Cliff 7	Carrie Bishop	
1999	Deal of a Lifetime	Ramona	
1999	Tumbleweeds	Zoe Brussard	

=== Television series ===
Year	Title	Role	Notes
1996	Renegade	Molly	
1997	Baywatch Nights	Katie Burton	
1998	Unhappily Ever After	Girl #2	
1999	Sons of Thunder	Danielle Kolshak	
1997–2003	Hey Arnold!	Lila Sawyer/Lulu	

== Awards ==
Year	Award	Category	For	Result
1997	Young Artist Award	Best Performance in a feature film (actress age 10 or under)	Phenomenon	Nominated
