= Cinema Audio Society Awards 2009 =

Annual US film and television awards ceremony

46th CAS Awards

February 27, 2010

Theatrical Releases:
The Hurt Locker

The 46th Cinema Audio Society Awards, which were held on February 27, 2010, honored the outstanding achievements in sound mixing in film and television of 2009.

== Winners and nominees ==
=== Film ===
- The Hurt Locker — Ray Beckett and Paul N. J. Ottosson
  - Avatar — Tony Johnson, Christopher Boyes, Gary Summers, and Andy Nelson
  - District 9 — Ken Saville, Michael Hedges, and Gilbert Lake
  - Star Trek — Peter J. Devlin, Paul Massey, Andy Nelson, and Anna Behlmer
  - Transformers: Revenge of the Fallen — Peter J. Devlin, Paul Massey, Andy Nelson, and Anna Behlmer

=== Television ===
==== Series ====
- Mad Men (Episode: "Guy Walks Into an Advertising Agency")
  - 24 (Episode: "10:00 p.m. – 11:00 p.m.")
  - Battlestar Galactica (Episode: "Daybreak", Part 2)
  - Desperate Housewives (Episode: "Boom Crunch")
  - Glee (Episode: "Wheels")

==== Miniseries or Television Film ====
- Grey Gardens
  - Endgame
  - House (Episode: "Broken")
  - Into the Storm
  - Taking Chance
