= Gwyneth Hughes =

British journalist and filmmaker

Gwyneth Hughes is a British documentary director and screenwriter who works mainly in television.

== Career ==
She is a former newspaper journalist from the north of England.

Her credits include the crime drama Five Days, Cherished, a film about the wrongful conviction of Angela Cannings, an adaptation of Charles Dickens's unfinished work The Mystery of Edwin Drood, and The Girl, which explores an alleged obsession Alfred Hitchcock had with the actress Tippi Hedren. Her work on Five Days earned her a nomination at the 2008 Golden Globe Awards. In 2013, she wrote Remember Me, a television drama serial that debuted on the BBC in November 2014.

In 2018, Hughes executive-produced and adapted William Makepeace Thackeray's novel Vanity Fair into a seven-part television mini-series for ITV and Amazon Studios. Hughes wrote the true crime miniseries Honour in 2020, for ITV, Hughes adapted Henry Fielding's novel Tom Jones into a miniseries broadcast on PBS in 2023.

In January 2024, ITV broadcast Mr Bates vs The Post Office, Hughes' four-part series about the British Post Office scandal, a miscarriage of justice in which hundreds of sub-postmasters were wrongly prosecuted.

The Writers’ Guild of Great Britain awarded its highest Awards accolade, the Outstanding Contribution to Writing Award, to Hughes in January 2025. She was elected a Fellow of the Royal Society of Literature (FRSL) in 2025.

== Television ==
Year	Title	Writer	Executive Producer	Creator	Notes
1996–1997	The Bill	Yes	No	No	3 episodes
1997	Dangerfield	Yes	No	No	1 episode
1998	Silent Witness	Yes	No	No	2 episodes
2000	The Mrs Bradley Mysteries	Yes	No	No	1 episode
2000	Sleeper	Yes	No	Yes	
2002	Blood Strangers	Yes	No	Yes	
2003	Peter in Paradise	Yes	No	Yes	TV Movie
2005	Cherished	Yes	No	Yes	TV Movie
2005	Beneath the Skin	Yes	No	Yes	TV Movie
2006	Mysterious Creatures	Yes	No	Yes	TV Movie
2007	Miss Austen Regrets	Yes	No	Yes	TV Movie
2009	Hunter	No	No	Yes	
2009	U Be Dead	Yes	Yes	Yes	TV Movie
2007-2010	Five Days	Yes	No	Yes	
2012	The Mystery of Edwin Drood	Yes	No	Yes	
2012	The Girl	Yes	No	Yes	TV Movie
2013	Talking to the Dead	Yes	No	Yes	
2013	Remember Me	Yes	Yes	Yes	
2016	Dark Angel	Yes	Yes	Yes	
2018	Vanity Fair	Yes	Yes	Yes	
2018	Doing Money	Yes	No	Yes	TV Movie
2020	Honour	Yes	Yes	Yes	
2021	Three Families	Yes	Yes	Yes	
2023	Tom Jones	Yes	Yes	Yes	
2024	Mr Bates vs The Post Office	Yes	Yes	Yes	
