= Tumbleweeds (1999 film) =

American comedy-drama film by Gavin O'Connor

- Theatrical release poster
- Directed by: Gavin O'Connor
- Written by: Gavin O'Connor; Angela Shelton
- Produced by: Greg O'Connor
- Starring: Janet McTeer; Kimberly J. Brown; Gavin O'Connor; Jay O. Sanders
- Cinematography: Dan Stoloff
- Edited by: John Gilroy
- Music by: David Mansfield
- Distributed by: Fine Line Features
- Release dates: January 24, 1999 (Sundance); November 24, 1999 (limited)
- Running time: 100 minutes
- Country: United States
- Language: English
- Budget: $312,000
- Box office: $1.3 million

Tumbleweeds is a 1999 American comedy-drama film directed by Gavin O'Connor. O'Connor co-wrote the screenplay with his then-wife Angela Shelton, based on Shelton's childhood memories spent on the road with her serial-marrying mother. It stars Janet McTeer, Kimberly J. Brown and Jay O. Sanders.

The film had its world premiere at the Sundance Film Festival, where O'Connor won the Filmmaker Trophy award. McTeer won the Golden Globe Award for Best Actress in a Motion Picture - Musical or Comedy and was nominated for the Academy Award for Best Actress. Brown won the Independent Spirit Award for Best Debut Performance and the Young Artist Award for Best Performance in a Feature Film.

== Plot ==
The story revolves around Mary Jo Walker, a single mother whose usual reaction to trouble is to pack her car with her belongings and take her pre-teen daughter Ava in search of greener pastures. The film commences with a strong-willed Mary Jo in an altercation with a man. As this is something which is routine in Ava's life, she packs a suitcase as she prepares herself for their inevitable departure.

Mother and daughter embark upon a journey. When a reunion with an old beau in Missouri proves to be less successful than anticipated, Mary Jo accedes to Ava's desire to see the Pacific Ocean and heads west. Mary Jo wishes to separate herself from her old life, which is manifested when she and her daughter throw the former's clothing from the car window. En route they are assisted by long-distance trucker Jack Ranson, who coincidentally re-enters their lives after they have settled in San Diego. Once again, Mary Jo forgoes both her independence and daughter's well-being in favor of having a man in her life. She quits her office job. On face value, Ava's life has changed for the better. For example, she makes friends with a girl in her class (although they later part ways when the girl becomes jealous of Ava's acting talents). Ava also secures a starring role as Romeo in the school play, "Romeo and Juliet". Lastly, Ava is ecstatic when she finds a boyfriend, who takes her to watch a movie. Matters, however, become complicated when Jack becomes verbally aggressive towards Mary Jo. Jack exhibits his true personality when he takes Mary Jo and Ava to a fine dinner and becomes infuriated by Ava's attitude. Ava, however, is just excited about the prospect of having a leading role in the play.

When Ava and Mary Jo flee the restaurant, they spend the night in a motel, a scenario with which both mother and daughter are familiar. The next day, Mary Jo is adamant that the two leave town, with only their clothing on their backs. Ava decides to put her foot down and rebel. She tells her mother that she is tired of moving from state to state and is frustrated by her mother's carefree attitude. Although Mary Jo is at first furious at Ava's refusal to cooperate, Mary Jo then realizes that there is the need to make significant changes in their lives. She finally accepts that her behavior has had severe negative repercussions on her daughter.

Toward the end of the movie, Ava and her mother stay at a house that a friend of Mary Jo's has loaned to them. Ava rebuilds her friendship with the same girl in her class. Lastly, both she and her mother start to rebuild their lives together. Mary Jo gets a job at a plant nursery.

== Cast ==
- Janet McTeer as Mary Jo Walker
- Kimberly J. Brown as Ava Walker
- Gavin O'Connor as Jack Ranson
- Jay O. Sanders as Dan Miller
- Laurel Holloman as Laurie Pendleton
- Lois Smith as Ginger
- Michael J. Pollard as Mr. Cummings
- Noah Emmerich as Vertis Dewey
- Cody McMains as Adam Riley
- Sara Downing as Rachel Riley
- Ashley Buccille as Zoe Brussard
- Jennifer Paige as The Nurse

== Production ==
The inspiration for Tumbleweeds came from Angela Shelton's unpublished memoir detailing her travels with her mother, who married and divorced several times during Shelton's upbringing. Gavin O’Connor married Shelton in 1994 and they began to work on a script for a film adaptation shortly after. Though the couple divorced in 1996, they continued work on the script as it went through several drafts.

Janet McTeer was cast as Mary Jo after O'Connor saw the actress on the Charlie Rose show. He and Shelton had a hard time finding support from major film studios, as producers did not think McTeer, a British theatre actress, was a recognizable enough name to headline a picture. Shelton and O'Connor decided to finance the film themselves.

Tumbleweeds was shot on location in the Los Angeles area in October 1998 over a period of 24 days. Locations included Agoura Hills, North Hollywood, Malibu, and the Eagle Rock neighborhood.

The film's soundtrack includes "Private Conversation" by Lyle Lovett, "My Heart Skips a Beat" by Buck Owens, "One of These Days" by Emmylou Harris, "One Night Stand" by Lucinda Williams, and "Sea of Heartbreak" by Johnny Cash.

== Reception ==
=== Release ===
The film premiered at the 1999 Sundance Film Festival, where it won the Dramatic Filmmakers Trophy and secured a distribution deal with Fine Line Features. It was later shown at the Toronto International Film Festival and the Austin Film Festival before opening in Los Angeles and New York City on November 24, 1999.

=== Critical response ===
Tumbleweeds holds a rating of 82% on Rotten Tomatoes based on 68 reviews. The site's consensus states: "Strong performances add authenticity and depth." Metacritic, which uses a weighted average, assigned the film a score of 75 out of 100, based on 34 critics, indicating "generally favorable" reviews.

In his review in The New York Times, Stephen Holden said the film "is a modestly produced slice of Americana. But its central performances are so extraordinarily nuanced and the screenplay so perfectly attuned to the twang and beat of everyday speech that in places the movie feels like a documentary . . . There are many moments when what is on the screen stops looking like acting and becomes life itself, and you're watching real people change and grow before your eyes."

Glenn Lovell of Variety wrote, "Powered by uncommon rapport between its femme leads and helmer's roughhewned sensibility, pic has what it takes to become the year's first heartfelt sleeper . . . [it] has topnotch production values and a strong supporting cast going for it."

In the San Francisco Chronicle, Peter Stack observed, "Tumbleweeds is far from a slick Hollywood-style production. It's not encumbered, for one thing, by star power . . . [and] its lack of stars becomes part of its charm . . . The interplay between Mary Jo and Ava is the film's great treat. They seem utterly natural together, bound by mother-daughter ties that are complex, touching, ultimately so powerful they yield the kind of tearful joy rarely experienced at the movies."

Peter Travers of Rolling Stone wrote, "McTeer and Brown make magic in a film that is wonderfully funny, touching and vital."

== Awards and nominations ==
- Academy Award for Best Actress (Janet McTeer, nominee)
- Golden Globe Award for Best Actress – Motion Picture Musical or Comedy (Janet McTeer, winner)
- Independent Spirit Award for Best Actress (Janet McTeer, nominee)
- Independent Spirit Award for Best Debut Performance (Kimberly J. Brown, winner)
- National Board of Review Award for Best Actress (Janet McTeer, winner)
- Satellite Award for Best Actress – Motion Picture Musical or Comedy (Janet McTeer, winner)
- Screen Actors Guild Award for Outstanding Performance by a Female Actor in a Leading Role – Motion Picture (Janet McTeer, nominee)
- Sundance Film Festival Filmmaker Trophy (Gavin O'Connor, winner)
- Sundance Film Festival Grand Jury Prize (Gavin O'Connor, nominee)
- Young Artist Award for Best Performance in a Feature Film – Leading Young Actress (Kimberly J. Brown, winner)
