= Albert Nobbs =

2011 film by Rodrigo García

- Theatrical release poster
- Directed by: Rodrigo García
- Screenplay by: Glenn Close; John Banville; Gabriella Prekop
- Story by: István Szabó
- Based on: The Singular Life of Albert Nobbs by George Moore
- Produced by: Glenn Close; Bonnie Curtis; Julie Lynn; John Goff
- Starring: Glenn Close; Mia Wasikowska; Aaron Johnson; Janet McTeer
- Cinematography: Michael McDonough
- Edited by: Steven Weisberg
- Music by: Brian Byrne
- Production companies: Mockingbird Pictures; Trillium Productions; Parallel Film Productions; Morrison Films; WestEnd Films; Chrysalis Films; Allen & Associates; Canal+ Bord Scannán na hÉireann/The Irish Film Board
- Distributed by: Entertainment One (United Kingdom and Ireland); LD Entertainment; Roadside Attractions (United States)
- Release dates: 2 September 2011 (Telluride); 27 January 2012 (United States)
- Running time: 113 minutes
- Countries: United Kingdom; Ireland; United States
- Language: English
- Budget: €6 million (~$7.5 million)
- Box office: $8.5 million

Albert Nobbs is a 2011 period drama film directed by Rodrigo García and starring Glenn Close. The screenplay, by Close, John Banville and Gabriella Prekop, is based on the 1927 novella Albert Nobbs by George Moore. The novella had been earlier adapted as a play entitled The Singular Life of Albert Nobbs in which Close starred Off-Broadway in 1982 and for which she won an Obie Award for Best Actress.

The film received mixed reviews from critics, though the performances of Close and Janet McTeer were praised. They were nominated for the Academy Award in the categories of Best Actress and Best Supporting Actress, respectively, and also received Golden Globe Award and Screen Actors Guild Award nominations. The film was also nominated for the Academy Award for Best Makeup.

== Plot ==
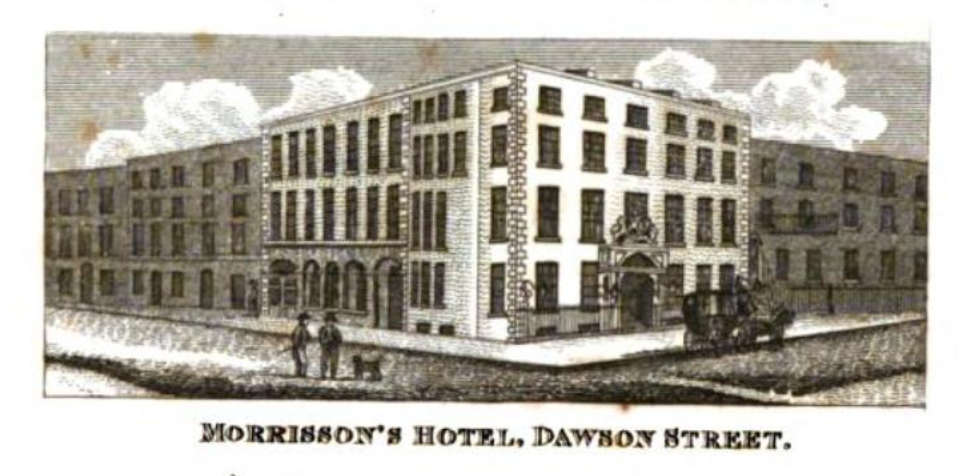
An illustration of Morrison's Hotel, Dublin from 1821.

Albert Nobbs is an English butler at the Morrison Hotel in late-19th-century Dublin, Ireland; his boss is Mrs. Baker. Although born female, Albert has spent the last 30 years living as a man. He has also been secretly saving money to buy a tobacconist shop to gain some measure of freedom and independence.

Recently unemployed Joe Mackins arrives at the hotel and cons his way into a boilerman job. He and a maid there, Helen Dawes, become lovers. Hubert Page, tasked with painting at the hotel, discovers Albert's secret. He reveals to Albert that he is keeping the same secret about himself, living as a man after escaping an abusive husband.

Albert visits Hubert at his home and meets Cathleen, Hubert's wife. Albert tells Hubert the story of his life: born illegitimate and then abandoned, Albert was adopted by a Mrs. Nobbs and educated in a convent before being expelled after his mother died. One night, aged 14 and still living as a girl, Albert was brutally gang-raped and beaten by a group of men. After hearing there was a need for waiters, Albert bought a suit, was interviewed and hired, and began his life with a male identity.

Believing Helen may be the ideal wife to run a shop with, Albert asks her out on a date. She refuses, but Joe, believing that Albert will give Helen money that could help the pair emigrate to America, encourages her to lead Albert on. She agrees to this approach, allowing Albert to buy her gifts. Helen is uncomfortable with Albert and the arrangement that Joe has persuaded her to make. Albert also tells Helen about his plan to buy a shop. Typhoid fever ravages Ireland and many, including Albert, get ill.

Helen eventually discovers she is pregnant with Joe's child. Joe is terrified, fearing he will become like his abusive father. Meanwhile, Albert goes to Hubert's home one day and learns that Cathleen has died of typhoid, leaving Hubert devastated. Albert and Hubert put on dresses made by Cathleen. Though both at first are extremely uncomfortable, they eventually spend a fun day together dressed as women. A stumble and fall by Albert on the beach brings them back to reality. The pair return to Hubert's, change back into their men's clothing, and go back to their lives as before.

Back at the hotel, Albert learns Helen is pregnant and offers to marry her. She refuses, saying Albert does not love her, though Albert voices a fear that Joe will leave by himself for America and not take her and the child. Later that evening, Joe and Helen get into a loud fight after Joe reveals he is indeed going to America alone. Albert attacks Joe when he gets physical with Helen, and Joe throws Albert against a wall, giving him a head injury. Albert retires to bed, forgotten in the commotion, bleeding from one ear. Helen angrily tells Joe she no longer wants to be with him anyway, and he leaves. Helen finds Albert dead in his bed the next morning.

Helen eventually gives birth to a son, Albert Joseph. It is implied Mrs. Baker found Albert's savings, and hires Hubert again to make improvements to the hotel. When Helen sees Hubert, she breaks down and reveals she earns nothing working for Mrs. Baker, but if she objects she will be separated from her son and thrown out into the street. Hubert looks knowingly at her and says, "We can't let that happen, can we?"

== Cast ==
- Glenn Close as Albert Nobbs
- Mia Wasikowska as Helen Dawes
- Aaron Johnson as Joe Mackins
- Janet McTeer as Hubert Page
- Pauline Collins as Mrs Baker
- Brenda Fricker as Polly
- Jonathan Rhys Meyers as Viscount Yarrell
- Phoebe Waller-Bridge as Viscountess Yarrell
- Brendan Gleeson as Dr. Holloran
- Maria Doyle Kennedy as Mary
- Mark Williams as Seán
- Serena Brabazon as Mrs. Moore
- Michael McElhatton as Mr Moore
- Kenneth Collard as Mr Pigot
- Bronagh Gallagher as Cathleen Page
- Antonia Campbell-Hughes as Emmy

== Production ==
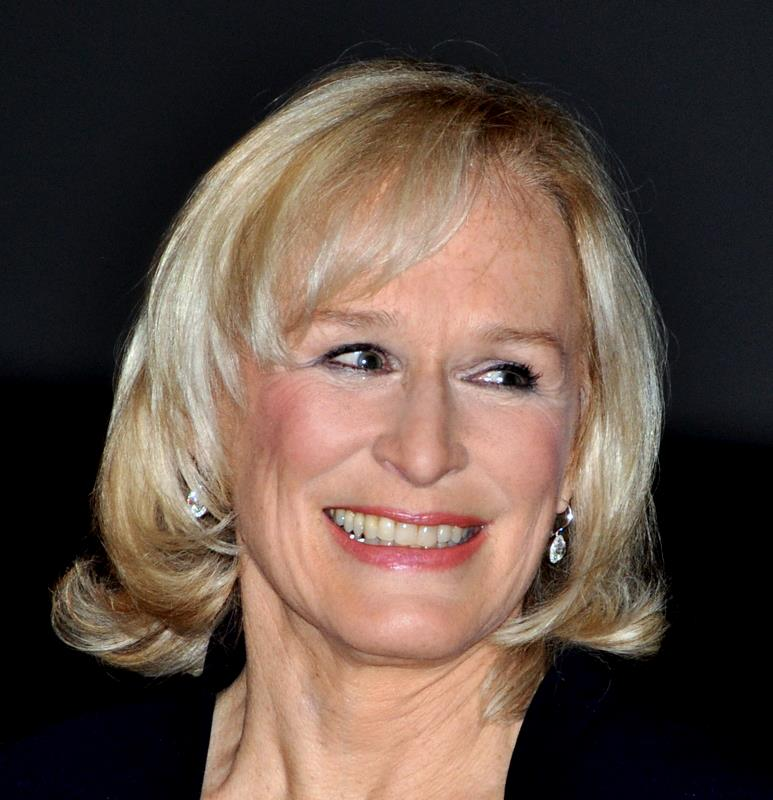
Close in Paris at the film's French premiere in 2012

Close first played the titular character in a 1982 stage production and spent 15 years trying to turn it into a film. The film almost went into production in the early 2000s, with director István Szabó, but the financing fell through. In addition to her starring role, Close is also a producer and co-writer with John Banville.

Production was scheduled to begin in July 2010 but was delayed until December, when Mia Wasikowska and Aaron Johnson replaced Amanda Seyfried and Orlando Bloom. Filming commenced on 13 December on location in Dublin and Wicklow. In July 2011, it was announced that Albert Nobbs would screen at the 2011 Toronto International Film Festival in September and the first official photos from the film were released.

== Reception ==
=== Box office ===
Albert Nobbs grossed $3 million in the United States and Canada, and $4.7 million in other territories, for a worldwide total of $7.1 million.

In the United States, the film had a limited awards-qualifying release in December 2011, and opened at 245 locations on January 27, 2012. It made $696,088 in its opening weekend, and then $490,762 in its second.

=== Critical response ===
Rotten Tomatoes reports that 56% of 158 critics gave the film a positive review. The site's consensus reads, "Albert Nobbs tells a worthy story with an outstanding performance at its core, even if the end result is often somewhat less than the sum of its admirable parts". Metacritic gave the film a weighted average score of 57 out of 100 based on 42 critics, indicating "mixed or average reviews".

=== Accolades ===
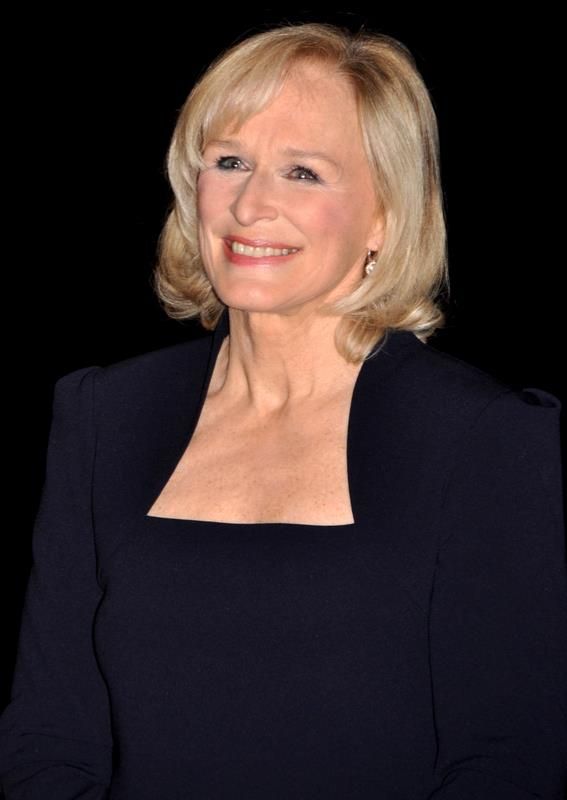
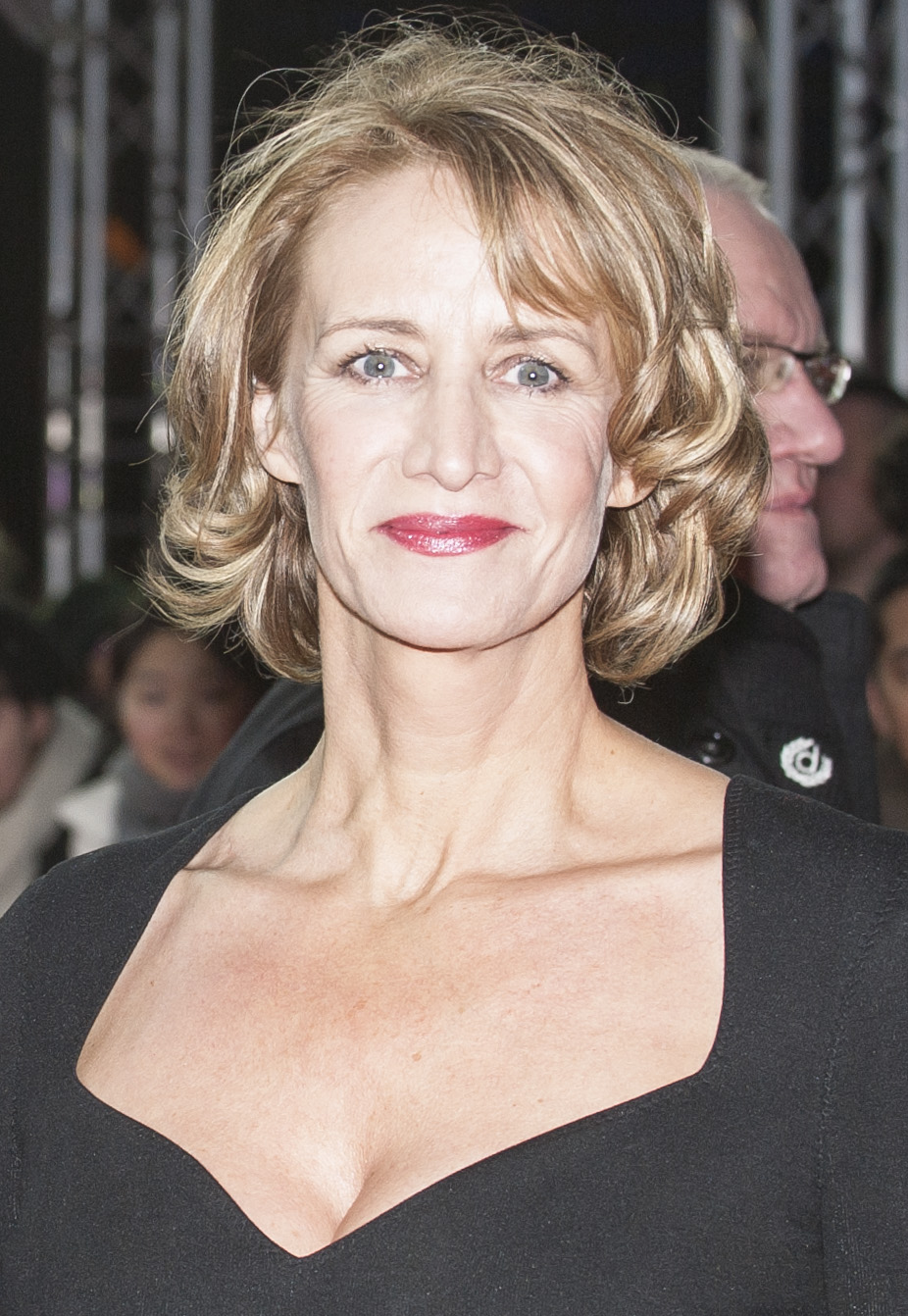
The performances of Glenn Close and Janet McTeer garnered critical acclaim, earning them Academy Award nominations for Best Actress and Best Supporting Actress respectively.

Award	Category	Recipient	Result
84th Academy Awards	Best Actress	Glenn Close	Nominated
84th Academy Awards	Best Supporting Actress	Janet McTeer	Nominated
84th Academy Awards	Best Makeup	Martial Corneville; Lynn Johnston; Matthew W. Mungle	Nominated
AARP's Movies for Grownups Awards	Best Actress	Glenn Close	Won
Alliance of Women Film Journalists	Best Actress in a Supporting Role	Janet McTeer	Nominated
Alliance of Women Film Journalists	Female Icon Award	Glenn Close	Won
Alliance of Women Film Journalists	Actress Defying Age and Ageism	Glenn Close	Nominated
Alliance of Women Film Journalists	Most Egregious Love Interest Age Difference Award	Glenn Close (64), Mia Wasikowska (22)	Won
1st AACTA International Awards	Best Actress – International	Glenn Close	Nominated
Broadcast Film Critics Association Awards	Best Makeup	Lorraine Glynn; Lynn Johnson	Nominated
GLAAD Media Awards	Outstanding Film – Wide Release		Nominated
Golden Globe Awards	Best Actress in a Motion Picture – Drama	Glenn Close	Nominated
Golden Globe Awards	Best Supporting Actress – Motion Picture	Janet McTeer	Nominated
Golden Globe Awards	Best Original Song	"Lay Your Head Down" by Brian Byrne and Glenn Close	Nominated
Independent Spirit Awards	Best Supporting Female	Janet McTeer	Nominated
Irish Film & Television Academy	Best Film	Alan Moloney; Bonnie Curtis; Julie Lynn; Glenn Close	Nominated
Irish Film & Television Academy	Best Script for Film	John Banville; Glenn Close	Nominated
Irish Film & Television Academy	Best International Actress	Glenn Close	Won
Irish Film & Television Academy	Best Actor in a Supporting Role in a Feature Film	Brendan Gleeson	Nominated
Irish Film & Television Academy	Best Actress in a Supporting Role in a Feature Film	Brenda Fricker	Nominated
Irish Film & Television Academy	Best Actress in a Supporting Role in a Feature Film	Maria Doyle Kennedy	Nominated
Irish Film & Television Academy	Best Make-up and Hair	Lorraine Glynn; Lynn Johnson	Won
Irish Film & Television Academy	Best Original Score	Brian Byrne	Won
Irish Film & Television Academy	Best Sound	Brendan Deasy; Niall Brady; Michelle Cunniffe; Steve Fanagan	Won
Los Angeles Film Critics Association	Best Supporting Actress	Janet McTeer	Runner-up
Online Film Critics Society	Best Supporting Actress	Janet McTeer	Nominated
Phoenix Film Critics Society	Best Actress	Glenn Close	Nominated
Satellite Awards	Best Actress – Motion Picture	Glenn Close	Nominated
Satellite Awards	Best Supporting Actress – Supporting Role	Janet McTeer	Nominated
Satellite Awards	Best Adapted Screenplay	George Moore; Glenn Close; John Banville; The play by Gabriella Prekop	Nominated
Satellite Awards	Best Original Song	"Lay Your Head Down" by Brian Byrne and Glenn Close	Won
Screen Actors Guild Awards	Outstanding Performance by a Female Actor in a Leading Role	Glenn Close	Nominated
Screen Actors Guild Awards	Outstanding Performance by a Female Actor in a Supporting Role	Janet McTeer	Nominated
Southeastern Film Critics Association	Best Supporting Actress	Janet McTeer	Won
Tokyo International Film Festival	Best Actress	Glenn Close	Won
Tokyo International Film Festival	Tokyo Grand Prix	Rodrigo García	Nominated
Women Film Critics Circle	Best Movie About Women		Nominated
Women Film Critics Circle	Best Female Images in a Movie		Nominated
Women Film Critics Circle	Courage in Acting – Taking on unconventional roles that radically redefine the images of women on screen	Glenn Close	Won
Women Film Critics Circle	Women's Work: Best Ensemble		Nominated
Women Film Critics Circle	World Soundtrack Award for Best Original Song Written Directly for a Film	Glenn Close, Brian Byrne and Sinéad O'Connor	Won
