= Into the Storm (2009 film) =

2009 biographical film

- Promotional release poster
- Genre: biographical drama
- Written by: Hugh Whitemore
- Directed by: Thaddeus O'Sullivan
- Starring: Brendan Gleeson; Janet McTeer; James D'Arcy; Patrick Malahide; Robert Pugh
- Music by: Howard Goodall
- Countries of origin: United Kingdom; United States
- Original language: English

Production
- Executive producers: Ridley Scott; Tony Scott; David W. Zucker; David M. Thompson
- Producers: Frank Doelger; Tracey Scoffield; Julie Payne; Ann Wingate
- Cinematography: Michel Amathieu
- Editor: Heidi Freeman
- Running time: 100 minutes
- Production companies: HBO Films; BBC Films; Scott Free; Rainmark Films

Original release
- Network: HBO
- Release: 31 May 2009

Into the Storm or Churchill at War (alt. title) is a 2009 biographical film about Winston Churchill and his days in office during the Second World War. The movie is directed by Thaddeus O'Sullivan and stars Brendan Gleeson as the British Prime Minister. Into the Storm is a sequel to the 2002 television film The Gathering Storm, which details the life of Churchill in the years just prior the war. Into the Storm had its first public premiere on HBO and HBO Canada on 31 May 2009.

Into the Storm was nominated for 14 Primetime Emmy Awards. Brendan Gleeson won the Primetime Emmy Award for Outstanding Lead Actor in a Miniseries or a Movie.

== Synopsis ==
The Second World War has recently ended in Europe, and the people of the United Kingdom are awaiting the results of the 1945 general election. During this time, Winston Churchill goes to France for a holiday with his wife Clemmie. Through a series of flashbacks, Churchill recalls some of his most glorious moments during the war, and the effect it had on their marriage.

Into the Storm continues on from The Gathering Storm. It is set against the backdrop of World War II, and looks at how Churchill's success as a great wartime leader ultimately undermined his political career and threatened his marriage to "Clemmie" - Clementine Hozier.

The film proper begins shortly after the Second World War commences in September 1939, as Prime Minister Neville Chamberlain calls Churchill and Edward Wood, 1st Earl of Halifax, to a private meeting. Chamberlain informs Halifax and Churchill that he knows he will be condemned by the British public for failing to recognize Hitler as a threat in time, and therefore intends to resign from office. Asked if he would be willing to hold the office of Minister for War under Lord Halifax as the new Prime Minister, Churchill remains silent until Halifax reluctantly speaks up, indicating Churchill would be the better choice as Prime Minister. Churchill then intones, "Yes. I think so, too."

Churchill immediately moves to take charge of a confused, overworked government and lead the British people into a second world war. He argues bitterly with some members of his cabinet, including Lord Halifax, as the situation in Continental Europe rapidly deteriorates. As country after country falls to the German invaders, Churchill adamantly maintains that no deal with Hitler will ever be considered, let alone accepted. Though much-criticized for it at the time within his government, Churchill's decision hardens British resolve: with any idea of parley with the Nazis out of the question, the only route forward is to fight on until the end. Churchill gathers influential members of the leftist Labour Party and convinces them to forge a coalition government, arguing that political and personal differences must be set aside to win the war. He meets then-unknown Major General Bernard Montgomery at a static gun emplacement on the British coastline, and approves the stern-faced Montgomery's demand that his division be provided with buses in order to rapidly move to wherever German forces might land.

Because night bombing on continental Europe with restricted and specific targets has been ineffective, Air Marshal Arthur Harris urges Churchill to commence bombing German factories. Clement Attlee argues against this due to the inevitable heavy collateral damage that this would cause, but is overruled by Churchill, who tells Harris to "Let them have it." Churchill soon after visits a Royal Air Force fighter squadron in the midst of the Battle of Britain, where he is well received by the young pilots until they are interrupted by a scramble call. As the pilots sprint to their fighters and take off, Churchill solemnly removes his cap in salute. As he returns to his car, he tells an aide, "They're so young. There's so few of them. Never in the field of human conflict have so many owed so much to so few." Churchill is fascinated by the impossible odds facing Britain in the battle and the war overall; they drive him to be utterly indomitable in the face of the Nazi threat, seeming to Churchill as the fulfillment of a personal wish to protect the British Empire in its greatest hour of need.

The film periodically shows Churchill's counterpart in the United States, President Franklin Delano Roosevelt, with whom he steadily establishes a strong friendship despite Roosevelt's early dislike for Churchill as a hawkish imperialist. Churchill works relentlessly to persuade Roosevelt to bring the United States into the war, although this does not fully happen until the Japanese attack on Pearl Harbor on 7 December 1941. King George VI, initially dismayed at having to deal with Churchill instead of Halifax, also is won over by Churchill's courage and personal charm over the years. When a naval aide finally brings Churchill the news that Germany has surrendered unconditionally as of midnight on 8 May 1945, Churchill is invited to join the King and his family on the balcony at Buckingham Palace before a jubilant crowd of thousands that has gathered in the street outside.

An end to the war does not mean all is well, however. Labour leader Clement Attlee soon comes to Churchill and resigns from the cabinet, dissolving the coalition government. Churchill fights against both the Labour Party, whom he privately despises, and any discussion of considering the war as truly over while Japan remains undefeated. The British people have had enough of war, however, and the Labour Party gains traction as Churchill continues to insist on staying on a war footing until the Pacific campaign is finished. Against his wife's strong objections, Churchill goes on the air and in a live radio speech condemns the Labour Party as being no different from communists and says that they would have to "resort to some form of Gestapo" to maintain control if they were voted into office. The result is predictable: both leftist Britons and Britons weary of a long and bloody war vote Churchill out of office, replacing him with Clement Attlee. Churchill broods over his fate, over the changing of the times and the gradual dissipation of the old way of life he holds dear, and admits that he feels lonely without a war to bring him purpose. When asked if he would want to relive the war again, Churchill tells an aide, "1940. Just 1940."

The war's end also brings about a renewed push for independence by British colonial possessions, and their inevitable success means the permanent dissolution of one of Churchill's most beloved institutions, the British Empire. Out of office, feeling lost and betrayed by the very people he fought so hard to defend, Churchill is resentful and bitter while Clementine brings them both to attend a play in London one night. The Churchills' presence in the theater does not go unnoticed, however; at the conclusion of the play, one of the actors announces Churchill, hailing him as "the savior of our nation." The entire theater stands to applaud and cheer as Churchill rises with Clementine, giving the "V for Victory" salute. The film closes with Churchill's personal motto for leadership in government: "In War: Resolution. In Defeat: Defiance. In Victory: Magnanimity. In Peace: Good Will."

== Cast ==
- Brendan Gleeson as Winston Churchill
- Adrian Scarborough as Sawyers
- Clive Mantle as Walter H. Thompson
- Jack Shepherd as Neville Chamberlain
- Donald Sumpter as Edward Wood, 1st Earl of Halifax
- Iain Glen as King George VI
- James D'Arcy as Jock Colville
- Bill Paterson as Clement Attlee
- Bruce Alexander as Duff Cooper
- Janet McTeer as Clementine Churchill
- Michael Elwyn as Charles Wilson, 1st Baron Moran
- Robert Pugh as Hastings Ismay, 1st Baron Ismay
- Terrence Hardiman as Richard Pim
- Garrick Hagon as Harry Hopkins
- Len Cariou as Franklin D. Roosevelt
- Patrick Malahide as Bernard Montgomery
- Geoffrey Kirkness as Alan Brooke, 1st Viscount Alanbrooke
- Philip McGough as Aneurin Bevan
- Michael Pennington as Sir Arthur Harris, 1st Baronet
- Aleksey Petrenko as Joseph Stalin
- Emma Hamilton as Betty

== Awards and nominations ==
Year	Award	Category	Nominee(s)	Result	Ref.
2009	Online Film & Television Association Awards	Best Motion Picture		Nominated	
2009	Online Film & Television Association Awards	Best Actor in a Motion Picture or Miniseries	Brendan Gleeson	Nominated	
2009	Online Film & Television Association Awards	Best Supporting Actor in a Motion Picture or Miniseries	Len Cariou	Nominated	
2009	Online Film & Television Association Awards	Best Supporting Actress in a Motion Picture or Miniseries	Janet McTeer	Nominated	
2009	Online Film & Television Association Awards	Best Direction of a Motion Picture or Miniseries	Thaddeus O'Sullivan	Nominated	
2009	Online Film & Television Association Awards	Best Writing of a Motion Picture or Miniseries	Hugh Whitemore	Nominated	
2009	Online Film & Television Association Awards	Best Ensemble in a Motion Picture or Miniseries		Nominated	
2009	Online Film & Television Association Awards	Best Costume Design in a Motion Picture or Miniseries		Nominated	
2009	Online Film & Television Association Awards	Best Lighting in a Motion Picture or Miniseries		Nominated	
2009	Online Film & Television Association Awards	Best Makeup/Hairstyling in a Motion Picture or Miniseries		Nominated	
2009	Online Film & Television Association Awards	Best Music in a Motion Picture or Miniseries		Nominated	
2009	Online Film & Television Association Awards	Best Production Design in a Motion Picture or Miniseries		Nominated	
2009	Online Film & Television Association Awards	Best Sound in a Motion Picture or Miniseries		Nominated	
2009	Online Film & Television Association Awards	Best Visual Effects in a Motion Picture or Miniseries		Nominated	
2009	Primetime Emmy Awards	Outstanding Made for Television Movie	Ridley Scott, David M. Thompson, Frank Doelger, Tracey Scoffield, Julie Payne, and Ann Wingate	Nominated	
2009	Primetime Emmy Awards	Outstanding Lead Actor in a Miniseries or a Movie	Brendan Gleeson	Won	
2009	Primetime Emmy Awards	Outstanding Supporting Actor in a Miniseries or a Movie	Len Cariou	Nominated	
2009	Primetime Emmy Awards	Outstanding Supporting Actress in a Miniseries or a Movie	Janet McTeer	Nominated	
2009	Primetime Emmy Awards	Outstanding Directing for a Miniseries, Movie or Dramatic Special	Thaddeus O'Sullivan	Nominated	
2009	Primetime Emmy Awards	Outstanding Writing for a Miniseries, Movie or Dramatic Special	Hugh Whitemore	Nominated	
2009	Primetime Creative Arts Emmy Awards	Outstanding Art Direction for a Miniseries or Movie	Luciana Arrighi, Paul Ghirardani, and Ian Whittaker	Nominated	
2009	Primetime Creative Arts Emmy Awards	Outstanding Casting for a Miniseries, Movie or Special	Kate Rhodes James	Nominated	
2009	Primetime Creative Arts Emmy Awards	Outstanding Cinematography for a Miniseries or Movie	Michel Amathieu	Nominated	
2009	Primetime Creative Arts Emmy Awards	Outstanding Costumes for a Miniseries, Movie or Special	Consolata Boyle and Marion Weise	Nominated	
2009	Primetime Creative Arts Emmy Awards	Outstanding Hairstyling for a Miniseries or Movie	Kerin Parfitt and Stefano Ceccarelli	Nominated	
2009	Primetime Creative Arts Emmy Awards	Outstanding Music Composition for a Miniseries, Movie or Special (Original Dramatic Score)	Howard Goodall	Won	
2009	Primetime Creative Arts Emmy Awards	Outstanding Sound Editing for a Miniseries, Movie or a Special	Mark Auguste, Sam Auguste, Glen Gathard, Graham Sutton, Peter Burgess, and Andy Derek	Nominated	
2009	Primetime Creative Arts Emmy Awards	Outstanding Special Visual Effects for a Miniseries, Movie or a Special	Gary Brown, Sue Rowe, Angie Wills, Chloe Grysole, Phil Brown, Mark Robinson, Andy Robinson, and Sevendalino Khay	Nominated	
2009	Satellite Awards	Best Motion Picture Made for Television		Nominated	
2009	Satellite Awards	Best Actor in a Miniseries or Motion Picture Made for Television	Brendan Gleeson	Won	
2009	Satellite Awards	Best Actress in a Miniseries or Motion Picture Made for Television	Janet McTeer	Nominated	
2010	American Cinema Editors Awards	Best Edited Miniseries or Motion Picture for Television	John Bloom and Antonia Van Drimmelen	Nominated	
2010	British Academy Television Awards	Best Actor	Brendan Gleeson	Nominated	
2010	Cinema Audio Society Awards	Outstanding Achievement in Sound Mixing for Television Movies and Miniseries	Martin Trevis and Brendan Nicholson	Nominated	
2010	Critics' Choice Awards	Best Picture Made for Television		Nominated	
2010	Golden Globe Awards	Best Miniseries or Television Film		Nominated	
2010	Golden Globe Awards	Best Actor – Miniseries or Television Film	Brendan Gleeson	Nominated	
2010	Golden Globe Awards	Best Supporting Actress – Series, Miniseries or Television Film	Janet McTeer	Nominated	
2010	Irish Film & Television Awards	Best Actor in a Lead Role – Television	Brendan Gleeson	Won	
2010	Irish Film & Television Awards	Best Director – Television	Thaddeus O'Sullivan	Won	

== See also ==
- The Gathering Storm - 1974 similar film starring Richard Burton
- The Gathering Storm - 2002 film starring Albert Finney
- Churchill - 2017 film starring Brian Cox as Churchill
- Darkest Hour - 2017 film starring Gary Oldman
- Dunkirk - 2017 film focusing on Operation Dynamo
- List of World War II films
