= Janet McTeer =

English actress (born 1961)

Janet McTeer OBE
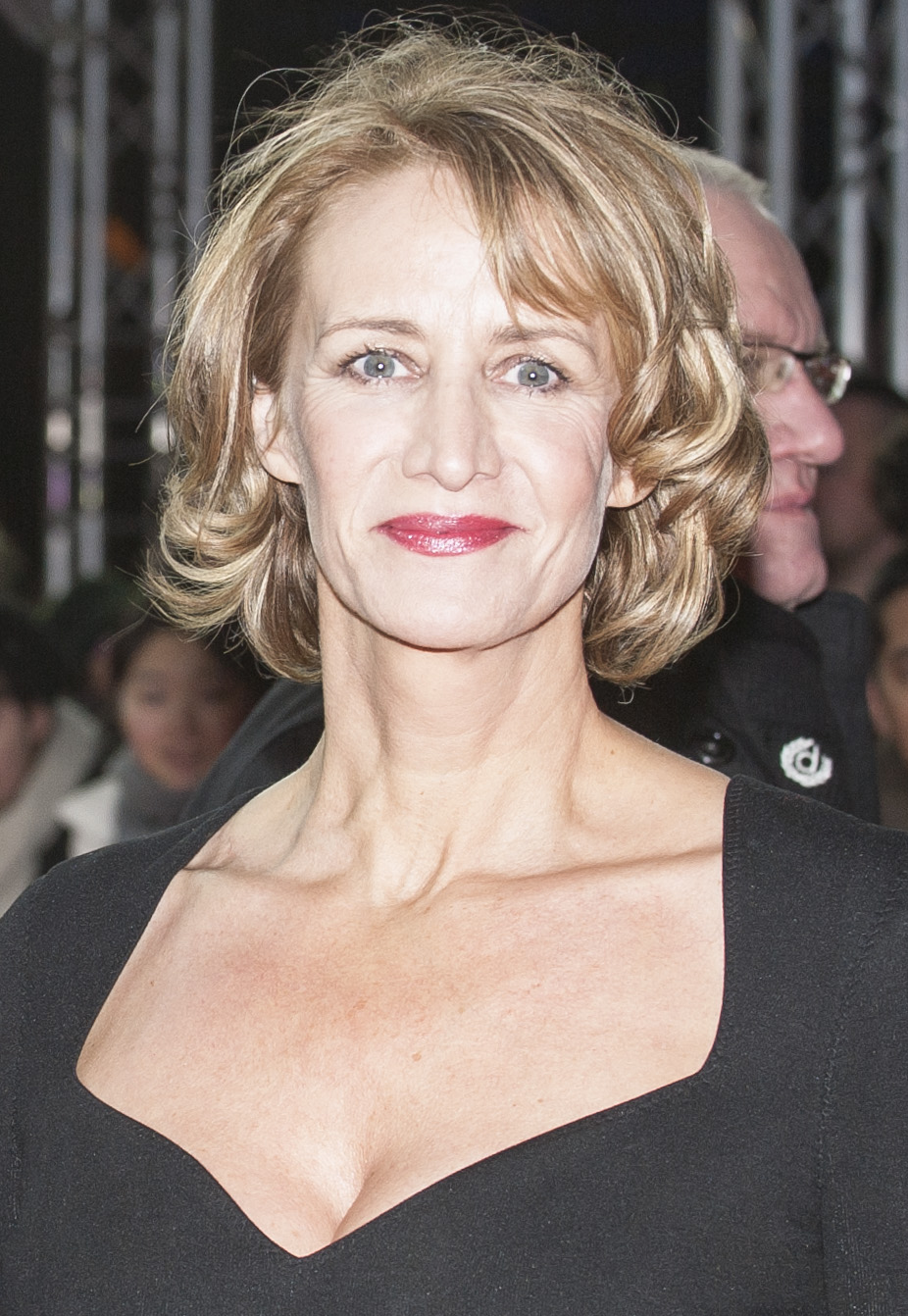
- McTeer in 2015
- Born: 5 August 1961 (age 65); Wallsend, North Tyneside, England
- Citizenship: United Kingdom; United States
- Education: Royal Academy of Dramatic Art
- Occupation: Actress
- Years active: 1982–present
- Spouse: Joseph Coleman (m. 2010)

Janet McTeer (born 5 August 1961) is an English actress. She has received numerous accolades including a Tony Award, an Olivier Award, and a Golden Globe Award as well as nominations for two Academy Awards and a Primetime Emmy Award. In 2008 she was appointed an Officer of the Order of the British Empire (OBE) for her services to drama.

McTeer made her professional stage debut in 1984, and was nominated for the 1986 Olivier Award for Best Newcomer for The Grace of Mary Traverse. She received the Laurence Olivier Award for Best Actress, and the Tony Award for Best Actress in a Play for her performance in A Doll's House in 1997. For her roles on Broadway, she received two other nominations for Mary Stuart in 2009 and Bernhardt/Hamlet in 2019.

McTeer has also gained acclaim for her film roles, having received two Academy Award nominations, one for Best Actress for Tumbleweeds in 1999, and the other for Best Supporting Actress for Albert Nobbs in 2011. Other roles include Wuthering Heights (1992), Carrington (1995), Velvet Goldmine (1998), Songcatcher (2000), As You Like It (2006), The Divergent Series (2015–2016), and The Menu (2022).

On television, she starred in the title role of Lynda La Plante's The Governor (1995–1996), and received a Primetime Emmy Award nomination for her portrayal of Clementine Churchill in the HBO film Into the Storm (2009). She is also known for her roles in Damages (2012), The White Queen (2013), The Honourable Woman (2014), Jessica Jones (2018), Sorry for Your Loss (2018–2019), and Ozark (2018–2020).

== Early life and education ==
McTeer was born on 5 August 1961 in Wallsend, North Tyneside, and spent her childhood in York.

She attended the now defunct Queen Anne Grammar School for Girls in York, and in her teens worked selling tickets at the Old Starre Inn, at York Minster and at the city's Theatre Royal. She performed locally with the Rowntree Players at Joseph Rowntree Theatre. After following advice from fellow actor Gary Oldman, she furthered her acting skills at the Royal Academy of Dramatic Art, graduating in 1983 with an Acting (RADA Diploma).

== Career ==
After graduating from RADA, McTeer began a successful theatrical career with the Royal Exchange Theatre.

=== 1985–1999: Early roles ===
McTeer's television work includes playing Vita Sackville-West,the BBC production Portrait of a Marriage, She starred in the Lynda La Plante written ITV series The Governor. She made her screen debut in Half Moon Street (1986), She appeared alongside Bob Peck and Geraldine Somerville in Catherine Cookson's The Black Velvet Gown (1991), which won the International Emmy award for best drama. She co-starred with Juliette Binoche and Ralph Fiennes in Emily Brontë's Wuthering Heights (1992), and starred alongside Emma Thompson and Jonathan Pryce) in the film Carrington (1995).

In 1996, McTeer garnered critical acclaim – and both the Laurence Olivier Theatre Award and Critics' Circle Theatre Award – for her performance as Nora Helmer in a West End production of Henrik Ibsen's A Doll's House. The following year, the production transferred to Broadway, and McTeer received a Tony Award, a Theatre World Award, and the Drama Desk Award for Best Actress in a Play.

During the show's run, McTeer was interviewed by Charlie Rose on his PBS talk show, where she was seen by American filmmaker Gavin O'Connor, who, at the time, was working on a screenplay about a single mother's cross-country wanderings with her pre-teenage daughter. He was determined that she star in the film. When prospective backers balked at her relative anonymity in the US, he produced the film himself. Tumbleweeds proved to be a 1999 Sundance Film Festival favourite, and McTeer's performance won her a Golden Globe as Best Actress and Academy Award and Screen Actors Guild nominations in the same category.

=== 2000–2009 ===
McTeer's screen credits include Songcatcher (with Aidan Quinn), Waking the Dead, (with Billy Crudup and Jennifer Connelly), the dogme film The King Is Alive, (with Jennifer Jason Leigh), The Intended, (with Brenda Fricker and Olympia Dukakis), and Tideland, written and directed by Terry Gilliam. She also starred in the BBC dramatisation of Mary Webb's Precious Bane in 1989. She has appeared in such British television serials as The Amazing Mrs Pritchard, Hunter, and Agatha Christie's Marple (episode: "The Murder at the Vicarage").

McTeer played Mary, Queen of Scots in Mary Stuart, a play by Friedrich Schiller in a new version by Peter Oswald, directed by Phyllida Lloyd. She acted opposite Harriet Walter as Queen Elizabeth I in London's West End in 2005, a role she reprised in the 2009 Broadway transfer. McTeer received a Tony Award nomination for her role in Mary Stuart, and won the Drama Desk Award for Outstanding Actress in a Play.

In 2008, she starred in God of Carnage in the West End alongside Tamsin Greig, Ken Stott and Ralph Fiennes, at the Gielgud Theatre. She reprised her role on Broadway opposite Jeff Daniels from March to June 2010.

In 2009, she portrayed Clementine Churchill in the HBO feature Into the Storm, about Sir Winston Churchill's years as Britain's leader during World War II.

=== 2010–2019 ===
In 2011, McTeer starred alongside Glenn Close in Albert Nobbs and with Daniel Radcliffe and Ciarán Hinds in The Woman in Black. Her role as Hubert Page in Albert Nobbs won McTeer critical acclaim and numerous award nominations, including an Academy Award nomination for Best Supporting Actress. It was announced in November 2011 that McTeer had joined the cast of Damages (in the character of Kate Franklin) for its fifth and final season, reuniting her with her Albert Nobbs co-star Glenn Close. This was her first American television series. She played American novelist Mary McCarthy in Margarethe von Trotta's film Hannah Arendt.

In 2013 McTeer was cast as Jacquetta of Luxembourg, the mother of the title character in The White Queen, a British television drama series based on Philippa Gregory's best-selling historical novel series The Cousins' War. Her performance was applauded, with Sam Wollaston of The Guardian suggesting she stole the show. In December 2013, McTeer was nominated for a Golden Globe for Best Supporting Actress for her role as Jacquetta.

On 29 July 2013, McTeer joined the cast of The Honourable Woman, a BBC spy-thriller miniseries starring Maggie Gyllenhaal. In 2015, McTeer starred as Commander Kim Guziewicz in CBS comedy-drama Battle Creek, and portrayed Princess Hermine Reuss of Greiz alongside Lily James and Christopher Plummer in The Exception (2016).

In 2016, McTeer played Petruchio in the New York Public Theater Shakespeare in the Park all-female production of The Taming of the Shrew, directed again by Phyllida Lloyd. She co-starred alongside Liev Schreiber in Les Liaisons Dangereuses on Broadway, with McTeer cast as Marquise de Merteuil. The play ran from October 2016 to January 2017.

In 2018, she played Alisa Jones in the Marvel Television and Netflix production Jessica Jones. In September 2018, she took on the role of Sarah Bernhardt in Theresa Rebeck's Broadway play Bernhardt/Hamlet. She was nominated for the 2019 Tony Award for Best Performance by an Actress in a Leading Role in a Play.

From 2018 to 2020 McTeer portrayed cartel attorney Helen Pierce on the Netflix crime drama Ozark.

=== 2020–present ===
In early 2023, McTeer appeared at London's National Theatre in a new play Phaedra. Director/playwright Simon Stone turned the Greek myth of the woman falling in love with her stepson into a satire about London elitism and post-Brexit Britain. Despite a strong cast that included French actor Assaad Bouab, Canadian screen star Mackenzie Davis, and a lead performance from McTeer, the play received mixed reviews. The Evening Standard called it "A must-see show. A high-spec, richly-textured chamber extravaganza", while The Guardian wrote "Even McTeer's strong performance cannot save a tonally unsure play". McTeer garnered a Best Actress nomination at the 2023 Olivier Awards, losing to Jodie Comer for Prima Facie. She starred in Mission: Impossible – The Final Reckoning, which premiered in 2025. McTeer will portray Minerva McGonagall in the HBO television adaptation of the Harry Potter series.

== Personal life ==
McTeer has been married to poet and fashion consultant Joseph Coleman since 2010. They reside in Maine, US.

== Acting credits ==
=== Film ===
Year	Title	Role	Notes
1986	Half Moon Street	Van Arkady's Secretary	
1988	Hawks	Hazel	
1992	Wuthering Heights	Ellen "Nelly" Dean	
1995	Carrington	Vanessa Bell	
1996	Saint-Ex	Genevieve de Ville-Franche	
1998	Velvet Goldmine	Narrator (voice)	
1999	Tumbleweeds	Mary Jo Walker	
2000	Waking the Dead	Caroline Pierce	
2000	Songcatcher	Professor Lily Penleric	
2000	The King Is Alive	Liz	
2002	The Intended	Sarah Morris	
2005	Tideland	Dell	
2006	As You Like It	Audrey	
2011	Cat Run	Helen Bingham	
2011	Island	Phyllis Lovage	
2011	Albert Nobbs	Hubert Page	
2012	The Woman in Black	Elisabeth Daily	
2012	Hannah Arendt	Mary McCarthy	
2014	Maleficent	Elderly Princess Aurora (voice)	
2015	Angelica	Anne Montague	
2015	Insurgent	Edith Prior	
2015	Fathers and Daughters	Carolyn	
2016	Allegiant	Edith Prior	
2016	Me Before You	Camilla Traynor	
2016	National Theatre Live: Les Liaisons Dangereuses	Marquise de Merteuil	
2016	Paint It Black	Meredith	
2016	The Exception	Princess Hermine "Hermo" Reuss of Greiz	
2022	The Menu	Lillian Bloom	
2022	Glimpse	Lucienne	
2025	Mission: Impossible – The Final Reckoning	Walters	

=== Television ===
Year	Title	Role	Notes
1985	Juliet Bravo	Esther Pearson	Episode: "Flesh and Blood"
1986	Gems	Stephanie Wilde	2 episodes
1987	Theatre Night	Miss Julie	Episode: "Miss Julie"
1988	Les Girls	Susan	7 episodes
1989	Precious Bane	Prue Sarn	Television film
1990	The Play on One	Juliet Horowitz	Episode: "Yellowbacks"
1990	Portrait of a Marriage	Vita Sackville-West	4 episodes
1990	Screen Two	Celeste	Episode: "102 Boulevard Haussmann"
1990–1991	Screen One	Adult Claudie/Caroline	2 episodes
1991	The Black Velvet Gown	Riah Millican	Television film
1992	Dead Romantic	Madeleine Severn	Television film
1992	A Masculine Ending	Loretta Lawson	Television film
1993	Don't Leave Me This Way	Loretta Lawson	Television film
1994	Jackanory	Reader	Episode: "The Iron Woman"
1995–1996	The Governor	Helen Hewitt	12 episodes
2004	Agatha Christie's Marple	Anne Protheroe	Episode: "Agatha Christie's Marple: The Murder at the Vicarage"
2006	The Amazing Mrs Pritchard	Catherine Walker	6 episodes
2007	Five Days	DS Amy Foster	4 episodes
2007	Daphne	Gertrude Lawrence	Television film
2008	Sense and Sensibility	Mrs Dashwood	3 episodes
2008	Masterpiece Theatre	Mrs Dashwood	Episode: "Sense and Sensibility"
2009	Hunter	DS Amy Foster	2 episodes
2009	Into the Storm	Clementine Churchill	Television film
2009	Psychoville	Cheryl	2 episodes
2011	Weekends at Bellevue	Diana Wallace	Television film
2012	Parade's End	Mrs Satterthwaite	4 episodes
2012	Damages	Kate Franklin	9 episodes
2013	The White Queen	Jacquetta of Luxembourg	6 episodes
2014	The Honourable Woman	Julia Walsh	8 episodes
2015	Battle Creek	Commander Kim Guziewicz	Main cast, 13 episodes
2016	Marks and Spencer	Mrs Claus	Advert
2018	Jessica Jones	Alisa Jones	11 episodes
2018–2019	Sorry for Your Loss	Amy Shaw	Main role; 11 episodes
2018–2020	Ozark	Helen Pierce	Recurring role (seasons 2 & 3)
2020	The President Is Missing	Carolyn Brock	Television film
2023	Julius Caesar: The Making of a Dictator	Narrator	Miniseries
2024	Kaos	Hera	Main cast; 8 episodes
2024	The Old Man	Marion	Recurring role (season 2)
2025	Gangs of London	Isabel Vaughn	Episode: "Episode #3.8"
2025–present	MobLand	Kat McAllister	Main cast; 4 episodes
2025	The Artist	Marian Henry	6 episodes
2026–present	Harry Potter	Minerva McGonagall	Main cast

=== Theatre ===
Year	Title	Role	Notes
1996	A Doll's House	Nora Helmer	Playhouse Theatre, London
1997	A Doll's House	Nora Helmer	Belasco Theatre, Broadway
2009	God of Carnage	Veronica (replacement)	Bernard B. Jacobs Theatre, Broadway
2009	Mary Stuart	Mary Stuart	Broadhurst Theatre, Broadway
2016	Les Liaisons Dangereuses	La Marquise de Merteuil	Booth Theatre, Broadway
2018	Bernhardt / Hamlet	Sarah Bernhardt	American Airlines Theatre, Broadway
2023	Phaedra	Helen	National Theatre, London

=== Video games ===
Year	Title	Role	Notes
1998	Populous: The Beginning	The Shaman, Additional voices (voice)	

== Awards and nominations ==
McTeer was appointed an Officer of the Order of the British Empire (OBE) in the 2008 Queen's Birthday Honours.

== See also ==
- List of Academy Award winners and nominees from Great Britain
- List of actors with Academy Award nominations
- List of actors with more than one Academy Award nomination in the acting categories
- List of Golden Globe winners
