= Ian Begg (architect) =

Scottish architect

- Ian Begg (2013)
- Born: Ian McKerron Begg; 23 June 1925; Kirkcaldy, Scotland
- Died: 26 November 2017 (aged 92); Plockton, Scotland
- Resting place: Balmacara Cemetery
- Citizenship: British
- Education: Edinburgh College of Art
- Occupation: Architect
- Spouses: Agnes; Ruth née Fisken
- Partner: Lennox Savage
- Children: 5
- Awards: Nigel Tranter Memorial Award
- Practice: Ian Begg Architect

Ian McKerron Begg (23 June 1925 – 26 November 2017) was a Scottish architect, known for his work with Scottish castles and their restoration. He attended the Edinburgh College of Art and he served in World War II; he trained with the United States Navy to become a pilot in the Royal Navy's Fleet Air Arm.

Begg led the restoration of many castles including Muckrach Castle. He also built his own tower house castle which was completed in 1992. He named the tower house "Ravens' Craig" and it is four storeys tall. He has served as an adviser for the National Trust for Scotland and vice president of the Architectural Heritage Society of Scotland.

== Early life ==
Begg was born in Kirkcaldy, Scotland on 23 June 1925. He went to Kirkcaldy High School and then Edinburgh College of Art. He served in the Second World War, having spent one year at Glasgow University Naval Division, before training with the United States Navy to become a pilot in the Fleet Air Arm. When he was 22, he completed a 135-mile (217 km) trek around Scotland. In 1951, Begg apprenticed with Harry Hubbard in Kirkcaldy before joining Neil and Hurd Architects firm in Edinburgh.

== Career ==
He became the sole partner of Neil and Hurd Architects in 1963 when Robert Hurd died. The firm merged with another company in 1965, and Begg stayed until 1983. In the early 1970s, Begg also presented programmes on BBC Television on "The Scottish House". In 1984, he set up the Ian Begg Architect company with Raymond Muszynski as a partner because he felt that his previous company had become too large. He left the company in 2000, which was then renamed Né Begg and it became Morris and Steedman Associates in 2002.

Begg was interim director of the Edinburgh New Town Conservation Committee when it was formed in 1971, interim director of the Edinburgh Old Town Committee for Conservation and Renewal in 1984–1985, and an Adviser on Architecture for the Edinburgh Old Town Charitable Trust. He also taught architectural design, was an adviser for the National Trust for Scotland, and was vice president of the Architectural Heritage Society of Scotland. He retired in 2009.

=== Awards and honours ===
Begg was a Fellow of the Royal Incorporation of Architects in Scotland (FRIAS), member of the Society of Antiquaries of Scotland (FSAScot), Honorary Member of the Saltire Society, a Fellow of the Architectural Heritage Society of Scotland, and resigned from the Royal Institute of British Architects (RIBA) in 1984. In 2013, he won the Nigel Tranter Memorial Award.

== Castles and other buildings ==
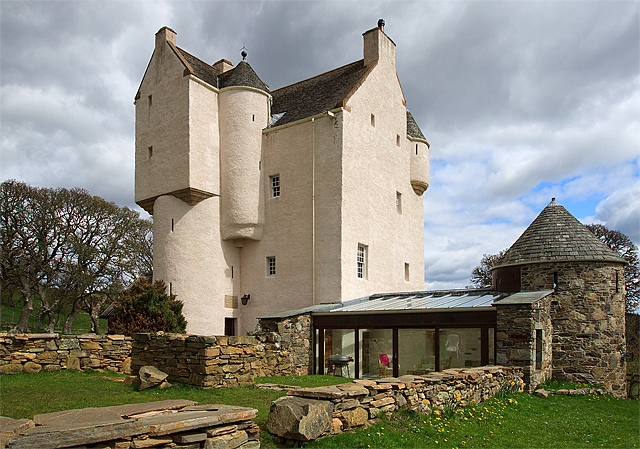
The restored Muckrach Castle

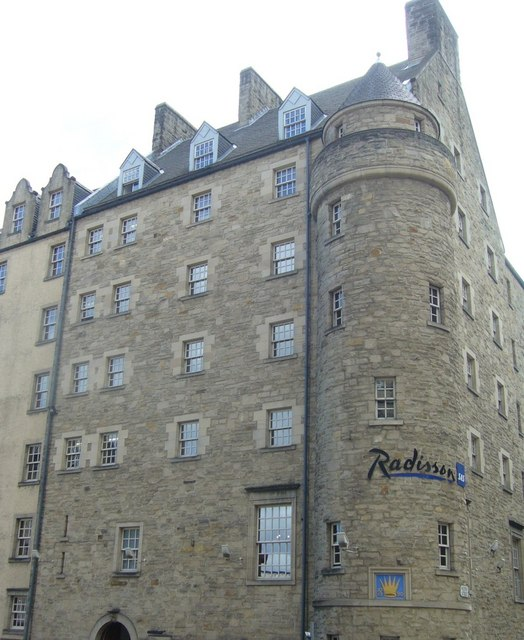
Scandic Crown Hotel, High Street, Edinburgh

Begg led the restoration of Muckrach Castle in 1978–1985. He said, "it was one of the high points in my life, as an architect". He has worked on the restoration of many other Scottish castles, such as Tillycairn Castle, Lauriston Castle, Aboyne Castle, and Dairsie Castle. He also designed and built other buildings, such as the St Mungo Museum of Comparative Religion at Glasgow Cathedral.

Begg designed the Scandic Crown Hotel, Edinburgh in 1988–1989. He later designed a faux-Scottish castle luxury hotel in China, complete with a winery and a great hall to sit 100 people.

=== Ravens' Craig ===
Ravens' Craig tower house castle in Plockton, Lochalsh was designed by Begg and built from the ground up and completed in 1992. It was so named in part because Begg was in Ravenscraig House when he was at school. It took 6 years to build and its layout is based on his experience working with other castles, but with some modern features like underfloor heating and a lift shaft to aid in bringing logs to the main hall. The main hall is 5 m (16 ft) by 7.27 m (23.9 ft), with the size dictated by a triangular pattern on the ceiling. The ground floor, where the dining room is located, is vaulted. It has living space on four storeys, with a circular staircase leading to bedrooms on the upper levels, said to be based on a Francesco Borromini church in Rome (San Carlo alle Quattro Fontane). The Architectural Heritage Society of Scotland organised a tour of the tower house for about 50 people in 2010. The tower house was eventually listed for sale at over £725,000. and it was said to be one of his finest works. When asked why he decided to sell his home he told The Sunday Post,

"I'm 90 now and can no longer walk as well as I could. So we are moving into Plockton itself, two-and-a-half miles away. Then I will be able to walk to the pub and the shop. I'm sorry, up to a point, to leave but I have come to accept change is necessary."

== Personal life ==
He was married to his first wife Agnes and they had two children. They had a daughter and a son; their son died in 1990. Ian had two daughters with a partner named Lennox Savage. He then married Ruth née Fisken and became a stepfather to her daughter Lisa. In his 2017 obituary, it was noted that he had two grandchildren.

Begg retired from architectural work in December 2009. After retirement, he continued to write about historical subjects. In 2015, he wrote about Scottish neolithic carved stone balls. Begg died on 26 November 2017 and is buried in Balmacara Cemetery.
