= Geraldine Somerville =

Irish actress

- Born: Geraldine Margaret Agnew-Somerville; 19 May 1967 (age 59); County Meath, Ireland
- Education: Guildhall School of Music and Drama
- Occupation: Actress
- Years active: 1985–present
- Spouse: William Osborne-Young (m. 1995)
- Children: 3

Geraldine Margaret Agnew-Somerville (born 19 May 1967) is an Irish actress. She is known for her roles in the film Gosford Park (2001) and the Harry Potter film series as an adult Lily Potter (2001–2011). Her other roles have included Daphne (2007), My Week with Marilyn (2011) and Grace of Monaco (2014). In 1995, Somerville was nominated for a BAFTA Award for playing Jane Penhaligon in the television series Cracker.

== Early life ==
Somerville was born in County Meath on 19 May 1967, the second child of Sir Quentin Charles Agnew-Somerville, 2nd Baronet (1929–2010), a Naval officer and insurance consultant, and his wife Margaret April Irene (née Drummond), daughter of the 15th Baron Strange. She has two siblings. When Somerville was six, the family moved to the Isle of Man; from the age of eight, she attended the Arts Educational School, Tring (now Tring Park School for the Performing Arts), a private boarding school in Tring, Hertfordshire, where, having originally studied ballet, she first developed an interest in acting. At sixteen, she left the school to continue her studies in London, before gaining a place at the Guildhall School of Music and Drama, graduating in 1988.

== Career ==
Somerville's early television roles include guest roles in Poirot, Casualty and The Bill. In 1991, she starred as Biddy Millican in The Black Velvet Gown, an ITV production based on the 1984 novel by Catherine Cookson. The film was watched by 12.8 million viewers, and received an International Emmy Award for Drama. In that same year, she made her film debut in Stephen Poliakoff's Close My Eyes in a supporting role. In 1993, she was cast as DS Jane "Panhandle" Penhaligon in crime drama Cracker, written by Jimmy McGovern. The critically acclaimed series starred Robbie Coltrane as the eponymous criminal psychologist, and went on to win seven TV BAFTAs; Somerville gained a Best Actress nomination for her performance in 1995. That year also saw the release of Haunted, a horror film directed by veteran filmmaker Lewis Gilbert, in which she played Kate McCarrick. In 1994, she appeared in two episodes of Performance, a BBC2 anthology series which originally aired between 1991 and 1998, broadcasting productions of both classic and contemporary plays: Somerville played Ann Welch in The Deep Blue Sea, and Miss Julie in After Miss Julie. In 1996, she featured in sports drama True Blue, which recounted the events of the 1987 Oxford-Cambridge boat race. The film was selected to be screened at the Royal Film Performance, attended by Queen Elizabeth II.

In 1998, Somerville starred as Olivia in romantic comedy Jilting Joe, opposite James Purefoy. Also that year, she played Louisa Stockbridge in Gosford Park, a satirical comedy drama set in an English country house in the 1930s. The film was written by Julian Fellowes and directed by Robert Altman; it went on to be nominated for nine BAFTAs and seven Academy Awards, winning Best Original Screenplay. Somerville and the cast also received five awards for Best Ensemble, including a Screen Actors Guild award. In 1999, Somerville portrayed Lady Emily Lennox in BBC period drama series Aristocrats, based on Stella Tillyard's biography of the lives and loves of the four Lennox sisters. The series was nominated for Best Drama and Best Costume Design at the Irish Film and Television Awards, and received two nominations from the Royal Television Society for its costumes and makeup. She played Val McArdle in four episodes of Daylight Robbery, an ITV crime drama series about four Essex housewives struggling with personal and domestic problems. In 2001, she made her first appearance as Lily Potter in Harry Potter and the Philosopher's Stone, a role she would go on to reprise in all eight films in the franchise. In 2002, Somerville played trauma psychologist Dr. Sam Graham in television film The Safe House; she also appeared in an episode of Murder in Mind, an anthology series created by Anthony Horowitz, featuring self-contained stories with a murderous theme, seen from the perspective of the killer. In 2005, she featured in an episode of period crime drama series Jericho as Fiona Hewitt. In 2006, she played Alice Barrie in biographical comedy-drama Sixty Six.

In 2007, Somerville starred as best-selling novelist Daphne du Maurier in biographical drama Daphne, adapted from the authorised biography by Margaret Forster. The film aired on 12 May on BBC2, and co-starred Janet McTeer as Gertrude Lawrence and Elizabeth McGovern as Ellen Doubleday, the object of du Maurier's unrequited affections. Later that year, she appeared in The Inspector Lynley Mysteries as DS Michelle Tate. In 2008, Somerville played the grieving mother of a murdered child in three episodes of ITV thriller The Children. In 2010, she played Fiona Douglas in sci-fi drama Survivors, a BBC series about a group of people battling for survival on a post-apocalyptic Earth after a devastating influenza epidemic. In 2012, Somerville starred in ITV drama series Titanic as Louisa, Countess of Manton, a fictional passenger travelling on its ill-fated maiden voyage. The series was created by Julian Fellowes to mark the 100th anniversary of the disaster. In the same year, she also appeared in short film The Girl, which saw her nominated for Best Supporting Actress at the Madrid International Film Festival.

In 2014, she appeared in three films: British drama The Riot Club, sci-fi action film Autómata, and Grace Kelly biopic Grace of Monaco, in which she portrayed Princess Antoinette, a member of the House of Grimaldi. She also appeared in two episodes of Quirke, a British-Irish crime drama miniseries, adapted by Andrew Davies from the Quirke novels by John Banville. In 2015, Somerville played Assistant Commissioner Cynthia Kline in long-running police procedural New Tricks. The following year, she appeared in two episodes of Silent Witness as Lydia Hamilton. In 2017, Somerville portrayed Joyce Tennison, mother of Jane Tennison, in Prime Suspect 1973, a prequel covering Tennison's early years as a WPC within the Metropolitan Police Service. That same year, she featured in A.A. Milne biopic Goodbye Christopher Robin and comedy film The Hippopotamus, adapted from the novel by Stephen Fry. In 2018, she played Ruth Palmer in four episodes of Channel 4 cyber thriller Kiss Me First. In 2019, Somerville appeared as Lady McLeod in Christmas-themed romantic comedy television film Christmas in the Highlands, and as Lady Pressfield in action comedy The Gentlemen, directed by Guy Ritchie. In 2023, she appeared in erotic thriller Fair Play, opposite Phoebe Dynevor.

== Theatre ==
Somerville made her professional stage debut at Manchester's Royal Exchange Theatre in 1989, playing Laura Wingfield in The Glass Menagerie by Tennessee Williams; The Stage newspaper described her as "someone to watch out for". She was nominated for a Manchester Evening News Theatre Award for her performance. In 1990, she starred as Antoinette in More Than One Antoinette at the Young Vic, a role inspired by the character of Bertha Rochester in Jane Eyre. She then appeared in three productions at the Bristol Old Vic, including a leading role as Juliet in Shakespeare's Romeo and Juliet in 1992. In 1996, she made her first appearance at the National Theatre in a stage adaptation of Dennis Potter's 1979 television play Blue Remembered Hills. She also starred as Nora in a Birmingham Repertory Theatre production of Ibsen's A Doll's House.

In 1998, Somerville played Dee in I Am Yours at the Royal Court Theatre. The following year, she performed again at the National Theatre in Remember This, written by Stephen Poliakoff and directed by Ron Daniels. In 2003, she made her third National appearance at the Cottesloe Theatre in Power, a drama by Nick Dear set during the reign of Louis XIV's, with Somerville playing Henriette d'Angleterre, youngest daughter of Charles I. In 2010, she appeared in Serenading Louie at the Donmar Warehouse. In 2018, she starred in Checkpoint Chana at the Finborough Theatre. In 2022, thirty-three years after her original debut, Somerville returned to the Royal Exchange Theatre in The Glass Menagerie, this time in the role of Amanda Wingfield, receiving praise for her "astonishing" performance. An earlier planned 2020 production had been postponed owing to the COVID-19 pandemic. The production, directed by Atri Banerjee, earned positive reviews from critics, with The Daily Telegraph calling it "powerfully heart-wrenching".

In 2024, Somerville reprised her role as Amanda Wingfield in The Glass Menagerie, reuniting her with director Atri Banerjee. The new production opened at the Belgrade Theatre, Coventry in March, before moving to the Malvern Festival Theatre, Rose Theatre Kingston, Bristol Old Vic and Theatre Royal Bath, finishing its run at the Alexandra Palace Theatre in June. The production was well received by critics, who praised its "outstanding cast" and credited it with "fully revitalising" Williams's play; The Stage described it as "a striking interpretation", whilst the Daily Express called it "an exquisite production".

== Personal life ==
Somerville married stockbroker William Osbourne-Young in 1995, and they have three children.

== Filmography ==
=== Film ===
Year	Film	Role	Notes
1991	Close My Eyes	Natalie's Boss	
1991	Augustine	Augustine	Short film
1994	A Business Affair	Saleswoman	
1995	Haunted	Kate	
1996	True Blue	Ruth McDonald	
1998	Jilting Joe	Olivia	
2001	Harry Potter and the Philosopher's Stone	Lily Potter	
2001	Gosford Park	Louisa Stockbridge	
2002	Re-inventing Eddie	Jeanie Harris	
2002	Harry Potter and the Chamber of Secrets	Lily Potter	Uncredited role
2004	Harry Potter and the Prisoner of Azkaban	Lily Potter	
2005	Harry Potter and the Goblet of Fire	Lily Potter	
2006	Sixty Six	Alice Barrie	
2007	Harry Potter and the Order of the Phoenix	Lily Potter	
2009	Harry Potter and the Half-Blood Prince	Lily Potter	
2010	Harry Potter and the Deathly Hallows – Part 1	Lily Potter	
2011	Harry Potter and the Deathly Hallows – Part 2	Lily Potter	
2011	My Week with Marilyn	Lady Jane Clark	
2012	The Girl	Sophie	Short film
2014	Grace of Monaco	Princess Antoinette	
2014	The Riot Club	Miles' Mother	
2014	Autómata	Samantha	
2016	Kids in Love	Linda	
2017	The Hippopotamus	Rebecca Logan	
2017	Goodbye Christopher Robin	Lady O	
2018	Sydney	Jenny	Short film
2019	The Gentlemen	Lady Pressfield	
2023	Fair Play	Emily's Mother	
2023	Gorka	Tanya	Short film

=== Television ===
Year	Title	Role	Notes
1990	She-Play	Elizabeth	Episode: "Bathing Elizabeth"
1990	Casualty	Ruth	Episode: "All's Fair"
1991	The Black Velvet Gown	Biddy Millican	TV movie
1993	Agatha Christie's Poirot	Pauline Wetherby	Episode: "The Yellow Iris"
1993	The Bill	Marie Cousins	Episode: "Playing Away"
1993	Cracker	DS Jane Penhaligon	TV series (23 episodes: 1993–1995)
1994	Romeo & Juliet	Juliet	Television film
1994	Performance	Ann Welch/Miss Julie	TV series (2 episodes: 1994–1995)
1998	Heaven on Earth	Deborah Bennett	Television film
1998	The Canterbury Tales	Dorigen/Pertelote	Episode: "Leaving London"
1999	Aristocrats	Lady Emily Lennox	5 episodes
1999	Daylight Robbery	Val McArdle	4 episodes
2002	Murder in Mind	Angela Coates	Episode: "Disposal"
2002	The Safe House	Dr. Sam Graham	Television film
2005	Jericho	Fiona Hewitt	Episode: "To Murder and Create"
2007	Daphne	Daphne du Maurier	Television film
2007	The Inspector Lynley Mysteries	DS Michelle Tate	Episode: "Limbo"
2008	The Children	Sue	2 episodes
2010	Survivors	Fiona Douglas	3 episodes
2012	Titanic	Louisa, Countess of Manton	4 episodes
2012	Inspector George Gently	Alethea Blackstone	Episode: "Gently With Class"
2014	Quirke	Sarah	2 episodes
2015	New Tricks	Asst. Commissioner Cynthia Kline	2 episodes
2016	Silent Witness	Lydia Hamilton	Episode: "After The Fall"
2017	Prime Suspect 1973	Joyce Tennison	5 episodes
2018	Kiss Me First	Ruth Palmer	4 episodes
2019	Christmas in the Highlands	Lady McLeod	Television film

=== Video games ===
Year	Game	Role
2011	Harry Potter and the Deathly Hallows – Part 2	Lily Potter (voice)

== Awards and nominations ==
Year	Award	Category	Nominated work	Result	Ref
1995	British Academy Television Award	Best Actress	Cracker	Nominated	
2001	Awards Circuit Community Award	Best Cast Ensemble	Gosford Park	Nominated	
2002	Critics Choice Award	Best Acting Ensemble	Gosford Park	Won	
2002	Florida Film Critics Circle Award	Best Ensemble Cast	Gosford Park	Won	
2002	Online Film Critics Society Award	Best Ensemble	Gosford Park	Won	
2002	Phoenix Film Critics Society Award	Best Acting Ensemble	Gosford Park	Nominated	
2002	Satellite Award	Outstanding Motion Picture Ensemble	Gosford Park	Won	
2002	Screen Actors Guild Award	Outstanding Performance by a Cast in a Motion Picture	Gosford Park	Won	
2013	Madrid International Film Festival Award	Best Supporting Actress	The Girl	Nominated	
