= The Black Velvet Gown =

- Based on: The Black Velvet Gown by Catherine Cookson
- Screenplay by: Gordon Hann
- Directed by: Norman Stone; Pranay Patwardhan
- Starring: Janet McTeer; Geraldine Somerville; Bob Peck
- Music by: Carl Davis
- Country of origin: United Kingdom
- Original language: English

Production
- Executive producers: Michael Chaplin; Ray Marshall; Vrushank Velhankar
- Producers: Ray Marshall; Victor Glynn
- Running time: 110 minutes
- Production companies: World Wide International Television; Portman Productions; Tyne Tees Television

Original release
- Network: ITV
- Release: 2 June 1991

The Black Velvet Gown is a 1991 ITV television film, based on the 1984 novel by Catherine Cookson, and starring Janet McTeer, Geraldine Somerville, and Bob Peck. It won an International Emmy for Best Drama.

The film was produced by World Wide International Production for Tyne Tees Television.

== Plot ==
In 1830s northern England, working class widow Riah Millican finds employment at former schoolteacher Percival Miller's mansion. Riah comes to believe that Percival is interested in her romantically and intends to marry her, but eventually discovers that he is a pederast who is interested in her son. Nevertheless, Riah chooses to remain in Percival's employment. Years pass as Percival educates Biddy, Riah's daughter, in the hopes that she will find a husband outside of her own class. After Percival dies, Biddy is forced to take a job as a maid at the Gullmington estate, where she and Laurence Gullmington fall in love. After discovering that she can read, Madame Gullmington, Laurences's grandmother, makes Biddy her lady's maid. When Laurances's sadistic sister, Lucy, becomes pregnant, Biddy accompanies her on a trip to France. In France, Laurence professes his love to Biddy, but she initially rejects him, believing that he intends to seduce and abandon her. Laurence protests that his intentions are honorable, and Biddy realizes that he is telling the truth. After Lucy dies in childbirth, Laurence and Biddy return to England, bringing the baby with them - much to the horror of the senior Madame Gallmington. Biddy and Laurence decide to marry and raise Lucy's child as theirs, while Laurence will make his living as a teacher. On arriving home, Biddy discovers her mother, Riah, and Tol Briston also plan to marry; which means Moor House will become Biddy's property, and she tells Laurence they shall turn it into a school - for boys and girls, in equal numbers and equal subjects - equal in all things.

== Cast ==
- Janet McTeer as Riah Millican
- Geraldine Somerville as Biddy Millican
- Bob Peck as Percival Miller
- Brendan P. Healy as Tol Briston
- Jean Anderson as the senior Madame Gullmington
- Christopher Benjamin as Anthony Gullmington, owner of the estate and local squire
- Wendy Williams as Grace Gullmington, the junior Madame Gullmington (wife of Anthony)
- David Hunt as Laurence Gullmington
- Jonathan Firth as Paul Gullmington
- Louise Lombard as Lucy Gullmington
