= Bob Peck =

English actor (1945–1999)

- Peck as Ronald Craven in Edge of Darkness
- Born: Robert Peck; 23 August 1945; Leeds, West Riding of Yorkshire, England
- Died: 4 April 1999 (aged 53); Kingston upon Thames, London, England
- Occupation: Actor
- Years active: 1972–1999
- Spouse: Jill Baker (m. 1982)
- Children: 3
- Awards: BAFTA TV Award; Best Actor; 1986 Edge of Darkness

Robert "Bob" Peck (23 August 1945 – 4 April 1999) was an English actor whose 1985 performance in the British television serial Edge of Darkness won him the BAFTA TV Award for Best Actor. He was also known for his role as game warden Robert Muldoon in the 1993 film Jurassic Park, and was nominated for three Laurence Olivier Awards.

== Early life ==
Robert Peck was born into a working-class family in Leeds, West Riding of Yorkshire, on 23 August 1945. He attended Leeds Modern School in Lawnswood, and performed with the National Youth Theatre for six weeks when he was 15. He then studied at Leeds College of Art, where he received a Diploma in Art and Design, and where he was involved in student amateur dramatics.

== Career ==
=== Stage career ===
Before breaking into film and television work, Peck was a regular actor with the Royal Shakespeare Company (RSC) with Ian McKellen, Donald Sinden and Judi Dench. Between 1979 and 1980 he played Iago alongside Donald Sinden in Othello, in both Stratford and London. He made a memorable appearance on stage in the RSC production of The Life and Adventures of Nicholas Nickleby, originally by Charles Dickens, playing two characters: the boisterous Yorkshireman John Browdie and the predatory Sir Mulberry Hawk, and repeated these roles on Broadway and when the production was filmed for television in 1982. He played the character of Macduff in Trevor Nunn's acclaimed 1976 stage and television versions of Macbeth, and re-appeared in another production of the play in 1982, this time playing Macbeth himself. According to Peck's fellow RSC performer and veteran McKellen, Peck is the actor he considers he "learned the most from".

=== Edge of Darkness ===
Peck's television career began in the 1970s, with his first television roles being in the BBC's Thirty-Minute Theatre anthology series in 1972, in which he appeared in the episode "Bypass". He also appeared in various other successful television productions such as Z-Cars and Play for Today. He also appeared in the films Royal Flash and Parker.

In 1985 television writer Troy Kennedy Martin - who had previously written the screenplay for the film The Italian Job and created the popular police procedural television series Z-Cars (in which Peck had appeared during the 1970s) - cast Peck in the starring role of policeman Ronald Craven in his television miniseries Edge of Darkness. This crime drama/political thriller follows Peck's character as he attempts to unravel the truth behind the murder of his daughter, portrayed in the series by Joanne Whalley. Another of Peck's co-stars in the series was American actor Joe Don Baker, along with fellow British actors Charles Kay and Ian McNeice.

The series was broadcast on BBC Two in six episodes from 4 November to 9 December 1985. During its run the show attracted four million viewers and spiralled Peck to fame, winning him a British Academy Television Award for Best Actor at the British Academy of Film and Television Arts Awards. After the series ended, Peck had become a figure of popularity and a national favourite.

=== Film success ===
After gaining popularity for his starring role in Edge of Darkness, Peck began appearing in films. After a few theatre appearances, Peck made his first appearance as a main character in a film again playing a policeman, John Graham, based in Kenya in 1950, who takes under his wing the son of a murdered black priest in the 1987 film The Kitchen Toto. He also appeared in the 1987 film On the Black Hill, adapted from the 1982 novel of the same name by Bruce Chatwin. The role which really launched his career as a film actor was his portrayal of the android Byron, in the post-apocalyptic science-fiction adventure film Slipstream (1989), in which he appeared alongside Mark Hamill, Bill Paxton, F. Murray Abraham, Ben Kingsley and Robbie Coltrane. During the late 1980s, he also appeared in television shows including The Storyteller, The Jim Henson Hour and Screen One.

Peck also voiced all the male characters in the children's live action TV series combined with stop motion animation, Forget Me Not Farm on the BBC in 1990.

Peck's image and popularity increased with appearances in films including the 1990 film Lord of the Flies as the (unnamed) marine officer. He also appeared in Screen Two, Screenplay and A TV Dante, as well as in the television films, The Black Velvet Gown and An Ungentlemanly Act. In 1993, Peck made his biggest film appearance, when he was cast as park gamekeeper Robert Muldoon in the blockbuster smash hit Jurassic Park.

After appearing in Jurassic Park, Peck appeared in the television show The Young Indiana Jones Chronicles (1993) playing General Targo in one episode. He also played Italian Romantic composer Giuseppe Verdi in Verdi, a television film documenting the life of the composer.

=== Later years ===
In the later years of his life and career, Peck appeared in more films, portraying the roles of Captain Sebastian Belger in Merisairas, Françoise's father in Surviving Picasso, Ravn in Smilla's Sense of Snow, Harry Briggs in FairyTale: A True Story and Denton (based on Lancelot Dent) in the film The Opium War (Chinese: 鸦片战争; pinyin: yapian zhanzheng). He also appeared in the direct-to-TV film The Scold's Bridle (1998).

In 2000, a year following Peck's death from cancer, the stop-motion animated film The Miracle Maker, was released, in which Peck voiced the character of Joseph of Arimathea. The film was dedicated to Peck's memory.

== Awards ==
| Year | Award | Category | Work | Result | Ref. |
|---|---|---|---|---|---|
| 1980 | Laurence Olivier Awards | Actor of the Year in a Revival | Othello | Nominated | |
| 1983 | Laurence Olivier Awards | Actor of the Year in a Revival | King Lear | Nominated | |
| 1986 | British Academy Television Awards | Best Actor | Edge of Darkness | Won | |
| 1995 | Laurence Olivier Awards | Best Actor | Rutherford and Son | Nominated | |

== Personal life ==
Peck and actress Jill Baker were married for 17 years, from 1982 until his death, in 1999. They had three children: Hannah (born 1983), George (born 1986), and Milly (born 1990).

=== Death ===
In November 1994, Peck was diagnosed with an undisclosed type of cancer. He was said to be undergoing chemotherapy and radiotherapy and his agent claimed that he was making a recovery, but he died at his home in Kingston upon Thames, London, on 4 April 1999, at the age of 53. His funeral took place in London, and his close friend and Edge of Darkness co-star Ian McNeice read a eulogy at the service. He was cremated in London and his ashes were given to his family.

== Filmography ==
| Year | Title | Role | Notes |
|---|---|---|---|
| 1975 | Royal Flash | Police Inspector | |
| 1982 | Lear | Lear | |
| 1984 | Parker | Rohl | |
| 1987 | The Kitchen Toto | John Graham | |
| 1988 | On the Black Hill | Amos Jones | |
| 1989 | Slipstream | Byron | |
| 1989 | Surgikill | Patient | |
| 1990 | Ladder of Swords | Detective Inspector Atherton | |
| 1990 | Lord of the Flies | Marine Officer | |
| 1993 | Jurassic Park | Robert Muldoon | |
| 1996 | Merisairas | Captain Sebastian Belger | |
| 1996 | Surviving Picasso | Françoise's father | |
| 1997 | Smilla's Sense of Snow | Ravn | |
| 1997 | The Opium War | Denton | |
| 1997 | FairyTale: A True Story | Harry Briggs | |
| 1999 | The Miracle Maker | Joseph of Arimathea | Posthumous release Voice (final film role) |

== Television ==
| Year | Title | Role | Notes |
|---|---|---|---|
| 1972 | Thirty-Minute Theatre | Moore | Episode: "Bypass" |
| 1974 | Z-Cars | Clive Parsons | Episode: "Waste" |
| 1975 | Second City Firsts | Reg | Episode: "Waiting at the Field Gate" |
| 1975-1981 | Play for Today | Bertram/Joe Pike | 2 episodes |
| 1979 | A Performance of Macbeth | Macduff | |
| 1981 | The Three Sisters | Solyony | |
| 1981 | Bavarian Night | Joe Pike | |
| 1982 | The Life and Adventures of Nicholas Nickleby | John Browdie/Sir Mulberry Hawk | Miniseries |
| 1984 | Bird of Prey 2 | Greggory | Miniseries |
| 1985 | Edge of Darkness | Ronald Craven | Television miniseries BAFTA TV Award for Best Actor |
| 1986 | The Disputation | Pablo Christiani | TV film |
| 1987-1990 | Screen Two | James Westgate/John | 2 episodes |
| 1988 | The Storyteller | Soldier | Episode: "The Soldier and Death" |
| 1989 | The Owl's Legacy | Narrator | |
| 1990 | Who Bombed Birmingham? | Chief Superintendent Tom Meffen | TV film |
| 1990 | ScreenPlay | Tudor Barbu | Episode: "Shoot the Revolution" |
| 1990 | Centrepoint | Armstrong | Miniseries |
| 1990 | Forget Me Not Farm | Dandelion and Burdock the Crows, Portly the Pig, Topper Tank | |
| 1991 | A TV Dante | Dante | Miniseries |
| 1991 | The Black Velvet Gown | Percival Miller | TV film |
| 1991 | The War That Never Ends | Nicias | TV film |
| 1992 | An Ungentlemanly Act | Major Mike Norman | TV film |
| 1992 | Natural Lies | Andrew Fell | Miniseries |
| 1992 | Children of the Dragon | Dr Will Flint | Miniseries |
| 1993 | The Young Indiana Jones Chronicles | General Tango | Episode: "Transylvania, January 1918" |
| 1994 | Verdi | Giuseppe Verdi | TV film |
| 1994 | Hard Times | Thomas Gradgrind | Miniseries |
| 1996 | The Merchant of Venice | Shylock | TV film |
| 1997 | Deadly Summer | Donald Harcourt | TV film |
| 1997 | Hospital! | Harley Benson | TV film |
| 1998 | The Scold's Bridle | Detective Sergeant Cooper | Miniseries |
