= A TV Dante =

- Genre: Experimental
- Created by: Peter Greenaway; Tom Phillips
- Starring: John Gielgud; Bob Peck; Joanne Whalley-Kilmer
- Country of origin: United Kingdom
- Original language: English
- No. of seasons: 1
- No. of episodes: 4

Production
- Running time: 22 minutes

Original release
- Network: Channel 4
- Release: 29 July – 1 August 1990

A TV Dante is a 1990 mini-series directed by Tom Phillips and Peter Greenaway. It covers eight of the 34 cantos in Dante Alighieri's Inferno, part of his 14th century epic poem Divine Comedy.

Peter Greenaway and Tom Phillips won the Prix Italia for A TV Dante, their ambitious project to produce a video version of Dante's Inferno. Greenaway was first inspired by artist Tom Phillips’ illustrated translation of the work and they collaborated on this, the first eight Cantos of the work, using all the state-of-the-art technological resources available to the electronic media at the time. The eight Cantos of the film are not conventionally dramatised, rather they are illuminated with layered and juxtaposed imagery and a soundtrack which comments, counterpoints and clarifies. There are visual footnotes delivered by relevant expert authorities, and these often perform the function of narration as well as illustration. The result is a video journey through Dante's underworld.

A TV Dante was continued in 1991 through a further six of the Cantos, 9 through 14, by Chilean director Raoul Ruiz.

Starring John Gielgud, Bob Peck and Joanne Whalley-Kilmer.

== Prizes ==
- Winner: Special Prize Prix Italia
- Winner: Festival International du Nouveau Cinema el de LA Video
- Winner: Finalist Award - New York International Film and TV Festival

== Press quotes ==
- "A dazzling and inventive piece of video-image making...an eye-stitching use of television." - The Guardian
- "Nothing quite like it has been seen on television before. The extraordinary, multi-layered images on the screen are not so much state-of-the-art video but the state after that." - The Times
- "That rare and beautiful thing, an attempt to do something new with the medium." - The Observer
