= Freddie Boath =

English actor

- Born: Frederick William Boath; 6 May 1991 (age 35); Hammersmith, London, England
- Occupation: Actor
- Years active: 2000–2013

Frederick William Boath (born 6 May 1991) is an English actor best known for his role as Alex O'Connell in The Mummy Returns (2001). He now works as a marketing and advertising professional.

== Career ==
Boath was going to audition for Harry Potter and the Philosopher's Stone, but chose to audition for The Mummy Returns instead. He was replaced for the role of Alex O'Connell for the third movie in The Mummy trilogy by Australian actor Luke Ford.

Boath appeared in an ITV1 show called The Children. He played 14-year-old Jack, a troubled teenager; he said he could relate to the character as his parents divorced when he was young. In 2010 he played King Henry II as a teenager in The Pillars of the Earth.

Boath appeared as Benji Reed in the 2013 television series House of Anubis.

Boath graduated from Oxford Brookes University with a Bachelor of Arts, and completed an internship at London's The Red Brick Road, an advertising agency.

== Filmography ==
=== Films ===
Year	Title	Role	Notes
2001	The Mummy Returns	Alex O'Connell	
2012	Nomad	The Contact	Short film

=== Television ===
Year	Title	Role	Notes
2003	Rosemary and thyme	Roderick -a boy	“the invisible worm” - episode
2008	The Children	Jack Miller	3 episodes
2009	The Bill	Stevo Grainger	Episode: "Old Habits"
2010	Doctors	Barney Howerd	Episode: "Dead Weird"
2010	The Pillars of the Earth	Henry (15 years old)	
2013	House of Anubis	Benji Reed	4 episodes

== Awards and nominations ==
Year	Nominated work	Award	Category	Result	Ref.
2002	The Mummy Returns	Saturn Awards	Best Performance by a Younger Actor	Nominated	
2002	The Mummy Returns	Young Artist Award	Best Performance in a Feature Film: Supporting Young Actor	Nominated	
