= Dulnain Bridge =

Coordinates: 57.3045°N 3.6651°W

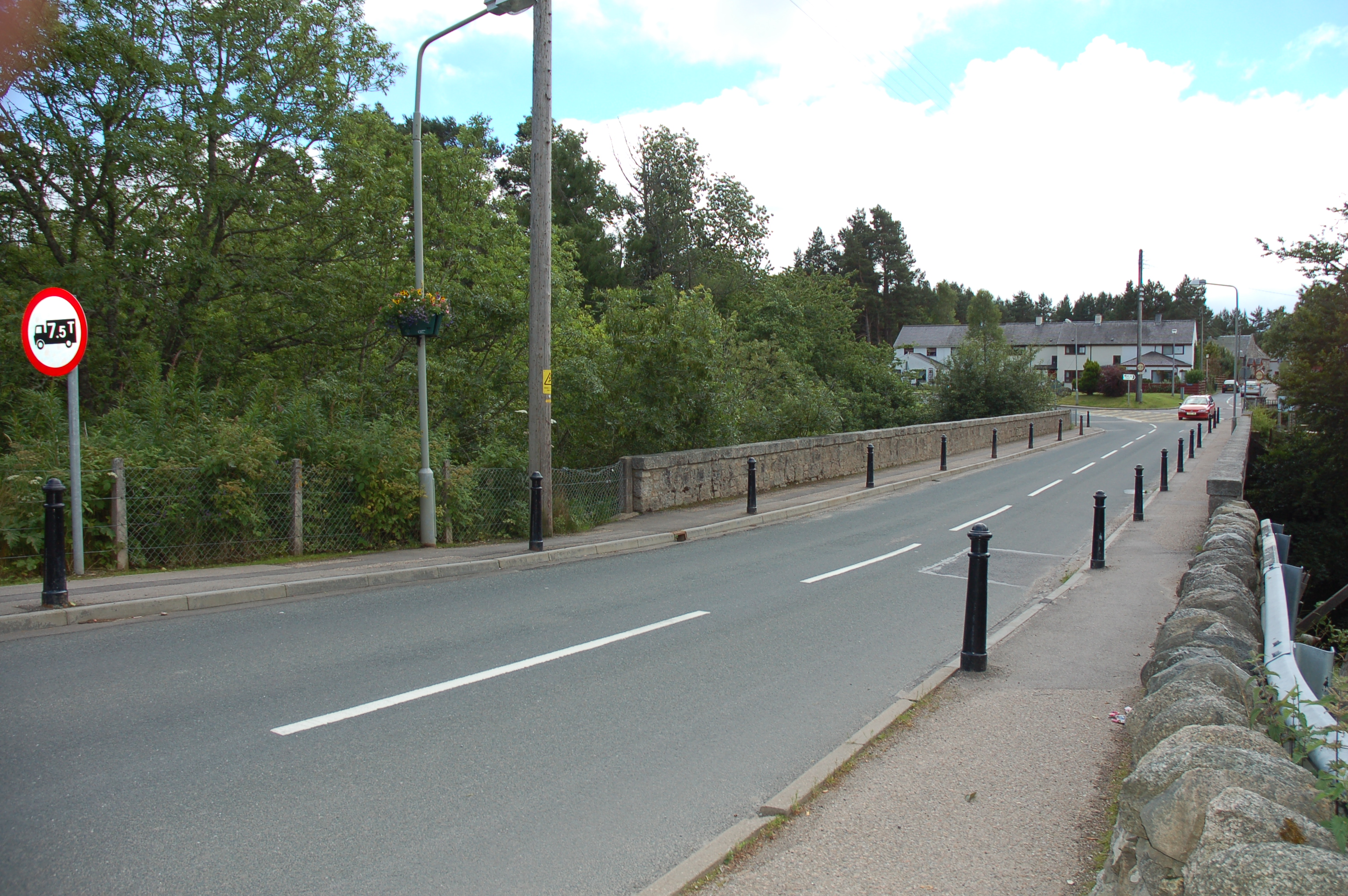
- The Dulnain Bridge

- Location within the Badenoch and Strathspey area
- Population: 129 (2001 Census)
- OS grid reference: NH995245
- Council area: Highland
- Country: Scotland
- Sovereign state: United Kingdom
- Post town: Grantown-on-Spey
- Postcode district: PH26
- Dialling code: 01479
- Police: Scotland
- Fire: Scottish
- Ambulance: Scottish

Dulnain Bridge (Scottish Gaelic: Drochaid Thulnain) is a village in Strathspey, next to the meeting of the River Dulnain and the River Spey, three miles south-west of Grantown-on-Spey, in the Scottish Highlands and the Highland council area.

== History ==
The bridge was swept away in a flood in 1829, but was re-built. The population is estimated at less than two hundred, and the surrounding area is popular with tourists, as it is surrounded by mountains. The traditional counties of Inverness-shire and Morayshire are separated by the bridge, which has existed for centuries.

The village lies near to the A95, in the Cairngorms National park. The village comprises two communities. Dulnain Bridge itself is centred to the north of the bridge, and this particular part of the village lies in Morayshire. The crofting community of Skye-of-Curr stretches for a mile to the south, and this is in Inverness-shire.

== Attractions ==
There is one hotel: Tigh-na-Sgaith. The village hall and church are located on the main road in Dulnain Bridge, next to the village shop and garage. On the other side of the main road is the river, with Dulnain Bridge over it. On the other side of the bridge is a park and children's playground.

There are several golf courses in the area around Dulnain Bridge, including the Boat of Garten course.

Archie is a highland cow who resides in the front field at Muckrach Country House. He has made a picture-postcard setting for nearly ten years.

=== Antiquated Farm Machinery Project ===
In the north of the village and next to the roches moutonnees (see above), is the display of farm machinery, This was the conception of George Rae Manager of Ballintomb Farm, Muckrach Estate. It was designed to enhance the road into the village from the east as a task set by his employer for the Year 2000. Working along with Tom Goss, the then Community Council Chairman, the land, dykestone and some of the antiquated machinery was acquired from Muckrach estate. The project was adopted by the Dulnain Bridge & Vicinity Community Council. It features farming machinery that has been used for decades in the fields around the Dulnain Bridge area.

The council describe it as a 'collection of implements from a bygone age' and the machinery is donated by local residents. Moray, Badenoch and Strathspey Enterprise assisted the creation of the project.

=== Strathspey Railway ===
Dulnain Bridge is the current terminus of the famous Strathspey Railway, a steam train that runs to Broomhill (Dulnain Bridge) through part of the Highlands from Aviemore and a whole trip takes around an hour and a half, and is run primarily by volunteers. The society has plans to extend the railway beyond Broomhill to Grantown on Spey, another 4 miles north, and so to provide a service for locals as well as tourists.

=== Historical attractions ===
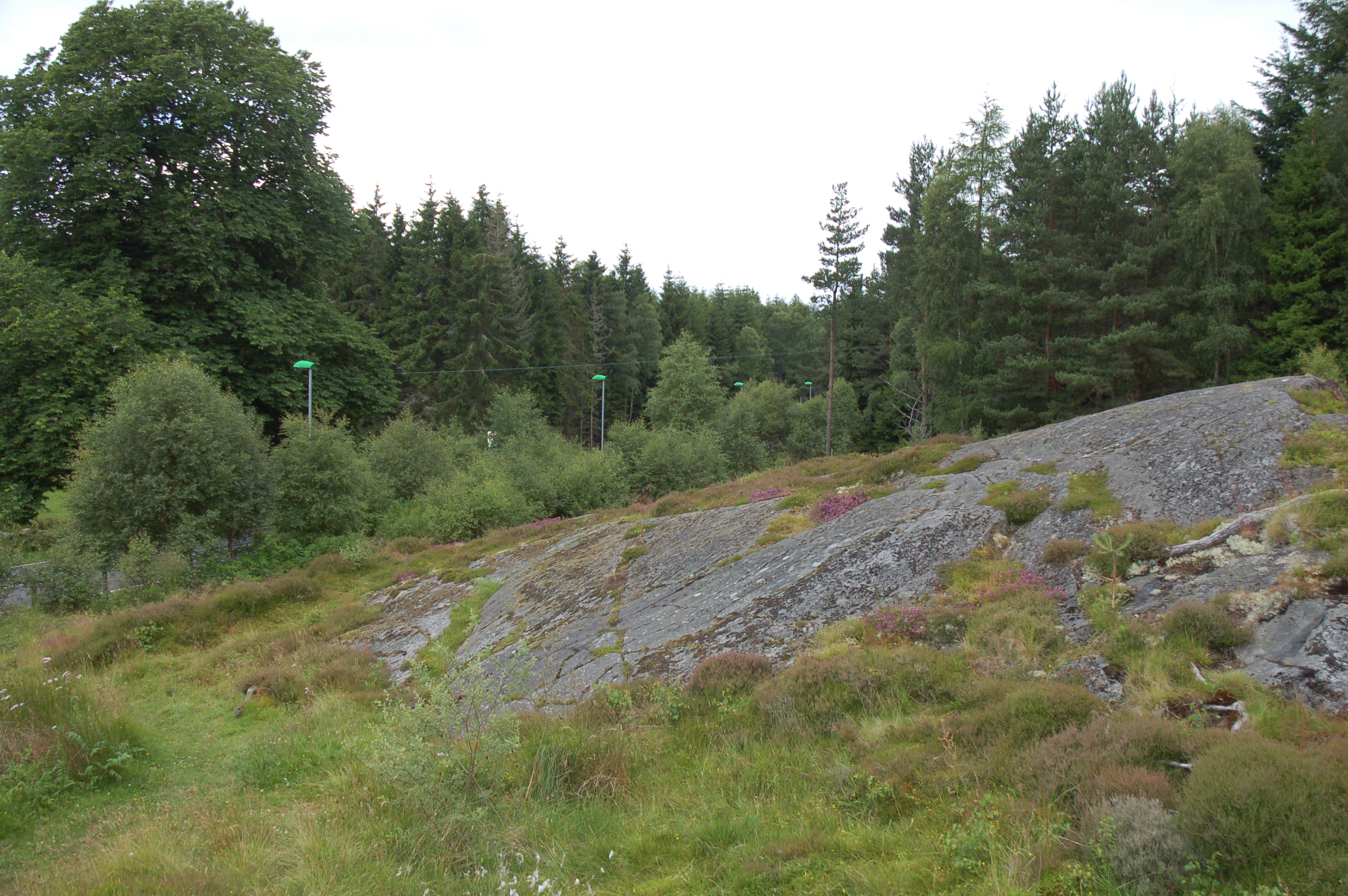
Roches Moutonnees

There are Pictish carved stones nearby and two Stone Age coffins were found in the 1880s in a burial cairn in Curr Wood.

At the north end of the village sit a display of glaciated rocks called the roche moutonnées. Around 18,000 years ago Dulnain Bridge was covered by a sheet of glacier ice. As the ice moved along it ground down and shaped the rock. As the ice melted, it left smooth, exposed rock in some places and a mixture of boulder and clay in other areas.

Muckrach Castle is also nearby.

== 2007 Protest ==
In 2007, nearly two hundred people from Dulnain Bridge and more from the surrounding area gathered to watch or take part in a protest march from the Dulnain Bridge village hall, across the bridge and through much of the village, before returning to the village hall. The protest took place on 5 July 2007.

The march was the result of a number of villagers' concerns about Dulnain Bridge's absence on official tourist literature and maps. The village was compared to fictional village Brigadoon, a story about a village that appears just once every one hundred years. Organisers of the march spoke of how they thought Dulnain Bridge disappears from people's minds. The march was to raise awareness of the village.

The march was the start of a campaign to get Dulnain Bridge 'on the map'. "The problem for residents is that, like the mythical village of Brigadoon, Dulnain Bridge keeps disappearing from the map," opined one resident. Villagers were disappointed by the village's absence from the map of the Outsider Festival that took place in the Highlands.

== Notable personalities ==
The village has had a few well known residents including Charlie Whelan, who worked as an assistant to Gordon Brown for several years, before opting to move north.

== Wildlife ==
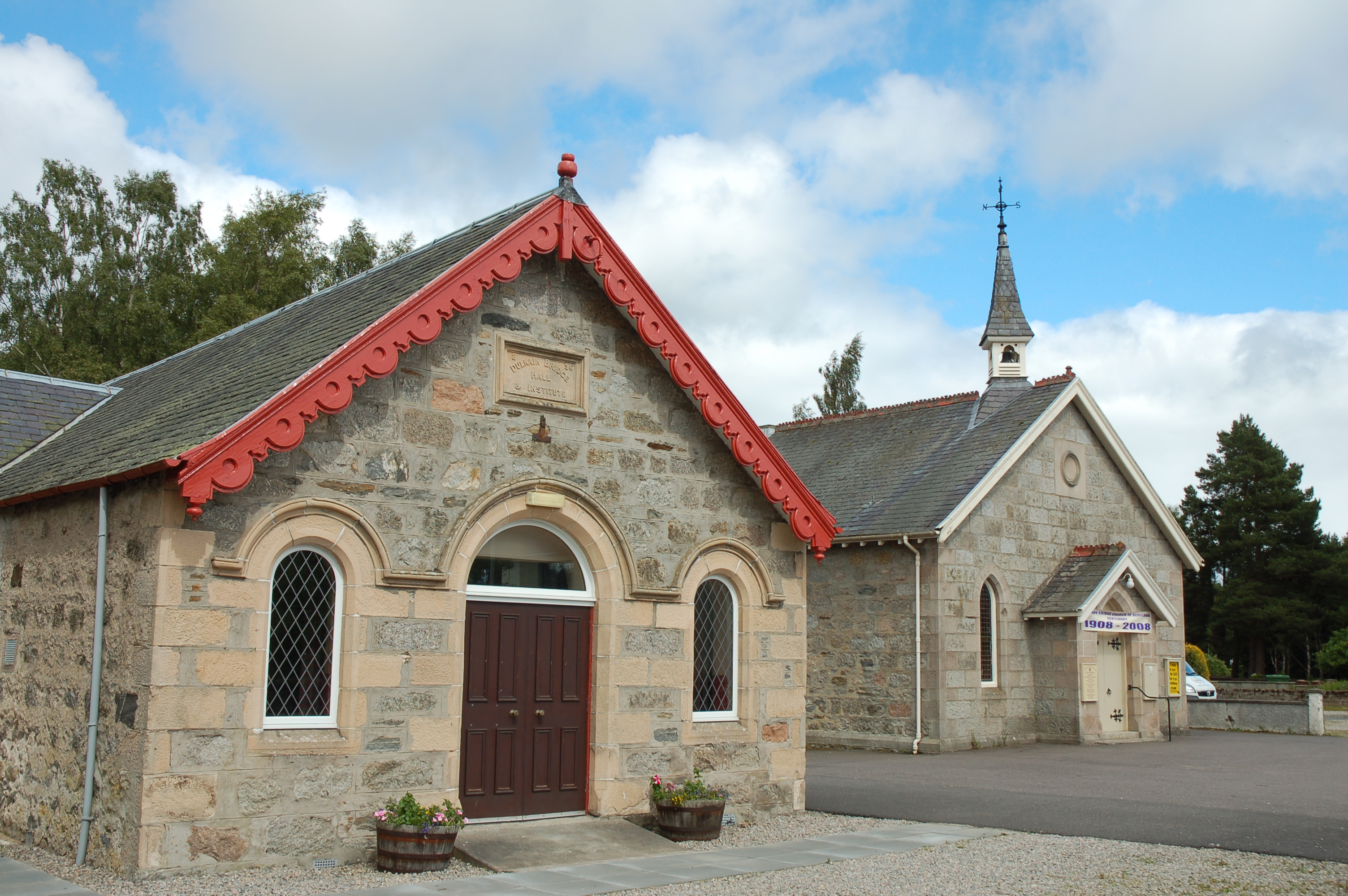
Village Hall (l) and Church (r)

The surrounding forests of Caledonian pines contain many rare species, including birds such as the endangered capercaillie and the main population of twinflower - Linnaea borealis is found in Curr Wood on the southern side of the village. There are Scottish crossbills, crested tits, buzzards, golden eagles and, most famously in the Dulnain Bridge area, ospreys. Red squirrels also reside in the woods.
