= The Children (TV series) =

- Genre: Crime drama Thriller
- Written by: Lucy Gannon
- Directed by: David Evans
- Starring: Kevin Whately; Geraldine Somerville; Ian Puleston-Davies; Lesley Sharp; Kate Ashfield
- Country of origin: United Kingdom
- Original language: English
- No. of series: 1
- No. of episodes: 3

Production
- Executive producer: Hilary Bevan Jones
- Producer: Tim Whitby
- Production location: United Kingdom
- Running time: 60 minutes
- Production company: Tightrope Pictures

Original release
- Network: ITV
- Release: 1 September – 15 September 2008

The Children is a three-part thriller first shown on ITV on 1 September 2008. Starring Kevin Whately and Geraldine Somerville, and written by Lucy Gannon, the story focuses on the murder of an eight-year-old girl, who is found on the patio of her home, and the subsequent investigation to discover which one of the adults who cared for her could have killed her. The series was released on DVD on 26 December 2008.

== Plot ==
The series centres on the dysfunctional lives of Cameron, Sue, Sue's daughter, Emily, Sue's ex-husband and DJ Paul, his new girlfriend Natasha, Cameron's ex-wife Anne and their son Jack. The main plot follows Cameron's family life at home, dealing with life living as a step family. The plot is told in a backwards flashback mode. Arguments and tensions rise throughout the story, and eventually, following her strange and naughty behaviour, little Emily is killed. Any one of the adults could have been responsible – and were all placed at the scene.

As the plot reaches its climax, Cameron is shown hitting Emily and accidentally smashing her through a glass patio door, however there is a twist to the tale as all the suspects are then seen killing her one by one – all except one of them. Natasha, the only character not seen killing Emily, is seen crying and sobbing whilst shouting "I'm sorry". This scene was particularly disliked by some critics, because viewers were not shown how or indeed why, or if, Natasha killed her. That, however, said the writer, was the crux of the drama, that any one of them could have, and that her position within her family had become so marginalized that she was, at times, perceived as a nuisance or problem by all of them.

== Cast ==
- Kevin Whately as Cameron Miller
- Geraldine Somerville as Sue Miller
- Ian Puleston-Davies as Paul Sutton
- Lesley Sharp as Anne Miller
- Kate Ashfield as Natasha Sutton
- Freddie Boath as Jack Miller
- Michael Begley as D.S. Bliss
- David Maybrick as D.C.I. Goodier
- Leanne Lakey as D.C. Morton
- Andrew Brooke as P.C. Warrior
- Pascale Burgess as P.C. Cardigan
- Karen Bryson as P.C. Yearsley
- Simon Trinder as P.C. Rook
- Sinead Michael as Emily

== Episodes ==
No.	Title	Directed by	Written by	British air date	UK viewers (million)
1	"Episode 1"	David Evans	Lucy Gannon	1 September 2008	5.45
2	"Episode 2"	David Evans	Lucy Gannon	8 September 2008	5.20
3	"Episode 3"	David Evans	Lucy Gannon	15 September 2008	5.17
