= Tilquhillie Castle =

Castle near Banchory in Aberdeenshire, Scotland

Coordinates: 57°02′15″N 2°27′36″W

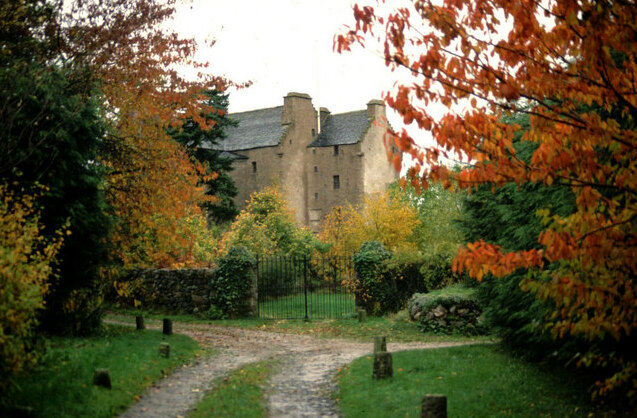
Tilquhillie Castle in October 1994

Tilquhillie Castle is a castle near Banchory in Aberdeenshire, Scotland. It is a Category A listed building.

The castle formerly formed part of the lands of Arbroath Abbey. The castle was built in 1576 by John Douglas of Tilquhillie and his wife Gelis Erskine, a daughter of John Erskine of Dun.

The Historic Environment Scotland listed-building report from 1972 described the castle as follows:

Modified Z plan tower house, four storeys with vaulted basement. Harl and slate, rounded and corbelled angles. Inset stone over door dated 1576. Deserted since 1948.

The castle was subsequently restored with modern amenities. The novelist and travel writer Norman Douglas spent part of his childhood at Tilquhillie Castle, the home of his paternal ancestors.

== See also ==
- Restoration of castles in Scotland
