= Anna Carteret =

British actress (born 1942)

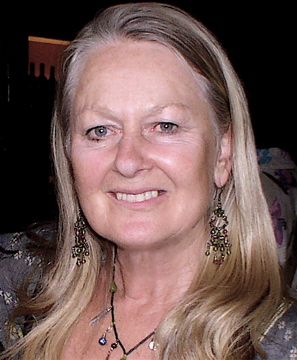
- Carteret at the Empty Space Awards, Young Vic Theatre in 2007
- Born: Annabelle Wilkinson; 11 December 1942 (age 83); Bangalore, British India
- Years active: 1964–present
- Spouse: Christopher Morahan (1974–2017; his death)
- Children: 2, including Hattie Morahan
- Parent(s): Peter John Wilkinson; Patricia Strahan

Anna Carteret (born 11 December 1942) is a British stage and screen actress.

== Biography ==
Carteret was born as Annabelle Wilkinson on 11 December 1942 in Bangalore, British India, the daughter of Peter John Wilkinson and his wife Patricia Carteret (Strahan). She was educated at Arts Educational Schools in Tring, Hertfordshire (now the Tring Park School for the Performing Arts), where she trained for the stage.

In 1974, she married the television and film director Christopher Morahan They were together for over forty years and often worked together. The couple had two daughters, theatre director Rebecca and actress Hattie Morahan. In June 2019, Carteret spoke about living with bipolar disorder since she was a teenager.

== Films, radio and television ==
Carteret is best known for her role as police inspector Kate Longton in the BBC's 1980s television series Juliet Bravo.

Other television credits include The Saint, The Pallisers, Frederic Raphael's The Glittering Prizes, Eskimo Day, Star Maidens, Peak Practice, Holby City, and Casualty. In 1990, she was a contestant on Cluedo, facing off against John Stalker.

Films since 1959 include Dateline Diamonds (1965), The Plank (1967) and Mrs. Palfrey at the Claremont (2005). In 2012, she appeared in Private Peaceful. She portrayed Vivanti in Cats and Monkeys, co-starring with Jack Shepherd in a radio version of Catherine Shepherd's stage play, for BBC Radio 4's The Afternoon Play last broadcast on 19 November 2007.

== Voice acting ==
Carteret has also voiced Miriam in the Welsh Christian animated television series Testament: The Bible in Animation and every female character in the British children's television series Forget Me Not Farm. (After the death in 2021 of Mike Amatt, who played Scarecrow, she is the last surviving cast member of the show.) Both of these shows aired on the BBC in the UK but only Testament aired on S4C in Wales.

== Selected filmography ==
Year	Title	Role	Notes
1965	Dateline Diamonds	Gay Jenkins	Film
1966	ITV Play of the Week	Clarissa Crosswaite	The Reluctant Debutant
1967	The Plank	It's Paint Woman	Short Film
1969	The Saint	Diane Huntley	Episode: "Portrait of Brenda"
1971	Play for Today	Carol	The Pigeon Fancier
1974	The Merchant of Venice	Nerissa	TV Movie
1974	The Pallisers	Lady Mabel Grex	5 episodes
1976	The Glittering Prizes	Barbara Parks/ Barbara Ransome	2 episodes
1976	Star Maidens	Announcer	Episode: "What Have They Done to the Rain?"
1977	Fathers and Families	Clare Cotterill	3 episodes
1977	The Sunday Drama	Fiona	The Man Who Like Elephants
1978	Send in the Girls	Joy/ Sara	Episode: "The Wild Bunch"
1982	Little Miss Perkins	Laura Fitch	TV Movie
1983-5	Juliet Bravo	Inspector Kate Longton	44 episodes
1984	Weekend Playhouse	Sarah Burns	Change Partners
1988	Tickets for the Titanic	Sandra Hopkins	Everyone's a Winner
1989	The Shell Seekers	Nancy	TV Movie
1989	The Heat of the Day	Ernestine	TV Movie
1991	Ashenden	Anna Caypor	Episode: "Traitor"
1991	Forget Me Not Farm	Various (voice only)	13 episodes
1994	The Memoirs of Sherlock Holmes	Anna	Episode: "The Golden Pince-Nez"
1996	Eskimo Day	Harriet Lloyd	TV Movie
1996	Testament: The Bible in Animation	Miriam (voice only)	Episode: "Moses"
1997	Cold Enough for Snow	Harriet Lloyd	TV Movie
1999	EastEnders	Gillian Mills	4 episodes
2000	Peak Practice	Dr. Yvonne Mitchell	Episode: "One Too Often"
2005	Mrs. Palfrey at the Claremont	Elizabeth	Film
2006	The Only Boy For Me	Nana	TV Movie
2010	Poirot	Mrs. Babbington	Episode: "Three Act Tragedy"
2012	Private Peaceful	Colonel's Wife	Film
2012	Dead of the Nite	Mrs. Matthews	Film
2014	Lewis	Gillian Fernsby	2 episodes
2021	Hiraeth	Beth Seaward	Film

== Sources ==
- Who's Who in the Theatre; 17th ed. Gale (1981) ISBN 0-8103-0235-7
- The National: The Theatre and its Work 1963–1997 by Simon Callow, Nick Hern Books/NT (1997) ISBN 1-85459-323-4
- Theatre Record and Theatre Record annual indexes
