= Daphne (2007 film) =

2007 television biographical drama film

- DVD cover
- Based on: Daphne du Maurier: The Secret Life of the; Renowned Storyteller
- Screenplay by: Amy Jenkins
- Directed by: Clare Beavan
- Starring: Geraldine Somerville; Elizabeth McGovern; Janet McTeer; Andrew Havill
- Music by: Tom Smail
- Country of origin: United Kingdom
- Original language: English

Production
- Executive producer: Kim Thomas
- Producer: Clare Beavan
- Cinematography: Christopher King
- Editor: Clive Mattock
- Running time: 90 minutes
- Production companies: BBC; BBC Arts

Original release
- Network: BBC Two
- Release: 12 May 2007

Daphne is a 2007 British biographical drama film written by Amy Jenkins and directed by Clare Beavan. The film is based on the authorised biography, Daphne du Maurier: The Secret Life of the Renowned Storyteller by Margaret Forster. It stars Geraldine Somerville, Elizabeth McGovern and Janet McTeer. It premiered on BBC Two on 12 May 2007. It was filmed on location in London, Devon and Cornwall, where du Maurier spent much of her life and most of her works are set.

== Plot ==
The story begins in 1945, as Daphne is being sued by an author with the claim that she has plagiarised parts of her novel Rebecca. So she boards a ship and while travelling to New York for an appearance at the trial, she meets Ellen Doubleday, who is incredibly glamorous and elegant, and Daphne is instantly smitten. A close friendship develops between the two women, and once Ellen realises that Daphne has feelings for her, she informs Daphne, that while she believes everyone has the right to love without censure, she cannot return those feelings as she is heterosexual.

Frustrated by the rejection, Daphne writes a play called September Tide, about a forbidden love between a young man and his mother-in-law. She sees the mother-in-law character as being based on Ellen. But when Gertrude Lawrence, a confident bisexual actress, who is friends with Noël Coward, is cast in the role of the mother-in-law, her feelings become confused. Daphne initially thinks Gertrude is brash and slutty, but as she is increasingly drawn to her charisma, they eventually have an affair. The rest of the film is taken up with Daphne's competing feelings for the two women. She pines over the unavailable Ellen, while being cruelly dismissive to Gertrude.

== Cast ==
- Geraldine Somerville as Daphne du Maurier
- Elizabeth McGovern as Ellen Doubleday
- Janet McTeer as Gertrude Lawrence
- Andrew Havill as Tommy Browning
- Christopher Malcolm as Nelson Doubleday
- Malcolm Sinclair as Noël Coward
- Nicholas Murchie as New York Prosecutor
- Tim Ahern as Dickie
- Meg Dixon as Flavia

== Production notes ==
Amy Jenkins, who adapted the book to film, worked with both author Margaret Forster and the du Maurier family to help form the script. Jenkins said that du Maurier was "irreverent, reclusive, funny, and tortured during this period of her life". BBC said the movie is focused on the period of du Maurier's life that followed the success of Rebecca and led up to the writing of her short story The Birds, later made into the classic film by Alfred Hitchcock. (Note: When Hitchcock's film was released, author Frank Baker also made allegations against du Maurier, saying she had plagiarised his novel The Birds (1936) in her short story The Birds (1952). Baker was ultimately persuaded not to pursue costly litigation against Universal Studios.) Jenkins used private letters written between du Maurier and Ellen Doubleday, which showed an intense relationship between the two women. The letters were also instrumental in revealing how hard du Maurier tried to come to terms with her own sexual and emotional needs. Ellen is married to her American publisher Nelson Doubleday. Jenkins said du Maurier's story is "both tragic and illuminating and you'll never read Rebecca in the same way again." Executive producer Kim Thomas said it was amazing the way her personal life influenced her writing, she also echoed Jenkins thought and said, "once you know this story, it changes the way you read everything" du Maurier wrote.

== Critical reception ==
AfterEllen was disappointed in Geraldine Somerville's performance, calling it "rather limp", but praised Elizabeth McGovern as "radiantly beautiful and warm", and was also impressed with Janet McTeer, stating she "is instantly compelling and glamorous as Gertrude". They concluded the story is well-constructed, and "writer Amy Jenkins does a good job of winding Daphne's two loves together, showing the ways in which they affect and complement each other". The UK Gay News called the film a "superbly-crafted drama...that reveals the untold story of this fascinating writer’s life...perhaps the best-known romance writer in the English language.".

TV critic Rachel Cooke was forthright in her review for the New Statesman, calling the film a "disgrace". Cooke said the biopic focused on only one part of the writer's life – "her lesbianism". She also suggested that du Maurier "would have been horrified" at this depiction of her life, arguing that what the novelist "longed for, more than anything, was literary recognition". Cooke did have kind words for the actors though, saying "Geraldine Somerville...was exquisitely diffident...Elizabeth McGovern...was charming and delicate...and Janet McTeer...managed to pull off the great trick of being rapacious and breezy at the same time".

== See also ==
- The Birds (1963 film)
- Rebecca (1940 film)
- Rebecca (2020 film)
- List of made-for-television films with LGBT characters
