= Muckrach Castle =

Tower house, Scotland

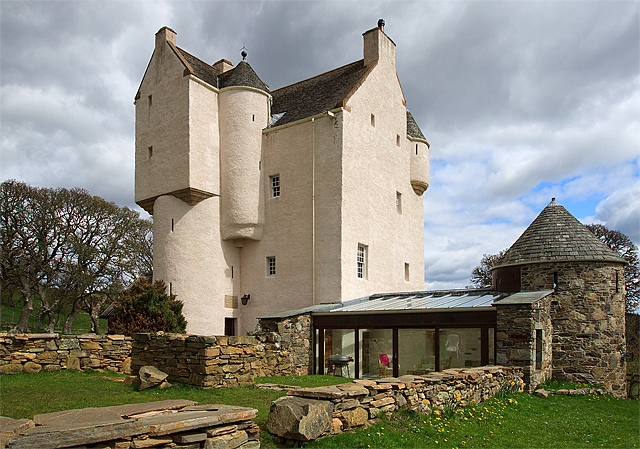
- Muckrach Castle (2010)

- Location within Highland
- 57°18′17″N 3°41′05″W
- OS grid reference: NH 98589 25051

History
- Built: 1598

Site notes
- Area: Highland council area
- Restored: 1985
- Restored by: Ian Begg
- Website: muckrachcastle.co.uk

Listed Building – Category A
- Official name: Muckrach Castle
- Designated: 5 October 1971
- Reference no.: LB249

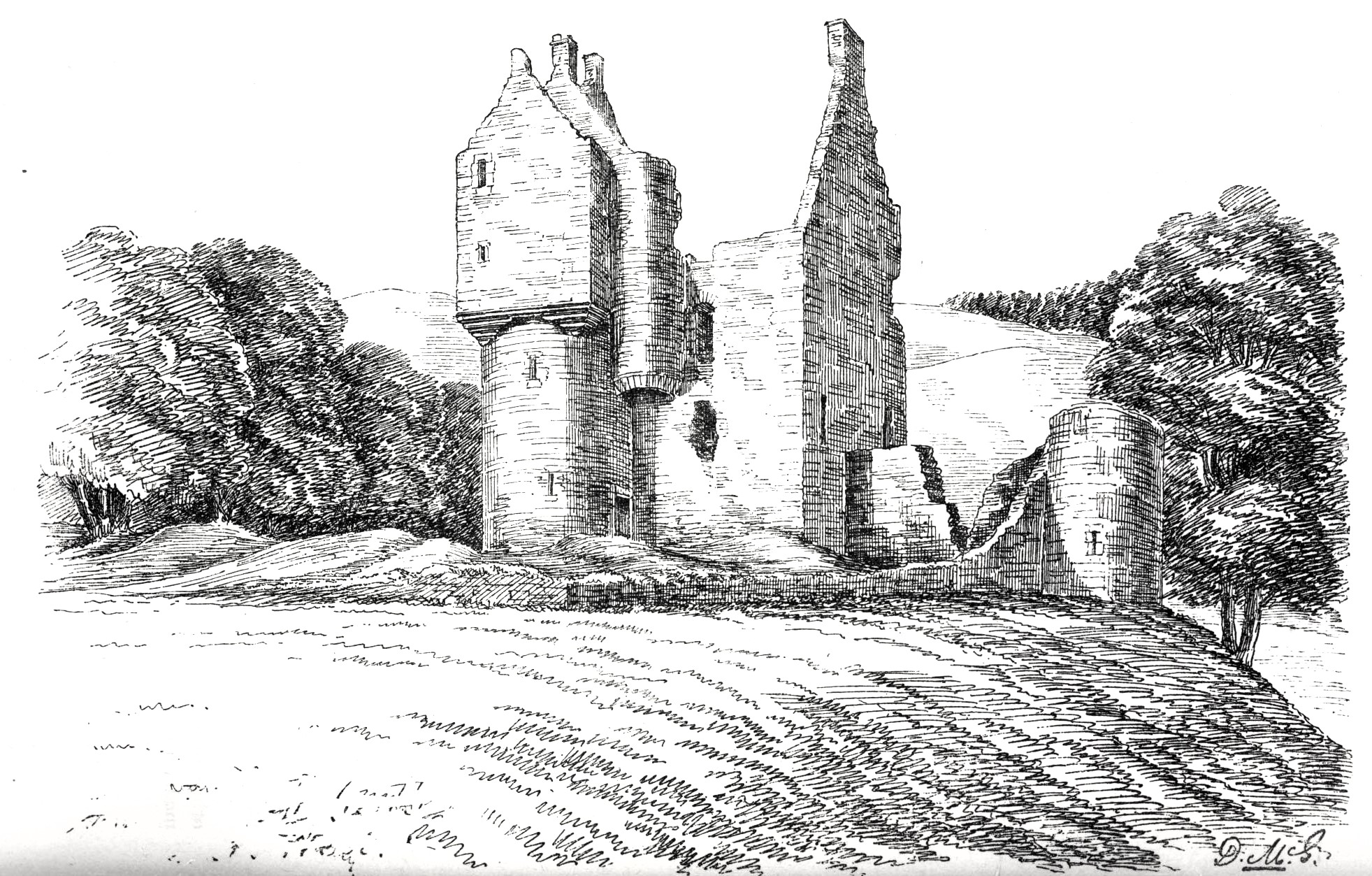
Muckraft Castle as it was in 1887

Muckrach Castle, also known as Muchrach or Muckerach Castle, is a tower house near the Scottish town of Dulnain Bridge in the Highland council area, which is part of the Cairngorms National Park. It was built in 1598 as the original seat of the Grants of Rothiemurchus, with timber used as part of the stone walls. It was unroofed in 1739 and remained ruinous until the 20th century. In 1971 the building was added to the Scottish monument lists in the highest monument category A, before being restored by the architect Ian Begg in 1978–1985. It is, since then, used as a holiday apartment.

== History ==
=== 16th to 19th century ===
The Muckrach estate was owned by John Grant of Freuchie, the laird of the Clan Grant in the 16th century. His home, Freuchie, is now known as Castle Grant, located near Grantown-on-Spey. In 1583, two years before his death in 1585, he passed it on to his second son and heir, Patrick Grant, who was knighted by King James VI and designated "of Rothiemurchus". He married Margaret Stewart, daughter of John Stewart, 3rd Earl of Atholl, and died in 1626. Patrick Grant had the Tower House built in 1598 and it served as the seat of the Grants of Rothiemurchus, which is one of the branches of Clan Grant.

Scottish architect Ian Begg said that based on its style, it may have been a "fashionable introduction", meaning its design was for social or cultural reasons rather than just functional, and guessed that John Grant brought the idea of a tower to the area. Timber was included as part of the stone walls, as in the forest-area masonry was not as well understood nor trusted and timber-building was the norm at the time.

The castle was unroofed in 1739 and thought by Begg to have been "fairly ruinous by 1767". By 1876–1878 it was said in an Ordnance Survey name book that the castle "is now in a very serious condition nothing remains of it except the walls." In 1887 it was reported to belong to the architect John Dick Peddie, who was a member of the Royal Scottish Academy.

=== 20th to 21st century ===
In the 1960s, the 6,000-acre (2,400 ha) Muckrach Estate became part of the Elvetham Estate after it was purchased from Seafield Estates. The estate is run by Sir Euan Anstruther-Gough-Calthorpe, who inherited the estate and the Anstruther-Gough-Calthorpe Baronetcy from his grandfather, Sir Richard Anstruther-Gough-Calthorpe, when the latter died in 1985. An additional unroofed building was shown on an 1874–1875 map just north of the castle, but was not on the Ordnance Survey map in 1972, and no trace of this additional building was found when the area was visited by the Royal Commission on the Ancient and Historical Monuments of Scotland (RCAHMS) in 2006. The remains of a lime kiln were also reported during that survey, about 90 metres (300 ft) from the castle. All that was visible was a trench, a 4-metre-diameter (13 ft) pot which had been filled with rubbish and was now grass-covered, and an arrangement of stones.

The castle became a category A listed building in 1971, given its heritage as the original seat of the Grants of Rothiemurchus. It was restored in 1978–1985, with work led by Begg. This was prompted by an Inverness County Council Planning Officer reminding the owners of their obligations when having a listed building. When Begg first inspected the site, the south gable of the main tower, containing flues for fireplaces, had already collapsed. This incident is thought to have happened in modern times as a bicycle crankset was found in the rubble. During the third year of the restoration, it was discovered that the original timbers within some of the stone walls had rotted, leaving voids approximately 9 by 10 inches (23 by 25 cm) and 12 feet (3.7 m) long, along with other areas where the stone corbelling was not trusted as timber had been used. The castle was restored to approximately its original shape, though it was adapted internally for more modern living.

The restored Tower House is used as a holiday apartment. It has also been used as a filming location for Christmas in the Highlands, which was released in 2019. As of 2023, a major rewilding project is being undertaken on the wider estate, covering 1,900 hectares (4,700 acres) and including creation of new woodland and wetlands.

== Location ==
The castle is located in the Cairngorms National Park. It is approximately 3 miles (4.8 km) from Grantown-on-Spey and 1 mile (1.6 km) from Dulnain Bridge. The A938 road runs off to the side, just north of the A95 road. Nearby are the ruined thirteenth-century Castle Roy and Muckrach House, which operates as a country house for hire.

== Description ==
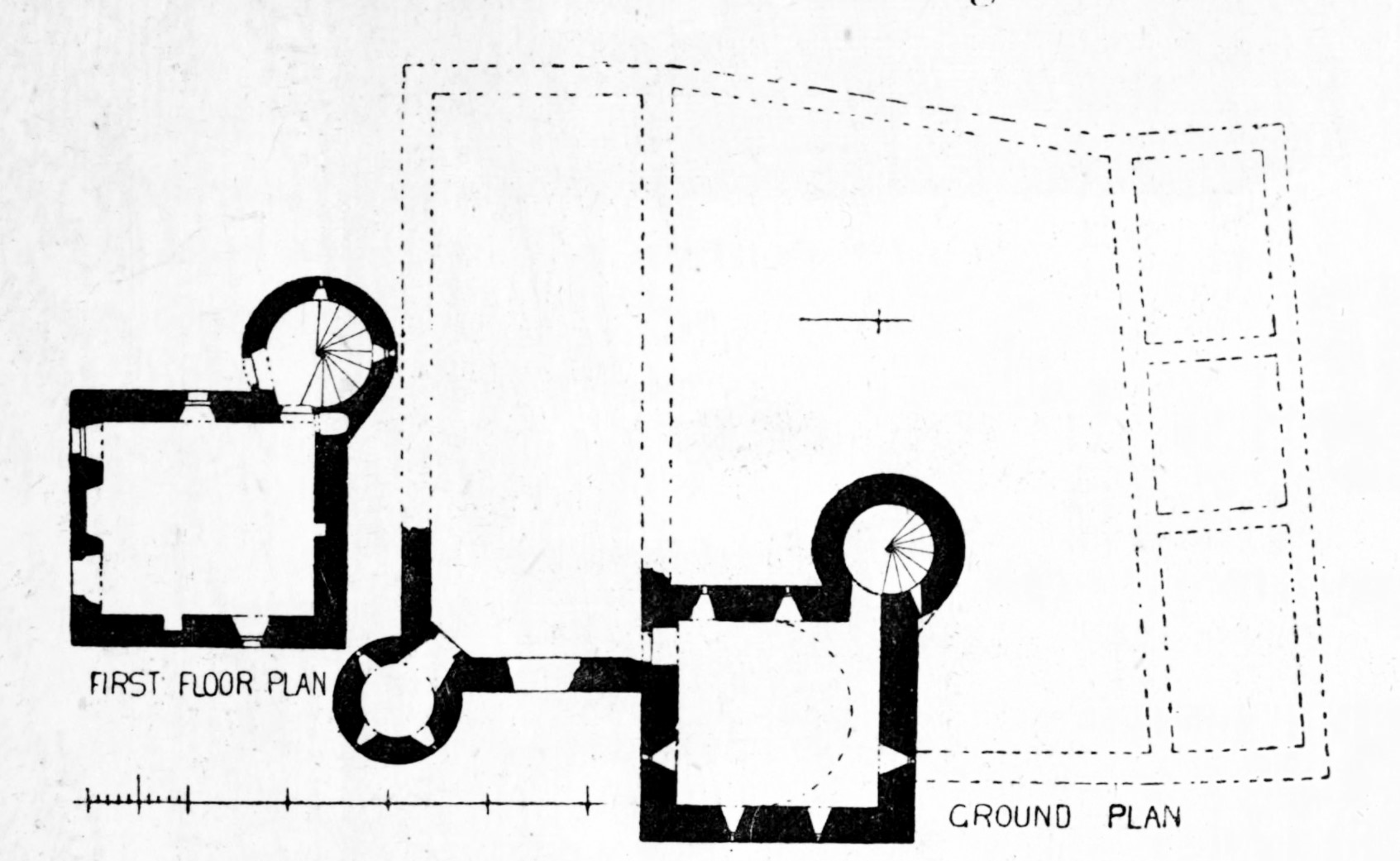
Plan of the castle, showing both the ground floor and the first floor as they appeared in 1887, with other original buildings shown as dotted lines on the ground-floor plan.

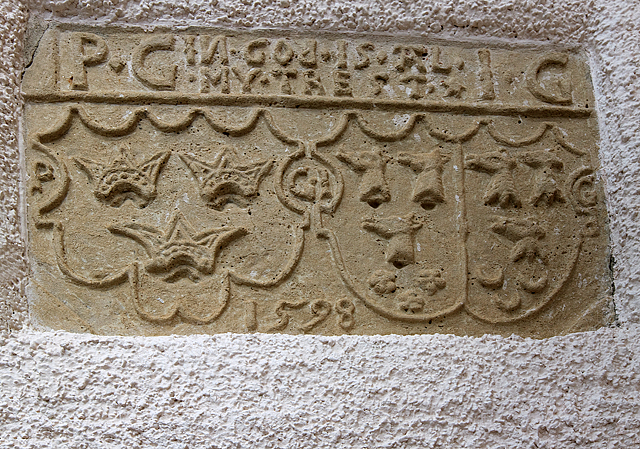
Muckrach Castle wall plaque

The castle is a relatively small structure compared to other typical castles, with the main hall only being 20 feet (6.1 m) by 21 feet (6.4 m). It is a three-storey 16th-century defensive tower and has an elongated floor plan in an L-shape. Its fieldstone masonry is plastered with harl, a rough-cast wall finish consisting of lime and aggregate. A rounded stair tower emerges from the west facade. This cantilevers onto the second floor and continues in a rectangular shape. A round tower with a conical roof protrudes from the inner corner. On the south side there is a single-storey round tower, which was once part of the fortification. It also originally had a courtyard and extensive other buildings.

At the southeast edge, there is a corner turret supported by corbelling (a construction technique where stones or bricks are progressively stepped out from the wall), commonly referred to as a tourelle. This features embrasures, openings designed for firing weapons, adding a defensive aspect to its design. There is a larger window set into the south facade on the first floor. This may have been expanded at a time after its original construction. Other windows are smaller in size and irregularly distributed. Today, four- or twelve-part lattice windows are installed. The roofs of Muckrach Castle are covered with slate. The basement is vaulted and the main hall is on the first floor.

An ornamented panel is inlaid above the main portal below the tower. In addition to the family coat of arms, the panel shows the year of construction in 1598 in conjunction with the monograms "PG" (Patrick Grant) and "IG" (Jean Grant) and bears the inscription "In God is al my Trest" (meaning "In God is all my trust").

The restored castle has the kitchen and dining room on the ground floor, as well as a conservatory through glass doors and a small utility room accessible via a spiral stone staircase. The first floor has the main hall, with wood panelling, a wood-burning stove, and stone flooring. Bedrooms are located on the second and third floors, plus the tower, with five in total.
