= Aikwood Tower =

Castle in Scottish Borders, Scotland

Coordinates: 55.524697°N 2.924235°W

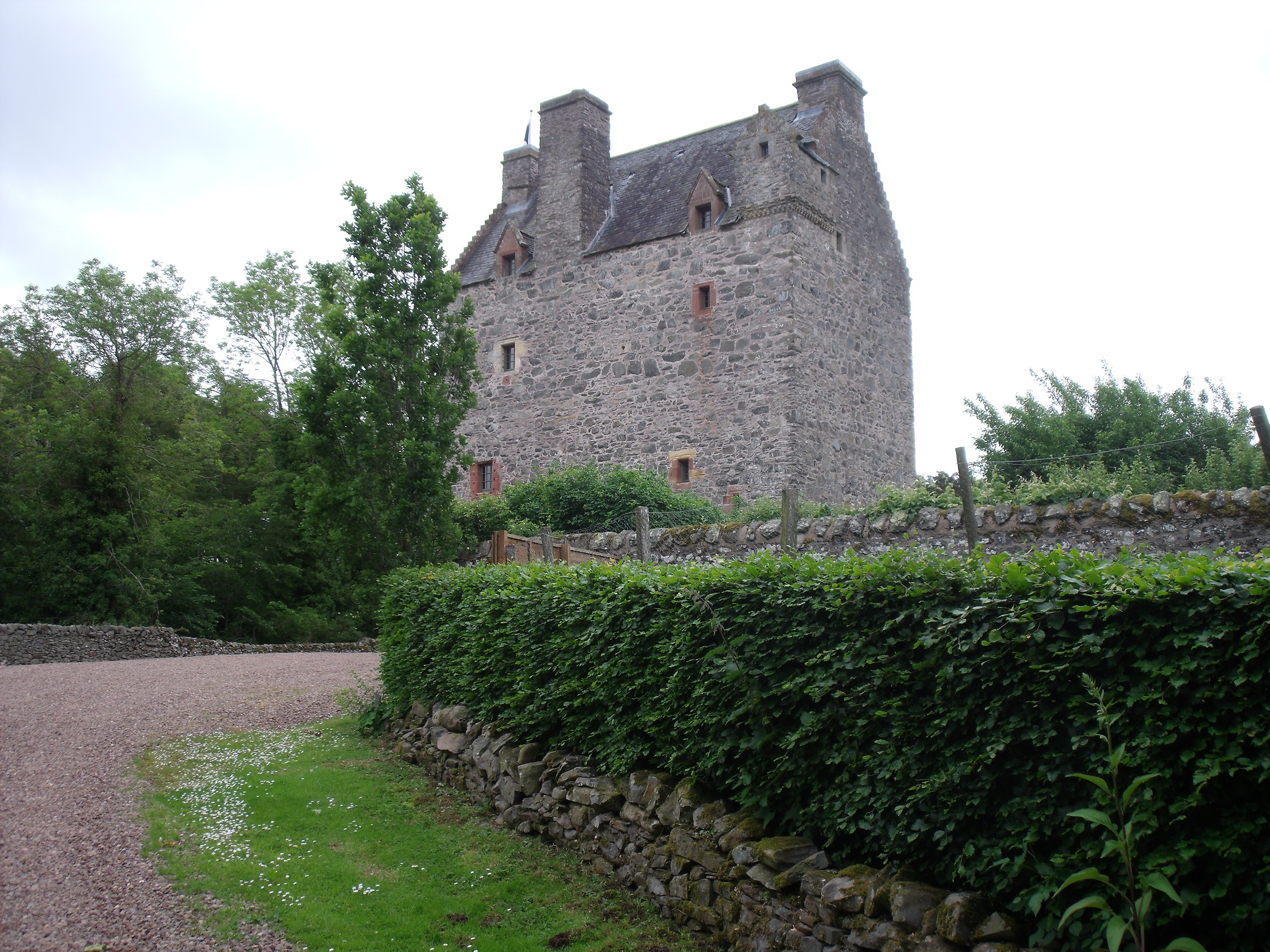
- Aikwood Tower in 2011
- Interactive map of Aikwood Tower

Listed Building – Category A

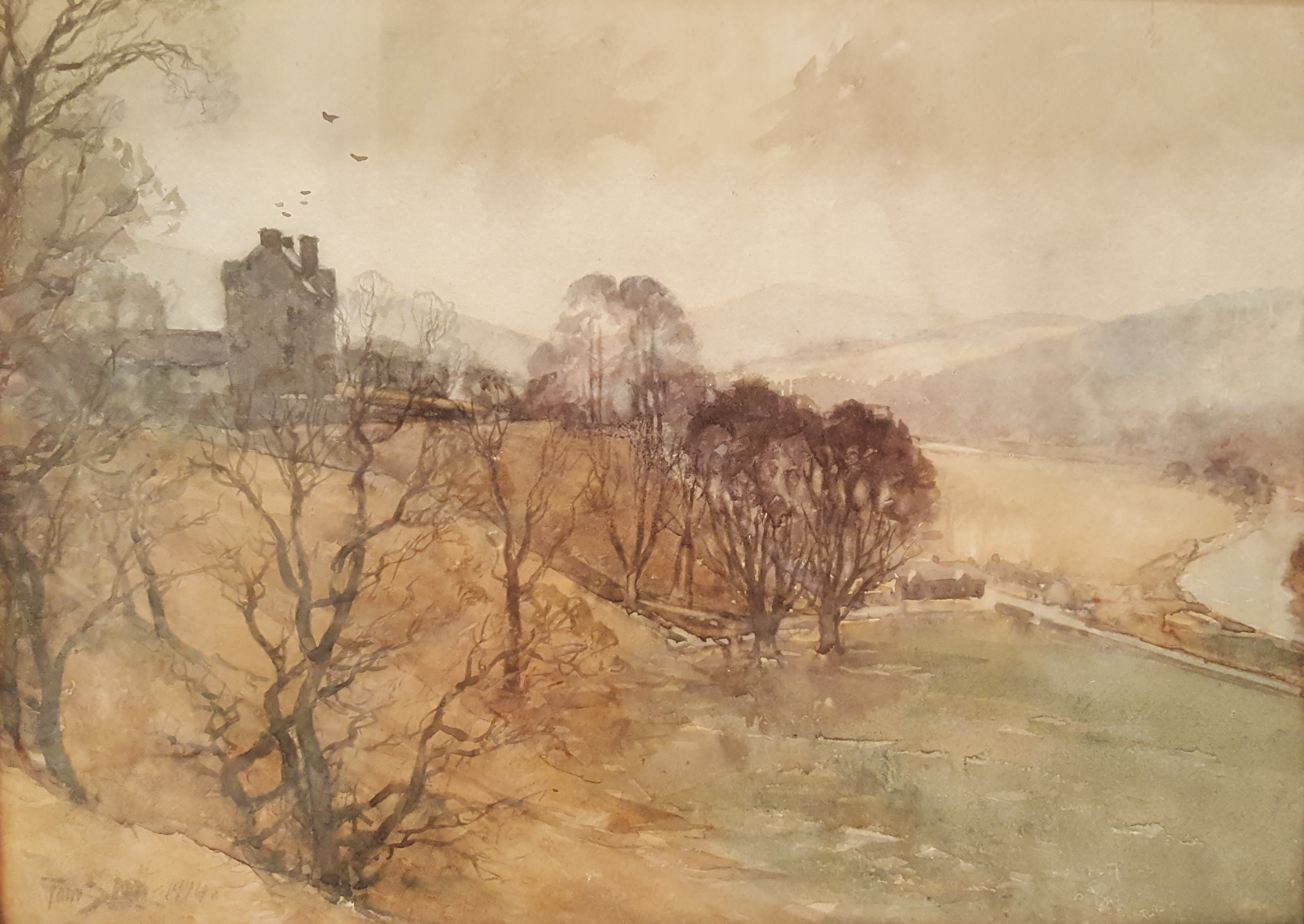
Aikwood Tower, Selkirk (1914) - Tom Scott RSA

Aikwood Tower (formerly known as Oakwood Tower) is a 16th-century tower house in the Scottish Borders area of Scotland, 4 miles (6 kilometres) southwest of the town of Selkirk, on the Ettrick Water. The tower is a Category A listed building.

== History ==
The property was granted to Robert Scott by King James V in 1517, and the tower was likely built soon afterwards, possibly as early as 1535, although the exact date of completion is not known. It was abandoned as a dwelling and was used as a store on the adjoining farm. The tower rises over four storeys with an additional attic level.

The building was restored in the early 1990s by the former Liberal Party leader David Steel, and renovated in 1992. Lord Steel purchased the property from the Duke of Buccleuch in the late 1980s, prior to undertaking the renovation works.

He and his wife lived there for twenty years from 1992 to 2012. Aikwood Tower is now owned by Steel's son Rory and his wife who operate it as a private holiday home and wedding venue.

The property was put for sale in 2025.

== See also ==
- List of places in the Scottish Borders
- List of castles in Scotland
- Restoration of castles in Scotland
