= Christmas in the Highlands =

2019 romantic comedy television film

- Genre: Christmas Romantic Comedy
- Screenplay by: Louise Burfitt-Dons
- Directed by: Ryan Dewar
- Starring: Brooke Burfitt; Dan Jeannotte; Geraldine Somerville; Caprice Bourret; Nicholas Farrell
- Music by: Ian Fisher
- Country of origin: United Kingdom
- Original language: English

Production
- Running time: 83 minutes
- Production company: Triventure Films

Original release
- Release: December 2019

Christmas in the Highlands, released in the United States as Christmas at the Castle, is a Christmas romantic comedy television film, predominantly set in Scotland. It is directed by Ryan Dewar and stars Brooke Burfitt, Dan Jeannotte, Geraldine Somerville, Caprice Bourret and Nicholas Farrell. The film premiered in December 2019 internationally, and showed on Lifetime on December 23, 2020

== Locations ==
The film is set and filmed mainly in Scotland. The fictional castle used as the main shooting location in the movie is Glamis Castle. Glamis was the childhood home of Queen Elizabeth The Queen Mother, wife of King George VI. Their second daughter, Princess Margaret, Countess of Snowdon, was born there. In 1034 King Malcolm II was murdered at Glamis, where there was a Royal Hunting Lodge. In William Shakespeare's play Macbeth (1603–1606), the eponymous character resides at Glamis Castle, although the historical King Macbeth (d. 1057) had no connection to the castle. Some filming was also done at Muckrach Castle.

Other recognizable Scottish filming locations include; Edinburgh's Christmas Market, Pickering's Gin Distillery, Tayside's Christmas Tree Farm and the ballroom at the Royal College of Physicians of Edinburgh. The award winning Highland Chocolatier Iain Burnett and his shop are featured in the movie. Free-ranging reindeer in the Cairngorms mountains at the Cairngorm Reindeer Centre were used for the snatching handbag scene.

The perfumery was filmed at Castle Forbes, currently resided by Lord and Lady Forbes. Lady Forbes developed a passion for scents and created the perfumery in 1996 and collaborated with professional fragrance creator, Andrew French, to create a range of top-quality perfumes and candles under the name of "Castle Forbes".

== See also ==
- List of Christmas films
