= Forget Me Not Farm =

BBC children's television series

- Genre: Children's
- Created by: Mike Amatt
- Written by: Mike Amatt
- Directed by: Celia Bonner
- Starring: Mike Amatt
- Voices of: Bob Peck; Anna Carteret
- Composer: Mike Amatt
- Country of origin: United Kingdom
- Original language: English
- No. of series: 1
- No. of episodes: 13

Production
- Executive producer: Edward Pugh
- Producer: Celia Bonner
- Running time: 15 minutes

Original release
- Network: BBC1
- Release: 13 November 1990 – 18 February 1991

Forget Me Not Farm (also styled as Forget-Me-Not Farm) is a BBC children's television series that was originally aired on BBC1 from 13 November 1990 to 18 February 1991. Set on the eponymous Forget Me Not Farm, the show featured a scarecrow who was played by the show's creator Mike Amatt, a pair of crows named Dandelion and Burdock, a tractor named Trundle, a pig named Portly, a cow named Gracie, a sheep named Merthyr, a tanker named Topper, an unnamed hat wearing horse who sings bass in some songs and a non-speaking mouse named Mrs. Mouse.

== Voice Cast ==
- Anna Carteret as Trundle the Tractor, Gracie the Cow and Merthyr Sheep
- Bob Peck as Dandelion and Burdock, Portly the Pig, and Topper Tanker

Following the death of Mike Amatt (31 August 1949 - 28 June 2021). Anna Carteret is now the last surviving cast member of the show.

== Origins ==
Mike Amatt first came up with the concept of the series when he made a simple tractor using LEGO, using remote control technology to give it lip-sync and eye movement and calling it "Max Tractor". His next goal was to create an environment for the tractor, and this led to him introducing the character of Scarecrow (with the two crows, Dandelion and Burdock, perching on his arms). He eventually persuaded Edward Pugh, the then-head of children's programmes at BBC North, to make a pilot programme. Celia Bonner, who produced and directed the series, later became involved in its live touring stage show, while the animation was done by Lyndon Evans Graphics. The scripts and songs were written and produced by Amatt himself (as was the incidental music), and the songs were also performed by him (as Scarecrow).

== Episodes ==
The first six episodes were originally broadcast on BBC1 as part of the Children's BBC strand on Tuesdays at 3.50 pm, but after a two-week break for Christmas and New Year, the seven remaining episodes were broadcast on Mondays instead in the same time slot.

No.	Title	Original release date
1	"Food"	13 November 1990
Matt Amatt learns about food on the farm with Scarecrow and the crows.
2	"Machinery"	20 November 1990
Down on the farm, Scarecrow and the crows look at different types of farm machinery.
3	"Doctors and Vets"	27 November 1990
A vet visits the farm to make the sick animals better.
4	"Prize Day"	4 December 1990
When the crows and the farmer visit the Royal Lancashire Agricultural Show, Scarecrow is sad because he has to stay at the farm.
5	"Growing"	11 December 1990
Scarecrow and the crows look at things that are growing in and around the farm.
6	"Milk"	18 December 1990
Scarecrow and the crows look at milk on the farm.
7	"Market"	7 January 1991
Scarecrow and the crows watch the farmer go to market with his animals.
8	"Litter"	14 January 1991
Scarecrow and the crows look at litter.
9	"Maintenance"	21 January 1991
This episode looks at how much has to be done on the farm throughout the year.
10	"Signs"	28 January 1991
This episode concentrates on looking and listening for signs around the farm.
11	"Rain"	4 February 1991
Scarecrow and the crows find out how rain can affect life on the farm.
12	"Frost"	11 February 1991
Scarecrow and the crows find out about frost.
13	"Snow"	18 February 1991
Scarecrow, the farmer and the crows look at snow.

== International airing ==
Forget Me Not Farm has also been shown a number of times in Australia on ABC. It first aired on 11 June 1992 in the afternoons at 4:45pm after TUGS, the sister series of the long running children's television series Thomas the Tank Engine & Friends and then at 10:15am during the summer and school holidays from 30 December 1993 to 17 January 1994 and 1 to 15 July and 9 to 27 December 1996. The series has also aired on Premiere 12 in Singapore, ATV World in Hong Kong, BBC Entertainment in various countries such as Malta, Cyprus, the Netherlands, Turkey, Belgium, Portugal, France and Thailand and BFBS and SSVC Television in a variety of countries such as Germany, Cyprus and the Falkland Islands.
