= The Canterbury Tales (disambiguation) =

The Canterbury Tales is a 14th-century English collection of stories, mainly in verse, written by Geoffrey Chaucer.

The Canterbury Tales may also refer to the following, which are directly or loosely derived from Chaucer's work:

- A Canterbury Tale, a 1944 British film made by Powell & Pressburger
- Canterbury Tales (musical), a 1968 British production
- The Best of Caravan - Canterbury Tales, a compilation album by Caravan
- The Canterbury Tales (film) (English title), a 1972 Italian-French film directed by Pier Paolo Pasolini as I racconti di Canterbury (Italian title)
- The Canterbury Tales (1998-2000), animated TV series nominated for the Academy Award for Animated Short Film in 1998
- Canterbury Tales (1969 TV series), shown by the BBC in 1969
- The Canterbury Tales (TV series), shown by the BBC in 2003
- The Canterbury Tales, a physical theatre piece devised by Icon Theatre in 2003
- The Canterbury Tales (tourist attraction), a 14th-century medieval living history attraction in Canterbury, Kent
- Canterbury Tales (Harriet and Sophia Lee), a 1797-1805 collection of short stories and novellas by Harriet and Sophia Lee
