= Restoration of castles in Scotland =

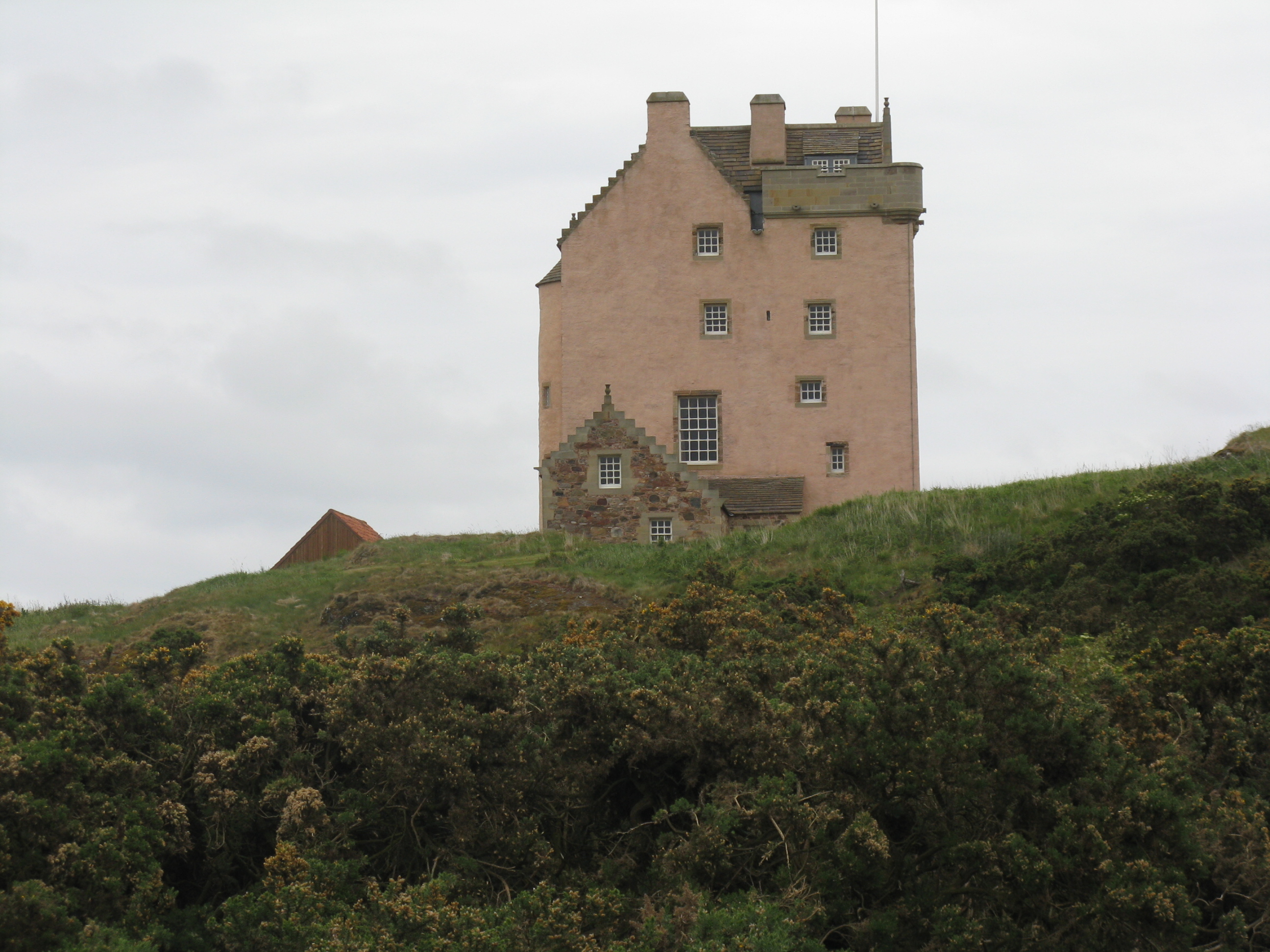
Fenton Tower, East Lothian, a restored tower house where thorough archaeological recording took place.

The restoration of castles and tower houses in Scotland, generally by private individuals and families, has been taking place for over a century and is of major significance in the field of historic buildings in the country, and sometimes a subject of controversy. This article largely focusses on 20th century restorations, in particular the 'restoration movement' of the latter part of the century, but there are examples of earlier restorations dating back to the 19th and 18th century.

Since the 1950s, two hundred and fifty Scottish castles and tower houses have been restored, around a hundred from a derelict or "roofless ruin" state. Most of these have been converted for private occupation; others, such as Castle Menzies, have become tourist attractions. The former have tended to be of the tower house type, which are a manageable size to convert and live in. A further 150 castles that are still roofed have undergone refurbishment.

== Restoration projects ==
The buildings involved in restoration projects in Scotland vary from partially collapsed, roofless, stone ruins to continuously-occupied residences requiring major repair. Many have needed extensive rebuilding, especially at the upper levels, but also of internal walls and vaults. A 2011 study found that between 1945 and 2010 ninety-seven castles were "reoccupied from a (near) ruinous state".

In addition, around a further 150 castles and tower houses still in a roofed condition have been upgraded. The work required may constitute a refurbishment – that is, the upgrading and installation of services without material alteration to the structure or major changes to the interior and/or exterior of the building. An example is Cassillis House in Ayrshire which, while not ruinous, was extensively restored in the 2010s.

Conservation and restoration projects on castles have been carried out by private individuals and companies as well as by bodies such as Historic Environment Scotland (HES) and the National Trust for Scotland (NTS). A restoration of the Great Hall of Stirling Castle was completed by Historic Scotland, a predecessor body to HES, in 1999. Parts of the castle have been restored or rebuilt at much earlier dates following its original construction, one of the earliest such projects being in 1617, when James Murray restored the roofs and some of the facilities in advance of a royal visit.

Other castles have been conserved by private trusts, such as the restoration of Portencross Castle which was largely funded by grants from sources such as the Heritage Lottery Fund and the Architectural Heritage Fund. The Landmark Trust has restored tower houses such as Fairburn Tower on the Cromarty Firth in north east Scotland.

== The typical restoration process ==
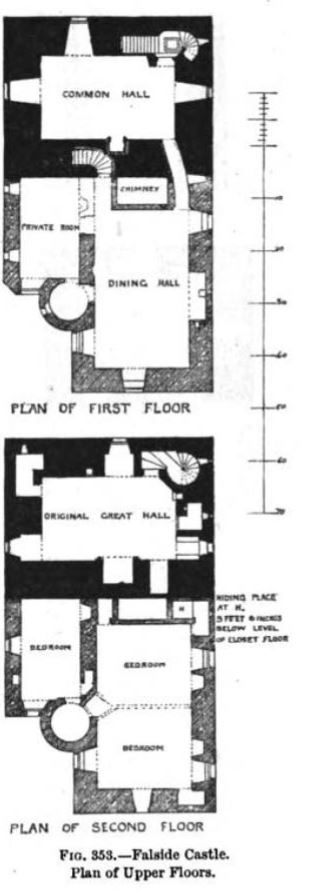
Fawside Castle, floor plans showing the Keep and the L-shaped part.

An example of a typical restoration project is the restoration of Fawside (or Fa'side) Castle near Edinburgh, which was carried out between 1976 and 1982. The work was primarily undertaken to provide a home for the owners. The castle was in a ruinous state, a large part of the building being roofless; many areas of wall heads had fallen away. The project turned out to be far more costly than the owners envisaged. Because of its scale, the owners employed tradesmen to carry out most of the work.

The building was typical of many tower houses, although larger than average. It consisted of two wings: the original 14th-century keep with massive walls and a later L-shaped addition from the 15th–16th century. The keep element was still roofed, but the L-shaped part was roofless and wall tops had fallen away, including those of two bartizans (turrets) where only the bases remained.

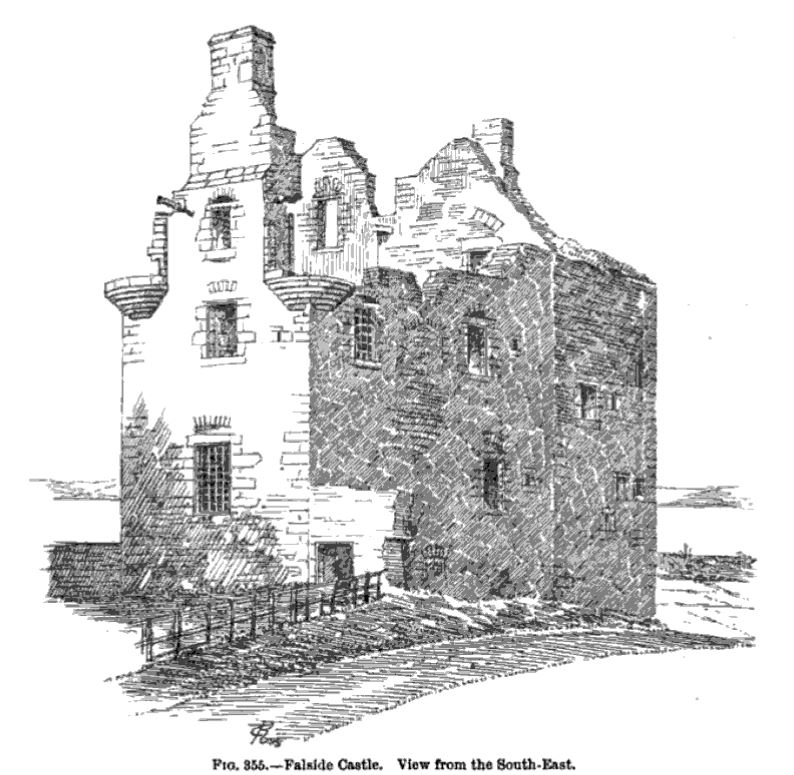
Fawside Castle from MacGibbon & Ross, looking much as it did when the restoration started

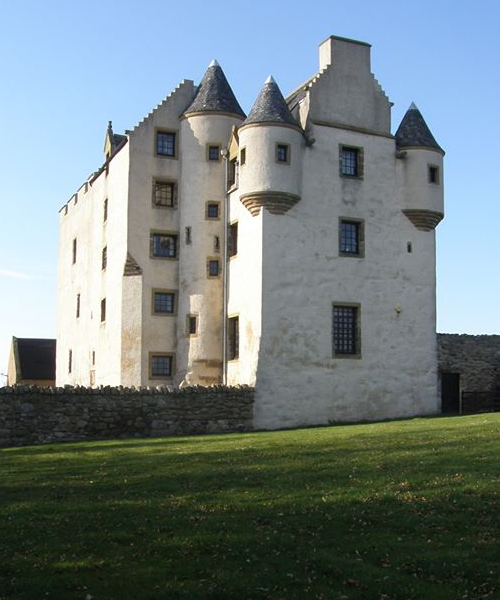
Fawside Castle, restored between 1976 and 1982

This restoration required much research in advance, some conjecture in replacing lost features, and many discussions with Historic Scotland, the local authority in Haddingtonshire, fire officers, the architect and other specialists. Applications for grants, totalling over £100,000, were successful.

After rubble, including fallen masonry, had been removed from the interior, the building work began with the rebuilding of walls, the insertion of new floors, the re-roofing of the L-shaped part and the addition of services, such as plumbing, heating and electrics. Substantial supplies of stone, timber and roof slates had to be sourced. Finally, the exterior of the building was harled. In the course of these activities, several original features of the building were rediscovered, for example, on the second floor of the L-shaped wing, a mural chamber with a sunken recess was located behind an old cupboard.

An aspect of this restoration was the extensive use of modern materials, principally bricks and concrete, for parts of the structure. The re-instated basement level vault was constructed entirely in the latter. Cross walls and bartizans were rebuilt in brick. The use of such materials has generated debate in conservation circles. Some projects have avoided modern materials and rebuilt and repaired only in stone.

Not all 'restorations' of castles and tower houses have been successful. Some have failed for reasons such as lack of finance or have simply taken a very long time.

== Conservation and restoration ==
The motivations for restorations have been various, but most common has been the desire to rescue an old building for private domestic owner-occupation.

The process has caused debate, with Historic Scotland and local planning authorities rejecting many recent restoration projects. In the period from the 1960s to the 1990s, Historic Scotland and its predecessor organisations were more in favour of a restoration approach, approving and grant-aiding a considerable number of restoration projects, largely under the direction of Professor David Walker, the then Chief Inspector of Monuments. Walker names 53 such grant-aided projects. 'Restorers' have argued that, as well as providing homes they are rescuing buildings that would otherwise have eventually decayed or collapsed. Elements of the 'conservation' lobby argue that ruins should be preserved as found, following Society for the Protection of Ancient Buildings (SPAB) principles; other concerns are that inappropriate materials may be used for repairs and rebuilds and that restoration can conceal much of the early history of the building.

The 'conservation' approach became more prominent through the 1990s and beyond. Although HES (formed by a merger of HS and the Royal Commission on the Ancient and Historical Monuments of Scotland) now has a list of buildings suitable for restoration, fewer and fewer castle restoration projects have been undertaken in the 2000s, as can be seen from Inglis' table of completed restorations (op cit, pp 258–260). This has been due to factors such as a lack of availability of suitable sites, a greater realisation of the huge amount of work and costs that may be involved, and greater reluctance on the part of the authorities to endorse and/or grant aid restoration projects.

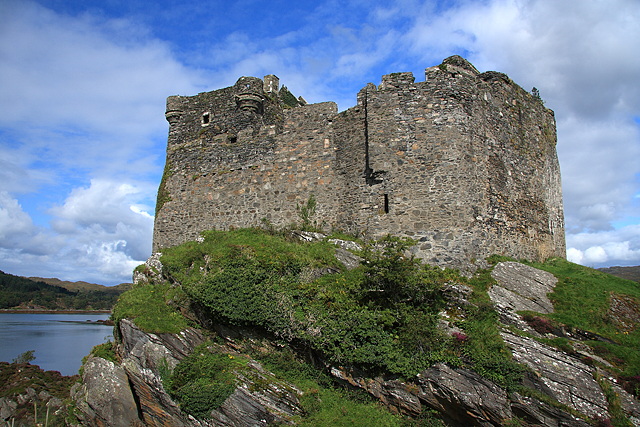
Castle Tioram

=== Castle Tioram ===
The best-known example of a rejected restoration project was that off Castle Tioram in Moidart. Tioram gained notoriety as "the epicentre of the restoration controversy" (Davis, op cit, pp 58–60).

In 1997, Lex Brown of Anta Estates Ltd put forward proposals for restoration of the castle to a habitable status. Historic Scotland refused, and the matter went to a public enquiry, where the Reporter and then Scottish Ministers refused the Appeal in 2002. The matter generated a public debate which was generally in favour of restoration.(Davis, op cit, p 58) In 2016 HES agreed that the castle could be restored and brought back into residential use.

At Castle Tioram a very large sum was spent on surveying and recording the remains by an archaeological team, but work of this nature on a standing building can be expensive and can discourage restoration.(Davis, op cit, 37–39)

== Further examples of restorations ==
A full list of castle restorations up to 2010 is contained in Inglis (op cit). For more details of the restoration processes, the following selected case studies in various books and publications contain more in-depth accounts.

Image	Castle	Location	Date	References
	Aiket	Ayrshire	1970s	Clow, Brennan-Inglis
	Aikwood	Selkirkshire	1980s	Fawcett & Rutherford, Brennan-Inglis
	Balgonie	Fife	1970s	Fawcett & Rutherford
	Ballone Castle	Highland Council Area (formerly Easter Ross)	1990s	Miers, M
	Barholm	Dumfries & Galloway	2000s	Brennan-Inglis
	Caldwell Tower	East Renfrewshire	2011	Davis
	Fairburn Tower	Muir of Ord, Highland Council Area	2023	Landmark Trust
	Fawside	East Lothian	1970s/80s	Clow
	Fenton Tower	East Lothian	2000s	Dallas, Ed
	Kinkell Castle	Black Isle, Highland Council Area	1960s	Laing, G
	Lauriston Castle, Aberdeenshire	Aberdeenshire	1989-93	Sharples, Walker and Woodworth [24]
	Liberton Tower	Midlothian	1990s	Fawcett & Rutherford
	Mains Castle, South Lanarkshire	East Kilbride	1970s/80s	Clow
	Melgund	Angus	1990s	Fawcett & Rutherford
	Menzies	Perthshire	1970s	Fawcett & Rutherford
	Midhope	West Lothian	1990s	Clow
	Muckrach Castle	Highland	1990s	Clow
	Rossend Castle	Fife	1970s	Fawcett & Rutherford
	Rusco Tower	Dumfries and Galloway	1970s	Clow
	Tilquhilly	Kincardshire	1980/90s	Clow
	Towie Barclay	Aberdeenshire	1970s	Fawcett & Rutherford

== See also ==
- Castles in Great Britain and Ireland

== Sources and further reading ==
- Restoring Scotland's Castles, 2000, Robert Clow, Editor. Report of a conference held in Glasgow in 1991 (but not published until 2000). Very detailed chapters on eleven restorations, largely written by the original owner-occupiers and/or their architects and builders.
- Scotland's Castle Culture, 2011, Dakin, Glendinning & MacKechnie, Eds. A detailed overview of the history of all castle building in Scotland since the 13th century. Chapter 5 by Watters and Chapter 6 by Walker summarise the modern restoration movement, especially Walker, who was HS Chief Inspector of Historic Buildings from 1975 to 1993.
- The Scottish Castle Restoration Debate 1990 – 2012, 2013, Michael C Davis. This work touches on many topics not covered elsewhere, for example, Davis considers the over dominance of archaeological as against architectural history in assessing restorations. In general he favours the restoration route as having saved many buildings which would otherwise continue to decay.
- Ayrshire’s Castle Restorations, 2020, Michael C Davis, pp116–130. A shorter article by Davis published by the Castle Studies Group, while focussed on restored Ayrshire castles the article summarises many of the arguments for and against restorations.
- Renewed Life for Scottish Castles, 2011, Richard Fawcett & Allan Rutherford. Part of an initiative commenced by Historic Scotland in 2009 to consider future policy towards conservation and restoration. While independently written it contains the semi-official HS point of view.
- Managing Change in the Historic Environment: Castles and Towerhouses, 2017, Historic Environment Scotland. Non-statutory guidance note "...for anyone considering a [Scottish] castle consolidation or restoration project."
- Scotland's Castles: Rescued, Rebuilt and Reoccupied, 2014, Janet Brennan-Inglis. A more personal and informal approach to the subject, but of particular interest as the author and her husband have personally restored a tower house, Barholm Tower. Focusses in particular on the restorers, their projects and their experiences.
- Scotland’s Castles: Rescued, Rebuilt and Reoccupied, 1945–2010, PhD Thesis, University of Dundee, 2011, Janet Inglis. A very thorough and comprehensive review, with many tables, appendices and references
- Faultless Towers, 2023, Mary Miers. Article supporting restorations written by the Founder and Director of the Scottish 'Buildings at Risk Register', published in the 'Scottish Field' magazine.
