= National Board of Review Award for Best Supporting Actor =

Annual film award

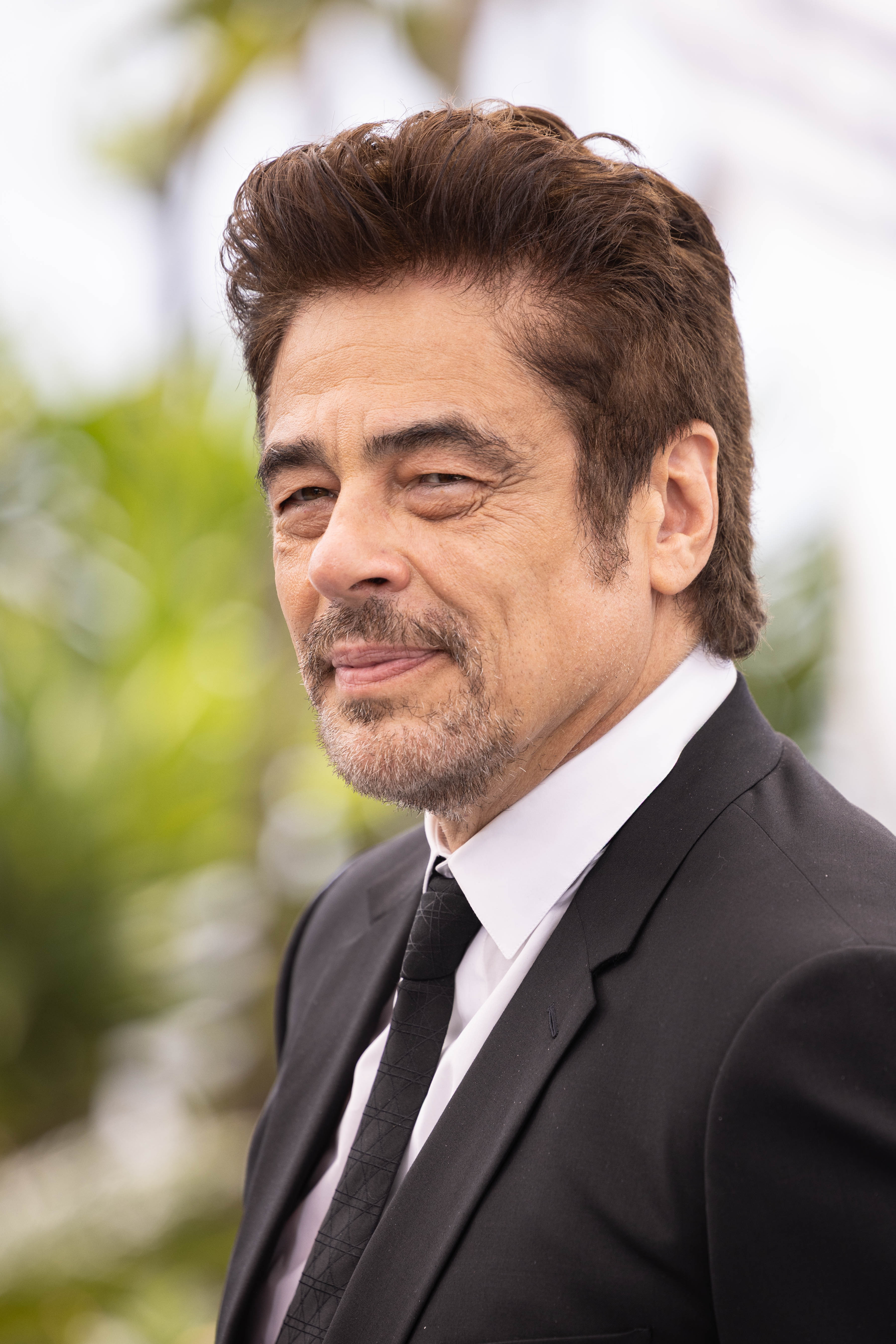
- Current recipient: Benicio del Toro
- Awarded for: Best Performance by an Actor in a Supporting Role
- Country: United States
- Presented by: National Board of Review
- First award: John Williams; Dial M for Murder (1954)
- Currently held by: Benicio del Toro; One Battle After Another (2025)
- Website: nationalboardofreview.org

The National Board of Review Award for Best Supporting Actor is one of the annual film awards given (since 1954) by the National Board of Review of Motion Pictures.

== Winners ==
=== 1950s ===
Year	Winner	Film	Role
1954	John Williams	Dial M for Murder	Chief Inspector Hubbard
1954	John Williams	Sabrina	Thomas Fairchild
1955	Charles Bickford	Not as a Stranger	Dr. Dave W. Runkleman
1956	Richard Basehart	Moby Dick	Ishmael
1957	Sessue Hayakawa	The Bridge on the River Kwai	Colonel Saito
1958	Albert Salmi	The Bravados	Ed Taylor
1958	Albert Salmi	The Brothers Karamazov	Pavel Fyodorovich Smerdyakov
1959	Hugh Griffith	Ben-Hur	Sheik Ilderim

=== 1960s ===
Year	Winner	Film	Role
1960	George Peppard	Home from the Hill	Raphael "Rafe" Copley
1961	Jackie Gleason	The Hustler	George "Minnesota Fats" Hegerman
1962	Burgess Meredith	Advise & Consent	Herbert Gelman
1963	Melvyn Douglas	Hud	Homer Bannon
1964	Martin Balsam	The Carpetbaggers	Bernard B. Norman
1965	Harry Andrews	The Agony and the Ecstasy	Donato Bramante
1965	Harry Andrews	The Hill	Bert Wilson
1966	Robert Shaw	A Man for All Seasons	King Henry VIII
1967	Paul Ford	The Comedians	Mr. Smith
1968	Leo McKern	The Shoes of the Fisherman	Cardinal Leone
1969	Philippe Noiret	Topaz	Henri Jarre

=== 1970s ===
Year	Winner	Film	Role
1970	Frank Langella	Diary of a Mad Housewife	George Prager
1970	Frank Langella	The Twelve Chairs	Ostap Bender
1971	Ben Johnson	The Last Picture Show	Sam the Lion
1972	Joel Grey	Cabaret	Master of Ceremonies
1972	Al Pacino	The Godfather	Michael Corleone
1973	John Houseman	The Paper Chase	Charles Kingsfield, Jr.
1974	Holger Löwenadler	Lacombe, Lucien	Albert Horn
1975	Charles Durning	Dog Day Afternoon	Eugene Moretti
1976	Jason Robards	All the President's Men	Ben Bradlee
1977	Tom Skerritt	The Turning Point	Wayne Rodgers
1978	Richard Farnsworth	Comes a Horseman	Dodger
1979	Paul Dooley	Breaking Away	Raymond Stohler

=== 1980s ===
Year	Winner	Film	Role
1980	Joe Pesci	Raging Bull	Joey LaMotta
1981	Jack Nicholson	Reds	Eugene O'Neill
1982	Robert Preston	Victor/Victoria	Carroll "Toddy" Todd
1983	Jack Nicholson	Terms of Endearment	Garrett Breedlove
1984	John Malkovich	Places in the Heart	Mr. Will
1985	Klaus Maria Brandauer	Out of Africa	Bror von Blixen-Finecke
1986	Daniel Day-Lewis	My Beautiful Laundrette	Johnny Burfoot
1986	Daniel Day-Lewis	A Room with a View	Cecil Vyse
1987	Sean Connery	The Untouchables	Jimmy "Jim" Malone
1988	River Phoenix	Running on Empty	Danny Pope
1989	Alan Alda	Crimes and Misdemeanors	Lester

=== 1990s ===
Year	Winner	Film	Role
1990	Joe Pesci	Goodfellas	Tommy DeVito
1991	Anthony Hopkins	The Silence of the Lambs	Dr. Hannibal Lecter
1992	Jack Nicholson	A Few Good Men	Colonel Nathan R. Jessup, USMC
1993	Leonardo DiCaprio	What's Eating Gilbert Grape	Arnie Grape
1994	Gary Sinise	Forrest Gump	Lt. Dan Taylor
1995	Kevin Spacey	Se7en	John Doe
1995	Kevin Spacey	The Usual Suspects	Roger "Verbal" Kint
1996	Edward Norton	Everyone Says I Love You	Holden Spence
1996	Edward Norton	The People vs. Larry Flynt	Alan Isaacman
1996	Edward Norton	Primal Fear	Aaron Stamper / Roy
1997	Greg Kinnear	As Good as It Gets	Simon Bishop
1998	Ed Harris	The Truman Show	Christof
1999	Philip Seymour Hoffman	Magnolia	Phil Parma
1999	Philip Seymour Hoffman	The Talented Mr. Ripley	Freddie Miles

=== 2000s ===
Year	Winner	Film	Role
2000	Joaquin Phoenix	Gladiator	Commodus
2000	Joaquin Phoenix	Quills	François Simonet de Coulmier
2000	Joaquin Phoenix	The Yards	Willie
2001	Jim Broadbent	Iris	John Bayley
2001	Jim Broadbent	Moulin Rouge!	Harold Zidler
2002	Chris Cooper	Adaptation.	John Laroche
2003	Alec Baldwin	The Cooler	Sheldon "Shelly" Kaplow
2004	Thomas Haden Church	Sideways	Jack Cole
2005	Jake Gyllenhaal	Brokeback Mountain	Jack Twist
2006	Djimon Hounsou	Blood Diamond	Solomon Vandy
2007	Casey Affleck	The Assassination of Jesse James by the Coward Robert Ford	Robert Ford
2008	Josh Brolin	Milk	Dan White
2009	Woody Harrelson	The Messenger	Capt. Tony Stone

=== 2010s ===
Year	Winner	Film	Role
2010	Christian Bale	The Fighter	Dicky Eklund
2011	Christopher Plummer	Beginners	Hal Fields
2012	Leonardo DiCaprio	Django Unchained	Calvin J. Candie
2013	Will Forte	Nebraska	David Grant
2014	Edward Norton	Birdman	Mike Shiner
2015	Sylvester Stallone	Creed	Rocky Balboa
2016	Jeff Bridges	Hell or High Water	Marcus Hamilton
2017	Willem Dafoe	The Florida Project	Bobby Hicks
2018	Sam Elliott	A Star Is Born	Bobby Maine
2019	Brad Pitt	Once Upon a Time in Hollywood	Cliff Booth

=== 2020s ===
Year	Winner	Film	Role
2020	Paul Raci	Sound of Metal	Joe
2021	Ciarán Hinds	Belfast	Pop
2022	Brendan Gleeson	The Banshees of Inisherin	Colm Doherty
2023	Mark Ruffalo	Poor Things	Duncan Wedderburn
2024	Kieran Culkin	A Real Pain	Benji Kaplan
2025	Benicio del Toro	One Battle After Another	Sergio St. Carlos

== Multiple awards ==
3 wins

- Jack Nicholson (1981, 1983, 1992)

2 wins

- Leonardo DiCaprio (1993, 2012)
- Edward Norton (1996, 2014)
- Joe Pesci (1980, 1990)

== See also ==
- New York Film Critics Circle Award for Best Supporting Actor
- National Society of Film Critics Award for Best Supporting Actor
- Los Angeles Film Critics Association Award for Best Supporting Actor
- Academy Award for Best Supporting Actor
