= Reign in Hell =

Reign in Hell may refer to:

- Reign in Hell (comics), a 2008-2009 comic book miniseries
- Reign in Hell (novel), a 1997 novel by William Diehl
