= Florida Film Critics Circle Award for Best Supporting Actor =

Annual US film award

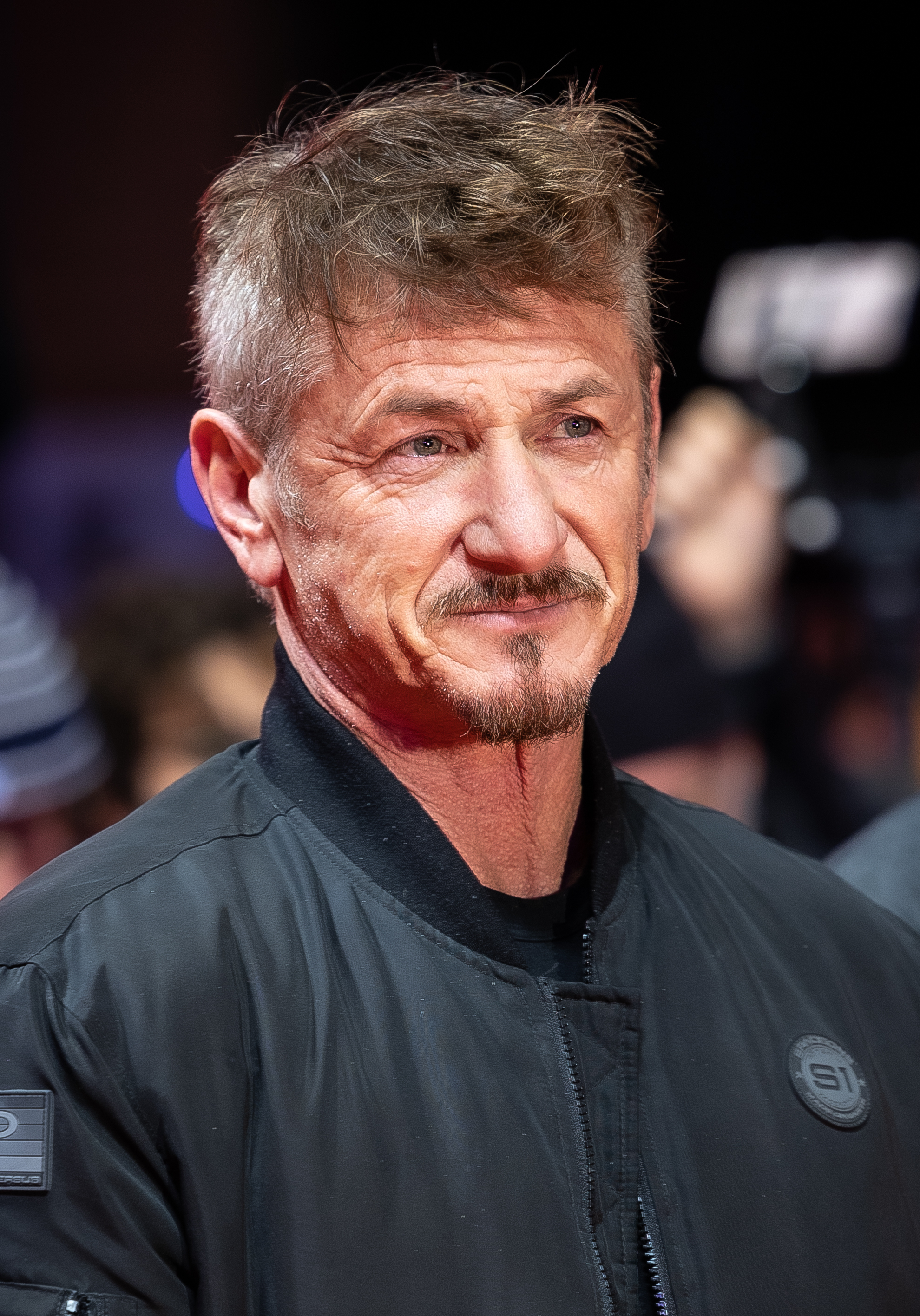
- The 2025 recipient: Sean Penn
- Awarded for: Best Performance by an Actor in a Supporting Role
- Country: United States
- Presented by: Florida Film Critics Circle
- First award: Courtney Love; The People vs. Larry Flynt (1996)
- Currently held by: Sean Penn; One Battle After Another (2025)
- Website: floridafilmcritics.com

The Florida Film Critics Circle Award for Best Supporting Actor is an award given by the Florida Film Critics Circle to honor the finest supporting male acting achievements in film-making.

== Winners ==
=== 1990s ===
Year	Winner	Film	Role
1996	Edward Norton	Everyone Says I Love You	Holden Spence
1996	Edward Norton	The People vs. Larry Flynt	Alan Isaacman
1996	Edward Norton	Primal Fear	Aaron Stampler / Roy
1997	Rupert Everett	My Best Friend's Wedding	George
1998	Robert Duvall	A Civil Action	Jerome Facher
1999	Haley Joel Osment	The Sixth Sense	Cole Sear

=== 2000s ===
Year	Winner	Film	Role
2000	Benicio del Toro	Traffic	Javier Rodriguez
2001	Ben Kingsley	Sexy Beast	Don Logan
2002	Chris Cooper	Adaptation.	John Laroche
2003	Tim Robbins	Mystic River	Dave Boyle
2004	Thomas Haden Church	Sideways	Jack Lopate
2005	Paul Giamatti	Cinderella Man	Joe Gould
2006	Jack Nicholson	The Departed	Francis "Frank" Costello
2007	Javier Bardem	No Country for Old Men	Anton Chigurh
2008	Heath Ledger (posthumous)	The Dark Knight	The Joker
2009	Christoph Waltz	Inglourious Basterds	Hans Landa

=== 2010s ===
Year	Nominee	Film	Role
2010	Christian Bale	The Fighter	Dicky Eklund
2011	Albert Brooks	Drive	Bernie Rose
2012	Philip Seymour Hoffman	The Master	Lancaster Dodd
2013	Jared Leto	Dallas Buyers Club	Rayon
2014	J. K. Simmons	Whiplash	Terence Fletcher
2015	Oscar Isaac	Ex Machina	Nathan Bateman
2016	Jeff Bridges	Hell or High Water	Marcus Hamilton
2017	Sam Rockwell	Three Billboards Outside Ebbing, Missouri	Jason Dixon
2018	Steven Yeun	Burning	Ben
2019	Joe Pesci	The Irishman	Russell Bufalino

=== 2020s ===
Year	Nominee	Film	Role
2020	Paul Raci	Sound of Metal	Joe
2021	Kodi Smit-McPhee	The Power of the Dog	Peter Gordon
2022	Ke Huy Quan	Everything Everywhere All at Once	Waymond Wang
2023	Charles Melton	May December	Joe Yoo
2024	Jeremy Strong	The Apprentice	Roy Cohn
2025	Sean Penn	One Battle After Another	Col. Steven J. Lockjaw
