= Boston Society of Film Critics Award for Best Supporting Actor =

Annual US film award

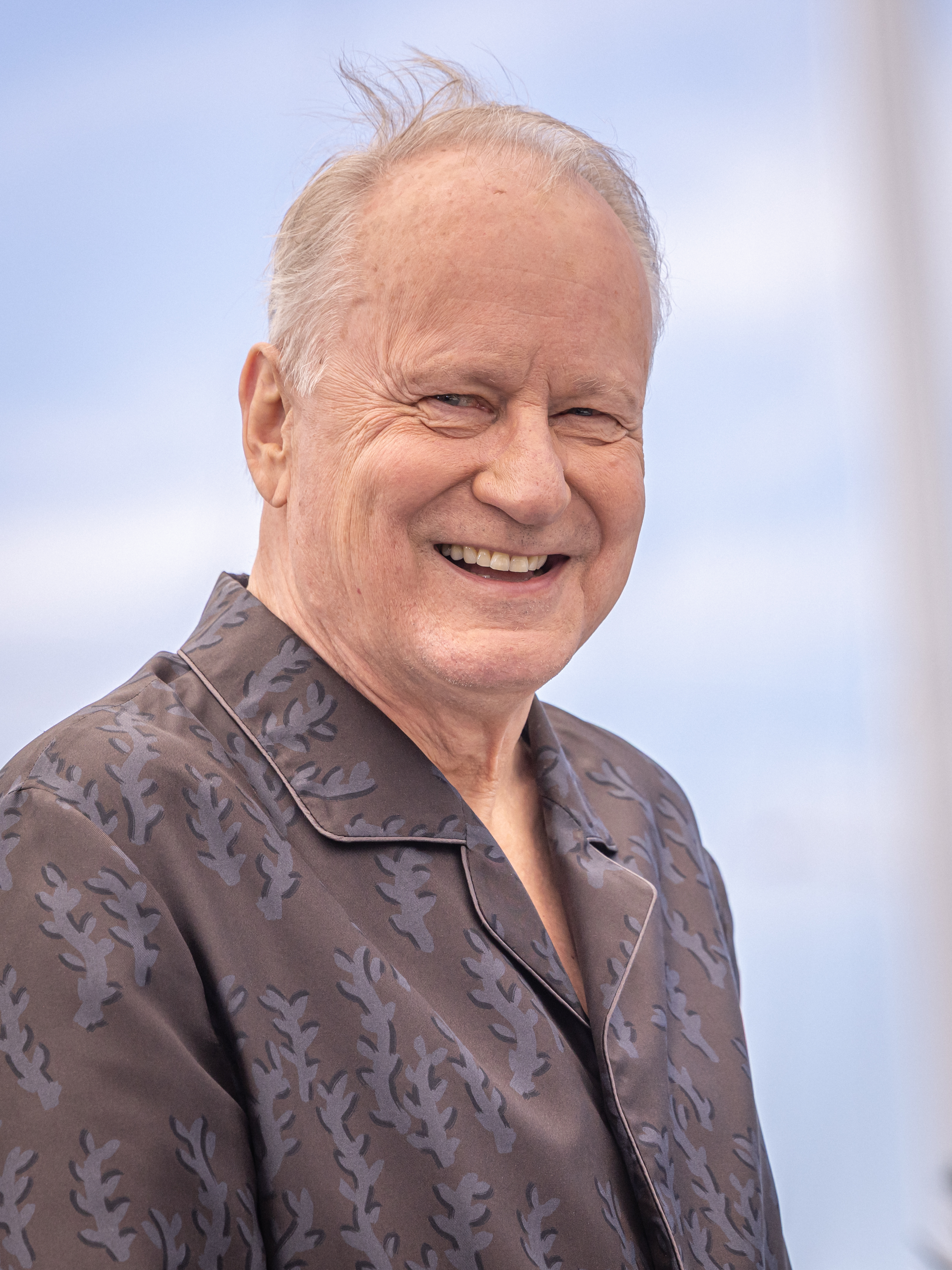
- Current recipient: Stellan Skarsgård
- Awarded for: Best Performance by an Actor in a Supporting Role
- Country: United States
- Presented by: Boston Society of Film Critics
- First award: Jason Robards; Melvin and Howard (1980)
- Currently held by: Stellan Skarsgård; Sentimental Value (2025)
- Website: bostonfilmcritics.org

The Boston Society of Film Critics Award for Best Supporting Actor is one of the annual film awards given by the Boston Society of Film Critics.

== Winners ==
=== 1980s ===
Year	Winner	Film	Role
1980	Jason Robards	Melvin and Howard	Howard Hughes
1981	Jack Nicholson	Reds	Eugene O'Neill
1982	Mickey Rourke	Diner	Robert "Boogie" Sheftell
1983	Jack Nicholson	Terms of Endearment	Garrett Breedlove
1984	John Malkovich	The Killing Fields	Al Rockoff
1984	John Malkovich	Places in the Heart	Mr. Will
1985	Ian Holm	Brazil	Mr. Kurtzmann
1985	Ian Holm	Dance with a Stranger	Desmond Cussen
1985	Ian Holm	Dreamchild	Charles L. Dodgson
1985	Ian Holm	Wetherby	Stanley Pilborough
1986	Dennis Hopper	Blue Velvet	Frank Booth
1986	Ray Liotta	Something Wild	Ray Sinclair
1987	R. Lee Ermey	Full Metal Jacket	Gunnery Sergeant Hartman
1988	Dean Stockwell	Married to the Mob	Tony “The Tiger” Russo
1988	Dean Stockwell	Tucker: The Man and His Dream	Howard Hughes
1989	Danny Aiello	Do the Right Thing	Salvatore “Sal” Fragione

=== 1990s ===
Year	Winner	Film	Role
1990	Joe Pesci	Goodfellas	Tommy DeVito
1991	Anthony Hopkins	The Silence of the Lambs	Dr. Hannibal Lecter
1992	Gene Hackman	Unforgiven	Little Bill Daggett
1993	Ralph Fiennes	Schindler's List	Amon Göth
1994	Martin Landau	Ed Wood	Bela Lugosi
1995	Kevin Spacey	The Usual Suspects	Roger “Verbal” Kint
1996	Edward Norton	Everyone Says I Love You	Holden Spence
1996	Edward Norton	Primal Fear	Aaron Stampler
1996	Edward Norton	The People vs. Larry Flynt	Alan Isaacman
1997	Kevin Spacey	L.A. Confidential	Detective Sergeant Jack Vincennes
1998	William H. Macy	A Civil Action	James Gordon
1998	William H. Macy	Pleasantville	George Parker
1998	William H. Macy	Psycho	Milton Arbogast
1998	Billy Bob Thornton	A Simple Plan	Jacob Mitchell
1999	Christopher Plummer	The Insider	Mike Wallace

=== 2000s ===
Year	Winner	Film	Role
2000	Fred Willard	Best in Show	Buck Laughlin
2001	Ben Kingsley	Sexy Beast	Don Logan
2002	Alan Arkin	Thirteen Conversations About One Thing	Gene
2003	Peter Sarsgaard	Shattered Glass	Charles Lane
2004	Thomas Haden Church	Sideways	Jack Cole
2005	Paul Giamatti	Cinderella Man	Joe Gould
2006	Mark Wahlberg	The Departed	Staff Sgt. Sean Dignam
2007	Javier Bardem	No Country for Old Men	Anton Chigurh
2008	Heath Ledger (posthumous)	The Dark Knight	The Joker
2009	Christoph Waltz	Inglourious Basterds	Col. Hans Landa

=== 2010s ===
Year	Winner	Film	Role
2010	Christian Bale	The Fighter	Dicky Eklund
2011	Albert Brooks	Drive	Bernie Rose
2012	Ezra Miller	The Perks of Being a Wallflower	Patrick
2013	James Gandolfini (posthumous)	Enough Said	Albert
2014	J. K. Simmons	Whiplash	Terence Fletcher
2015	Mark Rylance	Bridge of Spies	Rudolf Abel
2016	Mahershala Ali	Moonlight	Juan
2017	Willem Dafoe	The Florida Project	Bobby Hicks
2018	Richard E. Grant	Can You Ever Forgive Me?	Jack Hock
2019	Brad Pitt	Once Upon a Time in Hollywood	Cliff Booth

=== 2020s ===
Year	Winner	Film	Role
2020	Paul Raci	Sound of Metal	Joe
2021	Troy Kotsur	CODA	Frank Rossi
2022	Ke Huy Quan	Everything Everywhere All At Once	Waymond Wang
2023	Ryan Gosling	Barbie	Ken
2024	Edward Norton	A Complete Unknown	Pete Seeger
2025	Stellan Skarsgård	Sentimental Value	Gustav Borg

== See also ==
- Academy Award for Best Supporting Actor
