= Jimmy Flynt =

Magazine co-founder

- Born: Jimmy Ray Flynt; May 20, 1948 (age 78); Salyersville, Magoffin County, Kentucky, U.S.
- Occupations: Owner, Flynt Sexy Gifts
- Children: Dustin Flynt; Jimmy Flynt II

Jimmy Ray Flynt (/flɪnt/; born June 20, 1948) is the co-founder of Hustler. Flynt has been tried alongside his brother Larry Flynt (1942–2021) in many battles involving the First Amendment − most notably in 1977 for obscenity charges in Cincinnati, Ohio. Larry was convicted; Jimmy was acquitted. Larry's conviction was later overturned.

== Early life ==
Jimmy Flynt was born on Lakeville Road, Salyersville, Magoffin County, Kentucky, the youngest of three children to Larry Claxton Flynt Sr. (August 16, 1919 – July 1, 2005), a sharecropper and a World War II veteran, and Edith Arnett (August 13, 1925 – March 29, 1982), a homemaker. He had two older siblings; sister Judy (1947–1951) and brother Larry Flynt (November 1, 1942 – February 10, 2021). His father served in the United States Army in the Pacific theatre of World War II.

== Career ==
=== Mini Clubs of America and Hustler ===
The Hustler Club originated in Dayton, Ohio, in 1967. Brothers Larry and Jimmy Flynt envisioned a chain of semi-private nightclubs which soon became a reality with the opening of the Hustler Clubs in Cincinnati and Columbus, Ohio, in January 1970 and July 1971 respectively. The Hustler Club chain expanded into Toledo, Akron, and Cleveland during the period between June 1972 and May 1973. Mini Clubs of America developed its own Magazine titled Hustler which began as a newsletter in January 1972. The monthly newsletter soon developed into a full-scale magazine sold on newsstands across the midwest; the Hustler was also sold in the clubs and mailed to over 10,000 club members with a readership of nearly 50,000 people, Hustler Magazine became an effective tool in the advertising and promotion of the Hustler Clubs.

On March 6, 1978, during a legal battle related to obscenity in Gwinnett County, Georgia, Larry Flynt and his local lawyer, Gene Reeves Jr., were shot by a sniper later revealed as Joseph Paul Franklin in an ambush near the county courthouse in Lawrenceville. The shooting left Larry partially paralyzed, with permanent spinal cord damage, and in need of a wheelchair. Three months later, Larry, Jimmy, and Larry's then-wife Althea Leasure were involved in a dispute over ownership of the Hustler enterprise. In settling this dispute, Jimmy accepted ownership of Hustler subcompany Leasure Time Products, which sent sex toys and lewd T-shirts through mail order. In November, LTP vice-president Bill Abrams was shot as he and Jimmy were leaving the Hustler building.

=== Flynt Sexy Gifts ===
In 2012, Jimmy Flynt created Flynt Sexy Gifts, a boutique with lines of clothing, lingerie, intimate lotions, oils and specialty items targeted towards women. The first shops were in Cincinnati, Ohio, and Florence, Kentucky, with a third opening in Naples, Florida in 2013.

== Politics ==
Flynt is a Democrat and has long been a staunch defender of privacy and free speech, and a frequent ally of the American Civil Liberties Union (ACLU) on those issues. Hustler Magazine has repeatedly weighed in on public debates by trying to expose conservative or republican politicians with sexual scandals. In 1998, during the impeachment proceedings against President Clinton, Hustler offered $1 million for each unflattering sexual story about Republican members of congress and published the results in The Flynt Report. Those publications led to the resignation of incoming House Speaker Bob Livingston.

== Legal ==
On February 8, 1977, Jimmy Flynt was acquitted of pandering obscenity and engaging in organized crime. Larry Flynt was convicted.

On April 7, 1998, Jimmy and Larry Flynt were indicted on 15 counts of pandering obscenity in Cincinnati, Ohio. They were accused of selling obscene videotapes and operating an illegal enterprise from their Hustler Store on Sixth Street. If convicted, they each faced more than 20 years in prison.

On May 20, 1998, the Flynt brothers got a new judge in their Cincinnati obscenity trial. Judge Patrick Dinkelacker of the Hamilton County Common Pleas Court was randomly selected to preside over the case.

On June 18, 2003, a judge was asked to decide whether Larry and Jimmy Flynt should face new criminal charges for breaking an old promise to stop selling sexually explicit videos in Hamilton County. In an unusual legal maneuver, Prosecutor Mike Allen sought to reinstate 15 felony charges that were originally filed against the Flynts in 1998.

On April 23, 2013, Judge Steven E. Martin ruled that Jimmy Flynt has a valid lease at his 411 Elm Street store, giving Flynt a victory over his brother, Hustler publisher Larry Flynt.

On April 2, 2004, the Ohio 1st District Court of Appeals ruled that Hamilton County could not reinstate old obscenity charges against Jimmy and Larry Flynt.

"When a case is over, it's over," wrote Judge Mark P. Painter in a decision handed down this morning.

It was in 1999 that the Flynts' attorneys reached an agreement with the county to release the Flynts from then-pending pandering obscenity charges by having their corporation, Hustler Gifts and News, be substituted as the defendant, plead guilty, pay a $10,000 fine and promise never to sell the charged videos in the store again.

But Allen claims that the store is once more selling sexually explicit tapes and DVDs in the county, that that's a violation of the plea agreement, and that the Flynts are liable for breaking the agreement.

According to the recorded transcript of the plea hearing, the prosecuting attorney stated that the agreement was, "Larry Flynt and Jimmy Flynt personally, and Hustler News and Gifts, Incorporated, corporately[,] agree to remove immediately, all existing videos from Hustler News and Gifts at 34 East 6th Street in Cincinnati, Ohio, and will not in the future, disseminate or cause to be disseminated, any sexually explicit videos in Hamilton County, Ohio... [And] if Larry Flynt or Jimmy Flynt or Hustler News and Gifts, Incorporated, violate[s] any of the terms of the agreement, the entire plea agreement becomes null and void, and all charges in the original indictment will be reinstated."

On October 12, 2011, Jimmy Flynt sued Flynt Management Group, LLC for wrongful termination. Jimmy Flynt contended he was the "brainchild" for the Hustler retail operations, "which has led to the second wave of growth for the Hustler Enterprise," according to his complaint.

== Achievements ==
On June 20, 2002, Jimmy was inducted by his brother into the Hustler Hollywood Walk of Fame on Sunset Boulevard. On January 7, 2005, Jimmy Flynt presented Harry Mohney with the Reuben Sturman Lifetime Achievement Award at the 2005 AVN Awards held at the Venetian Hotel Las Vegas.

In the 1996 film The People vs. Larry Flynt, Jimmy was played by Brett Harrelson, brother of the actor portraying Larry, Woody Harrelson.
