= The People vs. Larry Flynt =

1996 biographical film by Miloš Forman

- Theatrical release poster
- Directed by: Miloš Forman
- Written by: Scott Alexander; Larry Karaszewski
- Produced by: Oliver Stone; Janet Yang; Michael Hausman
- Starring: Woody Harrelson; Courtney Love; Edward Norton; Richard Paul
- Cinematography: Philippe Rousselot
- Edited by: Christopher Tellefsen
- Music by: Thomas Newman
- Production companies: Columbia Pictures; Phoenix Pictures; Ixtlan Productions
- Distributed by: Sony Pictures Releasing
- Release dates: October 13, 1996 (New York Film Festival); December 25, 1996 (Los Angeles); December 27, 1996 (New York City); January 10, 1997 (United States)
- Running time: 130 minutes
- Country: United States
- Language: English
- Budget: $35 million
- Box office: $43 million

The People vs. Larry Flynt is a 1996 American biographical comedy-drama film directed by Miloš Forman, written by Scott Alexander and Larry Karaszewski, and starring Woody Harrelson, Courtney Love, and Edward Norton. It spans approximately 35 years of the life of pornographer Larry Flynt (Harrelson), from his impoverished upbringing in Kentucky to his marriage to Althea Leasure (Love), the rise of Hustler magazine, and his 1988 United States Supreme Court battle with Reverend Jerry Falwell.

After premiering at the New York Film Festival in October 1996, The People vs. Larry Flynt was released theatrically on December 25, 1996. Despite limited success at the box office, the film was widely acclaimed by critics and garnered Harrelson, Love, Norton, and Forman numerous accolades, including a Best Actor nomination for Harrelson and Best Director nomination for Forman at the 69th Academy Awards. Forman won the Golden Globe Award for Best Director, while Harrelson and Love were nominated in the categories of Best Actor – Drama and Best Actress – Drama, respectively.

Though the film garnered largely favorable critical reviews, it was subject to a significant campaign condemning it, led by Gloria Steinem and other feminist groups, who regarded it as a glorification of Flynt and his alleged exploitation of women. Despite these accusations, the film was defended by free speech proponents and organizations, including the American Civil Liberties Union.

== Plot ==
In 1972, Larry Flynt and his younger brother, Jimmy, run the Hustler Go-Go, a struggling strip club in Cincinnati. In a bid to improve his business, Flynt decides to publish a newsletter for the club featuring nude photos of his strippers, which he names Hustler. The newsletter soon becomes a full-fledged magazine, but sales are weak. After Hustler publishes photos of former first lady Jackie Kennedy Onassis sunbathing nude in 1972, it becomes a national sensation, and Larry decides to focus on it full-time.

Flynt becomes smitten with Althea Leasure, a young bisexual dancer he allows to work despite her being underage. With his success comes enemies – as he finds himself a hated figure of anti-pornography activists. He argues with the activists, declaring that "murder is illegal, but if you take a picture of it, you may get your name in a magazine or maybe win a Pulitzer Prize. However, sex is legal, but if you take a picture of that act, you can go to jail." He becomes involved in several prominent court cases, and befriends his young and idealistic lawyer, Alan Isaacman.

In 1975, Flynt is convicted on pornography charges, but the decision is overturned on appeal; he is released from jail soon afterward. Ruth Carter Stapleton, a Christian activist and sister of President Jimmy Carter, seeks out Flynt and urges him to give his life to Jesus; this results in Flynt attempting to turn his life around and even push for Hustler to become a more tasteful publication in line with his competitors. However, Althea, who blames her molestation by nuns during her years in Catholic school for her problems, grows to resent him.

In 1978, during another trial in Georgia, Flynt and Isaacman are both shot by a man with a rifle while they walk outside a courthouse. Isaacman recovers, but Flynt is paralyzed from the waist down and uses a wheelchair for the rest of his life. Broken by the experience, Flynt renounces his faith, turns over control of Hustler to Jimmy and Althea, and moves to Beverly Hills, where he quickly spirals into drug addiction to combat his depression and crippling pain. In 1983, Flynt undergoes surgery to deaden several nerves in his back damaged by the bullet wounds, and as a result, feels rejuvenated. He soon returns to an active role with the publication.

Flynt is soon in court again for leaking videos relating to the John DeLorean entrapment case, and during his courtroom antics, he fires Isaacman, then throws an orange at the judge. He later wears an American flag as an adult diaper along with an Army helmet, and wears provocative T-shirts. After spitting water at the judge, Flynt is committed to a psychiatric ward, where he sinks into depression again. Flynt publishes a satirical parody ad in which Jerry Falwell tells of a drunken sexual encounter with his mother. Falwell sues for libel and emotional distress. Flynt countersues for copyright infringement, because Falwell copied his ad and used it to raise funds for his legal bills. The case goes to trial in December 1984, but the decision is mixed, as Flynt is found liable for inflicting emotional distress but not libel and is forced to pay damages to Falwell.

Althea, now a morphine addict, visits Flynt and reveals her AIDS diagnosis; disgusted to learn that the Hustler staff won't even shake her hand, Flynt arranges a company meeting via phone call and fires everyone. Althea comes to live with him, but later drowns in the bathtub after passing out. Flynt presses Isaacman to appeal the Falwell decision to the Supreme Court of the United States. Isaacman refuses, saying Flynt's courtroom antics humiliated him. Flynt pleads with him, saying that he "wants to be remembered for something meaningful". Isaacman finally agrees to represent him in front of the Supreme Court, in the case Hustler Magazine v. Falwell in December 1987. With Flynt sitting silently in the courtroom, the court overturns the original verdict in a unanimous decision. After the trial, Flynt sits alone in his bedroom, watching old home movies of a happy, healthy Althea and himself.

== Cast ==
- Woody Harrelson as Larry Flynt
  - Cody Block as young Larry
- Courtney Love as Althea Leasure
- Edward Norton as Alan Isaacman
- Brett Harrelson as Jimmy Flynt
  - Ryan Post as young Jimmy
- Donna Hanover as Ruth Carter Stapleton
- James Cromwell as Charles Keating
- Crispin Glover as Arlo
- Vincent Schiavelli as Chester
- Miles Chapin as Miles
- James Carville as Simon Leis
- Richard Paul as Jerry Falwell
- Burt Neuborne as Roy Grutman
- Jan Tříska as Joseph Paul Franklin
- Nancy Lea Owen as Edith Flynt
  - Kacky Walton as young Edith
- John Fergus Ryan as Larry Flynt Sr.
  - John Ryan as young Larry Sr.
- Ruby Wilson as Singer at Rally
- Norm Macdonald as Network Reporter
- Aurélia Thierrée as Receptionist
- D'Army Bailey as Judge Mantke
- Larry Flynt as Judge Morrissey

== Production ==
=== Casting ===
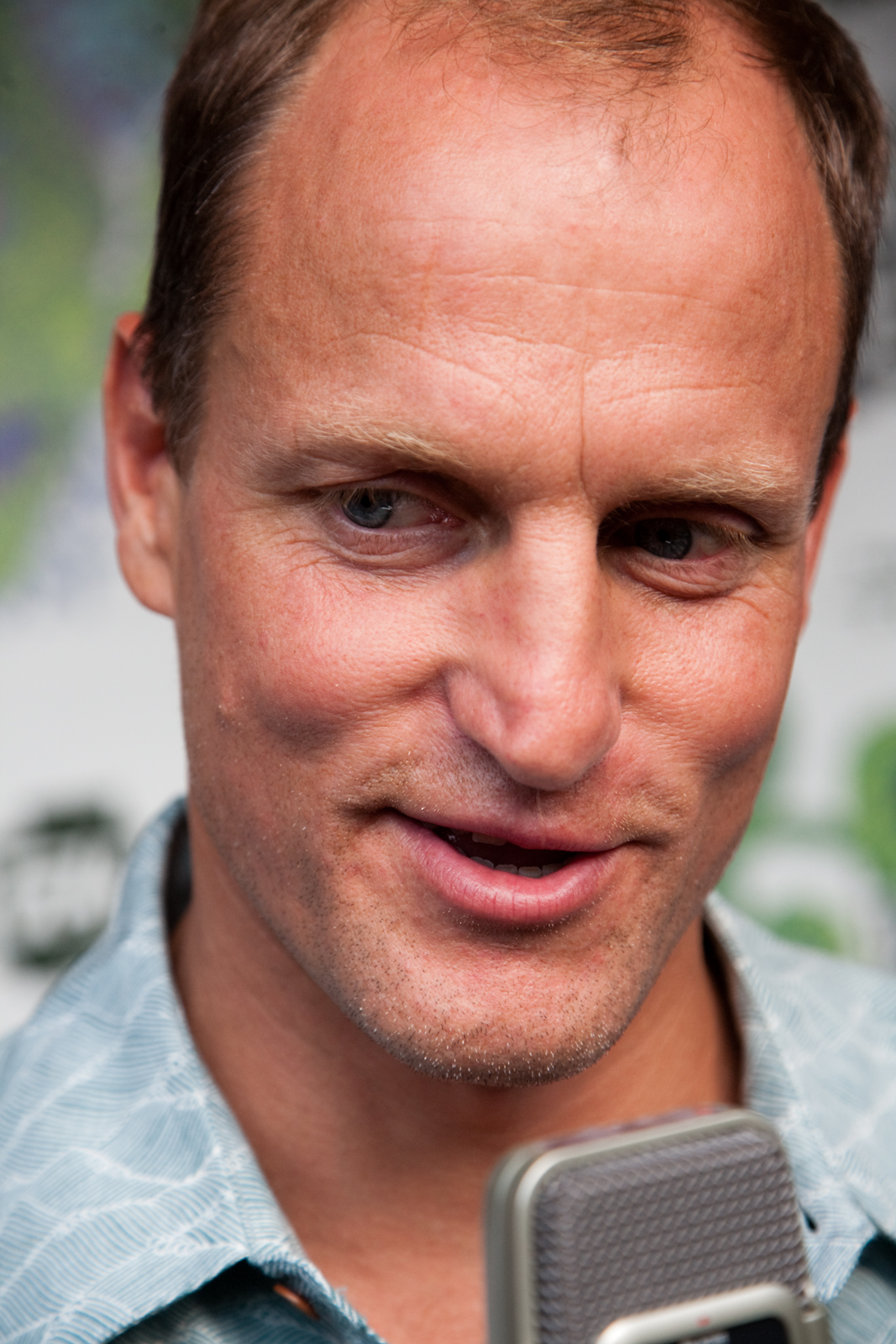
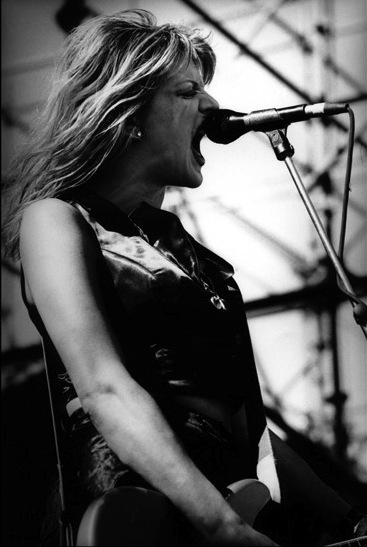
Woody Harrelson (pictured in 2009) and Courtney Love (pictured in 1995) were cast as Larry Flynt and Althea Leasure, respectively.

Both Bill Murray and Tom Hanks were considered for the role of Larry Flynt before Woody Harrelson was cast. Commenting on portraying Flynt, Harrelson said: "I really came to like him, I don't think I would've been much into doing the movie if I hadn't come to respect Larry. I don't respect much the pornography part of what he does, but what he is as a person, and the rebel that he is." Flynt's brother, Jimmy, is played by Brett Harrelson, the real-life brother of Woody Harrelson. William J. Morrissey Jr., a Cincinnati court judge who sentenced Flynt in 1977, is played in the film by Larry Flynt himself.

Forman auditioned numerous actresses for the role of Flynt's wife, Althea Leasure. Rachel Griffiths, Georgina Cates, Patricia Arquette, Mira Sorvino, and Courtney Love were all considered for the part, though Forman narrowed the selection down to Griffiths, Cates, and Love. Love, primarily known as the lead singer and guitarist of the alternative rock band Hole, was an active heroin and narcotics user at the time and had recently completed a world tour supporting the band's second album, which was widely publicized due to a series of legal issues and her unpredictable behavior.

Forman recalled a conversation with Love during the casting process: "[I told her] 'Listen, you are my first choice. I will fight for you if you can give me your word that you will not betray me. And it's not that I will stop loving you—I will love you even if you betray me, but I wouldn't cast you if you can't promise me that.' And she promised." Despite hesitation from Columbia Pictures executives, Love's casting was announced in late 1995. After the studio's insurance company refused to insure Love, Forman, producers Janet Yang and Oliver Stone, co-star Harrelson, and Love herself split the cost of an insurance policy amounting to $750,000. As a provision, she was ordered to take multiple supervised urine tests while filming, which she passed. "Miloš made me give him my word that I would never do heroin again," Love said. "I went to rehab just to two the twelve-step thing and do the twenty eight days, but I never did heroin again, and I did no drugs on the set of that film." She also went on a diet and lost 20 pounds (9.1 kg) at Forman's suggestion.

Edward Norton, who had recently received critical acclaim for his portrayal of a psychopath in Primal Fear (1996), was cast in the role of Flynt's attorney, Alan Isaacman. Norton and co-star Love began dating after making the film, and were a couple for approximately three years.

=== Filming ===
Principal photography of The People vs. Larry Flynt began in February 1996, with location shooting occurring in Memphis, Tennessee. Additional filming took place in Bel Air, Los Angeles at a private residence which was used as Flynt's lavish home.

== Release ==
=== Marketing ===
Columbia Pictures' original poster art for the film was censored in the United States by the Motion Picture Association of America and withdrawn from circulation. The image featured a doll-sized Flynt (Harrelson) imposed over the groin below a female's abdomen, posed with his arms outstretched and wearing an American flag around his waist. Producer Janet Yang commented, "It was the mixture of the religious and the sexual. It was a very strong graphic. It reflects sex—even though the film really isn't titillating—and sacrilege. It really does say it all."

As a replacement, a headshot of Flynt bearing an American flag over his mouth was used for the film's redesigned poster in the United States. Despite its censorship domestically, the image was used as the film's main promotional poster artwork internationally, and was also used for the film's special edition DVD release in 2003, though it was obscured by a semi-translucent slipcover for the latter.

In France, a group made up of 31 Catholics and a conservative organization attempted to have the poster banned on grounds of obscenity, but a Paris court refused to censor the poster.

=== Theatrical run ===
The People vs. Larry Flynt premiered at the New York Film Festival on October 13, 1996. It subsequently received a limited theatrical release, opening in Los Angeles on December 25, 1996, and in New York City on December 27. The film's release expanded wide to 1,233 venues on January 10, 1997.

=== Home media ===
Sony Pictures Home Entertainment released a special edition DVD in 2003. A Blu-ray edition was later issued by Sony on August 27, 2019.

Arrow Video released a limited edition 4K UHD Blu-ray on August 4, 2026.

== Reception ==
=== Box office ===
The film grossed $20,300,385 in the United States and Canada. The film grossed $23 million internationally, for a worldwide total of $43 million against a $35 million budget.

=== Critical response ===
Based on 61 reviews collected by Rotten Tomatoes, the film has an overall approval rating of 89%, with an average score of 7.6/10. The site's consensus states, "The People vs. Larry Flynt pays entertaining tribute to an irascible iconoclast with a well-constructed biopic that openly acknowledges his troublesome flaws." On Metacritic, the film has a weighted average score of 79 out of 100 based on reviews from 24 critics, indicating "generally favorable reviews". Audiences polled by CinemaScore gave the film an average grade of "B+" on an A+ to F scale.

Roger Ebert of the Chicago Sun-Times awarded the film four out of four stars, particularly praising the lead performances of Harrelson and Love: "[Althea] is made by Love into a kind of life force, misdirected but uncompromised. It is quite a performance; Love proves she is not a rock star pretending to act, but a true actress, and Harrelson matches her with his portrait of a man who has one thing on his mind, and never changes it." Ebert included the film in his 1996 essay on his favorite films of the year, reiterating Love's "virtuoso performance."

Janet Maslin of The New York Times particularly praised the film's cinematography and performances, summarizing it as "a blazing, unlikely triumph about a man who is nobody's idea of a movie hero. Smart, funny, shamelessly entertaining and perfectly serious too, Milos Forman's film describes the Hustler publisher and his many liberties, civil and otherwise. Above all, the film emerges as an object lesson in open-mindedness, winning a reluctant respect for its main character's right to crude self-expression." The Washington Post's Rita Kempley described the film as "an enormously entertaining and surprisingly touching bio-pic... Screenwriters Scott Alexander and Larry Karaszewski don't depict their antihero as an angel, but they do revel in his vulgar invention, much as their screenplay Ed Wood gloried in the bad taste of the world's worst director." Jane Horwitz of The Ann Arbor News also commented on the film's comedic appeal, deeming it "a cracklingly smart, funny and surprisingly patriotic ode to free speech and rugged individualism."

Charles Taylor of Salon gave the film a mixed review, describing its screenplay as "frequently funny and wildly uneven" and deeming Forman "a rhythmless director. To be fair, there may be nowhere for this story to go but down, what with the attack that leaves Larry paralyzed and the AIDS death of his junkie-stripper wife Althea, played by Courtney Love. But a filmmaker with a little more flair might have given us the weirdly affecting love story between Larry and Althea without derailing the satirical gusto of the first half. And one with more sensitivity might have treated Courtney Love's first major role with more care."

=== Controversy ===
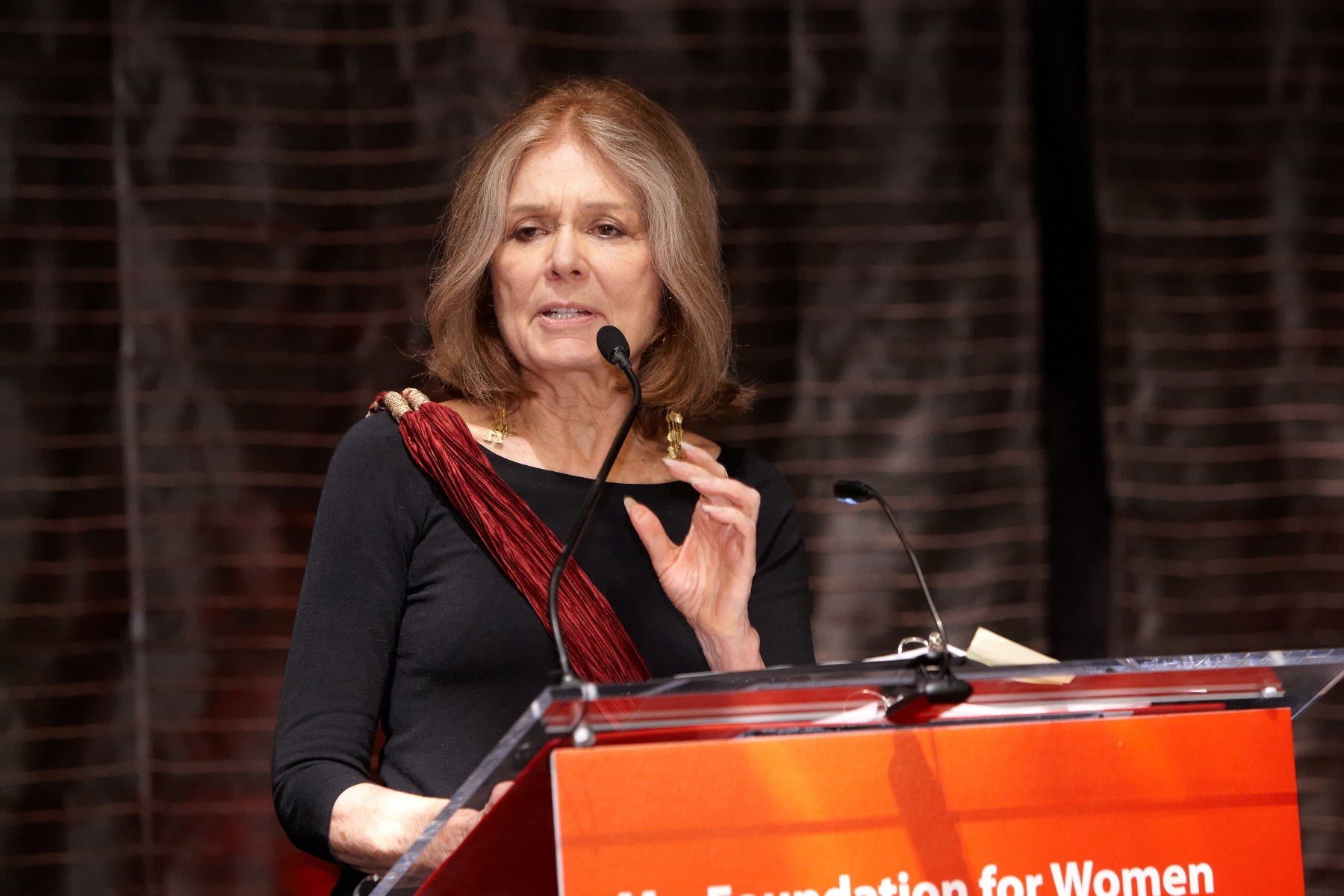
Feminist Gloria Steinem publicly criticized the film.

Feminist Gloria Steinem criticised the sanitized portrayal of Flynt, stating "What's left out [of the film] are the magazine's images of women being beaten, tortured, and raped; women subject to degradations from bestiality to sexual slavery." Steinem published an op-ed in the January 7, 1997 edition of The New York Times further condemning the film, three days before its theatrical release was to be expanded in the United States. On January 8, she appeared on a segment of Charlie Rose with Flynt's daughter, Tonya, speaking out against the film.

On January 10, 1997, Steinem published another newspaper column attacking the film and discouraging voters at the Academy Awards from nominating it for any accolades. This article was reprinted ten days later in a Variety advertisement, funded by Steinem under the auspices of Ralph Nader's Public Citizen foundation. Later that month, the American Civil Liberties Union purchased an advertisement in Variety in response to Steinem's ad campaign, praising the film's director, Miloš Forman, as a "First Amendment advocate and an artist of unsurpassed creativity, ability and courage."

Columbia Pictures executives partly blamed the criticisms of the film by Steinem and other feminists for its mediocre commercial performance. Lisa Henson, a former president of Columbia Pictures, responded to Steinem's critique of the film: "It’s horrifying to think that the intelligentsia would turn against an intelligent film like this one... To go and urge people not to vote for the movie for Academy Awards... well, that means we can just look forward to more stupid portrayals of women in the movies." Janet Yang, one of the film's producers, found the criticisms of the film hypocritical, commenting: "If the attack had been coming from the right, it would have been easy for Hollywood to ignore. But it’s very damning to use words that apply political correctness to this debate."

In February 1997, screenwriter Robin Swicord published a satirical essay condemning the film in the left-wing magazine CounterPunch, titled A Modest Proposal for a Sequel to 'Larry Flynt' (a reference to Jonathan Swift's 1729 satirical essay, A Modest Proposal). In response to Swicord, Yang published an article defending the film in the February 24, 1997 edition of the Los Angeles Times, writing:

The People vs. Larry Flynt is interesting drama because it is about the best and worst of America. It is about complex characters with interesting dilemmas. Do I need tell that to a screenwriter? Does she have the word “antihero” in her vocabulary? Although I have never met her, she knows well other women who were closely involved in the making of this movie, many of whom are considered to be, and consider themselves to be, ardent supporters of women’s rights. Why has she not come to us in person so that we can discuss her opinions, woman to woman? We would be happy to engage in a serious debate with her rather than simply read a sophomoric parodying of the movie.

Courtney Love reflected on the film's controversy in a 2005 interview with Spin magazine, stating: "I'll always be a feminist. But let me tell you something: Gloria Steinem never helped me out. Larry Flynt did."

=== Accolades ===
==== Year-end lists ====
- 1st – Doug Nye, The State
- 1st – Peter Travers, Rolling Stone
- 3rd – John Hurley, Staten Island Advance
- 5th – Joe Baltake, The Sacramento Bee
- 5th – Amy Longsdorf, Courier-Post
- 5th – Joyce J. Perisco, The Trenton Times
- 5th – Michael H. Price, Fort Worth Star-Telegram
- 6th – Peter Birnie, Vancouver Sun
- 6th – Edward Guthmann, San Francisco Chronicle
- 7th – Jack Garner, Gannett News Service
- 7th – Betsy Pickle, The Elkhart Truth
- 8th – Lee Bacchus, Vancouver Province
- 9th – William Arnold, Seattle Post-Intelligencer
- 9th – Owen Gleiberman, Entertainment Weekly
- 10th – Bob Campbell, The Star-Ledger
- Top 10 (listed alphabetically, not ranked) – Mike Clark, The San Bernardino County Sun
- Top 10 (listed alphabetically, not ranked) – Susan Granger, Westport News

==== Awards and nominations ====
Award/association	Year	Category	Recipient	Result	Ref.
20/20 Awards	1997	Best Director	Miloš Forman	Nominated	
20/20 Awards	1997	Best Actor	Woody Harrelson	Nominated	
Academy Awards	1997	Best Director	Miloš Forman	Nominated	
Academy Awards	1997	Best Actor	Woody Harrelson	Nominated	
AFI's 10 Top 10	2008	Courtroom Drama Film		Nominated	
Artios Awards	1997	Outstanding Achievement in Feature Film Casting – Drama	Francine Maisler and Jo Doster (location casting)	Won	
Awards Circuit Community Awards	1997	Best Director	Miloš Forman	Nominated	
Awards Circuit Community Awards	1997	Best Actor in a Leading Role	Woody Harrelson	Nominated	
Awards Circuit Community Awards	1997	Best Actress in a Supporting Role	Courtney Love	Nominated	
Awards Circuit Community Awards	1997	Best Original Screenplay	Miloš Forman	Nominated	
Awards Circuit Community Awards	1997	Honorable Mentions (The Next Ten Best Picture Contenders)	Miloš Forman	Nominated	
Berlin International Film Festival	1997	Golden Bear	Miloš Forman	Won	
Boston Society of Film Critics	1997	Best Supporting Actor	Edward Norton	Won	
Boston Society of Film Critics	1997	Best Supporting Actress	Courtney Love	Won	
Chicago Film Critics Association	1997	Best Film		Nominated	
Chicago Film Critics Association	1997	Best Director	Miloš Forman	Nominated	
Chicago Film Critics Association	1997	Best Actress	Courtney Love	Nominated	
Chicago Film Critics Association	1997	Best Screenplay	Scott Alexander; Larry Karaszewski	Nominated	
Chicago Film Critics Association	1997	Most Promising Actor	Edward Norton	Won	
Chicago Film Critics Association	1997	Most Promising Actress	Courtney Love	Won	
Critics' Choice Awards	1997	Best Picture		Nominated	
Critics' Choice Awards	1997	Best Supporting Actor	Edward Norton	Nominated	
Critics' Choice Awards	1997	Best Supporting Actress	Courtney Love	Nominated	
Czech Lion Awards	1997	Best Foreign Film		Nominated	
European Film Awards	1997	Achievement in World Cinema Award	Miloš Forman	Won	
Florida Film Critics Circle Awards	1997	Best Supporting Actor	Edward Norton	Won	
Florida Film Critics Circle Awards	1997	Best Supporting Actress	Courtney Love	Won	
Golden Globe Awards	1997	Best Motion Picture – Drama		Nominated	
Golden Globe Awards	1997	Best Actor in a Motion Picture – Drama	Woody Harrelson	Nominated	
Golden Globe Awards	1997	Best Actress in a Motion Picture – Drama	Courtney Love	Nominated	
Golden Globe Awards	1997	Best Director – Motion Picture	Miloš Forman	Won	
Golden Globe Awards	1997	Best Screenplay – Motion Picture	Scott Alexander; Larry Karaszewski	Won	
Kansas City Film Critics Circle Awards	1997	Best Film		Won	
Karlovy Vary International Film Festival	1997	Crystal Globe – Outstanding Artistic Contribution to World Cinema	Miloš Forman	Won	
Los Angeles Film Critics Association	1997	Best Supporting Actor	Edward Norton	Won	
Los Angeles Film Critics Association	1997	Best Supporting Actress	Courtney Love	Runner-up	
MTV Movie Awards	1997	Best Breakthrough Performance	Courtney Love	Nominated	
National Board of Review	1997	Top Ten Films		10th Place	
National Board of Review	1997	Freedom of Expression	Miloš Forman and Oliver Stone	Won	
National Society of Film Critics	1997	Best Supporting Actor	Edward Norton	3rd Place	
New York Film Critics Circle	1997	Best Film		Runner-up	
New York Film Critics Circle	1997	Best Supporting Actress	Courtney Love	Won	
Online Film & Television Association Awards	1997	Best Picture	Oliver Stone; Janet Yang; Michael Hausman	Nominated	
Online Film & Television Association Awards	1997	Best Drama Picture	Oliver Stone; Janet Yang; Michael Hausman	Nominated	
Online Film & Television Association Awards	1997	Best Director	Miloš Forman	Nominated	
Online Film & Television Association Awards	1997	Best Actor	Woody Harrelson	Nominated	
Online Film & Television Association Awards	1997	Best Drama Actor	Woody Harrelson	Nominated	
Online Film & Television Association Awards	1997	Best Drama Actress	Courtney Love	Nominated	
Online Film & Television Association Awards	1997	Best Supporting Actress	Courtney Love	Won	
Online Film & Television Association Awards	1997	Best Screenplay – Written Directly for the Screen	Scott Alexander; Larry Karaszewski	Nominated	
Political Film Society Awards	1997	Exposé		Nominated	
Political Film Society Awards	1997	Human Rights		Nominated	
Satellite Awards	1997	Best Supporting Actress in a Motion Picture – Drama	Courtney Love	Won	
Satellite Awards	1997	Best Screenplay – Original	Scott Alexander and Larry Karaszewski	Won (Note: Tied with John Sayles for Lone Star.)	
Screen Actors Guild Awards	1997	Outstanding Performance by a Male Actor in a Leading Role	Woody Harrelson	Nominated	
Society of Texas Film Critics	1997	Best Actor	Woody Harrelson	Nominated	
Society of Texas Film Critics	1997	Best Supporting Actor	Edward Norton	Won	
Southeastern Film Critics Association Awards	1997	Best Supporting Actor	Edward Norton	Won	
Writers Guild of America	1997	Paul Selvin Honorary Award	Scott Alexander; Larry Karaszewski	Nominated	

== See also ==
- Supreme Court of the United States in fiction

== Sources ==
- Roshan, Maer (2012). Courtney Comes Clean: The High Life and Dark Depths of Music's Most Controversial Icon. A Quick Fix Book. New York City, New York: Sterling. ISBN 978-1-4027-9791-0.
