= Chicago Film Critics Association Awards 1996 =

Annual US film awards ceremony

9th CFCA Awards
March 10, 1997

Best Film:
Fargo

The 9th Chicago Film Critics Association Awards, given on 10 March 1997, honored the finest achievements in 1996 filmmaking.

== Winners ==
- Best Actor:
  - Billy Bob Thornton - Sling Blade
- Best Actress:
  - Frances McDormand - Fargo
- Best Cinematography:
  - The English Patient
- Best Director:
  - Joel Coen - Fargo
- Best Film:
  - Fargo
- Best Foreign Language Film:
  - Dekalog (The Decalogue), Poland
- Best Score:
  - "Fargo" - Carter Burwell
- Best Screenplay:
  - Fargo - Joel Coen and Ethan Coen
- Best Supporting Actor:
  - Cuba Gooding Jr. - Jerry Maguire
- Best Supporting Actress:
  - Irma Hall - A Family Thing
- Most Promising Actor:
  - Edward Norton - Primal Fear, Everyone Says I Love You and The People vs. Larry Flynt
- Most Promising Actress:
  - Courtney Love - The People vs. Larry Flynt
