= Show of Evil =

1995 novel by William Diehl

- Author: William Diehl
- Language: English
- Genre: Thriller
- Publisher: Villard
- Publication date: 1995
- Publication place: United States
- Media type: Print (hardback & paperback)
- Preceded by: Primal Fear
- Followed by: Reign in Hell

Show of Evil is a 1995 thriller novel by American writer William Diehl, the sequel to Primal Fear.

== Plot ==
Ten years after saving Aaron Stampler from the death penalty, Martin Vail - now a district attorney - is plagued by his client-turned-nemesis once again when a series of murder victims turn up with mysterious ties to the erstwhile serial killer.
