= Simon L. Leis Jr. =

American lawyer (1934–2026)

Hamilton County Prosecuting Attorney
- In office January 4, 1971 – January 3, 1983
- Preceded by: Arthur M. Ney Jr.
- Succeeded by: Melvin G. Rueger

Personal details
- Born: June 12, 1934 Hamilton County, Ohio, U.S.
- Died: June 27, 2026 (aged 92) Cincinnati, Ohio, U.S.

Simon L. Leis Jr. (/liːs/; June 12, 1934 – June 27, 2026) was an American lawyer and local official from Cincinnati, Ohio. He served as County Prosecutor for Hamilton County (1971–1983), a judge in the Hamilton County Court of Common Pleas (1983–1987), and the county sheriff (1987–2012).

== Life and career ==
Leis was the son of Simon Leis Sr., a judge in Common Pleas Court. The younger Leis graduated from St. Xavier High School in 1952. After graduating from Xavier University, he served in the U.S. Marines, then studied law in night courses at the Salmon P. Chase College of Law (now part of Northern Kentucky University). He was admitted to the bar and began the practice of law as an assistant in the prosecutor's office.

In 1971 Simon was appointed County Prosecutor to replace Melvin Reuger, who had resigned to become a judge. He won re-election three times and served until 1983. His term as prosecutor was marked by several events. His 1974 disclosures during a prostitution investigation forced the resignation of City Councilman Jerry Springer (although Springer was elected again and later became mayor).

He led two high-profile trials, both times earning a conviction, and both later overturned by appellate courts. In 1976 he convicted Cincinnati's police chief, Carl Goodin, of taking kick-backs. In 1977 he convicted Larry Flynt, the publisher of Hustler magazine, on obscenity charges. This second case was the basis for a 1996 movie, The People vs. Larry Flynt, in which his role was played by political operative James Carville.

Leis retired as Hamilton County Sheriff in 2012, and was succeeded by Jim Neil.

Leis died of complications from pneumonia and cancer in Cincinnati, on June 27, 2026, at the age of 92.
