= 1996 National Society of Film Critics Awards =

Annual US film awards ceremony

31st NSFC Awards

January 5, 1997

Best Film:
Breaking the Waves

The 31st National Society of Film Critics Awards, given by the National Society of Film Critics on January 5, 1997, honored the best in film for 1996.

== Winners ==
=== Best Picture ===
1. Breaking the Waves
2. Secrets & Lies
3. Dead Man

=== Best Director ===
1. Lars von Trier – Breaking the Waves
2. Mike Leigh – Secrets & Lies
3. Jim Jarmusch – Dead Man

=== Best Actor ===
1. Eddie Murphy – The Nutty Professor
2. Vincent D'Onofrio – The Whole Wide World
3. Geoffrey Rush – Shine

=== Best Actress ===
1. Emily Watson – Breaking the Waves
2. Brenda Blethyn – Secrets & Lies
3. Frances McDormand – Fargo
3. Lili Taylor – I Shot Andy Warhol

=== Best Supporting Actor ===
1. Martin Donovan – The Portrait of a Lady
1. Tony Shalhoub – Big Night
3. Edward Norton – Everyone Says I Love You, The People vs. Larry Flynt and Primal Fear

=== Best Supporting Actress ===
1. Barbara Hershey – The Portrait of a Lady
2. Renée Zellweger – Jerry Maguire
3. Kristin Scott Thomas – The English Patient

=== Best Screenplay ===
1. Albert Brooks and Monica Johnson – Mother
2. Joseph Tropiano and Stanley Tucci – Big Night
3. David O. Russell – Flirting with Disaster

=== Best Cinematography ===
1. Robby Müller – Breaking the Waves and Dead Man
2. Chris Menges – Michael Collins
3. John Seale – The English Patient

=== Best Foreign Language Film ===
1. La Cérémonie
2. Lamerica
3. Chungking Express (Chung Hing sam lam)

=== Best Documentary ===
1. When We Were Kings
2. Anne Frank Remembered
3. Paradise Lost: The Child Murders at Robin Hood Hills

=== Special Citation ===
- James Katz and Robert A. Harris for their restoration of Alfred Hitchcock's classic film Vertigo.
