= Boston Society of Film Critics Awards 1996 =

Awards by film critics

17th BSFC Awards

December 13, 1996

Best Film:
Trainspotting

The 17th Boston Society of Film Critics Awards honored the best filmmaking of 1996. The awards were given on 13 December 1996.

== Winners ==
- Best Film:
  - Trainspotting
- Best Actor:
  - Geoffrey Rush – Shine
- Best Actress:
  - Brenda Blethyn – Secrets & Lies
- Best Supporting Actor:
  - Edward Norton – The People vs. Larry Flynt, Primal Fear and Everyone Says I Love You
- Best Supporting Actress:
  - Courtney Love – The People vs. Larry Flynt
- Best Director:
  - Mike Leigh – Secrets & Lies
- Best Screenplay:
  - Stanley Tucci and Joseph Tropiano – Big Night
- Best Cinematography:
  - John Seale – The English Patient
- Best Documentary:
  - Anne Frank Remembered
- Best Foreign-Language Film:
  - My Favorite Season (Ma saison préférée) • France
- Best New Filmmaker:
  - Campbell Scott and Stanley Tucci – Big Night
