= Satellite Award for Best DVD Extras =

Retired annual media award

The Satellite Award for Best DVD Extras was an award given by the International Press Academy from 2003 to 2010 and in 2012.

== Winners and nominees ==
Year	Winners and nominees	
2003	Minority Report	For the documentary.
2003	The Last Waltz	For the commentary.
2003	The Lord of the Rings: The Fellowship of the Ring	For the commentary.
2003	The Producers	For the documentary.
2003	Singin' in the Rain	For the commentary.
2004	Finding Nemo	
2004	Firefly	
2004	Alien, Aliens, Alien^{3}, and Alien: Resurrection	For "The Alien Quadrilogy".
2004	The Lord of the Rings: The Two Towers	For the Special Extended Edition.
2004	Raiders of the Lost Ark, Indiana Jones and the Temple of Doom, and Indiana Jones and the Last Crusade	For "The Adventures of Indiana Jones" set.
2004	Willard	
2005	Maria Full of Grace	For the documentary.
2005	Angel	For season 4. For the commentary.
2005	Buffy the Vampire Slayer	For season 6. For the commentary.
2005	La Dolce Vita	For the commentary.
2005	Easy Rider	For the documentary.
2005	Ed Wood	For the commentary.
2005	Friday the 13th, Friday the 13th Part 2, Friday the 13th Part III, Friday the 13th: The Final Chapter, Friday the 13th: A New Beginning, Friday the 13th Part VI: Jason Lives, Friday the 13th Part VII: The New Blood, and Friday the 13th Part VIII: Jason Takes Manhattan	For the Friday the 13th - From Crystal Lake to Manhattan collection. For the documentaries.
2005	The Girl Next Door	For the commentary.
2005	Showgirls	For the packaging.
2005	Spider-Man 2	
2006	Titanic	Special Collector's Edition.
2006	Airplane!	"Don't Call Me Shirley" Edition.
2006	The Big Lebowski	Widescreen Collector's Edition.
2006	Crash	Widescreen Edition.
2006	King Kong, The Son of Kong, and Mighty Joe Young	For the King Kong Collection (2-Disc Special Edition).
2006	Office Space	Special Edition With Flair!
2006	Oldboy	
2006	Saw	Uncut Edition.
2006	Sin City	Re-Cut & Extended Edition.
2006	The Wizard of Oz	Three Disc Collector's Edition.
2007	Mission: Impossible III	
2007	Harry Potter and the Philosopher's Stone, Harry Potter and the Chamber of Secrets, Harry Potter and the Prisoner of Azkaban, and Harry Potter and the Goblet of Fire	For "Harry Potter Years 1-4".
2007	The Chronicles of Narnia: The Lion, the Witch and the Wardrobe	
2007	Corpse Bride	
2007	The Da Vinci Code	
2007	Good Night, and Good Luck	
2007	The New World	
2007	The Omen	
2007	The Poseidon Adventure	
2007	The Towering Inferno	
2008	Borat; Masters of Horror	For season 1.
2008	The Sergio Leone Anthology.	
2008	Viva Pedro - The Almodóvar Collection/Volver.	
2008	Fiddler on the Roof	For the collector's edition.
2008	Flashdance	For the special collector's edition.
2008	The Graduate	For the 40th anniversary edition.
2008	RoboCop	For the 20th anniversary edition.
2008	The Silence of the Lambs	For the collector's edition.
2008	Wall Street	For the 20th anniversary edition.
2009	Iron Man	Two-Disc Collector's Edition
2009	High Noon	Two-Disc Ultimate Collector's Edition
2009	Across the Universe	
2009	Gone Baby Gone	
2009	The Assassination of Jesse James by the Coward Robert Ford	
2009	Into the Wild	
2009	4 Months, 3 Weeks and 2 Days	
2009	Eight Men Out	
2009	The Bank Job	
2009	WALL-E	Three-Disc Special Edition DVD
2010	Yentl	Two Disc Director's Extended Edition
2010	Primal Fear	Primal Fear - Hard Evidence Edition
2010	Dexter	Dexter - The Complete Third Season
2010	Up	Two Disc Deluxe Edition
2010	Hogan's Heroes	Hogan's Heroes: The Komplete Edition - Kommandant's Kollection
2010	Downhill Racer	
2012	Star Wars: Episode I – The Phantom Menace, Star Wars: Episode II – Attack of the Clones, Star Wars: Episode III – Revenge of the Sith, Star Wars: Episode IV – A New Hope, Star Wars: Episode V – The Empire Strikes Back, and Star Wars: Episode VI – Return of the Jedi	Star Wars: The Complete Saga
2012	Das Boot	Two-Disc Collector's Set
2012	Super 8	Two-Disc Edition
2012	Planet Earth	Limited Edition
2012	Blue Velvet	
