= Primal Fear (novel) =

1993 American thriller novel by William Diehl

- Author: William Diehl
- Language: English
- Genre: Thriller
- Publisher: Villard
- Publication date: January 1993
- Publication place: United States
- Media type: Print (hardback & paperback)
- ISBN: 0-679-40211-X (first edition, hardback)
- OCLC: 25632732
- Dewey Decimal: 813/.54 20
- LC Class: PS3554.I345 P75 1993
- Followed by: Show of Evil

Primal Fear is a 1993 American thriller novel by William Diehl about Aaron Stampler, an altar boy accused of murder, and Martin Vail, the attorney defending him.

It was adapted into the 1996 film of the same name, starring Richard Gere and Edward Norton.

The characters of Stampler and Vail appear in two additional novels by author Diehl, Show of Evil and Reign in Hell.

== Plot ==
Martin Vail, a lawyer of "bad-boy" fame, is defending Aaron Stampler, who is seen standing with a bloody knife when the Archbishop of Chicago was murdered. Knowing he will lose, Vail uses his unorthodox skills to take legal advantage.
