= Jamiel Chagra =

American criminal (1944–2008)

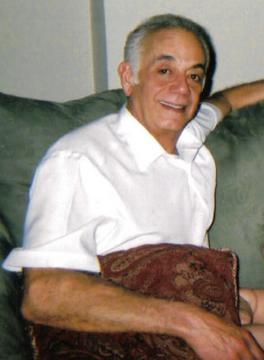
- Born: Jamiel Alexander Chagra; December 7, 1944; El Paso, Texas, US
- Died: July 25, 2008 (aged 63); Mesa, Arizona, US
- Other name: James Madrid
- Spouse(s): Grace Chagra (divorced); Elizabeth Chagra (deceased); Vivian Chagra (divorced); Lynda (Chagra) Madrid
- Children: Jimmy, Justin, Jackie, Catherine, Csilla, Christa, Cindy
- Parent(s): Abdou Joseph Chagra; Josephine Ayoub
- Status: Released after serving 24 years
- Criminal charge: Drug trafficking
- Penalty: 30 years imprisonment

Chagra Network
- Years active: 1969 - 1981
- Territory: Los Angeles, Las Vegas, El Paso, Santa Fe, New Mexico, Tucson, Arizona
- Ethnicity: Lebanese, Mexican, American of caucasian decent
- Membership: several dozen members and associates
- Activities: drug trafficking, money laundering, gambling, contract killing
- Allies: Bonanno crime family, Patriarca crime family, Medellin Cartel, Cali Cartel, Guadalajara Cartel, Gulf Cartel, Lebanese mafia

Jamiel "Jimmy" Alexander Chagra (December 7, 1944 – July 25, 2008) was an American drug trafficker, carpet salesman and professional gambler. He admitted to a role in the May 1979 assassination of United States District Judge John H. Wood Jr. in San Antonio, Texas.

Chagra was active as a trafficker of marijuana beginning in the 1960s, and by the 1970s was a well-known drug trafficker operating out of Las Vegas and El Paso. He was described as having been "no less than the biggest marijuana smuggler in the country" during that time. According to George Knapp writing for Las Vegas CityLife, he was "the undisputed marijuana kingpin of the Western world. He imported more high-grade ganja than anyone, tons at a time, planeload after planeload."

== Early life ==
Jamiel Chagra, known as Jimmy, was born in El Paso, Texas on December 7, 1944. Jimmy was born the middle son of a Lebanese rug merchant family. His mother was named Josephine, and his father Abdou Chagra. He had two brothers, Lee and Joseph, who were both attorneys involved with the legal defense of drug smugglers. Jimmy Chagra also had a sister named Patsy. Their family name was historically "Busha’ada", but Jimmy's grandfather changed it. His grandfather was imprisoned before Jimmy was born, and the family immigrated to El Paso from Mexico.

Jimmy got into drug smuggling in 1969 and became one of the largest smugglers in the United States, trafficking drugs from Mexico and Colombia by plane and boat. He had dealings with the Patriarca crime family and Joseph Bonanno, the retired head of the Bonanno crime family. Chagra was also a heavy gambler in Las Vegas, Nevada, and attracted attention with his flamboyant ways. Reportedly, he used gambling as a method of laundering money he received through trafficking drugs.

Prior to his arrest, his accumulated wealth was estimated at approximately $100 million ($500 million today, when adjusted for inflation), held in various bank accounts, and included his $1 million mansion in Las Vegas, Nevada.

Chagra's drug dealings came under close scrutiny by law enforcement and the judicial system. On November 21, 1978, Assistant U.S. Attorney James Kerr was ambushed and shot at near his home by two men who fired 19 bullets at his car. Kerr escaped with only minor glass cuts. Kerr had been involved with pursuing Chagra for his drug dealings.

On December 23, 1978, Lee Chagra was shot and killed in his law office in El Paso. Lee had been involved with Jimmy's drug smuggling, and the killers took $450,000 that was owed to Joe Bonanno for a drug deal. A few months later, Luis "Lou" Fred Esper, a small-time drug dealer and acquaintance of Lee Chagra, and two U.S. Army soldiers from Fort Bliss were held on various charges related to the murder of Lee. The soldiers implicated Esper in planning the heist, but he received a considerably lighter sentence than they due to not being technically involved with the murder itself.

== Murder of Judge John H. Wood ==
Chagra's downfall began in February 1979 when he was arrested on trafficking charges. He was scheduled to appear before United States District Judge John Wood, who was nicknamed "Maximum John" because he had a reputation for giving out the maximum sentence allowed for drug-related crimes. Facing a possible life sentence without parole, Chagra attempted to bribe Wood for "$5 million or 10 million". When that failed, Chagra decided to have the judge killed.

Chagra was accused (but acquitted) of hiring hitman Charles Harrelson (actor Woody Harrelson's father) to kill Wood for $250,000. Although he later confessed to conspiracy in a deal to help his wife. On May 29, 1979, Wood was murdered outside his home by a shot in the back. He was the first federal judge to die by assassination in over a century. The authorities did not immediately suspect Chagra of involvement in the assassination, and it took thousands of man-hours to identify him as a suspect. In August 1979, his narcotics trafficking case went to trial and Chagra was found guilty and sentenced to 30 years. Chagra jumped bail, but was captured six months later in Las Vegas.

Harrelson was eventually caught and convicted of being the gunman after Chagra discussed the assassination with his brother Joe during a penitentiary visit at Leavenworth, Kansas. This was among over a thousand recorded conversations that the FBI had collected as evidence. Even though Joe Chagra was a lawyer, he was also suspected in conspiracy to conceal the crime; therefore, their conversations were not covered by attorney-client privilege.

Both Harrelson and Chagra's brother Joe were implicated in the assassination. Joe Chagra testified against the other defendants in exchange for pleading guilty to murder-conspiracy with a maximum sentence of ten years in a plea-bargain deal, and with an agreement that he would not testify against his brother Jimmy in a separate trial. Joe Chagra's defense reportedly attempted to plead guilty to a lesser offense of conspiring to obstruct justice instead. Charles Harrelson got two consecutive life terms plus 5 years, Harrelson's wife Jo Ann got 25 years and Jimmy Chagra's wife Elizabeth was also sent to prison for 30 years for delivering the payout money. Jimmy Chagra was acquitted of the murder of Wood in front of Judge William S. Sessions, future director of the FBI, although he was found guilty of obstructing justice and conspiring to smuggle drugs. Chagra's lawyer in the case was Oscar Goodman, future Mayor of Las Vegas.

In a deal with the federal government, Jimmy Chagra admitted to his role in the murder of Wood and the attempted murder of Assistant United States Attorney James Kerr. He reportedly did this in order to have his wife, Elizabeth, released early. His wife was never released and she died in custody of ovarian cancer at age 41. Joe Chagra served six and a half years in prison (of his ten-year sentence) and was released. He died from injuries resulting from an automobile accident that occurred on December 6, 1996.

At the time, the case of Wood's murder was described as "the most extensive [investigation by the FBI] since President John F. Kennedy's murder in 1963." It was otherwise described as "one of the most intense investigations in the annals of the FBI". Jurors heard hours worth of tape recordings and more than 500 pages of documents were presented. The FBI conducted more than 30,000 interviews related to the case and in total collected more than 500,000 pieces of information. The investigation cost more than $11 million.

== Later life and death ==
Chagra was released from prison for health reasons in Atlanta, Georgia, on December 9, 2003. He was widely believed to have been placed in the Federal Witness Protection Program. However, his sister Patsy stated that he was not in the witness protection program at the time of his death. The story surrounding the assassination of Wood was profiled in an episode of City Confidential. A fictitious name reference to the Judge John Wood assassination also appeared in an The FBI Files episode "Dangerous Company" as the show regularly changed names of real-life people to protect privacy. He was also used in FBI: The Untold Stories.

Chagra married his fourth wife, Lynda Ray, while living under the name James Madrid on November 22, 2005. They were married in Las Vegas. He had seven children, including a daughter named Catherine, who wrote a memoir about the family.

Jimmy Chagra died of cancer on July 25, 2008, living in Mesa, Arizona.
