= William Diehl =

American writer (1924–2006)

- Born: December 4, 1924; Woodstock, Georgia, U.S.
- Died: November 24, 2006 (aged 81); Atlanta, Georgia, U.S.
- Occupations: Author, photojournalist
- Writing career
- Period: 1977–2006

William Diehl (/diːl/; December 4, 1924 – November 24, 2006) was an American novelist and photojournalist.

== Biography ==
During World War II, Diehl lied about his age to join the U.S. Army Air Corps at 17, serving as a ball turret gunner on a B-24 Liberator where he flew 24 missions over Germany. He was the recipient of the Distinguished Flying Cross, the Purple Heart and the Air Medal with three oak leaf clusters. Diehl often cited his experiences during the war as a strong influence on his fiction.

Diehl was also a successful photographer and journalist, when he began his novel-writing career at 50. His first novel, Sharky's Machine, was made into the 1981 film of the same name, directed by and starring Burt Reynolds. Diehl saw it being shot on location in and around his hometown of Atlanta, Georgia. It was the most successful box-office release of a film directed by Reynolds.

Diehl relocated to St. Simons Island, Georgia, in the early 1980s, and lived there for the next 15 years before returning to Atlanta. While living on St. Simons, he completed eight other novels, including Primal Fear, which was adapted into the 1996 film of the same name.

== Death ==
Diehl died of an aortic aneurysm at Emory University Hospital in Atlanta on November 24, 2006.

== Bibliography ==
- Sharky's Machine (1978)
- Chameleon (1981)
- Hooligans (1984)
- Thai Horse (1987)
- The Hunt (27) (1990)
- Primal Fear (1993)†
- Show of Evil (1995)†
- Reign in Hell (1997)†
- Eureka (2002)
- Seven Ways to Die (2012) with Kenneth John Atchity

†Primal Fear, Show of Evil, and Reign in Hell are all part of a series featuring lawyer Martin Vail and killer Aaron Stampler.
