= Charles Harrelson =

American hitman (1938–2007)

- Charles Harrelson mug shot, May 1960
- Born: Charles Voyde Harrelson; July 23, 1938; Lovelady, Texas, U.S.
- Died: March 15, 2007 (aged 68); USP Florence ADMAX, Fremont County, Colorado, U.S.
- Occupation: Hitman
- Spouses: Nancy Hillman; Diane Lou Oswald (m. 1959; div. 1964): Jo Ann; Gina Adelle Foster
- Children: with Diane Lou: 3, including; Woody Harrelson; Brett Harrelson
- Parent(s): Voyde and Alma Harrelson
- Status: Deceased
- Criminal charges: Armed robbery: (convicted 1960); Murder: (acquitted September 22, 1970); Murder: (convicted August 12, 1973); Murder: (convicted December 14, 1982)
- Penalty: 1960: 5 years (served months); 1973: 15 years (served 5); 1979: 2 life sentences
- Accomplices: Murder of Sam Degelia: Pete Scamardo; Assassination of John H. Wood Jr: Jamiel Chagra

Details
- Killed: 2+
- Weapon: .240 Weatherby Mark V rifle

Charles Voyde Harrelson (July 23, 1938 – March 15, 2007) was an American contract killer and organized crime figure who was convicted of assassinating federal judge John H. Wood Jr., the first federal judge assassinated in the 20th century. Charles Harrelson was the father of actors Woody and Brett Harrelson.

== Early life ==
Charles Voyde Harrelson was born on July 23, 1938, in Lovelady, Texas, and was the son of Alma Lee (née Sparks; 1907–2002) and Voyde Harrelson (1901–1976). He was married four times, to Nancy Hillman Harrelson, Diane Lou Oswald, Jo Ann Harrelson, and Gina Adelle Foster. Harrelson worked as an encyclopedia salesman in California and a professional gambler.

== Crimes prior to the Wood assassination ==
In 1960, he was convicted of armed robbery. Harrelson later claimed that he was involved in dozens of murders beginning in the early 1960s.

Defended by Percy Foreman, Harrelson was tried for the 1968 murder of Alan Harry Berg. On September 22, 1970, he was acquitted by a jury in Angleton, Texas. The murder is chronicled in the memoir Run Brother Run by the victim's brother, David Berg.

Harrelson was tried for the 1968 murder-for-hire killing of Sam Degelia Jr., a resident of Hearne, Texas. Harrelson was paid $2,000 (equivalent to $18,500 in 2025) for the murder of Degelia, a grain dealer and father of four killed in McAllen, Texas. His first trial ended with a deadlocked jury, although Pete Scamardo, who was also tried in the case, was found guilty of being an accomplice to the murder, and sentenced to seven years probation. Harrelson was retried in 1973, convicted, and sentenced to 15 years in prison. In 1978, after serving five years, he was released early for good behavior.

== Assassination of John H. Wood Jr. ==
Shortly after Harrelson was paroled in 1978, he and his then-wife Jo Ann were implicated in another murder. On May 29, 1979, U.S. district judge John H. Wood Jr. was shot dead in the parking lot outside his San Antonio, Texas, townhouse. Harrelson was convicted of killing Judge Wood after being hired by drug dealer Jamiel Chagra of El Paso, Texas. Wood—nicknamed "Maximum John" because of his reputation for handing down long sentences for drug offenses—was originally scheduled to have Chagra appear before him on the day of his murder, but the trial had been delayed.

Harrelson was apprehended when calls were made to the police saying he was firing a gun at imaginary FBI agents while on drugs. With the aid of an anonymous tip and a tape recording of a jailhouse conversation between Jamiel Chagra and his brother, attorney Joe Chagra, Harrelson was charged with Judge Wood's murder. Harrelson claimed at trial that he did not kill Judge Wood, but merely took credit for it so he could claim a large payment from Jamiel Chagra.

Harrelson was sentenced to two life terms based largely on Jamiel Chagra's conversation with his brother from prison. Both Harrelson and Joe Chagra were implicated in the assassination, and the latter received a ten-year sentence as part of a plea bargain to testify for the prosecution but not against his brother. Without Joe's testimony, Jamiel Chagra was acquitted of the murder. Jamiel was represented by the future mayor of Las Vegas, Oscar Goodman, then a public defender. In a plea bargain, Jamiel admitted to his role in the murder of Judge Wood and the attempted murder of a U.S. attorney. Harrelson's wife Jo Ann was sentenced to consecutive terms totaling 25 years on multiple convictions of conspiracy and perjury related to the assassination.

In 2003, Jamiel Chagra recanted his previous statements, claiming that someone other than Harrelson shot Judge Wood. Harrelson's son, Woody, then attempted to have his father's conviction overturned to secure a new trial, although without success. Jamiel Chagra died in July 2008 of cancer.

== Allegations and self-made claims of involvement in the assassination of John F. Kennedy ==
In September 1980, Harrelson surrendered to police after a six-hour standoff in which he was reportedly high on cocaine. During the standoff, he threatened suicide and stated that he had killed both Judge Wood and President John F. Kennedy. In a television interview after his arrest, Harrelson said: "At the same time I said I had killed the judge, I said I had killed Kennedy, which might give you an idea to the state of my mind at the time." He said that the statements made during the standoff were "an effort to elongate my life."

Joseph Chagra, an attorney from El Paso, later testified during Harrelson's trial that Harrelson claimed to have shot Kennedy and drew maps depicting his hiding spot during the assassination. Chagra said he did not believe Harrelson's claim, and the AP reported that the FBI "apparently discounted any involvement by Harrelson in the Kennedy assassination." According to Jim Marrs' 1989 book Crossfire, some theorists believe Harrelson is the youngest and tallest of the "three tramps" arrested shortly after Kennedy's shooting in Dallas. Marrs stated that Harrelson was involved "with criminals connected to intelligence agencies and the military" and suggested he was connected to Jack Ruby through Russell Douglas Matthews, a third party with links to organized crime who was known to both Harrelson and Ruby. Lois Gibson, a well-known forensic artist, matched photographs of Harrelson to photographs of the youngest-looking of the three "tramps".

In 1982, Harrelson told Dallas TV station KDFW-TV, "Do you believe that Lee Harvey Oswald killed President Kennedy, alone, without any aid from a rogue agency of the U.S. government or at least a portion of that agency? I believe you are very naive if you do."

== Escape attempt ==
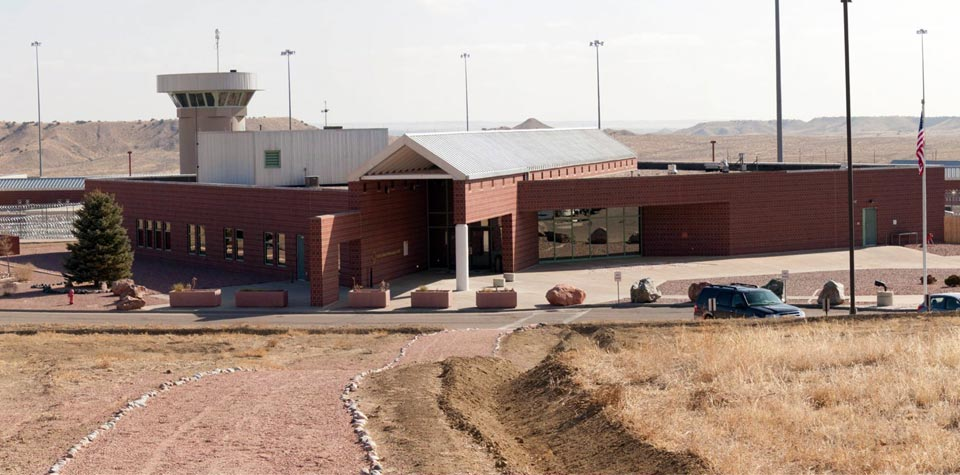
ADX Florence, where Harrelson was transferred after his escape attempt

On July 4, 1995, Harrelson and fellow inmates Gary Settle and Michael Rivers attempted to escape from the Atlanta Federal Penitentiary using a makeshift rope. A warning shot was fired at them from the prison's tower, and the trio surrendered. Harrelson was subsequently transferred to supermax prison ADX Florence in Colorado. In a letter to a friend, Harrelson wrote that he enjoyed his life inside the maximum security facility, writing that "there are not enough hours in a day for my needs as a matter of fact ... The silence is wonderful."

== Personal life and death ==
Harrelson's son, Woodrow Tracy Harrelson (born July 23, 1961), is actor Woody Harrelson. According to Woody, his father disappeared from the family's Houston home in 1968, leaving his wife Diane to raise Woody and his two brothers. Woody lost track of his father until 1981, when news broke of Harrelson's arrest for the murder of Judge Wood. In a November 1988 interview, Woody revealed that he visited his father regularly in federal prison, although he still harbored mixed feelings about him, saying:

My father is one of the most articulate, well-read, charming people I've ever known. Still, I'm just now gauging whether he merits my loyalty or friendship. I look at him as someone who could be a friend more than someone who was a father.

In April 2023, actor Matthew McConaughey claimed that he and Woody Harrelson, who have been long-time friends, could potentially be half-brothers, implying that Charles Harrelson could also be his father. According to McConaughey, his mother claimed to have known Woody's father around the time that McConaughey was conceived, and the two actors discussed taking a DNA test to be certain.

On March 15, 2007, at the age of 68, Harrelson was found dead in his cell from a heart attack.

== Media ==
In Cormac McCarthy's 2005 novel No Country for Old Men, set in 1980, the sheriff states, "Here a while back in San Antonio they shot and killed a federal judge," referencing the murder of Judge John H. Wood Jr. by Harrelson. His son Woody Harrelson acted in the 2007 film adaptation of the novel, which premiered two months after the elder Harrelson's death.

A 10-episode podcast titled Son of a Hitman was released on May 5, 2020, by Spotify Studios and produced by High Five Content. It is produced and hosted by journalist Jason Cavanagh and investigates the legitimacy of the three murder charges for which Charles Harrelson was tried as well as the possibility that he may have been involved with the assassination of President John F. Kennedy.
