= 1997 MTV Movie Awards =

American film awards ceremony

- Date: Saturday, June 7, 1997
- Location: Barker Hangar, Santa Monica, California
- Country: United States
- Hosted by: Mike Myers

Television/radio coverage
- Network: MTV

The 1997 MTV Movie Awards were held on Saturday, June 7, 1997, airing on MTV from the Barker Hangar in Santa Monica, California and hosted by Mike Myers.

== Performers ==
- Bush — "Cold Contagious"
- Jewel — "Foolish Games"
- En Vogue — "Whatever"
- The Wondermints (Austin Powers Band) — "BBC"

== Presenters ==
- Elle Macpherson and Chris O'Donnell — presented Breakthrough Performance
- Dylan McDermott and Gillian Anderson — presented Best Action Sequence
- Mike Myers — introduced Bush
- Cameron Diaz and Ewan McGregor — presented Best Kiss
- Michael Keaton and Salma Hayek — presented Best Villain
- Bill Bellamy and Ashley Judd — presented Best On-Screen Duo
- Renée Zellweger — introduced Jewel
- Toni Braxton — presented Best Song from a Movie
- Mike Myers — presented the Lifetime Achievement Award
- Ellen Barkin — presented Best New Filmmaker
- Alicia Silverstone — presented Best Comedic Performance
- David Spade and Hanson — presented Best Fight
- Puff Daddy — introduced En Vogue
- Gwen Stefani and Neve Campbell — presented Best Male Performance
- Will Smith — presented Best Female Performance
- Samuel L. Jackson and Mira Sorvino — presented Best Movie

== Awards ==
Winners are listed at the top of each list in bold.

=== Best Movie ===
Scream

- Independence Day
- Jerry Maguire
- The Rock
- Romeo + Juliet

=== Best Male Performance ===
Tom Cruise – Jerry Maguire

- Leonardo DiCaprio – Romeo + Juliet
- Eddie Murphy – The Nutty Professor
- Will Smith – Independence Day
- John Travolta – Phenomenon

=== Best Female Performance ===
Claire Danes – Romeo + Juliet

- Sandra Bullock – A Time to Kill
- Neve Campbell – Scream
- Helen Hunt – Twister
- Madonna – Evita

=== Breakthrough Performance ===
Matthew McConaughey – A Time To Kill

- Vivica A. Fox – Independence Day
- Courtney Love – The People vs. Larry Flynt
- Ewan McGregor – Trainspotting
- Renée Zellweger – Jerry Maguire

=== Best On-Screen Duo ===
Nicolas Cage and Sean Connery – The Rock

- Beavis and Butt-head – Beavis and Butt-head Do America
- Steve Buscemi and Peter Stormare – Fargo
- Claire Danes and Leonardo DiCaprio – Romeo + Juliet
- Nathan Lane and Robin Williams – The Birdcage

=== Best Villain ===
Jim Carrey – The Cable Guy

- Robert De Niro – The Fan
- Kiefer Sutherland – A Time To Kill
- Edward Norton – Primal Fear
- Mark Wahlberg – Fear

=== Best Comedic Performance ===
Jim Carrey – The Cable Guy

- Chris Farley – Beverly Hills Ninja
- Janeane Garofalo – The Truth About Cats & Dogs
- Eddie Murphy – The Nutty Professor
- Robin Williams – The Birdcage

=== Best Song from a Movie ===
Bush — "Machinehead" (from Fear)

- Eric Clapton and Babyface — "Change the World" (from Phenomenon)
- Garbage — "#1 Crush" (from Romeo + Juliet)
- Madonna — "Don't Cry for Me Argentina" (from Evita)
- R. Kelly — "I Believe I Can Fly" (from Space Jam)

=== Best Kiss ===
Vivica A. Fox and Will Smith – Independence Day

- Claire Danes and Leonardo DiCaprio – Romeo + Juliet
- Gina Gershon and Jennifer Tilly – Bound
- Kyra Sedgwick and John Travolta – Phenomenon
- Christine Taylor and Christopher Daniel Barnes – A Very Brady Sequel

=== Best Action Sequence ===
Truck Drives Through Farm Equipment – Twister

- Arnold Schwarzenegger Freefalls – Eraser
- Aliens Blow Up Cities – Independence Day
- Train/Helicopter Chase – Mission: Impossible
- Ferrari Chase Through San Francisco – The Rock

=== Best Fight ===
Fairuza Balk vs. Robin Tunney – The Craft

- Matthew Broderick vs. Jim Carrey – The Cable Guy
- Jim Brown vs. Alien – Mars Attacks!
- Jackie Chan vs. Ladder – Police Story 4: First Strike
- Pamela Anderson Lee vs. Bad Guy – Barb Wire

=== Best New Filmmaker ===
- **Doug Liman – Swingers**

=== Lifetime Achievement Award ===
- **Chewbacca – Star Wars Episode IV: A New Hope, The Empire Strikes Back, and Return of the Jedi**
