= Brett Harrelson =

American actor (born 1963)

- Born: Brett Voyde Harrelson; June 4, 1963 (age 63); Midland, Texas, U.S.
- Occupation: Actor
- Years active: 1990–present
- Children: 2
- Father: Charles Harrelson
- Relatives: Woody Harrelson (brother)

Brett Voyde Harrelson (born June 4, 1963) is an American actor. He is the younger brother of actor Woody Harrelson and son of hitman Charles Harrelson.

== Early life ==
Harrelson was born Brett Voyde Harrelson in Midland, Texas on June 4, 1963, the son of Diane Lou (née Oswald) and Charles Voyde Harrelson, who divorced in 1964. He has two brothers, Jordan and Woody Harrelson. Harrelson's father, who was a contract killer, was arrested for the killing of Judge John H. Wood Jr. by rifle fire in 1979 in San Antonio. His father was convicted and eventually died during his life sentence in United States Penitentiary Administrative Maximum Facility.

In 1973, Harrelson moved with his mother to her native city, Lebanon, Ohio, where he was raised. Harrelson attended Lebanon High School but dropped out at 17 to join the United States Army, and spent two years in Germany. Afterward, he returned to Lebanon and worked as a legal clerk.

== Career ==
At 22, Harrelson followed his brother Woody to California. "I came to L.A. to starify," he says. But finding nothing like Woody's success, he gave up acting for a while to become a motorcycle racer, rising to #8 in the 1992 professional national rankings. "After seeing a few people killed," says Brett, he became Woody's assistant and began to pursue his acting career again.

His current activities include TV ads for "Harrelson's Own CBD". In 2020, Harrelson co-produced Son of a Hitman, a podcast series. The show was released by Spotify Studios and High Five Content.

== Personal life ==
Harrelson has two sons from previous relationships, one who lives in Washington State and one with Suzanne Le, later the wife of Sebastian Bach.

== Filmography ==
=== Film ===
| Year | Title | Role | Notes |
|---|---|---|---|
| 1996 | Sunchaser | Younger Highway Patrol Officer | |
| 1996 | The People vs. Larry Flynt | Jimmy Flynt | |
| 1998 | Strangeland | Steve Christian | |
| 1998 | Dante's View | Jeremy | |
| 1999 | From Dusk Till Dawn 2: Texas Blood Money | Ray Bob | |
| 1999 | Inferno | Buck | |
| 2003 | Go Further | Self | Documentary |
| 2005 | Earthlings | Executive Producer | Documentary |

=== Television ===
| Year | Title | Role | Notes |
|---|---|---|---|
| 1990 | A Mom for Christmas | Kendall | Television film |
