= Reign in Hell (novel) =

1997 novel by William Diehl

- Author: William Diehl
- Language: English
- Genre: Thriller
- Publisher: Villard
- Publication date: 1997
- Publication place: United States
- Media type: Print (hardback & paperback)
- Preceded by: Show of Evil

Reign in Hell is a 1997 thriller novel by American thriller William Diehl, the sequel to Primal Fear and Show of Evil.

== Plot ==
Martin Vail, now a United States Attorney, is assigned a case in which he must go up against a survivalist militia — and unexpectedly encounters his nemesis, Aaron Stampler, seemingly back from the dead and posing as a blind Baptist preacher.
