= Larry Flynt =

American publisher (1942–2021)

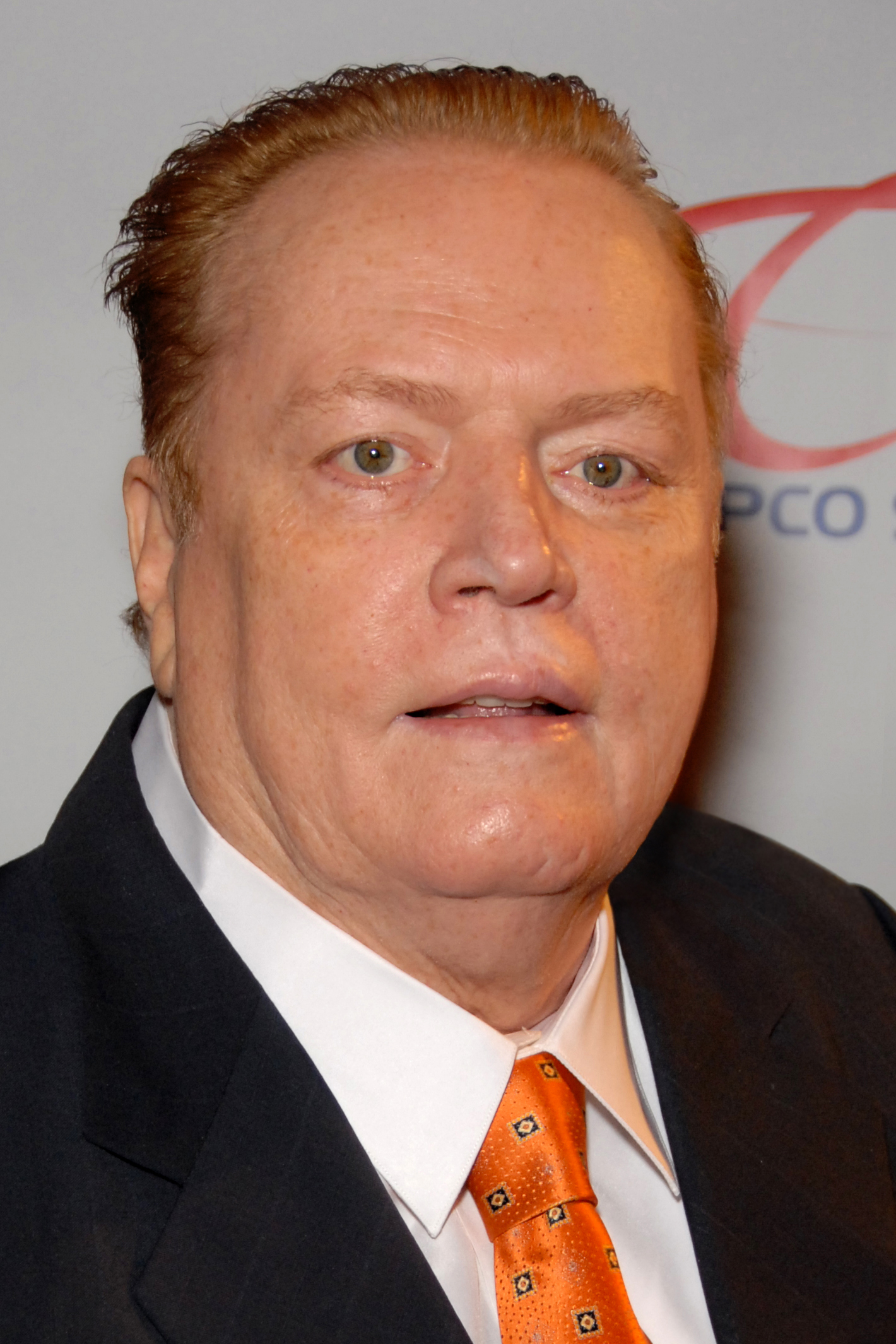
- Flynt in 2009
- Born: Larry Claxton Flynt Jr. November 1, 1942; Lakeville, Kentucky, U.S.
- Died: February 10, 2021 (aged 78); Los Angeles, California, U.S.
- Resting place: Forest Lawn Memorial Park
- Occupations: Publisher; activist; businessman
- Years active: 1965–2021
- Political party: Democratic
- Spouses: Mary Flynt (m. 1961; div. 1965) Peggy Mathis (m. 1966; div. 1969) Kathy Barr (m. 1970; div. 1975) Althea Leasure (m. 1976; died 1987) Elizabeth Berrios (m. 1998)
- Children: 5

Larry Claxton Flynt Jr. (/flɪnt/; November 1, 1942 – February 10, 2021) was an American publisher and the president of Larry Flynt Publications (LFP). LFP mainly produces pornographic magazines, such as Hustler, pornographic videos, and three pornographic television channels named Hustler TV. Flynt fought several high-profile legal battles involving the First Amendment, and unsuccessfully ran for public office. He was paralyzed from the waist down due to injuries sustained in a 1978 attempted assassination by serial killer Joseph Paul Franklin. In 2003, Arena magazine listed him at No. 1 on the "50 Powerful People in Porn" list. The 1996 biographical drama film The People vs. Larry Flynt, directed by Miloš Forman and starring Woody Harrelson, chronicles the life and career of Flynt.

== Early life ==
Flynt was born in Lakeville, Magoffin County, Kentucky, the first of three children of Larry Claxton Flynt Sr., a sharecropper, and Edith (née Arnett), a homemaker. He had two younger siblings: sister Judy and brother Jimmy Ray Flynt. His father served in the United States Army in the European theatre of World War II. Due to his father's absence, Flynt was raised solely by his mother and maternal grandmother for the first three years of his life. Flynt was raised in poverty, and said Magoffin County was the poorest county in the nation during the Great Depression. In 1951, Flynt's sister, Judy, died of leukemia at age four. The death provoked his parents' divorce one year later; Flynt was then raised by his mother in Hamlet, Indiana, and his brother, Jimmy, was raised by his maternal grandmother in Magoffin County. Two years later, Flynt returned to live in Magoffin County with his father because he disliked his mother's new boyfriend.

Flynt attended Salyersville High School (now Magoffin County High School) in the ninth grade. However, he ran away from home and, despite being only 15 years old, joined the United States Army using a counterfeit birth certificate. It was around that time that he developed a passion for the game of poker. After being honorably discharged, Flynt returned to his mother in Indiana and found employment at the Inland Manufacturing Company, an affiliate of General Motors. However, there was a union-led slowdown and he was laid off after only three months. He then returned to his father in Kentucky. For a brief period, he became a bootlegger but stopped when he learned that county deputies were searching for him. After living on his savings for two months, he enlisted in the United States Navy in July 1960. He became a radar operator on USS Enterprise. He was the operator on duty when the ship was assigned to recover John Glenn's space capsule. He was honorably discharged in July 1964.

== First enterprises ==
In early 1965, Flynt took $1,800 (approx. $17,000 in 2022 when adjusted for inflation) from his savings and bought his mother's bar in Dayton, Ohio, called the Keewee. He refitted it and was soon making $1,000 a week (approx. $9,300 in 2022); he used the profits to buy two other bars. He worked as many as 20 hours a day and took amphetamines to stay awake.

Flynt decided to open a new, higher-class bar, which would also be the first in the area to feature nude hostess dancers; he named it the Hustler Club. From 1968 onward, with the help of his brother Jimmy and later his girlfriend Althea Leasure, he opened Hustler Clubs in Akron, Cleveland, Columbus, Cincinnati, and Toledo, Ohio. Soon each club grossed between $260,000 and $520,000 a year. He also acquired the Dayton franchise of a small newspaper called Bachelor's Beat, which he published for two years before selling it. At the same time, he closed a money-losing vending-machine business.

== Hustler magazine ==
In January 1972, Flynt created the Hustler Newsletter, a two-page, black-and-white publication about his clubs. This item became so popular with his customers that by May 1972, he expanded the Hustler Newsletter to 16 pages, then to 32 pages in August 1973. As a result of the 1973 oil crisis, the American economy entered recession and the revenues of Hustler Clubs declined. Flynt had to refinance his debts or declare bankruptcy. He decided to turn the Hustler Newsletter into a sexually explicit magazine with national distribution. He paid the start-up costs of the new magazine by deferring payment of sales taxes his clubs owed on their activities.

In July 1974, the first issue of Hustler was published. Although the first few issues went largely unnoticed, within a year the magazine became highly lucrative, and Flynt was able to pay his tax debts. Flynt's friend Al Goldstein said that Hustler took its inspiration from his own tabloid Screw, but credited his comrade-in-arms with accomplishing what he had not: creating a national publication. In November 1974, Hustler showed the first "pink-shots", or photos of open vulvas. Flynt had to fight to publish each issue. Many people, including some at his distribution company, found the magazine too explicit and threatened to remove it from the market. Shortly thereafter, Flynt was approached by a paparazzo who had taken pictures of former First Lady Jacqueline Kennedy Onassis while she was sunbathing nude on vacation in 1971. He purchased them for $18,000 (approx. $98,000 in 2022) and published them in the August 1975 issue. That issue attracted widespread attention, and one million copies were sold within a few days. (Goldstein's Screw magazine had previously published nude photos of Onassis in early 1973.) Now a millionaire, Flynt bought a $375,000 (approx. $2 million in 2022) mansion.

== Attempted assassination ==
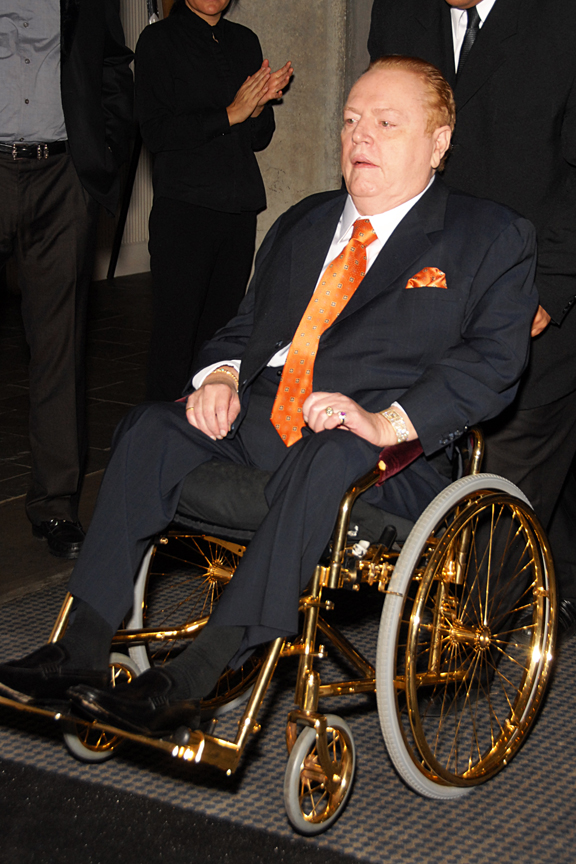
Larry Flynt in his gold-plated wheelchair in 2009

On March 6, 1978, during a legal battle related to obscenity in Gwinnett County, Georgia, Flynt and his local attorney, Gene Reeves Jr. were shot on the sidewalk in Lawrenceville by Joseph Paul Franklin. The shooting left Flynt partially paralyzed with permanent spinal cord damage, and in need of a wheelchair. Reeves Jr. was shot in the arm and side; but fully recovered.

=== Joseph Paul Franklin ===
Franklin, a militant white supremacist and serial killer, also shot Vernon Jordan; he targeted other black and Jewish people in a killing spree from 1977 to 1980. Violently opposed to 'miscegenation,' he confessed to the shootings many years later, claiming he was outraged by an interracial photo shoot in Hustler. About Flynt and a Hustler pictorial, he stated, "I saw that interracial couple ... having sex ... It just made me sick ... I threw the magazine down and thought, I'm gonna kill that guy." Flynt himself suspected the attack was part of a larger conspiracy involving ultra-right elements surrounding U.S. Representative Larry McDonald also behind the Karen Silkwood case with ties to the Intelligence Community and that Franklin may have been subject to MKULTRA-style mind control.

Franklin was never brought to trial for the attack on Flynt. Franklin was eventually charged in Missouri with eight unrelated counts of murder and sentenced to death. Flynt expressed his opposition to the death penalty and stated he did not want Franklin to be executed. Despite that, Franklin was executed by lethal injection on November 20, 2013.

== Personal life and death ==
Flynt was married five times; his wives were:

- Mary Flynt (1961–1965)
- Peggy Mathis (1966–1969)
- Kathy Barr (1970–1975)
- Althea Leasure (1976–1987)
- Elizabeth Berrios (1998–2021)

He married his fourth wife, Althea, in 1976, and they remained married for eleven years until her death at age 33. Larry reported she had ARC (AIDS-related complex), but drowned in a bathtub in 1987. Toxicology reports were inconclusive. He married his fifth wife, Elizabeth Berrios, in 1998. Flynt had four daughters and a son, as well as many grandchildren. His daughter Lisa Flynt-Fugate died in a car crash in Ohio in October 2014 at age 47.

He said he was an evangelical Christian for one year, "converted" in 1977 by evangelist Ruth Carter Stapleton, the sister of Jimmy Carter. He said he became "born again" and that he had a vision from God while flying with Stapleton in his jet. He continued to publish his magazine, however, vowing to "hustle for God". He later declared himself an atheist. (Note: I have left my religious conversion behind and settled into a comfortable state of atheism. — L. Flynt (1996))

Flynt said he had bipolar disorder.

Flynt died from heart failure in Los Angeles on February 10, 2021, at age 78.

== Flynt's enterprises ==
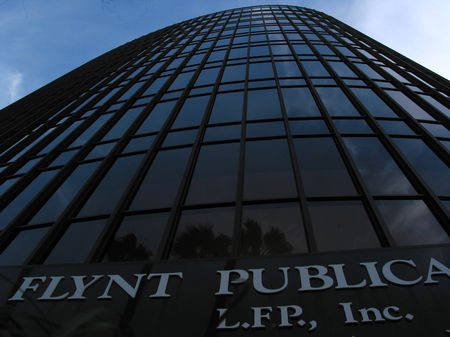
LFP, Inc. headquarters in Beverly Hills

By 1970, he ran eight strip clubs throughout Ohio in Cincinnati, Toledo, Akron, and Cleveland.

In July 1974, Flynt first published Hustler as a step forward from the Hustler Newsletter, which was advertising for his businesses. The magazine struggled for the first year, partly because many distributors and wholesalers refused to handle it as its nude photos became increasingly graphic. It targeted working-class men and grew from a shaky start to a peak circulation of around three million. The publication of nude paparazzi pictures of Jacqueline Kennedy Onassis in August 1975 was a major coup. Hustler has often featured more explicit photographs than comparable magazines and has contained depictions of women that some find demeaning, such as a naked woman in a meat grinder or presented as a dog on a leash – though Flynt later said that the meat grinder image was a criticism of the pornography industry itself.

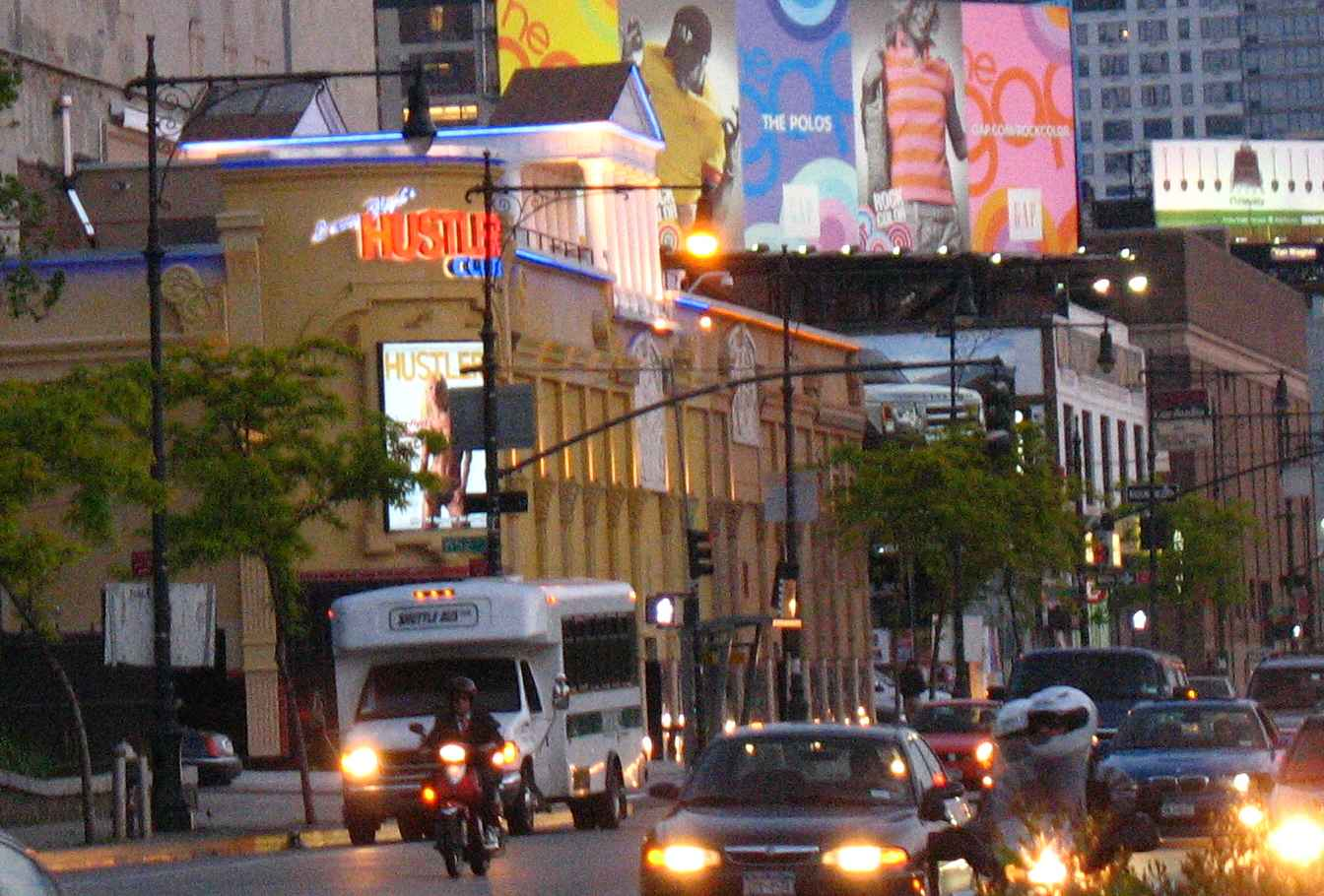
Larry Flynt's Hustler Club on West 52nd Street in New York

Flynt created his privately held company Larry Flynt Publications (LFP) in 1976. LFP published several other magazines and also controlled distribution of the various titles. LFP launched Ohio Magazine in 1977, and later its output included other mainstream work. LFP sold the distribution business, as well as several mainstream magazines, beginning in 1996. LFP started to produce pornographic movies in 1998, through the Hustler Video film studio, which purchased VCA Pictures in 2003. In 2014, Flynt said his print portfolio made up only 10% of his company's revenue, and predicted the demise of Hustler due to competition from the Internet.

On June 22, 2000, Flynt opened the Hustler Casino, a card room located in the Los Angeles suburb of Gardena. Other ventures which were wholly owned or licensed by Flynt or are wholly owned or licensed by LFP, Inc. include the Hustler Clubs and the Hustler Hollywood Store. LFP also publishes Barely Legal, a pornographic magazine featuring young women who reportedly have recently turned 18, the minimum age for a person to appear in pornography in the US.

== Legal battles ==
Flynt was embroiled in many legal battles regarding the regulation of pornography and free speech within the United States, especially attacking the Miller v. California (1973) obscenity exception to the First Amendment. He was first prosecuted on obscenity and organized crime charges in Cincinnati in 1976 by Simon Leis, who headed a local anti-pornography committee. He was given a sentence of 7–25 years in prison, but served only six days in jail; the sentence was overturned on appeal following allegations of prosecutorial misconduct, as well as judicial and jury bias. One argument resulting from this case was reviewed by the U.S. Supreme Court in 1981. Flynt made an appearance in a feature film based on the trial, The People vs. Larry Flynt (1996), playing the judge who sentenced him in the case.

Outraged by a derogatory cartoon published in Hustler in 1976, Kathy Keeton, then girlfriend of Penthouse publisher Bob Guccione, filed a libel suit against Flynt in Ohio. Her lawsuit was dismissed because she had missed the deadline under the statute of limitations. She then filed a new lawsuit in New Hampshire, where Hustler's sales were very small. The question of whether she could sue there reached the U.S. Supreme Court in 1983, with Flynt losing the case. This case is occasionally reviewed today in first-year law school Civil Procedure courses, due to its implications regarding personal jurisdiction over a defendant.

During the proceedings in Keeton v. Hustler Magazine, Flynt shouted "Fuck this court!" and called the justices "nine assholes and one token cunt" (referring to Justice Sandra Day O'Connor). Chief Justice Warren E. Burger had him arrested for contempt of court, but the charge was later dismissed.

Also in 1983, he leaked an FBI surveillance tape to the media regarding John DeLorean. In the videos, when arresting DeLorean, the FBI is shown asking him whether he would rather defend himself or have "his daughter's head smashed in". During the subsequent trial, Flynt wore a U.S. flag as a diaper and was jailed for six months for desecration of the flag.

In 1988, Flynt won a Supreme Court decision, Hustler Magazine v. Falwell, after being sued by Reverend Jerry Falwell in 1983, over an offensive ad parody in Hustler that suggested that Falwell's first sexual encounter was with his mother in an outhouse. Falwell sued Flynt, citing "emotional distress" caused by the ad. The decision clarified that public figures cannot recover damages for "intentional infliction of emotional distress" based on parodies. After Falwell's death, Flynt said despite their differences, he and Falwell had become friends over the years, adding, "I always appreciated his sincerity even though I knew what he was selling and he knew what I was selling."

As a result of a sting operation in April 1998, Flynt was charged with a number of obscenity-related offenses concerning the sale of sex videos to a youth in a Cincinnati adult store he owned. In a plea agreement in 1999, LFP, Inc. (Flynt's corporate holdings group) pleaded guilty to two counts of pandering obscenity and agreed to stop selling adult videos in Cincinnati.

In June 2003, prosecutors in Hamilton County, Ohio, attempted to revive criminal charges of pandering obscene material against Flynt and his brother Jimmy Flynt, charging that they had violated the 1999 agreement. Flynt said that he no longer had an interest in the Hustler Shops and that prosecutors had no basis for the lawsuit.

In January 2009, Flynt filed suit against two nephews, Jimmy Flynt II and Dustin Flynt, for the use of his family name in producing pornography. He regarded their pornography to be inferior. He prevailed on the main trademark infringement issue, but lost on invasion of privacy claims.

In May 2021, Vice News published Flynt's 322-page FBI file, which the outlet obtained through a Freedom of Information Act (FOIA) request. It contained details of his 1983 arrest for disrupting the U.S. Supreme Court during the Keeton hearing and the unconfirmed claim of a confidential informant that Flynt had asked mercenary Mitchell WerBell III to rig his wheelchair with C-4 explosives so he could blow himself up during that same hearing, taking all of the justices with him.

== Politics ==
Flynt was a Democrat when Bill Clinton was president. In 2013, he said he was "a civil libertarian to the core", though he once attempted a presidential run as a Republican in 1984. He was a staunch critic of the Warren Commission and offered $1 million for information leading to the arrest and conviction of the assassin of John F. Kennedy. In 2003, Flynt was a candidate in the recall election of California governor Gray Davis, calling himself a "smut peddler who cares". He finished seventh in a field of 135 candidates with 17,458 votes (0.2%).

Flynt repeatedly weighed in on public debates by trying to expose conservative or Republican politicians with sexual scandals. He did so during the impeachment proceedings against President Clinton in 1998, offering $1 million for evidence and publishing the results in The Flynt Report. These publications led to the resignation of incoming House Speaker Bob Livingston. In 2007, Flynt repeated his $1 million offer and also wrote the foreword to Joseph Minton Amann and Tom Breuer's The Brotherhood of Disappearing Pants: A field guide to conservative sex scandals, which contained some cases published by Flynt.

In 2003, Flynt purchased nude photographs of former PFC Jessica Lynch, who was captured by Iraqi forces, rescued from an Iraqi hospital by U.S. troops and celebrated as a hero by the media. He said he would never show any of the photographs, calling Lynch a "good kid" who became "a pawn for the government". Flynt supported activist groups opposed to the war in Iraq in 2004 and 2005. He was a strong supporter of LGBT rights and same-sex marriage.

In 2012, Flynt offered a $1 million reward for information on Mitt Romney's unreleased tax returns and ran two full-page ads in USA Today and The Washington Post to promote the offer.

Flynt endorsed Mark Sanford in the 2013 special election for South Carolina's 1st congressional district, saying "His open embrace of his mistress in the name of love, breaking his sacred marriage vows, was an act of bravery that has drawn my support."

In January 2015, following the attack on Charlie Hebdo, Flynt criticized the American media for refusing to broadcast the caricatures of Mohammed from the satirical weekly.

In May 2015, Flynt endorsed Hillary Clinton in the 2016 presidential election. In an interview with Marfa Journal later that year, he described his political views as "progressively liberal".

In October 2017, Flynt offered a $10 million reward for any evidence that would lead to the impeachment of President Donald Trump. A 2019 Christmas card from Larry Flynt Publications, sent to several Republican congressmen, depicted Trump's assassination.

== Allegations of incest, misogyny, and racism ==
Flynt's daughter, Tonya Flynt-Vega, accused him of sexually abusing her as a child. In the 1998 book, Hustled: My Journey from Fear to Faith, Flynt-Vega writes about her father showing her images from Hustler and while he did so, he began touching her, had her remove her bathing suit, assaulted her orally, then showed her his erection and tried to penetrate her. She writes, "The pain was intense. I know I was hurt. Dad had not penetrated [me]." She described an exchange with her father after he knew she planned to publish a book describing his abuses of her: "He called me at work one day and said 'If you don't back-off that book, I'll send somebody to wring your [expletive] neck.' ... He's 'Mr. Free Speech', but he's threatening to kill somebody for writing a book." Flynt denied his daughter's accusation of sexual abuse on several occasions. "She's looking for attention, and she's looking to get back at me, as her father, for not being there when she really needed me," he said in one response. In another interview, he stated, "Anyone who knows me knows my sexual preference. It's not children, especially my own."

Hustler cartoonist and humor editor Dwaine B. Tinsley created the comic feature called "Chester the Molester". It was a monthly part of the magazine for 13 years. In the comic, the main character endeavors through various means to molest and otherwise sexually assault girls and women. In 1989, Tinsley was arrested, charged with molesting his daughter from age 13–18. Tinsley was convicted of that charge on January 5, 1990. His conviction was overturned in 1992 when an appeals court ruled that the jury should not have seen cartoons drawn by Tinsley. The prosecutor in the case ultimately decided not to retry Tinsley, who served 23 months of a six-year sentence. Flynt claims he did not ask Tinsley about the conviction and "Chester the Molester" cartoons drawn while in prison continued to appear in Hustler. He also defended Tinsley, calling him "a genius" and "at one time in America in the Seventies and Eighties the most brilliant and recognized cartoonist in America."

In addition to child molestation, the rape of adult women is a common theme in many of his magazines, including Hustler. A photo pictorial titled "The Naked and the Dead", depicted an imprisoned woman being forcibly shaved, sexually assaulted, raped, and electrocuted. In the January 1983 issue of Hustler, there was a photographic pictorial called "Dirty pool". It depicted a woman on a pool table being sexually assaulted and gang raped by four men. In early March 1983, 21 year-old Cheryl Araujo was gang raped on a pool table by four men in New Bedford. At the time, some coverage took on xenophobic overtones, blaming the crime not only on the victim but on the Portuguese community as a whole. Flynt created a fake postcard featuring a naked woman on a pool table with the caption, "Greetings from New Bedford, Massachusetts, the Portuguese gang-rape capital of America."

Criticizing the sanitizing scope of the 1996 film The People vs. Larry Flynt, feminist Gloria Steinem detailed his depictions of misogyny: "What's left out [of the film] are the magazine's images of women being beaten, tortured, and raped; women subject to degradations from bestiality to sexual slavery." Steinem also addressed what she saw as the hypocrisy of him being regarded as a protector of everyone's free speech, noting "other feminists and I have been attacked in Hustler for using our First Amendment rights to protest pornography." The film's director, Miloš Forman, a native of the former Czechoslovakia, rebutted these and similar feminist critiques, stating that if he had used such extreme pornographic content, he would not have been able to make the film, which was rated "R". Forman, whose parents were victims of the Nazis, said he made the movie "out of admiration for the beauty and wisdom of the American Constitution, which allows this country to rise to its best when provoked by the worst". Others also viewed the film as historical revisionism, portraying a heroic Flynt. Entertainment Weekly noted the "magazine's racist and anti-Semitic overtones – one Hustler cartoon showed a black man reaching for a watermelon on a giant mousetrap – is also nowhere to be found." His daughter Tonya also spoke out against the film.

In real life, Flynt did not shy away from rationalizing his publication of taboo content and humor, claiming that his goal was to "offend every single person in this world at some point", and pointing out that "If the First Amendment will protect a scumbag like me then it will protect all of you, because I'm the worst." He defended himself against allegations of misogyny, stating that he supported abortion rights, same-sex marriage and equality, while at the same time offering harsh assessments of his feminist critics and embracing the magazine's crude, sometimes bigoted depictions.

Feminist author Laura Kipnis compared Flynt to the ribald, French Renaissance satirist Rabelais, saying that she saw Hustler "as really dedicated to violating the proprieties that uphold class distinctions", and calling it "one of the most class-antagonistic publications in the country".

== Works about Flynt ==
=== Books ===
- Kipnis, Laura (1998). "(Male) desire and (female) disgust: Reading Hustler". Bound and Gagged: Pornography and the Politics of Fantasy in America. Duke University Press. ISBN 978-0822323433.
- Dines, Gail (2005). "King Kong and the white woman: Hustler magazine and the demonization of black masculinity". Not for Sale: Feminists resisting prostitution and pornography. North Melbourne, Victoria, Australia: Spiniflex Press. ISBN 978-1876756499.
- Flynt, Larry; Eisenbach, David (2011). One Nation Under Sex. New York: Palgrave Macmillan. ISBN 978-0230339927.

=== Films ===
- The People vs. Larry Flynt (dramatic film). Forman, Miloš (director). 1996. (Based on his life, featuring Woody Harrelson in the title role. Flynt makes cameo appearances as a judge and jury member.)
- Larry Flynt: The right to be left alone (documentary film). Brooker-Marks, Joan (director). 2007.
- Sticky: A (Self) Love Story (documentary film). Tana, Nicholas (director). 2016. (Interview with Flynt)
- Larry Flynt for President (2021) (documentary film). Director Nadia Szold.

=== Autobiography ===
- Flynt, Larry (2008) [1997]. An Unseemly Man: My life as a pornographer, pundit, and social outcast. Beverly Hills, CA: Phoenix Books. ISBN 978-1597775762.

== Other ==
Flynt appears in the music video "Afraid" by the American rock band Mötley Crüe which first aired on June 9, 1997.

In January 2019, Flynt discussed the importance of freedom and voting in America when he was interviewed by Weekly Alibi's August March.
