= Althea Flynt =

American model, publisher and wife of Larry Flynt (1953–1987)

- Born: Althea Sue Leasure; November 6, 1953; Marietta, Ohio, U.S.
- Died: June 27, 1987 (aged 33); Los Angeles, California, U.S.
- Resting place: Fernwood Cemetery Lockbourne, Franklin County, Ohio
- Occupation: Magazine publisher
- Spouse: Larry Flynt (m. 1976)

Althea Flynt (née Leasure; November 6, 1953 – June 27, 1987) was an American co-publisher of pornographic magazine Hustler, and the fourth wife of Larry Flynt.

== Early life ==
Althea Leasure was born November 6, 1953, in Marietta, Ohio. Althea and her four siblings came from an abusive home. When Althea was eight, her father Richard shot and killed her mother, June, her grandfather, and June's best friend and neighbor, before fatally shooting himself. Althea's grandmother was present during the incident, but survived by hiding in the nearby creek.

Althea and three of her siblings were later put into the OSSO Home (Ohio Soldiers and Sailors Orphanage) in Xenia, Ohio, which she ran away from multiple times after being sexually molested when sent to possible adopters' homes.

== Career ==
Althea met Larry Flynt at age 17 in 1971, when she applied for a job as a go-go dancer at his Hustler club in Columbus, Ohio. They were married on August 21, 1976. She was Hustler's first life-size centerfold, and as Publisher/Editor was involved with the development, management and publication of the magazine until her death; she ran the magazine and kept it afloat during Larry's "born again" experience brought on by a psychotic bipolar manic episode in 1977, his subsequent near-fatal crippling shooting in Georgia in 1978 and multiple bouts with bipolar disorder which also led to his campaign for President of the United States in 1984.

In the mid-1980s, Althea planned a new non-pornographic magazine called The Rage, to focus on the punk subculture. The Rage was ultimately abandoned due to the expense of Flynt's 1984 presidential run.

In 1982, Althea began using the drugs that Larry was prescribed for pain after he was shot in 1978, and developed an addiction. She was diagnosed with AIDS in 1983; Flynt stated that she contracted the disease from an untested blood transfusion during a hysterectomy, and that she always used clean needles when using drugs.

== Death ==
Althea died at age 33 when she drowned in the bathtub at the couple's Bel Air mansion in Los Angeles on June 27, 1987. According to reports, she passed out from a prescription drug overdose and drowned. Her husband, however, stated that at the time she was in the advanced stages of AIDS and would have died within that year, regardless. At that point, he was taking care of her and claimed that she was practically bedridden.

Althea Flynt was originally buried in the Flynt family cemetery plot, located on Lakeville in Salyersville, Kentucky. Her remains were disinterred in 2021 and moved to Ohio.

== In popular culture ==
Courtney Love portrayed Althea in the 1996 film The People vs. Larry Flynt, earning a Golden Globe nomination for her performance.
