= Primal Fear (film) =

1996 film directed by Gregory Hoblit

- Theatrical release poster
- Directed by: Gregory Hoblit
- Screenplay by: Steve Shagan; Ann Biderman
- Based on: Primal Fear by William Diehl
- Produced by: Gary Lucchesi; Howard W. Koch Jr.
- Starring: Richard Gere; Laura Linney; John Mahoney; Alfre Woodard; Frances McDormand; Edward Norton
- Cinematography: Michael Chapman
- Edited by: David Rosenbloom
- Music by: James Newton Howard
- Production company: Rysher Entertainment
- Distributed by: Paramount Pictures
- Release dates: April 1, 1996 (Los Angeles); April 5, 1996 (United States)
- Running time: 130 minutes
- Country: United States
- Language: English
- Budget: $30 million
- Box office: $102.6 million

Primal Fear is a 1996 American legal psychological thriller film directed by Gregory Hoblit, based on the 1993 novel of the same name by William Diehl, written by Steve Shagan and Ann Biderman. It stars Richard Gere, Laura Linney, John Mahoney, Alfre Woodard, Frances McDormand, and Edward Norton in his film debut. The film follows a Chicago-based defense attorney who believes that his client, an altar boy, is not guilty of murdering a Catholic bishop.

Primal Fear premiered in Los Angeles on April 1, 1996, before its wide release by Paramount Pictures on April 5. The film was a box-office success and received positive reviews, with Norton's performance earning critical praise. Norton won the Golden Globe Award for Best Supporting Actor – Motion Picture and was nominated for the Academy Award for Best Supporting Actor.

== Plot ==
Martin Vail is an arrogant Chicago defense attorney, known for defending undesirable but high-profile clients, including alleged mob boss Joey Piñero. Vail was previously a state prosecuting attorney, but after finding it to be a dead-end career, he became a defense attorney. Fond of the spotlight, Vail is profiled for a magazine cover story, then attempts to rekindle a casual relationship with a former colleague, prosecutor Janet Venable.

Publicly beloved Archbishop Rushman is found murdered and mutilated in his bedroom. Aaron Stampler, a 19-year-old altar boy from Kentucky, is caught fleeing the scene covered in blood and subsequently charged with murder. Vail offers to defend him pro bono. The meek, stuttering Aaron claims to be innocent, but is prone to amnesia and unable to remember what happened about the murder. He claims a third person was in the room. Vail believes Aaron, while the state's attorney, John Shaughnessy, assigns Venable to prosecute the case and pursue the death penalty. At Aaron's apartment, Vail's investigator, Tommy Goodman, is attacked by another altar boy, Alex, who flees. Neuropsychologist Dr. Molly Arrington interviews Aaron about his difficult childhood, his memory lapses, and his missing girlfriend, Linda.

With help from Piñero, Vail discovers that powerful civic leaders, including Shaughnessy, lost millions in real-estate investments due to Rushman's decision not to develop church-owned land, which includes a pro bono clinic owned and operated by Piñero. A passage linked to The Scarlet Letter was carved into Rushman's chest, which the police interpret as the murder motive and denouncing the archbishop as "two-faced". Vail and Goodman find Alex, who claims he was searching for an incriminating VHS cassette in Aaron's apartment. Removing the tape from the archbishop's closet at the crime scene, thus not properly entering it into the chain of custody, Vail and his team discover footage filmed by the archbishop in which he coerces Aaron, Linda, and Alex to engage in sexual acts. Vail and his team assume that Rushman threatened the youths with eviction from their group home, providing a motive for Aaron to murder Rushman.

Vail angrily confronts Aaron about concealing information, but he denies the accusations, becoming increasingly distressed as he continues to press him. Aaron's demeanor abruptly shifts from deferential to aggressive, and he chastises Vail for "scaring off" Aaron. This violent personality, calling himself Roy, admits to killing the archbishop but warns Vail not to introduce the tape at trial. Reverting to his docile personality, Aaron states that he has no recollection of the episode. Dr. Arrington concludes that Aaron has dissociative identity disorder caused by years of abuse by both his father and, later, Rushman. Vail grows conflicted, knowing that his client could be acquitted via an insanity defense, but he cannot change his plea mid-trial.

Vail delivers the tape anonymously to Venable, expecting that she will use it to prove Aaron's motive, despite the risk of tarnishing the archbishop and generating sympathy for Aaron. Shaughnessy demands that she destroy the evidence, but she refuses and introduces it in court. The murdered Piñero's body is discovered and Vail surprises the court by calling Shaughnessy as a witness. Vail suggests that he resented the archbishop for stopping the $60 million land-development deal and accuses him of concealing previous evidence of the archbishop's sexual predation as well as being complicit in Piñero's death.

The judge intervenes and fines Vail for using the courtroom for his personal vendettas. The judge dismisses some of Dr. Arrington's testimony about Aaron's amnesia as it leans too close to an insanity plea. Vail calls Aaron to the stand, intentionally triggering him to become Roy, who screams obscenities and assaults Venable. The judge dismisses the jury in favor of a bench trial to declare Aaron not guilty by reason of insanity. Vail informs Aaron that he will be remanded to a psychiatric hospital for treatment and likely released. When Aaron expresses remorse for hurting Venable, Vail realizes that he never had a split identity. Aaron commends the attorney for his insight, bragging that he murdered Linda and Rushman without remorse. Vail asks Aaron whether there ever really was a "Roy", prompting him to reply that there was never in fact an "Aaron". Vail leaves the courthouse, defeated.

== Cast ==
- Richard Gere as Defense Attorney Martin Vail
- Edward Norton as Aaron Luke Stampler, the defendant
- Laura Linney as Prosecutor Janet Venable
- Andre Braugher as Tommy Goodman, Vail's investigator
- Maura Tierney as Naomi, Vail's assistant
- Frances McDormand as Dr. Molly Arrington
- John Mahoney as District Attorney John Shaughnessy
- Terry O'Quinn as Chief Deputy District Attorney Bud Yancy
- Alfre Woodard as Judge Miriam Shoat
- Steven Bauer as Joey Piñero, a local crime boss and Vail's client
- Tony Plana as Alderman Martinez
- Reg Rogers as Jack Connerman, a journalist who has been interviewing Vail
- Joe Spano as Police Captain Abel Stenner
- Jon Seda as Alex, a former altar boy
- Azalea Davila as Linda Forbes
- Stanley Anderson as Archbishop Richard Rushman

Several Chicago television news personalities made cameos as themselves as they deliver reports about the case, including WLS's Diann Burns and Linda Yu, WBBM-TV's Mary Ann Childers, Lester Holt and Jon Duncanson, and WGN-TV's Bob Jordan and Randy Salerno.

== Production ==
Paramount wanted Leonardo DiCaprio as Aaron Stampler; he was offered the role, but declined as he found the script "problematic". Casting calls were set in California and England where 2,100 actors were seen for the role of Aaron, including Matt Damon, James Van Der Beek, and Pedro Pascal. Connie Britton declined the role of Naomi, which went to Maura Tierney. Primal Fear was filmed in several locations, including Chicago, Illinois; Keystone, West Virginia; and Los Angeles, California. The movie also used Paramount Studios in Hollywood for some scenes. Filming took place between April 28, 1995, and July 12, 1995.

=== Soundtrack ===
The soundtrack includes the Portuguese fado song "Canção do Mar" sung by Dulce Pontes.

== Release and reception ==
=== Box office ===
The film was released on April 5, 1996, and opened in the #1 spot, remaining there for three consecutive weeks. It grossed $56.1 million domestically and $46.5 million internationally for a total worldwide gross of $102.6 million.

=== Home media ===
The film was released to VHS and LaserDisc on October 15, 1996. On October 21, 1998, it was released to DVD.

Paramount released Primal Fear on Blu-ray on March 10, 2009. The Blu-ray includes an audio commentary track by director Gregory Hoblit, writer Ann Biderman, producer Gary Lucchesi, executive producer Hawk Koch, and casting director Deborah Aquila, as well as the featurettes "Primal Fear: The Final Verdict", "Primal Fear: Star Witness-Casting Edward Norton", and "The Psychology of Guilt".

=== Critical response ===
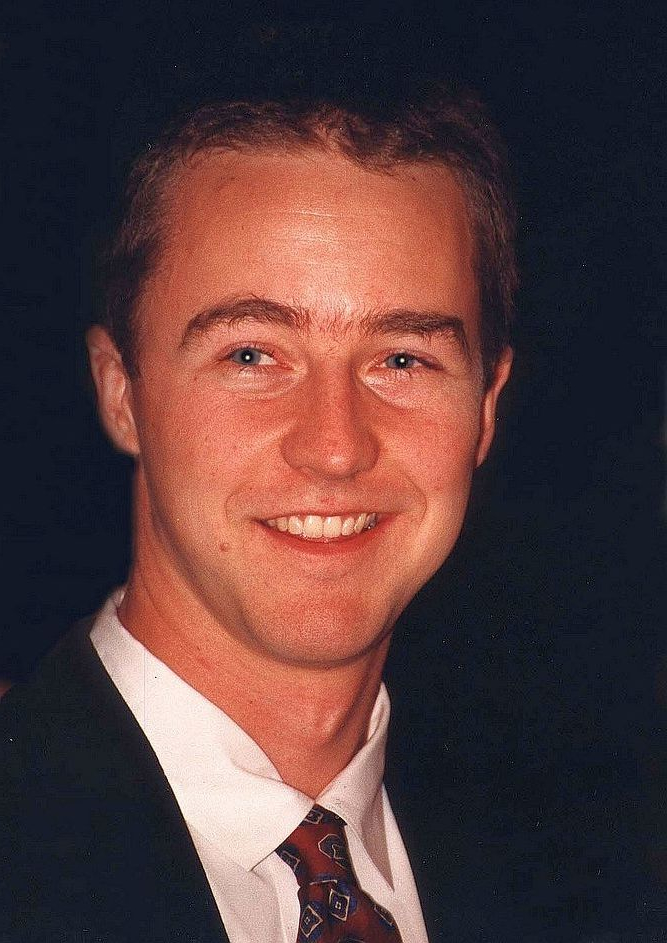
Edward Norton's debut performance received critical acclaim, earning him the Golden Globe Award for Best Supporting Actor – Motion Picture, in addition to a nomination for the Academy Award for Best Supporting Actor.

Review aggregation website Rotten Tomatoes reports an approval rating of 77% based on 48 reviews, with an average rating of 6.8/10. The site's critics consensus reads: "Primal Fear is a straightforward, yet entertaining thriller elevated by a crackerjack performance from Edward Norton". Metacritic, which uses a weighted average, lists the film with a weighted average score of 47/100 based on 18 critics, indicating "mixed or average reviews". Audiences surveyed by CinemaScore awarded the film an average grade of B+ on an A+-to-F scale.

Janet Maslin of The New York Times wrote that the film has a "good deal of surface charm" but "the story relies on an overload of tangential subplots to keep it looking busy". Roger Ebert of the Chicago Sun-Times awarded Primal Fear three and a half stars, writing that "the plot is as good as crime procedurals get, but the movie is really better than its plot because of the three-dimensional characters". Ebert described Gere's performance as one of the best in his career, praised Linney for rising above what might have been a stock character and applauded Norton for offering a "completely convincing" portrayal.

=== Accolades ===
Award	Category	Nominee(s)	Result	Ref.
20/20 Awards	Best Supporting Actor	Edward Norton	Nominated	
Academy Awards	Best Supporting Actor	Edward Norton	Nominated	
ASCAP Film and Television Music Awards	Top Box Office Films	James Newton Howard	Won	
Awards Circuit Community Awards	Best Actor in a Supporting Role	Edward Norton	Runner-up	
Awards Circuit Community Awards	Honorable Mentions	Gregory Hoblit	Nominated	
Boston Society of Film Critics Awards	Best Supporting Actor	Edward Norton	Won	
British Academy Film Awards	Best Actor in a Supporting Role	Edward Norton	Nominated	
Casting Society of America	Outstanding Achievement in Feature Film Casting – Drama	Deborah Aquila and Jane Shannon-Smith	Nominated	
Chicago Film Critics Association Awards	Best Supporting Actor	Edward Norton	Nominated	
Chicago Film Critics Association Awards	Most Promising Actor	Edward Norton	Won	
Critics Choice Awards	Best Supporting Actor	Edward Norton	Nominated	
Florida Film Critics Circle Awards	Best Supporting Actor	Edward Norton	Won	
Golden Globe Awards	Best Supporting Actor – Motion Picture	Edward Norton	Won	
Kansas City Film Critics Circle Awards	Best Supporting Actor	Edward Norton	Won	
Los Angeles Film Critics Association Awards	Best Supporting Actor	Edward Norton	Won	
MTV Movie Awards	Best Villain	Edward Norton	Nominated	
National Society of Film Critics Awards	Best Supporting Actor	Edward Norton	3rd Place	
Online Film & Television Association Awards	Best Supporting Actor	Edward Norton	Won	
Satellite Awards	Best DVD Extras	Primal Fear – Hard Evidence Edition	Nominated	
Saturn Awards	Best Supporting Actor	Edward Norton	Nominated	
Society of Texas Film Critics Awards	Best Supporting Actor	Edward Norton	Won	
Southeastern Film Critics Association Awards	Best Supporting Actor	Edward Norton	Won	

Norton was also nominated for the BAFTA Award for Best Actor in a Supporting Role. The film is recognized by American Film Institute in these lists:

- 2003: AFI's 100 Years...100 Heroes and Villains:
  - Aaron Stampler – Nominated Villain
- 2008: AFI's 10 Top 10:
  - Nominated Courtroom Drama Film

=== Legacy ===
The first half of the 2002 India Hindi film Deewangee is inspired from Primal Fear.

The 2021 Indian Hindi-language legal thriller drama film, Nail Polish, is also similarly inspired by this movie.

== See also ==
- Mental illness in films
- Plot twist – Narrative technique
