= Alan Isaacman =

American lawyer

Alan L. Isaacman
- Born: July 12, 1942 (age 84); Harrisburg, Pennsylvania, United States
- Occupation: Attorney

Alan L. Isaacman (/ˈaɪzəkmən/ EYE-zək-mən; born July 12, 1942) is an American lawyer primarily famous for serving as attorney for publisher Larry Flynt. His past clients also include Geraldo Rivera, Kathy Griffin, Rock Hudson and CBS, Inc.

== Education ==
Isaacman grew up in Harrisburg, Pennsylvania and graduated from Pennsylvania State University (earning a Bachelor of Science in 1964) and Harvard Law School (earning a J.D. in 1967). In 1968, he was admitted to the California State Bar. He also served as a law clerk to Judge Harry Pregerson in the United States District Court for the Central District of California from 1969 to 1970.

== Professional career ==
In 1988, he successfully argued the case Hustler Magazine v. Falwell before the Supreme Court of the United States, which subsequently became a significant free speech case in the history of American jurisprudence.

== Personal life ==
Isaacman lives in Beverly Hills, California. His son David is a cast member on Love on the Spectrum.

== In fiction ==
Isaacman was played by Edward Norton in the 1996 film The People vs. Larry Flynt. Some details in the film were fictionalized, including the scene showing Isaacman being wounded in the 1978 sniper shooting of Flynt. The actual lawyer who was shot was Gene Reeves, Jr., a Flynt attorney based in Lawrenceville, Georgia, where the shooting took place.
