= Death of Joan Robinson Hill =

1969 death in Texas

The death of Joan Robinson Hill at 38 years old led to her husband, John Hill, becoming the first person to be indicted by the State of Texas on the charge of murder by omission. The case precipitated a series of events that included the 1972 murder of John Hill and, two years later, the fatal police shooting of the man accused of that murder.

She died following a short illness on March 19, 1969. Autopsy examinations failed to determine a cause of death beyond an infection from an unknown source. Her father, Ash Robinson, subsequently accused Hill of poisoning his daughter, and petitioned the district attorney to prosecute her husband for murder. Hill's murder trial was held in February 1971 but ended in a mistrial. As a second trial was approaching, Hill was gunned down by an intruder at his home. A suspect, Bobby Wayne Vandiver, was arrested and indicted for the murder, but was killed in a shootout with police before his trial. Two other suspects, Marcia McKittrick and Lilla Paulus, were convicted as accomplices to Hill's murder and served time in prison.

The case was the subject of Thomas Thompson's 1976 book Blood and Money and the 1981 made-for-television film Murder in Texas.

== Background ==
On September 28, 1957, Joan Robinson married Dr. John Hill, described by the Houston Chronicle as "one of the city's leading plastic surgeons". The couple had a son, Robert Ashton "Boot" Hill, born on June 14, 1960.

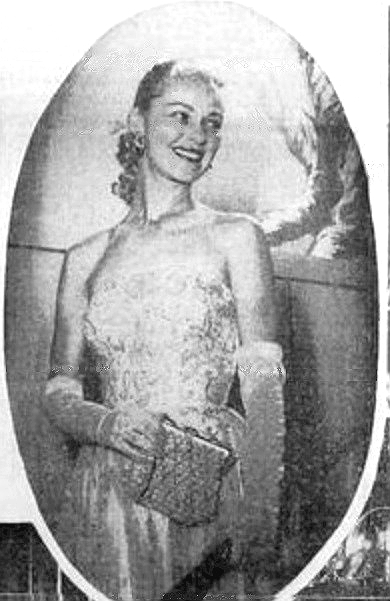
Robinson Hill as chairman of Houston's Humane Society Ball, 1959

John and Joan Hill became a regular part of Houston's social scene, but largely led separate lives. Joan focused on her equestrian career while John devoted his spare time to performing and listening to music.

By 1968, the Hills had begun to have significant conflicts in their marriage. After beginning an extramarital affair with a woman named Ann Kurth in the fall of 1968, Hill left his wife and began divorce proceedings against her, but withdrew the petition when the couple reconciled shortly before Christmas of that year. John continued to see Kurth after returning to live with his wife. Robinson Hill died on March 19, 1969, at Sharpstown General Hospital after contracting an illness that was initially thought to be influenza. Her symptoms included fever, vomiting, nausea, and diarrhea. She was first treated at home by her husband, but admitted to hospital when her condition worsened.

== Death, investigation, and trials ==
=== Death ===
Robinson Hill died on March 19, 1969, at Sharpstown General Hospital shortly after contracting an illness that was initially thought to be influenza.

Upon being told that his wife was dead, John Hill's cries were so loud that they were heard by patients on the second floor of the building. Hill managed to ask someone to call a friend and his wife, who lived nearby. Jim Oates was a doctor and a fellow musician; his wife, Dottie, was a nurse. The couple had just seen the Hills five days earlier at Houston's annual wild game dinner. Dottie Oates did not at first recognize Joan Robinson Hill, due to her edema and discoloration from ruptured superficial blood vessels.

=== First autopsy ===
Texas state law at the time required an autopsy by the county coroner for anyone who died in a hospital within twenty-four hours of admission. The law stated that the autopsy must be performed and a cause of death determined before any embalming or burial could take place, and provided criminal penalties for its breach. Drs. Bertinot and Lanza, who had attended Robinson Hill, were summoned back to the hospital when she died. Dr. Bertinot spoke to John Hill about the legal need for an autopsy and called the hospital's pathologist to start the process. Hill asked Jim Oates to call a local funeral home to claim Robinson Hill's body. Less than four hours after her death, the funeral home removed Robinson Hill's body from the hospital.

Within an hour after moving the body from Sharpstown General, the funeral home began the process of embalming Robinson Hill's body. The hospital's pathologist, Dr. Arthur Morse, arrived at the funeral home at 10 a.m. to carry out the autopsy, only to find that the body had already been embalmed. Dr. Morse did not have the ability to take blood samples, since Robinson Hill's blood had been replaced by the embalming fluid. Morse concluded his autopsy at 11:30 a.m. without finding any signs of what caused Robinson Hill's death aside from a maroon coloration of her pancreas and offered an opinion that she may have died from pancreatitis.

=== Second autopsy ===
On Thursday, March 20, 1969, Diane Settegast and Eunice Woolen, who stayed with the Hills as house guests a week before Joan's death, returned to Houston to attend Robinson Hill's funeral, and Settegast called on Hill to pay her respects. On arriving at the house she found him upstairs in the music room with his son and some friends, watching a Laurel and Hardy film and laughing. Surprised that he did not appear to be grieving, she began to leave in disgust, but was stopped by Hill before she reached the front door. During the ensuing conversation, she expressed disbelief at the speed of her friend's death, and asked Hill why he had not been able to help her. Hill replied that he wanted to take his wife to hospital but she refused to go, saying "You know what she was like about hospitals". Settegast became suspicious as she did not recognize Hill's observation of her friend, and voiced her concerns to Ash Robinson. Since receiving Dr. Morse's opinion that his daughter had died from pancreatitis, Robinson had been consulting doctors on the matter, who had advised him that this was an unlikely cause of death. On the morning of Friday, March 21, the day of Joan Robinson Hill's funeral, Ash Robinson visited the office of Assistant District Attorney I. D. McMaster, where he accused John Hill of killing his wife, telling McMaster of the circumstances surrounding her death and autopsy. After listening to Robinson's story, McMaster said that he would look into it, then telephoned Harris County Medical Examiner Joseph Jachimczyk, telling him to go to the funeral home, examine the body before the funeral, and stop the service if necessary. Jachimczyk then telephoned two people–the administrator of Sharpstown Hospital, and Morse. On hearing of the circumstances in which Morse had performed his autopsy, he ordered the pathologist to hand over blood and urine specimens taken from Robinson Hill, and his preliminary report. Jachimczyk felt there was enough material for him to perform his own autopsy. He then drove to the funeral home to view the body, doing so as mourners began to arrive for the service, but saw no need to halt proceedings.

While awaiting the medical examiner's results, Ash Robinson continued to gather evidence against his son-in-law, assembling a team of respected doctors at his home to discuss the case. These included his general practitioner, Ed Gouldin, and Grady Hallman. Robinson also took statements from people connected with his daughter, including Settegast, Woolen, and the Hill's household employees Archie and Effie Green. Jachimczyk delivered his report on the second autopsy at the end of March, ruling out any poisoning, and concluding, "it is my opinion based upon a reasonable probability that the cause of death is due to acute focal hepatitis, probably viral in origin." On reading the report, McMaster felt there was no case, but Robinson refused to believe that no crime had been committed. He hired lawyer Frank Briscoe, a former Harris County District Attorney who had recently left office. As part of his investigation, Briscoe spoke to Morse. He asked the pathologist whether it would be possible to inject someone with hepatitis. Morse felt this an unlikely scenario, but offered the lawyer an alternative opinion on how Robinson Hill may have contracted the virus. He said that he had been told that in the days prior to her death Robinson Hill had eaten both shellfish and snails, and Morse felt one of these may have caused her to contract hepatitis. Robinson then petitioned his son-in-law to give permission for Joan's body to be exhumed for another autopsy, but Hill refused.

=== Third autopsy ===
Ash Robinson sought to hire "the best pathologist in the United States" to conduct another autopsy on his daughter. Robinson's search led him to Dr. Milton Helpern, who was the chief medical examiner for New York City at the time. Helpern agreed to come to Houston to examine Robinson Hill's body five months after her death. An autopsy was also requested by a Harris County grand jury investigating the death of Robinson Hill. That autopsy was performed by a team of ten doctors led by Dr. Robert Bucklin, who was then the medical examiner for Galveston County, and including Dr. Helpern, who was deputized as an acting Harris County medical examiner.

As soon as the casket was opened, Helpern found pieces of dried mud in it, indicating that the casket had been opened after Robinson Hill was originally buried. When questioned, the funeral home informed the medical team present at the autopsy that John Hill had obtained an order to disinter his wife three days after her funeral. Hill claimed he wanted to retrieve a piece of jewelry that had been buried with her. While making the wake and funeral arrangements, Hill insisted that his wife be buried with no jewelry at all—not even her wedding ring. Helpern found nothing amiss related to the disinterment, but noted that Robinson Hill's stomach and its contents were never removed and examined at the original autopsy. The pathologist's disapproval became disbelief when he discovered that Robinson Hill's brain and heart were missing.

Dr. Morse then made an embarrassed admission to not returning the organs prior to burial. Morse offered that he did, however, know the whereabouts of Robinson Hill's brain—it was in the trunk of his car. The Texas pathologist retrieved the brain for Dr. Helpern's examination. Helpern thought there might be traces of meningitis, but declined to state whether he thought this was a cause of Robinson Hill's death. (Note: When another doctor stated that he saw no evidence of meningitis in Robinson Hill's spinal cord, rumors began to circulate that the brain Morse produced from his car trunk was not the brain of Joan Robinson Hill. When issuing his findings, Dr. Helpern discounted the rumors.) He examined the body of Joan Robinson Hill for seven and a half hours; Helpern then went back to New York with his tissue samples, saying he would issue a report on his findings at a later date.

The series of autopsies indicated that Robinson Hill had suffered a "massive infection" from an undetermined source, but because the body had been embalmed before an initial examination was conducted, an exact cause of death could not be identified. The hospital and the Harris County medical examiner initially listed Robinson Hill's cause of death as hepatitis, but there were no signs of the disease (such as jaundice) noted; medical test results were also not indicative of hepatitis. Dr. Bucklin listed Robinson Hill's cause of death as meningitis and sepsis. Following the autopsy, Joseph Jachimczyk issued a fresh report in which he observed "It is now my opinion that Joan Robinson Hill came to her death as a result of a fulminating infectious process, the specific nature of which is no longer determinable." He went on to recommend that the matter be investigated by a grand jury. Dr. Milton Helpern did not issue his report until April 1970, more than a year after the death of Robinson Hill. Helpern's report noted that John Hill's treatment of his wife at home and the delay in seeking specialized medical attention at a hospital were factors in the death of Robinson Hill.

=== The will ===
When John Hill filed his wife's last will and testament shortly after her death, Ash Robinson quickly produced another will, which he said had been written at the time Joan was separated from Hill. The will made Robinson her executor, left everything to him, and asked that Robinson and his wife have custody of the Hills' son, Robert. It was signed by two of Robinson's friends, one a former employee. Hill believed the will to be a forgery and hired three handwriting experts to attest to that fact. Thompson observes that Robinson Hill's signature was different from that in a previous will, and that the will had been "clumsily typed, replete with spelling mistakes and language more likely to be used by someone imitating legal terminology". Hill asked the District Attorney's office to investigate, but Cecil Haden, who was serving on the grand jury at the time, suggested the matter be dealt with once the issue of Robinson Hill's death had been addressed. Robert Hill contested the will in 1978, claiming that it was a forgery, but a probate jury found in favor of Robinson.

=== Prosecution of John Hill ===
After Robinson Hill's death, Hill married Ann Kurth in June 1969, but divorced Kurth less than a year later, shortly before he was indicted for the murder of Robinson Hill. He divorced Kurth in spite of the advice of his defense attorney, who told him that if they remained married, Kurth could not testify against him.

Following Hill's marriage to Kurth, Ash Robinson accused his former son-in-law of poisoning his daughter, and hired a team of private detectives to keep him under surveillance. He also petitioned the District Attorney to launch a murder investigation. Frank Briscoe subsequently discussed the case with McMaster, who had worked as his junior during his time as a District Attorney. Neither man was convinced that Hill had murdered his wife, but they felt that there was enough evidence to put the matter before a grand jury. The grand jury began hearing evidence in the summer of 1969, and rumors began to circulate among the Houston medical fraternity that Hill had played a role in Robinson Hill's death. In response to the gossip, Hill contacted Clyde Wilson, a private investigator who had worked for Robinson. Wilson suggested that if Hill wished to clear his name, he should take a polygraph test. Hill decided instead to give a statement under the administration of sodium pentothal (alternatively known as truth serum) at which his own lawyer and McMaster would be present. The drug was administered at Sharpstown Hospital by anesthesiologist Dr. Richard Smith, who had occasionally assisted Hill during surgery, but who both sides felt would be a neutral party. Although Hill was deemed to have passed the examination, McMaster was suspicious that the drug had not worked properly because he felt that Hill's answers seemed too composed.

The first grand jury to examine the case retired without indicting Hill. Robinson then urged Briscoe to pressure the District Attorney to order an exhumation, then fired the lawyer when he refused, after which he retained the services of the law firm Vinson and Elkins. District Attorney Carol Vance then put the case before a second grand jury to see if they would order an exhumation. When they did, Hill hired his own lawyer, Don Fullenweider, who asked his partner, respected defense attorney Richard Haynes, to represent the doctor.

In February 1970, the case was heard by a third grand jury, on which sat Cecil Haden, a prominent Houston businessman and close friend and associate of Ash Robinson. This panel heard testimony from Ann Kurth, less than one day after she was divorced from Hill on March 12. She told them that Hill had confessed to killing his wife and had also tried to kill Kurth on three occasions, and that the physician had medicated himself with an antidote to the sodium pentothal prior to the test, a claim Richard Smith dismissed as implausible. (Note: On hearing Kurth's claims about Hill's alleged self-medication, Smith said "I don't care if John Hill injected himself with holy water, he was still anesthetized. There's no antidote to the anesthetist's skill and experience, and that's what put John Hill under.") Helpern was preparing his autopsy report as the jury neared the end of its 90-day term, but would not complete it in time for his findings to be heard. Haden suggested that Helpern present his conclusions in person. District Judge Wendell Odom agreed, and Helpern presented his findings in April 1970. In response to Helpern's presentation, Haynes suggested that Hill testify before the grand jury, but the evidence Hill gave contradicted that given by others involved in the case, and his cool and aloof manner began to convince McMaster and his fellow Assistant District Attorney, Ernie Ernst, that Hill had murdered his wife. In spite of this, they determined that there was not enough evidence to indict him. However, following some research, Ernst suggested that they could try him for failing to provide an adequate level of care, which had resulted in her death. The jury voted 10–2 to indict Hill for murder by omission, deciding that he had "willfully, intentionally and culpably" contributed to his wife's death because he had not given her sufficient medical help. The state of Texas had not previously indicted anyone on a charge of murder by omission.

Hill's murder trial began on February 15, 1971, before Judge Frederick Hooey. The case was prosecuted by McMaster and Ernst, while Hill was defended by Richard Haynes. Robinson Hill's friend and neighbor Vann Maxwell was the first witness to give evidence, and testified that Robinson Hill had said shortly before her death that she had given up on her marriage. Kurth testified against Hill, claiming that he had tried to kill her on June 30, 1969, by crashing their car into a bridge, and by injecting her with a hypodermic syringe. She also told the court that he had confessed to killing Robinson Hill. Kurth claimed to have seen three petri dishes in the bathroom of John Hill's apartment during the time Joan Robinson Hill became ill. She said they had "something red in them" and when she asked Hill about it, he told her he was conducting an experiment. Kurth testified that Hill was annoyed at her discovery and the next day, when she found some pastries in the apartment's refrigerator, he became annoyed again, telling her not to eat them.

Kurth said that on the night of their auto accident, Hill went into detail about how he had killed Joan Robinson Hill. She claimed that the petri dishes contained cultures grown from all forms of human waste, and that Hill had initially injected the cultures into pastries he served to his wife. When Robinson Hill fell only mildly ill from their ingestion, she asked her husband for something to cure the illness. Kurth's testimony continued by saying that Hill then added the cultures to an injectable drug which he administered to Robinson Hill. As a result of Kurth's testimony, Haynes called for a mistrial, a request to which Hooey agreed after some deliberation. In June 1971, John Hill was married for a third time, to Connie Loesby. Hill's second trial was scheduled to begin in July 1971, but at the request of the defense, it was delayed multiple times, to November 1972.

=== Murder of John Hill ===
On September 24, 1972, a few weeks before the second trial was to start, Hill was shot dead by a masked gunman at his mansion as Hill and his wife returned home from a medical conference in Las Vegas. The masked intruder forced his way into the Hills' home about a half hour before John and Connie Hill were due to arrive home. The man bound Hill's mother and son and taped their mouths with adhesive tape. When the Hills arrived, Connie rang the home's doorbell and was greeted by someone in a green mask she initially thought to be her stepson playing a joke. The intruder grabbed Connie Hill, saying "This is a robbery." She was able to struggle away from him and run down the street. As she ran and called out for help, she heard shots fired. A neighbor heard her cries for help, let her in, and let her call the police. When the police and an ambulance arrived at the Hill home, they found John Hill in the foyer, face down. Standing over him was his 12-year-old son; feet and arms bound, he had managed to hop from a back room of the house. The adhesive tape had come loose from his mouth and he cried, "They've killed my daddy." The ambulance attendant searched for vital signs but found none. When the body was turned over, Hill's eyes, nose and mouth were found to have been sealed shut with adhesive tape by his killer. The police noted this type of killing was prevalent in the local underworld. John Hill was beaten and shot three times: in the chest, shoulder and right arm.

Connie and Robert Hill believed that Robinson Hill's father, Ash Robinson, had ordered Hill's execution, and launched a $7.6 million lawsuit against him for wrongful death. Robinson denied responsibility for the shooting, but maintained that Hill was to blame for the death of his daughter. In 1977, following a seven-week hearing, a civil jury cleared Robinson of any involvement in the death of his son-in-law.

During the wrongful death suit against Ash Robinson, Thomas Thompson, the author of Blood and Money, offered an opinion that Hill probably did not have enough medical knowledge to kill his wife without leaving any evidence. Thompson, who had observed many doctors while writing books, described plastic surgeons and orthopedists as being the "carpenters" of the medical world. He characterized internists and researchers as being the real thinkers of medicine, and said that Hill's interest in research applied only to the music world.

==== Arrest and trial of Bobby Vandiver and Marcia McKittrick ====
Houston detectives Jerry Carpenter and Joe Gamino were called to River Oaks after a boy discovered Hill's abandoned briefcase, which had been stolen during the murder. While searching the scene, Carpenter found a gun beneath a bush. A ballistics expert was able to determine that the bullets fired at Hill had been handmade, and as a result of this Houston police were able to trace the weapon to a doctor. (Note: Thompson identifies the doctor as Orrin Staves, while court records name him as William Mitchell.) When questioned as to how the weapon had found its way to River Oaks, the doctor said it had been stolen by a woman whom he described as "a whore". He went on to explain that he had entertained two sex workers, who stole some money and one of his cars while he was sleeping. He had taken the gun and planned to go looking for the women, but as he was about to leave, he was called by another sex worker who called herself Dusty, who asked if he wanted company. While she was with him, he said, she took the gun. He then said he believed Dusty's real name was Marcia McKittrick. (Note: The doctor later testified that he gave the gun to McKittrick.) Carpenter, a former vice squad officer, used his old contacts to trace McKittrick, and discovered she was involved with Bobby Wayne Vandiver, a habitual criminal who had established himself as a pimp following his most recent release from prison.

Vandiver was arrested in April 1973, but refused to cooperate with police until he was positively identified as the perpetrator by Hill's mother. When he confessed to the murder, he told police he had done it for financial gain. During his confession, Vandiver implicated McKittrick and Lilla Paulus, a former sex worker from Houston, as having been accessories to Hill's murder. He claimed that the shooting was a contract killing that he had been asked to carry out for $5,000. He told detectives "[Paulus] told me the contract was on a doctor who had killed his wife. And that it was the wife's father who was wanting him dead." During several days of police interrogation, Vandiver told Detectives Carpenter and Gamino that Lilla Paulus had first mentioned the contract in the summer of 1972, but that he had never intended to go through with it. He said that after he agreed to kill Hill, McKittrick telephoned Hill's office to arrange an appointment with the surgeon, but was told he was in Las Vegas. They subsequently traveled to Las Vegas to carry out the killing there, but could not find Hill, so they returned to Houston. After Vandiver killed the doctor at his home, he fled with McKittrick to Los Angeles, where they shared an apartment for several months, but they frequently quarreled, and returned separately to Texas in 1973.

On April 25, 1973, a grand jury voted to indict Vandiver and McKittrick for first degree murder, and indict Paulus as an accomplice to murder. Vandiver's trial was set for September 1973. In the meantime, District Attorney Bob Bennett arranged for him to live at a motel with his wife, Vicki. She had found a job as a waitress, but he was required to stay in his room unless accompanied by someone from the District Attorney's office. Vicki was in the process of seeking custody of her children from a previous marriage, and in June 1973, Vandiver asked Bennett if he could travel with her to Dallas while the case was heard. Bennett granted the request on the condition that Vandiver check in with him on a regular basis. Vandiver showed up as promised in September, only to learn that the trial had been postponed, and Bennett reluctantly allowed him to return to Dallas. The trial was eventually rescheduled for April 1974, but Vandiver failed to appear. He went on the run and moved to Longview, Texas, adopting the alias J. C. Sheridan and trying to maintain a low profile. However, Longview police officer John Raymer grew suspicious of the newcomer to his town. After discovering the man's first name was actually Bobby, Raymer confronted Vandiver at a cafe one evening in May; Vandiver pulled a gun, and Raymer shot him dead.

McKittrick remained at large for several months, but was finally arrested in Dallas on September 21, 1973, after attempting to cash a forged payroll check at a drive-in bank. Under questioning, she corroborated Vandiver's story, and also told Carpenter and Gamino that she had met Ash Robinson while she was staying with Lilla Paulus in 1972. McKittrick claimed that Robinson had said he would do anything to get custody of his grandson, but that the only way that would happen was if Hill was dead. She said that Robinson and Paulus had met frequently at Ben Taub Hospital, where money was handed over, and that Robinson had also visited Paulus at her home, where he gave her plans of Hill's home and $7,000 on the day of the shooting. McKittrick was scheduled to be tried in 1974, alongside Paulus. However, Paulus's lawyer, Dick DeGuerin, argued for Vandiver's evidence to be dismissed under the Sixth Amendment, which gives a defendant the right to confront their accuser; the request was granted. DeGuerin also asked for McKittrick's evidence against Paulus to be ruled as inadmissible. But although this request was also granted, presiding Judge Price ruled that McKittrick's evidence could be used in the state's case against her. McKittrick's attorney, John Caperton, then sought consensus for her to enter a not guilty plea, but accept a guilty verdict, something to which Bennett agreed. McKittrick was convicted of being Vandiver's getaway driver and given a ten-year jail sentence. She was paroled after serving five years.

==== Trial and conviction of Lilla Paulus ====
As McKittrick was led from the court, Bennett asked her to give evidence against Paulus, but she was initially reluctant to do so. She continued to resist until the case against Paulus was heard in February 1975. At the trial, McKittrick testified that Robinson had paid Paulus $25,000 to find someone to eliminate Hill, and that in turn, Paulus had paid Vandiver $5,000 to carry out the murder. McKittrick and Robinson both passed polygraph tests. The results indicated that McKittrick was being truthful when she stated that Robinson had caused John Hill's death and that Robinson was telling the truth when he said he had nothing to do with Hill's murder. Bennett also produced evidence that Ash Robinson had taken out a private telephone number, which had been found written on a scrap of paper in Paulus's handbag. (Note: The private telephone line was said to have been installed at the Robinson home on September 21, 1972—three days before the shooting death of John Hill. Robinson testified that he did not have the private line installed until a week after his former son-in-law's death and that he did this due to crank calls he received after Hill's murder.) DeGuerin then sought to portray McKittrick as a liar by calling Paulus to the witness stand, a strategy that was almost successful until Paulus deviated from the agreed testimony. She had sought to portray herself as a respectable widow who had taken pity on McKittrick. However, after telling the court that she did not know Vandiver, but had taken McKittrick into her home after a friend of her late husband had introduced them in the spring of 1972, Paulus offered comment on the difference between the two women's lifestyles. She told the court "I liked [McKittrick] even though you could gather from her conversation that her life was just a little bit different from mine".

Paulus claimed to know nothing of McKittrick's past, but Bennett thought her comparison of the two women's lifestyles was unusual if she was telling the truth. He knew that several years earlier she had been arrested on vagrancy and prostitution charges, and he sought a way to impeach her testimony. An officer who had arrested her, Lieutenant Allbright, then testified, casting doubt on her credibility, after which Bennett eventually persuaded Paulus's daughter, Mary Jo Wood, to give evidence against her. The relationship between mother and daughter had soured some years previously, after Paulus had disapproved of a man Wood was dating, attempted to have them both killed, then had her daughter confined to a mental hospital. Wood had escaped from the institution and fled with the man to another state, where the couple married, and she was afraid to return to Texas. She agreed to testify only after Bennett assured her that the District Attorney's office would ensure her protection while she was in Houston. Bennett introduced Mary Jo Wood as a surprise witness. She went on to testify that when Wood was a young girl, Paulus had owned several properties on Galveston's Post Office Street, a notorious red-light district, that were operated as brothels. She also said that Paulus had accepted payment from a man who wished to perform a sexual act with Wood. Wood testified that she and her mother met Joan Robinson Hill through Diane Settegast around 1963. While at Robinson Hill's home, the women also met Ash Robinson. Wood said that she and her mother occasionally sat in the Robinson box at horse shows. When Wood visited her mother in December 1970, she claimed she was told by Paulus of a call from Settegast, saying that Robinson wanted to hire someone to kill John Hill.

Diane Settegast testified that she had known the Robinson family since 1952 and had met Paulus in 1957 or 1958. She denied telling Paulus that Ash Robinson wanted someone to kill his former son-in-law. Settegast, who had stayed at Paulus's home during the first murder trial for Hill, said she did have three telephone numbers for Ash Robinson; she believed she received the third number after the murder of John Hill and may have given the number in question to Paulus. She continued by saying that she had seen Paulus in the company of Ash Robinson only once; it was at Chatsworth Farm during the 1968 holiday season. (Note: Joan Jaworski (Moncrief) Worrell, the daughter of prosecutor Leon Jaworski, was also a longtime friend of the Robinson family. Worrell testified that she had seen Lilla Paulus and Ash Robinson together at Chatsworth Farm in 1965 and in 1969, before Robinson Hill's death. She said she saw Robinson and Paulus together at a restaurant in New Orleans, in April 1970, when Worrell was a guest at the city's Fairmont Hotel.)

Paulus was convicted and given a 35-year sentence. Robinson claimed that Paulus had loved his daughter and that her actions were born out of a sense of justice for avenging Robinson Hill's death. He continued to maintain his own innocence. Paulus subsequently appealed, and in October 1981, the Texas Court of Appeals reversed the conviction, ruling that there was not enough evidence to prove Paulus's guilt, and that McKittrick's evidence was unreliable. This decision was then overturned by the Texas Court of Criminal Appeals in May 1982, reinstating the conviction and the original sentence. Paulus died of breast cancer at the Gatesville prison on May 16, 1986.

== Aftermath ==
In 1979, Ash and Rhea Robinson relocated from Houston to Pensacola, Florida, to distance themselves from the ongoing interest in the death of their daughter. By 1981, Robert Hill had reconciled with his grandparents and was also living in Pensacola. Ash Robinson died in Florida in February 1985, aged 87. His wife Rhea died, aged 86, just over two years later in June 1987. Following the death of her husband, Connie Hill petitioned the court for custody of her 12-year-old stepson, Robert. She was joined in filing the petition by John Hill's mother and sister. Connie and Robert Hill lived in the Kirby Drive home for several years. Robert Hill decided to sell the house in 1981. At the time, he was living in Florida, while Connie was preparing to remarry. Ann Kurth and her three sons went into seclusion outside of Austin, Texas, where she died in January 1990, aged 59.

In November 1980, CBS-TV reported that medical evidence had been reexamined, and that Hill's defense lawyer, Richard Haynes was of the opinion that Joan Robinson Hill may have died as a result of toxic shock syndrome, a condition associated with the use of tampons. But while Houston Medical Examiner Joseph Jachimscyk agreed that some of Robinson Hill's symptoms were indicative of toxic shock syndrome, he said that others were not, so would not change his original conclusion.

== Cultural impact ==
The events surrounding the death of Joan Robinson Hill have been the subject of several books, as well as a 1981 television film. Journalist and author Thomas Thompson's 1976 book Blood and Money provides a detailed account of the case. He became interested in the story while shadowing doctors in Houston as research for a previous book, Hearts, about the world of cardiac surgery. Ann Kurth filed a $3 million lawsuit against Thompson over his description of her as a "provocatively dressed, heavily made-up woman", but her action was dismissed by a jury in Austin in March 1981, which decided that although derogatory, his description of her was accurate. The legal case was one of three Thompson faced over his book.

Kurth published her own account of the case entitled Prescription Murder in which she repeated her claim that Hill had tried to kill her, and alleged that he may have poisoned his first wife with bacteria-laced pastries. (Note: Kurth further claimed that the suicide of Hill's brother, Julian, in 1963, was actually a murder by John Hill. Kurth wrote that Hill confessed to injecting his brother with an overdose of morphine because he was embarrassed by his brother's homosexuality. The official report states that the suicide resulted from a barbiturate overdose.) She also suggested that Hill had not been killed in 1972, and had instead moved to Mexico after faking his death. (Note: While Kurth said she believed Hill was alive and living in Mexico, Thomas Thompson, the author of Blood and Money, countered her claim by saying, "She has one eye on the cash register and no eye on the truth".) Retired Harris County District Attorney Carol Vance also discussed the case in his memoirs, Boomtown DA.

In 1981, the Robinson Hill case was the subject of Murder in Texas, a television film featuring Farrah Fawcett as Robinson Hill. It concurs with Kurth's theory that Hill may have faked his death, suggesting that he arranged for someone else to be killed in his place. The journalist Jerry Buck noted in an article preceding the film's debut on NBC that the face of the shooting victim had been battered and that there were anomalies in the autopsy report, notably that Hill had a different eye color from that recorded for the dead person. Buck also wrote that Hill was in financial difficulties with the Internal Revenue Service in 1972 and facing a murder case against him. Sightings of Hill had also been reported in Mexico and New York.

The death of Robinson Hill was also the subject of a true crime television documentary-drama as part of the series Behind Mansion Walls from the Investigation Discovery television network. "The Thoroughbred Heiress" first aired in June 2011.

== See also ==
- List of unsolved deaths

== Sources cited ==
- Evans, Colin (2007). Killer Doctors. Penguin Press. ISBN 978-1-10120-597-6.
- Sizer, Mona D. (2008). Outrageous Texans: Tales of the Rich and Infamous. Taylor Trade Publications. ISBN 978-1-58979-402-3.
- Sizer, Mona D. (2000). Texas Justice, Bought and Paid For. Taylor Trade Publications. ISBN 978-1-46162-555-1.
- Thompson, Thomas (1976). Blood and Money. New English Library.
- Thompson, Thomas (2001). Blood and Money (reprint ed.). Running Press. ISBN 978-0-78670-947-2.
