= Hustler (magazine) =

American women's pornographic magazine

- Premier issue of Hustler, July 1974
- Editor: Larry Flynt
- Categories: Adult-targeted
- Publisher: Larry Flynt
- Total circulation: approximately 500,000 (2006)
- Founded: July 1974; 52 years ago
- Company: Larry Flynt Publications
- Country: United States
- Language: English, many others
- Website: hustlermagazine.com

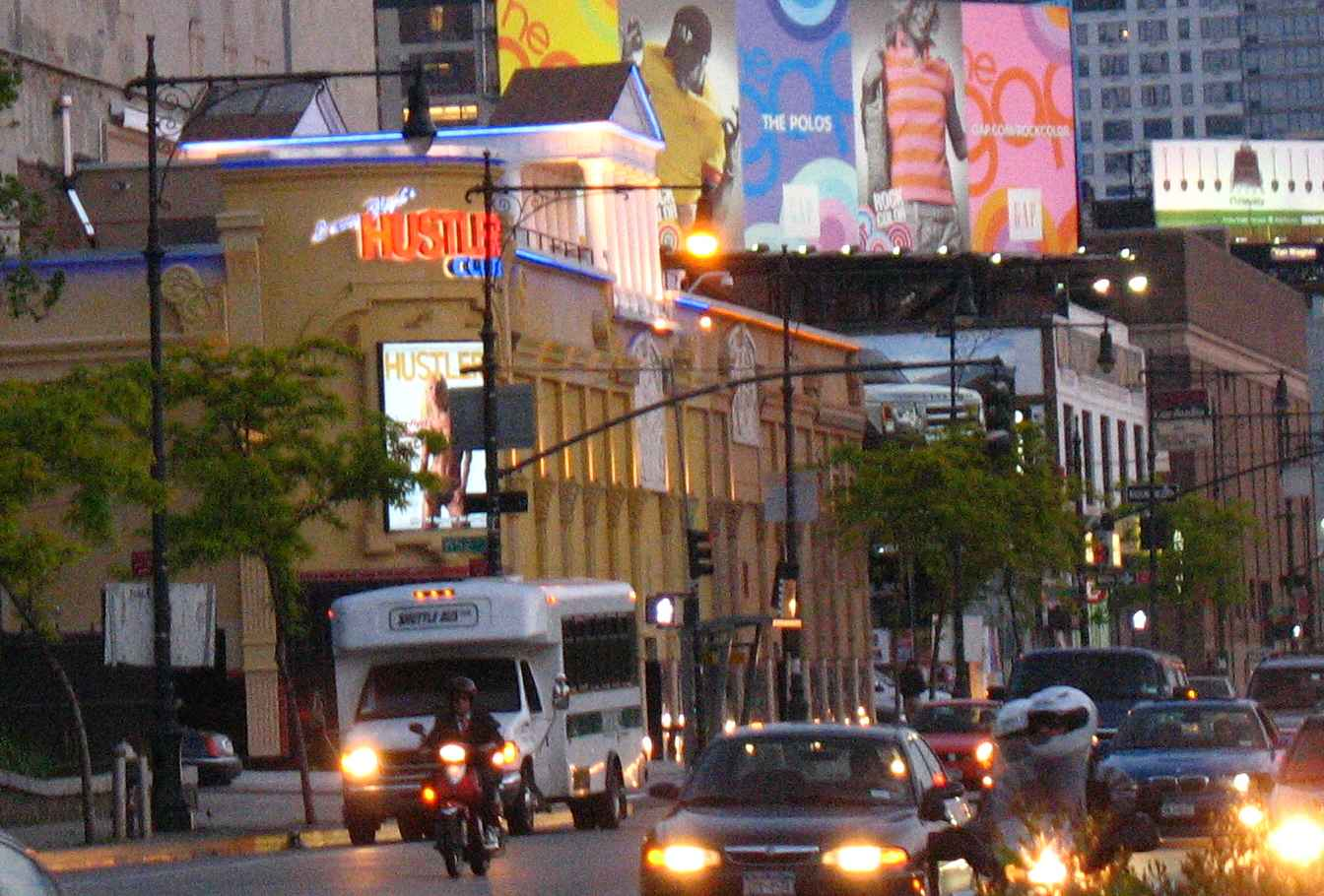
Larry Flynt Hustler Club on West 52nd Street in New York in 2006

Hustler is an American pornographic magazine published monthly by Larry Flynt Publications (LFP). Introduced in 1974, it was a step forward from the Hustler Newsletter, originally conceived by founder Larry Flynt as cheap advertising for his strip club businesses at the time. The magazine grew from an uncertain start to a peak circulation of around 3 million in the early 1980s; it has since dropped to approximately 500,000. Hustler was among the first major American-based magazines to feature graphic photos of female genitalia and simulated sex acts, in contrast with relatively modest publications such as Playboy. In the 1990s, Hustler, like several of its competitors, began featuring actual depictions of sexual penetration and oral sex.

Since its inception, Hustler has been considered more explicit (and more self-consciously lowbrow) than such well-known competitors as Playboy and Penthouse. Hustler frequently depicts hardcore themes, such as the use of sex toys, penetration, oral sex and group sex.

Larry Flynt Publications also licenses the Hustler brand to the Hustler Casino in Gardena, California, which was owned directly by Flynt as an individual through his holding company El Dorado Enterprises. Other enterprises include licensing the Hustler name to the Hustler Club chain of bars and clubs and the Hustler Hollywood store chain that sells adult-oriented videos, clothing, magazines and sex toys. The chain's flagship store, formerly located on Sunset Boulevard in West Hollywood, was torn down in 2016. Both licensed enterprises are operated by LFP's partner, Deja Vu.

== Founding ==
The business first began in Cincinnati, where Larry Flynt and his brother, Jimmy Flynt, opened up a store in 1969. Jimmy wrote the check for $5,000 to pay for the club in Cincinnati, and he was listed on the masthead for volume 1, number 1 of the magazine in July 1974. However, Larry fired his brother in 2009, after which Jimmy began developing his own business, Jimmy Flynt's Sexy Gifts Stand. An old member of Hustler magazine has described the relationship, saying, "Larry is the show, and Jimmy makes it go".

== Publisher ==
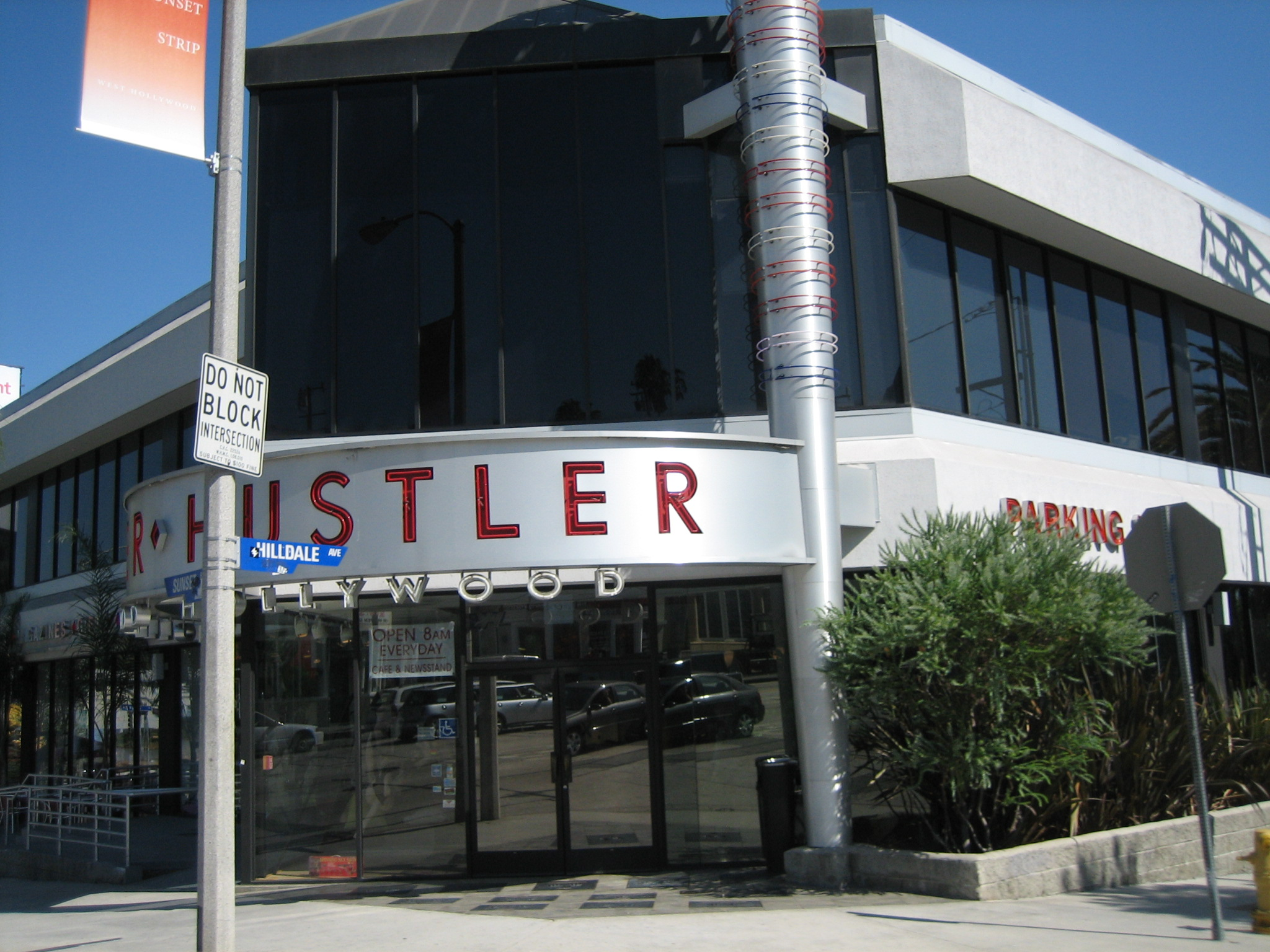
Former Hustler retail store in West Hollywood, California

Hustler is officially published by LFP, Inc, which also produces pornographic films. The abbreviation "L.F.P." originally stood for "Larry Flynt Publications."

A Canadian version of Hustler is published by a Quebec-based firm. This magazine is not owned by Larry Flynt but is licensed to publish material from the American version. In general, Canadian Hustler imitates the appearance and tone of its American counterpart, with Canadian content added. In 1999, the magazine created a minor controversy in Canada by inviting readers to submit sexually explicit stories about Sheila Copps, a left-leaning member of the Liberal cabinet. There have also been Australian, British and South African versions of the magazine.

During a bookstore signing in July 2011, Flynt stated that less than five percent of his income comes from the print magazine; he also speculated that the print magazine would not be around in two to three years.

== Regular features ==
One feature of Hustler is the "Asshole of the Month" column. In every monthly issue of the magazine, a public figure is selected for severe criticism as that month's "asshole". An illustration depicting the criticized person's head emerging from the anus of a cartoon donkey is shown alongside the article. After Flynt's imprisonment in 1977 and his alleged conversion to evangelical Christianity, he promised to reform "Asshole of the Month". However, as of 2024, reform in the feature has yet to be seen.

The centerfold pictorial is the "Hustler Honey". Occasionally the models are pornographic actresses appearing under a pseudonym; in the mid-80's, actresses and strippers appeared under their more familiar names.

List of Hustler Honeys by Month
Year	Month	Model	Comments
1974	July	Marida Lindbloom	
1974	August	Reverie	
1974	September	Cindy	
1974	October	Diana	(from Columbus Hustler Club)
1974	November	Lorraine	Pseudonym for adult model Lorraine McKinney
1974	December	Patti	
1975	January	Olinka	
1975	February	Marcia	(from Columbus Hustler Club)
1975	March	Michelle	(French, shaved)
1975	April	Lolita	
1975	May	Ginger	Pseudonym for adult actress Serena
1975	June	Bonita	
1975	July	Althea Leasure	(Flynt fiancée)
1975	August	Marilyn	
1975	September	Kathy Keeton	(This was in reference to Penthouse publisher Kathy Keeton, who later sued Hustler and Flynt for defamation, due in part to using her name to identify the model.)
1975	October	Heather	
1975	November	Amber	Pseudonym for adult actress Amber Hunt
1975	December	S'Lena	
1976	January	Donna	
1976	February	Renee	
1976	March	Jennifer	Pseudonym for adult actress Gina Janssen
1976	April	Max	
1976	May	Jocelyn	(from Columbus office)
1976	June	Pat	
1976	July	Evelyn	
1976	August	Tina	
1976	September	Polly	
1976	October	Leslie Bovee	
1976	November	Sheila	(56yo Columbus divorcee)
1976	December	Candy Clark	
1977	January	Karyn Wagner	
1977	February	Annie	
1977	March	Maggie	
1977	April	Allison	
1977	May	Nicole	
1977	June	Suze Randall	
1977	July	Monica Chapa	
1977	August	Stacy	(With scratch 'n' sniff feature)
1977	September	Tina	
1977	October	Cassie	
1977	November	Sheree Lee	
1977	December	Lydia	
1978	January	Chrissy	Pseudonym for adult model Mariah Clark
1978	February	Beverly Kaszycki	First Beaver Hunt winner
1978	March	Angel	
1978	April	Janet and Karen	
1978	May	Arlene	
1978	June	Rebecca	
1978	July	N/A	("Seat of Passion" love chair)
1978	August	N/A	("Parlor Games" spread)
1978	September	N/A	("Hit and Run" spread)
1978	October	N/A	("Hard Day's Work" spread)
1978	November	Sheila	
1978	December	Kari	Pseudonym for model Kari Klark, aka Kari Burton aka Cameron Norton
1979	January	Dana	
1979	February	Michele	
1979	March	Pandora	
1979	April		Saturday Afternoon Fever g/g spread)
1979	May	Pamela	
1979	June	Becky	Pseudonym for model Rebecca Hart
1979	July	Cindy	
1979	August	Michelle	
1979	September	Wanda	Pseudonym for adult model Carolyn Burch aka Debbie Gordon
1979	October	Inga	
1979	November	Debbie	
1979	December	Debi	Former Hustler talent coordinator
1980	January	Toni	
1980	February	Celeste	
1980	March	Sandy and Syndi	
1980	April	Paula	Pseudonym for adult model and actress Sylvia Wright
1980	May	Madeleine Kelly	Beaver Hunt winner
1980	June	Alicia	Pseudonym for adult model Sharon Sorrentino
1980	July	Cissy	Pseudonym for Susanne Britton aka Barbara Peckinpaugh
1980	August	Dusty	
1980	September	Miranda	
1980	October	Pamela	
1980	November	Dawn	
1980	December	Tipi	Pseudonym for Tipi Rocks
1981	January	Jennifer	
1981	February	Dixie	
1981	March	Amber	
1981	April	Marlene	
1981	May	Tanya	
1981	June	Rachel	
1981	July	Monique	
1981	August	Robin	
1981	September	Eileen	
1981	October	Cheryl	
1981	November	Samantha	
1981	December	Inga	
1982	January	Angel	
1982	February	Nora	
1982	March	Julia	
1982	April	Kate	
1982	May	Charlene	
1982	June	Holly	
1982	July	Lynn	
1982	August	Lulu	obese model
1982	September	Trina	Three-breasted model
1982	October	Shirley	
1982	November	Jessica	
1982	December	Marlene	Pregnant model
1983	January	Eve	
1983	February	Darby	
1983	March	Elizabeth	
1983	April	Jeanette	
1983	May	Catherine	
1983	June	Cyndi	
1983	July	Alexandra Day	
1983	August	Lynn	
1983	September	Nikki	
1983	October	Madilyn	
1983	November	Ashley	
1983	December	Bernadette	
1984	January	Isabella	
1984	February	Sandi	
1984	March	Karina	
1984	April	Anita	
1984	May		(Biblical spread)
1984	June	Camilla	
1984	July	Hillary	
1984	August	Lorelei	
1984	September	Sammi-Jo	
1984	October	Ron Jeremy and co-star	
1984	November	Helene	
1984	December		10 year retrospective
1985	January	Roxanne	
1985	February	Lucille	
1985	March	Loretta	
1985	April	Shayla	
1985	May	Tara	
1985	June	Helga	
1985	July	Melody	
1985	August	Heidi	
1985	September	Megan	
1985	October	Carolyn	
1985	November	Irina	
1985	December	Michelle	
1986	January	Cheri	
1986	February	Traci Lords	
1986	March	Sandy	
1986	April	Tanya	
1986	May	Muffy	
1986	June	Veronica	
1986	July	Jeanette Littledove	
1986	August	Stormy	
1986	September	Jacqueline	
1986	October	Nicole	
1986	November	Kate	
1986	December	Elle Rio	
1987	January	Blondi Bee	
1987	February	Cha Cha	
1987	March	Penny Morgan	
1987	April	Jessica Jensen	Miss Nude Universe
1987	May	Caroline	
1987	June	Roseanne	
1987	July	Melina	
1987	August	Sally	
1987	September	Barbara Dare	
1987	October	Cori	
1987	November	Venus Delight	
1987	December	Candice Starrek	Canadian stripper
1988	January	Sylvie	
1988	February	Regina	
1988	March	Angela Baron	
1988	April	Mona	
1988	May	Coco	
1988	June	Nicole	
1988	July	Jay	
1988	August	Dana Lynn	
1988	September	Miki	
1988	October	Sara	
1988	November	Candide	
1988	December	Nikki Knights	
1989	January	Tonya	
1989	February	Linda	
1989	March	Sunny	Canadian stripper
1989	April	Toppsy Curvey	
1989	May	Julianne James	
1989	June	Olga	
1989	July	Candice	
1989	August	Diana	Same model as Tracey in 9/91 issue
1989	September	Marisa	
1989	October	Clare	
1989	November	Kascha	
1989	December	Christy Canyon	
1990	January	Veronica Dol	
1990	February	Deidre Holland	
1990	March	Sally	
1990	April	Amber Lynn	
1990	May	Bobbi & Talitha	
1990	June	Alicia	
1990	July	Ericka	
1990	August	Shari	
1990	September	Clair	
1990	October	Billie	
1990	November	Tina	
1990	December	Gina	Pseudonym for adult model Mikki Brenner
1991	January	Angela	
1991	February	Berenice and Margret	Ashley Lauren and unknown model
1991	March	Savannah Wilsey	
1991	April	Jane	
1991	May	Danielle Rogers	
1991	June	Naomi	
1991	July	Delilah	
1991	August	Melina	
1991	September	Tracey	Same model as Diana in 8/89 issue
1991	October	Maggie	
1991	November	Jeanna Fine	
1991	December	Lita	
1991	Holiday Issue	Amber Lynn	
1992	January	Marlene	Diane van Laar
1992	February	Janey	
1992	March	Alicia	
1992	April	Anita	Tanya Rivers
1992	May	Renee	
1992	June	Pauline	
1992	July	Anita	
1992	August	Melissa	
1992	September	Dallas	
1992	October	Lacy	
1992	November	Barbara	Wendy Moore
1992	December	Alex	Pseudonym for adult model Alexis Christian
1992	Holiday Issue	Danielle Rogers	
1993	January	Madison	
1993	February	Angelica Bella	
1993	March	Priscilla	
1993	April	Reba	
1993	May	Sandrine	
1993	June	Roberta	
1993	July	Shayla	
1993	August	Rae	
1993	September	Tabitha	(With scratch 'n' sniff feature)
1993	October	Shannon	
1993	November	Christine	
1993	December	Kizzy	
1993	Holiday Issue	Alex	Alexis Christian
1994	January	Estee	Julia Ann
1994	February	Sharen	
1994	March	Patsy	Sammi Jessop
1994	April	Celeste	Adult film star Celeste
1994	May	Charlee	
1994	June	Daron	
1994	July	Charmaine Sinclair	
1994	August	Chasey	
1994	September	Draghixa	Draghixa Laurent
1994	October	Chase	
1994	November	Jenna Jameson	
1994	December	Brandy	
1994	Holiday Issue	Gitana	
1995	January	Rebecca	
1995	February	Jessica L'Amour	
1995	March	Mia	
1995	April	Lisa	
1995	May	Zenah	
1995	June	Ashley	
1995	July	Paulina	Regina Hall
1995	August	Laura & Janine	Taylor St. Claire and Renee
1995	September	Jessica	
1995	October	Taylor	
1995	November	Anna Romeo	
1995	December	Renee	
1995	Holiday Issue	Corky	

Hustler ran the comic strip feature "Honey Hooker" from 1975 on. With each installment, Honey would have graphic sexual encounters with any male (or female) she ran across. She might be in American colonial times one month and in a Super Bowl locker room the next. This feature was designed to compete against Little Annie Fanny in Playboy and Wicked Wanda in Penthouse. Unlike Fanny and Wanda, Honey Hooker was explicitly portrayed as being a prostitute, keeping with the seamier and less romantic aspects of sexuality in Hustler.

The Beaver Hunt section of the magazine contains explicit nudes of amateur models submitted by readers.

Another Hustler feature that was heavily criticized was the Chester the Molester comic strip. Each month's issue depicted Chester, a cartoon middle-aged pedophile, joyfully raping or molesting young girls. After increasing criticism, the cartoon became Chester and Hester, Hester as an unattractive middle-aged woman who was Chester's partner. Following Flynt's alleged religious conversion, he introduced Chester the Protector, a reincarnation of Chester who served to protect young girls from rape and seduction.

The regular feature "Ads We'd Like to See" recreates advertisements of everyday products in a sexualized or violent way. For example, an advertisement in the 1980 issue called 'Doer's Lite Label', a parody of Dewar's Lite Label Whiskey, featured Kenneth Bianchi, the Hillside Strangler. Listed as his greatest accomplishment was Cindy Lee Hudspeth, whom he actually raped and murdered in 1978. He is quoted as saying "You gotta treat 'em rough…". This section was highly criticized for admiring men who had committed sexualized crimes against women.

In addition to its regular features, Hustler occasionally published special features and issues. Examples include the "All Meat" issue from 1978, in which the cover spread depicted a naked woman being fed into a meat grinder upside down. In 1977, the magazine's front page read "First-Time Ever Scratch 'N' Sniff Centerfold".

== Controversy and criticism ==
In 1984, conservative academic Judith Reisman received a grant from the Department of Justice to complete a study at American University concerning the cartoons of Playboy, Penthouse, and Hustler, specifically the sexual depictions of minors in these cartoons. She finished the study in 1986 and found that, on average, the number of times per issue that Hustler referred to children, crime, and violence was 46.

Reisman published a nearly 1,600-page report of her findings condemning the sexual depictions of children in pornographic magazines, but her work was met with criticism from her peers. An American University professor, Myra Sadker, said that she was "very dismayed about the quality of office management and the nature of the research that was going on." Many fellow academics have disputed the neutrality of the research. Avedon Carol, a sex crime researcher and author, said that Reisman's study was a "scientific disaster, riddled with researcher bias."

Hustler's chief cartoon artist Dwaine Tinsley was arrested on 18 May 1989, after being accused by his 18-year-old daughter Allison of molesting her since she was thirteen years old. According to court records, he allegedly told his coworkers, "You can't write about this stuff all the time if you don't experience it." Tinsley was found guilty of five counts of child molestation and sentenced to six years in prison although he only spent 23 months behind bars. Tinsley was the artist behind the magazine's regular Chester the Molester series, which was printed in the magazine from 1976 to 1989.

In a 2012 issue of Hustler, S. E. Cupp, a conservative commentator, was photoshopped and depicted as explicitly performing oral sex. The article describes Cupp as a "lovely young lady who read too much Ayn Rand in high school and ended up joining the dark side... But her hotness is diminished when she espouses dumb ideas like defunding Planned Parenthood." Despite having a disclaimer that the photo was not real, the photograph horrified Cupp, knowing that "this photo will be out there forever." Flynt's response was that the photoshopped image was meant to be satirical: "I'm able to publish this because of the Supreme Court case I won in 1984, Flynt V. Falwell." Cupp did not pursue either Flynt or the magazine because of "free speech". Cupp ultimately chose to "express a little gratitude for Hustler," saying: "I'm completely serious here—there is an accompanying sidebar to this story, in which they lay out why they did this to me. It's under a hundred words, and in that paragraph they say, 'S.E. Cupp, she's lovely, she's smart, she's fine, but she happens to be a crazy conservative who is pro-life and wants to defund Planned Parenthood. And for that, she deserves a phallus in her mouth.' That is essentially what they're saying, and I have to commend that as being incredibly honest."

== Lawsuits and litigation ==
The magazine has had many lawsuits since the 1980s, including claims of defamation and enforcement of sexual violence and behavior. However, there have not been any lawsuits against the magazine or incorporation as of 2016.

In Douglass v. Hustler Magazine Inc. 769 F.2d 1128 (1985), actress Robyn Douglass sued Hustler for defamation and unlawfully placing her under a false light. Douglass posed nude for freelance photographer Augustin Gregory, believing that her photos would appear in an issue of Playboy Magazine. However, Gregory was hired to Hustler and Douglass's photos were published in the 1981 January issue without Douglass's consent. She brought the case to the United States District Court from the North District of Illinois on the basis that the magazine had defamed her name and likeness. The court cases ended in favoring Douglass since the magazine had violated her right of publicity, awarding her $600,000.

In Keeton v. Hustler Magazine, Inc., 465 U.S. 770 (1984) United States supreme court case, Kathy Keeton, vice chairman of Penthouse, sued Hustler for defamation. Keeton brought the case to New Hampshire due its generous six-year statute of limitations for libel and the state believed it was able to support taking jurisdiction due to the magazine's content. The magazine sold up to 15,000 issues since 1975, containing a cartoon where Keeton had received a venereal disease from Robert Guccione, a publisher of Penthouse. Keeton was awarded $2 million for the defamation damages.

At some point between 1974 and 1983, Hustler began mailing the latest issue of the magazine, uninvited and for free, to all of the offices of Members of the United States Congress. Attempts to block the monthly mailings proved unsuccessful after a court ruled in Hustler's favor in United States Postal Service v. Hustler Magazine, Inc. (1986), contending that the publishers had the right to mail the magazine, as the defendants did not "threaten the unique privacy interests that attach in the home." The practice continues as of April 2014.

Hustler Magazine, Inc. v. Falwell, 485 U.S. 46 (1988), is a United States Supreme Court case in which the Court held that the First and Fourteenth Amendments prohibit public figures from recovering damages for the tort of intentional infliction of emotional distress (IIED), if the emotional distress was caused by a caricature, parody, or satire of the public figure that a reasonable person would not have interpreted as factual.

In Herceg v. Hustler 484 U.S. 811 (1989), a family attempted to sue Hustler for the suicide of their fourteen-year-old boy on the basis that its illustrations stimulated violence. Within the magazine's contents was the article "Orgasm of Death", demonstrating practices of erotic asphyxia via photographs in order to heighten sexual pleasure in men. However, Hustler placed disclaimers on the photographs of "Do Not Attempt" to prevent the audience from mimicking the photos. The court case ended in favoring the magazine; the court agreed that the depictions were not forcing readers to perform these erotic or dangerous activities.

== Other venture ==
=== Related magazines ===
LFP, Inc. publishes several other magazines that use the Hustler brand:

- Hustler's Taboo, specializing in fetishistic material, such as the depiction of sexual bondage and urolagnia
- Barely Legal, a primarily softcore magazine focusing on models between 18 and 23
- Asian Fever, focusing on Asian models
- Hustler XXX, a more generic hardcore offering
- Chic, an upscale gentleman's magazine featuring nude layouts with lifestyle articles

=== Websites ===
In 1995, the company launched Hustler.com. Larry Flynt Productions operates Hustler.com and a number of related sites wherein it sells pictures and videos with content similar to that in its magazines. The site was targeted by Anonymous in Operation Payback in October 2010.

== Industry awards ==
=== Erotic Movie Awards ===
During the Golden Age of Porn, and prior to getting into the movie business themselves, Hustler was one of two magazines that announced awards for adult sex films, the other being Adam Film World. They were discontinued in the late 1980s.

The awards were based on fan ballots printed in the publication. In announcing its third annual awards, the magazine said, "Hustler's erotic-movie awards are intended to reward excellence in the erotic-film industry and thereby encourage the fast-buck makers of mediocrity to clean up their act or go out of business."

- 1979 (3rd annual) recipients: Best Film – Sex World, Best Actress – Sharon Thorpe in Sex World, Best Actor – John Leslie in Sensual Encounters of Every Kind, Best Director – Anthony Spinelli for Sex World, Best Sex Scene – Harry Reems and Maria Lynn in Butterflies, Most Accomplished Fellatio Artist – Carol Connors in The Erotic Adventures of Candy, Most Accomplished Cunnilinguist – John Leslie in The Other Side of Julie
- 1983 (7th annual) recipients: Best Film – The Dancers, Best Actress – Annette Haven in Peaches and Cream, Best Actor – John Leslie in Nothing To Hide, Best Director – Anthony Spinelli for The Dancers, Best Sex Scene – Jamie Gillis and Veronica Hart in Wanda Whips Wall Street, Most Accomplished Fellatio Artist – Annie Sprinkle in Deep Inside Annie Sprinkle, Most Accomplished Cunnilinguist – Annette Haven in Peaches and Cream
- 1986 (10th annual) recipients: Best Film – New Wave Hookers, Best Actress – Colleen Brennan in Trinity Brown, Best Actor – Jerry Butler in Snake Eyes, Best Director – Gregory Dark for New Wave Hookers, Best Sex Scene – Traci Lords and Tom Byron in Sister Dearest, Most Accomplished Fellatio Artist – Ginger Lynn in Bedtime Tales, Most Accomplished Cunnilinguist – Danielle in Hostage Girls, Most Disappointing Film – Debbie Does Dallas III

=== Porn Block of Fame ===
Hustler created the Porn Block of Fame, similar to the Hollywood Walk of Fame, in 1998. It is located outside their flagship store, formerly in West Hollywood and now in Hollywood, California.

== See also ==
- List of men's magazines
- List of pornographic magazines
