= Richard Haynes (lawyer) =

American lawyer (1927–2017)

Haynes in 1970

Richard "Racehorse" Haynes (April 3, 1927 – April 28, 2017) was a Texas criminal defense attorney. He became a star of the legal world after prevailing in a series of seemingly impossible murder trials in Texas in the 1970s and 1980s. Time magazine named him one of the top defense attorneys in the nation.

== Law practice ==
A native of Houston, Texas, Haynes graduated from the University of Houston Law Center in 1956, and was admitted to the State Bar of Texas on April 23, 1956. During one stretch, he reportedly won 163 drunk-driving cases in a row. He was involved in landmark cases such as The State of Texas v. John Hill (a basis for journalist and author Thomas Thompson's 1976 book Blood and Money), and the notorious T. Cullen Davis murder and later solicitation of murder trials in Fort Worth, Texas, both of which ended in acquittals. He also represented Morganna, a.k.a. "The Kissing Bandit", and Vicki Daniel, who was the wife of Price Daniel Jr. His successful defense of Vicki Daniel established battered woman syndrome as a legal defense in the state of Texas.

Haynes said the secret to his legal advocacy was to have the answer to any prospective question from a judge or prosecutor or if an answer wasn't at the ready, be prepared to change the subject. At an American Bar Association seminar in New York in the late 1970s, Haynes explained how to plead in the alternative: "Say you sue me because you claim my dog bit you. Well now, this is my defense: My dog doesn't bite. And second, in the alternative, my dog was tied up that night. And third, I don't believe you really got bit. And fourth, I don't have a dog."

When he first began practicing law, Haynes would sometimes ask his clients to thank the judge and jury after their acquittal. He ended the practice after one client said, "Ladies and gentlemen, I want to thank each and every one of you. And I promise you that I will never, ever do it again."

Haynes once cross-examined an empty chair when the prosecution failed to call a key witness. His courtroom theatrics included shocking himself with a cattle prod to make a point. In defending a biker gang that had nailed a woman to a tree, Haynes planned to drive a nail into his hand to show the jury it wasn't that painful, but changed his mind at the last second. Such flamboyant tactics comprised a small part of Haynes' legal strategy, however. As journalist Gary Cartwright declared: "[Trials] are won through careful attention to detail and by hard scientific analysis of situations and evidence. Haynes prepares himself for a case by cramming down books and articles on criminology, pathology, ballistics, psychology, crime-scene investigative technique, whatever is called in for a particular case."

== Military record ==
Haynes served in the United States Marine Corps during World War II. During the Battle of Iwo Jima, Haynes was awarded the Navy and Marine Corps Medal for pulling two wounded and drowning Marines from the water after their landing craft overturned.

After receiving an accounting degree from the University of Houston in 1951, he was drafted back into military service, serving in the United States Army as a paratrooper and hand-to-hand combat instructor with the 11th Airborne Division during the Korean War.

== Personal life ==
Haynes was born in Houston, where he later established his law practice. His father was a plasterer who struggled financially, so at the age of two Haynes was sent to San Antonio to live with his grandmother, where he stayed until he was eight years old.

At 5'7" in height, Haynes was an excellent boxer. He was the Texas amateur welterweight champion in the 1940s.

A football coach gave Haynes the nickname "Racehorse". The coach said Haynes couldn't carry the ball through the opposing team's line but ran toward the sideline "like a racehorse".

In 1979, he received the Golden Plate Award of the American Academy of Achievement.

Haynes died on April 28, 2017, in Livingston, Texas.

== In books and movies ==
G.W. Bailey appeared as Haynes in the 1981 film Murder in Texas, which is based in the events arising from the death of Joan Robinson Hill. Dennis Franz appeared as Haynes in the 1995 film Texas Justice, which is based on the book Blood Will Tell by Gary Cartwright. One of the tracks on Tom Russell's 2003 album Modern Art, simply entitled Racehorse Haynes, deals with his career.
