= Lulu Devine =

American actress

- Born: Cynthia Stathopoulos; November 17, 1955 (age 70); Boston, Massachusetts, US
- Other name: Lulu Divine
- Occupations: Big-bust feature dancer; model; pornographic video actress
- Modeling information
- Height: 5 ft 4 in (1.63 m)
- Hair color: Blonde, Brown
- Eye color: Light Brown
- Website: luludevine.com

Lulu Devine (born Cynthia Stathopoulos; November 17, 1955) is a former American big-bust feature dancer, model, and pornographic video actress. Lulu turned to dance as a feature dancer during the late 1980s, and by 1990 began a pornographic video career. Lulu is also the older sister of fellow big-bust feature dancer and porn actress Toppsy Curvey.

== Talk show, magazine appearances ==
Lulu has appeared on numerous talk shows, such as (Jerry Springer Show, The Jenny Jones Show), The Howard Stern Show, and The Sally Jessy Raphael Show and also has made appearances at the Adult Entertainment Expo with fellow big-bust performers Chelsea Charms, Minka, and Kayla Kleevage. Devine has appeared in men's magazines such as Score, Gent, Hustler's Busty Beauties, and D-Cup Magazine.

== "Bandito" sports game crashing runs ==
Devine is the older sister of fellow big-bust feature entertainer and adult model Toppsy Curvey. In the Tampa area, Lulu is also notoriously recognized in local pro sports circles for her "Kissing Bandit" routine, made famous by former "Kissing Bandit", TV personality, big-bust model and three-time Playboy centerfold Morganna Roberts. Numerous times in the past she has accompanied her sister Toppsey on her "bandito" runs, as to where she and her sister Lulu would run out on the fields during Tampa Bay Rays baseball and Tampa Bay Buccaneers pro football games and kiss the players.

== Police charges ==
In early 2005, Hillsborough County, Florida sheriff's deputies raided her Brandon house and arrested her on a misdemeanor charge of prostitution. She was later convicted and fined, then released. The story gained national attention and was shown on various television news media affiliate broadcasts, as well as tabloid journalism sources.
