= Toppsy Curvey =

American adult model and stripper

- Other names: Topsy Curvey; Topsey Curvey
- Occupations: Big-bust feature dancer; pornographic video actress
- Modeling information
- Hair color: Blonde
- Eye color: Light Brown

Toppsy Curvey is a former big-bust feature dancer and pornographic video actress in the United States. She was a feature dancer in the late 1980s and by 1994 she began a brief soft-core pornographic video career. She is also the younger sister of fellow big-bust feature dancer and one-time porn actress Lulu Devine.

== Television appearances ==
Curvey has made appearances on talk shows such as The Jerry Springer Show, The Jenny Jones Show and The Sally Jessy Raphael Show. She was once hired as a spokesmodel for the Howard Stern Show but walked off after engaging in a verbal battle with comedian Judy Tenuta. She has also appeared in such men's magazines as Score, Gent, Hustler's Busty Beauties, and D-Cup Magazine.

== "Bandito" sports game crashing runs ==
In the Tampa area, Curvey's sister Lulu is known in local sports circles for her "Kissing Bandit" routine, made famous by former "Kissing Bandit", TV personality, big-bust model and three-time Playboy centerfold Morganna Roberts. Toppsy accompanied her sister numerous times on "bandito" runs, as she and her sister Lulu ran out on the fields during Tampa Bay Rays of Major League Baseball and Tampa Bay Buccaneers of the NFL to kiss players.

On July 28, 1991, Curvey planted a kiss on pitcher Scott Kamieniecki at Yankee Stadium. In August 1991, at a Mets game, she visited pitcher David Cone on the mound during the second inning. This event not only made news, but was also included in Sports and Courts by Frederick J. Day and You Be the Umpire! The Baseball Controversy Quiz Book by Richard Goldstein. Both these publications stated Curvey's name as Laurie Stathopoulos. However, after kissing pitcher Nolan Ryan in October 1991, the Los Angeles Times reported that Curvey gave her name as Kathy Stathopoulous.
