= Keeton v. Hustler Magazine, Inc. =

Keeton v. Hustler Magazine
- Supreme Court of the United States

Argued November 8, 1983 Decided March 20, 1984
- Full case name: Kathy Keeton v. Hustler Magazine, Inc.
- Citations: 465 U.S. 770 (more) 104 S. Ct. 1473; 79 L. Ed. 2d 790; 1984 U.S. LEXIS 40

Case history
- Prior: 682 F.2d 33 (1st Cir. 1982); cert. granted, 459 U.S. 1169 (1983).

Holding
- A state's courts could assert personal jurisdiction over the publisher of a defamatory article, where the publisher circulated the publication in the state where the case was brought, regardless of the plaintiff's home state.

Court membership
- Chief Justice Warren E. Burger Associate Justices William J. Brennan Jr. · Byron White; Thurgood Marshall · Harry Blackmun; Lewis F. Powell Jr. · William Rehnquist; John P. Stevens · Sandra Day O'Connor

Case opinions
- Majority: Rehnquist, joined by Burger, White, Marshall, Blackmun, Powell, Stevens, O’Connor
- Concurrence: Brennan (in judgment)

Laws applied
- U.S. Const. amend. XIV

Keeton v. Hustler Magazine, Inc., 465 U.S. 770 (1984), was a case in which the United States Supreme Court held that a state could assert personal jurisdiction over the publisher of a national magazine which published an allegedly defamatory article about a resident of another state, and where the magazine had wide circulation in that state.

== Background ==
Keeton was a case for defamation brought by Kathy Keeton, a New York resident and publisher of Penthouse magazine, against the nationally distributed Hustler magazine.

The plaintiff claimed that she was libeled by material published in magazine since 1975, including a cartoon that falsely suggested she had contracted a sexually transmitted infection from fellow Penthouse publisher (and her later to be husband) Bob Guccione, as well as a nude pictorial spread of a model who was identified as Keeton. Keeton chose to bring the case in New Hampshire, even though the plaintiff was not a resident there, because New Hampshire allowed six years to bring suit under that state's statute of limitations, which is longer than any other state. Also, New Hampshire's "Single Publication Rule" could increase the amount of damages the plaintiff could collect by accounting for publication in all 50 states.

The Court of Appeals for the First Circuit affirmed the lower court's dismissal of the complaint, finding that Keeton's contacts with New Hampshire were too attenuated for asserting personal jurisdiction over Hustler. The Court of Appeals also found unfair the application of New Hampshire's "Single Publication Rule" allowing Keeton damages caused in all states, should she prevail, since most of Keeton's alleged injuries occurred outside of New Hampshire.

== Issue ==
The issue was whether the federal court had personal jurisdiction if the case was brought in New Hampshire, by a plaintiff from a foreign state against a nationally circulated magazine.

== Opinion of the Court ==
In a majority opinion delivered by Justice Rehnquist on March 20, 1984, the U.S. Supreme Court upheld personal jurisdiction, stating that the plaintiff in a case had never been required to have "minimum contacts" in a state to bring suit in that state and since the magazine did conduct business within the state of New Hampshire. The Court also held that even though most of the harm done to Keeton occurred outside New Hampshire, the same would be true in most libel cases brought anywhere other than plaintiff's state of domicile.

Justice Brennan concurred in the judgment.

== Other developments ==
Keeton was later awarded a $2 million judgment by a New Hampshire jury.

This case was decided at the same time as Calder v. Jones, which held that a state had personal jurisdiction over author or editor of an article published in a magazine widely circulated in the state the case was brought, if the claim brought was that the article was libelous about activities in the state by a resident of state. Like Keeton, Rehnquist authored a unanimous decision there. However, key differences between the cases were that Calder involved a plaintiff suing in her state of residence and she was suing the author and editor involved in the piece in addition to the newspaper itself, while Keeton involved a plaintiff suing only the magazine itself.

== See also ==
- Mavrix Photo, Inc. v. Brand Technologies, Inc.
- List of United States Supreme Court cases, volume 465
