= Nikki Knights =

American pornographic actress

- Born: February 21, 1963 (age 63); United States
- Other names: Nikki Knight; Nikki Night; Jodi Dee; Stella Virgin
- Occupation: Pornographic film actress
- Height: 5 ft 3 in (1.60 m)
- Spouse: Billy Dee

Nikki Knights (born February 21, 1963) is an American pornographic film actress.

== Personal and professional life ==
Knights began her career in the adult film industry in the 1980s and worked frequently with adult film actress Jamie Summers.

She was previously married to adult film actor Billy Dee. Knights worked with Dee in adult films.

Knights was featured on the covers of the December 1988 issue of Hustler magazine and The Very Best Of High Society.

== Selected filmography ==
- Friday the 13th: A Nude Beginning (1987)
- Girl World (1987)
- Army Brat (1987)
- Brat on the Run (1987)
- Captain Hooker & Peter Porn (1987)
- Jamie Loves Jeff (1988)
- Hitler Sucks (1988)
- Hot Numbers (1988)
- Bringing Up Brat (1990)
