= The Death of Richie =

- 2007 Synergy Entertainment Release DVD Cover
- Genre: Drama
- Based on: Richie by Thomas Thompson
- Written by: John McGreevey
- Directed by: Paul Wendkos
- Starring: Robby Benson; Ben Gazzara; Eileen Brennan; Lance Kerwin
- Music by: Fred Karlin
- Country of origin: United States
- Original language: English

Production
- Executive producer: Charles B. Fitzsimons
- Producer: Michael Jaffe
- Cinematography: Robert B. Hauser
- Editor: Michael Economou
- Running time: 97 minutes
- Production company: Henry Jaffe Enterprises

Original release
- Network: NBC
- Release: January 10, 1977

The Death of Richie is a 1977 American made-for-television drama film based on Richie, a non-fiction book by Thomas Thompson about the 1972 death of George Richard "Richie" Diener Jr. at the hands of his father, who was ultimately not charged with the shooting death of his son. The film premiered on NBC on January 10, 1977.

== Plot ==
The film opens with a scene of a burial in a large suburban cemetery. Mourners, many of them young people, surround a casket while a eulogist speaks. An older couple dressed in black is closest to the casket, suggesting that they are the deceased's parents. The grief-stricken father weeps openly and his wife comforts him.

The story then cuts from the cemetery to a car swerving erratically on a street. Inside is 17-year-old Richie Werner (Robby Benson), who is doing drugs in the car with his three friends. The driver, Brick, is pulled over for his erratic driving. The police officer says he's willing to let Brick off the hook as a favor, but expects favors in return from Brick, who agrees.

This is the beginning of a series of episodes that bring Richie into conflict with his father George (Ben Gazzara), a stern man who loves his son, but has trouble expressing his feelings. Eileen Brennan plays Richie's loving but ineffectual mother Carol, and Lance Kerwin plays his younger brother Russell, of whom Richie is very protective despite his own demons.

Father and son make genuine attempts to meet each other halfway and see some success. Richie gets a job, although he loses it later when Brick and his thugs show up there. George even helps Richie get closer to Sheila (Cynthia Eilbacher), a girl from school that he likes. But the father-son relationship worsens as social pressures and personal feelings drive Richie deeper into his drug addiction; as his drug abuse escalates, they have increasingly violent confrontations. Family counseling is offered, but George refuses to participate.

The movie's climax comes when George intervenes by informing the police of his son's activities in a desperate attempt to save his life. Richie confronts his father in a drug-induced rage (from ingestion of what is referred to as "reds," usually slang for barbiturates), threatening him with an awl. George retreats to the basement in the family's home, where Richie follows him. George retrieves a revolver from his toolbox and aims it at Richie, but does not fire it, cocking the hammer back in an attempt to convince his son that he is not bluffing. Richie screams repeatedly for his father to shoot him. George manages to overpower Richie by knocking the awl from his hand, but Richie retreats upstairs and returns to the basement with a pair of scissors and taunts his father over and over again, daring him to shoot him, approaching him closer, thinking that George doesn't have the nerve to do it.

With a steady hand, George pulls the trigger. A blinding flash from the gun's barrel then morphs into a bouquet of flowers on a mahogany casket in the cemetery from the beginning, rejoining the service. Following Psalm 23, Sheila reads a brief eulogy:

To us you will exist in the flowers, in the trees, and in all the things of nature that God has given us. Richie, you are now in a world of peace and happiness forever. Pray for us as we pray for you. And somewhere, sometime, we will join you. With love from all your friends.

The movie ends with a brief written epilogue over a still shot of George placing a rose on Richie's casket, stating that a grand jury voted unanimously not to indict George Werner for the shooting death of his son, and that he lives as a free man.

== Additional information ==
- Though the shooting scene was kept short in order to meet the more restrictive censorship limits of NBC at the time, a brief scream is heard from Richie after the gunshot. This would be edited out in future airings of the movie. The aural intensity of the gunshot was also toned down in subsequent re-runs.
- The alternative title of the movie is Richie, the title of the book by Thomas Thompson on which the movie is based.
- The family's real surname is Diener.
- George Diener, the real-life father, died of cancer in April 1981 at age 52.
- Carol Diener, Richie's mother, died in November 2000 at age 67.
