= Mavrix Photo, Inc. v. Brand Technologies, Inc. =

Case in American intellectual property law

- Court: United States Court of Appeals for the Ninth Circuit
- Argued: Oct. 8, 2010
- Decided: Aug. 8, 2011
- Citation: 647 F.3d 1218 (9th Cir. 2011)

Case history
- Prior actions: motion to dismiss granted, 2009 WL 3063062 (C.D. Cal. 2009)

Court membership
- Judges sitting: Kim McLane Wardlaw, William A. Fletcher, and Barbara M. Lynn

Keywords
- Personal jurisdiction in internet cases in the United States, Personal jurisdiction

Mavrix Photo, Inc. v. Brand Technologies, Inc., 647 F.3d 1218 (9th Cir. 2011), is a case in American intellectual property law involving personal jurisdiction in the context of internet contacts.

This case had three significant holdings. First, the defendant, Brand Technologies, Inc., lacked sufficient contacts with California for exercise of general jurisdiction. Second, the defendant's alleged copyright infringement on its website was expressly aimed at California enough to find specific jurisdiction. Finally, the defendant's alleged copyright infringement caused harm that it recognized was likely to be suffered in California enough to find specific jurisdiction.

== Facts ==
In April 2008, photographers for Mavrix Photo, Inc., a Florida corporation whose principal business was in Miami, took "candid" photos of a hip-hop pop singer Fergie and her husband during their vacation in the Bahamas. Mavrix registered copyright of those photographs for its business to exclusively license them to celebrity news outlets. However, shortly thereafter, Mavrix found that Brand Technologies, Inc., an Ohio corporation, had put those photographs on to its website (www.celebrity-gossip.net), allegedly without Mavrix's permission. This website has several interactive features, and was ranked as number 3,622 out of approximately 180 million websites worldwide based on traffic by Alexa.com, an Internet tracking service. It was a prominently popular website.

Mavrix sued Brand Technologies, Inc. and its CEO, Brad Mandell (collectively, "Brand") in the Central District of California for infringement of copyright of its photographs. Many of the celebrities whom Mavrix took photos of worked in Southern California and Mavrix kept a Los Angeles base, employed Los Angeles-based photographers, and had a registered agent in California. In addition, it paid fees to the California Franchise Tax Board. Brand moved to dismiss the action on several grounds, including lack of personal jurisdiction.

== Judicial history ==
Mavrix brought lawsuit against Brand in federal district court for the Central District of California, contending that Brand infringed Mavrix's copyright under 17 U.S.C. §§ 501, 502, and 504 by posting its copyrighted photos on its website. Brand moved to dismiss for lack of personal jurisdiction (see Federal Rule of Civil Procedure 12(b)(2)). The district court denied Mavrix's motion for jurisdictional discovery and granted Brand's motion to dismiss for lack of personal jurisdiction. The United States Court of Appeals for the Ninth Circuit remanded and reversed. The Supreme Court of the United States denied the petition for writ of certiorari to the United States Court of Appeals for the Ninth Circuit on Jan. 17, 2012.

== Opinion ==
The Ninth Circuit, firstly, stated that the plaintiff bears the burden of establishing that the jurisdiction is proper.

=== General jurisdiction ===
==== Facts ====
Brand (1) allowed third parties to advertise businesses, such as jobs, in California on its website; (2) sells, or allows a third-party vendors to sell, tickets to California events on its website; (3) employs a California firm to design its website; (4) has business relationships with California-based national news organization, an Internet advertising agency and a wireless provider; and (5) maintained a "highly interactive" website which had features of commenting, receiving email newsletters, voting in polls and uploading user-generated content.

==== Court ruling ====
To find general jurisdiction over Brand, the Ninth Circuit pointed out that the supreme court and itself have denied the exercise of general jurisdiction over a non-resident defendant when there were no substantial, continuous, or systematic contacts in the alleged jurisdiction.

==== Conclusion ====
Applying the rule above, the court concluded that those contacts did not satisfy the requisite showing for general jurisdiction. Firstly, the court found that Brand was not registered to do business in CA, had no registered agent and no burden for state taxes. Secondly, the court stated, regarding (1) the advertisement that nonresident defendant's advertisement is influential only when it markets its own product by targeting forum residents but not when just other entities use the defendant's publication to promote their own businesses as in this case. With regard to (2) ticket sales, the court pointed out that they were third parties' business and insufficient to recognize the jurisdiction. Relating to (3) the employment of California web-design firm, the court decided it as "fortuitous circumstance" which is insufficient to premise jurisdiction because the firm formed California branch after its establishment of celebrity-gossip website. Also, the court stated (5) business relationship with California company was not sufficient, citing that "engaging in commerce with residents of the forum state is not in and of itself the kind of activity that approximates physical presence within the state's borders." And finally, regarding (6) interactive website, the court deemed it as standard attributes of many website. It said that if it permit general jurisdiction based on access to such website, it would lead to the result inconsistent with constitutional requirement of "the continuous corporate operation within a state" be "so substantial and of such a nature as to justify suit against" the non-resident defendant.

=== Specific jurisdiction ===
==== Rule ====
First, the court declared three-pronged test, so called "minimum contact" test that "(1) The non-resident defendant must purposefully direct his activities or consummate some transaction with the forum or resident thereof; or perform some act by which he purposefully avails himself of the privilege of conducting activities in the forum, thereby invoking the benefits and protections of its laws; (2) the claim must be one which arises out of or relates to the defendant's forum-related activities; and (3) the exercise of jurisdiction ... must be reasonable." The court stated that the plaintiff bears the burden of proof of (1) and (2), and if the plaintiff did so, the defendant bears the shifted burden of proof regarding (3) to tell the jurisdiction would be unreasonable.

The court also pointed out the Calder "effects" test (Note: The Calder "effects" test is a test for personal jurisdiction described in Calder v. Jones, 465 U.S. 783 (1984).) The first prong of the specific jurisdiction test refers to both purposeful direction and purposeful availment. In cases involving tortious conduct, the court most often employs a purposeful direction analysis. In tort cases, the court typically inquires whether a defendant purposefully directs his activities at the forum state, applying an "effects" test that focuses on the forum in which the defendant's actions were felt, whether or not the actions themselves occurred within the forum. Regarding the first prong that it requires (a) an intentionally committed act, (b) expressly aimed act at the forum state, (c) causing harm that the defendant recognized it is likely to be suffered in the forum state.

==== Conclusion ====
The court affirmed specific jurisdiction under the first prong test using the effects test. Regarding the effects test (a), the court found that Brand obviously intentionally posted the assertedly copyright-infringing photos. Also, regarding (b), because Brand used Mavrix's photos to exploit the California market for its commercial purpose, the court recognized Brand's activity as "expressly aimed" for its website with national popularity and scope appealing to and profiting from an audience in a particular state. Furthermore, the court stated that because the photos' value was foreseeably based on the significant number of Californians that would have bought the publication of the photos, Brands' conduct of posting those photos resulted in the harm of such California-based value.

== See also ==
- Personal jurisdiction in Internet cases in the United States
- Keeton v. Hustler Magazine, Inc., 465 U.S. 770, 779 n. 11, 104 S.Ct. 1473, 79 L.Ed.2d 790 (1984).
- World-Wide Volkswagen Corp. v. Woodson, 444 U.S. 286, 295, 100 S.Ct. 559, 62 L.Ed.2d 490 (1980).
- Zippo Manufacturing Co. v. Zippo Dot Com, Inc., 952 F.Supp. 1119 (W.D. Pa. 1997).
- Cybersell, Inc. v. Cybersell, Inc., 130 F.3d 414, 418–19 (9th Cir. 1997).
- Dole Food Co., Inc. v. Watts, 303 F.3d 1104, 1113 (9th Cir. 2002).
- Harvard Law Review "Ninth Circuit Holds that Exercise of Personal Jurisdiction over Company Whose Website Cultivates Significant Forum State User Base Comports with Due Process."
