= Chester the Molester =

Comic strip by Dwaine B. Tinsley

- Author: Dwaine B. Tinsley
- Current status/schedule: Ended
- Launch date: 1976
- End date: 1989
- Publisher: Hustler
- Genre: Adult comics

Chester the Molester was a comic strip by Dwaine B. Tinsley (December 31, 1945 – May 23, 2000), cartoon editor of the pornographic magazine Hustler. Tinsley produced the strip's monthly issues for 13 years, from 1976 to 1989. The tongue-in-cheek strip shows Chester, a middle-aged pedophile, joyfully molesting women and young girls, or tricking or attempting to trick them into sexually compromising positions. After increasing controversy, the cartoon became Chester and Hester, Hester as an unattractive middle-aged woman who was Chester's girlfriend in crime. Following the alleged religious conversion of Hustler founder Larry Flynt in 1977, the strip was briefly retooled as Chester the Protector, a reincarnation of Chester who served to protect young girls from rape and seduction.

Tinsley was arrested on May 18, 1989, after being accused by his 18-year-old daughter Allison of molesting her since she was 13. According to court records, he allegedly told his coworkers, "You can't write about this stuff all the time if you don't experience it." Tinsley was found guilty of five counts of child molestation; he was convicted on January 5, 1990, and was sentenced to six years in prison. During his incarceration, he briefly continued dispatching new strips to Hustler from his cell to be edited by Edward Kuhnel. Tinsley's conviction was overturned in 1992 when an appeals court ruled that the jury should not have based the conviction on his strip, violating the First Amendment. The prosecutor in the case ultimately decided not to retry him after he served 23 months. Flynt claims he did not ask Tinsley about the conviction and defended him. He died of a heart attack in 2000 aged 54.
