= Joan Robinson Hill =

American socialite and equestrian

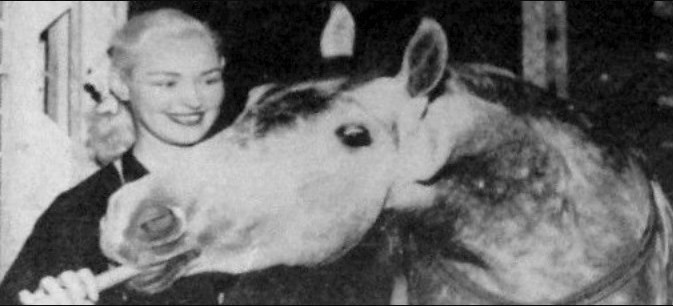
- Joan Robinson and her horse, Beloved Belinda, 1953
- Born: February 6, 1931; Houston, Texas, U.S.
- Died: March 19, 1969 (aged 38); Houston, Texas, U.S.
- Occupations: Equestrian, socialite
- Known for: National competitor in equestrian events Death in unexplained circumstances
- Spouse: John Hill (m. 1957)

Joan Olive Robinson Hill (February 6, 1931 – March 19, 1969) was a socialite and equestrian from Houston, Texas. Her unexplained death at age 38 led to her husband, John Hill, becoming the first person to be indicted by the state of Texas on the charge of murder by omission. The case precipitated a series of events that included the 1972 murder of John Hill, and two years later, the fatal police shooting of the man accused of that murder. Adopted as an infant by wealthy oil tycoon Davis Ashton "Ash" Robinson and his wife, Rhea, Joan became an equestrian at a young age. She excelled and continued the sport into adulthood, ultimately winning several national titles.

After two youthful marriages that ended in divorce, Joan married plastic surgeon John Hill in 1957. After a tumultuous marriage, she died following a short illness on March 19, 1969. Autopsy examinations failed to determine a cause of death beyond an infection from an unknown source. Ash subsequently accused John of poisoning Joan, and petitioned the district attorney to prosecute John for murder. John's murder trial was held in February 1971, but ended in a mistrial. As a second trial was approaching, John was gunned down by an intruder at his home. A suspect, Bobby Wayne Vandiver, was arrested and indicted for the murder, but was killed in a shootout with police before his trial. Two other suspects, Marcia McKittrick and Lilla Paulus, were convicted as accomplices to John's murder and served time in prison.

The case was the subject of Thomas Thompson's 1976 book Blood and Money and the 1981 made-for-television film Murder in Texas.

== Early life ==
Davis Ashton "Ash" Robinson studied dentistry at Tulane College, New Orleans, but disliked the subject and chose not to follow it as a career. Instead, he embarked on a series of business ventures, making and losing several fortunes before becoming an oilman. He met Rhea Ernestine Gardere in New Orleans, and they married on July 28, 1919. After settling in Houston, the couple discovered that Rhea was unable to bear children, and Ash suggested that they should adopt a child instead. In March 1931, Rhea visited the Edna Gladney Home in Fort Worth, where she was introduced to the one-month-old Joan Olive, who had been given up for adoption by her unmarried mother. The Robinsons adopted the baby girl.

Journalist Thomas Thompson writes that as a child, Joan "was as well attended as a czarina". A keen horsewoman, she began riding at age three. At five, she won her first ribbon in equitation at the Houston Livestock Show and Rodeo, coming in third on Dotty, an aging horse that her father had bought for her. It was the first of many contests she entered on Dotty in horse shows across the Southern United States. By the age of seven, she was regularly competing at an amateur level on three- and five-gaited American Saddlebred horses, and she continued to achieve success, attaining first or second place in almost every contest she entered between 1938 and 1945.

== Career and first marriages ==
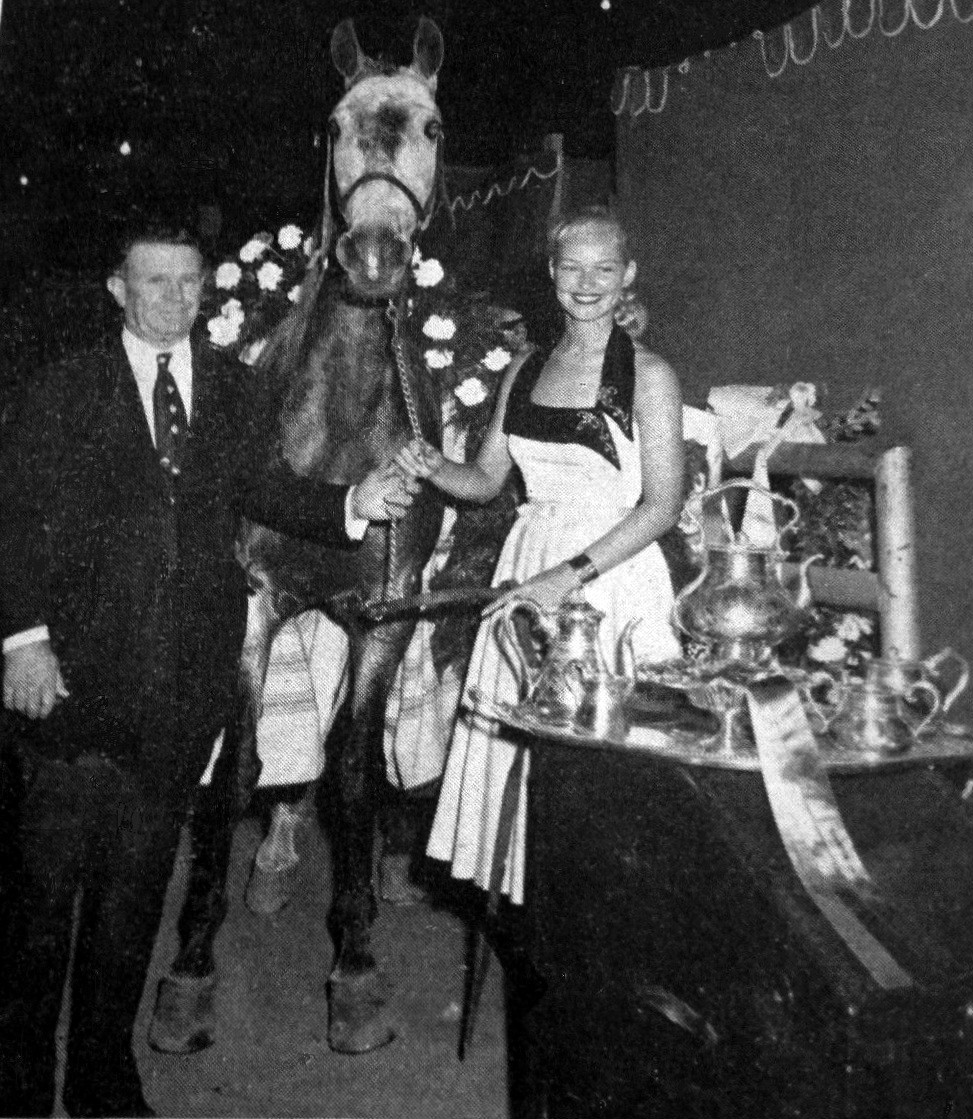
Robinson and Beloved Belinda, winners in the five-gaited competition at the Pin Oak Charity Horse Show, Houston, 1953

Joan attended Stephens College in Columbia, Missouri, where she was an average student with an active social life. Her father leased a suite of rooms at a hotel close to the campus, and installed his wife there, visiting on a regular basis himself. When Joan started acting in amateur college productions, she was approached by a talent scout working for Metro–Goldwyn–Mayer, who offered her a screen test. Ash refused to permit her to take up the invitation, believing Hollywood to be full of predators who would take advantage of the girl. While in college, she married twice, both times before the age of 20. She married Spike Benton, who had a promising career as a Navy pilot, then New Orleans lawyer and childhood friend Cecil Burglass. Her father did not approve of her choices, and each marriage lasted little more than six months.

Joan competed professionally throughout the 1950s and 1960s, winning as many as 500 trophies on her American Saddlebred horses CH Beloved Belinda (WCC, WC, RWCC, RWC. ASR 46246M) and CH Precious Possession (WC, RWCC, RWC. ASR 57000M). She had a riding habit made in the same color as Beloved Belinda, described by Thompson as "a lustrous pearl gray", which she wore at shows, starting the fashion of wearing a light-colored habit.

== Marriage to John Hill ==
On September 28, 1957, Joan married Dr. John Hill, described by the Houston Chronicle as "one of the city's leading plastic surgeons".

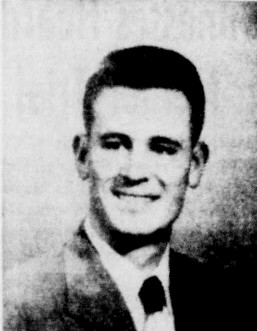
John Hill in 1956

John Robert Hill (1931–1972) was the second of three children born to farmer Robert Raymond Hill, and his wife, Myra Hannah (Rice) Hill, of Edcouch, Texas. Hill's mother was deeply religious and Hill was raised in a strict Christian household. Hill was also religious and attended the Church of Christ. At their mother's insistence, all three Hill children received piano lessons, with John and Julian becoming gifted musicians. Hill studied a liberal arts course at Abilene Christian College, where he graduated summa cum laude; he then attended Baylor College of Medicine in Houston. After graduating, he took a residency in surgery at Houston's Hermann Hospital.

During the 1950s, Houston-based surgeons such as Michael E. DeBakey and Denton Cooley were pioneering new heart-surgery techniques, attracting a high volume of medical residents who wished to study under their tutelage. Realizing that the city would soon be awash with cardiac surgeons, Hill looked at alternative surgical careers, eventually opting for plastic surgery. At the time, only 10 certified plastic surgeons were practicing in Houston, and Hill believed he could make more money in the profession. He was a popular member of the residency program, but almost had his medical career cut short after perforating a patient's bowel during a routine operation, then stitching the man up without repairing the damage. The patient later died of peritonitis, and Hill received a severe reprimand after an autopsy uncovered his mistake. Upon completing his residency, Hill was offered a partnership by Nathan Roth, a New York City-trained surgeon who had established himself in Houston, and he joined the practice in 1963. Hill's partnership with Roth got off to a difficult start after he failed to warn his first patient that a drill bit had broken off during a jaw repair operation, leaving it embedded in the patient's face. When challenged by Roth, Hill was apologetic about his error, saying he had been "hesitant to mention this mistake on my very first case". Hill's brother, Julian, had committed suicide shortly before the incident, and Roth gave Hill the benefit of the doubt because of this. The partnership between Hill and Roth was dissolved in 1967 after Roth grew tired of the other surgeon's repeated requests that Roth cover for him so that he could give music recitals. Hill then established his own practice in the same building as his former business partner.

The Hills became a regular part of Houston's social scene, but largely led separate lives. For the first six years of their marriage, they lived at Ash Robinson's property, moving from there only after a fellow surgeon suggested the idea to John. Joan continued to focus on her equestrian career, while John devoted his spare time to performing and listening to music. When Joan officially retired Beloved Belinda, the event made national headlines. Sports Illustrated reported that a band played "Auld Lang Syne" while Joan led Belinda, covered in a blanket of red roses, around the show ring at the Pin Oak horse show for the last time in 1959. A groom who was present commented to his wife that "Abe Lincoln hisself didn't have a funeral as good as this one."

== Later years and illness ==
=== The Kirby Drive house and the music room ===
On June 14, 1960, the Hills had a son, whom they named Robert Ashton Hill, but who was quickly nicknamed Boot by his grandfather. Robinson then bought his daughter a farm after she told him of her ambition to breed horses and establish a riding school. The property, named Chatsworth Farm, was opened in 1963, and became the scene of an annual spring picnic for Houston's doctors and their families. (Note: The name Chatsworth Farm was chosen because Robinson Hill's great-great-great grandfather, Louis Riviere Francois Gardere, had a plantation in Baton Rouge, Louisiana, by that name. Gardere built one of the first horse-racing tracks in the United States there.) In 1965, the Hills also bought a house at 1561 Kirby Drive, a Southern colonial-style house located in the wealthy neighborhood of River Oaks, a few blocks from the Robinsons' home.

John Hill, whose interest in music began in childhood, was proficient on the piano, as well as the trombone, tuba, flute, and recorder. As a young man, he aspired to become a piano player for a dance band, but his mother steered both sons toward medicine. Hill dedicated at least 20 hours a week to his interest in music – taking lessons, practicing, and participating in concerts. He was an active member of several groups, including the Houston Brass Quintet and the Heartbeats. (Note: He was later asked to leave the group after taking Ann Kurth along to one of their concerts and introducing her as his fiancée, something that offended the conservative wives of the band members.) Following the success of his own practice, he announced to Joan that he wished to convert a former servant's room into a "music room" at their house. Hill asked Ash Robinson to lend him $10,000 for the project, but Robinson refused as he believed it to be frivolous, and Hill already had a loan from him to buy the house.

Hill then arranged for a bank loan, enabling him to pay off the money Robinson had lent the couple to buy the Kirby Drive house, then commissioned a sound engineer to create the music room, telling him, "I want the finest music room since Renaissance Italy." Its estimated $10,000 cost was quickly exceeded, and by October 1968, Hill had spent $75,000 on the venture. One of his ambitions was to own a handmade Bösendorfer piano, the world's most expensive. On hearing that a local firm had obtained the Austrian company's Houston franchise, he ordered an Imperial Grand for $15,000. The Bösendorfer was delivered in March 1969 and installed beside a Yamaha grand belonging to Joan. Having cost in excess of $100,000, in March 1969 John Hill's music room was almost complete.

It became a ballroom-sized room with a double-height ceiling full of Renaissance-type frescoes, with Baccarat crystal chandeliers. The carved marble fireplace was taken from an old Louisiana plantation home. Hill chose parquet flooring and a gold and white color scheme for the entire room. The pianos were placed at one end, with French provincial sofas cushioned by an oriental carpet at the other end. Gold and white silk wall panels concealed shelves for records, music-related books, and Hill's musical instruments. Hill had 108 speakers installed in the room, connected with four miles of wiring. He spent more than $20,000 on the room's sound system. Hill also added a hidden movie screen on which to project his collection of comedy films, which was also hidden behind one of the silk wall panels. The room became a bone of contention; Joan was angry about the amount of money her husband had poured into realizing his dream. During their 1968 separation, she had confided in Patti Gordon, a friend who owned a restaurant, that the music room had been central to their troubles. "He doesn't care about me or our son or anybody else. Only that god damned music room. I wish we had never started building it."

Meanwhile, Chatsworth Farm did not achieve the success that Joan had envisaged, and was not turning a profit. A trainer had worked there until 1967, but he left because he did not get on with Robinson, and by 1969, Robinson was considering selling the place. Joan wanted to keep it running, however, and persuaded Diane Settegast, a friend from Dallas, to take on the temporary role of trainer.

=== Marital problems ===
By 1968, the Hills had begun to have significant conflicts in their marriage. Hill had embarked on an extramarital affair with Ann Kurth, a thrice-divorced mother of three sons whom he met when they were both collecting their respective children from summer camp in August 1968. Kurth and Hill became romantically involved a short time after their meeting at the camp. (Note: Hill and Kurth had two differing stories on how their relationship began. Hill's version was that Kurth made a play for him at the camp. Kurth claimed that he boldly telephoned her the day after their initial tryst and told her that he would be taking up all her time from now on.) When Joan returned from a horse show outside Houston, she found a note from her husband saying that he had left because things were "not good between us". She phoned her husband's office many times in search of a better explanation from him; Hill did not return his wife's calls. Ash Robinson suggested the use of a private detective to learn what John Hill was up to; Joan was against this idea.

Two weeks after his leaving, Hill asked to meet with his wife for a talk. John Hill told his wife that he was having an affair, and that he was being blackmailed because of it. Soon, Joan learned that the woman's name was Ann Kurth. Hill, who had been staying at Kurth's home, proceeded to rent a small apartment in Houston's Post Oak district.

The couple was still living apart in November 1968, when Hill had divorce papers served on his wife. Ash Robinson, who had hired detectives to investigate his son-in-law, learned of his Post Oak apartment from their report. Joan told her father that she still wanted to make her marriage work, despite her husband's infidelity, and contested the divorce.

In early December 1968, Ash Robinson phoned Hill at his Post Oak apartment, asking Hill to meet with him at the Robinson home. Robinson had drafted a letter of apology and a reconciliation offer to his daughter he wanted Hill to sign. Hill was in debt to Robinson for household and professional expenses, and his father-in-law implied that he would begin pressing for repayment if Hill did not return to his wife. Hill signed the letter written by Ash Robinson and prepared to go back to the Kirby Drive home. Hill withdrew his divorce petition when the couple reconciled shortly before Christmas of that year. Not long after his return, Kurth began pressing Hill, telling him that if he stayed with Joan, Kurth would no longer be a part of his life. He continued to see Kurth after returning to live with his wife.

Diane Settegast and Eunice Woolen, who stayed with the Hills as house guests a week before Joan's death, would later describe how Hill brought home pastries, but insisted on choosing which ones each of them would eat. (Note: The women were friends of Joan Robinson Hill. Settegast, a riding instructor, had been Chatsworth Farm's manager from September 1968 to February 1969. She was in Houston to talk with Ash Robinson about returning to a position at the farm.) Hill would return home with the pastries in the evenings after being called away by a message on his pager. On Friday, March 14, the Hills attended Houston's annual wild-game dinner, where John played a concert with the Heartbeats. They left early, and on the way home, Joan asked her husband if he would be staying out all night again. When he said that he probably would, she reminded him that he had done this on two previous occasions that week. The conversation quickly descended into an argument in which she told him that if he did stay out, he should not bother to come back. When they arrived home, she got out of the car, and he began to drive away, at which point she became angry and shouted, "You've blown it, John! You've just lost your wife, your son, and your god damn music room."

Shortly before the arrival of her house guests, Joan had learned that her husband was still maintaining his small apartment and still involved with Ann Kurth. On the day following the argument, Hill took his son for a haircut, and during the drive, they went to his apartment to pick up some things; the boy talked with his mother about it when he arrived home. Joan invited her friend and neighbor Vann Maxwell over to discuss the matter, and when she arrived, announced an impromptu game of bridge with Settegast and Woolen in the music room. John Hill was listening to music at one end of the room while the women played cards at the other. Joan began loudly discussing her husband, then slipping into silence whenever he approached. She told the women that she was planning to consult a lawyer on Monday, and Maxwell became uneasy with the situation. She asked Joan to be quiet or she would leave. Joan then started writing notes to her friend, in which she repeated her intention to speak to a lawyer, and to take John out of her will. After a tense evening, Hill put on a romantic record and came over to stand behind his wife's chair. Settegast suggested the couple should dance, and they did. Afterwards, they retired to bed. The next morning, Joan told Settegast that Hill had made her "very happy" the previous night. "He told me things I've never heard from the man before in our whole married life. I think it's going to be all right between us from now on."

=== Illness ===
Settegast and Woolen recalled a conversation they had with Joan after she rose late on the afternoon of Saturday, March 15. She told them, "John gave me some pill last night and it really knocked me out". She spent most of the following day in bed after she vomited her breakfast. After checking on her several times, Hill told the two house guests that he was going out to purchase medication for her. Hill took his son and the two women out for dinner that evening, but Joan was too sick to join them. Hill bought her a carton of orange juice on the way home, then went to visit a friend. Joan continued to be ill, vomiting several more times. On Monday, March 17, Settegast and Woolen came to say goodbye to Joan, as they were returning to Dallas. Joan told the women she felt dehydrated and asked for some water. She told her friends she would be all right as they prepared to leave. Effie Green, the Hills' maid, was told that Mrs. Hill was sick in bed and was not to be disturbed for any reason.

On the morning of Tuesday, March 18, Effie went to check on Joan after the doctor had left for the day. She found Joan in a soiled nightgown; when she moved her to help her change into a fresh gown, Effie saw that Joan had been lying in dried feces. Two towels had been placed under her due to a recent loose bowel movement that appeared to contain blood. The maid did her best to help Joan into the bathroom to clean her. As she did this, Effie noticed that Joan's face began turning blue. The maid hurriedly cleaned up Joan and the soiled bed and called to her husband, who also worked for the Hills, to phone Mrs. Hill's parents' home at once. When no one answered, Archie Green tried unsuccessfully to reach John Hill at his office and left a message. Rhea Robinson was unaware of Joan's condition when her husband dropped her off at the Hill home to visit her daughter.

The severity of Joan's illness was known only to those in the Hill household until the morning of March 18, 1969, when her mother entered her daughter's sickroom. She found Joan lying in her own body wastes and vomit as John Hill stood at the foot of his wife's bed. When Robinson found that her daughter had a fever, Hill told his mother-in-law he thought Joan should be taken to a hospital. Hill did not summon an ambulance for his wife, who was now semiconscious, but insisted on driving her to the hospital himself. The hospital he chose was not one of Houston's noted medical centers, but a new hospital in Houston's suburbs, Sharpstown General Hospital, which was a 20 minute drive from the Hill home. (Note: The largest medical center in the world, Texas Medical Center, was a 7-minute drive from the Hill home. John Hill was practicing at Hermann Hospital, part of Texas Medical Center, at the time he and Joan were married.) (Note: The hospital was since renamed Bayou City Medical Center and River Oaks South; it was closed in 2008.) The hospital had no emergency room or intensive care unit at the time of Joan's admission. She was taken into the hospital by a nurse who had come to the car with a wheelchair and was taken to a private room on arrival.

During the drive, Joan told her mother she was going blind; her husband referred to this as a "blackout". Upon arrival at Sharpstown General, Robinson Hill's blood pressure was 60/40; the hospital nurse promptly took a second reading, as she believed that she had made some sort of error. After determining that the reading was correct, the nurse believed Joan was in shock and placed a call to Dr. Walter Bertinot, who was named as his wife's attending physician by John Hill. Bertinot, who knew Joan only socially, had no reason to believe she was seriously ill until the call from the hospital nurse. Hill had described his wife's symptoms as nausea, vomiting, and diarrhea; Bertinot initially thought she was suffering from influenza. When Bertinot arrived in Joan's hospital room, she recognized him and made reference to a party which they had both attended. Bertinot ordered IV fluids, took another history, and now believed she had a case of foodborne illness.

Still uneasy after his second diagnosis, Dr. Bertinot consulted a colleague, Dr. Frank Lanza, who believed Joan to be in septic shock. The doctors ordered blood cultures, which would take 72 hours to process. (Note: The results of the blood culture for Robinson Hill taken as a hospital patient was negative. However, having a negative result does not mean that bacteria were not present. A series of blood cultures may be needed before bacteria are discovered.) Joan had been a patient at Sharpstown General for six hours when her kidneys began to fail; she was not passing any urine and had edema. Her intravenous fluids were increased with the hope of being able to prompt her kidneys into producing urine. By 8:00 pm, Joan Robinson Hill's kidneys had failed to respond and her condition was considered to be "grave". Dr. Bernard Hicks, a kidney specialist, was called in to consult. Dr. Hicks determined Joan was in severe kidney failure. Since Sharpstown General had no dialysis machine, the medical team debated about transferring Joan to Houston Methodist Hospital, where such equipment was available, but Dr. Hicks believed she was too ill to be transferred. The option for treating her at the hospital was to begin peritoneal dialysis. Dr. Hicks wanted the consent of John Hill before beginning this procedure and phoned him at the Kirby Drive home at 9:15 pm. Hill left the house after taking the telephone call, but did not arrive at Sharpstown General to give his consent until 11 pm. His wife was conscious and begged him to stay with her, saying that she was frightened.

Dr. Bertinot checked on Joan at 12:30 am on March 19. While she had not improved, she appeared to have stabilized. Her blood pressure had elevated slightly and she was responding to the peritoneal dialysis. Bertinot felt he could now leave the hospital to get some rest, but Dr. Lanza said he would stay a while longer and would call Dr. Bertinot if anything should change. John Hill also felt he could get some sleep and retired to a couch in a hospital records room. By 1:30 am, both Dr. Lanza and Dr. Hicks had left the hospital. Joan, who had been heavily sedated, was coherent at times. When Hill told her he would be down the hall if needed, she asked the nurse attending her to see that her husband was made comfortable there.

== Death, investigation, trials ==
=== Death ===
At 2:30 am on March 19, the attending nurse noticed that Joan's vital signs indicated sudden heart failure. She ran to the room's doorway and shouted to the nurses' station to have the resident on duty come immediately with cardiac failure equipment. As she did this, Joan slightly raised her head, gasping her husband's name. As she tried to breathe, a flood of blood rushed from her mouth. The resident tried to save her by injecting adrenaline into her heart, but he was not successful.

=== First autopsy ===
Texas state law at the time required an autopsy, before any embalming or burial could take place, for anyone who died in a hospital within 24 hours of admission. Dr. Bertinot spoke to John Hill about the legal need for an autopsy. Hill asked Jim Oates to call a local funeral home to claim Robinson Hill's body. Less than four hours after her death, the funeral home removed Robinson Hill's body from the hospital.

Within an hour after moving the body from Sharpstown General, the funeral home began the process of embalming Robinson Hill's body. The hospital's pathologist, Dr. Arthur Morse, arrived at the funeral home at 10 am to carry out the autopsy, only to find that the body had already been embalmed. Morse concluded his autopsy at 11:30 am without finding any signs of what caused Robinson Hill's death aside from a maroon coloration of her pancreas and offered an opinion that she may have died from pancreatitis.

=== Second autopsy ===
Since receiving Dr. Morse's opinion that his daughter had died from pancreatitis, Robinson had been consulting doctors on the matter, who had advised him that this was an unlikely cause of death. On the morning of Friday, March 21, the day of Joan Robinson Hill's funeral, Ash Robinson visited the office of Assistant District Attorney I. D. McMaster, where he accused John Hill of killing his daughter, telling McMaster of the circumstances surrounding her death and autopsy. McMaster asked Harris County Medical Examiner Joseph Jachimczyk to go to the funeral home to examine the body before the funeral. Jachimczyk ordered Morse to hand over blood and urine specimens taken from Robinson Hill. He then drove to the funeral home to view the body.

Jachimczyk delivered his report on the second autopsy at the end of March, ruling out any poisoning, and concluding, "it is my opinion based upon a reasonable probability that the cause of death is due to acute focal hepatitis, probably viral in origin." On reading the report, McMaster felt there was no case, but Robinson refused to believe that no crime had been committed. He hired lawyer Frank Briscoe, a former Harris County district attorney. Robinson petitioned his son-in-law to give permission for Joan's body to be exhumed for another autopsy, but Hill refused.

=== Third autopsy ===
Ash Robinson then hired Dr. Milton Helpern, the chief medical examiner for New York City at the time, to come to Houston to examine Robinson Hill's body. An autopsy was also requested by a Harris County grand jury investigating Robinson Hill's death. That autopsy was performed by a team of 10 doctors led by Dr. Robert Bucklin, who was then the medical examiner for Galveston County, and including Dr. Helpern, who was deputized as an acting Harris County medical examiner. Helpern examined the body of Joan Robinson Hill for seven and a half hours, then went back to New York City with his tissue samples, saying he would issue a report on his findings at a later date.

The series of autopsies indicated that Robinson Hill had suffered a "massive infection" from an undetermined source, but because the body had been embalmed before an initial examination was conducted, an exact cause of death could not be identified. Dr. Bucklin listed Robinson Hill's cause of death as meningitis and sepsis. Following the autopsy, Joseph Jachimczyk issued a fresh report in which he observed, "It is now my opinion that Joan Robinson Hill came to her death as a result of a fulminating infectious process, the specific nature of which is no longer determinable." Dr. Helpern's report, issued in April 1970, noted that John Hill's treatment of his wife at home and the delay in seeking specialized medical attention at a hospital were factors in the death of Robinson Hill.

=== Prosecution and murder of John Hill ===
After Robinson Hill's death, Hill married Ann Kurth in June 1969, but divorced Kurth less than a year later, shortly before he was indicted for the murder of Robinson Hill. Following Hill's marriage to Kurth, Ash Robinson accused his former son-in-law of poisoning his daughter, and petitioned the district attorney to launch a murder investigation. A grand jury began hearing evidence in the summer of 1969, and retired without indicting Hill. District Attorney Carol Vance then put the case before a second grand jury, which ordered an exhumation of the body.

In February 1970, the case was heard by a third grand jury. This panel heard testimony from Ann Kurth, who told them that Hill had confessed to killing his wife and had also tried to kill Kurth on three occasions. Helpern presented his findings to the grand jury in April 1970. McMaster and his fellow assistant district attorney, Ernie Ernst, believed that Hill had murdered his wife, but that there was not enough evidence to indict him. Ernst suggested that they could try him for failing to provide an adequate level of care, which had resulted in her death. The jury voted 10–2 to indict Hill for murder by omission, deciding that he had "willfully, intentionally, and culpably" contributed to his wife's death because he had not given her sufficient medical help. The state of Texas had not previously indicted anyone on a charge of murder by omission.

Hill's murder trial began on February 15, 1971. Kurth testified against Hill, claiming that he had tried to kill her on June 30, 1969, by crashing their car into a bridge, and by injecting her with a hypodermic syringe. She also told the court that he had confessed to killing Robinson Hill, explaining in detail how he had allegedly done it by lacing pastries with infectious bacteria and later injecting Robinson Hill with the same bacteria. Kurth's testimony contradicted the charge of murder by omission in the indictment. As a result, Hill's attorney, Richard "Racehorse" Haynes, was granted a request for a mistrial. Hill's second trial was eventually scheduled for November 1972.

On September 24, 1972, a few weeks before the second trial was to start, Hill was shot dead by a masked gunman during a robbery at his mansion as Hill and his third wife, Connie, returned home from a medical conference in Las Vegas.

==== Involvement of Bobby Vandiver, Marcia McKittrick, and Lilla Paulus ====
Bobby Wayne Vandiver was arrested for Hill's murder in April 1973, but refused to cooperate with police until he was positively identified as the perpetrator by Hill's mother. When he confessed to the murder, he told police that he had done it for financial gain, and that the shooting was a contract killing that he had been asked to carry out for $5,000. During his confession, Vandiver implicated Marcia McKittrick and Lilla Paulus as having been accessories to Hill's murder.

On April 25, 1973, a grand jury voted to indict Vandiver and McKittrick for first-degree murder, and indict Paulus as an accomplice to murder. Vandiver's trial was set for September 1973. The trial was eventually rescheduled for April 1974, but Vandiver failed to appear. He had moved to Longview, Texas, adopting an alias. Longview police officer John Raymer grew suspicious of the newcomer to his town. After discovering the man's first name was actually Bobby, Raymer confronted Vandiver at a cafe one evening in May; Vandiver pulled a gun, and Raymer shot him dead.

Under questioning, McKittrick corroborated Vandiver's story. McKittrick was tried and convicted in 1974 of being Vandiver's getaway driver and given a 10-year jail sentence. She was paroled after serving five years.

Lilla Paulus was convicted and given a 35-year sentence. She died of breast cancer at the Gatesville prison on May 16, 1986.

== Cultural impact ==
The events surrounding the death of Joan Robinson Hill have been the subject of several books, as well as a 1981 television film. Journalist and author Thomas Thompson's 1976 book Blood and Money provides a detailed account of the case. He became interested in the story while shadowing doctors in Houston as research for a previous book, Hearts, about the world of cardiac surgery. Ann Kurth filed a $3-million lawsuit against Thompson over his description of her as a "provocatively dressed, heavily made-up woman", but her action was dismissed by a jury in Austin in March 1981, which decided that although derogatory, his description of her was accurate. The legal case was one of three Thompson faced over his book.

Kurth published her own account of the case entitled Prescription Murder, in which she repeated her claim that Hill had tried to kill her, and alleged that he may have poisoned his first wife with bacteria-laced pastries. (Note: Kurth further claimed that the suicide of Hill's brother, Julian, in 1963, was actually a murder by John Hill. Kurth wrote that Hill confessed to injecting his brother with an overdose of morphine because he was embarrassed by his brother's homosexuality. The official report states that the suicide resulted from a barbiturate overdose.) She also suggested that Hill had not been killed in 1972, and had instead moved to Mexico after faking his death. (Note: While Kurth said she believed Hill was alive and living in Mexico, Thomas Thompson, the author of Blood and Money, countered her claim by saying, "She has one eye on the cash register and no eye on the truth".) Retired Harris County District Attorney Carol Vance also discussed the case in his memoirs, Boomtown DA.

In 1981, the Robinson Hill case was the subject of Murder in Texas, a television film featuring Farrah Fawcett as Robinson Hill. It concurs with Kurth's theory that Hill may have faked his death, suggesting that he arranged for someone else to be killed in his place. Journalist Jerry Buck noted in an article preceding the film's debut on NBC that the face of the shooting victim had been battered and that there were anomalies in the autopsy report, notably that Hill had a different eye color from that recorded for the dead person. Buck also wrote that Hill was in financial difficulties with the Internal Revenue Service in 1972 and facing a murder case against him. Sightings of Hill had also been reported in Mexico and New York City.

This case was also covered in an episode ("I'm Fine, Look Away") on the podcast My Favorite Murder on May 9, 2019.

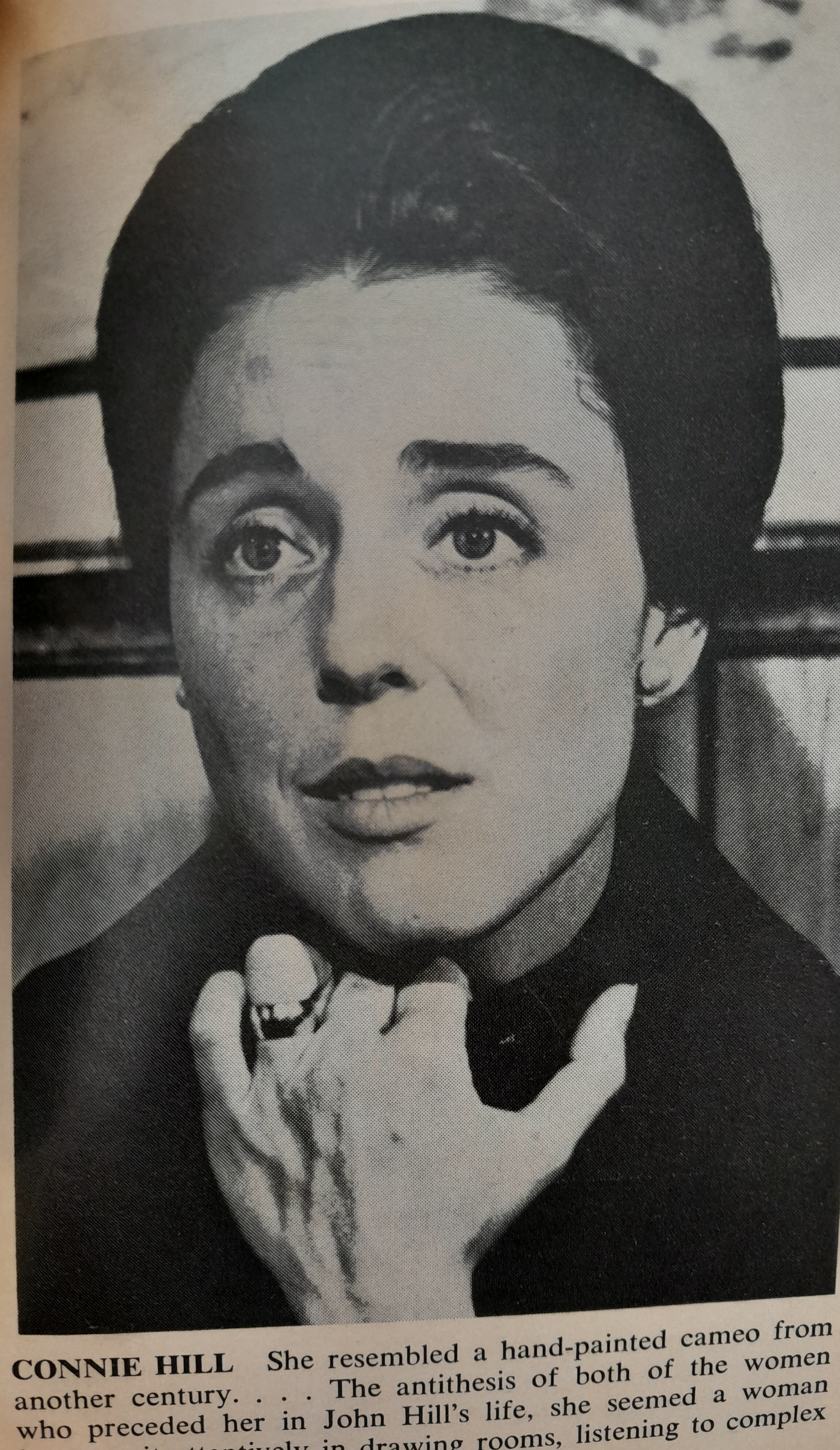

== Sources ==
- Evans, Colin (2007). Killer Doctors. Penguin Press. ISBN 978-1-10120-597-6.
- Sizer, Mona D. (2000). Texas Justice, Bought and Paid For. Taylor Trade Publications. ISBN 978-1-46162-555-1.
- Sizer, Mona D. (2008). Outrageous Texans: Tales of the Rich and Infamous. Taylor Trade Publications. ISBN 978-1-58979-402-3.
- Thompson, Thomas (1976). Blood and Money. New English Library.
- Thompson, Thomas (2001). Blood and Money (reprint ed.). Running Press. ISBN 978-0-78670-947-2.
