= Billy Dee =

American pornographic actor (born 1951)

- Born: William Randall Daniels; September 25, 1951 (age 74); San Diego, California, United States
- Other names: Obe-Wahn, Billie Dee, Billy D., Billy De, Ron Anderson, Robert Franklin, Billy Daniels, Obi Wahn
- Years active: 1978–1996
- Spouse: Nikki Knights

William Randall Daniels (born September 25, 1951), better known by the stage name Billy Dee, is an American retired adult film actor.

== Life and career ==
Born and raised in San Diego, California, Daniels is of mixed ancestry, of Irish, Mexican and African heritage, one of six children; he has four brothers and a sister. He worked from the age of 11, often on his grandfather's farm milking the cows, and lost his virginity at 14 in a barn, although he did not have sex again until he was 17. By the early 1970s, he began appearing in short 8mm film loops, appearing in the first of them at age 24. By 1978, at age 27, he appeared in his first big-budget porn flick, The Legend Of Lady Blue with fellow porn stars Gloria Leonard and John Leslie.

Daniels had the most prominent part of his career during the second-wave of the so-called Golden Age of Porn from the mid-late 1980s to the early-mid 1990s. In a period when the segregation of pornographic actors on racial lines was a sensitive issue and top female stars were often reluctant in performing with black males, being a very light-skinned African American man ("everyone thought he just had a great tan") and speaking "smoothly," Daniels could pass for white, securing him roles in top-rated pornographic productions with prominent porn stars such as Marilyn Chambers (Marilyn Chambers' Private Fantasies series) and one-time girlfriend and later wife, Nikki Knights, Knights worked with Dee in adult films. Dee made his adult debut with a small role in The Legend Of Lady Blue (1978) and also was the only African American actor the 1980s top star Traci Lords had performed with. Dee also played in productions with explicit black themes such as the porn parody Chocolate C.H.I.P.S. (1988) and Caught from Behind V: Blondes and Blacks (1986), the interracial special release in an anal sex video series. Daniels has been called a porn actor who had blurred the color lines in the American porn industry.

He was inducted into the XRCO Hall of Fame in 2002.

== Personal life ==
Billy Dee had a daughter with a girlfriend in the U.K. and later went on to marry adult actress Suzannah French. Now the grandfather to eight, and great grandfather to two, Daniels spends time between the U.K in Bristol and the U.S.
