= Celebrity (American TV series) =

American television drama series (1984)

- Genre: Drama
- Based on: Celebrity by Thomas Thompson
- Written by: William Hanley
- Directed by: Paul Wendkos
- Starring: Michael Beck; Joseph Bottoms; Ben Masters; James Whitmore
- Composer: Leonard Rosenman
- Country of origin: United States
- Original language: English
- No. of seasons: 1
- No. of episodes: 3

Production
- Producer: Rosilyn Heller
- Editors: James Galloway; David Newhouse; Eric A. Sears
- Running time: 313 minutes

Original release
- Network: NBC
- Release: February 12 – February 14, 1984

Celebrity is a television miniseries based on a novel by Thomas Thompson. It was broadcast from February 12 to February 14, 1984, on NBC.

== Series overview ==
Celebrity is based on a 1983 novel by Thomas Thompson. The series was filmed in Texas, New York and Los Angeles and is altogether six and a half hours long. In Germany, the UK and North America the series is published on VHS. The series was shown in Spain, Brazil, Finland, Turkey, Canada and former Yugoslavia.

== Plot ==
During their days as high school students in Texas, three friends – T.J. Luther, Mack Crawford and Kleber Cantrell – are involved in a rape. While only one of the boys commits the crime, the others watch and do nothing. The victim dies, and the boys hide the body and promise each other to never speak of it again.

All three grow up to be very successful in their fields. 25 years later, Kleber is a world-famous journalist, Mack is a movie star, and Luther is a demagogic evangelist who runs a controversial church. When they meet up again, the meeting ends in tragedy. One of the friends is shot dead, the other one is critically wounded and the third one is the murderer.

== Cast ==
Starring

- Michael Beck as T.J. Luther
- Joseph Bottoms as Mack Crawford
- Ben Masters as Kleber Cantrell

Guest starring

- James Whitmore as Clifford Casey
- Tess Harper as Susan French
- Karen Austin as Ceil Shannon
- Ned Beatty as Otto Leo
- Claude Akins as Uncle Bun Luther
- Dinah Manoff as Missy Craymore
- Debbie Allen as Regina Brown
- Jennifer Warren as Martha Dalton
- Hal Holbrook as Calvin Sledge

Co-starring

- Bonnie Bartlett as Mabel Hofmeyer
- Rhonda Dotson as Laurie Killman
- Jerry Hardin as Jonah Job
- Peter Nelson as Jeffie Crawford
  - River Phoenix as Young Jeffie Crawford
- Anne Haney as Millie
- Stephen Pearlman as Arnold Beckman
- Kelli Maroney as Joanne
- James N. Harrell as Dr. Taler
- Sherman Howard as Director
- John M. Jackson as Detective

== Awards and nominations ==
=== Nominations ===
Primetime Emmy Awards

- 1984: Outstanding Cinematography for a Limited Series or a Special (Philip H. Lathrop)

Edgar Allan Poe Awards:

- 1985: Best Television Feature or Miniseries (William Hanley)

== Critical reception ==
John J. Connor (The New York Times) mentions that the series has a strong cast. Furthermore, the series has a great script, which includes the major events during the 1950s, 1960s and 1970s, such as the Vietnam War or the assassination of John F. Kennedy. Tom Shales (The Deseret News) adds that the tale is very well plotted and "irresistible as a good rumor". According to Arthur Unger (Monitor) Celebrity is easy to watch and once started is difficult to stop.
