= Kathy Keeton =

American magazine publisher (1939–1997)

- Born: February 17, 1939
- Died: September 19, 1997 (aged 58)
- Citizenship: South Africa, United States
- Occupations: Film actor, Actor, Businessperson

Kathryn Keeton (February 17, 1939 – September 19, 1997) was an American magazine publisher along with her partner, and later husband, Penthouse publisher Bob Guccione.

== Early life and show business career ==
Born in South Africa and raised on a farm, Keeton took up dancing in childhood to strengthen a leg affected by polio. She won a scholarship to the Sadler's Wells Ballet in London, but left after she turned 18 to work in a nightclub. She appeared in bit parts in four British movies: Carlton-Browne of the F.O. (1959) (as a tabletop dancer), Expresso Bongo (1959), Too Hot to Handle (1960), and The Spy Who Came in from the Cold (1965) (as a stripper). At the age of 24 she was what The Associated Press called "one of the highest-paid strippers in Europe".

== Publishing career ==
She met Bob Guccione in 1965 and they remained together, although they did not marry until 1988. In his publishing company her title was President/Chief Operating Officer of General Media Communications, Inc. She founded the magazines Viva (1973), Omni (1978), and Longevity (1989). She also wrote two non-fiction books, Woman of Tomorrow (1986) and Longevity: The Science of Staying Young (1992). She was plaintiff in the landmark U.S. Supreme Court case of Keeton v. Hustler Magazine, Inc..

== Illness and death ==
After her diagnosis with breast cancer, Keeton treated herself with hydrazine sulfate, after reading about it in Penthouse, one of her own publications. She claimed that she had rid herself of, or shrunk almost all of, the tumors and extended her life by several years, after being given a dire initial prognosis of only six weeks to live by her doctors.

Keeton died of complications from surgery for an intestinal obstruction, aged 58, in New York City. Keeton was buried at "The Willows" (now known as Locusts on Hudson) in Staatsburg, New York, the country home she shared with her husband.
