= Carol Vance =

American lawyer (1933–2022)

Harris County District Attorney
- In office 1966–1979

Carol Stoner Vance Jr. (1933 - June 24, 2022) was an American lawyer and district attorney of Harris County in Houston, Texas, who served in that office from 1966 to 1979, and a former board member of the Texas Board of Criminal Justice, which governs the Texas Department of Criminal Justice.

For a period Vance was a resident of the Westbury area of Houston. In 1992, Governor of Texas Ann Richards named Vance as the head of the Texas Board of Criminal Justice.

Vance attended Houston public schools and graduated from the law school at the University of Texas in Austin. He served as Harris County assistant district attorney in 1958, shortly after graduating from law school, first under Dan Walton and then under Frank Briscoe.

He was appointed by Governor of Texas John Connally to fill the vacated district attorney’s spot when Frank Briscoe resigned to run for Congress in 1966 (Briscoe lost to Republican George H. W. Bush). At age 32, he became the second-youngest district attorney in Harris County history (only 21-year-old Peter Gray, chosen in 1842, was younger). He ran in the next election and won the position in his own right.

Vance served as district attorney from 1966 until resigning in 1979. He was unopposed in each of his elections.

== Trials ==
Some of the trials Vance was involved in, either as prosecutor or as district attorney, include the Elmer Wayne Henley/Houston mass murder case, the Joan Robinson Hill/John Hill murder cases, the Deep Throat v. Vance Supreme Court case, the Texas Supreme Court Justice Don Yarbrough impeachment case, the Lee Otis Johnson marijuana possession case, the Texas Southern University riot prosecutions, and the District Judge Garth Bates case.

== Honors ==
Vance served as president of the National District Attorneys Association and the Texas District and County Attorneys Association. He was selected as a fellow of the American College of Trial Lawyers.

In the 1990s, Vance asked state officials to implement the first Christian faith-based prison program at the Jester II Unit, a prison in Fort Bend County, Texas. State officials began to implement the program in 1996. The prison was renamed the Carol S. Vance Unit after Vance.

Vance retired as an employee from the law partnership Bracewell & Giuliani. In 2010 the book Boomtown DA, written by Vance, was published by Whitecaps Media. The book, using first person narration, begins with the Elmer Wayne Henley prosecution and roughly chronologically goes through Vance's terms from 1966 to 1979. Mary Flood of the Houston Chronicle stated "it appears a comfortable and engaging read".

== See also ==
- InnerChange Freedom Initiative
- Christianity in Houston
