= Myra Sadker =

American educator and researcher

Myra Pollack Sadker (1943 – March 18, 1995) was an American educator and researcher who published extensively on sexism in the American education system.

== Biography ==
Sadker was born in 1943 in Augusta, Maine, and attended Boston University (B.A. 1964), Harvard University (M.A. 1965), and the University of Massachusetts Amherst (Ph.D. 1971). During her early career, she taught at high schools in Massachusetts and Thailand, and at the University of Wisconsin-Parkside and Virginia State College.

Working at American University from 1973 to 1994, Sadker was at various times a professor and dean of education. She and her husband David Sadker conducted research into gender bias in American classrooms, publishing six books on the subject including Failing at Fairness: How Our Schools Cheat Girls. In the latter book, they claimed that schoolgirls suffered in terms of standardized testing scores and self-esteem as a result of teachers spending more time with male students and offering them more praise. They also found that girls who raise their hands in elementary school classes were less likely to be called upon than their male counterparts. The Sadkers made numerous media appearances including on the television shows The Oprah Winfrey Show, The Phil Donahue Show and Dateline NBC. In 1995, Myra Sadker received the American Association of University Women's Eleanor Roosevelt Award.

She died on March 18, 1995, as a result of complications from a bone marrow transplant for breast cancer. She was survived by her two daughters, Robin and Jackie.
