= Murder in Texas (film) =

1981 television film directed by William Hale

- Genre: Drama
- Based on: Prescription Murder by Ann Kurth
- Written by: John McGreevey
- Directed by: William Hale
- Starring: Katharine Ross; Sam Elliott; Farrah Fawcett; Andy Griffith
- Theme music composer: Leonard Rosenman
- Country of origin: United States
- Original language: English

Production
- Executive producers: David Salzman; Dick Clark; Preston Fischer
- Producer: William Hale (as Billy Hale)
- Cinematography: Donald M. Morgan
- Editor: John A. Martinelli
- Running time: 200 min
- Production company: Dick Clark Productions

Original release
- Network: NBC
- Release: May 3, 1981

Murder in Texas is a 1981 television film starring Katharine Ross, Sam Elliott, Farrah Fawcett, and Andy Griffith. The film was directed by William Hale, and was based on a true story; it was written for the TV screen by John McGreevey. It first aired on television in two parts on Sunday and Monday May 3–4, 1981.

== Plot ==
Based on the true story of the death of Joan Robinson Hill, this film tells of a plastic surgeon who was suspected of causing the death of his first wife, the daughter of a wealthy member of Houston society. The circumstances around her death – which was never solved – are clouded by a suspiciously hasty embalming and a hurried burial. The doctor then marries his mistress. In spite of two autopsies showing that his daughter died of natural causes, Ash Robinson, convinced that his daughter was murdered, sets out single-handedly to find out the true cause of her death, determined to see that the doctor is punished.

== Cast ==
- Katharine Ross as Ann Kurth Hill
- Sam Elliott as Dr. John Hill
- Farrah Fawcett as Joan Robinson Hill
- Andy Griffith as Ash Robinson
- G. W. Bailey as Richard "Racehorse" Haynes
- Barry Corbin as Dist. Atty. McMasters
- Pamela Myers as Mary
- Craig T. Nelson as Jack Ramsey
- Royce Wallace as Wilma
- Dimitra Arliss as Gina Meier
- Jude Farese as Casselli
- Philip Sterling as Dr. Helpern
- Vernon Weddle as Dr. Joe
- Lesley Woods as Reah Robinson
- Parley Baer as Ann's attorney
- Tim T Clark as Teenage Driver
- Helen Siff as Marian Timmons

== Reception ==
The movie was highly ranked in the Nielsen ratings. Part I was the fifth-most popular show for the week ending May 3, and Part II was the most popular show of the following week.

== Awards and nominations ==
Year	Award	Category	Nominee(s)	Result	Ref.
1981	Primetime Emmy Awards	Outstanding Supporting Actor in a Limited Series or a Special	Andy Griffith	Nominated	
1981	Primetime Emmy Awards	Outstanding Film Editing for a Limited Series or a Special	John A. Martinelli	Won	
1982	American Cinema Editors Awards	Best Edited Episode from a Television Mini-Series	John A. Martinelli	Nominated	
1982	Golden Globe Awards	Best Miniseries or Motion Picture Made for Television		Nominated	
