= I. D. McMaster =

American judge (1923–2004)

Ian Duskin McMaster Jr. (August 27, 1923 – June 23, 2004) was an American assistant district attorney, and district judge for the 179th Criminal Court in Harris County, Texas between 1972 and 1988. During a legal career spanning four decades, McMaster presided over several notable criminal cases, including the 1971 murder trial of John Hill, a Houston-based cosmetic surgeon who was accused of killing his wife.

== Life and career ==
Born in Galveston, Texas, McMaster graduated from Houston's Lamar High School before joining the United States Army Air Corps. Stationed in Europe during World War II, he served as a bomber pilot and flew cargo planes, before returning to the United States to take up a place at the University of Houston, where he studied airport administration. He had also completed his degree when his father-in-law, a lawyer in Port Arthur, suggested he follow a legal career. McMaster studied at Houston Law School, and was a member of the school's first graduating class. After working as a defense lawyer for twelve years, McMaster joined the Harris County district attorney's office, where he became an assistant district attorney. He spent eleven years in the post of assistant district attorney, becoming Chief Prosecutor, and Chief of the Grand Jury Division, before he was elected as a District Judge in 1972.

McMaster served as a district judge in the 179th Criminal Court for sixteen years, retiring from the bench in 1988. He presided over a number of famous cases during his legal career. Perhaps his most notable was as a prosecutor of the 1971 murder trial of Dr. John Hill, a Houston physician accused of poisoning his wife, Joan Robinson Hill. The case ended in a mistrial. Other notable cases included the trial of Harris County Commissioner Bob Eckels, accused of stealing bridge timbers, and David Port, who was indicted for the murder of a Houston letter carrier. After leaving the bench, McMaster continued to practice law, before finally retiring in 1999. He died at his home in La Marque, Texas, on June 23, 2004.
