= Ernie Ernst =

American judge (1924–2013)

Erwin "Ernie" Goree Ernst (July 27, 1924 – July 24, 2013) was an American assistant district attorney, and district judge for Walker County, Texas. During a legal career spanning six decades, Ernst presided over several notable criminal cases, including the 1971 murder trial of John Hill, a Houston-based cosmetic surgeon who was accused of killing his wife.

== Life and career ==
Ernst joined the United States Army Air Force shortly after the Japanese attack on Pearl Harbor, and was part of a crew flying freight across the Pacific during World War II. After the war he enrolled at university where he studied law, and following his graduation he joined the West Texas District Attorney's Office as an assistant district attorney. Later moving to work for the District Attorney's Office of Harris County, Ernst rose there to become Chief Prosecutor, and was the County's first Chief of the Trial Division, with responsibility for a team of over a hundred lawyers.

After spending two decades with the Harris County District Attorney's Office, Ernst was appointed the first general counsel for the Texas Department of Corrections. He was later elected as the District Attorney for Walker County, and subsequently became a judge for the same county. Ernst sat on the bench for a number of years, only retiring following his 85th birthday in 2009. He died in 2013.

Among Ernst's notable cases was as prosecutor in the 1971 trial of John Hill, a Houston-based physician who was accused of poisoning his wife, Joan Robinson Hill.
