= Thomas Thompson (American author) =

American journalist

Thomas Thompson (3 October 1933 – 29 October 1982) was an American journalist and author.

== Career ==
Thompson was born in Fort Worth, Texas, to Clarence Arnold Thompson (1897–1983) and Ruth Oswalt (1904–1983). He graduated from the University of Texas in 1955. He then worked as a reporter and editor at the Houston Press.

Thompson joined Life in 1961 and became an editor and staff writer. While at Life, he covered the JFK assassination and was the first writer to locate Lee Harvey Oswald's home and wife. Among his stories were coverage of the making of Sgt. Pepper's Lonely Hearts Club Band by the Beatles, in which he revealed the group's extensive drug use; an in-depth look at Frank Sinatra and his alleged Mafia ties; and the 40th and 50th birthdays of Elizabeth Taylor.

His book Hearts (1971) concerned the rivalry between Houston surgeons Michael DeBakey and Denton Cooley at the dawn of the heart transplant era. Richie: The Ultimate Tragedy Between One Decent Man and the Son He Loved (1973) was the story of a Long Island man who killed his drug-addicted son. This was made into a TV movie called The Death of Richie.

Thompson's most successful book, Lost! (1975), was his account of the true story of two men and one woman who were lost at sea after a storm in the Pacific. Thompson's Lost! was retold in the made-for-TV movie Lost! in 1986.

Blood and Money (1976) was based on a true story of scandal and the murders of Houston socialite Joan Robinson Hill and her husband John Hill, and the alleged involvement of Mrs. Hill's father, Ash Robinson, a wealthy Texas oil magnate. The book sold four million copies in fourteen languages. There were three lawsuits against Thompson after the book's publication. Ann Kurth, John Hill's second wife, sued Thompson for his description of her as a "sex bomb". Kurth's suit and that of a Longview, Texas, police officer, were both dismissed. Ash Robinson, the father of Joan Robinson Hill, also sued Thompson for his portrayal in the book; Robinson was unsuccessful in his suit against Thompson. Robinson had been allowed to read the book prior to its publication, and initially said he approved of what Thompson had written about him. His only criticism was that he believed the book was too long. Thompson's publishers withheld his royalties until all suits connected with the book were settled.

Thompson also wrote Serpentine (1979), the story of convicted murderer Charles Sobhraj. Thompson wrote one novel, Celebrity (1982), which was on the national best-seller list for six months. That novel became the basis for a five-hour miniseries in 1984.

Thompson received the National Headliner Award for investigative reporting. He was also the 1977 Edgar Award winner for Blood and Money.

Thompson's family believed that the liver disease that caused his death was contracted in the Far East while investigating the Charles Sobhraj saga. When he became ill, Thompson was teaching writing at the University of Southern California. Among his survivors were two sons, Kirk and Scott.
