= Morganna =

American entertainer

- Born: Morganna Roberts; July 4, 1947 (age 79); Louisville, Kentucky, U.S.
- Years active: 1969–1999
- Modeling information
- Height: 5 ft 9 in (1.75 m)
- Hair color: Blonde
- Eye color: Green

Morganna Roberts (born July 4, 1947) is an American entertainer who became known as Morganna or Morganna, the Kissing Bandit in baseball and other sports from 1969 through 1999. She was also billed as "Morganna the Wild One" when appearing as a dancer in the 1980s.

Morganna rushed the field on many occasions and kissed Major League Baseball players including Nolan Ryan, Pete Rose, Johnny Bench, George Brett, Steve Garvey, Roger Clemens, Len Barker and Cal Ripken Jr. She has been described as "baseball's unofficial mascot" and "the grand dame of baseball". She also crashed National Basketball Association games, where Kareem Abdul-Jabbar was one of her most notable victims.

== Early life ==
Morganna Roberts was born in Louisville, Kentucky. She was a baseball fan from a young age, as her grandfather took her to see the Louisville team. She grew up in a poor family; her mother Jane disowned Morganna as a baby, which led to her grandmother Virginia's taking care of Morganna for six years. Morganna was then sent to Mount Mercy Catholic Boarding School just outside Louisville. She initially wanted to be a nun but ran away from the school at age 13, hitchhiking with a friend to Baltimore, where she begged shop owners for a job while living on the street and eating out of garbage cans. She was unable to find work because she was too young to get a work permit.

== Pre-kissing bandit activities ==
After a month, Morganna came across an ad in the window of the Flamingo Club for a "Cigarette Girl or Camera Girl. Must be 18". She told the owner she was 18, but he believed she would find greater success as an exotic dancer. Morganna, unfamiliar with the term, thought "it had something to do with a camel and veils" and agreed. Her first stage appearance went poorly; she encountered difficulty walking in high heels, and as she danced, the men in the audience kept shouting "Take it off". She believed they were heckling to have her removed from the stage, burst into tears and had to be led off by the manager. After watching the other performers, however, she learned quickly and became a popular and successful exotic dancer by the time she was 17. Her act combined stripping with comedy, wearing two 10 gallon cowboy hats on her breasts and impersonating the film critic Gene Shalit. She avoided singing, however, explaining "when I sing, people think the place is being raided."

She attracted particular attention for her mature figure, particularly her large breasts. She gave her measurements as 60–23–39 inches (152–58–99 cm), which she referred to as her "baseball stats". She frequently quipped that Dolly Parton was "flat-chested" compared to her. According to Morganna, by the time she was 12 she could pass for 18. She had to wear I cup bras, costing $50 each and custom-made by a firm in Columbus, Ohio: "People ask me where I get my bras and I always tell them the same people who make my bras made the domes for all the stadiums." She also maintained her strength via aerobics classes to accommodate the weight of her breasts, which she called her "stage props." Nonetheless, she insisted: "I'm not a sex symbol. I'm a comedienne. I make folks smile. I make them laugh – and that makes my day. What are we here for, if not that?"

== Activities as the kissing bandit ==
Her on-field career began in August 1969 when, dared by a friend, she rushed onto Crosley Field in Cincinnati and kissed Reds player Pete Rose. Rose reacted with vulgar language but the following night he tracked her down and apologized with an offering of flowers. She obtained the nickname "the Kissing Bandit" from a Cincinnati sportswriter who announced her arrival with the headline: "Bandit steals kiss from Pete Rose."

Over the following years, Morganna became a familiar sight at baseball fields, basketball courts, and hockey rinks. By 1990, she had kissed 37 Major League Baseball players, 12 National Basketball Association players, and dozens of minor league baseball, basketball, and hockey players, plus various umpires, managers, and owners, and, on one occasion, The San Diego Chicken. She confined herself to kissing them on the cheek, commenting: "It's more sanitary than the lips, and that way their wives don't get upset. Besides, who wants tobacco stains all over your teeth?" On one occasion, three weeks after Morganna had kissed George Brett during a Baltimore Orioles game, Brett marched onto the stage during Morganna's performance and, to the cheers of the crowd, gave her a kiss. Most players enjoyed the running joke; Kelly Tripucka of the Detroit Pistons commented, "It was like hugging a mattress. When I saw her coming at me, I thought it was like a Mack truck. I had two options – either get hit or get out of the way. I decided to get hit."

Her pastime was not without its hazards, however; she was beaten by security guards in Cincinnati, suffered various injuries jumping from stands onto playing fields, and was hit by a pitch in Milwaukee. She was arrested and charged with trespassing nearly 20 times and was jailed briefly in Anaheim, California. She also stood trial in Houston, Texas, where her lawyer used what he called the "gravity defense" to explain her unauthorized presence on the field, arguing: "This woman with a 112-pound (51 kg) body and 15-pound (6.8 kg) chest leaned over the rail to see a foul ball. Gravity took its toll, she fell out on the field, and the rest is history." The judge laughed and dismissed the case. Despite the arrests and fines, her fame earned Morganna millions of dollars.

Morganna's involvement with baseball extended to being the star of her own set of bubblegum cards and becoming the part-owner of a minor league club, the Utica Blue Sox. On one occasion she gave them a pep talk when they were down 15–7 and in last place; they went on to win 40 of the next 54 games. She endorsed the "Morganna Kissing Bandit peanuts" brand from Carolina Fine Snacks, which expected a doubling of its sales as a result. She was featured in a display at the Baseball Hall of Fame, where a picture of her attempting to kiss Frank Howard was put on display. Her popularity with baseball fans grew to the point that minor-league clubs began inviting her to kiss their players as a publicity stunt. The Boise Hawks went further, hiring her to enter the field by bungee jumping from a crane, then persuading CNN to feature her jump as its "play of the day". Her appearances proved to be extremely popular, consistently doubling average attendances.

== Other activities ==
Off the field, Morganna worked as an entertainer, doing comedy and dancing. She worked regularly as an exotic dancer in Houston, Las Vegas, and Oklahoma City, sometimes earning as much as $10,000 a week. She was occasionally hired to publicize events, making personal appearances and giving speeches at places such as car shows and trade conventions. She also dabbled with television, appearing on Johnny Carson and David Letterman's late-night talk shows and occasionally hosting Good Morning, Columbus, a local TV talk show. Morganna appeared as the mystery guest in a 1978 episode of the game show To Tell the Truth.

She appeared in Playboy magazine, in the June 1983, April 1985, and September 1989 issues. During the 1990s, she occasionally kissed minor league players. Her last notable appearance before retirement was in the Farrelly brothers' feature film Kingpin (1996), in which she appeared as herself.

She is the subject of the E:60 biopic documentary, Morganna: The Kissing Bandit, directed by Emmy-winning producer Martin Khodabakhshian, which aired September 26, 2014 on ESPN.

She appeared in an obscure ChoiceMark Corp. VHS tape named "Sports Blooper Mania" in 1989, where she hosted/presented many sports bloopers that had been captured on film; and during the tape, an ongoing storyline developed where the viewer had to keep watching to find out who she would kiss next, as she claimed she was planning to kiss someone at an ongoing ball game, as she is famous for. Morganna ended up kissing Charles Barkley, who, at the time, played for the Philadelphia 76ers. As part of the plotline, she interrupted the game, kissed Barkley, and got arrested afterward.

== Personal life ==
At age 22, Morganna married Bill Cottrell, an accountant from Columbus, Ohio. The two met at a World Series game where he offered to help her with her taxes. Six months later, they got engaged; Morganna joked, "This man is saving you money. Better marry him!"

Prior to marrying Cottrell, Morganna was married to Howard Roberts. She has a son from that marriage, Nick.

== Retirement ==
Morganna retired at the end of 1999 and lives in Ohio. She no longer grants interviews, but made an exception for the 50th anniversary of her first on-field kiss by giving a phone interview with USA Today in 2019 in which she reaffirmed her retirement.
