= Edward Norton filmography =

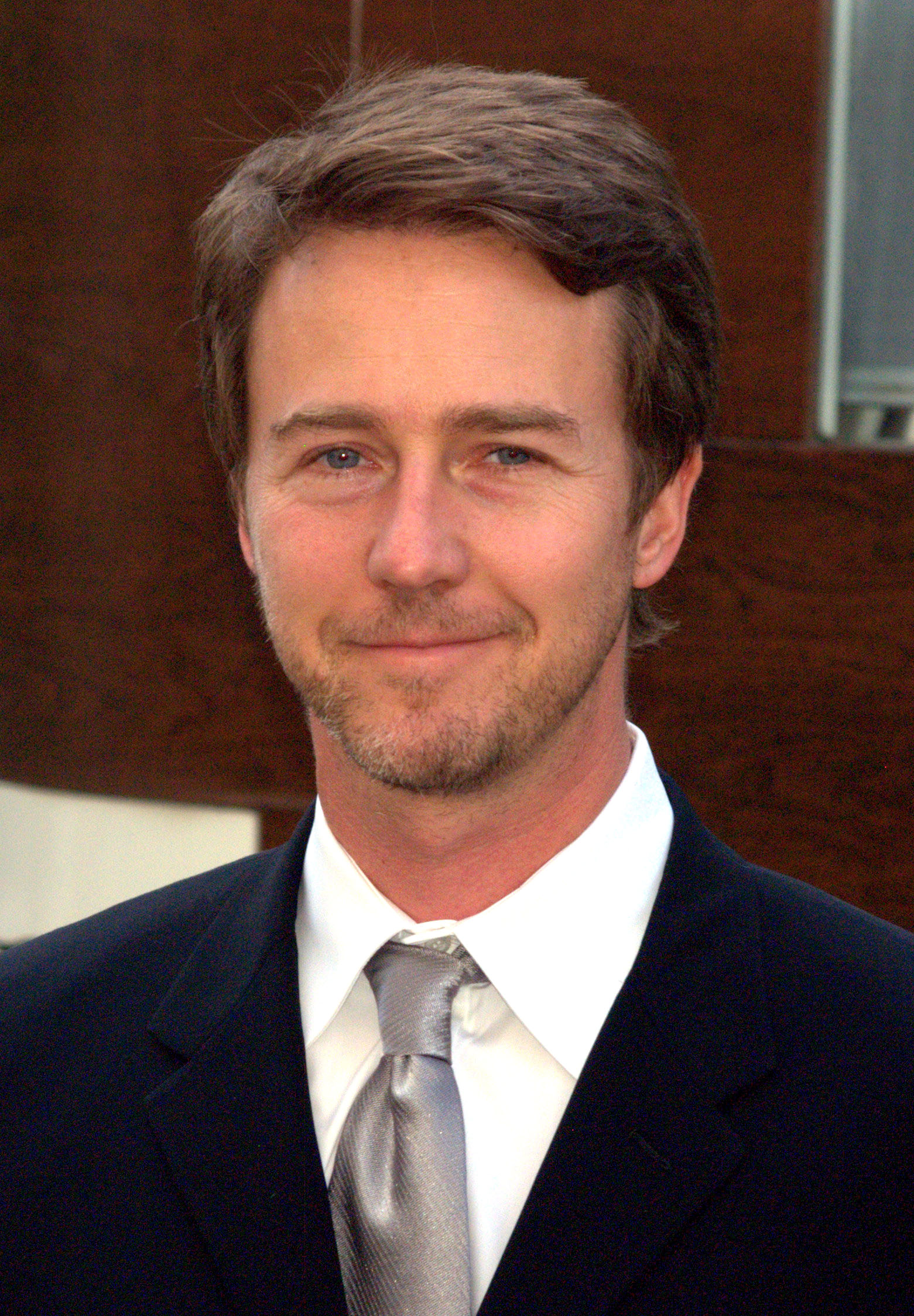
Norton at the premiere of the Metropolitan Opera in September 2009

Edward Norton is an American actor and filmmaker. He made his film debut in the film Primal Fear (1996), for which he earned an Academy Award nomination for Best Supporting Actor and a Golden Globe Award in the same category. In the same year, he starred in two other films, The People vs. Larry Flynt and Everyone Says I Love You. In 1998, Norton featured in American History X, in which he played a neo-Nazi who served three years in prison and ultimately rejected his ideology. His performance was critically lauded and earned him an Academy Award nomination for Best Actor. For the David Fincher-directed film Fight Club (1999), Norton starred in a role that required him to learn boxing, taekwondo and grappling. Though initially fiercely debated by critics, Fight Club gradually received critical reappraisal and earned its status as a cult film.

Norton had his directorial debut with the romantic comedy Keeping the Faith (2000), in which he also starred as a main role. He later played Will Graham, an FBI agent in the film Red Dragon (2002), which received mixed critical reviews but was commercially successful. Controversies surrounded Norton's role and participation in the superhero film The Incredible Hulk (2008), for which he rewrote the script every day but without credit. The film was a critical success compared to its 2003 predecessor, but Norton refused to reprise his role for the film The Avengers (2012) and all following Marvel Cinematic Universe (MCU) projects, allegedly due to conflicts between him and other producers. Norton also handled production for several films, including the documentary By the People: The Election of Barack Obama (2010) and romantic comedy Thanks for Sharing (2012). In 2014, he starred in two Academy Award-nominated films, The Grand Budapest Hotel and Birdman. For the latter role, he earned his second Academy Award nomination for Best Supporting Actor, and his third nomination overall.

== Film ==
Year	Title	Role	Notes	Ref.
1996	Primal Fear	Aaron Stampler / Roy		
1996	The People vs. Larry Flynt	Alan Isaacman		
1996	Everyone Says I Love You	Holden Spence		
1998	Rounders	Lester "Worm" Murphy		
1998	American History X	Derek Vinyard		
1998	Out of the Past	Henry Gerber		
1999	Fight Club	The Narrator		
2000	Keeping the Faith	Father Brian Finn	Also producer and director	
2001	The Score	Jack Teller		
2002	Death to Smoochy	Sheldon Mopes / Smoochy the Rhino		
2002	Frida	Nelson Rockefeller	Also uncredited screenwriter	
2002	Red Dragon	Will Graham		
2002	25th Hour	Monty Brogan	Also uncredited producer	
2003	The Italian Job	Steve Frazelli		
2004	Dirty Work	—N/a	Executive producer only	
2004	After the Sunset	Himself	Uncredited	
2005	Kingdom of Heaven	King Baldwin IV		
2005	Down in the Valley	Harlan Fairfax Carruthers	Also producer	
2006	The Illusionist	Eisenheim		
2006	The Painted Veil	Walter Fane	Also producer	
2007	Brando	Himself	Documentary	
2007	The Simpsons Movie	Panicky Man (voice)	Lines redubbed by Dan Castellaneta	
2007	Man from Plains	Himself	Documentary	
2008	The Incredible Hulk	Bruce Banner / Hulk	Also uncredited screenwriter	
2008	Pride and Glory	Ray Tierney		
2008	Bustin' Down the Door	Narrator (voice)	Documentary	
2009	By the People: The Election of Barack Obama	—N/a	Producer only	
2009	The Invention of Lying	Cop	Cameo	
2010	Leaves of Grass	Bill Kincaid / Brady Kincaid	Also producer	
2010	Stone	Gerald "Stone" Creeson		
2012	Moonrise Kingdom	Scout Master Randy Ward		
2012	The Dictator	Himself	Uncredited	
2012	The Bourne Legacy	Eric Byer		
2012	Thanks for Sharing	—N/a	Executive producer only	
2013	Salinger	Himself	Documentary	
2014	My Own Man	Himself	Documentary	
2014	The Grand Budapest Hotel	Henckels		
2014	Birdman or (The Unexpected Virtue of Ignorance)	Mike Shiner		
2016	Sausage Party	Sammy Bagel Jr. (voice)		
2016	Collateral Beauty	Whit Yardsham		
2017	The Guardian Brothers	Yu Lei (voice)	English dub	
2018	Isle of Dogs	Rex (voice)		
2018	Gotti	—N/a	Executive producer only	
2019	Alita: Battle Angel	Nova	Uncredited cameo	
2019	Motherless Brooklyn	Lionel Essrog	Also writer, producer and director	
2021	The French Dispatch	The Chauffeur		
2022	High Noon on the Waterfront	Carl Foreman (voice)	Short film	
2022	Glass Onion: A Knives Out Mystery	Miles Bron		
2023	Asteroid City	Conrad Earp		
2024	A Complete Unknown	Pete Seeger	Also performed two songs which were featured in the film's soundtrack	
2025	The Tiger	Colin	Short film	
2026	The Invite	Howard “Hawk” Kelly		
TBA	Porto Rico		Filming	

Key
†	Denotes films that have not yet been released

== Television ==
Year	Title	Role	Notes
2000, 2013	The Simpsons	Devon Bradley (voice) Reverend Elijah Hooper (voice)	Episode: "The Great Money Caper" and Episode: "Pulpit Friction"
2005	Stella	Himself	Episode: "Pilot"
2009	Modern Family	Izzy LaFontaine	Episode: "Great Expectations"
2013	Saturday Night Live	Host / Owen Wilson	Episode: "Edward Norton/Janelle Monáe"
2015	Saturday Night Live 40th Anniversary Special	Himself / Stefon	TV special
2015	Last Week Tonight with John Oliver	Himself	Episode: "Infrastructure"
2018	The Comedy Central Roast	Himself	Episode: "Bruce Willis"
2018	Ask the StoryBots	Gary the Electronics Salesman	Episode: "What Is Electricity?"
2023	Extrapolations	Jonathan Chopin	2 episodes
2024	Sausage Party: Foodtopia	Sammy Bagel Jr. (voice)	8 episodes
2025	The American Revolution	Benjamin Rush (voice)	TV documentary

== Video games ==
Year	Title	Voice role
2008	The Incredible Hulk	Bruce Banner / Hulk

== Music videos ==
Year	Song title	Artist	Role
2013	"Spring Break Anthem"	The Lonely Island	Himself

== See also ==
- List of awards and nominations received by Edward Norton
