= List of awards and nominations received by Edward Norton =

Edward Norton awards and nominations
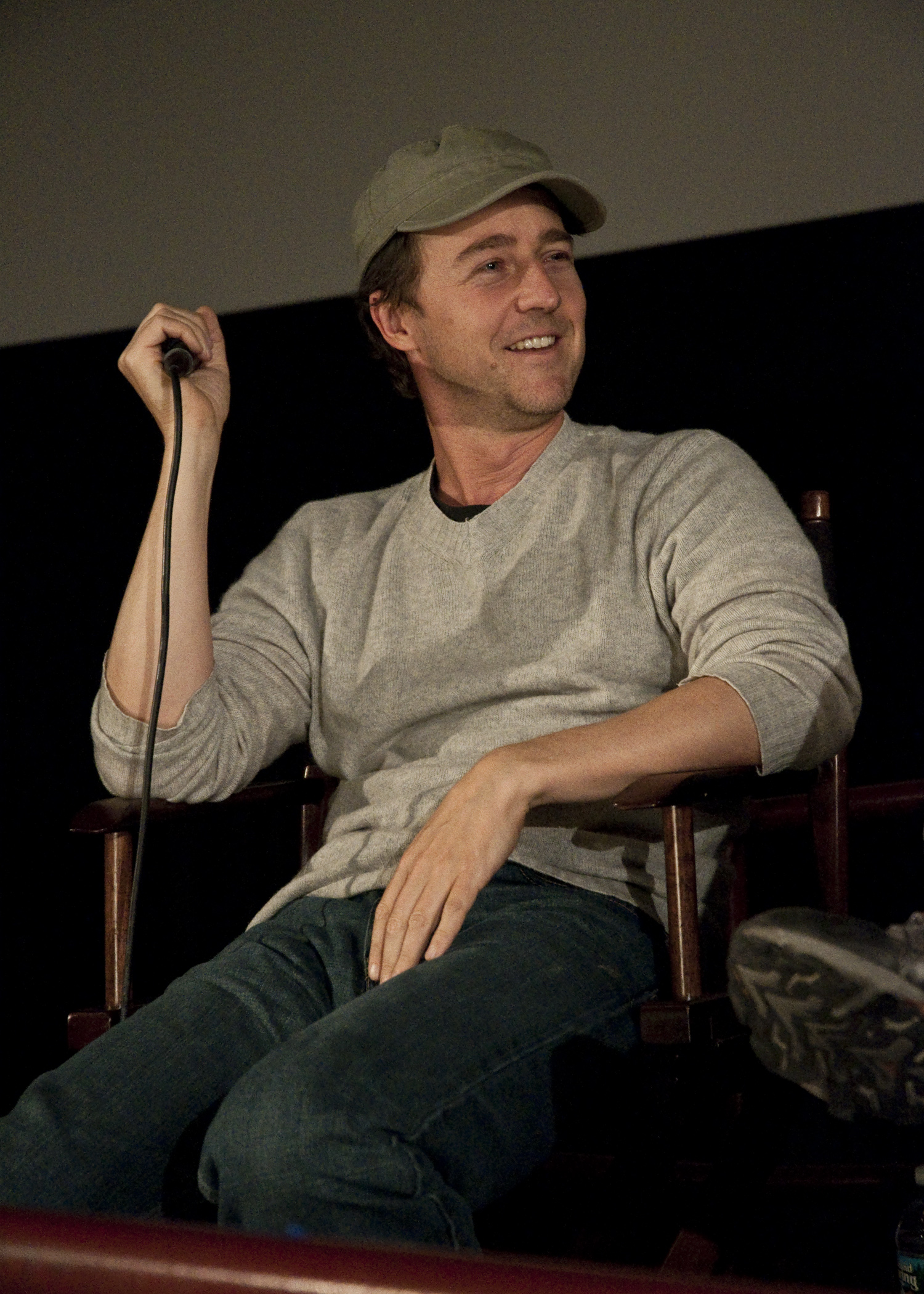
- Norton in 2010
Awards and nominations
Award	Wins	Nominations
Academy Awards	0	4
British Academy Film Awards	0	3
Emmy Awards	0	2
Golden Globe Awards	1	3
Screen Actors Guild Awards	1	5

Totals (Note: Certain award groups do not simply award one winner. They acknowledge several different recipients, have runners-up, and have third place. Since this is a specific recognition and is different from losing an award, runner-up mentions are considered wins in this award tally. For simplification and to avoid errors, each award in this list has been presumed to have had a prior nomination.)
- Wins: 24
- Nominations: 121

Actor Edward Norton has received various accolades, including a Golden Globe Award and a Screen Actors Guild Award, as well as nominations for four Academy Awards, two BAFTA Awards, and two Emmy Awards.

Norton has been nominated for four Academy Awards for his performances as a murder suspect in Primal Fear (1996), a neo-Nazi leader in American History X (1998), an egotistical actor in Birdman (2014), and singer-songwriter Pete Seeger in A Complete Unknown (2024). He won the Golden Globe Award for Best Supporting Actor – Motion Picture for his role in Primal Fear (1996) and was Globe-nominated for Birdman (2014) and A Complete Unknown (2024). He won the Screen Actors Guild Award for Outstanding Cast in a Motion Picture with the ensemble of the Wes Anderson comedy The Grand Budapest Hotel (2014).

For his work on television, he received a Primetime Emmy Award for Outstanding Documentary or Nonfiction Special nomination for the HBO documentary By the People: The Election of Barack Obama (2009). He was also nominated for the Daytime Emmy Award for Outstanding Performer in Children's Programming for the Netflix animated children's program Ask the StoryBots (2019).

== Major associations ==
=== Academy Awards ===
Year (Note: Year in which award ceremony was held.)	Category	Nominated work	Result	Ref.
1997	Best Supporting Actor	Primal Fear	Nominated	
1999	Best Actor	American History X	Nominated	
2015	Best Supporting Actor	Birdman or (The Unexpected Virtue of Ignorance)	Nominated	
2025	Best Supporting Actor	A Complete Unknown	Nominated	

=== BAFTA Awards ===
Year	Category	Nominated work	Result	Ref.
1997	Best Actor in a Supporting Role	Primal Fear	Nominated	
2015	Best Actor in a Supporting Role	Birdman or (The Unexpected Virtue of Ignorance)	Nominated	
2025	Best Actor in a Supporting Role	A Complete Unknown	Nominated	

=== Critics' Choice Awards ===
Year	Category	Nominated work	Result	Ref.
2013	Best Acting Ensemble	Moonrise Kingdom	Nominated	
2015	Best Acting Ensemble	The Grand Budapest Hotel	Nominated	
2015	Best Acting Ensemble	Birdman or (The Unexpected Virtue of Ignorance)	Won	
2015	Best Supporting Actor	Birdman or (The Unexpected Virtue of Ignorance)	Nominated	
2023	Best Acting Ensemble	Glass Onion: A Knives Out Mystery	Won	
2025	Best Supporting Actor	A Complete Unknown	Nominated	

=== Emmy Awards ===
Year	Category	Nominated work	Result	Ref.
Primetime Emmy Awards
2010	Outstanding Nonfiction Special	By the People: The Election of Barack Obama	Nominated	
Daytime Emmy Award
2019	Outstanding Performer in a Children's Program	Ask the StoryBots (episode: "What Is Electricity?")	Nominated	

=== Golden Globe Awards ===
Year	Category	Nominated work	Result	Ref.
1997	Best Supporting Actor – Motion Picture	Primal Fear	Won	
2015	Best Supporting Actor – Motion Picture	Birdman or (The Unexpected Virtue of Ignorance)	Nominated	
2025	Best Supporting Actor – Motion Picture	A Complete Unknown	Nominated	

=== Screen Actors Guild Awards ===
Year	Category	Nominated work	Result	Ref.
2015	Outstanding Actor in a Supporting Role	Birdman or (The Unexpected Virtue of Ignorance)	Nominated	
2015	Outstanding Cast in a Motion Picture	Birdman or (The Unexpected Virtue of Ignorance)	Won	
2015	Outstanding Cast in a Motion Picture	The Grand Budapest Hotel	Nominated	
2025	Outstanding Cast in a Motion Picture	A Complete Unknown	Nominated	
2025	Outstanding Actor in a Supporting Role	A Complete Unknown	Nominated	

== Miscellaneous awards ==
=== AACTA International Awards ===
Year	Category	Nominated work	Result	Ref.
2015	Best Supporting Actor	Birdman or (The Unexpected Virtue of Ignorance)	Nominated	

=== Boston Society of Film Critics ===
Year	Category	Nominated work	Result	Ref.
1996	Best Supporting Actor	Primal Fear	Won	
1996	Best Supporting Actor	Everyone Says I Love You	Won	
1996	Best Supporting Actor	The People vs. Larry Flynt	Won	
2024	Best Supporting Actor	A Complete Unknown	Won	

=== Chicago Film Critics Association ===
Year	Category	Nominated work	Result	Ref.
1997	Most Promising Actor	Everyone Says I Love You	Won	
1997	Most Promising Actor	Primal Fear	Won	
1997	Best Supporting Actor	Primal Fear	Nominated	
2014	Best Supporting Actor	Birdman or (The Unexpected Virtue of Ignorance)	Nominated	

=== Detroit Film Critics Society ===
Year	Category	Nominated work	Result	Ref.
2014	Best Ensemble	Birdman or (The Unexpected Virtue of Ignorance)	Nominated	
2014	Best Supporting Actor	Birdman or (The Unexpected Virtue of Ignorance)	Nominated	

=== Florida Film Critics Circle ===
Year	Category	Nominated work	Result	Ref.
1996	Best Supporting Actor	Everyone Says I Love You	Won	
1996	Best Supporting Actor	Primal Fear	Won	
1996	Best Supporting Actor	The People vs. Larry Flynt	Won	

=== Gotham Awards ===
Year	Category	Nominated work	Result	Ref.
2012	Best Ensemble Cast	Moonrise Kingdom	Nominated	

=== Houston Film Critics Society ===
Year	Category	Nominated work	Result	Ref.
2015	Best Supporting Actor	Birdman or (The Unexpected Virtue of Ignorance)	Nominated	

=== Independent Spirit Awards ===
Year	Category	Nominated work	Result	Ref.
2007	Best Lead Male	The Painted Veil	Nominated	
2015	Best Supporting Male	Birdman or (The Unexpected Virtue of Ignorance)	Nominated	

=== London Film Critics' Circle ===
Year	Category	Nominated work	Result	Ref.
2015	Supporting Actor of the Year	Birdman or (The Unexpected Virtue of Ignorance)	Nominated	

=== Los Angeles Film Critics Association ===
Year	Category	Nominated work	Result	Ref.
1996	Best Supporting Actor	Primal Fear	Won	
1996	Best Supporting Actor	Everyone Says I Love You	Won	
1996	Best Supporting Actor	The People vs. Larry Flynt	Won	

=== MTV Movie & TV Awards ===
Year	Category	Nominated work	Result	Ref.
1997	Best Villain	Primal Fear	Nominated	
2000	Best Fight	Fight Club	Nominated	

=== National Board of Review ===
Year	Category	Nominated work	Result	Ref.
1997	Best Supporting Actor	Everyone Says I Love You	Won	
2014	Best Supporting Actor	Birdman or (The Unexpected Virtue of Ignorance)	Won	

=== Online Film Critics Society ===
Year	Category	Nominated work	Result	Ref.
1999	Best Actor	American History X	Nominated	
2000	Best Actor	Fight Club	Nominated	
2014	Best Supporting Actor	Birdman	Won	

=== San Diego Film Critics Society ===
Year	Category	Nominated work	Result	Ref.
2014	Best Performance by an Ensemble	The Grand Budapest Hotel	Nominated	
2014	Best Performance by an Ensemble	Birdman or (The Unexpected Virtue of Ignorance)	Won	
2014	Best Supporting Actor	Birdman or (The Unexpected Virtue of Ignorance)	Nominated	

=== San Francisco Film Critics Circle ===
Year	Category	Nominated work	Result	Ref.
2014	Best Supporting Actor	Birdman or (The Unexpected Virtue of Ignorance)	Won	

=== Satellite Awards ===
Year	Category	Nominated work	Result	Ref.
1999	Best Actor – Drama	American History X	Won	
2001	Best Actor – Comedy or Musical	Keeping the Faith	Nominated	
2003	Best Actor – Drama	25th Hour	Nominated	
2005	Best Supporting Actor – Motion Picture	Kingdom of Heaven	Nominated	
2015	Best Supporting Actor – Motion Picture	Birdman or (The Unexpected Virtue of Ignorance)	Nominated	
2020	Auteur Award	Motherless Brooklyn	Won	
2020	Best Adapted Screenplay	Motherless Brooklyn	Nominated	

=== Saturn Awards ===
Year	Category	Nominated work	Result	Ref.
1997	Best Supporting Actor	Primal Fear	Nominated	
1999	Best Actor	American History X	Nominated	

=== Society of Texas Film Critics ===
Year	Category	Nominated work	Result	Ref.
1996	Best Supporting Actor	Primal Fear	Won	
1996	Best Supporting Actor	The People vs. Larry Flynt	Won	

=== St. Louis Gateway Film Critics Association ===
Year	Category	Nominated work	Result	Ref.
2007	Best Actor	The Painted Veil	Nominated	
2014	Best Supporting Actor	Birdman or (The Unexpected Virtue of Ignorance)	Nominated	

=== Vancouver Film Critics Circle ===
Year	Category	Nominated work	Result	Ref.
2015	Best Supporting Actor	Birdman or (The Unexpected Virtue of Ignorance)	Nominated	

=== Washington D.C. Area Film Critics Association ===
Year	Category	Nominated work	Result	Ref.
2014	Best Ensemble	Birdman or (The Unexpected Virtue of Ignorance)	Nominated	
2014	Best Supporting Actor	Birdman or (The Unexpected Virtue of Ignorance)	Nominated	
