= 62nd Primetime Creative Arts Emmy Awards =

2010 American television programming awards

- Date: August 21, 2010
- Location: Nokia Theatre; Los Angeles, California
- Presented by: Academy of Television Arts & Sciences
- Most awards: The Pacific (7)
- Most nominations: The Pacific (19)

Television/radio coverage
- Network: E!

The 62nd Annual Primetime Creative Arts Emmy Awards ceremony was held on August 21, 2010 at the Nokia Theatre in Downtown Los Angeles. This was in conjunction with the annual Primetime Emmy Awards and was presented in recognition of technical and other similar achievements in American television programming. E! aired clips from the ceremony on August 28, the evening preceding the night of the primetime telecast.

== Winners and nominees ==
Winners are listed first and highlighted in bold:

=== Programs ===
Programs
**Outstanding Reality Program**: **Jamie Oliver's Food Revolution (ABC)**; Antiques Roadshow (PBS); Dirty Jobs (Discovery Channel); Kathy Griffin: My Life on the D-List (Bravo); MythBusters (Discovery Channel); Undercover Boss (CBS)	**Exceptional Merit in Nonfiction Filmmaking**: **The Betrayal – Nerakhoon (PBS)**; Brick City (Sundance Channel); My Lai (PBS); Patti Smith: Dream of Life (PBS); Pressure Cooker (BET); Sergio (HBO)
**Outstanding Nonfiction Series**: **The National Parks: America's Best Idea (PBS)**; Monty Python: Almost the Truth (Lawyers Cut) (IFC); Life (Discovery Channel); American Experience (PBS); Deadliest Catch (Discovery Channel); American Masters (PBS)	**Outstanding Nonfiction Special**: **Teddy: In His Own Words (HBO)**; Believe: The Eddie Izzard Story (Epix); By the People: The Election of Barack Obama (HBO); Johnny Mercer: The Dream's on Me (TMC); Saturday Night Live in the 2000s: Time and Again (NBC); The Simpsons 20th Anniversary Special – In 3-D! On Ice! (Fox)
**Outstanding Animated Program**: **Prep & Landing (ABC)**; Alien Earths (Nat Geo); South Park (Episode: "200/201") (Comedy Central); The Ricky Gervais Show (Episode: "Knob At Night") (HBO); The Simpsons (Episode: "Once Upon a Time in Springfield") (Fox)	**Outstanding Short-Format Animated Program**: **Robot Chicken (Episode: Full-Assed Christmas Special) (Adult Swim)**; Adventure Time (Episode: "My Two Favorite People") (Cartoon Network); Chowder (Episode: "The Toots") (Cartoon Network); Kick Buttowski: Suburban Daredevil (Episode: "Racing The Schoolbus") (Disney XD); The Marvelous Misadventures of Flapjack (Episode: "Tee Hee Tummy Tums") (Cartoon Network); Uncle Grandpa (Cartoon Network)
**Outstanding Children's Program**: **Wizards of Waverly Place: The Movie (Disney Channel)**; Hannah Montana (Disney Channel); iCarly (Nickelodeon); Jonas (Disney Channel); Wizards of Waverly Place (Disney Channel)	**Outstanding Children's Nonfiction, Reality, or Reality-Competition Program**: **Nick News with Linda Ellerbee: The Face of Courage: Kids Living with Cancer (Nickelodeon)**; When Families Grieve (PBS)
**Outstanding Special Class Program**: **63rd Tony Awards (CBS)**; 30 Rock: The Webisodes (NBC.com); 82nd Academy Awards (ABC); ABC's LOST Presents: Mysteries of the Universe – The Dharma Initiative (abc.com/lost); The Daily Show: Ask a Correspondent (thedailyshow.com); Avatar: Enter The World of Pandora (HBO First Look) (HBO); Vancouver 2010 Olympic Winter Games Opening Ceremony (NBC)

=== Acting ===
Acting
**Outstanding Guest Actor in a Comedy Series**: **Neil Patrick Harris as Bryan Ryan on Glee (Episode: "Dream On") (Fox)**; Will Arnett as Devon Banks on 30 Rock (Episode: "Into the Crevasse") (NBC); Jon Hamm as Dr. Drew Baird on 30 Rock (Episode: "Emanuelle Goes to Dinosaur Land") (NBC); Mike O'Malley as Burt Hummel on Glee (Episode: "Wheels") (Fox); Eli Wallach as Bernard Zimberg on Nurse Jackie (Episode: "Chicken Soup") (Showtime); Fred Willard as Frank Dunphy on Modern Family (Episode: "Travels with Scout") (ABC)	**Outstanding Guest Actress in a Comedy Series**: **Betty White as Various Characters on Saturday Night Live (Episode: "Host: Betty White") (NBC)**; Christine Baranski as Dr. Beverly Hofstadter on The Big Bang Theory (Episode: "The Maternal Congruence") (CBS); Kristin Chenoweth as April Rhodes on Glee (Episode: "The Rhodes Not Taken") (Fox); Tina Fey as Various Characters on Saturday Night Live (Episode: "Host: Tina Fey") (NBC); Kathryn Joosten as Karen McCluskey on Desperate Housewives (Episode: "The Chase") (ABC); Jane Lynch as Dr. Linda Freeman on Two and a Half Men (Episode: "818-jklpuzo") (CBS); Elaine Stritch as Colleen Donaghy on 30 Rock (Episode: "The Moms") (NBC)
**Outstanding Guest Actor in a Drama Series**: **John Lithgow as Arthur Mitchell on Dexter (Episode: "Road Kill") (Showtime)**; Dylan Baker as Colin Sweeney on The Good Wife (Episode: "Bad") (CBS); Beau Bridges as George Andrews on The Closer (Episode: "Make Over") (TNT); Alan Cumming as Eli Gold on The Good Wife (Episode: "Fleas") (CBS); Ted Danson as Arthur Frobisher on Damages (Episode: "The Next One's Gonna Go in Your Throat") (FX); Gregory Itzin as Charles Logan on 24 (Episode: "1:00 p.m. – 2:00 p.m.") (Fox); Robert Morse as Bert Cooper on Mad Men (Episode: "Shut the Door. Have a Seat.") (AMC)	**Outstanding Guest Actress in a Drama Series**: **Ann-Margret as Rita Wills on Law & Order: Special Victims Unit (Episode: "Bedtime") (NBC)**; Shirley Jones as Lola Zellman on The Cleaner (Episode: "Does Everybody Have A Drink?") (A&E); Elizabeth Mitchell as Dr. Juliet Burke on Lost (Episode: "The End") (ABC); Mary Kay Place as Adaleen Grant on Big Love (Episode: "The Mighty and Strong") (HBO); Sissy Spacek as Marilyn Densham on Big Love (Episode: "End of Days") (HBO); Lily Tomlin as Marilyn Tobin on Damages (Episode: "Your Secrets Are Safe") (FX)
**Outstanding Voice-Over Performance**: **Anne Hathaway as Princess Penelope on The Simpsons (Episode: "Once Upon a Time in Springfield") (Fox)**; Hank Azaria as Apu Nahasapeemapetilon and Moe Szyslak on The Simpsons (Episode: "Moe Letter Blues") (Fox); H. Jon Benjamin as Sterling Archer on Archer (Episode: "Mole Hunt") (FX); Dan Castellaneta as Grampa Simpson and Homer Simpson on The Simpsons (Episode: "Thursdays with Abie") (Fox); Dave Foley as Wayne on Prep & Landing (ABC); Seth Green as Cobra Commander, Movie Narrator, and Robot Chicken Nerd on Robot Chicken (Episode: "Cannot Be Erased, So Sorry") (Adult Swim)

=== Animation ===
Animation
**Outstanding Individual Achievement in Animation (Juried)**
- **Prep & Landing – Andy Harkness (art director) (ABC)**
- **Prep & Landing – William M. George III (background key design) (ABC)**
- **Prep & Landing – Joe Mateo (storyboard artist) (ABC)**
- **Family Guy – Greg Colton (storyboard artist) (Episode: "Road to the Multiverse") (Fox)**
- **Generator Rex – Nora Murphy-Berden and Chu-Hui Song (background painter) (Episode: "The Day That Everything Changed") (Cartoon Network)**
- **Heart of Stone – Chris Do (art director) (VEVO.com)**
- **The Ricky Gervais Show – Andy Bialk (character design) (Episode: "Charity") (HBO)**
- **The Simpsons – Charles Ragins (background design) (Episode: "Postcards from the Wedge") (Fox)**

=== Art Direction ===
Art Direction
**Outstanding Art Direction for a Multi-Camera Series**: **No winner**; Hell's Kitchen (Episodes: "Episode 615") (Fox); How I Met Your Mother (Episodes: "Duel Citizenship", "Of Course", "Hooked") (CBS); Rules of Engagement (Episodes: "3rd Wheel", "Ghost Story", "Atlantic City") (CBS); The Big Bang Theory (Episode: "The Gothowitz Deviation", "The Adhesive Duck Deficiency") (CBS); The New Adventures of Old Christine (Episode: "Subway", "Somehow", "Revenge Makeover", "Sweet Charity") (CBS)	**Outstanding Art Direction for a Single-Camera Series**: **The Tudors (Episode: "Episode #407") (Showtime)**; Glee (Episode: "Pilot") (Fox); Heroes (Episode: "Brave New World") (NBC); Lost (Episode: "Ab Aeterno") (ABC); Modern Family (Episode: "Moon Landing") (ABC); True Blood (Episode: "Never Let Me Go") (HBO)
**Outstanding Art Direction for a Miniseries or Movie**: **The Pacific (HBO)**; Georgia O'Keeffe (Lifetime); Return to Cranford (PBS); Temple Grandin (HBO); You Don't Know Jack (HBO)	**Outstanding Art Direction for Variety or Nonfiction Programming**: **82nd Academy Awards (ABC)**; 63rd Tony Awards (CBS); American Idol (Episode: "Idol Gives Back") (Fox); The Tonight Show with Conan O'Brien (Episode: "#1.1") (NBC); The Who Super Bowl Halftime Show (CBS); Saturday Night Live (Episode: "Host: Jon Hamm, Host: Betty White") (NBC)

=== Casting ===
Casting
**Outstanding Casting for a Comedy Series**: **Modern Family – Jeff Greenberg (ABC)**; 30 Rock – Jennifer McNamara-Shroff (NBC); Glee – Robert J. Ulrich and Eric Dawson and Jim Carnahan (Fox); Nurse Jackie – Julie Tucker and Ross Meyerson (Showtime); United States of Tara – Cami Patton and Jennifer Lare (Showtime)	**Outstanding Casting for a Drama Series**: **Mad Men – Laura Schiff and Carrie Audino (AMC)**; Big Love – Libby Goldstein, Junie Lowry-Johnson and Lisa Soltau (HBO); Dexter – Shawn Dawson (Showtime); Friday Night Lights – Linda Lowy, John Brace and Beth Sepko (NBC); The Good Wife – Mark Saks (CBS); True Blood – Junie Lowry-Johnson and Libby Goldstein (HBO)
**Outstanding Casting for a Miniseries, Movie, or Special**: **The Pacific – Meg Liberman and Cami Patton, Christine King, Jennifer Euston and Suzanne Smith (HBO)**; Emma – Gemma Hancock and Sam Stevenson (PBS); Georgia O'Keeffe – David Rubin, Richard Hicks and Angelique Midthunder (Lifetime); Temple Grandin – David Rubin, Richard Hicks and Beth Sepko (HBO); You Don't Know Jack – Ellen Chenoweth (HBO)

=== Choreography ===
Choreography
**Outstanding Choreography**
- **Mia Michaels – So You Think You Can Dance (Routines: "Gravity", "Addiction & Koop Island Blues & One") (Fox)**
  - Adam Shankman – 82nd Academy Awards (Routines: "Opening Number", "No One Wants to Do It Alone & Score Suite") (ABC)
  - Derek Hough – Dancing with the Stars (Routines: "Futuristic Paso Doble", "Living On Video & Quickstep", "Anything Goes'") (ABC)
  - Chelsie Hightower and Derek Hough – Dancing with the Stars (Routines: "Paso Doble", "Malaquena") (ABC)
  - Stacey Tookey – So You Think You Can Dance (Routines: "Fear") (Fox)

=== Cinematography ===
Cinematography
**Outstanding Cinematography for a Single-Camera Series (One Hour)**: **CSI: Crime Scene Investigation (Episode: "Family Affair") (CBS)**; Breaking Bad (Episode: "No Mas") (AMC); FlashForward (Episode: "No More Good Days") (ABC); Mad Men (Episode: "Shut the Door. Have a Seat.") (AMC); The Tudors (Episode: "Death of a Monarchy") (Showtime)	**Outstanding Cinematography for a Half-Hour Series**: **Weeds (Episode: "A Modest Proposal") (Showtime)**; 30 Rock (Episode: "Season Four") (NBC); Gary Unmarried (Episode: "Gary Shoots Fish in a Barrel") (CBS); Hung (Episodes: "Pilot") (HBO); Nurse Jackie (Episode: "Apple Bong") (Showtime); Two and a Half Men (Episode: "Crude and Uncalled For") (CBS)
**Outstanding Cinematography for a Miniseries or Movie**: **Return to Cranford (Episode: "Part 2") (PBS)**; The Pacific (Episode: "Peleliu Landing") (HBO); The Pacific (Episode: "Okinawa") (HBO); The Prisoner (Episode: "Checkmate") (AMC); You Don't Know Jack (HBO)	**Outstanding Cinematography for Nonfiction Programming**: **Life (Episode: "Challenges of Life") (Discovery Channel)**; America: The Story of Us (Episode: "Division") (History Channel); Deadliest Catch (Episode: No Second Chances) (Discovery Channel); The National Parks: America's Best Idea (Episode: The Scripture of Nature) (PBS); Whale Wars (Episode: "The Stuff of Nightmares") (Animal Planet)
**Outstanding Cinematography for Reality Programming**: **Survivor (Episode: "Slay Everyone, Trust No One") (CBS)**; Dirty Jobs (Episode: "High Rise Window Washer") (Discovery Channel); Man vs. Wild (Episode: "Big Sky Country") (Discovery Channel); The Amazing Race (Episode: "I Think We're Fighting The Germans, Right?") (CBS); Top Chef (Episode: "Vivre Las Vegas") (Bravo); Top Chef Masters (Episode: Masters Get Schooled) (Bravo)

=== Commercial ===
Commercial
**Outstanding Commercial**
- **"The Man Your Man Could Smell Like" (Old Spice Body Wash)**
  - "Anthem" (Absolut)
  - "Coke Finals" (Coca-Cola)
  - "Game" (Mars Snack Food US/Snickers)
  - "Green Car" (Audi)
  - "Human Chain" (Nike)

=== Costuming ===
Costuming
**Outstanding Costumes for a Series**: **The Tudors (Episode: "Episode #408") (Showtime)**; 30 Rock (Episode: "I Do Do") (NBC); Glee (Episode: "The Power of Madonna") (Fox); The Good Wife (Episode: "Crash") (CBS); Mad Men (Episode: "Souvenir") (AMC)	**Outstanding Costumes for a Miniseries, Movie, or Special**: **Return to Cranford (Episode: "Part One") (PBS)**; Emma (Episode: "Part Two") (PBS); Georgia O'Keeffe (Lifetime); The Pacific (Episode: "Melbourne") (HBO); You Don't Know Jack (HBO)
**Outstanding Costumes for a Variety, Music Program, or Special**: **Jimmy Kimmel Live! (Episode: "Episode 09-1266") (ABC) (TIE)**; **So You Think You Can Dance (Episode: "Top 12 Perform") (Fox) (TIE)**; **Titan Maximum (Episode: "Went To Party, Got Crabs") (Cartoon Network) (TIE)**

=== Directing ===
Directing
**Outstanding Directing for Nonfiction Programming**: **Barak Goodman for American Experience (Episode: "My Lai" (PBS)**; Amy Rice and Alicia Sams for By the People: The Election of Barack Obama (HBO); Bill Jones and Ben Timlett for Monty Python: Almost the Truth (Lawyers Cut) (Episodes: "Lust for Glory") (IFC); Dan Reed for Terror in Mumbai (HBO); Bertram van Munster for The Amazing Race (Episode: "I Think We're Fighting the Germans, Right?" (CBS)	**Outstanding Directing for a Variety, Music or Comedy Series**: **Don Roy King for Saturday Night Live (NBC)**; Jerry Foley for Late Show with David Letterman (CBS); James Hoskinson for The Colbert Report (Comedy Central); Allan Kartun for The Tonight Show with Conan O'Brien (NBC); Chuck O'Neil for The Daily Show with Jon Stewart (Comedy Central)

=== Hairstyling ===
Hairstyling
**Outstanding Hairstyling for a Single-Camera Series**: **Mad Men (Episode: "Souvenir") (AMC)**; Castle (Episode: "Vampire Weekend") (ABC); Glee (Episode: "Hairography") (Fox); Glee (Episode: "The Power of Madonna") (Fox); The Tudors (Episode: "Episode 407") (Showtime); Tracey Ullman's State of The Union (Episode: "Episode 301") (Showtime)	**Outstanding Hairstyling for a Multi-Camera Series or Special**: **Dancing with the Stars (Episode: "Episode 902A") (ABC)**; 82nd Academy Awards (ABC); How I Met Your Mother (Episode; "Dopplegangers") (CBS); Two and a Half Men (Episode: "That's Why They Call It Ballroom") (CBS); Saturday Night Live (Episode: "Host: Betty White") (NBC)
**Outstanding Hairstyling for a Miniseries or Movie**: **Emma (PBS)**; Georgia O'Keeffe (Lifetime); Return to Cranford (PBS); Temple Grandin (HBO); You Don't Know Jack (HBO)

=== Hosting ===
Hosting
**Outstanding Host for a Reality or Reality-Competition Program**
- **Jeff Probst for Survivor (CBS)**
  - Tom Bergeron for Dancing with the Stars (ABC)
  - Phil Keoghan for The Amazing Race (CBS)
  - Heidi Klum for Project Runway (Bravo)
  - Ryan Seacrest for American Idol (Fox)

=== Interactive Media ===
Interactive Media
**Outstanding Creative Achievement in Interactive Media – Fiction**: **Star Wars: Uncut (StarWarsUncut.com)**; Dexter Interactive (Showtime.com); Glee Hyperpromo And Superfan (Fox.com)	**Outstanding Creative Achievement in Interactive Media – Nonfiction**: **The Jimmy Fallon Digital Experience (LateNightWithJimmyFallon.com)**; The Biggest Loser Digital Experience (NBC.com); Top Chef: Las Vegas (Bravotv.com)

=== Lighting Design / Direction ===
Lighting Design / Direction
**Outstanding Lighting Direction (Electronic, Multi-Camera) for Variety, Music or Comedy Programming**
- **Vancouver 2010 Olympic Winter Games Opening Ceremony (NBC)**
  - 82nd Academy Awards (ABC)
  - Dancing with the Stars (Episode: "Episode 909A") (ABC)
  - Saturday Night Live (Episode: "Host: Betty White") (NBC)

=== Main Title Design ===
Main Title Design
**Outstanding Main Title Design**
- **Bored to Death (HBO)**
  - Human Target (HBO)
  - Nurse Jackie (Showtime)
  - Temple Grandin (HBO)
  - The Pacific (HBO)

=== Make-up ===
Makeup
**Outstanding Make-up for a Single-Camera Series (Non-Prosthetic)**: **Grey's Anatomy (Episode: "Suicide is Painless") (ABC)**; Castle (Episode: "Vampire Weekend") (ABC); Glee (Episode: "The Power of Madonna") (Fox); Glee (Episode: "Theatricality") (Fox); Mad Men (Episode: "Souvenir") (AMC)	**Outstanding Make-up for a Multi-Camera Series or Special (Non-Prosthetic)**: **Saturday Night Live (Episode: "Host: Betty White") (NBC)**; Dancing with the Stars (Episode: "Episode 901A") (ABC); So You Think You Can Dance (Episode: "Episode #615/616A") (CBS); 82nd Academy Awards (ABC); The Big Bang Theory (Episode: "The Electric Can Opener Fluctuation") (CBS)
**Outstanding Make-up for a Miniseries or Movie (Non-Prosthetic)**: **The Pacific (HBO)**; Georgia O'Keeffe (Lifetime); You Don't Know Jack (HBO); Temple Grandin (HBO)	**Outstanding Prosthetic Make-up for a Series, Miniseries, Movie, or Special**: **The Pacific (HBO)**; Castle (Episode: "Vampire Weekend") (ABC); Grey's Anatomy (Episode: "How Insensitive") (ABC); Nip/Tuck (Episode: "Enigma") (FX); True Blood (Episode: "Scratches") (HBO)

=== Music ===
Music
**Outstanding Music Composition for a Series (Original Dramatic Score)**: **24 (Episode: "3:00 p.m. – 4:00 p.m.") (Fox)**; Batman: The Brave and the Bold (Episode: "Mayhem of The Music Meister!") (Cartoon Network); FlashForward (Episode: "No More Good Days") (ABC); Lost (Episode: "The End") (ABC); Psych (Episode: "Mr. Yin Presents...") (USA)	**Outstanding Music Composition for a Miniseries, Movie, or Special (Original Dramatic Score)**: **Temple Grandin (HBO)**; Blessed Is The Match (PBS); Georgia O'Keeffe (Lifetime); The Pacific (Episode: "Home") (HBO); When Love Is Not Enough: The Lois Wilson Story (Hallmark Hall of Fame Presentation) (CBS); You Don't Know Jack (HBO)
**Outstanding Music Direction**: **Vancouver 2010 Olympic Winter Games Opening Ceremony (NBC)**; 82nd Academy Awards (ABC); Andrea Bocelli & David Foster: My Christmas (Great Performances) (PBS); Celtic Woman: Songs From The Heart (PBS); In Performance At The White House: Fiesta Latina (PBS); The Kennedy Center Honors (CBS)	**Outstanding Original Music and Lyrics**: **Monk (Episode: "Mr. Monk and the End: Part 2", Song: "When I'm Gone") (USA)**; Family Guy (Episode: "Extra Large Medium", Song: "Down's Syndrome Girl") (Fox); How I Met Your Mother (Episode: Girls Versus Suits, Song: "Nothing Suits Me Like A Suit") (CBS); Rescue Me (Episode: "Disease", Song: "How Lovely To Be A Vegetable") (FX); Saturday Night Live (Episode: "Host: Blake Lively", Song: "Shy Ronnie") (NBC); Treme (Episode: "I'll Fly Away", Song: "This City") (HBO)
**Outstanding Original Main Title Theme Music**: **Nurse Jackie (Showtime)**; Human Target (Fox); Justified (Fox); Legend of the Seeker (Syndicated); Warehouse 13 (Syfy)

=== Picture Editing ===
Picture Editing
**Outstanding Single-Camera Picture Editing for a Drama Series**: **Lost (Episode: "The End") (ABC)**; Dexter (Episode: "The Getaway") (Showtime); Breaking Bad (Episode: "No Mas") (AMC); Mad Men (Episode: "The Gypsy and the Hobo") (AMC); Mad Men (Episode: "Guy Walks Into an Advertising Agency") (AMC)	**Outstanding Single-or Multi-Camera Picture Editing for a Comedy Series**: **Modern Family (Episode: "Pilot") (ABC)**; 30 Rock (Episode: "Dealbreakers Talk Show #0001") (NBC); Curb Your Enthusiasm (Episode: "The Bare Midriff") (HBO); Curb Your Enthusiasm (Episode: "The Table Read") (HBO); Modern Family (Episode: "Family Portrait") (ABC)
**Outstanding Single-Camera Picture Editing for a Miniseries or Movie**: **Temple Grandin (HBO)**; The Pacific (Episode: "Peleliu Landing") (HBO); The Pacific (Episode: "Iwo Jima") (HBO); The Pacific (Episode: "Okinawa") (HBO); You Don't Know Jack (HBO)	**Outstanding Picture Editing for Reality Programming**: **Intervention (Episode: "Robby") (A&E)**; The Amazing Race (Episode: "I Think We're Fighting The Germans, Right?") (CBS); Extreme Makeover: Home Edition (Episode: "Extreme Makeover: The Muppet Edition") (ABC); Survivor (Episode: "Tonight, We Make Our Move") (CBS); Top Chef (Episode: "Vivre Las Vegas") (Bravo)
**Outstanding Picture Editing for Nonfiction Programming**: **By the People: The Election of Barack Obama (HBO)**; America: The Story of Us (Episode: "Division") (History Channel); Deadliest Catch (Episode: "No Second Chances") (Discovery Channel); Life (Episode: "Challenges on Life") (Discovery Channel); Whale Wars (Episode: "The Stuff of Nightmares") (Animal Planet)	**Outstanding Picture Editing for a Special (Single or Multi-Camera)**: **The 25th Anniversary Rock And Roll Hall of Fame Concert (HBO)**; Kathy Griffin: Balls of Steel (Bravo); Robin Williams: Weapons of Self Destruction (HBO); The Kennedy Center Honors (CBS)
**Outstanding Short Form Picture Editing**: **Late Night with Jimmy Fallon (6-Bee, "Episode 226") (NBC)**; 82nd Academy Awards (Horror Tribute) (ABC); 82nd Academy Awards (John Hughes Tribute) (ABC); American Idol (Dream, "Episode 924/925A") (FOX); Jimmy Kimmel Live! (The Handsome Men's Club, "Episode 10-1330") (ABC); Jimmy Kimmel Live! (The Late Night Wars, "Episode 10-1304") (ABC)

=== Sound ===
Sound
**Outstanding Sound Editing for a Series**: **24 (Episode: "4:00 am – 5:00 am") (Fox)**; Breaking Bad (Episode: "One Minute") (AMC); Fringe (Episode: "White Tulip") (Fox); Lost (Episode: "The End") (ABC); True Blood (Episode: "Beyond Here Lies Nothin") (HBO)	**Outstanding Sound Editing for a Miniseries, Movie, or Special**: **The Pacific (Episode: "Part Five") (HBO)**; Alice (Episode: "Part 1") (Syfy); Temple Grandin (HBO); Moonshot (History Channel)
**Outstanding Sound Editing for Nonfiction Programming (Single or Multi-Camera)**: **America: The Story of Us (Episode: "Division") (History Channel)**; Life (Episode: "Challenges on Life") (Discovery Channel); Teddy: In His Own Words (HBO); The Amazing Race (Episode: "I Think We're Fighting the Germans, Right?") (CBS); The National Parks: America's Best Idea (Episode: The Scripture of Nature) (PBS)	**Outstanding Sound Mixing for a Comedy or Drama Series (One Hour)**: **Glee (Episode: "The Power of Madonna") (Fox)**; 24 (Episode: "3:00 p.m. – 4:00 p.m.") (Fox); Dexter (Episode: "Hello, Dexter Morgan") (Showtime); House (Episode: "Epic Fail") (Fox); Lost (Episode: "The End") (ABC)
**Outstanding Sound Mixing for a Miniseries or Movie**: **The Pacific (Episode: "Basilone") (HBO)**; The Pacific (Episode: "Peleliu Landing") (HBO); The Pacific (Episode: "Iwo Jima") (HBO); The Pacific (Episode: "Okinawa") (HBO)	**Outstanding Sound Mixing for a Comedy or Drama Series (Half-Hour) and Animation**: **Entourage (Episode: "One Car, Two Car, Red Car, Blue Car") (HBO)**; **Modern Family (Episode: "En Garde") (ABC)**; 30 Rock (Episode: "Argus") (NBC); The Office (Episode: "Niagara") (NBC); Two and a Half Men (Episode: "Fart Jokes, Pie and Celeste") (CBS)
**Outstanding Sound Mixing for a Variety Series or Special**: **The 25th Anniversary Rock And Roll Hall of Fame Concert (HBO) (TIE)**; **53rd Grammy Awards (CBS) (TIE)**; American Idol (Episode: "Episode #943 Finale") (Fox); Dancing with the Stars (Episode: "Episode #907") (ABC); American Idol (Episode: "Episode #933 Idol Gives Back") (Fox); 82nd Academy Awards (ABC)	**Outstanding Sound Mixing for Nonfiction Programming**: **Deadliest Catch (Episode: "No Second Chances") (Discovery Channel)**; Life (Episode: "Challenges of Life") (Discovery Channel); Spectacle Elvis Costello With... (Episode: "Spectacle Elvis Costello With Bruce Springsteen – Part 1 & 2") (Sundance Channel); The Amazing Race (Episode: "I Think We're Fighting the Germans, Right?") (CBS); The National Parks: America's Best Idea (Episode: "The Scripture of Nature") (PBS)

=== Special Visual Effects ===
Special Visual Effects
**Outstanding Special Visual Effects for a Series**: **CSI: Crime Scene Investigation (Episode: "Family Affair") (CBS)**; Stargate Universe (Episode: "Air") (Syfy); Stargate Universe (Episode: "Space") (Syfy); Caprica (Episode: "There Is Another Sky") (Syfy); V (Episode: "Pilot") (ABC)	**Outstanding Special Visual Effects for a Miniseries or Movie**: **The Pacific (Episode: "Peleliu Landing") (HBO)**; Ben 10: Alien Swarm (Cartoon Network); The Pacific (Episode: "Guadalcanal/Leckie") (HBO); Virtuality (Fox)

=== Stunt Coordination ===
Stunt Coordination
**Outstanding Stunt Coordination**
- **FlashForward (Episode: "No More Good Days") (ABC)**
  - 24 (Episode: "6:00 p.m. – 7:00 p.m.") (Fox)
  - Chuck (Episode: "Chuck Vs. The Tic Tac") (NBC)
  - House (Episode: "Brave Heart") (Fox)
  - Human Target (Episode: "Run") (Fox)

=== Technical Direction ===
Technical Direction
**Outstanding Technical Direction, Camerawork, Video Control for a Series**: **Dancing with the Stars (Episode: "Episode 909A") (ABC)**; Late Show With David Letterman (Episode: "Episode 3150") (CBS); Saturday Night Live (Episode: "Host: Joseph Gordon-Levitt") (NBC); The Big Bang Theory (Episode: "The Adhesive Duck Deficiency") (CBS); The Daily Show With Jon Stewart (Episode: "Episode 15032") (Comedy Central)	**Outstanding Technical Direction, Camerawork, Video Control for a Miniseries, Movie, or Special**: **The 25th Anniversary Rock And Roll Hall of Fame Concert (HBO)**; 52nd Grammy Awards (CBS); 82nd Academy Awards (ABC); Robin Williams: Weapons of Self Destruction (HBO); The Kennedy Center Honors (CBS)

=== Writing ===
Writing
**Outstanding Writing for Nonfiction Programming**: **The National Parks: America's Best Idea (Episode: "The Last Refuge") (PBS)**; America: The Story of Us (Episode: "Division") (History Channel); Anthony Bourdain: No Reservations (Episode: "Prague") (Travel Channel); Life (Episode: "Challenges of Life") (Discovery Channel); The Buddha (PBS)	**Outstanding Writing for a Variety, Music, or Comedy Series**: **The Colbert Report (Comedy Central)**; The Daily Show with Jon Stewart (Comedy Central); Real Time with Bill Maher (HBO); Saturday Night Live (NBC); The Tonight Show with Conan O'Brien (NBC)

== Programs with multiple awards ==
By network (Note: Only includes categories above)

- HBO – 17
- ABC – 15
- Fox – 9
- NBC – 7
- PBS – 7
- CBS – 7
- Showtime - 5
- Cartoon Network - 4
- AMC - 2
- Discovery Channel - 2

By program

- The Pacific – 7
- Prep & Landing – 4
- Modern Family – 3
- Saturday Night Live 3
- The 25th Anniversary Rock And Roll Hall of Fame Concert - 3
- 24 – 2
- CSI: Crime Scene Investigation – 2
- Dancing With The Stars – 2
- Generator Rex – 2
- Glee – 2
- Mad Men – 2
- Return To Cranford (Masterpiece) – 2
- So You Think You Can Dance – 2
- Survivor – 2
- Temple Grandin – 2
- The National Parks: America's Best Idea – 2
- The Simpsons – 2
- The Tudors – 2
- Vancouver 2010 Olympic Winter Games Opening Ceremony – 2

== Programs with multiple nominations ==
By network

- HBO – 68
- ABC – 49
- CBS – 38

By program

- The Pacific – 19
- 82nd Academy Awards – 12
- Glee – 9
