= List of Netflix original films (2015–2017) =

Netflix is an American global on-demand Internet streaming media provider, that has distributed a number of original programs, including original series, specials, miniseries, documentaries and films. Netflix's original films also include content that was first screened on cinematic release in other countries or given exclusive broadcast in other territories, and is then described as Netflix original content.

== Feature films ==
Title	Release date	Genre	Runtime	Language
Beasts of No Nation	October 16, 2015	War drama	2 h 17 min	English
The Ridiculous 6	December 11, 2015	Western comedy	2 h	English
Pee-wee's Big Holiday	March 18, 2016	Adventure comedy	1 h 30 min	English
Special Correspondents	April 29, 2016	Satire	1 h 41 min	English
The Do-Over	May 27, 2016	Action comedy	1 h 48 min	English
The Fundamentals of Caring	June 24, 2016	Comedy drama	1 h 37 min	English
Brahman Naman	July 7, 2016	Sex comedy	1 h 35 min	English
Rebirth	July 15, 2016	Thriller	1 h 40 min	English
Tallulah	July 29, 2016	Comedy drama	1 h 51 min	English
XOXO	August 26, 2016	Drama	1 h 32 min	English
ARQ	September 16, 2016	Science fiction / Thriller	1 h 28 min	English
The Siege of Jadotville	October 7, 2016	War	1 h 48 min	English
Mascots	October 13, 2016	Mockumentary	1 h 35 min	English
I Am the Pretty Thing That Lives in the House	October 28, 2016	Horror	1 h 29 min	English
7 años	October 28, 2016	Drama	1 h 17 min	Spanish
True Memoirs of an International Assassin	November 11, 2016	Action comedy	1 h 38 min	English
Mercy	November 22, 2016	Thriller	1 h 27 min	English
Spectral	December 9, 2016	Science fiction / Action	1 h 48 min	English
Barry	December 16, 2016	Biopic	1 h 44 min	English
Coin Heist	January 6, 2017	Heist	1 h 37 min	English
Clinical	January 13, 2017	Horror thriller	1 h 44 min	English
Take the 10	January 20, 2017	Comedy	1 h 20 min	English
iBOY	January 27, 2017	Science fiction / Thriller	1 h 30 min	English
Imperial Dreams	February 3, 2017	Drama	1 h 26 min	English
Girlfriend's Day	February 14, 2017	Comedy drama	1 h 10 min	English
I Don't Feel at Home in This World Anymore	February 24, 2017	Thriller drama	1 h 36 min	English
Burning Sands	March 10, 2017	Drama	1 h 42 min	English
Deidra & Laney Rob a Train	March 17, 2017	Comedy crime	1 h 32 min	English
The Most Hated Woman in America	March 24, 2017	Biopic	1 h 32 min	English
The Discovery	March 31, 2017	Science fiction / Drama	1 h 42 min	English
Win It All	April 7, 2017	Comedy	1 h 28 min	English
Sandy Wexler	April 14, 2017	Comedy	2 h 11 min	English
Sand Castle	April 21, 2017	War	1 h 53 min	English
Tramps	April 21, 2017	Romantic comedy	1 h 23 min	English
Small Crimes	April 28, 2017	Dark comedy	1 h 35 min	English
Handsome: A Netflix Mystery Movie	May 5, 2017	Comedy mystery	1 h 21 min	English
BLAME!	May 20, 2017	Anime / Science fiction	1 h 46 min	Japanese
War Machine	May 26, 2017	War-Comedy	2 h 2 min	English
Shimmer Lake	June 9, 2017	Crime thriller	1 h 26 min	English
Okja	June 28, 2017	Action-adventure	2 h 1 min	English
To the Bone	July 14, 2017	Drama	1 h 47 min	English
The Incredible Jessica James	July 28, 2017	Romantic comedy	1 h 23 min	English
Naked	August 11, 2017	Comedy	1 h 36 min	English
Death Note	August 25, 2017	Horror thriller	1 h 40 min	English
Little Evil	September 1, 2017	Comedy horror	1 h 34 min	English
#realityhigh	September 8, 2017	Teen comedy	1 h 39 min	English
First They Killed My Father	September 15, 2017	Biographical drama	2 h 16 min	Khmer
Gerald's Game	September 29, 2017	Horror thriller	1 h 43 min	English
Our Souls at Night	September 29, 2017	Romance	1 h 43 min	English
Bomb Scared	October 12, 2017	Black comedy	1 h 29 min	Spanish
The Babysitter	October 13, 2017	Teen comedy horror	1 h 25 min	English
The Meyerowitz Stories (New and Selected)	October 13, 2017	Comedy drama	1 h 52 min	English
1922	October 20, 2017	Horror / Crime drama	1 h 42 min	English
Wheelman	October 20, 2017	Action thriller	1 h 22 min	English
The Killer	November 10, 2017	Western	1 h 39 min	Portuguese
A Christmas Prince	November 17, 2017	Christmas romantic comedy	1 h 32 min	English
El Camino Christmas	December 8, 2017	Christmas dark comedy	1 h 29 min	English
Christmas Inheritance	December 15, 2017	Christmas romantic drama	1 h 44 min	English
Bright	December 22, 2017	Urban fantasy	1 h 57 min	English

== Documentaries ==
Title	Release date	Runtime	Language
My Own Man	March 6, 2015	1 h 21 min	English
The Other One: The Long Strange Trip of Bob Weir	May 22, 2015	1 h 23 min	English
Hot Girls Wanted	May 29, 2015	1 h 24 min	English
What Happened, Miss Simone?	June 26, 2015	1 h 24 min	English
Tig	July 17, 2015	1 h 20 min	English
Keith Richards: Under the Influence	September 18, 2015	1 h 21 min	English
Winter on Fire: Ukraine's Fight for Freedom	October 9, 2015	1 h 31 min	Ukrainian
My Beautiful Broken Brain	March 18, 2016	1 h 31 min	English
Team Foxcatcher	April 29, 2016	1 h 30 min	English
Tony Robbins: I Am Not Your Guru	July 15, 2016	1 h 56 min	English
I'll Sleep When I'm Dead	August 19, 2016	1 h 19 min	English
Extremis	September 13, 2016	24 min	English
The White Helmets	September 16, 2016	40 min	English
Audrie & Daisy	September 23, 2016	1 h 38 min	English
Amanda Knox	September 30, 2016	1 h 32 min	English
13th	October 7, 2016	1 h 40 min	English
Sky Ladder: The Art of Cai Guo-Qiang	October 14, 2016	1 h 19 min	Mandarin
Into the Inferno	October 28, 2016	1 h 47 min	English
The Ivory Game	November 4, 2016	1 h 52 min	English
Casting JonBenet	April 28, 2017	1 h 20 min	English
The Mars Generation	May 5, 2017	1 h 37 min	English
Get Me Roger Stone	May 12, 2017	1 h 41 min	English
Laerte-se	May 19, 2017	1 h 40 min	Portuguese
Joshua: Teenager vs. Superpower	May 26, 2017	1 h 18 min	English
CounterPunch	June 16, 2017	1 h 31 min	English
Nobody Speak: Trials of the Free Press	June 23, 2017	1 h 35 min	English
Chasing Coral	July 14, 2017	1 h 29 min	English
Icarus	August 4, 2017	2 h	English
Resurface	September 1, 2017	27 min	English
Heroin(e)	September 12, 2017	39 min	English
Strong Island	September 15, 2017	1 h 47 min	English
Gaga: Five Foot Two	September 22, 2017	1 h 40 min	English
Long Shot	September 29, 2017	40 min	English
The Death and Life of Marsha P. Johnson	October 6, 2017	1 h 45 min	English
Kingdom of Us	October 13, 2017	1 h 49 min	English
One of Us	October 20, 2017	1 h 35 min	English
Joan Didion: The Center Will Not Hold	October 27, 2017	1 h 38 min	English
Jim & Andy: The Great Beyond – Featuring a Very Special, Contractually Obligated Mention of Tony Clifton	November 17, 2017	1 h 34 min	English
Saving Capitalism	November 21, 2017	1 h 13 min	English
Cuba and the Cameraman	November 24, 2017	1 h 54 min	English
Voyeur	December 1, 2017	1 h 35 min	English

== Specials ==
These programs are one-time original events or supplementary content related to original films.

Title	Release date	Genre	Runtime	Language
A Very Murray Christmas	December 4, 2015	Comedy / Musical	56 min	English
Justin Timberlake + The Tennessee Kids	October 12, 2016	Concert film	1 h 30 min	English
13th: A Conversation with Oprah Winfrey & Ava DuVernay	January 26, 2017	Aftershow / Interview	36 min	English
Michael Bolton's Big, Sexy Valentine's Day Special	February 7, 2017	Variety show	54 min	English
Rodney King	April 28, 2017	One-man show	52 min	English
Barbra: The Music, The Mem'ries, The Magic	November 22, 2017	Concert film	1 h 48 min	English
