= Lists of Netflix original films =

The following are lists of Netflix original films by year:

- List of Netflix original films (2015–2017)
- List of Netflix original films (2018)
- List of Netflix original films (2019)
- List of Netflix original films (2020)
- List of Netflix original films (2021)
- List of Netflix original films (2022)
- List of Netflix original films (2023)
- List of Netflix original films (2024)
- List of Netflix original films (2025)
- List of Netflix original films (since 2026)

== See also ==
- Lists of ended Netflix original programming
- Lists of Netflix exclusive international distribution programming
- List of Netflix original programming
- List of Netflix original stand-up comedy specials
- List of Netflix India original programming
