= Resurface (film) =

2017 documentary film

- Directed by: Joshua Izenberg; Wynn Padula
- Starring: Bobby Lane; Van Curaza; Martin Pollock
- Distributed by: Netflix
- Release date: September 1, 2017
- Running time: 26 minutes
- Country: United States
- Language: English

Resurface is a 2017 short documentary film about a veteran who was on the verge of suicide before finding an outlet in the form of surfing.

The documentary was released on Netflix on September 1, 2017.

== Cast ==
- Bobby Lane
- Van Curaza
- Martin Pollock
- Mike Shurley
- Sean Meyer
- Wallace J. Nichols

== Release ==
It was released on September 1, 2017 on Netflix streaming.
