= My Own Man =

2014 documentary film by David Sampliner

- Film poster
- Directed by: David Sampliner
- Written by: David Sampliner
- Produced by: Edward Norton
- Production companies: Class 5 Films; Sixteen Tons Productions
- Distributed by: Netflix
- Release date: December 31, 2014
- Running time: 82 minutes
- Country: United States
- Language: English

My Own Man is a 2014 documentary film taking a look at what it means to be a man in today's society. David Sampliner's search starts when he learns he’s about to become a father to a baby boy and is unsure of his abilities to raise his son into manhood. The story of the 40-year-old's search which includes vocal lessons, warrior weekends and hunting before turning into a deeper look at his relationship with his own father. The film is executive produced by Edward Norton.

== Cast ==
- David Sampliner
