= Hooked (How I Met Your Mother) =

- How I Met Your Mother episode
- Episode no.: Season 5 Episode 16
- Directed by: Pamela Fryman
- Written by: Kourtney Kang
- Production code: 5ALH16
- Original air date: March 1, 2010

Guest appearances
- Carrie Underwood as Tiffany; David Burtka as Scooter; Catherine Reitman as Henrietta

Episode chronology
← Previous "Rabbit or Duck"	Next → "Of Course"
- How I Met Your Mother season 5

"Hooked" is the 16th episode of the fifth season of the CBS sitcom How I Met Your Mother and 104th episode overall. It originally aired on March 1, 2010.

== Plot ==
Future Ted mentions how most his stories have been romantic or have portrayed him in a fairly positive light, but in this next story, he was simply a jerk. Ted tells the gang that he has invited a woman over under the pretense of checking out his antique camera collection, which Barney classifies as "bait". He's tried many types of bait (slot machine, trampoline), but found that a teacup pig is the best kind, which Ted then borrows after seeing the reaction Robin, Marshall and Lily gave.

Later, Ted is at MacLaren's telling the gang about this woman, Tiffany (Carrie Underwood), he snared using the pig. She says she's really into him, but can't be with him "right now" because of her boyfriend. The gang sees through her ruse, telling Ted that he's been "hooked", a euphemism for stringing someone along until they meet someone better.

Everyone gives an example: Marshall did a high school classmate's homework and was her "secret boyfriend", Robin allows her pre-morning show cameraman to pamper her, and Lily's high school flame, Scooter (David Burtka), works at her school as cafeteria staff, where she doesn't exactly tell him that a romantic relationship is impossible.

Ted refuses to believe that he has been hooked up, and continues waiting on Tiffany. When she shows up to the bar with her co-workers, Barney is excited to see that she and all her friends are pharmaceutical representatives, which he calls the "hot-chick" profession of their generation (like the nurse or stewardess was in the past). He hooks up with several of them, before meeting a particularly plain rep, declaring the era of the "hot pharma girl" over.

All the while, Ted himself has "hooked" Henrietta (Catherine Reitman), a librarian from Columbia. Henrietta treats Ted just like he treats Tiffany, even assembling a sumptuous dinner (with an ice sculpture) when he drops by. Ted is just as dismissive of Henrietta as Tiffany is of him. Soon, Ted is invited to go to a wedding with Tiffany, which he sees as a sign of commitment, and he meets her in the room with champagne. Much to his chagrin, she comes in with the best man, the guy who "hooked" her, and she proceeds to pamper him in front of Ted. Ted leaves, intent on making sure Henrietta doesn't feel the same heartbreak.

Unfortunately, he took the best man's jacket by accident, which had the wedding ring inside. Bending over at Henrietta's door to tie his shoes, the ring falls out, and Henrietta opens the door to see Ted down on his knee, in a tuxedo, with a ring in his hand. She immediately assumes he is proposing, says yes, and introduces him to her parents (who had stopped by). With a fair amount of awkwardness, Ted explains what has happened and makes sure she knows that they will never be together.

Meanwhile, Marshall tries to get Lily to let Scooter know she is never going to be with him, but she is immobilized by Scooter's cute puppy-dog eyes. Marshall uses Barney's teacup pig (in a cute blanket) to train Lily to resist Scooter. Eventually, it works, and the two head down to the cafeteria, but even though Lily is able to tell Scooter it will never happen, Marshall himself can't resist Scooter's charm, telling him to wait until Marshall is dead.

Finally, Barney is getting over the loss of the "hot pharma girls", waxing poetic on the next "hot girl" profession. The gang is suspicious of his optimism, which he reveals has been inflated by his use of some "purple pills" one of the girls left in his apartment.

== Production ==
Unusual for the show, this episode filmed in front of a live studio audience, consisting of members of the Television Critics Association. The show is normally pre-recorded and the complete episode played for an audience which is then recorded for the laugh track. Writer Kourtney Kang described singer Carrie Underwood as a 'pleasant surprise' and worked to find additional jokes for her after she performed well in rehearsals.

Kang had planned to have Barney include the bone organ from The Goonies as one of the things he used to get women to visit his apartment but the idea was dropped as it was too difficult to get permission.

== Critical response ==
Donna Bowman of The A.V. Club rated the episode with a grade B−. She calls "the structure familiar in outline, but just the slightest bit shoddy in execution" and is a little disappointed by the good episode because it is not at the same high level as the rest of the season.

Lindsey Bahr of The Atlantic wrote that the episode "wasn't all that funny" because "there were too many failed jokes".

Brian Zoromski of IGN gave the episode 8.5 out of 10. He was surprised how well singer Carrie Underwood performed in her first acting role. He found the scene where Ted accidentally proposes "groan-worthy" and likened it to a scene straight out of Three's Company.

Cindy McLennan of Television Without Pity rated the episode with a grade C+. She criticizes the idea of the hot-pharmaceutical girl as unoriginal, saying it "was funny seven and a half years ago, when Heather Locklear played one on Scrubs". Finally she notes the writers of the show have been keeping the audience on the hook for years and it might be better not to rub it in their faces.

Alan Sepinwall and The Star-Ledger admired Bob Saget, but didn't like Carrie Underwood's appearance in the episode.
