= Keeping the Faith =

2000 film directed by Edward Norton

- Theatrical release poster
- Directed by: Edward Norton
- Written by: Stuart Blumberg
- Produced by: Hawk Koch; Edward Norton; Stuart Blumberg
- Starring: Ben Stiller; Jenna Elfman; Edward Norton; Eli Wallach; Anne Bancroft
- Cinematography: Anastas N. Michos
- Edited by: Malcolm Campbell
- Music by: Elmer Bernstein
- Production companies: Touchstone Pictures; Spyglass Entertainment; Koch Co. Norton/Blumberg Productions; Triple Threat Talent
- Distributed by: Buena Vista Pictures Distribution (United States); Spyglass Entertainment (International)
- Release date: April 14, 2000
- Running time: 128 minutes
- Country: United States
- Language: English
- Budget: $29 million
- Box office: $59.9 million

Keeping the Faith is a 2000 American romantic comedy film written by Stuart Blumberg, and starring Ben Stiller, Edward Norton (in his directorial debut), Jenna Elfman, Eli Wallach, and Anne Bancroft. The film was released by Touchstone Pictures and Spyglass Entertainment, in association with Triple Threat Talent, on April 14, 2000.

The film is dedicated to Norton's late mother, Robin. It had a budget of $29 million.

== Plot ==
In a New York City bar, a drunken Catholic priest, Brian Finn, tells the bartender about the ongoing love triangle involving him; his best friend Jake Schram, a Jewish rabbi; and their childhood friend, Anna Reilly.

Dedicated to his calling as priest since childhood, Brian shares the duties of his parish with the elderly Father Havel. Jake, inseparable from Brian since childhood, is the youngest rabbi at his synagogue; he focuses on his work to the detriment of his romantic life, much to the chagrin of his mother, Ruth. The duo actively seek to bring a more modern, albeit controversial, approach to religious services; they plan to open a jointly-sponsored interfaith karaoke community center. The pair reminisce about their childhood friend Anna. The three were close until Anna's family moved to California and they ultimately lost touch.

Sixteen years later, Anna returns to New York for work and the trio rekindle their friendship. Anna and Jake begin having casual sex. As they begin to develop mutual romantic feelings, their relationship is complicated by Anna not being a Jew, and by Brian, who finds himself in internal turmoil after also developing feelings for Anna. Finding himself in conflict with his vows, he seriously considers leaving the priesthood to pursue a romantic relationship with her.

At dinner, Ruth reveals to Anna that she knows about her and Jake's secret relationship. Later that night, Jake and Anna argue over the religious issues complicating their romance and breakup. Anna calls Brian for comfort and he rushes to her, taking her tearful ramblings to be a confession of feelings for him. Brian kisses Anna and confesses his love but she rebuffs him, revealing she is in love with Jake and they have been seeing each other secretly. Embarrassed and rejected, he spends the night binge drinking on the streets. The following morning, Brian stumbles into Jake's temple and interrupts a post-bar mitzvah gathering, resulting in a confrontation that ends when Brian punches Jake. Brian then finds his way into a bar and tells the bartender his story; the bartender offers Brian advice on how to remedy the situation. Brian then reaffirms his vows with Father Havel's guidance.

As the community center's grand opening approaches, Brian reconciles with Jake and Anna. Brian encourages Jake to follow his heart and reveal his true feelings to Anna before she returns to California. Interrupting Anna's going-away party, Jake sets things right. That evening, Jake and Anna surprise Brian at the community center. She reveals that she had been taking classes to convert to Judaism for Jake. Their relationship officially renewed, the trio pose for a celebratory photo.

== Cast ==
- Ben Stiller as Rabbi Jacob "Jake" Schram
  - Samuel R. Goldberg as teenage Jake Schram
- Edward Norton as Father Brian Kilkenney Finn
  - Michael Charles Roman as teenage Brian Finn
- Jenna Elfman as Anna Reilly
  - Blythe Auffarth as teenage Anna Reilly
- Anne Bancroft as Ruth Schram
- Miloš Forman as Father Havel
- Eli Wallach as Rabbi Ben Lewis
- Holland Taylor as Bonnie Rose
- Lisa Edelstein as Ali Decker
- Rena Sofer as Rachel Rose
- Bodhi Elfman as Howard the Casanova, the businessman in the office across the road
- Brian George as Paulie Chopra, the Sikh Tamil separatist Catholic Muslim with Jewish in-laws who owns an Irish Pub
- Ron Rifkin as Larry Friedman
- David Wain as Steve Posner
- Eugene Katz as Mohel (performing the circumcision in opening sequence where Jake faints)
- Ken Leung as Don, the electronics store owner
- Susie Essman as Ellen Friedman
- Catherine Lloyd Burns as Debbie
- Radio Man (Craig Castaldo) as himself
- Brian Anthony Wilson as T-Bone

== Production ==
=== Filming ===
Principal photography began on May 24, 1999 in Bow Bridge. Filming took place in New York cities of Congregation B'nai Abraham, The Cloisters Museum, Manhattan and New York. Filming completed on August 18, 1999.

== Release ==
Buena Vista Pictures Distribution released the film in the United States and Canada, with Spyglass Entertainment handling international sales. Buena Vista International handled distribution in Latin America, United Kingdom, Australia and Singapore.

== Reception ==
Keeping the Faith received generally positive reviews. On Rotten Tomatoes, it holds a 69% rating, sampled from 117 film critics, with an average score of 6.23/10. The consensus states: "A dramedy featuring an unusual love triangle, Keeping the Faith is a perceptive look at how religion affects us in everyday life." Metacritic gives the film a score of 60 out of 100, based on reviews from 31 critics, indicating "mixed or average" reviews. The New York Times film critic Elvis Mitchell said the film "struggles hard to be a modern romantic comedy about commitment and, well, faith, but it doesn't quite make the grade ... it is competent, but it seems driven to clear up complications as quickly as acne is dispatched in an infomercial." In Variety, Emanuel Levy praised Stiller's acting and said "Keeping the Faith is arguably the most accomplished" romantic movie in its era.

=== Box office ===
The film opened at #3 at the US box office, making $8,078,671 in its opening weekend, behind 28 Days and Rules of Engagement. The film eventually grossed $37,047,880 in North America and $22,897,303 in other territories, totaling $59,945,183 worldwide.

== See also ==
- Minsara Kanavu, a 1997 Indian Tamil-language film with a similar premise
