= By the People: The Election of Barack Obama =

2009 documentary film directed by Amy Rice and Alicia Sams

- Directed by: Amy Rice; Alicia Sams [ktn]
- Produced by: Bristol Baughan; Deric Margolis; D.J. Martin; Audrey Rosenberg; Benjamin Goldhirsh; Dan O'Meara; Chris Romano; Edward Norton; Stuart Blumberg; William Migliore; Elissa Brown; Amy Rice; Alicia Sams
- Starring: Barack Obama, various
- Edited by: Sam Pollard; Geeta Gandbhir; Arielle Amsalem
- Music by: Craig Wedren
- Production company: HBO Documentary Films
- Distributed by: HBO
- Release date: August 7, 2009
- Running time: 116 minutes
- Country: United States
- Language: English

By the People: The Election of Barack Obama is a 2009 documentary film broadcast in November 2009 on HBO, following Barack Obama and various members of his campaign team, including David Axelrod, through the two years leading up to the United States presidential election on November 4, 2008.

Proceeds from the sale of the soundtrack of this film went to United Way and Enterprise Community Partners. Both organizations will put the funds toward rebuilding efforts in the Gulf Coast region.
