= Sam Elliott filmography =

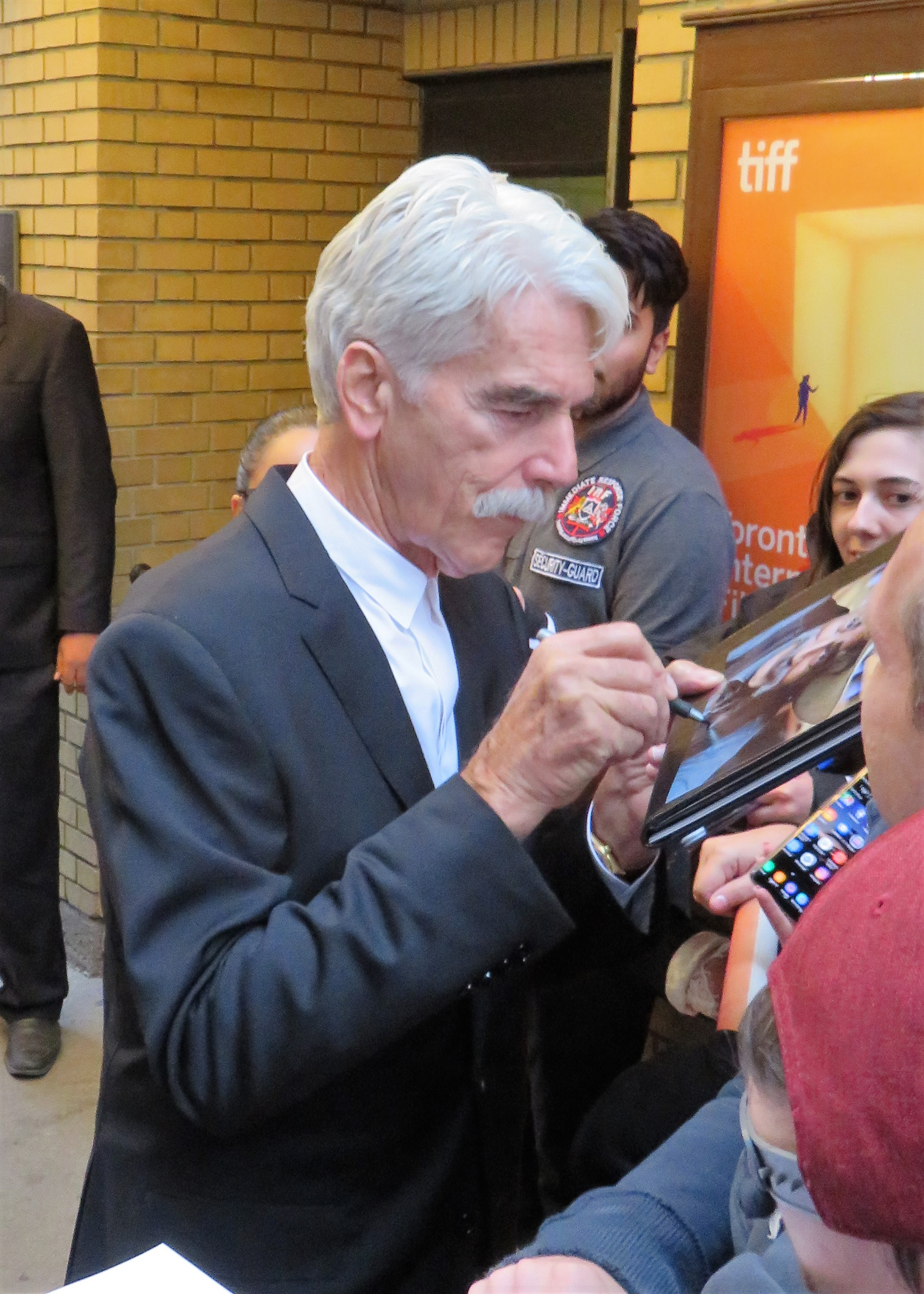
Elliott at the 2018 Toronto International Film Festival

The filmography of American actor Sam Elliott includes nearly 100 credits in both film and television. He came to prominence for his portrayal of gruff cowboy characters in Western films and TV series, making early minor appearances in The Way West (1967) and Butch Cassidy and the Sundance Kid (1969). He went on to appear in several horror films, such as Frogs (1972) and The Legacy (1978), and appeared in various television series. His film breakthrough was the drama Mask (1985), in which he co-starred with Cher. In 1989, he starred in the Christmas movie Prancer, playing a widowed apple farmer whose daughter finds an injured reindeer and tends to it in the belief it is one of Santa's. The 1989 film Road House also featured Elliott.

He would reprise his Western image in 1991's television film Conagher, for which he earned a Golden Globe nomination for Best Actor, followed by his role portraying Virgil Earp in Tombstone (1993). He also appeared in Gettysburg (1993), in which he played Brigadier General John Buford. He earned his second Golden Globe nomination for his supporting portrayal of Wild Bill Hickok in the miniseries Buffalo Girls (1995). He had a small (but crucial) role in the comedy The Big Lebowski (1998), and later had supporting roles in the fantasy The Golden Compass (2007) and the drama Up in the Air (2009).

From 2016 until its ending in 2020, Elliott began portraying Beau Bennett on the Netflix series The Ranch. He subsequently appeared in a supporting role in the musical drama A Star Is Born (2018) directed by and co-starring Bradley Cooper, which earned him a National Board of Review Award for Best Supporting Actor and various nominations, including an Academy Award for Best Supporting Actor nomination and a Screen Actors Guild Award nomination for Outstanding Performance by a Male Actor in a Supporting Role.

== Film ==
Year	Title	Role	Notes	Ref.
1967	The Way West	Missouri Townsman	Uncredited	
1969	Butch Cassidy and the Sundance Kid	Card Player #2		
1970	The Games	Richie Robinson		
1972	Frogs	Pickett Smith		
1972	Molly and Lawless John	Johnny Lawler		
1976	Lifeguard	Rick Carlson		
1978	The Legacy	Pete Danner		
1985	Mask	Gar		
1986	The Blue Lightning	Harold "Harry" Wingate		
1987	Fatal Beauty	Mike Marshak		
1988	Shakedown	Detective Richie Marks		
1989	Road House	Wade Garrett		
1989	Prancer	John Riggs		
1990	Sibling Rivalry	Charles Turner Jr.		
1991	Rush	Larry Dodd		
1993	Tombstone	Virgil Earp		
1993	Gettysburg	Brigadier General John Buford		
1995	Blue River	Henry Howland		
1995	The Final Cut	John Pierce		
1996	Dogwatch	Charlie Falon		
1996	Adventures of Mowgli	Kaa	English voice	
1998	The Big Lebowski	The Stranger		
1998	The Hi-Lo Country	Jim Ed Love		
2000	The Contender	Kermit Newman		
2002	We Were Soldiers	Sergeant Major Basil L. Plumley		
2003	Hulk	General Thaddeus Ross		
2003	Off the Map	Charley Groden		
2005	Thank You for Smoking	Lorne Lutch		
2006	Barnyard	Ben (voice)	Also sung "I Won’t Back Down"	
2006	The Alibi	The Mormon		
2007	Ghost Rider	The Caretaker / Carter Slade / Phantom Rider		
2007	The Golden Compass	Lee Scoresby		
2009	Did You Hear About the Morgans?	Clay Wheeler		
2009	Up in the Air	Captain Maynard Finch		
2010	Marmaduke	Chupadogra / Buster (voice)		
2011	The Big Bang	Simon Kestral		
2012	The Company You Keep	'Mac' McLeod		
2014	Draft Day	Coach Moore		
2015	I'll See You in My Dreams	Bill Young		
2015	Grandma	Karl		
2015	The Good Dinosaur	Butch (voice)		
2017	Rock Dog	Fleetwood Yak (voice)		
2017	The Hero	Lee Hayden		
2017	Audubon	Narrator (voice)		
2018	The Man Who Killed Hitler and Then the Bigfoot	Calvin Barr		
2018	A Star Is Born	Bobby Maine		
2019	Lady and the Tramp	Trusty (voice)		
2025	The Gettysburg Address	Ward Hill Lamon (voice)		

== Television ==
Year	Title	Role	Notes	Ref.
1968–1969	Felony Squad	Numerous	3 episodes	
1969	Land of the Giants	Martin Reed	Episode: "Six Hours to Live"	
1969	The F.B.I.	SAC Kendall Lisbon	Episode: "The Prey"	
1969	Judd, for the Defense	Dan Kenyon	Episode: "The Crystal Maze"	
1969–1970	Lancer	Renslo / Canopus / Cowboy	3 episodes	
1970	The Challenge	Bryant	Television film	
1970–1971	Mission: Impossible	Dr. Douglas Robert (Lang)	13 episodes	
1971	Assault on the Wayne	Ensign Bill Sandover	Television film	
1972	Gunsmoke	Cory Soames	Episode: "The Wedding"	
1972	The Mod Squad	Rick Price	Episode: "Good Times Are Just Memories"	
1972	Molly and Lawless John	Johnny Lawler	Television film	
1973	The Blue Knight	Detective Charlie Bronski	Television film	
1973	Mannix	Bill Saunders	Episode: "Little Girl Lost"	
1973	Hawkins	Luther Wilkes	Episode: "Die Die, Darling"	
1974	Doc Elliot	Lee Barrows	Episode: "A Time to Live"	
1974	Hawaii Five-O	Jack Houston	Episode: "The Two-Faced Corpse"	
1974	Evel Knievel	Evel Knievel	Television film	
1974	The Manhunter	Will Gantry	Episode: "The Ma Gantry Gang"	
1974	The Streets of San Francisco	Ken Johnson	Episode: "The Hard Breed"	
1975	Police Woman	Michael Gregory	Episode: "Farewell, Mary Jane"	
1975	I Will Fight No More Forever	Captain Wood	Television film	
1976–1977	Once an Eagle	Sam Damon	Miniseries; main role	
1977	Aspen	Tom Keating	Television film	
1979	The Sacketts	Tell Sackett	Television film	
1980	Wild Times	Hugh Cardiff	2 episodes	
1981	Murder in Texas	Dr. John Hill	Television film	
1982	The Shadow Riders	Dal Traven	Television film	
1982	The Yellow Rose	Chance McKenzie	Main role	
1984	Travis McGee	Travis McGee	Television film	
1985	A Death in California	D. Jordan Williams	2 episodes	
1987	Gone to Texas	Sam Houston	Television film; also producer	
1987	The Quick and the Dead	Con Vallian	Television film	
1988	The World's Greatest Stunts: A Tribute to Hollywood Stuntmen	Himself	Documentary	
1991	Conagher	Conn Conagher	Television film; also writer and producer	
1992	Fugitive Nights: Danger in the Desert	Lyn Cutter	Television film	
1994	The Desperate Trail	Bill Speakes	Television film	
1995	The Ranger, the Cook and a Hole in the Sky	Bill Bell	Television film	
1995	Buffalo Girls	Bill 'Wild Bill' Hickok	Television film	
1995	Blue River	Henry Howland	Television film	
1995	The Way West	(voice)	Documentary	
1996	Woman Undone	Ross Bishop	Television film	
1997	Rough Riders	Captain 'Bucky' O'Neill	Television film	
1997	Big Guns Talk: The Story of the Western	Himself	Documentary	
1998	Texarkana	—N/a	Television film	
1999	You Know My Name	Bill Tilghman	Television film; also producer	
2000	Fail Safe	Congressman Raskob	Television film	
2001	Pretty When You Cry	Detective Lukas Black	Television film	
2002–2007	American Bikers	Joel Baldwin (voice)	Main role	
2003	Hulk: The Lowdown	Himself (co-host)	Documentary	
2006	Avenger	Calvin Dexter	Television film	
2010	November Christmas	Jesse 'Jess' Sanford	Television film	
2012, 2020	Robot Chicken	Himself / White Wine Narrator / Skito / Reporter (voices)	2 episodes	
2013–2015	Parks and Recreation	Ron Dunn	3 episodes	
2015	Justified	Avery Markham	Main role (season 6)	
2016–2020	The Ranch	Beau Bennett	Main role; also producer	
2016	American Dad!	John 'Big John' Tanner (voice)	Episode: "Kiss Kiss Cam Cam"	
2016	Grace and Frankie	Phil Milstein	4 episodes	
2019–present	Family Guy	Wild West / Himself (voices)	22 episodes	
2021–2022	1883	Shea Brennan	Main role	
2021	MacGruber	Perry	4 episodes	
2025	Landman	T.L. Norris	Main Role (Season 2)	
