= List of awards and nominations received by Sam Elliott =

List of Sam Elliott awards
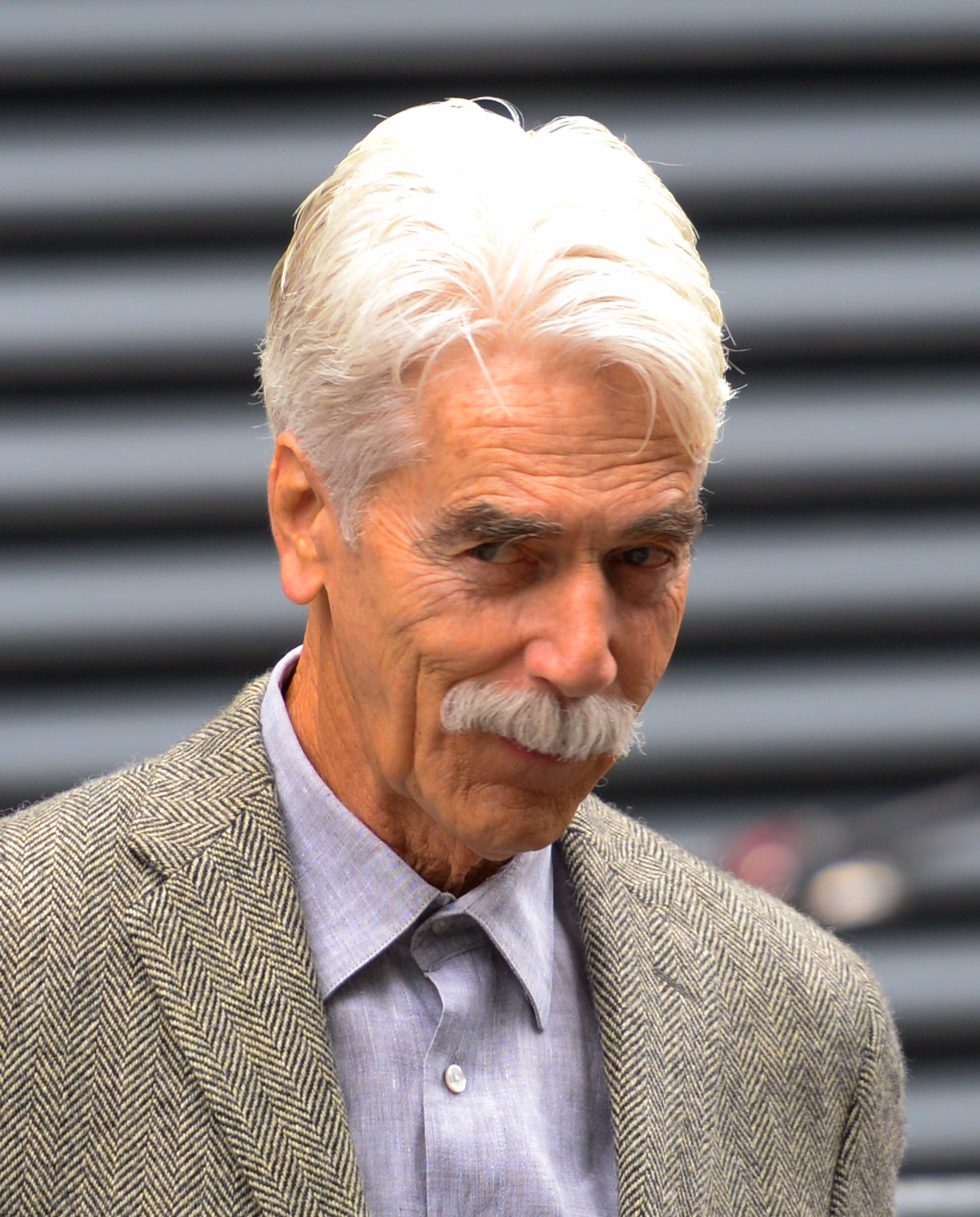
- Elliott at the 2018 Toronto International Film Festival
Award	Wins	Nominations
Academy Awards	0	1
Critics' Choice Awards	1	3
Golden Globe Awards	0	2
Primetime Emmy Awards	0	2
Screen Actors Guild Awards	1	3

American character actor Sam Elliott has received a number of awards and nominations for his screen performances. These include a Screen Actors Guild Award, a National Board of Review Award and nominations for an Academy Award, two Primetime Emmy Awards and two Golden Globe Awards.

After gaining early recognition in western films of the late 1960s and continuing into the 1970s and 1980s, Elliott received two Golden Globe Award nominations—for Best Actor in a Miniseries or Television Film and Supporting Actor in a Series, Miniseries or Television Film—for his respective roles in the television film Conagher (1991) and miniseries Buffalo Girls (1995), the latter of which also earned him a nomination for the Primetime Emmy Award for Outstanding Supporting Actor in a Miniseries or Special. His voice-over performance in Robot Chicken (2012–2020) earned him a nomination for the Primetime Emmy Award for Outstanding Voice-Over Performance. Elliott's guest role in Justified (2015) earned him a Critics' Choice Television Award for Best Guest Performer in a Drama Series.

As a member of the ensemble cast of Up in the Air (2009), Elliott was nominated for the Critics' Choice Movie Award for Best Acting Ensemble. For starring opposite Lady Gaga and Bradley Cooper in Cooper's 2018 adaptation of A Star Is Born, Elliott won the National Board of Review Award and received nominations for the AACTA International, Academy Award, Critics' Choice and SAG Award for Best Supporting Actor, as well as another nomination for the SAG Award for Outstanding Cast. His role in the Paramount+ miniseries 1883 (2021–2022) won him the SAG Award for Outstanding Actor in a Miniseries or Movie.

== Major associations ==
=== Academy Awards ===
Year	Category	Nominated work	Result	Ref.
2019	Best Supporting Actor	A Star Is Born	Nominated	

=== Golden Globe Awards ===
Year	Category	Nominated work	Result	Ref.
1992	Best Actor – Miniseries or Television Film	Conagher	Nominated	
1996	Best Supporting Actor – Series, Miniseries or Television Film	Buffalo Girls	Nominated	

=== Primetime Emmy Awards ===
Year	Category	Nominated work	Result	Ref.
1995	Outstanding Supporting Actor in a Limited Series or Movie	Buffalo Girls	Nominated	
2013	Outstanding Voice-Over Performance	Robot Chicken	Nominated	

=== Screen Actors Guild Awards ===
Year	Category	Nominated work	Result	Ref.
2019	Outstanding Performance by a Cast in a Motion Picture	A Star Is Born	Nominated	
2019	Outstanding Performance by a Male Actor in a Supporting Role	A Star Is Born	Nominated	
2023	Outstanding Performance by a Male Actor in a Television Movie or Limited Series	1883	Won	

== Other awards and nominations ==
=== AACTA Awards ===
Year	Category	Nominated work	Result	Ref.
2018	Best Supporting Actor	A Star Is Born	Nominated	

=== AARP's Movies for Grownups Awards ===
Year	Category	Nominated work	Result	Ref.
2019	Best Supporting Actor	A Star Is Born	Nominated	

=== Central Ohio Film Critics Association ===
Year	Category	Nominated work	Result	Ref.
2009	Best Ensemble	Up in the Air	2nd place	

=== Chicago Film Critics Association ===
Year	Category	Nominated work	Result	Ref.
2015	Best Supporting Actor	Grandma	Nominated	

=== Critics' Choice Movie Awards ===
Year	Category	Nominated work	Result	Ref.
2010	Best Ensemble	Up in the Air	Nominated	
2019	Best Supporting Actor	A Star Is Born	Nominated	

=== Critics' Choice Television Awards ===
Year	Category	Nominated work	Result	Ref.
2015	Best Guest Performer in a Drama Series	Justified	Won	

=== Dallas–Fort Worth Film Critics Association ===
Year	Category	Nominated work	Result	Ref.
2018	Best Supporting Actor	A Star Is Born	3rd place	

=== Detroit Film Critics Society ===
Year	Category	Nominated work	Result	Ref.
2009	Best Ensemble	Up in the Air	Nominated	
2018	Best Supporting Actor	A Star Is Born	Nominated	

=== Dorian Awards ===
Year	Category	Nominated work	Result	Ref.
2019	Supporting Film Performance of the Year — Actor	A Star Is Born	Nominated	

=== Georgia Film Critics Association ===
Year	Category	Nominated work	Result	Ref.
2018	Best Supporting Actor	A Star Is Born	Won	

=== IndieWire Critics Poll ===
Year	Category	Nominated work	Result	Ref.
2018	Best Supporting Actor	A Star Is Born	5th place	

=== Los Angeles Online Film Critics Society ===
Year	Category	Nominated work	Result	Ref.
2018	Best Supporting Actor	A Star Is Born	Nominated	

=== National Board of Review ===
Year	Category	Nominated work	Result	Ref.
2018	Best Supporting Actor	A Star Is Born	Won	

=== San Diego Film Critics Society ===
Year	Category	Nominated work	Result	Ref.
2018	Best Supporting Actor	A Star Is Born	Nominated	

=== Santa Barbara International Film Festival ===
Year	Category	Nominated work	Result	Ref.
2019	Virtuosos Award	A Star Is Born	Won	

=== Satellite Awards ===
Year	Category	Nominated work	Result	Ref.
2019	Best Supporting Actor – Motion Picture	A Star Is Born	Nominated	
2026	Best Cast – Television Series	Landman	Won	

=== Washington D.C. Area Film Critics Association ===
Year	Category	Nominated work	Result	Ref.
2009	Best Ensemble	Up in the Air	Nominated	
2018	Best Supporting Actor	A Star Is Born	Nominated	
