= Blue Jay, West Virginia =

Unincorporated community in West Virginia, United States

- Unincorporated community
- Location within West Virginia Location within the United States
- Coordinates: 37°44′13″N 81°08′16″W
- Country: United States
- State: West Virginia
- County: Raleigh
- Elevation: 2,303 ft (702 m)
- Time zone: UTC-5 (Eastern (EST))
  - Summer (DST): UTC-4 (EDT)
- ZIP codes: 25816
- Area codes: 304 & 681
- GNIS feature ID: 1553930

Blue Jay is an unincorporated community in Raleigh County, West Virginia, United States. Blue Jay is southeast of Beckley. Its mines have yielded 1,587,229 tons of coal.

== Notable person ==
- Basil L. Plumley (1920–2012), United States Army soldier portrayed by Sam Elliott in We Were Soldiers
