= The Mask of Sheba =

1970 American television film

- Written by: Sam Rolfe
- Directed by: David Lowell Rich
- Starring: Walter Pidgeon; Inger Stevens; Eric Braeden; William Marshall; Stephen Young
- Music by: Lalo Schifrin
- Country of origin: United States
- Original language: English

Production
- Producer: Sam Rolfe
- Cinematography: Gabriel Torres; Harold E. Wellman
- Editor: John D. Dunning
- Running time: 100 minutes
- Production company: MGM Television

Original release
- Network: NBC
- Release: March 9, 1970

The Mask of Sheba is a 1970 American made-for-television adventure film starring Walter Pidgeon, Inger Stevens, Eric Braeden, William Marshall and Stephen Young. It is directed by David Lowell Rich and was first broadcast on NBC on March 9, 1970.

== Plot ==
An anthropological team travels to a dense African jungle in search of missing safari members and a priceless gold statue. The journey is endangered by primitive tribesmen, treacherous territory and intrigue within the group.

== Cast ==
- Walter Pidgeon as Dr. Condon
- Inger Stevens as Sarah
- Eric Braeden as Dr. Morgan
- William Marshall as Condor
- Stephen Young as Travis
- Corinne Camacho as Joanna
- Joseph Wiseman as Bondelok
- Christopher Cary as Peter
