= Between Friends (1983 film) =

1983 American television film

- VIH cover of Between Friends
- Genre: Drama
- Based on: Nobody Makes Me Cry by Shelley List
- Written by: Shelley List; Jonathan Estrin
- Directed by: Lou Antonio
- Starring: Elizabeth Taylor; Carol Burnett
- Music by: James Horner
- Country of origin: United States
- Original language: English

Production
- Executive producers: Robert Cooper; Marian Rees
- Producers: Jonathan Estrin; Shelley List
- Production location: Toronto
- Cinematography: François Protat
- Editor: Gary Griffen
- Running time: 105 minutes
- Production company: HBO Premiere Films

Original release
- Network: HBO
- Release: September 11, 1983

Between Friends (Canadian title: Nobody Makes Me Cry) is a 1983 American-Canadian made-for-television drama film starring Elizabeth Taylor and Carol Burnett, based on the 1975 novel Nobody Makes Me Cry by Shelley List. The film premiered in the United States as Between Friends on HBO on September 11, 1983, and was broadcast in Canada as Nobody Makes Me Cry on First Choice (Pay-TV) on October 5, 1983. The film was directed by Lou Antonio.

== Plot ==
Mary Catherine Castelli is a fifty-year-old real estate agent whose husband left her for a younger woman; since then she's been making up for lost time with short term relationships with a number of men, some of whom are married. Deborah Shapiro is also middle-aged and newly divorced, though she is still coming to terms with being single again and has had little luck finding a new beau. Mary and Deborah meet literally by accident when they get into a fender bender outside Mary's office, but the two soon strike up a friendship after Deborah asks Mary to help her sell her house. Together, Mary and Deborah help each other deal with their new lives as single women, the difficulty of getting back into the dating pool, and the mildly terrifying onset of middle age and menopause.

== Cast ==
- Elizabeth Taylor as Deborah Shapiro
- Carol Burnett as Mary Catherine Castelli
- Henry Ramer as Sam Tucker
- Bruce Grey as Malcolm Hallen
- Charles Shamata as Dr. Seth Simpson
- Lally Cadeau as Lolly
- Barbara Bush as Francie
- Michael J. Reynolds as Kevin Sullivan
- Stephen Young as Martin

== Production ==
Between Friends was filmed in Toronto, Ontario, Canada from February to March 1983.

== Awards and nominations ==
Year	Award	Category	Name	Result
1984	CableACE Award	Best Actress in a Dramatic or Theatrical Program	Carol Burnett	Won
1984	CableACE Award	Best Writing in a Dramatic Program	Jonathan Estrin, Shelley List	Won
1984	CableACE Award	Best Actress in a Dramatic or Theatrical Program	Elizabeth Taylor	Nominated
