= Seaway (TV series) =

- Genre: Drama
- Created by: Abraham Polonsky
- Written by: Edward DeBlasio; Lindsay Galloway; Alvin Goldman; Ian McLellan Hunter; Charles E. Israel; Norman Klenman; Abraham Polonsky
- Directed by: John Berry; Abner Biberman; Herschel Daugherty; Lawrence Dobkin; Harvey Hart; Irving Lerner; George McCowan; Daniel Petrie; Abraham Polonsky; Gayne Rescher; Harrison Starr; Eric Till
- Starring: Stephen Young; Austin Willis; Cec Linder
- Original language: English
- No. of seasons: 1
- No. of episodes: 30

Production
- Executive producer: Maxine Samuels
- Producer: Michael Sadlier
- Production companies: Seaway Films; ATV

Original release
- Network: CBC (Canada); ATV (United Kingdom)
- Release: September 16, 1965 – September 8, 1966

Seaway is a Canadian drama television series that aired on CBC Television for the 1965–1966 season. The series was a Seaway Films production in collaboration with the UK's ATV, with production money provided by the CBC. It was presented by ASP and distributed internationally by ITC Entertainment (for international screenings ITC replaced the theme music by John Bath with another composition by Edwin Astley, and prepared a different title sequence).

Although officially Canadian, many of the show's writers and directors were American (as was the series creator/script supervisor Abraham Polonsky), with some British contributors as well (such as Ian McLellan Hunter and Donald James). The producers were the then-married couple of Michael Sadlier and Maxine Samuels, who had created a popular children’s adventure series The Forest Rangers.

With extensive film location shooting, it was the most expensive series produced in Canada to that time with a total cost of $3 million ($13.5 million today), and although it did well enough for the CBC in terms of viewers, a hoped-for sale to American network television never happened because the series was shot in black-and-white, and U.S. network shows by that time were increasingly being made in color (with fewer and fewer exceptions). Only the two final two-part episodes of Seaway, "Don't Forget to Wipe the Blood Off" and "Gunpowder and Paint," were filmed in color.

== Overview ==
Seaway followed the adventures of Nick King (played by Stephen Young) who works as a ship owners' agent, investigating crimes involving shipping. He is assisted by Department of Transport agent retired Admiral Leslie Fox (Austin Willis), and the special police force patrolling the Saint Lawrence Seaway, which had opened in 1959. Episodes were filmed in various locations along the seaway, primarily Toronto and Montreal. They were generally set in Canada, although the two-parter "Gunpowder and Paint" was partially set in Cleveland (though filmed in Toronto).

== Cast ==
- Stephen Young as Nick King
- Austin Willis as Admiral Fox
- Cec Linder as Inspector Provist

Willis and Linder had both appeared the year before in the international hit film Goldfinger. Notable guest stars included Canadian actor Gordon Pinsent, Canada-based British actor Barry Morse (who was appearing in The Fugitive at the time), Sally Kellerman, Faye Dunaway in one of her first screen appearances, Lynda Day George, Susan Oliver, and Richard Thomas.

== Episodes ==
This list is in broadcast order, as broadcast on the CBC according to TV listings guides. A pair of episodes (Don't Forget to Wipe the Blood Off) were edited together into a feature film entitled Affair with a Killer.

Episode #	Episode title
1-1	"Shipment from Marseilles"
1-2	"Last Voyage"
1-3	"Border Incident"
1-4	"What the Rats Knew"
1-5	"The Only Good Indian"
1-6	"34th Man"
1-7	"The Provocative Mademoiselle"
1-8	"Bonhomme Richard"
1-9	"Nothing But A Long Goodbye"
1-10	"Abraham's Hand"
1-11	"Mutiny"
1-12	"A Medal for Mirko"
1-13	"Port of Call: Paradise"
1-14	"Trial by Fire"
1-15	"The Wharf Rat"
1-16	"Over the Falls"
1-17	"Maria"
1-18	"The Sparrows"
1-19	"Ghost Ship"
1-20	"Dead Reckoning"
1-21	"Billy the Kid"
1-22	"The Viking"
1-23	"Hot Line"
1-24	"The Last Free Man"
1-25	"Sinking of the Elizabeth Rainey"
1-26	"Rx for Murder"
1-27	"Don't Forget to Wipe the Blood Off, Part One"*
1-28	"Don't Forget to Wipe the Blood Off, Part Two"*
1-29	"Gunpowder and Paint, Part One"*
1-30	"Gunpowder and Paint (Part Two)"*

*Episodes made in color

The transmission and/or production order of the following episodes is unknown. It can be assumed these episodes slot into the gaps in the above list.

- "Nothing but a Long Goodbye"
- "The Sparrows"
- "A Medal for Mirko"
- "Abraham's Hand"

== International broadcast ==
The Australian rights are held by the Nine Network who, over many decades, have shown numerous repeats in non-peak viewing times. Since 2012 and continuing in 2025, there have been numerous showings in the early hours of the morning on Gem, a Nine Network digital outlet, sometimes twice per morning. Until November 2017, the Seaway repeats alternated with re-screenings of two British series Gideon's Way and Danger Man.
