= Stephen Young (actor) =

Canadian actor, producer and TV host (born 1939)

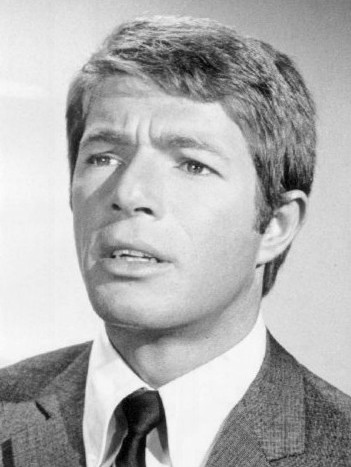
- Young in Judd for the Defense (1969)
- Born: Stephen Levy; May 19, 1939 (age 87); Toronto, Ontario, Canada
- Occupations: Actor; producer; television host
- Years active: 1963–2013

Stephen Young (born Stephen Levy; May 19, 1939) is a retired Canadian actor and television host. He worked mostly as a character actor and had supporting roles in the films Patton (1970), Soylent Green (1973), and The Silent Partner (1978).

== Early life and education ==
Young was born in Toronto, Ontario to a financier father. He attended high school at Forest Hill Collegiate Institute where he was student president. Afterwards, he signed with the Cleveland Indians, but his professional bid ended when he seriously injured his knee playing ice hockey. He spent the next few years as a salesman, then wound up in radio and TV commercial production.

== Career ==
While travelling with a friend on a European excursion in the early 1960s, Young by chance got a bit part in the epic Cleopatra (1963), then landed similar minor assignments in such other European-filmed epics as 55 Days at Peking (1963), The Leopard (1963), The Fall of the Roman Empire (1964), and The Thin Red Line (1964).

Upon returning to Toronto, Young decided to become a full-time actor, originally billing himself under his birth name and appearing in leads on both daytime and primetime TV dramas, including the Toronto-based daytime serial Moment of Truth. He headed the cast of the Canadian adventure series Seaway. Moving to Hollywood in 1966, he subsequently starred as young lawyer Ben Caldwell, assistant to high-profile criminal attorney Clinton Judd (Carl Betz) in the drama Judd, for the Defense. The series was abruptly cancelled after only two seasons. Stephen Young also guest-starred in the cult science fiction TV series The Starlost in the episode "Astro-Medics" (1973).

Young's theatrical film role appearances include Patton (1970), Soylent Green (1970), Rage (1972), Lifeguard (1976), Deadline (1980), and his final appearance in the 2013 low budget independent film The Angel Inn.

Young was a friend of John Candy and worked together on a few projects, including a lead role in the low-budget horror thriller The Clown Murders (1976), as well as the Interior Decorator in Who's Harry Crumb? (1989), and Freddie in The Silent Partner (1978), the latter of which he also produced.

He appeared in television films, including the low-budget project The Mask of Sheba (1969), The Death Squad (1974), Between Friends (1983), A Perry Mason Mystery: The Case of the Jealous Jokester (1995), Strange Justice and Execution of Justice, both in 1999, and The Last Debate (2000).

Young briefly hosted the Canadian game show Just Like Mom (1980–81).

In addition to recurring roles, Young guest starred, playing characters for a number of popular Canadian and American television series including The Mod Squad (1972), the character Dallet on both The Six Million Dollar Man and The Bionic Woman (1976), two episodes of The Littlest Hobo (1979, 1981), Magnum, P.I. (1983), Danger Bay (1985), Airwolf (1987), and In The Heat of the Night (1991), among others. In 1993, on the Canadian crime-fighting series Counterstrike, Young portrayed Senator David Carmichael who dies on an icy road while being chased by journalists working for Morton Downey Jr.'s character Monroe Park, who slandered him on his controversial news-talk show The Raw Truth. He also appeared in the Canadian series Traders (1997), followed by the 2002 television film A Portrait of Murder (also known as The Rendering) playing Detective Nick Sousa.

== Filmography ==
=== Film ===
- 1963: Cleopatra (bit part)
- 1963: The Leopard
- 1963: 55 Days at Peking – Dying British Marine (uncredited)
- 1964: The Thin Red Line – Stack (as Stephen Levy)
- 1967: Affair with a Killer (Seaway episode "Don't Forget to Wipe the Blood Off" theatrical release) – Nick King
- 1970: Patton – Captain Chester B. Hansen
- 1972: Rage – Maj. Reintz
- 1973: Soylent Green – Gilbert
- 1976: Breaking Point – Peter Stratas
- 1976: Lifeguard – Larry
- 1976: The Clown Murders – Charlie
- 1978: The Silent Partner – Freddie (as Stephen Levy)
- 1979: The Little Dragons – Lunsford
- 1980: Deadline – Steven Lessey
- 1982: Spring Fever – Neil Berryman
- 1989: Who's Harry Crumb? – Interior Decorator
- 1989: Not Another Mistake (Cross Fire) – Jasper
- 1990: The Gumshoe Kid – Cop
- 1994: Scorned – Mason Wainwright
- 2002: The Skulls II (video) – Senator George Milford
- 2007: Charlie Bartlett – Dr. Stan Weathers
- 2013: The Angel Inn – Arrogant Bum

=== Television ===
Stephen Young television credits
Year	Title	Role	Notes	Ref.
1965–1966	Seaway	Nick King	30 episodes	
1966	12 O'Clock High	Captain Jerry Clinton	1 episode	
1967-1969	Judd, for the Defense	Ben Caldwell	49 episodes	
1969	The Mask of Sheba	Travis Comanche	TV movie	
1972	The Mod Squad	Kip Hanson	1 episode	
1972	Oh, Nurse!	Jimmy, Intern	TV movie	
1972	The ABC Afternoon Playbreak	Mike Rodman	Episode: "This Child Is Mine"	
1973	The Starlost (The Invasion)	Dr. Chris	Episode: "Astro-Medics"	
1974	The Death Squad	Lieutenant Andrece	TV movie	
1975	Police Woman	Ray Bradford	1 episode	
1975, 1976	The Streets of San Francisco	Dwayne Rogers / Father Wilson	2 episodes	
1976	McMillan & Wife	Lt. Don Corbett	1 episode	
1976	The Six Million Dollar Man	Dallet	1 episode	
1976	The Bionic Woman	Dallett	1 episode	
1977	Hawaii Five-O	Quincy	Episode: "To Die in Paradise"	
1978	CHiPs	Gerald Billings	1 episode	
1979, 1981	The Littlest Hobo	Scott Phillips / Lloyd Wells	2 episodes	
1981	Hart to Hart	Sgt. Cosgrove	Episode: "Homemade Murder"	
1982	Trapper John, M.D.	Tom	1 episode	
1982	Portrait of a Showgirl	Congressman	TV movie	
1983	Between Friends	Martin	TV movie	
1983	Magnum, P.I.	Don Cassidy	1 episode	
1984	Love Leads the Way: A True Story	Mike Mcshane	TV movie	
1985	Picking Up the Pieces	Asst. Principal Josh Cole	TV movie	
1985	Danger Bay	Clemmons	1 episode	
1987	Airwolf	Martin Lundahl	1 episode	
1987	21 Jump Street	R.B. Greaves	1 episode	
1988	Hunter	Senator Alan Young	1 episode	
1990	Murder, She Wrote	Ernie Dolan	1 episode	
1991	In The Heat of the Night	Mike Lawrence	1 episode	
1993	Counterstrike	Senator David Carmichael	Episode: "The Raw Truth"	
1995	A Perry Mason Mystery: The Case of the Jealous Jokester	Unknown	TV movie	
1997	Traders	Douglas Walker	Episode: "Family Legacy"	
1998	When Husbands Cheat	Peter Fisher	TV movie	
1999	Strange Justice	Sen. Danforth	TV movie	
1999	Execution of Justice	George Moscone	TV movie	
2000	The Last Debate	Richard Meredith	TV movie	
2002	A Portrait of Murder (The Rendering)	Det. Nick Sousa	TV movie	
