= Barbara Tyson =

Canadian actress (born 1964)

- Born: Barbara Bush; October 1, 1964 (age 62)
- Other name: Barbara Bush
- Occupation: Actress
- Years active: 1982–present
- Website: http://www.barbaratyson.com

Barbara Tyson (born October 1, 1964) is a Canadian actress known for appearing in hit TV series Neon Rider, Cold Squad, ER and The Twilight Zone. One of her first notable television roles was in Another World as Dawn "Ivy" Rollo, the first HIV-positive character to be introduced in a daytime soap opera in the United States. She was credited as Barbara Bush in her early roles.

Originally from Capreol, Ontario, she moved with her mother several times in childhood after her parents' divorce, finally spending her teen years in Barrie, Ontario. Her first-ever acting audition was for a role in the Donald Sutherland film Threshold, which went to Mare Winningham. She had early guest roles in Canadian television, and appeared as Mary Catherine Castelli (Carol Burnett)'s daughter Francie in the television film Between Friends, before moving to New York City in 1985. She had just $1.87 in her savings account the day she won her role in Another World. After that role ended, she continued to appear in guest roles before securing her starring role in the Canadian series Neon Rider, which lasted for four seasons.

She was nominated for a Gemini Award for Best Guest Performance in a Series by an Actor or Actress at the 8th Gemini Awards in 1994 for a guest appearance in North of 60.

== Filmography ==
- 1982 Hangin' In as Babs (1 episode)
- 1983 Between Friends (TV) as Francie Castelli
- 1985 Night Heat as Susan Taylor (1 episode)
- 1985 The Edison Twins as Janis (2 episodes)
- 1987–1988 Another World (1964) TV series as Dawn "Ivy" Rollo (unknown episodes)
- 1989 Charles in Charge as Veronica Radford (1 episode)
- 1989 The Famous Teddy Z (1 episode)
- 1989 Murphy Brown as Secretary #22 (1 episode)
- 1990 Ernest Goes to Jail as Charlotte Sparrow
- 1990 Alien Nation as Lorraine Clark (2 episodes)
- 1990 The Fanelli Boys as Miss Hollister (1 episode)
- 1990 Pacific Heights as Amy
- 1991–1992 Sweating Bullets as Glenda Lee Haggerty / Kit (2 episodes)
- 1991–1994 Neon Rider as Eleanor James (39 episodes)
- 1992 Blossom as Diane (1 episode)
- 1993–1994 North of 60 as Lindy Olssen (2 episodes)
- 1994 M.A.N.T.I.S. as Terry Mills (1 episode)
- 1994 Highlander: The Series as Barbara Waverly (1 episode)
- 1995 The Final Cut as Veronica Waller
- 1995 ER as Mrs. Brown (1 episode)
- 1995 Mixed Blessings (TV) as Gayle
- 1996 To Brave Alaska (TV) as Barbara DeCreeft
- 1996 Two as FBI Agent Theresa "Terry" Carter (most episodes)
- 1996 Remembrance (TV) (voice) as Adult Vanessa
- 1996 Poltergeist: The Legacy as Miranda Blake (1 episode)
- 1997 Viper as Stephanie Sloan (1 episode)
- 1998 Baby Monitor: Sound of Fear (TV) as Carol Whitson
- 1999 Resurrection as Sara Prudhomme
- 1999 Nash Bridges as Gretchen Hale (1 episode)
- 2000 The Christmas Secret (TV) as Sasha
- 2000 So Weird as Sarah (1 episode)
- 2000 Running Mates (TV) as Newscaster #3
- 2000 Beautiful Joe as Sylvie
- 2000 Ratz (TV) as Judy Weingarten
- 2000 First Wave as Dr. Mira Ruben (1 episode)
- 2000 The Pretender as Robin Gantry (1 episode)
- 2000 Final Destination as Barbara Browning
- 2001 Andromeda as Voice Artist (1 episode)
- 2001 Mysterious Ways as Leslie Gilmour (1 episode)
- 2001 Trapped (TV) as Lauren Gertz
- 2002 Just Cause as Courtney Van Dam (1 episode)
- 2002 Cheats as Mrs. Herman
- 2002 John Doe as Ruthless District Attorney (1 episode)
- 2002 The Twilight Zone as Hilary McGreevey (1 episode)
- 2002 K-9: P.I. as Catherine
- 1995–2002 The Outer Limits as Carrie Emerson (3 episodes)
- 2002 The Chris Isaak Show as Joanna (1 episode)
- 2003 Jake 2.0 as Elena Dankova (1 episode)
- 2003 Peacemakers as Luci Prescott (9 episodes)
- 2004 5ive Days to Midnight (TV) as Mandy Murphy
- 2005 The Collector as Business Woman (1 episode)
- 2001–2005 Cold Squad as Emily/Rene Tyson (2 episodes)
- 2006 The 4400 as Lucy Gelder (1 episode)
- 2006 Falcon Beach as Peggy (1 episode)
- 2007 Battle in Seattle as Anna
- 2007 Painkiller Jane as Betty Boone (1 episode)
- 2007 Luna: Spirit of the Whale (TV) as Lucy
- 2007 A.M.P.E.D. as Mrs. Alessi (1 episode)
- 2008 Fear Itself as Candace (1 episode)
- 2009 Wolf Canyon (TV) as Carol/Mayor Wyatt
- 2009 Revolution (TV) as Anna
- 2009 Trust (TV) as Francis
- 2009 The Egg Factory as Ellen
- 2012 Barbie in A Mermaid Tale 2 as Ambassador Selena
- 2013 The Haunting in Connecticut 2: Ghosts of Georgia as Reporter #2
- 2016 Love on the Sidelines (TV movie) as Julie Holland
- 2016 Little Pink House as Paulette Vecchiarelli
- 2025 "Final Destination Bloodlines" as Margarita Montiel a Sky View Survivor
