= Resurrection (1999 film) =

- Original film poster
- Directed by: Russell Mulcahy
- Written by: Brad Mirman
- Story by: Christopher Lambert; Brad Mirman
- Produced by: Howard Baldwin; Christopher Lambert; Patrick Choi; Nile Niami
- Starring: Christopher Lambert; Robert Joy; Barbara Tyson; Rick Fox; Leland Orser
- Cinematography: Jonathan Freeman
- Edited by: Gordon McClellan
- Music by: James McGrath
- Production companies: Baldwin/Cohen Productions; Interlight Pictures; Resurrection Productions Inc.
- Distributed by: Columbia TriStar Home Video
- Release date: March 1999 (Brussels International Festival of Fantasy Films)
- Running time: 108 minutes
- Countries: Canada; United States
- Language: English
- Budget: $15 million

Resurrection is a 1999 Police procedural horror film directed by Russell Mulcahy and starring Christopher Lambert, Leland Orser and Robert Joy. David Cronenberg appears in a cameo as a priest. Lambert co-wrote the story for the film with Brad Mirman, who also wrote the screenplay. The film was theatrically released in most of Europe, Asia and Australia, but went straight to DVD in the US. It was also occasionally aired/streamed on television.

== Plot ==
Detective John Prudhomme, a Cajun transferred to Chicago, and his partner Hollinsworth are assigned to investigate the savage murder of a man whose left arm has been sawed off and taken. A message, "He Is Coming", is found written in lamb's blood on the victim's window. After another victim is discovered with a missing right arm, the detectives realise they are dealing with a serial killer.

The third victim to be found has his head removed. After studying the roman numerals found carved into the victims by the killer, Prudhomme realises that when combined with the victims' names (Matthew, Peter and James), these numerals are citing Bible verses related to the resurrection of Jesus. Prudhomme theorises that the killer plans to use the body parts he has taken to reconstruct the "Body of Christ" in time for Easter. This explains why each victim is 33 years old (Jesus was 33 at his death) and why the killer is ensuring that the victims are conscious when he kills them (Christ was conscious when he suffered). An FBI profiler named Wingate arrives and offers additional insights into the killer's mental state.

Armed with this new information, Prudhomme and Hollinsworth are able to predict the killer's next target. When they interrupt the killing and give chase, Hollinsworth is tasered by the killer and shot in the leg by the police, after being set up by the killer. The injury to his leg necessitates its amputation, resulting in it later being stolen by the killer. The killer leaves a message for Prudhomme, chiding him for interfering with the last killing and saying that for penance, Prudhomme's wife Sara must die. Prudhomme rushes home to find a mutilated corpse, but it is revealed to be Sara's visiting sister, and Sara herself is safe.

With Hollinsworth hospitalised and unable to help him, Prudhomme turns to detectives Scholfield and Moltz, with whom he has had a contentious relationship, for help. The team finds a fifth victim in a slaughterhouse, missing his leg, meaning that the killer needs only a torso to complete his work. Scholfield discovers an FBI record of a similar murder several years earlier in Tennessee—Prudhomme is irate that they did not get this record from Wingate, who had promised to send all the Bureau's information. When Prudhomme goes to the FBI's office, he finds Wingate, who is a different man than the apparent profiler his team has been working with.

Knowing that the fake Wingate is the killer, Prudhomme and his team lay a trap and arrest the impostor for impersonating a police officer. The impostor's name is Demus, and he mocks the police because they cannot connect him to any murder. The judge for the case sets bond at only $20,000, which Demus pays. Although officers shadow the released Demus to the Chicago Union Station, in the restroom he escapes by changing clothes and crawling under the stalls.

Prudhomme's team is able to connect Demus' fingerprints to the earlier murder in Tennessee, meaning they can now arrest him. They discover that he had been institutionalised for several years, only having been released two months ago. Meanwhile, Demus kills his sixth victim, taking the torso. Prudhomme theorises that Demus may be hiding somewhere they already looked, and in the house of the first victim, they find the gruesome remains of his victims, arranged to resemble a crucified Christ. Looking over Demus' notes, Prudhomme realises that to complete his work, the killer plans to take the heart of a baby born from a woman named Mary on Easter, which is the following day. Moltz identifies a newly born baby from a Mary, and they rush to that hospital, where they find Demus with the baby. Moltz is wounded and Prudhomme chases Demus to the rooftop. He shoots Demus and catches the baby. Demus falls from the rooftop to his death.

Some time later, Prudhomme visits a recovering Hollinsworth, who is learning to walk on a prosthetic leg and promises to return to the job better than ever.

== Cast ==
- Christopher Lambert as Det. John Prudhomme
- Leland Orser as Det. Andrew Hollinsworth
- Robert Joy as Agent Wingate / Gerald Demus
- Barbara Tyson as Sara Prudhomme
- Rick Fox as Scholfield
- David Cronenberg as Father Rousell
- Jonathan Potts as Detective Moltz
- Peter MacNeill as Captain Whippley
- Philip Williams as Detective Rousch
- Jayne Eastwood as Dolores Koontz
- David Ferry as Mr. Breslauer
- Chaz Thorne as David Elkins
- Darren Enkin as John Ordway
- Michael Olah as Michael Prudhomme
- Ray Vernon as Real Agent Wingate

== Production ==
An international co-production between Canada and The United States. Some of the film was shot in Chicago, Illinois and New Orleans, Louisiana, but most of it was filmed in Toronto, Canada.

According to director Russell Mulcahy's DVD commentary Resurrection was originally rated NC-17, which is why several scenes of violence and gore, like the leg cutting scene, were excised to achieve an R rating. The "Uncut version" of the film was never released and is presumed lost to this day.

== Release ==
Resurrection was broadcast on HBO on June 25, 1999 followed by a home video release on November 9, 1999.

In other countries such as France, Spain and Switzerland, it was shown in theatres. In France it was a modest success, with nearly 400,000 film admissions. The film was quite popular in Spain, with 1,198,684 admissions.

=== Critical reception ===
Critical reception for the film has been mixed. Marc Bernardin of Entertainment Weekly called the film "woefully derivative" but "well-crafted."

John Fallon of Arrow in the Head called it "one of the more entertaining serial killer movies on the block." Fallon added, "If you can get past the similarities with Seven, you will surely enjoy this razor sharp, nasty flick." Chuck O'Leary of FulvueDrive-in.com said the film is "a blatant rip-off of Seven, but pretty scary and unsettling in its own right."

Carlo Cavagna of About Film called Resurrection "an entertaining movie," remarking that "the cinematography is quite good by any standard, and the writing is decent enough to keep you interested." Cavagna felt that the plot was "by-the-numbers," but added that it [has] a new twist on the killer's motivation."
