= Basil L. Plumley =

United States Army soldier

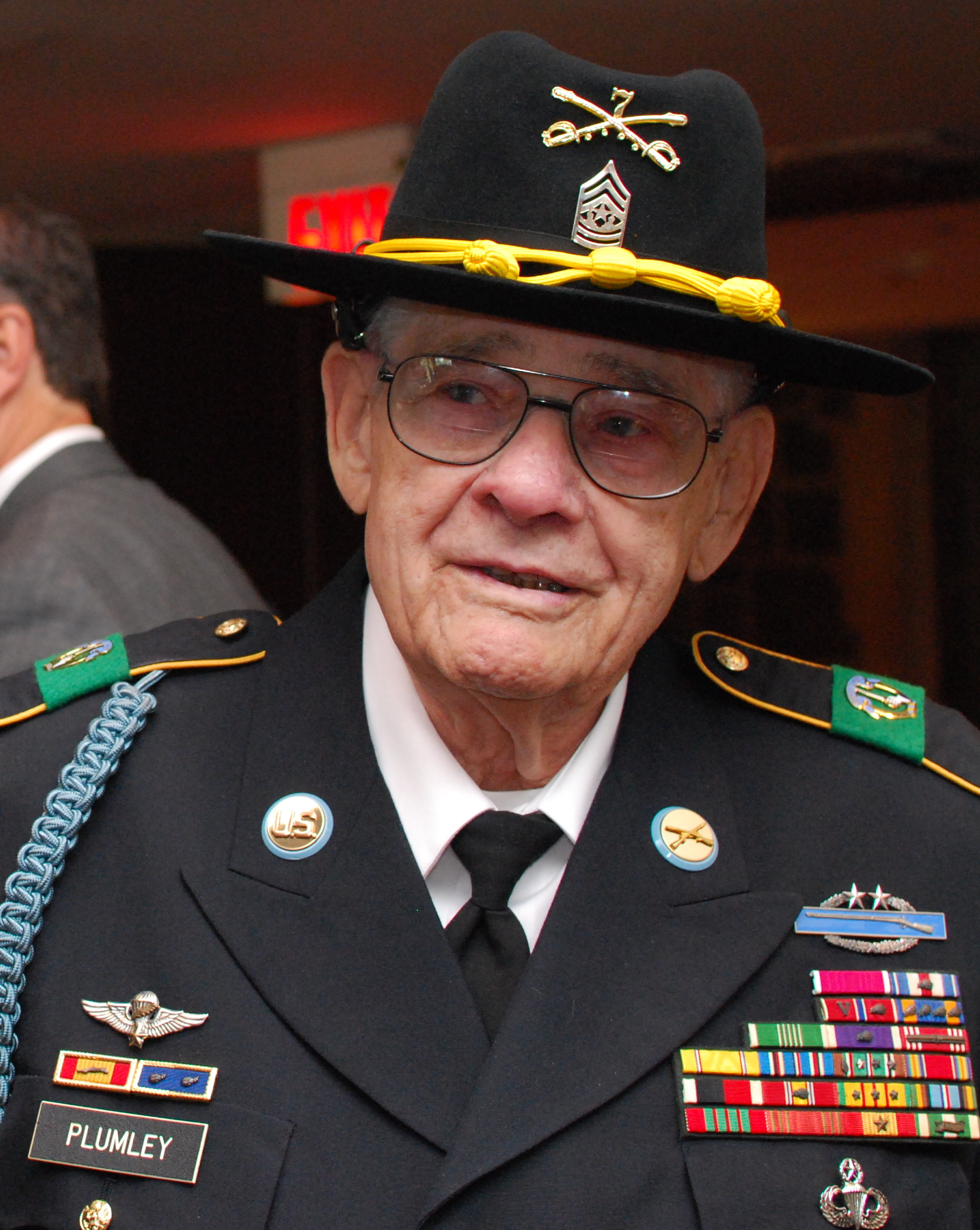
- Plumley at West Point in 2010
- Born: Basil Leonard Plumley; January 1, 1920; Blue Jay, West Virginia, U.S.
- Died: October 10, 2012 (aged 92); Columbus, Georgia, U.S.
- Burial place: Fort Benning Main Post Cemetery
- Spouse: Deurice Dillon (m. 1949; died 2012)
- Military career
- Branch: United States Army
- Service years: 1942–1974
- Rank: Command sergeant major
- Units: 82nd Airborne Division; 187th Airborne Infantry Regiment; 7th Cavalry Regiment
- Conflicts: See battles: World War II; Battle of Sicily; Salerno Landings; Battle of Normandy; Operation Market Garden; Korean War; Vietnam War; Battle of Ia Drang
- Awards: Silver Star; Legion of Merit; Bronze Star Medal (2); Purple Heart (2)

Basil Leonard Plumley (January 1, 1920 – October 10, 2012) was an American soldier who served in the United States Army for over three decades, rising to the rank of command sergeant major. He was a combat veteran of World War II, the Korean War and the Vietnam War, and is most noted for his actions during the Battle of Ia Drang in Vietnam.

== Early life ==
Basil Leonard Plumley was born on January 1, 1920, in Blue Jay, West Virginia, one of six children born to coal miner Clay Plumley and his wife Georgia. After two years of high school, he worked as a chauffeur and truck driver before joining the U.S. Army on March 31, 1942.

== Military career ==
In World War II, Plumley served with the 82nd Airborne Division, fighting in the division's assaults of Sicily and Salerno in Italy in 1943, and the invasion of Normandy in France and Operation Market Garden in the Netherlands in 1944. He ended the war at the rank of sergeant. During the Korean War, Plumley served with the 187th Airborne Infantry Regiment. He was promoted to the rank of sergeant major in 1961.

In the Vietnam War, Plumley served as sergeant major of the 1st Battalion, 7th Cavalry Regiment, under the command of Lieutenant Colonel Harold G. Moore, with whom he shared a close working relationship. Moore described Plumley as a "no-bullshit guy who believed, as I did, in tough training, tough discipline, and tough physical conditioning...I thank my lucky stars I had inherited such a treasure." At the Battle of Ia Drang in 1965, 450 troops of the 7th Cavalry Regiment fought some 2,000 soldiers of the People's Army of Vietnam, the first major battle of the war between U.S. and North Vietnamese forces. Plumley fought at Landing Zone X-Ray, where 79 American soldiers were killed. During the battle, Plumley grabbed a burning flare that had landed in a stack of ammunition crates near the battalion command post and threw it to safety, an action that earned him the Silver Star.

Plumley retired from the Army on December 31, 1974, at the rank of command sergeant major. After leaving the Army, Plumley worked for 15 years as an administrative assistant at Martin Army Community Hospital in Fort Benning, Georgia.

=== Controversy over service record ===
In 2016, The Washington Post reported that an independent military researcher, Brian Siddall, had examined Plumley's service records and discovered discrepancies between the awards that Plumley had worn and those he had been officially authorized to wear. For example, Plumley wore two Silver Stars and three Combat Infantryman Badges, while an official U.S. Army inquiry found that he was authorized to wear one Silver Star and one Combat Infantryman Badge. The newspaper deemed it "perplexing" that a "proven combat leader" like Plumley would wear medals he apparently did not earn. Colonel Andy Hilmes, the garrison commander at Fort Benning, acknowledged discrepancies between official Army records and the awards listed on Plumley's headstone, prompting officials at Fort Benning to undertake an investigation. The U.S. Army Human Resources Command ultimately ruled that while "there are discrepancies" in Plumley's record, "there is no substantial evidence that any of CSM (R) Basil Plumley's awards or decorations are in error." Siddall called this inaction a "cover up" and accused the Army of concealing fraud.

In addition to disputing Plumley's decorations, Siddall also found discrepancies in Plumley's service record regarding his postings and participation in combat. Based on his research, Siddall wrote that Plumley served in the 82nd Airborne Division as a scout in the 320th Glider Field Artillery Battalion, not as a paratrooper, contradicting the claim in Hal Moore's book We Were Soldiers Once… and Young that Plumley made four parachute jumps in World War II. Siddall wrote that Plumley, as member of the Field Artillery Branch, was ineligible for the Combat Infantryman Badge for his World War II service. Siddall further wrote that records show Plumley was stationed at Fort Campbell and in Germany for the entirety of the Korean War, not arriving in Korea until a 1972 posting, in contrast to Moore's assertion that Plumley made an additional combat jump in Korea.

== Personal life and death ==
In 1949, Plumley married Deurice Dillon, with whom he had a daughter. They remained together until Deurice's death in May 2012. Plumley died of colon cancer in Columbus, Georgia, on October 10, 2012, at the age of 92.

Plumley is a prominent figure in Lieutenant General Hal Moore's 1992 book We Were Soldiers Once… and Young, which chronicles the Battle of Ia Drang. In the 2002 film adaptation, Plumley is portrayed by Sam Elliott.

== Awards and decorations ==
Per a 2015 memo, the U.S. Army verified that Plumley was entitled to wear the following decorations:

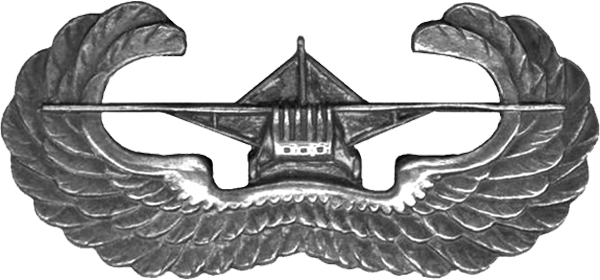

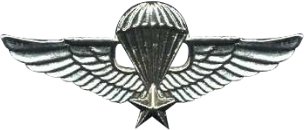

Badges	Combat Infantryman Badge		Master Parachutist Badge	
Badges	Glider Badge		Vietnam Master Parachutist Badge	
1st Row	Silver Star		Legion of Merit	
2nd Row	Bronze Star Medal with one oak leaf cluster	Purple Heart with one oak leaf cluster	Air Medal with bronze award numeral 7	Army Commendation Medal with three oak leaf clusters
3rd Row	Army Good Conduct Medal; 8 awards	American Campaign Medal	European-African-Middle Eastern Campaign Medal with arrowhead device, silver and bronze service stars	World War II Victory Medal
4th Row	Army of Occupation Medal with "Germany" clasp	National Defense Service Medal with service star	Armed Forces Expeditionary Medal	Vietnam Service Medal with silver and three bronze service stars
5th Row	Korea Defense Service Medal	Gallantry Cross with gold star (South Vietnam)	Armed Forces Honor Medal; Second class (South Vietnam)	Vietnam Campaign Medal (South Vietnam)
Unit Citations	Army Presidential Unit Citation with oak leaf cluster	RVN Gallantry Cross Unit Citation		Civil Actions Medal Unit Citation
Fourragerès	French Fourragère	Belgian Fourragère		Netherlands Orange Lanyard
