= Lifeguard (film) =

1976 film by Daniel Petrie

- Theatrical release poster
- Directed by: Daniel Petrie
- Written by: Ron Koslow
- Produced by: Ron Silverman
- Starring: Sam Elliott; Anne Archer; Stephen Young; Parker Stevenson; Kathleen Quinlan
- Cinematography: Ralph Woolsey
- Edited by: Art J. Nelson
- Music by: Dale Menten
- Production company: Paramount Pictures
- Distributed by: Paramount Pictures
- Release date: July 23, 1976
- Running time: 96 minutes
- Country: United States
- Language: English
- Budget: $900,000
- Box office: $5.4 million

Lifeguard is a 1976 American romantic drama film directed by Daniel Petrie from a screenplay by Ron Koslow. It stars Sam Elliott, Anne Archer, Stephen Young, Parker Stevenson, and Kathleen Quinlan. The film follows Rick Carlson, a Southern California lifeguard who is prompted to reexamine his life when he attends his high school reunion.

== Plot ==
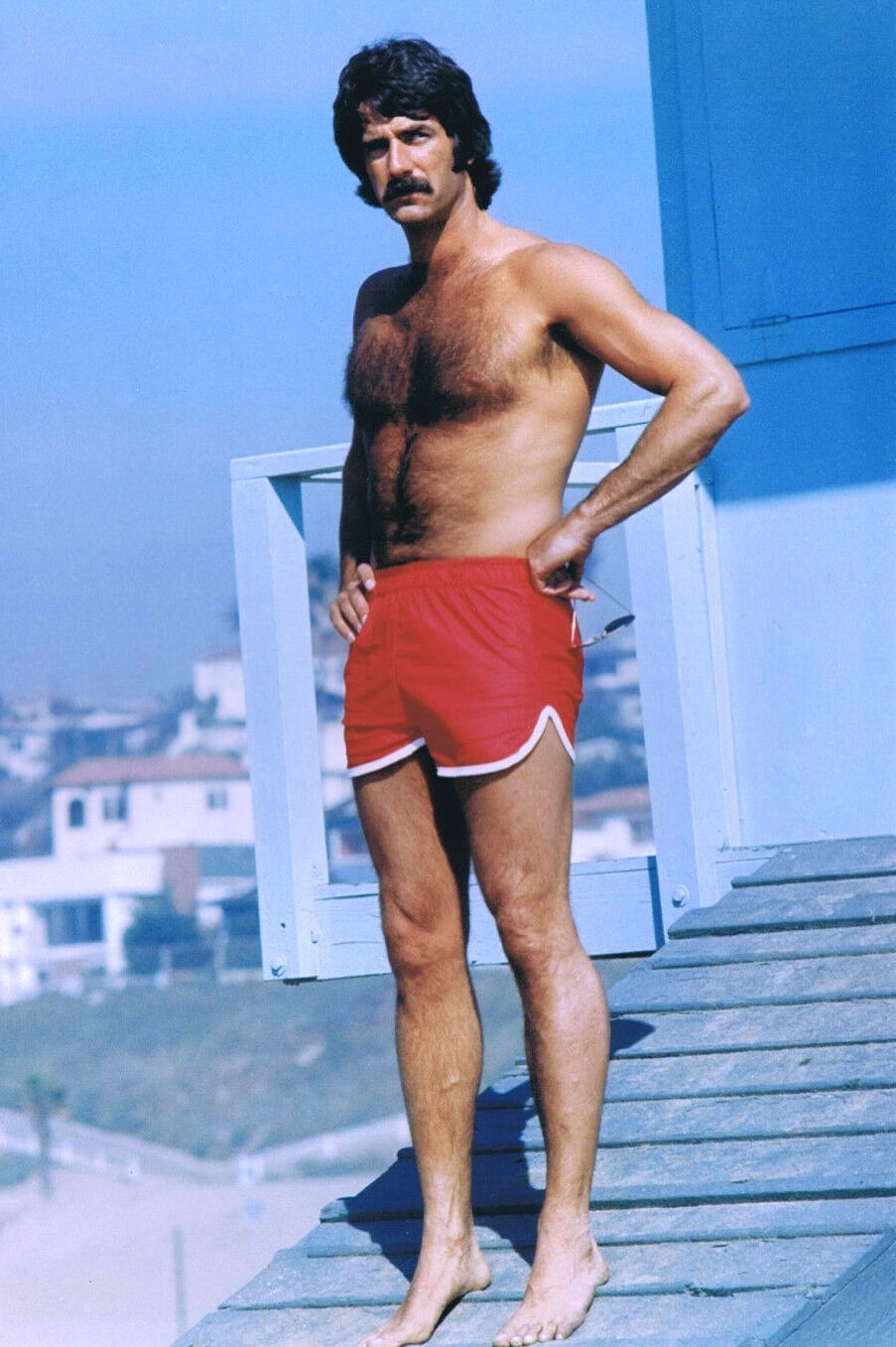
Sam Elliott in his breakthrough role as Rick Carlson

Rick Carlson, a 32-year-old career lifeguard in Southern California, enjoys a commitment-free life of casual relationships. For the summer, he trains Chris Randolph, a college student and temporary weekend assistant. Despite being content with his profession, Rick is needled by his father to get a "real job" that pays more. One day, Rick receives an invitation to his 15-year high school reunion in the mail.

While on duty, Rick is approached by Wendy, a 17-year-old girl who has moved to the area from San Diego with her family. Wendy develops an infatuation with Rick. Though wary of returning her affections as she is underage, Rick remains friendly with her. He encounters Larry, an old high school friend who is now a partner in a Porsche dealership. Larry brings up the school reunion and says that Rick's old high school flame, the newly divorced Cathy, is expected to attend. Larry also offers Rick a sales position at the dealership, suggesting that he can double his salary. Hoping to see Cathy, Rick decides to go to the reunion.

Meanwhile, Wendy continues to pursue Rick. At her insistence, Rick eventually gives in to Wendy and has sex with her in the lifeguard tower. On the night of the reunion, Wendy surprises Rick at his apartment door before he leaves. He invites her in and she is surprised to discover that he is in his 30s. She then says that she understands his concern over their age difference.

At the reunion, former classmates discuss their careers. Rick seems embarrassed about still being a lifeguard and begins to lie about why he is so tanned, claiming that he works an outdoors job for the county. He reunites with Cathy and learns that she works at an art gallery and has a young son. Rick and Cathy rekindle their relationship. The next day, Rick and Chris compete in the annual lifeguard relay races, but Rick is outrun by younger competitors. Rick shows up to interview at the Porsche dealership. Rick impresses Mr. Gilmore, Larry's partner, with how seriously he takes his lifeguard job.

After a brief absence, Wendy returns to the beach and asks Rick when they will be intimate again. He says that they are doing something illegal and that it would be best if she found someone closer to her own age. Rick also admits that he is with someone else when Wendy prods him about another woman. He tries to comfort a distraught Wendy. Days later, he sees Wendy swimming away from the beach and goes to rescue her. She admits that she is trying to kill herself. He takes Wendy to shore and walks her to her car. He reassures her that, when school starts Monday, she will "begin to make new friends" before she drives off.

Shocked, Rick visits Cathy at the art gallery to tell her about the incident with Wendy. Cathy comforts him, then invites him to move in with her. While they are discussing the arrangement, a male client continually insists that Cathy wait on him. An annoyed Rick loudly tells the man off, jeopardizing Cathy's standing at the gallery. Rick apologizes to Cathy for losing his cool and says that he will think over the living situation.

With the summer season winding down, Larry returns to the beach one more time to offer Rick a job selling Porsches. Rick turns it down definitively, despite realizing that it will probably mean an end to his relationship with Cathy, who has been encouraging him to become more upwardly mobile. He tells Larry that he will remain a lifeguard "just as long as they'll have me". On his last day on the assistant job, Chris thanks Rick for everything he taught him.

Rick is later summoned to the beach changing room as a hysterical woman says that there is a man in there. Rick asks the man what he is doing in the ladies' room. The man claims to be a police officer working surveillance and says that he does not have his badge because he is working undercover.

== Cast ==
- Sam Elliott as Rick Carlson
- Anne Archer as Cathy
- Stephen Young as Larry
- Parker Stevenson as Chris Randolph
- Kathleen Quinlan as Wendy
- Steve Burns as Harold a.k.a. "Machine Gun"
- Sharon Weber as Tina
- Lenka Peterson as Mrs. Carlson
- George D. Wallace as Mr. Carlson
- Paul Kent as Jack Gilmore

== Production ==
Elliott's parents were lifeguards and he had worked as a lifeguard himself. He was cast after Dan Petrie and his wife saw Elliott on TV in the film Frogs. Lifeguard completed filming in August 1975 but was held for release by Paramount until the following year. Elliott held off on doing any TV in that time because he hoped the film would establish him in features.

Despite some of its serious subject matter, the film was marketed as a lighthearted beach party film. However, it was considered a breakthrough for Elliott, with the actor saying, "Dan Petrie did a great job directing that movie; it was shot for something like only $900,000. Those were the days".

Part of the film was shot in Petrie's own home.

It was executive produced by Ted Mann.

Most of the lifeguard tower scenes were filmed at the Knob Hill and "Burnout" towers in the South Bay of Los Angeles.

== Reception ==
On Rotten Tomatoes, Lifeguard holds a rating of 53% from 19 reviews.

Reviewing the film in The New York Times, Vincent Canby stated: "As a film, 'Lifeguard' is romantic twaddle, but as sociology it's a spontaneous assault on a very American way of life. [...] as entertainment it ranks somewhat above 'Bikini Beach' but below 'Godzilla Versus Megalon.'" In a positive review, Kevin Thomas of the Los Angeles Times wrote, "It's not just about a man beginning to wonder whether it's time for him to start growing up but rather about a man who's tough-minded and honest enough with himself to question what maturity really is. Is it really doing what is expected of you or is it having the courage to be yourself, to do what you want—especially when you're fortunate enough to know what you want to do in the first place?"

Time Out wrote the film "manages to perform an interesting autopsy on the psyche of the American male". Filmmaker David Frankel selected the film for a New York Times piece on favorite summer movies.

In a 2013 review for DVD Talk, Glenn Erickson said the film "captures a particular So-Cal beach vibe during a brief post-pill, pre-AIDS patch of time when a significant segment of the singles scene actually treated sex as a kind of heightened recreational activity", and noted that some elements, including the relationship with Wendy and the lightness with which the screenplay treats indecent exposure, are plainly dated. Though he said the film's drawback is "it leaves a thread or two unresolved", he reviewed the film positively and said "What makes Lifeguard special is that Elliot convinces us that he's the nicest guy ever to walk a beach."

== See also ==
- Baywatch, TV film and TV series starring David Hasselhoff, which also originally featured Parker Stevenson in the cast.
