= Judd, for the Defense =

American legal drama TV series (1967–1969)

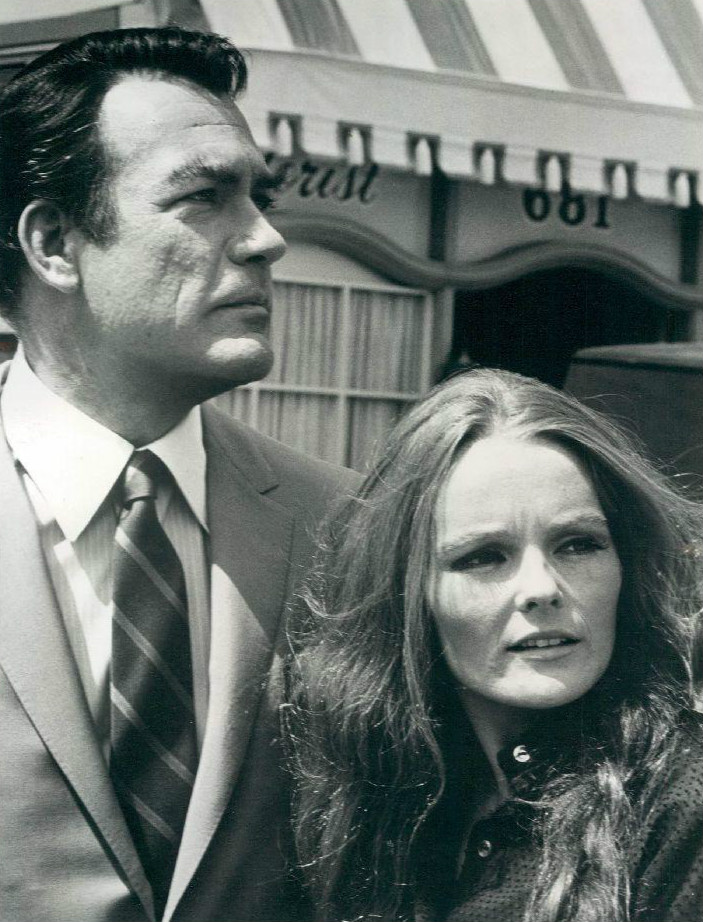
- Carl Betz as Judd with guest star Katharine Houghton, 1968.
- Genre: Legal drama
- Starring: Carl Betz; Stephen Young
- Composer: Alexander Courage
- Country of origin: United States
- Original language: English
- No. of seasons: 2
- No. of episodes: 50

Production
- Executive producer: Paul Monash
- Running time: 45–48 minutes
- Production company: 20th Century-Fox Television

Original release
- Network: ABC
- Release: September 8, 1967 – March 21, 1969

Judd, for the Defense is an American legal drama originally broadcast on the ABC network on Friday nights from September 8, 1967, to March 21, 1969. Judd was a shortened surname from Juddinski.

== Synopsis ==
The show stars Carl Betz, who had previously spent eight years in the role of Dr. Alex Stone, husband of Donna Reed in ABC's The Donna Reed Show. In his new role, reportedly based on high-profile lawyers such as F. Lee Bailey and Percy Foreman, Betz played Clinton Judd, a flamboyant attorney based in Houston, who often took on controversial cases across the country. Playing his top assistant Ben Caldwell was Stephen Young.

Foreman threatened a lawsuit before the show premiered by saying that the program was "appropriating for commercial purposes my career as a lawyer." Throughout the course of the show's two-year run, there were never enough viewers to establish Foreman's claim, although critics gave it positive reviews. Undoubtedly, the skittishness of viewers was a result of the program's dealing with then-taboo (though contemporary) subjects such as homosexuality, blacklisting, and draft evasion, with open-ended conclusions in many episodes.

The show's producer, Harold Gast, sought to break new ground with the program, using several new writers for scripts that veered away from previous television conventions. In addition, one personal experience involving credit card problems caused by computers became the basis for an episode titled "Epitaph on a Computer Card". In 1968, Gast and writer Leon Tokatyan won an Edgar Award from the Mystery Writers of America for the episode "Tempest in a Texas Town".

In an attempt to boost the low ratings of the hour-long program, the episode which aired on January 31, 1969, combined the Judd cast with that of another ABC series, Felony Squad, starring Dennis Cole. The idea did not salvage either program, as both were soon canceled.

Betz's portrayal of a lawyer was enough to provide him paid opportunities to speak before groups of attorneys, and also helped him win both Golden Globe and Emmy Awards after the show's final season. Additionally, screenwriter Robert Lewin won a Writer's Guild award for the episode "To Kill a Madman."

Other actors appearing on episodes of the show included Ed Asner, Karen Black, Scott Brady, Len Birman, Russ Conway, Tyne Daly, Richard Dreyfuss, Robert Duvall, Lee Grant, Rodolfo Hoyos, Jr., Ron Howard, Vivi Janiss, Wright King, Ida Lupino, Barry Morse, Jessica Tandy, Lurene Tuttle, and William Windom.

== Episode guide ==
=== Season 1 (1967–68) ===
No. overall	No. in season	Title	Directed by	Written by	Original release date	Prod. code
1	1	"Tempest in a Texas Town"	Harvey Hart	Story by : Paul Monash; Teleplay by : Harold Gast & Leon Tokatyan	September 8, 1967	6044
In the opening episode, Judd defends a wild, rebellious young man who has exerted a Pied Piper-like influence over a small town's teenagers. The young man is accused of killing two teenage girls although no bodies have been found and they might be runaways. Pat Hingle guest stars.
2	2	"The Deep End"	Seymour Robbie	Saul Levitt	September 15, 1967	1802
Judd defends a skipper charged with the murder of four people aboard his boat. The only witness is a little girl who was also wounded during the attack. Beverly Garland and Leslie Nielsen guest star.
3	3	"The Other Face of the Law"	Robert Butler	Ellis Kadison & Joel Kane	September 22, 1967	1804
Judd defends an ex-cop who claims that he was framed for murder after he tried to expose corruption within the department. Ed Asner and Jeff Corey guest star.
4	4	"A Civil Case of Murder"	Boris Sagal	Halstead Welles	September 29, 1967	1806
A football player asks Judd to represent him in fighting his late wife's parents for custody of his son. But soon the case takes on a more serious turn, as the grandparents accuse him of killing their daughter. John Dehner, Daniel J. Travanti and Brooke Bundy guest star
5	5	"Shadow of a Killer"	Leo Penn	Sheldon Stark	October 6, 1967	1805
Judd takes the case of a pregnant young woman who was found outside the scene of a burglary and charged with it. Quentin Dean, Joe Don Baker and Vincent Gardenia guest star.
6	6	"Conspiracy"	John Erman	Leo Lieberman & Meyer Dolinsky	October 13, 1967	1809
Judd represents architect Paul Christopher (Kevin McCarthy) in his lawsuit against a former police chief turned special investigator, who is ruthlessly harassing Christopher in his attempt to prove him guilty of conspiracy in the assassination of a mayor. John Considine and Kim Darby guest star.
7	7	"Confessional"	Alex March	William Froug	October 20, 1967	1803
The son of an oil tycoon makes false confession. Chill Wills guest stars.
8	8	"Death from a Flower Girl"	William Hale	Story by : David Davidson; Teleplay by : Irving Gaynor Neiman & Stanford Whitmore	October 27, 1967	1808
Judd's client is a young girl who shot her married lover but claims she mistook him for a burglar. He finds he must defend her "New Morality" lifestyle as well as the murder charge. Katherine Justice and Andrew Duggan guest star.
9	9	"Commitment"	Robert Butler	Paul Monash	November 3, 1967	1813
An escaped convict confronts Judd in a parking lot and demands that he take his case to prove him innocent of the murder he was convicted of six years earlier. Judd motions for a new trial, because the man's previous attorney did not provide an adequate defense. Brock Peters, Cicely Tyson and William Windom guest star.
10	10	"Citizen Ritter"	Alex March	Story by : Jack Jacobs & Lawrence Louis Goldman; Teleplay by : Sheldon Stark	November 10, 1967	1811
Judd's partner Ben (Stephen Young) has a client charged with killing the doctor who illegally operated on his daughter and almost killed her. Judd believes the man has a violent streak. Ben uncovers many dark secrets when the case goes to trial. Murray Hamilton and Norma Crane guest star.
11	11	"The Money Farm"	Ralph Senensky	Anthony Terpiloff	November 17, 1967	1807
An oil company executive is charged with the murder of a man who had been blackmailing him. The defendant says the victim stumbled during a fight and fell off a platform accidentally, but two witnesses insist that he was pushed. James Whitmore and Diana Muldaur guest star.
12	12	"To Kill a Madman"	Larry Peerce	Robert Lewin	November 24, 1967	1812
An old classmate of Judd's law partner Ben (Stephen Young) is accused of murdering three young women. Len Birman and William Schallert guest star.
13	13	"To Love and Stand Mute"	Michael Caffey	Gerry Day	December 1, 1967	1810
Judd and his law partner, Ben (Stephen Young) take the case of a deaf-mute couple who want to adopt the foster child they've been taking care of. A complication develops when the child's natural mother shows up and decides to rescind her original decision to give up her baby. Ruta Lee guest stars.
14	14	"The Living Victim"	William Hale	Harold Gast	December 8, 1967	1815
Judd is representing mobster Walter Whittaker (Robert Alda), who is targeted by prosecutor Joseph Flexner (John Larch). A bomb killed Flexner's wife and despite a lack of evidence, he indicts Whittaker for the murder. Joan Hackett also stars.
15	15	"Firebrand"	Alex March	Frank Paris	December 15, 1967	1814
Judd visits his client, labor leader Gabriel Aguila (Rodolfo Hoyos Jr.), in jail for staging an illegal strike. But in a failed escape attempt a police officer is killed and Judd is taken hostage as leverage. Perry Lopez and Mark Lenard guest star.
16	16	"Everybody Loved Harlan But His Wife"	Gerald Mayer	James M. Miller	January 5, 1968	1818
Judd defends a woman who admits to killing her invalid husband. She claims she was in fear for her life because of his increasingly violent and erratic behavior, but no one else in her town claims to have seen that side of him. Vera Miles and Charles Drake guest star.
17	17	"Fall of a Skylark: Part 1 — The Trial"	Boris Sagal	Andy Lewis	January 12, 1968	1817-1
Judd defends the playboy son of a millionaire hotel owner who has been charged with the murder of the hotel's bookmaker, to whom he was in debt. Bradford Dillman and Diana Hyland guest star.
18	18	"Fall of a Skylark: Part 2 — The Appeal"	Boris Sagal	Andy Lewis	January 19, 1968	1817-2
After his client Bruzzy Burke (Bradford Dillman) is convicted, Judd continues to work to try to appeal the conviction, even though he is fired by Bruzzy's millionaire father (Barry Morse). His first step is to discredit the witness whose surprise testimony led to the conviction, and to use new witnesses; however, one of them winds up dead. Diana Hyland and Malachi Throne also star.
19	19	"No Law Against Murder"	Boris Sagal	Harold Gast	January 26, 1968	1819
As a member of a national committee of attorneys assigned to civil rights cases, Judd must defend a client he'd prefer not to: a Southern sheriff charged with violating the civil rights of a harassed Northern writer who was found dead shortly after the sheriff was seen taking him away in his car. Earl Holliman and Mariette Hartley guest star.
20	20	"The Grand Old Man"	Boris Sagal	Dave Lewis & Andy Lewis	February 2, 1968	1820
Judd's law partner Ben (Stephen Young) defends the son of a grocer who was murdered by the mob. The young man is accused of kidnapping the retired gangster father of the man who is believed to have ordered the killing. Christopher Connelly and Albert Dekker guest star.
21	21	"What You Can Do with Money"	Boris Sagal	Harold Gast & William Froug	February 9, 1968	1821
Judd is called to the home of an assistant to a high-powered millionaire industrialist, where he is shown the body of a dead man in a boat. Judd finds much obfuscation regarding the facts of the case, as the industrialist tries to control the official story. Eventually, the assistant confesses to killing the man, claiming the victim attacked his wife, but Judd is skeptical. Albert Salmi and Janice Rule guest star.
22	22	"Kingdom of the Blind"	Christian Nyby	John W. Bloch	February 16, 1968	1822
A one-time film star, hoping for a comeback, asks Judd to represent a scriptwriter to help him get out of a restrictive contract with a Hollywood producer. The producer is subsequently murdered and the writer is charged with the crime. Tim O'Connor and Ida Lupino guest star.
23	23	"The Devil's Surrogate"	Larry Peerce	William Kelley	February 23, 1968	1823
A headstrong, controversial priest answers a desperate call from one of his students, a young woman who has been smitten with him. She tells him she is going to kill herself unless he comes to her apartment. The priest arrives, only to find himself in a situation in which the girl's boyfriend is accidentally shot and killed. Judd defends the priest. James Franciscus and Karen Black guest star.
24	24	"Square House"	Alex March	Arthur Rowe	March 1, 1968	1824
A parolee may be sent back to prison for associating with a rehabilitation center for former convicts, as this violates the terms of his parole. Judd defends him, but he soon has worse problems, as he is charged with killing an old associate during a robbery attempt. Robert Duvall and Collin Wilcox guest star.
25	25	"The Worst of Both Worlds"	George McCowan	Norman Borisoff	March 8, 1968	1825
In Juvenile Court, without the benefit of counsel, 17-year-old Kenny Carter, Jr. is consigned to the county Juvenile Home for three years based on the charge of stealing and wrecking a car, for which he vaguely denies guilt. Judd steps in to uphold Carter's full rights under due process, but Carter is reluctant to cooperate, as he is concealing a terrible secret. Luke Halpin and Pippa Scott guest star.
26	26	"You Remember Joe Maddox"	George McCowan	Franklin Barton	March 15, 1968	1826
Joe Maddox (Kevin McCarthy) is desperate to find a decent job after being eased out of the editor's position he held for years. But he makes the mistake of confronting the former employer whom he blames for the loss of his job, resulting in the man's death and Maddox being charged with his murder. Coleen Gray also stars.

=== Season 2 (1968–69) ===
No. overall	No. in season	Title	Directed by	Written by	Original release date	Prod. code
27	1	"In a Puff of Smoke"	Richard A. Colla	Harold Gast	September 27, 1968	2801
Ray Elliott (Robert Forster), an attorney who is well known for his advocacy against the draft, is charged with murder after a young man he was counseling immolates himself in public to avoid conscription. Prosecutors contend Elliott encouraged the young man to do it. Barry Atwater and Katharine Houghton guest star.
28	2	"Transplant"	Walter Grauman	William Kelley	October 4, 1968	2803
Judd defends a doctor accused of murder after performing a heart transplant. The recipient is a young woman who the doctor has fallen in love with, and another doctor present claims that the donor was still alive when his heart was removed. John Vernon and Julie Sommars guest star.
29	3	"The Ends of Justice"	John Moxey	Charles McDaniel	October 11, 1968	2807
Jody Crews (Bernie Hamilton) is arrested on a minor charge when he tries to stop his black militant son's group from using a gun. Judd easily gets that charge dropped, but the arrest brings to light the fact that Crews escaped from prison years earlier in South Carolina, where he had been convicted of murder after a traffic accident. Though Judd is sure he can get the conviction overturned, Crews' son (Georg Stanford Brown) hopes to use his father's plight to bolster his group's claim that a black man can't receive justice through laws made by whites. Larry Linville also stars.
30	4	"The Name of This Game is Acquittal"	Alexander Singer	E. Arthur Kean	October 18, 1968	2808
One of Judd's female lawyer colleagues, accused of intentionally running down a woman in an alley, uses different ways to pressure Judd into taking her shaky case. Pat Crowley and Virginia Capers guest star.
31	5	"The Sound of the Plastic Axe"	Richard A. Colla	James M. Miller	October 25, 1968	2804
Judd defends a rock entrepreneur who is charged with the murder of his wife, who died at a party he was hosting. Though she died of a heart condition, the man is accused of giving her the amphetamines which contributed to her death. Peter Haskell and Norman Fell guest star.
32	6	"The Death Farm"	John Moxey	Robert Lewin	November 1, 1968	2805
A young woman begs Judd to defend her friend, an escapee from a prison farm, who claims he will be killed if he is sent back there. The man claims to have killed a convict/trustee who tried to stop his escape. But when Judd asks about this at the farm, the officials deny the man was ever killed. Bonnie Bedelia and Wright King guest star.
33	7	"Weep the Hunter Home"	Lamont Johnson	Mel Goldberg & Arthur H. Singer	November 8, 1968	2810
An old friend of Judd objects to his son's friendship with a young man whom he thinks is a homosexual. Later, when the father is shot in an altercation, the son's friend is accused of attempted murder. Richard Dreyfuss and Dana Elcar guest star.
34	8	"The Gates of Cerberus"	Leo Penn	John W. Bloch	November 15, 1968	2802
Judd defends a man who filmed a movie inside a mental institution, a project he began as a patient. The institution does not want the film shown to the public, but the filmmaker and his backers--led by his wife and brother-in-law--strongly believe conditions inside such places must be exposed. Sam Wanamaker, Phil Bruns, Stuart Margolin and Lee Grant guest star.
35	9	"My Client, the Fool"	Walter Doniger	Alvin Sapinsley	November 22, 1968	2809
Judd's partner Ben (Stephen Young) successfully defends a young man in a paternity suit by bringing out the names of other men who the baby's mother may have been with. But soon afterward he is arrested and charged with bringing the young woman across state lines for immoral purposes. Arthur Hill, Donna Baccala and Patricia Quinn guest star.
36	10	"Punishment, Cruel and Unusual"	Lamont Johnson	Charles A. McDaniel	December 6, 1968	2812
Judd defends an alcoholic woman who has been charged with hit-and-run even though she has not had a drink in years. It is soon obvious the evidence against her is flimsy, but the judge in the case denies every motion Judd tries to prove this. Judd soon decides to show that the judge is biased due to his unsuccessful battle against alcohol. Jessica Tandy and James Daly guest star.
37	11	"Thou Shalt Not Suffer a Witch to Live"	Leo Penn	Robert Lewin	December 13, 1968	2815
A man removes his pregnant wife from a group of witches, who have convinced her that they could protect the baby. After she goes back again, he returns and this time accidentally injures the group's high priest, who tried to stop him from taking his wife back. Judd defends the man against a charge of assault, feeling that he genuinely feared for his wife and baby. Betty Field and Kenneth Tobey guest star.
38	12	"A Swim with Sharks"	Jud Taylor	Barry Oringer	December 20, 1968	2806
A longshoreman dealing with loan sharks who have taken over his union is charged with the murder of the union steward, who he believed was assisting them in charging him exorbitant interest on a loan. Simon Oakland and Gerald S. O'Loughlin guest star.
39	13	"The Crystal Maze"	John Erman	John W. Bloch	January 3, 1969	2813
A young woman whom Judd hasn't seen since she was a child names him as custodian for her baby after she kills her husband and then herself. Judd can't permanently take care of the child, but he finds that no one in the young woman's family is well suited for the baby either, and thus must consider adoption if the family will agree to it. Carrie Snodgress and Margaret Leighton guest star.
40	14	"Borderline Girl"	Boris Sagal	Harold Gast	January 10, 1969	2814
Judd assists another attorney in defending a mildly retarded young woman who readily admits to killing the young man she considered her boyfriend, saying that she did it because he told her to. Brooke Bundy, Sandy Kenyon and Geraldine Brooks guest star.
41	15	"Epitaph on a Computer Card"	Leo Penn	E. Arthur Kean	January 17, 1969	2816
A man finds his job and reputation being destroyed by a minor mistake on a computer card, and, in his attempts to do something about it, he may be digging himself in even deeper. William Daniels and Jacqueline Scott guest star.
42	16	"The Poisoned Tree"	Leo Penn	Story by : Tina Pine & Lester Pine; Teleplay by : Roger H. Lewis	January 24, 1969	2811
The kleptomaniac daughter of a wealthy woman is charged with grand theft. She insists she is innocent, but proving it would involve telling a secret that could jeopardize her family situation. Dennis Patrick and Nancy Wickwire guest star.
43	17	"The Law and Order Blues: Part 2"	William Wiard	Harold Gast	January 31, 1969	2818
This episode was a crossover with Felony Squad. Guest stars: Ed Asner, Howard Duff, Brock Peters and Dennis Cole.
44	18	"Between the Dark and the Daylight"	John Erman	John W. Bloch	February 7, 1969	2819
A student who has been acting as an undercover agent for the police narcotics squad is accused by several students of raping a girl. Judd defends him but believes more is motivating him than just a desire to keep his fellow students off of drugs. Ron Howard and Lane Bradbury guest star.
45	19	"The Holy Ground: Part 1 — The Killing"	Leo Penn	William Kelley	February 14, 1969	2820
Dan Miles (Walter Brooke) arrives at a spiritual retreat run by Reverend Barnaby Cutler (Richard Kiley) to take his wife home, but she refuses to go. Soon Miles is found dead, and Cutler is charged with his murder. His claim that he does not even remember the day's events makes it look even worse for him. John Dehner and Joanne Linville guest star.
46	20	"The Holy Ground: Part 2 — The Killers"	Leo Penn	William Kelley	February 21, 1969	2821
After a recording of a conversation at one of his sessions is played, the prosecution charges that Reverend Barnaby Cutler (Richard Kiley) planned the murder of victim Dan Miles (Walter Brooke) with the help of his lover, Miles' wife, Paula (Joanne Linville). John Dehner and Edward Binns also guest star.
47	21	"An Elephant in a Cigar Box"	Charles S. Dubin	Robert Lewin	February 28, 1969	2822
Judd defends a smug anti-government man suspected of smuggling. Paul Henreid and Charles Grodin guest star.
48	22	"The View from the Ivory Tower"	Leo Penn	Alvin Sapinsley	March 7, 1969	2823
Judd defends a college professor whose job is on the line after he invited a black militant lecturer to one of his events. Dennis Weaver and Al Freeman Jr. guest star.
49	23	"Runaway"	Leo Penn	E. Arthur Kean	March 14, 1969	2824
A friend of Judd's is shot and killed while with his rebellious daughter and her horse. The girl claims it was an accident, but though he agrees to defend her Judd has trouble believing her version of the event, as does her mother. Susan Anspach and Jacqueline Scott guest star.
50	24	"Visitation"	Michael O'Herlihy	Jack Morse	March 21, 1969	2817
A divorced man, fearful that his ex-wife plans to leave the country with his son, also learns that he has no legal right to stop her according to the divorce agreement. While trying to find them, he gets into an argument with his brother-in-law and accidentally kills him. Gavin MacLeod and John McMartin guest star.
