= Conagher =

1991 TV film

- Genre: Western
- Based on: Conagher by Louis L'Amour
- Written by: Jeffrey M. Meyer; Sam Elliott; Katharine Ross
- Directed by: Reynaldo Villalobos
- Starring: Sam Elliott; Katharine Ross; Barry Corbin; Ken Curtis; Buck Taylor; Dub Taylor; James Gammon; Gavan O'Herlihy; Billy "Green" Bush
- Music by: J. A. C. Redford
- Country of origin: United States
- Original language: English

Production
- Producers: John A Kuri; Sam Elliott
- Cinematography: James R. Bagdonas
- Editor: Zach Staenberg
- Running time: 117 minutes
- Production companies: Imagine Entertainment; TNT; Turner Pictures

Original release
- Network: TNT
- Release: July 1, 1991

Conagher is a 1991 American Western made-for-television film co-produced and distributed by TNT, based on the 1969 Louis L'Amour novel of the same name.

== Plot ==
The film opens with the Teale family moving west on a wagon into Indian Territory. They reach their home and plan to go into the cattle business. The father, Jacob, rides out to procure the cattle, promising to return in a month. He is killed along the way, though, when his horse falls over on him and he bleeds to death internally.

Meanwhile, a stagecoach passes by the Teale farm; Evie Teale agrees to work for the stagecoach by feeding customers. One of the men on the stagecoach warns Evie of a man named Conn Conagher, whom he claims is a fierce gunfighter. One day, Conagher and his partner Mahler stop at the Teale farm for food. The farm later comes under attack by Indians. The stagecoach arrives again in the middle of the gunfight, and the drivers and the passengers help defend the farm. The defeated Indians retreat in the morning.

Conagher, meanwhile, drifts out in the wilderness. Mahler and he meet an old rancher, Seaborn Tay, who hires both of them. Conagher proves to be a hardworking cowhand, but the ranch comes under threat by the Ladder Five gang, led by Smoke Parnell. Mahler deserts the ranch after an argument with Conagher and joins the Ladder gang. Conagher saves the ranch and Tay's cattle twice from the Ladder gang, both in a series of quick gun battles. He also visits the Teale farm regularly, and Evie and he grow fond of each other and he becomes a father figure to her children.

One day, when Conagher is out herding Tay's cattle, he is ambushed and shot by the Ladder Five gang. The wounded Conagher hides out during the day, and at night returns and holds the Ladder Five, including Parnell, at gunpoint. Weak from his wound, Conagher eventually collapses and passes out, but not before he demands the Ladder Five to clear off of the land. Parnell knows now that he can finish Conagher, as his gang has sworn to do, but instead orders his man to take Conagher to Seaborn Tay. The next day, the Ladder Five gang clears off the land.

Evie Teale writes anonymous poems and ties them to tumbleweeds. Conagher chases tumbleweeds all over the prairie through most of the film, but he does not guess she is the tumbleweed poet until the end.

When Conagher recovers, he tells Tay he feels like drifting again. Tay says he can stay and own part of the ranch, he has earned it, but Conagher has always been a drifter and he feels he needs to move on. He stops in the saloon in town and sees the stagecoach manager, who buys him a drink. Conagher tells him he has "tumbleweed fever" and the stagecoach manager laughs and says, "you, too?" Apparently, cowboys all over the county have been finding the notes tied to the tumbleweeds, and wondering about the woman who wrote them. The conversation shifts to Mrs. Teale, and the stagecoach manager says the family had a hard winter, but they made it through. He tells Conagher he should go visit, but Conagher says he feels like heading north.

In the next scene, Conagher returns to the family's cabin. He has brought some groceries as a gift and Mrs. Teale asks him to stay for dinner. He ends up staying for a few days and helps fix the roof and do other chores. Mrs. Teale and he are sitting in rockers in front of the house and he seems like he may be about to say something romantic when Mahler rides up. Apparently, he has been courting Mrs. Teale, although she is not very interested. Conagher and he have a quiet argument about the Ladder Five gang in front of Mrs. Teale, and when Mahler sees that she believes Conagher, he turns and rides away.

Evie asks Conagher what he was about to say before Mahler appeared, but he claims he cannot remember. He tells her it is time for him to be moving on, and he gives her some money to buy more groceries, saying he would like to return, but he does not want to be an imposition. He rides off, telling himself he is a fool, but he does not think he is worthy of Evie.

In town, Conagher plans to get drunk and then head north, but he finds a drunken Mahler in the saloon. The two argue again, and Conagher challenges Mahler to a fist fight. Mahler starts out beating up Conagher; Conagher finally gains the upper hand. Evie arrives at that moment, when she tells Conagher, "It's time for you to come home now." Conagher is physically hurt, but asks her why she came here. She tells them they all felt lost without him. He takes some of her tumbleweed notes out of his pocket and asks her if she wrote them. She said she did. She was just so lonely, she had to talk to someone even if no one were there to hear. He says, "There was, Evie, there was me." They kiss, and he says they can start a new life together. She smiles and they walk out the door together.

== Cast ==
- Sam Elliott as Conn Conagher
- Katharine Ross as Evie Teale
- Barry Corbin as Charlie McCloud, Stage Driver
- Gavan O'Herlihy as Cris Mahler, Cowboy
- Billy "Green" Bush as Jacob Teale
- Ken Curtis as Seaborn Tay, Cattle Rancher
- Paul Koslo as Kiowa Staples
- Daniel Quinn as Johnny McGivern
- Pepe Serna as Casuse, Ladder Five Rider
- Buck Taylor as Tile Coker, Ladder Five Rider
- Dub Taylor as Station Agent
- Cody Braun as Laban Teale
- Anndi McAfee as Ruthie Teale
- James Gammon as "Smoke" Parnell, Ladder Five Owner
- Angelique L'Amour as Stage Passenger

== Production ==
Sam Elliott and Katharine Ross had been friends of author Louis L’Amour's and bought the screen rights to his novel Conagher and wrote the screenplay. After L'Amour passed away, TNT became interested in making the movie with Ron Howard to co-produce and Bob Totten to rewrite the script. Elliott and Ross were dissatisfied with the rewrite and threatened to take the project to HBO, instead.
