= Eddie Murphy filmography =

Performances by American comedian

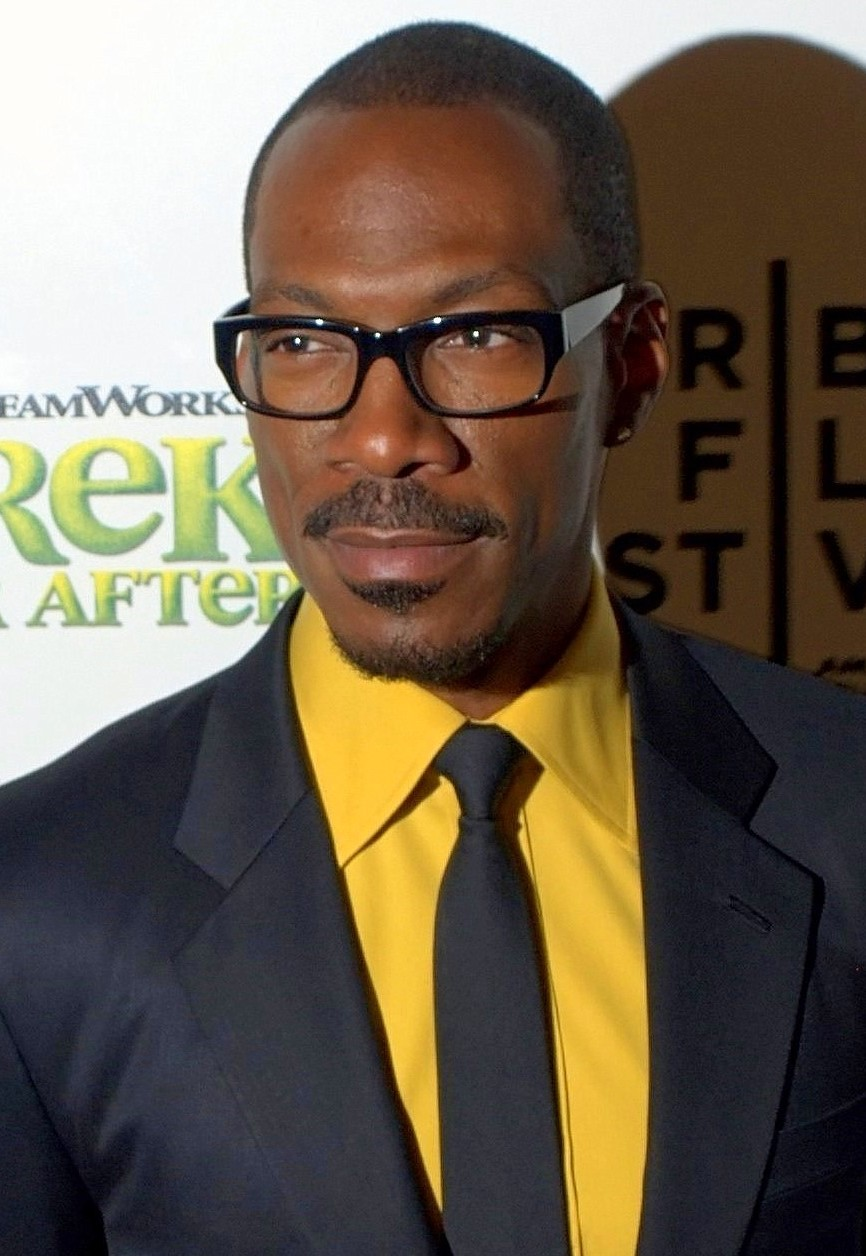
- Eddie Murphy at 2010 Tribeca Film Festival
- Film: 48
- Television series: 15

The following is the filmography of American actor and comedian Eddie Murphy that includes his work in film and television.

== Film ==
Key
†	Denotes films that have not yet been released

Eddie Murphy film credits
Year	Title	Role	Notes
1982	48 Hrs.	Reggie Hammond	Film debut
1983	Trading Places	Billy Ray Valentine	
1984	Best Defense	Lieutenant T. M. Landry	
1984	Beverly Hills Cop	Detective Axel Foley	
1986	The Golden Child	Chandler Jarrell	
1987	Beverly Hills Cop II	Detective Axel Foley	Also story writer
1987	Eddie Murphy Raw	Himself	Stand-up film, Also writer and executive producer
1988	Coming to America	Prince Akeem Joffer / Clarence / Randy Watson / Saul	Also story writer
1989	Harlem Nights	Vernest "Quick" Brown	Also writer, executive producer and director
1990	Another 48 Hrs.	Reggie Hammond	Also story writer, Credited as Fred Braughton
1992	Boomerang	Marcus Graham	Also story writer
1992	The Distinguished Gentleman	Thomas Jefferson Johnson	
1994	Beverly Hills Cop III	Detective Axel Foley	
1995	Vampire in Brooklyn	Maximillian / Preacher Pauly / Guido	Also story writer and producer
1996	The Nutty Professor	Various roles	
1997	Metro	Insp. Scott Roper	
1998	Mulan	Mushu	Voice
1998	Dr. Dolittle	Dr. John Dolittle	
1998	Holy Man	G	
1999	Life	Rayford "Ray" Gibson	Also producer
1999	Bowfinger	Kit Ramsey / Jiffrenson "Jiff" Ramsey	
2000	Nutty Professor II: The Klumps	Various roles	Also executive producer
2001	Shrek	Donkey	Voice
2001	Dr. Dolittle 2	Dr. John Dolittle	
2002	Showtime	Officer Trey Sellers	
2002	The Adventures of Pluto Nash	Pluto Nash / Rex Crater	
2002	I Spy	Kelly Robinson	
2003	Daddy Day Care	Charles "Charlie" Hinton	
2003	The Haunted Mansion	Jim Evers	
2004	Shrek 2	Donkey	Voice
2006	Dreamgirls	James "Thunder" Early	
2007	Norbit	Norbit Albert Rice / Rasputia Latimore / Mr. Wong	Also writer and producer
2007	Shrek the Third	Donkey	Voice
2008	Meet Dave	Dave Ming Chang / The Captain	
2009	Imagine That	Evan Danielson	
2009	Why We Laugh: Black Comedians on Black Comedy	Himself	Documentary
2010	Shrek Forever After	Donkey	Voice
2011	Tower Heist	Darnell "Slide" Davis	Also producer
2011	Method to the Madness of Jerry Lewis	Himself	Documentary
2012	A Thousand Words	Jack McCall	
2013	Whoopi Golberg Presents Moms Mabley	Himself	Documentary
2016	Mr. Church	Henry Joseph Church	
2019	Dolemite Is My Name	Rudy Ray Moore	Also producer
2021	Coming 2 America	Prince Akeem Joffer / Clarence / Randy Watson / Saul	Also producer
2023	You People	Akbar Mohammed	
2023	Candy Cane Lane	Christopher Jack "Chris" Carver	Also producer
2024	Beverly Hills Cop: Axel F	Inspector Axel Foley	Also producer
2025	The Pickup	Russell Pierce	Also producer
2025	Being Eddie	Himself	Documentary
2027	Shrek 5 †	Donkey	Voice, In production

== Television ==
Eddie Murphy television credits
Year	Title	Role	Notes	Ref.
1980–1984	Saturday Night Live	Himself/Cast member	65 episodes, also writer	
1982, 1984, 2019	Saturday Night Live	Himself (host)	3 episodes	
1983	Eddie Murphy: Delirious	Himself	Stand-up special, also writer and producer	
1983	The 14th Annual NAACP Image Awards	Himself (host)	TV special	
1983	The 35th Annual Primetime Emmy Awards	Himself (host & nominee)	TV special	
1985	1985 MTV Video Music Awards	Himself (host)	TV special	
1989	What's Alan Watching?	Protester / James Brown	TV special, also executive producer	
1991	The Royal Family	—N/a	Creator and executive producer only	
1999–2001	The PJs	Thurgood Stubbs (voice)	31 episodes, also creator and executive producer	
2004	Father of the Pride	Donkey (voice)	Episode: "Donkey"	
2007	Shrek the Halls	Donkey (voice)	TV special	
2010	Donkey's Christmas Shrektacular	Donkey (voice)	TV special	
2012	Eddie Murphy: One Night Only	Himself	TV special	
2013	Beverly Hills Cop	Axel Foley	Unaired TV pilot	
2019	Comedians in Cars Getting Coffee	Himself	Episode: "Eddie Murphy"	

== Theme parks ==
Eddie Murphy in theme parks
Year	Title	Voice role	Notes	Ref.
2003	Shrek 4-D	Donkey	Universal Studios attraction, multiple locations	

== Music videos ==
Eddie Murphy music video credits
Year	Title	Artist	Album	Role	Ref.
1985	"Party All the Time"	Eddie Murphy	How Could It Be	Himself	
1985	"How Could It Be"	Eddie Murphy	How Could It Be	Himself	
1989	"Put Your Mouth on Me"	Eddie Murphy	So Happy	Himself	
1992	"Remember the Time"	Michael Jackson	Dangerous	Pharaoh Ramesses III	
1993	"Whatzupwitu"	Eddie Murphy	Love's Alright	Himself	
1993	"Desdamona"	Eddie Murphy	Love's Alright	Himself	
1993	"I Was a King"	Eddie Murphy (feat. Shabba Ranks)	Love's Alright	Himself	
2013	"Red Light"	Eddie Murphy (feat. Snoop Lion)	9 (unreleased)	Himself	
2013	"Promise (You Won't Break My Heart)"	Eddie Murphy	9 (unreleased)	Himself	
2013	"Temporary"	Eddie Murphy	9 (unreleased)	Himself	
2015	"Oh Jah Jah"	Eddie Murphy	Non-album single	Himself	
