= Mushu =

Fictional character from Disney's Mulan

- Mulan character
- First appearance: Mulan (1998)
- Created by: Robert D. San Souci
- Designed by: Tom Bancroft (supervising animator)
- Voiced by: Eddie Murphy: Mark Moseley (sequel and merchandise); Isaac Robinson-Smith (2023-)

In-universe information
- Species: Chinese dragon

Mushu is a fictional character in Disney's Mulan franchise, first appearing in the 1998 animated film Mulan. A small Chinese dragon, Mushu was a spiritual guardian of Mulan's family until he was demoted for failing to protect an ancestor. Initially, he plots to redeem himself by ensuring Mulan's safety and success when she enlists herself in the army in her father's place, becoming her best friend in the process. In the sequel, Mulan II, he attempts to sabotage Mulan's impending marriage in order to remain her guardian.

Although Mulan is based on the Chinese legend about Hua Mulan, Mushu is an original character created for the film, at the suggestion of Roy E. Disney. The creators decided to make the dragon small as to not overwhelm Mulan on screen. Inspired by Robin Williams' performance as the Genie in Aladdin (1992), Mulan's producers aspired to cast another comedian as Mushu, and had originally hired Joe Pesci. After deciding to go in an African-American direction for Mulan's sidekick, they cast Eddie Murphy, who recorded his dialogue from his home studio due to scheduling conflicts. Supervising animator Tom Bancroft studied both Chinese culture and dragon characters from previous animated Disney films to design the character, while drawing inspiration from Murphy's previous work and mannerisms.

Mushu's characterization was generally well-received by American critics and audiences. Most reviewers praised Murphy's performance, but some felt the character diminished the film's serious subject matter. Meanwhile, reception towards Mushu in China was negative, with viewers accusing him of mocking Chinese culture and dragons. Several publications have ranked him as one of Disney's greatest sidekicks. Disney's decision to not include the character in the 2020 live-action adaptation of Mulan in an effort to be more culturally sensitive to Chinese audiences drew a mixed response from fans of Mushu.

== Role ==
When the Great Wall of China is breached by the Huns led by Shan Yu, the Emperor of China demands that one man from every household enlists in the Imperial army. Mulan, the only child of aging war veteran Fa Zhou, disguises herself as a man and enlists herself in the army, risking the death penalty should her gender be discovered. Mulan's ancestors plan to send a dragon guardian to retrieve her; they summon Mushu, a small dragon who was previously demoted for failing to protect a member of the Fa Family, to awaken him. Mushu accidentally destroys the dragon guardian's statue while attempting to wake him, and seizes the opportunity to accompany Mulan instead, with his own goal of redeeming himself in the eyes of the ancestors by becoming her guardian. Although well-intentioned, his efforts sometimes create further complications for Mulan. Determined to have Mulan prove herself, Mushu forges a letter that results in her inexperienced squadron of new recruits traveling to the Tung Shao Pass, where they discover that the village and the rest of their army had already been massacred by the Huns. During a battle in which Mulan defeats most of the Huns by causing an avalanche, Mulan is injured, and her true identity is revealed to the army and Captain Li Shang. Shang spares her life in return for saving his moments earlier, but discharges Mulan. Mushu forlornly confesses his selfish intentions to Mulan, but promises that they will overcome their problems together. They discover that Shan Yu and his army's surviving members are on their way to the kingdom and decide to pursue them. Mulan successfully traps Shan Yu on the palace rooftop, and Mushu ignites a firework that kills him. The emperor praises Mulan as a hero and pardons her transgressions. Mulan decides to reject an offer to join the emperor's council and instead returns home to her father's embrace. Mushu is finally reinstated as a guardian by the ancestors, albeit reluctantly.

In Mulan II, Mushu initially attempts to prevent the engaged Mulan and Shang from marrying, since a marriage would result in Mushu losing his position as Mulan's guardian; the ancestors are pleased with this as they see it as a chance to get Mushu out of power due to him bossing them around. Mushu travels with Mulan and Shang on a mission to protect three princesses, attempting to sabotage their relationship along the way while Cri-Kee and Khan try to prevent this from happening. After being forced to reveal his motive to Mulan out of guilt, this causes him to lose Mulan's trust. Following Shang's apparent death and Mulan's decision to take part in an arranged marriage, Mushu's guilt grows stronger to the point where he is even willing to sacrifice his job for Mulan's sake. When Shang is revealed to be still alive, Mushu redeems himself to stop Mulan's arranged marriage by impersonating the Golden Dragon of Unity. This selfless act causes the others to forgive him for his earlier misdeeds. However, Shang ends up combining the family temples, allowing Mushu to keep his job (upsetting the ancestors as their chance to remove Mushu from power has been ruined) and reveals himself to Shang.

== Development ==
=== Creation and casting ===
Mushu does not exist in the Chinese legend about Hua Mulan or the Ballad of Hua Mulan, on which the film is based. He was created specifically for the animated film, although most of its writers considered him to be obligatory and protested his inclusion. Despite considering dragons to be among the most recognizable aspects of Chinese culture and imagery, Disney was initially concerned that a dragon sidekick would dwarf Mulan on screen. Disney chairman Roy E. Disney suggested the character of Mushu upon learning that dragons in Chinese folklore can be different sizes. The character was created to provide comic relief, and named after a Chinese-American dish; he ultimately replaced a panda sidekick named "Moo Goo Gai Panda". At one point, Mushu was intended to be two characters, a gryphon and a phoenix, and featured in the film much more prominently. Inspired by the success of Robin Williams' performance as the Genie in Aladdin (1992), the producers hoped to cast a comic actor in the role, and had considered Joe Pesci, Steve Martin, and Sinbad. They also animated a demo reel to some of Pesci's dialogue from one of his films. Pesci was originally cast, with an early version of Mushu being described as a serpent with two different heads and personalities voiced by Pesci and Richard Dreyfuss, respectively. The filmmakers had originally envisioned the character having a "New York, tough guy, streetwise" accent reminiscent of actors Billy Crystal and Danny DeVito, but deemed these traits too derivative of supporting characters from previous Disney films.

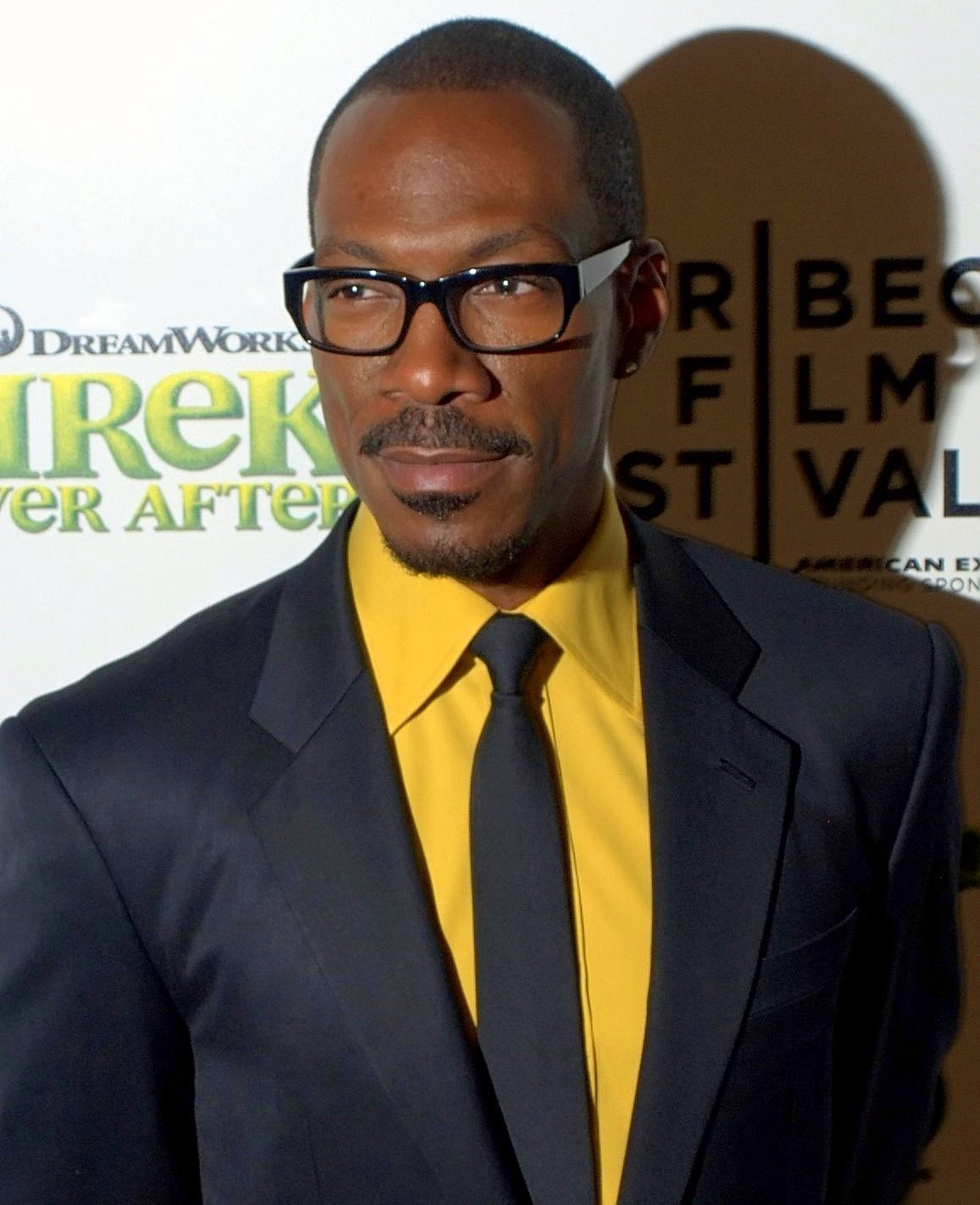
Eddie Murphy voices Mushu.

According to director Tony Bancroft, Mushu had always been described as the opposite of Mulan personality-wise, and felt an African-American character would deliver the perfect contrast to the heroine's stoic demeanor. They started interviewing several African-American performers. Disney executive Michael Eisner ultimately suggested actor-comedian Eddie Murphy, whose casting was confirmed in June 1997. Murphy had previously expressed interest in doing animation at the time, whereas Eisner said Murphy owed him a favor for producing one of the actor's first major films, Beverly Hills Cop (1984). Tom Bancroft, Mushu's supervising animator and Tony's twin brother, was initially unsure about contrasting the film's serious depiction of Chinese culture against an urban voice, but ultimately felt the character would infuse Mulan with dynamic chemistry. Mushu's role was expanded to a main character as the story evolved. The silent cricket character Cri-Kee was added to balance him, since Mushu is the only character who can understand Cri-Kee's chirps.

Murphy accepted the role partially because he wanted to make some films that his own children could watch, having mostly starred in movies intended for adults prior to Mulan. He was also one of its few non-Asian main cast members. Due to his busy filming schedule, Murphy requested that Disney allow him to record his part from his home studio in Englewood, New Jersey, to where Disney brought character sketches. According to Tony, they were forced to comply with Murphy's demands to avoid the risk of not completing his animation on time, which he admitted ultimately benefited the performance. Murphy did little improvisation because the part had already been written for him. Songwriters Matthew Wilder and David Zippel had written at least two songs intended for Mushu to sing when he introduces himself to Mulan. One of them, "Keep 'Em Guessing", would have taught Mulan about being a convincing male soldier. The song was cut because Murphy did not want to sing in the film, despite several attempts to re-write it to his liking. Tony felt Mushu's songs ruined the pacing of the film. They decided to replace it with Mushu introducing himself to Mulan in the manner of an African-American preacher because they felt they needed a big introduction in the song's absence. In 2020, Ming-Na Wen, who voices Mulan, revealed that she had yet to meet Murphy in person, despite having voiced characters in the same film. Mushu was Murphy's first voice acting role, and Tom theorizes this inspired DreamWorks to eventually cast him as Donkey in the Shrek franchise. Murphy is one of the film's few original cast members who did not reprise his role in the sequel Mulan II (2004), early versions of which had a dragon love interest for Mushu.

=== Design and personality ===
Tom was Mushu's supervising animator, and Chris Sanders was one of his character designers. Tom had originally expected to be assigned a less prominent character, but Mushu ultimately became his first job as a supervising animator. He was hired to work on Mushu a year before production began on Mulan, during a period when Disney had yet to cast the character or determine his personality. Additionally, character designer Harald Siepermann drew concept art from his studio in Germany for the first few weeks of production, but remained uncredited due to working less than 200 hours on the film. The animators had considered several animals for Mushu, including a two-headed serpent. At various stages of development, Mushu was changed from two different dragons who morph into one by the end of the film, to a phoenix, and finally a dragon. Due to constant script revisions early on, Tom drew generic versions of the character, avoiding poses and facial expressions.

Tom borrowed inspiration from several aspects of Chinese culture when designing the character, including woodblock printing and sculptures from temples. Although Disney had featured European-style dragons in several previous animated projects, Mushu was the studio's first Chinese dragon, and Tom worked to differentiate the character from his predecessors. The animator realized that Chinese and European dragons are very different in appearance, describing the former as "thin and snake-like while the European dragons were often thick and more like a crocodile". Tom also researched dragons and dragon-like characters from previous Disney films, including Elliott from Pete's Dragon (1977), Maleficent from Sleeping Beauty (1959) and the Hydra from Hercules (1997), while The Reluctant Dragon (1941) in particular was studied to see how animators approached a simplified, humorous dragon during the 1940s. Tom was also inspired by the work of fellow Disney animator Eric Goldberg, who had sketched Aladdin's Genie briefly transforming into a dragon. He described the final design of Mushu as a combination of many different animals, possessing "whiskers like a catfish, scales like a fish, cow ears, the hairy lip of a camel, horns like a goat and talons of an eagle". Tom made his own color models for the character, which was uncommon for a supervising animator to do. Although the animators had wanted Mushu's tail to be purple to match his horns, a Disney executive insisted that it be red like the rest of the character, much to Tony's chagrin. In an act of protest, the animators secretly colored his tail purple in one brief scene in the film when he is riding on Khan's back.

Tom refined Murphy's facial expressions, poses, and personality once Murphy was cast, attending at least two of his recording sessions. Murphy's performance greatly influenced Tom's drawings, spending as much as a week animating each scene while listening to tape recordings of Murphy's sessions. He was also inspired by Murphy's work in Trading Places (1983) and Saturday Night Live, specifically his facial expressions, joke delivery, and how he uses his hands, as well as prints of the actor's face. He maintains that the character is very similar to Murphy personality-wise. Despite Murphy's influence on Mushu, Tom said he incorporated more of himself into the dragon than his voice actor, and considers him a favorite of the characters he has worked on. He said he learned that DreamWorks animators had reviewed animation footage of Mushu when developing Donkey for Shrek, also voiced by Murphy. In an effort to appeal to older audiences, Disney omitted Mushu from Mulan's marketing campaign until two weeks before the film was released. Disney archivist Dave Smith described Mushu as boastful, brave, and excitable, a character who "has more than enough personality and bravado for the biggest dragons", despite his small size.

== Critical reception ==
At the time of Mulan's release, Mushu was generally well-received by American critics and audiences. Film critic Roger Ebert said the character "quickly grows on us", despite initially finding him unsettling due to the film's historical setting. Margaret A. McGurk of The Cincinnati Enquirer called Mushu "a major hoot ... although how this thoroughly modern American personality landed in ancient China is a pure mystery". JoBlo.com's Berge Garabedian crowned him the film's "real star", recalling that Mushu "managed to get a crack out of the audience during every single one of its wonderful appearances". Several reviewers compared Mushu and Murphy's performance to Robin Williams' Genie. Jeff Vice of the Deseret News said Murphy "has his share of amusing one-liners", despite feeling the actor was trying too hard to imitate Williams.

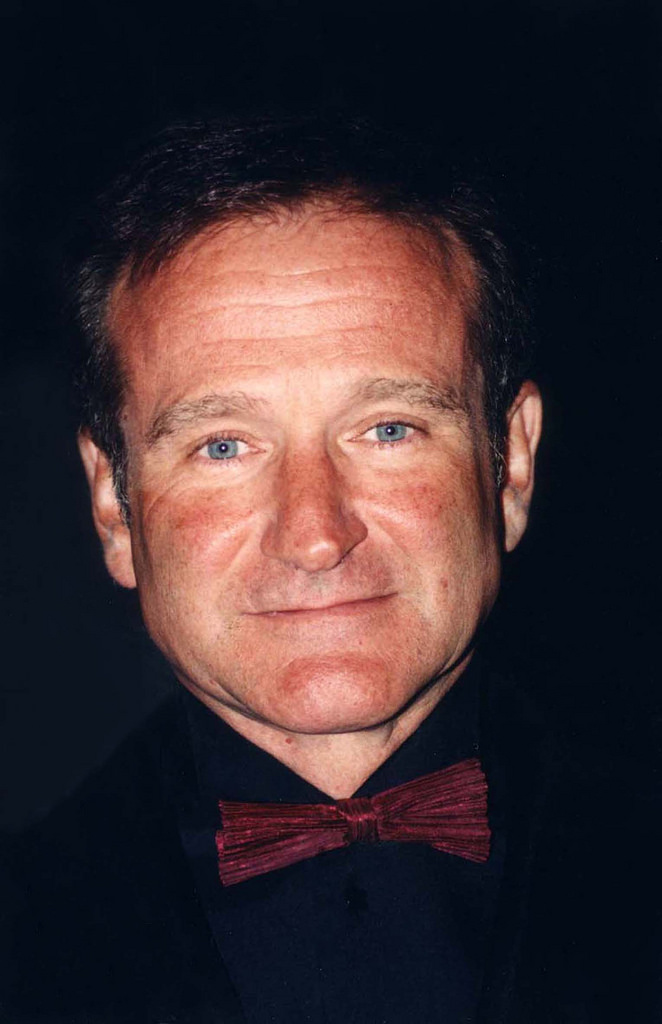
Critics compared Murphy's performance to Robin Williams work as the Genie in Aladdin.

Murphy's performance has received positive reviews. Critics found him funny in the role. Dan DiNicola of The Daily Gazette said he "delivers a knockout performance". Salon's Jenn Shreve said Murphy contributes enough comedy without hoarding the spotlight, and his character's clichés "seem to exist for the express purpose of being destroyed". Film critic Owen Gleiberman called Murphy irresistible, but wished his character had been given stronger material. Barbara Shulgasser of SFGate said the actor energizes an otherwise "dull movie". Essence considers Mushu to be one of Murphy's most iconic roles, while several publications including Entertainment Weekly have ranked it among the best performances of his career. Variety ranked Murphy's work as Mushu the 11th greatest voiceover performance in a Disney film, while MovieWeb and Game Rant ranked it 8th. Backstage named it among the 14 "Best Voice Acting Performances of All Time". Mushu also helped launch the family-friendly period of the actor's career, during which he acquired a younger fanbase by appearing in several family films; he did not star in another R-rated project until 2019. Tim Grierson of Cracked.com ranked Mushu his second-best family film performance, citing it as a precursor to his long-running role as Donkey in the Shrek franchise. According to a Metacritic article published in 2023, Mulan was the sixth best-reviewed film of Murphy's career to that point. Ethan Alter of Yahoo! Entertainment said the film capped the comedian's "successful mid-‘90s comeback".

Some critics argued that Mushu's comedic role in the film felt misplaced, superfluous, and distracting. Both Hollis Chacona of The Austin Chronicle and film critic Todd McCarthy described the character's anachronisms as jarring, despite finding some of his jokes amusing. Author Mari Ness called Murphy an irritating, unnecessary addition to the cast, criticizing his perceived reliance on anachronistic humor, and declaring him inferior to the Genie. Animation historian Jerry Beck said Mushu's jokes weaken the film and clash with its serious subject matter. In a separate review, Beck said he felt Murphy was "strictly stunt casting and his 'antics' stalled the story". Jeffrey Gantz of the Boston Phoenix dismissed him as a less interesting "African-American take on" sidekicks from Disney's Aladdin, The Lion King, and Hercules. For The New York Times, Janet Maslin criticized the film for relegating a "Black" character to a "servile clown". Mushu was negatively received in China. According to Country Living and The Baltimore Sun, some viewers found his characterization to be an inaccurate and insensitive depiction of Chinese culture. Alter felt that some of Murphy's material had not aged well in the decades since the film's release, specifically his character's jokes about Mongolian cuisine and wearing drag. However, Dennis E. Yi of The China Project argued that Chinese audiences were not offended by Mushu's depiction because he believes it is common to make jokes at the expense of "lower-tier" dragons in Chinese culture.

Anthony Brett of The Daily Telegraph and Petrana Radulovic of Polygon panned Mulan II for undoing Mushu's character development by having him attempt to sabotage Mulan and Shang's wedding. Brett also criticized Disney for replacing Murphy with white actor Mark Moseley, calling it "voiceover blackface". Kevin Wong of GameSpot called these changes to Mushu "the worst, most left-field aspect of Mulan II".

== Legacy ==
Mushu has been called a beloved and fan-favorite character from the Mulan franchise. Kelsey Dickson of Comic Book Resources described Mushu as Mulan's unsung hero, which Dickson attributed due to decisions and actions that inadvertently result in Mulan proving herself as a capable soldier and hero. Phil Pirrello of The A.V. Club ranked Mushu the 44th best Disney character of all time, describing him as a more fully-rounded supporting character than Aladdin's Genie. Disney Rewards and Esquire described Mushu as one of the studio's most beloved animated sidekicks, and Game Rant ranked him Disney's third best side character. In 2022, Entertainment Weekly reported that the character appears to be widely admired as a sidekick. The same publication said Mushu deserves his own spin-off, and Collider ranked him Disney's best animal sidekick. HuffPost ranked Mushu 14th on their "Definitive Ranking Of Disney Sidekicks". Country Living ranked him 29th, Bustle ranked him second, and Country 102.5 named him seventh. Several publications consider Mushu to be among the greatest dragons in popular culture, including MTV News, USA Today, Polygon, and Comic Book Resources. Collider ranked him the second greatest dragon in the history of cinema. In an article for The Guardian, author Julie Kagawa ranked Mushu the sixth best dragon across films and books, while The A.V. Club ranked him the ninth best movie dragon. Dictionary.com cited Mushu among pop culture's most famous dragons in 2022, noting that "This depiction differs from typical Chinese dragons, who are often portrayed as being elegant, imposing, and wise". Sketches and concept art of Mushu were featured in animator Tom Bancroft's book The Art of Disney's Dragons (2016). The character's popularity has led to him appearing in various tie-in media, including sequels, video games, and theme parks, notably Hong Kong Disneyland beginning with its opening ceremony in 2005. Mushu hosted The Magic of Disney Animation tour at Disney's Hollywood Studios.

Mushu has also been described as a controversial character. Chinese viewers are reported to have disliked the dragon upon the film's initial release. According to the University of Southern California professor Stanley Rosen, the character was well received in the United States, but accused by some Chinese audiences of trivializing their culture and Mulan's story. When the trailer for the 2020 live-action adaptation of the film was released, several fans complained about Mushu's absence from the preview on social media. Director Niki Caro confirmed that the character would not be in the remake, and discredited theories that the phoenix was "an updated version" of Mushu. Producer Jason Reed explained that Mushu was written out because "the dragon is a sign of respect and of strength and power and sort of using it as a silly sidekick did not play well with a traditional Chinese audience". Tom, Mushu's original animator, also appreciated that excluding the character from the remake would allow its creative team to release their own version of Mulan unhindered by expectations to adapt Mushu successfully.

Believed to have been written out of the remake due to concerns over cultural inaccuracy and racism, some academics and culture critics defended Disney's decision to exclude Mushu, describing it as the studio's attempt to depict Chinese culture and history more authentically. Olive Pometsey of British GQ found the adjustment necessary to adapt Mulan respectfully, and Esquire's Adrienne Westenfeld said the lack of Mushu resulted in a stronger, more self-sufficient Mulan. However, Jeva Lange of The Week reported that Chinese fans also expressed disappointment over Mushu's exclusion on the Chinese microblogging platform Weibo. According to Rebecca Davis of Variety, Chinese audiences bemoaned the absence of Mushu upon the remake's release in China, and by July 2019, the Weibo hashtag "There's no Mushu dragon in Mulan" had been viewed over 310 million times by Chinese users. In a review for CNN, historian Kelly Hammond panned the removal of Mushu as one of the remake's biggest missteps, which she said caused the film to rely on outdated jokes from male soldiers for comic relief. Lange opined that Mushu's absence deprives the remake's version of Mulan of meaningful dialogue by removing the supporting character with whom she shared most conversations, suggesting that he could have been reimagined as a more serious character, a female dragon, or another sort of character entirely, instead of eliminated altogether.
