= Vampire in Brooklyn =

1995 film directed by Wes Craven

- Theatrical release poster
- Directed by: Wes Craven
- Screenplay by: Charles Q. Murphy; Michael Lucker; Chris Parker
- Story by: Eddie Murphy; Vernon Lynch; Charles Q. Murphy
- Produced by: Eddie Murphy; Mark Lipsky
- Starring: Eddie Murphy; Angela Bassett; Allen Payne; Kadeem Hardison; John Witherspoon; Zakes Mokae; Joanna Cassidy
- Cinematography: Mark Irwin
- Edited by: Patrick Lussier
- Music by: J. Peter Robinson
- Production company: Eddie Murphy Productions
- Distributed by: Paramount Pictures
- Release date: October 27, 1995
- Running time: 102 minutes
- Language: English
- Budget: $14 million
- Box office: $35 million

Vampire in Brooklyn is a 1995 American vampire horror comedy film directed by Wes Craven. It stars Eddie Murphy, who produced and wrote with his step-father Vernon Lynch and brother Charles Q. Murphy. The film co-stars Angela Bassett, Allen Payne, Kadeem Hardison, John Witherspoon, Zakes Mokae, and Joanna Cassidy. Murphy also plays an alcoholic preacher, Pauly, and a foul-mouthed Italian-American mobster, Guido.

Vampire in Brooklyn was the final film produced under Eddie Murphy's exclusive contract with Paramount Pictures, which began with 48 Hrs. (1982) and included the Beverly Hills Cop franchise (1984–1994).

Vampire in Brooklyn was released on October 27, 1995, and initially received mostly negative reviews, with critics citing its uneven mix of horror and comedy. The film struggled at the box office, grossing $19.8 million in the United States, but earned a total of $35 million worldwide against a $14 million budget. Over time, it gained a cult following, with critical re-evaluation praising Craven's direction, Murphy and Bassett's performances and chemistry, and its blend of horror and comedy.

== Plot ==
In Brooklyn, New York City, an abandoned, decrepit ship crashes into a dockyard. Ship inspector Silas Green discovers it is full of ravaged corpses and a wolf, which leaves the ship. His co-worker and nephew Julius Jones flees in terror, running into gangsters to whom he owes money. The wolf, in his true form as the powerful, millennia-old vampire Maximillian (Max), intervenes and is shot, but instantly heals from his injuries. After killing the gangsters, Max forces Julius to consume his blood, transforming him into a decaying, subservient ghoul. Seemingly the last of his kind, Max explains that a lone vampire is doomed and so he must find and fully transform the only known half-vampire woman to exist before the next full moon.

Unaware of her vampire heritage, NYPD Detective Rita Veder is struggling with the recent death of her mentally ill mother and is tormented by unexplained visions which cause her colleagues to ostracize and mock her. As she and her partner, Detective Justice, investigate the ship murders, Max enacts his plan to isolate Rita by seducing and killing her roommate Nikki, and convincing her that Nikki and Justice, for whom she has romantic feelings, were having sex. Max uses his transformative powers to kill and take the guise of her preacher and a criminal, further guiding her down his intended path while causing her to distrust Justice. Max later saves Rita from being run over by a taxi and she agrees to have dinner with him. He magically gives Julius' dilapidated apartment a luxurious appearance and successfully enthralls Rita, tearing off her crucifix necklace and biting her.

The next day, while investigating Julius's potential involvement in the ship murders, Justice learns that Rita spent the night with Max and is informed that Nikki's body has been found. Justice finds Rita in her apartment, having slept all day, and tells her that Nikki was found posed as in one of Rita's visions, suggesting they are prophetic. Rita reconciles with Justice but almost instinctually bites him before seeing her fading reflection in the mirror. She confronts Max about the changes occurring in her. Max reveals that Rita's father was a vampire and he had told him where to find her before his death at the hands of vampire hunters; his death was responsible for driving Rita's mother insane. Max encourages Rita to accept her transformation, demonstrating his vampiric abilities and reminding her that humans have mistreated her.

Justice seeks help from vampire expert Dr. Zeko, who knew Rita's mother when she was researching the vampires of the Caribbean Islands and met Rita's father; Zeko explains that Rita's transformation will be irreversible if she feeds on human blood. Max takes Rita hunting but she refuses to drink a victim's blood, causing her to grow weak, and she seeks divine help at a graveyard.

At Julius' apartment, Justice and Zeko intervene before Max can force her to drink Silas' blood. Max incapacitates Zeko and beats Justice, offering the almost fully transformed Rita his blood. Though tempted, and admitting the powerful connection between herself and Max, Rita refuses and impales Max through the heart, rejecting her vampiric half. Max's magic fades as his body turns to smoke and a bat-like spirit flies into the night. Rita is cured of her vampirism, recovers her necklace, and kisses Justice.

Outside, the thoroughly decayed and rotting Julius finds Max's ring and puts it on, instantly transforming him into a fully healed and restored vampire. Acknowledging that Julius is in charge, Silas drives him away in Max's limo to parts unknown.

== Cast ==
- Eddie Murphy as Maximillian/Preacher Pauly/Guido
- Angela Bassett as Detective Rita Veder
- Allen Payne as Detective Justice
- Kadeem Hardison as Julius Jones
- John Witherspoon as Silas Green
- Zakes Mokae as Dr. Zeko
- Joanna Cassidy as Captain Dewey
- W. Earl Brown as Police Officer
- Simbi Khali as Nikki
- Ray Combs as Game Show Host
- John LaMotta as Lizzy
- Jerry Hall as Woman in Park

== Production ==
=== Development ===
Vampire in Brooklyn originated from an idea developed by Eddie Murphy and his brother Charlie Murphy, who wrote the original screenplay with their half-brother Vernon Lynch Jr. During a 1992 appearance on The Arsenio Hall Show, Murphy announced plans to direct the film himself after completing Beverly Hills Cop III (1994). He envisioned a comedy combining vampires, Brooklyn, rap music and horror, with rapper Flavor Flav playing the vampire's assistant. Rather than portraying the vampire, Murphy intended to appear in several supporting roles, including two elderly neighbors, a Jewish man and a Korean shopkeeper.

The project eventually took a different direction. By 1994, Murphy had one film remaining on his contract with Paramount Pictures, and Wes Craven had been brought in to direct. Craven later recalled that he and Murphy shared an agent, Andrea Eastman, who introduced them. Murphy admired Craven's The Hills Have Eyes (1977) and had specifically expressed interest in working with him. During their first meeting, Craven remembered Murphy sitting down at a grand piano and playing jazz before turning around and quoting a line from the film.

Screenwriters Michael Lucker and Chris Parker were subsequently hired to rewrite the screenplay. The two had previously worked together at Amblin Entertainment, while Parker had also worked in development for Craven's production company. They had earlier written a Western about two orphans who join forces with an outlaw. Murphy liked the script and expressed interest in playing the outlaw, but Paramount declined to pursue the project.

According to Lucker, Charlie Murphy and Lynch had spent approximately a year developing Vampire in Brooklyn before he and Parker became involved. After reading their screenplay, the two writers proposed several changes, which Charlie and Lynch accepted. Lucker and Parker then pitched their version to Craven, who arranged meetings with Paramount executives before sending them to New York to meet Murphy. The process moved quickly, with Lucker recalling that the film was greenlit "in less than four weeks."

Parker remembered that their meeting with Murphy took place at the actor's apartment overlooking Central Park. In the middle of their pitch, Murphy suddenly got up and began playing the piano. Parker noticed a photograph of Los Angeles district attorney Gil Garcetti beside the instrument and remarked that he looked like Skeletor. Murphy stopped playing, examined the photograph and agreed. According to Parker, the joke broke the ice, and the meeting went smoothly afterward.

At the time, Murphy saw the project as an opportunity to explore a different kind of role. In a 1995 interview with Joe Leydon, he explained that he had long wanted to play a villain and was particularly interested in horror films and Craven's work. Although Maximillian was conceived as a largely serious character, his ability to assume different identities allowed Murphy to incorporate comedy without having to play the vampire himself for laughs. In a separate interview with Bobbie Wygant, Murphy recalled that the production had originally been approached as a small horror film before developing into a larger project.

=== Casting ===
As one of the film’s producers, Eddie Murphy was involved in its casting. He approached Jada Pinkett about appearing in Vampire in Brooklyn, but she turned down the offer. Angela Bassett was finally cast as Detective Rita Veder. She had previously appeared in an episode of the NBC television series Nightmare Cafe (1992), which Wes Craven had co-created and executive-produced.

Murphy personally requested Allen Payne for the role of Rita’s police partner and love interest, Detective Justice. Payne described the opportunity to appear alongside Murphy in a film for which the actor had specifically requested him as a particularly meaningful moment in his career.

Murphy also took a personal interest in the casting of Kadeem Hardison as Julius Jones, Maximillian’s reluctant assistant. Hardison, a longtime admirer of Murphy, later recalled receiving a telephone call from the actor himself. Murphy told him that he had watched the audition tapes and believed Hardison was the only person suited to the role. Hardison was astonished by the call and later remembered working alongside Murphy as one of the highlights of his career.

John Witherspoon was cast as Julius’s uncle, Silas Green. He had previously worked with Murphy on Boomerang (1992), in which he played Mr. Jackson. The two had known each other for years, and Witherspoon recalled that Murphy had specifically wanted him for Vampire in Brooklyn.

The supporting cast included several actors who had previously worked with Craven. Zakes Mokae, who played Dr. Zeko, had appeared in The Serpent and the Rainbow (1988), while Joanna Cassidy, cast as Captain Dewey, had starred in Invitation to Hell (1984). Smaller roles went to Mitch Pileggi, who had played the villain in Shocker (1989); Wendy Robie, who had appeared in The People Under the Stairs (1991); Nick Corri, who had played Rod Lane in A Nightmare on Elm Street (1984); and W. Earl Brown, who had appeared in Wes Craven’s New Nightmare (1994).

=== Direction and tone ===
The film’s combination of horror and comedy became a source of disagreement between Eddie Murphy, Wes Craven and Paramount Pictures. According to screenwriter Chris Parker, studio executives wanted a comedy despite Murphy’s desire to play Maximillian as a serious character. Parker recalled being told, “Eddie Murphy does not want to be funny. It’s your job to trick him into being funny.” His co-writer Michael Lucker described their screenplay as a dark comedy, but believed that the conflicting expectations ultimately hurt the film. “Wes kinda wanted Freddy Krueger aspects,” he recalled. “Paramount wanted Axel Foley, the ‘bad brotha,’ as a vampire. Eddie thought this could have been his dramatic debut a la Shakespeare.”

Editor Patrick Lussier remembered Murphy wanting something closer to Craven’s The Serpent and the Rainbow (1988), while Paramount envisioned a horror version of Beverly Hills Cop. According to Lussier, earlier drafts had been considerably darker and more closely connected to Brooklyn. He also recalled Craven describing a meeting in which a Paramount executive, after watching footage from the film, insisted that it needed to be funny in the manner of Jack Nicholson’s performance in The Shining (1980). Craven reportedly questioned the comparison.

Composer J. Peter Robinson similarly recalled that Craven was under considerable pressure from Eddie Murphy, who wanted to make an Eddie Murphy film, while Craven wanted to make a horror movie. According to Robinson, the studio had its own expectations, leaving those involved in the production caught between competing creative demands.

Charlie Murphy credited Craven with changing the characterization of Maximillian. The vampire had originally been written without any redeeming qualities, but Craven encouraged the writers to make him someone audiences could care about. “Maximilian wasn’t going to have any redeeming qualities,” Charlie recalled. “But Wes taught us that we must get the audience to care about our characters.”

At the time of the film’s release, Craven defended the decision to portray Maximillian seriously. In an October 1995 interview, he explained that he wanted the humor to emerge from the story rather than from Murphy playing the vampire for laughs. He hoped to avoid the broader comic approach of films such as Love at First Bite (1979).

Craven later expressed reservations about how that approach had worked in practice. Speaking to Mick Garris, he recalled that Murphy "didn’t want to be funny at all. He wanted to play it totally straight, so I couldn’t get the humor into it that I wanted to get into it." Although he admired Murphy’s talent and ability to portray several characters, Craven felt that the actor’s reluctance to embrace comedy had limited what they could achieve.

In The Directors: Take Three, Craven also recalled wanting Maximillian to show greater vulnerability, an approach Murphy resisted in favor of maintaining the vampire’s dark, controlled demeanor. Craven observed that Murphy seemed more relaxed when portraying his other characters, particularly under the elaborate makeup that made him difficult to recognize. He felt that these disguises gave Murphy a freedom he did not display as Maximillian.

In another retrospective interview, Craven explained that Murphy had also been reluctant to portray Maximillian as an outright villain. Although Murphy wanted to make a horror film, Craven believed the character needed to be more openly evil. He felt that Murphy was concerned with maintaining his image as a leading man, particularly his physical appearance, and contrasted this with the freedom the actor displayed in The Nutty Professor (1996), in which he played several members of the Klump family. Craven also recalled difficulties arising from the involvement of several members of Murphy’s family and other disagreements he declined to discuss in detail.

Cinematographer Mark Irwin remembered Murphy’s intentions differently. While Parker and Lucker recalled the actor favoring a more dramatic approach, Irwin believed Murphy often preferred jokes and a lighter performance. Parker acknowledged Irwin’s recollection but said it did not match his own experience or what Craven had told him. Irwin nevertheless considered the mixture of horror and comedy one of the production’s greatest challenges, observing that comedy was particularly difficult because everyone involved had a different idea of what was funny.

During a 1995 appearance on Late Show with David Letterman, Murphy described himself and his brothers as longtime horror fans. He compared Vampire in Brooklyn to John Landis’s An American Werewolf in London (1981), explaining that he was drawn to its combination of frightening scenes and unexpected humor.

=== Filming ===
Although filming was initially scheduled to begin in January 1995, production was underway by the autumn of 1994. Principal photography took place primarily in Los Angeles, where the Paramount Pictures backlot and other locations were used to recreate Brooklyn. The shoot reportedly lasted 55 days, with three days spent in New York City. Cinematographer Mark Irwin, however, recalled filming in Brooklyn for only one day. He described the difficulties of making Los Angeles resemble New York, particularly the shortage of parked cars needed to give the streets an authentic appearance.

Among the Los Angeles locations was the Cambria Apartments, a three-story building on South Union Street whose residents had recently formed a cooperative and purchased the property. According to a November 1994 report in the Los Angeles Times, the production transformed the building into a rundown Brooklyn tenement using movable walls, worn furniture and atmospheric lighting. A scene involving a coffin being carried up a staircase was filmed repeatedly throughout the night. Paramount paid the residents’ cooperative $10,000, which was intended to help finance further renovations.

Angela Bassett later recalled the demands of filming Vampire in Brooklyn and Strange Days (1995) back-to-back. Speaking at the Santa Barbara International Film Festival in 2023, she said the two productions had involved approximately eight months of night shoots. To sleep during the day, she covered her bedroom windows with aluminum foil and disconnected her telephone. She joked that the experience had made her feel like a vampire. Bassett also recalled feeling claustrophobic while filming a scene in which Craven had her enclosed inside a coffin.

John Witherspoon recalled having considerable freedom to improvise as Silas. According to Witherspoon, Murphy had specifically asked that he be allowed to make up his own dialogue, although Craven initially preferred that he follow the screenplay. The director eventually embraced the improvisation, taking notes whenever Witherspoon came up with a line he liked so that the actor could repeat it for subsequent camera angles. Witherspoon found this more difficult than expected, since he often could not remember what he had said. By the end of filming, he recalled, he had largely returned to the script.

Kadeem Hardison also remembered the shoot fondly, particularly the opportunity to work alongside Murphy and Allen Payne. In a 2014 social media post, he recalled Craven encouraging the cast to make scenes funnier. Hardison later described Murphy as a master of improvisation and himself as a student trying to keep up. Recalling one scene, he said Craven had shown him footage of Maximillian crashing through a window to help him understand how frightened Julius should be. Hardison instead turned the moment into a joke, having Julius tell the vampire to jump back through the window.

Editor Patrick Lussier recalled that Zakes Mokae “wasn’t in the best of health” during filming and had difficulty remembering some of his dialogue. Wes Craven was concerned about the footage, and several takes were needed to complete Mokae’s scenes with Angela Bassett. Lussier said the scenes ultimately came together well in the editing room, leaving Craven pleased with the result.

Other aspects of the production were less harmonious. Screenwriter Michael Lucker recalled that Murphy objected to a scene involving a preacher on religious grounds and revised the material during filming. Irwin said Murphy sometimes remained in his trailer for extended periods, leaving the crew waiting. He recalled that Murphy would watch recordings of Leon Spinks boxing matches and that Bassett occasionally had to perform opposite Murphy’s stand-in, Roger. Cinematographer Mark Irwin was considerably more critical, describing the production as a “true nightmare.” He attributed much of the difficulty to Murphy’s apparent lack of enthusiasm and felt that Craven, who was eager to establish himself within the Hollywood studio system, had little control over the situation.

Craven described the film as one of his more expensive productions, although its budget remained modest by studio standards. He recalled that the financial limitations were particularly challenging given the expense of shooting on the Paramount lot. Craven also remembered Murphy frequently calling him at around three in the morning, knowing that they were both night owls. He observed that Murphy seemed most relaxed when wearing the makeup for his supporting characters, sometimes even leaving the studio in disguise so that he could move around in public without being recognized.

Craven also recalled disagreements arising from the involvement of several members of Murphy’s family, along with other personal issues. He felt that Paramount’s decision to shoot much of the film on its backlot had restricted what he could achieve visually.

Budget restrictions led to significant changes in the screenplay. Lussier recalled that early drafts had been “amazing” but were too expensive to produce. Many of the film’s horror and dramatic sequences were replaced with dialogue-heavy scenes to reduce costs. Screenwriter Michael Lucker recalled that an elaborate action sequence planned for the Brooklyn Bridge was abandoned in favor of a confrontation in Maximillian’s apartment. Lussier described an earlier version of the climax involving an oil tanker truck hanging off the Brooklyn Bridge, with Eddie Murphy, Angela Bassett and Allen Payne involved in the sequence. He estimated that the film’s first cut ran approximately 145 minutes, describing it as largely consisting of dialogue.

Actor Clifton Powell later described a dispute with a sound technician during his time on the production. According to Powell, the disagreement began when he refused to have a microphone wire placed in his hair and the technician suggested recording his dialogue in post-production. Powell considered the response racially motivated and complained to the first assistant director. After a second confrontation, he threatened to leave the film and contacted his manager. Powell said a producer persuaded him to stay, and he completed his scheduled week of filming, although relations with the crew remained strained afterward.

=== Makeup and visual effects ===
The film’s visual effects were handled in part by Hammerhead Productions, a relatively new company at the time. The work included digital morphing sequences, glowing eyes and transformations between Maximillian’s human and animal forms. Computer animator Larry Weiss recalled that much of the work involved Murphy’s teeth, his transformations and the vampire’s eyes. Visual effects supervisor Thad Beier described the limitations of the technology available to the company, recalling that four-gigabyte hard drives cost approximately $1,400 each.

Practical makeup effects were used to create Maximillian’s more monstrous appearance and the gradual physical deterioration of his assistant, Julius. The special makeup effects team included Robert Kurtzman, Greg Nicotero and Howard Berger of KNB EFX Group, who worked on makeup application and puppetry effects.[18] The production also combined live animals with mechanical props. For a scene in which a cobra breaks out of an aquarium and approaches Rita, most of the snake’s movements were performed using an animatronic model. In another scene, a live cockroach was filmed crawling across a desk, while a prop insect was used for the moment Julius eats it.

Maximillian’s long-haired wig presented a separate challenge for cinematographer Mark Irwin. He recalled that its synthetic texture reflected the lighting and that concealing the hairline during close-ups was particularly difficult. Irwin compared Murphy’s appearance to that of singer Nick Ashford and remembered Murphy making the same comparison when he first arrived on set wearing the wig. Screenwriter Chris Parker likened the hairstyle to a Rick James wig. Irwin attributed its design to Murphy’s makeup artist, Toy Van Lierop.[17]

The visual effects were produced by Hammerhead, then a new studio. Early digital tools were used for morphing sequences, glowing eyes, and vampire transformations. Animator Larry Weiss recalled that much of the work focused on “Eddie’s teeth, his morphing into and out of animal forms, and his glowing eyes.” Visual effects supervisor Thad Beier noted the challenges of limited computing resources, saying: “We had to buy four-gigabyte drives that cost $1,400 each — that was all the money we had.”

=== Stunt accident ===
The production was marked by the death of stuntwoman Sonja Davis, who was working as Angela Bassett's double. On November 3, 1994, Davis was performing a 42-foot (13 m) backward fall from a building in Los Angeles when she struck an airbag positioned below. She suffered severe injuries and died on November 16, after spending 13 days in a coma. Her mother, Wanda Sapp, and brother Patrick were present during the stunt, which Patrick recorded on video.

According to Sapp, Davis had expressed reservations about the jump and repeatedly questioned whether it was safe. She had reportedly wanted to perform the fall facing forward rather than backward. An investigation by the California Division of Occupational Safety and Health (Cal/OSHA) subsequently found that the airbag was improperly positioned and unsuitable for the stunt, that safety spotters had not been assigned, and that the required test drops and practice jumps had not been performed.

The accident also raised questions about the production's filming permit. A November 1994 report in the Los Angeles Times revealed that the permit listed a dummy falling from a building onto a parked car but did not mention Davis's stunt. State officials opened an investigation, while Paramount declined to comment pending its completion.

In February 1995, Davis's family filed a $10 million wrongful-death lawsuit against Paramount Pictures, Eddie Murphy Productions, Murphy, Craven and stunt coordinator Alan Oliney. The complaint alleged that the production had failed to provide adequate safety equipment. Cal/OSHA subsequently issued four citations against Paramount and imposed approximately $29,000 in fines. The studio denied wrongdoing and appealed the citations. The outcome of the lawsuit remains unclear.

=== Music ===
The musical score for Vampire in Brooklyn was composed by J. Peter Robinson, who had previously collaborated with Wes Craven on the television series Nightmare Cafe (1992) and Wes Craven’s New Nightmare (1994). Robinson recalled that their working relationship began during Nightmare Cafe, making his subsequent involvement in Craven’s films a natural continuation of their collaboration.

The film’s soundtrack features songs by Salt-N-Pepa, MC Hammer, Hugh Masekela and Meshell Ndegeocello, including “Whatta Man”, “Pray”, “No Woman, No Cry” and “If That’s Your Boyfriend (He Wasn’t Last Night)”. Stevie Wonder’s “Superstition” appears in two versions: one performed by the British reggae band UB40 and another produced by Robinson, featuring additional rap lyrics by Clive Ross.

== Reception ==
=== Release and box office ===
Vampire in Brooklyn was released theatrically in the United States by Paramount Pictures on October 27, 1995, four days before Halloween. The film received an R rating from the Motion Picture Association of America for strong language and vampire violence.

The film opened in 2,307 theaters and grossed $7,045,379 during its first weekend, placing third at the domestic box office behind Get Shorty, which retained the top position in its second weekend, and fellow newcomer Powder. It finished just behind Powder, which earned approximately $7.1 million, and ahead of another new release, the psychological thriller Copycat, which opened in fourth place with approximately $5.2 million.

In its second weekend, Vampire in Brooklyn fell to fifth place, earning $4.4 million, a decline of approximately 38 percent. It dropped to ninth place the following weekend. The film ultimately grossed approximately $19.7 million in the United States and Canada against a reported production budget of $14 million.

=== Critical response ===
Vampire in Brooklyn received mostly negative reviews and was considered at the time as a lesser film of both Murphy and Craven. The next year in 1996, Craven moved on to the hugely successful Scream franchise, while Murphy began concentrating on more family-friendly movies, with his remake The Nutty Professor. On Rotten Tomatoes the film has an approval rating of 14% based on reviews from 36 critics, and the site's consensus is: "Neither scary nor very funny, this misguided effort never lives up to its premise." On Metacritic, it has a score of 27% based on reviews from 17 critics. Audiences polled by CinemaScore gave the film an average grade of "B+" on an A+ to F scale.

Critics like Peter Stack of the San Francisco Chronicle found Eddie Murphy's performance as the vampire Maximillian “strangely cumbersome,” describing the film as “neither funny nor frightening.” Murphy's portrayal was criticized for lacking the intensity of a true vampire, with Roger Ebert lamenting that Murphy's attempt at a darker, more serious role left him “comically missing.” Wes Craven's direction was also divisive. While some, like Adrian Martin, praised Craven for his ability to balance horror and humor, calling it “Craven's best movie since Shocker,” most felt the tone was uneven. Desson Howe of the Washington Post noted the film lacked tension: “It’s neither all that scary nor all that hilarious,” while Gene Siskel summed it up as a “clunker” despite Craven's experience. The supporting cast, especially Kadeem Hardison as Julius, provided some comic relief, but the humor often fell flat, as Owen Gleiberman from Entertainment Weekly put it, describing the film's gags as “lame.” Meanwhile, Angela Bassett, despite her strong presence, was underutilized, with Hal Hinson from the Washington Post calling it a waste of her talents. Ultimately, Vampire in Brooklyn failed to live up to its potential, with Caryn James of the New York Times saying it was a film that couldn't capitalize on Murphy's appeal, and Roger Ebert quipping, “to call this a comeback for Murphy is a sign of blind faith.” The film's erratic mix of horror, comedy, and romance led many critics to label it as an “uneven” and “forgettable” misfire.

== Legacy ==
=== Critical reassessment ===
At the time of its release, Vampire in Brooklyn was seen as one of Murphy and Craven's lesser films, something Murphy acknowledged in a 2016 interview:

Well, I don't think The New Yorker will be singing the praises of Meet Dave. 'That was a gem!' I don't know if there's some Pluto Nash Appreciation Club out there. The Friends of Holy Man Group. The Vampire in Brooklyn Club.

Since its release, Vampire in Brooklyn become a cult classic. In his book Wes Craven: The Art of Horror, John Kenneth Muir praised the film’s humor, special effects, musical score, and the chemistry between Eddie Murphy and Angela Bassett. Film critic Joe Leydon described it as one of his “guiltiest among my guilty pleasures.”

Several retrospective reviews have reassessed the film more favorably. Charles Pulliam More of Gizmodo called it one of the most underrated horror films, while Monique Jones of Shadow and Act considered it an unusual entry in Murphy’s filmography. Andrew Shearer of Online Athens also singled it out as one of Murphy’s most underrated performances. Other favorable assessments appeared in Syfy Wire, CinemaBlend, Screen Rant, and Essence, with critics particularly praising the film’s humor, performances, and combination of horror and comedy. In 2022, Hal Young of Senses of Cinema argued that the film's mixture of horror and comedy had aged better than some of Craven's other work. Although Ty Weinert of Collider ranked it among Craven's weakest films, he praised the direction and the chemistry between Murphy and Bassett. Later reviews from Fangoria, /Film, and Decider similarly acknowledged the film's shortcomings while finding merit in its performances and unusual tone.

Bassett's performance has received particular attention in retrospective reviews. Critics from Essence, Screen Rant, Collider, and /Film have included the film among her notable roles. Andscape's Marcus Shorter argued that despite Murphy's leading billing, the film largely belongs to Bassett.

In 2023, Bassett received the Montecito Award at the Santa Barbara International Film Festival. The festival's executive director, Roger Durling, singled out Vampire in Brooklyn as one of the most underrated movies of Bassett's filmography.

For the film's 25th anniversary, Rotten Tomatoes released a podcast titled "Rotten Tomatoes score is wrong about Vampire in Brooklyn" that attempted to justify why "Vampire in Brooklyn" should have received a higher score calling it a "cult classic" especially for the "under-appreciated sense of the bizarre, a killer score, and some serious chemistry between Murphy and Angela Bassett". They also added: "Look closely, and there are glimmers of Craven's keen sense of the horror-comedy mix, and Murphy's natural-born charisma."

The film received further attention around its 30th anniversary in 2025. Jesse Hassenger of Decider described it as a flawed but entertaining horror comedy, while Sharai Bohannon of Dread Central discussed its place in Black horror cinema and its influence on later films. Isaac Rouse of Polygon similarly praised its connection to Blacula and blaxploitation cinema, while acknowledging the conflicting creative approaches behind its production.

Quentin Tarantino praised Eddie Murphy’s performance in Vampire in Brooklyn but was sharply critical of Wes Craven’s work on the film. Speaking on The Video Archives Podcast, he said, “The problem with Vampire in Brooklyn is Eddie Murphy is so good playing that character that the movie is just nowhere good enough.” He felt Murphy played the role as though he were starring in a great horror film, but dismissed Craven’s work as “hack work”.

=== Influence on pop culture ===
The film has continued to be referenced in popular culture. Singer and actress Teyana Taylor has been photographed wearing a T-shirt featuring its poster, while actor Jonathan Majors dressed as Maximillian for Halloween. Characters dressed as Maximillian’s associate Preacher Pauly and Detective Rita Veder also appeared in Scream VI (2023), as part of a tribute to Wes Craven’s films. Rapper Action Bronson referenced Vampire in Brooklyn in his 2020 song “Cliff Hanger.” Bronson also called it one of Murphy's best films in an interview with The Ringer. Ahead of the release of his 2020 music video for “Rodeo”, Rapper Lil Nas X shared an image from Vampire in Brooklyn among several visual inspirations for the video.

In 2025, Michael B. Jordan named Vampire in Brooklyn as his favorite vampire film, recalling how seeing Eddie Murphy in the role had made an impression on him. Actor Omar Miller also praised Murphy’s portrayal of Maximillian.

=== The cast and crew's thoughts on the film ===
==== Eddie Murphy ====
It didn’t do well at the box office, but I like that picture. I pulled off what I wanted to do. I was trying to stretch. But I think that people who follow my movies said, ‘I wanna see him do something funny. I don’t want to see him as a vampire.”’

— Eddie Murphy (1996)

Despite its disappointing reception, Eddie Murphy defended Vampire in Brooklyn. In 1996, he said he had enjoyed making the film and welcomed the opportunity to play a different kind of character. “I was trying to stretch,” he explained, acknowledging that audiences were more accustomed to seeing him in comic roles. In another 1996 interview, conducted while he was filming Metro (1997), Murphy also disputed the perception that Vampire in Brooklyn had been a financial failure. “My movies have always made money. Even Vampire in Brooklyn made money — it cost $18 million to make and it made $20 million in the states. And I liked Vampire in Brooklyn. It's not like people hated it. They just didn't go to see it,” he said, maintaining that the film's disappointing box-office performance did not necessarily reflect audiences' opinions of it.

During a 2006 appearance on Inside the Actors Studio, Murphy was asked about several poorly received projects, including Vampire in Brooklyn, Metro (1997) and The PJs (1999–2001). He rejected the suggestion that they were bad, saying, “I don’t think those things sucked,” and argued that not every project appeals to everyone and that timing plays an important role in its reception.

In a 2011 interview with Rolling Stone, Murphy said: "The only way I was able to do Nutty Professor and to get out of my Paramount deal, I had to do Vampire in Brooklyn. But you know what ruined that movie? The wig. I walked out in that longhaired wig and people said, 'Oh, get the fuck out of here! What the hell is this?'"

In the 2025 Netflix documentary Being Eddie, Murphy joked about the film, saying, “If you could be in this business for 40 years, you’re gonna make something that’s not gonna work.” Referring to his character on the film, he added, “You got fangs, and you biting Angela Bassett. I’m like, ‘Okay now, I think we got a little off-track here.’”

In an subsequent interview with Jake Hamilton, Murphy clarified that he had been joking and said he had recently watched the film again. “I literally watched Vampire in Brooklyn two, three days ago — and it holds up,” he said, comparing it to Harlem Nights (1989), another film he had come to appreciate after revisiting it years later.

At the 2026 AFI Life Achievement Award ceremony, Murphy was asked what he would change about Vampire in Brooklyn. “The only thing I would have changed, I would have changed my hair. That was the thing that was so off-putting to people.” He went on to joke that many Black moviegoers immediately rejected the look because it did not resemble his usual appearance.

==== Cast and Crew ====
Other members of the production offered mixed assessments. In December 1995, Angela Bassett expressed disappointment with the finished film while retaining fond memories of making it. "I wish it were done better, but I had fun doing it," she told the Los Angeles Times. Wes Craven was similarly measured in his retrospective assessment, describing Vampire in Brooklyn as a "good, fun little film". Although he enjoyed the opportunity to direct a comedy, he believed that the screenplay "really hampered it". Marianne Maddalena, a longtime collaborator of Craven's, stated that making the film was a "strange" experience and called it a "strange studio movie“.

Screenwriter Michael Lucker recalled in 2015 that he regularly encountered people who knew lines from the film, particularly in Atlanta, where he lived. His co-writer Chris Parker was equally fond of the experience and said he was glad the film had been made.John Witherspoon and Kadeem Hardison also counted it among their favorite movies, remembering how much they enjoyed playing their characters and working with Murphy and Craven.

== See also ==
- Eddie Murphy filmography
- List of film accidents
- Vampire films
