= Black Pack =

Nickname given to a group of American comedy actors

The Black Pack is a nickname given to a group of Black American comedians/actors writers/directors who have worked together in many comedy film and television shows, mostly in the late 1980s and early 1990s. The group consists of Eddie Murphy, Arsenio Hall, Paul Mooney, Robert Townsend, and Keenen Ivory Wayans.

With their collaborations peaking from 1986 to 1992 before success and creative differences divided them into their own separate camps, various combinations of Black Pack members collaborated on a series of high-profile commercial films, TV series, and specials, including Hollywood Shuffle, Eddie Murphy Raw, Coming to America, The Arsenio Hall Show, and In Living Color.

The group formed an informal stock company of recurring actors who starred alongside them in their projects, including Damon Wayans, Kim Wayans, John Witherspoon, David Alan Grier, Anne-Marie Johnson, Robin Harris, and Murphy's Uncle Ray Murphy.

== Members ==
The Black Pack's members are Eddie Murphy, Arsenio Hall, Robert Townsend, and Keenen Ivory Wayans, who all came up in comedy clubs in New York and LA together in the late 70s and early 80s, plus elder statesmen Paul Mooney, who performed alongside them but had been doing comedy for several years before them.

Although those five are the only members of the Black Pack, other comedians and actors have been said to be a part of the group by media speculation or members of the Black Pack themselves, including Damon Wayans, Robin Harris, Chris Rock, and Charlie Murphy, although Charlie denies being a part of the group explaining that he was in the Navy when they were all coming up together in comedy clubs. Townsend suggested to the press that Spike Lee and Denzel Washington be a part of the group, but neither of them worked significantly with the five Black Pack members.

Inspired by his idol Elvis Presley, Murphy begun making public appearances with a large male entourage in the 1980s, which included his brother Charlie Murphy, cousin Ray Murphy Jr., various uncles including Uncle Ray Murphy (himself a former comedian), friends' uncles, bodyguards, and valets. The members of the Black Pack were not part of this entourage but occasionally hung out around them.

== History ==
=== Origins (1978-1980) ===
Robert Townsend and Keenen Ivory Wayans met in 1978 when Wayans was back home in New York City, on summer break from Tuskegee University. Townsend and Wayans met at the New York Improv, when trying to get spots to perform there as standup comedians. Later in 1978, Eddie Murphy, who had been performing in clubs around Long Island since he was 15 two years ago, met Wayans when he began auditioning to be a regular at the Improv, but after being passed over, Murphy began to perform at The Comic Strip.

=== Ascent (1980-1986) ===
In 1980, when Jean Doumanian took over being the lead producer of Saturday Night Live following the departure of Lorne Michaels and the show's entire cast and writing staff. In mid-September, having cast six white cast members, Doumanian held two days of auditions on the 17th story of SNL's offices at 30 Rockefeller Plaza, where Keenen Ivory Wayans auditioned, as part of a group of roughly 30 Black actors and comedians, to join the cast. From the audition, Doumanian hired standup Charlie Barnett, but there were issues with his ability to read cue cards, so he was let go. Next, she hired Robert Townsend to join the cast, but talent coordinator Neil Levy and other crew members convinced her to hire Murphy instead, before Townsend had signed his contract.

Meanwhile, in late 1980, Wayans move to Los Angeles and began performing at The Comedy Store. He subsequently convinced Townsend, who had become his best friend and collaborator, to move to LA, where the two of them began writing movies together. Arsenio Hall had arrived in LA in January of 1980 from Chicago and met and befriended Wayans while they were both auditioning to perform at The Comedy Store.

After a few episodes of not being used much on Saturday Night Live, Murphy took off and became the show's breakout star, springboarding off that into a successful career as the star of hit movies 48 Hrs., Trading Places, and Beverly Hills Cop. After a few episode of not being used on the show, Murphy took off and became the star of Saturday Night Live, springboarding off that into a successful career as the star of hit movies 48 Hrs., Trading Places, and Beverly Hills Cop.

As Murphy became a movie star off of his success on SNL, he grew closer with Hall, Townsend, Wayans, and Paul Mooney, who had co-written multiple projects with Richard Pryor. With Murphy as the most successful member of the Black Pack by far, the other members started to orbit him. He gave the others jobs, jokes, advice, gifts, and attended their standup shows.

=== Peak of Black Pack Collaborations (1986-1992) ===
In the mid-80s, Robert Townsend and Keenen Ivory Wayans made their first movie, Hollywood Shuffle, a comedy about their frustrations with the way Hollywood treated them as Black actors. The film was directed by Townsend, co-written by Townsend and Wayans, and starred Townsend with supporting performances from Wayans and a group of Black comedians and actors who would go on to serve as a kind of stock company for Wayans and Townsend, including Damon Wayans, Kim Wayans, John Witherspoon, and Anne-Marie Johnson.

Hollywood Shuffle was critically-acclaimed and grossed $5.2 million dollars off of its meager $100,000 budget. Townsend and Wayans showed Eddie Murphy, now one of Hollywood's biggest movie stars, a rough cut of the film, which inspired him to hire Townsend to direct his standup comedy film Eddie Murphy Raw and to hire Wayans to co-write the short film that opened the movie with him. Murphy hired Paul Mooney to perform standup to open for him on the Raw three-and-a-half-month tour that the concert film documented. Murphy and Mooney also began co-writing a film together.

During a press conference to promote his film Beverly Hills Cop II, Eddie Murphy announced the existence of the Black Pack, a creative alliance between him and comedians/writers/actors/directors Arsenio Hall, Paul Mooney, Robert Townsend, and Keenen Ivory Wayans. In 1988, The LA Times ran a piece on the group.

Murphy was so taken with the thriving scene of Black comedians surrounding the Leimert Park venue The Comedy Act that he produced a special for HBO called Uptown Comedy Express, which featured performances from Arsenio Hall and Paul Mooney.

Townsend and Wayans also began making HBO specials together, co-writing and co-starring in two Robert Townsend and His Partners and Crime specials in 1987 and 19988 that featured a variety show format consisting of sketches, standup, and music. The first special featured standup sets from Mooney and Keenen's younger brother Damon Wayans, who became a frequent collaborator of the group, as well as a breakout sketch called "The Bold, The Black, The Beautiful" which was a parody of soap operas starring a Black cast led by Townsend and Wayans. Following the success of Hollywood Shuffle, the two of them began writing another movie called The Five Heartbeats for themselves and Damon to star in as a fictional Motown group. The project was set up at Warner Bros. in 1988, but the studio later passed on the movie. According to Wayans, the Fox network made a series offer for a show based on their sketch, "The Bold, The Black, The Beautiful", but Townsend passed on the project. Townsend and Wayans stopped collaborating around this time, with Townsend making two more Robert Townsend and His Partners in Crime specials on his own and resurrecting The Five Heartbeats at 20th Century Fox. Keenen still received co-writing credit with Townsend, but the roles intended for Keenen and Damon were recast.

Following the end of his creative partnership with Townsend, Wayans began to focus on projects where he collaborated with his siblings. He asked Eddie Murphy to use an idea he came up with for a parody of Blacksploitation films called I'm Gonna Git You Sucka. Murphy gave him his blessing, and Wayans wrote, directed, and starred in the film, which featured a brief role from Townsend, as well as performances from Wayans's siblings Damon Wayans, Kim Wayans, Shawn Wayans, Marlon Wayans, as well as frequent Black Pack collaborators David Alan Grier, Chris Rock, John Witherspoon, and Robin Harris.

In 1987, Hall became the guest host-then-regular host of Fox's The Late Show, following Joan Rivers's exit from the program. Murphy became best friends with Hall around this time, and Hall accompanied Murphy when he pitched Coming to America to Paramount. They received a greenlight and began writing the script together before Murphy handed it off to Barry Blaustein and David Sheffield to finish writing. Murphy and Hall held sessions with screenwriters Blaustein and Sheffield at the Gulf & Western Building in Manhattan to work on the script. Murphy and Hall starred in the film, each playing multiple roles. It was a major box office hit, and Murphy followed it up with his directorial debut, Harlem Nights, a drama starring himself, Richard Pryor, and Redd Foxx that featured a small role from Hall.

Following Hall's stint as guest host of The Late Show, Fox failed to keep Hall at the network, despite his burgeoning popularity, and Paramount Television gave him his own syndicated talk show, The Arsenio Hall Show in 1989, which frequently featured Murphy as a guest and at one point featured Wayans as a guest. In 1990, Wayans created the sketch show In Living Color for Fox, which he also wrote and starred in. The show's cast also included frequent Black Pack collaborators Damon Wayans, Kim Wayans, and David Alan Grier, and Paul Mooney was briefly employed as a writer there on-and-off-again over the course of its first four seasons. Both The Arsenio Hall Show and In Living Color became big culture-defining hits, but the Black Pack was effectively split into different camps, something that Murphy publicly lamented.

The group worked together one last time, on A Party for Richard Pryor, an NBC special honoring Richard Pryor, the comedian who served as the biggest influence to the group, following his diagnosis with multiple sclerosis. Murphy hosted the special, with Hall, Townsend, and Wayans - every Black Pack member except Mooney - all serving as writers and appearing as themselves on it.

Following the final episode of In Living Color to feature both Wayans and Mooney as writers in 1992, no two members of the Black Pack worked together again for over two decades. After leaving In Living Color, Mooney did not work with any member of the Black Pack again until his death in 2021.

=== Reunions ===
Murphy and Hall reunited in 2013 when Murphy appeared as a guest on an episode of the reboot of The Arsenio Hall Show, and the two also collaborated again when they starred in a Coming to America sequel for Amazon called Coming 2 America in 2021. Hall also appeared in the Netflix documentary centered on Murphy, Being Eddie, and was also presented in Netflix's AFI Life Achievement Award tribute to Murphy, as did Townsend. Wayans has not collaborated with a member of the Black Pack since last working with Mooney on In Living Color in 1992.

== Unrealized Projects ==
- In 1980, Paul Townsend and Keenen Ivory Wayans were co-writing a movie about a basketball team stuck in a haunted house, but the film was never made.
- In 1987, Townsend and Wayans wrote a sketch called "The Bold, The Black, The Beautiful" for their HBO special, Robert Townsend & His Partners in Crime. It was a parody of soap operas starring a Black cast consisting of the two of them, Anne-Marie Johnson, Carl Alan Craig, and Stephanie E. Williams In a 1993 lawsuit against Townsend, Wayans claimed that they both intended to develop the sketch into a TV show in the late 80s and received a series order from the Fox network that Townsend made him turn down.
- In 1988, Paul Mooney told The LA Times that he and Eddie Murphy were writing a script about a slave with supernatural powers who refuses to use them because power corrupts.
- In 1988, Arsenio Hall told Vanity Fair that he was attached to star in a movie called The Butterscotch Kid, in which he'd play a traveling entertainer who gets stuck with a baby and has to take the baby on the road. Eddie Murphy's frequent screenwriters David Sheffield and Barry Blaustein, who had worked with Hall on Coming to America, were penning the script, and Hall told the press that Murphy wanted to direct.

== Filmography ==
Movie/Series/Special	Eddie Murphy	Arsenio Hall	Paul Mooney	Robert Townsend	Keenen Ivory Wayans	Close contributors
The Late Show (1987-1988)	Guest	Host		Guest Host/Guest/Guest Writer	Guest/Actor/Guest Writer	
Hollywood Shuffle (1987)			Supporting role	Star/Director/Co-writer/Producer	Supporting role/Co-writer	Damon Wayans, Kim Wayans, John Witherspoon, Anne-Marie Johnson, Bobby McGee, Carl Craig
Uptown Comedy Express (1987)	Producer/Cameo	Star		Star		Uncle Ray Murphy, Chris Rock, Marsha Warfield
Eddie Murphy Raw (1987)	Star/Producer/Writer			Director	Co-Writer	Kim Wayans
Robert Townsend and His Partners in Crime (1987)			Star	Star/Co-Writer/Director/Producer	Star/Co-Writer	Carl Craig, Anne-Marie Johnson, Bobby McGee, Damon Wayans, Kim Wayans, John Witherspoon
Coming to America (1988)	Star/Producer/Writer	Star				Uncle Ray Murphy
Take No Prisoners: Robert Townsend and His Partners in Crime II (1988)			Star	Star/Co-Writer/Director/Producer	Co-Writer	Damon Wayans, David Alan Grier, John Witherspoon, Shawn Wayans, Marlon Wayans
I'm Gonna Git You Sucka (1988)	Writer (uncredited)			Minor Role	Star/Writer/Director	Damon Wayans, John Witherspoon, Chris Rock, David Alan Grier, Robin Harris, Anne-Marie Johnson, Kim Wayans, Marlon Wayans, Shawn Wayans, Bobby McGee, Carl Craig
Harlem Nights (1989)	Star/Writer/Producer/Director	Minor Role				Richard Pryor, Robin Harris, Bobby McGee, Uncle Ray Murphy
The Arsenio Hall Show (1989-1994)	Recurring Guest	Host/Writer/Producer			Guest	Richard Pryor, Chris Rock, Marsha Warfield, Damon Wayans, Uncle Ray Murphy
In Living Color (1990-1994)			Writer		Star/Creator/Writer/Director/Producer	David Alan Grier, Damon Wayans, Kim Wayans, Shawn Wayans, Marlon Wayans, Anne-Marie Johnson, Chris Rock
1990 MTV Video Music Awards (1990)		Host/Writer			Minor Role/Writer	Damon Wayans
The Five Heartbeats (1991)				Star/Co-Writer/Director/Producer	Co-Writer	John Witherspoon, Anne-Marie Johnson, Bobby McGee
A Party for Richard Pryor (1991)	Host/Writer	Writer/Supporting Role		Writer/Supporting Role	Writer/Supporting Role	Richard Pryor, Marsha Warfield
The Comedy Store's 20th Birthday (1992)		Supporting Role	Supporting Role			Richard Pryor, Damon Wayans
The Soul Train Comedy Awards (1993)		Writer/Presenter			Writer/Presenter	Damon Wayans, Kim Wayans, Shawn Wayans, Marlon Wayans, Richard Pryor, Marsha Warfield, David Alan Grier, John Witherspoon
The Arsenio Hall Show (2013-2014)	Guest	Host/Producer				Marlon Wayans
Coming 2 America (2021)	Star/Producer	Star				
Being Eddie (2025)	Star	Minor role				Chris Rock
AFI Life Achievement Award: A Tribute to Eddie Murphy (2026)	Star	Supporting role		Supporting role		David Alan Grier, Chris Rock
