= How Could It Be =

1985 studio album by Eddie Murphy

Studio album by Eddie Murphy
- Released: September 1985
- Recorded: 1985
- Studio: Wonderland Studios, Joint Recording Studios, Soundworks Studios, Clinton Recording, Power Station
- Genre: R&B
- Length: 34:53
- Label: Columbia
- Producer: Rick James; Aquil Fudge; Stevie Wonder

Eddie Murphy chronology
Eddie Murphy: Comedian (1983)	How Could It Be (1985)	So Happy (1989)

Singles from How Could It Be
- 1. "Party All the Time" Released: September 23, 1985; 2. "How Could It Be" Released: 1985

How Could It Be is the debut musical studio album by comedian/actor Eddie Murphy, released in September 1985 on Columbia Records. It was produced by Aquil Fudge, with the exception of the hit top ten single "Party All the Time", which was produced by Rick James.

Professional ratings
Review scores
Source	Rating
AllMusic	2.5/5 stars
Robert Christgau	(C−)
New York Daily News	(unfavorable)
New York Daily News	1.5/4 stars
The Cincinnati Post	2/4 stars
The Cincinnati Enquirer	2/5 stars
Detroit Free Press	1/5 stars
The Boston Globe	(unfavorable)
The Gazette	(favorable)
The Buffalo News	(unfavorable)
The Commercial Appeal	(favorable)
Gannett News Service	(unfavorable)
The Honolulu Advertiser	(unfavorable)
The Canadian Press	(unfavorable)
Copley Press	(favorable)
Daily Press	(favorable)
The Morning Call	(unfavorable)
The Daily Oklahoman	(favorable)
Oakland Tribune	3/4 stars
Lexington Herald-Leader	(unfavorable)
Los Angeles Times	1/4 stars
The Toronto Star	(unfavorable)

The album was a moderate commercial success, making it to No. 26 on the Billboard 200 and No. 17 on the Top R&B/Hip-Hop Albums. Two singles were released: "Party All the Time", which made it to No. 2 on the Billboard Hot 100 and the title track, which became a minor R&B hit. This studio album was recorded as part of fulfilling a $100,000 bet that Richard Pryor had made with Eddie Murphy that he could not sing. In the album's liner notes, Eddie Murphy wrote the following "To Richard Pryor, my idol, with whom I have a $100,000 bet. No, motherfucker, I didn't forget."

In an interview in 1987, Murphy said: "My album could have been much better but it came out okay".

== Background ==
For this album, Murphy enlisted other well-known musicians to help him create his first musical studio album. The record has two Stevie Wonder produced and written tracks, "Do I" and "Everything's Coming Up Roses". There are also two songs that Rick James produced and wrote—the title track (a minor R&B hit) and the successful hit, "Party All the Time".

Murphy wrote three tracks on the album in which he also gets sole writing credit for: "C-O-N Confused", a disco track, "I, Me, Us, We", a Parliament homage, and "My God Is Color Blind", an anti-racism song. Murphy took an experimental approach to test himself in what he could do with music.

== Track listing ==
No.	Title	Writer(s)	Producer(s)	Length
1.	"Do I"	Stevie Wonder	Aquil Fudge	3:56
2.	"C-O-N Confused"	Murphy	Fudge	3:41
3.	"How Could It Be" (featuring Crystal Blake)	Frank "Rusty" Hamilton III	Fudge	4:39
4.	"I Wish (I Could Tell You When)"	Murphy (words); David Allen Jones (music)	Fudge; Jones (assoc.)	4:28
5.	"Party All the Time" (featuring Rick James)	Rick James	James	4:12
6.	"I, Me, Us, We"	Murphy	Fudge; Mike McKinney (assoc.)	4:41
7.	"My God Is Color Blind"	Murphy	Fudge	4:42
8.	"Everything's Coming Up Roses"	Wonder	Wonder	4:34

== Personnel ==
Musicians

- Eddie Murphy – lead vocals, background vocals (1, 3, 4, 7), arrangements (7), vocal arrangements (2), piano and synthesizers (7)
- James Allen – drums (8), drum programming (1, 3, 7), Simmons drums (3)
- Gordon Banks – guitar (7)
- Roderick Bascom – background vocals (6)
- Crystal Blake – lead vocals (3), background vocals (3, 8)
- Letitia Body – background vocals (8)
- Bob Bralove – synthesizer programming (8)
- Ben Bridges – guitar (6)
- Alvin Broussard Jr. – background vocals (6)
- Brad Buxer – gunshot sound effect (7)
- Anthony Clark – background vocals (6)
- Carlotta Clark – background vocals (6)
- Lisa Clark – background vocals (6)
- Dennis Davis – drums (2, 6)
- Billy Durham – background vocals (8)
- Dana Essex – background vocals (8)
- Ernie Fields – string contractor (2, 3, 7)
- Paul Freudenberg – background vocals (6)
- Aquil Fudge – arrangements (2, 4), tambourine (6)
- Earl Gardner – horns (6)
- Larry Gittens – Flugelhorn (3), background vocals (6)
- Roddrick Gordon – background vocals (6)
- Cynthia Green – background vocals (6)
- Frank "Rusty" Hamilton III – arrangements, bass, keyboards, and synthesizers (3)
- Bruce Hawes – background vocals (6)
- Kenny Hawkins – guitar (5)
- Finis Henderson – background vocals (2)
- Rick James – lead and background vocals, arrangements, percussion, and drums (5)
- Keith John – background vocals (2, 8)
- David Allen Jones – background vocals (6)
- Jacque M. Kimbrough – background vocals (6)
- Derrick Lawrence – background vocals (6)
- Greg Levis – keyboard (5)
- Jeff Lorber – keyboards (2, 4), synthesizer (2), drum programming and sequencing (4)
- Bob Malach – horns (6)
- Lorelei McBroom – background vocals (6)
- Melody McCully – background vocals (8)
- Mike McKinney – acoustic bass (4), drum programming and bass (6)
- Larry Menally – acoustic guitar (3)
- Roger Nichols – Wendell II drum computer programming (2–4, 6)
- Michael O'Neil – guitar (6)
- LaMorris Payne – background vocals (5)
- Philip Perry – background vocals (8)
- Paul Pesco – guitar (4)
- Greg Phillinganes – keyboards and synthesizers (1)
- Darryl Phinnessee – background vocals (1, 2, 4, 8)
- Greg Poree – string arrangements (2, 3, 7), acoustic guitar (3)
- Keith Quinn – horns (6)
- Spartacus R. – background vocals (6)
- William Rivera – background vocals (6)
- Dwayne Roberson – background vocals (6)
- Darryl Ross – Fender Rhodes (3), background vocals (6)
- Levi Ruffin – keyboard and background vocals (5)
- Howard Smith – background vocals (1)
- Abdoulaye Soumare – synthesizer programming (1)
- Pam Vincent – background vocals (8)
- Freddie Washington – bass (2, 6)
- Michelle Wiley – background vocals (6)
- David Williams – guitar (1)
- Philip Williams – background vocals (1, 6)
- Joyce Wilson-Vincent – background vocals (8)
- Bill Wolfer – synthesizer (6)
- Stevie Wonder – arrangements (8), rhythm arrangements (1), keyboards (1, 8), drum programming (8), harmonica (4)
- Billy Young – keyboards and synthesizer (6)

Technical and artistic personnel

- Larkin Arnold – executive producer
- Alvin Broussard Jr. – engineer (1)
- Tom Flye – engineer and mixing (5)
- Jim "Dr. Jam" Gallagher – engineer (2, 3, 6)
- Nancy Greenberg – art direction
- Bob Harlan – engineer and mixing (1–4, 6–8)
- Daniel Harlan – engineer (2)
- Rick James – mixing (5)
- David Lazerus – engineer (3, 4, 6, 8)
- Annie Leibovitz – photography
- Stephen Marcussen – mastering
- Jerry Solomon – additional engineering (3)

== Charts ==
Chart (1985–86)	Peak position
U.S. Billboard Top Current Albums	26
U.S. Billboard 200	26
U.S. Billboard Top R&B/Hip-Hop Albums	17
U.S. Cash Box Top 200 Pop Albums	25
U.S. Cash Box Top 75 Black Contemporary Albums	23

== Certifications ==
Region	Certification	Certified units/sales
United States (RIAA)	Gold	500,000^{^}
^{^} Shipments figures based on certification alone.
