= Love's Alright =

1993 studio album by Eddie Murphy

Studio album by Eddie Murphy
- Released: February 23, 1993
- Recorded: 1992
- Length: 53:15
- Label: Motown
- Producer: Eddie Murphy, David Allen Jones, Ralph Hawkins, Trenten Gumbs

Eddie Murphy chronology
So Happy (1989)	Love's Alright (1993)	Greatest Comedy Hits (1997)

Professional ratings
Review scores
Source	Rating
AllMusic	2/5 stars
Robert Christgau	(dud)

Love's Alright is the third musical studio album by comedian and singer Eddie Murphy. The album was released on February 23, 1993, by Motown Records, and was produced by Murphy, David Allen Jones and Ralph Hawkins. It was a critical and commercial failure, only making it to number 80 on the Top R&B/Hip-Hop Albums chart. Two singles were released: "Whatzupwitu", whose music video is patterned after the album cover and features Michael Jackson, and "I Was a King", featuring Shabba Ranks.

== Track listing ==
No.	Title	Lyrics	Music	Producer(s)	Length
1.	"Yeah"	Eddie Murphy (concept)	David Allen Jones; Trenten Gumbs	Murphy; Jones; Gumbs	4:44
2.	"I Was a King" (featuring Shabba Ranks)	Murphy; Rexton Gordon (rap); Clifton Dillon (rap); Errol Dillon (rap)	Murphy; Gumbs; Jones	Murphy; Jones; Gumbs	4:30
3.	"Love's Alright"	Murphy	Murphy; Jones; Gumbs	Murphy; Jones; Gumbs	4:04
4.	"Desdamona"	Murphy	Murphy; Ralph Hawkins Jr.	Murphy; Hawkins Jr.	4:44
5.	"Cuteness"	Murphy	Murphy; Jones; Gumbs	Murphy; Jones; Gumbs	5:52
6.	"Whatzupwitu" (featuring Michael Jackson)	Murphy	Murphy; Gumbs	Murphy; Gumbs	3:21
7.	"Always Is Love"	Murphy	Murphy; Gumbs	Murphy; Gumbs; Jones	3:53
8.	"Don't Give Up on Love"	Murphy; Jones; Hawkins Jr.	Jones; Hawkins Jr.	Jones; Hawkins Jr.; Murphy (co.)	4:16
9.	"One"	Murphy	Murphy; Gumbs	Murphy; Jones; Gumbs	4:10
10.	"Flower Child"	Murphy	Murphy; Jones	Murphy; Jones; Gumbs	3:53
11.	"Good Day Sunshine"	Paul McCartney; John Lennon	McCartney; Lennon	Murphy; Gumbs; Jones	2:04
12.	"Hey Joe"	William Roberts	Roberts	Murphy; Gumbs; Jones	7:44

== Personnel ==
Musicians

- Eddie Murphy – lead vocals, background vocals (1–4, 7, 9–12), keyboards (2–4, 6, 7, 9, 10), drum programming (6, 7, 9, 10), congas (2), talk track (11)
- Babyface – guest vocals (1)
- Sandi Barber – background vocals (1, 6, 7, 12)
- Sophia Bender – background vocals (6)
- Jon Bon Jovi – guest vocals (1)
- Boys Choir of Harlem – background vocals (6)
- Garth Brooks – guest vocals (1)
- Fritz Cadet – guitar (7)
- Tim Christian – live drums (3, 12)
- Stanley Clarke – bass guitar (1)
- Tim "Timbali" Cornwell – percussion (5)
- En Vogue – guest vocals (1)
- Johnny Gill – guest vocals (1)
- Paul A. Goodwyn – live drums (11)
- Larry Graham – bass guitar (2–4, 7, 9, 11, 12)
- Amy Grant – guest vocals (1)
- Onaje A. Gumbs – keyboards (7)
- Trenten Gumbs – keyboards (2, 6, 7, 9), drum programming (1, 3, 6, 7), congas (2), talk track (11)
- Gwen Guthrie – background vocals (8)
- Hammer – guest vocals (1)
- Heavy D – guest vocals (1)
- Herbie Hancock – piano (1)
- Ralph Hawkins Jr. – keyboards (4–6, 8, 9), drum programming (4, 5, 8, 9), background vocals (4, 5, 8)
- Howard Hewett – guest vocals (1)
- Horns of Fire – horns (4, 5)
- Julio Iglesias – guest vocals (1)
- Ernie Isley – guitar (3, 12)
- Janet Jackson – guest vocals (1)
- Michael Jackson – guest vocals (1, 6)
- Stephanie James – background vocals (8)
- Elton John – guest vocals (1)
- George Johnson – guitar (2)
- David Allen Jones – keyboards (2, 3, 10), drum programming (1, 3, 8–10), background vocals (2)
- B.B. King – guitar (4)
- Patti LaBelle – guest vocals (1)
- Dan Levine – background vocals and horn arrangements – horns (4)
- Emmanuel Lewis – guest vocals (1)
- James Lloyd – keyboards (11)
- Bob Magnuson – horns (4)
- James Manning – bass guitar (5)
- Paul McCartney – guest vocals (1)
- Cindy Mizelle – background vocals (4)
- David News – guitar (5)
- Teddy Pendergrass – guest vocals (1)
- Herman Riley – horns (4)
- Keith Robinson – acoustic guitar (8)
- Greg Ruvolo – horns (4)
- Richie Sambora – guest vocals (1)
- Clint Smith – talk track (11)
- Maurice Spears – horns (4)
- Carol Sylvan – background vocals (12)
- Tom Tom MMLXXXIV – horn arrangements (4, 5), string arrangements (4)
- Luther Vandross – guest vocals (1)
- Audrey Wheeler – background vocals (1, 4, 6, 7, 9)
- Barry White – guest vocals (1)
- Brenda White-King – background vocals (8)
- Stevie Wonder – guest vocals (1), harmonica (1)

Technical personnel

- Nadine Baker – production coordinator
- Keith Evans – engineer (1–10, 12)
- Jon Gass – mixing (3, 4, 6, 7, 9, 10, 12)
- Andre Jackson – engineer (1–7, 9–12), mixing (9, 11)
- Kim James – assistant engineer (2, 5, 6)
- Danny Leake – mixing (5, 8)
- Kaz Masumoto – engineer (4)
- Dave "Hard Drive" Pensado – mixing (2)
- Barney Perkins – mixing (1)
- Jeff Poe – engineer (12)
- Carmen Rizzo – mixing (3, 8, 9)
- Donna Ross-Jones – executive producer
- Eddy Schreyer – mastering
- Eric Stark – engineer (2, 3, 6, 8–10)
- Ralph Sutton – engineer (1)
