= Whatzupwitu =

Single by Eddie Murphy featuring Michael Jackson

from the album Love's Alright
- B-side: "I Was a King"
- Released: March 30, 1993
- Recorded: January 1992
- Genre: R&B; soul; dance-pop; new jack swing
- Length: 3:21
- Label: Motown
- Songwriters: Eddie Murphy; Trenten Gumbs
- Producers: Eddie Murphy; Trenten Gumbs

Eddie Murphy singles chronology
"I Was a King" (1993)	"Whatzupwitu" (1993)	"Desdemona" (1993)

Michael Jackson singles chronology
"Give In to Me" (1993)	"Whatzupwitu" (1993)	"Will You Be There" (1993)

"Whatzupwitu" (pronounced "what's up with you") is a 1993 R&B song by Eddie Murphy, featuring Michael Jackson. It is included as the sixth track on Murphy's third studio album Love's Alright. The song was written and produced by Murphy and Trenten Gumbs. It was released as the album's second single on March 30, 1993 by Motown Records. Jackson decided to participate in the song and video since he thought the lyrics had a positive message.

== Critical reception ==
AllMusic editor Steven McDonald wrote that despite being a featured artist, Jackson "steals 'Whatzupwitu' outright."

== Music video ==
"Whatzupwitu" has been noted for its music video, directed by Wayne Isham with production work by Klasky Csupo, which was inspired by the album's cover art and also uses computer graphics. This followed Murphy's guest appearance in Jackson's music video for "Remember the Time". It was voted by MTV viewers in 1999 as the third worst music video of all time, and permanently retired on the channel from being aired in its entirety on the MTV special 25 Lame. The beginning of the video features Murphy looking through a puddle of water. In the puddle, there is a sad clown that says, "The elephant is dying." Then, there is an animated scene of three elephants standing on top of a sea turtle while holding the Earth on their backs. The scene changes to Murphy singing over various special effects over a blue sky, before Jackson appears and begins to sing along with him. The music video also features the Harlem Boys Choir singing and dancing around them.

== Track listings ==
CD maxi single (Netherlands)

1. "Whatzupwitu" (album version) – 3:21
2. "Whatzupwitu" (instrumental version) – 3:21
3. "I Was a King" (radio edit) – 4:05

12" promo (US)

- A1. "Whatzupwitu" (Klub mix full) – 7:21
- A2. "Whatzupwitu" (Klub mix edit) – 3:52
- A3. "Whatzupwitu" (Hip hop remix) – 4:47
- B1. "Whatzupwitu" (Eclipse mix) – 6:30
- B2. "Whatzupwitu" (LP version) – 3:21
- B3. "Whatzupwitu" (Klub mix dub) – 6:34

12" single (US)

- A. "Whatzupwitu" (Klub Full mix) – 7:12
- B1. "Whatzupwitu" (Klub mix edit) – 3:52
- B2. "Whatzupwitu" (Hip hop remix edit) – 3:47

CD promo (US)

1. "Whatzupwitu" (Klub mix edit) – 3:52
2. "Whatzupwitu" (Hip hop remix edit) – 3:47
3. "Whatzupwitu" (Klub mix full) – 7:21
4. "Whatzupwitu" (Eclipse mix) – 6:30
5. "Whatzupwitu" (Hip hop remix) – 4:47
6. "Whatzupwitu" (LP version) – 3:21

CD single (France)

1. "Whatzupwitu" – 3:21
2. "Whatzupwitu" (instrumental) – 3:19

== Charts ==
Chart performance for "Whatzupwitu"
Chart (1993)	Peak position
Australia (ARIA)	88
France (SNEP)	36
Netherlands (Single Top 100)	50
US Hot R&B/Hip-Hop Songs (Billboard)	74
