= Eddie Murphy =

American comedian, actor, and singer (born 1961)

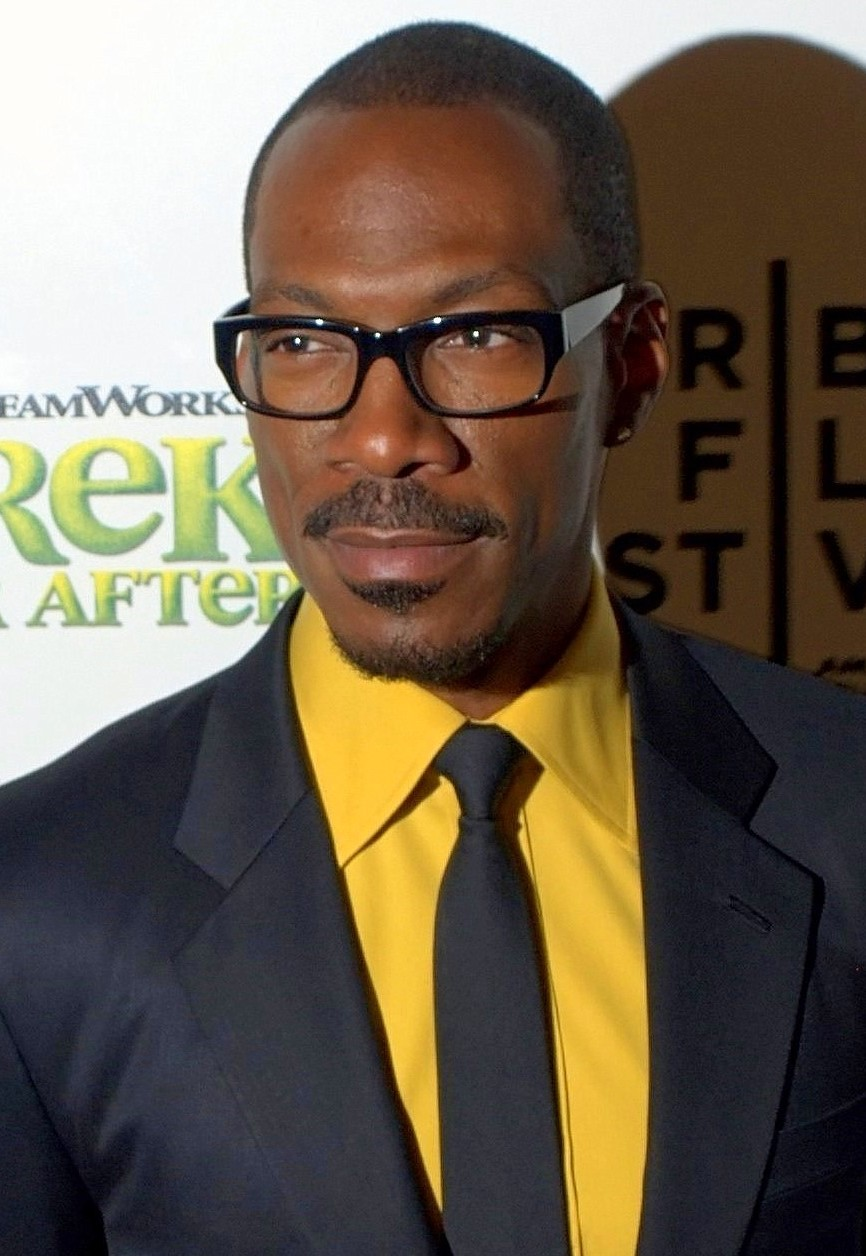
- Murphy in 2010
- Born: Edward Regan Murphy; April 3, 1961 (age 65); New York City, U.S.
- Spouse(s): Nicole Mitchell (m. 1993; div. 2006) Paige Butcher (m. 2024)
- Partners: Mel B (2006); Tracey Edmonds (2008)
- Children: 10
- Relatives: Charlie Murphy (brother)

Comedy career
- Years active: 1976–present
- Medium: Stand-up; film; television; music
- Genres: Observational comedy; musical comedy; blue comedy; black comedy; insult comedy; sketch comedy; racial humor; satire
- Subjects: African-American culture; race relations; racism; marriage; sex; everyday life; pop culture
- Musical career
- Genres: R&B; funk; synth-pop; comedy
- Instruments: Vocals
- Labels: Sony BMG; CBS; Columbia; Motown

Edward Regan Murphy (born April 3, 1961) is an American comedian, actor, and singer. He is widely recognized as one of the most influential African-American artists in the entertainment industry, and one of the greatest stand-up comedians of all time. He had his breakthrough as a stand-up comic before gaining stardom for his film roles; He has received several accolades including a Golden Globe Award, a Grammy Award, and an Emmy Award as well as nominations for an Academy Award and a BAFTA Award. He was honored with the Mark Twain Prize for American Humor in 2015, the Cecil B. DeMille Award in 2023, and the 51st AFI Life Achievement Award in 2026.

Murphy shot to fame on the sketch comedy show Saturday Night Live, for which he was a regular cast member from 1980 to 1984 and broke out as a movie star in the 1980s films 48 Hrs. (1982), Trading Places (1983), and Beverly Hills Cop (1984). He then established himself as a leading man with starring roles in The Golden Child (1986), Coming to America (1988), Harlem Nights (which he also directed) (1989), Boomerang (1992), The Nutty Professor (1996), Dr. Dolittle (1998), Bowfinger (1999), Daddy Day Care (2003), and Norbit (2007). Murphy both won the Golden Globe for Best Supporting Actor and received a nomination for the Academy Award for Best Supporting Actor for his role in Dreamgirls (2006).

Murphy has worked as a voice actor, including Mushu in Disney's Mulan (1998), Thurgood Stubbs in the sitcom The PJs (1999–2001), and Donkey in the Shrek franchise (2001–present), the latter of which earned him a BAFTA Award for Best Actor in a Supporting Role nomination. Murphy often takes on multiple roles in a single film, such as in Coming to America, Vampire in Brooklyn, the Nutty Professor films, Bowfinger, The Adventures of Pluto Nash and Norbit. This is intended as Murphy's tribute to one of his idols, Peter Sellers. Following a string of poorly received films, he had a career resurgence with leading roles in films such as Dolemite Is My Name (2019), Coming 2 America (2021), You People, Candy Cane Lane (both 2023) and Beverly Hills Cop: Axel F (2024).

In 2020, he won his first Primetime Emmy Award for Outstanding Guest Actor in a Comedy Series for hosting Saturday Night Live. Murphy's films have grossed over $3.8 billion ($6.5 billion adjusted for inflation) in the United States and Canada box office, and over $6.7 billion worldwide. In 2015, his films made him the sixth-highest grossing actor in the United States. As a singer, Murphy has released three studio albums, including How Could It Be (1985), So Happy (1989), and Love's Alright (1993). He is also known for his 1985 single "Party All the Time", which peaked at number two on the Billboard Hot 100.

== Early life ==
Edward Regan Murphy was born on April 3, 1961, in Brooklyn, a borough of New York City, and raised in the borough's Bushwick neighborhood. His mother, Lillian Murphy (née Laney, later Murphy Lynch), was a telephone operator, and his father, Charles Edward Murphy (1940–1969), was a transit police officer and an amateur actor and comedian.

His father was murdered in 1969. Murphy later stated:

My mother and father broke up when I was three and he died when I was eight, so I have very dim memories. ... He was a victim of the Murphy charm (laughs). A woman stabbed my father. I never got all the logistics. It was supposed to be one of those crimes of passion: "If I can't have you, no one else will" kind of deal.

When Murphy's single mother became ill, eight-year-old Murphy and his elder brother Charlie (1959–2017) lived in foster care for one year. In interviews, Murphy has said his time in foster care was influential in developing his sense of humor. Later, he and his brother were raised in Roosevelt, New York, by his mother and stepfather Vernon Lynch, a foreman at an ice cream plant.

== Career ==
=== 1976–1980: Early standup career ===
When Murphy was fifteen, he listened to Richard Pryor's comedy album That Nigger's Crazy, which inspired his decision to become a comedian. As a child, Murphy developed playing multiple characters in imitation of his acting hero, Peter Sellers. Other early influences included Bill Cosby, Redd Foxx, Robin Williams, Muhammad Ali, Bruce Lee, and Charlie Chaplin.

On July 9, 1976, the date with which Murphy marks the beginning of his career, he performed in a talent show at the Roosevelt Youth Center, doing an impersonation of singer Al Green as Green's song "Let's Stay Together" played. This led to work at other clubs within walking distance, and then late-night jobs at locations that required him to commute by train. To do this, he secretly skipped school, and after his mother discovered this at the end of his senior year, he was required to attend summer school.

=== 1980s: Superstar status and career peak ===
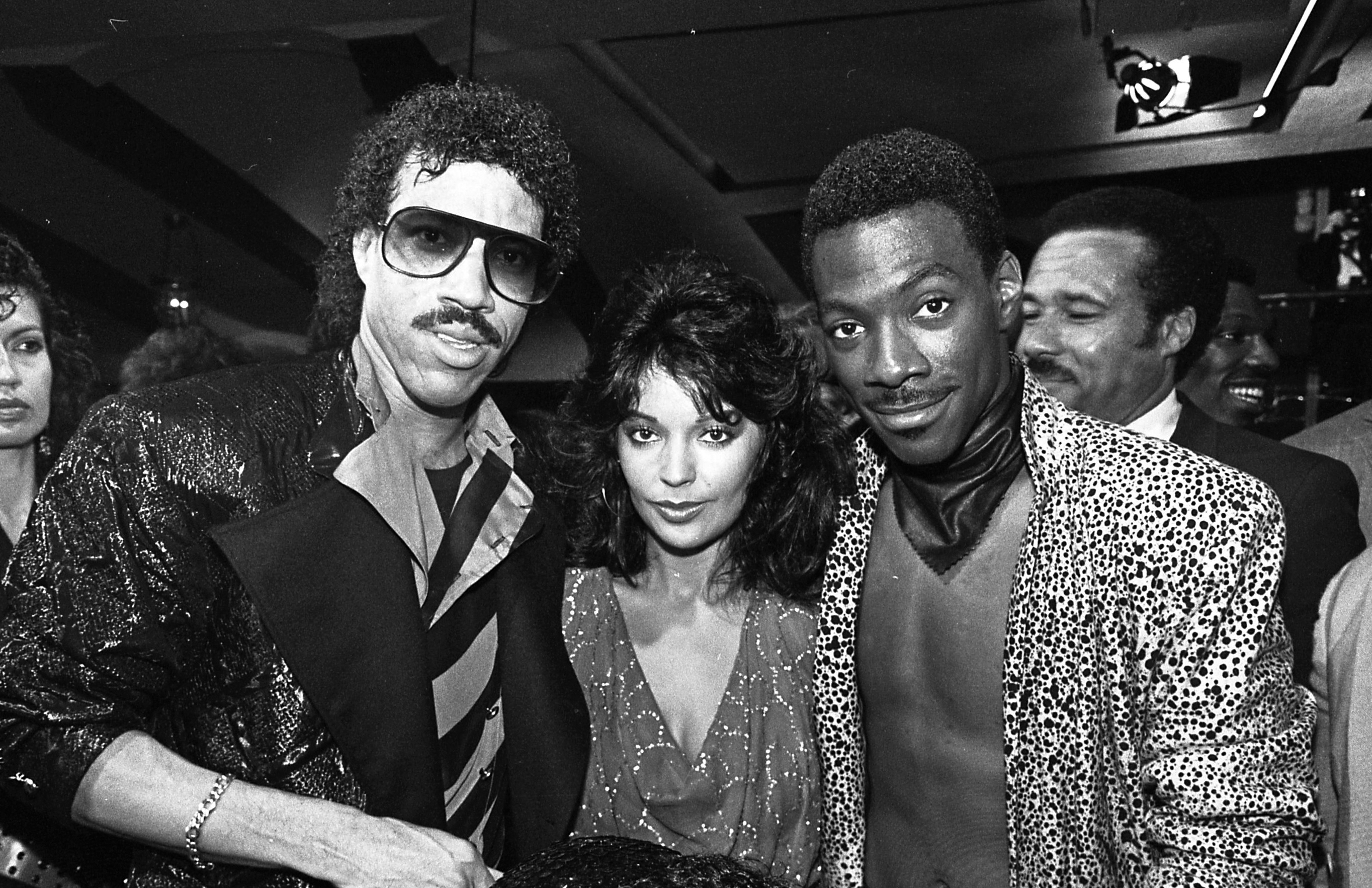
Lionel Richie, Apollonia Kotero and Murphy at the Purple Rain premiere in 1984

In the early 1980s, Murphy first earned national attention as a cast member on Saturday Night Live (SNL) and was credited with helping to revitalize the show. His characters included a grown-up version of the Little Rascals character Buckwheat; a streetwise children's show host named Mr. Robinson (parodying Fred Rogers, who found it amusing); and a morose, cynical Gumby, whose trademark slogan became an SNL catchphrase: "I'm Gumby, dammit!" According to Joseph Clokey, whose father Art Clokey created Gumby, both of them "thought Eddie was a genius in the way he played that character". Eddie Murphy's impersonation revived public interest in Gumby. The Buckwheat character was retired in spectacular fashion—assassinated, on camera, in front of 30 Rockefeller Plaza—at Murphy's request, after he grew tired of constant demands from fans to "Do Buckwheat! Do Buckwheat!" In Rolling Stone's February 2015 appraisal of all 141 SNL cast members to-date, Murphy was ranked second (behind John Belushi). "It is customary (and accurate) to say that Eddie Murphy is the only reason SNL survived the five-year wilderness without Lorne Michaels", the magazine noted. Murphy's early comedy was characterized by copious profanity and sketches lampooning diverse groups of people, including WASPs, African Americans, Italian Americans, overweight people, and gay people. He released two stand-up specials. Delirious was filmed in 1983 in Washington, D.C.

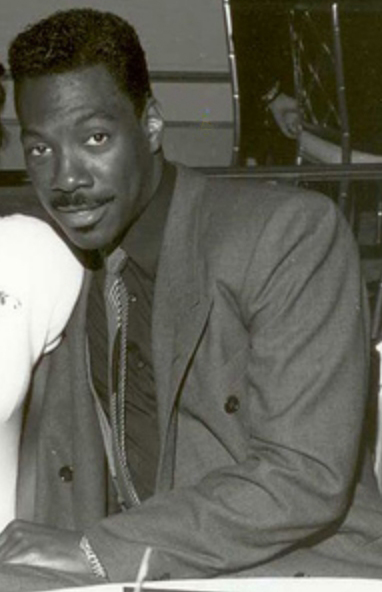
Murphy in 1988

Due to the popularity of Delirious, his concert film, Eddie Murphy Raw (1987), received a wide theatrical release, grossing $50 million; the movie was filmed in the Felt Forum at Madison Square Garden in New York City. In 1982, Murphy made his big-screen debut in the film 48 Hrs. with Nick Nolte. 48 Hrs. proved to be a hit when it was released during the Christmas season of 1982. Nolte was scheduled to host the December 11, 1982, Christmas episode of Saturday Night Live, but became too ill to host, so Murphy took over. He became the only cast member to host while still a regular. Murphy opened the show with the phrase, "Live from New York, it's the Eddie Murphy Show!" The following year, Murphy starred in Trading Places with SNL original cast member Dan Aykroyd. The movie marked the first of Murphy's collaborations with director John Landis, who would go on to direct Murphy in Coming to America (1988) and Beverly Hills Cop III (1994). Trading Places was an even greater box-office success than 48 Hrs.

Murphy appeared in Best Defense (1984), co-starring Dudley Moore. Credited as a "Strategic Guest Star", Murphy was added to the film after an original version was completed but tested poorly with audiences. Best Defense was a major financial and critical disappointment. When he hosted SNL, Murphy joined the chorus of those bashing Best Defense, calling it "the worst movie in the history of everything". The same year, he won a Grammy Award for Best Comedy Recording for his album Eddie Murphy: Comedian. (Murphy has been nominated for a total of three Grammy Awards.) Murphy starred in the successful action comedy film Beverly Hills Cop (1984). The film was Murphy's first solo leading role. Beverly Hills Cop grossed over $230 million at the U.S. box office, becoming the highest-grossing film released in 1984, the highest-grossing comedy of all time, and the highest-grossing R-rated film of all time; as of May 2018, it was 46th in the list of all-time U.S. box-office grossers after adjusting for inflation (third-highest amongst R-rated films). Murphy chose to do that film instead of Ghostbusters (1984). Murphy was offered a part in Star Trek IV: The Voyage Home (1986), a role that, after being heavily rewritten from one of comic relief to one of love interest, went to Catherine Hicks. By this time, Murphy's near-exclusive contract with Paramount Pictures rivaled Star Trek as Paramount's most lucrative franchise.

By 1986, he launched Eddie Murphy Television Enterprises with a deal at Paramount Television. In his next subsequent role, he starred in the supernatural comedy The Golden Child (1986). Although The Golden Child performed well at the box office, the movie was not as well received as 48 Hrs., Trading Places, and Beverly Hills Cop. The Golden Child was considered a change of pace for Murphy because of the supernatural setting instead of the "street smart" settings of his previous efforts. Not long afterward, he reprised his role of Axel Foley in the Tony Scott–directed Beverly Hills Cop II (1987). It was a box-office success, grossing almost $300 million worldwide.

At a press conference to promote Beverly Hills Cop II, Murphy announced the existence of the Black Pack, a creative alliance between a group of Black male comedians/actors/writers/directors that included himself, Arsenio Hall, Paul Mooney, Robert Townsend, and Keenen Ivory Wayans.

By the end of the decade, Murphy was Hollywood's biggest box-office star. At that time, Murphy was offered the lead role in Who Framed Roger Rabbit (1988), but he turned it down and later came to regret that decision, explaining: "[It] sounded ridiculous to me, and I passed on it. And afterwards, I was like, 'Oh, that's fucking amazing.'" In 1988, Murphy and his Eddie Murphy Television Enterprises company had struck a deal with CBS. Murphy also turned down the lead role in Driving Miss Daisy, (1989) explaining: "They actually developed that for me... I wasn't doing no shit like that back then. I was like 'I ain't driving no Miss Daisy.'"

=== 1990–1998: Commercial decline and rebound ===
From 1989 onward, critical praise for Murphy's films declined; it hit a low point with the critically panned Beverly Hills Cop III (1994), a movie that Murphy denounced during an appearance on Inside the Actors Studio. While his general box-office receipts declined, he achieved notable commercial success with Another 48 Hrs. (1990) and Boomerang (1992). During this period, Murphy also starred in The Distinguished Gentleman (1992), a political comedy (Murphy starred in the film as Paramount, who had a deal with Murphy, loaned out Murphy to The Walt Disney Studios to make the film), and Vampire in Brooklyn (1995), a horror-comedy directed by Wes Craven. Though Vampire in Brooklyn was met with negative reviews upon release, it has since gained a cult following. On Harlem Nights (1989), Murphy worked as director, producer and star, as well as sharing co-writer duties with his brother, Charlie Murphy. The film featured Murphy's comic idols Richard Pryor and Redd Foxx in supporting roles.

During this period, Murphy was criticized by filmmaker Spike Lee for not using his status to help Black actors break into film. However, as Murphy's prominence increased, his films (especially those he produced) often had a mainly Black cast (examples include Coming to America, Harlem Nights, Boomerang, Vampire in Brooklyn and Life). Many Black actors who later received greater recognition made early appearances in Murphy's films, such as Damon Wayans in Beverly Hills Cop, Halle Berry and Martin Lawrence in Boomerang, Samuel L. Jackson and Cuba Gooding Jr. in Coming to America, Dave Chappelle in The Nutty Professor, and Chris Rock in Beverly Hills Cop II. Naming The Nutty Professor as his favorite comedy, Rock regards Murphy's performance in the film as being so great, he had "been robbed of an Oscar", adding that his various performances were "Peter Sellers–esque".

Although Murphy owes his initial breakout success to Saturday Night Live, he did not participate in the making of the Live from New York: An Uncensored History of Saturday Night Live retrospective book by Tom Shales and James Andrew Miller (2002), nor did he ever attend cast reunions or anniversary specials until his appearance on the SNL 40th anniversary special. Murphy told Rolling Stone he had distanced himself from the show because he was angry with David Spade over the latter's joke about Murphy's career during a segment on SNL; he was also angry with Lorne Michaels and the production staff for allowing the joke in the first place. Murphy and Spade have since reconciled.

=== 1998–2018: Family-friendly films, flops and Dreamgirls ===
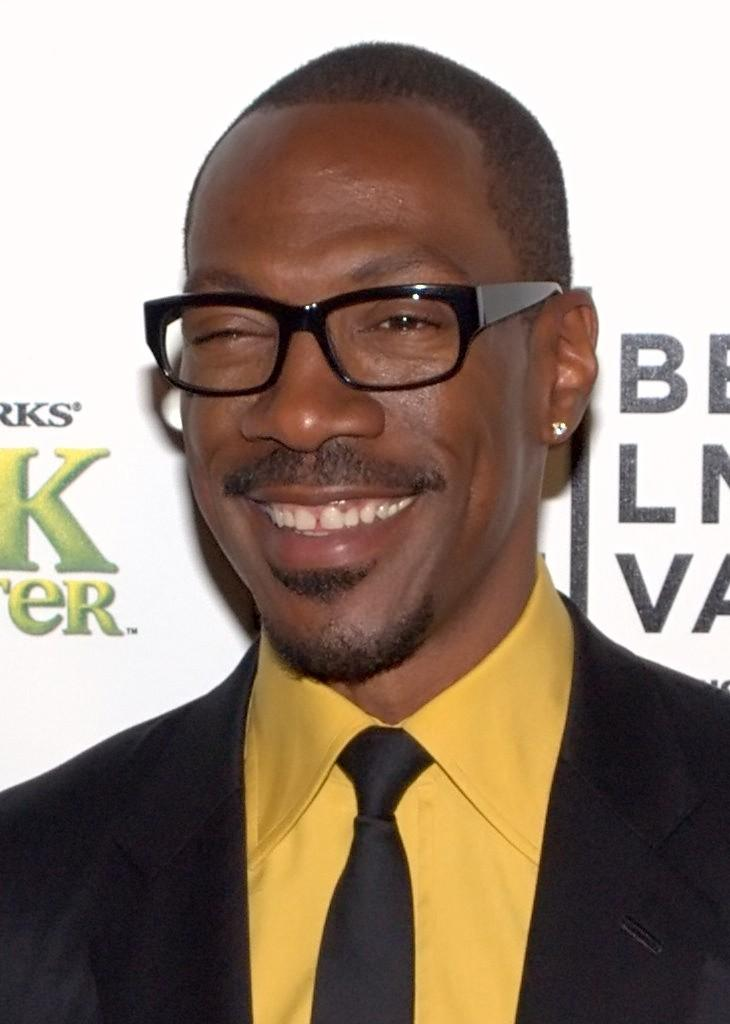
Murphy at the premiere of Shrek Forever After at the Tribeca Film Festival in 2010

Murphy followed The Nutty Professor with a series of successful family-friendly movies like Mulan (1998), Dr. Dolittle (also 1998) and its 2001 sequel, the Shrek series, Daddy Day Care (2003), and The Haunted Mansion (also 2003), along with Nutty Professor II: The Klumps (2000). However, most of his movies meant for more adult audiences performed moderately; Metro (1997), I Spy (2002), and Showtime (2002) all grossed less than $40 million domestically, Holy Man (1998) performed poorly, grossing less than $13 million, and The Adventures of Pluto Nash (2002) is on record as one of the biggest financial failures all time, grossing just $7 million worldwide on a reported massive $110 million budget. An exception to this run of poorly received adult-themed films was the Frank Oz comedy Bowfinger (1999), also starring Steve Martin. The film garnered generally positive critical reviews and grossed $98 million at the box-office.

Murphy starred in the motion picture version of the Broadway musical Dreamgirls (2006) as soul singer James "Thunder" Early. Murphy won a Golden Globe for Best Supporting Actor, as well as a Screen Actors Guild Award and a Broadcast Film Critics Association Award in that category. Several reviews for the film highlighted Murphy's performance while he received some pre-release Academy Awards buzz. Murphy was nominated for the Academy Award for Best Supporting Actor on January 23, 2007, but lost to Alan Arkin for his performance in Little Miss Sunshine—it was speculated that one of the reasons Murphy lost out on winning the Academy Award was the negative reviews of his subsequent film Norbit, released in early February 2007. Murphy notoriously exited the 79th Academy Awards as soon as Arkin was announced the winner. In 2007, Murphy was invited to join the Academy of Motion Picture Arts and Sciences.

Murphy co-starred in Tower Heist (2011), directed by Brett Ratner, alongside Ben Stiller, Matthew Broderick, and Casey Affleck. Murphy played a thief who joins a group of hardworking men who find out they have fallen victim to a wealthy businessman's Ponzi scheme, and conspire to rob his high-rise residence. It was reported in 2011 that Murphy would host the 84th Academy Awards in 2012. However, he dropped out of his hosting duties on November 9, 2011, in the wake of the Brett Ratner scandal. On March 8, 2014, it was announced that Murphy would team up with Boomerang co-star Halle Berry in a new film titled Miles and Me. The film was also set to star Laurence Fishburne and was set to begin pre-production in 2014 from Paramount Pictures. No additional announcements were made regarding the project or any other attached personnel. On March 15, 2015, it was announced that Murphy would play comedian Richard Pryor's father, LeRoy Pryor, in the upcoming biopic directed by Lee Daniels with Mike Epps playing Pryor; as of 2019, the project remains in development hell.

In February 2015, Murphy attended the Saturday Night Live 40th Anniversary Special where Chris Rock introduced him in a special tribute dedicated to him. Murphy was greeted with an enthusiastic standing ovation from the crowd of comedians and stars, however he received criticism for his brief appearance, declining to tell any jokes, and for not reprising his iconic SNL characters. On October 15, 2015, Murphy was awarded the Mark Twain Prize for American Humor at the Kennedy Center in Washington, D.C. Those who honored Murphy at the event included Dave Chappelle, Chris Rock, Trevor Noah, George Lopez, Kevin Nealon, Kathy Griffin, Tracy Morgan, Joe Piscopo, Jay Pharoah and Dick Gregory. Murphy co-starred with actress Britt Robertson in the drama Mr. Church (2016) for which he received critical acclaim.

=== 2019–present: Career resurgence ===
In October 2019, Murphy produced and starred in Dolemite Is My Name as Rudy Ray Moore. The film was distributed on Netflix and received overwhelming critical acclaim. The film holds a 97% on Rotten Tomatoes with the critics consensus reading, "Eddie Murphy makes Dolemite Is My Name just as bold, brash, and ultimately hard to resist as its subject." For his work, Murphy received a Golden Globe Award nomination for the film.

In December 2019, Murphy returned to Saturday Night Live to promote Dolemite; this was his first time hosting since 1984. His hosting duties received overwhelming acclaim from audiences and critics alike, making it the highest watched episode since 2008 when Tina Fey played Sarah Palin. Comedians Dave Chappelle, Chris Rock, Tracy Morgan, and Kenan Thompson welcomed Murphy back in the opening monologue. Murphy went on to reprise his popular SNL characters such as Mr. Robinson, Gumby, Buckwheat, and Velvet Jones. Murphy won his first ever Primetime Emmy Award for Outstanding Guest Actor in a Comedy Series for hosting the episode. Murphy and most of the cast reprised their roles in the Coming to America sequel Coming 2 America, which was released in March 2021.

On December 6, 2013, it was announced that Murphy would star in the fourth film of the Beverly Hills Cop series. Brett Ratner was at the time set to direct the film, Jerry Bruckheimer was confirmed to produce the film, and Josh Appelbaum and Andre Nemec would write. In a June 2014 interview, Murphy discussed the plot of the film, saying it would take place and film in Detroit, bringing in an estimated $56.6 million to the state of Michigan. On June 14, 2016, it was confirmed that Murphy was still set to reprise his role as Axel Foley in a fourth film. In December 2019, it was reported that the film had moved to Netflix, where Beverly Hills Cop: Axel F, which was ultimately directed by Mark Molloy, was released on July 3, 2024.

In September 2021, Murphy and his Eddie Murphy Productions company signed a deal with Amazon Studios. On March 31, 2022, it was announced that Murphy will portray George Clinton in an untitled biopic, with John Davis and Catherine Davis producing through Davis Entertainment.

In June 2024, Murphy and Bruckheimer revealed that a fifth Beverly Hills Cop film was already in development. Murphy will reprise his role as Donkey in Shrek 5, set for release on June 30, 2027.

=== Singing career ===
Murphy is also a singer, having frequently provided background vocals to songs released by the Bus Boys; the song "(The Boys Are) Back in Town" was featured in 48 Hrs. and Murphy's comedy special Eddie Murphy Delirious. As a solo artist, Murphy had two hit singles, "Party All the Time" (produced by Rick James) and "Put Your Mouth on Me", during the latter half of the 1980s. He had started singing earlier in his career, with the songs "Boogie in Your Butt" and "Enough Is Enough", the latter being a parody of Barbra Streisand's and Donna Summer's 1979 song, "No More Tears". Both songs appeared on his 1982 self-titled comedy album. "Party All the Time" was featured on Murphy's debut album How Could It Be (1985), which included a minor follow-up R&B hit in the title track, a duet with vocalist Crystal Blake. This track was written by Rusty Hamilton and was produced by Stevie Wonder's cousin Aquil Fudge after a brief falling out with Rick James. In 2004, VH-1 and Blender voted "Party All the Time" number seven among the "50 Worst Songs of All-Time". Sharam used a sample of the song for the UK No. 8 hit "PATT (Party All the Time)" in 2006. "Put Your Mouth on Me" appeared on Murphy's 1989 follow-up album, So Happy.

Murphy recorded the album Love's Alright in the early 1990s. He performed in a music video of the single "Whatzupwitu", featuring Michael Jackson. He recorded a duet with Shabba Ranks called "I Was a King". In 1992, Murphy appeared in the music video for Michael Jackson's "Remember the Time" alongside Magic Johnson and Iman. Though uncredited, Murphy provided vocal work on SNL castmate Joe Piscopo's 1985 comedy single, "The Honeymooners Rap". Piscopo impersonated Jackie Gleason on the single, while Murphy provided an imitation of Art Carney. In Coming to America, he imitated Jackie Wilson when he sang "To Be Loved", but because the character he was playing had a thick accent, he had to sing it in character; he also performed in the same film as the character Randy Watson, a small time club singer, a role he reprised in the 2021 sequel Coming 2 America.

Murphy performed several songs in the Shrek film franchise. In the first film, he performed a version of the Monkees' "I'm a Believer" in the film's final scene; in Shrek 2, he performed Ricky Martin's hit "Livin' La Vida Loca", along with co-star Antonio Banderas; Murphy performed "Thank You (Falletin Me Be Mice Elf Again)" for Shrek the Third, once again with Banderas. In 2013, he released his first single in many years titled "Red Light", a reggae song featuring Snoop Dogg. He was also working on a new album titled 9, but it was never released.

== Influences ==
Murphy has cited as influences Richard Pryor, Elvis Presley, Muhammad Ali and Bruce Lee. Murphy was inspired by Pryor's taboo approach to comedy and did perfect impersonations of Presley, who he used as a model for what a star could be. Murphy was also inspired by Peter Sellers, whom he called his acting hero, for Sellers's ability to play multiple characters, an ability that helped develop Murphy's own skills. Despite also emulating Bill Cosby’s storytelling approach in his act, Cosby would criticize Murphy's use of profanity, with Murphy also holding more hostile feelings towards Cosby by the early 1980s. Comedians who cite Murphy as influencing them include Dave Chappelle, Chris Rock, Martin Lawrence, and Russell Brand.

== Personal life ==
=== Relationships and children ===
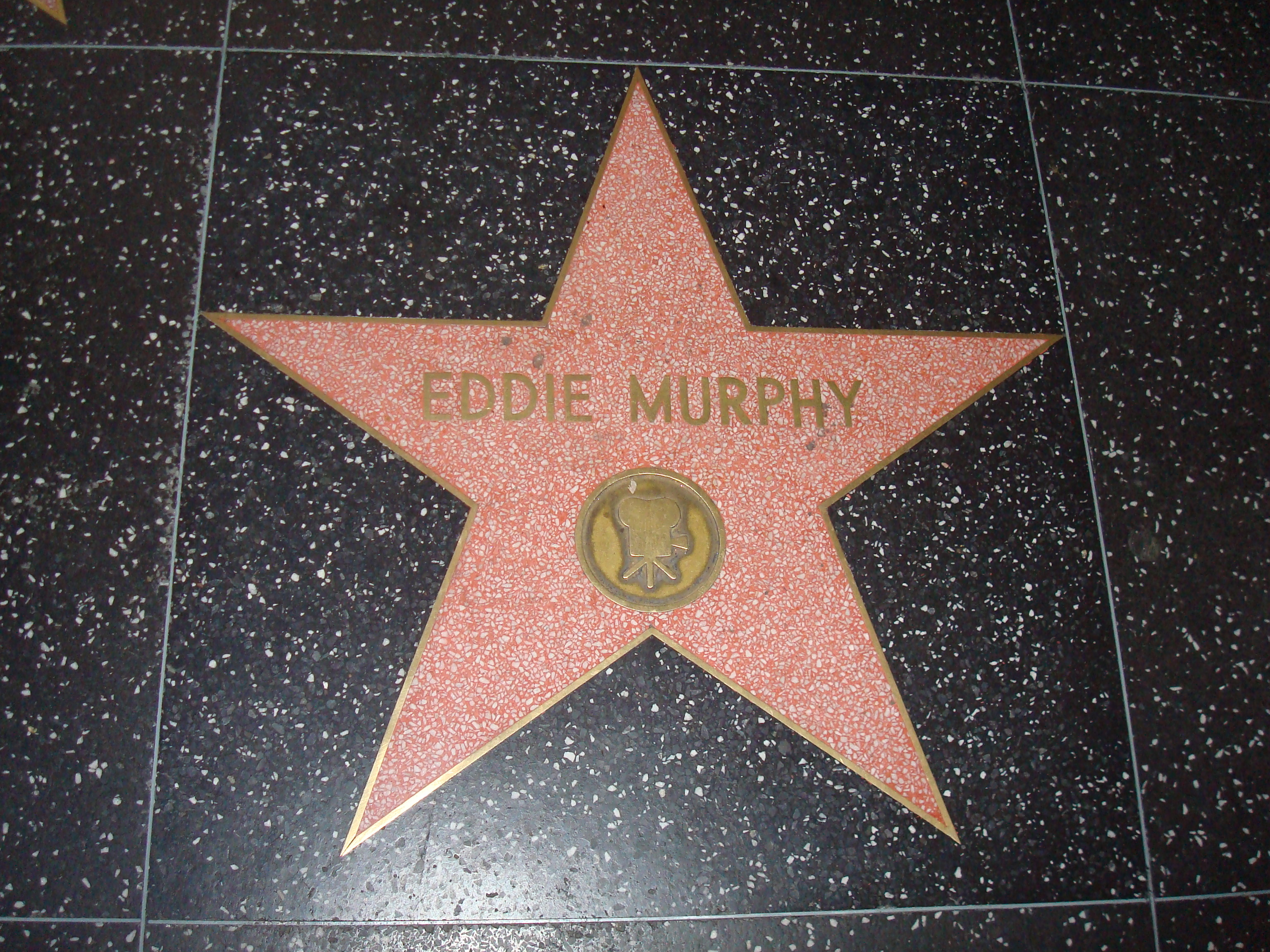
Murphy's star on the Hollywood Walk of Fame.

Murphy had two sons at the end of the 1980s: Eric (born July 10, 1989) with then-girlfriend Paulette McNeely; and Christian (born November 29, 1990), with then-girlfriend Tamara Hood.

Murphy began a longtime romantic relationship with Nicole Mitchell after meeting her in 1988 at an NAACP Image Awards show. They lived together for almost two years before getting married at the Abyssinian Baptist Church in New York City on March 18, 1993. Murphy and Mitchell have five children together: Bria (born November 18, 1989), Myles Mitchell (born November 7, 1992), Shayne Audra (born October 10, 1994), Zola Ivy (born December 24, 1999), and Bella Zahra (born January 29, 2002). In August 2005, Mitchell filed for divorce, citing "irreconcilable differences". The divorce was finalized on April 17, 2006.

Following his divorce from Mitchell, in 2006, Murphy began dating former Spice Girl Melanie Brown, who became pregnant and claimed the child was Murphy's. When questioned about the pregnancy in December 2006, by RTL Boulevard, Murphy told Dutch reporter Matthijs Kleyn, "I don't know whose child that is until it comes out and has a blood test. You shouldn't jump to conclusions, sir." Brown gave birth to Angel Iris Murphy Brown, on Murphy's 46th birthday, April 3, 2007. On June 22, 2007, representatives for Brown announced that a DNA test had confirmed Murphy was the child's father. Brown had stated in an interview that Murphy has not sought a relationship with Angel, although it was later reported in 2010 that Murphy was becoming a more involved father.

Murphy exchanged vows with film producer Tracey Edmonds, former wife of Kenneth "Babyface" Edmonds, on January 1, 2008, in a private ceremony on an island off Bora Bora. On January 16, 2008, the couple released a statement describing the ceremony as a symbolic union: "After much consideration and discussion, we have jointly decided that we will forgo having a legal ceremony as it is not necessary to define our relationship further" and that they would remain friends instead of pursuing a further romantic relationship. Murphy bought property on Long Island, New York, later that year.

On May 3, 2016, Murphy had a daughter Izzy Oona by Australian model Paige Butcher, whom he had been dating since 2012. Murphy and Butcher are also parents of a son, Max Charles, born on November 30, 2018. In September 2018 they became engaged to be married. Their son's middle name pays tribute to Murphy's late brother, Charlie, who died of leukemia in 2017. In July 2024, they married in a private ceremony in Anguilla.

In May 2025, Murphy's son Eric married Jasmine Lawrence, daughter of fellow entertainer Martin Lawrence.

=== Feud with Bill Cosby ===
Contrary to claims of Bill Cosby having a major influence on Murphy, it is acknowledged that Murphy has in fact long had a rivalry with Cosby. In a 2019 episode of Comedians in Cars Getting Coffee, Murphy revealed to Jerry Seinfeld that he began having an acrimonious relationship with Cosby after Cosby was highly negative towards him when the two met in 1981 and that his Cosby parodies which he began doing in the 1980s in fact reflected his real life dislike towards Cosby. Despite a few public appearances together in later time, and showing what was publicly suggested to be friendly terms while participating in a softball game in 1989, Murphy and Cosby were actually never able to resolve their differences. Their feud would become more publicly hinted in Murphy's 1987 stand-up film Eddie Murphy Raw, where Murphy suggested that Cosby, who was at the time doing commercials for Coca Cola, “have a Coke and a smile and shut the f— up.” It was also acknowledged that while meeting with Richard Pryor and Murphy at Loyola Marymount University in Los Angeles in 1989, Cosby appeared more interested in interacting with Pryor. Even shortly after publicly shaking hands with Cosby while attending the Sammy Davis Jr.'s 60th Anniversary Celebration TV special, which was televised in 1990, Murphy would again do another impression of Cosby as he was being filmed onstage, with Cosby's reaction being unrecorded. In 2019, Murphy re-ignited the feud while hosting Saturday Night Live during his opening monologue, stating "My kids are pretty much my whole life now, but if you would have told me 30 years ago that I would be this boring, stay-at-home house dad and Bill Cosby would be in jail, even I would have taken that bet... Who's America's dad now?", referring to Bill Cosby's sexual assault cases.

=== Philanthropy ===
Murphy has donated money to the AIDS Healthcare Foundation, as well as cancer, education, creative arts, family support, health, and homeless charities. He has donated to the Martin Luther King Jr. Center, and $100,000 to the Screen Actors' Guild's strike relief fund.

Murphy has paid for the funerals of several friends such as Redd Foxx and Rick James, and purchased a tombstone for the previously unmarked graves of Billie "Buckwheat" Thomas and Tim Moore, but does not attend funerals, having only attended two - those of his father and stepfather - and finding them emotionally overwhelming. His plan for himself is direct cremation with no funeral or memorial service.

=== Religious beliefs ===
Murphy was baptized as a Catholic. It was reported in a 2011 issue of Rolling Stone magazine that Murphy remarked, "... I don't want to have no religion. I have Christian-based values and beliefs."

=== Eddie Murphy Rule ===
Section 746 of the 2010 US Dodd–Frank Wall Street Reform and Consumer Protection Act, which prohibits securities trading based on non-public information misappropriated from a government source, is informally known as the "Eddie Murphy Rule". The term relates to the plot in the 1983 film Trading Places where illegally acquired market information was doctored and used (albeit not illegally in 1983) to short sell frozen orange juice concentrate.

=== Prostitute incident ===
On May 2, 1997, Murphy was stopped by police in West Hollywood, California, at 4:45 a.m. with Atisone Seiuli, a transgender prostitute, in his car. His publicist, Paul Bloch, denied that Murphy had intended to pay Seiuli for sex, saying that Murphy was only giving her a ride home. Murphy was not charged with any crime, though Seiuli had to spend 90 days in the LA County jail, but the incident caused him a number of public relations problems.

== Discography ==
- How Could It Be (1985)
- So Happy (1989)
- Love's Alright (1993)

== Filmography ==
Selected filmography:

- 48 Hrs. (1982)
- Trading Places (1983)
- Beverly Hills Cop (1984)
- The Golden Child (1986)
- Beverly Hills Cop II (1987)
- Eddie Murphy: Raw (1987)
- Coming to America (1988)
- Harlem Nights (1989)
- Another 48 Hrs. (1990)
- Boomerang (1992)
- The Distinguished Gentleman (1992)
- Beverly Hills Cop III (1994)
- Vampire in Brooklyn (1995)
- The Nutty Professor (1996)
- Mulan (1998)
- Dr. Dolittle (1998)
- Bowfinger (1999)
- Nutty Professor II: The Klumps (2000)
- Shrek (2001)
- Dr. Dolittle 2 (2001)
- The Adventures of Pluto Nash (2002)
- Daddy Day Care (2003)
- The Haunted Mansion (2003)
- Shrek 2 (2004)
- Dreamgirls (2006)
- Norbit (2007)
- Shrek the Third (2007)
- Meet Dave (2008)
- Imagine That (2009)
- Shrek Forever After (2010)
- Tower Heist (2011)
- A Thousand Words (2012)
- Mr. Church (2016)
- Dolemite Is My Name (2019)
- Coming 2 America (2021)
- You People (2023)
- Candy Cane Lane (2023)
- Beverly Hills Cop: Axel F (2024)
- The Pickup (2025)
- Shrek 5 (2027)

== Awards and nominations ==
Murphy has received numerous accolades including a Emmy Award, a Grammy Award, a Golden Globe Award, and a Screen Actors Guild Award. He earned a nomination for the Academy Award for Best Supporting Actor his role in Dreamgirls (2006). He lost to Alan Arkin for his performance in Little Miss Sunshine (2006). For Murphy's role as Donkey in Shrek (2001), he won the Annie Award for Outstanding Achievement for Voice Acting in a Feature Production and was nominated for the BAFTA Award for Best Actor in a Supporting Role for the latter, which to date the only voice-over performance to ever be nominated in BAFTA's history.

He has also received numerous honorary accolades including the Mark Twain Prize for American Humor in 2015, the Critics' Choice Award for Lifetime Achievement in 2019, the Golden Globe Cecil B. DeMille Award in 2023, and the 51st AFI Life Achievement Award in 2026.
