= So Happy =

1989 studio album by Eddie Murphy

Studio album by Eddie Murphy
- Released: August 1989
- Genre: Funk; soul; R&B; new jack swing
- Length: 48:26
- Label: Columbia
- Producer: Walter Afanasieff, Larry Blackmon, David Allen Jones, Eddie Murphy, Nile Rodgers, Narada Michael Walden

Eddie Murphy chronology
How Could It Be (1985)	So Happy (1989)	Love's Alright (1993)

So Happy is the second music album by American actor, comedian, and singer Eddie Murphy, released in August 1989 by Columbia Records. A funk and soul effort with often humorous sexual lyrics, it was co-written and co-produced by Murphy with several high-profile contemporary musicians, such as Nile Rodgers and Larry Blackmon, at various recording studios in California, New York, Florida, and the Bahamas. The album was not a commercial success and received mixed reviews.

== Release ==
So Happy was released by Columbia Records in August 1989 and failed to significantly impact the pop record charts. It reached number 70 on Billboard magazine's Top Pop Albums and number 22 on the Top Black Albums chart. The pop-funk song "Put Your Mouth on Me" was released as the album's lead single, performing well on both Billboard's pop and black singles charts.

== Critical reception ==
Professional ratings
Review scores
Source	Rating
Los Angeles Times	2.5/5 stars
The Rolling Stone Album Guide	.5/5 stars
The Village Voice	B+

Reviewing So Happy in August 1989, Chicago Tribune journalist Chris Heim viewed it as an improvement over Murphy's first album, saying that the comedian "seems more comfortable in the role of vocalist this time". Similarly, The Village Voice critic Robert Christgau observed a greater seriousness in Murphy's "wheedling croon" that is ideal for the album's cartoonish style of funk and "wicked Prince rip". While questioning the depth behind the sexual desires in Murphy's lyrics, Christgau highlighted the singer's humor on songs such as "Love Moans": "He's big on locations, spends an entire song convincing her to do it in a chair. Inspirational Dialogue: She: 'Are you close?' He: 'If I get any closer I be behind you.'"

Don Waller was more critical in his review for the Los Angeles Times. He applauded the sexual conceit of "Put Your Mouth on Me" and the compelling musical qualities in "Bubble Hill" and the title track, but found rest of the album derivative and Murphy merely "better than your average shower singer". In Mark Coleman and J. D. Considine's entry on Murphy in The Rolling Stone Album Guide (1992), the comedian is criticized for not only lacking "the equipment to carry off his soul-star ambitions", but seeming "genuinely uncomfortable trying to deliver any but the most basic emotions" and resorting to an emphasis on "musical jokes" that "wears thin throughout So Happy".

== Track listing ==
No.	Title	Writer(s)	Producer(s)	Length
1.	"Put Your Mouth on Me"	Eddie Murphy; Narada Michael Walden; Jeffrey Cohen	Walden	4:06
2.	"Till the Money's Gone"	Murphy; Walden; Skyler Jett	Walden; Walter "Babylove" Afanasieff (assoc.)	5:16
3.	"I Got It"	Nile Rodgers	Rodgers	4:09
4.	"So Happy"	Murphy; David Allen Jones	Murphy; Jones	4:28
5.	"Bubble Hill"	Murphy; Jones	Murphy; Jones	6:18
6.	"With All I Know"	Murphy; Trenten Gumbs	Murphy; Jones	4:06
7.	"Pretty Please"	Murphy	Murphy; Jones	3:43
8.	"Love Moans"	Murphy; Jones	Murphy; Jones	5:15
9.	"Let's Get with It"	Larry Blackmon; Murphy; Merv De Peyer	Blackmon	5:07
10.	"Tonight"	David Dukes	Blackmon	5:36

== Personnel ==
Information is taken from AllMusic.

=== Musicians ===
- Eddie Murphy – lead vocals, drum programming (5), keyboards (5–7), background vocals (5, 8)
- Walter "Babylove" Afanasieff – keyboards (1, 2); synthesizers, synth bass, drum programming, and horn solo (2)
- Alfa Anderson – background vocals (3)
- John Barnes – keyboards (5)
- Vernon Black – guitar (1)
- Larry Blackmon – background vocals (9, 10)
- Lanar Brantley – bass guitar (6, 7)
- Briz – background vocals (3)
- Eric Daniels – horn stabs (1)
- Merv De Peyer – keyboards and programming (9, 10)
- Johnny Gill – guitar (5)
- Greg "Gigi" Gonaway – percussion (1)
- Richard Hilton – keyboard programming (3)
- Randy Jackson – bass (1), background vocals (2)
- Tomi Jenkins – background vocals (9, 10)
- Skyler Jett – background vocals (2)
- David Allen Jones – arrangements (4–8), drum programming (4, 8), drums (6, 7), keyboards (5–7), keyboards programming (8), instruments (8), background vocals (5, 8)
- Kevin Jones – keyboard programming (3)
- Kevin Kendrick – keyboards and programming (9, 10)
- Ken Klyce – Fairlight CMI (1, 2), Emulator II programming (2)
- Andres Levin – keyboard programming (3)
- Christopher Max – background vocals (3)
- Stacy McDonald – background vocals (8)
- Chip McNeill – saxophone (9, 10)
- Sammy Merendino – programming (9, 8)
- Cindy Mizelle – background vocals (6, 7)
- Paul Pesco – guitar (6, 7)
- Claytoven Richardson – background vocals (1)
- Carmen Rizzo – drum programming (5)
- Nile Rodgers – guitar and background vocals (3)
- Philippe Saisse – keyboard programming (3)
- Charlie Singleton – guitar (9, 10)
- Bongo Bob Smith – percussion programming and sampling (1)
- Neil Stubenhaus – bass guitar (4)
- Narada Michael Walden – arrangements (1, 2), drums (1)
- Marty Walsh – guitar (4)
- Audrey Wheeler – background vocals (6, 7)
- Aaron Zigman – keyboards (4)

=== Production and design ===
- Paul Angelli – second engineer (3)
- John Barnes – engineer and mixing (9, 10)
- Knut Bohn – engineer (3)
- Ed Brooks – second engineer (3)
- Dana Jon Chappelle – engineer (2), assistant engineer (1, 2)
- Tom Durack – mixing (3)
- David Frazer – engineer (1), additional engineering (2), mixing (1, 2)
- Eddie Garscia – engineer (6), mixing (5)
- Mark Hermann – second engineer (8)
- Cecil Holmes – executive producer
- Daniel Lazerus – engineer (4)
- Jay Mark – engineer (8)
- Dennis Mitchell – engineer (5)
- Barney Perkins – engineer and mixing (9, 10)
- Elliot Peters – assistant engineer (9, 10)
- David Rideau – mixing (4, 8)
- Carmen Rizzo – engineer (5)
- Tony Sellari – art direction
- Bonnie Schiffman – photography
- Anthony Sellari – art direction
- Shawn Stoblo – second mixing engineer (4)
- Steve Strassman – engineer (4)
- Mike Strick – assistant engineer (9, 10)
- Brad Sundberg – additional engineering (1)
- Ralph Sutton – engineer (8)

== Charts ==
Chart (1989)	Peak position
U.S. Top Pop Albums (Billboard)	70
U.S. Top Black Albums (Billboard)	22
