= Party All the Time =

1985 single by Eddie Murphy

Single by Eddie Murphy

from the album How Could It Be
- Released: September 23, 1985
- Recorded: c. January 18–22, 1985
- Studio: The Joint Recording Studio (Buffalo, New York)
- Genre: Synth-pop; funk; disco
- Length: 4:08 (album version); 5:18 (extended 12" version)
- Label: Columbia; CBS
- Songwriter: Rick James
- Producer: Rick James

Eddie Murphy singles chronology
"Boogie in Your Butt/No More Tears" (1982)	"Party All the Time" (1985)	"How Could It Be" (1985)

Music video
- "Party All the Time" on YouTube

"Party All the Time" is a song by comedian and actor Eddie Murphy, written and produced by Rick James. It was the lead single from Murphy's 1985 debut musical album How Could It Be. It reached number two on the Billboard Hot 100 for three weeks, behind "Say You, Say Me" by Lionel Richie.

== Production ==
When Murphy informed actor/comedian Richard Pryor that he was doing an album, Pryor offered him a $100,000 bet that Murphy wouldn't be able to do a purely musical album without jokes. In a 2023 appearance on Jimmy Kimmel Live!, Murphy said that Pryor never paid him the money before his death in 2005.

The single was recorded at Rick James's home studio in Buffalo, New York, during what would go on to be named Buffalo's "Six-Pack" storm (named after a quote from Mayor James D. Griffin), where 33 inches of snow and 50 mile per hour wind speeds shut down the city.

Originally only planning to stay in Buffalo for a weekend to record the song, Murphy ended up being stuck inside with James for two weeks. In addition to writing and producing the song, James also provided additional ad-libs and backing vocals.

== Reception ==
A reader in the Los Angeles Times, Barbara Bryson, criticized the song, characterizing it as "Gumby goes disco" (referring to the character parodied by Murphy on Saturday Night Live). The publication also placed the song at number one on "The Video Bottom 10" list. Meanwhile, critic Scott Benarde in the Ft. Lauderdale Sun-Sentinel awarded the song his worst single for 1985, calling it a "catchy uptempo dance number" but asserting that "Murphy adds nothing but his ego to it. His voice is paper thin and buried in the mix. Anyone could have sung that tune the way it was produced. Murphy should stick to imitating Gumby."

The song's music video won best urban contemporary video award at the American Video Awards in November 1985.

== Personnel ==
- Eddie Murphy – lead vocal
- Rick James – drums, percussion, backing vocals, production
- Kenny Hawkins – guitar
- Greg Levias – keyboards
- Levi Ruffin – keyboards, backing vocals
- LaMorris Payne – backing vocals

== Charts ==
=== Weekly charts ===
Chart (1985–1986)	Peak position
Australia (Kent Music Report)	21
Belgium (Ultratop 50 Flanders)	26
Canada (RPM)	4
Finland (Suomen virallinen lista)	16
Germany (Media Control Charts)	9
New Zealand (RIANZ)	3
UK Singles (Official Charts)	87
US Billboard Hot 100	2
US Billboard Hot Black Singles	8
US Billboard Dance/Electronic Singles Sales	7
US Billboard Dance Music/Club Play Singles	19

=== Year-end charts ===
Chart (1986)	Rank
US Top Pop Singles (Billboard)	7

== Certifications ==
Region	Certification	Certified units/sales
Canada (Music Canada)	Gold	50,000^{^}
United States (RIAA)	Platinum	1,000,000^{^}
^{^} Shipments figures based on certification alone.

== Remixes and covers ==
In 2006, house DJ and producer Sharam Tayebi of Deep Dish released a remix of the song, known simply as "PATT" (an acronym for "Party All the Time"), which peaked at No. 8 on the UK Singles Chart on December 30, 2006 and at No. 4 on the Polish Airplay Chart in early 2007. The song also peaked at number 87 on the Australian ARIA Charts.

In 2014, Gwyneth Paltrow covered the song in the Glee season 5 episode "New Directions".

In 2019, American progressive rock/metal band Thank You Scientist released a cover of the song, accompanied by a humorous music video.

In 2023, American boy band Big Time Rush released their version of the song titled "I Just Want To (Party All the Time)" for their album Another Life. Also in 2023 a remix by Hannah Laing and HVRR reached number 51 in the UK Singles Chart.

In 2026, American artist Sturgill Simpson (under his stage name Johnny Blue Skies) released a cover of the song as the ninth track on his album, Mutiny After Midnight, which explored disco themes alongside country styles.
