= Hudlin =

Hudlin is a surname. Notable people with the surname include:

- Reginald Hudlin (born 1961), American writer, film director, and producer
- Warrington Hudlin (born 1952), American film director, producer, and actor
- Willis Hudlin (1906–2002), American baseball player
