= Tony Jones (wrestler) =

American professional wrestler (1971–2024)

Personal information
- Born: Anthony Jones; April 6, 1971 San Francisco, California, U.S.
- Died: April 11, 2024 (aged 53) Daly City, California, U.S.
- Children: 2
- Website: TSTJ.net

Professional wrestling career
- Ring name(s): Tony Jones; Hard to Kill
- Billed height: 6 ft 5 in (196 cm)
- Billed weight: 270 lb (122 kg)
- Debut: January 15, 1997
- Retired: December 3, 2017

Anthony Jones (April 6, 1971 – April 11, 2024) was an American professional wrestler who competed in North American independent promotions, specifically California-based All Pro Wrestling, Ultimate Pro Wrestling and Xtreme Pro Wrestling.

Jones also had stints in World Wrestling Entertainment in 1998, 2001, 2003, and 2007 although he is best known for his appearance with sometimes tag team partner Mike Modest in Barry W. Blaustein's 1999 documentary Beyond the Mat.

== Early life ==
Born in San Francisco, Jones graduated from Archbishop Riordan High School in 1989 and later attended San Francisco State University earning a bachelor arts degree in broadcasting and electronic communication arts and a minor in speech communication arts. He also achieved a successful five-year amateur wrestling career during his time at SFSU winning the Bay Area Freestyle Championship eight times, the Bay Area Greco-Roman Championship seven times and becoming a nationally ranked contender in NCAA collegiate wrestling and eventually became the NCAA Division II California Collegiate Champion in 1994; during this time, he defeated NCAA champion Stephen Neal and was in several tournaments with Kurt Angle (although the two never wrestled each other, they both were eliminated by the same man).

Jones also served as an assistant coach for the SFSU Greco-Roman freestyle wrestling team before his graduation in 1995.

== Career ==
=== All Pro Wrestling ===
During 1996, Jones began training under Mike Modest at the APW Professional Wrestling Training Boot Camp along with Donovan Morgan and Vic Grimes graduating from the training camp making his professional debut wrestling against Manny "The Raging Bull" Fernandez at APW Gym Wars on January 15, 1997.

Feuding with Vic Grimes in his early months with the promotion, he lost to Grimes at APW Gym Wars on April 19 and on June 20, the latter defeat eliminating him from the opening round of a tournament for the APW Universal Championship.

Jones soon found success in the tag team division however forming the Westside Connection with Jay Smooth defeating Donovan Morgan and Robert Thompson for the APW Universal Tag Team titles on August 1, 1997. Successfully defending the titles for over a month, including a victory over Vic Grimes & Chris Cole on August 15, he and Smooth lost the titles to the Grimes Brothers (Vic & Little Dic Grimes) at APW Sports Annihilation on September 5, 1997.

Jones attempted to regain the titles teaming with Rick Turner, although they lost to the Grimes Brothers in a Best of 3 Falls match at APW Night of the Return on October 3. He later lost to Grimes at APW Halloween Hell on October 31, although he later won a 6-man tag team match with Elijah Wisdom and Truth against Rick Thompson and the Grimes Brothers at APW Final Friday on November 7, 1997.

Teaming with Steve Rizzono, Jones regained the tag team titles defeating Robert Thompson & Chris Cole on December 6. After Rizzono was suspended by the promotion, Jones was forced to surrender the titles to APW which were officially vacated on January 17, 1998. That same night, he was given an opportunity to win back the titles and chose Mike Modest who together went on to defeat Frank Murdoch and his former tag team partner Jay Smooth.

Forming Wrestling Inc., he and Modest had a highly successful tag team career eventually voted APW Tag Team of the Year and, as tag team champions, held the titles for almost four months defeating Vic Grimes & Erin O'Grady at APW Wrestling Inc on March 6 and wrestled to a no-contest against Vic Grimes & Boyce LeGrande at APW Turn Back The Clock on April 3 before losing the title to Frank Murdoch & Boom Boom Comini on May 16, 1998.

=== Independent promotions ===
During that year, he and Modest were selected by Barry W. Blaustein to appear in his wrestling documentary Beyond the Mat, which profiled their lives as independent wrestlers breaking into professional wrestling. The documentary, which was released theatrically in 2000, gave both wrestlers national exposure, as Jones and Modest had a tryout match with the World Wrestling Federation in September. It later led to Jones being invited to the WWF Dojo Training Camp, training under Tom Prichard in November 1999.

Involved in a West Coast vs. East Coast feud with wrestlers from Pennsylvania Championship Wrestling in early 1999, he won the APW Universal Heavyweight titles defeating his former tag team partner Mike Modest on January 15, 2000. After losing the title to Ma'och with interference from Crash Holly on March 11, he began competing with hip-hop based Urban Wrestling Alliance under the name H.T.K. or Hard To Kill during most of 2000. In February 2000, he participated in a closed tryout match for World Championship Wrestling with Terry Taylor, Kevin Sullivan and Mike Graham and, after touring Japan with the shoot-style wrestling promotion BattlARTS in April, was invited back to train at the WCW Power Plant with Buddy Lee Parker, Paul Orndorff and Terry Taylor in May.

Returning BattlArts in May and June 2000, he began wrestling for Ultimate Pro Wrestling in May and had a brief stint in Xtreme Pro Wrestling in a series of high-profile matches against Tracy Smothers at XPW D-Day. After losing to Pogo the Clown on May 28, he was invited by BattlARTS for another tour however he declined being under contract with the Urban Wrestling Alliance and remained with the promotion until its close in December 2000.

=== Return to APW ===
Returning to All Pro Wrestling for a brief time, he teamed with Giant Khali in his wrestling debut against the Westside Playaz 2000 on October 7, 2000 and later with his old rival Robert Thompson as the Original Westside Playaz defeating the Ballard Brothers for the titles on April 14, 2001. Losing the titles to Boyce LeGrande and Mark Smith on June 9, they later regained the titles defeating the Ballard Brothers and Samoa Joe and Keiji Sakoda on September 29; the titles were forfeited however when Jones attacked Thompson after the match and left the promotion in November.

=== Later years ===
Appearing on WWF Jakked against Raven in May 2001, he wrestled in the Chicago-based Midwest Championship Wrestling from August to September 2001.

During the next year, he continued wrestling for Ultimate Pro Wrestling as well as feuding with former XPW stars Pogo the Clown, Steve Rizzono and Manny Fernandez. He also began competing for Pro Wrestling IRON, affiliated with the Japanese promotion Pro Wrestling Noah, teaming with Jason Brisbane to defeat Lars Dauger and Ryan Drago at a Pro Wrestling IRON event on June 11, 2004.

In March 2007, he appeared on WWE television, wrestling Eugene on WWE Heat. Tony returned to WWE television four months later against Gene Snitsky. He lost both matches.

== Death ==
Tony Jones died on April 11, 2024, at the age of 53.

== Championships and accomplishments ==
- All Pro Wrestling
  - APW Universal Heavyweight Championship (1 time)
  - APW Universal Tag Team Championship (5 times) - with Jay Smooth (1), Steve Rizzono (1), Mike Modest (1) and Robert Thompson (2)
  - APW Tag Team of the Year (1998) - with Mike Modest
- Ultimate Pro Wrestling
  - UPW Southern California Heavyweight Championship (1 time)
- Pro Wrestling Illustrated
  - Ranked No. 213 of the 500 top wrestlers in the PWI 500 in 2004

== See also ==
- List of premature professional wrestling deaths
