= Cosmic Slop (film) =

1994 anthology television film

- Television release poster
- Genre: Drama; Science fiction; Supernatural fiction
- Created by: Reginald Hudlin
- Based on: "The Space Traders" by Derrick Bell; "Tang" by Chester Himes
- Written by: Trey Ellis ("Space Traders"); Warrington Hudlin ("The First Commandment"); Kyle Baker ("Tang")
- Directed by: Reginald Hudlin ("Space Traders"); Warrington Hudlin ("The First Commandment"); Kevin Rodney Sullivan ("Tang")
- Presented by: George Clinton
- Music by: John Barnes
- Country of origin: United States
- Original language: English

Production
- Executive producers: Reginald Hudlin; Warrington Hudlin
- Producer: Ernest Johnson
- Cinematography: Peter Deming
- Editors: Stephen Semel ("Space Traders"); Richard Candib ("The First Commandment"); Victor DuBois ("Tang")
- Running time: 83 minutes
- Production companies: HBO; Hudlin Bros.

Original release
- Network: HBO
- Release: November 8, 1994

Cosmic Slop is a 1994 American anthology television film created by Reginald Hudlin, who executive produced with his brother Warrington Hudlin. The film is hosted by musician and Parliament-Funkadelic frontman George Clinton, and derives its title from the 1973 album and song of the same name by Clinton and Funkadelic.

Cosmic Slop features three short segments. The first, "Space Traders", was directed by Reginald Hudlin, written by Trey Ellis, and based on the short story "The Space Traders" by Derrick Bell. The second, "The First Commandment", was written and directed by Warrington Hudlin. The third, "Tang", was directed by Kevin Rodney Sullivan, written by Kyle Baker, and based on the short story "Tang" by Chester Himes. The film's ensemble cast includes Robert Guillaume, Jason Bernard, Edward Edwards, Larry Anderson, Nicholas Turturro, Richard Herd, Paula Jai Parker, and Chi McBride.

== Cast ==
=== "Space Traders" ===
- Robert Guillaume as Gleason Golightly
- Michele Lamar Richards as Gail Golightly
- Jason Bernard as Bernard Shields
- Bob Gunton as President Ellis
- Edward Edwards as Chief of Staff
- George Wallace as "Piggy"
- Brian Reddy as Vice President
- Larry Anderson as "Stryker" O'Rourke
- Brock Peters as Minister Coombs
- Ebonie Smith as Jennifer
- Craig Kirkwood as Lenny
- Liz Larou as Ute
- Special appearances by:
  - Bertice Berry
  - Franklin Cover
  - Casey Kasem
  - Roxie Roker

=== "The First Commandment" ===
- Nicholas Turturro as Father Carlos
- Efrain Figueroa as Padrino
- Richard Herd as Cardinal
- J. Kenneth Campbell as Mr. Spivey
- Daryl Mitchell as Mover #1
- Eugene Allen as Mover #2
- Noelle Balfour as The Saint
- Bob Wisdom as Captain Jackson
- Marcus Saldago as Young Man In The Botanica
- George Logan as Male Drug Dealer
- Kelly Jo Minter as Female Drug Dealer
- Ana Mercedes as Blessed Woman
- John Witherspoon as Homeless Man #1
- Chino Fats Williams as Homeless Man #2
- Bowlegged Lou as Homeless Man #3

=== "Tang" ===
- Paula Jai Parker as Tang
- Chi McBride as "T-Bone"
- Reno Wilson as The Messenger

== Release ==
Cosmic Slop premiered on HBO at 10:00 pm Eastern Standard Time on November 8, 1994.

== Reception ==
Ken Parish Perkins of the Chicago Tribune likened Cosmic Slop to "a multicultural Twilight Zone filled with political and racial angst," calling it "offbeat, humorous and disturbingly effective." Perkins concluded that "the Hudlin brothers have created a politically charged anthology that doesn't flinch or apologize for its views. This could ultimately prove unsettling, even to the usually risk-taking executives at HBO." Mike Duffy of the Detroit Free Press wrote that Cosmic Slop "suffers erratic, hit-and-miss moments," save for the "Tang" segment; Duffy wrote that "Tang" "echoes the provocative intelligence of the original Twilight Zone", and praised the performances of Parker and McBride.
