= Candy Cane Lane (film) =

2023 film by Reginald Hudlin

- Release poster
- Directed by: Reginald Hudlin
- Written by: Kelly Younger
- Produced by: Brian Grazer; Eddie Murphy; Karen Lunder; Charisse Hewitt-Webster
- Starring: Eddie Murphy; Tracee Ellis Ross; Jillian Bell; Thaddeus J. Mixson; Ken Marino; Trevante Rhodes; David Alan Grier; Nick Offerman
- Cinematography: Newton Thomas Sigel
- Edited by: Jim May; Kenny G. Krauss
- Music by: Marcus Miller
- Production companies: Imagine Entertainment; Bubble Pictures; Big Indie Pictures
- Distributed by: Amazon MGM Studios
- Release date: December 1, 2023
- Running time: 120 minutes
- Country: United States
- Language: English

Candy Cane Lane is a 2023 American Christmas fantasy comedy film directed by Reginald Hudlin and written by Kelly Younger. The film stars Eddie Murphy, Tracee Ellis Ross, Jillian Bell, Thaddeus J. Mixon, Ken Marino, Trevante Rhodes, David Alan Grier, and Nick Offerman. It tells the story of a laid-off corporate marketer who makes a deal with a wicked Christmas elf to win his street's house decoration contest.

Candy Cane Lane was released by Amazon Prime Video on December 1, 2023.

== Plot ==
Corporate marketer Chris Carver makes his own hand-carved decorations for the local neighborhood Christmas decoration competition but has never won, thus being envious of his neighbor Bruce who repeatedly wins with inflatables and other inexpensive mass market decorations. Shortly before Christmas, he is laid off, leading to him desperately competing for the $100,000 prize given to the winner by Prism Cable.

Seeking supplies, Chris and his youngest daughter Holly stumble across a mysterious Christmas shop called "Kringle's", filled with beautiful decorations and figurines. He buys a large tree-shaped zoetrope based on "The Twelve Days of Christmas". When presented with the receipt, Chris is urged to sign it by shopkeeper Pepper without reading the fine print. Using the new decoration, the family impresses at the competition.

The next day, the images from the tree are gone and there are seven swans swimming in the family's pool. Chris blames Bruce for the act and returns to Kringle's with Holly, seeking replacements. Meanwhile, Chris's wife Carol is attacked at work by six geese laying and three French hens (wearing Frenchman costumes).

Upon returning to the shop, they meet several living glass figurines in a Christmas village: Pip, Cordelia, Gary, and a group of carolers. They explain that Pepper is an evil Christmas elf who has tricked Chris into a Faustian bargain, and that they are all previous victims of hers. Chris has to find five golden rings held by the missing images, now alive, before 8 p.m. on Christmas Eve or else he will turn into a figurine as well.

Chris and Holly acquire the first two rings from the two turtledoves and the three French hens. Then he rescues the figurines, taking them home in the village's clock tower, where he shows them to his family.

At Chris's older daughter Joy's track meet, Pepper has the eight maids milking and ten lords leaping attack the family. Despite the chaos, they manage to retrieve the third and fourth rings. Joy, however, becomes upset when her father inadvertently insults a college recruiter, leading her and her brother Nick to accuse him of focusing on Christmas for his own sake and not letting them live their own lives.

Back at home, Chris reveals what is going on, so the family resolves to help. Realizing that Pepper has the fifth ring, they set up a trap for her during the night of the competition, where everyone learns from Prism Cable's news program that the $100,000 reward is actually in taco coupons.

After trapping Pepper and getting her ring, Santa Claus appears to send her back to the North Pole. When Chris presents the five rings to her, she taunts him, saying he needs more. As "five golden rings" is said eight times in "The Twelve Days of Christmas", the family realize they need 40 rings.

Pepper then unleashes the remaining decorations (the nine ladies dancing are unseen) on the neighborhood. The Carvers scramble to get the rings, with Santa assisting them. Pepper then cheats by turning the clock tower forward five minutes, prematurely turning Chris into a figurine. The family only manages to get 38 rings, but Santa points out that Chris and Carol's wedding rings, made out of gold, bring the total to 40, turning Chris back to normal. Holly then has the other figurines returned to normal as her Christmas wish. Santa takes Pepper and all the former figurines except for Pip on his sleigh, saying goodbye to the Carvers.

On Christmas morning, the Carvers enjoy their free tacos with Bruce and his family, as Chris made amends with him. Pip then arrives, wishing to not spend Christmas alone, and is welcomed by the family.

One week later in the mid-credits, Pepper is then shown to have been turned into a glass figurine by Santa as punishment where her good behavior will get her back to the reindeer poop-scooping rank. Chris has gained ownership of Pepper's store, now renamed "Chris Kringle's".

== Cast ==
- Eddie Murphy as Chris Carver, a laid off corporate marketer who loves Christmas. Murphy also voiced his character in glass figurine form.
- Tracee Ellis Ross as Carol Carver, Chris' wife who works in a factory.
- Jillian Bell as Pepper, a wicked Christmas elf who poses as a pop-up store owner ever since she was exiled from the North Pole. Bell also voiced her character in glass figurine form in the mid-credits.
- Genneya Walton as Joy Carver, an athlete, the oldest daughter of Chris and Carol, who is looking to go to a college that is not close to home.
- Thaddeus J. Mixson as Nick Carver, an aspiring musician who is the son of Chris and Carol.
- Madison Thomas as Holly Carver, the youngest daughter of Chris and Carol.
- Nick Offerman as Pip, a man and one of Pepper's victims. Offerman also voices his character in cabbie glass figurine form.
- Chris Redd as Lamplighter Gary, a man and one of Pepper's victims. Redd also voices his character in a lamplighter glass figurine form.
- Robin Thede as Cordelia, a woman and one of Pepper's victims. Thede also voices her character in a peasant glass figurine form.
- David Alan Grier as Santa Claus, a holiday figure.
- Ken Marino as Bruce, one of the Carver family's neighbors who decorated his yard with inflatable pop-up figures.
- Anjelah Johnson-Reyes as Shelly, one of the Carver family's neighbors.
- Lombardo Boyar as Scott, one of the Carver family's neighbors and Shelly's husband.
- Timothy Simons as Emerson, the co-host of Prism Cable's news program.
- Danielle Pinnock as Kit, the co-host of Prism Cable's news program.
- Iman Benson as Selah
- Trevante Rhodes as Tre, a weather forecaster for Prism Cable's news program.
- Riki Lindhome as Suz
- Catherine Dent as Lee
- Stephen Tobolowsky as Mr. Benedetto
- Amanda Schoonover as Pam

Additionally, Pentatonix (Scott Hoying, Kirstin Maldonado, Mitch Grassi, Kevin Olusola and Matt Sallee) portray the carolers and also voice them in their caroler glass figurine forms.

== Production ==
In July 2022, it was reported that Eddie Murphy would star in and produce a new holiday comedy film as part of a three-film first-look deal with Amazon Prime Video. Reginald Hudlin, who directed Murphy in Boomerang (1992), would direct, while Kelly Younger wrote the script, inspired by his childhood holiday experiences. In January 2023, Tracee Ellis Ross was cast opposite Murphy. Jillian Bell, Robin Thede, Nick Offerman, Chris Redd and Danielle Pinnock were cast in the film. The film is produced by Murphy, Brian Grazer, Karen Lunder, and Charisse Hewitt-Webster, and executive produced by Doug Merrifield.

Principal photography took place in Los Angeles from December 2022 to February 2023.

During the shooting of the film in March 2023, Jon Farhat was seriously injured. According to a lawsuit filed by Farhat in September 2023, a tent was blown off its feet due to severe weather and into him. He was reportedly still bedridden as of June 2024.

== Release ==
Candy Cane Lane was released on December 1, 2023 by Amazon MGM Studios on their streaming service Prime Video.

== Reception ==
On the review aggregator website Rotten Tomatoes, 46% of 70 critics' reviews are positive, with an average rating of 5.4/10. The website's consensus reads: "Candy Cane Lane gets credit for its willingness to get weird, but in most other respects, this Eddie Murphy-led holiday comedy is a dead end." Metacritic, which uses a weighted average, assigned the film a score of 47 out of 100, based on 14 critics, indicating "mixed or average" reviews.

Richard Roeper of the Chicago Sun-Times gave the film a score of two out of four, writing "Candy Cane Lane is a stunningly uneven film that careens between cornball family drama, slapstick comedy and special-effects-laden gimmickry". James Dyer writing for Empire scored the film a three out of five saying, "Part It's A Wonderful Life, part Drag Me To Hell, this unholy concoction of ideas is unlikely to become a seasonal staple, but sift through the nonsense and there’s a surprising amount to enjoy in this bonkers Noel nightmare. In what other film can you hear the phrase, 'This chicken is trippin'', and watch a psychotic elf kick Black Santa in the nuts?".

Owen Gleiberman of Variety criticized Murphy's persona as being too "forced". He further explained: "I wouldn't call Candy Cane Lane one of Murphy's good comedies; it's too long, too jammed together, and beneath it all too Christmas cookie cutter. Yet Murphy inhabits the role of a doting dad who lives for Christmas with reassuring ease". He closed his review writing, "Candy Cane Lane shows you that the Christmas movie as we've known it may be all used up, and that it has now entered its anything-goes surrealist phrase. 'Tis the season to be batty".
