= Jon Farhat =

Visual effects supervisor

Jon A. Farhat
- Occupation: Visual effects supervisor
- Years active: 1991-present

Jon A. Farhat is a motion picture visual effects supervisor and second unit director who was nominated at the 67th Academy Awards for the film The Mask, in the category of Best Visual Effects. His nomination was shared with Tom Bertino, Scott Squires and Steve 'Spaz' Williams. He was nominated for two BAFTA awards for Visual Effects for The Mask and The Nutty Professor Prior production roles included art director, matte painting, conceptual illustrator and storyboard artist dating back to 1992. Between 2012 and 2014, he served briefly as executive vice president of Red Digital Cinema Camera Company. A commercial helicopter pilot, Farhat pioneered research and developed systems and flight planning interfaces for Unmanned Aerial Vehicles, specializing in fully autonomous flight systems.

In March 2023, Farhat was seriously injured during a film shoot for Candy Cane Lane for Amazon MGM Studios. According to a lawsuit filed in September, a tent was blown off its feet due to severe weather and into him. He was reportedly still bedridden as of June 2024.

== Selected filmography as visual effects supervisor ==
- Candy Cane Lane (2023)
- Coming 2 America (2021)
- Hansel and Gretel: Witch Hunters (2013)
- The Book of Eli (2010)
- Wanted (2008)
- The Interpreter (2005)
- Doom (2005)
- Blue Crush (2002)
- Nutty Professor II: The Klumps (2000)
- Doctor Dolittle (1998)
- The Nutty Professor (1996)
- Dead Man (1995)
- The Mask (1994)
