= Reginald Hudlin =

American filmmaker

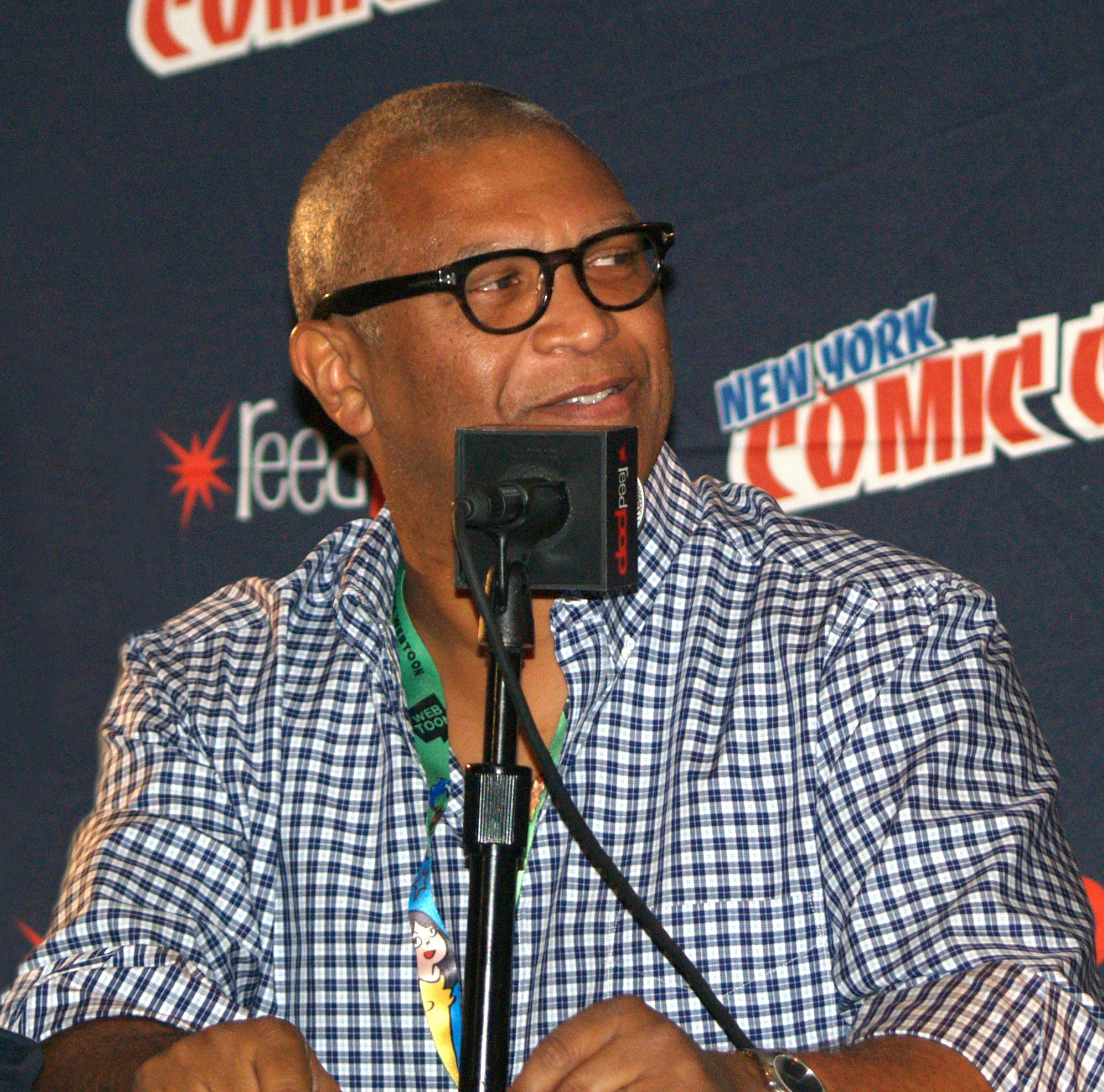
- Hudlin at the 2017 New York Comic Con
- Born: December 15, 1961 (age 64); Centreville, Illinois, U.S.
- Occupations: Director, writer, producer
- Years active: 1983–present
- Known for: House Party; Boomerang
- Spouse: Chrisette Suter (m. 2002)
- Children: 2
- Relatives: Warrington Hudlin (brother)

Reginald Alan Hudlin (born December 15, 1961) is an American director, writer, and producer. Along with his older brother Warrington Hudlin, he is known as one of the Hudlin Brothers. From 2005 to 2008, Hudlin was President of Entertainment for Viacom's BET. Hudlin has written numerous graphic novels. He co-produced the 88th Academy Awards ceremony in 2016 as well as other TV specials.

Hudlin's breakout film was House Party (1990). He directed the 1992 film Boomerang. Alongside Warrington, he executive produced the 1994 anthology television film Cosmic Slop, and directed the first of the film's three segments, "Space Traders". Hudlin worked as a producer on the 2012 film Django Unchained, directed by Quentin Tarantino, which received an Academy Award nomination for Best Picture.

== Early life ==
Hudlin was born in Centreville, Illinois, the son of a teacher couple. Hudlin's older brother, Warrington Hudlin, is also a film director, as well as an actor and producer.

The Hudlins grew up in East St. Louis, Illinois, where the family had deep roots. The Hudlin Brothers are paternal great-great-grandsons of Peter and Nancy Hudlin, who were part of the Underground Railroad. Their great uncle was tennis instructor Richard A. Hudlin, who mentored Arthur Ashe and Althea Gibson.

The Hudlins attended Katherine Dunham's Center for the Performing Arts, an experimental school, Warrington for high school and Reginald for after school martial arts classes. Hudlin has said that the experience was formative, and led to his older brother attending Yale University, and his attending Harvard University. In 1979, Hudlin graduated from Assumption Catholic High School in East St. Louis.

While an undergraduate at Harvard University, Hudlin directed his thesis project, a short film called House Party, which received numerous awards including first place at the Black American Cinema Society Awards. The film was inspired by his experience growing up in East St. Louis. In 1983, Hudlin graduated magna cum laude from Harvard with a B.A. in Visual and Environmental Studies. His short film thesis was the basis for his first feature film, House Party.

== Career ==
=== Film and television ===
After college, Hudlin and his brother formed a production company and made music videos for such artists as Heavy D, Jamaica Boys, and others. They additionally created the "Hey Love" 1980s TV commercial for a various-artists compilation record, that played regularly on late night TV.

Hudlin directed—with older brother Warrington producing—his first feature-length film, 1990's teen comedy House Party, which starred hip-hop duo Kid 'n Play. The film, distributed by New Line Cinema, was, according to Variety, one of the most profitable films of the decade. New Line wanted to make sequels, but the Hudlins did not feel the compensation or deals were adequate.

Hudlin directed 1992's Boomerang, again with older brother Warrington producing. The film was a big-budget romantic comedy that starred Eddie Murphy, who had a term deal at Paramount Pictures and hired the Hudlin Brothers because he liked House Party. It starred an all-black cast that included Robin Givens, Halle Berry, Martin Lawrence, David Alan Grier, and Chris Rock. A celebration of the 25th anniversary of Boomerang's release was held on July 1, 2017, at the National Museum of African American History and Culture in Washington, D.C., with a conversation between Hudlin and producer George Alexander.

In 1992, while making Boomerang, Hudlin wrote the animated film Bebe's Kids, which was championed by Paramount's Brandon Tartikoff, and was made in memory of comedian Robin Harris, who had died in 1990. In 1994, the Hudlin Brothers produced the HBO anthology television film Cosmic Slop, of which Hudlin directed the segment "Space Traders". The segment is an adaptation of the short story "The Space Traders" by Derrick Bell, found in Bell's book Faces at the Bottom of the Well: The Permanence of Racism. He then directed The Great White Hype (1996), The Ladies Man (2000), Serving Sara (2002), two episodes of the ABC TV series Modern Family, an episode of The Office, an episode of The Middle, and several episodes of Outsourced. He was a recurring producer and director of The Bernie Mac Show for three years.

From 2005 to 2008, Hudlin was the President of Entertainment for BET. Notable shows shepherded by Hudlin at that time included the documentary series American Gangster and Sunday Best, a gospel-music singing-competition show. Hudlin created The BET Honors and the BET Hip Hop Awards. Since 2013, Hudlin has been executive producer of the NAACP Image Awards.

Hudlin was a producer of Quentin Tarantino's Django Unchained, starring Jamie Foxx, Leonardo DiCaprio, Christoph Waltz, Kerry Washington, and Samuel L. Jackson. On January 10, 2013, Hudlin received an Academy Award nomination for Best Picture for the film.

In 2014, Hudlin produced the Black Movie Soundtrack celebration of Black music in film, held at Los Angeles' Hollywood Bowl and hosted by Craig Robinson. Black Movie Soundtrack II, also hosted by Robinson, was held in 2016.

By June 2017, Hudlin had been hired to direct a movie based on the comic Shadowman. That October, Hudlin's film Marshall, about Thurgood Marshall, the first African-American U.S. Supreme Court justice, starring Chadwick Boseman, was released. By July the following year, Hudlin had been hired to direct the Walt Disney Pictures film Safety for Disney+. In June 2021, Hudlin was announced to direct a film based on the comic Cinq branches de coton noir by Yves Sente and Steve Cuzor.

On July 12, 2021, it was announced that Hudlin, along with Ian Stewart, would be the executive producer for the 73rd Emmy Awards.

=== Comics & Graphic Novels ===
Hudlin wrote the Marvel Comics series Black Panther from 2005 to 2008, including the 2006 storyline "Bride of the Panther," which saw the character marry X-Men leader Storm. In 2015, DC Comics announced that Hudlin and artists Denys Cowan and Derek Dingle would be part of the relaunch of the publisher's Milestone Media imprint, founded by Cowan, Dingle and Dwayne McDuffie. The comic line returned in September 2020 with the Hudlin-penned Milestone Returns #0. Hudlin contributed a story to the Black Panther Annual #1, released in February 2018.

In 2015, Hudlin joined the board of the Comic Book Legal Defense Fund, a non-profit organization founded in 1986 chartered to protect the First Amendment rights of the comics community.

== Personal life ==
In 2002, Hudlin married Chrisette Hudlin (née Suter), a public relations consultant, in Montego Bay, Jamaica. They have two children.

Reginald Hudlin's lawyer at the time was Doug Emhoff. In 2013, Chrisette Hudlin set up Emhoff on a blind date with then-Attorney General of California and former Vice-President, Kamala Harris.

== Filmography ==
=== Feature films ===
Year	Title	Director	Producer	Writer	Notes
1990	House Party	Yes	No	Yes	
1992	Boomerang	Yes	No	No	
1992	Bebe's Kids	No	Executive	Yes	Also songwriter ("I Ain't Havin' It", "Freedom Song", "Straight Jackin'")
1996	The Great White Hype	Yes	No	No	
2000	The Ladies Man	Yes	No	No	
2002	Serving Sara	Yes	No	No	
2017	Marshall	Yes	Yes	No	
2019	The Black Godfather	Yes	No	No	Documentary
2020	Safety	Yes	No	No	
2022	Sidney	Yes	Executive	No	Documentary
2023	Candy Cane Lane	Yes	No	No	

Producer only

- Ride (1998)
- Django Unchained (2012)
- Burning Sands (2017)
- Paws of Fury: The Legend of Hank (2022) (Executive Producer)
- House Party (2023) (Executive Producer)

==== Acting roles ====
Year	Title	Role
1986	She's Gotta Have It	Dog 4
1990	House Party	Burglar #1
1992	Boomerang	Street Hustler
1993	Posse	Reporter 31
1996	Joe's Apartment	Rodney Roach (voice)
2000	The Ladies Man	Aloysius

Documentary Appearances

- Milestone Generations (2022) (Associate Producer)

=== Short films ===
Year	Title	Director	Writer
1983	House Party	Yes	Yes
1985	Reggie's World of Soul	Yes	No
1986	The Kold Waves	Yes	No

=== Television ===
Year	Title	Director	Producer	Writer	Notes
1994	Cosmic Slop	Yes	No	No	TV movie; segment: "Space Traders"
2000	City of Angels	Yes	No	No	Episode: "When Worlds Colitis"
2002–2005	The Bernie Mac Show	Yes	Yes	No	11 episodes
2005	Richard Pryor: The Funniest Man Dead or Alive	Yes	Executive	No	Documentary film
2005	Everybody Hates Chris	Yes	No	No	Episode: "Everybody Hates the Pilot"
2007	Wifey	Yes	No	No	TV movie
2009	Raising the Bar	Yes	No	No	Episode: "Making Up Is Hard to Do"
2009	The Middle	Yes	No	No	Episode: "Christmas"
2009	The Office	Yes	No	No	Episode: "Koi Pond"
2009–2010	Modern Family	Yes	No	No	Episodes: "Fears", "Come Fly with Me"
2010	Better Off Ted	Yes	No	No	Episode: "The Great Repression"
2010	Sons of Tucson	Yes	No	No	Episode: "Father's Day"
2010	Marvel's Black Panther	No	Executive	Yes	Also developer; actor as President (voice) in episode "To the End"
2010–2011	Outsourced	Yes	No	No	Episodes: "Temporary Monsanity", "The Todd Couple"
2010–2012	Psych	Yes	No	No	Episodes: "Ferry Tale" and "True Grits"
2011	Friends with Benefits	Yes	No	No	Episode: "The Benefit of Being Shallow"
2012	Are We There Yet?	Yes	No	No	Episodes: "The Expensive Purse Episode", "The Master of Ceremonies Episode", "The Quarantine Episode"
2013	Bones	Yes	No	No	Episode: "The Party in the Pants"
2013	How to Live with Your Parents (For the Rest of Your Life)	Yes	No	No	Episode: "How to Run the Show"
2014–2015	Bad Judge	Yes	No	No	Episodes: "Knife to a Gunfight", "Lockdown"
2014–2015	Marry Me	Yes	No	No	Episodes: "Stand by Me", "Change Me"
2014–2015	Murder in the First	Yes	No	No	Episodes: "Punch Drunk", "State of the Union", "Bruja Blanca"
2015	Weird Loners	Yes	No	No	Episode: "Weird Knight"
2015	New Girl	Yes	No	No	Episode: "Panty Gate"
2015	Telenovela	Yes	No	No	Episode: "Evil Twin"
2016	Heartbeat	Yes	No	No	Episode: "Backwards"
2016	Angel from Hell	Yes	No	No	Episode: "Angel Appreciation Day"
2016	Uncle Buck	Yes	No	No	Episodes: "I Got This", "Going to Jail Party"
2019	Black Monday	Yes	No	No	Episodes: "295", "243"
2019	The Last O.G.	Yes	No	No	Episodes: "Criminal Minded", "Your Mom's in My Business", "Fight the Power"

Executive producer only

Year	Title	Notes
2005–2008	The Boondocks	31 episodes
2006	Somebodies	Executive in charge of co-productions
2008	Brothers to Brutha	Network executive
2017	Blue & Green	TV movie

==== TV specials ====
Year	Title	Role
1994	The Last Days of Russell	Co-executive producer, director, writer
2006	Bring That Year Back 2006: Laugh Now, Cry Later	Network executive producer
2006	BET Hip Hop Awards	Executive in charge of production
2008	The BET Honors	Executive in charge of production
2010	Burr and Hart	Director
2013–present	NAACP Image Awards	Executive producer
2014	Governors Awards	Executive producer
2016	88th Academy Awards	Producer
2016	Showtime at the Apollo	Executive producer
2020–2022	Primetime Emmy Awards	Executive producer

== Awards ==
- 1986: Black American Cinema Society (film archives of the Western States Black Research Center), Black Independent Video and Film-maker's Awards, $1,500 first prize for House Party (short)
- 1990: Sundance Film Festival, Filmmakers Trophy for House Party
- 1990: Sundance Film Festival, Grand Jury Prize for House Party – nominee
- 1990: Deauville Film Festival, Critics Award for House Party – nominee
- 1991: Film Independent Spirit Award, Best First Feature for House Party – nominee
- 1991: Film Independent Spirit Award, Best Director for House Party – nominee
- 1995: CableACE, Dramatic or Theatrical Special for Cosmic Slop
- 2012: American Film Institute Awards 2012 for Django Unchained, Top 10 Films
- 2013: Academy Award for Best Picture for Django Unchained – nominee
- 2013: Golden Globe Award for Best Motion Picture – Drama for Django Unchained – nominee
- 2013: PGA Awards, Outstanding Producer of Theatrical Motion Pictures for Django Unchained – nominee
- 2015: Comic Con, Icon Award
- 2016: African-American Film Critics Association, Salute to Excellence Award
- 2016: Primetime Emmy Award for Outstanding Special Class Program for 88th Academy Awards – nominee
- 2021: Recipient of (Miami University of Ohio) Miami's Summer of ‘64 Award for his contributions in bringing the Black image to screen.

== Leadership and membership ==
- UCLA School of Theater, Film and Television, Board Member
- Academy of Motion Picture Arts and Sciences, Board of Governors

== Works and publications ==
Comics

- McGruder, Aaron; Hudlin, Reginald; Baker, Kyle (illustrations) (2004). Birth of a Nation: A Comic Novel. New York: Crown Publishers. ISBN 978-1-400-08316-9. OCLC 54857618.
- Hudlin, Reginald (writer); Romita Jr., John (penciler); Janson, Klaus (inker); White, Dean (colors) (2005). Black Panther: Who is the Black Panther. New York: Marvel. ISBN 978-0-785-11748-3. OCLC 780282040.
- Hudlin, Reginald (writer); Tan, Billy (pencils); Buckingham, Mark (pencils) (2005). Marvel Knights Spider-Man [Vol. 04], Wild Blue Yonder. New York: Marvel Comics. ISBN 978-0-785-11761-2. OCLC 830159672. – Contains material originally published in magazine form as Marvel Knights Spider-man #13-18
- David, Peter; Straczynski, J. Michael; Hudlin, Reginald; Wieringo, Mike (artist); Deodato, Mike (artist); Lee, Pat (artist) (2006). Spider-Man: The Other. New York: Marvel Pub. ISBN 978-0-785-12188-6. OCLC 62714568.
- Hudlin, Reginald (writer); Eaton, Scot (pencils) (2006). Black Panther: The Bride (Direct ed.). New York: Marvel. ISBN 978-0-785-12107-7. OCLC 948817543.
- Hudlin, Reginald (writer); Eaton, Scot (penciler); Garcia, Manuel (penciler); Turnbull, Koi (penciler); To, Marcus (penciler) (2007). Black Panther: Civil War. New York, NY: Marvel. ISBN 978-0-785-12235-7. OCLC 144224099.
- Hudlin, Reginald (writer); Portela, Francis (pencils) (2007). Black Panther: Four the Hard Way. New York: Marvel. ISBN 978-0-785-12655-3. OCLC 751756495. – Contains material originally published in single magazine form as: Black Panther #26-30
- Hudlin, Reginald (writer); Portela, Francis (penciler); Rodriguez, Carlos (penciler); Sharpe, Kevin (penciler); Cafu (penciler); Portela, Francis (inks); Hennessy, Bit & Andrew (inks); Staples, Val (colors) (2008). Black Panther: Back to Africa. New York: Marvel. ISBN 978-0-785-12452-8. OCLC 540015636. – Also includes Black Panther: Black to the Future
  - Hudlin, Reginald (writer); Stroman, Larry (pencils); Lashley, Ken (pencils); Paris, Roland (inks); Cuevas, Carlos (inks); Sibal, Jon (inks); Milla, Matt (colors); Staples, Val (colors); Petit, Cory (letters) (2008). Black Panther: Black to the Future. New York: Marvel. ISBN 978-0-785-12452-8. OCLC 540015636.
- Hudlin, Reginald (writer); Portela, Francis (art) (2008). Black Panther: Little Green Men. New York: Marvel. ISBN 978-0-785-12657-7. OCLC 191890888. – Contains material originally published in magazine form as Black Panther #31-34
- Hudlin, Reginald (writer); Neary, Paul (inks); Lashley, Ken (pencils) (2009). Black Panther: The Deadliest of the Species. New York: Marvel. ISBN 978-0-785-13342-1. OCLC 765104721. – Collecting Black Panther #1-6
- Hudlin, Reginald (writer); Cowan, Denys (pencils) (2010). Captain America/Black Panther: Flags of Our Fathers. New York: Marvel Worldwide. ISBN 978-0-785-14401-4. OCLC 780283834.
- Maberry, Jonathan (writer); Hudlin, Reginald (writer); Conrad, Will (art) (2010). Black Panther: Power. New York: Marvel. ISBN 978-0-785-13861-7. OCLC 437299872. – Contains material originally published in magazine form as Black Panther #7-12
- Tarantino, Quentin (adapted from the original screenplay by); Hudlin, Reginald (adaptation); Guéra, R.M. (art by); Latour, Jason (art by); Cowan, Denys (art by); Žeželj, Danijel (art by); Floyd, John (art by) (2014). Django Unchained. New York: Vertigo. ISBN 978-1-401-24709-6. OCLC 877860979. – Originally published in single magazine form in Django Unchained #1-7
- Maberry, Jonathan (writer); Hudlin, Reginald (writer; Conrad, Will (artist); Eaton, Scot (artist); Moll, Shawn (artist); Gugliotta, Gianluca (artist) (2017). Black Panther: Doomwar. New York: Marvel Worldwide, Inc. ISBN 978-1-302-90416-6. OCLC 951950784. – Contains material originally published in magazine form as Doomwar #1-6

Selected writing

- Hudlin, Reginald (September 10, 2000). "If It's a Question of Money . . ". Los Angeles Times.
- Hudlin, Reginald (January 21, 2015). "'Django Unchained' Producer on 'Selma' Oscar Snubs: Did Voters Have "Racial Fatigue"? (Guest Column)". The Hollywood Reporter.

== See also ==
- Warrington Hudlin
- Black Panther

== Bibliography ==
- Alexander, George (2003). "Reginald Hudlin". Why We Make Movies: Black Filmmakers Talk About the Magic of Cinema. New York: Harlem Moon. ISBN 978-0-307-41959-0. OCLC 53445264.
- Donalson, Melvin Burke (2003). "Chapter 9: Not Without Laughter: Directors of Comedy and Romance, Chapter 10: Off the Hook: Comedy and Romance with a Hip-Hop Flavor". Black Directors in Hollywood. Austin: University of Texas Press. pp. 204–277. ISBN 978-0-292-79875-5. OCLC 55731956.
- Gates, Jr., Henry Louis (2005). "Independent Means: Reginald Hudlin". America Behind the Color Line: Dialogues with African Americans. New York: Warner Books. ISBN 978-0-446-69390-5. OCLC 57551433.
- Eichenbaum, Rose (2014). "Reginald Hudlin". In Hirt-Manheimer, Aron (ed.). The Director Within: Storytellers of Stage and Screen. Middletown, CT: Wesleyan University Press. pp. 82–90. ISBN 978-0-819-57494-7. OCLC 893600248.
- SDCC 2015 Spotlight On Reginald Hudlin: Part 1 (Video). Hudlin Entertainment. August 31, 2015 – via Comic-Con International. "Part 2". "Part 3". "Part 4". "Part 5".
