= David Sheffield =

American comedy writer (born 1948)

- Born: 1948 (age 77–78); Mississippi, U.S.
- Occupations: Screenwriter; television writer

David Sheffield (born 1948) is an American comedy writer best known for his writing on Saturday Night Live (SNL) and the screenplays for Coming to America (1988), Coming 2 America (2021), and The Nutty Professor (1996) all written in collaboration with Barry W. Blaustein, and starring Eddie Murphy.

== Writing credits ==
- Saturday Night Live (1980-1983) (TV)
- Police Academy 2: Their First Assignment (1985)
- Coming to America (1988)
- What's Alan Watching? (1989) (TV)
- Boomerang (1992)
- The Nutty Professor (with Tom Shadyac and Steve Oedekerk) (1996)
- The Gelfin (1999) (unproduced)
- Nutty Professor II: The Klumps (with Paul Weitz and Chris Weitz (screenplay), Steve Oedekerk (story)) (2000)
- The Honeymooners (with Danny Jacobson and Don Rhymer) (2005)
- Coming 2 America (with Kenya Barris) (2021)
