= Interest convergence =

Principle on social change

Interest convergence is a principle that suggests that social change for minority groups occurs when their interests align with those of the majority. This shared interest can lead to the creation of new laws and policies. The theory was first coined by Derrick Bell. Bell was an American lawyer, theorist and civil rights activist in the 1970s. Bell argued that when fighting for racial justice, advocates will only be successful when their aim aligns with the needs and desires of privileged white people in society. The theory of interest convergence suggests that because racism is beneficial to white people they have little incentive to eradicate it. Using the lens of interest convergence, critical race theorists argued that both civil rights gains and changing attitudes towards people of colour regularly coincided with changing needs and desires of white people.

== Background ==
=== Brown v Board of Education ===
The idea of interest convergence came to Bell after considering Supreme Court decisions involving racial matters. Many of these cases were argued on the basis of the Equal Protection Clause of the 14th Amendment. The 14th Amendment states “[n]o State shall make or enforce any law which shall abridge the privileges or immunities of citizens of the United States”. In Plessy v. Ferguson, the Supreme Court confirmed the “separate but equal doctrine”, stating that racially segregated facilities were not illegal, providing the facilities were equal for both Black and white people. Scholars argue that this decision allowed policymakers to create rules that discriminated against Black students. The landmark decision of Brown v. Board of Education overturned Plessy. The Supreme Court held that segregated schools violated the 14th amendment and injured Black children. The change in approach by the Supreme Court led Bell to question their reasoning.

=== Response to Brown v Board of Education ===
The response to the decision was mixed. Many white people were horrified by the decision, describing the day the decision was handed down as a “Black Monday”. The Black community and its allies viewed the decision as the “crown jewel of US Supreme Court jurisprudence”. In the years that followed, people began to question the decision. Bell looked to the political climate at the time to substantiate his theory. Brown was decided in 1954. The Korean War had just ended and the Second World War had come to an end also. During these wars, Black people fought alongside their white counterparts. Many considered it unlikely they would willingly return to a position of inferiority in US society. Bell also considered the Cold War tensions at the time as likely motivation for the decision. Many US officials feared that their fight against communism would be unsuccessful when countries such as Russia could criticise America for the racial violence occurring in the US. Bell considered the political needs of white people and the equality needs of black people as a common ground. His claims were initially met with outrage.

==== Report of Mary Dudziak ====
Bell’s theory was backed up by legal historian Mary Dudziak. Dudziak studied official Government documents from the Justice Department that confirmed the fears of the US government regarding the spread of communism. She also discovered secret cables to the Justice Department outlining the United States’ interest in “improving its images in the eyes of the Third World”. In the wake of the decision, instructions were made to broadcast the decision to Russia and China.

==== Effects of Brown ====
Bell argues that interest convergence can be seen clearly in the state of Black education today. Followers of the interest convergence theory suggest that Black education hasn’t improved because Brown was not decided for their benefit. Decisions made in the aftermath of Brown decided that desegregation should be carried out as fast as possible. Leaving this matter to lower federal courts led to “local, judicial and political evasion of desegregation”. The treatment of the “Little Rock Nine” is an example of this. Studies done on schooling after the Brown decision show that many Black educators were fired and many Black students had to attend schools where they were “subjected to physical violence and emotional abuse, racial intimidation and hostility and illegal suspensions”.

== Principles ==
=== Limited Success ===
Because decisions made through interest convergence aren’t made specifically to benefit minority groups, adherents question the success of the results of these decisions.

According to Harvard Law Review, Brown’s failure is because the decision was never really made to benefit Black people. Interest convergence asserts that even if the interests of Black people are in theory protected by the 14th Amendment, that alone will not suffice to achieve justice if doing so will threaten the status of whites. Bell argues that even in situations where white people may support the decision based on equality alone, their numbers are not enough to bring out reform, without the converging interest of the majority group. Bell looked at interest convergence as a “two-sided coin”. On one side, political and legal achievements for Black people would only occur where they coincided with those of white people, and on the other hand, these achievements will be taken away if they threaten the interests of whites.

Scholars cite studies conducted to show the effect of interest convergence in education which found that white students still attend schools that are predominantly white, and Black and Latinx students attend predominantly non-white schools. This report also showed that the schools white students attend tend to receive vastly better resources that give white students educational advantages over other students who attend schools where the resources and standard of education is seriously lacking.

=== Decisions Made Solely for the Interests of Black People are Impossible ===
After Bell’s observation in Brown, believers in interest convergence looked back at previous Black advancements to see if it had been used in other decisions. Bell considered the abolition of slavery in the North as a move that would benefit white businessmen who were struggling with their slaves, and white labourers who did not want to have to compete with slaves for work. The Civil Rights Act of 1964 came about as a result of grassroots efforts that demanded social change from political leaders. The demonstrations and protests that ensued created a situation of political insecurity for policy makers, who rushed to create proposals that would ban segregation. Affirmative action cases have also been considered in this area. An affirmative action case decided in 2003 was initially viewed as a “slam-dunk victory”. Theorists analysed the reasoning of the judges in these decisions and argued that decisions are most likely to be successful when the court focuses on the benefits affirmative action would have for academic institutions instead of the benefits it would have on Black students.

=== Interest Convergence Applies to all Minority Groups ===
Though interest convergence originated from a decision involving Black people, scholars have expanded the study to other minority groups. In Hernandez v Texas, the court found that Latinos could sue for breaches of their civil rights. Theorists acknowledged that the decision was not as appreciated by ordinary Latinex people as it was by legal scholars. In this case the court found that Mexicans were a “distinct” and “segregated” group, and that systematic exclusion of Mexicans from the jury was unconstitutional. Using interest convergence, some theorists believe that the fight against communism is what motivated this decision. At the time that Hernandez was decided, policymakers and government officials in the US were worried about the spread of communism into Latin America. In their view, activism and publicising regarding the plight of Latinx people in the US at the time was a cause of worry to government officials, who feared the US image would be at risk because of this.

Critical theorists argue that interest convergence can be seen from Congress’s favourable response to Japanese-American reparations in the wake of Japanese internment. They argue that the Reagan Administration was implementing pro-Japan trade policies, yet feared that the treatment of Japanese people by America would hinder effective economic relations. Interest convergence has also been said to influence US treatment of Muslims. At his 2016 State of the Union address, President Obama claimed that attitudes towards Muslims must change because Islamophobia “diminishes us in the eyes of the world”.

== Influence ==
The study of interest convergence began in the area of education, but today scholars use it to study immigration, criminal justice, and affirmative action.

=== Immigration ===
Critical theorists have used interest convergence to study US immigration policy. Scholars argue that US laws have excluded various groups from entering the country based on race or nationality from the late 1800s. These restrictions include the Chinese exclusion laws of the 1880s and the national origin quota system which was dropped in 1965. Theorists argue that when restrictions are lifted on certain groups of people, it is based on political concerns and not humanitarian ones. One of the areas they consider is Mexican immigration. In their view, times when Mexicans were permitted to enter into the US coincided with the needs of the US labour market. Similarly, theorists argue that the US often used their refugee policy to discredit communist countries during the Cold War period by readily accepting refugees from these countries. With Asian immigrants, it is argued that Chinese Exclusion laws were abolished to keep the Chinese as an ally during World War 2.

=== Criminal Justice ===
Interest convergence is also used within the realm of criminal justice. Critical race theorists argue that mass incarceration, police violence, and mandatory sentences have disproportionate negative effects on people of colour. In their view, the humanitarian concerns of minority groups and economic concerns of the majority form a common ground that could lead to policy change in this area. Similarly, campaigners trying to abolish the death penalty proved to be more successful when they framed it as an economic issue, rather than a racial justice one.

=== Affirmative Action ===
Affirmative action is a highly contentious issue in the US that has received significant backlash in recent years. Theorists argue that any progress made regarding affirmative action involves the hope that it will benefit white people. They doubt the efficacy of affirmative action for minority groups, considering it was “created neither by them or for them”, but for the benefits that restoring social order and alleviating racial tensions would have for white people. With this view, discussions about the positives of affirmative action revolve around the benefits that introducing students of colour into academic institutions would have on white students.

== Critiques ==
Many people strongly criticise the theory. One criticism is the lack of agency the theory affords to Black people, or people who have fought to achieve justice. This group argues that Bell’s theory characterises Black people as completely inoperative in their fight for justice, despite significant involvement in campaigning, advocacy and protests. Thinkers in this field also disagree with the lack of compliment interest convergence would give to Black success. They argue that interest convergence takes away Black success by attributing it to a converging white interest. Additionally, supporters of this view argue that interest convergence minimises the actions of white judges who used their role to reject racism. Another critique views the theory’s usage of “black interests” and “white interests” as overly simplistic and not acknowledging the complexities of racial justice. In their view, there is no singular “black interest”, therefore decisions based on interest convergence may benefit some Black people, but not all. The theory is also criticised because it doesn’t acknowledge that decisions could be made in a racially egalitarian way. Critics argue that virtually every decision could affirm the existence of interest convergence if scrutinised heavily.

Some people use interest convergence as a tool to make progress in today’s world. These people believe that interest convergence can be used to fight racial inequality by creating “multiracial coalitions”. Cashin argues that it is unremarkable that groups of people act in their favour, even if it is to the detriment of others, and therefore, common interests should be used as a way to advance change.

== Subfields ==
Some supporters have taken interest convergence outside the realm of race and have applied it to animal welfare. Animal advocates are using health concerns surrounding meat eating, such as cancer and antibiotics in livestock, as a way to encourage people to stop eating meat.

Advocates for battered women are analysing the interests of Black and white women to ascertain whether there are converging interests that will further the rights of Black women suffering from domestic violence.
