= The Space Traders =

Short story by Derrick Bell

- Short story by Derrick Bell
- Country: United States
- Language: English
- Genres: Science fiction, short story

Publication
- Media type: Print
- Publication date: 1992

"The Space Traders" is a science fiction short story by Derrick Bell. As a short story, was published in 1992. However it originated in a different form under the title "The Chronicles of the Space Traders" as part of his 1989 speeches republished twice in law journals in 1989 and 1990. It was republished in the year of its setting in the 2000 edition of Dark Matter.

The story was adapted for television in 1994 as part of the anthology Cosmic Slop.

== Plot summary ==
On January 1, 2000, extraterrestrials arrive on Earth and offer the United States gold, safe nuclear power, and other technological advances in exchange for all of its Black citizens. They require a decision by January 17, Martin Luther King Jr. Day. Gleason Golightly, a prominent Black conservative, participates in the cabinet's discussion of the proposed trade. Golightly, ordinarily an "Uncle Tom" on racial matters, is adamantly against the trade for moral reasons. The completely White cabinet discounts his moral objections because they believe the trade will fix the United States' practical environmental and economic problems.

Later, Golightly attends a meeting of Black community members. He suggests that if Black people pretend that they are getting the best part of the deal, White people will oppose it out of envy and claim reverse discrimination. A preacher responds that Golightly's understanding of White psychology has merit, but he cannot go along with such a cynical ploy, and the group votes instead for boycotts and protests.

A prominent group of American Jews forms the "Anne Frank Committee," intending to smuggle Blacks out of the country before the trade. The FBI publishes the names of the Committee's members and they are forced into hiding themselves.

A Constitutional amendment is proposed, authorizing Congress to induce Blacks into "special service," with language modeled on the WWI Selective Service Act. State referendums on the amendment are scheduled. The Supreme Court rejects several legal challenges to the referendum process, citing as precedent the majority opinion in Giles v. Harris (1903). White televangelists line up in favor of the trade, while businesses dependent on racial exploitation oppose it.

On the final day, the constitutional referendum is held. The trade is approved by a 70/30 margin. The Black population of the United States (including Golightly himself) are rounded up by the military and sent into the extraterrestrials' ships. The ships are emptied of the promised gold, minerals and machinery, and then filled with 20 million Black men, women, and children - stripped down to a single undergarment and bound by thin chains.

== Television adaptation ==
The story was adapted for television in 1994 by director Reginald Hudlin and writer Trey Ellis as part of the HBO made-for-TV anthology film Cosmic Slop. Robert Guillaume starred as Golightly and Ronald Reagan impersonator Jay Koch played the space trader spokesman, described in the story as sounding like Reagan.

In the adaptation, there is a shorter five day deadline for the trade offer, and it is conducted by phone vote. The ending shows the black population departing via a beam of light with only one carry-on bag. In this version, Golightly's wife attempts to leave with her family, but is forced to stay by the military as she is light-skinned.

== Criticism and controversy ==
Judge Alex Kozinski has criticized the story as being a sign of how Bell's philosophy precludes discourse, citing the example of how in the story, American Jews would only help Black people out of a desire not to be the lowest social group in the US.

In the run-up to the 2012 U.S. presidential election, the story became a vehicle for political controversy. In The Atlantic, Conor Friedersdorf replied, arguing that the story's critics "would do well to acknowledge that for many decades of American history, including years during Professor Bell's life, a majority of Americans would have voted in favor of trading blacks for fantastic wealth, unlimited energy, and an end to pollutants."

== See also ==
- Compromise of 1877
- Treaty of New Echota
