= The Funniest Man Dead or Alive =

- Also known as: Richard Pyror: The Funniest Man Dead or Alive
- Written by: Reginald Hudlin
- Directed by: Reginald Hudlin
- Starring: Various
- Original language: English

Production
- Producer: Abbie Kearse
- Running time: 30 minutes
- Budget: $150,000 (estimated)

Original release
- Network: BET
- Release: December 19, 2005

Richard Pryor: The Funniest Man Dead or Alive is a 2005 American documentary television film aired by BET about the life and influence of American comedian and actor Richard Pryor. The thirty-minute special featured commentary from a wide range of actors, comedians, musicians, politicians, and Pryor's own family members. It aired just nine days after his death.
