= Boomerang (1992 film) =

American romantic comedy directed by Reginald Hudlin

- Theatrical release poster
- Directed by: Reginald Hudlin
- Screenplay by: Barry W. Blaustein; David Sheffield
- Story by: Eddie Murphy
- Produced by: Brian Grazer; Warrington Hudlin
- Starring: Eddie Murphy; Halle Berry; Robin Givens; David Alan Grier; Martin Lawrence; Grace Jones; Geoffrey Holder; Eartha Kitt
- Cinematography: Woody Omens
- Edited by: Earl Watson; John Carter; Michael Jablow
- Music by: Marcus Miller
- Production companies: Imagine Entertainment; Eddie Murphy Productions
- Distributed by: Paramount Pictures
- Release date: July 1, 1992
- Running time: 117 minutes
- Country: United States
- Language: English
- Budget: $42 million
- Box office: $131 million

Boomerang is a 1992 American romantic comedy film directed by Reginald Hudlin. The film stars Eddie Murphy as Marcus Graham, a hotshot advertising executive who also happens to be an insatiable womanizer and male chauvinist. When he meets his new boss, Jacqueline Broyer (Robin Givens), Marcus discovers that she is essentially a female version of himself, and he realizes he is receiving the same treatment that he delivers to others. The film also features Halle Berry, David Alan Grier, Martin Lawrence, Grace Jones, John Canada Terrell and Eartha Kitt.

Murphy assisted in developing the story with writers Barry W. Blaustein and David Sheffield, having worked with the writing duo since his days on Saturday Night Live. Murphy hired Hudlin to direct Boomerang, following the latter's success with his debut film House Party (1990). Hudlin and the writers aimed to create a romantic comedy that differed strongly from Murphy's previous comic efforts. Filming took place mainly in New York City, while other scenes were filmed in Washington, D.C.

The film was released in the United States by Paramount Pictures on July 1, 1992, and was the 18th highest-grossing film in North America that year. Boomerang earned over $131 million worldwide during its theatrical run. The film garnered nominations at the BMI Film & TV Awards and the MTV Movie Awards, while its soundtrack became a top-selling album. Entertainment Weekly called it an underrated classic and one of the best Eddie Murphy movies of the 1990s. A 2019 television series based on the film, also called Boomerang, premiered on February 12, 2019, on BET.

== Plot ==
Advertising executive Marcus Graham is a serial womanizer, prone to lying to seduce women but unwilling to commit until he finds the "perfect woman." His friends Tyler and Gerard tell him his standards are too high, particularly his habit of judging women by their feet.

Marcus's company is acquired by cosmetics mogul Lady Eloise, who invites him to her home with amorous intentions; he spends the night with her, believing he will be promoted. The next day, he meets Jacqueline Broyer, who has been made head of his department instead. At a party to celebrate the merger, eccentric fashion diva Helen Strangé is announced as the new face of the company, and Jacqueline introduces Marcus to colleague Angela Lewis, whom he sets up with Gerard. Though they get along fine, Angela and Gerard learn that they're better as friends.

Despite his best efforts, Marcus is unable to woo Jacqueline. Over dinner at his apartment, she ignores his advances and is more interested in the basketball game on TV, leaving him frustrated. On a business trip to New Orleans, Jacqueline unexpectedly invites Marcus into her room, and they have sex. Afterward, he is relieved to find her feet up to his standards.

Marcus begins to fall for Jacqueline, but finds himself on the receiving end of his usual tactics: she ignores his feelings, manipulates him with sex, and keeps their relationship strictly on her terms. Discovering she has bragged about their trysts to Strangé, whose advances he is forced to reject, Marcus confronts Jacqueline, and she ends their affair. Marcus finds himself the subject of office gossip, and his work begins to suffer. After a major business proposal is almost ruined, Jacqueline forces Marcus to take a few paid weeks off as an alternative to being fired.

Marcus spends time with Angela, a friend of Gerard, who tries to bring him out of his funk. He realizes he's developing feelings for her when they bond over watching late night reruns of Star Trek. After hosting Thanksgiving dinner with Tyler, Gerard, and Gerard's tactless parents, Marcus and Angela sleep together. Gerard is furious, believing Marcus will mistreat Angela like his past conquests. They move in together, but she is hurt when he downplays their relationship in a phone call with Jacqueline. Marcus, having regained his confidence, proves newly attractive to Jacqueline, and they sleep together again.

Marcus returns home to Angela in the middle of the night, and when she confronts him in the morning, he explains that he is confused by his feelings for her and for Jacqueline. She breaks up with him and takes a promotion at another company. Marcus rebounds with Jacqueline, but realizes his love for Angela; he returns home to find she has moved out. Marcus reconciles with Gerard, and visits Angela at her new job, convincing her that he is truly committed to her, and they get back together.

== Cast ==
- Eddie Murphy as Marcus Graham
- Robin Givens as Jacqueline Broyer
- Halle Berry as Angela Lewis
- David Alan Grier as Gerard Jackson
- Martin Lawrence as Tyler Hawkins
- Grace Jones as Helen Strangé
- Geoffrey Holder as Nelson
- Eartha Kitt as Lady Eloise
- Chris Rock as Bony T
- Tisha Campbell as Yvonne
- Lela Rochon as Christie
- John Canada Terrell as Todd
- John Witherspoon as Mr. Jackson
- Bebe Drake as Mrs. Jackson
- Leonard Jackson as Lloyd - Chemist

== Production ==
=== Development ===
Eddie Murphy created the original idea for the film, which he took to writers Barry Blaustein and David Sheffield, both of whom he had been working with during his days at Saturday Night Live. After they finished the first draft of the script and were given the greenlight on the project, Murphy offered the directing job to Reginald Hudlin, who had previously found critical and commercial success with his debut film House Party. For Boomerang, Hudlin said that, from a creative standpoint, he really wanted to take Murphy "somewhere where he's never been before," and that he and the writers' goal was to "put Eddie through paces. To have him have an arc like most characters in movies do, where he's not just the Br'er Rabbit character starting trouble," and to put him in a situation that "allows him to have a genuine obstacle."

Woody Omens, the cinematographer of the film, was insisted upon by Murphy, who had previously worked with him on Harlem Nights. Earl Watson worked as the film's main editor, and had previously worked with Hudlin on House Party. Francine Jamison-Tanchuck worked as the film's costume designer.

The intention was to give Murphy's character Marcus Graham a cool, yet sophisticated style. "So typically when it comes to black characters, either you have to be a successful, smart business person, or you're hip, but you're never both," said Hudlin. "And one of the reasons why the movie has had such enduring popularity is because the character is both. He's much more in the Cary Grant mode of business person." While working on the characterization of the main character, Hudlin came up with the foot gag, which was used as a plot device to show the arc of the character's growth. It originated from a joke between the director and his friends about a man who's so picky about women that he even looks at their back teeth. "So it's like, how do we define that Eddie's a back teeth kind of guy? So I came upon the idea of showing feet. That no matter how beautiful this woman is, if she has messed up feet, he's out of there." Also, Hudlin said that "we know he's evolved into a higher level of consciousness when he doesn't even notice what Halle Berry's feet look like." The character Angela's art class was an idea the filmmakers had to put Murphy in a context where he could interact with kids, which he hadn't done prior to this film.

The cast rehearsed for two weeks before production started, which the director said "really created that sense of team, and everyone playing off each other and everyone having that comfort level." Murphy even told Hudlin that he hadn't rehearsed since his days at SNL, and that he was going to rehearse for all of his movies from then on.

The scene in which Marcus changes his mind while with Jacqueline was a major rewrite to the script. According to Hudlin, in the original draft, Eddie's character Marcus

never decides anything, things are decided for him by the different women. So, we finally realized he had to make an affirmative choice. Going through the script with a buddy of mine, we talked about it, and my buddy Tre said "look, he's got to make a decision." And I said, "you're right. He's got to reject her, and choose her." And it seems so obvious now, I'm like "what's wrong with me? What was wrong with all of us that it took us so long to figure out what we really needed to do to fix the movie?"

=== Casting ===
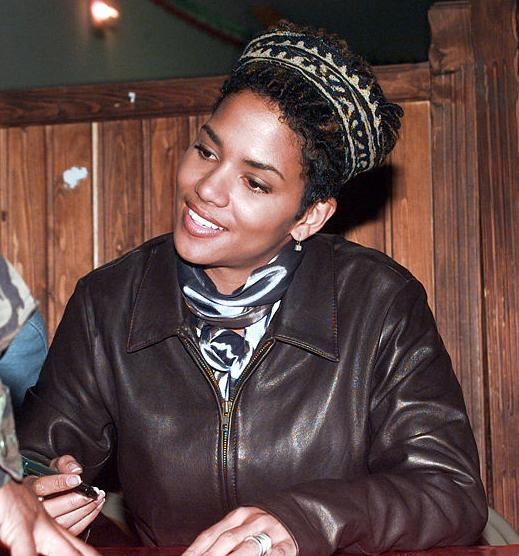
Halle Berry was cast as Angela.

Hudlin knew immediately that he wanted Halle Berry for the role of Angela after she came in and did the reading, and was nervous that Murphy wouldn't like her. Berry had appeared in a couple of films prior to being cast in Boomerang. However, after Berry performed her screen test, Murphy told Hudlin "well, that's it. There's no need to see the other two actresses because she's the part." Executives at Paramount Pictures were nervous about Robin Givens being cast in such a major role in the film, as she was disliked by many in the general public at the time because of her past relationship with Mike Tyson. Hudlin however, "thought that actually made her perfect for the role, that she was this formidable person, and a match for Eddie Murphy, who also had an intrepid reputation as a ladies' man. So, I wanted the audience to feel like this would be a fair fight."

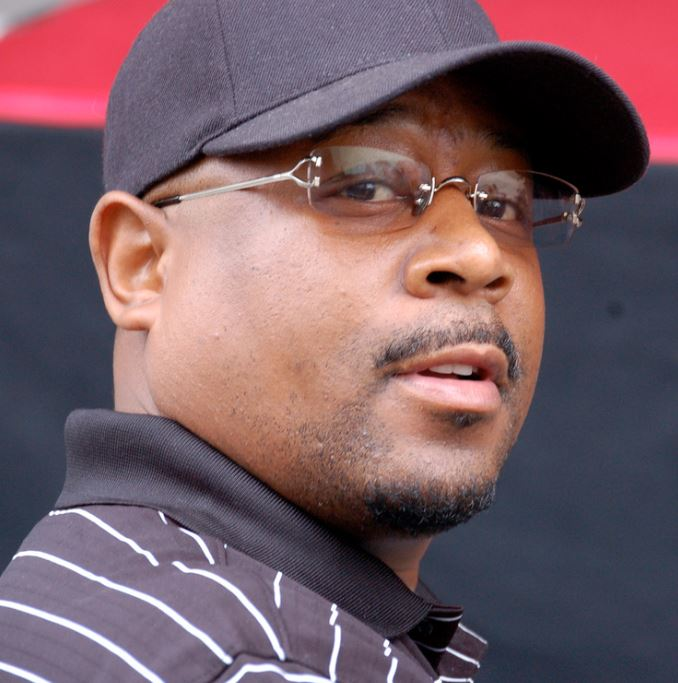
Martin Lawrence

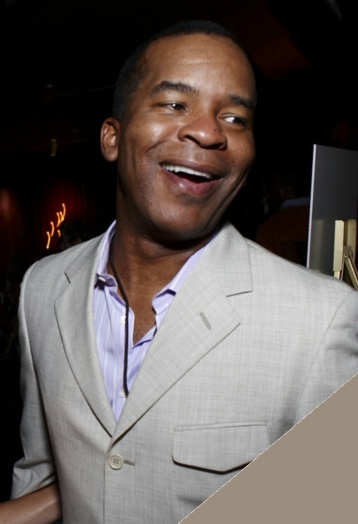
David Alan Grier

David Alan Grier and Martin Lawrence were cast as Murphy's best friends in the film. At the time, Grier was well known for the show In Living Color. About him, Hudlin said, "I think he is an absolutely underrated genius. I think he is Steve Martin-level funny, and it's too bad more people don't know how to use his comic gift, because he is absolutely brilliant." Lawrence was brought on to the project after first working with Hudlin on House Party, which was his first major role in a film. Bebe Drake-Massey and John Witherspoon had played a couple in House Party, and were reunited for the film, this time playing the character Gerard's parents. Tisha Campbell also worked with Hudlin on House Party, and was brought on board to play Murphy's obnoxious, and somewhat obsessive, neighbor. While on the set, Hudlin would always rave about Campbell and Lawrence, and Murphy suggested Hudlin do a film with the two of them. Lawrence, who was developing his television show at the time, overheard the two actors talking, and decided to cast Campbell as his girlfriend and later wife, Gina, for his hit sitcom Martin.

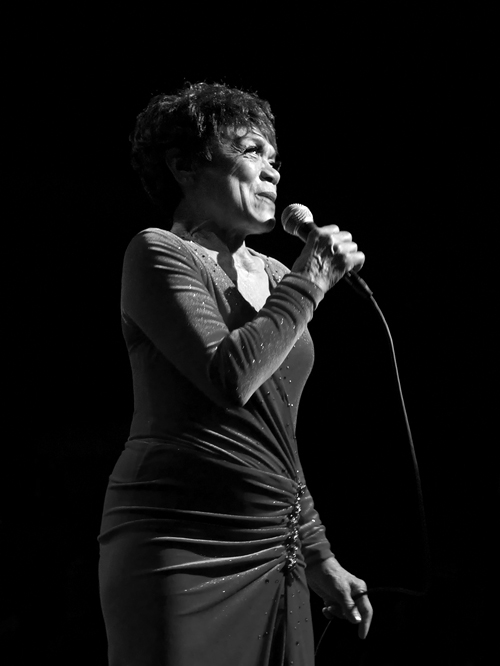
Eartha Kitt

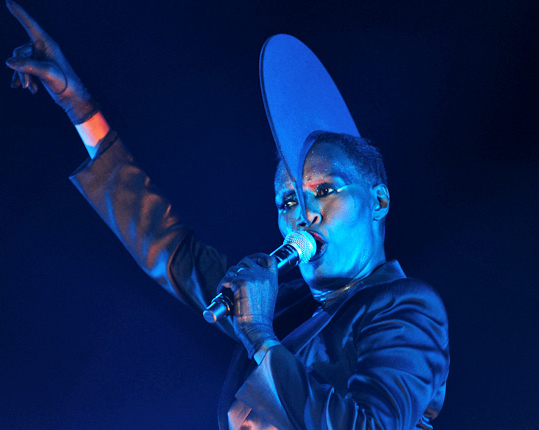
Grace Jones

Grace Jones was cast in a role that was essentially written as a parody of herself. Of her work ethic, Hudlin said that "she was always 100% committed, and would do the absolute craziest thing at any given time. She was absolutely perfect for the role. It was written for her, and she came in very humble, very sweet."

Eartha Kitt was the hardest person to cast for the film, as she was somewhat offended by her character's tone in the original script. Eventually she accepted the role, after some of the more tasteless jokes in the script were changed or removed. Hudlin however did say that "she was great to work with," and that "she really got into the spirit of it, and was a lot of fun."

Lela Rochon, who was known for her role in Murphy's 1989 film Harlem Nights, was brought back for a small role in Boomerang. Chris Rock, who was a protege of Murphy's, and had acted in small roles in a few other films at the time, was also given a bit part. The role of Lady Eloise's butler was played by Jonathan Hicks, a friend of the director's, who replaced a sick actor at the last minute. Hicks was a reporter for The New York Times, not an actor, and took the role as a favor to Hudlin.

Three of the actors in this film have starred in the James Bond 007 films. This includes Geoffrey Holder (Baron Samedi from the film Live and Let Die), Grace Jones (May Day from the film A View to a Kill), and Halle Berry (Giacinta "Jinx" Johnson from the film Die Another Day).

=== Filming ===
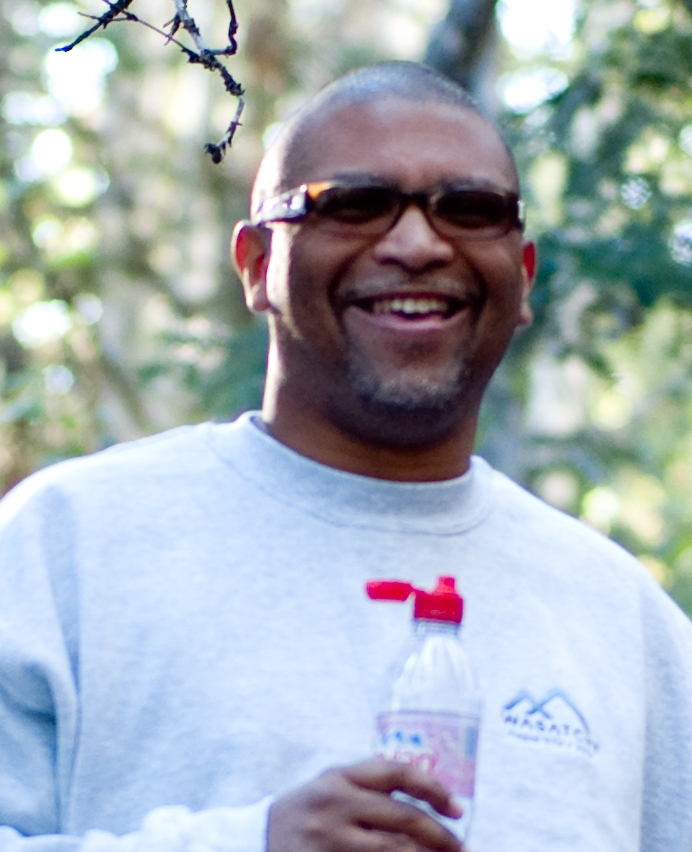
Director Reginald Hudlin

The majority of the film was shot in New York City during the winter. Although it was very cold, the director said that it was still "great to actually be in the city and get that authentic New York flavor." Most of the film was done on location as well. Interior scenes which took place at Marcus' workplace were shot in the old Univision building that had been repainted for production. The scene in Lady Eloise's bedroom was shot at the Boston Park Plaza, in a suite personally redesigned by Ivana Trump, which accounts for the unique styling. The scene of Strangé's introduction was filmed at the Winter Garden Atrium of Brookfield Place.

Although director Hudlin was willing to let his actors improvise, there were boundaries and rules to it, so that the jokes wouldn't lead to nowhere. He explained that once the actors "get a sense that someone will tell them if something doesn't work, or that we're getting too far afield, then they feel comfortable doing what they do. So, that's the balance that we struck."

Production went well, and as expected with so many comic actors and personalities around, was lively. During production, Hudlin said that whenever David Alan Grier and Martin Lawrence worked, the film's crew usually worked a little slower because wherever they were, there would be so much comedy being generated and they were so funny that everyone wanted to hang out near where they were throughout the day. In the scene where the new fragrance is being presented to Strangé, the director said that "what Grace was doing on the set while we were shooting was so funny that I remember Halle crying off camera, cause she was trying to keep a straight face but she couldn't. So whenever she was off-camera, she would just be literally crying because she was laughing so hard. And fortunately, for her reaction shots she was able to recover."

An extra scene, involving Jones taking off her chain-metal dress which is ringing off the metal detectors and walking through them naked, was shot in Newark Airport. However, the filmmakers felt it to be too shocking, to the point where it threw the rhythm of the picture off, so they only used it in the small clip being edited for the approved perfume commercial.

The scene late in the film where Grier, Lawrence, and Murphy hug in front of the Empire State Building was shot around one or two o'clock in the morning, when the lights are usually shut off. If the filmmakers had them shut off at their command, it would have cost them $40,000–$60,000, so instead Hudlin had the three hug, and the lights were eventually shut off as usual. When editing the film, they simply reversed the footage to make it appear as if the lights were being turned on. The filmmakers even thought about ending the movie at this point, deciding instead to go with Marcus attempting to win back Angela's affection. For this, an alternate ending was shot where Angela is teaching the kids at the school and Marcus comes, talks to her and eventually wins her back; the filmmakers thought it was slow and uninteresting, and eventually came up with the released version.

Near the production's end, some scenes that still needed to be shot were done in Washington, D.C., where Murphy was also shooting The Distinguished Gentleman. Originally, some of the film was to take place in the Caribbean, and scenes were to be shot there. However, the setting was changed to New Orleans, and the scenes taking place there were shot in D.C.

=== Music ===
Marcus Miller produced the original score for the film, while Antonio "L. A." Reid and Kenneth "Babyface" Edmonds worked on the soundtrack. With such a wealth of new material, director Hudlin said

Sometimes we used score, sometimes we'd use a song by L.A. and Face, or sometimes Marcus would take some of the songs they had written and do score interpolations of it. For example, one of the songs, "Love Shoulda Brought You Home", is a great example. That came from a line of dialogue where Halle is furious with Eddie, says "love should've brought your ass home last night," slaps him. At that time, L.A. leans over to me and goes "that's a great song title." I said, "great idea." They write a song, "Love Shoulda Brought You Home". I said, "well, who we going to get to sing it?" And they said "well you know, we've got this great young singer who sang the demo, Reggie. If you like the demo then we can use her." And I said "great, let's use her." So that was Toni Braxton's debut. And I remember when I finally met Toni at Babyface's wedding, L.A. said, "you owe your career to this guy, he gave you your big break," which was really sweet.

The soundtrack album reached the number four spot on the Billboard 200, and number one on the Top R&B/Hip-Hop Albums chart. It included multiple singles that charted in their own right, the most successful of which was Boyz II Men's "End of the Road", which went to number one on the Billboard Hot 100 singles chart, and stayed there for thirteen weeks, breaking Elvis Presley's previous record of eleven weeks with his version of "Hound Dog".

=== Design ===
The production was very demanding, including an expensive wardrobe budget, which Hudlin felt was completely worth the price. "The clothing in the movie is incredible, for both the men and the women. Eddie looks great, Robin and Halle look great. Great hair, great makeup work for all concerned, cause we wanted it to look fantastic. We wanted to give people a level of production value they hadn't seen for Eddie's first foray into true romantic comedy."

=== Influences ===
François Truffaut's Jules and Jim was an influence on the story arc between the characters Angela, Gerard and Marcus. Hudlin explained, "I remember when I saw Jules and Jim when I was a kid, and that awkward, awkward feeling of two guys, one has a better time with girls than the other, and they both fall in love with the same woman. And I remember the agony of watching the emotional stakes of that picture. And, this is just a fun movie, not trying to compare myself to Truffaut on any level, but, at least, that's what inspired the moment."

The pacing and rhythm of Howard Hawks' His Girl Friday was a big influence on the picture's style. Woody Allen's Annie Hall was also very influential while Hudlin worked on the project because, according to Hudlin, "if you talk about contemporary romantic comedy, you're really talking about Annie Hall."

== Reception ==
=== Box office ===
On its opening weekend, the film earned $13,640,706, and ranked number three at the box office. It also ranked number three the two following weekends. By the end of its theatrical run, the film had grossed over $70 million domestically, and $61 million outside of the U.S., making a total of $131,052,444. It was the 18th highest-grossing film in the US in 1992. Compared to its budget, the film was considered a success.

=== Critical reception ===
On review aggregation website Rotten Tomatoes, the film holds an approval rating of 49%, based on 43 reviews, and an average rating of 5.3/10. The website's critics consensus reads, "Boomerang injects some fresh color into the corporate rom-com formula, but the frothy fun is undercut by off-putting gender dynamics and misjudged gags." On Metacritic, the film has a weighted average score of 45 out of 100, based on 19 critics, indicating "mixed or average" reviews. Audiences surveyed by CinemaScore gave the film a grade A− on scale of A to F.

Roger Ebert gave the film and its stars positive reviews, calling the movie "predictable but enjoyable all the same." In 2005, the film was ranked number 21 on BET's Top 25 Movies In the Last 25 Years list.

In retrospect, Kristen Baldwin from Entertainment Weekly said: "Though it never received the critical appreciation it deserved, and it is often overlooked in discussions of the rom-com pantheon today, Boomerang still holds up 27 years later."

About the critical response, Hudlin said:

There was one infamous review of the film that summed up the ignorance of many critics. The movie was called a science fiction film, because those writers didn’t know about any successful black companies. They didn’t know about Johnson Products, or Johnson Publishing, or Burrell Advertising, or UniWorld Advertising, or any black law firms or… They were just ignorant, which they tried to pass off as wit. It was also frustrating for (Eddie) because he was stretching out, expanding the range of movies he was doing, but instead of applauding him for doing something different, they sneered. So many people love the film, from Lena Horne to Ice Cube. There are people who watch it with their family every Thanksgiving. But there was this crazy generation gap between the white people who ran Hollywood at the time the film was made, and the white people who grew up on hip hop who are players in Hollywood today. There's a much higher percentage of white executives who at least have a basic knowledge of black pop culture today, thank goodness. That’s why you can't sweat the controversy of the moment. Over time, the true value of a movie is revealed. Which is why it's so nice Boomerang has generations of fans.

About the legacy and the cult status of Boomerang, Eddie Murphy said: "I love that Boomerang has the legs it had. I love that it's still works... I'm proud of that film"

=== Awards and nominations ===
- 1993 BMI Film & TV Awards
  - Most Performed Song from a Film: Antonio "L.A." Reid, Daryl Simmons, and Kenneth "Babyface" Edmonds for "End of the Road" (winner)
- 1993 MTV Movie Awards
  - Best Breakthrough Performance: Halle Berry (nominated)
  - Best Comedic Performance: Eddie Murphy (nominated)
  - Best Movie Song: Boyz II Men, "End of the Road" (nominated)
  - Most Desirable Female: Halle Berry (nominated)

== See also ==
- Eddie Murphy filmography
