= Beyond the Mat =

1999 film by Barry W. Blaustein

- Theatrical release poster
- Directed by: Barry W. Blaustein
- Written by: Barry W. Blaustein
- Produced by: Barry W. Blaustein; Barry Bloom; Brian Grazer; Ron Howard; Michael Rosenberg
- Narrated by: Barry W. Blaustein
- Cinematography: Michael Grady
- Edited by: Jeff Werner
- Music by: Nathan Barr
- Production company: Imagine Entertainment
- Distributed by: Lions Gate Films
- Release date: October 22, 1999
- Running time: 102 minutes
- Country: United States
- Language: English
- Budget: $500,000
- Box office: $2 million

Beyond the Mat is a 1999 American documentary film directed, written, produced and narrated by Barry W. Blaustein. The film focuses on the lives of professional wrestlers outside of the ring, primarily Mick Foley, Terry Funk, and Jake Roberts, as well as some aspiring wrestlers. It focuses on the World Wrestling Federation (WWF), Extreme Championship Wrestling (ECW) during its rise in popularity, and many other independent wrestlers and organizations. The film was originally released by Lions Gate Films on October 22, 1999, and later on VHS and DVD.

== Synopsis ==
Director Barry Blaustein discusses his love for professional wrestling and clips of him viewing employees of the World Wrestling Federation and Extreme Championship Wrestling. He then decides to travel the United States over a three-year period, endeavoring to understand the mindset of someone who would voluntarily choose to become a professional wrestler. Blaustein interviews a wide variety of wrestling personalities and ascertains their motivations.

Blaustein focuses on three famous wrestlers, one at the height of his career (Mick Foley, aka "Mankind"), one contemplating retirement (Terry Funk) and one at a career low (Jake "The Snake" Roberts). He begins by following Funk, a 53-year-old man in need of knee surgery who appears unable to retire, despite the mounting toll wrestling is taking on his body. Blaustein follows him as he competes at hardcore wrestling promotion Extreme Championship Wrestling's first pay-per-view event Barely Legal in 1997. Funk also appears with his friend, former wrestler Dennis Stamp, who is eager to work as a referee in Funk's upcoming "retirement" match. Stamp discusses the fact that he has not wrestled in years, but remains in shape just in case he gets the call, and demonstrates his unusual workout regimen: jumping on a trampoline in his backyard while holding hand weights.

Funk's sometime in-ring rival, Foley, is profiled next. He has been taking increasingly risky falls (or "bumps") and blows to the head, and at one point is heard talking incoherently as the result of a fall (from his Hell in a Cell match against The Undertaker at King of the Ring 1998) which briefly rendered him unconscious. Clips of Foley with his wife and children are spliced with the clips of him risking his body for the sport. Later, in the film's climax, his wife and young children (particularly his daughter Noelle) watch in horror from the front of the audience during Foley's "I Quit" match at the 1999 Royal Rumble, wherein he takes multiple unprotected shots to the head by Dwayne "The Rock" Johnson with a steel folding chair. Four weeks after the match, Blaustein was haunted by seeing Foley's family reaction to the Royal Rumble match. Blaustein decided to show Foley and his wife the footage he captured at the event. After watching the footage, Foley admitted he felt guilty for putting his family through the ordeal, and said he never wanted to put them in that position again.

Lastly, Roberts is a wrestler whose height of popularity was in the 1980s. Now he is a crack cocaine addict, and estranged from his daughter. Although he was once one of the more famous wrestlers in America, performing in front of tens of thousands of fans, he is now wrestling in small-town venues. Arguably, the most iconic scene in the documentary is Roberts lighting up a post match cigarette and enjoying the taste of it. Also in the course of the film, Roberts is shown attempting to reconcile with his daughter and being interviewed after reportedly smoking crack cocaine in a hotel room (the act is not shown on camera), as well as musing aloud about his increasingly illicit sexual dalliances while traveling.

The careers of the three successful wrestlers are contrasted with those of wrestlers who have not yet achieved comparable success, such as two men getting started in the sport of wrestling, Tony Jones and Michael Modest, who are granted a tryout match for the WWF. In addition, Darren Drozdov is a former NFL football player who is shown in an interview with Vince McMahon. Drozdov, who can vomit at will, is called on by McMahon to vomit in a wastebasket as a demonstration of his ability—an ability which earned him the ring name "Puke"—which McMahon plans to use as part of Drozdov's new in-ring persona. Drozdov becomes a WWF wrestler, but at the end of the film, it is revealed that Droz was paralyzed in an in-ring accident from a botched maneuver several months later.

== Production and release ==
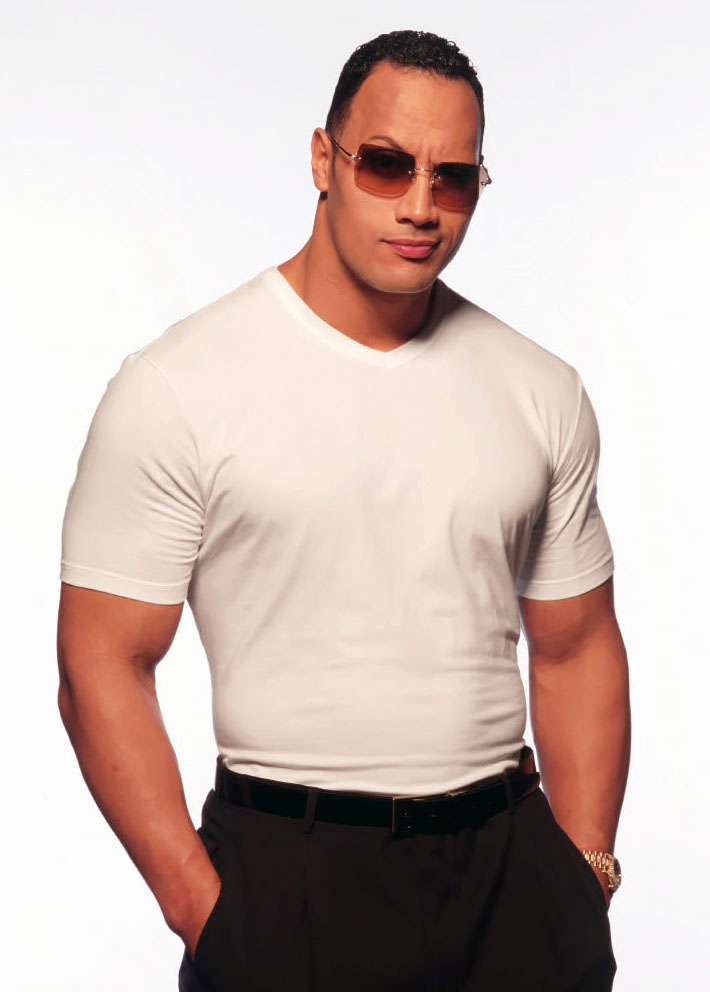
Dwayne Johnson made his first film appearance in Beyond the Mat

Barry W. Blaustein decided to make a documentary about professional wrestling after being outed as a professional wrestling fan. His original budget was $500,000, funded by the company Imagine Entertainment. He shot footage for the film over a span of three to five years.

World Championship Wrestling (WCW) refused to participate in the film. Blaustein approached the World Wrestling Federation (WWF) about involving the company in the film in 1997. WWF chairman Vince McMahon originally allowed Blaustein full access to behind-the-scenes aspects of his company, but later tried to pull out of the deal.

Jake Roberts has stated that he was informed the film would be used to help children, but that never transpired. Blaustein has stated the opposite. In response to why he thought Roberts made the allegations, Blaustein responded, "I don't know why. Jake's looking for publicity for himself, maybe. I don't know. He has problems with reality. I wish Jake all the best."

Beyond the Mat was released in theaters in the United States in March 2000. The film was later released on DVD, including extra footage and cast interviews. An unrated director's cut edition dubbed Special Ringside Edition was released on DVD in March 2004. This version featured a new introduction and additional footage, as well as an interview with Foley and Jesse Ventura.

== Response ==
=== Critics ===
Beyond the Mat has an 82% "Fresh" rating on Rotten Tomatoes, based on 67 reviews. Its consensus reads: "Even if you aren't a fan, Beyond the Mat provides a riveting, perceptive look into the world of professional wrestling by taking a closer look at the people beneath the personas."

Lisa Schwarzbaum of Entertainment Weekly rated the film a B−, stating that "Beyond the Mat is entirely dependent on, and shaped by, the good stuff the director happens to get, rather than driven by hard questions a journalist might want answered." Paul Tatara of CNN wrote, "Blaustein seems to think that he's humanizing these guys by showing how "normal" they are out of the ring, but he unintentionally makes their penchant for self-mutilation all the more inexplicable. There are a couple of laughs in the movie, but the overall effect is much more depressing than it is humorous."

The film was named Best Documentary at the Cinequest Film Festival, and was also nominated by the Director's Guild Association for best documentary and best director. The book The 100 Best Movies You've Never Seen includes Beyond the Mat in its list, declaring that it "works on an almost Shakespearean level."

=== Wrestling industry ===
After viewing the film, McMahon removed all advertising for it from WWF broadcasts. As a result, Lions Gate Films, the film's distributor, considered filing a lawsuit for restraint of trade. Spokespeople for the WWF, however, stated that advertising was pulled because of a policy against advertising for other wrestling companies or ventures. Blaustein also stated that McMahon ordered his wrestlers, including Mick Foley, not to speak about the film publicly. Foley, however, did appear on Larry King Live with Blaustein to help promote the film. As a result, the tagline of the movie became "The Movie Vince McMahon Didn't Want You to See!".

Roddy Piper also appeared with Blaustein on Larry King Live to discuss the professional wrestling business. He called the movie, "the best documentary ever made on professional wrestling." Likewise, Hulk Hogan expressed an interest in appearing in the next wrestling documentary should Blaustein make one.

In June 2011, Blaustein was a guest on the "Review a Wai’' podcast with John Pollock and Wai Ting, in which he discussed the problems of putting the documentary together with Vince McMahon's blessing. Blaustein also revealed that after the first viewing, it was Linda McMahon who was more upset than Vince, due to the documentary's portrayal of the company, and a lack of emphasis on the "fun" in professional wrestling.

=== Fate of the wrestlers profiled ===
In the years after the film was released, the three wrestlers primarily profiled continued their lives largely on the same path. Foley retired from full-time competition in 2000, at age 34, due to health concerns related to his hardcore style of wrestling, as well as him and his wife Colette (who was featured in the film with their two older children) having two more children after the film was released. He had, however, wrestled on occasion afterward, but retired from in-ring competition in 2012. Foley was inducted into the WWE Hall of Fame on April 6, 2013, and maintains a relatively successful circuit of stand-up comedy and speaking tours. He is also a New York Times Best Seller author.

As the epilogue of the film mentioned, Funk's retirement lasted three months. Funk went on to participate in several more retirement matches, the most recent on September 22, 2017, at age 73. Along with his brother Dory Funk, Jr., Funk was inducted into the WWE Hall of Fame in 2009.

Roberts' drug and alcohol use increased after the film was released. In 2004, Roberts faced a charge of "causing unnecessary suffering" after his snake, "Damien", was allowed to starve to death in the garage of his London Colney home. In 2007, WWE initiated a policy to pay all expenses for any former WWWF/WWF/WWE performer who needed to enter into any form of drug rehabilitation. According to various wrestling news reports, as well as his own MySpace page, Roberts was placed in a 14-week voluntary rehab program by WWE as of December 10, 2007. In May 2008, Jim Ross reported that, "Jake Roberts has been doing well the past few weeks, after completing a treatment program." In 2012, Roberts moved in with fellow wrestler Diamond Dallas Page to receive help with getting his life back on track. In 2013, Scott Hall joined Roberts' rehabilitative efforts by also moving into Page's home, which has been nicknamed the "accountability crib". This is documented in the film The Resurrection of Jake the Snake.

At WrestleCon 2013, Roberts announced his desire to return to WWE as a participant in Royal Rumble 2014, which did not happen. However, on January 6, 2014, Roberts returned on WWE television for the first time in almost nine years, as a part of Old School Raw at the end of the CM Punk vs Roman Reigns match, bringing out a new snake with him (an Albino Burmese Python) and aiding The New Age Outlaws and Punk in fending off The Shield. Jake is doing well and enjoying his newfound sobriety, although he was diagnosed with skin cancer, for which he has undergone successful treatment. He was announced as the second entrant of WWE's 2014 Hall of Fame Class. He is currently signed with All Elite Wrestling.

In 2007, Jim Bell, the former Vice President of Merchandising for the WWF who featured in the film, was sentenced for trying to defraud the company almost $1 million from 1998 to 2002 through illegitimate kickbacks. He received an eight-month prison sentence and three years of probation.

In 2014, Dennis Stamp published a book about his wrestling days titled The Stamp Collection: A Collection of Short Stories from the World's Most Famous Unknown Wrestler. That year he also refereed a main event for Scottish Wrestling Entertainment.

In 2016, Stamp announced that his cancer had returned. He died of lymphoma on March 13, 2017, after which wrestlers including Ted DiBiase and Tommy Dreamer paid tribute to him on social media.

In November 2017, Stamp was posthumously inducted into the Amarillo Pioneer Hall of Fame by the local Amarillo Pioneer newspaper.

Darren "Droz" Drozdov died on June 30, 2023, in New Jersey.

Terry Funk died on August 23, 2023.

Tony Jones died in 2024.

== See also ==
- Hitman Hart: Wrestling with Shadows, another very well-received professional wrestling documentary from around the same period.
- Bloodstained Memoirs, a 2009 professional wrestling documentary.
- The Wrestler
- 1999 in film
