= The Honeymooners (2005 film) =

- Theatrical release poster
- Directed by: John Schultz
- Written by: Barry W. Blaustein; Danny Jacobson; David Sheffield; Don Rhymer
- Based on: The Honeymooners by Jackie Gleason
- Produced by: David T. Friendly; Eric Rhone; Julie Durk; Marc Turtletaub
- Starring: Cedric the Entertainer; Mike Epps; Gabrielle Union; Regina Hall; Eric Stoltz; John Leguizamo
- Cinematography: Shawn Maurer
- Edited by: John Pace
- Music by: Richard Gibbs
- Production companies: Deep River Productions; Friendly Films
- Distributed by: Paramount Pictures
- Release date: June 10, 2005
- Running time: 90 minutes
- Country: United States
- Language: English
- Budget: $25 million
- Box office: $13.2 million

The Honeymooners is a 2005 American comedy film directed by John Schultz. An updated version of the original 1950s television series of the same name, this adaptation stars a predominantly-African American cast featuring Cedric the Entertainer, Gabrielle Union, Mike Epps, and Regina Hall.

The film was both financially and critically unsuccessful, with Roger Ebert being one of the few to give it a positive review.

== Plot ==
The Kramdens and the Nortons are working-class neighbors; bus-driver Ralph Kramden (Cedric the Entertainer) and sewer worker Ed Norton (Mike Epps) are best friends. Ralph is constantly masterminding get-rich-quick schemes with which Ed tries to help. The driving force behind them is their wives, Alice Kramden (Gabrielle Union) and Trixie Norton (Regina Hall); the men are trying to make enough money to afford the homes they think they and their wives deserve. Meanwhile, Alice and Trixie make ends meet by waitressing at the local diner.

== Cast ==
- Cedric the Entertainer as Ralph Kramden
- Mike Epps as Edward "Ed" Norton
- Gabrielle Union as Alice Kramden
- Regina Hall as Trixie Norton
- Carol Woods as Mama Gibson
- Doreen Keogh as Ms. Celestine
- Eric Stoltz as William Davis
- John Leguizamo as Dodge
- Jon Polito as Kirby
- Lenny Venito as Lenny
- Ajay Naidu as Vivek
- Kevin Corrigan as Larry
- Alice Drummond as Miss Benvenutti

== Production ==
In February 1993, it was reported that Savoy Pictures had acquired the rights to The Honeymooners from CBS Entertainment for development as a feature film adaptation to be produced by Frank Price in association with CBS. Leonard B. Stern, who wrote many scripts for the original series, was employed by Savoy as a consultant during the film's development. Damon Wayans had wanted to star in the film and unsuccessfully lobbied for the producers to make Ralph Kramden African American. Ultimately, Savoy selected Tom Arnold to play Ralph. The producers also planned to excise Ralph's catchphrase "Bang, zoom!" out of concern for changing attitudes towards domestic violence. Shooting had been planned to take place in 1996, but Arnold received a $4 million offer to star in a film version of McHale's Navy which led to the film stalling in development.

In April 2002, it was reported that producers David T. Friendly and Marc Turtletaub of Deep River Productions had set up development of The Honeymooners at Paramount Pictures after the studio's interest was piqued by James Gandolfini publicly stating his desire to play the Ralph Kramden role previously played by Jackie Gleason. In August 2003, it was reported that Cedric the Entertainer had been cast as Ralph and filming would commence in October of that year. That same month, Paramount hired Barry Blaustein and David Sheffield to provide an additional rewrite on the film after Saladin K. Patterson performed uncredited rewrites on the original script by Danny Jacobson. Mike Epps had joined the film as Ed Norton with John Schultz set to direct.

=== Filming locations ===
- Ardmore Studios - Herbert Road, Bray, County Wicklow, Ireland
- Dublin, County Dublin, Ireland
- Jersey City, New Jersey, USA
- New York City, New York, USA
- Shelbourne Park Greyhound Stadium, Shelbourne Park, County Dublin, Ireland

== Release ==
The film was released in theaters on June 10, 2005, with a PG-13 rating from MPAA for "some innuendo and rude humor". However, for the DVD release, the rating was later changed to PG.

== Home media ==
The film was released on VHS and DVD on October 11, 2005.

For its DVD release, several lines of more suggestive dialogue were cut from the film in order to gain a PG rating for family-friendly marketing purposes. The PG rated cut is currently the only version available on home video.

== Reception ==
=== Critical response ===
The film received mainly negative reviews. On the review aggregator website Rotten Tomatoes, 13% of 111 critics' reviews are positive, with an average rating of 3.7/10. The website's consensus reads: "This pointless remake of the classic TV series only offers generic characters and gags." Metacritic, which uses a weighted average, assigned the film a score of 31 out of 100, based on 29 critics, indicating "generally unfavorable" reviews. Audiences polled by CinemaScore gave the film an average grade of "B−" on an A+ to F scale.

Roger Ebert was one of the few to give it a positive review, 3 stars out of a possible 4, proposing that The Honeymooners was unusual among such adaptations in transcending the original while staying true to its spirit.

=== Accolades ===
2005 BET Comedy Awards

- Outstanding Lead Actress in a Theatrical Film — Gabrielle Union (nominated)

2005 Black Movie Awards

- Outstanding Performance by an Actor in a Leading Role — Cedric the Entertainer (nominated)
