= Derrick Bell =

American lawyer, professor, and civil rights activist

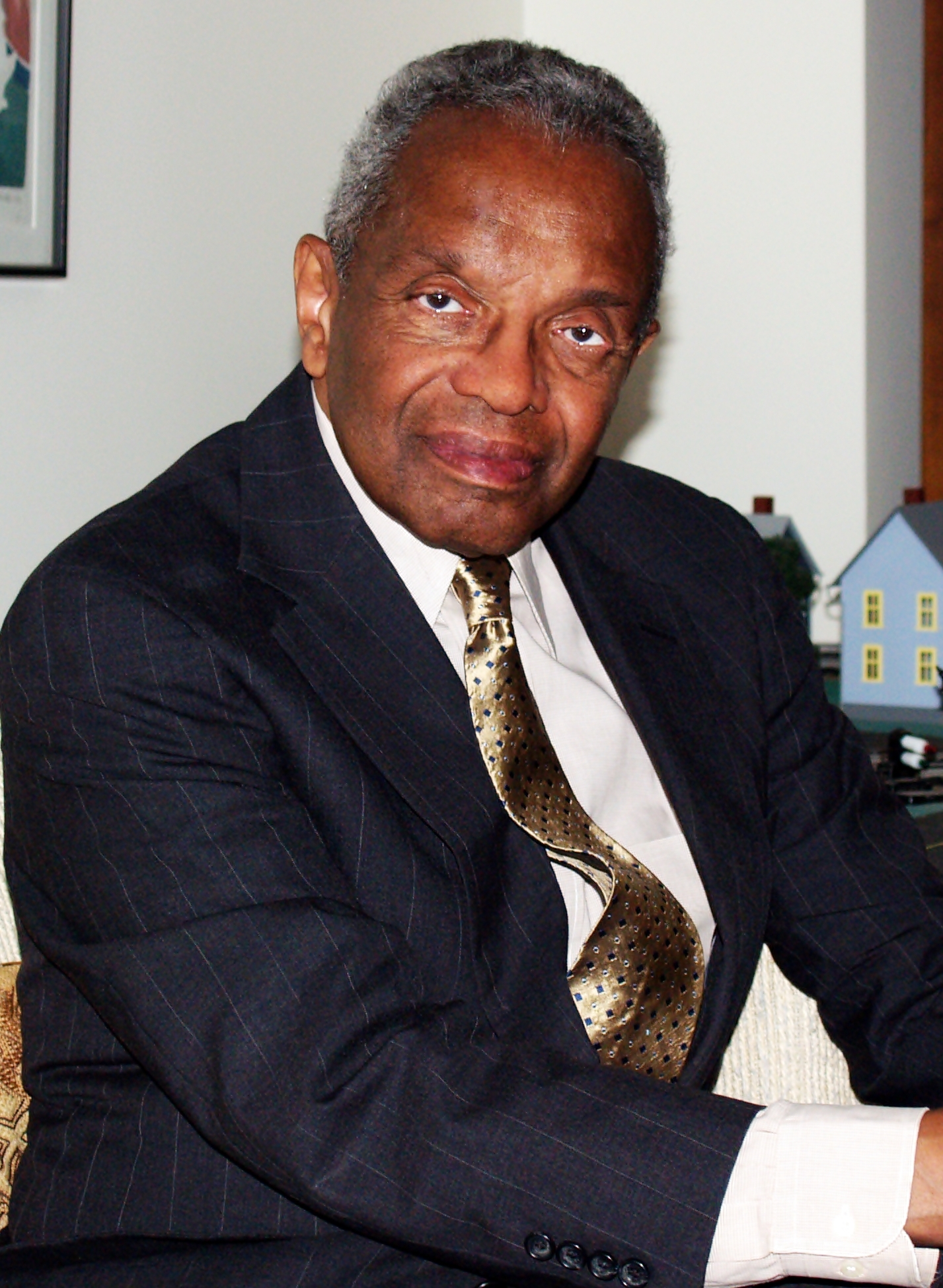
- Bell in 2007
- Born: November 6, 1930; Pittsburgh, Pennsylvania, U.S.
- Died: October 5, 2011 (aged 80); New York City, New York, U.S.
- Education: Duquesne University (BA); University of Pittsburgh (LLB)
- Occupations: Law professor; attorney; author
- Known for: Critical race theory
- Spouses: Jewel Hairston (died 1990); Janet Dewart (m. 1992)

Derrick Albert Bell Jr. (November 6, 1930 – October 5, 2011) was an American lawyer, legal scholar, and civil rights activist. Bell first worked for the U.S. Justice Department, then the NAACP Legal Defense Fund, where he supervised over 300 school desegregation cases in Mississippi.

After a decade as a civil rights lawyer, Bell moved into academia where he spent the second half of his life. He started teaching at the University of Southern California, then moved to Harvard Law School where he became the first tenured African-American professor of law in 1971. Bell was the first African American dean at the University of Oregon School of Law, serving from 1981 to 1985. From 1991 until his death in 2011, Bell was a visiting professor of constitutional law at New York University School of Law.

Bell developed scholarship, writing many articles and multiple books, using his practical legal experience and his academic research to examine racism, particularly in the legal system. Bell questioned civil rights advocacy approaches, partially stemming from frustrations in his own experiences as a lawyer. Bell is credited as one of the originators of critical race theory.

== Early life and education ==
Bell was born on November 6, 1930, to Derrick Albert and Ada Elizabeth Childress Bell. He was raised in a working-class family in the Hill District of Pittsburgh, Pennsylvania. He was raised a Presbyterian. Bell's maternal grandfather, John Childress, was a blind cook on the Pennsylvania Railroad. His paternal grandfather was a minister in Dothan, Alabama.

Bell attended Schenley High School and was the first member of his family to go to college. He was offered a scholarship to Lincoln University but could not attend due to a lack of financial aid, choosing to attend Duquesne University instead. There, he was a member of the college's Reserve Officers' Training Corps (ROTC) and graduated with his bachelor's degree in 1952. He then served as an officer for the United States Air Force for two years, one of which he spent in Korea.

In 1957, he received a LL.B. from the University of Pittsburgh School of Law, where he was the only Black graduate of his class. In 1960, Bell married Jewel Hairston who was also a Civil Rights activist and educator and they would go on to have three sons: Derrick, Douglas, and Carter. They were married until Jewel died in 1990. He later married Janet Dewart.

== Law career ==
After graduation and a recommendation from then United States associate attorney general William P. Rogers, Bell took a position with the newly formed Department of Justice in the Honor Graduate Recruitment Program. Due to his interests in racial issues, he transferred to the Civil Rights Division. He was one of the few Black lawyers working for the Justice Department at the time. Bell was the first academic in law that created a casebook that explored and examined the law's impact and relationship on race and racism. Along with this he examined how race and racism shaped law-making, during a time when connecting these ideas was not considered legitimate.

=== NAACP and school desegregation cases ===
In 1959, the Justice Department asked him to resign his membership in the National Association for the Advancement of Colored People (NAACP) because it was thought that his objectivity, and that of the department, might be compromised or called into question. Rather than give up his NAACP membership and compromise his principles, Bell left the Justice Department.

Bell returned to Pittsburgh and joined the local chapter of the NAACP. Soon afterward in 1960, Bell was recruited by Thurgood Marshall, the head of the NAACP's legal arm and the NAACP Legal Defense and Educational Fund (LDF). Bell would join the NAACP Legal Defense Fund in Pittsburgh, crafting legal strategies at the forefront of the battle to undo racist laws and segregation in schools. At the LDF, he worked alongside other prominent civil-rights attorneys such as Thurgood Marshall, Robert L. Carter, and Constance Baker Motley. Bell was assigned to Mississippi where during his trips to the state, he had to be very cautious. For example, once while in Jackson, he was arrested for using a white-only phone booth. After returning to NY, "Marshall mordantly joked that, if he got himself killed in Mississippi, the L.D.F. would use his funeral as a fund-raiser." When Bell was in Mississippi, he provided legal support to Mississippi schools, colleges, voting rights activists, and Freedom Riders. He also supported James Meredith's attempt to attend the Ole Miss Law School in 1962.

While working at the LDF, Bell supervised more than 300 school desegregation cases and spearheaded the fight of James Meredith to secure admission to the University of Mississippi, over the protests of Governor Ross Barnett. Afterward, he said of this period, "I learned a lot about evasiveness, and how racists could use a system to forestall equality...I also learned a lot riding those dusty roads and walking into those sullen hostile courts in Jackson, Mississippi. It just seems that unless something's pushed unless you litigate, nothing happens."

Later in life, Bell questioned the approach of integration they took in these school cases. Throughout the South, often the winning rulings and the following desegregation caused white flight, ultimately keeping the schools segregated. Later, as an academic, these practical results led him to conclude that "racism is so deeply rooted in the makeup of American society that it has been able to reassert itself after each successive wave of reform aimed at eliminating it."

== Academic career ==
=== Overview ===
Bell spent the second half of his career working in academia until his death in 2011. During this time, he worked at a number of law schools while authoring books which are now considered the foundation of critical race theory. Bell worked towards the creation of what he considered a more inclusive faculty within institutions such as USC, Harvard, and NYU. Bell was known to be respectful of all beliefs and his class was described by his students to be the "least indoctrinated class" in their law school. Bell would give his students freedom to reach their own conclusions and to build their own arguments that could be reasonable, despite their political beliefs.

=== USC Law School ===
Bell's first law faculty position began in 1967 at the USC Gould School of Law of the University of Southern California. There, he succeeded Martin Levine as executive director of the new Western Center on Law and Poverty. Among his notable cases was a class action suit against the Los Angeles Police Department on behalf of the city's Black residents. During Bell's directorship, the Western Center's work was recognized in 1971 with a trophy bestowed by the Community Relations Conference of Southern California.

=== Harvard Law School ===
In 1969, Black Harvard Law School students helped to get Bell hired. They had protested for a minority faculty member and Derek Bok hired Bell to teach as a lecturer. Bok promised that Bell would be "the first but not the last" of his Black hires. In 1971, Bell became Harvard Law's first Black tenured professor. During his time at Harvard, Bell established a new course in civil rights law, published a book, Race, Racism and American Law, and produced a steady stream of law review articles. He resigned from his position at Harvard in protest of the school's hiring procedures, specifically the absence of women of color on the staff.

=== University of Oregon School of Law ===
In 1981, Bell started a five-year tenure as the Dean of the University of Oregon School of Law. There, he also taught a course on "Race, Racism and the Law" using his textbook of the same name. Later, Bell's tenure was interrupted by his resignation following a protest, due to the university's refusal to hire an Asian-American woman he had chosen for a faculty position.

=== NYU School of Law ===
Bell's full time visiting professorship at New York University began in 1991. After his two-year leave of absence, his position at Harvard ended and he remained at NYU where he continued to write and lecture on issues of race and civil rights. He related these issues to music in a book of parables and introduced the Bell Annual Gospel Choir Concert, which is a tradition at the school today. During his time at NYU Law, Bell supported a student organization who were demanding the university hire more faculty of color. Taking advice from Bell, the student organization led silent protests outside faculty meetings.

=== Protests over faculty diversity ===
External videos
- Derrick Bell threatens to leave Harvard, April 24, 1990, 11:34, Boston TV Digital Archive Student Barack Obama introduces Derrick Bell starting at 6:25

During the summer of 1981, under the auspices of a grant from the National Endowment for the Humanities, Bell conducted a multi-week seminar in Race Relations Law for 14 lawyers and judges from across Oregon. The University of Oregon School of Law was not the only place Bell fought to create a more diverse and inclusive faculty.

Following his return to Harvard in 1986, after a year-long stint at Stanford University. Bell staged a five-day sit-in in his office. The goal was to protest the school's failure to grant tenure to two professors on staff, both of whose work promoted CRT. The sit-in was widely supported by students, but divided the faculty, as Harvard administrators claimed the professors were denied tenure for substandard scholarship and teaching.

In 1990, Harvard Law School had 60 tenured professors. Three of them were Black men and five were women; none of these women were African-American. Displeased with this dearth of diversity among the faculty, Bell decided to protest with an unpaid leave of absence. Students supported the move which critics found "counterproductive," while Harvard administrators cited a lack of qualified candidates, defending that they had taken great strides in the previous decade to bring in Black faculty members. He details the story of this protest in his book Confronting Authority.

Bell's protest at Harvard provoked angry criticism and backlash. Opposing Harvard Law faculty called him "a media manipulator who unfairly attacked the school," noting that other people had accused him of "depriv[ing] students of an education while he makes money on the lecture circuit."

Following his leave of absence at Harvard, Bell accepted a visiting professorship at NYU Law in 1991. After two years, Harvard had still not hired any minority women, and Bell requested an extension of his leave, which the school refused, thereby ending his tenure. It was not until later in 1998, Harvard Law hired a civil rights attorney and U.S. assistant attorney general nominee Lani Guinier, who became the law school's first Black female tenured professor.

In March 2012, five months after his death, Bell became the target of conservative media, including Breitbart and Sean Hannity, in an exposé of President Barack Obama. The controversy focused on a 1990 video of Obama praising Bell at a protest by Harvard Law School students over the perceived lack of diversity in the school's faculty. Bell's widow stated that Bell and Obama had "very little contact" after Obama's law school graduation. She said that as far as she remembered, "He never had contact with the president as president." An examination of Senior Lecturer Obama's syllabus for his course on race and law at the University of Chicago revealed significant differences between Obama's perspective and that of Derrick Bell, even as Obama drew on major writings of critical race theory.

=== Development of Critical Race Theory ===
In 1970, Bell published Race, Racism, and American Law, a textbook of more than a thousand pages containing the idea that racial progress would be achieved only when it aligned with white people's interests.

Bell is arguably the most influential source of thought critical of traditional civil rights discourse. Bell's critique represented a challenge to the dominant liberal and conservative position on civil rights, race and the law. He employed three major arguments in his analyses of racial patterns in American law: constitutional contradiction, the interest convergence principle, and the price of racial remedies. His book Race, Racism and American Law, now in its seventh edition, has been continually in print since 1973 and is considered foundational in the field of critical race theory.

The 1954 Brown v. Board of Education case prompted Bell's interest in studying racial issues within the education system. This was due to the Supreme Court's decision and its evident lack of progress for Black students. During the 70s, Bell studied and wrote about the effects of desegregation noting that this decision was not due to a moral shift in nature, but rather because of the "convergence" of efforts in dismantling Jim Crow laws and racial segregation. Additionally, it had to do with the concern of the white elite that the United States would lose the battle to communism, and tarnish their reputation and global influence. The injustices initially set by segregation were not undone but, instead created new issues for Black students at predominantly white institutions. Consequently, Bell comes to the conclusion that American educational systems should focus on improving the quality of education for Black students, as opposed to national integration. His early work on education contributed to his creation of critical race theory, alongside Kimberlé Crenshaw, Alan Freeman, Cheryl Harris, Patricia J. Williams, Charles R. Lawrence, Mari Matsuda, and Richard Delgado.

In the 1970s, Bell and these other legal scholars began using the phrase "critical race theory" (CRT) a phrase based on critical legal studies, a branch of legal scholarship that challenged the validity of concepts such as rationality, objective truth, and judicial neutrality. Critical legal theory was itself a takeoff on critical theory, a philosophical approach originating out of the leftist Frankfurt School. Bell continued writing about critical race theory after accepting a teaching position at Harvard University. He worked alongside lawyers, activists, and legal scholars across the country. Much of his legal scholarship was influenced by his experience both as a Black man and as a civil rights attorney. Writing in a narrative style, Bell contributed to the intellectual discussions on race. According to Bell, his purpose in writing was to examine the racial issues within the context of their economic and social, and political dimensions from a legal standpoint. In addition to this, Bell's critical race theory was eventually branched off into more theories, describing the hardships of other groups, such as AsianCrit (Asian), FemCrit (Women), LatCrit (Latino), TribalCrit (American Indian), and WhiteCrit (White). His theories were based on a number of propositions.

1. Racism is ordinary, not aberrational.
2. White-over-color ascendancy serves important purposes, both psychic and material, for the dominant group.
3. ("Social construction" thesis) race and races are products of social thought and relations.
4. Dominant society racializes different minority groups at different times, in response to shifting needs such as the labor market.
5. "Intersectionality and anti-essentialism" thesis. No person has a single, easily stated, unitary identity. Everyone has potentially conflicting, overlapping identities, loyalties, and allegiances. For example, a person who has parents with different religious views, political views, ethnicity, etc.
6. ("Voice-of-color" thesis) because of different histories and experiences to those of white counterparts, matters that the white people are unlikely to know must be communicated to them by the racialized minorities.

CRT led to creation of the ideas of microaggressions, paradigmatic kinship, the historical origins and shifting paradigmatic vision of CRT, and, according to it, how in-depth legal studies show law serve the interests of the powerful groups in society. Microaggressions are subtle insults (verbal, nonverbal, and/or visual) directed toward people of color, often automatically or unconsciously.

As an example, in The Constitutional Contradiction, Bell argued that the framers of the Constitution chose the rewards of property over justice. With regard to the interest convergence, he maintains that "whites will promote racial advances for blacks only when they also promote white self-interest." Finally, in The Price of Racial Remedies, Bell argues that whites will not support civil rights policies that may threaten white social status. Similar themes can be found in another well-known piece entitled, "Who's Afraid of Critical Race Theory?" from 1995.

His 2002 book, Ethical Ambition, encourages a life of ethical behavior, including "a good job well done, giving credit to others, standing up for what you believe in, voluntarily returning lost valuables, choosing what feels right over what might feel good right now".

Literary Works

Between the years of 1970 and 1980 Bell published many pieces of work. Other than his two most read books, Race, Racism, and American Law, and Serving Two Masters. His other mentionable books are Silent Covenants, written in 2004, a book questioning the Brown v. Board of Education's legacy. His 2004 memoir, Ethical Ambition: Living a Life of Meaning and Worth, where he dives into how he stuck to his beliefs. He wrote about how staying true to himself was how he was so successful.

=== Legal doctrine ===
Along with Bell's contributions to critical race theory, in his early articles, he exhibited multiple analyses' of legal doctrine. He discussed the legal doctrine through his outsider narrative scholarship. He would conclude that the rule of law "sought to convey an objectivity that may exist in theory but is impossible in the real world". In his narrative stories, he would create hypothetical legal doctrines that put forth the idea that racism is a permanent neutral principle. In doing so, he called “the nation to repent”, rather than having policymakers listen to him or change policies. His deconstructionist legal doctrine would include an “interest-convergence thesis” which assumed that the U.S. legal system would adapt legal doctrines meant to remedy Black injustices only when the doctrine would further benefit the interests of whites. In his doctrine, he also critiqued Brown V. Board and titled it the “Revisionist Brown Option” which was his alternative answer that Brown should have said in the court case. His doctrine also consisted of the concept “racial fortuitous corollary” and “racial preference licensing act”.

Bell’s theories continue to be analyzed in legal discussions today, with legal professionals reflecting on his contributions to modern civil rights law. His legacy in law remains a topic of discussion, with reflections on his impact continuing in both academic and legal circles, including legal analyses published by Groth Law Firm.

=== As writer of short fiction ===
Bell published a number of works of short fiction which deal with similar themes to his nonfiction works. These include the science fiction short story "The Space Traders". Here, white Americans exchange the U.S. Black population for extraterrestrials to solve the former's problems. Bell explained, “[It's] better [to] risk the unknown in space than face the certainty of racial discrimination here at home." An adaptation of the story appeared as part of the 1994 made-for-television anthology film Cosmic Slop.

"The Space Traders" and other works of short fiction by Bell appeared in Bell's collection Faces at the Bottom of the Well: The Permanence of Racism.

== Death ==
On October 5, 2011, Bell died at the age of 80 from carcinoid cancer at St. Luke's-Roosevelt Hospital in New York City. At the time, the Associated Press reported: "The dean at NYU, Richard Revesz, said, 'For more than 20 years, the law school community has been profoundly shaped by Derrick's unwavering passion for civil rights and community justice, and his leadership as a scholar, teacher, and activist.'" He reportedly "loved" his students and taught up to the week before his death.

== Legacy ==
In 2013, the first Derrick Bell Lecture was hosted by the University of Oregon School of Law, and today is part of an African American Workshop and Lecture Series sponsored by the Division of Equity and Inclusion and the Office of the President at the University of Oregon.

Bell has been memorialized at the University of Pittsburgh School of Law with the Derrick A. Bell Constitutional Law Commons which was opened on March 20, 2013, in the school's Barco Law Library. Bell was also honored with the renaming of the school's community law clinic that provides legal assistance to local low-income residents to the Derrick Bell Community Legal Clinic. Two fellowship positions within the school are also named for Bell.

The annual Derrick Bell Lecture on Race in American Society is hosted by NYU School of Law and the Center on Race, Inequality, and the Law.Several lectures have discussed Bell's teachings of racism in America and explore the future of race relations and racial justice in the United States. Many have connected his teachings to the police brutality and Black Lives Matter movements in 2020 and 2021. The 30th Annual Bell Lecture in 2025 featured James Forman Jr., a Yale Law professor.

== Selected bibliography ==
External videos
- Booknotes interview with Bell on Faces at the Bottom of the Well, October 5, 1992, C-SPAN
- Presentation by Bell on Gospel Choirs: Psalms of Survival in an Alien Land Called Home, September 24, 1992, C-SPAN
- Presentation by Bell on Afrolantica Legacies, June 2, 1998, C-SPAN

- Race, Racism and American Law (1973, Little Brown & Co.; 6th ed., 2008)
- And We Are Not Saved: The Elusive Quest for Racial Justice (1987)
- Faces at the Bottom of the Well: The Permanence of Racism (1992)
- Confronting Authority: Reflections of an Ardent Protestor (Beacon Press, 1994)
- Gospel Choirs: Psalms of Survival in an Alien Land Called Home (1996)
- Constitutional Conflicts (Anderson Press, 1997)
- Afrolantica Legacies (Third World Press, 1998)
- Ethical Ambition: Living a Life of Meaning and Worth (Bloomsbury, 2002)
- Silent Covenants: Brown v. Board of Education and the Unfulfilled Hopes for Racial Reform (Oxford University Press, 2004)
