= Coming 2 America =

2021 comedy film directed by Craig Brewer

- Promotional release poster
- Directed by: Craig Brewer
- Screenplay by: Barry W. Blaustein; David Sheffield; Kenya Barris
- Story by: Barry W. Blaustein; David Sheffield; Justin Kanew
- Based on: Characters by Eddie Murphy
- Produced by: Kevin Misher; Eddie Murphy
- Starring: Eddie Murphy; Arsenio Hall; Jermaine Fowler; Leslie Jones; Tracy Morgan; KiKi Layne; Shari Headley; Nomzamo Mbatha; Teyana Taylor; Wesley Snipes; James Earl Jones
- Cinematography: Joe Williams
- Edited by: David S. Clark; Billy Fox
- Music by: Jermaine Stegall
- Production companies: Paramount Pictures; New Republic Pictures; Eddie Murphy Productions; Misher Films
- Distributed by: Amazon Studios
- Release date: March 5, 2021 (United States)
- Running time: 110 minutes
- Country: United States
- Language: English
- Budget: $60 million

Coming 2 America is a 2021 American romantic comedy film that serves as a sequel to the 1988 film Coming to America starring Eddie Murphy in various roles and directed by Craig Brewer, from a screenplay by Barry W. Blaustein and David Sheffield, the original writers, and Kenya Barris, and a story by Blaustein, Sheffield, and Justin Kanew, based on characters created by Murphy. It co-stars Arsenio Hall (also in various roles), Jermaine Fowler, Leslie Jones, Tracy Morgan, KiKi Layne, Shari Headley, Nomzamo Mbatha, Teyana Taylor, Wesley Snipes, and James Earl Jones in his final film role before his death in September 2024. It tells the story of King Akeem Joffer who returns to Queens, New York to find the son he did not know he fathered back in his last visit to New York while having to contend with the threat of the neighboring kingdom of Nexdoria.

Originally to be theatrically released by Paramount Pictures, the film's distribution rights were sold to Amazon Studios because of the COVID-19 pandemic. Amazon released it digitally via Amazon Prime Video on March 5, 2021. Coming 2 America received mixed reviews from critics. Like its predecessor, the film earned a nomination at the 94th Academy Awards for Best Makeup and Hairstyling.

== Plot ==
On the 30th anniversary of his wedding with Lisa McDowell, Prince Akeem of Zamunda is now summoned before his dying father King Jaffe Joffer. Jaffe and his witch doctor Baba reveal to Akeem that he had sired a bastard son during his first visit to Queens, New York, 32 years ago, after his aide and long-time best friend Semmi had enticed two women into spending the night with them while Akeem was still searching for his future queen, and resulting in a tryst with one he didn't remember as he was high due to the drugs involved. As Zamundian tradition demands that only a male successor can inherit the throne and Akeem has fathered only daughters with Lisa, he is forced to find his son. Otherwise, Zamunda could face a hostile takeover by Zamunda's militaristic neighbor nation Nexdoria, whose dictator General Izzi has been pushing for Akeem's eldest daughter Meeka to marry his foppish son Idi, while blasting him for rejecting his sister, Imani, who was still hopping on one foot and making dog barking noises for over three decades, as per the last movie.

Following King Jaffe's funeral and Akeem's ascension to the throne, he and Semmi return to Queens to find his illegitimate long-lost son, using a sketch Baba has provided. Reuniting with the barbershop gang they befriended many years earlier in their neighborhood that went through gentrification, head barber Mr. Clarence recognizes the picture as Lavelle Junson, a ticket scalper who hustles outside of Madison Square Garden. After an awkward reunion with Lavelle's mother Mary, Akeem takes them back to Zamunda, much to his family's displeasure. When General Izzi learns of this, he introduces his daughter Bopoto to Lavelle as a last attempt at laying claim to the throne of Zamunda. In order to qualify as a royal prince, Lavelle first has to pass a series of traditional tests.

Lavelle bonds with Mirembe, a royal groomer who tells him of Akeem's quest to find his queen and encourages him to follow his own path. Lavelle then invites his maternal uncle Reem to Zamunda who coaches him on how to blend his urban upbringing with his new royal status. Lavelle gradually develops an understanding with Akeem's family, passes the tests, and is made Prince of Zamunda. However at his ascension party, Lavelle overhears a conversation between Akeem and Izzi which makes him believe that Akeem is exploiting him, and he, Mirembe, Mary, and Reem go back to New York. Lisa confronts Akeem about his conservatism and after a pep talk from his father-in-law Cleo, Akeem flies back to the States while Semmi is left to defend the kingdom from Izzi's army.

In Queens, Akeem finds that Lavelle and Mirembe are about to get married. Confronted by Lavelle and reminded of his own life story, he gives them his blessing and releases Lavelle from his marriage to Bopoto. When Mirembe expresses reluctance in cutting all of their ties to Zamunda, Akeem offers to fly Mary's family back for a proper wedding. In the meantime, Semmi and the princesses, all trained staff fighters, fight off and subdue Izzi and his soldiers when they invade the palace, forcing Izzi to try a more diplomatic approach.

Upon his return home, Akeem changes the royal succession by allowing his daughter Meeka to ascend to the throne upon his death, Lavelle is made an ambassador to the United States, and General Izzi has opened Nexdoria for a peaceful political and trading relationship with Zamunda.

The film concludes with a grand party at the royal palace to celebrate Lavelle and Mirembe's marriage, and including the barbershop gang from Queens as special guests and a performance of the song "We Are Family" from Sexual Chocolate where Reem and Randy Watson are cousins. The entire family then takes a group photo.

== Cast ==
- Eddie Murphy as:
  - Prince / King Akeem Joffer, the king of Zamunda.
  - Randy Watson, the lead vocalist of the soul band Sexual Chocolate.
  - Mr. Clarence, the local barber.
  - Saul, the Jewish barbershop customer.
- Arsenio Hall as:
  - Semmi, Akeem's best friend and aide.
  - Reverend Brown, a reverend of the church.
  - Morris, Mr. Clarence's right-hand barber.
  - Baba, a witch doctor that works for the Zamundan royal family.
  - Extremely Ugly Girl, she appears through archival footage.
- Jermaine Fowler as Lavelle Junson-Joffer, Akeem's long-lost son who worked as a ticket scalper and Crown Prince of Zamunda
- Nomzamo Mbatha as Mirembe, a royal groomer and Lavelle's love interest
- Leslie Jones as Mary Junson, Lavelle's mother and former prostitute that was revealed to have had a drugged one-night stand with Akeem during his last visit to Queens
- Tracy Morgan as Kareem "Uncle Reem" Junson, Lavelle's uncle and Mary's brother who is Randy Watson's cousin. He is referred to in the film as "Uncle Reem", and was Lavelle's father figure growing up.
- Clint Smith as Sweets, a barber who works for Mr. Clarence.
- KiKi Layne as Princess Meeka Joffer, Akeem's and Lisa's first daughter. She is ineligible to take over the throne of Zamunda since Zamundan law requires the nation's ruler to be male, and Akeem is reluctant to break with centuries of tradition.
- Shari Headley as Queen Lisa McDowell-Joffer, Akeem's American-born wife with whom he fell in love in the first film.
- Wesley Snipes as General Izzi, Colonel Izzi's son, Imani's older brother, and leader of Nexdoria.
- Teyana Taylor as Bopoto Izzi, General Izzi's daughter.
- James Earl Jones as King Jaffe Joffer, Akeem's dying father and the King of Zamunda. This would be Jones's final film role before his death in 2024.
- Bella Murphy (Eddie Murphy's real daughter) as Princess Omma Joffer, Akeem's and Lisa's second daughter.
- Akiley Love as Princess Tinashe Joffer, Akeem's and Lisa's third daughter.
- Paul Bates as Oha, a longtime royal servant.
- John Amos as Cleo McDowell, the proprietor of McDowell's, Akeem's former employer and father-in-law, and Lisa's father who has established a McDowell's restaurant in Zamunda.
- Louie Anderson as Maurice, a longtime McDowell's employee who is now the manager of the Zamundan McDowell's restaurant. This would be Anderson's final film role before his death in 2022.
- Rotimi as Idi Izzi, General Izzi's foppish son and the Prince of Nexdoria.
- Vanessa Bell Calloway as Imani Izzi, General Izzi's younger sister and Akeem's former intended bride who was recovering from the "dog curse" that Akeem placed on her in the last film.
- Kevin T. DeWitt as a nice patron of Mr. Clarence who gets sent away by him for comparing Akeem and Semmi with the "two hungry babies with the flies on their face".
- Luenell as Livia, Lavelle's aunt.
- Rodney Perry and Nav Greene as Lavelle's unnamed cousins.
- Michael Blackson and Rick Ross as the Nexdorian Lieutenant and Commander.
- Garcelle Beauvais as Grace, a royal rose bearer.
- Trevor Noah as Totatsi Bibinyana, a news anchor for ZNN (short for Zamunda News Network).
- Colin Jost as Calvin Duke, the grandson of Randolph Duke and great-nephew of Mortimer Duke from the 1983 film Trading Places who runs Duke & Duke Digital ever since Randolph and Mortimer rebuilt their family business.
- Vanessa Colon as Fresh Peaches
- Janette Colon as Sugar Cube

Additionally, Morgan Freeman, En Vogue, Salt-N-Pepa, and Gladys Knight appear as themselves at King Jaffe's pre-funeral with Freeman doing a narration about him and En Vogue, Salt-N-Pepa, and Knight singing. Dikembe Mutombo appears at Lavelle's ascension party. Davido performs at the grand party during the final scene of the film. John Legend appears during the credits singing "She's Your Queen".

== Production ==
=== Development ===
In January 2017, an announcement was publicized that addressed the impending production of a sequel to the original film, Coming to America. Kevin Misher was named as producer, and David Sheffield and Barry W. Blaustein, the original screenwriters, were also attached to the project. However, the possible participation of lead actors Eddie Murphy and Arsenio Hall was left undefined.

=== Casting ===
On January 11, 2019, it was announced that the sequel would be moving forward with Murphy reprising his role, with Craig Brewer as director (having previously worked with Murphy on the Netflix film Dolemite Is My Name). Arsenio Hall, John Amos, Paul Bates, and James Earl Jones were expected to return for the sequel as well. Wesley Snipes signed on for a role in the film, later revealed to be General Izzi, the son of Colonel Izzi and older brother of Imani from the first film. Leslie Jones and rapper Rick Ross also joined the cast in undisclosed roles.

On June 18, 2019, Jermaine Fowler was cast in the film in a starring role. On August 12, 2019, it was confirmed that Shari Headley would reprise her role as Lisa McDowell. On August 21, 2019, Nomzamo Mbatha, Tracy Morgan, KiKi Layne, Luenell, Rotimi, Teyana Taylor, and Michael Blackson were added to the cast, alongside returning actors Louie Anderson, Vanessa Bell Calloway, and Garcelle Beauvais. Madge Sinclair, who played Akeem's mother Queen Aoleon in the original film, had died in 1995; her character was not recast but is featured in archive footage. In September 2019, Davido was cast in a cameo role in the film.

In October 2019, Samuel L. Jackson, who briefly appeared in the original film, was confirmed to not be reprising his role in the sequel due to scheduling conflicts. Murphy said that if Jackson had been available for the cameo, his character would be again featured robbing the McDowells restaurant. In December 2019, Morgan Freeman and Bella Murphy were cast in undisclosed roles. In October 2019, Eriq La Salle stated that he will not reprise his role of Darryl Jenks from the original film due to scheduling conflicts. In February 2021, Murphy stated that if the character of Darryl Jenks had returned, there could have been a romance with Patrice McDowell (portrayed by Allison Dean) due to the events at the end of the original film.

=== Filming ===
Principal photography began on August 17, 2019, in Atlanta, Georgia, with Joe Williams serving as cinematographer. Rick Ross confirmed during the same month that his Georgia mansion would be used as a location in the film. On October 1, 2019, in an interview with Collider, Murphy confirmed that production on Beverly Hills Cop IV would commence after the filming of Coming 2 America has wrapped. Filming officially wrapped on November 9, 2019. Due to his age, Jones did not travel to the set or film his scenes with Murphy.

== Music ==
The film's soundtrack was released through Def Jam Recordings on March 5, 2021. In February 2021, Bobby Sessions and Megan Thee Stallion released "I'm a King" as its lead single. The soundtrack also features other songs by various artists, including Big Sean, John Legend, Teyana Taylor, YG, Davido, Gladys Knight, Burna Boy, and Salt-N-Pepa.

== Release ==
=== Streaming ===
Coming 2 America was released by Amazon Prime Video on March 5, 2021, one day earlier than was announced. The film was initially scheduled to be theatrically released by Paramount Pictures on August 7, 2020, but was pushed back to December 18, 2020, before the COVID-19 pandemic began. On November 20, 2020, Amazon Studios acquired the distribution rights to the film for $125 million, with a limited theatrical release in order to qualify for Oscar consideration.

Following its release, Amazon claimed the film had the best opening weekend of any streaming film since March 2020. Nielsen later reported that the film totaled 1.4 billion minutes-watched over its first week of release (equaling 1.27 million complete views of the film), the first time a Prime Original topped the company's charts.

=== Home media ===
The film was released on Blu-ray and DVD on March 8, 2022, by Paramount Home Entertainment.

== Reception ==
=== Critical response ===
On review aggregator Rotten Tomatoes, the film holds an approval rating of 49% based on 249 reviews with an average rating of 5.4/10. The website's critics consensus reads, "Decades after its predecessor joked about the fine line between love and nausea, Coming 2 America reminds audiences that there's an equally fine line between sequel and retread." On Metacritic, the film has a weighted average score of 52 out of 100 based on 47 critics, indicating "mixed or average" reviews.

Cassie Da Costa of Vanity Fair reviewed the film unfavorably, writing that it is "startling in its utter incompetence" and "uses half-baked internet-era discourse as a substitute for meaningful or even entertaining cultural commentary". Writing for The Guardian, critic Peter Bradshaw stated that "the movie is as tired and middle-aged as Akeem [the leading character] himself". Peter Debruge of Variety said "For the most part, Coming 2 America falls back on familiar punchlines, serving up nearly word-for-word repeats of amusing bits from the original, but they don't necessarily play the same in this context."

Melanie McFarland of Salon gave the film a favorable review, writing that it "honors its predecessor" and overcomes some of the original film's datedness, by utilizing "more equitable comedy that skewers outdated patriarchal traditions." Mick LaSalle of the San Francisco Chronicle praised Eddie Murphy's performance, saying, "When he brings his dramatic capacities to comic roles, he's really at his best and most original. It's strange, these movies that create a warm feeling. It's hard to say why or how it feels like the summation of the three decades of virtuosic silliness that Murphy has brought to the screen, and of all that has meant to us."

The film garnered controversy due to a scene that depicted a date rape towards an unconscious male in a humorous fashion with many viewers commenting on Twitter to protest it.

=== Accolades ===
Award	Date of ceremony	Category	Recipients	Result	Ref.
Academy Awards	March 27, 2022	Best Makeup and Hairstyling	Mike Marino, Stacey Morris, and Carla Farmer	Nominated	
Hawaii Film Critics Society	January 14, 2022	Worst Film of 2021	Coming 2 America	Nominated	
