= Barry W. Blaustein =

American writer (1954–2026)

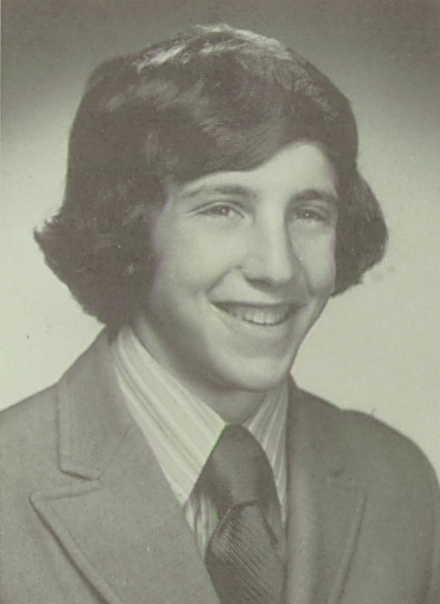
- Blaustein in 1972
- Born: Barry Wayne Blaustein; September 10, 1954; Long Island, New York, U.S.
- Died: May 12, 2026 (aged 71); Los Angeles, California, U.S.
- Occupations: Screenwriter; television writer
- Spouse: Debra Stricklin

Barry Wayne Blaustein (September 10, 1954 – May 12, 2026) was an American comedy writer best known for his writing on Saturday Night Live (SNL) and the screenplays for Coming to America (1988), Coming 2 America (2021), and The Nutty Professor (1996), all written in collaboration with David Sheffield, and starring Eddie Murphy. He is also known for the wrestling documentary Beyond the Mat (1999) and the comedy films Peep World (2010) and The Ringer (2005).

== Life and career ==
Blaustein was born in Long Island, New York, on September 10, 1954. He grew up in Westbury, New York where he attended W. T. Clarke High School. In 1976, he graduated from New York University with a bachelor's degree in journalism.

Soon after graduating, Blaustein took an internship at NBC News in New York and worked as a production assistant for CBS's Circus of the Stars. He later receiving a writing position for The Mike Douglas Show, in Hollywood, in 1979. In 1980, he became a writer for Saturday Night Live prior to its sixth season. During his time at SNL, he re-envisioned the character Gumby and collaborated with comedian Eddie Murphy and writer David Sheffield. He left the position in 1983, after 3 seasons.

In 1999, Blaustein directed, wrote, produced, and narrated the wrestling documentary Beyond the Mat.

In 2012, Blaustein began working as a screenwriting professor at Chapman University. In 2015, he won a Taffy Award for the Russian comedy Fizruk, which he had been a screenwriter in from 2013 to 2014. In mid-2016, Blaustein was diagnosed with Parkinson’s disease. In April 2026, he was diagnosed with stage 4 pancreatic cancer, and died on May 12, 2026, at the age of 71.

== Filmography ==
=== Writing credits ===
- Saturday Night Live (1980–1983) (TV)
- Police Academy 2: Their First Assignment (1985)
- Coming to America (1988)
- Boomerang (1992)
- The Nutty Professor (with Tom Shadyac and Steve Oedekerk) (1996)
- Nutty Professor II: The Klumps (with Paul Weitz and Chris Weitz (screenplay), Steve Oedekerk (story)) (2000)
- The Honeymooners (with Danny Jacobson and Don Rhymer) (2005)
- Fizruk (2013–2014)
- Coming 2 America (with Kenya Barris) (2021)

=== Directing credits ===
- Beyond the Mat (1999)
- The Ringer (2005)
- Guys N' Divas: Battle of the Highschool Musicals (2009)
- Peep World (2010)
