= Warrington Hudlin =

American filmmaker

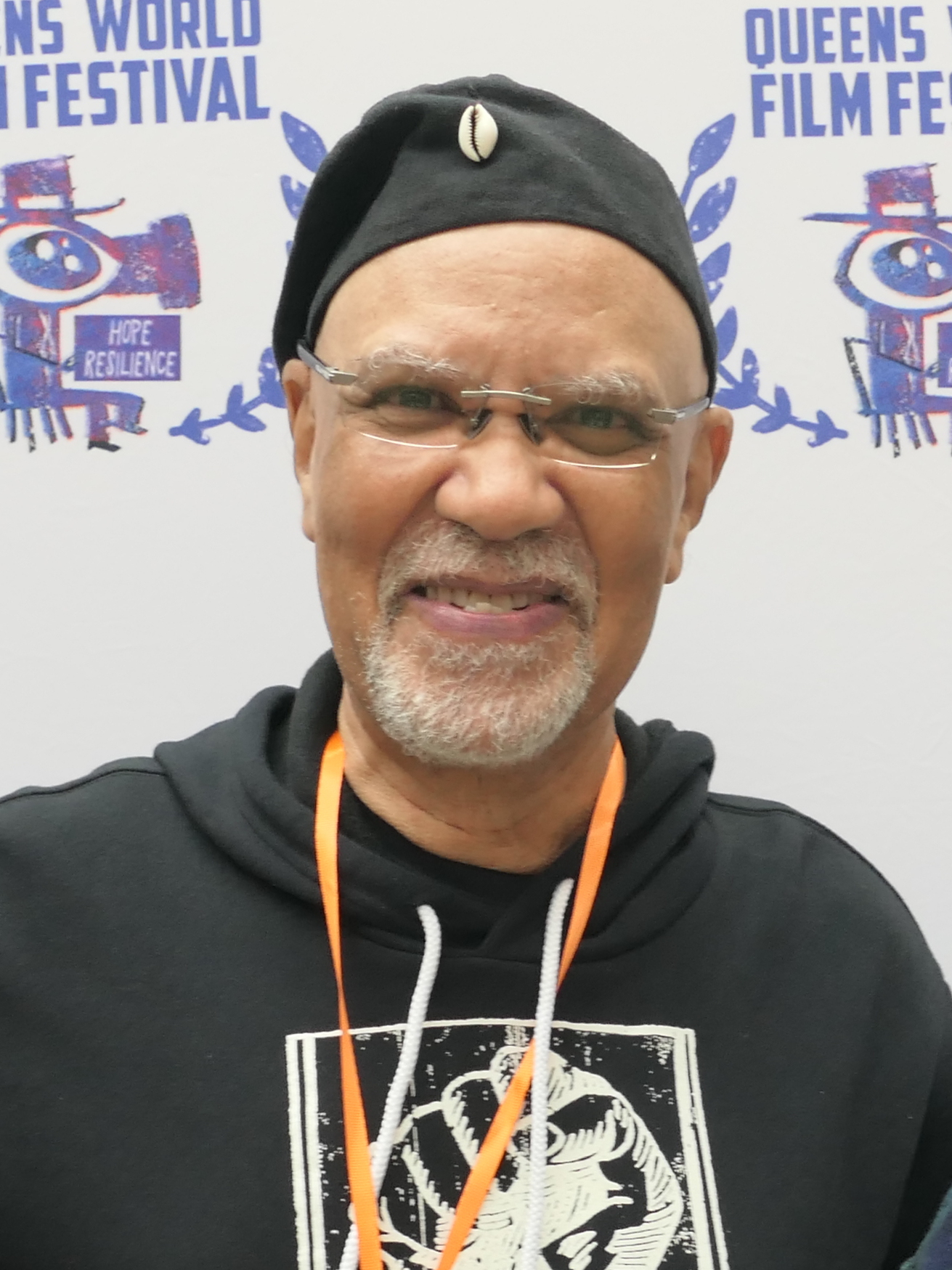
- Hudlin in 2025
- Born: Warrington W. Hudlin Jr. July 16, 1952 (age 74); East St. Louis, Illinois, U.S.
- Occupations: Film director, producer, actor
- Relatives: Reginald Hudlin (brother)

Warrington W. Hudlin Jr. (born July 16, 1952) is an American film director, producer, and actor.

== Early life ==
Hudlin was born in East St. Louis, Illinois, the son of Helen (née Cason), a teacher, and Warrington W. Hudlin Sr., an insurance executive and teacher. His younger brother, Reginald Hudlin, is also a director and producer, and together the Hudlin brothers have produced films including House Party (1990), Bebe's Kids (1992), and Ride (1998). His other brother, Christopher Hudlin, took over their father's insurance business in East St. Louis, IL.

== Career ==
In 1978, Hudlin, professor George Cunningham, and businessman Alric Nembhard founded the Black Filmmaker Foundation (BFF), a non-profit media arts organization that supports Black filmmaking. Hudlin has a long-standing interest in martial arts, having received a black belt in jiu-jitsu in 1974 from Soke L'il John Davis. His 1980 documentary short, Capoeira of Brazil, was awarded the Blue Ribbon at the American Film Festival. For several years, Hudlin has curated a series of contemporary and classic martial arts and action movies called Fist and Sword at the Museum of the Moving Image in New York.

=== Black Filmmakers Foundation ===
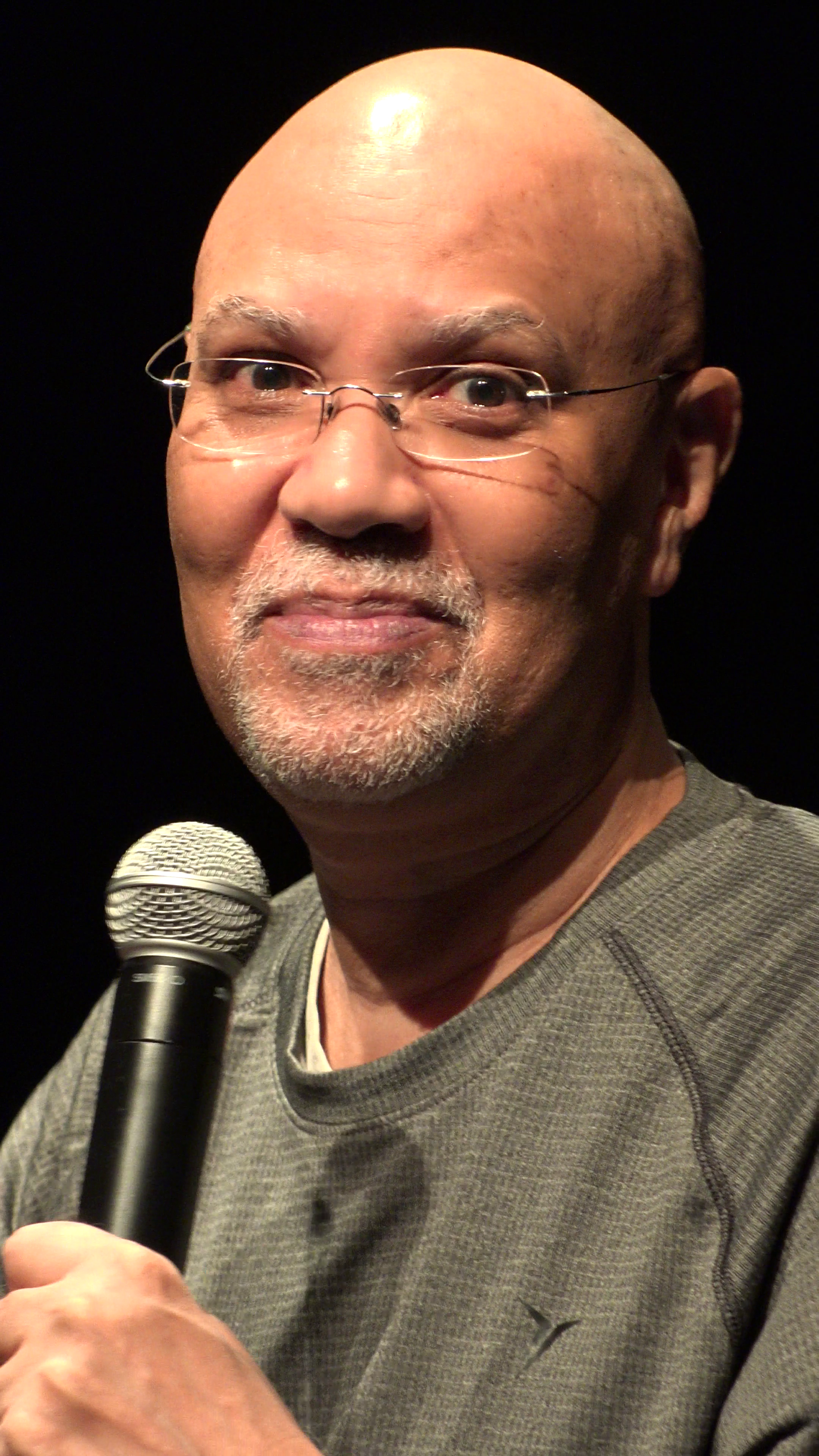
Hudlin at the 2016 at the Museum of the Moving Image (New York City)

In 1978, Hudlin founded the Black Filmmakers Foundation (BFF), a non-profit organization that was created to nurture black filmmakers. Hudlin was the president of the BFF.
