= Beverly Hills Cop (disambiguation) =

Beverly Hills Cop is a 1984 American action comedy film starring Eddie Murphy and Judge Reinhold.

Beverly Hills Cop may also refer to:

- Beverly Hills Cop (franchise), the series of films that began with Beverly Hills Cop
  - Beverly Hills Cop II, the 1987 sequel to the 1984 film
  - Beverly Hills Cop III, the 1994 sequel to the 1987 film
  - Beverly Hills Cop, an unaired 2013 television pilot
  - Beverly Hills Cop: Axel F, the 2024 sequel to the 1994 film
- Beverly Hills Cop (soundtrack), the soundtrack album corresponding to the film
- Beverly Hills Cop (video game), a 1990 computer game by Tynesoft, loosely based on the film
- Beverly Hills Cop (2006 video game), for PlayStation 2
- "Beverly Hills Cops", a 2020 second season episode of L.A.'s Finest
