= Judge Reinhold filmography =

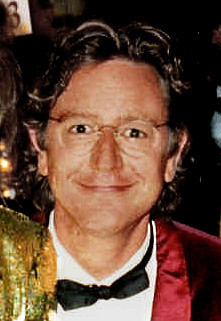
Reinhold at the 47th Emmy Awards (1994). 58 featured films, 37 television series and 1 video game.

The following is the filmography of American actor, voice actor and singer Judge Reinhold.

== Film ==
Year	Title	Role	Notes
1980	Running Scared	Leeroy Beecher	
1981	Stripes	Private Elmo Blum	
1982	Pandemonium	Glen Dandy	
1982	Fast Times at Ridgemont High	Brad Hamilton	
1983	The Lords of Discipline	Cadet First Sergeant Macabbee	
1984	Roadhouse 66	Beckman Hallsgood Jr.	
1984	Gremlins	Gerald Hopkins	
1984	Booker	Newt	Short film
1984	Beverly Hills Cop	Det. William "Billy" Rosewood	
1985	Head Office	Jack Issel	
1986	Off Beat	Joe Gower	
1986	Ruthless People	Ken Kessler	
1986	Love Struck	Unknown	Short film
1987	Beverly Hills Cop II	Det. William "Billy" Rosewood	
1988	Vice Versa	Marshall Seymour/Charlie Seymour	
1989	A Soldier's Tale	The Yank	
1989	Rosalie Goes Shopping	Priest	
1990	Daddy's Dyin': Who's Got the Will?	Harmony	
1990	Over Her Dead Body	Harry	Originally titled Enid Is Sleeping
1991	Zandalee	Thierry Martin	
1992	Near Mrs.	Claude Jobert	Originally titled L'ambassade en folie
1992	Baby on Board	Ernie	
1992	Four Eyes and Six Guns	Ernest	
1993	Bank Robber	Officer Gross	
1994	Beverly Hills Cop III	Sgt. William Rosewood	
1994	The Santa Clause	Dr. Neil Miller	
1997	Last Lives	Merkhan	
1997	Crackerjack 2	Jack Wild	
1997	Family Plan	Jeffrey Chase	
1998	Homegrown	Policeman	
1999	Puss in Boots	Gunther	Direct-to-video
1999	My Brother the Pig	Richard Caldwell	
1999	Walking Across Egypt	Robert Rigsbee	
2000	Big Monster on Campus	Mr. Stein	
2000	Newsbreak	Jake McCallum	
2000	Beethoven's 3rd	Richard Newton	Direct-to-video
2000	Ping!	Louie	
2000	Wild Blue	Ray Walker	
2000	Enemies of Laughter	Sam	
2001	Beethoven's 4th	Richard Newton	Direct-to-video
2001	Mindstorm	Evan Mink	
2001	Hollywood Palm	David	
2001	The Meeksville Ghost	Lucuis C. Meeks	
2001	Betaville	Gen. Efron Norbert	
2002	Whacked!	Peter Klein	
2002	The Santa Clause 2	Dr. Neil Miller	
2002	No Place Like Home	Jack McGregor	
2004	Clifford's Really Big Movie	Larry Gablegobble	Voice
2004	The Hollow	Carl Cranston	
2005	Checking Out	Barry Applebaum	
2006	The Santa Clause 3: The Escape Clause	Dr. Neil Miller	
2008	Swing Vote	Walt	
2009	Dr. Dolittle: Million Dollar Mutts	Network Executive	Direct-to-video
2012	Comics Open	Thadeus Thorogroin III	
2014	I Am Potential	Dr. Greg Byrne	
2015	My Many Sons	Coach Don Meyer	
2015	Highly Functional	Pete	
2017	Bad Grandmas	Harry	
2024	Beverly Hills Cop: Axel F	Det. William "Billy" Rosewood	

== Television ==
Year	Title	Role	Notes
1979	The New Adventures of Wonder Woman	Jeffrey Gordon	Episode: "Amazon Hot Wax"
1979	Survival of Dana	Bear	Television film
1980	Magnum, P.I.	Seaman Wolfe	Episode: "Don't Eat the Snow in Hawaii"
1981	Insight	Bill Cameron	Episode: "A Step Too Slow"
1982	Open All Night	Justin	Episode: "Robin's Return"
1984	A Matter of Sex	Tobe Rasmussen	Television film
1987	The New Homeowner's Guide to Happiness	Paul Darden	Short
1988	Saturday Night Live	Host / Various / Jefferson Davis	Episode: "Judge Reinhold/10,000 Maniacs"
1988	Reach	Bar Patron	Television short
1988	Promised a Miracle	Larry Parker	Television film
1992	Black Magic	Alex Gage	Television film
1992	Four Eyes and Six Guns	Earnest Allbright	Television film
1993	General Motors Playwrights Theater	Michael	Episode: "The Parallax Garden"
1993	Ghostwriter	Brett Pierce	Episode: "Am I Blue?: Part 1"
1994	Lonesome Dove: The Series	Caleb Fowler	Episode: "Wild Horses"
1994	Adventures in Wonderland	Dr. Busbee	Episode: "Take My Tonsilis... Please!"
1994	Seinfeld	Aaron	Episode: "The Raincoats"
1995	As Good as Dead	Ron Holden / Aaron Warfield	Television film
1995	The Wharf Rat	Doc	Television film
1995	Dad, the Angel & Me	Jason Fielder	Television film
1996	Secret Service Guy	Steve Kessler	Main cast (7 episodes)
1996	The Right to Remain Silent	Buford Lowry / Billy Flan	Television film
1996	Special Report: Journey to Mars	Ryan West	Television film
1997	Runaway Car	Ed Lautner	Television film
1998	Ellen	Trevor	Episode: "When Ellen Talks, People Listen"
1998	Floating Away	Lloyd	Television film
1998	Visual Bible for Kids		Television film
1999	NetForce	Will Stiles	Television film
1999	Coming Unglued	Paul Hartwood	Television film
2000	Clerks: The Animated Series	Judge Reinhold	Voice, episode: "A Dissertation on the American Justice System by People Who Have Never Been Inside a Courtroom, Let Alone Know Anything About the Law, but Have Seen Way Too Many Legal Thrillers"
2002	Dead in a Heartbeat	Lt. Tom Royko	Television film
2003	The O'Keefes	Harry O'Keefe	Main cast (8 episodes)
2003	The King of Queens	Dr. Roy Crawford	Episode: "Secret Garden"
2003	National Lampoon's Thanksgiving Family Reunion	Dr. Mitch Snider	Television film
2004	Monk	Alby Drake	Episode: "Mr. Monk and the Blackout"
2004	The Dead Zone	Principal Rowin	Episode: "Cycle of Violence"
2005	Into the West	Douglas Hillman	Miniseries; episode: "Casualties of War"
2005	Teen Titans	Negative Man	Voice, episode: "Homecoming"
2005	The Boondocks	Mr. Uberwitz	Voice, episode: "A Huey Freeman Christmas"
2006	Arrested Development	Himself	Episode: "Fakin' It"
2008–2009	Easy Money	Barry	4 episodes
2016	The Detour	Davey	2 episodes
2017	Four Christmases and a Wedding	Russ Peterson	Television film

== Video games ==
Year	Title	Role
2001	Atlantis: The Lost Empire	Lascoyt
