= Beverly Hills Cop: Axel F (soundtrack) =

Beverly Hills Cop: Axel F (Soundtrack from the Netflix Film)

Film score by Lorne Balfe
- Released: July 3, 2024
- Recorded: 2024
- Genre: Film score
- Length: 41:24
- Label: Netflix Music
- Producer: Lorne Balfe

Lorne Balfe chronology
Bad Boys: Ride or Die (2024)	Beverly Hills Cop: Axel F (Soundtrack from the Netflix Film) (2024)	Slingshot (2024)

Singles from Beverly Hills Cop: Axel F (Soundtrack from the Netflix Film)
- 1. "Axel's Return" Released: June 26, 2024

Beverly Hills Cop: Axel F (Soundtrack from the Netflix Film) is the film score album to the 2024 film Beverly Hills Cop: Axel F, directed by Mark Molloy; the fourth installment in the Beverly Hills Cop film series and a sequel to Beverly Hills Cop III (1994), it starred Eddie Murphy who reprises his role as Axel Foley. The film's musical score is composed by Lorne Balfe who incorporated Harold Faltermeyer's theme "Axel F" from the 1984 film. The soundtrack was released through Netflix Music on July 3, 2024.

== Development ==
Lorne Balfe was announced as the film's composer in December 2023, marking his first score he composed for and the third composer to be involved in the Beverly Hills Cop franchise after the original composer Harold Faltermeyer and Nile Rodgers, who scored the third instalment. He wanted to use the orchestra as an underbelly rather than relying more on it as Rodger's orchestral music for the third film was not well received. To replicate the sound of the first two films scored by Faltermeyer, he assembled a synth orchestra consisting of vintage Roland, Oberheim and Moog synthesizers with synth players recording them at the Sony Scoring Stage. Balfe used most of the synthesizers manufactured in the 1980s to authentically replicate the bygone era; he went to the Vintage Synthesizer Museum in the Highland Park, Los Angeles to source the instruments and find the players who could operate them, so that they could find out the sound, recreate and get back on how it sounded originally.

During production, Molloy used to listen to the soundtrack of the first film to match with the footage he had shot. However, both Balfe and Molloy found it tricky for finding the appropriate soundscape. This resulted him on selecting specific artists and they eventually roped in Sunglasses Kid, an internet personality and musician, after one of Balfe's friends sent him TikTok videos of his performances. Kid eventually performed couple of tracks in the score alongside saxophonist-singer Tim Cappello. Balfe incorporates Faltermeyer's "Axel F" theme throughout the score which was remixed by Phil Harding.

Balfe worked with the representatives from the Musicians at Play whose RISE Diversity Project assisted in producing the score. The executives at Netflix met its co-founder and executive director April Williams (John Williams' sister-in-law) about their involvement in the project, which April added that it would be "a real studio engagement gig for our musicians". Most of the musicians performed the score were high school students, with the youngest being aged 15 and partnered with the mentors in the actual orchestra to guide them in the score production while recording the music at the Sony Scoring Stage.

== Release ==
Beverly Hills Cop: Axel F (Soundtrack from the Netflix Film) was released through Netflix Music on July 3, 2024. The album was preceded by "Axel's Return" as the lead single on June 26, 2024. Lil Nas X wrote and performed the original song "Here We Go!" which was released as a non-album single on June 28.

== Reception ==
Zanobard Reviews rated the album 8/10 calling it as "a fantastic modernization of the original 1984 Faltermeyer classic, reprising the iconic theme to spellbindingly entertaining ’80s effect throughout the album here with an incredible-sounding synthwave and electronic soundscape to boot." Brian Tallerico of RogerEbert.com wrote "Even the score here feels playful as Lorne Balfe incorporates elements of the original Harold Faltermeyer classic into something fresh while also directly using tracks from the massive 1984 soundtrack." Robbie Collin of The Daily Telegraph wrote "Lorne Balfe's synth score is outrageously prominent, with its regular re-workings of Harold Faltermeyer's classic keyboard-prodding theme."

Nate Richard of Collider wrote "Lorne Balfe's synth-heavy score additionally captures those nostalgic vibes without feeling too on the nose." Matt Donato of Paste wrote "Lorne Balfe’s original score masterfully manipulates Harold Faltermeyer’s iconic “Axel F” theme track after track, twisting the bouncy electronic banger into fresh arrangements that are equally as catchy." Chris Bumbray of JoBlo.com wrote "Lorne Balfe’s soundtrack is done in the vein of Harold Faltermeyer, making liberal use of his old themes and plenty of needle drops from the first two movies".

A review from Filmtracks.com however criticized Balfe's work as it lost the spirit of Faltermeyer's scores through the former's "comparatively soulless emulation and modernization".

== Track listing ==
Beverly Hills Cop: Axel F (Soundtrack from the Netflix Film) track listing
No.	Title	Featuring artist(s)	Length
1.	"Beverly Hills Cop: Axel F" (Curnow Harding Remix)	Tim Cappello	2:55
2.	"Snowplough Chase"		2:11
3.	"Junior Bollinger (Contains Axel F)"		1:31
4.	"Meet Jane"		2:13
5.	"Trackers"		4:02
6.	"Wilshire Boulevard (Contains "Bad Guys" From Beverly Hills Cop II)"		3:02
7.	"Bribe Chalino"		2:41
8.	"Axel's Return"	Cappello; Sunglasses Kid	4:10
9.	"Rooftop Escape"		3:54
10.	"Bad Helicopter"		3:43
11.	"Rescue Rosewood"		2:11
12.	"Mansion Shootout"		4:09
13.	"Team Talk (Contains Axel F)"		3:25
14.	"90210 (Contains Axel F)"		1:17
Total length:			41:24

== Charts ==
Chart performance for Beverly Hills Cop: Axel F (Soundtrack from the Netflix Film)
Chart (2024)	Peak position
UK Album Downloads (Official Charts)	68
UK Soundtrack Albums (Official Charts)	26
