= Beverly Hills Cop (franchise) =

American action comedy franchise

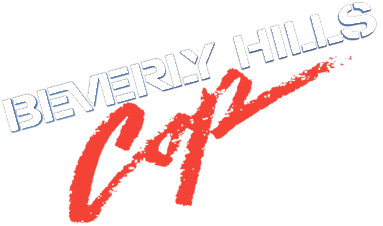
- Logo
- Created by: Danilo Bach; Daniel Petrie Jr.
- Years: 1984–present

Films and television
- Films: Beverly Hills Cop (1984); Beverly Hills Cop II (1987); Beverly Hills Cop III (1994); Beverly Hills Cop: Axel F (2024)

Games
- Video game: Beverly Hills Cop (1990)

Audio
- Soundtracks: Beverly Hills Cop; Beverly Hills Cop II; Beverly Hills Cop III; Beverly Hills Cop: Axel F

Beverly Hills Cop is a film franchise of American action comedy films and an unaired television pilot based on characters created by Daniel Petrie Jr. and Danilo Bach. The films star Eddie Murphy as Axel Foley, a street-smart Detroit cop who travels to Beverly Hills, California to independently investigate a crime connecting the two cities, where he meets Detective Billy Rosewood (Judge Reinhold), Sergeant John Taggart (John Ashton), and Lieutenant Andrew Bogomil (Ronny Cox). While Ashton and Cox do not appear in Beverly Hills Cop III, Murphy and Reinhold are the only actors who appear in all four films. Harold Faltermeyer produced the "Axel F" theme song heard throughout the series. The first three films have been distributed by Paramount Pictures, while Netflix distributed the fourth film. The films have grossed a total of $735 million at the worldwide box office.

A 2013 TV pilot is among several attempts to reboot the franchise following the initial trilogy. In 2024, 40 years after the release of the original film, and 30 years after the release of the third film, a fourth film was released titled Beverly Hills Cop: Axel F. Alongside Murphy, cast members from the previous films returned for the fourth installment, as well as Jerry Bruckheimer, producer of the first two films.

== Films ==
=== Beverly Hills Cop (1984) ===
Axel Foley (Eddie Murphy) is introduced as a Detroit cop who, after the murder of his best friend, travels to California to investigate and track down the killer(s), who he believes operates an art dealership as a cover in Beverly Hills. He teams up with two reluctant detectives from the Beverly Hills Police Department, Billy Rosewood (Judge Reinhold) and John Taggart (John Ashton), who were ordered to keep a watch on him, especially after seeing Foley's differing approach to police work, tactics considered unacceptable by the chief of police.

=== Beverly Hills Cop II (1987) ===
Axel returns to Beverly Hills, after finding out that Captain Andrew Bogomil (Ronny Cox) was shot. He once again teams up with Rosewood and Taggart, who, reluctantly and against incompetent and verbally abusive Police Chief Harold Lutz's (Allen Garfield) orders, assist Foley to find the person responsible for Bogomil's shooting. Axel, Rosewood, and Taggart discover that the alphabet crimes, a series of felonies (robberies and Bogomil's shooting) that have been perpetrated in the area, are masterminded by weapons kingpin Maxwell Dent (Jürgen Prochnow). With this information, the trio set out to find Dent and his lover, Karla Fry (Brigitte Nielsen).

=== Beverly Hills Cop III (1994) ===
Axel returns to Beverly Hills once again. During an assignment, his boss, Inspector Todd (Gil Hill) is killed, and certain evidence points towards an amusement park called "Wonder World". Upon arriving in Beverly Hills, Axel looks up Rosewood, who has attained the title of DDO-JSIOC (deputy director of Joint Special Interdepartmental Operational Command). Taggart has retired and a new detective, Jon Flint (Hector Elizondo), serves as Rosewood's new partner.

=== Beverly Hills Cop: Axel F (2024) ===
A fourth installment was initially announced for release in the mid-1990s, under the helm of Murphy's production company, though this never came to fruition. The project was announced once again to be in development in 2006, with Bruckheimer once again serving as producer. This changed when Lorenzo di Bonaventura stepped in as producer. After various versions of the script had undergone rewrites, Brett Ratner signed on to direct. By July 2008, Michael Brandt and Derek Haas were hired as screenwriters to rewrite the existing script. After the script was completed, it was decided that the story needed another rewrite.

By October 2011, the fourth film was shelved in favor of a television series centered around Axel's son, Aaron (Brandon T. Jackson). Murphy signed on as producer for the series, citing issues with the script as the reason that the film was not being made. In December 2013 after filming a pilot episode, and when CBS passed on a series order, Paramount revived Beverly Hills Cop IV. Ratner was once again hired to serve as director, with Murphy reprising the role of Axel. By May 2014, Josh Appelbaum and André Nemec were hired to write the screenplay. The state of Michigan approved $13.5 million in film incentives, based on an estimated $56.6 million of filmmaker spending in the state. The film, intended to be shot in and around Detroit and was estimated to provide jobs for 352 workers, was originally scheduled for a March 25, 2016, release, but was later pulled due to script concerns.

In June 2016, it was announced that Adil El Arbi and Bilall Fallah were hired to replace Ratner as co-directors. In September 2018, the filmmakers expressed their interest in having Tom Hardy or Channing Tatum cast in supporting roles. In October 2019, Murphy announced that principal photography would commence, once Coming 2 America had finished production. In November 2019, Paramount announced that they had licensed the property to be distributed by Netflix, with options for an additional sequel thereafter. By May 2020, after delays in the filmmaking business caused by the COVID-19 pandemic, Arbi and Fallah confirmed they were still attached and that a new screenwriter was working on a new script. In February 2022, the film entered pre-production and received a California state tax credit of $16,059,000 total. In April 2022, it was announced that Mark Molloy would replace Arbi and Fallah as director of the film. In the same article, Will Beall was announced to have written the screenplay. In August 2022, Jerry Bruckheimer revealed the fourth installment was set to begin filming late August-early September. The same month, Joseph Gordon-Levitt and Taylour Paige were cast. In the same month, Paul Reiser and John Ashton were confirmed to reprise their roles as Det. Jeffrey Friedman and Sgt. John Taggart, respectively. In September 2022, it was confirmed that Judge Reinhold and Bronson Pinchot would reprise their roles as Det. William "Billy" Rosewood and Serge, respectively.

=== Untitled fifth film ===
In June 2024, Eddie Murphy and Jerry Bruckheimer revealed that a fifth Beverly Hills Cop film was already in development.

Film	U.S. release date	Director	Screenwriter(s)	Story by	Producers
Beverly Hills Cop	December 5, 1984	Martin Brest	Daniel Petrie Jr.	Danilo Bach & Daniel Petrie Jr.	Don Simpson & Jerry Bruckheimer
Beverly Hills Cop II	May 20, 1987	Tony Scott	Larry Ferguson & Warren Skaaren	Eddie Murphy & Robert D. Wachs	Don Simpson & Jerry Bruckheimer
Beverly Hills Cop III	May 25, 1994	John Landis	Steven E. de Souza	Steven E. de Souza	Mace Neufeld & Robert Rehme
Beverly Hills Cop: Axel F	July 3, 2024	Mark Molloy	Will Beall, Kevin Etten & Tom Gormican	Will Beall	Chad Oman, Eddie Murphy & Jerry Bruckheimer

== Television ==
CBS ordered a pilot with Brandon T. Jackson starring as Axel Foley's son, Aaron. The hour-long crime drama was produced by writer Shawn Ryan (The Shield, The Chicago Code).

In January 2013, Ryan stated, "It's going to be a CBS procedural. We're going to solve a case every week, but we're going to do it with a lot of humor and a lot of fun. And I would say the stealth thing I would like to get in is, in a day and age when income inequality and class inequities dominate a lot of the country, this is going to be an opportunity to put a young working-class kid in Detroit in the middle of Beverly Hills, you can do a lot of stealth social commentary. My approach is to update it and make it feel modern and 2013. The pilot opens with a 4–5 minute sequence which I think is really harrowing and really dangerous, that would be something that you might have seen on Chicago Code or The Shield. I want it to feel grounded in that way. There'll be some opportunities for laughs after that. It's not a laughs come first show."

In February 2013, Kevin Pollak was cast as Rodney Daloof, an irritating and risk-averse in-house attorney for the Beverly Hills Police Department. David Denman was cast as Brad, an honest and likable but socially awkward detective, formerly a baseball player and a musician. Director Barry Sonnenfeld agreed to both direct the Beverly Hills Cop pilot and serve as an executive producer. In May 2013, CBS decided to pass on the Beverly Hills Cop TV series. In August 2013, Jackson gave his reason about the pass:

I think we were very edgy for CBS. I think we were the edgiest as you could've went for CBS. It would have been like a Fresh Prince thing on CBS, like the edgiest you can go on network TV. But it doesn't agree to our franchise man."

In February 2015, Murphy stated that his cameo appearance in the pilot ironically doomed the show's chances: "I was gonna be in the pilot, and they thought I should be recurring. I'm not gonna do Beverly Hills Cop on TV. I remember when they tested it — they had this little knob that you turn if you like it or you don't like it. So when Axel shows up in the pilot, some people turned the knob so much, they broke it. So the network decided 'if he isn't recurring, then this isn't gonna happen'. So it didn't happen." Four years later, in 2019, Murphy reiterates this statement:

The reason that didn't get picked up was because [the studio] thought that I was going to be in this show, because [the lead] was my son: "And you're going to pop in every now and then". I was like, "I ain't popping in shit". "Well, we ain't making this TV show". I was in the pilot, but they wanted me to be there every week. The pilot was really good. It tested where they have these knobs [that you] turn if you like it. And whenever I came on the screen, Axel Foley would come on the screen, they turned it so they literally broke the knobs on the thing. It was like, "Damn, they breaking knobs?"

In a January 2016 interview, Ryan blamed personality clashes with the network: "The official answer is they decided they liked other pilots better. If you look at what pilots they picked up that year, I think that's kind of incredible. I would say there were a lot of 400 lb. gorillas involved in the show and sometimes the gorillas don't always get along." He also said that he was very proud of the pilot and loved working with Murphy. After CBS passed on ordering the pilot episode to series, Paramount moved on to develop a fourth film instead. In December 2022, the pilot episode was leaked online.

Looking back Director Barry Sonnenfeld said:

The pilot was really good and I really enjoyed working with Eddie Murphy. There were two issues. The pilot wasn't really about Eddie Murphy's character, although he's in it. And he's really funny and really good. But it's about Eddie Murphy's son. But the other big issue, and I can't say I know this for a fact, is the head of CBS [Les Moonves] And the head of Paramount, which was Tom Preston. But Les and Tom did not get along and Les, I think, wanted that job and Tom got it. Whatever. Somehow Les didn't pick up that show in part because he didn't want Tom to have that success. So there were internal politics involved. But the pilot was fantastic and I was really surprised that it didn't get picked up.

== Cast and crew ==
=== Principal cast ===
Character	Films				Television
Character	Beverly Hills Cop	Beverly Hills Cop II	Beverly Hills Cop III	Beverly Hills Cop: Axel F	Beverly Hills Cop
Character	1984	1987	1994	2024	2013
Axel Foley	Eddie Murphy	Eddie Murphy	Eddie Murphy	Eddie Murphy	Eddie Murphy
William "Billy" Rosewood	Judge Reinhold	Judge Reinhold	Judge Reinhold	Judge Reinhold	Judge Reinhold
John Taggart	John Ashton	John Ashton	Mentioned	John Ashton	
Jeffrey Friedman	Paul Reiser	Paul Reiser	Mentioned	Paul Reiser	
Serge	Bronson Pinchot		Bronson Pinchot	Bronson Pinchot	
Inspector Douglas Todd	Gil Hill	Gil Hill	Gil Hill	Gill Hill^{P}	
Andrew Bogomil	Ronny Cox	Ronny Cox		Ronny Cox^{P}	
Jeannette "Jenny" Summers	Lisa Eilbacher				
Chief Hubbard	Stephen Elliott				
Mayor Ted Egan		Robert Ridgely			
Jan Bogomil		Alice Adair			
Janice Perkins			Theresa Randle		
Jon Flint			Héctor Elizondo		
Uncle Dave Thornton			Alan Young		
Jane Foley Jane Saunders				Taylour Paige	
Detective Bobby Abbott				Joseph Gordon-Levitt	
Captain Cade Grant				Kevin Bacon	
Maureen Taggart	Mentioned	Mentioned		Sarah Abrell	
Aaron Foley					Brandon T. Jackson

=== Additional crew ===
Film	Crew/Detail					
Film	Composer	Cinematographer	Editor(s)	Production companies	Distributing company	Running time
Beverly Hills Cop	Harold Faltermeyer	Bruce Surtees	Billy Weber; Arthur Coburn	Paramount Pictures; Eddie Murphy Productions; Don Simpson/Jerry Bruckheimer Films	Paramount Pictures	105 min
Beverly Hills Cop II	Harold Faltermeyer	Jeffrey L. Kimball	Billy Weber; Chris Lebenzon; Michael Tronick	Paramount Pictures; Eddie Murphy Productions; Don Simpson/Jerry Bruckheimer Films	Paramount Pictures	103 min
Beverly Hills Cop III	Nile Rodgers	Mac Ahlberg	Dale Beldin	Paramount Pictures; Eddie Murphy Productions	Paramount Pictures	104 min
Beverly Hills Cop: Axel F	Lorne Balfe	Eduard Grau	Dan Lebental	Eddie Murphy Productions; Don Simpson/Jerry Bruckheimer Films	Netflix	115 min

== Reception ==
=== Box office performance ===
Film	Box office revenue			Box office ranking		Budget	Reference
Film	United States	Other territories	Worldwide	All-time domestic	All-time worldwide	Budget	Reference
Beverly Hills Cop	$234,760,478	$81,600,000	$316,360,478	No. 61 #39^{(A)}	No. 193	$13,000,000	
Beverly Hills Cop II	$153,665,036	$146,300,000	$299,965,036	No. 178 #157^{(A)}	No. 216	$27,000,000	
Beverly Hills Cop III	$42,614,912	$76,594,077	$119,208,989	#2,047	#1,244	$50,000,000	
Beverly Hills Cop: Axel F						$150,000,000	
Total	$431,040,426	$304,494,077	$735,534,503			$240,000,000	
List indicator^{(A)} indicates the adjusted totals based on current ticket prices (by Box Office Mojo).

=== Critical and public response ===
Film	Rotten Tomatoes	Metacritic	CinemaScore
Beverly Hills Cop	83% (52 reviews)	66 (10 reviews)	—N/a
Beverly Hills Cop II	48% (40 reviews)	48 (11 reviews)	A-
Beverly Hills Cop III	11% (56 reviews)	16 (15 reviews)	B
Beverly Hills Cop: Axel F	66% (165 reviews)	55 (44 reviews)	—N/a

=== Accolades ===
Beverly Hills Cop

- Academy Awards
  - nominated for Best Writing (Original Screenplay) – Danilo Bach and Daniel Petrie Jr.
- British Academy Film Awards
  - Nominated for Best Score – Harold Faltermeyer
- Golden Globe Awards
  - Nominated for Best Motion Picture – Musical or Comedy
  - Nominated for Best Actor – Motion Picture Musical or Comedy – Eddie Murphy

Beverly Hills Cop II

- Academy Awards
  - Nominated for Best Original Song for "Shakedown" – Harold Faltermeyer, Keith Forsey and Bob Seger
- Golden Globe Awards
  - Nominated for Best Original Song for "Shakedown" – Harold Faltermeyer, Keith Forsey, and Bob Seger
- Golden Raspberry Awards
  - Winner for Worst Original Song for "I Want Your Sex" – George Michael

Beverly Hills Cop III

- Golden Raspberry Awards
  - Nominated for Worst Director – John Landis
  - Nominated for Worst Remake or Sequel

== Music ==
=== Soundtracks ===
Title	U.S. release date	Length	Label
Beverly Hills Cop: Original Motion Picture Soundtrack	December 1984	39:14	MCA Records
Beverly Hills Cop II: The Motion Picture Soundtrack Album	May 18, 1987	45:14	MCA Records
Beverly Hills Cop III: Original Motion Picture Soundtrack	May 10, 1994	41:20	MCA Records
Beverly Hills Cop: Axel F (Soundtrack from the Netflix Film)	July 3, 2024	41:24	Netflix Music

=== Singles ===
- "Axel F"
- "The Heat Is On"
- "Neutron Dance"
- "New Attitude"
- "Stir It Up"
- "Cross My Broken Heart"
- "I Want Your Sex"
- "Shakedown"
- "Luv 4 Dem Gangsta'z"
- "The Right Kinda Lover"
- "Axel's Return"

== In other media ==
=== Novelization ===
1987: Robert Tine: Beverly Hills Cop II: A Novel, Pocket; Media Tie In edition, ISBN 978-0671645212

=== Video games ===
==== Beverly Hills Cop (1990 video game) ====
In 1990, Tynesoft released a loose adaptation of the first movie for the Commodore 64, ZX Spectrum, BBC Micro, Amstrad CPC, Amiga, Atari ST, and MS-DOS.

==== Beverly Hills Cop (2006 video game) ====
The second title based on the franchise is a first-person shooter developed by Atomic Planet Entertainment and published by Blast! Entertainment. It was released in Europe in 2006 for the PlayStation 2. The players take control of Axel Foley over six missions and make use of six weapons, such as pistol, machine gun and shotgun. Writing for WhatCulture, Padraig Cotter said the game was a "poorly designed mess, with horrible stealth sections you can fail for no clear reason, appalling AI, a paltry number of levels and fiddly shooting mechanics." Zach Ames of smosh.com listed Beverly Hills Cop at #2 on his list "5 Video Games Based On Movies That Make No Sense". His criticism of the game notes that the game does not use Eddie Murphy's likeness for Foley's model. Jeff Gerstmann of Giant Bomb referred to the game as "the 9/11 of video games".

== See also ==
- The main theme music for the series titled "Axel F", which was composed by Harold Faltermeyer, was covered and remixed by Crazy Frog.
- In the NTSF:SD:SUV:: episode, titled "Wasilla Hills Cop" is a reference to the movie franchise.
