= Gil Hill =

American politician, police detective and actor (1931–2016)

Gilbert R. Hill
- Hill as "Inspector Todd" in the 1984 film Beverly Hills Cop.
- Born: Gilbert Roland Hill; November 5, 1931; Birmingham, Alabama. U.S.
- Died: February 29, 2016 (aged 84); Detroit, Michigan, U.S.
- Occupations: Politician, police officer, actor
- Years active: 1984–1994
- Political party: Democratic
- Spouse: Delores Hooks (m. 1955; died 2015)

Gilbert Roland Hill (November 5, 1931 – February 29, 2016) was an American politician, police officer, and actor, who was the President of the Detroit City Council. He gained recognition for his role as Inspector Todd in the Beverly Hills Cop film series. He was the runner-up in the 2001 Detroit mayoral election, losing to Kwame Kilpatrick.

== Biography ==
=== Early life ===
Born in Birmingham, Alabama, Hill was the son of Mary Lee Hill, who raised him and his sister Toni, alone. In the 1940s, Hill moved with his mother and sister to Washington, D.C. Hill attended Cardozo High School, graduating in 1949. Hill had wished to attend Howard University, but was not able due to strained financial resources.

Instead, Hill joined the United States Air Force in 1950 and was stationed at Selfridge Air Force Base near Detroit. After leaving the Air Force in 1953, he returned to the Detroit area, where he worked a number of jobs for the next four years.

=== Law enforcement career ===
Hill joined the Wayne County Sheriff's Department in 1957, but quickly became disillusioned with the slow pace, so he joined the Detroit Police Department in 1959. In 1969 he was promoted to detective and was assigned to the homicide division the following year. Over the next decade, Hill rose to national attention for his ability to obtain confessions out of the most notorious killers. He was part of the law enforcement task force of over 100 agents in the investigation surrounding the Atlanta Child Murders in 1979.

Hill was promoted to the rank of Inspector in charge of the Homicide Division by 1982, and in 1989, retired from the Detroit Police Department at the rank of Commander.

In 2016, former hit man Nate "Boone" Craft alleged that Hill had once offered to pay him $125,000 to kill Richard Wershe Jr., to keep Wershe from revealing alleged corruption in the Detroit police department.

=== Political career ===
Following his retirement from police work he became a councilman for Detroit, becoming its president in 1997, and ran unsuccessfully for mayor against Kwame Kilpatrick in 2001. He was initially considered to be the leading candidate and had support from many people connected with incumbent mayor Dennis Archer.. In 2019, a portrait of Hill was unveiled at the Coleman A. Young Municipal Center in downtown Detroit, a tradition carried out for all former City Council Presidents. Kilpatrick won with 54% of the vote (98,124 votes) to Hill’s 46% (82,484 votes), with 88% of precincts reporting and 47% of absentee ballots outstanding. Later Kilpatrick resigned as mayor in September 2008 after being convicted of perjury and obstruction of justice. He was sentenced to four months in jail and was released on probation after serving 99 days.

=== Acting career ===
Already a prominent figure in law enforcement, Hill appeared in the Beverly Hills Cop films, playing the role of Inspector Todd, the boss of Eddie Murphy's character, Axel Foley. Offered other acting work after the film's release, Hill declined to pursue acting as a career, but did appear in the two subsequent sequels to the film, saying that the only difference between his famous character's life and his own was that he did not curse as much in real life.

==== Inspector Douglas Todd in the Beverly Hills Cop film series ====
As a real-life Detroit police detective, Hill landed the role of Inspector Douglas Todd in the Beverly Hills Cop film series through a serendipitous encounter with the film's director, Martin Brest. While Brest was scouting locations in Detroit for the first film in 1984, Hill was assigned to show him around the city due to his role as head of the Detroit Police Department's homicide division. During this tour, Brest, on a whim, asked Hill to read a few lines from the script.

In the fourth film, Beverly Hills Cop: Axel F, Hill and actor Ronny Cox, the latter of whom portrayed Chief Bogomil in the first two movies, are shown in photographs.

=== Personal life and death ===
Hill married Dolores Hooks, who sang in a local church choir, in 1955. They remained married until her death in 2015. They had two sons and a daughter.

Hill died from pneumonia at the age of 84 on February 29, 2016, at DMC Sinai-Grace Hospital in Detroit, Michigan. He was survived by his three children, three grandchildren, and two great grandchildren. Tributes poured in upon his death from then Detroit mayor Mike Duggan, and the Wayne County Sheriff Benny Napoleon.

== Filmography ==
Year	Title	Role	Notes
1984	Beverly Hills Cop	Inspector Douglas Todd	
1987	Beverly Hills Cop II	Inspector Douglas Todd	
1994	Beverly Hills Cop III	Inspector Douglas Todd	(final film role)
2024	Beverly Hills Cop: Axel F	Archive photo	

Hill also appeared as himself in the documentary, White Boy, in which details were revealed of alleged corruption during his time as a Detroit law enforcement officer.

== Sources ==
- People Jan. 7, 1985
