= Beverly Hills Cop =

1984 film directed by Martin Brest

- Theatrical release poster
- Directed by: Martin Brest
- Screenplay by: Daniel Petrie Jr.
- Story by: Danilo Bach; Daniel Petrie Jr.
- Produced by: Don Simpson; Jerry Bruckheimer
- Starring: Eddie Murphy
- Cinematography: Bruce Surtees
- Edited by: Billy Weber; Arthur Coburn
- Music by: Harold Faltermeyer
- Production companies: Paramount Pictures; Don Simpson/Jerry Bruckheimer Films; Eddie Murphy Productions
- Distributed by: Paramount Pictures
- Release dates: December 1, 1984 (Los Angeles); December 5, 1984 (United States)
- Running time: 105 minutes
- Country: United States
- Language: English
- Budget: $13 million
- Box office: $316.4 million

Beverly Hills Cop is a 1984 American action comedy film directed by Martin Brest, with a screenplay by Daniel Petrie Jr., and story by Danilo Bach and Daniel Petrie Jr. It stars Eddie Murphy as Axel Foley, a street-smart Detroit detective who visits Beverly Hills, California, to solve the murder of his best friend. Judge Reinhold, John Ashton, Lisa Eilbacher, Ronny Cox, Steven Berkoff, Jonathan Banks, and Paul Reiser appear in supporting roles.

The film was released theatrically in the United States on December 5, 1984, by Paramount Pictures. An immediate blockbuster, it received positive reviews and grossed $316.4 million worldwide, making it the highest-grossing film released of 1984 in the US. The film shot Murphy to international stardom, won the People's Choice Award for Favorite Motion Picture, and was nominated for both the Golden Globe Award for Best Motion Picture – Musical or Comedy and Academy Award for Best Original Screenplay in 1985. Beverly Hills Cop spawned a franchise that includes three sequels, beginning with Beverly Hills Cop II (1987).

In December 2024, around the time of the film's 40th anniversary and three months after cast member John Ashton's death, the film was selected for preservation in the United States' National Film Registry by the Library of Congress as being "culturally, historically, or aesthetically significant".

== Plot ==
Axel Foley is a plainclothes Detroit police detective whose latest unauthorized sting operation goes sour when two uniformed officers intervene, resulting in a high-speed chase through the city that causes widespread damage. Axel's superior, Inspector Douglas Todd, reprimands Axel and informs him that despite his potential to be a great detective, Axel's reckless behavior will cost him his job if it continues. Todd then sends Axel home.

Axel arrives at his apartment to find it has been broken into by his childhood friend, Michael "Mikey" Tandino. Mikey had done prison time for a car theft the pair had committed in their youth, but has since landed a job as a security guard in Beverly Hills thanks to mutual friend Jenny Summers. Mikey reveals he has some German bearer bonds but does not explain how he obtained them. Returning to the apartment after going to a bar, Axel and Mikey are taken by surprise by two men, Zack and Casey, who knock Axel unconscious, confront Mikey about the bonds, and murder him.

Due to Axel's close friendship with Mikey, and another detective already being assigned to Mikey's murder, Inspector Todd forbids Axel from assisting with the case. Axel asks to go on vacation, which Todd allows, but he warns Axel that if he tries to get involved with the Tandino case, he will be fired. Under the guise of vacation, Axel travels to Beverly Hills to investigate Mikey's murder. Jenny tells Axel about Mikey's ties to Victor Maitland, owner of the art gallery she works for. Axel goes to Maitland's office to question him about Mikey, but is ejected by Maitland's bodyguards and arrested.

Axel meets Beverly Hills Police Department Lieutenant Andrew Bogomil, as well as Detective Billy Rosewood and Sergeant John Taggart. Bogomil tells Axel that he has spoken with Inspector Todd and reminds Axel of Todd's warning about investigating the Tandino murder. Bogomil then assigns Billy and Taggart to follow Axel, who humiliates them with various pratfalls, including one that disables their car's exhaust with bananas. Billy and Taggart's initial dislike of Axel changes to mutual respect when they cooperatively foil a robbery at a strip club.

Axel infiltrates one of Maitland's warehouses, where he finds evidence of drug smuggling and is arrested after a scuffle with Zack at Maitland's country club. Beverly Hills Police Chief Hubbard, who has learned of Axel's private investigation, orders him escorted out of town. Axel convinces Billy to take him and Jenny to the warehouse, where he expects another shipment to arrive. Axel and Jenny break in and discover several bags of cocaine but are discovered by Maitland, Zack, and Casey. Maitland takes Jenny and orders Axel killed before admitting to Mikey's murder. Billy rescues Axel after a brief gunfight during which he kills Casey.

To rescue Jenny, Taggart tracks Axel and Billy to Maitland's estate where they kill four of Maitland's men, including Zack. Axel kills Maitland with Bogomil's help. Bogomil fabricates an explanation for their unauthorized actions to Chief Hubbard. Realizing Inspector Todd might fire him upon his return to Detroit, Axel asks Bogomil to smooth matters over with Todd, remarking that if he gets fired in Detroit, then he might stay in Beverly Hills as a private investigator. Bogomil agrees to talk to Inspector Todd.

Taggart and Billy pay Axel's hotel bill for him and they agree to a farewell drink together.

== Cast ==
- Eddie Murphy as Detective Axel Foley
- Judge Reinhold as Detective Billy Rosewood
- John Ashton as Sergeant John Taggart
- Lisa Eilbacher as Jenny Summers
- Ronny Cox as Lieutenant Andrew Bogomil
- Steven Berkoff as Victor Maitland
- James Russo as Mikey Tandino
- Jonathan Banks as Zack
- Stephen Elliott as Chief Hubbard
- Gilbert R. Hill as Inspector Douglas Todd
- Bronson Pinchot as Serge
- Paul Reiser as Detective Jeffrey Friedman
- Michael Champion as Casey
- Frank Pesce as cigarette buyer
- Damon Wayans as banana man
- Rex Ryon as bonded warehouse security guard
- Martin Brest as Beverly Palms Hotel checkout clerk (uncredited)

== Production ==
=== Development and writing ===
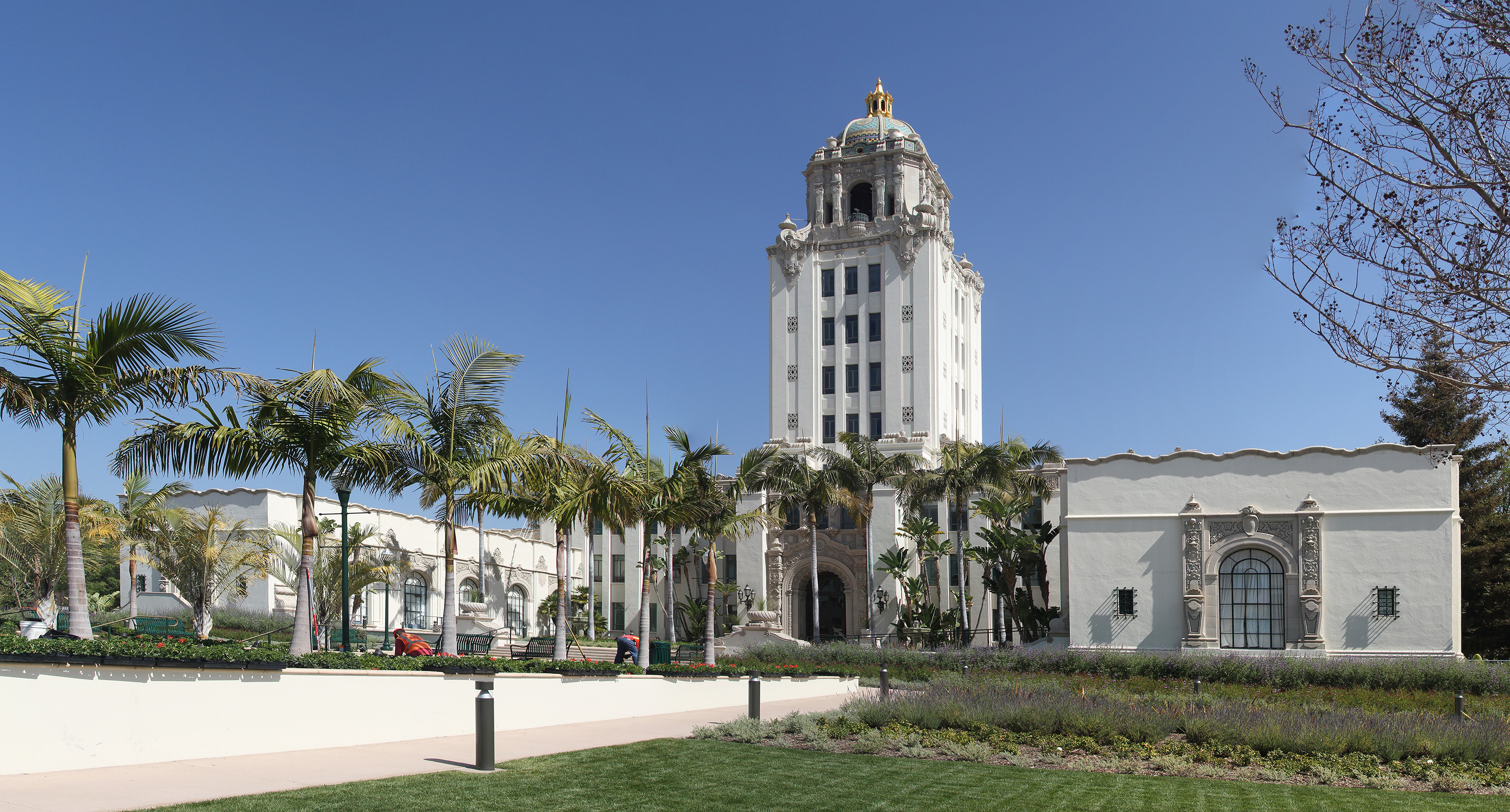
The Beverly Hills City Hall featured prominently in the Beverly Hills Cop films as the police headquarters.

In 1977, Paramount Pictures executive Don Simpson came up with a film idea about a police officer from East Los Angeles who transferred to Beverly Hills. Screenwriter Danilo Bach was called in to write the screenplay. Bach pitched his idea to Simpson and Paramount in 1981 under the name Beverly Drive, about a cop from Pittsburgh named Elly Axel. However, his script was a straight action film and Bach was forced to make changes to the script, but after a few attempts the project went stale. With the success of Flashdance (1983), Simpson saw the Beverly Hills film as his next big project.

Daniel Petrie Jr. was brought in to rewrite the script and Paramount loved Petrie's humorous approach to the project, with the lead character now called Axel Elly, from Detroit. Jeremy Friedman was named after Jeffrey Katzenberg. Producer Jerry Bruckheimer claimed that the role of Axel Foley was first offered to Mickey Rourke, who signed a $400,000 holding contract to do the film. When revisions and other preparations took longer than expected, Rourke left the project to do another film. Martin Scorsese was offered to direct the film but turned it down as he felt that the film's concept was too similar to Coogan's Bluff (1968). David Cronenberg was also offered to direct the film but also turned it down.

Sylvester Stallone was originally cast as Foley. Stallone gave the script a dramatic rewrite, removing all the story's humor and turning the film back into a standard action film. In one of the previous drafts written for Stallone, the character of Billy Rosewood was called "Siddons" and was killed off half-way through the script during one of the action scenes. Stallone had renamed the lead character to Axel Cobretti, with the character of Michael Tandino being his brother and Jenny Summers playing his love interest.

Stallone has said that his script for Beverly Hills Cop would have "looked like the opening scene from Saving Private Ryan (1998) on the beaches of Normandy. Believe it or not, the finale was me in a stolen Lamborghini playing chicken with an oncoming freight train being driven by the ultra-slimy bad guy." Producer Don Simpson let it be known they did not want to move forward with Stallone's revisions; since Stallone was not willing to negotiate the rewrite, Simpson asked writer Charles "Chip" Proser if he could return the script to previous iteration, while leaving most of Stallone's character revisions intact. However, Proser found the task (and turnaround time) preposterous.

"They offered me the rewrite when it was nothing more than Sylvester Stallone and an exotic gun—which was pretty ridiculous", remembered screenwriter Chip Proser, who would later write [an uncredited rewrite of] Simpson and Bruckheimer's Top Gun (1986).

According to co-producer Don Simpson, Stallone's new script spent too much time on the star 'soaping down his muscles.' Stallone ultimately dropped out two weeks before filming was to start, ostensibly to concentrate on Rhinestone (1984), his next picture. Stallone later used the bulk of these ideas as the basis for the 1986 film Cobra.

Don Simpson would later tell friends a story—impossible to corroborate—about how he finally got Stallone off the project and got the project back on track: He and Stallone had a mutual interest in "youth treatments" and Simpson knew of a Swiss doctor who was experimenting with injections of a sheep hormone that increased tumescence. Simpson managed to get Stallone's name "put at the top of the list", Simpson boasted to a friend, for an appointment with the very exclusive doctor. Stallone flew to Switzerland, and Simpson promptly continued working on Beverly Hills Cop without him.

Two days later, the film's producers, Simpson and Bruckheimer, convinced Eddie Murphy to replace Stallone in the film, prompting more rewrites as Murphy felt the original script "was not funny". Besides Stallone and Rourke, other actors who were considered for the role of Axel Foley included Richard Pryor, Al Pacino, and James Caan. Harrison Ford was offered the role of Axel Foley but turned it down. The final shooting draft of the script, which was extensively revised with Murphy's input, was not completed until the day production began.

=== Filming ===
The film was budgeted at $14 million, including $4 million for Murphy, and was completed for around $13 million. Production began in May 1984 and continued into the summer, taking place mostly in and around Los Angeles. The opening sequence was filmed over several days in Michigan, in Detroit and nearby Wayne. Many scenes set in Beverly Hills were shot in Pasadena, as the city of Beverly Hills prohibited filming after 10:30 p.m.

== Music ==
=== Soundtrack ===
The soundtrack was released on MCA Records and won the Grammy Award for Best Score Soundtrack for Visual Media (1986). It featured three top 10 singles on the Billboard Hot 100, the instrumental title tune, "Axel F", composed and performed by Harold Faltermeyer, the Glenn Frey song "The Heat Is On", and "Neutron Dance," performed by the Pointer Sisters. The soundtrack also had two Patti LaBelle hits, "New Attitude", which reached the top twenty on the US, and the Grammy Award-winning "Stir It Up".

== Reception ==
=== Box office ===
Beverly Hills Cop grossed $234.8 million in the United States and Canada, and $81.6 million in other territories, for a worldwide total of $316.4 million.

The film was released in the United States on December 5, 1984, in 1,532 theaters. It debuted in first place at the US box office, making $15.2 million in its first five days of release. It expanded on December 21 into 2,006 theatres. The film stayed at number one for 13 consecutive weeks and returned to number one in its 15th weekend making 14 non-consecutive weeks at number one, tying Tootsie for the film with the most weeks at number one.

The film became the highest-grossing film of 1984 in the US. Adjusted for inflation, it is the 13th highest-grossing R-rated film of all time. For nearly two decades, Beverly Hills Cop held the record for having the highest domestic gross for an R-rated film until 2003, when it was taken by The Matrix Reloaded. Box Office Mojo estimates that the film sold over 67 million tickets in the US.

=== Critical response ===
On the review aggregator website Rotten Tomatoes, the film holds an approval rating of 83% based on 58 critics. The website's critics consensus reads, "The buddy cop movie continues its evolution unabated with this Eddie Murphy vehicle that is fast, furious, and funny." Metacritic, which uses a weighted average, assigned the film a score of 66 out of 100, based on 12 critics, indicating "generally favorable" reviews.

Janet Maslin of The New York Times wrote "Beverly Hills Cop finds Eddie Murphy doing what he does best: playing the shrewdest, hippest, fastest-talking underdog in a rich man's world. Eddie Murphy knows exactly what he's doing, and he wins at every turn."

Richard Schickel of Time magazine wrote that "Eddie Murphy exuded the kind of cheeky, cocky charm that has been missing from the screen since Cagney was a pup, snarling his way out of the ghetto." Axel Foley became Murphy's signature role and was ranked No. 78 on Empire magazine's list of "The 100 Greatest Movie Characters". In 2008, Entertainment Weekly magazine ranked Beverly Hills Cop as the third best comedy film since 1983. According to Christopher Hitchens, British novelist and poet Kingsley Amis considered the film "a flawless masterpiece".

John Simon of National Review called Beverly Hills Cop "a truly contemptible film". Gene Siskel and Roger Ebert were also negative, giving the film "Two Thumbs Down" for "wasting a good pretext and cast on an idiotic plotline."

In 2003, the film was included on The New York Times' list of "The 1,000 Best Movies Ever Made".

Beverly Hills Cop is in the permanent collection of the Museum of Modern Art.

=== Home media ===
Beverly Hills Cop released on VHS, Betamax And LaserDisc on October 30, 1985, In the United States, the film has shipped over 1.3 million VHS Copies in its international release, A collectors edition DVD released on January 29, 2002, a Blu-Ray Released on May 17, 2011, And A 4K Ultra HD Blu-Ray Release On December 1, 2020

=== Accolades ===
Award	Category	Recipient(s)	Result
Academy Awards	Best Original Screenplay	Danilo Bach and Daniel Petrie Jr.	Nominated
British Academy Film Awards	Best Score	Harold Faltermeyer	Nominated
Edgar Allan Poe Awards	Best Motion Picture Screenplay	Daniel Petrie Jr.	Nominated
Golden Globes	Best Motion Picture – Musical or Comedy	Beverly Hills Cop	Nominated
Golden Globes	Best Actor in a Motion Picture – Musical or Comedy	Eddie Murphy	Nominated
Grammy Awards	Best Score Soundtrack Album	Marc Benno, Harold Faltermeyer, Keith Forsey, Micki Free, Jon Gilutin, Howard Hewett, Bunny Hull, Howie Rice, Sharon Robinson, Danny Sembello, Sue Sheridan, Richard Theisen, Allee Willis	Won
Online Film & Television Association Awards	Hall of Fame – Motion Picture	Beverly Hills Cop	Inducted
People's Choice Awards	Favorite Motion Picture	Beverly Hills Cop	Won
Stuntman Awards	Best Vehicular Stunt (Motion Picture)	Eddy Donno	Won

- This film is No. 22 on Bravo's list of the "100 Funniest Movies of All Time".

American Film Institute lists

- AFI's 100 Years...100 Laughs – No. 63

== Sequels ==
The film spawned a film series with three sequels, Beverly Hills Cop II (1987), Beverly Hills Cop III (1994), and Beverly Hills Cop: Axel F (2024), all starring Murphy. Judge Reinhold reprised his role for the sequels. John Ashton returned for the second and fourth film, but not third. The second film met with mixed reviews but was a box office success, while the third film was unsuccessful, both critically and commercially.

In 2013, a television series was reported to be in the works for CBS. The pilot was written by Shawn Ryan and directed by Barry Sonnenfeld. Brandon T. Jackson was cast as Axel Foley's son. The series was not picked up, but Ryan reported that it tested well enough for Paramount to put a fourth film into production.

On November 14, 2019, Deadline Hollywood announced that Paramount Pictures made a one-time license deal with an option for a sequel to Netflix to create the fourth film. In April 2022, Mark Molloy was announced as the film's director, while Will Beall penned the script. The fourth film, Beverly Hills Cop: Axel F, was released on Netflix on July 3, 2024.
