= Beverly Hills Cop (1990 video game) =

- Developer: Tynesoft
- Publisher: Tynesoft
- Platforms: Amiga, Amstrad CPC, Atari ST, BBC Micro, Commodore 64, MS-DOS, ZX Spectrum
- Release: WW: 1990
- Genres: Action, racing

Beverly Hills Cop is a video game developed by Tynesoft and published in 1990. The story is loosely based on the 1984 film Beverly Hills Cop. The player controls Axel Foley in four distinct sub-games: a side-scrolling action game, a driving game, an overhead view shooter, and a first person shooter. The game was released on Commodore 64, ZX Spectrum, BBC Micro, Amstrad CPC, Amiga, Atari ST, and MS-DOS. The BBC version only contains the driving game.

== Reception ==
Reception

Review scores
Publication	Score		
Publication	Amiga	Atari ST	C64
The Games Machine (UK)	57%	55%	48%
Zzap!64	42%	N/A	68%

The reviewers of Zzap!64 thought the Commodore 64 version was not particularly well executed with "passable" graphics and sound, but provided "a lot of variety" making it "quite good value for money". The overall rating given was 68%.

The game was also reviewed in the magazine The Games Machine. They commented that the game's plot "bears absolutely no relation to the film storyline", the Commodore 64 version was graphically and sonically weak, and the Amiga and Atari ST releases were also poor, with an Axel Foley character that looked more like Daley Thompson.

In 2006, Abandonware website Abandonia's Sebatianos reviewed Beverly Hills Cop with "All in all the game is OK, but the animation is far from smooth. You'll have problems reading the text, because it will shake too much and the animation (especially on level one) is very choppy."
