= 14 Hours (2005 film) =

- Promotional movie poster
- Written by: Danilo Bach
- Directed by: Gregg Champion
- Starring: JoBeth Williams; Ricky Schroder; Kris Kristofferson
- Theme music composer: Joseph Conlan
- Country of origin: United States
- Original language: English

Production
- Producers: Frances Croke Page; Shanna Nussbaum
- Cinematography: Gordon Lonsdale
- Editor: Gib Jaffe
- Running time: 95 minutes

Original release
- Network: TNT
- Release: April 3, 2005

14 Hours is a 2005 medical emergency docudrama starring JoBeth Williams, Kris Kristofferson and Ricky Schroder. The film was set in Houston, Texas and filmed in Vancouver, Canada. The film premiered on TNT on April 3, 2005. Based on true-life events surrounding Tropical Storm Allison in 2001, the film was released internationally on DVD by Paramount Pictures. 14 Hours was produced through Cosmic Entertainment, which counts Kurt Russell, Goldie Hawn, Oliver Hudson and Kate Hudson as its principals, and sponsored by Johnson & Johnson. The Decades channel aired this movie in March 2017.

== Cast ==
- JoBeth Williams as Jeanette Makins
- Kris Kristofferson as Chuck Whortle
- Kirsten Robek as Nurse Lily
- Kevin McNulty as Larry Dastych
- Jason Schombing as Bronson
- Rick Schroder as Dr. Foster
- Kim Roberts as Helen
- Karin Konoval as Dr. Estrada
- Simone Bailly as Phoebe
- Rick Dobran as Gary

== Backstory ==
Houston native JoBeth Williams weathered her share of tropical storm and hurricane conditions as a child. Her mother worked as a dietician at Memorial-Herrmann (the Houston-area hospital where 14 Hours is set) for 18 years. The premature infant depicted in the film was inspired in part by the real-life experience of Zachary Jackson, who was born prematurely and required life-support equipment. During a major storm-related power outage, his survival was threatened when hospital systems failed while he weighed approximately 2.5 pounds (1.1 kilogram). Jackson later recovered and is now a healthy adult living in the Houston metropolitan area. His early medical experience influenced his mother's subsequent work in engineering solutions aimed at improving care and safety for infants and young children, including those in intensive care units. The producers were inspired by the Reader's Digest article "BLACKOUT" by Peter Michelmore published in April 2002.
