= Beverly Hills Cop III =

1994 American action comedy film by John Landis

- Theatrical release poster
- Directed by: John Landis
- Written by: Steven E. de Souza
- Based on: Characters by: Danilo Bach and; Daniel Petrie, Jr.
- Produced by: Mace Neufeld; Robert Rehme
- Starring: Eddie Murphy; Judge Reinhold; Héctor Elizondo; Timothy Carhart; John Saxon; Alan Young
- Cinematography: Mac Ahlberg
- Edited by: Dale Beldin
- Music by: Nile Rodgers
- Production companies: Neufeld/Rehme Productions; Eddie Murphy Productions
- Distributed by: Paramount Pictures
- Release date: May 25, 1994
- Running time: 104 minutes
- Country: United States
- Language: English
- Budget: $40–70 million
- Box office: $119 million

Beverly Hills Cop III is a 1994 American action comedy film starring Eddie Murphy. The third film in the Beverly Hills Cop franchise, it was written by Steven E. de Souza and directed by John Landis. Murphy again plays Detroit detective Axel Foley, who returns to Beverly Hills and teams up with detective Billy Rosewood (Judge Reinhold) to stop a gang of counterfeiters at a local amusement park called WonderWorld.

The film features a number of cameo appearances by well-known film personalities, including Robert B. Sherman, Arthur Hiller, John Singleton, Joe Dante, Barbet Schroeder, Peter Medak, special effects legend Ray Harryhausen and George Lucas as a ride patron. It is also the only film in the series not to involve producers Don Simpson and Jerry Bruckheimer, who opted out of the film's production due to budgetary disagreements.

Beverly Hills Cop III was released on May 25, 1994, by Paramount Pictures. The film was panned by critics, and was considered by Murphy himself as the weakest film in the series. The film also underperformed at the box office, grossing $119 million against a $40–70 million budget. A sequel, titled Beverly Hills Cop: Axel F, was released on Netflix on July 3, 2024.

== Plot ==
Seven years after the events from the second film, Detroit Police Department detective Axel Foley plans to arrest a car-theft ring at a chop shop. Unbeknownst to his superior, Inspector G. Douglas Todd, Axel cancels his SWAT backup; planning to use only his team for the raid.

Meanwhile, a group of four men arrive at the chop shop to pick up a stolen box truck; the leader of the group confirms that the truck still has its cargo—crates apparently belonging to the U.S. government—then has his men execute the car thieves. The group prepares to leave when Axel and his team launch their raid, but are outgunned. Todd, arriving moments later, is killed by the group's leader. When the group flees in the box truck, Axel gives chase but is intercepted by Secret Service Agent Steve Fulbright. He informs Axel that the killer must remain on the loose because the federal government is pursuing a larger scheme in which he is involved.

After Todd's funeral, Axel learns that several clues left behind by the killers point to WonderWorld; a theme park in Beverly Hills, California, owned by "Uncle Dave" Thornton. Axel arrives in Beverly Hills and reunites with his friend Billy Rosewood, now promoted to "Deputy Director of Operations for Joint Systems Interdepartmental Operational Command" (DDO-JSIOC) and meets Jon Flint, Billy's new partner after John Taggart's retirement. Flint calls his friend Ellis DeWald, head of WonderWorld's park security, to let him know that Axel is coming to the park for his investigation.

Axel befriends park employee Janice Perkins while touring the park's behind-the-scenes facilities. He is observed by security, then shot at and attacked hand-to-hand. Axel retreats to the surface, where he cuts in line to enter the Spider Ferris wheel ride. Axel rescues two children from the Spider after the guards accidentally jam the ride and is brought to park manager Orrin Sanderson. When DeWald is called in to contest Axel's claim that he was attacked by the security guards without prior challenge, Axel recognizes DeWald as Todd's killer but Rosewood and Flint refuse to believe him because of DeWald's impeccable public reputation.

Later, Axel is visited in his motel room by Uncle Dave and Janice. They inform him that the WonderWorld park's designer and Uncle Dave's close friend - Roger Frye - has mysteriously disappeared while inspecting the grounds two weeks earlier, leaving only a letter with a cryptic message. Axel and Rosewood attend a banquet to honor DeWald as private law-enforcement officer of the year and meet Axel's old friend Serge. Axel tries to heckle DeWald into revealing his criminal activities but DeWald resists Axel's attempts.

Later, Axel digs deeper into a closed-off section of the park and learns DeWald and Sanderson are using WonderWorld as a front for a counterfeiting ring. DeWald was at the chop shop in Detroit to collect mint paper stored in the truck. That evening, Axel meets with Uncle Dave to ask him about further details to find a piece of viable evidence and discovers that Frye's warning letter is actually written on a sheet of the stolen mint paper. Before he can make use of that evidence, Uncle Dave is shot and wounded by DeWald and Axel is framed for his shooting.

After getting away from DeWald and bringing Uncle Dave to a hospital, Axel sets out to prove his innocence by storming the park; calling Rosewood and Flint to assist him. The ensuing shootout kills the rest of DeWald's henchmen and leaves Axel, Rosewood and Flint injured; after a hand-to-hand fight Axel kills DeWald, avenging Todd.

In the meantime, Sanderson is killed by Agent Fulbright; who then appears before Axel to explain that he was right. Axel realizes that Agent Fulbright is involved with the counterfeiters, so he fatally shoots him after a brief struggle. Later, Axel, Rosewood and Flint attend a special event at WonderWorld; where Uncle Dave—having made a full recovery—thanks Axel for his assistance by creating a new character for WonderWorld with his name—"Axel Fox"—while Axel begins a relationship with Janice.

== Cast ==
- Eddie Murphy as Detective Axel Foley
- Judge Reinhold as Sergeant Billy Rosewood
- Hector Elizondo as Detective Jon Flint
- Timothy Carhart as Ellis DeWald
- John Saxon as Orrin Sanderson
- Theresa Randle as Janice Perkins
- Alan Young as Uncle Dave Thornton
- Stephen McHattie as Secret Service Agent Steve Fulbright
- Bronson Pinchot as Serge
- Gil Hill as Inspector Douglas Todd
- Jon Tenney as Detective Levine
- Lindsey Ginter as Holloway
- Dan Martin as Cooper
- Al Green as Minister
- Joey Travolta as Giolito
- Hattie Winston as Mrs. Todd
- Helen Martin as Grandma
- Tracy Melchior as Ticket Booth Lady
- Eugene Collier as Leppert
- Forry Smith as Rondy
- Gregory McKinney as Kimbrough
- David Parry as Taddeo
- Louis Lombardi as Snake
- Fred Asparagus as Bobby
- Michael Bowen as Fletch
- Symba Smith as Annihilator Girl #1
- Julie Strain as Annihilator Girl #2
- Heather Elizabeth Parkhurst as Annihilator Girl #3
- John Singleton as Fireman
- George Lucas as Disappointed Man
- Arthur Hiller as Bar Patron #1
- Ray Harryhausen as Bar Patron #2
- Robert B. Sherman as Bar Patron #3
- Richard M. Sherman as Wonderworld Bandleader (deleted scenes)

== Production ==
=== Development and writing ===
Asked in 1989 about a third Beverly Hills Cop installment, Eddie Murphy stated: "There's no reason to do it. I don't need the money and it's not gonna break any new ground. How often can you have Axel Foley talk fast and get into a place he doesn't belong? But these motherfuckers are developing scripts for it. They're in pre-production. The only reason to do a Cop III is to beat the bank, and Paramount ain't gonna write me no check as big as I want to do something like that. In fact, if I do a Cop III, you can safely say, 'Ooh, he must have got a lot of money!'"

During the script's early drafts, the plot concerned Foley, Billy Rosewood (Judge Reinhold) and John Taggart (John Ashton) going to London to rescue Captain Andrew Bogomil (Ronny Cox), who was being held hostage by terrorists during an International Police Convention. However, problems such as scripting issues and budgeting caused pre-production to slow to the point where both Ashton and Cox had to drop out due to obligations to other film projects. Taggart's role was re-written as John Flint (Héctor Elizondo) and dialogue was inserted to explain that Taggart had retired and moved to Phoenix. Bogomil's absence is never addressed in this film, nor is he mentioned. However, Ashton and Cox make subtle cameo appearances in the form of a picture on Rosewood's desk of Foley, Taggart, Rosewood and Bogomil on a fishing trip. This is the same picture that appeared in Beverly Hills Cop II on Bogomil's and Foley's desks. In an interview in 2012, Ronny Cox said, "They wanted me to be in Beverly Hills Cop III, but...I read the script".

Rejected ideas for Cop III included a Robert Towne screenplay (in which Foley has to deal with his celebrity status), a scenario teaming Murphy with Sean Connery as a Scotland Yard detective and another Axel-in-London idea where his Scotland Yard counterpart would have been played by John Cleese. The last would have involved British gangsters, loosely based on the real-life Kray brothers, who were captured in Detroit and transported to London by Jeffrey Friedman (Axel's friend from Beverly Hills Cop and Beverly Hills Cop II, played by Paul Reiser) and Axel would have gone overseas after the gangsters' henchmen broke them out of custody and murdered Jeffrey. Murphy rejected this idea. Then-Paramount Chairman Brandon Tartikoff also pitched an idea of Axel teaming up with Crocodile Dundee, Murphy also rejected it.

When writer Steven E. de Souza was brought in, he originally wrote the story as more "Die Hard in a theme park". He was told that each of the rides he had designed would cost about $10 million to build and the whole film would cost about $70 million. When box office results for Murphy's 1992 comedy The Distinguished Gentleman came in, Paramount ordered the budget to be cut to $55 million. Paramount had earlier told Simpson and Bruckheimer that they would only outlay $25 million for a proposed version to be set in New York City, one of the main reasons that the producing team parted ways with the studio. Joel Silver was set to take over producing duties from Simpson and Bruckheimer; however, negotiations on a large budget resulted in production delays leading to Silver quitting production. It was at this time that producers Mace Neufeld and Robert Rehme took on the project. Consequently, the film became more about the investigation and less about the action.

Production was temporarily shut down to allow the Paramount top brass the chance to get to grips with the film's spiraling budget. Originally estimated at $55 million, it was soon in excess of $70 million. Of that budget, $15 million was Murphy's paycheck.

=== Filming ===
Principal photography began on September 8, 1993. The final chase scene through the "Land of the Dinosaurs", featuring eleven animatronic dinosaurs, was filmed at Universal Studios Stage 37. Exterior scenes set in the theme park were filmed at Paramount's Great America (now known as California's Great America) in Santa Clara, California, after Knott's Berry Farm declined permission. The three-armed Ferris wheel rescue scene used Great America's Sky Whirl. One shootout sequence was filmed inside the Earthquake in Stage 50 attraction on the Studio Tour from the Universal Studios Hollywood theme park in Universal City, California. The Sherman Brothers wrote the WonderWorld theme song. Filming wrapped on January 25, 1994.

== Music ==
=== Soundtrack ===
A soundtrack containing mostly R&B music was released on May 10, 1994, by MCA Records. It peaked at 158 on the Billboard 200 and 66 on the Top R&B/Hip-Hop Albums chart. While Harold Faltermeyer did not return to score this film, his co-producer from the previous franchise entries, Keith Forsey, did produce and co-write a new song entitled "Keep the Peace", performed by INXS. However, Nile Rodgers covered Faltermeyer's "Axel F" in a breakbeat hardcore version.

This is the only film in the series not to feature a song performed by The Pointer Sisters, although "Neutron Dance" was used in the film's trailer. Beverly Hills Cop featured their song "Neutron Dance", while Beverly Hills Cop II had their song "Be There".

== Reception ==
=== Critical response ===
On the review aggregator website Rotten Tomatoes, 11% of 57 critics' reviews are positive. The website's consensus reads: "Despite being set at an amusement park, Beverly Hills Cop III forgets to have any fun as it churns out uninspired violence and witless gags, with an uncharacteristically lethargic Eddie Murphy not helping matters." Metacritic, which uses a weighted average, assigned the film a score of 16 out of 100, based on 15 critics, indicating "overwhelming dislike". Audiences polled by CinemaScore gave the film an average grade of "B" on an A+ to F scale.

Richard Natale of Variety called it "a return to form by Eddie Murphy" that "runs out of steam before the end". Caryn James of The New York Times wrote that the film is designed to be a foolproof and safe money-maker, but Murphy plays Foley too straight. Owen Gleiberman of Entertainment Weekly rated it D− and called Murphy's performance "joyless" and "depressing".

Beverly Hills Cop III was nominated for two Golden Raspberry Awards, for Landis as Worst Director and the film as Worst Remake or Sequel at the 15th Golden Raspberry Awards.

=== Year-end lists ===
- 4th worst – Robert Denerstein, Rocky Mountain News
- Top 10 worst (not ranked) – Dan Webster, The Spokesman-Review
- Top 12 worst (Alphabetically ordered, not ranked) – David Elliott, The San Diego Union-Tribune
- Worst (not ranked) – Bob Ross, The Tampa Tribune
- Dishonorable mention – Glenn Lovell, San Jose Mercury News
- Dishonorable mention – Dan Craft, The Pantagraph

=== Crew comments ===
About the experience on making the movie, John Landis said:

"Cop 3 was a very strange experience. The script wasn't any good, but I figured, “So what? I'll make it funny with Eddie". But then I discovered on the first day when I started giving Eddie some shtick, he said, "You know, John… Axel Foley is an adult now. He's not a wiseass anymore". So, with Beverly Hills Cop 3, I had this strange experience where he was very professional, but he just wasn't funny. I would try to put him in funny situations, and he would find a way to step around them. It's an odd movie. There are things in it I like, but it's an odd movie."

Landis later said that he learned Murphy was jealous of the success that actors such as Wesley Snipes, Denzel Washington and Samuel L. Jackson were having in action films at the time. He suggested that this may have influenced Murphy's desire to play Axel more seriously. Despite his frustrations with Murphy's performance in the film, Landis described him as "really quite gifted with extraordinary talents", adding that, in his view, those talents were by then most apparent when Murphy performed in disguise.

In an interview in 1994, Eddie Murphy said that Beverly Hills Cop III is "different from the trilogy's first installment because Axel is more mature and no longer the wisecracking rookie cop." During that same year, Murphy said he thought Beverly Hills Cop III was "infinitely better than Beverly Hills Cop II."

In an interview with The A.V. Club in 2009, Bronson Pinchot claimed that Eddie Murphy "was really depressed" at the time Beverly Hills Cop III was being filmed, claiming that Murphy was low-spirited and had a low energy level.

Speaking on Late Night with Seth Meyers, Eddie Murphy noted that the first and second Beverly Hills Cop "are really good" while the third one lacked "a great villain." Sitting down with Screen Rant ahead of Beverly Hills Cop: Axel F, Murphy reflected on Beverly Hills Cop III, and why it did not work. He commented that the third entry in the franchise failed to connect with audiences due to the omission of Sergeant John Taggart (portrayed by John Ashton), and also because the stakes in the movie weren't high enough compared to its two predecessors: “The reason Beverly Hills Cop 3 was soft was because Taggart's not in the movie, and the villain isn't villainous enough, and Axel didn't have any skin in the game. The first movie, Axel's best friend is killed. And the second one, his friend, Captain Bogomil (Ronny Cox), gets shot. And then in the third one, his boss, chief Todd is killed but the focus is on Uncle Dave being in trouble. That's what the movie's about.”

== Sequel ==
A fourth entry in the series was initially announced for release in the mid-1990s, under the production of Eddie Murphy's own production company Eddie Murphy Productions, though production later fizzled out. It was re-announced in 2006, when producer Jerry Bruckheimer announced his intention to resurrect the film series, though he eventually gave up his option to produce the film, instead passing production duties to Lorenzo di Bonaventura. In September 2006 a script, an amalgamation of several earlier drafts, was presented to Murphy who was reported to be "very happy" with the outline which was described as an attempt to recapture the "feel of the original". Murphy admitted one of his motivations for making a fourth Beverly Hills Cop film was to make up for the fact that the third film was "horrible" and that "he didn't want to leave (the series) like that".

In May 2008, Rush Hour director Brett Ratner was officially named director, who promised the film would return under the series' standard R rating, rather than as a rumored watered down PG-13. Michael Brandt and Derek Haas were hired as screenwriters to improve on the existing script in July 2008 and completed a new script, under the working title Beverly Hills Cop 2009, which would see Foley return to Beverly Hills to investigate the murder of his friend Billy Rosewood. The script was eventually rejected, leaving Ratner to work on a new idea. In an interview with Empire magazine, Ratner stated "I'm working very hard on the fourth. It's very difficult, especially since there were three before. We're trying to figure out some important things, like where do we start? Is Axel retired? Is he in Beverly Hills? Is he on vacation? Does Judge Reinhold return as the loveable Billy Rosewood? Many questions to figure out, but I'm hoping to have a script before film disappears from our existence." Although Murphy himself committed to the project, it was unconfirmed whether the series' other principal actors, Judge Reinhold, John Ashton, Ronny Cox or Bronson Pinchot would also return, though Ratner stated in late 2009 that he was trying to convince Reinhold and Ashton to reprise their roles. Harold Faltermeyer's "Axel F", however, would definitely be returning for the proposed fourth installment, with Ratner quoted as saying "It'll be back but it'll be a whole new interpretation." On November 15, 2010, Ratner stated in an interview with MTV News that there was still a possibility that they will make a fourth film, but that it wouldn't be "anytime soon."

In October 2011, Murphy discussed a possible fourth film, stating, "They're not doing it. What I'm trying to do now is produce a TV show starring Axel Foley's son, and Axel is the chief of police now in Detroit. I'd do the pilot, show up here and there. None of the movie scripts were right; it was trying to force the premise. If you have to force something, you shouldn't be doing it. It was always a rehash of the old thing. It was always wrong."

During late Summer 2013, after CBS decided to pass on the TV series, Paramount decided to move forward with the fourth film. On September 13, 2013, Jerry Bruckheimer stated he was in talks to produce. On December 6, 2013, it was announced that Eddie Murphy would again reprise the role of Axel Foley and Brett Ratner would direct. On May 2, 2014, Deadline announced that screenwriters Josh Appelbaum and Andre Nemec would be penning the screenplay.

On June 27, 2014, in an interview with Rolling Stone, Murphy discussed returning to the edgier type character of Axel Foley after years of making family-friendly films. "I haven't done a street guy, working class, blue-collar character in ages so maybe it's like, 'Oh, wow, I didn't remember he was able to do that'", Murphy said. According to studio reports on the film's plot, Foley returns to Detroit after leaving his job in Beverly Hills and he's faced with the coldest winter on record to navigate the new rules and old enemies of one of America's most tenacious cities. The state of Michigan approved $13.5 million in film incentives, based on an estimated $56.6 million of filmmaker spending in the state. The film was supposed to be shot in and around Detroit and was estimated to provide jobs for 352 workers. The film was originally scheduled for a March 25, 2016 release, but on May 6, 2015, Paramount Pictures pulled Beverly Hills Cop IV from its release schedule, due to script concerns.

On October 1, 2019, in an interview with Collider, Murphy confirmed that production on Beverly Hills Cop IV will commence once the filming of Coming 2 America has wrapped. On November 14, 2019, Deadline Hollywood announced that Paramount Pictures made a one-time license deal with an option for a sequel to Netflix to create the fourth film. By May 2020, after delays in the filmmaking business caused by the COVID-19 pandemic, Adil El Arbi and Bilall Fallah confirmed they are still attached as co-directors and that a new screenwriter was working on a new script for the film. In April 2022, Arbi and Fallah left the film to focus on Batgirl (2022), with Mark Molloy hired to replace them. In the same article, Will Beall was announced to have penned the script. The film was retitled Beverly Hills Cop: Axel F, with filming commencing on August 29, 2022 and releasing on July 3, 2024.
