= Tonight (Black Eyed Peas and El Alfa song) =

Single by Black Eyed Peas and El Alfa featuring Becky G

from the album Bad Boys: Ride or Die
- Released: May 10, 2024
- Studio: Just for the Record Studios (Sun Valley, CA)
- Length: 3:38
- Label: Epic
- Songwriters: William Adams; Yonatan Goldstein; Emanuel Herrera Batista; Rebbeca Marie Gomez; Phil Collins; Tony Banks; Mike Rutherford
- Producers: will.i.am; Johnny Goldstein

Black Eyed Peas singles chronology
"Guarantee" (2023)	"Tonight" (2024)	"East LA" (2025)

El Alfa singles chronology
"La Gringa" (2023)	"Tonight" (2024)	"Bukele" (2024)

Becky G singles chronology
"Mercedes" (2024)	"Tonight" (2024)	"Como Diablos" (2024)

Music video
- "Tonight" on YouTube

"Tonight" (also known as "Tonight (Bad Boys: Ride or Die)" is a song by American group Black Eyed Peas and Dominican rapper El Alfa featuring American singer Becky G, released by Epic Records on May 10, 2024, as the first single from the Bad Boys: Ride or Die soundtrack of the 2024 film.

== Background and composition ==
The song features a prominent, slowed down sample of the 1986 song "Tonight, Tonight, Tonight" by the British rock band Genesis.

== Accolades ==
Awards and nominations for "Tonight"
Organization	Year	Category	Result	Ref.
Lo Nuestro Awards	2025	Crossover Collaboration of the Year	Nominated	

== Charts ==
Chart performance for "Tonight"
Chart (2024)	Peak position
US Hot Dance/Electronic Songs (Billboard)	32
US Latin Airplay (Billboard)	46
US Pop Airplay (Billboard)	31
