= Judge Reinhold =

American actor (born 1957)

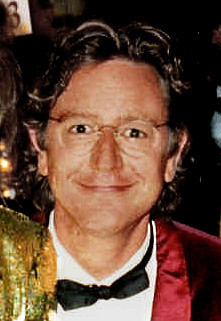
- Reinhold in 1994
- Born: Edward Ernest Reinhold Jr. May 21, 1957 (age 69); Wilmington, Delaware, U.S.
- Occupation: Actor
- Years active: 1979–present
- Works: Full list
- Spouses: Carrie Frazier (m. 1985; div. 1986) Amy Miller (m. 2000)
- Children: 1

Edward Ernest "Judge" Reinhold Jr. (born May 21, 1957) is an American actor. He has starred in films including Stripes (1981), Fast Times at Ridgemont High (1982), and Ruthless People (1986). He has co-starred in all of the films in the Beverly Hills Cop series (1984, 1987, 1994, and 2024) and The Santa Clause (1994, 2002 and 2006) franchises.

== Early life ==
Reinhold was born in Wilmington, Delaware, the son of Regina Celeste (née Fleming; 1923–2023) and Edward Ernest Reinhold (1907–1977), a trial lawyer. He was raised in Fredericksburg, Virginia, and attended James Monroe High School until his family moved to Martin County, Florida, prior to his junior year in high school. He attended Mary Washington College and Palm Beach State College (known as "Palm Beach Junior College" at the time). His maternal grandfather was from County Meath, Ireland.

== Career ==
=== Early roles ===
Reinhold had a lead role in the movie Running Scared (1980) and a supporting part in the comedy Stripes (1981). He was one of many names in the flop comedy Pandemonium (1982).

Reinhold's first major film role was as high school senior Brad Hamilton in Fast Times at Ridgemont High (1982), along with then-unknown actors Sean Penn, Phoebe Cates, Forest Whitaker, Jennifer Jason Leigh, Nicolas Cage, Anthony Edwards and Eric Stoltz. "I thought my career would really take off after that role," Reinhold said later. "Instead, Sean's career took off."

Reinhold had small roles in The Lords of Discipline (1983) and Gremlins (1984), and he appeared in an uncredited role in Pat Benatar's music video for "Shadows of the Night".

=== Beverly Hills Cop and stardom ===
Reinhold's career began to gain momentum when he played Detective Billy Rosewood, the junior police detective sent to trail Eddie Murphy's character, in Beverly Hills Cop (1984).

The film's success led to Reinhold being given starring roles in Roadhouse 66 (1985), Head Office (1985) and Off Beat (1986), but none of those were particularly successful. However, Ruthless People (1986), where he had a supporting role, was a big hit. That year, he said in an interview, "In my movies I portray this 'Everyman' persona, someone everybody can empathize with. People can identify with a guy like me."

Reinhold tried to get financing for a film based on Carl Hiaasen's best-selling novel Tourist Season, but it was never made. Instead, he appeared in Beverly Hills Cop II (1987), which was another large success.

Reinhold was given the lead in Vice Versa (1988), but it flopped. "That was really the end of my highfalutin Hollywood career," Reinhold said later. "That's when the phone stopped ringing." He also developed a reputation for being difficult on set. "I was spoiled, and I was arrogant," said Reinhold of this period later. "I was very demanding, had an overblown image of who I was and got a reputation for being difficult. And rightfully so."

=== Return to supporting roles ===
He had supporting roles in Rosalie Goes Shopping (1989) and Daddy's Dyin': Who's Got the Will? (1990), and the lead in Enid Is Sleeping (1991) and Zandalee (1991), which he also produced.

Reinhold starred in the Canadian hard rock band Harem Scarem's 1992 music video "Honestly" as the male love interest. In 1994, Reinhold appeared in Beverly Hills Cop III and The Santa Clause. He reprised the latter role of Dr. Neal Miller in The Santa Clause 2 (2002) and The Santa Clause 3: The Escape Clause (2006).

=== Later career ===
Reinhold was nominated for an Emmy for a role on Seinfeld in which he played the "close talker" who develops an obsession with Jerry's parents. He can also be seen in Steven Spielberg's epic miniseries Into the West and replaced Charles Grodin in two direct-to-video movies in the Beethoven film series.

Reinhold appeared in the 2008 political satire Swing Vote.

In September 2022, Reinhold reprised his role as Detective Billy Rosewood in Beverly Hills Cop: Axel F.

== Personal life ==
Reinhold was nicknamed "Judge" because, when he was a baby, he looked stern and judge-like.

He and his second wife, Amy Reinhold, have a daughter named Haley Rose who was born in February 2013. They live together in Little Rock, Arkansas.

Reinhold was arrested at Dallas Love Field airport on December 8, 2016, for disorderly conduct after objecting to a patdown from security shortly after he was released from the hospital following an adverse reaction to a medication. He spent ten hours in jail and accepted a deferred adjudication agreement under which charges would be dismissed in 90 days.

== In popular culture ==
Reinhold has occasionally been referred to in film and television, largely in reference to his nickname, Judge. In the film Fanboys, Billy Dee Williams appears as a courtroom judge named "Judge Reinhold".

== Awards and nominations ==
Year	Award	Category	Work	Result
1994	Primetime Emmy Award	Outstanding Guest Actor in a Comedy Series	Seinfeld	Nominated
