= 2001 Detroit mayoral election =

- November 6, 2001
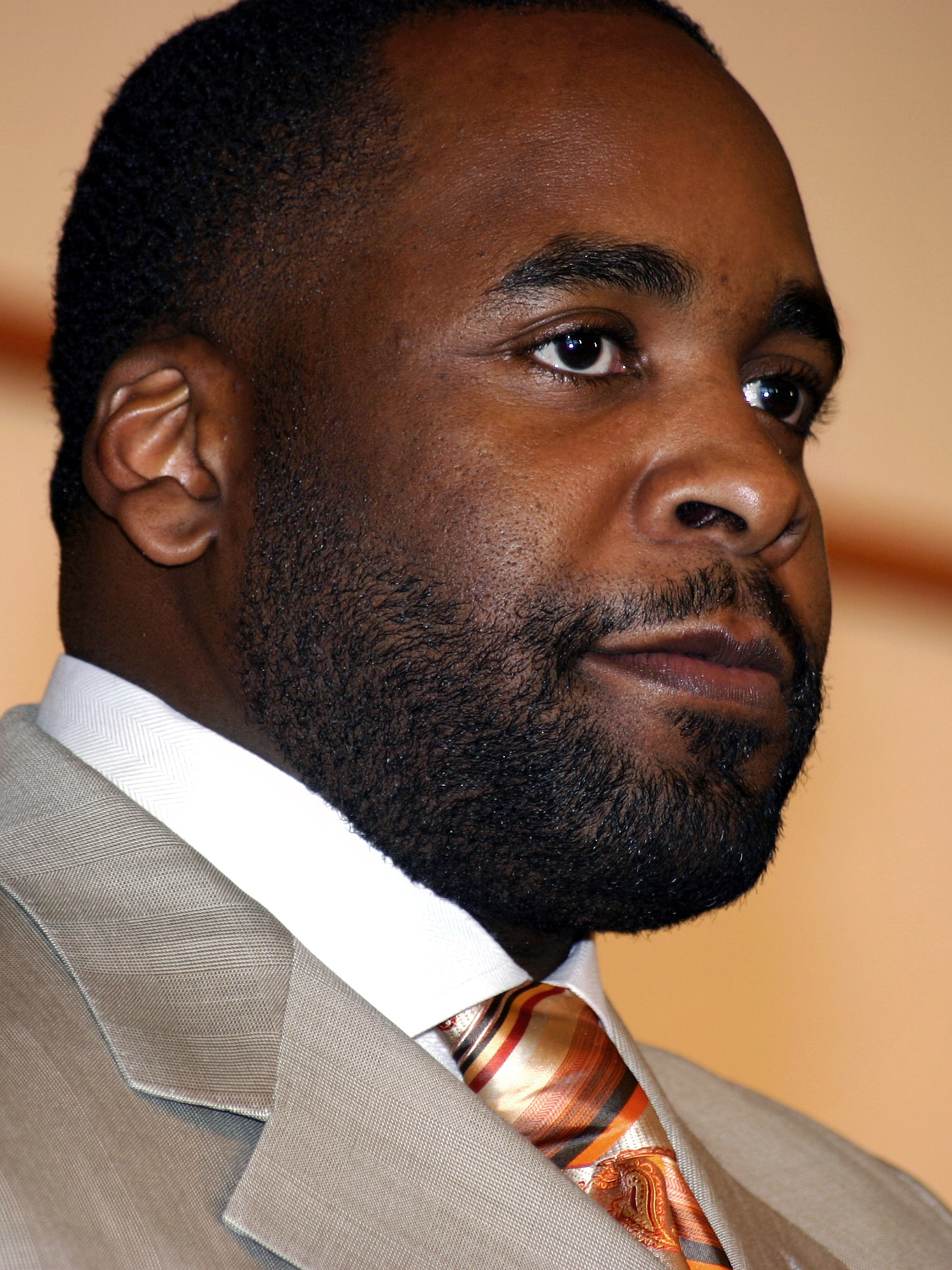
Candidate	Kwame Kilpatrick	Gil Hill
Party	Nonpartisan	Nonpartisan
Percentage	54%	46%
Mayor before election
Dennis Archer
Elected mayor
Kwame Kilpatrick

The 2001 Detroit mayoral election took place on November 6, 2001. It saw the election of Kwame Kilpatrick.

At the age of 31, Kilpatrick became the youngest mayor ever elected in the city's history.

== Background ==
On April 7, 2001, incumbent mayor Dennis Archer made the surprise announcement that he would not be running for a third term.

== Candidates ==
=== Ran ===
Twenty-one candidates ran.

==== Advanced to general election ====
- Gil Hill, Detroit City Council president, former chief of the Detroit Police Department, actor
- Kwame Kilpatrick, minority leader of the Michigan House of Representatives

==== Eliminated in primary ====
- Charles Beckham, former director of the Detroit Water and Sewerage Department and former member of the Detroit Board of Water Commissioners
- Thomas E. Binion
- Raymond Edward Boatwright
- Clifford Brookins II
- William C. Brooks, former United States assistant secretary of labor for the Employment Standards Administration, former member of the Social Security Advisory Board, former chairman of the Detroit Public Schools Board of Education, former General Motors executive
- Angelo S. Brown
- Delonda A. Browner
- Charles C. Costa
- James Del Rio, former judge of the Recorder's Court
- Freddie L. Fulson
- John E. George Jr.
- Joe Harris, auditor general of Detroit since 1995
- Osborne G. Hart
- Nicholas Hood III, former member of the Detroit City Council (1993–2001)
- Raymond Lyle Jr.
- Eileen Martin
- James Thomas III
- Roosevelt Williams
- Leonard Young

=== Declined to run ===
- Geoffrey Feiger, attorney and Democratic nominee for governor of Michigan in 1998
- Freman Hendrix, deputy mayor of Detroit
- Sharon McPhail, candidate in the 1993 Detroit mayoral election
- Benny Napoleon, chief of the Detroit Police Department

== Primary ==
=== Campaigning ===
The nonpartisan primary election was held on September 11, 2001.

Hill had initially supported Kilpatrick for mayor, before reversing and launching his own campaign.

The primary election campaign was regarded to have been largely polite in character. Hill and Kilpatrick, in particular, were noted to be respectful in their regard of each other during the primary, unusually so for a Detroit mayoral election.

Hill was endorsed by the American Federation of State, County and Municipal Employees and United Auto Workers.

Outgoing mayor Dennis Archer did not endorse any candidate. Also declining to endorse a candidate was governor John Engler.

Kilpatrick made a number of gaffes that were seen as hampering his momentum among parts of the electorate. One gaffe was remarking, while on a religious cable television program, that he did not want his sons exposed to a "homosexual lifestyle". Kilpatrick also faced controversy beyond remarks on the campaign trail, including reporting by the Detroit Free Press that he had solicited a $50,000 contribution to his Kilpatrick Civic Fund from the president of a tax-funded homeless shelter, as well as the management arm of the homeless shelter. The donation was used for voter education in advance of the November 2000 elections.

Hill was better-known than Kilpatrick.

For much of the campaign, Hill had a very large lead in polls. He had built a strong lead in polls as early as May, which lasted well into the campaign. As a result, he was regarded as the clear front-runner until the last weeks of the primary campaign. Contrarily, Killpatrick was, earlier in the campaign, seen as a long-shot, registering as low as 16% support in polls at one point. However, approximately a week prior to the election, a poll was released showing Kilpatrick with a 10% lead over Hill. By the end of the primary campaign, Hill and Kilpatrick were well-established in recent polls as the front-runners to advance to the general election.

In the lead up to the election, it was seen as the most energized primary since the 1973 mayoral election. The primary, however, was overshadowed by the September 11th terrorist attacks on the United States, which took place the same day. Turnout for the primary wound up being one of the lowest in the city's history, with just 22% of eligible voters participating.

=== Polls ===
Poll source	Date(s) administered	Sample (Note: Key: A – all adults RV – registered voters LV – likely voters V – unclear)	Margin of error	Charles Beckham	William C. Brooks	Gil Hill	Nicholas Hood III	Kwame Kilpatrick	Others	Undecided
EPIC/MRA	June 19, 2001	300	± 5.7%	4.6%	4.7%	37.4%	7.8%	22.5%	–	23.0%
EPIC/MRA	May 7–10, 2001	300	± 5.7%	3.7%	2.3%	49.7%	11.3%	16.0%	17.0%	
EPIC/MRA	April 17–18, 2001	344 LV	± 5.3%	3%	2%	13%	9%	10%	43% (Note: Geoffrey Fieger at 13%; Benny Napoleon at 12%; Sharon McPhail at 10%; Freman Hendrix at 8%)	

=== Results ===
Gil Hill and Kwame Kilpatrick were the top-two finishers, and therefore advanced to the general election.

Kilpatrick received 51% of the vote, while Hill received 34% of the vote. Turnout was 22%.

Exit polling indicated that Kilpatrick ultimately led in support among most demographic groups. Hill, however, did lead with older voters.

Kilpatrick's very strong performance was a surprise, and Hill was regarded to have underperformed expectations.

== General election ==
=== Campaigning ===
While, due to his strong performance in the primary, Kilpatrick was initially seen as a very strong front-runner for the general election, later polls began to show a close race in the general election.

As in the primary, outgoing mayor Dennis Archer did not endorse either candidate.

=== Polls ===
Poll source	Date(s) administered	Sample size	Margin of error	Gil Hill	Kwame Kilpatrick	Other	Undecided
SurveyUSA	October 31–November 2, 2001	500 LV	±4.5%	47%	48%	5%	
SurveyUSA	October 27–28, 2001	500 LV	±4.5%	42%	51%	7%	
SurveyUSA	October 20–21, 2001	500 LV	±4.5%	42%	51%	7%	
EPIC/MRA	September 11, 2001	400		39%	51%	–	10%

=== Results ===
Kilpatrick defeated Hill 54% to 46%.
