= Bad Boys: Ride or Die (soundtrack) =

2024 soundtrack albums

Bad Boys: Ride or Die (The Soundtrack)

Soundtrack album by various artists
- Released: June 7, 2024
- Length: 24:46
- Label: Epic

Singles from Bad Boys: Ride or Die (The Soundtrack)
- 1. "Tonight" Released: May 30, 2024; 2. "Lights Out" Released: June 7, 2024; 3. "Light Em Up" Released: July 15, 2024

Bad Boys: Ride or Die is the soundtrack to the 2024 film Bad Boys: Ride or Die directed by Adil El Arbi and Bilall Fallah; the fourth instalment in the Bad Boys series and the sequel to Bad Boys for Life starring Will Smith and Martin Lawrence. It was released through Epic Records on June 7, 2024, featuring contributions from Black Eyed Peas, Will Smith, Sean Paul, Shenseea, Becky G amongst several others. The album was preceded by the lead single "Tonight" which was released on May 30, 2024.

== Track listing ==
| No. | Title | Artist(s) | Length |
|---|---|---|---|
| 1. | "Tonight" | Black Eyed Peas and El Alfa featuring Becky G | 3:38 |
| 2. | "Lights Out" | Bia and JID | 3:18 |
| 3. | "Mike T" | ScarLip | 2:47 |
| 4. | "Oh No" | Bia | 1:37 |
| 5. | "Duh" | Flo Milli | 2:12 |
| 6. | "Bam Bam" | Shenseea and Myke Towers | 2:55 |
| 7. | "Brand New" | 21 Lil Harold | 2:33 |
| 8. | "Flores Pa Ti" | Becky G, Luísa Sonza and Papatinho | 1:40 |
| 9. | "Light Em Up" | Will Smith and Sean Paul | 2:02 |
| 10. | "Bad Boys" | Sean Paul and Trueno | 2:04 |
| Total length: | | | 24:46 |

== Chart performance ==
Weekly chart performance for Bad Boys: Ride or Die (The Soundtrack)
| Chart (2024) | Peak position |
|---|---|
| US Billboard 200 | 134 |
| US Soundtrack Albums (Billboard) | 12 |

== Original score ==
Bad Boys: Ride or Die (Original Motion Picture Score)

Film score by Lorne Balfe
- Released: June 7, 2024
- Length: 24:46
- Label: Sony Classical
- Producer: Lorne Balfe

Lorne Balfe chronology
| Argylle (2024) | Bad Boys: Ride or Die (2024) | Beverly Hills Cop: Axel F (2024) |

Lorne Balfe composed the score for Ride or Die after doing the same for its predecessor. Sony Classical Records released the film's score album on June 7, 2024.

=== Reception ===
Filmtracks.com wrote "the score for Bad Boys: Ride or Die loses both the charm of its original inspiration and the dramatic appeal of Balfe's stance for the preceding film."

=== Track listing ===
| No. | Title | Length |
|---|---|---|
| 1. | "Bad Boys: Ride or Die" | 2:29 |
| 2. | "Sugar Rush Shootout" | 1:36 |
| 3. | "Basement of the Ocean" | 2:36 |
| 4. | "Fear is a Tool" | 2:46 |
| 5. | "Bridge Barrage" | 2:46 |
| 6. | "Prison Yard Attack" | 3:12 |
| 7. | "Hacking Howard" | 3:36 |
| 8. | "Framing the Boys" | 2:53 |
| 9. | "Flammable Fluid" | 3:38 |
| 10. | "Finding McGrath" | 2:24 |
| 11. | "Reggie in Action" | 3:38 |
| 12. | "Columbian Manicure" | 5:01 |
| 13. | "Taking Heavies" | 3:29 |
| 14. | "No More Prayers" | 2:03 |
| 15. | "Standoff" | 5:33 |
| Total length: | | 47:40 |
