= Talent holding deal =

Entertainment contract

Talent holding deal (sometimes spelled Talent-holding deal) is a contract between an entertainer or artist and a representing agency, valid while the agency is developing a movie, television program, live performance act, album or other entertainment venue for an artist. In this context, the "agency" may actually be a television network, music or movie production company, or an individual agent. It is a type of retainer agreement in that the artist is compensated for work yet to be determined. The deals usually require exclusivity for a fixed period of time, in which the entertainer agrees to not sign or work with any other agencies during the period of the contract.

== Uses and examples ==
There are a variety of reasons for an entertainer and an agency to enter this type of contract. Some examples include:

- Vanessa Williams signed a talent holding deal with ABC after coming off two successful consecutive television programs on the same network, Ugly Betty and Desperate Housewives. The deal allowed ABC to keep an exclusive working relationship with Williams while they created a new show for her, while she was in between starring roles in their productions.
- Diane Keaton had maintained a talent holding deal with HBO after a failed pilot for Tilda, for work in future undetermined programs. allowing the network to maintain a relationship after failing previously to get her program broadcast.
- A talent holding deal may also be used as a prize for a contest, such as when NBC held its Stand Up For Diversity Talent Search, awarding the contract well in advance of developing a broadcast show or medium for the winner of the contest.
- Another use is when a network wants to recruit talent from a different network but doesn't have a specific show or program to offer the entertainer. An example is Corey Reynolds, who had spent the past seven seasons portraying Sgt. David Gabriel in the drama The Closer, a program on TNT. He was offered the chance to continue the role in spin-off series Major Crimes with costar Mary McDonnell by TNT, but NBC was able to convince him by the offer of a talent holding deal.
- In her quasi-reality dramedy, Fat Actress, Kirstie Alley signed a Talent holding deal with NBC while she tries to lose weight.
