= Running Scared (1980 film) =

1980 film by Paul Glickler

- Directed by: Paul Glickler
- Written by: David Odell
- Based on: A story by Paul Glickler
- Produced by: Paul Glickler
- Starring: Ken Wahl; Judge Reinhold; Annie McEnroe; John Saxon; Bradford Dillman; Pat Hingle; Lonny Chapman
- Cinematography: Willy Kurant; Nathaniel Dorsky
- Edited by: Robert Q. Lovett
- Music by: Roger Kellaway
- Distributed by: Thorn EMI(UK); Goodtimes Entertainment
- Release date: November 17, 1980
- Running time: 96 minutes
- Country: United States
- Language: English

Running Scared is a 1980 American action-adventure film directed by Paul Glickler, starring Ken Wahl and introducing Annie McEnroe and Judge Reinhold.

== Plot ==
The film takes place in April 1961, prior to the proposed Bay of Pigs Invasion. Two soldiers, LeRoy Beecher (Judge Reinhold) and Chaz McClain (Ken Wahl), are just finishing a two-year Infantry tour in the Army in Panama. They hitch a ride on a military C-47 back to their home state, Florida, after bribing the pilot with a gift of LP records. LeRoy has stolen a footlocker full of surveillance equipment, particularly an infra-red camera (punishable with time in Leavenworth). During the flight to Florida, the plane makes a brief stopover on some secret Caribbean island base. While at the island, LeRoy, goofing around, unwittingly uses the infra-red camera to take photographs of the base and of Chaz (thereby identifying him). He leaves the tear-off part of the negative on the C-47's floor. The plane then continues to Florida, where Leroy and Chaz disembark and workers (presumably anti-Castrist Cubans) sweep up the aircraft and find LeRoy's camera tear-off. The workers take the negative to two superiors, Captain Munoz (John Saxon) and Arthur Jaeger (Bradford Dillman), who are planning an invasion of Cuba from the secret island base. They develop LeRoy's negatives and now can visually identify Chaz.

The anti-Castrists know the plane was heading to Florida and now think that LeRoy and Chaz are spies sent to give away the secret of the island base and presumed invasion. Munoz and Jaeger assemble a large number of armed men and proceed to search for and locate LeRoy and Chaz throughout the Florida Everglades. When Chaz and LeRoy return home, they try to re-adjust to civilian life. They thumb a ride with a teenage boy who is on his way to school and drives a souped-up hot rod car. The boy, who has fantasies of joining the army himself, gives Chaz and LeRoy a crazy high-speed ride through the back country, dropping them off in town.

Afterward, they go to a diner, where the latest music, Del Shannon's "Runaway" and Ronnie Dawson's "Decided By The Angels", is playing on a jukebox and they encounter two young high school girls with a station wagon. One of the teenage girls shows LeRoy a new dance called The Twist. After fighting off Munoz in the bathroom, the boys go to a secluded spot with the girls and "score" with the girls before they go off to school. However, the boys have not been off the plane for long before Munoz' armed men, having identified them in the diner, capture them. They escape, only to get caught on an artillery range. LeRoy makes it out of the barrage and gets back to his parents' home. Chaz loses contact with him, but survives the night.

The next morning, Chaz is searching for LeRoy when he comes across a fancy convertible being worked on by an attractive, rich young woman named Sallie Mae (Annie McEnroe) and offers to help in exchange for a lift. After escaping a death squad, during the course which Sallie Mae's car gets shot and banged up, she refuses to take Chaz to LeRoy's parents' house, and he threatens to cut up her car seats with a razor blade if she abandons him on the road. Sallie Mae consents to take Chaz to LeRoy's parents' house deep in the Everglades swamp, where her car breaks down across from the driveway. LeRoy, Chaz and Sallie Mae are reunited. It is revealed that LeRoy's father, "Pa" Beecher (Lonny Chapman), runs an illegal moonshine operation. The Beechers, Pa and Ma, have been out shopping and return to encounter Chaz and Sallie Mae, who helps Ma Beecher with the groceries. Pa Beecher's temper hits the roof when he sees Sallie Mae's broken-down convertible across the road, as it easily gives away the location of his home and that he's running an illegal liquor operation. The soldiers track Chaz and LeRoy to the latter's parents' home after spotting Sallie Mae's car.

A shootout occurs at the Beecher home. Pa Beecher is angry that his moonshine secret is out, and curses his son. LeRoy, along with Chaz and Sallie Mae, steal one of Mister Beecher's airboats and an exciting long chase continues through the swamp. Chaz later returns to his own father's (Pat Hingle) house and encounters his old girlfriend, Robin. Robin, seeing Sallie Mae, thinks that Chaz has impregnated her and leaves him. Sallie Mae also returns with Chaz to her parents' (who are vacationing in Europe) palatial estate and the two clean themselves up. After much adventure eluding Munoz, Jaeger and their men, LeRoy and Chaz eventually overcome them. A romance has developed between Chaz and the wealthy Sallie Mae.

== Notes ==
This film is known under several titles for home media, cable TV and foreign market, including Desperate Men, Back in the USA, Auf Teufel Komm Raus (German), Panische Flucht (German). Once readily available on cable and videotape, it can be streamed for a fee on Youtube and Amazon.

Lonny Chapman who plays Pa Beecher was a cast member of a 1961-62 tv show The Everglades which starred Ron Hayes and featured the use of airboats.

== Home media ==
The film was released on DVD (and later on Blu-Ray) on September 26, 2017 from CodeRed video. Paul Glickler provides an audio-commentary throughout.

== Cast ==
- Judge Reinhold as LeRoy Beecher
- Ken Wahl as Chaz McClain
- Annie McEnroe as Sally Mae Giddens
- Bradford Dillman as Arthur Jaeger
- John Saxon as Captain Munoz
- Pat Hingle as Sergeant McClain
- Lonny Chapman as Pa Beecher (credited as Lonnie Chapman)
- Tom McFadden as Colonel Williams
- Tim Brantly as Kid In Jalopy
- Mary Lawson as Ponytail
- Lisa Felcoski as Sandy
- Francine Joyce as Robin Winston
- Malcolm Jones as Storekeeper
- Tom Tully as Pilot of C-47
- Roger Pretto as Commando Lieutenant
