= Enid Is Sleeping =

- Directed by: Maurice Phillips
- Written by: A.J. Tipping; James Whaley; Maurice Phillips
- Produced by: John A. Davis; Howard Malin
- Starring: Elizabeth Perkins; Judge Reinhold; Jeffrey Jones; Maureen Mueller; Michael J. Pollard; Rhea Perlman
- Cinematography: Affonso Beato
- Edited by: Malcolm Campbell
- Music by: Craig Safan
- Production company: Davis Entertainment
- Distributed by: Vestron Pictures
- Release date: May 25, 1990 (Seattle International Film Festival)
- Running time: 105 minutes
- Country: United States
- Language: English

Enid Is Sleeping (released on television and home video as Over Her Dead Body) is a 1990 dark comedy film directed by Maurice Phillips, starring Judge Reinhold, Elizabeth Perkins and Jeffrey Jones.

== Plot ==
The film begins with a flashback to a household in Las Moscas, New Mexico, in the year 1959. The mother, Mrs. Pearly, is completely overwhelmed managing her household chores, her children Enid and June, and their visiting friend Harry. Angry and vicious, Enid puts her baby sister June into the oven while her mother is away for a moment to receive Harry's mother.

In 1984 (25 years later), Enid, now joined with Harry in an unloving marriage, returns home to unexpectedly find him having an affair with June. Reacting violently, she prepares to shoot them with Harry's police service gun. June smashes a vase on her head, apparently killing her. Panicking, they decide to make Enid's death look like a car accident while she and June were visiting their mother. However, complications arise when Harry's partner Floyd unwittingly gets in their way and an ashamed June begins holding a monologue with Enid to rid herself of her pangs of conscience, delaying her in disposing of the body.

While transporting Enid's body to a dangerous road curve in the desert for the staging, June discovers that an actual accident has occurred there. Moreover, a drunken trucker attempts to flirt with both her and Enid, forcing her to shake him off and thus putting Harry and Floyd on her case. After unsuccessfully trying to push the car off a cliff, she attempts to simply dump Enid in the middle of the desert, but gets herself stuck near an Indian burial ground. Leaving the body, she calls Harry from a gas station for help. En route, Harry abandons Floyd at a rest stop, but immediately afterwards Floyd gets involved in an attempted armed robbery and shoots one of the robbers, making his partner flee.

After retrieving the body with Harry's help, June stops at a road motel, but gets an unwanted visitation from the drunk trucker, causing the motel's manager to throw them out. Forced to a stop by a fallen tree, she pushes the car into the nearby Sanchez River, but a young couple sees her and calls the police. Harry abandons Floyd once again and helps June pull the car out of the river. While driving home, June falls asleep at the wheel and wrecks a billboard, causing a state trooper to pull her over. When the state trooper opens the trunk, he is knocked out by Enid, who is, though groggy, very much alive.

June deposits Enid at her home, but while driving away, she is kidnapped by the fugitive robber. Suffering a nervous breakdown, she begins to drive wildly, causing the robber to drop a lit cigarette into a puddle of leaking gasoline, which blows up the car, killing the robber. With the body burned beyond recognition, and with Enid's cigarette case found in the wreck, everyone in town, including Harry, assumes that Enid was the victim. Harry happily returns home, only to find a slightly scorched June and the still-living - and extremely furious - Enid waiting for him.

== Cast ==
- Elizabeth Perkins as June Pearly
- Judge Reinhold as Harry Hopper
- Jeffrey Jones as Floyd
- Maureen Mueller as Enid Pearly
- Rhea Perlman as Mavis
- Brion James as George the Trucker
- Charles Tyner as Man at Indian Burial Site
- Henry Jones as Old Man
- Michael J. Pollard as Motel Manager
- Nicolas Love as Robber #1
- Alex Chapman as Robber #2

== Reception ==
The film received negative reviews and was a box office failure.
