= Beverly Hills Cop II =

1987 buddy cop film directed by Tony Scott

- Theatrical release poster
- Directed by: Tony Scott
- Screenplay by: Larry Ferguson; Warren Skaaren
- Story by: Eddie Murphy; Robert D. Wachs
- Based on: Characters by Danilo Bach and Daniel Petrie Jr.
- Produced by: Don Simpson; Jerry Bruckheimer
- Starring: Eddie Murphy; Judge Reinhold; Jürgen Prochnow; Ronny Cox; John Ashton; Brigitte Nielsen; Allen Garfield; Paul Reiser
- Cinematography: Jeffrey L. Kimball
- Edited by: Chris Lebenzon; Michael Tronick; Billy Weber
- Music by: Harold Faltermeyer
- Production companies: Don Simpson/Jerry Bruckheimer Films; Eddie Murphy Productions
- Distributed by: Paramount Pictures
- Release dates: May 19, 1987 (Los Angeles); May 20, 1987 (United States)
- Running time: 103 minutes
- Country: United States
- Language: English
- Budget: $27 million
- Box office: $300 million

Beverly Hills Cop II is a 1987 American action comedy film directed by Tony Scott and written by Larry Ferguson and Warren Skaaren from a story by Eddie Murphy and Robert D. Wachs. A sequel to Beverly Hills Cop (1984) and the second installment in the Beverly Hills Cop film series, it stars Murphy, Judge Reinhold, Jürgen Prochnow, Ronny Cox, John Ashton, Brigitte Nielsen, Allen Garfield, and Paul Reiser. Set two years after the original film, it follows Detroit police detective Axel Foley (Murphy) as he reunites with Beverly Hills detectives Billy Rosewood (Reinhold) and John Taggart (Ashton) to investigate the shooting of Captain Andrew Bogomil (Cox) and stop the perpetrators behind a series of "Alphabet" robberies.

Following the success of Beverly Hills Cop, Paramount Pictures initially considered adapting the property as a television series before Murphy agreed to return for a feature-film sequel. Scott was hired as director following the success of Top Gun (1986), and principal photography took place between November 1986 and March 1987. During post-production, additional comedy scenes were filmed after early cuts emphasized action over humor.

Released on May 20, 1987, Beverly Hills Cop II was a commercial success, grossing approximately $300 million worldwide against a $27 million budget. It received mixed reviews from critics, although Murphy's performance was generally praised. The film also earned Academy Award and Golden Globe nominations for Best Original Song for Bob Seger's "Shakedown".

The film was followed by Beverly Hills Cop III in 1994 and Beverly Hills Cop: Axel F in 2024.

== Plot ==
In Beverly Hills, an organised criminal gang led by the ruthless Karla Fry carries out a precision robbery of a jewellery store, leaving behind an envelope marked "A" containing a cryptic code. Captain Andrew Bogomil investigates the robbery with Detective Billy Rosewood and Sergeant John Taggart, but is suspended by the egotistical new police chief, Harold Lutz, in retaliation for Rosewood contacting the FBI for assistance, believing outside help undermines his authority. On his way home, Bogomil is lured into a trap by Fry, who leaves him with near-fatal gunshot wounds and a letter marked "B".

Learning of Bogomil's attack, his friend, Detroit police detective Axel Foley, travels to Beverly Hills to investigate. After examining expertly modified bullet casings recovered from the robbery, Foley visits a local gun club, where he meets Fry—who matches the description of one of the robbery's perpetrators—and learns similar casings were produced for the club's manager, Charles Cain. Furious that Cain used traceable ammunition, his employer, businessman Maxwell Dent, orders him to kill Foley. The assassination attempt by Cain's men fails, but Foley recovers a matchbook from which he lifts Cain's fingerprint.

Foley breaks into the gun club that night and discovers a set of coordinates, which lead him, Rosewood, and Taggart to the city depository, the target of the "C" and "D" robberies. They foil the heist before pursuing the perpetrators' armored truck through Beverly Hills in a cement mixer, causing extensive collateral damage. Although the robbers escape, Foley, Rosewood, and Taggart trace the getaway vehicle to an event at the Playboy Mansion. Recognizing Fry from the gun club, Foley confronts her and Dent before they are all removed from the event.

Foley learns from Dent's accountant that Dent and Fry have applied for visas to Costa Rica. At the same time, Bogomil's daughter Jan discovers Dent's companies are in financial difficulty and that he has allowed the insurance to lapse on all of them, except for his horse racetrack, Empyrean Fields. Foley deciphers the "D" letter and learns it is signed "Carlos", the Spanish version of Charles. Realizing the letter was deliberately easier to decode, Foley deduces that Dent is framing Cain as the Alphabet robber. Dent sends Cain with Fry during the racetrack robbery. Afterwards, Fry kills Cain, making it appear that he was killed by a guard.

Lutz publicly announces that Cain was the Alphabet bandit and takes credit for the success. Foley notices red mud at the stables identical to traces found on Bogomil's running shoes. This leads Foley, Rosewood, and Taggart to Dent's nearby oil field, where Dent is using the $10 million stolen in the robberies to purchase weapons from arms dealer Nikos Thomopolis, intending to resell them in Central America for massive profit.

Foley, Rosewood, and Taggart engage Dent's men in a shootout and destroy the trucks carrying the weapons with explosives. Dent attempts to run Foley down, but Foley shoots him dead before being struck by the vehicle. Fry attempts to kill Foley, but is shot dead by Taggart.

As Dent's remaining associates attempt to flee, police reinforcements arrive and arrest Thomopolis and the rest of Dent's gang. Lutz and Mayor Egan also arrive; Lutz berates Rosewood and Taggart for their insubordination, but they finally stand up to him and prove that Dent was the mastermind behind the Alphabet crimes. Finally realizing Lutz's incompetence, the mayor dismisses him for jeopardizing the investigation and mistreating his officers.

Following his recovery, Bogomil becomes the new police chief. As Foley prepares to return to Detroit, Mayor Egan telephones Inspector Todd to thank him for Foley's assistance, prompting Todd to angrily order him back to Detroit.

== Cast ==
- Eddie Murphy as Detective Axel Foley
- Judge Reinhold as Detective Billy Rosewood
- Jürgen Prochnow as Maxwell Dent
- Ronny Cox as Captain Andrew Bogomil
- John Ashton as Sergeant John Taggart
- Brigitte Nielsen as Karla Fry
- Allen Garfield as Chief Harold Lutz
- Dean Stockwell as Charles Cain
- Gil Hill as Inspector Douglas Todd
- Gilbert Gottfried as Sidney Bernstein
- Paul Reiser as Detective Jeffrey Friedman
- Brian O'Connor as Detective Biddle
- Paul Guilfoyle as Nikos Thomopolis
- Robert Ridgely as Mayor Ted Egan
- Alice Adair as Jan Bogomil
- Glenn Withrow as Willie
- Tom Bower as Russ Fielding
- Hugh Hefner as Himself
- Frank Pesce as Carlotta
- Chris Rock as Parking Valet
- Valerie Wildman as Gun Club Receptionist
- Robert Pastorelli as Vinnie
- Tommy 'Tiny' Lister as Orvis
- John Hostetter as Stiles
- Todd Susman as the Master Builder

Additional cast members feature Ola Ray, Alana Saores, Venice Kong, Luann Lee, Rebecca Ferratti, Kymberly Paige and Kymberly Herrin as the Playboy Playmates.

== Production ==
Paramount Pictures had planned a television series based on the 1984 film Beverly Hills Cop. Eddie Murphy turned down the series but was willing to do a sequel. Producers Don Simpson and Jerry Bruckheimer hired Tony Scott to direct due to his success with the 1986 blockbuster film Top Gun. The film was originally to be set and filmed in London and Paris; however, the script was re-written after Murphy expressed a reluctance to film outside the United States.

Eddie Murphy's salary to star in the movie was $8 million. The budget of the movie was $27 million. Ronny Cox was going to have more screen time in the film, but couldn't due to his role in RoboCop. Filming began on November 10, 1986, and concluded on March 25, 1987, after 135 days of filming.

Film editor Billy Weber said:

"Marty Brest had passed on the sequel, and Tony was available. But, he wasn't a comedy guy, so after we ran the first cut, Don and Jerry just looked around, and shrugged, and said, "Huh." It wasn't a comedy – it played like a straight action movie, which made sense, because Tony was an action guy, and that's what he knew how to do best, so it was really action heavy. We just never had a great script, and it never had a chance of being as good as the first movie because the script never got there. They re-wrote the script after the first screening and more jokes were shot and added in, and it brought it up a little bit. Eddie also started to act up on the set, the primadonna behavior was starting to show, and he was always late for filming, but he got along great with Tony."

== Soundtrack ==
The song "Hold On" as sung by Keta Bill plays during the scene wherein Axel Foley (Murphy), Billy Rosewood (Judge Reinhold) and John Taggart (John Ashton) confront Maxwell Dent (Jürgen Prochnow) at the Playboy Mansion. However, the film's soundtrack album, released by MCA Records, includes only a different version sung by Corey Hart, with different lyrics. The film introduced George Michael's controversial song "I Want Your Sex", a number 2 hit on the Billboard Hot 100. It also includes "Cross My Broken Heart" by The Jets (a Top 10 hit on the Billboard Hot 100) and "Shakedown" by Bob Seger (which became a No. 1 hit on that same chart), as well as "Better Way" performed by James Ingram. The Pointer Sisters scored a moderate hit with "Be There" (#42 on the Hot 100), their single from the soundtrack. It was the second time the sisters had contributed to the Beverly Hills Cop franchise; they'd notched a top 10 single with "Neutron Dance" from the Beverly Hills Cop soundtrack. Harold Faltermeyer's 1988 album, Harold F, includes a song called "Bad Guys", which is used as part of the film's score—an instrumental section of the song plays during the opening jewelry store robbery scene, and also during several other scenes throughout the film.

The soundtrack reached No. 8 on the Billboard 200 album chart and spent 26 weeks on the charts, a far cry compared to the 49 weeks spent by the first film's soundtrack. Despite this, one song from the album, "Shakedown", was nominated for the Academy Award for Best Original Song and the Golden Globe Award for Best Original Song. However, another song from the album, "I Want Your Sex", won the Golden Raspberry Award for Worst Original Song, despite it going on to achieve a platinum certification for sales by the Recording Industry Association of America.

== Reception ==
=== Box office ===
Beverly Hills Cop II was one of the most anticipated films of 1987 and became a box office success upon release. The film debuted at number one at the US box office, earning $26.3 million on its three-day opening weekend and $33 million over the four-day Memorial Day weekend, a sales mark that would result in the film achieving that year's highest-opening weekend debut, as well as the highest three-day opening weekend of all time at the time, surpassing the $25.3 million earned by Indiana Jones and the Temple of Doom in 1984. Beverly Hills Cop II grossed $153,665,036 in the United States and Canada, becoming the third biggest hit domestically at the box office that year, after Fatal Attraction and Three Men and a Baby, and grossed $276.6 million worldwide, the second highest-grossing film worldwide that year, behind Fatal Attraction.

=== Critical reception ===
The film received mixed reviews from critics. On the review aggregator website Rotten Tomatoes, 48% of 40 critics' reviews are positive, with an average rating of 5.1/10. The website's consensus reads: "Eddie Murphy remains appealing as the wisecracking Axel Foley, but Beverly Hills Cop II doesn't take him – or the viewer – anywhere new enough to justify a sequel." Metacritic, which uses a weighted average, assigned the film a score of 48 out of 100, based on 11 critics, indicating "mixed or average" reviews. Audiences polled by CinemaScore gave the film an average grade of "A−" on an A+ to F scale.

Desson Howe of The Washington Post called it "a sequel that's as good as the original, if not better." Roger Ebert gave the film one star out of four and wrote, "What is comedy? That's a pretty basic question, I know, but Beverly Hills Cop II never thought to ask it." Janet Maslin of The New York Times wrote that the film is a skillful clone of the first film that cannot match that one's novelty or excitement. Variety called it "a noisy, numbing, unimaginative, heartless remake of the original film." Sheila Benson of the Los Angeles Times wrote, "It's hard to believe that the group who came up with the hard, clean edges of Top Gun, sleek and unfeeling though it may have been, could make a picture as crude, as muddled, as destructo-Derbyish as this one."

"Beverly Hills Cop II was probably the most successful mediocre picture in history," Murphy said. "It made $250 million worldwide, and it was a half-assed movie. Cop II was basically a rehash of Cop I, but it wasn't as spontaneous and funny [as the original]."

=== Accolades ===
Award	Category	Nominee(s)	Result
Academy Awards	Best Original Song	"Shakedown"; Music by Harold Faltermeyer and Keith Forsey; Lyrics by Harold Faltermeyer, Keith Forsey and Bob Seger	Nominated
ASCAP Film and Television Music Awards	Top Box Office Films	Harold Faltermeyer	Won
ASCAP Film and Television Music Awards	Most Performed Songs from Motion Pictures	"Shakedown"; Music by Harold Faltermeyer and Keith Forsey; Lyrics by Harold Faltermeyer, Keith Forsey and Bob Seger	Won
Golden Globe Awards	Best Original Song	"Shakedown"; Music by Harold Faltermeyer and Keith Forsey; Lyrics by Harold Faltermeyer, Keith Forsey and Bob Seger	Nominated
Golden Raspberry Awards	Worst Original Song	"I Want Your Sex"; Music and Lyrics by George Michael	Won
Golden Screen Awards			Won
MTV Video Music Awards	Best Video from a Film	Bob Seger – "Shakedown"	Nominated
NAACP Image Awards	Outstanding Actor in a Motion Picture	Eddie Murphy	Nominated
Nickelodeon Kids' Choice Awards	Favorite Movie		Won
Nickelodeon Kids' Choice Awards	Favorite Movie Actor	Eddie Murphy	Won

== Literature ==
- Tine, Robert (1987). Beverly Hills Cop II: A Novel (Mti ed.). Pocket. ISBN 0-671-64521-8.
