= Will Beall =

American screenwriter

- Born: Walnut Creek, California, U.S.
- Occupation: Screenwriter
- Spouse: Elizabeth Davis (m. 2012)

Will Beall is an American screenwriter and former Los Angeles Police Department detective. He is best known for writing the scripts for Gangster Squad (2013) and the DC Extended Universe films Aquaman (2018) and Zack Snyder's Justice League (2021), and for developing the police TV series Training Day and Deputy, which were canceled after a single season.

== Career ==
Beall launched his writing career in 2006 with the publication of his acclaimed first novel LA REX, after working for 10 years as a homicide detective and gang investigator with the Los Angeles Police Department. Beall adapted the book for Oscar-winning producer Scott Rudin and the script was featured atop The Black List, Hollywood's annual survey of the industry's favorite screenplays. Between 2009 and 2011, he was a story editor for the ABC TV show Castle, writing several episodes exploring the show's overarching plotline of the hunt for Beckett's mother's killer. Beall wrote the feature film Gangster Squad, which was released in 2013 and starred Sean Penn, Ryan Gosling and Josh Brolin. The film was based on former Los Angeles Times writer and editor Paul Lieberman's book, Gangster Squad, a non-fiction account of what he calls "the battle for Los Angeles" that took place between the police and Mickey Cohen's crew in the mid-1940s.

Beall's script for Justice League was completed prior to production of Snyder's Batman vs. Superman. In fact, the 'Knightmare' sequence from Batman vs. Superman was inspired by Beall's Justice League script. Much of the second act of Beall's original Justice League script took place in a post-apocalyptic earth where Darkseid had manipulated Superman and then used the Kryptonian to conquer the world. The surviving members of the Justice League had to join forces with villains from the DC Universe in order to defeat Darkseid by sending Flash back in time to warn Batman prior to the invasion. Many of these elements were at least partially restored in the "Snyder Cut," resulting in Beall receiving story credit.

On the strength of his Justice League script, Beall was hired to develop Aquaman as a feature. He wrote multiple drafts and ultimately received both screenplay and story credit for his work on Aquaman, which grossed $1.149 billion worldwide.

Beall was also hired by Warner Bros. to write the screenplay for a reboot of the Lethal Weapon franchise. According to IGN, Beall is writing the script to The Legend of Conan, the sequel to Conan the Barbarian. In an April 2022 article by Deadline Hollywood, Beall was announced to have written the screenplay for Beverly Hills Cop: Axel F.

Beall also did uncredited production rewrites for Non-Stop, Edge of Tomorrow, and Venom.

== Personal life ==
Beall married Castle producer and writer Elizabeth Davis on June 30, 2012, at Beltane Ranch in Sonoma Valley, California.

On January 21, 2019, Beall suffered a heart attack while working in his Pacific Palisades office, and was taken to the hospital by ambulance. While in route, Beall's heart stopped but — after 13 rounds of defibrillation and continuous CPR — "he had a return of spontaneous circulation" soon after arriving at the hospital. Beall was placed into a medically induced coma, but made a full recovery. In April 2019, he and his wife attended a ceremony for the Los Angeles firefighters and paramedics that helped save his life.

His last name is pronounced "bell."

== Writing credits ==
Film

| Year | Title | Director | Notes |
|---|---|---|---|
| 2013 | Gangster Squad | Ruben Fleischer | |
| 2018 | Aquaman | James Wan | |
| 2021 | Zack Snyder's Justice League | Zack Snyder | Story only |
| 2024 | Bad Boys: Ride or Die | Adil El Arbi; Bilall Fallah | |
| 2024 | Beverly Hills Cop: Axel F | Mark Molloy | |
| TBA | Road House 2 | Ilya Naishuller | Post-production |

Television

| Year | Title | Writer | Executive producer | Creator | Notes |
|---|---|---|---|---|---|
| 2009–2011 | Castle | Yes | No | No | Also executive story editor and story editor 34 episodes |
| 2017 | Training Day | Yes | Yes | Yes | |
| 2020 | Deputy | Yes | Yes | Yes | |
