= Beverly Hills Cop: Axel F =

2024 film by Mark Molloy

- Promotional release poster
- Directed by: Mark Molloy
- Screenplay by: Will Beall; Tom Gormican; Kevin Etten
- Story by: Will Beall
- Based on: Characters by: Danilo Bach; Daniel Petrie Jr.
- Produced by: Jerry Bruckheimer; Eddie Murphy; Chad Oman
- Starring: Eddie Murphy; Joseph Gordon-Levitt; Taylour Paige; Judge Reinhold; John Ashton; Paul Reiser; Bronson Pinchot; Kevin Bacon
- Cinematography: Edu Grau
- Edited by: Dan Lebental
- Music by: Lorne Balfe
- Production companies: Don Simpson/Jerry Bruckheimer Films (Note: Jerry Bruckheimer Films used the Don Simpson/Jerry Bruckheimer Films logo in memory of Don Simpson, who produced the first two films.); Eddie Murphy Productions
- Distributed by: Netflix
- Release date: July 3, 2024
- Running time: 118 minutes
- Country: United States
- Language: English
- Budget: $150 million

Beverly Hills Cop: Axel F is a 2024 American action comedy film directed by Mark Molloy (in his feature film directorial debut) and written by Will Beall, Tom Gormican, and Kevin Etten from a story by Beall, and produced by and starring Eddie Murphy. It is a standalone sequel to Beverly Hills Cop III (1994) and the fourth installment in the Beverly Hills Cop film series. The film also stars Joseph Gordon-Levitt, Taylour Paige, Judge Reinhold, John Ashton (in his final role), Paul Reiser, Bronson Pinchot, and Kevin Bacon. In the film, Detroit detective Axel Foley returns to Beverly Hills to protect his daughter Jane and friends while uncovering a conspiracy.

The film entered development in the mid-1990s under Murphy's production company. Various directors and screenwriters were attached over the years, including the filmmaking duo Adil El Arbi and Bilall Fallah, but the project had faced multiple issues and has undergone development hell. In April 2022, Molloy was hired to direct, with production beginning in California that August. Jerry Bruckheimer returned as producer after working on the first two films in the series. This is the first film not to be distributed by Paramount Pictures or theatrically released.

Beverly Hills Cop: Axel F was released on the streaming service Netflix on July 3, 2024. The film received mixed reviews from critics, although it was deemed a return to form for the series, and an improvement over its predecessor. It was the most-streamed film on Netflix for almost two weeks.

== Plot ==
Axel Foley remains a Detroit police detective under his friend, Deputy Chief Jeffrey Friedman. In pursuit of thieves, Axel's ensuing chase causes costly damage to the city. Jeffrey retires to protect Axel from being punished and encourages him to reconnect with his estranged daughter Jane Saunders, a defense attorney in Los Angeles. Billy Rosewood, now working as a private investigator after having a falling-out with his former partner John Taggart and resigning from the police force, calls Axel, warning him that Jane's life is in danger. He has been aiding Jane as she represents Sam Enriquez —framed for the murder of undercover Officer Copeland. Rosewood recovers evidence from the vehicle in which the murder took place, but is kidnapped by the cartel.

Axel returns to Beverly Hills, concerned when Rosewood does not respond to his calls. He visits Rosewood's office and finds a suspicious team searching it. He removes a page out of Rosewood's planner, then is chased by the group through Rodeo Drive and arrested. Taken to the Beverly Hills Police Department, Axel meets Detective Bobby Abbott, Jane's ex-boyfriend, and reunites with Taggart, now police chief. Taggart introduces Axel to Captain Cade Grant, whom he mentored as a young police cadet. Axel distrusts Grant immediately. Jane bails out her father, but resists his attempts to reconnect with her. It is revealed that, years ago during an investigation of the Detroit mafia, Axel and his family were threatened so Jane and her mother moved to Los Angeles, but he remained in Detroit and the couple divorced. The two recovered a camera from Copeland's car and deduce that Grant's team was looking for the camera's SD card containing evidence of the murder. The next day, Axel and Jane are ambushed on Wilshire Boulevard but saved by Abbott in a shootout. Axel confronts Taggart, who vehemently defends Grant and suspends Abbott.

The address in Rosewood's planner proves to be a mansion owned by Grant and used as a cartel money laundering operation. Axel and Abbott seek help from Enriquez's uncle, Chalino, head of the cartel. He tells them that Grant helps protect the cartel, and a drug shipment is leaving the port that night. Abbott and Axel are framed and arrested for drug possession by Grant to stop their snooping. Axel and Abbott escape custody and steal a helicopter, just barely surviving when it crashes. Taggart witnesses Grant's actions and is convinced of the corruption within his own team. Jane is kidnapped by Grant's thugs. Axel and Abbott go to the port and find Rosewood being held hostage; they free him when Grant calls to announce he is holding Jane and wants the SD card in return.

Axel, Rosewood, Abbott and Taggart engage in a firefight against Grant's cartel army at the cartel mansion. Axel is shot while protecting Jane, and Grant is shot in the head by Abbott. In the aftermath, Rosewood and Taggart make peace. With the recovered evidence in the SD card Rosewood had, the charges against Enriquez are dropped, and Axel makes amends with Jane. A few days later, Axel reunites with Rosewood and Taggart, and the trio head out for a steak dinner.

== Cast ==
- Eddie Murphy as Axel Foley
- Joseph Gordon-Levitt as Detective Bobby Abbott
- Taylour Paige as Jane Saunders
- Judge Reinhold as Inspector Billy Rosewood
- John Ashton as Chief John Taggart
- Paul Reiser as Deputy Chief Jeffrey Friedman
- Bronson Pinchot as Serge
- Damien Diaz as Sam Enriquez
- Kevin Bacon as Captain Cade Grant
- Mark Pellegrino as Beck
- Nasim Pedrad as Ashley De La Rosa
- Luis Guzmán as Chalino Valdemoro

Christopher McDonald makes a cameo as a golf player. Despite not appearing in the film, Gil Hill (who died in 2016) and Ronny Cox are seen in photographs as Inspector Todd and Chief Bogomil, respectively. Murphy's real-life daughter, Bria Murphy, appears as Renee Minnick, an officer who arrests Foley after he arrives in Beverly Hills.

== Production ==
=== Development ===
A fourth entry in the Beverly Hills Cop series was initially announced for release in the mid-1990s, under the production of Eddie Murphy's production company, Eddie Murphy Productions, before production fizzled out. In June 2001, it was announced that Jason Richman had been hired to write a film treatment for Beverly Hills Cop IV after executives were impressed with his rewrites of Bad Company. The film was re-announced in 2006, when producer Jerry Bruckheimer announced his intention to resurrect the film series, though he eventually gave up his option to produce the film, passing production duties to Lorenzo di Bonaventura.

In September 2006, a script, which was an amalgamation of several earlier drafts, was presented to Murphy, who was reported to be "very happy" with the outline, described as an attempt to recapture the "feel of the original." Murphy admitted one of his motivations for making a fourth Beverly Hills Cop film was to make up for the fact that the third film was "horrible" and "he didn't want to leave (the series) like that."

In May 2008, Rush Hour director Brett Ratner was officially named director, promising the film would return under the series' standard "R" rating rather than as a rumored watered-down PG-13. In July 2008, Michael Brandt and Derek Haas were hired as screenwriters to improve on the existing script and complete a new script under the working title Beverly Hills Cop 2009, which would see Foley return to Beverly Hills to investigate the murder of his friend Billy Rosewood. The script was eventually rejected, leaving Ratner to work on a new idea. In an interview with Empire magazine, Ratner said, "I'm working very hard on the fourth. It's very difficult, especially since there were three before. We're trying to figure out some important things, like, where do we start? Is Axel retired? Is he in Beverly Hills? Is he on vacation? Does Judge Reinhold return as the loveable Billy Rosewood? Many questions to figure out, but I'm hoping to have a script before film disappears from our existence."

Although Murphy committed to the project, it was unconfirmed if the series' other principal actors, Judge Reinhold, John Ashton, Ronny Cox, and Bronson Pinchot, would return. In late 2009, Ratner said that he was trying to convince Reinhold and Ashton to reprise their roles. Harold Faltermeyer's "Axel F" definitely was returning for the proposed fourth installment with Ratner quoted, "It'll be back but it'll be a whole new interpretation." On November 15, 2010, Ratner said in an interview with MTV that there was still a possibility that they would make a fourth film, but that it wouldn't be "anytime soon."

In October 2011, Murphy discussed a possible fourth film, saying, "They're not doing it. What I'm trying to do now is produce a TV show starring Axel Foley's son, and Axel is the chief of police now in Detroit. I'd do the pilot, show up here and there. None of the movie scripts were right; it was trying to force the premise. If you have to force something, you shouldn't be doing it. It was always a rehash of the old thing. It was always wrong." In late summer 2013, after CBS decided to pass on the TV series, Paramount decided to move forward with the fourth film. On September 13, 2013, Jerry Bruckheimer said he was again in talks to produce. On December 6, 2013, it was again announced that Murphy would reprise the role of Axel Foley, and Ratner would direct. Murphy was paid $15 million for his involvement. On May 2, 2014, Deadline announced that Josh Appelbaum and Andre Nemec would be writing the screenplay.

On June 27, 2014, in an interview with Rolling Stone, Murphy discussed returning to the edgier type of character of Axel Foley after years of making family-friendly films. "I haven't done a street guy, working class, a blue-collar character in ages so maybe it's like, 'Oh, wow, I didn't remember he was able to do that,'" Murphy said. According to studio reports on the film's plot, Foley would return to Detroit after leaving his job in Beverly Hills, and he will be faced with the coldest winter on record as he navigates the new rules and old enemies of one of America's most tenacious cities. The state of Michigan approved $13.5 million in film incentives, based on an estimated $56.6 million of filmmaker spending in the state. The film would be shot in and around Detroit and was estimated to provide jobs for 352 workers. The film was originally scheduled for a March 25, 2016 release, but on May 6, 2015, Paramount Pictures pulled Beverly Hills Cop IV from its release schedule due to script concerns. On June 14, 2016, Deadline Hollywood reported that Adil El Arbi and Bilall Fallah, directors of the Belgian drama Black, would direct the film. In September 2017, Arbi and Fallah stated their interest in casting Tom Hardy or Channing Tatum to star alongside Murphy.

In August 2019, the film was described as still in the developmental phase. On October 1, 2019, in an interview with Collider, Murphy announced that principal photography would begin after the filming of Coming 2 America. On November 14, 2019, Deadline Hollywood announced that Paramount Pictures made a one-time license deal, with an option for a sequel, with Netflix to develop the film. In May 2020, after delays in the filmmaking business caused by the COVID-19 pandemic, Arbi and Fallah confirmed they were still attached as co-directors and that a new screenwriter was working on a new script for the film. In April 2022, Arbi and Fallah left the film to focus on Batgirl (prior to its cancellation), with Mark Molloy hired to replace them. In the same article, Will Beall was announced as having written the script. In March 2023, Beall, Tom Gormican, and Kevin Etten were given credit for the screenplay, with Beall receiving story credit.

=== Casting ===
In August 2022, Taylour Paige and Joseph Gordon-Levitt were cast in undisclosed roles. In the same month, Paul Reiser and John Ashton were confirmed to reprise their roles as Jeffrey Friedman and John Taggart, respectively, returning to the roles 37 years after their performances in Beverly Hills Cop II. In September, Judge Reinhold and Bronson Pinchot were confirmed to reprise their roles as Billy Rosewood and Serge, respectively, returning to the roles 30 years after their performances in Beverly Hills Cop III. That same month, it was announced that Kevin Bacon had joined the cast.

=== Filming ===
In February 2022, the film entered pre-production and received a California state tax credit of $16 million. Principal photography began on August 29, 2022, in San Bernardino and other areas in California for 58 days, to generate $78 million in qualified spending in tax incentives. Additional filming occurred in Detroit in late November and early December 2022, although Murphy himself did not travel to the city. A December 3 NHL game between the Red Wings and the Vegas Golden Knights at Little Caesars Arena served as backdrop for the prologue, but the team locker room seen in the film was a set.

=== Post-production ===
Dan Lebental served as the editor.

== Music ==
As the film reuses most of the music from the first two films, a compilation soundtrack was not commissioned, making it the first in the franchise to not have an album featuring the songs heard in the film unlike its predecessors. However, an original song "Here We Go!" was written for the film, by rapper-singer Lil Nas X and released as a single on June 28, 2024.

Lorne Balfe composed the film's score, which incorporates the "Axel F" theme composed by Harold Faltermeyer from the first film. An album containing the film's score was released through Netflix Music on July 3, 2024.

== Release ==
The film was released on the streaming service Netflix on July 3, 2024. To promote the release of the film, a promo featuring the animated character Crazy Frog was released. Crazy Frog previously released a cover of the franchise's theme song, "Axel F", in 2005.

== Reception ==
=== Audience viewership ===
After premiering on July 3 on Netflix, the film earned 41 million views in five days. It also had 80.7 million hours viewed. During its second week, Beverly Hills Cop: Axel F remained the most-watched film on Netflix, scoring 22.2 million views and 43.7 million hours viewed.

=== Critical response ===
On the review aggregator website Rotten Tomatoes, 67% of 200 critics' reviews are positive, with an average rating of 6.1/10. The website's consensus reads: "Content to let a very game Eddie Murphy bring all the heat, the fourth Beverly Hills Cop coasts on nostalgia but marks a welcome return for Axel Foley." Metacritic, which uses a weighted average, assigned the film a score of 53 out of 100, based on 47 critics, indicating "mixed or average" reviews.

Brian Tallerico, writing for RogerEbert.com, gave the film three out of four stars, stating that the film is "a shockingly entertaining diversion.... From the beginning, Beverly Hills Cop: Axel F is buoyant and playful in a way that legacy sequels usually aren't allowed to be, and that was arguably missing in the more leaden second and third films in this series."

Robert Daniels of The New York Times wrote, "While this installment isn't nearly as woeful as Beverly Hills Cop III, it doesn't have the charm or energy of the first two films either. It's a limp, desperate action comedy with few memorable moments."

=== Accolades ===
Beverly Hills Cop: Axel F received nominations for Location Manager of the Year – Studio Feature and Location Team of the Year – Studio Feature at the 2023 California On Location Awards.

== Future ==
On June 21, 2024, Eddie Murphy and Jerry Bruckheimer revealed that a fifth Beverly Hills Cop film was already in development.
