= Danilo Bach =

American screenwriter and film producer

Danilo Bachelor
- Born: March 1, 1944 (age 81); United States
- Occupation(s): Film producer, screenwriter

Danilo Bach (born March 1, 1944) is an American screenwriter and film producer.

== Awards and nominations ==
- Best Original Screenplay (Nomination) for Beverly Hills Cop, 1984

== Filmography ==
- The Beast Within (uncredited) (1982)
- Beverly Hills Cop (1984)
- April Fool's Day (1986)
- Beverly Hills Cop II (1987; characters created by)
- Someone to Watch Over Me (uncredited) (1987)
- Beverly Hills Cop III (1994; characters created by)
- Escape Clause (1996)
- 14 Hours (2005)
