= Axel Foley =

Fictional character

- Beverly Hills Cop character
- Eddie Murphy as Axel Foley
- First appearance: Beverly Hills Cop (1984)
- Last appearance: Beverly Hills Cop: Axel F (2024)
- Created by: Danilo Bach; Daniel Petrie Jr.
- Portrayed by: Eddie Murphy

In-universe information
- Full name: Axel James Foley
- Occupation: Detective
- Affiliation: Detroit Police Department
- Children: Jane Saunders (daughter)
- Origin: Detroit, Michigan, United States
- Nationality: American

Detective Axel James Foley is a fictional character, portrayed by Eddie Murphy, and is the titular protagonist of the Beverly Hills Cop film series. He is ranked No. 55 on Empire magazine's 2008 and 2020 lists of The 100 Greatest Movie Characters. Sylvester Stallone was originally intended to be cast as Axel Foley.

== Beverly Hills Cop ==
Detroit Police Department plainclothes detective Axel Foley is delighted when he receives a surprise visit from his best friend Mikey Tandino, who lives in Hollywood, California. Mikey is soon killed by a man named Zack. Foley goes to Beverly Hills, California, to find Mikey's assailant (since Mikey told Foley he had a job at an art gallery in Beverly Hills) where Beverly Hills Police Department Lieutenant Andrew Bogomil assigns Detective Billy Rosewood and Sergeant John Taggart to keep an eye on Foley. Foley visits his childhood friend Jenny Summers, who works at the art gallery. With Jenny's help, Foley discovers that Zack works for Jenny's boss, Victor Maitland, the man who owns the gallery. Maitland is a drug kingpin who is using the gallery as a front, and Maitland ordered Zack to kill Mikey after Maitland found Mikey had stolen some of his bonds. Billy, Taggart, and Foley head to Maitland's mansion to apprehend Maitland. Foley and Bogomil simultaneously shoot and kill Maitland.

== Beverly Hills Cop II ==
Detroit cop Axel Foley is watching the news on TV when the reporter tells a story that Foley's friend, Beverly Hills Police Department Captain Andrew Bogomil, has been shot. Foley heads to Beverly Hills to visit Bogomil in the hospital, and is reunited with Bogomil's daughter, Jan, and Detective Billy Rosewood and Sergeant John Taggart. Rosewood and Taggart decide to let Foley help them find the woman who tried to kill Bogomil, even though verbally abusive police chief Harold Lutz has been trying to find a reason to fire Rosewood and Taggart, forcing the three to work covertly to avoid Lutz's interference. Foley, Rosewood, and Taggart soon discover that the Alphabet robberies, a series of robberies that have been going on in the area, are masterminded by weapons kingpin Maxwell Dent, who had sent his chief henchwoman Karla Fry to try to kill Bogomil because Bogomil had been after Dent. With this information, Foley, Rosewood, and Taggart try to find Dent and Karla.

== Beverly Hills Cop III ==
One night in Detroit, during a shoot-out at a chop shop, Axel Foley sees his boss, Inspector Douglas Todd, deliberately murdered by a man named Ellis Dewald. With his dying breath, Inspector Todd asks Axel "Axel, are you on a coffee break?" and tells him to "go and get that son of a bitch". The evidence at the scene points to Wonder World, a theme park in Beverly Hills, California. Foley does some looking around, and finds the killer's vehicle, which contains evidence of suspected counterfeiting.

In Beverly Hills, Axel is reunited with his friend Billy Rosewood, who tells Axel that John Taggart is now retired and living in Phoenix, Arizona. Rosewood is now the deputy director of Operations for Joint Systems Interdepartmental Operational Command (DDOJSIOC). Billy also has a new partner named Jon Flint. Foley checks out Wonder World, which is owned by Dave "Uncle Dave" Thornton. At Wonder World, Foley rescues two kids who are stuck on a ride that broke down, and after this, Foley is taken to see the park's head of security, Ellis Dewald, and Foley recognizes Dewald as Inspector Todd's killer. Flint refuses to believe this, because Dewald is one of Flint's friends, but in actuality, Dewald runs a counterfeiting ring that uses the theme park as a front.

Foley is also falling in love with Janice Perkins, who works at the park. When Dave gets shot by Dewald in the chest with his gun, Foley is accused of being the man who shot Dave after rushing him to the hospital. But Dave then tells the entire town it was not Foley who shot him; it was their idol, Dewald. With the - rather reluctant - help of Billy, Foley sets out to prove his innocence and get revenge on Dewald and Sanderson. This results in a chase and shootout with Sanderson and Dewald's security men all across the theme park.

Finally, in the park's prehistoric world ride, Foley manages to kill Dewald and avenges Todd but gets shot himself. As he sits down to recover, Agent Steve Fulbright, who had been helping Foley, suddenly shows up after he killed Sanderson. Foley reveals that he has come to suspect that Fulbright is also involved in the counterfeit scheme. His suspicions are true, but as the corrupt agent prepares to shoot him, Foley jumps him, and in the ensuing tussle Fulbright is accidentally killed when his gun is fired. One of the shots, however, over penetrates and nicks Flint, who has just arrived having received a call and discovering Dewald's treachery and that he was indeed the one who shot Dave; both are eventually joined by Rosewood, who has been seriously wounded by the security men.

In the end, Flint, Rosewood and Foley are all injured, and Janice invites Foley to an upcoming Tunnel of Love Ride but not before the latest character of the theme park has been introduced — Axel Fox and Dave thanks Foley for bringing Dewald to justice.

== Unaired television pilot ==
In early 2013, CBS ordered a pilot with Brandon T. Jackson starring as Axel Foley's son, Aaron. The hourlong crime drama was produced by the critically acclaimed writer Shawn Ryan, who created The Shield and The Chicago Code. In May 2013, however, CBS decided to pass on the Beverly Hills Cop TV series.

In February 2015, Eddie Murphy stated that his cameo appearance in the pilot ironically doomed the show's chances: "I was gonna be in the pilot, and they thought I should be recurring. I'm not gonna do Beverly Hills Cop on TV. I remember when they tested it — they had this little knob that you turn if you like it or you don't like it. So when Axel shows up in the pilot, some people turned the knob so much, they broke it. So the network decided 'if he isn't recurring, then this isn't gonna happen'. So it didn't happen." In 2019, Murphy reiterated this statement:

The reason that didn't get picked up was because [the studio] thought that I was going to be in this show, because [the lead] was my son: "And you're going to pop in every now and then". I was like, "I ain't popping in shit". "Well, we ain't making this TV show". I was in the pilot, but they wanted me to be there every week. The pilot was really good. It tested where they have these knobs [that you] turn if you like it. And whenever I came on the screen, Axel Foley would come on the screen, they turned it so they literally broke the knobs on the thing. It was like, "Damn, they breaking knobs?"

== Beverly Hills Cop: Axel F ==
Foley has returned to Beverly Hills after his daughter Jane's life is threatened. She and Foley team up with her ex-boyfriend Detective Bobby Abbott and his old pals, John Taggart and Billy Rosewood, to uncover a conspiracy between the Beverly Hills Police, and a drug trafficking and money laundering operation.

== Equipment ==
Foley's signature sidearm is a 9mm Browning Hi-Power pistol, which he carries in all four films. He wears a Detroit Lions letterman jacket bearing a number 67 in the films.
