= Mark Molloy =

Australian film director

- Born: Australia
- Occupation: Film director

Mark Molloy is an Australian commercial, television, and film director. He made his feature film directorial debut with Beverly Hills Cop: Axel F (2024).

== Career ==
Molloy began his career in 1996 as a Senior Designer at Why Not and Associates in London, working with brands such as Nike, Virgin Records, and the BBC.

In 2020, Molloy directed a television series for Quibi about how fake news influenced the United States 2016 Presidential election, starring Fionn Whitehead and executive produced by Matt Reeves. The series was shot in Ukraine before and during the COVID-19 pandemic. Production on the series was halted when Quibi shut down in the late fall of 2020.

Molloy started directing television commercials in the early 2000s. His work has been broadcast during the Super Bowl. His branded short film for Apple "The Underdogs" won several awards, including four Gold Cannes Lions, and earned him a nomination for Outstanding Directorial Achievement in Commercials at the 72nd Directors Guild of America Awards. Molloy continued this work with Apple during the COVID-19 pandemic with a sequel titled "The Whole Working-From-Home Thing". The film was shot by Academy Award-winning cinematographer Greig Fraser and won an "innovation-in-lockdown" award at The One Show. In 2021, Molloy won Best Director at the Shots Awards The Americas. Molloy is represented as a director by production company SMUGGLER.

In April 2022, Molloy was announced as the director of Beverly Hills Cop: Axel F for Netflix, replacing Adil El Arbi and Bilall Fallah after the duo wanted to focus on the unproduced Batgirl.
