= List of awards and nominations received by Eddie Murphy =

List of Eddie Murphy awards
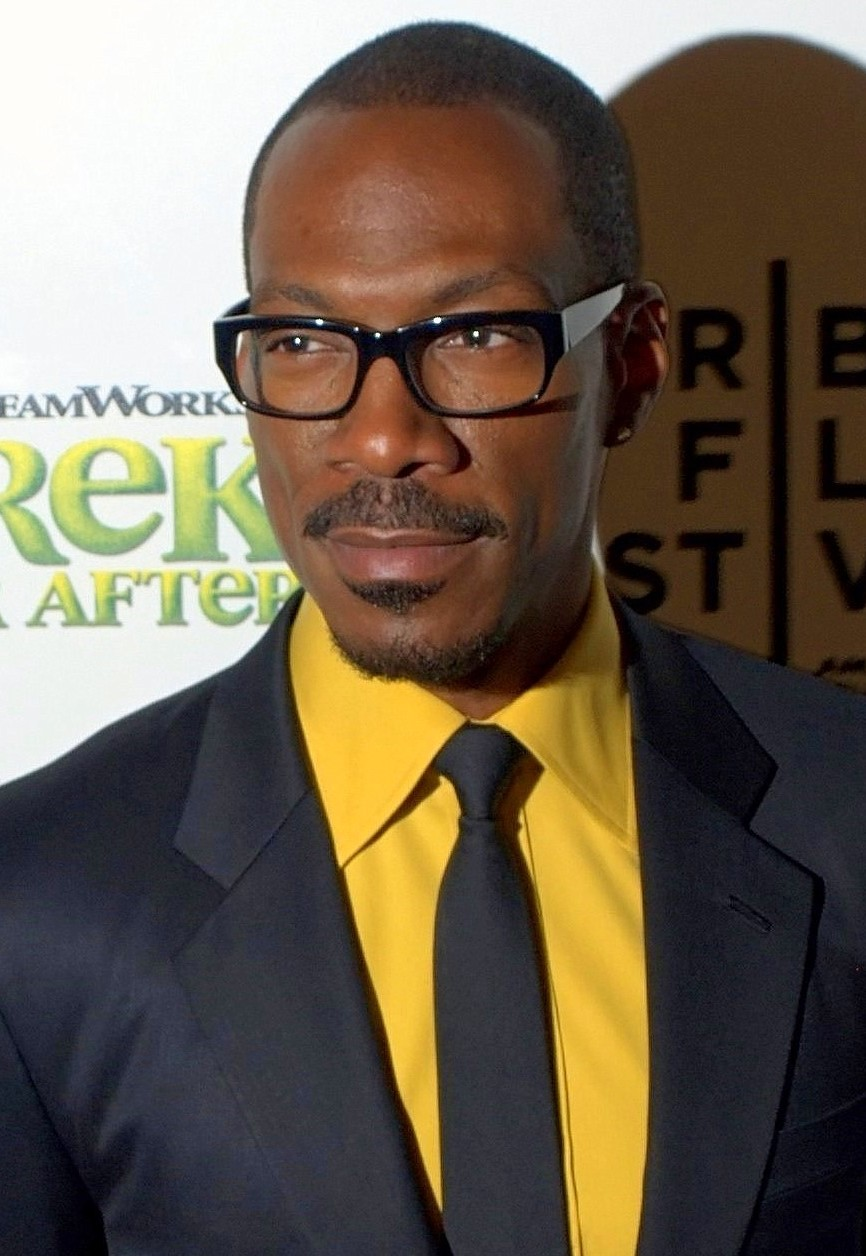
- Murphy at the 2010 Tribeca Festival
Award	Wins	Nominations
Academy Awards	0	1
British Academy Film Awards	0	1
Golden Globe Awards	1	6
Grammy Awards	1	3
Primetime Emmy Award	1	5
Screen Actors Guild Awards	1	2

The following is a list of awards and nominations received by American actor Eddie Murphy.

Murphy earned both a Grammy Award for Best Comedy Album for Eddie Murphy: Comedian (1983), and an Primetime Emmy Award for Outstanding Guest Actor in a Comedy Series for hosting Saturday Night Live (2019).

He has received Golden Globe Award nominations for his performances in 48 Hrs., the Beverly Hills Cop series, Trading Places, The Nutty Professor, and Dolemite Is My Name. In 2007, he won the Golden Globe for Best Supporting Actor and received a nomination for the Academy Award for Best Supporting Actor for his portrayal of soul singer James "Thunder" Early in Dreamgirls.

On April 18, 2026, Murphy was presented with the American Film Institute's 51st AFI Life Achievement Award.

== Major associations ==
=== Academy Awards ===
Year	Category	Nominated work	Result	Ref.
2007	Best Supporting Actor	Dreamgirls	Nominated	

=== BAFTA Awards ===
Year	Category	Nominated work	Result	Ref.
British Academy Film Awards
2002	Best Actor in a Supporting Role	Shrek	Nominated	

=== Golden Globe Awards ===
Year	Category	Nominated work	Result	Ref.
1983	New Star of the Year – Actor	48 Hrs.	Nominated	
1984	Best Actor – Motion Picture Musical or Comedy	Trading Places	Nominated	
1985	Best Actor – Motion Picture Musical or Comedy	Beverly Hills Cop	Nominated	
1997	Best Actor – Motion Picture Musical or Comedy	The Nutty Professor	Nominated	
2007	Best Supporting Actor – Motion Picture	Dreamgirls	Won	
2020	Best Actor – Motion Picture Musical or Comedy	Dolemite Is My Name	Nominated	
2023	Cecil B. DeMille Award		Honoured	

=== Grammy Awards ===
Year	Category	Nominated work	Result	Ref.
1983	Best R&B Instrumental Performance	”Boogie in Your Butt"	Nominated	
1983	Best Comedy Album	Eddie Murphy	Nominated	
1984	Best Comedy Album	Eddie Murphy: Comedian	Won	

=== Emmy Award ===
Year	Category	Nominated work	Result	Ref.
Primetime Emmy Awards
1983	Outstanding Supporting Actor in a Comedy Series	Saturday Night Live	Nominated	
1984	Outstanding Performance in a Variety or Music Program	Saturday Night Live	Nominated	
1984	Outstanding Writing for a Variety Series	Saturday Night Live	Nominated	
1999	Outstanding Animated Program	The PJs: He's Gotta Have It	Nominated	
2020	Outstanding Guest Actor in a Comedy Series	Saturday Night Live: Host: Eddie Murphy	Won	

=== Screen Actors Guild Award ===
Year	Category	Nominated work	Result	Ref.
2007	Outstanding Actor in a Supporting Role	Dreamgirls	Won	
2007	Outstanding Ensemble in a Motion Picture	Dreamgirls	Nominated	

== Critics awards ==
Award	Year	Category	Nominated work	Result	Ref.
African-American Film Critics Association	2006	Dreamgirls	Best Supporting Actor	Won	
African-American Film Critics Association	2019	Dolemite Is My Name	Best Actor	Won	
Central Ohio Film Critics Association	2007	Dreamgirls	Best Supporting Actor	Won	
Chicago Film Critics Association	2006	Dreamgirls	Best Supporting Actor	Nominated	
Critics' Choice Movie Awards	2007	Dreamgirls	Best Supporting Actor	Won	
Critics' Choice Movie Awards	2007	Dreamgirls	Best Acting Ensemble	Nominated	
Critics' Choice Movie Awards	2020	Dolemite Is My Name	Best Actor	Nominated	
Critics' Choice Movie Awards	2020	—N/a	Award for Lifetime Achievement	Honored	
Dallas–Fort Worth Film Critics Association	2006	Dreamgirls	Best Supporting Actor	Nominated	
Los Angeles Film Critics Association	1996	The Nutty Professor	Best Actor	Nominated	
Los Angeles Online Film Critics Society	2020	Dolemite Is My Name	Best Actor	Nominated	
National Society of Film Critics	1997	The Nutty Professor	Best Actor	Won	
New York Film Critics Circle	2006	Dreamgirls	Best Supporting Actor	Nominated	
Online Film Critics Society	1999	The PJs	Best Voice-Over Performance	Nominated	
Online Film Critics Society	1999	Mulan	Best Family Actor	Nominated	
Online Film Critics Society	2007	Dreamgirls	Best Supporting Actor	Nominated	
Online Film Critics Society	2007	Dreamgirls	Best Music - Original Song "Patience"	Nominated	
Online Film Critics Society	2007	Dreamgirls	Online Film Critics Society Award, Best Supporting Actor	Nominated	
San Diego Film Critics Society	2019	Dolemite Is My Name	Best Actor	Nominated	
San Diego Film Critics Society	2019	Dolemite Is My Name	Best Comedic Performance	Nominated	
St. Louis Film Critics Association	2006	Dreamgirls	Best Supporting Actor	Nominated	
Women Film Critics Circle	2007	Norbit	Hall of Shame	Won	

== Other associations ==
=== American Cinematheque Award ===
Year	Nominated work	Category	Result	Ref.
1987	—N/a	Gala Tribute	Won	

=== American Comedy Awards ===
Year	Nominated work	Category	Result	Ref.
1997	The Nutty Professor	Funniest Lead Actor in a Motion Picture	Nominated	

=== Annie Awards ===
Year	Nominated work	Category	Result	Ref.
1999	The PJs	Best Individual Achievement for Voice Acting in an Animated Television Production	Nominated	
2001	Shrek	Best Individual Achievement for Voice Acting by a Male Performer in an Animated Feature	Won	
2008	Shrek the Halls	Best Voice Acting in an Animated Television Production	Nominated	

=== BET Awards ===
Year	Nominated work	Category	Result	Ref.
2002	Dr. Dolittle 2	Best Actor	Nominated	
2002	Showtime	Best Actor	Nominated	
2002	Shrek	Best Actor	Nominated	
2007	Dreamgirls	Best Actor	Nominated	
2007	Norbit	Best Actor	Nominated	

=== Black Reel Awards ===
Year	Nominated work	Category	Result	Ref.
2000	Life	Outstanding Film (shared with Brian Grazer)	Nominated	
2000	Bowfinger	Outstanding Actor	Nominated	
2002	Shrek	Outstanding Supporting Actor	Nominated	
2007	Dreamgirls	Best Supporting Actor	Nominated	

=== Blockbuster Entertainment Awards ===
Year	Nominated work	Category	Result	Ref.
1997	The Nutty Professor	Favorite Lead Actor - Comedy	Won	
1999	Dr. Dolittle	Favorite Lead Actor - Comedy	Nominated	
2000	Life	Favorite Comedy Team (shared with Martin Lawrence)	Nominated	
2000	Bowfinger	Favorite Comedy Team (shared with Steve Martin)	Nominated	
2001	Nutty Professor 2	Favorite Lead Actor - Comedy	Nominated	

=== Bravo Otto Award ===
Year	Nominated work	Category	Result	Ref.
1987	Beverly Hills Cop II	Best Lead Actor	Nominated	
1988	Coming to America	Best Lead Actor	Nominated	

=== CinEuphoria Award ===
Year	Nominated work	Category	Result	Ref.
2018	—N/a	Honorary Award	Won	

=== Golden Raspberry Awards ===
Year	Nominated work	Category	Result	Ref.
1990	Harlem Nights	Worst Director	Nominated	
1990	Harlem Nights	Worst Screenplay	Won	
2003	The Adventures of Pluto Nash, I Spy and Showtime	Worst Actor	Nominated	
2003	The Adventures of Pluto Nash, I Spy and Showtime	Worst Screen Couple	Nominated (Note: Eddie Murphy and either Robert De Niro in Showtime, Owen Wilson in I Spy or himself cloned in The Adventures of Pluto Nash)	
2008	Norbit	Worst Actor	Won (Note: As the character of Norbit)	
2008	Norbit	Worst Supporting Actor	Won (Note: As the character of Mr. Wong)	
2008	Norbit	Worst Supporting Actress	Won (Note: As the character of Rasputia)	
2008	Norbit	Worst Screen Couple	Nominated (Note: Eddie Murphy (as Norbit) and either Eddie Murphy (as Mr. Wong) or Eddie Murphy (as Rasputia))	
2008	Norbit	Worst Screenplay	Nominated	
2009	Meet Dave	Worst Actor	Nominated	
2009	Meet Dave	Worst Screen Couple	Nominated (Note: Eddie Murphy in Eddie Murphy)	
2010	The Adventures of Pluto Nash, I Spy, Imagine That, Meet Dave, Norbit and Showtime	Worst Actor of the Decade	Won	
2010	Imagine That	Worst Actor	Nominated	
2013	A Thousand Words	Worst Actor	Nominated	
2020	Dolemite Is My Name	Razzie Redeemer Award	Won	

=== Golden Schmoes Award ===
Year	Nominated work	Category	Result	Ref.
2001	Shrek	Coolest Character of the Year	Nominated	

=== Hollywood Film Festival Award ===
Year	Nominated work	Category	Result	Ref.
2016	—N/a	Career Achievement Award	Won	

=== MTV Movie & TV Awards ===
Year	Nominated work	Category	Result	Ref.
1997	The Nutty Professor	Best Male Performance	Nominated	
1997	The Nutty Professor	Best Comedic Performance	Nominated	
2001	Nutty Professor 2	Best Comedic Performance	Nominated	
2002	Shrek	Best Comedic Performance	Nominated	
2002	Shrek	Best On-Screen Team (shared with Cameron Diaz & Mike Myers)	Nominated	

=== NAACP Image Awards ===
Year	Nominated work	Category	Result	Ref.
1983	Trading Places	Outstanding Lead Actor in a Motion Picture	Won	
1990	—N/a	Entertainer of the Year	Won	
1997	The Nutty Professor	Outstanding Lead Actor in a Motion Picture	Nominated	
2007	Dreamgirls	Outstanding Supporting Actor in a Motion Picture	Nominated	
2012	Tower Heist	Outstanding Lead Actor in a Motion Picture	Nominated	
2020	Dolemite Is My Name	Outstanding Lead Actor in a Motion Picture	Nominated	

=== Nickelodeon Kids' Choice Awards ===
Year	Nominated work	Category	Result	Ref.
1988	Beverly Hills Cop II	Favorite Movie Actor	Won	
1989	Coming to America	Favorite Movie Actor	Nominated	
1990	Harlem Nights	Favorite Movie Actor	Nominated	
1991	TBA	Favorite Movie Actor	Nominated	
1999	Dr. Dolittle	Favorite Movie Actor	Nominated	
2001	Nutty Professor 2	Favorite Movie Actor	Nominated	
2002	Shrek	Favorite Voice from an Animated Movie	Won	
2002	Dr. Dolittle 2	Favorite Movie Actor	Nominated	
2004	The Haunted Mansion; Daddy Day Care	Favorite Movie Actor	Nominated	
2005	Shrek 2	Favorite Voice from an Animated Movie	Nominated	
2008	Shrek the Third	Favorite Voice from an Animated Movie	Won	
2008	Norbit	Favorite Movie Actor	Nominated	
2011	Shrek Forever After	Favorite Voice from an Animated Movie	Won	

=== Online Film & Television Association Award ===
Year	Nominated work	Category	Result	Ref.
1997	The Nutty Professor	Best Lead Actor - Comedy or Musical	Nominated	

=== People's Choice Awards ===
Year	Nominated work	Category	Result	Ref.
1985	Beverly Hills Cop	Favorite All-Around Male Entertainer	Won	
1989	Coming to America	Favorite Comedy Motion Picture Actor	Won	
2002	Shrek	Favorite Motion Picture Star in a Comedy	Won	

=== Satellite Awards ===
Year	Nominated work	Category	Result	Ref.
1997	The Nutty Professor	Best Lead Actor in a Motion Picture – Comedy or Musical	Nominated	
2001	Nutty Professor 2	Best Lead Actor in a Motion Picture – Comedy or Musical	Nominated	
2016	Mr. Church	Best Supporting Actor – Motion Picture	Nominated	

=== Saturn Awards ===
Year	Nominated work	Category	Result	Ref.
1997	The Nutty Professor	Best Actor	Won	
2002	Shrek	Best Supporting Actor	Nominated	

=== ShoWest Convention Award ===
Year	Nominated work	Category	Result	Ref.
1985	Beverly Hills Cop	Star of the Year	Won	

=== Walk of Fame ===
Year	Nominated work	Category	Result	Ref.
1996	The Nutty Professor	Star on the Walk of Fame - Motion Picture 7000 Hollywood, Blvd.	Won	

== Notes ==
Eddie Murphy was nominated for several awards for Boomerang : https://www.imdb.com/title/tt0103859/awards/
