= Skeleton in the Closet =

Skeleton in the Closet or Skeleton in the Cupboard may refer to:

- Skeleton in the closet, a colloquial phrase and idiom used to describe an undisclosed fact

== Literature ==
- Skeletons in the Closet, 1982 novel by Elizabeth Linington
- A Skeleton in the Closet: A Novel, 1893 novel by E. D. E. N. Southworth
- "The Skeleton in the Closet", 1860s short story by Edward Everett Hale
- The Skeleton in the Closet, 2003 children's book by Curtis Jobling
- The Skeleton in the Closet - A Halloween Tradition, 2013 Children's book by Chad Shea, illustrated by Danielle Beu of The Beu Sisters
- The Skeleton in the Cupboard, 1860 novel by Harriet Anne Scott
- The Skeleton in the Cupboard, 1988 novel by Anna Haycraft
- Cakes and Ale: or, the Skeleton in the Cupboard, 1930 novel by W. Somerset Maugham

== Film ==
- Skeleton in the Closet (1965 film) (also known as Secrets Behind the Wall), a Japanese film by Kōji Wakamatsu
- Skeletons in the Closet (2001 film), a film starring Treat Williams
- Skeletons in the Closet (2007 film), a Korean film nominated for the 2nd Asian Film Awards
- Skeletons in the Closet (film), an American horror film starring Cuba Gooding Jr.

== Music ==
=== Albums ===
- Skeletons from the Closet: The Best of Grateful Dead, 1974 album by the Grateful Dead
- R&B Skeletons in the Closet, 1986 album by George Clinton
- Skeletons in the Closet (Oingo Boingo album), 1989
- Skeletons in the Closet (Venom album), 1993 album by Venom
- Skeletons in the Closet, 1996 album by The Sharp
- Skeletons in the Closet (Gamma Ray album), 2003
- Skeletons in the Closet (Children of Bodom album), 2009

=== Songs ===
- "The Skeleton in the Closet", by Louis Armstrong and his band
- "Skeleton in the Closet", by the Cornbugs on the 2001 album Cemetery Pinch
- "Skeletons in the Closet", by Alice Cooper on the 1981 album Special Forces
- "Skeletons in the Closet", by Infernäl Mäjesty on the 1987 album None Shall Defy
- "Skeletons in the Closet", by Pet Shop Boys in the 2023 EP Lost
- "Skeletons in the Closet", by Nat Gonella & His Georgians
- "Skeleton In The Cupboard", 1953 composition by Leslie Statham
- "A Skeleton in the Closet", by Anthrax on the 1987 album Among the Living
- "Skeleton in Closet", by Eddie Murphy on the 1997 album Greatest Comedy Hits

== Television ==
- "The Skeleton in the Cupboard" (Yes Minister)
- "Skeleton in the Closet" (Roseanne)
- "The Skeleton In The Cupboard" (2point4 Children)
- "Skeletons in the Closet", episode 2 of Beetlejuice
- "Lil' Miss /Skeletons In The Closet", episode 73 of Cold Case Files
- "Skeletons in the Closet", final episode of Legend
- "Skeletons in the Closet", episode 153 of G.I. Joe: A Real American Hero
- "Skeletons in the Closet", episode of Spenser: For Hire
- "Skeleton in the Cupboard", episode 11 of The Adventurer
- "Skeleton in the Cupboard", double episode of The Ghosts of Motley Hall
- "Skeletons in the Closet", episode 11 of The Legend of Korra
- "Jerangkung Dalam Almari" ("Skeletons in the Closet"), episode 6 of Gol & Gincu
- "Skeletons in the Closet", season 2, episode 7 of Nightmare Next Door
