= MGM Home Entertainment =

Home video distribution arm of Metro-Goldwyn-Mayer

MGM Home Entertainment LLC
- Trade name: MGM Home Entertainment
- Formerly: MGM Home Video, Inc. (1978–1980); MGM/CBS Home Video, Inc. (1980–1982); MGM/UA Home Video, Inc. (1982–1998)
- Type: Division; Label
- Industry: Home video
- Founded: 1978; 48 years ago
- Fate: Physical media distribution currently handled by Alliance Entertainment. (See Past distribution deals)
- Headquarters: Santa Monica, California (1993–2005); Culver City, California, US
- Products: DVD; Blu-ray; Ultra HD Blu-ray
- Parent: Metro-Goldwyn-Mayer

MGM Home Entertainment LLC (also known as Metro-Goldwyn-Mayer Home Entertainment, Amazon MGM Studios Home Entertainment, d/b/a MGM Home Entertainment and formerly known as MGM Home Video, MGM/CBS Home Video and MGM/UA Home Video) is the home video distribution arm of the American media company Metro-Goldwyn-Mayer that was founded in 1978.

Their releases are currently distributed by Alliance Entertainment in North America, Spirit Entertainment in the United Kingdom and Ireland, All Interactive Distribution in Australia and New Zealand, Plaion Pictures in Germany, Austria, and Switzerland, and ESC Distribution in France and the Benelux since 2026.

== History ==
=== 1978–1982 ===
In 1978, the company was established as MGM Home Video, releasing MGM films and television series. On June 4, 1980, MGM announced that it joined forces with CBS Video Enterprises, the home video division of the CBS television network, and formed MGM/CBS Home Video. In October of that year, they released their first batch of Betamax and VHS tapes.

The initial printings of all 24 films were packaged in brown leather clamshell cases with gold lettering; they were presented to CBS executives. Later printings of these films, as well as all printings of later releases by MGM/CBS, were packaged in oversized gray book-style boxes with either the MGM Abstract Lion print logo or CBS Video print logo in the upper right hand corner of the packaging. MGM/CBS also issued some early tapes of Lorimar product; those releases would instead bear the Lorimar print logo where the MGM or CBS Video print logo would normally be.

In 1981, MGM/CBS and Samuel Goldwyn Home Entertainment began to co-market certain Goldwyn titles, with CBS Video Enterprises handling distribution on Goldwyn's behalf.

=== 1982–1998 ===
In 1982, a year after MGM bought and merged with the near-bankrupt United Artists (UA) from Transamerica, CBS dropped out of the video partnership with MGM and moved to 20th Century Fox to create CBS/Fox Video (Samuel Goldwyn titles moved to CBS/Fox, as they were distributed via CBS). MGM's video division became known as MGM/UA Home Entertainment Group, Inc., more commonly known as MGM/UA Home Video. MGM/UA continued to license pre-1981 UA and pre-1950 WB films (as well as some post-1981 titles) to CBS/Fox (due to an agreement UA had with Fox years earlier dating back to when CBS/Fox Video was called Magnetic Video). In 1982, the company entered into an agreement with The Cannon Group to release titles from the mini-major film studio through 1985. In 1985, it entered into an agreement with Rene Malo Video to handle Canadian distribution of MGM/UA product.

In 1986, MGM's pre-May 1986 library (also including the pre-1950 Warner Bros. library, Bugs Bunny: Superstar, the Fleischer Studios/Famous Studios Popeye cartoons, and most US rights to the RKO Pictures library), was acquired by Ted Turner and his company Turner Entertainment Co. (Note: Ted Turner served as former owner of MGM Entertainment Co. and founder of Turner Entertainment Co. from March 25, 1986 until his death on May 6, 2026.) After the library was acquired, MGM/UA signed a deal with Turner to continue distributing the pre-May 1986 MGM and to begin distributing the pre-1950 Warner Bros. libraries for video release (the rest of the library went to Turner Home Entertainment). Also that year, it signed an agreement with Roger Corman and his film studio Concorde Pictures that enabled MGM/UA worldwide access to motion pictures that were produced by Concorde. During Turner's short-lived ownership, Turner Broadcasting System launched an affiliated home video label, Turner Home Entertainment, which its titles was distributed by MGM/UA, but the distribution deal did not last long and THE was spun off into its own independent label.

In October 1990, after Pathé Communications bought MGM, MGM/UA Home Video struck a deal with Warner Home Video to have them distribute MGM/UA titles exclusively on home video worldwide. The Pathé merger also meant MGM acquired a majority of the Cannon Films library (certain rights for other media and select films during the Thorn EMI merger now lie with other entities with few exceptions), which was ironic considering MGM/UA had previously distributed Cannon output in the 1980s. MGM/UA also began distributing the rest of the UA library around this time after its contract with CBS/Fox ended. In 1994, MGM/UA Home Video launched the MGM/UA Family Entertainment label for family-friendly releases. In 1996, Warner Home Video made an exclusive deal with Image Entertainment to distribute MGM/UA titles on LaserDisc.

In 1997, MGM/UA, along with the other studios that were distributed by Warner Home Video, began releasing its titles on DVD. Some of the films MGM released on DVD were from the Turner catalog, which they were still allowed to keep after Turner merged into Time Warner Entertainment some time before because of their distribution deal. That same year, MGM acquired Orion Pictures. As a result, Orion Home Video (Orion's home video division) was absorbed by MGM/UA, and was retained as an in-name-only division until the acquisition deal was finalized in 1998. That year, the company was renamed MGM Home Entertainment.

=== 1998–2005 ===
Logo used from 1998 to 2020

After the Orion acquisition, MGM kept Orion Pictures intact as a corporation, mostly to avoid its video distribution agreement with Warner Home Video, and thus, Orion Pictures films would be distributed under the Orion Home Video label. In 1999, MGM acquired 2/3 of the pre-1996 PolyGram Filmed Entertainment library from Seagram for $250 million, increasing their library holdings to 4,000. The PolyGram libraries (which included the Epic film library) would be placed under Orion Pictures to avoid the Warner Home Video contract.

In March that same year, MGM paid $225 million to end its distribution contract with Warner Home Video, effectively ending their distribution problem; the initial deal was to have expired in 2003, but as a result of the early termination, it instead ended in February 2000. As a result of the deal, Warner Home Video took over the home media rights to the MGM/UA films owned by Turner.

Upon the expiration of the Warner Home Video deal, MGM signed a deal with 20th Century Fox Home Entertainment to distribute its films on home video overseas.

In 2001, MGM and Amazon.com launched the "MGM Movie Vault" to distribute VHS copies of selected films, either previously unreleased on video or long out-of-print, exclusively through Amazon.

On March 3, 2003, MGM Home Entertainment launched the MGM Kids sub-label. On May 27, MGM reinstated full distribution rights to their products in regions like the United Kingdom, Australia, Netherlands, Belgium, France, and Germany, although 20th Century Fox Home Entertainment continued to distribute for MGM in a majority of developing regions.

=== 2005–2019 ===
In 2005, following MGM's acquisition by a Sony-led consortium (in part so Sony could ensure MGM's support of the Sony-invented Blu-ray format), MGM stopped self-releasing their content and started releasing its newest content through Sony Pictures Home Entertainment under the standard MGM label. From that point onward, MGM releases began to be credited as Metro-Goldwyn-Mayer Studios, Inc., and the MGM Home Entertainment moniker would be retired within the same year. However, Sony failed to meet projected sales of MGM content on DVD (in part because the DVD market was cooling); further issues came when Harry Sloan was hired as MGM's chairman and split MGM from Sony Pictures control, instead championing MGM as a company independent of Sony. Continued strife between the companies and inside both plagued the deal, and MGM dropped Sony Pictures Home Entertainment as a home media distributor in late May 2006, instead signing a new worldwide distribution deal with 20th Century Fox Home Entertainment.

In 2010, parent company MGM Holdings emerged from bankruptcy. From 2011 to 2018, MGM no longer released or marketed their own movies, as they shared distribution with other studios that handle all distribution and marketing for MGM's projects. Since then, only a handful of MGM's most recent movies, such as Skyfall, the remake of Red Dawn, Carrie, RoboCop, If I Stay, Poltergeist (which Fox 2000 Pictures co-produced) and Spectre have been released on DVD and Blu-ray by its home video output via 20th Century Fox Home Entertainment. Others, such as The Hobbit trilogy, Hansel & Gretel: Witch Hunters, G.I. Joe: Retaliation, Hercules, Hot Tub Time Machine 2, Tomb Raider, Creed I and II, 21 and 22 Jump Street, Ben-Hur, Sherlock Gnomes and The Magnificent Seven have been released by the home video output of the co-distributor in these cases, Warner Bros. Home Entertainment (which would later handle MGM's home media titles from 2020 to 2026), Paramount Home Entertainment and Sony Pictures Home Entertainment respectively.

In 2011, MGM launched the "MGM Limited Edition Collection", a manufactured-on-demand (MOD) DVD service that issues unreleased and out-of-print titles from the MGM-owned library. Its releases are sold through the Warner Archive Collection.

On April 14, 2011, Fox's deal distributing the MGM library was extended through 2016. On June 27, 2016, Fox's distribution deal with MGM was further extended until June 30, 2020.

=== 2019–present ===
With the acquisition of Fox's parent company 21st Century Fox by the Walt Disney Company on March 20, 2019, MGM announced in their 2019 report that it would not renew its deal with Fox, and would search for a new distributor afterwards. In the studio's 2020 financial report, MGM named Warner Bros. Home Entertainment as their new home media distributor. However, the transfer does not include co-production films outside Warner Bros. as some MGM co-financed films are still owned by the respective co-distributors (including Walt Disney Pictures for the 2015 version of Poltergeist through 20th Century Studios and, respectively, Columbia Pictures for the 2016 remake of The Magnificent Seven). On May 26, 2021, it was officially announced that MGM would be acquired by Amazon for $8.45 billion, subject to regulatory approvals and other routine closing conditions; with MGM continuing to operate as a label under Amazon, but leaving the future of the physical home video releases of its titles other than its then-current distribution deal with Studio Distribution Services and several third-party boutique labels in question. The merger was finalized on March 17, 2022.

On January 12, 2026, MGM announced that their U.S. and Canadian physical media distribution would shift to Alliance Home Entertainment (no relation to the former Canadian company of the same name).

== Catalog and distribution deals ==
Currently, MGM's catalog is distributed by Alliance Entertainment in the United States and Canada and various independent companies overseas in addition to handling home media releases of its Manufacture-on-demand titles through Allied Vaughn. Previously, distribution was handled by Warner Bros. Home Entertainment through Studio Distribution Services, a joint venture between Warner Bros. and Universal from 2021 to 2025, that was first announced on January 14, 2020, later revealing the name on April 23, 2021, and marketed by Warner Bros., with them also handled distribution internationally from 2020 to 2026 and in Japan from 2020 to 2025. Warner Bros. already owns and distributes MGM's pre-May 1986 library (besides Electric Dreams as that was produced by Virgin and released through MGM/UA Entertainment Co. in the United States and Asia and 20th Century Fox elsewhere) through their ownership of Turner Entertainment Co., but the former began a distribution deal with the latter for its remaining catalog titles and select UAR releases when the latter left 20th Century Fox Home Entertainment – a prior distribution deal that began in 1999 – on June 30, 2020, and Universal distributed some of UAR's other releases beginning with Operation Finale on December 4, 2018, and ended with Licorice Pizza. MGM also licenses out some of its film and television library to Kino Lorber, the Criterion Collection, Shout! Studios, Vinegar Syndrome, Visual Entertainment Inc., Arrow Films, Severin Films, and formerly to Twilight Time, Olive Films and Sandpiper Pictures. HBO Max, Amazon Prime Video and MGM+ handle the worldwide streaming rights to MGM's pre-May 1986 and post-May 1986 libraries.

Many of Orion Pictures' films since its revival have been released through various third-party companies rather than through MGM/Fox. For example, the remake of The Town That Dreaded Sundown was released by Image Entertainment. However, MGM's distribution partners would release Orion's movies released through UAR.

=== Current distribution deals ===
- Alliance Entertainment (2026–present; North American distribution only)
- Allied Vaughn (Manufacture-on-demand releases only)
- Spirit Entertainment (2026–present; UK & Ireland distribution only)
- All Interactive Distribution (2026–present; Australia and New Zealand distribution only)
- Plaion Pictures (2026–present; Germany, Austria and Switzerland distribution only)
- ESC Distribution (2026–present; France and Benelux distribution only)

=== Past distribution deals ===
- 20th Century Fox Home Entertainment (1999–2005; internationally, 2006–2019; worldwide)
- Walt Disney Studios Home Entertainment (2019–2020; worldwide: as a result of Disney's acquisition of 20th Century Fox) (Note: Buena Vista Home Entertainment (which handled all physical media production and distribution for Disney's home entertainment assets until 2024 and in-house production of Buena Vista Home Entertainment continued until April 14, 2026 when Disney laid off its entire staff) existed as a legal name for Walt Disney Studios Home Entertainment from 2019 to 2024. Buena Vista Home Entertainment still exists and serves as a brand label for current releases.)
- Deuce Entertainment (2021–2022) (Dollar store DVD releases only)
- Sony Pictures Home Entertainment (2005–2006; worldwide)
- Studio Distribution Services (2021–2025; North American distribution only)
  - Universal Pictures Home Entertainment (2018–2021; worldwide, 2021–2022; internationally)
  - Warner Bros. Home Entertainment (1990–1999, 2020–2025)
