= Beetlejuice (TV series) =

American animated TV series (1989–1991)

- Genre: Fantasy comedy
- Based on: Beetlejuice by: Michael McDowell; Larry Wilson
- Developed by: Tim Burton
- Written by: Patsy Cameron; Tedd Anasti
- Directed by: Robin Budd (seasons 1–2); John van Bruggen (seasons 3–4); Larry Jacobs (seasons 3–4); John Halfpenny (seasons 3–4); Rick Marshall (season 4); Alan Bunce (season 4)
- Voices of: Stephen Ouimette; Alyson Court; Elizabeth Hanna; Roger Dunn; Harvey Atkin; Tara Charendoff; Len Carlson; Paulina Gillis
- Theme music composer: Danny Elfman (adapted from the score of the film)
- Opening theme: "Beetlejuice Title Theme"
- Ending theme: "Beetlejuice Ending Theme" by Danny Elfman
- Composer: Tom Szczesniak
- Countries of origin: United States; Canada
- Original language: English
- No. of seasons: 4
- No. of episodes: 94 (109 segments) (list of episodes)

Production
- Executive producers: Tim Burton; David Geffen
- Producers: Michael Hirsh; Patrick Loubert; Clive A. Smith; Seasons 2–4: Tedd Anasti; Patsy Cameron
- Running time: 22 minutes
- Production companies: Tim Burton Enterprises Inc.; Nelvana Limited; Warner Bros. Television; The Geffen Film Company

Original release
- Network: ABC
- Release: September 9, 1989 – October 26, 1991
- Network: Fox Kids
- Release: September 9 – December 6, 1991

Beetlejuice is a Canadian-American animated television series that ran from September 9, 1989, to October 26, 1991, on ABC, and on Fox Kids from September 9 to December 6, 1991. Loosely based on the 1988 American film of the same name, it was developed by its director, Tim Burton, who also served as an executive producer. The series follows Lydia Deetz and her friend Beetlejuice and their adventures in the "mortal world" and the Neitherworld, a supernatural realm inhabited by various monsters. Danny Elfman, who composed the theme for the film, also arranged it for the series.

== Plot ==
The series follows the adventures of ghostly con-man Beetlejuice and his best friend Lydia Deetz in the Neitherworld and the "mortal world", the New England town of Peaceful Pines. As in the film, Lydia could summon Beetlejuice from the Neitherworld or go there by calling his name three times. The series' humor relied heavily on sight gags, wordplay, and allusiveness. Many episodes, notably towards the end of the series' run, were parodies of movies, books, and TV shows.

== Characters ==
=== Main ===
- Beetlejuice (voiced by Stephen Ouimette) is the series' central character, adapted from the 1988 film. In the show, he is still a mischievous prankster, but his personality is toned down compared to the film, making him less crude and more sympathetic. He retains a wide range of magical abilities, most notably shapeshifting, conjuring objects, and teleportation, which are often used for comic effect. Unlike the film version, he is depicted as Lydia's best friend rather than an antagonist. Much of the comedy revolves around his wordplay, as figures of speech spoken by him can become literal. Beetlejuice frequently attempts money-making schemes or elaborate pranks, though his antics are usually more playful than harmful.
- Lydia Deetz (voiced by Alyson Court) is a gothic preteen and Beetlejuice's closest friend. She is imaginative, intelligent, and more mature than her peers, though she often struggles to fit in at school. Lydia has interests in art, photography, literature, and the macabre, which make her an outsider among her classmates but well accepted in the Neitherworld. She can summon Beetlejuice or travel to his realm by calling his name three times. Through their friendship, Beetlejuice encourages Lydia's confidence and individuality, while she often acts as his moral compass.

=== Supporting ===
==== Peaceful Pines inhabitants ====
- Charles Deetz (voiced by Roger Dunn) is Lydia's father. He is mild-mannered, enjoys hobbies such as birdwatching and baseball, and is frequently the target of Beetlejuice's pranks, though Beetlejuice also shows a certain fondness for him.
- Delia Deetz (voiced by Elizabeth Hanna) is Lydia's eccentric stepmother. A self-proclaimed artist and cook, her unusual creations are not always appreciated in the human world but are popular in the Neitherworld. Her offbeat personality makes her less easily frightened than Charles.

Lydia's school friends include Bertha (voiced by Tara Charendoff), who shares her interest in the unusual, and Prudence (voiced by Paulina Gillis), who is shy and bookish. Her main school rival is Claire Brewster (voiced by Tara Charendoff), a spoiled and self-centered classmate who frequently clashes with Lydia and becomes another target of Beetlejuice's tricks.

==== Neitherworld inhabitants ====
The Neitherworld features a recurring cast of residents. Jacques LaLean (voiced by Charles Kerr) is a French skeleton and aspiring bodybuilder, often exasperated by Beetlejuice but still considered his friend. Ginger (voiced by Paulina Gillis) is a tap-dancing spider with show business ambitions. The Monster Across the Street (voiced by Len Carlson) resembles a hairy giant and regularly expresses frustration at Beetlejuice's antics.

Other recurring characters include Mayor Maynot (voiced by Len Carlson), the temperamental leader of the Neitherworld; his assistant I. M. Smallhead; Judge Mental, who presides over legal matters; and Mr. Monitor, who operates the local television network. Beetlejuice's family, introduced in the series, includes his parents Gnat and Bea Juice. Beetlejuice also has a brother named Donny Juice, that looks strikingly similar to him, but has a much cleaner appearance, a different haircut, and straight, white teeth.

The show also features unusual creatures such as Doomie, a sentient car that occasionally transforms into a monster called the Dragster of Doom, and the Sandworms, feared serpentine creatures that inhabit Sandwormland beneath the Neitherworld.

== Episodes ==
Season	Episodes	Originally released		
Season	Episodes	First released	Last released	Network
1	13	September 9, 1989	December 9, 1989	ABC
2	8	September 8, 1990	October 27, 1990	ABC
3	8	September 7, 1991	October 26, 1991	ABC
4	65	September 9, 1991	December 6, 1991	Fox Kids

== Voice cast ==
- Stephen Ouimette – Beetlejuice, Snugglejuice, Posijuice, Negajuice
- Alyson Court – Lydia Deetz
- Elizabeth Hanna – Delia Deetz, Miss Shannon
- Roger Dunn – Charles Deetz
- Harvey Atkin – Lipscum, Exorcist
- Tara Charendoff – Bertha, Claire Brewster, Little Miss Warden
- Len Carlson – The Monster Across the Street, Judge Mental, Barf Birfman, Mayor Maynot, Mr. Juice, Uncle Clyde, Messy Jesse, Foreman, Hopalong Casualty, Poopsie
- Paulina Gillis – Prudence, Ginger
- Keith Knight – Barry MeNot, Flubbo, Armhold Musclehugger, Chester Slime, Dr. Zigmund Void
- Ron Rubin – Germs Pondscum, Doombuggy
- Colin Fox – Dragster of Doom
- Keith Hampshire – Doomie
- Joseph Sherman – Scuzzo the Clown
- David Goldberg – Fuzzo the Clown
- Stuart Stone – Ramon
- Dan Hennessey – Jesse Germs, Captain Kidder, Bully the Crud
- Peggy Mahon – Mrs. Bugsley, Aunt May
- Susan Roman – Miss Shapen, Percy, Poopette, the Monstress Across the Street, Mrs. Juice
- Richard Binsley – Donnyjuice, Wyatt Burp
- Don Francks – Count Mein, Mr. Big
- Michael Stark – Fleagor
- Charles Kerr – Jacques
- Allan Stewart Coates – Ed
- John Stocker – Mr. Monitor, Bartholomew Batt
- Hadley Kay – Prince Vince

== Production ==
Following the major critical and commercial success of the Beetlejuice film in early 1988, it led to an animated spin-off series being created by Warner Bros. Television. The production was provided by the Canadian Nelvana Ltd., The Geffen Film Company and Tim Burton, Inc. The series premiered on September 9, 1989, on ABC.

The animated series was a mega breakout hit for ABC in its initial seasons, and later became one of the first cartoon animated series to ever air on Fox's weekday afternoons children's lineup, though also remaining on ABC's Saturday morning schedules, making it one of the first animated shows to air concurrently on two different U.S. broadcast networks.

The premise of the animated series differs in a number of ways from the original film in order to be acceptable for children. In the TV series, he and Lydia are best friends, Beetlejuice is made out to be more of a prankster, and Lydia is given a much quirkier, but positive demeanor. Lydia often travels to the "Neitherworld" (changed from "Afterlife") to have adventures with Beetlejuice. These adventures could involve fun activities together, Lydia saving Beetlejuice from a bad situation, or scolding him for a money-making scam.

== Merchandise ==
Much as with the original 1988 film, various merchandise was released for the Beetlejuice animated series in 1990. This included trading cards by Dart, a sticker album and sticker/activity book by Panini, a jigsaw puzzle by Golden, a coloring book, novels, a lunchbox and thermos set, Valentines, a party centerpiece by Party Creations, a PC game by Hi Tech Expressions, a Game Boy game by Rare, and six PVC figures available with Burger King Kids' Meals. Kenner, the company behind the film's action figures, had begun developing figures for the animated series, but the project did not come to fruition (at least one prototype for that ill-fated collection has been showcased online). Vinyl figures of Beetlejuice and Lydia were released by CultureFly in 2024, making it the first licensed merchandise released in over thirty years.

=== Home media ===
Warner Bros. released most of the first season of the show on six video-cassettes by December 21, 1993. In September 2008, three episodes ("A-Ha!", "Skeletons in the Closet", and "Spooky Boo-tique") were released as bonus features on the film's 20th Anniversary Deluxe Edition DVD.

In 2012, Time Life (under Warner Home Video license) acquired the rights to the series and planned to release it on DVD for the following year. Shout! Factory released Beetlejuice – The Complete Series on DVD in Region 1 as an Amazon exclusive on May 28, 2013. They also released Season 1 on the same day to retail stores. Seasons 2 & 3 were released on March 18, 2014. On June 25, 2024, Warner Bros. Home Entertainment (through Studio Distribution Services) re-issued the complete series on a DVD box set in Region 1, to coincide with the theatrical release of Beetlejuice Beetlejuice later that same year. Around the same time, the series was made available as transactional video on demand purchases through streaming retailers including Amazon Prime Video and the iTunes Store.

Beetlejuice home video releases
Season		Episodes	Release dates
Season		Episodes	Region 1
1	1989	13	Volume 1 (VHS only): December 21, 1993; Episodes: "Critter Sitters" – "Skeletons in the Closet" Volume 2 (VHS only): December 21, 1993; Episodes: "A Dandy Handy Man" / "Out of My Mind" • "Worm Welcome" Volume 3 (VHS only): December 21, 1993; Episodes: "Stage Fright" / "Spooky Tree" • "Pest O' the West" Volume 4 (VHS only): December 21, 1993; Episodes: "Laugh of the Party" • "Campfire Ghouls" Volume 5 (VHS only): December 21, 1993; Episodes: "It's the Pits" • "Prince of the Neitherworld" Volume 6 (VHS only): December 21, 1993; Episodes: "Bad Neighbor Beetlejuice" • "Quit While You're a Head" Beetlejuice: 20th Anniversary Deluxe Edition: September 16, 2008; Episodes: "Skeletons in the Closet" The Complete First Season: May 28, 2013 The Complete Series: August 20, 2013 (Shout! Factory) A Halloween Spooktacular: October 1, 2013; Episodes: "Laugh of the Party" The Complete Series: June 25, 2024 (Warner Bros. Home Entertainment/Studio Distribution Services)
2	1990	8	Beetlejuice: 20th Anniversary Deluxe Edition: September 16, 2008; Episodes: "Spooky Boo-tique" • "A-Ha!" The Complete Series: August 20, 2013 (Shout! Factory) A Halloween Spooktacular: October 1, 2013; Episodes: "Scare and Scare Alike" / "Spooky Boo-tique" • "Bewitched, Bothered & Beetlejuiced" The Complete Second and Third Seasons: March 18, 2014" The Complete Series: June 25, 2024 (Warner Bros. Home Entertainment/Studio Distribution Services)
3	1991	8	The Complete Series: August 20, 2013 (Shout! Factory) A Halloween Spooktacular: October 1, 2013; Episodes: "Ghost to Ghost" The Complete Second and Third Seasons: March 18, 2014 The Complete Series: June 25, 2024 (Warner Bros. Home Entertainment/Studio Distribution Services)
4	1991	65	The Complete Series: August 20, 2013 (Shout! Factory) A Halloween Spooktacular: October 1, 2013; Episodes: "Raging Skull" • "Family Scarelooms" • "Them Bones, Them Bones, Them Funny Bones" • "Ship of Ghouls" The Complete Series: June 25, 2024 (Warner Bros. Home Entertainment/Studio Distribution Services)

== Awards ==
Daytime Emmy Awards

- 1990 – Outstanding Animated Program (Won) (tied with The New Adventures of Winnie the Pooh)
