= Eddie Murphy discography =

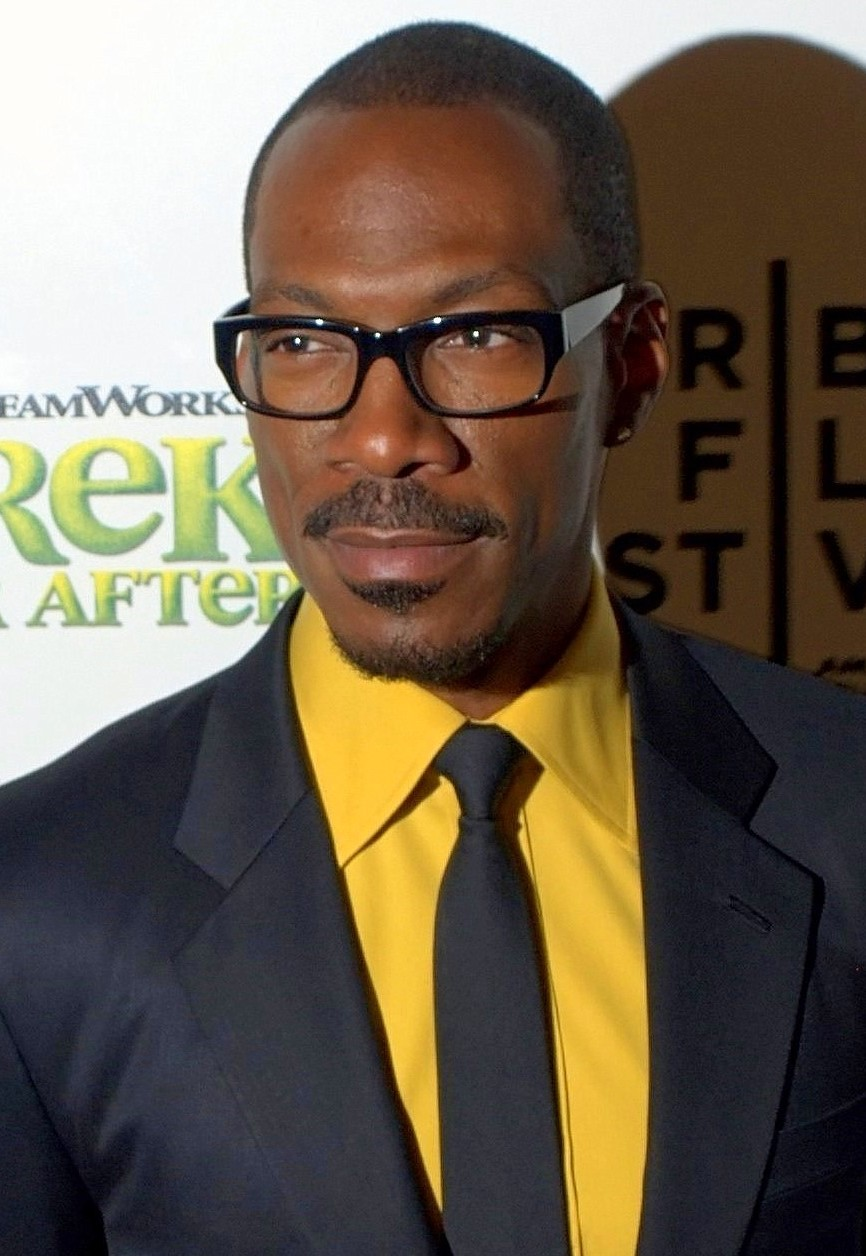
Eddie Murphy at Tribeca Film Festival 2010

Eddie Murphy is an American actor, comedian, singer, producer and screenwriter. The following is his complete discography.

== Albums ==
=== Studio albums ===
Year	Album details	Peak chart positions			Certifications
Year	Album details	US	US R&B	AUS	Certifications
1985	How Could It Be: Release date: September 1985; Label: Columbia	26	17	—	RIAA: Gold
1989	So Happy: Release date: August 1989; Label: Columbia	70	22	—	
1993	Love's Alright: Release date: February 23, 1993; Label: Motown	—	80	—	
"—" denotes releases that did not chart

=== Live comedy albums ===
Year	Album details	Peak chart positions			Certifications
Year	Album details	US	US R&B	AUS	Certifications
1982	Eddie Murphy: Release date: November 6, 1982; Label: Columbia	52	26	—	RIAA: Platinum
1983	Comedian: Release date: October 24, 1983; Label: Columbia	35	10	94	RIAA: 2× Platinum

=== Compilation albums ===
Year	Album details
1997	Greatest Comedy Hits: Release date: May 27, 1997; Label: Columbia
1998	All I Fuckin' Know: Release date: April 28, 1998; Label: Sony BMG

== Singles ==
Year	Single	Peak chart positions						Certifications	Album
Year	Single	US	US R&B	US Dance	AUS	NZ	UK	Certifications	Album
1982	"Boogie in Your Butt"	—	56	—	—	—	—		Eddie Murphy
1985	"Party All the Time"	2	8	19	21	3	87	RIAA: Platinum	How Could It Be
1985	"How Could It Be" (with Crystal Blake)	—	63	—	—	—	—		How Could It Be
1989	"Put Your Mouth on Me"	27	2	—	—	—	—		So Happy
1989	"Til the Money's Gone"	—	75	—	—	—	—		So Happy
1993	"I Was a King"	—	61	—	141	—	64		Love's Alright
1993	"Whatzupwitu" (with Michael Jackson)	—	74	—	88	—	—		Love's Alright
1993	"Desdamona"	—	43	—	—	—	—		Love's Alright
2013	"Red Light" (with Snoop Lion)	—	—	—	—	—	—		Non-album single
2013	"Promise (You Won't Break My Heart)"	—	—	—	—	—	—		Non-album single
2014	"Temporary"	—	—	—	—	—	—		Non-album single
2015	"Oh Jah Jah"	—	—	—	—	—	—		Non-album single
"—" denotes releases that did not chart
