= Eddie Murphy Delirious =

1983 stand-up comedy television special starring Eddie Murphy

- Genre: Stand-up comedy
- Written by: Eddie Murphy
- Directed by: Bruce Gowers
- Starring: Eddie Murphy
- Country of origin: United States
- Original language: English

Production
- Producers: Eddie Murphy; Robert Wachs; Richard Tienken
- Cinematography: Juan Barrera; Grek Cook; Sam Drummy; Les Leibowitz; Mike Lieberman; Jake Ostroff; Ken Patterson; Joel Gold
- Editors: Ken Denisoff; Dave Barr
- Running time: 69 minutes
- Production company: Eddie Murphy Productions

Original release
- Network: HBO
- Release: October 15, 1983

Eddie Murphy Delirious is an American stand-up comedy television special directed by Bruce Gowers, written by and starring Eddie Murphy. The stand-up set became a TV Special for HBO on October 15, 1983. The 70-minute special was Murphy's first feature stand-up and the predecessor to the wide theatrical release in 1987, Eddie Murphy Raw. Delirious was also released as an album on October 24, 1983, titled Eddie Murphy: Comedian, which won Best Comedy Album at the 1984 Grammy Awards.

== Overview ==
Unlike his acts on Saturday Night Live, Murphy's performance was very profane, saying the word fuck a total of 230 times, and shit 171 times. The show was recorded at DAR Constitution Hall in Washington, D.C. on August 17–18, 1983.

Before the show started, The BusBoys performed "(The Boys Are) Back in Town" over a montage of pre-show footage of Murphy traveling with his road crew. After this concludes, Murphy is introduced, thanks The BusBoys for their opening performance, and commences his own.

Among the topics Murphy addresses is the lure ice cream trucks have on children. Once the ice cream was bought, they would sing and dance mockingly in front of kids who could not afford it. The phrase "The Ice Cream Man is coming!" from this segment was sampled by rapper Raekwon on the 1995 single "Ice Cream". Other topics that he addresses are family parties (his cookout skit featuring a humanoid cryptid for an aunt-in-law and an uncle who ignites the whole backyard in an attempt to work the grill) parental discipline (his shoe-throwing mothers monologue), Michael Jackson, James Brown, Stevie Wonder, Mick Jagger, racism, Reaganomics, gay people (including a routine depicting "The Honeymooners" Ralph Kramden and Ed Norton as same-sex sweethearts), AIDS, and Marian Anderson. After his routine, the video ends with Murphy and his road crew walking to his dressing room while the credits roll.

== Reception ==
The special received positive reviews and is widely cited by comedians as a seminal stand-up work. The review aggregation website Rotten Tomatoes gave it an 83% approval rating based on 6 reviews. However, it was criticized for being anti-gay.

"When I did Delirious," Murphy reflected in 1989, "I got all this flak for my material being so filthy. The truth is, it's nowhere near as filthy as some of the stuff they're doing now. I'm feeling like a fucking old guy watching Sam Kinison or Andrew Dice Clay."

One of the topics that Murphy addresses in Delirious is homosexuality, and using the homophobic slur "faggot". However, in 1996, he released a one-page statement apologizing for his use of that slur, saying: "I deeply regret any pain all this has caused."

== Home video ==
In June 2009, a 25th Anniversary Edition was released.
