= List of Beetlejuice episodes =

The following is a list of episodes from the animated television series Beetlejuice which aired on ABC from 1989 to 1991. The first season consists of 13 episodes. The second and third seasons each consist of 8 episodes. The fourth and final season consists of 65 episodes. The series premiered on September 9, 1989 and ended on December 6, 1991.

Shout! Factory released the entire series on DVD in region 1 on May 20, 2013. The series was re-issued on DVD in region 1 by Warner Bros. Home Entertainment (through Studio Distribution Services) on June 25, 2024. Currently, the complete series is streaming on Tubi.

== Series overview ==
| Season | Episodes | Originally released | | |
| Season | Episodes | First released | Last released | Network |
|---|---|---|---|---|
| 1 | 13 | September 9, 1989 | December 9, 1989 | ABC |
| 2 | 8 | September 8, 1990 | October 27, 1990 | ABC |
| 3 | 8 | September 7, 1991 | October 26, 1991 | ABC |
| 4 | 65 | September 9, 1991 | December 6, 1991 | Fox Kids |

== Episodes ==
=== Season 1 (1989) ===
| No. | Title | Written by | Original release date |
|---|---|---|---|
| 1 | "Critter Sitters" | Patsy Cameron & Tedd Anasti | September 9, 1989 |
Beetlejuice gets a job babysitting to buy Lydia a present, but Neitherworld babies are a bit more of a handful than Outerworld ones and BJ gets dragged before Judge Mental for a long string of offenses. Note: This is the pilot episode of the series and Beetlejuice breaks the fourth wall at the beginning of the episode by asking the viewers for money, in addition to providing backstory on how he and Lydia met.
| 2a | "The Big Face Off" | Peter Sauder | September 16, 1989 |
Beetlejuice and Lydia compete against the reigning King and Queen of Gross on a popular Neitherworld TV show.
| 2b | "Skeletons in the Closet" | Patsy Cameron and Tedd Anasti | September 16, 1989 |
The skeletons in BJ's closet have accumulated so much over the years that the closet finally bursts.
| 3b | "A Dandy Handy Man" | Peter Sauder | September 23, 1989 |
Lydia is getting ready for the big photo show, but she can't decide which of her pictures is the best. Beetlejuice loves all of her work, and decides he wants to buy whichever photo she picks, but he doesn't have any money.
| 3a | "Out of My Mind" | Therese Naugle | September 23, 1989 |
BJ and Lydia have a fight after Beetlejuice gets her in trouble for pulling a prank on her parents involving Delia's world-famous spaghetti. Lydia banishes the ghost to the Neitherworld. Beetlejuice foolishly makes the comment that he can't get Lydia out of his mind and accidentally teleports her there, where Lydia meets up with BJ's wimpy Will Power and overbearing Prankenstein.
| 4a | "Stage Fright" | Doug Molitor | September 30, 1989 |
Miss Shannon's School is putting on a school play known as Romeo and Juliet, and Lydia tries out for the part of Juliet. Claire wants it too, and sabotages Lydia's audition to get the role. For revenge, Lydia becomes the costume designer, and designs a costume she knows Claire will hate, but BJ's got other plans for revenge.
| 4b | "Spooky Tree" | Mike Keyes | September 30, 1989 |
Lydia's favorite tree, Spooky, is slated to be cut down so the road can be widened. Beetlejuice, in a fit of generosity, grants Spooky with the gift of locomotion, allowing the tree to run rampant through the town.
| 5 | "Laugh of the Party" | Patsy Cameron and Tedd Anasti | October 7, 1989 |
It's Halloween, and Claire's throwing the biggest Halloween bash in Peaceful Pines until Lydia announces that she, too, will throw a party. There are a few problems: 1) all she has to wear is a cute pink bunny costume after Delia gets involved; 2) there will be no food or decorations; and 3) no one is coming. Beetlejuice goes to solve the problem, posing himself as Mr. Beetleman, who introduces Peaceful Pines to "Party People in a Can".
| 6 | "Worm Welcome" | Tony Marino | October 14, 1989 |
Beetlejuice has a run-in with a newly hatched Sandworm, and Lydia accidentally calls him out of the Neitherworld while he's in contact with it, so they both teleport to the Outerworld.
| 7a | "Bad Neighbor Beetlejuice" | Therese Naugle | October 21, 1989 |
BJ's neighbors kick him out, so he tries to be a "good neighbor", but BJ's idea of a good neighbor isn't quite the same one his friends have.
| 7b | "Campfire Ghouls" | Tony Marino | October 21, 1989 |
Beetlejuice (disguised as Betty Juice), Lydia, Bertha and Prudence go camping in the Neitherwoods.
| 8 | "Pest O' the West" | J.D. Smith | October 28, 1989 |
BJ takes Lydia on a trip to a Neitherworld Wild West town, where the locals promptly make Beetlejuice their new sheriff. He immediately runs afoul of the local terror, Bully the Crud, who takes an uncomfortable shine to Lydia.
| 9a | "Bizarre Bazaar" | Doug Molitor | November 4, 1989 |
Miss Shannon teams up Lydia and Claire to run this year's haunted house at the school bazaar. Lydia's got some good and scary ideas, but Claire's got other plans and ruins everything. BJ responds by ruining things right back.
| 9b | "Pat on the Back" | Tony Marino | November 4, 1989 |
BJ says he deserves a "pat on the back" and he gets one, in the form of a weird little guy with an Irish accent who actually grows out of his back.
| 10a | "Poopsie" | Dan Distefano | November 11, 1989 |
The Monster Across the Street is going to a Monster Across the Street convention and he leaves Poopsie in Beetlejuice's care for the day.
| 10b | "It's the Pits" | Evelyn A.R. Gabai | November 11, 1989 |
Beetlejuice gets famous for using his armpit farts as a musical instrument, but fame isn't the life for the Ghost with the Most, especially when Beetlejuice throws his friends out in the cold.
| 11 | "Prince of the Neitherworld" | Therese Naugle | November 18, 1989 |
Neitherworld royalty Prince Vince falls in love with Lydia, and asks BJ for some help in winning her heart. BJ is initially eager to assist, in exchange for being named the prince's personal court jester, but finds that he's not happy about having to share Lydia's time and attention.
| 12 | "Quit While You're a Head" | J.D. Smith | December 2, 1989 |
Beetlejuice's head is kidnapped by headhunters.
| 13a | "Cousin B.J." | Pamela Hickey and Dennys McCoy | December 9, 1989 |
Lydia's Aunt Zipporah, Uncle Danforth, Aunt May, and Uncle Clyde come for a visit. In order to participate in the gathering, Beetlejuice disguises himself as Lydia's "cousin B.J."
| 13b | "Beetlejuice's Parents" | Patsy Cameron, Tedd Anasti and Janis Diamond | December 9, 1989 |
Lydia and BJ go to see the latter's parents. His mother is a neat freak and his father is a workaholic.

=== Season 2 (1990) ===
The second and third seasons each include eight episodes, which makes them the shortest seasons to air.

| No. overall | No. in season | Title | Written by | Original release date |
|---|---|---|---|---|
| 14 | 1 | "Dragster of Doom" | Patsy Cameron and Tedd Anasti | September 8, 1990 |
Beetlejuice and Lydia decide that it's time for them to have a car of their own, so they rebuild a salvaged one they find in a Neitherworld wrecking yard. BJ however delivers Lydia an abnormal carburetor for installation and although the car they create looks normal at first, it soon becomes evident that he's abnormal.
| 15a | 2a | "Scare and Scare Alike" | Tony Marino | September 15, 1990 |
It's Scary Fool's Day in the Neitherworld and BJ and Lydia are trying to outdo each other, but a sandworm appears to ruin the festivities.
| 15b | 2b | "Spooky Boo-tique" | Tony Marino | September 15, 1990 |
Lydia's creepy fashions gain the girls a spot in the Peaceful Pines Mondo Mall, but no one's interested and Mr. Beetleman sends a message over the airwaves.
| 16 | 3 | "Driven Crazy" | Doug Molitor | September 22, 1990 |
Beetlejuice, Lydia and Doomie enter the Neitherworld Groan Prix, where they face possible defeat by Scuzzo and Fuzzo.
| 17 | 4 | "Scummer Vacation" | Evelyn A-R Gabai | September 29, 1990 |
Lydia's parents want to go on a vacation, so Beetlejuice, posing as Mr. Beetleman, offers his services as a tour guide in the Neitherworld so that he and Lydia can spend the summer together.
| 18 | 5 | "Bewitched, Bothered & Beetlejuiced" | Therese Naugle | October 6, 1990 |
It's Halloween again, and Lydia is spending the night in the Neitherworld, but Percy tags along and gets catnapped by a witch and taken to the Witches' Ball. Beetlejuice and Lydia must masquerade as witches to sneak in and get Percy back.
| 19a | 6a | "Dr. Beetle & Mr. Juice" | John Halfpenny | October 13, 1990 |
Beetlejuice invents a cologne that changes the personality of anyone it comes in contact with into its polar opposite. When Lydia gets sprayed with it, she becomes a wild, prank-pulling criminal and, taking Beetlejuice along for the ride, wreaks more havoc on the Neitherworld than BJ's ever been responsible for.
| 19b | 6b | "Running Scared" | Tony Marino | October 13, 1990 |
Beetlejuice (as Betty Juice) runs for class president against Claire as Lydia watches helplessly, but both campaigns are hopelessly overdone.
| 20a | 7a | "The Really Odd Couple" | Tony Marino | October 20, 1990 |
When Beetlejuice blows up the Monster Across the Street's house, he is obligated to take the Monster and Poopsie in or Jacques and Ginger will rat him out. Desperate to rid himself of his unwanted roommates, BJ even tries rebuilding the Monster's house for him, only to find out that the Monster likes the Roadhouse.
| 20b | 7b | "A-Ha!" | J.D. Smith | October 20, 1990 |
Doomie disappears and BJ becomes the famed Neitherworld detective Sherlock Homely in order to track him down.
| 21a | 8a | "Uncle B.J.'s Roadhouse" | Alan Bunce | October 27, 1990 |
Beetlejuice hosts a morbid Pee-wee's Playhouse-esque children's show.
| 21b | 8b | "Scarecrow" | Julianne Klemm | October 27, 1990 |
Beetlejuice takes a job as a scarecrow at a beetle farm.
| 21c | 8c | "The Son Dad Never Had" | Therese Naugle | October 27, 1990 |
When Lydia is too busy to spend time with Charles, Beetlejuice seeing a scam steps in as Cousin BJ and cons Charles into spending time with (and money on) him.

=== Season 3 (1991) ===
NOTE: This season is the final season to air on ABC. Next season (season 4) would be the first and only season to air on FOX.

| No. overall | No. in season | Title | Written by | Original release date |
|---|---|---|---|---|
| 22 | 1 | "Mom's Best Friend" | Tony Marino | September 7, 1991 |
When Beetlejuice is collared while in dog form, he gets stuck that way. Lydia calls him to the Outerworld where Delia promptly adopts him as the dog she always wanted even though Charles is allergic to dogs.
| 23 | 2 | "Back to School Ghoul" | Patsy Cameron, Tedd Anasti and Doug Molitor | September 14, 1991 |
Beetlejuice's license to drive people crazy is revoked, as he didn't finish Kindergarten. Lydia must help him graduate from Kindergarten and win his license back.
| 24 | 3 | "Doomie's Romance" | Therese Naugle | September 21, 1991 |
Doomie falls in love with the Mayor's pink car, which Doomie dubs Pinky. The down side is, Pinky isn't alive like Doomie. What's worse, both Beetlejuice and Mayor Maynot are adamantly against the relationship.
| 25 | 4 | "Ghost to Ghost" | Evelyn A-R Gabai | September 28, 1991 |
Delia holds a séance and summons Lydia's favorite deceased actor, Boris Todeoff. Although Lydia is thrilled by the visit, a jealous BJ is less than ecstatic. When Boris reveals his evil plan to kick the Deetzes out of their home, Lydia has to change her opinion, and quick. Note: Boris's last name, Todeoff, is pronounced "to death".
| 26a | 5a | "Spitting Image" | Alan Willert | October 5, 1991 |
When BJ gets split while in amoebae form, Lydia suddenly finds herself in double the weirdness as usual. It just goes to prove that no one can get along with Beetlejuice, not even himself.
| 26b | 5b | "Awards to the Wise" | Evelyn A-R Gabai | October 5, 1991 |
When people all around him start winning trivial awards, Beetlejuice decides that he wants one, too.
| 27 | 6 | "The Prince of Rock and Roll" | Therese Naugle | October 12, 1991 |
Prince Vince wishes that his subjects would love him, so he decides to be a rock and roll star, but his music is so depressing everyone hates it. In order to spare his feelings, Lydia convinces the people to pretend that they enjoy it. As an unfortunate result, Prince Vince is on perpetual tour. With the entire Neitherworld depressed beyond hope, it may be time for Lydia to tell Vince the truth.
| 28a | 7a | "A Ghoul and His Money" | Alan Willert | October 19, 1991 |
Beetlejuice wins a whole lot of money under one condition: he can't juice anyone again or the cash gets revoked. The situation is embraced warmly by the Neitherworld's stinking rich (who stink in more ways than BJ does).
| 28b | 7b | "Brides of Funkenstein" | Evelyn A-R Gabai, Patsy Cameron and Tedd Anasti | October 19, 1991 |
It's the Battle of the Bands: Lydia's band, The Brides of Funkenstein, and Claire's band, The Clairenettes. Each of them wants to perform at the annual girls'/boys' school mixer. Note: The episode was based on an idea submitted by a teenage girl who was a fan of the show.
| 29a | 8a | "Beetledude" | Therese Naugle | October 26, 1991 |
The Deetzes get new neighbors, and the new kid on the block, Ramon, wants to be just like Mr. Beetleman, but it's a lot harder to get out of trouble after grossing people out when you don't have magic, so Lydia is forced to instruct BJ to "de-Beetlejuice" Ramon.
| 29b | 8b | "The Farmer in the Smell" | John Antoniou, Tom Johnstone and Kathleen Naugle | October 26, 1991 |
Lydia heads off to Aunt May and Uncle Clyde's farm, and Beetlejuice tags along as Mr. Beetleman. When May and Clyde give all the work to BJ, Beetlejuice has a problem to get any fun activity.

=== Season 4 (1991) ===
The fourth and final season includes sixty-five episodes and was the only season to air on the FOX Network as part of its Fox Kids block.
Note: Lydia is absent from the episodes "You're History", "Sore Feet", "The Miss Beauty-Juice Pageant", "Ghoul of My Dreams", "Don't Beetlejuice and Drive" and "Catmandu Got Your Tongue".
Note: This is the only season in which every episode is normal length.

| No. overall | No. in season | Title | Written by | Original release date |
|---|---|---|---|---|
| 30 | 1 | "You're History" | Doug Molitor | September 9, 1991 |
Beetlejuice gets a bunch of famous dead historical figures to appear on Neitherworld TV. NOTE: Lydia doesn't appear in this episode.
| 31 | 2 | "Raging Skull" | Therese Naugle and Burt Wetanson | September 10, 1991 |
Jacques tries to achieve his dream of becoming Mr. Neitherworld, with one obstacle: Armhold Musclehugger, the current reigning King of Fitness.
| 32 | 3 | "Sore Feet" | Patsy Cameron and Tedd Anasti | September 11, 1991 |
Beetlejuice's feet decide they aren't being treated right and strike out on their own. BJ must find them before they get themselves in trouble. NOTE: Lydia doesn't appear in this episode.
| 33 | 4 | "Fast Food" | Tony Marino | September 12, 1991 |
It's BJ and Lydia's Frankenburgers vs. Scuzzo's Clown Burgers in the biggest fast food fight of the century.
| 34 | 5 | "Queasy Rider" | Evelyn A-R Gabai | September 13, 1991 |
Beetlejuice gets tired of Doomie's tendency to be nice, so he builds a new vehicle: Road Hawg, the meanest chopper around. When Road Hawg forms a vicious new gang, Doomie's the only one who can save BJ.
| 35 | 6 | "How Green Is My Gallery" | Chris Hubbell and Sam Graham | September 16, 1991 |
Delia's art is a flop in Peaceful Pines, so Lydia and BJ decide to take Delia to a Neitherworld art colony, where her art will be truly appreciated, but with the good comes the bad.
| 36 | 7 | "Keeping Up with the Boneses" | Eric Lewald | September 17, 1991 |
When new rich neighbors move in and show off, Beetlejuice goes out and gets himself a Monster Charge Card so he can have a bigger house and more stuff. When the repo men arrive, BJ has to make a tough choice.
| 37 | 8 | "Pranks for the Memories" | Therese Naugle | September 18, 1991 |
Scuzzo's got BJ's brain, BJ's got no brain, and it's out to rule the Neitherworld.
| 38 | 9 | "Caddy Shock" | Julianne Klemm | September 19, 1991 |
Lydia is stuck competing against Claire in her school's golf course and Claire just happens to be the reigning teen golf champ of Peaceful Pines. In an attempt to help Lydia out, BJ teleports Claire to a Neitherworld country club, where she is turned into a golf trophy. Beetlejuice and Lydia have to win the golf tournament and get Claire back. Title Reference: The title is a play on the movie, Caddy Shack.
| 39 | 10 | "Two Heads Are Better Than None" | Doug Molitor | September 20, 1991 |
Beetlejuice says the wrong thing and gets his head put onto the Monster Across the Street's body; now the Monster's got two heads, and BJ's body is left to wander.
| 40 | 11 | "Beauty and the Beetle" | Tony Marino | September 23, 1991 |
Coincidentally on the very same day Lydia has doubts about her own beauty, the great beast Thing Thong, who steals beautiful things because he feels he is himself ugly, kidnaps her. While Lydia helps Thing Thong find confidence in himself, Beetlejuice tries to save her in the guise of the famed adventurer Grimdiana Bones. Title reference: Beauty and the Beast (1991 film)
| 41 | 12 | "Creepy Cookies" | Gordon Kent | September 24, 1991 |
When Lydia joins the Happy Face Girls, Beetlejuice laughs until he finds out how much money a cookie drive can pull in. He rushes back to the Neitherworld where he assembles the Sappy Face Ghouls and gives them some of his homemade cookies to sell in Peaceful Pines.
| 42 | 13 | "Poe Pourri" | Tony Marino | September 25, 1991 |
Edgar Allan Poe comes to BJ's Roadhouse in search of his lost Lenore. This is followed by a series of nightmares Beetlejuice experiences that are loosely based on Poe's works.
| 43 | 14 | "Ear's Looking at You" | Tony Marino | September 26, 1991 |
A Sam Spade spoof featuring two ears cut off from a family fortune.
| 44 | 15 | "Beetlebones" | Kathleen Lawrance, Tedd Anasti and Patsy Cameron | September 27, 1991 |
Beetlejuice's sophisticated skeleton escapes from his skin and runs off. Lydia, Jacques, and BJ's skin must recapture Beetlebones before the Skeleton Crew does.
| 45 | 16 | "Smell-a-thon" | Larry Parr | September 30, 1991 |
When BJ finds out that Lydia's involved with a Save the Whales telethon, he gets an idea: hold his own telethon and make a fortune. He holds a Save-the-Smells Telethon to do just that until he actually, truly, begins to believe in his cause. When the telethon money mysteriously disappears, Public Opinion rises squarely against Beetlejuice.
| 46 | 17 | "The Miss Beauty-Juice Pageant" | Larry Parr | October 1, 1991 |
Beetlejuice wants to enter the First Neitherworld Beauty Pageant (the prize is a Ton o' Cash), but is turned down because he's a man. Determined to win the prize, BJ launches a "Men Are Beautiful Too" campaign, closely followed by a "Disgusting is Beautiful Too" campaign, and the pageant is opened to everybody. NOTE: Lydia doesn't appear in this episode.
| 47 | 18 | "Sappiest Place on Earth" | Marty Isenberg and Robert N. Skir | October 2, 1991 |
When the Happy Face Girls' outing is called off on account of rain, BJ (as Denmother MacCree) takes them to Grislyland, the Neitherworld's newest theme park, but Grislyland's patron cartoon character, the evil Bartholomew Batt, is out for more than a profitable enterprise. Title reference: Walt Disney World
| 48 | 19 | "Brinkadoom" | Terrence McDonnell | October 3, 1991 |
BJ, Lydia, and Doomie accidentally tumble into Brinkadoom, a cursed village that disappears for eternity if every villager falls asleep. The three of them need to find a way out before they go with the village. Title Reference: This story is based on the play, Brigadoon, about a Scottish village that appears only once every 100 years.
| 49 | 20 | "Foreign Exchange" | Patsy Cameron, Tedd Anasti and Evelyn A-R Gabai | October 4, 1991 |
When a beautiful Scandinavian exchange student arrives at Miss Shannon's school, Claire thinks she will burst with envy until she relieves her fury by embarrassing the exchange student in front of everybody. To get even, Lydia and BJ send Claire to be an exchange student herself in the Neitherworld.
| 50 | 21 | "Family Scarelooms" | Michael Edens | October 7, 1991 |
BJ's parents want to join the Society for the Oldest and Moldiest Families of the Neitherworld, but they need the Juice family coat of arms to prove their lineage. The coat is somewhere in Beetlejuice's room, which has never been cleaned.
| 51 | 22 | "Them Bones, Them Bones, Them Funny Bones" | Larry Parr | October 8, 1991 |
Lydia is to MC at her school's talent night, but she's afraid she isn't funny enough. BJ lends her his funny bone.
| 52 | 23 | "Hotel Hello" | Patsy Cameron and Tedd Anasti | October 9, 1991 |
Charles needs a weekend to relax, so Mr. Beetleman takes the Deetzes to Hotel Hello in the Neitherworld.
| 53 | 24 | "Goody Two Shoes" | Evelyn A-R Gabai, Patsy Cameron and Tedd Anasti | October 10, 1991 |
It's "Good Neighbor Day" in the Neitherworld, when being nice is a law, but BJ won't stand for it, and causes trouble which lures in Goody Two Shoes, an annoying fairy from the Bureau of Sweetness and Prissiness (BSnP). With a wave of her wand, Goody turns everyone into denizens of Mister Rogers' Neighborhood in an effort to help.
| 54 | 25 | "Vidiots" | Mike Keyes and Jeff Abal | October 11, 1991 |
A video game called Scourge sucks Lydia and Beetlejuice into cyberspace, and they must outsmart the computer if they ever hope to escape.
| 55 | 26 | "Ship of Ghouls" | Terrence McDonnell | October 14, 1991 |
Beetlejuice illegally wins two tickets for an ocean cruise and takes Lydia on a very odd vacation on the high seas.
| 56 | 27 | "Poultrygeist" | J.D. Smith | October 15, 1991 |
A leftover chicken in BJ's fridge turns undead and haunts the Roadhouse in the form of the most dreaded of all specters: a Poultrygeist. Beetlejuice and Lydia must banish it before sleep deprivation claims BJ's last remaining shreds of sanity.
| 57 | 28 | "It's a Wonderful Afterlife" | Julianne Klemm | October 16, 1991 |
Beetlejuice has an off day and wishes he had never met any of his friends. Clarence Sale shows up and shows him what the Neitherworld and the real world would be like without him. Ginger becomes a famous dancer, Jacques is a restaurateur, and the Monster Across the Street is a literal ambulance-chasing lawyer. Worst of all, Lydia is alone and friendless because she never had BJ to make her smile.
| 58 | 29 | "Ghost Writer in the Sky" | Steve Cuden | October 17, 1991 |
Beetlejuice publishes his auto-dieography and is heralded as one of the finest authors of all time, but the lies he tells about his friends in the book come back to haunt him, big time.
| 59 | 30 | "Cabin Fever" | Mark Edens | October 18, 1991 |
After spending all day curing Lydia of her measles, Beetlejuice gets Cabin Fever and then is quarantined to the Roadhouse. Lydia must figure out to help BJ get over Cabin Fever.
| 60 | 31 | "Highs-Ghoul Confidential" | Marty Isenberg and Robert N. Skir | October 21, 1991 |
While flipping through Beetlejuice's high school yearbook, Lydia is astounded to discover that her best friend was none other than Prom King. She presses BJ for the story, and he tells it and it is one doozy of a tale.
| 61 | 32 | "Rotten Sports" | Mark Edens | October 22, 1991 |
Beetlejuice recruits Lydia to coach Team BJ in the Neitherworld All Ghoul Games, but the team is hopeless and the opposition is fierce. Lydia tries to motivate her friends to win the competition.
| 62 | 33 | "Mr. Beetlejuice Goes to Town" | Sandy Sceany | October 23, 1991 |
When Mayor Maynot threatens to tear down the Roadhouse to make room for a new superhighway, Beetlejuice runs for office and wins. It is soon apparent that BJ is an even more corrupt mayor than the last one, and it's up to his friends to get him impeached before he gets too out of hand.
| 63 | 34 | "Time Flies" | Michael Edens | October 24, 1991 |
It's the anniversary of the day Beetlejuice and Lydia met, and BJ presents Lydia with a watch, but time flies, and Beetlejuice and Lydia follow the escaped watch through the Sands of Time, where they meet Grandfather Time. BJ gives the poor old geezer a cog attack, thoroughly messing up the flow of Time. They must get time restarted or nothing will be the same again.
| 64 | 35 | "To Beetle or Not to Beetle" | Mark Edens | October 25, 1991 |
Lydia has to write a paper on William Shakespeare for her English class, but can't understand his plays. BJ takes her to the Neitherworld's Backstage of the Beyond to meet Mr. Shakespeare's "played out" characters Lord Macbeth, Lady Macbeth, Romeo (who was broken off from Juliet when she became a television star), Prince Hamlet, the two halves of Henry IV, and Julius Caesar who turn out to be rather disgruntled with their roles and want better roles. When they kidnap Lydia and try to force her to rewrite their plays, BJ must rescue her while contending with Puck. After cutting a deal with Shakespeare's characters to find Shakespeare, it's up to BJ and Lydia to find Shakespeare and cure him of his monumental writer's block.
| 65 | 36 | "A Star Is Bored" | Stephen Sustarsic and Steven Cuden | October 28, 1991 |
Beetlejuice becomes the Neitherworld's grossest movie star, and finds that fame isn't all it's cracked up to be. Lydia then has to help him back into poverty by "cleaning up his act".
| 66 | 37 | "Oh, Brother!" | Mark Edens | October 29, 1991 |
Beetlejuice's perfect little brother Donnyjuice comes to visit, leaving BJ feeling a bit down and out. Donny and Lydia set out to make Beetlejuice feel better before he does something drastic.
| 67 | 38 | "Snugglejuice" | Marty Isenberg and Robert N. Skir | October 30, 1991 |
It's Pranksgiving in the Neitherworld, and Beetlejuice's rival Germs Pondscum looks as if he's going to beat BJ for the title of Grand High Prankster. Pondscum proves himself to be lower than a Sandworm's belly when he frames Beetlejuice for a crime he didn't commit and gets him sentenced to rehabilitation in NeitherNeitherLand. Beetlejuice comes out of the ordeal as Snugglejuice, the Cutest Being in the Neitherworld. Lydia must reverse the process and help BJ win the Prank Tournament.
| 68 | 39 | "In the Schticks" | Patricia Goldstone | October 31, 1991 |
When Beetlejuice and Lydia pull a scam, Lydia gets sentenced to washing dishes at the Last Resort Resort on the River Schticks. Beetlejuice, haunted by memories of his Uncle Sid and Aunt Irma taking him to the Last Resort Resort when he was a baby, rushes to Lydia's rescue.
| 69 | 40 | "Recipe for Disaster" | Michael Edens | November 1, 1991 |
Lydia's Caesar salad comes to life and attempts to take over the Neitherworld with his legion of surly vegetables. BJ and Lydia have to usurp Caesar and get the rightful rulers of Aroma back on the throne.
| 70 | 41 | "Substitute Creature" | Pat Corcoran | November 4, 1991 |
Lydia makes a foolish wish that Beetlejuice could teach her class for a day, and he grants it. He takes Lydia, Claire, Bertha and Prudence on a trip to "Historyland" in the Neitherworld, where they learn a bit more than history, like never trust a professor in a striped suit.
| 71 | 42 | "Ghoul of My Dreams" | Marty Isenberg and Robert N. Skir | November 5, 1991 |
The Monster and Monstress have a falling out, and Beetlejuice takes advantage of the situation by spinning their misery off into a highly rated TV program. NOTE: Lydia doesn't appear in this episode.
| 72 | 43 | "Prairie Strife" | Julianne Klemm | November 6, 1991 |
Beetlejuice inherits Auntie Em's milk farm, located in the Wild West, but the infamous outlaw Jesse Germs has been threatening the locals. BJ and Lydia must find a way to thwart his insidious plan to scare everyone off the land.
| 73 | 44 | "Moby Richard" | J.D. Smith | November 7, 1991 |
Beetlejuice and Lydia put on "Disasterpiece Theatre", and decide to do Moby-Dick as their first episode. But Moby "Richard" refuses to change the classic to suit Beetlejuice's notions of what a classic should be, and quits (but not without insulting BJ first). BJ lets the character of Captain Ahab take him over, and leads the others on a dangerous mission through Sandworm Land to get revenge on the whale.
| 74 | 45 | "The Unnatural" | Michael Reid | November 8, 1991 |
It's BJ's team against Scuzzo's team in the baseball event of the century, but after a few setbacks, that becomes Beetlejuice and Lydia, all alone, against Scuzzo's entire team.
| 75 | 46 | "Forget Me Nuts" | Lester P. Lester | November 11, 1991 |
Beetlejuice loses his memory after he gets hit on the head by a satellite, so Lydia takes him to see Dr. Zigmund Void. Dr. Void splits BJ's personality, and takes the clone and Lydia within BJ's body by way of a shrinking submersible. They have to find out what is causing BJ's inability to access his memory banks before time runs out and they return to normal size.
| 76 | 47 | "The Birdbrain of Alcatraz" | David Young and J.D. Smith | November 12, 1991 |
Scuzzo frames Beetlejuice for stealing bad jokes, and gets him sent to the Big House. It's up to Lydia to gather up the evidence she needs to spring Beetlejuice and then to get the Governor to listen to her story. Meanwhile, BJ copes with afterlife under the disturbingly nurturing watch of Warden June Cleaver.
| 77 | 48 | "Generally Hysterical Hospital" | Peter Sauder | November 13, 1991 |
Lydia trips on Beetlejuice's misplaced marbles and sprains her ankle, so BJ takes her to a Neitherworld hospital for treatment. A greedy resident doctor is looking to make a quick buck and kidnaps Lydia with the intention of charging admission to the public to witness a "total body transplant" with BJ as the surgeon.
| 78 | 49 | "Super Zeroes" | Marty Isenberg and Robert N. Skir | November 14, 1991 |
Beetlejuice tries to cash in on the superhero trend sweeping the Neitherworld by becoming UltraBeetleMan. With Lydia as his cub reporter sidekick, UBM sets out to thwart crime. Suddenly, Mt. Gushmore, Scumdon Bridge, the Fallen Arches of Triumph, the Awful Tower, and Lydia are shrunk by four menacing business tycoons.
| 79 | 50 | "Beetle Geezer" | J.D. Smith | November 15, 1991 |
Lydia treats her grandmother as if she's too old to do anything, and Grandma gets sick of it. With the help of Beetlejuice (disguised as Mr. Beetleman's father Grandpa Beetleman), Grandma Deetz takes all the other disgruntled inhabitants of the old folk's home on a wild tour of the Neitherworld.
| 80 | 51 | "A Very Grimm Fairy Tale" | Lester P. Lester | November 18, 1991 |
Beetlejuice is threatened into telling the Sappy Face Ghouls a fairy tale, and they don't want to hear one they already know, as they know them all. BJ finally resorts to inventing a story on the spot, featuring himself, Lydia, Flubbo, and other Neitherworld characters.
| 81 | 52 | "Wizard of Ooze" | Alan Bunce and J.D. Smith | November 19, 1991 |
In a Wizard of Oz spoof, Lydia is Dorothy, BJ is the Scarecrow, Jacques is the Bone Woodsman, the Monster is the Lion, Ginger is Toto, Claire is the Wicked Witch, and someone is a Wizard.
| 82 | 53 | "What Makes B.J. Run" | David Finley | November 20, 1991 |
Mr. Monitor cancels Beetlejuice's show, and while Lydia gets her own children's show which she hates, BJ goes to work in the mailroom. He quickly takes the opportunity to steal a colleague's show ideas and is rapidly promoted to Mr. Monitor's supervisor.
| 83 | 54 | "The Chromazone" | John Halfpenny | November 21, 1991 |
Beetlejuice gets pulled into the Chromazone, a Twilight Zone spoof. There, BJ has to help Tod Sperling defeat Ima Loony, one of his creations who has begun writing her own scripts, but BJ loses his mind (literally) in the process. If Lydia can't get into the Chromazone in time, BJ will be brainless forever, not to mention vapid.
| 84 | 55 | "It's a Big, Big, Big, Big Ape" | Alan Bunce | November 22, 1991 |
When Captain Kidder washes up on the beach babbling of a 90-feet-tall, singing, dancing ape on a tiny island in the middle of the ocean, chaos breaks out. Between BJ and Lydia, Jacques and Ginger, the Monster and Poopsie, the Mayor and Mrs. Bugsly, Chester Slime and Armhold Musclehugger, and Scuzzo and Fuzzo, everyone wants to reach the island and get the valuable ape first.
| 85 | 56 | "The Neitherworld's Least Wanted" | Robert N. Skir and Marty Isenberg | November 25, 1991 |
Four of Beetlejuice's worst enemies and the annoying Lipscum are organized together by a mysterious gangster named Mr. Big, who's got BJ's number. His plan is trick BJ into separating his body parts and be unable to reunite them, until sundown destroys him. Naturally, Mr. Monitor is on the scene to gather ratings.
| 86 | 57 | "Don't Beetlejuice and Drive" | Dan DiStefano and J. D. Smith | November 26, 1991 |
Beetlejuice and Doomie are caught distributing phony driver's licenses and sent to traffic school, but BJ's got a plan to escape, and winds up as a hero. NOTE: Lydia doesn't appear in this episode.
| 87 | 58 | "Robbin Juice of Sherweird Forest" | David Finley | November 27, 1991 |
In a spoof of Robin Hood, Beetlejuice moves to Sherweird Forest and attempts to steal from the rich, but the Sheriff of RottingHam kidnaps Lydia and he must rescue her from Prince John DonJuan, the Sherweird Florist, before she crumbles under his bad puns (and also his roses, to which she's allergic).
| 88 | 59 | "Midnight Scum" | Robert N. Skir and Marty Isenberg | November 28, 1991 |
Donny is a wanted man with a huge price on his head, which makes for a perfect opportunity for Beetlejuice to get a little "closer" to his brother (with the aid of handcuffs, of course). BJ isn't the only reward seeker on the scene: he must contend with Dedder Alive, the famous bounty hunter from Neitherworld TV.
| 89 | 60 | "Gold Rush Fever" | Michael Edens | November 29, 1991 |
Beetlejuice is literally bitten by the gold bug and contracts the dreaded Gold Fever. He must find some gold or he'll never get well, but a claim jumper has his eye on BJ's prospect. Lydia, Jacques, and Doomie must help him get better.
| 90 | 61 | "Relatively Pesty" | John Antoniou and Tom Johnstone | December 2, 1991 |
Beetlejuice inadvertently turns some ants into his Aunts - Auntie Pasto, Auntie Social, Auntie Septic, and Honey Aunt. The Aunts promptly begin getting Beetlejuice and Lydia into trouble. If BJ can't get rid of them pronto, his landlord will throw him out.
| 91 | 62 | "King B.J." | Jim Carlson and Terrence McDonnell | December 3, 1991 |
Beetlejuice and Lydia go to visit Merlin and discover that the great magician is plotting to overthrow the King. When BJ pulls the Board from the Bone, he becomes the new King, and Merlin summons the dreaded B.O. Wolf to wipe him out.
| 92 | 63 | "Catmandu Got Your Tongue" | Julianne Klemm | December 4, 1991 |
A black cat burglar makes off with Beetlejuice's tongue and takes it to Catmandu. BJ, after "borrowing" the Monster's tongue, joins the Forlorn Legion with Jacques to storm Catmandu and get his stolen property back. NOTE: Lydia doesn't appear in this episode.
| 93 | 64 | "Journey to the Centre of the Neitherworld" | David Silverman | December 5, 1991 |
To get out of housework, BJ passes the time by telling Lydia about the time he and Jacques journeyed to the centre of the Neitherworld to rescue Vern Jewels, who was being held prisoner by Captain Nemo, who wanted to be rewritten into a hero role.
| 94 | 65 | "Not So Peaceful Pines" | Michael Edens | December 6, 1991 |
Beetlejuice does the Mayor of Peaceful Pines a favor, but the Mayor reneges on his promise of a cash reward. Beetlejuice, in a fit of anger, splits his personality into his good and his bad sides, Posijuice and Negajuice. Negajuice wreaks havoc on the town, and Lydia and Posijuice are forced to fetch Dr. Zigmund Void to help remedy the situation.
