= All I Fuckin' Know =

Compilation album by Eddie Murphy
- Released: April 28, 1998
- Recorded: 1982–1989
- Genre: Comedy
- Length: 48:36
- Label: Sony Records
- Producer: Eddie Murphy

Eddie Murphy chronology
Greatest Comedy Hits (1997)	All I Fuckin' Know (1998)

Professional ratings
Review scores
Source	Rating
Allmusic	3/5 stars

All I Fuckin' Know (titled All I "$%*#@*#" Know on the cover) is the second compilation album and seventh album overall by comedian/singer, Eddie Murphy. The album was released on April 28, 1998, for Sony Records and was produced by Eddie Murphy. All I Fuckin' Know contained both stand-up comedy sketches and songs that Murphy recorded in the 1980s.

== Track listing ==
All tracks by Eddie Murphy, except where noted.

1. "Singers" - 10:02
2. "Put Your Mouth on Me" (Murphy, Narada Michael Walden, Jeffrey Cohen) - 4:03
3. "Doo-Doo/Christmas Gifts" - 6:46
4. "Buckwheat" - 2:01
5. "TV" - 2:01
6. "With All I Know" (Murphy, Trenten Gumbs) - 4:04
7. "Politics, Racism" - 4:32
8. "Ice Cream Man/Shoe Throwin' Mothers" - 5:49
9. "Boogie in Your Butt" (David Wolfert, Murphy) - 4:04
10. "Till the Money's Gone" (Murphy, Walden, Skyler Jett) - 5:14
