= Eddie Murphy: Comedian =

- Cover photo by Lynn Goldsmith

Live album by Eddie Murphy
- Released: October 24, 1983
- Recorded: August 17–18, 1983
- Venue: DAR Constitution Hall, Washington, D.C.
- Genre: Comedy
- Length: 50:12
- Label: Columbia Records
- Producer: Eddie Murphy, Richard Tienken, Robert Wachs

Eddie Murphy chronology
| Eddie Murphy (1982) | Eddie Murphy: Comedian (1983) | How Could It Be (1985) |

Eddie Murphy: Comedian (1983) is Eddie Murphy's second comedy album. The album was the recipient of one Grammy, Best Comedy Album, at the 1984 Grammy Awards.

The full concert of this performance was released as a 1983 HBO special called Eddie Murphy Delirious.

Professional ratings
Review scores
| Source | Rating |
|---|---|
| Allmusic | 4/5 stars |

== Track listing ==
1. Faggots Revisited/Sexual Prime – 8:09
2. Singers – 10:04
3. Ice Cream Man/Shoe Throwin' Mothers – 5:52
4. Modern Women – 2:16
5. The Barbecue – 12:44
6. The Fart Game – 1:55
7. Politics/Racism – 4:34
8. Languages – 2:13
9. TV – 2:25

== Charts ==
| Chart (1985) | Peak position |
|---|---|
| US Top LPs & Tape (Billboard) | 35 |
| Australia (Kent Music Report) | 94 |

== Certifications ==
| Region | Certification | Certified units/sales |
|---|---|---|
| United States (RIAA) | 2× Platinum | 2,000,000^{^} |
^{^} Shipments figures based on certification alone.
