= Eddie Murphy (album) =

Live album by Eddie Murphy
- Released: November 6, 1982
- Recorded: April 30 – May 1, 1982
- Venues: The Comic Strip, New York City, New York
- Genres: Stand-up comedy Comedy rap
- Length: 48:20
- Label: Columbia Records
- Producers: Eddie Murphy, Robert Wachs, David Wolfert

Eddie Murphy chronology
Eddie Murphy (1982)	Eddie Murphy: Comedian (1983)

Eddie Murphy is the debut solo album by Eddie Murphy. It was released on November 6, 1982, on Columbia Records. It was certified as a Gold record and received a Grammy Award nomination. The album drew ire from the gay community, Asian-American groups and women's groups for some of the humor.

In terms of material, the release draws upon Murphy's work on the program Saturday Night Live. The recording took place from April 30, 1982, to May 1, 1982, capturing some of Murphy's routines at the New York City venue The Comic Strip. In addition to the comedy tracks, the album contained two songs, including the parody hip-hop song "Boogie in Your Butt", which became a minor hit on the R&B charts.

Professional ratings
Review scores
Source	Rating
Allmusic	link

== Critical reception ==
Reviewing the album for AllMusic, critic Bret Adams wrote, "Despite Murphy's gifts, his first standup comedy album, 1982's Eddie Murphy, is uneven despite containing some classic routines." In The Boston Phoenix, Joyce Millman said that "Judging from the angry-young-black routines on his album, [Murphy] seems to feel that silliness isn't enough. And these bits fall flat because he sounds uncomfortably like a Richard Pryor impersonator, funkying up his articulate, nice-boy voice."

== Track listing ==
All tracks by Eddie Murphy, except where noted.

1. "Faggots" – 2:08
2. "Buckwheat" – 1:57
3. "Black Movie Theaters" – 2:33
4. "Talking Cars" – 0:59
5. "Doo-Doo/Christmas Gifts" – 6:44
6. "Myths/A Little Chinese" – 7:59
7. "Boogie in Your Butt" (Murphy, Wolfert) – 4:11
8. "Drinking Fathers" – 4:05
9. "Effrom" – 1:58
10. "The Pope and Ronald Reagan" – 4:39
11. "Hit by a Car" – 6:50
12. "Enough Is Enough" (Jabara, Roberts) – 4:17

== Production ==
- Produced by Eddie Murphy, Robert Wachs and David Wolfert
- Recorded and engineered by Jack Malken
- Mastered by Jack Adelman and Paul Brizzi
- Remastering: Kevin Boutote

== Certifications ==
Region	Certification	Certified units/sales
United States (RIAA)	Platinum	1,000,000^{^}
^{^} Shipments figures based on certification alone.
