= Studio Distribution Services =

American distributor of entertainment media

Studio Distribution Services, LLC
- Type: Subsidiary
- Industry: Home video
- Founded: January 14, 2020; 6 years ago
- Headquarters: 10 Universal City Plaza, Universal City, California, United States
- Key people: Eddie Cunningham (president)
- Products: Home video releases
- Owner: Conectiv Supply Chain Solutions
- Website: sds.media

Studio Distribution Services (SDS) is an American home entertainment distribution company founded as a joint venture between Universal Pictures Home Entertainment and Warner Bros. Home Entertainment. SDS distributes media for all titles handled by Universal and Warner Bros., as well as their respective studios and partners.

== History ==
The company was created on January 14, 2020, when Universal and Warner Bros. merged their physical home media distribution operations into one entity as part of a 10-year multinational joint-venture partnership. Internationally, Universal distributed Warner Bros.' titles in Germany, Austria, Switzerland, Japan (until 2025) and Spain (since May 2022); while Warner distributed Universal's titles in the United Kingdom (until 2025), Italy (until 2024) and Benelux. On April 7, 2020, the European Commission approved the merger.

On August 4, 2026, disc manufacturer Conectiv Supply Chain Solutions (formerly owned by Vantiva) announced that it had acquired SDS from Universal and Warner, uniting both manufacturing and distribution capabilities.
