= List of accolades received by Evita (1996 film) =

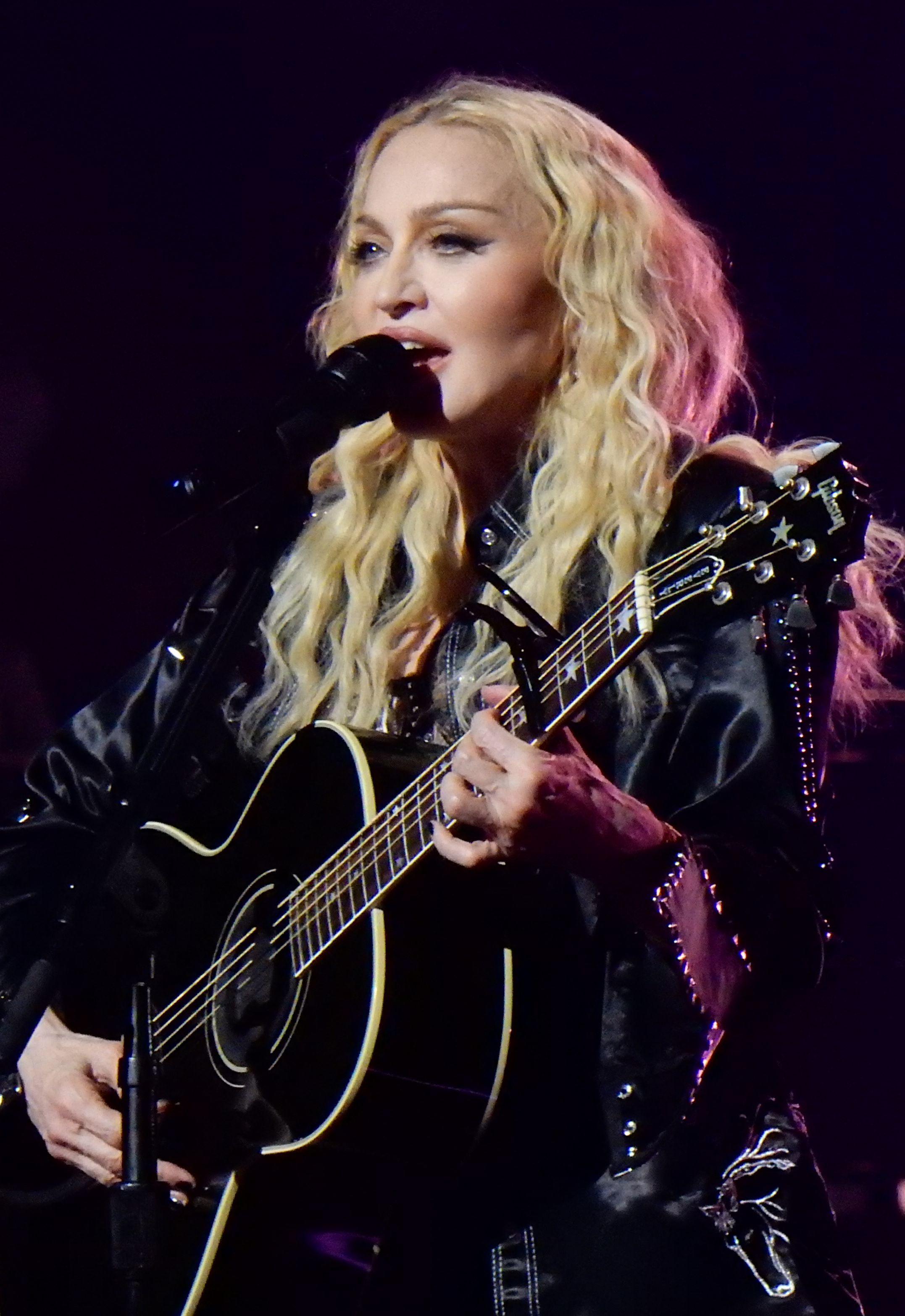
- Madonna won a Golden Globe Award for Best Actress in Motion Picture Musical or Comedy for portraying Eva Perón in the film.
Accolades
Award	Won	Nominated
Academy Awards	1	5
American Cinema Editors	0	1
American Film Institute 100 Years	0	2
American Music Awards	0	1
American Society of Cinematographers	0	1
Blockbuster Entertainment Awards	1	3
British Academy Film Awards	0	8
British Society of Cinematographers	0	1
Broadcast Film Critics Association	0	1
Chicago Film Critics Association	0	1
Golden Globe Awards	3	5
Guinness World Records	1	1
Italian National Syndicate of Film Journalists	1	2
Los Angeles Film Critics Association Awards	1	1
MTV Movie Awards	0	2
National Board of Review	1	1
Satellite Awards	3	5
- Total number of awards and nominations (Note: Certain award groups do not simply award one winner. They recognize several different recipients and have runners-up. Since this is a specific recognition and is different from losing an award, runner-up mentions are considered wins in this award tally.)
Totals	12	23
- References

Evita is a 1996 American musical drama film based on Tim Rice and Andrew Lloyd Webber's musical of the same name about First Lady of Argentina, Eva Perón. Directed by Alan Parker and written by Parker and Oliver Stone, the film starred Madonna, Antonio Banderas, and Jonathan Pryce in the leading roles of Eva, Ché and Juan Perón respectively. Rice and Webber composed the film's musical score, while Darius Khondji was the cinematographer. Vincent Paterson created the choreography for the film and Gerry Hambling was responsible for editing. Penny Rose designed and created the period costumes for the film, and Brian Morris was the set designer.

Made on a budget of $56 million (equivalent to $115 million in 2025), Evita was released on December 25, 1996, and grossed over $141 million (equivalent to $289 million in 2025) worldwide. Rotten Tomatoes, a review aggregator, surveyed 37 reviews and judged 62% to be positive. The film garnered awards and nominations in several categories and has won 19 awards from 40 nominations, with particular recognition for Madonna, Parker, Rice, Webber, and the song "You Must Love Me" from the film.

At the 69th ceremony of the Academy Awards, Evita was nominated in five categories, and went on to win Best Original Song for "You Must Love Me" (for Rice and Webber). The song won the same category at the 54th Golden Globe Awards and was nominated in four other categories, including Best Motion Picture – Musical or Comedy and Best Actress – Motion Picture Comedy or Musical, with the latter won by Madonna. She was also listed by the Guinness World Records under the category of Most Costume Changes in a Film—she had 85 costume changes in total, and wore 39 hats, 45 pairs of shoes, 56 pairs of earrings and 42 hair designs. Evita garnered eight nominations at the 50th British Academy Film Awards ceremony, but did not win any of them. For his direction, Parker earned the European Silver Ribbon award at the Italian National Syndicate of Film Journalists. The National Board of Review listed Evita as one of their Top Ten Films for 1996 ranking it at number four. It won the Best Film trophy at the 1st Golden Satellite Awards.

== Accolades ==
Award	Date or Year of ceremony	Category	Recipient(s) and nominee(s)	Result	Ref(s)
Academy Awards	March 24, 1997	Best Art Direction	Brian Morris and Philippe Turlure	Nominated	
Academy Awards	March 24, 1997	Best Cinematography	Darius Khondji	Nominated	
Academy Awards	March 24, 1997	Best Film Editing	Gerry Hambling	Nominated	
Academy Awards	March 24, 1997	Best Original Song	"You Must Love Me"; Music by Andrew Lloyd Webber, lyrics by Tim Rice	Won	
Academy Awards	March 24, 1997	Best Sound	Andy Nelson, Anna Behlmer and Ken Weston	Nominated	
American Cinema Editors Eddie Awards	March 15, 1997	Best Edited Feature Film	Gerry Hambling	Nominated	
American Film Institute 100 Years	2004	AFI's 100 Years...100 Songs	"Don't Cry for Me Argentina" from Evita	Nominated	
American Film Institute 100 Years	2006	AFI's Greatest Movie Musicals	Evita	Nominated	
American Music Awards	January 26, 1998	Favorite Soundtrack	Evita	Nominated	
American Society of Cinematographers Awards	February 27, 1997	Outstanding Achievement in Cinematography in Theatrical Releases	Darius Khondji	Nominated	
Blockbuster Entertainment Awards	March 10, 1998	Favorite Actress – Drama	Madonna	Nominated	
Blockbuster Entertainment Awards	March 10, 1998	Favorite Song from a Movie	"Don't Cry for Me Argentina" from Evita	Won	
Blockbuster Entertainment Awards	March 10, 1998	Favorite Soundtrack	Evita	Nominated	
British Academy Film Awards	April 29, 1997	Anthony Asquith Award for Film Music	Andrew Lloyd Webber and Tim Rice	Nominated	
British Academy Film Awards	April 29, 1997	Best Adapted Screenplay	Alan Parker and Oliver Stone	Nominated	
British Academy Film Awards	April 29, 1997	Best Cinematography	Darius Khondji	Nominated	
British Academy Film Awards	April 29, 1997	Best Costume Design	Penny Rose	Nominated	
British Academy Film Awards	April 29, 1997	Best Editing	Gerry Hambling	Nominated	
British Academy Film Awards	April 29, 1997	Best Makeup and Hair	Sarah Monzani and Martin Samuel	Nominated	
British Academy Film Awards	April 29, 1997	Best Production Design	Brian Morris	Nominated	
British Academy Film Awards	April 29, 1997	Best Sound	Anna Behlmer, Eddy Joseph, Andy Nelson, Ken Weston, Nigel Wright	Nominated	
British Society of Cinematographers Awards	1996	Best Cinematography	Darius Khondji	Nominated	
Broadcast Film Critics Association Award	January 20, 1997	Best Picture	Evita	Nominated	
Chicago Film Critics Association Award	March 10, 1997	Best Cinematography	Darius Khondji	Nominated	
Golden Globe Awards	January 19, 1997	Best Actor – Motion Picture Musical or Comedy	Antonio Banderas	Nominated	
Golden Globe Awards	January 19, 1997	Best Actress – Motion Picture Musical or Comedy	Madonna	Won	
Golden Globe Awards	January 19, 1997	Best Director	Alan Parker	Nominated	
Golden Globe Awards	January 19, 1997	Best Motion Picture – Musical or Comedy	Evita	Won	
Golden Globe Awards	January 19, 1997	Best Original Song	"You Must Love Me"; Music by Andrew Lloyd Webber, lyrics by Tim Rice	Won	
Guinness World Records	1997	Most Costume Changes in a Film (85)	Madonna in Evita	Won	
Italian National Syndicate of Film Journalists	January 25, 1997	European Silver Ribbon	Alan Parker	Won	
Italian National Syndicate of Film Journalists	January 25, 1997	Best Foreign Director	Alan Parker	Nominated	
Los Angeles Film Critics Association Awards	December 16, 1996	Best Production Design	Brian Morris for Evita (Tied with Janet Patterson for The Portrait of a Lady)	Won	
MTV Movie Awards	June 10, 1997	Best Female Performance	Madonna	Nominated	
MTV Movie Awards	June 10, 1997	Best Song from a Movie	"Don't Cry for Me Argentina" from Evita	Nominated	
National Board of Review	February 9, 1997	Top Ten Films	Evita	4th Place	
Satellite Awards	January 15, 1997	Best Motion Picture	Evita	Won	
Satellite Awards	January 15, 1997	Best Original Song	"You Must Love Me" from Evita	Won	
Satellite Awards	January 15, 1997	Best Costume Design	Penny Rose	Won	
Satellite Awards	January 15, 1997	Best Cinematography	Darius Khondji	Nominated	
Satellite Awards	January 15, 1997	Best Art Direction	Brian Morris	Nominated	

== See also ==
- 1996 in film
