= Los Angeles Film Critics Association Award for Best Production Design =

Annual US film award

The Los Angeles Film Critics Association Award for Best Production Design is one of the annual film awards given by the Los Angeles Film Critics Association.

== 1990s ==
Year	Winner	Designer
1993	Schindler's List	Allan Starski
1994	The Hudsucker Proxy	Dennis Gassner
1995	A Little Princess	Bo Welch
1996	Evita	Brian Morris
1996	The Portrait of a Lady	Janet Patterson
1997	Titanic	Peter Lamont
1998	Pleasantville	Jeannine Oppewall
1999	Sleepy Hollow	Rick Heinrichs

== 2000s ==
Year	Winner	Designer
2000	Crouching Tiger, Hidden Dragon	Timmy Yip
2001	Moulin Rouge!	Catherine Martin
2002	Gangs of New York	Dante Ferretti
2003	The Lord of the Rings: The Return of the King	Grant Major
2004	The Aviator	Dante Ferretti
2005	2046	William Chang
2006	Pan's Labyrinth	Eugenio Caballero
2007	There Will Be Blood	Jack Fisk
2008	Synecdoche, New York	Mark Friedberg
2009	District 9	Philip Ivey

== 2010s ==
Year	Winner	Designer(s)
2010	Inception	Guy Hendrix Dyas
2011	Hugo	Dante Ferretti
2012	The Master	Jack Fisk and David Crank
2013	Her	K. K. Barrett
2014	The Grand Budapest Hotel	Adam Stockhausen
2015	Mad Max: Fury Road	Colin Gibson
2016	The Handmaiden	Ryu Seong-hie
2017	Blade Runner 2049	Dennis Gassner
2018	Black Panther	Hannah Beachler
2019	Once Upon a Time in Hollywood	Barbara Ling

== 2020s ==
Year	Winner	Designer(s)
2020	Mank	Donald Graham Burt
2021	Barb and Star Go to Vista Del Mar	Steve Saklad
2022	Avatar: The Way of Water	Dylan Cole and Ben Procter
2023	Barbie	Sarah Greenwood
2024	The Brutalist	Judy Becker
2025	Sinners	Hannah Beachler

== Multiple winners ==
3 wins

- Dante Ferretti (2002, 2004, 2011)

2 wins

- Hannah Beachler (2018, 2025)
- Jack Fisk (2007, 2012)
- Dennis Gassner (1994, 2017)
