= 1996 Los Angeles Film Critics Association Awards =

Annual US film awards ceremony

22nd LAFCA Awards
- Date: December 1996

Highlights
- Best Picture: Secrets & Lies

The 22nd Los Angeles Film Critics Association Awards, honoring the best in film for 1996, were given in December 1996.

== Winners ==
- Best Picture:
  - Secrets & Lies
  - Runner-up: Fargo
- Best Director:
  - Mike Leigh – Secrets & Lies
  - Runner-up: Joel Coen – Fargo
- Best Actor:
  - Geoffrey Rush – Shine
  - Runner-up: Eddie Murphy – The Nutty Professor
- Best Actress:
  - Brenda Blethyn – Secrets & Lies
  - Runner-up: Frances McDormand – Fargo
- Best Supporting Actor:
  - Edward Norton – Everyone Says I Love You, The People vs. Larry Flynt and Primal Fear
  - Runner-up: Armin Mueller-Stahl – Shine
- Best Supporting Actress:
  - Barbara Hershey – The Portrait of a Lady
  - Runner-up: Courtney Love – The People vs. Larry Flynt
- Best Screenplay:
  - Joel and Ethan Coen – Fargo
  - Runner-up: Joseph Tropiano and Stanley Tucci – Big Night
- Best Cinematography (tie):
  - Chris Menges – Michael Collins
  - John Seale – The English Patient
- Best Production Design (tie):
  - Brian Morris - Evita
  - Janet Patterson - The Portrait of a Lady
- Best Music Score:
  - Hal Willner and The Hey Hey Club Musicians – Kansas City
  - Runner-up: Elliot Goldenthal – Michael Collins
- Best Foreign-Language Film:
  - La Cérémonie • France/Germany
  - Runner-up: Lamerica • Italy/France/Switzerland
- Best Non-Fiction Film:
  - When We Were Kings
  - Runner-up: Paradise Lost: The Child Murders at Robin Hood Hills
- Best Animation:
  - Nick Park (for his body of work, which includes: Creature Comforts, A Grand Day Out, The Wrong Trousers, and A Close Shave)
- The Douglas Edwards Experimental/Independent Film/Video Award:
  - Craig Baldwin – Sonic Outlaws
- New Generation Award:
  - Emily Watson – Breaking the Waves
- Career Achievement Award:
  - Roger Corman
