= 1996 Academy Awards =

1996 Academy Awards may refer to:

- 68th Academy Awards, the Academy Awards ceremony that took place in 1996
- 69th Academy Awards, the 1997 ceremony honoring the best in film for 1996
