= The Portrait of a Lady (film) =

1996 film by Jane Campion

- Theatrical release poster
- Directed by: Jane Campion
- Screenplay by: Laura Jones
- Based on: The Portrait of a Lady by Henry James
- Produced by: Steve Golin; Monty Montgomery
- Starring: Nicole Kidman; John Malkovich; Barbara Hershey; Mary-Louise Parker; Martin Donovan; Shelley Winters; Richard E. Grant; Shelley Duvall; Christian Bale; Viggo Mortensen; Valentina Cervi; John Gielgud
- Cinematography: Stuart Dryburgh
- Edited by: Veronika Jenet
- Music by: Wojciech Kilar
- Production companies: PolyGram Filmed Entertainment; Propaganda Films
- Distributed by: Gramercy Pictures (United States); PolyGram Filmed Entertainment (United Kingdom)
- Release dates: 28 August 1996 (Venice); 24 December 1996 (United States); 28 February 1997 (United Kingdom)
- Running time: 142 minutes
- Countries: United Kingdom; United States
- Language: English
- Box office: $20 million

The Portrait of a Lady is a 1996 period romantic-drama film directed by Jane Campion and adapted from Henry James' 1881 novel of the same name.

The film stars Nicole Kidman, Barbara Hershey, John Malkovich, Mary-Louise Parker, Martin Donovan, Shelley Duvall, Richard E. Grant, Shelley Winters, Viggo Mortensen, Valentina Cervi, Christian Bale, and John Gielgud. It received two nominations at the 69th Academy Awards: Best Supporting Actress (Hershey) and Best Costume Design (Janet Patterson).

The film tells the story of Isabel Archer, an innocent young woman of independent means manipulated by her "friend" Madame Merle, and the devious Gilbert Osmond.

== Plot ==
In 1872, Isabel Archer is a woman who has already rejected many suitors, including the wealthy Lord Warburton and Caspar Goodwood, to whom she had initially given hope. Caspar's arrival is arranged by Henrietta, a close friend of Isabel who cares for her deeply. Isabel's strong character and free-spirited nature are adored by her cousin, Ralph Touchett, who persuades his father, her uncle, to give Isabel money so that she can be rich and independent. Upon her uncle's death, Isabel receives a fortune.

Isabel encounters Madame Serena and instantly likes her. Learning about Isabel's wealth, Serena decides to arrange a marriage between Isabel and Serena's former lover Gilbert Osmond, who lives in Florence, Italy. Gilbert is a widower and has a daughter Pansy, who grew up in a convent and is not allowed to leave the house, even to walk in the garden, when her father is away. Isabel is enchanted by Gilbert and accepts the proposal; however, she is warned by Ralph that Gilbert is a "small man" and Isabel is giving up her dreams to be in a cage with a worthless husband. Isabel is enraged and slaps Ralph, to which he calmly answers that he said what he must, that he loves Isabel, and that he knows he has no hope. It is also evident that he is slowly dying from consumption.

Gilbert is nice to Isabel until after they are married. Isabel finds herself trapped in Rome in an unhappy marriage with a fear of her abusive husband, who gradually disconnects her from all of her friends. Henrietta, Ralph, and Caspar all leave for England. Pansy is also a victim of her father's controlling behavior; she is in love with Rosier, but Gilbert has decided to arrange a marriage between her and Lord Warburton, who is attentive to Pansy just to get closer to Isabel. Isabel sees the mutual love between Pansy and Rosier and is deeply moved. Gilbert sees through Isabel's schemes to prevent Pansy from becoming engaged to Warburton, but he is too late; Lord Warburton leaves Italy. Gilbert angrily slaps Isabel and steps on her dress so that she falls on the ground. Serena deeply regrets organizing the fateful union between Gilbert and Isabel.

Isabel learns that Ralph is overtaken by consumption and is on his deathbed. She asks Gilbert to let her go to England to be with her dying cousin but receives a cold and negative answer. Pansy is sent to a convent away from her lover. Isabel is pitied by Gilbert's sister, who finally opens Isabel's eyes, telling her that Gilbert's first wife was childless and Pansy is, in fact, Gilbert and Serena's daughter. Isabel finally decides to go against her husband's wishes and leave for England. She visits Pansy and proposes to the girl to flee, but Pansy refuses, saying she wants to please her father. In the convent, Isabel also encounters Serena but proudly ignores her attempts to start a conversation. However, at the last minute before Isabel leaves, Serena runs to her - she has guessed Isabel is going to England to Ralph and reveals to Isabel that Ralph is the one who persuaded the uncle to give Isabel her fortune. On Ralph's deathbed, Isabel tearfully confesses that he has been her best friend and she loves him. Henrietta and Caspar attend Ralph's funeral. In the garden, Caspar tries to persuade Isabel to let go of her fear of her husband. They kiss passionately, but Isabel runs away to the house. She stops before the house door, and leans against it, looking back into the garden.

== Cast ==
- Nicole Kidman as Isabel Archer
- John Malkovich as Gilbert Osmond
- Barbara Hershey as Madame Serena Merle
- Mary-Louise Parker as Henrietta Stackpole
- Martin Donovan as Ralph Touchett
- Shelley Winters as Mrs. Touchett
- Richard E. Grant as Lord Warburton
- Shelley Duvall as Countess Gemini
- Christian Bale as Edward Rosier
- Viggo Mortensen as Caspar Goodwood
- Valentina Cervi as Pansy Osmond
- John Gielgud as Mr. Touchett
- Roger Ashton-Griffiths as Bob Bantling

== Reception ==
The Portrait of a Lady received mixed reviews from critics. It holds a 48% approval rating on Rotten Tomatoes based on 73 reviews. The consensus summarizes: "Beautiful, indulgently heady, and pretentious, The Portrait of a Lady paints Jane Campion's directorial shortcomings in too bright a light." On Metacritic, the film has a score of 60 out of 100, based on 18 critics, indicating "mixed or average reviews". Audiences polled by CinemaScore gave the film a grade of "B−" on an A+ to F scale.

The film grossed $3.7 million in the United States and Canada and $20 million worldwide.

== Accolades ==
Award	Category	Nominee(s)	Result	Ref.
Academy Awards	Best Supporting Actress	Barbara Hershey	Nominated	
Academy Awards	Best Costume Design	Janet Patterson	Nominated	
Chicago Film Critics Association Awards	Best Supporting Actress	Barbara Hershey	Nominated	
Chlotrudis Awards	Best Supporting Actor	Martin Donovan	Nominated	
Chlotrudis Awards	Best Supporting Actress	Barbara Hershey	Nominated	
Golden Globe Awards	Best Supporting Actress – Motion Picture	Barbara Hershey	Nominated	
Los Angeles Film Critics Association Awards	Best Supporting Actress	Barbara Hershey	Won	
Los Angeles Film Critics Association Awards	Best Production Design	Janet Patterson	Won (Note: Tied with Brian Morris for Evita.)	
National Society of Film Critics Awards	Best Supporting Actor	Martin Donovan	Won (Note: Tied with Tony Shalhoub for Big Night.)	
National Society of Film Critics Awards	Best Supporting Actress	Barbara Hershey	Won	
New York Film Critics Circle Awards	Best Actress	Nicole Kidman	Runner-up	
New York Film Critics Circle Awards	Best Supporting Actor	Martin Donovan	Runner-up	
New York Film Critics Circle Awards	Best Supporting Actress	Barbara Hershey	Runner-up	
Online Film & Television Association Awards	Best Supporting Actress	Barbara Hershey	Nominated	
Online Film & Television Association Awards	Best Costume Design	Janet Patterson	Nominated	
Satellite Awards	Best Screenplay – Adapted	Laura Jones	Nominated	
Satellite Awards	Best Art Direction	Janet Patterson	Nominated	
Satellite Awards	Best Costume Design	Janet Patterson	Nominated	
USC Scripter Awards		Laura Jones (screenwriter); Henry James (author)	Nominated	
Venice International Film Festival	Best Film (Pasinetti Award)	Jane Campion	Won	

== Home media ==
On December 11, 2012, Shout! Factory released The Portrait of a Lady: Special Edition on DVD and Blu-ray.

== See also ==
- Cinema of Australia
