= 1997 Academy Awards =

1997 Academy Awards may refer to:

- 69th Academy Awards, the Academy Awards ceremony that took place in 1997
- 70th Academy Awards, the 1998 ceremony honoring the best in film for 1997
