= Janet Patterson =

Australian costume and production designer (1956–2016)

- Born: 12 August 1956; Sydney, New South Wales, Australia
- Died: 21 October 2016 (aged 60); Australia
- Occupations: Costume designer; production designer
- Years active: 1984–2015
- Spouse: Al
- Children: Nina

Janet Patterson (12 August 1956 – 21 October 2016) was an Australian costume designer and production designer, best known for her collaborations with directors Gillian Armstrong and Jane Campion. She has received various accolades, including four AACTA Awards and a BAFTA Award, in addition to nominations for four Academy Awards.

== Early life and education ==
Patterson attended North Sydney Girls High and later attended East Sydney Technical College and Sydney College of the Arts, receiving a Bachelor of Arts in Interior Design and a diploma in Textile Studies and Costume Design. In addition to her studies in Sydney, Patterson received a Winston Churchill Memorial Trust scholarship to study under architect Luigi Snozzi in Switzerland. She began her career in the 1980s working in production design, costume design, and set design for ABC Television.

== Death ==
Patterson's death was announced by her agency, who had stated Patterson's family did not wish to disclose her age or date of death, however actress Nicole Kidman revealed she had died on 21 October 2016.

== Filmography ==
Patterson's film and television credits include:

=== Film ===
List of Janet Patterson film credits
Year	Title	Director	Credited as		Notes
Year	Title	Director	Costume Designer	Production Designer	Notes
1992	The Last Days of Chez Nous	Gillian Armstrong	Yes	Yes	
1993	The Piano	Jane Campion	Yes	No	
1996	The Portrait of a Lady	Jane Campion	Yes	Yes	
1997	Oscar and Lucinda	Gillian Armstrong	Yes	No	
1999	Holy Smoke!	Jane Campion	Yes	Yes	
2003	Peter Pan	P. J. Hogan	Yes	No	
2009	Bright Star	Jane Campion	Yes	Yes	
2015	Far from the Madding Crowd	Thomas Vinterberg	Yes	No	

=== Television ===
List of Janet Patterson television credits
Year	Title	Contribution		Notes
Year	Title	Costume Designer	Production Designer	Notes
1984	Who Killed Hannah Jane?	Yes	No	Television film
1984	Sweet and Sour	Yes	No	20 episodes
1985	Palace of Dreams	Yes	No	10 episodes
1985	Displaced Persons	Yes	No	Television film
1986	Dancing Daze	No	Yes	6 episodes
1986	Two Friends	Yes	Yes	Television film
1988	The Lizard King	Yes	Yes	Television film
1989	Edens Lost	No	Yes	3 episodes
1989	Bodysurfer	No	Yes	2 episodes
1990	Come in Spinner	No	Yes	4 episodes

== Awards and nominations ==
Major associations

Academy Awards

Year	Category	Nominated work	Result	Ref.
1994	Best Costume Design	The Piano	Nominated	
1997	Best Costume Design	The Portrait of a Lady	Nominated	
1998	Best Costume Design	Oscar and Lucinda	Nominated	
2010	Best Costume Design	Bright Star	Nominated	

BAFTA Awards

Year	Category	Nominated work	Result	Ref.
British Academy Film Awards
1994	Best Costume Design	The Piano	Won	
2010	Best Costume Design	Bright Star	Nominated	

Miscellaneous awards

List of Janet Patterson other awards and nominations
Award	Year (Note: Indicates the year of ceremony. Each year is linked to the article about the awards held that year, wherever possible.)	Category	Title	Result	Ref.
AACTA Awards	1992	Best Production Design	The Last Days of Chez Nous	Nominated	
AACTA Awards	1993	Best Costume Design	The Piano	Won	
AACTA Awards	1998	Best Costume Design	Oscar and Lucinda	Won	
AACTA Awards	2010	Best Costume Design	Bright Star	Won	
AACTA Awards	2010	Best Production Design	Bright Star	Won	
Critics' Choice Awards	2010	Best Costume Design	Bright Star	Nominated	
Inside Film Awards	2010	Best Production Design	Bright Star	Won	
Los Angeles Film Critics Association Awards	1996	Best Production Design	The Portrait of a Lady	Won (Note: Tied with Brian Morris for Evita)	
Satellite Awards	1997	Best Art Direction & Production Design	The Portrait of a Lady	Nominated	
Satellite Awards	1997	Best Costume Design	The Portrait of a Lady	Nominated	
Satellite Awards	2016	Best Costume Design	Far from the Madding Crowd	Nominated	
Saturn Awards	2004	Best Costume Design	Peter Pan	Nominated	
