= 69th Academy Awards =

- Official poster by Arnold Schwartzman
- Date: March 24, 1997
- Site: Shrine Auditorium, Los Angeles, California, U.S.
- Hosted by: Billy Crystal
- Produced by: Gil Cates
- Directed by: Louis J. Horvitz

Highlights
- Best Picture: The English Patient
- Most awards: The English Patient (9)
- Most nominations: The English Patient (12)

TV in the United States
- Network: ABC
- Duration: 3 hours, 35 minutes
- Ratings: 40.08 million 27.49% (Nielsen ratings)

The 69th Academy Awards ceremony, organized by the Academy of Motion Picture Arts and Sciences (AMPAS) took place on March 24, 1997, at the Shrine Auditorium in Los Angeles beginning at 6:00 p.m. PST / 9:00 p.m. EST. During the ceremony, AMPAS presented the Academy Awards (commonly referred to as Oscars) in 24 categories honoring films released in 1996. The ceremony, televised in the United States by ABC, was produced by Gil Cates, and directed by Louis J. Horvitz. Actor Billy Crystal hosted the show for the fifth time. He first presided over the 62nd ceremony held in 1990 and had last hosted the 65th ceremony held in 1993. Three weeks earlier, in a ceremony held at the Regent Beverly Wilshire Hotel in Beverly Hills, California, on March 1, the Academy Awards for Technical Achievement were presented by host Helen Hunt.

The English Patient won nine awards, including Best Picture. Other winners included Fargo with two awards and Breathing Lessons: The Life and Work of Mark O'Brien, Dear Diary, Emma, Evita, The Ghost and the Darkness, Independence Day, Jerry Maguire, Kolya, The Nutty Professor, Quest, Shine, Sling Blade, and When We Were Kings with one.

== Winners and nominees ==
The nominees for the 69th Academy Awards were announced on February 11, 1997, at the Samuel Goldwyn Theater in Beverly Hills, California, by Arthur Hiller, president of the academy, and actress Mira Sorvino. The English Patient received the most nominations with twelve; Fargo and Shine came in second with seven apiece.

The winners were announced during the awards ceremony on March 24, 1997. The English Patient became the first film to win nine Oscars since The Last Emperor at the 60th Academy Awards in 1988. Saul Zaentz became the third person to produce three Best Picture winners, having previously produced One Flew Over the Cuckoo's Nest and Amadeus. He also became the seventh individual to receive an Oscar and the Irving G. Thalberg Memorial Award in the same year. Best Actress winner Frances McDormand was the first person to win for a role in a film directed by their spouse. Best Original Musical or Comedy Score winner Rachel Portman became the first female winner for composing a musical score.

=== Awards ===
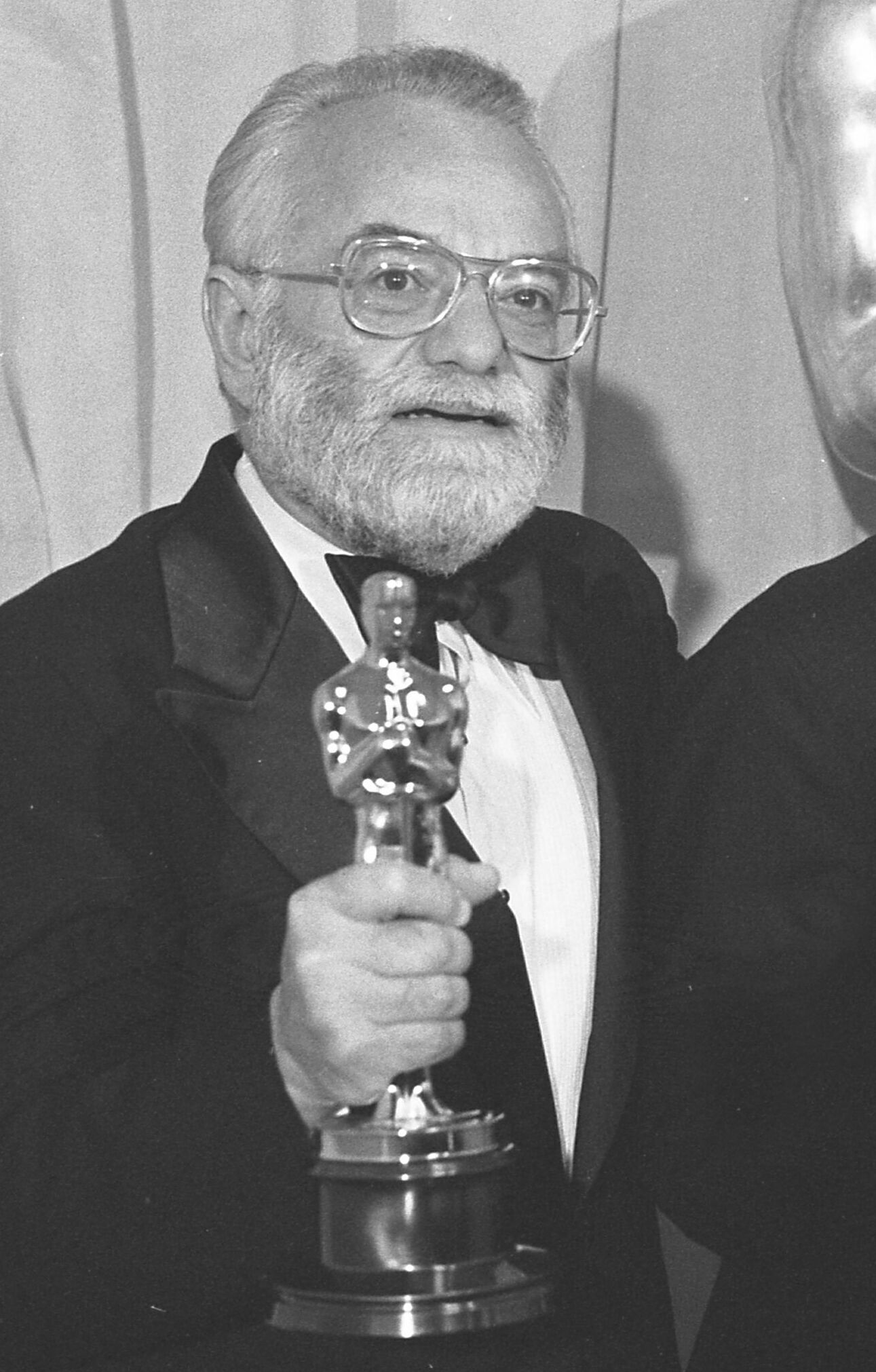
Saul Zaentz, Best Picture winner

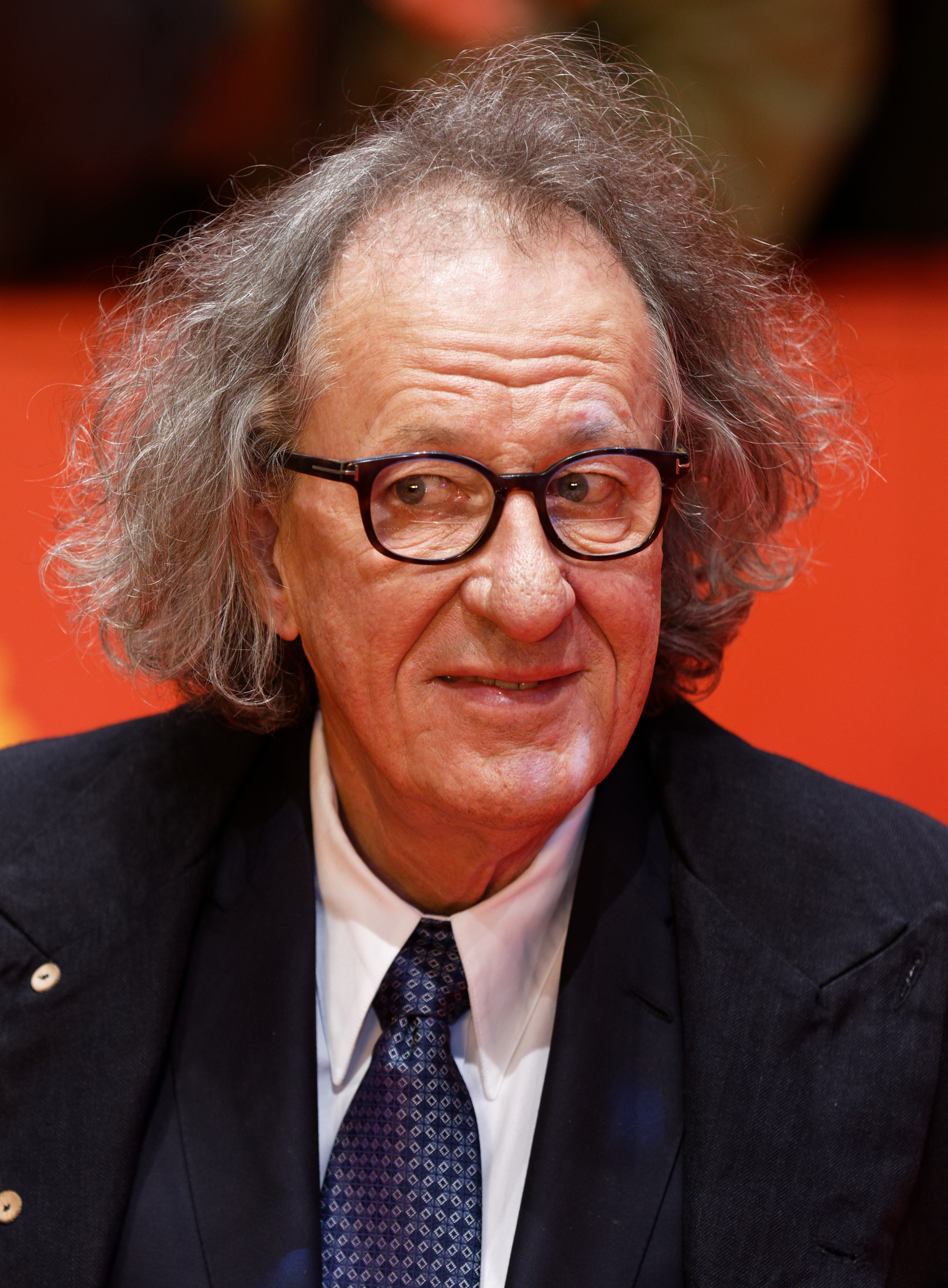
Geoffrey Rush, Best Actor winner

Frances McDormand, Best Actress winner

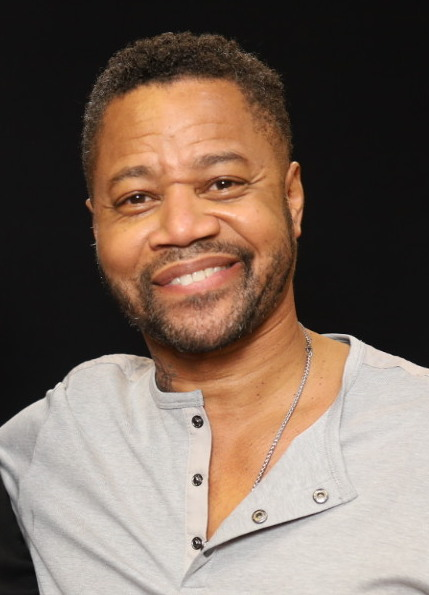
Cuba Gooding Jr., Best Supporting Actor winner

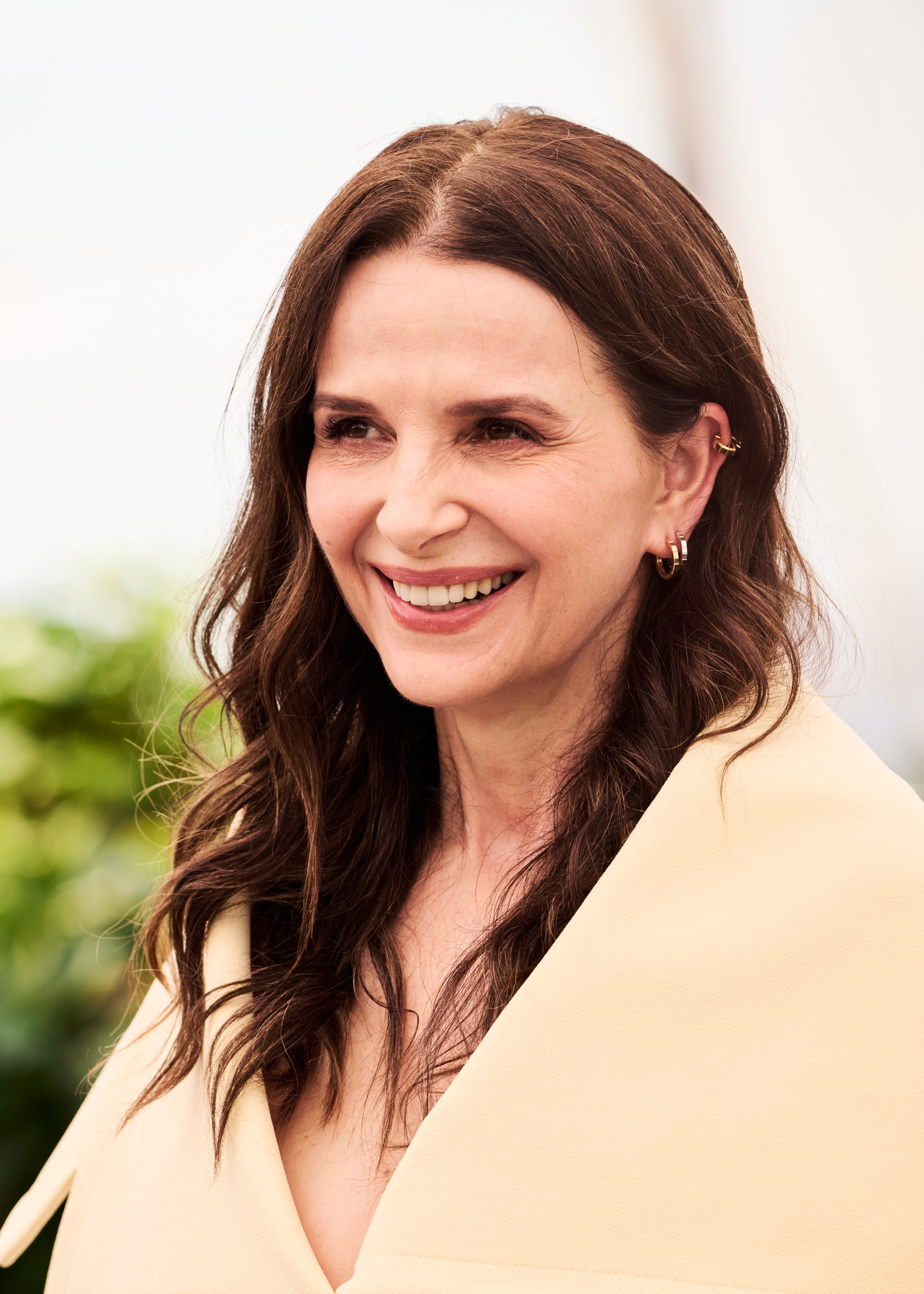
Juliette Binoche, Best Supporting Actress winner

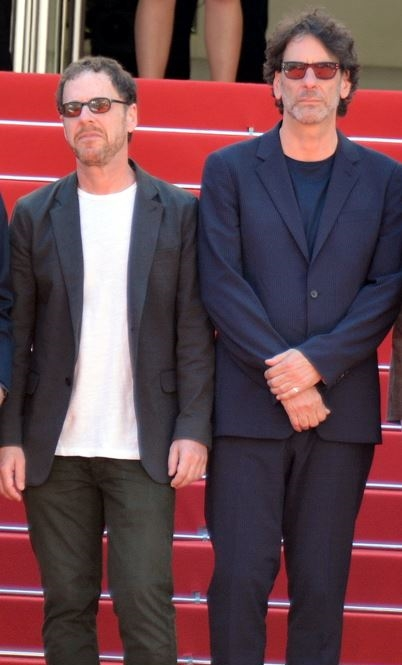
Coen brothers, Best Screenplay Written Directly for the Screen winners

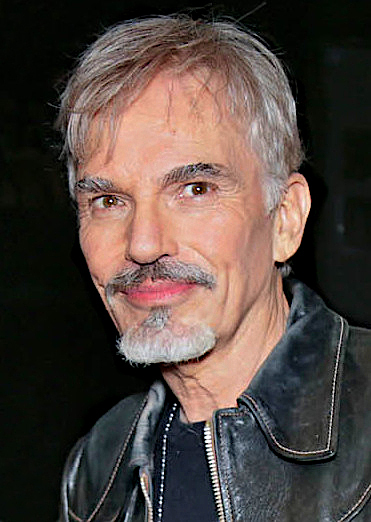
Billy Bob Thornton, Best Screenplay Based on Material Previously Produced or Published winner

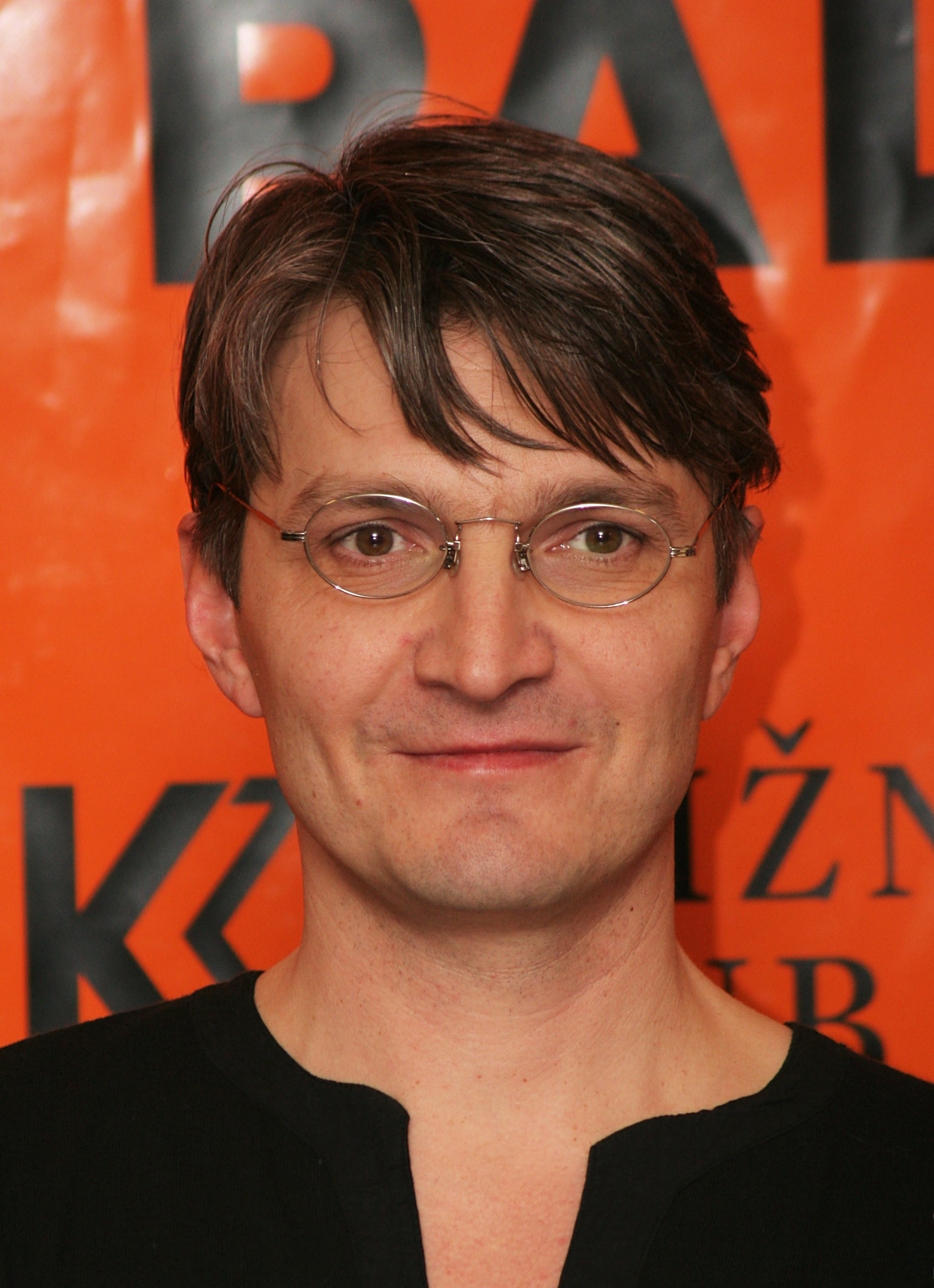
Jan Svěrák, Best Foreign Language Film winner

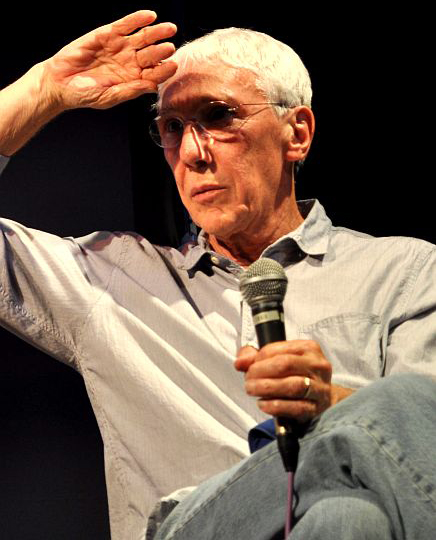
Leon Gast, Best Documentary Feature co-winner

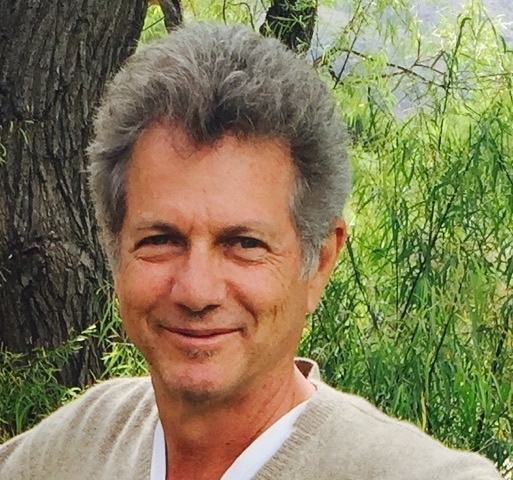
David Sonenberg, Best Documentary Feature co-winner

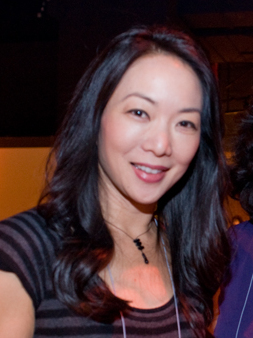
Jessica Yu, Best Documentary Short Subject winner

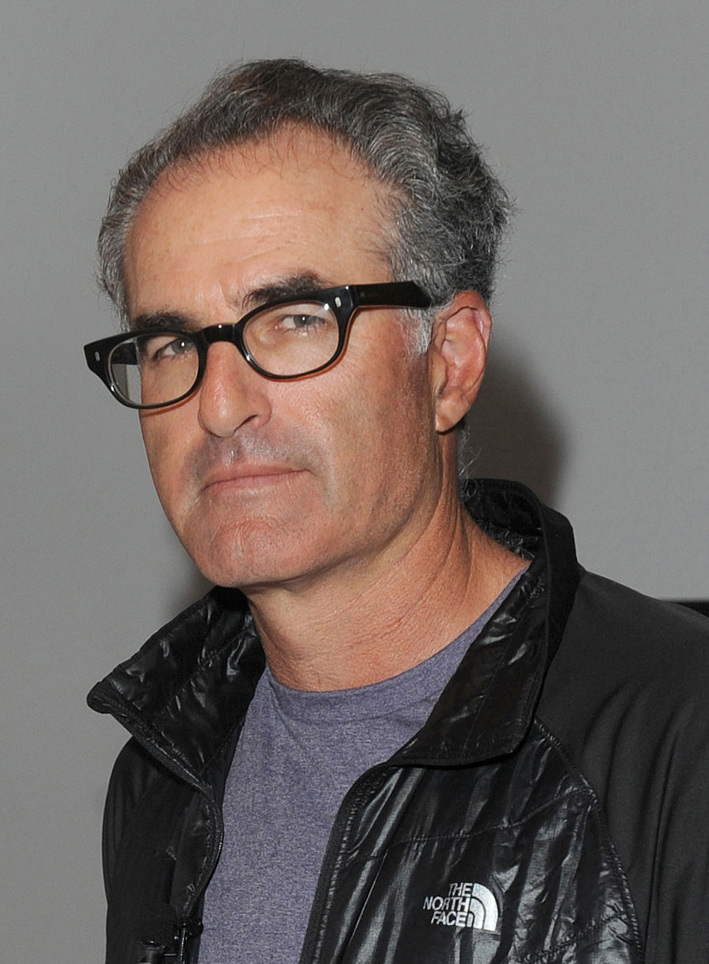
David Frankel, Best Live Action Short Film co-winner

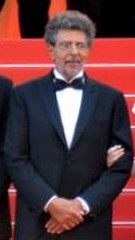
Gabriel Yared, Best Original Dramatic Score winner

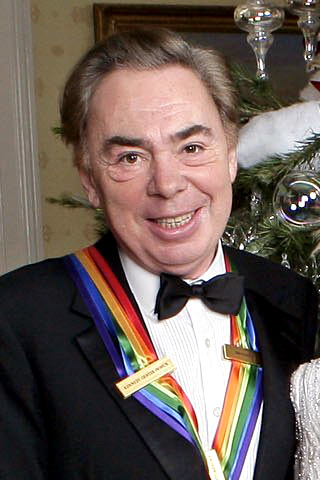
Andrew Lloyd Webber, Best Original Song co-winner

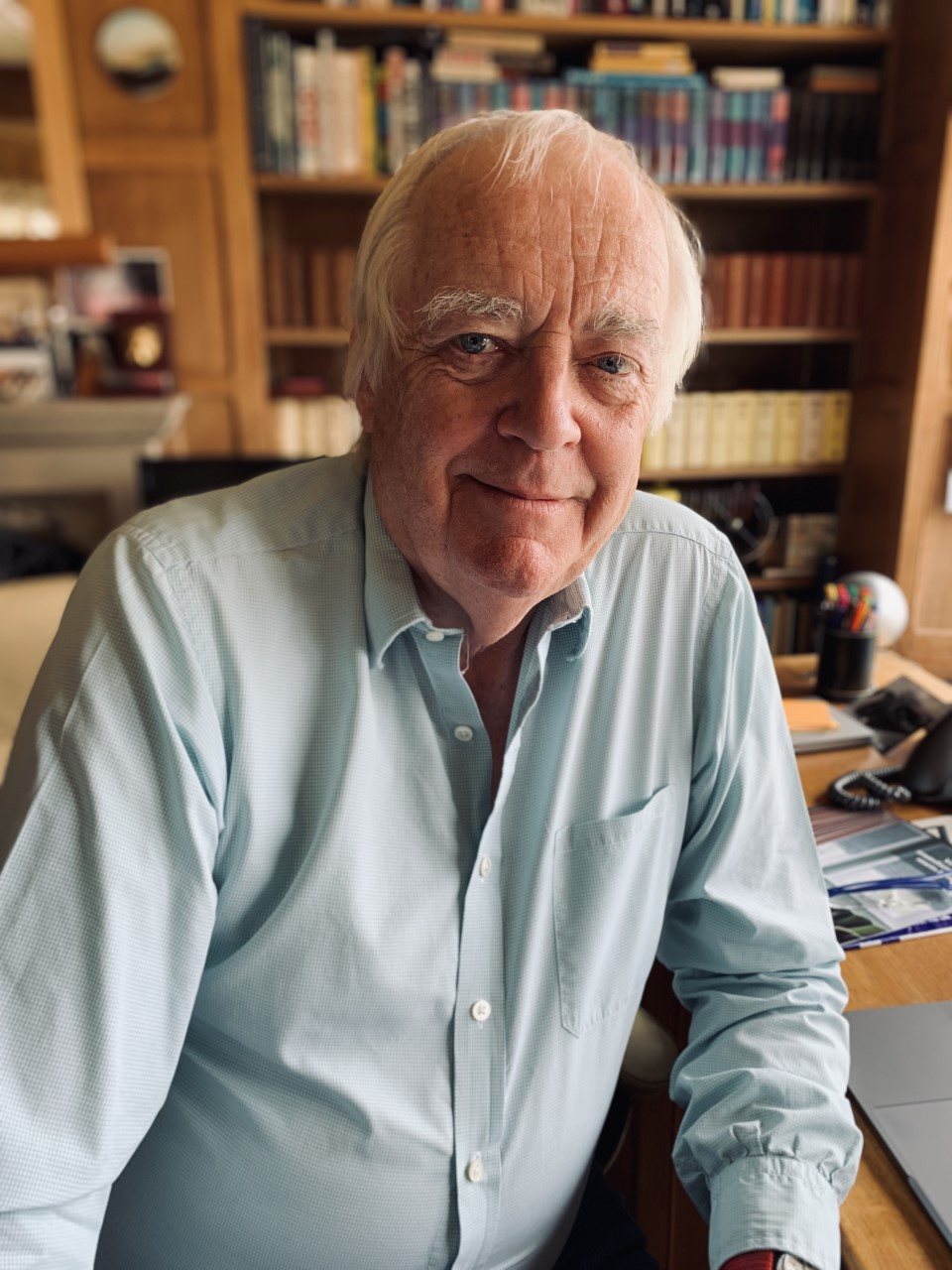
Tim Rice, Best Original Song co-winner

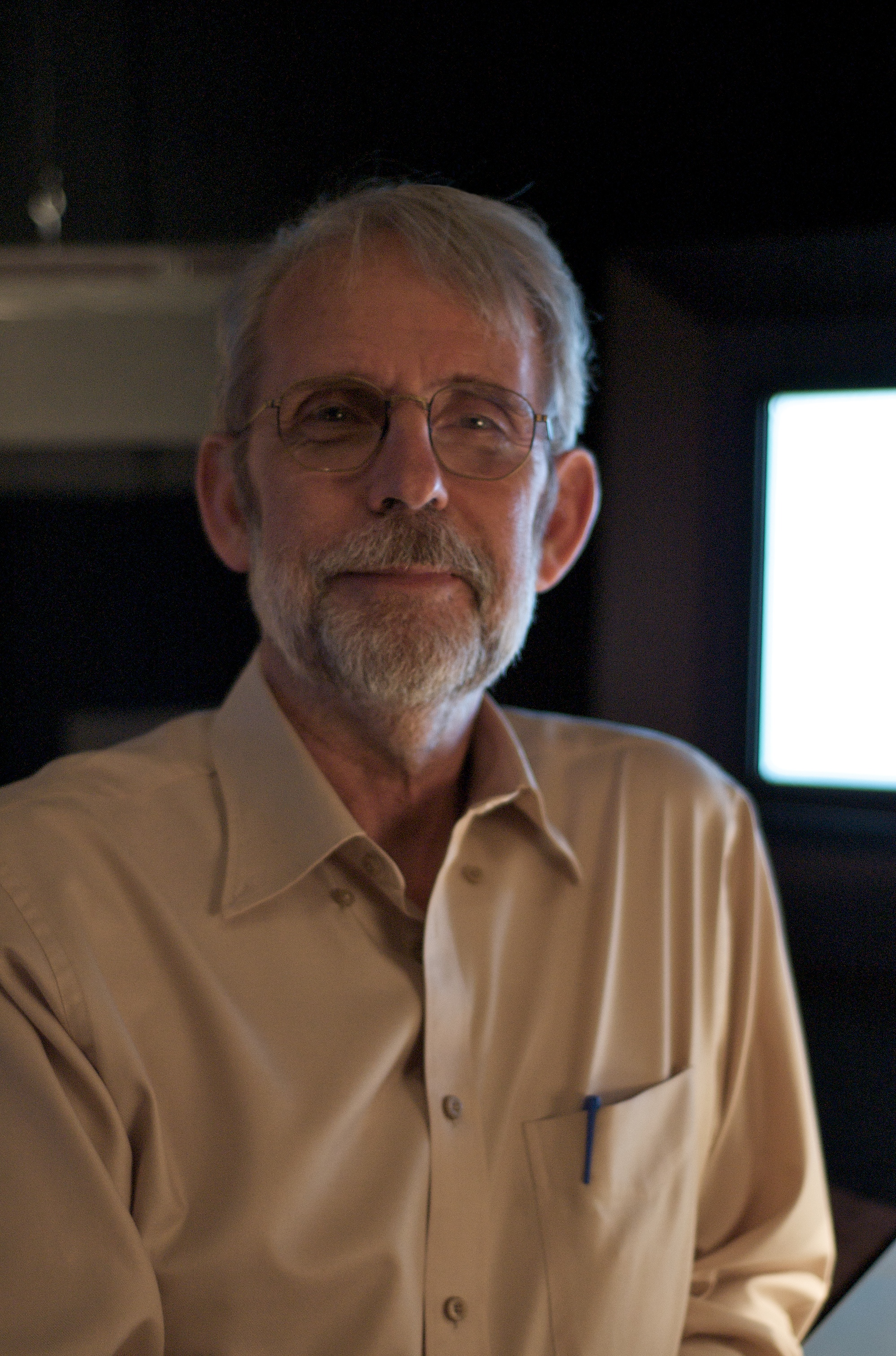
Walter Murch, Best Sound co-winner and Best Film Editing winner

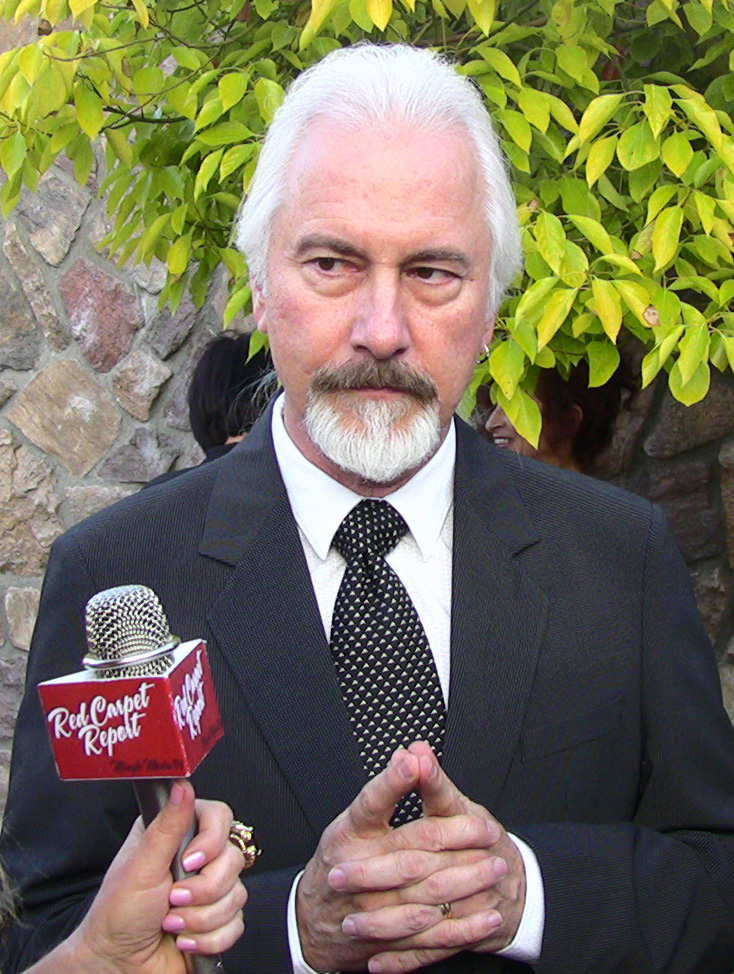
Rick Baker, Best Makeup co-winner

Winners are listed first and highlighted in boldface.

**Best Picture**: **The English Patient – Saul Zaentz, producer**; Fargo – Ethan Coen, producer; Jerry Maguire – James L. Brooks, Cameron Crowe, Laurence Mark and Richard Sakai, producers; Secrets & Lies – Simon Channing Williams, producer; Shine – Jane Scott, producer	**Best Directing**: **Anthony Minghella – The English Patient**; Joel Coen – Fargo; Miloš Forman – The People vs. Larry Flynt; Mike Leigh – Secrets & Lies; Scott Hicks – Shine
**Best Actor in a Leading Role**: **Geoffrey Rush – Shine as David Helfgott**; Tom Cruise – Jerry Maguire as Jerry Maguire; Ralph Fiennes – The English Patient as László Almásy; Woody Harrelson – The People vs. Larry Flynt as Larry Flynt; Billy Bob Thornton – Sling Blade as Karl Childers	**Best Actress in a Leading Role**: **Frances McDormand – Fargo as Marge Gunderson**; Brenda Blethyn – Secrets & Lies as Cynthia Rose Purley; Diane Keaton – Marvin's Room as Bessie; Kristin Scott Thomas – The English Patient as Katharine Clifton; Emily Watson – Breaking the Waves as Bess McNeill
**Best Actor in a Supporting Role**: **Cuba Gooding Jr. – Jerry Maguire as Rod Tidwell**; William H. Macy – Fargo as Jerry Lundegaard; Armin Mueller-Stahl – Shine as Peter Helfgott; Edward Norton – Primal Fear as Aaron Stampler; James Woods – Ghosts of Mississippi as Byron De La Beckwith	**Best Actress in a Supporting Role**: **Juliette Binoche – The English Patient as Hana**; Joan Allen – The Crucible as Elizabeth Proctor; Lauren Bacall – The Mirror Has Two Faces as Hannah Morgan; Barbara Hershey – The Portrait of a Lady as Madame Serena Merle; Marianne Jean-Baptiste – Secrets & Lies as Hortense Cumberbatch
**Best Writing (Screenplay Written Directly for the Screen)**: **Fargo – Ethan Coen and Joel Coen**; Jerry Maguire – Cameron Crowe; Lone Star – John Sayles; Secrets & Lies – Mike Leigh; Shine – Screenplay by Jan Sardi; Story by Scott Hicks	**Best Writing (Screenplay Based on Material Previously Produced or Published)**: **Sling Blade – Billy Bob Thornton based on his short film Some Folks Call It a Sling Blade**; The Crucible – Arthur Miller based on his play; The English Patient – Anthony Minghella based on the novel by Michael Ondaatje; Hamlet – Kenneth Branagh based on the play by William Shakespeare; Trainspotting – John Hodge based on the novel by Irvine Welsh
**Best Foreign Language Film**: **Kolya (Czech Republic) in Czech – Jan Svěrák, director**; A Chef in Love (Georgia) in French, Georgian, Russian – Nana Jorjadze, director; The Other Side of Sunday (Norway) in Norwegian – Berit Nesheim, director; Prisoner of the Mountains (Russia) in Russian – Sergei Bodrov, director; Ridicule (France) in French – Patrice Leconte, director	**Best Documentary (Feature)**: **When We Were Kings – Leon Gast and David Sonenberg**; The Line King: The Al Hirschfeld Story – Susan W. Dryfoos; Mandela – Jo Menell and Angus Gibson; Suzanne Farrell: Elusive Muse – Anne Belle and Deborah Dickson; Tell the Truth and Run: George Seldes and the American Press – Rick Goldsmith
**Best Documentary (Short Subject)**: **Breathing Lessons: The Life and Work of Mark O'Brien – Jessica Yu**; Cosmic Voyage – Jeffrey Marvin and Bayley Silleck; An Essay on Matisse – Perry Wolff; Special Effects: Anything Can Happen – Susanne Simpson and Ben Burtt; The Wild Bunch: An Album in Montage – Paul Seydor and Nick Redman	**Best Short Film (Live Action)**: **Dear Diary – David Frankel and Barry Jossen**; De tripas, corazón – Antonio Urrutia; Ernst & lyset – Kim Magnusson and Anders Thomas Jensen; Esposados – Juan Carlos Fresnadillo; Senza parole – Bernadette Carranza and Antonello De Leo
**Best Short Film (Animated)**: **Quest – Tyron Montgomery and Thomas Stellmach**; Canhead – Timothy Hittle and Chris Peterson; La Salla – Richard Condie; Wat's Pig – Peter Lord	**Best Music (Original Dramatic Score)**: **The English Patient – Gabriel Yared**; Hamlet – Patrick Doyle; Michael Collins – Elliot Goldenthal; Shine – David Hirschfelder; Sleepers – John Williams
**Best Music (Original Musical or Comedy Score)**: **Emma – Rachel Portman**; The First Wives Club – Marc Shaiman; The Hunchback of Notre Dame – Music by Alan Menken; Lyrics by Stephen Schwartz; Orchestral Score by Alan Menken; James and the Giant Peach – Randy Newman; The Preacher's Wife – Hans Zimmer	**Best Music (Original Song)**: **"You Must Love Me" from Evita – Music by Andrew Lloyd Webber; Lyrics by Tim Rice**; "Because You Loved Me" from Up Close and Personal – Music and Lyrics by Diane Warren; "For the First Time" from One Fine Day – Music and Lyrics by James Newton Howard, Jud J. Friedman and Allan Dennis Rich; "I Finally Found Someone" from The Mirror Has Two Faces – Music and Lyrics by Barbra Streisand, Marvin Hamlisch, Bryan Adams and Robert John "Mutt" Lange; "That Thing You Do!" from That Thing You Do! – Music and Lyrics by Adam Schlesinger
**Best Sound**: **The English Patient – Walter Murch, Mark Berger, David Parker and Chris Newman**; Evita – Andy Nelson, Anna Behlmer and Ken Weston; Independence Day – Chris Carpenter, Bill W. Benton, Bob Beemer and Jeff Wexler; The Rock – Kevin O'Connell, Greg P. Russell and Keith A. Wester; Twister – Steve Maslow, Gregg Landaker, Kevin O'Connell and Geoffrey Patterson	**Best Sound Effects Editing**: **The Ghost and the Darkness – Bruce Stambler**; Daylight – Richard L. Anderson and David A. Whittaker; Eraser – Alan Robert Murray and Bub Asman
**Best Art Direction**: **The English Patient – Art Direction: Stuart Craig; Set Decoration: Stephenie McMillan**; The Birdcage – Art Direction: Bo Welch; Set Decoration: Cheryl Carasik; Evita – Art Direction: Brian Morris; Set Decoration: Philippe Turlure; Hamlet – Art Direction and Set Decoration: Tim Harvey; Romeo + Juliet – Art Direction: Catherine Martin; Set Decoration: Brigitte Broch	**Best Cinematography**: **The English Patient – John Seale**; Evita – Darius Khondji; Fargo – Roger Deakins; Fly Away Home – Caleb Deschanel; Michael Collins – Chris Menges
**Best Makeup**: **The Nutty Professor – Rick Baker and David LeRoy Anderson**; Ghosts of Mississippi – Matthew W. Mungle and Deborah La Mia Denaver; Star Trek: First Contact – Michael Westmore, Scott Wheeler and Jake Garber	**Best Costume Design**: **The English Patient – Ann Roth**; Angels & Insects – Paul Brown; Emma – Ruth Myers; Hamlet – Alexandra Byrne; The Portrait of a Lady – Janet Patterson
**Best Film Editing**: **The English Patient – Walter Murch**; Evita – Gerry Hambling; Fargo – Roderick Jaynes; Jerry Maguire – Joe Hutshing; Shine – Pip Karmel	**Best Visual Effects**: **Independence Day – Volker Engel, Douglas Smith, Clay Pinney and Joe Viskocil**; Dragonheart – Scott Squires, Phil Tippett, James Straus and Kit West; Twister – Stefen Fangmeier, John Frazier, Habib Zargarpour and Henry LaBounta

=== Honorary Award ===
- To Michael Kidd in recognition of his services to the art of the dance in the art of the screen.

=== Irving G. Thalberg Memorial Award ===
- Saul Zaentz

=== Films with multiple nominations and awards ===
The following seventeen films received multiple nominations:

Nominations	Film
12	The English Patient
7	Fargo
7	Shine
5	Evita
5	Jerry Maguire
5	Secrets & Lies
4	Hamlet
2	The Crucible
2	Emma
2	Ghosts of Mississippi
2	Independence Day
2	Michael Collins
2	The Mirror Has Two Faces
2	The People vs. Larry Flynt
2	The Portrait of a Lady
2	Sling Blade
2	Twister

The following two films received multiple awards:

Awards	Film
9	The English Patient
2	Fargo

== Presenters and performers ==
The following individuals, in order of appearance, presented awards or performed musical numbers.

=== Presenters ===
Name(s)	Role
Randy Thomas	Announcer for the 69th annual Academy Awards
Arthur Hiller (AMPAS president)	Gave opening remarks welcoming guests to the awards ceremony
Mira Sorvino	Presenter of the award for Best Supporting Actor
Sandra Bullock	Presenter of the award for Best Art Direction
Steve Martin	Presenter of the film Jerry Maguire on the Best Picture segment
Juliette Binoche	Presenter of the award for Best Costume Design
Beavis; Butt-Head (Voiced by Mike Judge)	Presenters of the award Best Sound Effects Editing
Courtney Love	Presenter of the award for Best Makeup
Winona Ryder	Presenter of the "Togetherness and the Movies" montage
Kevin Spacey	Presenter of the award for Best Supporting Actress
Claire Danes	Introducer of the performance of Best Original Song nominee "That Thing You Do!"
Holly Hunter	Presenter of the film Fargo on the Best Picture segment
Chris Farley; David Spade	Presenters of the awards for Best Live Action Short Film and Best Animated Short Film
Julie Andrews	Presenter of the Academy Honorary Award to Michael Kidd
Helen Hunt	Presenter of the segment of the Academy Awards for Technical Achievement
Tommy Lee Jones; Will Smith	Presenters of the award Best Documentary Short Subject and Best Documentary Feature
Jim Carrey	Presenter of the award for Best Visual Effects
Chris O'Donnell	Presenter of the award for Best Sound
Nicole Kidman	Presenter of the Best Film editing montage and dance number and the award for Best Film Editing
Debbie Reynolds	Presenter of the award for Best Original Musical or Comedy Score
Gregory Hines	Presenter of the award for Best Original Dramatic Score
Glenn Close	Presenter of the film Shine on the Best Picture segment and introducer of the musical performance by David Helfgott
Tim Robbins	Presenter of the award for Best Cinematography
Salma Hayek	Introducer of the performance of Best Original Song nominee "For the First Time"
Michael Douglas	Presenter of the Irving G. Thalberg Memorial Award to Saul Zaentz
Kristin Scott Thomas; Jack Valenti	Presenter of the award Best Foreign Language Film
Sigourney Weaver	Presenter of the film The English Patient on the Best Picture segment
Jennifer Lopez	Introducer of the performance of Best Original Song nominee "Because You Loved Me"
Angela Bassett	Presenter of the "In Memoriam" tribute
Goldie Hawn; Diane Keaton; Bette Midler	Presenters of the award for Best Original Song
Kenneth Branagh	Presenter of the "Shakespeare and the Movies" montage
Jodie Foster	Presenter of the award for Best Screenplay Based on Material Previously Produced or Published and Best Screenplay Written Directly for the Screen
Andie MacDowell	Presenter of the film Secrets & Lies on the Best Picture segment
Nicolas Cage	Presenter of the award for Best Actress
Susan Sarandon	Presenter of the award for Best Actor
Mel Gibson	Presenter of the award for Best Director
Al Pacino	Presenter of the award for Best Picture

=== Performers ===
Name(s)	Role	Performed
Bill Conti	Musical arranger and conductor	Orchestral
Billy Crystal	Performer	Opening number: Secrets & Lies (to the tune of The Brady Bunch theme song), The English Patient (to the tune of "Wouldn't It Be Loverly" from My Fair Lady), Jerry Maguire (to the tune of "Victory March"), Shine (to the tune of "Flight of the Bumblebee"), and Fargo (to the tune of "My Kind of Town" from Robin and the 7 Hoods)
Madonna	Performer	"You Must Love Me" from Evita
The Wonders	Performers	"That Thing You Do!" from That Thing You Do!
Celine Dion; Arturo Sandoval	Performers	"I Finally Found Someone" from The Mirror Has Two Faces
Michael Flatley; Cast of Lord of the Dance	Performers	Best Film Editing montage
David Helfgott	Performer	"Flight of the Bumblebee" by Nikolai Rimsky-Korsakov
Kenny Loggins	Performer	"For the First Time" from One Fine Day
Celine Dion	Performer	"Because You Loved Me" from Up Close & Personal

== Ceremony information ==
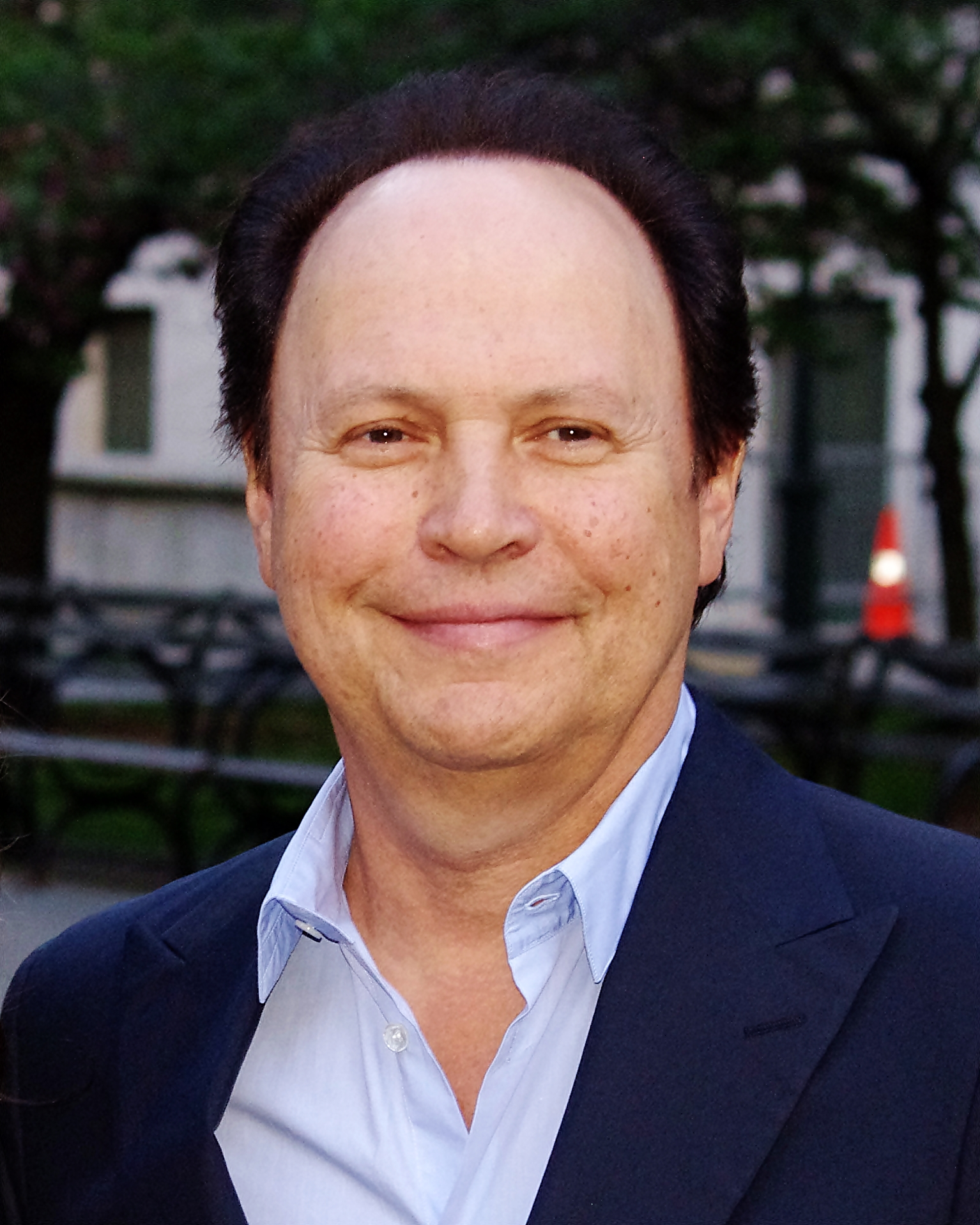
Billy Crystal hosted the 69th Academy Awards.

After taking a year off, Gil Cates was selected by AMPAS in November 1996 to oversee production of the ceremony for the seventh time. Immediately, he chose actor and comedian Billy Crystal to host the 1997 telecast, stating, "Billy is quick and agile and bright, and he plays the unexpected events of the live telecast like a Stradivarius. He's become the standard against which all other hosting performances are measured." Crystal expressed his excitement on hosting the ceremony for the fifth time joking, "Once Barry Scheck turned it down, I had a feeling they'd come to me." Furthermore, he set up a website with the address www.whyistheshowsolong.com asking the public to send in jokes that would eventually be used during the gala.

As with previous ceremonies he produced, Cates centered the show around a theme. This year, he christened the show with the theme "Togetherness of Moviegoing" commenting, "The thing that's kind of wonderful about movies is that you watch them with other people. The only other areas where you do that, when you think about it, are religion and sports." He concluded by noting that the movie theater is "a wonderful place where you come together to laugh, to cry." In tandem with the theme, actress Winona Ryder presented a montage featuring film clips from Casablanca (1942), Matinee (1993), and A Streetcar Named Desire (1951) depicting audiences inside a movie theater.

Several other people and elements were also involved with the production of the ceremony. Documentary filmmaker Arnold Schwartzman designed the official ceremony poster featuring the titles of the previous 68 Best Picture winners superimposed in the shape of an Oscar statuette. Film composer and musician Bill Conti served as musical director of the ceremony. Choreographer Otis Sallid supervised the "That Thing You Do!" musical number. Michael Flatley and the cast of the musical Lord of the Dance performed a dance number during a montage saluting the art of Film Editors. Pianist David Helfgott, whom Best Actor winner Geoffrey Rush portrayed in the film Shine, played a rendition of "Flight of the Bumblebee" by Nikolai Rimsky-Korsakov during the telecast.

Natalie Cole was initially scheduled to sing the nominated song "I Finally Found Someone" from The Mirror Has Two Faces on the show after its songwriter and original performer Barbra Streisand declined to do so. However, after Cole contracted the flu, she withdrew for her performance duties and was eventually replaced by Celine Dion who also sang "Because You Loved Me" later in the broadcast.

=== Box office performance of nominees ===
At the time of the nominations announcement on February 11, the combined gross of the five Best Picture nominees at the US box office was $209 million, with an average of $41.9 million per film. Jerry Maguire was the highest earner among the Best Picture nominees with $121.5 million in domestic box office receipts. The film was followed by The English Patient ($42.3 million), Shine ($16.1 million), Fargo ($24 million) and finally Secrets & Lies ($5.9 million).

Of the top 50 grossing movies of the year, 37 nominations went to 17 films on the list. Only Jerry Maguire (9th), Primal Fear (27th) and The English Patient (35th) were nominated for directing, acting, screenwriting or Best Picture. The other top 50 box office hits that earned nominations were Independence Day (1st), Twister (2nd), The Rock (4th), The Nutty Professor (7th), The Birdcage (8th), Eraser (13th), The Hunchback of Notre Dame (14th), Star Trek: First Contact (15th), Sleepers (29th), Dragonheart (30th), The Preacher's Wife (32nd), Evita (36th), The Ghost and the Darkness (39th), and Daylight (48th).

=== Critical response ===
The show received a mixed reception from media publications. Some media outlets were more critical of the show. Television critic Joanne Ostrow of The Denver Post commented "Billy Crystal had a smashing first 10 minutes at the Oscars last night," but she later went on to say that inevitable sweep by The English Patient created a dull atmosphere that even sucked the energy out of Crystal's performance. Columnist Brian Lowry wrote in Los Angeles Times, "This year the mystery far outweighed the magic, in a telecast that proved less compelling--indeed, during stretches more downright dull--than recent predecessors." He also quipped that even though Crystal was mildly entertaining, some of his jokes "felt a bit forced and stale." The Star-Ledger's Alan Sepinwall noted, "Crystal was a bundle of energy, but his jokes had less zing than in the past." He also observed that the Film Editing dance number and "That Thing You Do" musical performance were hideously bloated.

Other media outlets received the broadcast more positively. Film critic Carrie Rickey of The Philadelphia Inquirer wrote, "Crystal sparkled as the host of the annual awards at the Shrine Auditorium." She also noted, "The mood of the evening was elegant and gracious." Chicago Tribune columnist Steve Johnson commented, "Billy Crystal returned as host of the Academy Awards on Monday night and proved that even if mainline Hollywood is nearly shut out in the trophy dispensing, one of its representatives can at least make a television broadcast entertaining." Television critic Kinney Littlefield of the Orange County Register quipped, "In his fifth stint as host, Crystal served up the sense of inclusive, insider movie community that had been missing during his three-year absence." In addition, she observed, "For most of the evening, Oscar seemed newly energized, upbeat and full of splashy fun."

=== Ratings and reception ===
The American telecast on ABC drew in an average of 40.08 million people over its length, which was a 9% decrease from the previous year's ceremony. An estimated 73.83 million total viewers watched all or part of the awards. The show also drew lower Nielsen ratings compared to the previous ceremony with 27.49% of households watching over a 46.31 share. In addition, it also drew a lower 18–49 demo rating with a 16.55 rating over a 34.32 share among viewers in that demographic. It was the least watched ceremony in a decade and the lowest rated telecast since the 58th awards gala held in 1986.

In July 1997, the ceremony presentation received seven nominations at the 49th Primetime Emmy Awards. Two months later, the ceremony won one of those nominations for Outstanding Sound Mixing for a Variety or Music Series or Special (Edward J. Greene, Tom Vicari, Robert Douglass).

== "In Memoriam" ==
The annual "In Memoriam" tribute, presented by actress Angela Bassett, honored the following people to the score of Dr. Jekyll and Ms. Hyde (1995):

- Jo Van Fleet
- Tupac Shakur
- Brigitte Helm
- Dorothy Lamour
- Stirling Silliphant – Writer
- Saul Bass – Designer
- Steve Tesich – Writer
- Juliet Prowse
- Murray Spivack – Sound
- Joseph Biroc – Cinematographer
- Howard E. Rollins Jr.
- Jack Weston
- Krzysztof Kieślowski – Director
- Fred Zinnemann – Director
- Ben Johnson
- Gene Nelson
- Edward C. Carfagno – Art Director
- Joanne Dru
- John Alton – Cinematographer
- Greer Garson
- Albert R. 'Cubby' Broccoli – Producer
- Lew Ayres
- Pandro S. Berman – Producer
- Sheldon Leonard
- Claudette Colbert
- Marcello Mastroianni

== See also ==
- List of submissions to the 69th Academy Awards for Best Foreign Language Film

== Bibliography ==
- Bona, Damien (2002), Inside Oscar 2, New York, United States: Ballantine Books, ISBN 0-345-44970-3
- Pond, Steve (2005), The Big Show: High Times and Dirty Dealings Backstage at the Academy Awards, New York, United States: Faber and Faber, ISBN 0-571-21193-3
