= Darius Khondji =

Iranian-French cinematographer

- داریوش خنجی
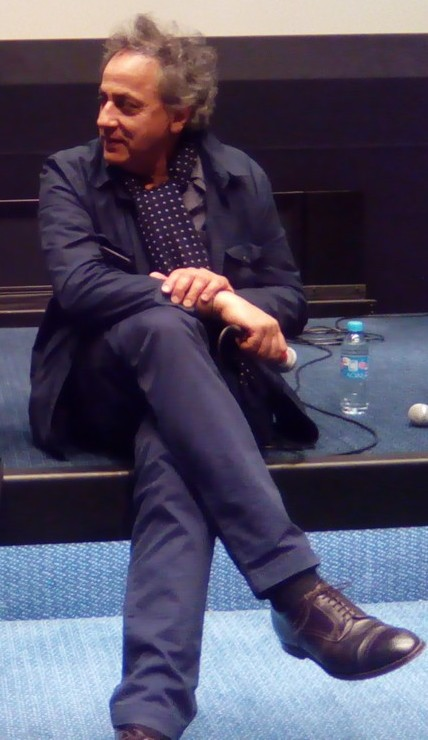
- Khondji in 2017
- Born: 21 October 1955 (age 71); Tehran, Iran
- Education: UCLA; New York University; International Center for Photography
- Years active: 1984–present
- Spouse: Marianne Chemetov
- Children: 3
- Relatives: Paul Chemetov (father-in-law)

Darius Khondji AFC, ASC (Persian: داریوش خنجی; born 21 October 1955) is an Iranian-French cinematographer. He has been nominated three times for the Academy Award for Best Cinematography, twice for the BAFTA Award for Best Cinematography, and other three at the César Awards.

== Early life and education ==
Khondji was born in Tehran, Iran, to an Iranian father and a French mother. At an early age, his family moved to France. He became interested in film early on and made Super-8 films in his teens. Later, he moved to the United States to study at UCLA and then majored in film at New York University and the International Center of Photography. Two teachers influenced his decision to become a cinematographer: Jonas Mekas and Haig P. Manoogian (Martin Scorsese's film teacher). He realized that "all I wanted to do was shoot the other students' films. I was concerned with the power of the image and much less with story."

== Career ==
After his time in the United States, Khondji returned to France in 1981 and worked as an assistant for cinematographers like Bruno Nuytten, Martin Schafer and Pascal Marti. He also worked as a lighting director on music videos and commercials.

His second feature film was Le tresor des Iles Chiennes (1991), a low-budget, black-and-white, post-atomic adventure film. His work on this movie led the Cahiers du cinéma to publish a rare interview with a cinematographer. It was on this film that he demonstrated an affinity for Cinemascope. He remarked in an interview, "I think it's the most beautiful format to frame. One can become absorbed in the faces when they're framed in 'Scope." His subsequent work on Delicatessen established his international reputation and earned him a Cesar nomination for Best Cinematography. One of his highest profile films was Seven which he got based on a Nike ad he shot with David Fincher and his work on Delicatessen. His work on Evita was nominated for an Oscar for the Best Cinematography.

Darius worked on three European-shot films by Woody Allen: Midnight in Paris (2011), To Rome with Love (2012) and Magic in the Moonlight (2014). In 2012, Khondji shot the Palme d'Or-winning film Amour, which also won the Academy Award for Best Foreign Language Film and was nominated for Best Picture.

Khondji worked with Paul Thomas Anderson on the short film Anima for the Thom Yorke album of the same name, released on Netflix and in select IMAX theaters in 2019.

== Influences ==
Khondji cites Gregg Toland as his favorite cinematographer. "I particularly admire his work on John Ford's The Grapes of Wrath." He also greatly admires James Wong Howe's work, in particular Hud. Khondji has said that his dream project would be "a 16mm black and white film of On the Road!"

== Personal life ==
Khondji is married to Marianne Chemetov, a daughter of the French architect Paul Chemetov, and has three children.

== Filmography ==
=== Short films ===
Year	Title	Director	Notes
2013	Illusions & Mirrors	Shirin Neshat	
2013	Castello Cavalcanti	Wes Anderson	

=== Feature films ===
Year	Title	Director	Notes
1989	Embrasse-moi	Michèle Rosier	
1990	Le trésor des îles chiennes	F. J. Ossang	
1991	Delicatessen	Marc Caro; Jean-Pierre Jeunet	
1992	Prague	Ian Sellar	
1993	Shadow of a Doubt	Aline Issermann	
1995	The City of Lost Children	Marc Caro; Jean-Pierre Jeunet	
1995	Marie-Louise ou la permission	Manuel Flèche	with Florent Montcouquiol
1995	Seven	David Fincher	
1996	Stealing Beauty	Bernardo Bertolucci	
1996	Evita	Alan Parker	
1997	Alien Resurrection	Jean-Pierre Jeunet	
1999	In Dreams	Neil Jordan	
1999	The Ninth Gate	Roman Polanski	
2000	The Beach	Danny Boyle	
2002	Panic Room	David Fincher	with Conrad W. Hall
2003	Anything Else	Woody Allen	
2004	Wimbledon	Richard Loncraine	
2005	The Interpreter	Sydney Pollack	
2006	Zidane: A 21st Century Portrait	Douglas Gordon; Philippe Parreno	Documentary film
2007	My Blueberry Nights	Wong Kar-wai	with Pun-Leung Kwan
2007	Funny Games	Michael Haneke	
2008	The Ruins	Carter Smith	
2009	Chéri	Stephen Frears	
2011	Midnight in Paris	Woody Allen	
2012	To Rome with Love	Woody Allen	
2012	Amour	Michael Haneke	
2013	The Immigrant	James Gray	
2014	Magic in the Moonlight	Woody Allen	
2015	Irrational Man	Woody Allen	
2016	The Lost City of Z	James Gray	
2017	Okja	Bong Joon-ho	
2019	Uncut Gems	Safdie brothers	
2022	Armageddon Time	James Gray	
2022	Bardo, False Chronicle of a Handful of Truths	Alejandro González Iñárritu	
2025	Mickey 17	Bong Joon-ho	
2025	Eddington	Ari Aster	
2025	Marty Supreme	Josh Safdie	

=== Television ===
Year	Title	Director	Notes
2019	Too Old to Die Young	Nicolas Winding Refn	Miniseries; 7 episodes
2020	Strasbourg 1518	Jonathan Glazer	TV short
2021	Lisey's Story	Pablo Larraín	Miniseries; 8 episodes

=== Music videos ===
Year	Title	Artist	Director
1993	"Fever"	Madonna	Stéphane Sednaoui
1996	"You Must Love Me"	Madonna	Alan Parker
1996	"Don't Cry for Me Argentina"	Madonna	Alan Parker
1998	"Frozen"	Madonna	Chris Cunningham
1999	"Afrika Shox"	Leftfield	Chris Cunningham
2000	"Dirge"	Death in Vegas	Richard Fearless; Richard Fenwick
2001	"Boiler"	Limp Bizkit	Fred Durst; Dave Meyers
2008	"Miles Away"	Madonna	Nathan Rissman
2010	Sticky & Sweet Tour	Madonna	Nathan Rissman; Steven Klein; Tom Munro; Nick Wickham
2011	"Marry the Night"	Lady Gaga	
2014	"Everything"	Neneh Cherry	Jean-Baptiste Mondino
2017	"Look What You Made Me Do"	Taylor Swift	Joseph Kahn
2018	"The Icon Project"	Eminem	Marissa Velez
2019	"Marcy Me"	Jay-Z	Safdie brothers

== Exhibitions ==
- 2010: Discovery award laureate and exhibition at Les Rencontres d'Arles festival, France.

== Awards and nominations ==
Major awards

Year	Award	Category	Title	Result
1996	Academy Awards	Best Cinematography	Evita	Nominated
2022	Academy Awards	Best Cinematography	Bardo	Nominated
2025	Academy Awards	Best Cinematography	Marty Supreme	Nominated
1996	British Academy Film Awards	Best Cinematography	Evita	Nominated
2025	British Academy Film Awards	Best Cinematography	Marty Supreme	Nominated
1995	American Society of Cinematographers	Outstanding Cinematography	Seven	Nominated
1996	American Society of Cinematographers	Outstanding Cinematography	Evita	Nominated
2013	American Society of Cinematographers	Spotlight Award	The Immigrant	Nominated
2025	American Society of Cinematographers	Outstanding Cinematography	Marty Supreme	Nominated
1995	British Society of Cinematographers	Best Cinematography	Seven	Nominated
1996	British Society of Cinematographers	Best Cinematography	Evita	Nominated
2011	British Society of Cinematographers	Best Cinematography	Midnight in Paris	Nominated
2025	British Society of Cinematographers	Best Cinematography	Marty Supreme	Nominated
1991	César Awards	Best Cinematography	Delicatessen	Nominated
1995	César Awards	Best Cinematography	The City of Lost Children	Nominated
2012	César Awards	Best Cinematography	Amour	Nominated
1995	Chicago Film Critics Association	Best Cinematography	Seven	Won
1996	Chicago Film Critics Association	Best Cinematography	Evita	Nominated
2022	Chicago Film Critics Association	Best Cinematography	Bardo	Nominated
2011	Independent Spirit Awards	Best Cinematography	Midnight in Paris	Nominated
2013	Independent Spirit Awards	Best Cinematography	The Immigrant	Nominated

Other awards

Year	Award	Category	Title	Result
1995	Los Angeles Film Critics Association	Best Cinematography	Se7en	Nominated
1996	Globo d'oro	Best Cinematography	Stealing Beauty	Won
1996	Camerimage	Golden Frog	Stealing Beauty	Nominated
1996	David di Donatello	Best Cinematography	Stealing Beauty	Nominated
2012	European Film Awards	Best Cinematographer	Amour	Nominated
2013	New York Film Critics Circle Awards	Best Cinematographer	The Immigrant	Won
2013	National Society of Film Critics	Best Cinematography	The Immigrant	Nominated
2014	Lumière Awards	Best Cinematography	Magic in the Moonlight	Nominated
2016	San Diego Film Critics Society	Best Cinematography	The Lost City of Z	Nominated
2016	London Film Critics' Circle	Technical Achievement of the Year	The Lost City of Z	Nominated
