= An Essay on Matisse =

1996 film

- Directed by: Perry Wolff
- Produced by: Kenneth Mandel
- Edited by: Andrew Morreale
- Production company: Great Projects Film Company
- Distributed by: PBS
- Release date: 1996
- Country: United States
- Language: English

An Essay on Matisse is a 1996 American short documentary film on artist Henri Matisse directed by Perry Wolff. It was nominated for an Academy Award for Best Documentary Short.
