= Philippe Turlure =

American set decorator

- Occupation: Set decorator

Philippe Turlure is an American set decorator. He was nominated for an Academy Award in the category Best Production Design for the film Evita.

== Selected filmography ==
- Evita (1996; co-nominated with Brian Morris)
