= Ken Weston =

English sound engineer

- Born: Kenneth William Weston; 30 May 1947; Finsbury Park, London, England
- Died: 13 April 2001 (aged 53); Wimbledon, Surrey, England
- Occupation: Sound engineer
- Years active: 1974–2001

Ken Weston (30 May 1947 – 13 April 2001) was an English sound engineer. He won an Academy Award for Best Sound and was nominated for another in the same category. He worked on more than 50 films between 1974 and 2001.

Won

- Gladiator (2000)

Nominated

- Evita (1996)
