= Brian Morris (art director) =

British production designer (born 1939)

- Born: 1939 (age 86–87); Lancashire, England, UK
- Occupation: Production designer
- Years active: 1973-present

Brian Morris (born 1939) is a British production designer known for films such as Pirates of the Caribbean: The Curse of the Black Pearl, Evita and The Insider.

He was nominated at the 69th Academy Awards in the category of Best Art Direction for his work on the film Evita. He shared his nomination with Philippe Turlure.

He has worked on over 30 films since 1973.
