= The English Patient (disambiguation) =

The English Patient is a 1992 novel by Michael Ondaatje.

The English Patient may also refer to:

- The English Patient (film), a 1996 adaptation of the novel
  - The English Patient (soundtrack), a soundtrack album from the film
- "The English Patient" (Seinfeld), an episode of the TV series Seinfeld
