= 1st Golden Satellite Awards =

Awards ceremony for film and television

- Date: January 15, 1997

Highlights
- Best drama film: Fargo
- Best comedy/musical film: Evita
- Best television drama: The X-Files
- Best television musical/comedy: The Larry Sanders Show
- Best director: Joel Coen for Fargo

The 1st Golden Satellite Awards, given by the International Press Academy, were awarded on January 15, 1997. The ceremony was hosted by Stacy Keach.

== Special achievement awards ==
Mary Pickford Award (for outstanding contribution to the entertainment industry) – Rod Steiger

Outstanding Contribution to New Media – Bill Gates

Outstanding New Talent – Arie Verveen

== Motion picture winners and nominees ==
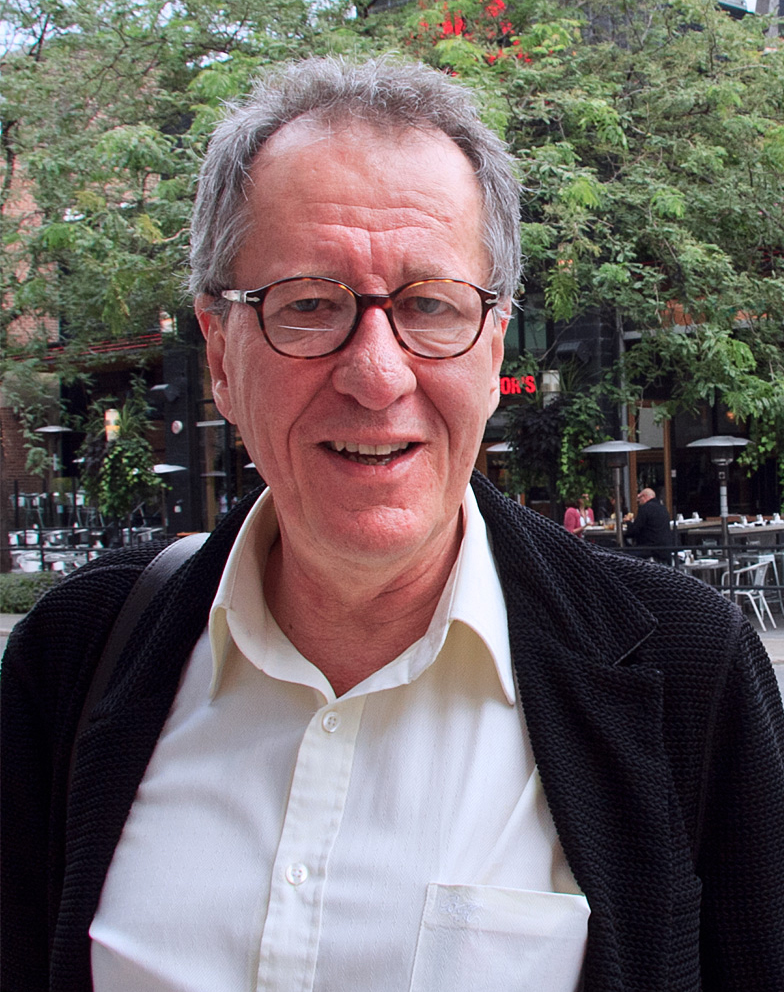
Geoffrey Rush – Best Actor in a Motion Picture, Drama

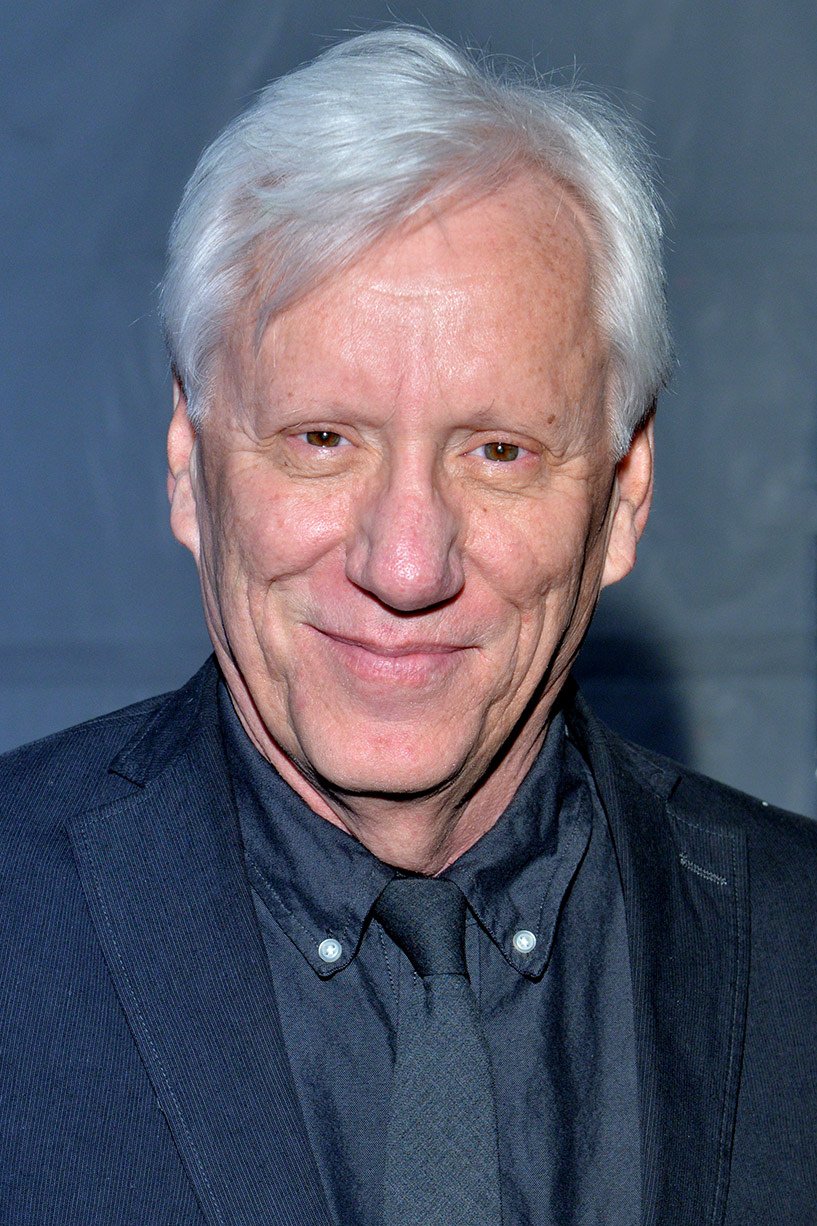
James Woods – Best Actor in a Motion Picture, Drama

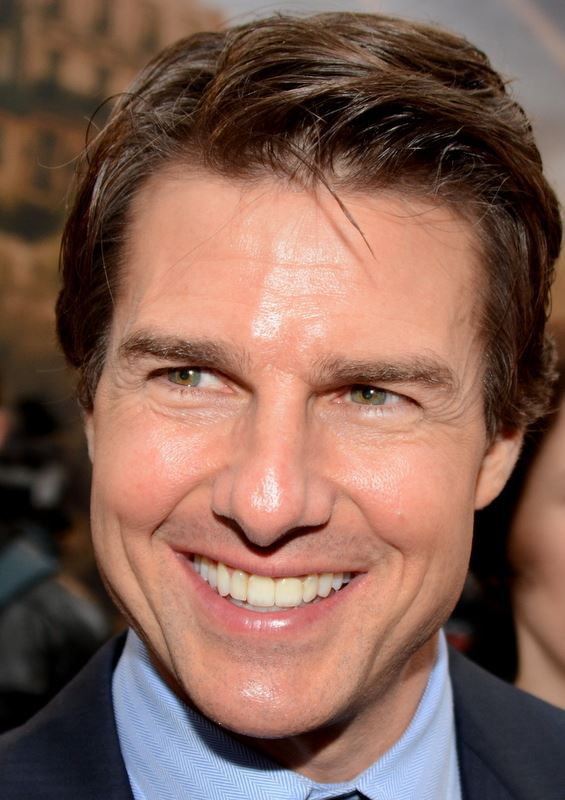
Tom Cruise – Best Actor in a Motion Picture, Comedy or Musical

Frances McDormand – Best Actress in a Motion Picture, Drama

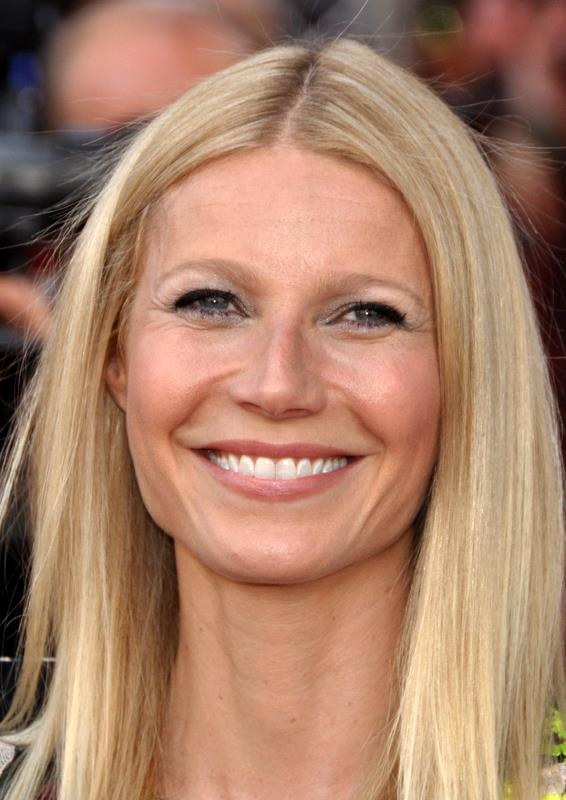
Gwyneth Paltrow – Best Actress in a Motion Picture, Comedy or Musical

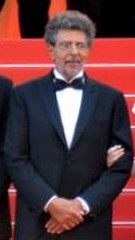
Gabriel Yared – Best Original Score

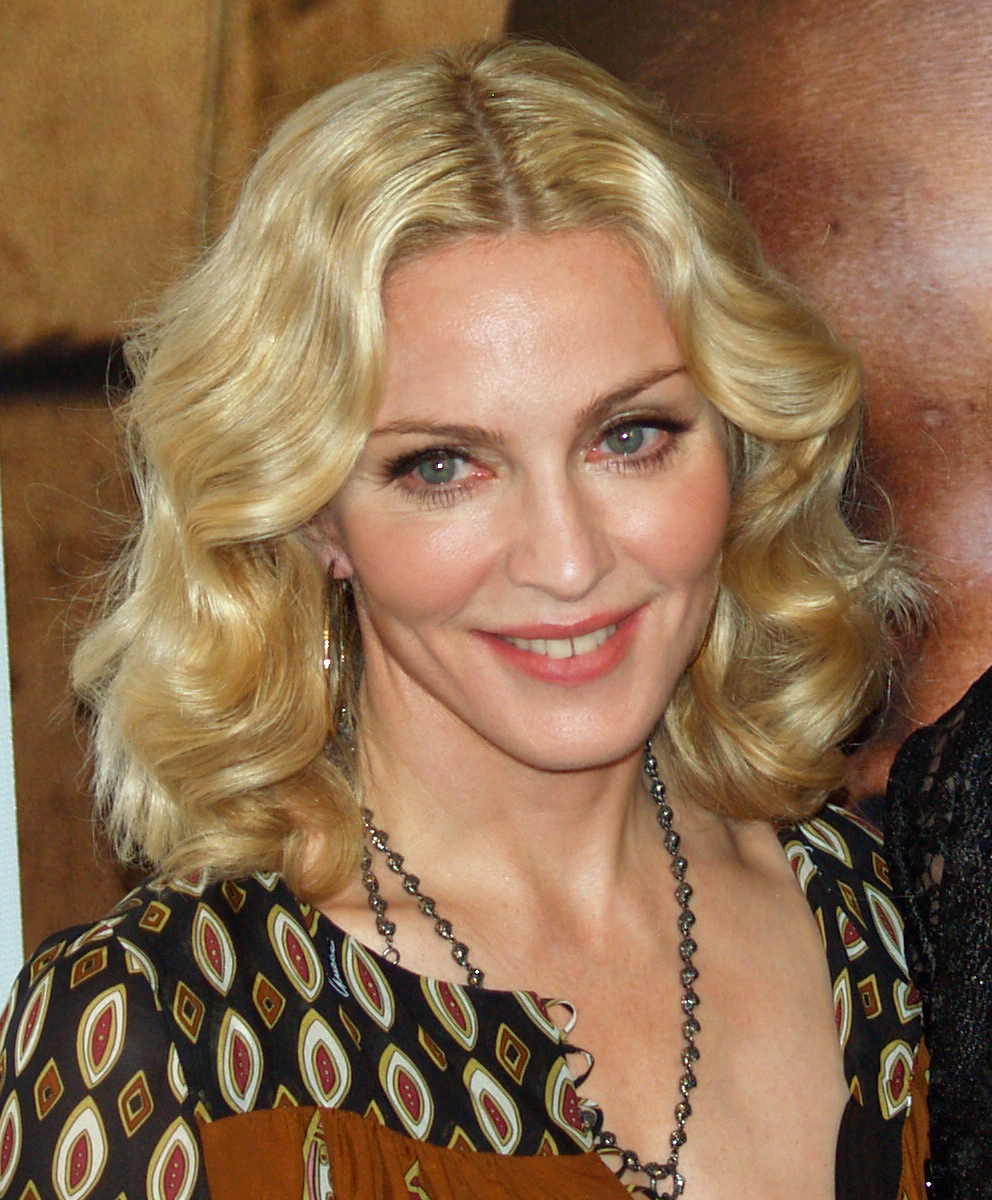
Madonna – Best Original Song: "You Must Love Me"

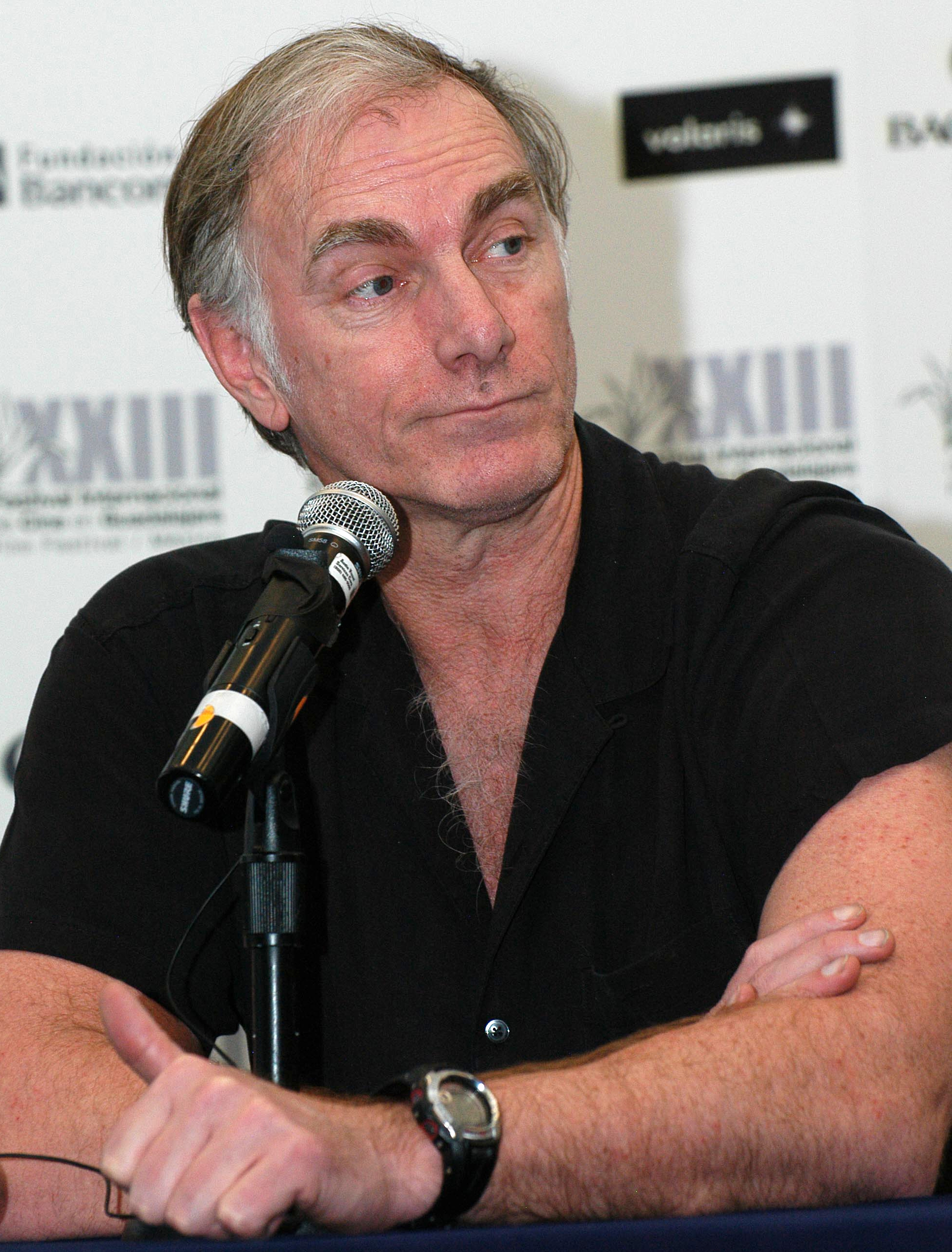
John Sayles – Best Screenplay, Original

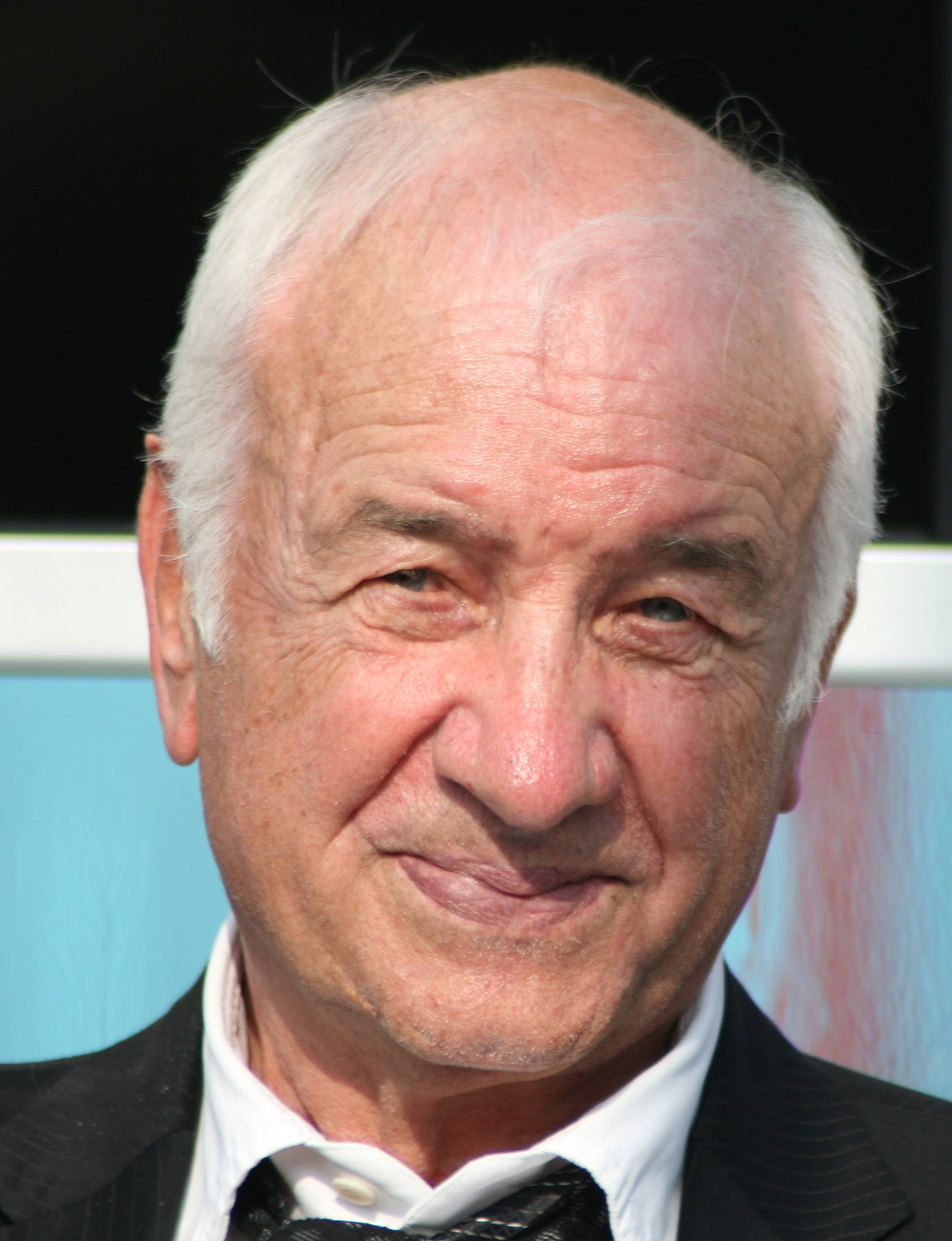
Armin Mueller Stahl – Best Supporting Actor in a Motion Picture, Drama

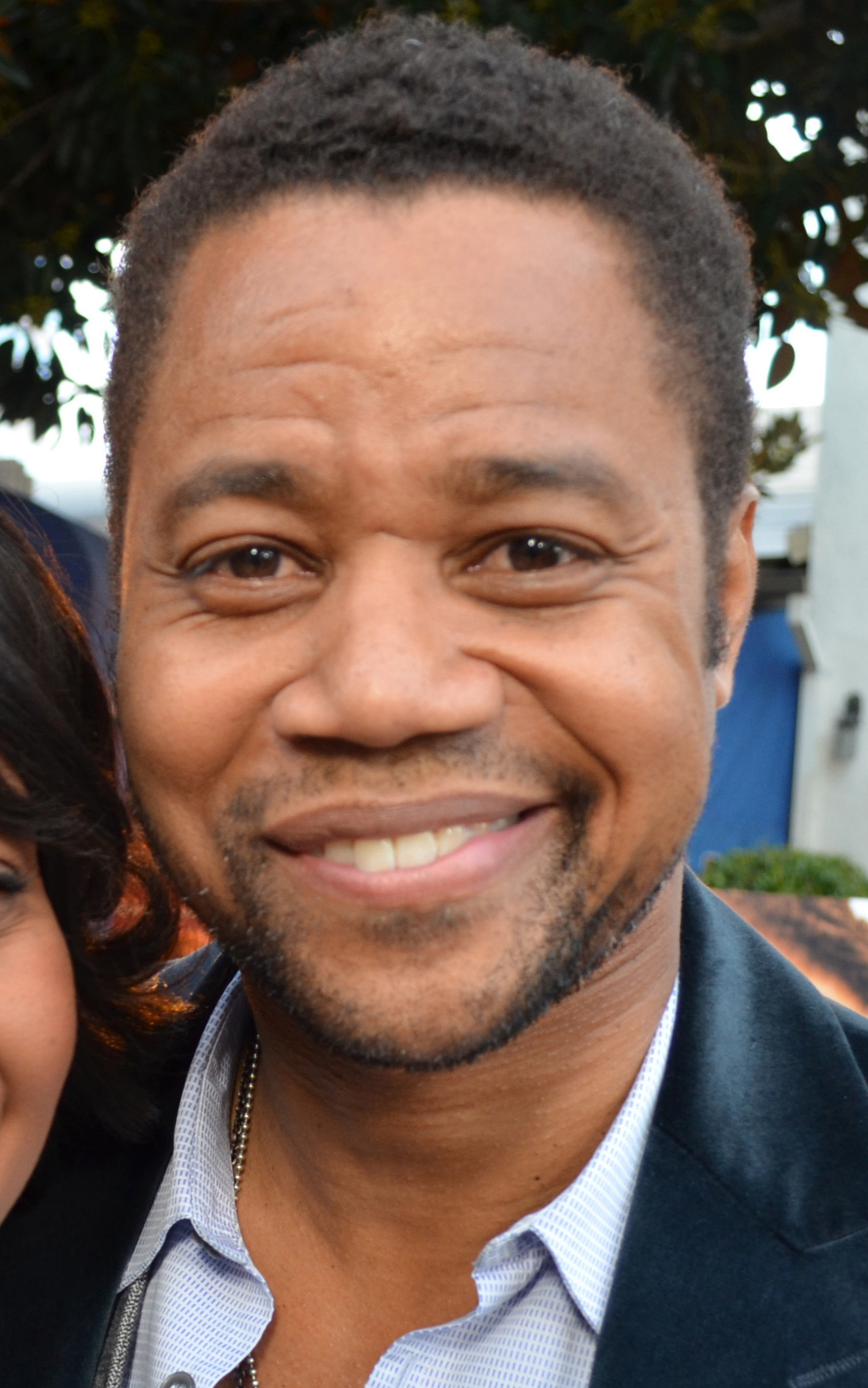
Cuba Gooding Jr. – Best Supporting Actor in a Motion Picture, Comedy or Musical

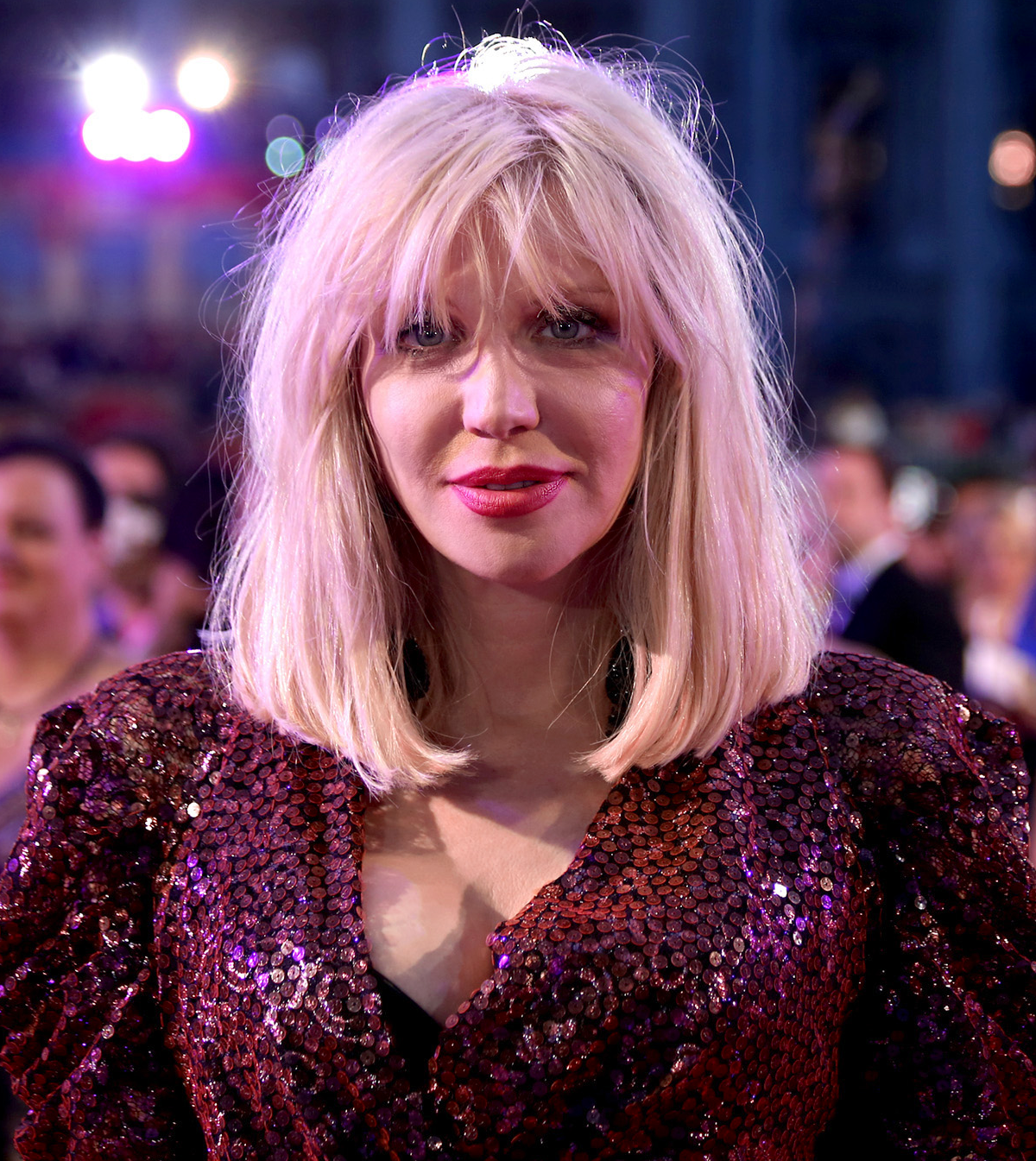
Courtney Love – Best Supporting Actress in a Motion Picture, Drama

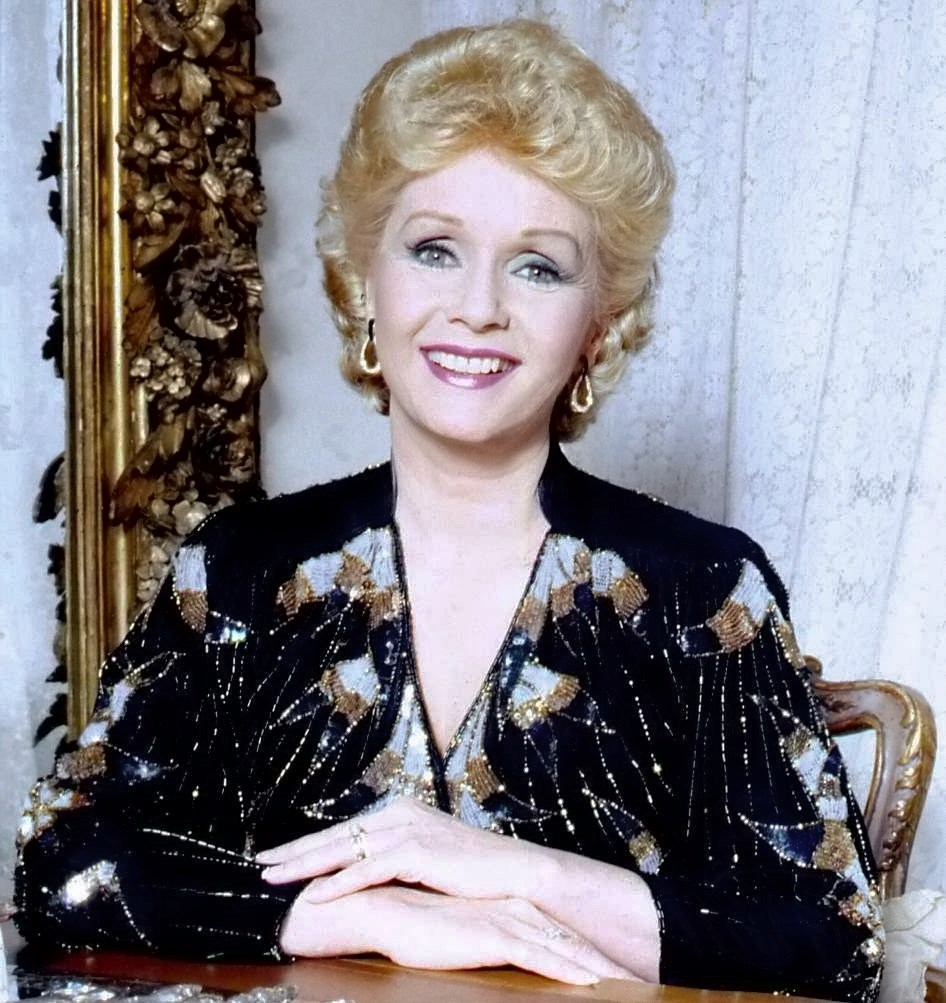
Debbie Reynolds – Best Supporting Actress in a Motion Picture, Comedy or Musical

=== Best Actor – Drama ===
Geoffrey Rush – Shine as David Helfgott (TIE)
James Woods – Killer: A Journal of Murder as Carl Panzram (TIE)

- Christopher Eccleston – Jude as Jude Fawley
- Ralph Fiennes – The English Patient as László Almásy
- William H. Macy – Fargo as Jerry Lundergaard
- Billy Bob Thornton – Sling Blade as Karl Childers

=== Best Actor – Musical or Comedy ===
Tom Cruise – Jerry Maguire as Jerry Maguire

- Nathan Lane – The Birdcage as Albert Goldman
- Eddie Murphy – The Nutty Professor as Sherman Klump
- Jack Nicholson – Mars Attacks! as President James Dale
- Stanley Tucci – Big Night as Secondo

=== Best Actress – Drama ===
Frances McDormand – Fargo as Marge Gunderson

- Brenda Blethyn – Secrets & Lies as Cynthia Purley
- Kristin Scott Thomas – The English Patient as Katharine Clifton
- Emily Watson – Breaking the Waves as Bess McNeill
- Robin Wright Penn – Moll Flanders as Moll Flanders

=== Best Actress – Musical or Comedy ===
Gwyneth Paltrow – Emma as Emma Woodhouse

- Glenn Close – 101 Dalmatians as Cruella de Vil
- Shirley MacLaine – Mrs. Winterbourne as Grace Winterbourne
- Heather Matarazzo – Welcome to the Dollhouse as Dawn Wiener
- Bette Midler – The First Wives Club as Brenda Morelli-Cushman

=== Best Animated or Mixed Media Film ===
The Hunchback of Notre Dame

- James and the Giant Peach
- Mars Attacks!
- Muppet Treasure Island
- Space Jam

=== Best Art Direction ===
Romeo + Juliet – Catherine Martin

- The English Patient
- Evita
- Hamlet
- The Portrait of a Lady

=== Best Cinematography ===
The English Patient – John Seale

- Breaking the Waves
- Evita
- Hamlet
- Romeo + Juliet

=== Best Costume Design ===
Evita – Penny Rose

- Hamlet
- Moll Flanders
- The Portrait of a Lady
- Ridicule

=== Best Director ===
Joel Coen – Fargo

- Scott Hicks – Shine
- Mike Leigh – Secrets & Lies
- Anthony Minghella – The English Patient
- Lars von Trier – Breaking the Waves

=== Best Editing ===
Independence Day – David Brenner

- The English Patient
- Fargo
- Mission: Impossible
- Romeo + Juliet

=== Best Film – Drama ===
Fargo

- The English Patient
- Lone Star
- Secrets & Lies
- Shine
- Trainspotting

=== Best Film – Musical or Comedy ===
Evita

- Cold Comfort Farm
- Everyone Says I Love You
- Flirting with Disaster
- Swingers

=== Best Foreign Language Film ===
Breaking the Waves, Denmark

- Bitter Sugar (Azúcar amarga), Cuba
- A Judgement in Stone (Le cérémonie), France
- Kolya (Kolja), Czech Republic
- Prisoner of the Mountains (Kavkazskiy plennik), Russia
- Ridicule, France

=== Best Original Score ===
"The English Patient" – Gabriel Yared

- "Hamlet" – Patrick Doyle
- "Mars Attacks!" – Danny Elfman
- "Michael Collins" – Elliot Goldenthal
- "Sling Blade" – Daniel Lanois

=== Best Original Song ===
"You Must Love Me" performed by Madonna – Evita

- "God Give Me Strength" performed by Kristen Vigard – Grace of My Heart
- "Kissing You" performed by Des'ree – Romeo + Juliet
- "That Thing You Do" performed by The Wonders – That Thing You Do!
- "Walls" performed by Tom Petty – She's the One

=== Best Screenplay – Adapted ===
The English Patient – Anthony Minghella

- The Crucible – Arthur Miller
- Jude – Hossein Amini
- The Portrait of a Lady – Laura Jones
- Trainspotting – John Hodge

=== Best Screenplay – Original ===
Lone Star – John Sayles (TIE)
The People vs. Larry Flynt – Scott Alexander and Larry Karaszewski (TIE)

- Fargo – Joel Coen and Ethan Coen
- Shine – Jan Sardi
- Sling Blade – Billy Bob Thornton

=== Best Supporting Actor – Drama ===
Armin Mueller-Stahl – Shine as Peter

- Steve Buscemi – Fargo as Carl Showalter
- Robert Carlyle – Trainspotting as Francis "Franco" Begbie
- Jeremy Irons – Stealing Beauty as Alex Parrish
- John Lynch – Moll Flanders as Jonathan
- Paul Scofield – The Crucible as Thomas Danforth

=== Best Supporting Actor – Musical or Comedy ===
Cuba Gooding Jr. – Jerry Maguire as Rod Tidwell

- Woody Allen – Everyone Says I Love You as Joe Berlin
- Danny DeVito – Matilda as Harry Wormwood
- Gene Hackman – The Birdcage as Senator Kevin Keeley
- Ian McKellen – Cold Comfort Farm as Amos Starkader

=== Best Supporting Actress – Drama ===
Courtney Love – The People vs. Larry Flynt as Althea Flynt

- Joan Allen – The Crucible as Elizabeth Proctor
- Stockard Channing – Moll Flanders as Mrs. Allworthy
- Miranda Richardson – The Evening Star as Patsy Carpenter
- Kate Winslet – Hamlet as Ophelia

=== Best Supporting Actress – Musical or Comedy ===
Debbie Reynolds – Mother as Beatrice Henderson

- Lauren Bacall – The Mirror Has Two Faces as Hannah Morgan
- Goldie Hawn – Everyone Says I Love You as Skylar Dandridge
- Sarah Jessica Parker – The First Wives Club as Shelly Stewart
- Renée Zellweger – Jerry Maguire as Dorothy Boyd

=== Best Visual Effects ===
Independence Day – Volker Engel and Douglas Smith

- Dragonheart
- Mars Attacks!
- Star Trek: First Contact
- Twister

== Television winners and nominees ==
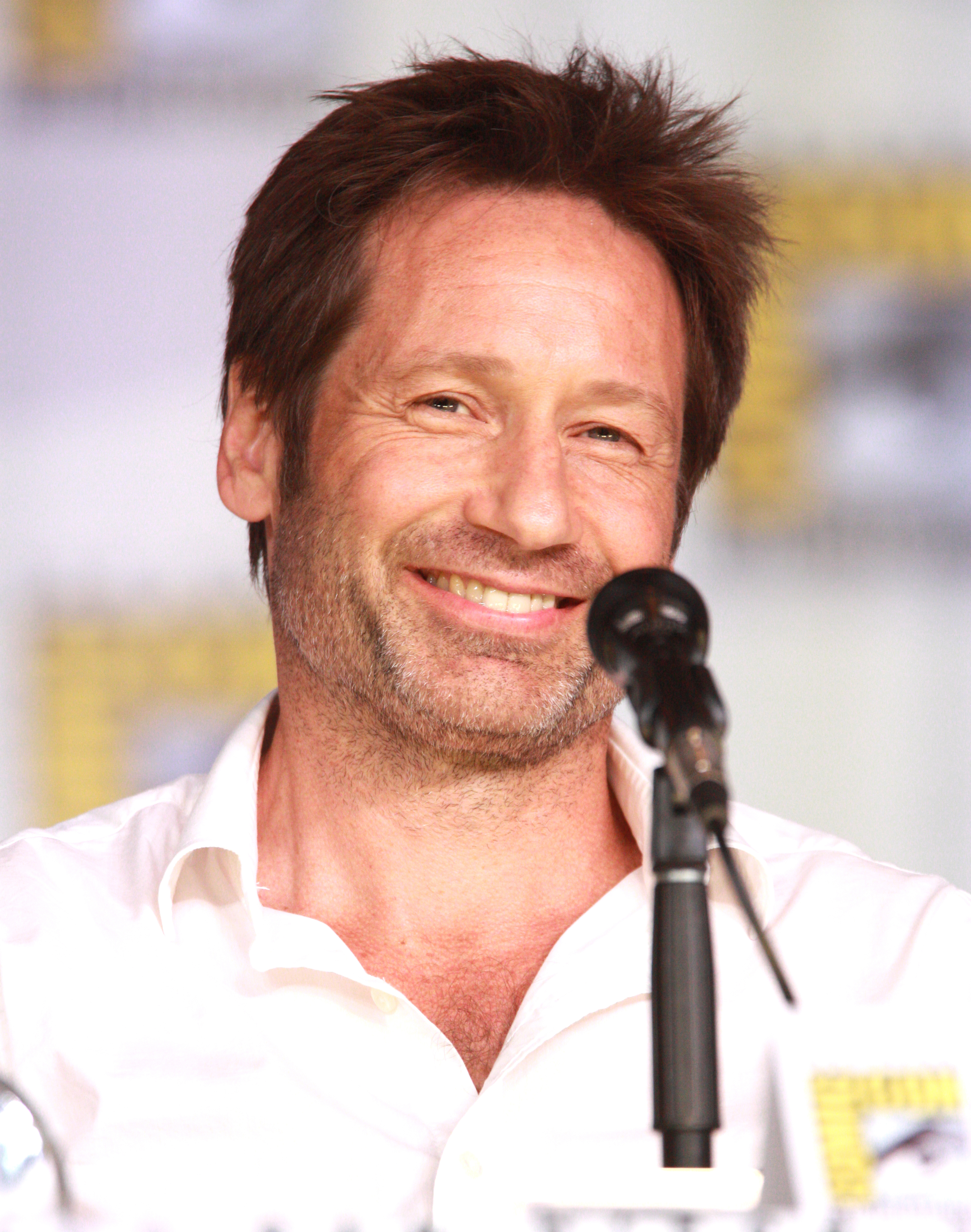
David Duchovny – Best Actor in a Series – Drama

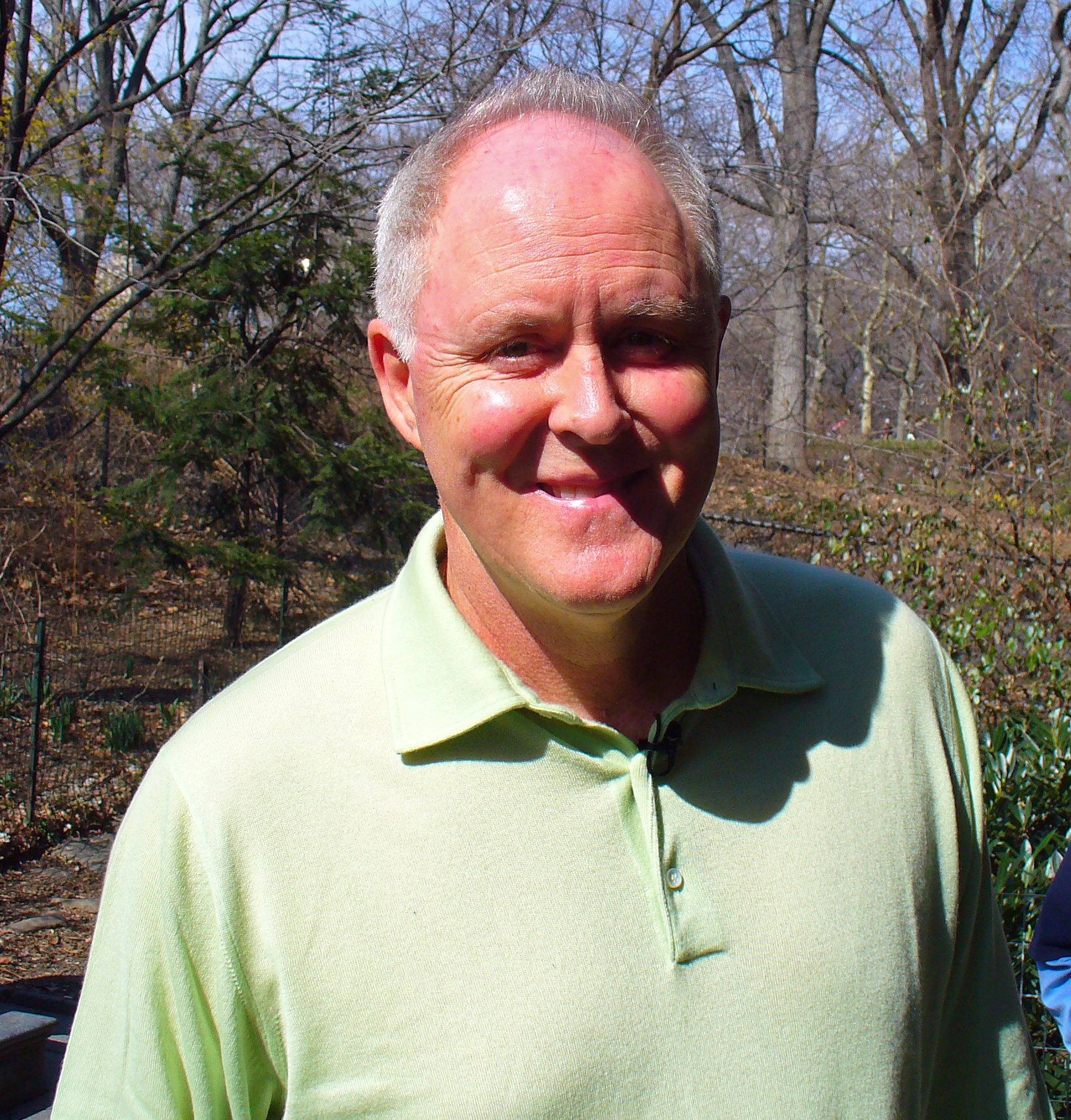
John Lithgow – Best Actor in a Series – Comedy or Musical

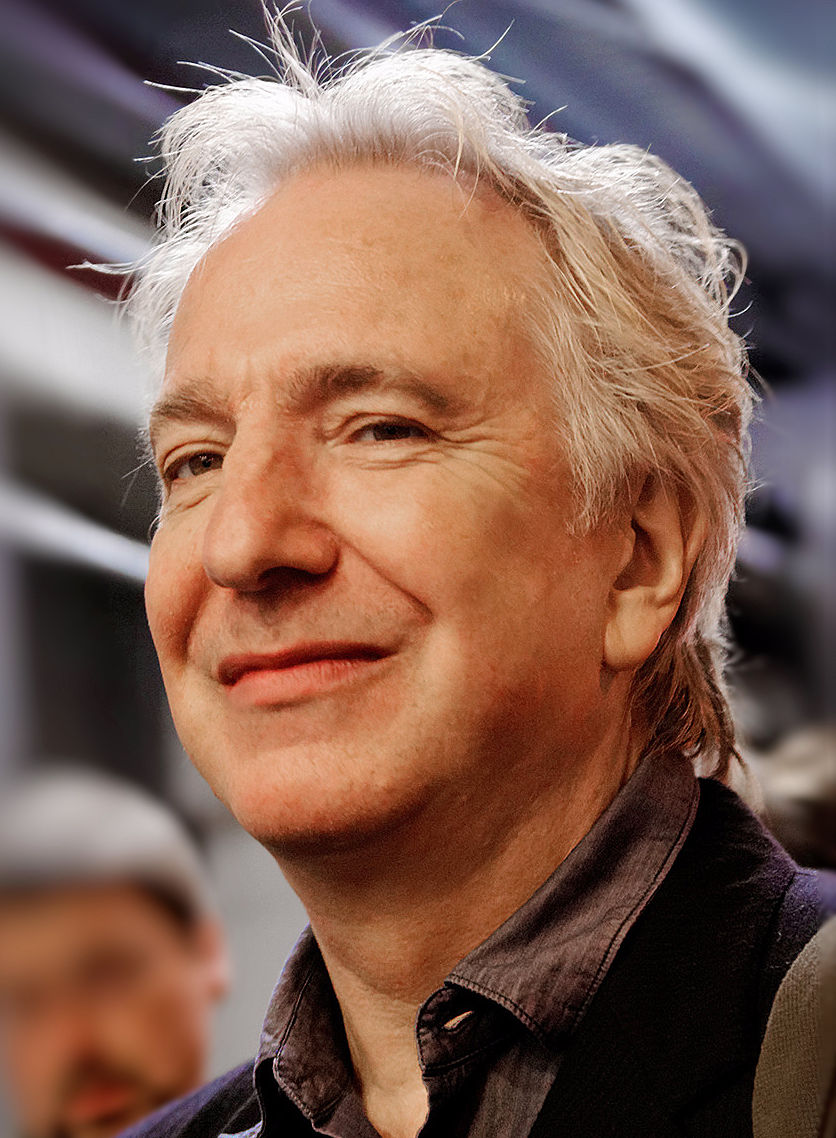
Alan Rickman – Best Actor in a Miniseries or Television Film

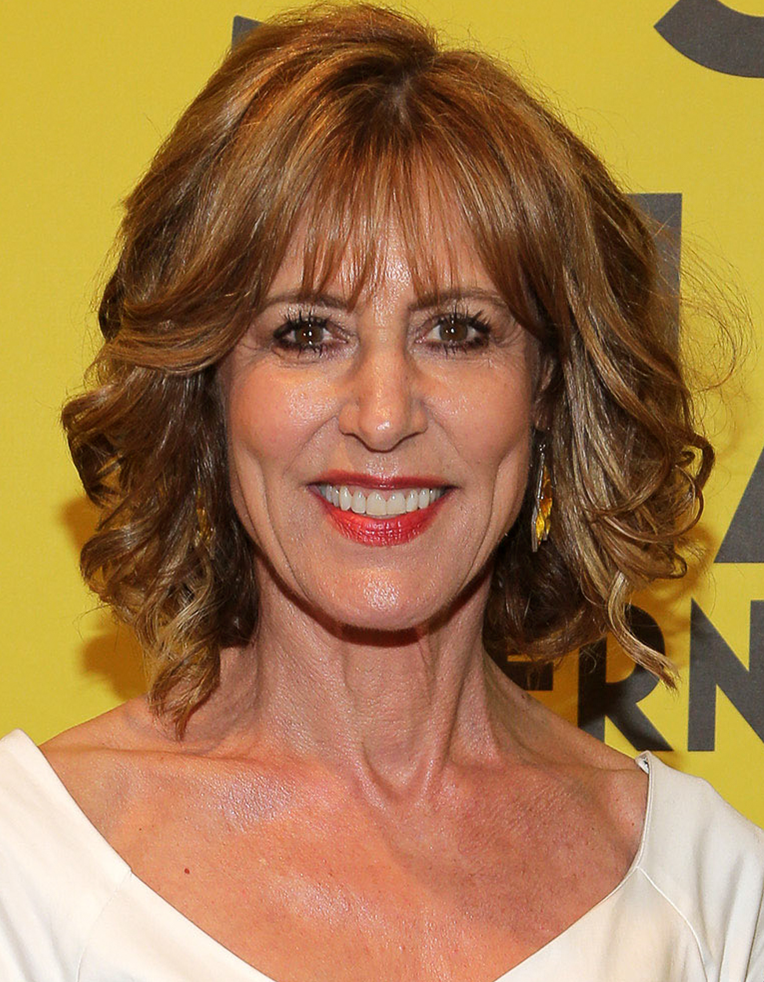
Christine Lahti – Best Actress in a Series, Drama

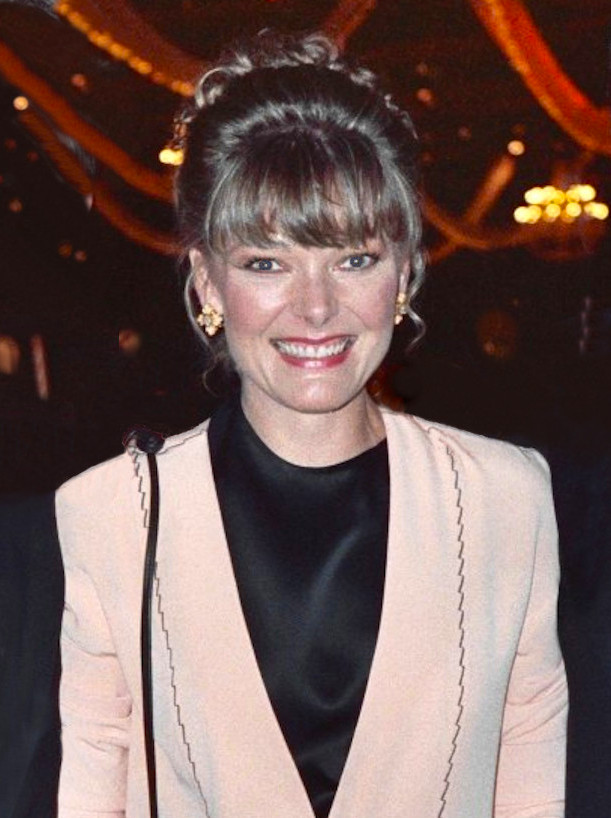
Jane Curtin – Best Actress in a Series, Comedy or Musical

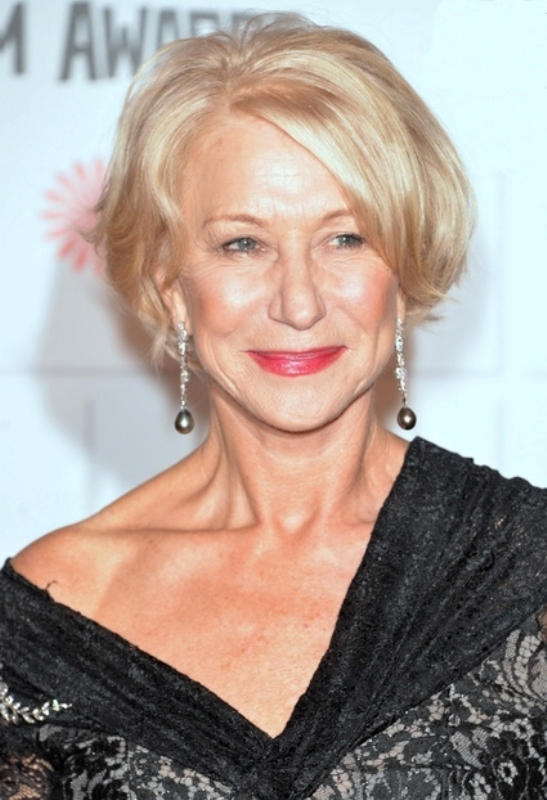
Helen Mirren – Best Actress in a Miniseries or Television Film

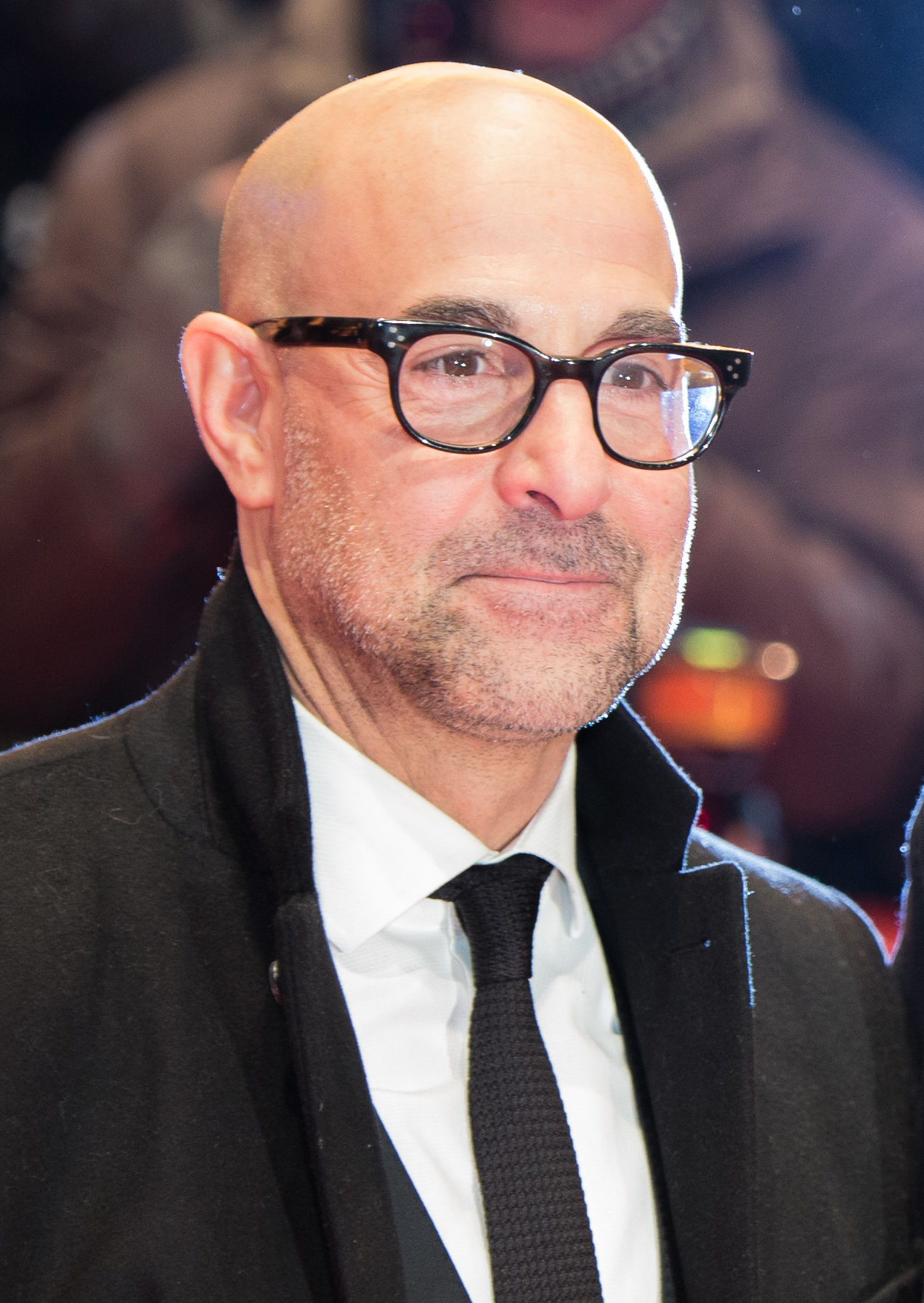
Stanley Tucci – Best Supporting Actor in a Series, Miniseries or Television Film

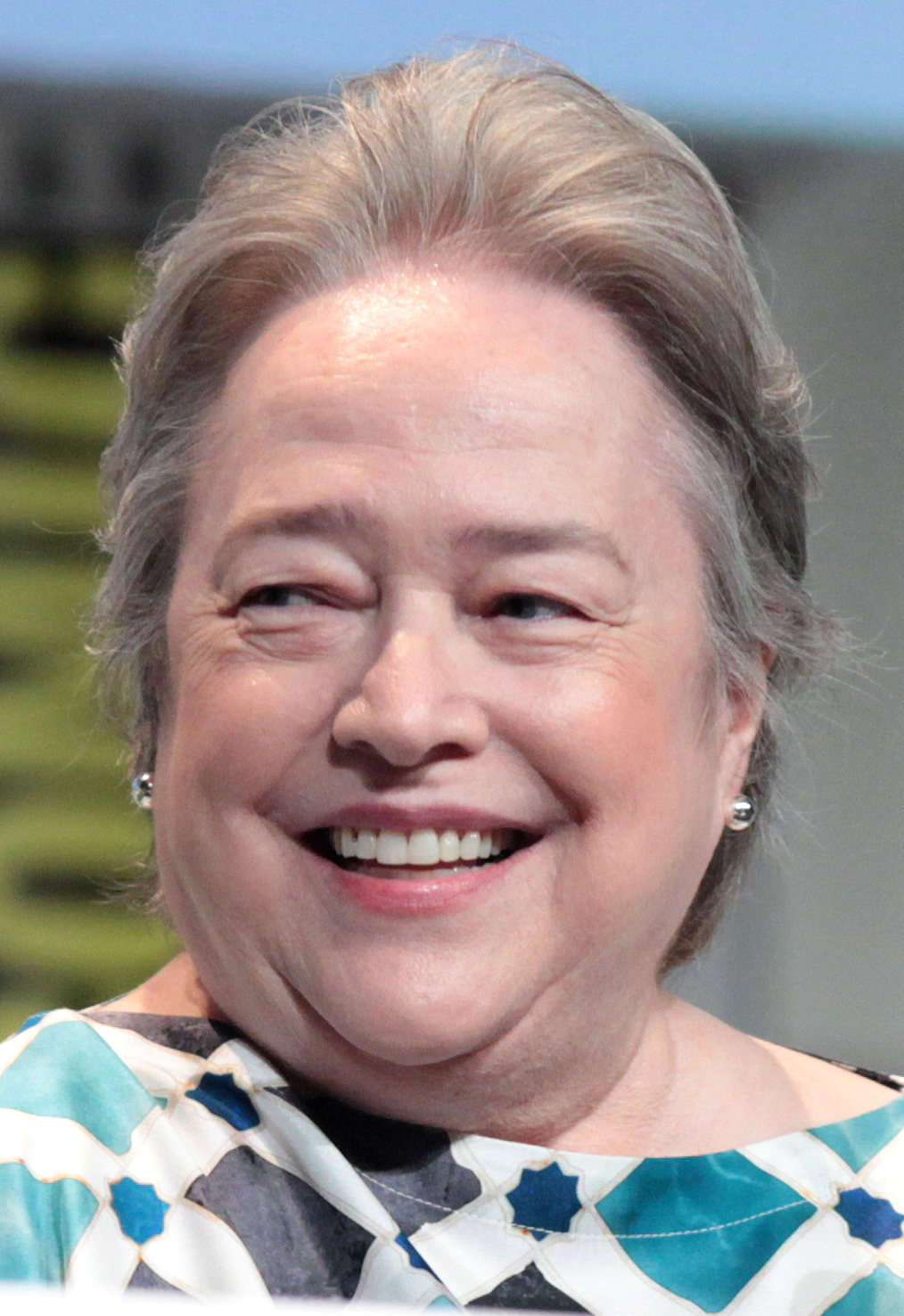
Kathy Bates – Best Supporting Actress in a Series, Miniseries or Television Film

=== Best Actor – Drama Series ===
David Duchovny – The X-Files as Fox Mulder

- Andre Braugher – Homicide: Life on the Street as Frank Pembleton
- Anthony Edwards – ER as Mark Greene
- Hector Elizondo – Chicago Hope as Phillip Watters
- Dennis Franz – NYPD Blue as Andy Sipowicz

=== Best Actor – Musical or Comedy Series ===
John Lithgow – 3rd Rock from the Sun as Dick Solomon

- Michael J. Fox – Spin City as Mike Flaherty
- Michael Richards – Seinfeld as Cosmo Kramer
- Garry Shandling – The Larry Sanders Show as Larry Sanders
- Rip Torn – The Larry Sanders Show as Artie

=== Best Actor – Miniseries or TV Film ===
Alan Rickman – Rasputin: Dark Servant of Destiny as Grigori Rasputin

- Beau Bridges – Hidden in America as Bill Januson
- Ted Danson – Gulliver's Travels as Lemuel Gulliver
- Eric Roberts – In Cold Blood as Perry Edward Smith
- James Woods – The Summer of Ben Tyler as Temple Rayburn

=== Best Actress – Drama Series ===
Christine Lahti – Chicago Hope as Kate Austin

- Gillian Anderson – The X-Files as Dana Scully
- Kim Delaney – NYPD Blue as Diane Russell
- Julianna Margulies – ER as Carol Hathaway
- Kimberly Williams-Paisley – Relativity as Isabel Lukens

=== Best Actress – Musical or Comedy Series ===
Jane Curtin – 3rd Rock from the Sun as Mary Albright

- Fran Drescher – The Nanny as Fran Fine
- Helen Hunt – Mad About You as Jamie Buchman
- Cybill Shepherd – Cybill as Cybill Sheridan
- Lea Thompson – Caroline in the City as Caroline Duffy

=== Best Actress – Miniseries or TV Film ===
Helen Mirren – Prime Suspect 5: Errors of Judgment

- Kirstie Alley – Suddenly
- Lolita Davidovich – Harvest on Fire
- Laura Dern – The Siege at Ruby Ridge
- Jena Malone – Hidden in America

=== Best Miniseries or TV Film ===
Gulliver's Travels

- If These Walls Could Talk
- Pride and Prejudice
- The Siege at Ruby Ridge
- The Summer of Ben Tyler

=== Best Series – Drama ===
The X-Files

- Chicago Hope
- ER
- Homicide: Life on the Street
- NYPD Blue

=== Best Series – Musical or Comedy ===
The Larry Sanders Show

- 3rd Rock from the Sun
- Cybill
- Seinfeld
- Spin City

=== Best Supporting Actor – (Mini)Series or TV Film ===
Stanley Tucci – Murder One

- Brian Dennehy – A Season in Purgatory
- Ian McKellen – Rasputin: Dark Servant of Destiny
- Anthony Quinn – Gotti
- Treat Williams – The Late Shift

=== Best Supporting Actress – (Mini)Series or TV Film ===
Kathy Bates – The Late Shift

- Cher – If These Walls Could Talk
- Gail O'Grady – NYPD Blue
- Greta Scacchi – Rasputin: Dark Servant of Destiny
- Alfre Woodard – Gulliver's Travels

== New Media winners and nominees ==
=== Best Home Entertainment Product/Game ===
Super Mario 64

- Die Hard Trilogy
- John Madden Football 1996 (Electronic Arts)
- Nights (Sega)
- Tekken 2

=== CD-ROM Educational – Children ===
101 Dalmatians Storybook

- Freddi Fish 2: The Case of the Haunted Schoolhouse
- Living Books: Sheila Rae, The Brave
- The Simpsons: Cartoon Studio
- Snoopy's Campfire Stories

=== CD-ROM Entertainment ===
Cinemania 97

- Encarta 97 – Encyclopedia Deluxe
- Eyewitness Encyclopedia of Space and the Universe
- Inside Independence Day
- Leonardo da Vinci

=== CD-ROM Game ===
Monty Python & the Quest for the Holy Grail

- Descent II
- Goosebumps
- Quake
- Warcraft II: Beyond the Dark Portal

== Awards breakdown ==
=== Film ===
Winners:

3 / 5 Evita: Best Costume Design / Best Film – Musical or Comedy / Best Original Song
3 / 7 Fargo: Best Director / Best Actress & Film – Drama
3 / 9 The English Patient: Best Adapted Screenplay / Best Cinematography / Best Original Score
2 / 2 Independence Day: Best Editing / Best Visual Effects
2 / 2 The People vs. Larry Flynt: Best Screenplay – Original / Best Supporting Actress – Drama
2 / 3 Jerry Maguire: Best Actor & Supporting Actor – Musical or Comedy
2 / 5 Shine: Best Actor & Supporting Actor – Drama
1 / 1 Emma: Best Actress – Musical or Comedy
1 / 1 The Hunchback of Notre Dame: Best Animated or Mixed Media Film
1 / 1 Killer: A Journal of Murder: Best Actor – Drama
1 / 1 Mother: Best Supporting Actress – Musical or Comedy
1 / 2 Lone Star: Best Screenplay – Original
1 / 4 Breaking the Waves: Best Foreign Language Film
1 / 4 Romeo + Juliet: Best Art Direction

Losers:

0 / 5 Hamlet
0 / 4 Mars Attacks!, Moll Flanders
0 / 3 The Crucible, Everyone Says I Love You, The Portrait of a Lady, Sling Blade, Secrets & Lies, Trainspotting
0 / 2 The Birdcage, Cold Comfort Farm, The First Wives Club, Jude, Ridicule

=== Television ===
Winners:

2 / 3 3rd Rock from the Sun: Best Actor & Actress – Musical or Comedy Series
2 / 3 The X-Files: Best Actor – Drama Series / Best Series – Drama
1 / 1 Murder One: Best Supporting Actor – (Mini)Series or TV Film
1 / 1 Prime Suspect 5: Errors of Judgment: Best Actress – Miniseries or TV Film
1 / 2 The Late Shift: Best Supporting Actress – (Mini)Series or TV Film
1 / 3 Chicago Hope: Best Actress – Drama Series
1 / 3 Gulliver's Travels: Best Miniseries or TV Film
1 / 3 The Larry Sanders Show: Best Series – Musical or Comedy
1 / 3 Rasputin: Dark Servant of Destiny: Best Actor – Miniseries or TV Film

Losers:

0 / 4 NYPD Blue
0 / 3 ER
0 / 2 Cybill, Hidden in America, Homicide: Life on the Street, If These Walls Could Talk, Seinfeld, The Siege at Ruby Ridge, Spin City, The Summer of Ben Tyler
