= 54th Golden Globe Awards =

Film award ceremony in 1997

- Date: January 19, 1997
- Site: Beverly Hilton Hotel, Beverly Hills, California

Highlights
- Best Film: Drama: The English Patient
- Best Film: Musical or Comedy: Evita
- Best Drama Series: The X-Files
- Best Musical or Comedy Series: 3rd Rock from the Sun
- Most awards: (3) Evita
- Most nominations: (7) The English Patient

Television coverage
- Network: NBC

The 54th Golden Globe Awards, honoring the best in film and television for 1996, were held on January 19, 1997 at the Beverly Hilton. The nominations were announced on December 19, 1996.

== Winners and nominees ==
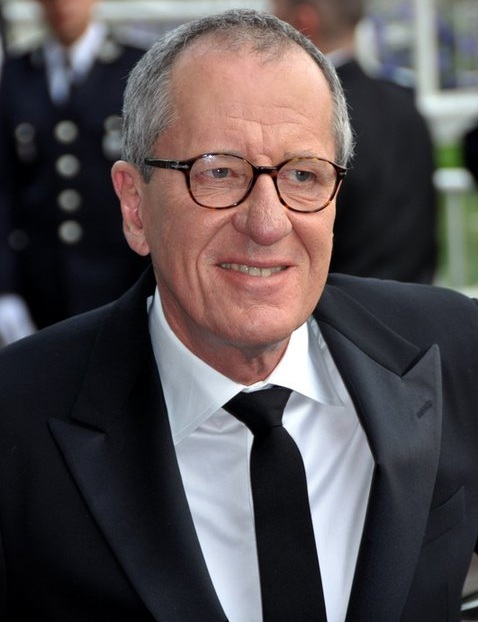
Geoffrey Rush — Best Actor in a Motion Picture, Drama winner

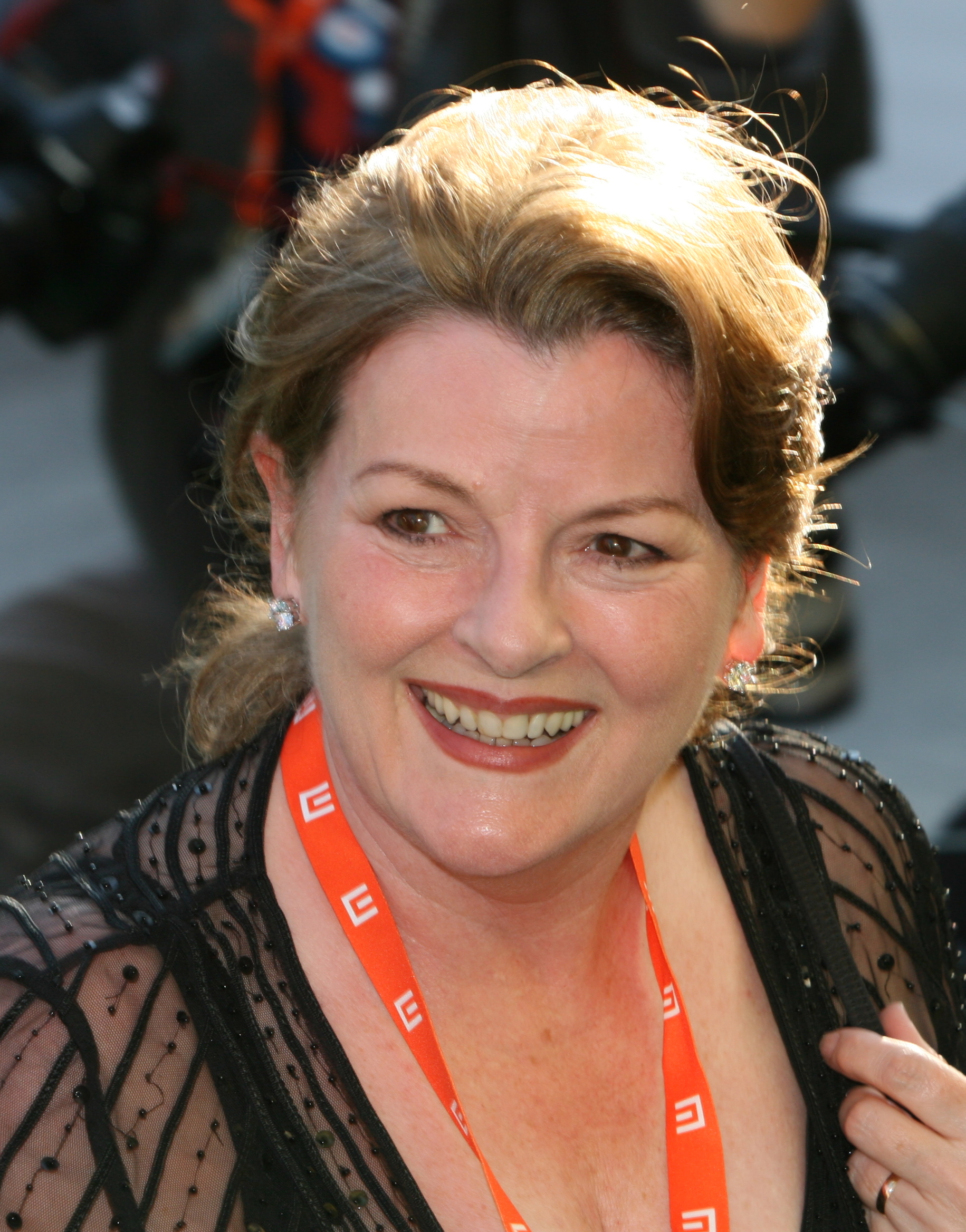
Brenda Blethyn — Best Actress in a Motion Picture, Drama winner

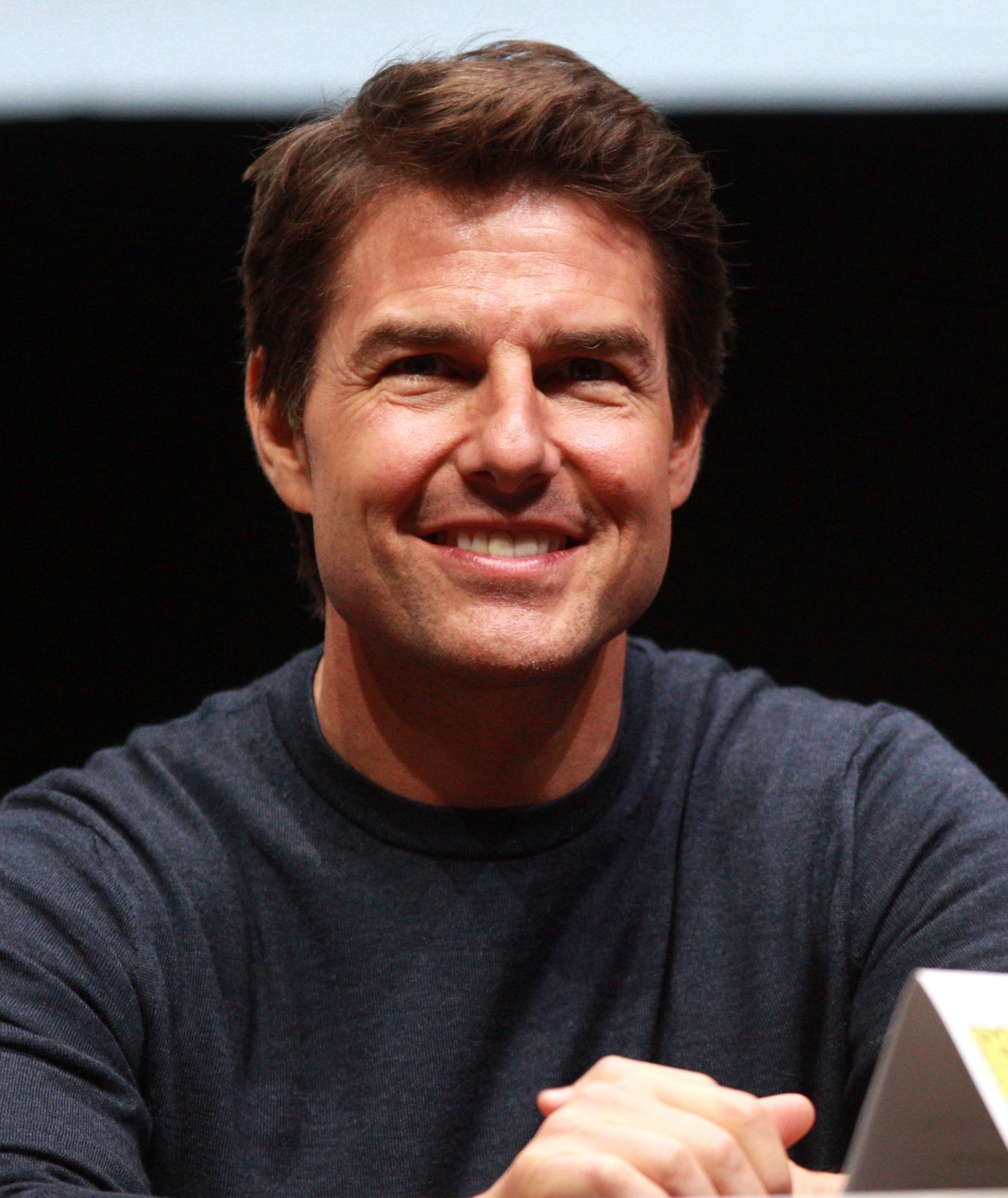
Tom Cruise — Best Actor in a Motion Picture, Musical or Comedy winner

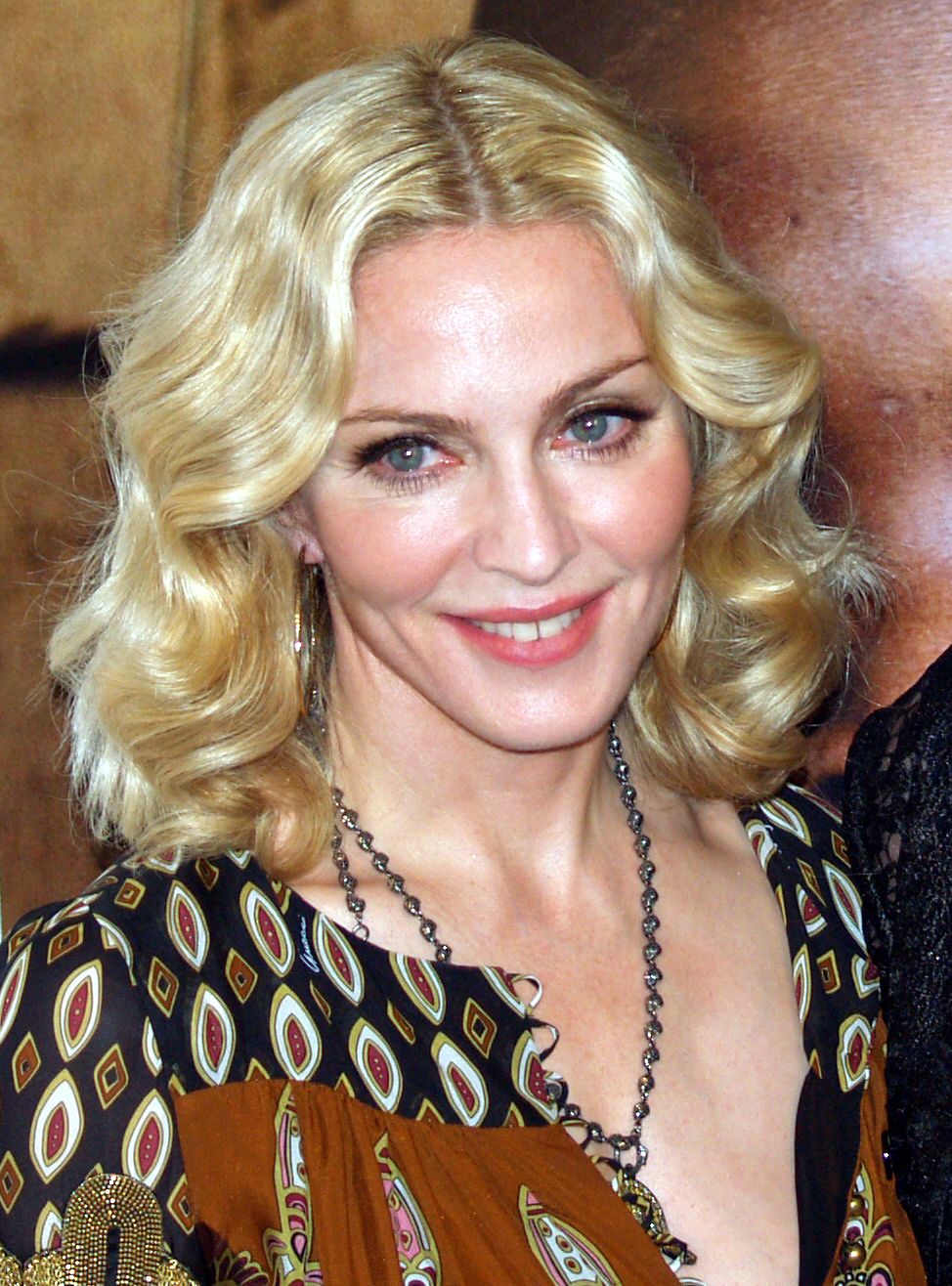
Madonna — Best Actress in a Motion Picture, Musical or Comedy winner

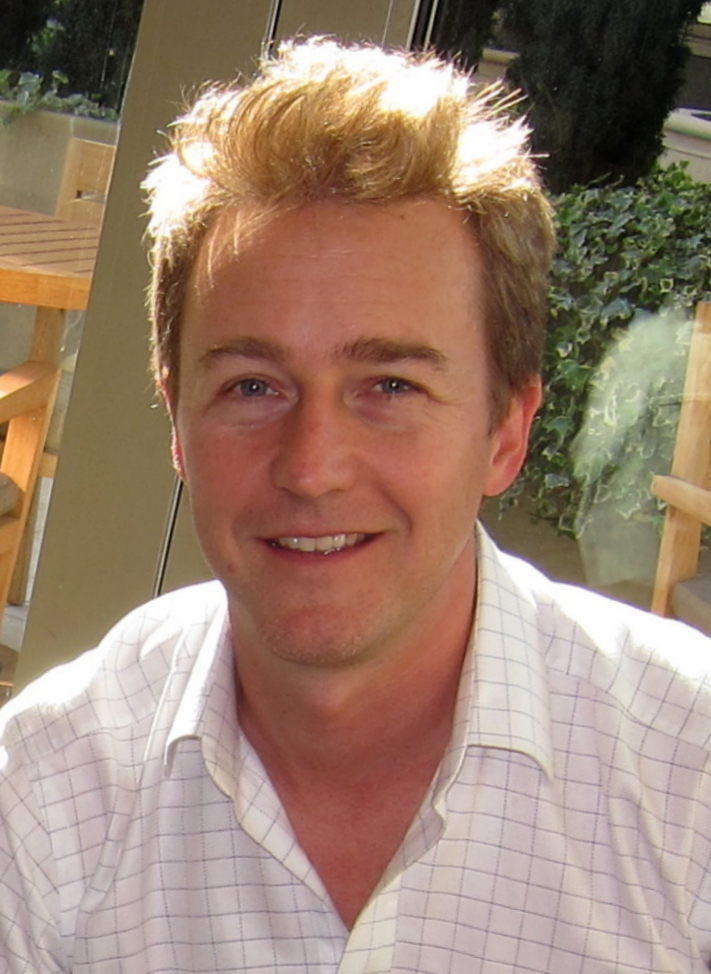
Edward Norton — Best Supporting Actor in a Motion Picture Drama, Musical or Comedy winner

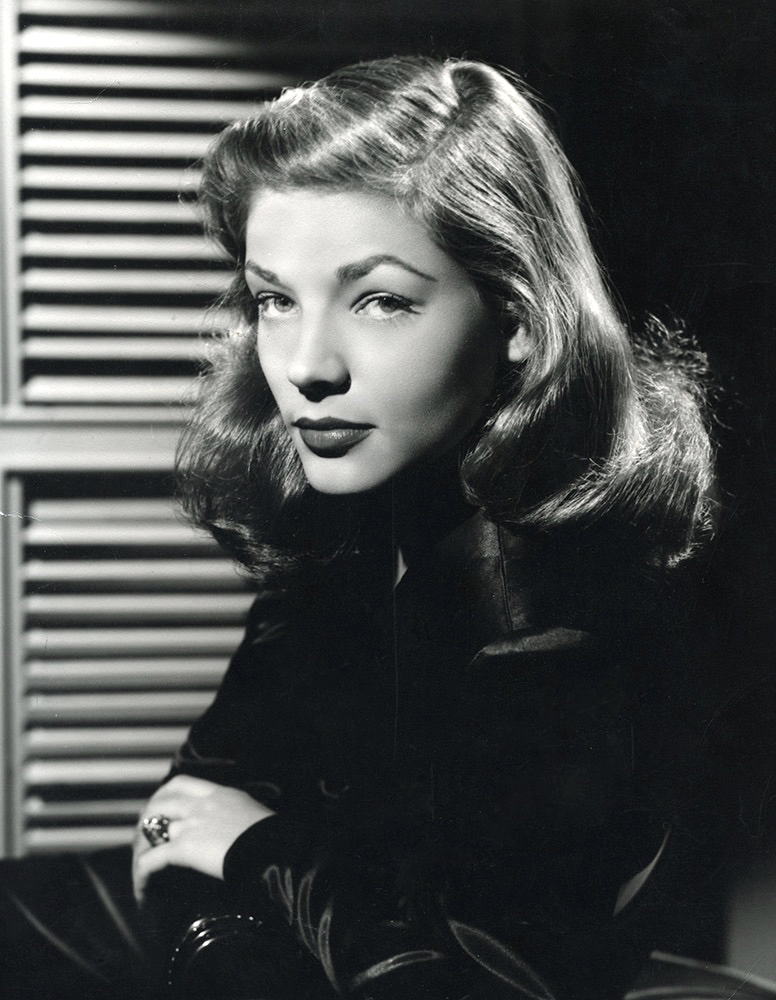
Lauren Bacall — Best Supporting Actress in a Motion Picture Drama, Musical or Comedy winner

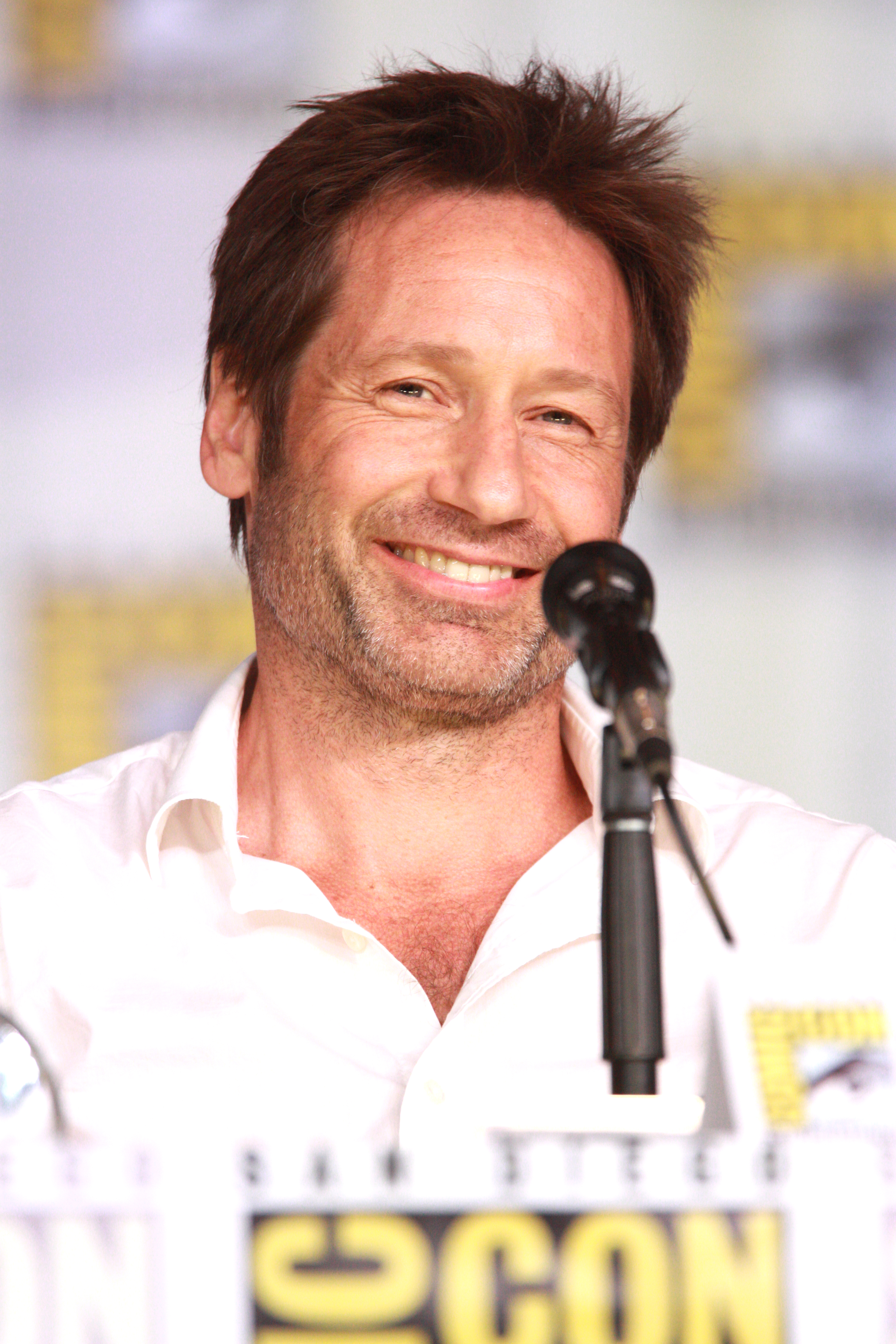
David Duchovny — Best Actor in a Television Series, Drama winner

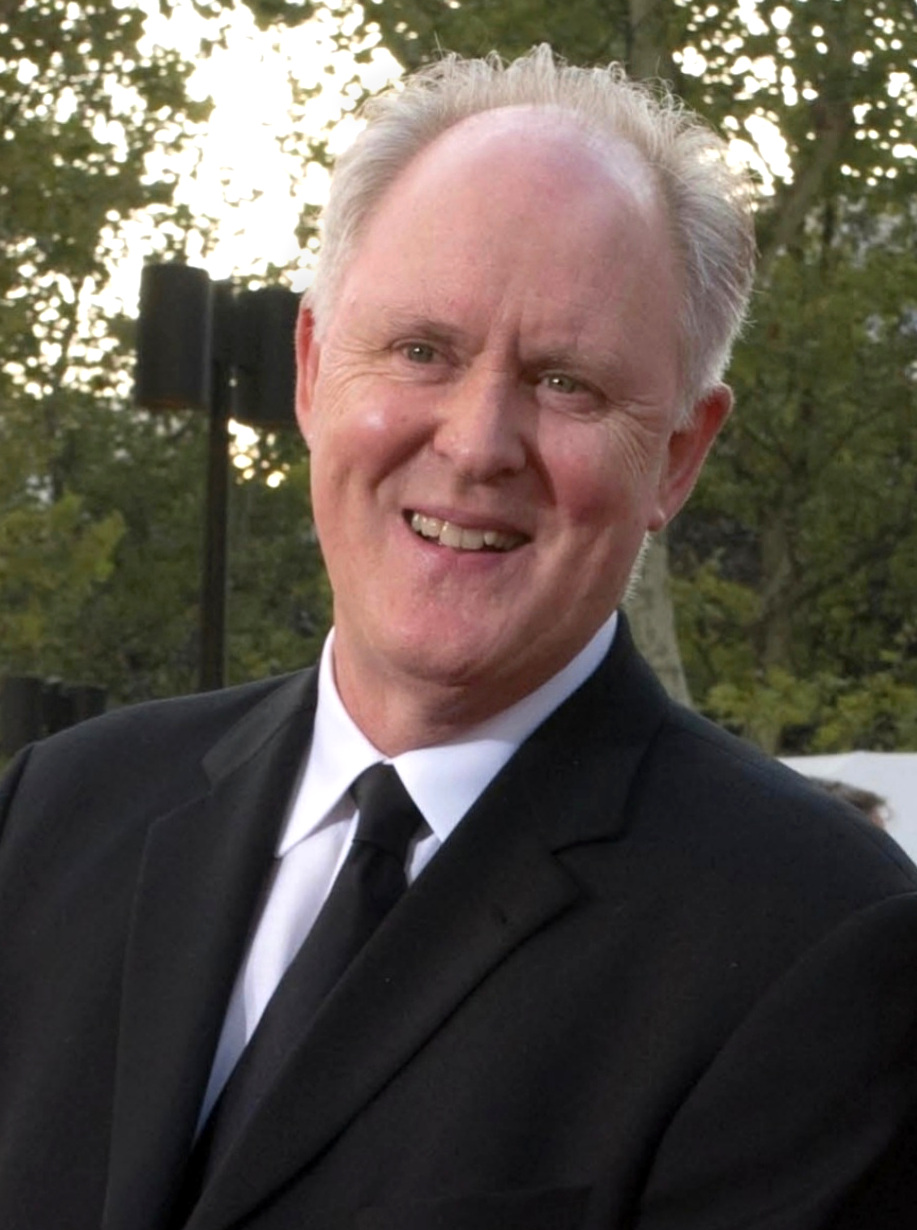
John Lithgow — Best Actor in a Television Series, Musical or Comedy winner

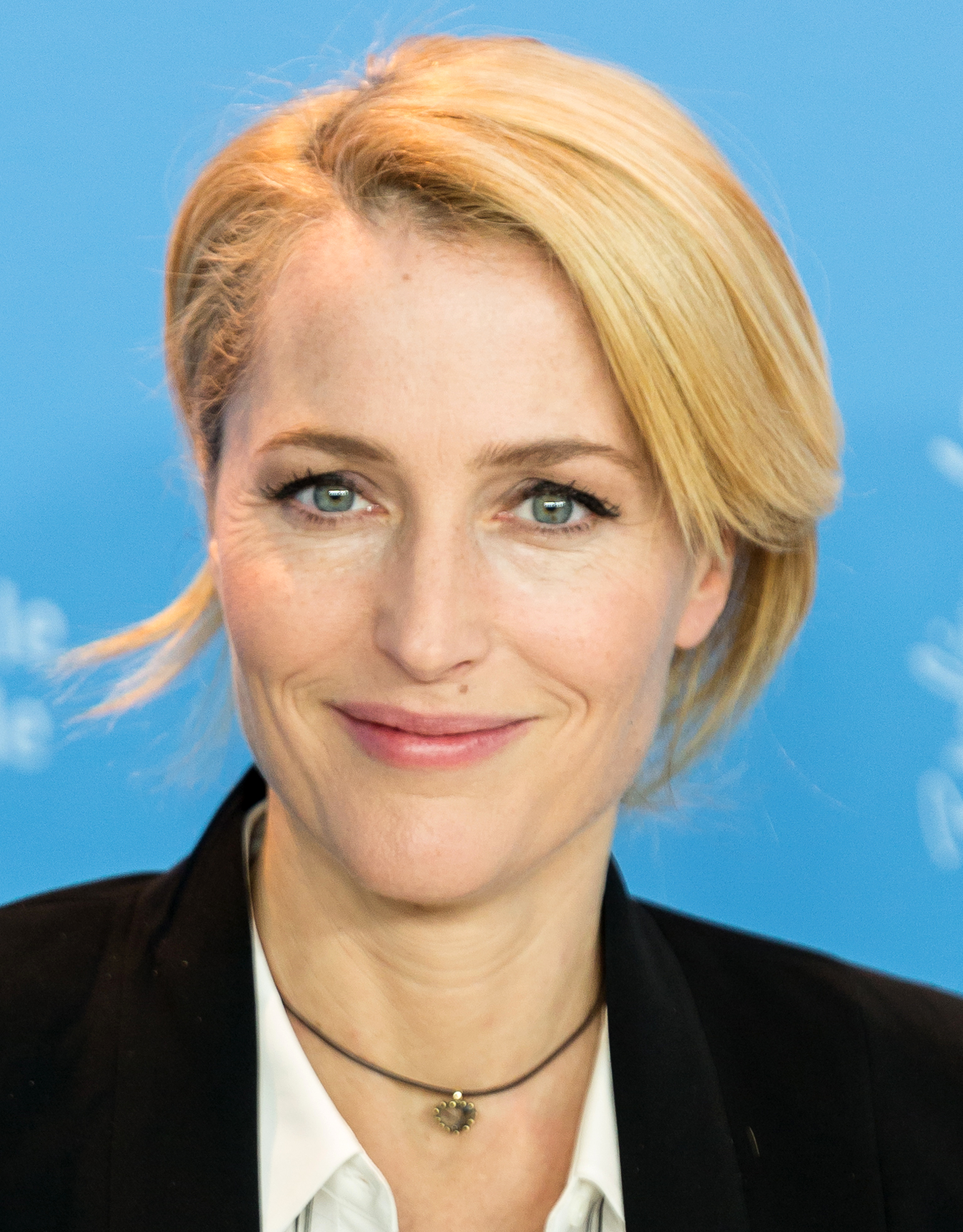
Gillian Anderson — Best Actress in a Television Series, Drama winner

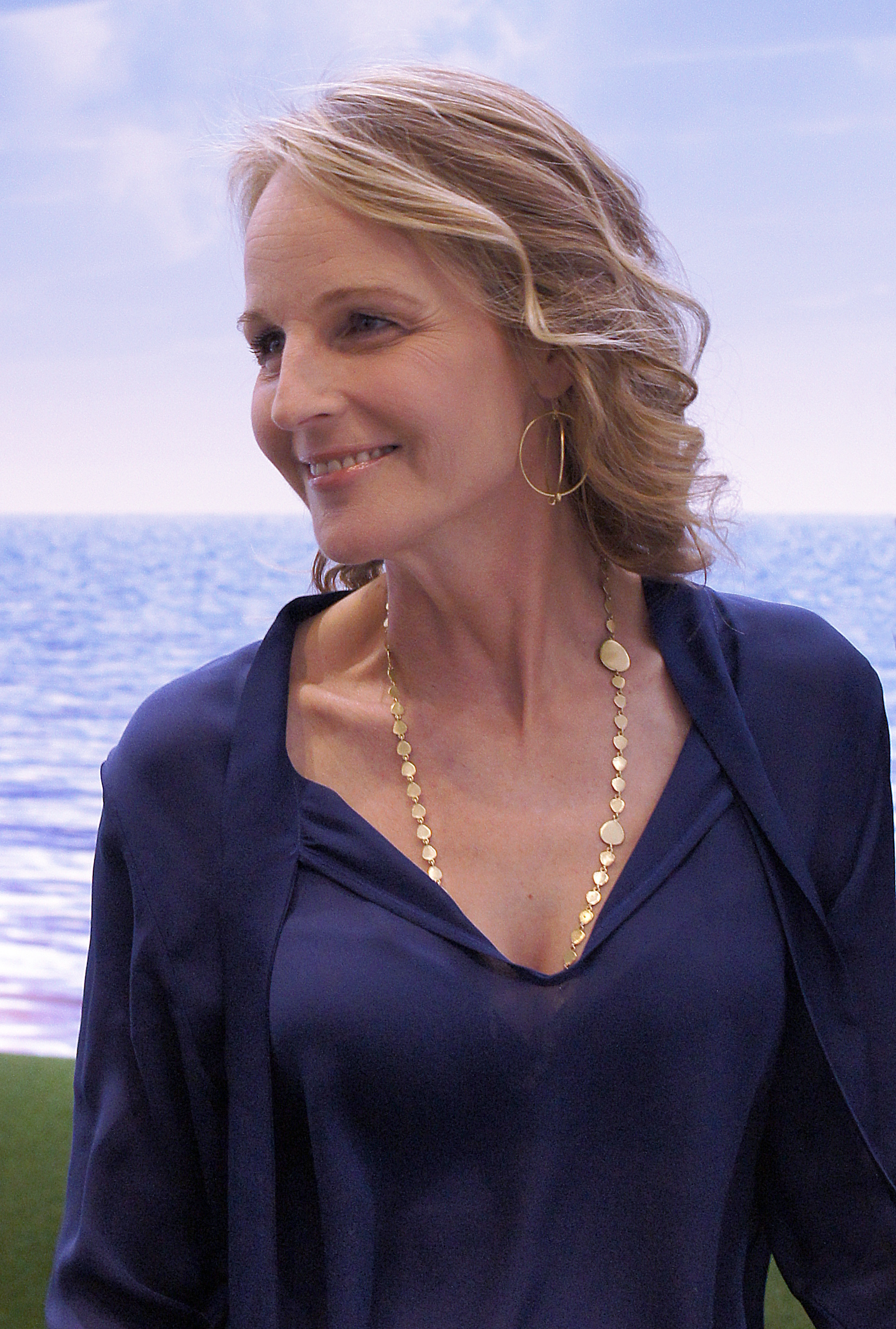
Helen Hunt — Best Actress in a Television Series, Musical or Comedy winner

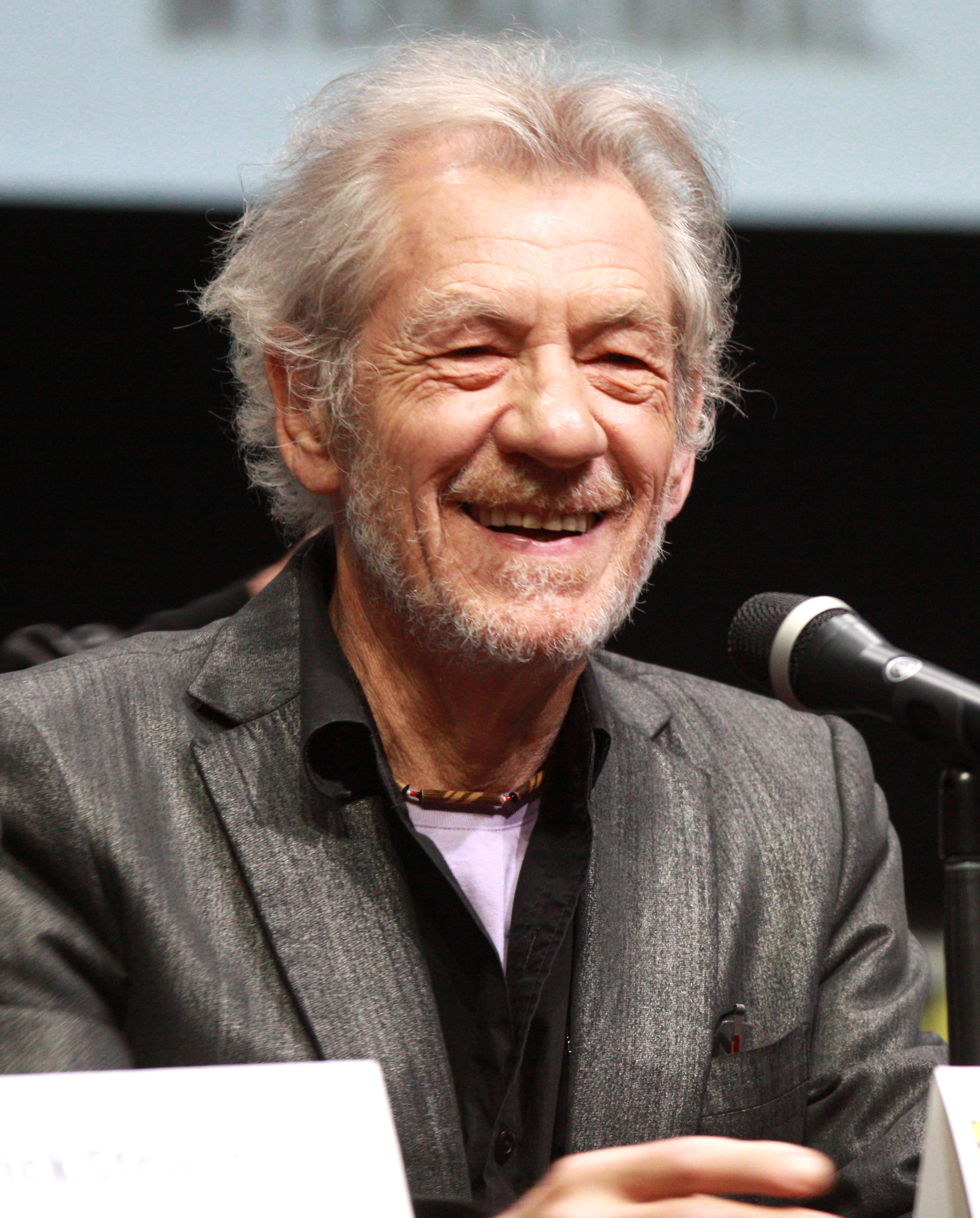
Ian McKellen — Best Supporting Actor in a Series, Miniseries or Motion Picture Made for Television winner

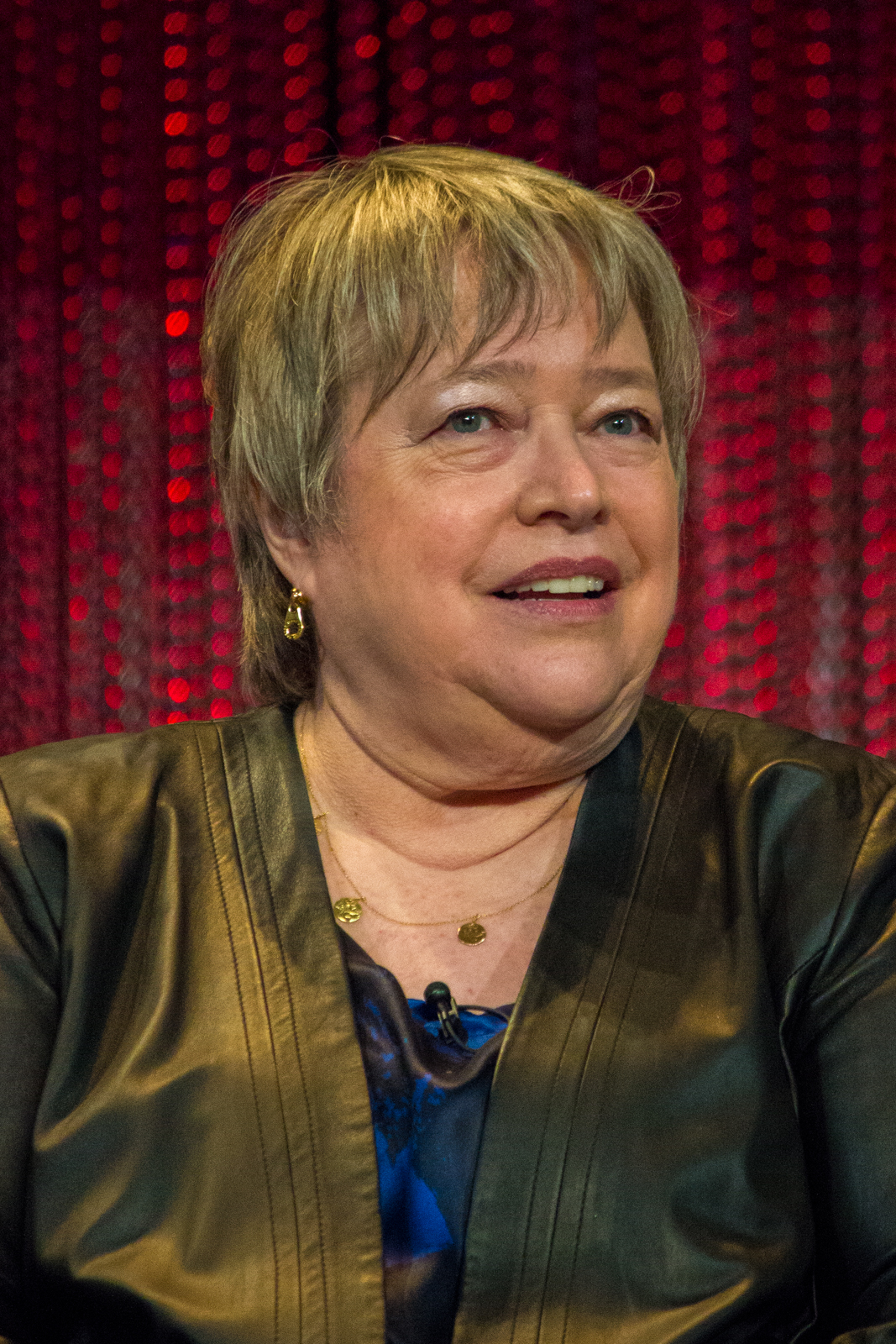
Kathy Bates — Best Supporting Actress in a Series, Miniseries or Motion Picture Made for Television winner

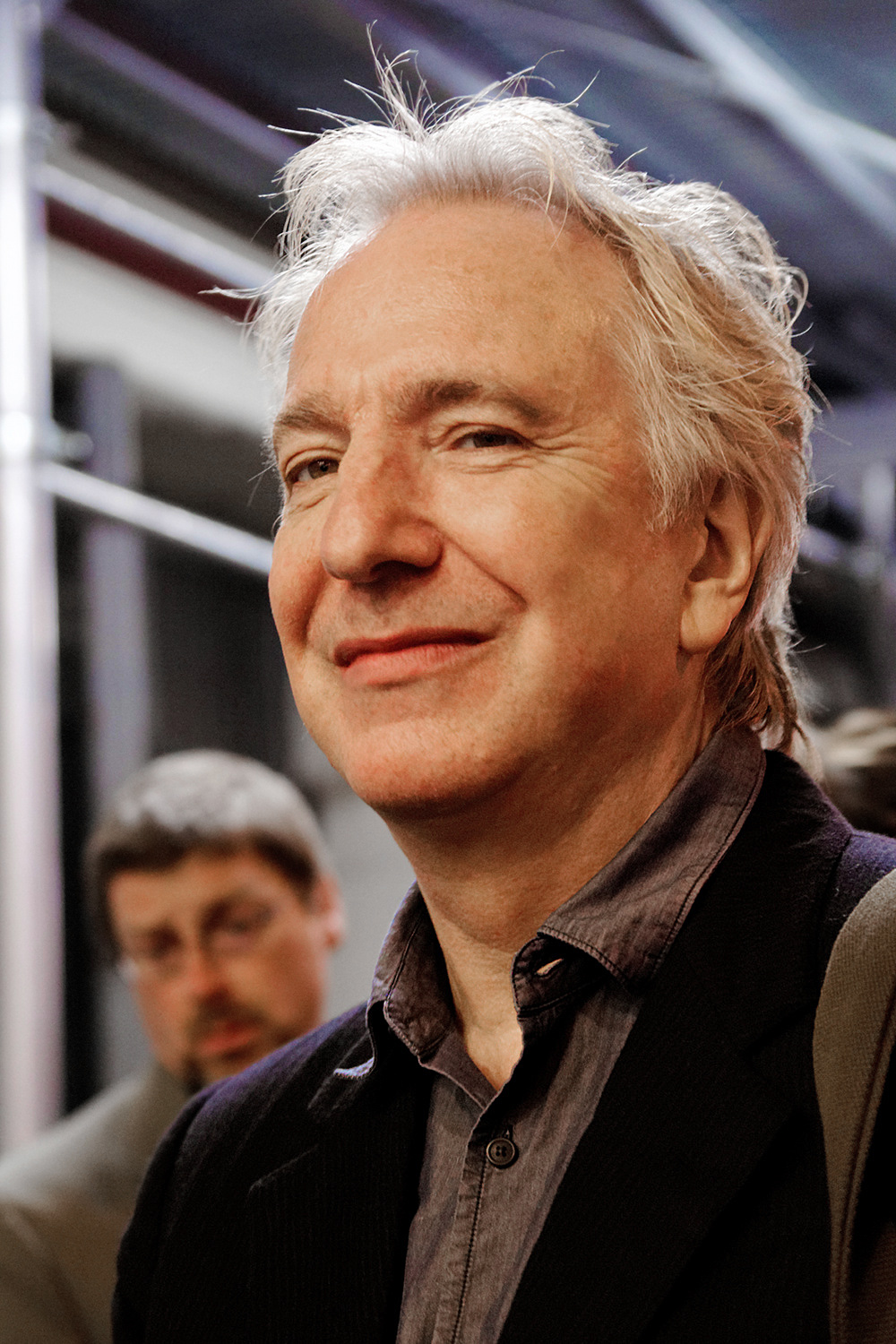
Alan Rickman — Best Actor in a Miniseries or Television Film winner

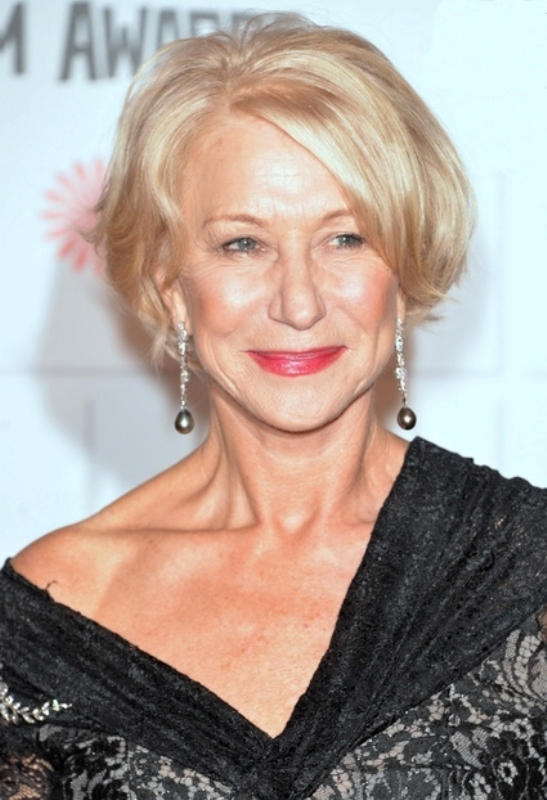
Helen Mirren — Best Actress in a Miniseries or Television Film winner

=== Film ===
Best Motion Picture
Drama	Musical or Comedy
The English Patient: Breaking the Waves; The People vs. Larry Flynt; Secrets & Lies; Shine	Evita: The Birdcage; Everyone Says I Love You; Fargo; Jerry Maguire
Best Performance in a Motion Picture – Drama
Actor	Actress
Geoffrey Rush – Shine as David Helfgott: Ralph Fiennes – The English Patient as László Almásy; Mel Gibson – Ransom as Tom Mullen; Woody Harrelson – The People vs. Larry Flynt as Larry Flynt; Liam Neeson – Michael Collins as Michael Collins	Brenda Blethyn – Secrets & Lies as Cynthia Purley: Courtney Love – The People vs. Larry Flynt as Althea Leasure; Meryl Streep – Marvin's Room as Lee; Kristin Scott Thomas – The English Patient as Katharine Clifton; Emily Watson – Breaking the Waves as Bess McNeil
Best Performance in a Motion Picture – Musical or Comedy
Actor	Actress
Tom Cruise – Jerry Maguire as Jerry Maguire: Antonio Banderas – Evita as Ché; Kevin Costner – Tin Cup as Roy "Tin Cup" McAvoy; Nathan Lane – The Birdcage as Albert Goldman; Eddie Murphy – The Nutty Professor as Professor Sherman Klump / Buddy Love	Madonna – Evita as Eva Perón: Glenn Close – 101 Dalmatians as Cruella de Vil; Frances McDormand – Fargo as Marge Gunderson; Debbie Reynolds – Mother as Beatrice Henderson; Barbra Streisand – The Mirror Has Two Faces as Rose Morgan
Best Supporting Performance in a Motion Picture – Drama, Musical or Comedy
Supporting Actor	Supporting Actress
Edward Norton – Primal Fear as Aaron Stampler: Cuba Gooding Jr. – Jerry Maguire as Rod Tidwell; Samuel L. Jackson – A Time to Kill as Carl Lee Hailey; Paul Scofield – The Crucible as Thomas Danforth; James Woods – Ghosts of Mississippi as Byron De La Beckwith	Lauren Bacall – The Mirror Has Two Faces as Hannah Morgan: Joan Allen – The Crucible as Elizabeth Proctor; Juliette Binoche – The English Patient as Hanna; Barbara Hershey – The Portrait of a Lady as Madame Serena Merle; Marianne Jean-Baptiste – Secrets & Lies as Hortense Cumberbatch; Marion Ross – The Evening Star as Rose Dunlop
Best Director	Best Screenplay
Miloš Forman – The People vs. Larry Flynt: Joel Coen – Fargo; Scott Hicks – Shine; Anthony Minghella – The English Patient; Alan Parker – Evita	The People vs. Larry Flynt – Scott Alexander and Larry Karaszewski: The English Patient – Anthony Minghella; Fargo – Joel Coen and Ethan Coen; Lone Star – John Sayles; Shine – Jan Sardi
Best Original Score	Best Original Song
Gabriel Yared – The English Patient: Elliot Goldenthal – Michael Collins; Marvin Hamlisch – The Mirror Has Two Faces; David Hirschfelder – Shine; Alan Menken – The Hunchback of Notre Dame	"You Must Love Me" by Madonna – Evita: "Because You Loved Me" by Celine Dion – Up Close and Personal; "For the First Time" – One Fine Day; "I Finally Found Someone" by Barbra Streisand & Bryan Adams – The Mirror Has Two Faces; "That Thing You Do!" by The Wonders – That Thing You Do!
Best Foreign Language Film	
Kolya (Kolja) • Czech Republic: The Eighth Day (Le huitième jour) • Belgium; Moon and the Other (Luna e l'altra) • Italy; Prisoner of the Mountains (Kavkazskiy plennik) • Russia; Ridicule • France	

The following films received multiple nominations:

Nominations	Title
7	The English Patient
5	Evita
5	The People vs. Larry Flynt
5	Shine
4	The Mirror Has Two Faces
4	Fargo
3	Jerry Maguire
3	Secrets & Lies
2	The Birdcage
2	Breaking the Waves
2	The Crucible
2	Michael Collins

The following films received multiple wins:

Wins	Film
3	Evita
2	The English Patient
2	The People vs. Larry Flynt

=== Television ===
Best Television Series
Best Series - Drama	Best Series - Comedy or Musical
The X-Files: Chicago Hope; ER; NYPD Blue; Party of Five	3rd Rock from the Sun: Frasier; Friends; The Larry Sanders Show; Mad About You; Seinfeld
Best Lead Actor in a Television Series
Best Actor - Drama Series	Best Actor - Comedy or Musical Series
David Duchovny – The X-Files: George Clooney – ER; Anthony Edwards – ER; Lance Henriksen – Millennium; Jimmy Smits – NYPD Blue	John Lithgow – 3rd Rock from the Sun: Tim Allen – Home Improvement; Michael J. Fox – Spin City; Kelsey Grammer – Frasier; Paul Reiser – Mad About You
Best Lead Actress in a Television Series
Best Actress - Drama Series	Best Actress - Comedy or Musical Series
Gillian Anderson – The X-Files: Christine Lahti – Chicago Hope; Heather Locklear – Melrose Place; Jane Seymour – Dr. Quinn, Medicine Woman; Sherry Stringfield – ER	Helen Hunt – Mad About You: Brett Butler – Grace Under Fire; Fran Drescher – The Nanny; Cybill Shepherd – Cybill; Brooke Shields – Suddenly Susan; Tracey Ullman – Tracey Takes On...
Best Supporting Performance - Series, Miniseries or Television Film
Best Supporting Actor - Series, Miniseries or Television Film	Best Supporting Actress - Series, Miniseries or Television Film
Ian McKellen – Rasputin: Dark Servant of Destiny: David Paymer – Crime of the Century; David Hyde Pierce – Frasier; Anthony Quinn – Gotti; Noah Wyle – ER	Kathy Bates – The Late Shift: Cher – If These Walls Could Talk; Christine Baranski – Cybill; Kristen Johnston – 3rd Rock from the Sun; Greta Scacchi – Rasputin: Dark Servant of Destiny
Best Actor - Miniseries or Television Film	Best Actress - Miniseries or Television Film
Alan Rickman – Rasputin: Dark Servant of Destiny: Armand Assante – Gotti; Beau Bridges – Losing Chase; Stephen Rea – Crime of the Century; James Woods – The Summer of Ben Tyler	Helen Mirren – Losing Chase: Ashley Judd – Norma Jean & Marilyn; Demi Moore – If These Walls Could Talk; Isabella Rossellini – Crime of the Century; Mira Sorvino – Norma Jean & Marilyn
Best Miniseries or Television Film	
Rasputin: Dark Servant of Destiny: Crime of the Century; Gotti; Hidden in America; If These Walls Could Talk; Losing Chase	

The following programs received multiple nominations:

Nominations	Title
5	ER
4	Crime of the Century
4	Rasputin: Dark Servant of Destiny
3	3rd Rock from the Sun
3	Frasier
3	Gotti
3	If These Walls Could Talk
3	Mad About You
3	The X-Files
2	Chicago Hope
2	Cybill
2	Losing Chase
2	Norma Jean & Marilyn
2	NYPD Blue

The following programs received multiple wins

Wins	Series
3	The X-Files
3	Rasputin: Dark Servant of Destiny
2	3rd Rock from the Sun

== Ceremony ==
=== Presenters ===
- Halle Berry
- Jeff Bridges
- Nicolas Cage
- Drew Carey
- Tom Cruise
- Jane Curtin
- Ted Danson
- Faye Dunaway
- Mel Gibson
- Kelsey Grammer
- Nicole Kidman
- Heather Locklear
- Jada Pinkett Smith
- Cybill Shepherd
- Gary Sinise
- Mira Sorvino
- Sharon Stone
- John Travolta
- Jon Voight
- Christopher Walken

=== Cecil B. DeMille Award ===
Dustin Hoffman

== Awards breakdown ==
The following networks received multiple nominations:

Nominations	Network
18	HBO
15	NBC
6	CBS
6	Fox
5	ABC
3	Showtime

The following networks received multiple wins:

Wins	Network
3	Fox
2	HBO
2	NBC

== See also ==
- 69th Academy Awards
- 17th Golden Raspberry Awards
- 3rd Screen Actors Guild Awards
- 48th Primetime Emmy Awards
- 49th Primetime Emmy Awards
- 50th British Academy Film Awards
- 51st Tony Awards
- 1996 in film
- 1996 in American television
