= The English Patient (film) =

1996 drama film directed by Anthony Minghella

- Theatrical release poster
- Directed by: Anthony Minghella
- Screenplay by: Anthony Minghella
- Based on: The English Patient by Michael Ondaatje
- Produced by: Saul Zaentz
- Starring: Ralph Fiennes; Juliette Binoche; Willem Dafoe; Kristin Scott Thomas; Naveen Andrews; Colin Firth; Julian Wadham; Jürgen Prochnow
- Cinematography: John Seale
- Edited by: Walter Murch
- Music by: Gabriel Yared
- Production company: Tiger Moth Productions
- Distributed by: Miramax Films
- Release date: November 15, 1996
- Running time: 162 minutes
- Countries: United States; United Kingdom
- Languages: English; German; Italian; Arabic
- Budget: $27–43 million
- Box office: $232 million

The English Patient is a 1996 epic romantic war drama film directed by Anthony Minghella from his own script based on the 1992 novel by Michael Ondaatje, and produced by Saul Zaentz. The film stars Ralph Fiennes and Kristin Scott Thomas alongside Juliette Binoche, Willem Dafoe, Naveen Andrews and Colin Firth in supporting roles.

The protagonist of the title, a man burned beyond recognition who speaks with an English accent, recalls his history in a series of flashbacks, revealing to the audience his true identity and the love affair in which he was involved before the war. The film ends with an onscreen statement that it is a fictionalized account of László Almásy (died 1951) and other historical figures and events. The English Patient was released by Miramax Films on November 15, 1996. The film received widespread critical acclaim and emerged as a major commercial success at the box-office.

The film received twelve nominations at the 69th Academy Awards, winning nine, including Best Picture, Best Director for Minghella, and Best Supporting Actress for Binoche. It was also the first to receive a Best Editing Oscar for a digitally edited film. Ralph Fiennes, playing the titular character, and Kristin Scott Thomas were Oscar-nominated for their performances. The film also won six BAFTA Awards and two Golden Globes. The British Film Institute ranked The English Patient the 55th-greatest British film of the 20th century. The American Film Institute ranked it the 56th-greatest love story of all time.

== Plot ==
German gunners shoot down a British biplane, containing a pilot and a slumped down woman, flying across the desert. A group of Bedouin pulls the badly burned pilot from the wreckage, rescuing him.

Hana, a French-Canadian Royal Canadian Army Medical Corps nurse, learns from a wounded soldier that her boyfriend has been killed. In October 1944 Italy, she is caring for a dying, severely burned patient who speaks with an English accent and says he cannot remember his name. His only possession is a copy of Herodotus' Histories, with personal notes, pictures, and mementos stored inside.

When a fellow nurse is killed in front of her, Hana decides she's a curse to her loved ones. Her hospital unit is being relocated, but she gains permission to settle in a bombed-out monastery with her patient, as he is likely not to survive the move. She's joined by Lieutenant Kip Singh, a Sikh sapper in the British Army posted with Sergeant Hardy to clear German mines and booby traps, and David Caravaggio, a Canadian Intelligence Corps operative who was tortured in German captivity. Caravaggio questions the patient, drawing out details of his past while Hana and Kip begin a love affair.

In the late 1930s, Hungarian cartographer Count László Almásy is exploring a region of the Sahara as part of a Royal Geographical Society archeological and surveying expedition, which includes his good friend Englishman Peter Madox, and British couple Geoffrey and Katharine Clifton, who conduct aerial surveys from their plane.

Almásy discovers the location of the ancient Cave of Swimmers, containing cave paintings. As the group documents the find, Almásy and Katharine fall in love. He writes about her in notes folded into his book, which she discovers when he awkwardly accepts two watercolours of the cave walls and asks her to paste them into the book.

They return to Cairo and begin an affair, while the group arranges for more detailed archaeological surveys of the cave and surrounding area. Almásy buys her a silver thimble as a gift. Geoffrey secretly watches her from his car and realizes she is being unfaithful. Later, Katharine breaks it off, saying she cannot continue. Almásy takes it badly. When the geographic projects are halted by the onset of the war, Madox leaves his Tiger Moth airplane at Kufra Oasis and returns to Britain.

Caravaggio seeks revenge for his injuries, killing the German interrogator who cut his thumbs off and the spy who betrayed him, and seeks out whoever provided maps to the Germans, allowing them to infiltrate Cairo. He confronts Almásy about the Cliftons' death, and he concedes "Maybe ... I did".

Hana overhears Almásy telling Caravaggio about packing camp in 1941 when Geoffrey arrives in the biplane. He aims at Almásy, who jumps out of the way, and crashes. Almásy finds Geoffrey dead at the controls and Katharine badly injured in the front seat. It was an attempted double murder-suicide, as Geoffrey had uncovered their affair. Almásy carries Katharine to the Cave of Swimmers. He observes that she is still wearing the thimble he gave her and she declares she has always loved him.

Leaving her with provisions and his book, Almásy walks three days across the desert to British-held El Tag. He asks for help to rescue her, but a young officer detains him on suspicion of being a spy. Transported away by train, Almásy escapes and encounters a German army unit which takes him to the Kufra Oasis, where Madox has hidden his plane. Exchanging maps for fuel, Almásy flies to the cave, finds Katharine dead, and is shot down flying her body away. After hearing the story, Caravaggio abandons his quest for revenge.

The war ends and Kip is reposted and agrees with Hana they'll meet again. Almásy tells her he's had enough by pushing vials of morphine towards her. Though distraught, Hana grants his wish, administering a lethal dose. As he drifts to sleep, she reads him Katharine's final letter, written while alone in the cave. The next morning, Hana goes with Caravaggio to Florence, clutching Almásy's book.

== Cast ==
- Ralph Fiennes as Almásy
- Juliette Binoche as Hana
- Willem Dafoe as Caravaggio
- Kristin Scott Thomas as Katharine Clifton
- Naveen Andrews as Kip
- Colin Firth as Geoffrey Clifton
- Julian Wadham as Madox
- Jürgen Prochnow as Major Muller
- Kevin Whately as Hardy
- Clive Merrison as Fenelon-Barnes
- Nino Castelnuovo as D'Agostino
- Hichem Rostom as Fouad
- Peter Rühring as Bermann
- Torri Higginson as Mary
- Liisa Repo-Martell as Jan

== Production ==
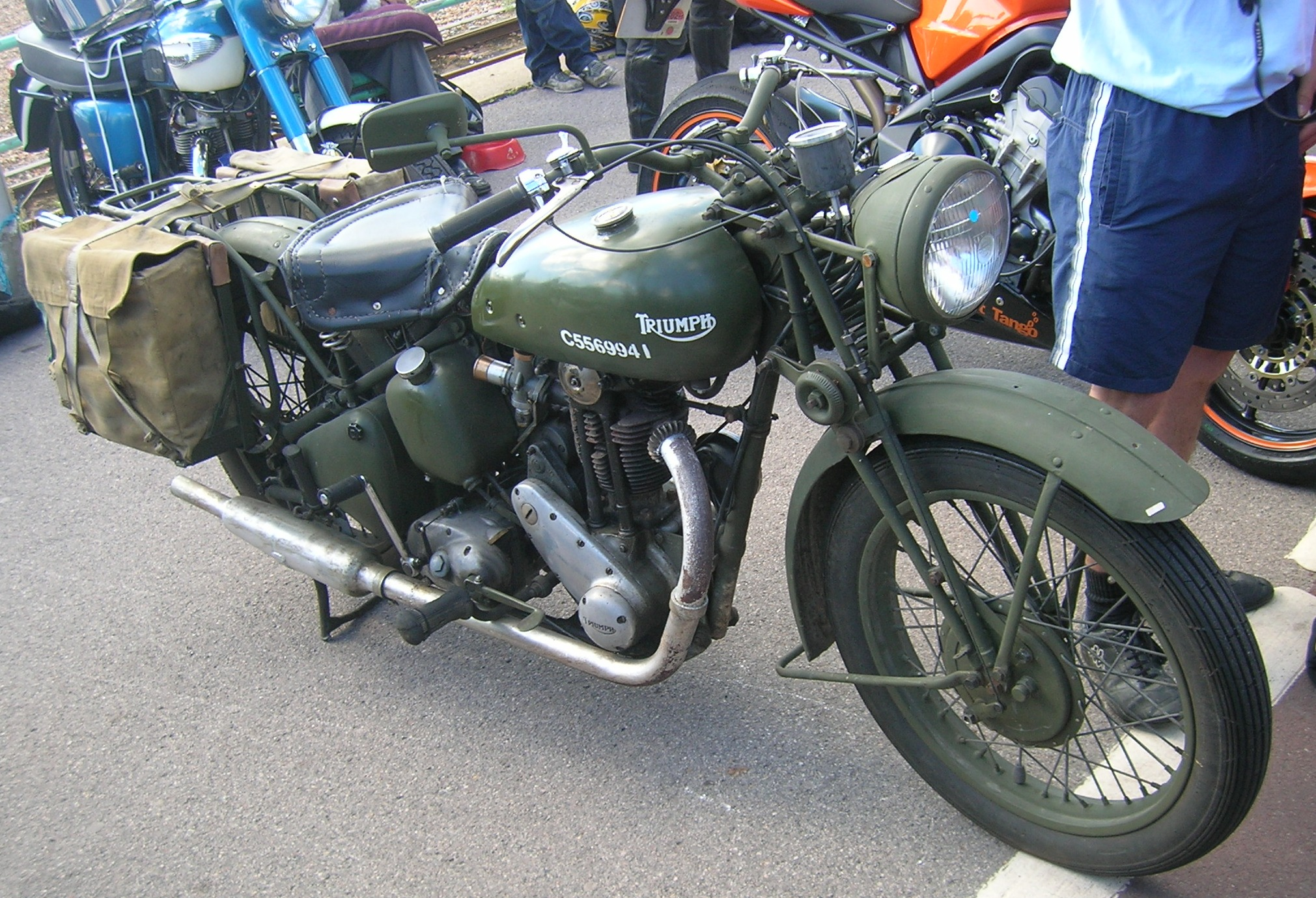
Triumph 3HW 350cc motorcycle specified in the novel as Kip's choice of transport and used in the film

Saul Zaentz was interested in working with Anthony Minghella after he saw Minghella's film Truly, Madly, Deeply (1990); Minghella brought this project to Zaentz's attention. Michael Ondaatje, the Sri Lankan-born Canadian author of the novel, worked closely with the filmmakers. According to Minghella, during the development of the project with 20th Century Fox, the "studio wanted the insurance policy of so-called bigger" actors. Zaentz recalled, "they'd look at you and say, 'Could we cast Demi Moore in the role'?" After months of disputes with Fox, the studio pulled out just three weeks before production was to begin and Harvey Weinstein came in and acquired worldwide rights for Miramax Films for $27.5 million. After Miramax Films became involved, Minghella's preference for Scott Thomas in the role of Katharine was honored.

To help the film get made, cast and crew agreed to salary deferrals totalling $10 million and Zaentz met the remainder of the production costs. Including the deferred costs, Variety reported the production costs at $43 million. The deferments were due to be paid after the film broke even. But, although the actors received a deferred payment of $5 million, more than three years after release, others were still waiting for their deferred salaries, subject to an audit of the figures. Zaentz sued Miramax Films in 2006, claiming $20 million, but the case was still unresolved when Zaentz died in 2014.

The film was shot on location in Tunisia and Italy.

The Conversations: Walter Murch and the Art of Editing Film by Michael Ondaatje is based on the conversations between the author and film editor. Murch, with a career that already included such complex works as the Godfather trilogy, The Conversation, and Apocalypse Now, dreaded the task of editing the film with multiple flashbacks and time frames. Once he began, the possibilities became apparent, some of which took him away from the order of the original script. A reel without sound was made so scene change visuals would be consistent with the quality of the aural aspect between the two. The final cut features over 40 temporal transitions. It was during this time that Murch met Ondaatje and they were able to exchange thoughts about editing the film.

In the film, two types of aircraft were used: a De Havilland D.H.82 Tiger Moth and a Boeing-Stearman Model 75. Both are biplanes. The camp crash scene was made with a ½-size scale model.

The Hungarian folk song "Szerelem, Szerelem", performed by Muzsikás featuring Márta Sebestyén, was featured in the film.

== Reception ==
The English Patient received widespread critical acclaim, and emerged as a major commercial success at the box-office, and received nine Academy Awards, six BAFTA awards, and two Golden Globe Awards.

Janet Maslin of The New York Times called the movie "a stunning feat of literary adaptation as well as a purely cinematic triumph". In The New Yorker, Anthony Lane argues that "the triumph of the film lies not just in the force and the range of the performances—the crisp sweetness of Scott Thomas, say, versus the raw volatility of Binoche—but in Minghella's creation of an intimate epic: vast landscapes mingle with the minute details of desire, and the combination is transfixing".

The film has a rating of 86% on Rotten Tomatoes based on 91 reviews, with an average of 7.90/10. The website's critical consensus states, "Though it suffers from excessive length and ambition, director Minghella's adaptation of the Michael Ondaatje novel is complex, powerful, and moving." The film also has a rating of 87/100 on Metacritic, based on 31 critical reviews. Chicago Sun Times critic Roger Ebert gave the film a four-star rating, saying "it's the kind of movie you can see twice – first for the questions, the second time for the answers". In his movie guide, Leonard Maltin rated the film 3 1/2 out of 4, calling it "a mesmerizing adaptation" of Ondaatje's novel, saying "Fiennes and Scott Thomas are perfectly matched", and he concluded by calling the film "an exceptional achievement all around". In 2021, The Boston Globe called the movie a "masterpiece" in a 25-year anniversary review.

Audiences surveyed by CinemaScore gave the film a grade of "A−" on a scale of A+ to F.

It became the highest-grossing film in the history of Miramax with a worldwide gross of $232 million.

The film is referred to in the Seinfeld episode "The English Patient", where the character Elaine is shunned by her friends and co-workers for disliking the film.

== Accolades ==
| Award | Category | Nominee(s) | Result | Ref. |
|---|---|---|---|---|
| Academy Awards | Best Picture | Saul Zaentz | Won | |
| Academy Awards | Best Director | Anthony Minghella | Won | |
| Academy Awards | Best Actor | Ralph Fiennes | Nominated | |
| Academy Awards | Best Actress | Kristin Scott Thomas | Nominated | |
| Academy Awards | Best Supporting Actress | Juliette Binoche | Won | |
| Academy Awards | Best Screenplay – Based on Material Previously Produced or Published | Anthony Minghella | Nominated | |
| Academy Awards | Best Art Direction | Art Direction: Stuart Craig; Set Decoration: Stephenie McMillan | Won | |
| Academy Awards | Best Cinematography | John Seale | Won | |
| Academy Awards | Best Costume Design | Ann Roth | Won | |
| Academy Awards | Best Film Editing | Walter Murch | Won | |
| Academy Awards | Best Original Dramatic Score | Gabriel Yared | Won | |
| Academy Awards | Best Sound | Walter Murch, Mark Berger, David Parker, and Christopher Newman | Won | |
| American Cinema Editors Awards | Best Edited Feature Film | Walter Murch | Won | |
| American Society of Cinematographers Awards | Outstanding Achievement in Cinematography in Theatrical Releases | John Seale | Won | |
| Art Directors Guild Awards | Excellence in Production Design – Feature Film | Stuart Craig and Aurelio Crugnola | Won | |
| Artios Awards | Outstanding Achievement in Feature Film Casting – Drama | David Rubin | Nominated | |
| Australian Film Institute Awards | Best Foreign Film | Saul Zaentz | Nominated | |
| Berlin International Film Festival | Golden Bear | Anthony Minghella | Nominated | |
| Berlin International Film Festival | Best Actress | Juliette Binoche | Won | |
| Boston Society of Film Critics Awards | Best Cinematography | John Seale | Won | |
| British Academy Film Awards | Best Film | Saul Zaentz and Anthony Minghella | Won | |
| British Academy Film Awards | Best Direction | Anthony Minghella | Nominated | |
| British Academy Film Awards | Best Actor in a Leading Role | Ralph Fiennes | Nominated | |
| British Academy Film Awards | Best Actress in a Leading Role | Kristin Scott Thomas | Nominated | |
| British Academy Film Awards | Best Actress in a Supporting Role | Juliette Binoche | Won | |
| British Academy Film Awards | Best Screenplay – Adapted | Anthony Minghella | Won | |
| British Academy Film Awards | Best Cinematography | John Seale | Won | |
| British Academy Film Awards | Best Costume Design | Ann Roth | Nominated | |
| British Academy Film Awards | Best Editing | Walter Murch | Won | |
| British Academy Film Awards | Best Make Up/Hair | Fabrizio Sforza and Nigel Booth | Nominated | |
| British Academy Film Awards | Best Original Music | Gabriel Yared | Won | |
| British Academy Film Awards | Best Production Design | Stuart Craig | Nominated | |
| British Academy Film Awards | Best Sound | Mark Berger, Pat Jackson, Walter Murch, Chris Newman, David Parker, and Ivan Sharrock | Nominated | |
| British Society of Cinematographers Awards | Best Cinematography in a Theatrical Feature Film | John Seale | Nominated | |
| Cabourg Film Festival | Best Actress | Juliette Binoche | Won | |
| César Awards | Best Foreign Film | Anthony Minghella | Nominated | |
| Chicago Film Critics Association Awards | Best Film | | Nominated | |
| Chicago Film Critics Association Awards | Best Supporting Actress | Juliette Binoche | Nominated | |
| Chicago Film Critics Association Awards | Best Cinematography | John Seale | Won | |
| Chlotrudis Awards | Best Supporting Actor | Naveen Andrews | Nominated | |
| Chlotrudis Awards | Best Supporting Actress | Juliette Binoche | Won (Note: Tied with Mary Tyler Moore for Flirting with Disaster.) | |
| Cinema Audio Society Awards | Outstanding Achievement in Sound Mixing for Motion Pictures | Christopher Newman, Walter Murch, Mark Berger, and David Parker | Won | |
| Critics' Choice Awards | Best Picture | | Nominated | |
| Critics' Choice Awards | Best Director | Anthony Minghella | Won | |
| Critics' Choice Awards | Best Screenplay | Anthony Minghella | Won | |
| Czech Lion Awards | Best Foreign Film | Anthony Minghella | Nominated | |
| Dallas–Fort Worth Film Critics Association Awards | Best Picture | | Nominated | |
| Dallas–Fort Worth Film Critics Association Awards | Best Supporting Actress | Juliette Binoche | Won | |
| Dallas–Fort Worth Film Critics Association Awards | Best Cinematography | John Seale | Won | |
| Directors Guild of America Awards | Outstanding Directorial Achievement in Motion Pictures | Anthony Minghella | Won | |
| Empire Awards | Best British Director | Anthony Minghella | Won | |
| European Film Awards | European Film of the Year | Saul Zaentz | Nominated | |
| European Film Awards | European Actress of the Year | Juliette Binoche | Won | |
| European Film Awards | European Cinematographer of the Year | John Seale | Won | |
| Florida Film Critics Circle Awards | Best Cinematography | John Seale | Won | |
| Golden Globe Awards | Best Motion Picture – Drama | | Won | |
| Golden Globe Awards | Best Actor in a Motion Picture – Drama | Ralph Fiennes | Nominated | |
| Golden Globe Awards | Best Actress in a Motion Picture – Drama | Kristin Scott Thomas | Nominated | |
| Golden Globe Awards | Best Supporting Actress – Motion Picture | Juliette Binoche | Nominated | |
| Golden Globe Awards | Best Director – Motion Picture | Anthony Minghella | Nominated | |
| Golden Globe Awards | Best Screenplay – Motion Picture | Anthony Minghella | Nominated | |
| Golden Globe Awards | Best Original Score – Motion Picture | Gabriel Yared | Won | |
| Golden Reel Awards | Motion Picture Feature Films: Music Editing | Robert Randles | Won | |
| Golden Screen Awards | | | Won | |
| Goya Awards | Best European Film | Anthony Minghella | Nominated | |
| Grammy Awards | Best Instrumental Composition Written for a Motion Picture or for Television | The English Patient – Gabriel Yared | Won | |
| Japan Academy Film Prize | Outstanding Foreign Language Film | | Nominated | |
| London Film Critics Circle Awards | British Director of the Year | Anthony Minghella | Won | |
| Los Angeles Film Critics Association Awards | Best Cinematography | John Seale | Won (Note: Tied with Chris Menges for Michael Collins.) | |
| Mainichi Film Awards | Best Foreign Language Film | Anthony Minghella | Won | |
| National Board of Review Awards | Top Ten Films | | 2nd Place | |
| National Board of Review Awards | Best Supporting Actress | Juliette Binoche | Won (Tied) | |
| National Board of Review Awards | Best Supporting Actress | Kristin Scott Thomas | Won (Tied) | |
| National Society of Film Critics Awards | Best Supporting Actress | Kristin Scott Thomas | 3rd Place | |
| National Society of Film Critics Awards | Best Cinematography | John Seale | 3rd Place | |
| Nikkan Sports Film Awards | Best Foreign Film | | Won | |
| Online Film & Television Association Awards | Best Picture | Saul Zaentz | Won | |
| Online Film & Television Association Awards | Best Drama Picture | Saul Zaentz | Won | |
| Online Film & Television Association Awards | Best Director | Anthony Minghella | Nominated | |
| Online Film & Television Association Awards | Best Actor | Ralph Fiennes | Nominated | |
| Online Film & Television Association Awards | Best Drama Actor | Ralph Fiennes | Nominated | |
| Online Film & Television Association Awards | Best Actress | Kristin Scott Thomas | Nominated | |
| Online Film & Television Association Awards | Best Drama Actress | Kristin Scott Thomas | Nominated | |
| Online Film & Television Association Awards | Best Supporting Actress | Juliette Binoche | Nominated | |
| Online Film & Television Association Awards | Best Screenplay – Based on Material from Another Medium | Anthony Minghella | Won | |
| Online Film & Television Association Awards | Best Cinematography | John Seale | Won | |
| Online Film & Television Association Awards | Best Film Editing | Walter Murch | Nominated | |
| Online Film & Television Association Awards | Best Makeup | Fabrizio Sforza and Nigel Booth | Nominated | |
| Online Film & Television Association Awards | Best Production Design | Stuart Craig and Stephanie McMillan | Nominated | |
| Online Film & Television Association Awards | Best Score | Gabriel Yared | Nominated | |
| Producers Guild of America Awards | Outstanding Producer of Theatrical Motion Pictures | Saul Zaentz | Won | |
| Producers Guild of America Awards | Visionary Award – Theatrical Motion Pictures | Saul Zaentz | Won | |
| Satellite Awards | Best Motion Picture – Drama | | Nominated | |
| Satellite Awards | Best Director | Anthony Minghella | Nominated | |
| Satellite Awards | Best Actor in a Motion Picture – Drama | Ralph Fiennes | Nominated | |
| Satellite Awards | Best Actress in a Motion Picture – Drama | Kristin Scott Thomas | Nominated | |
| Satellite Awards | Best Screenplay – Adapted | Anthony Minghella | Won | |
| Satellite Awards | Best Art Direction | Stuart Craig | Nominated | |
| Satellite Awards | Best Cinematography | John Seale | Won | |
| Satellite Awards | Best Film Editing | Walter Murch | Nominated | |
| Satellite Awards | Best Original Score | Gabriel Yared | Won | |
| Screen Actors Guild Awards | Outstanding Performance by a Cast in a Motion Picture | Naveen Andrews, Juliette Binoche, Willem Dafoe, Ralph Fiennes, Colin Firth, Jürgen Prochnow, Kristin Scott Thomas, and Julian Wadham | Nominated | |
| Screen Actors Guild Awards | Outstanding Performance by a Male Actor in a Leading Role | Ralph Fiennes | Nominated | |
| Screen Actors Guild Awards | Outstanding Performance by a Female Actor in a Leading Role | Kristin Scott Thomas | Nominated | |
| Screen Actors Guild Awards | Outstanding Performance by a Female Actor in a Supporting Role | Juliette Binoche | Nominated | |
| Society of Texas Film Critics Awards | Best Screenplay – Adapted | Anthony Minghella | Won | |
| Southeastern Film Critics Association Awards | Best Picture | | 3rd Place | |
| Southeastern Film Critics Association Awards | Best Actor | Ralph Fiennes | Runner-up | |
| Southeastern Film Critics Association Awards | Best Supporting Actress | Juliette Binoche | Runner-up | |
| Southeastern Film Critics Association Awards | Best Screenplay | Anthony Minghella | Won | |
| Turkish Film Critics Association Awards | Best Foreign Film | | 16th Place | |
| USC Scripter Awards | | Anthony Minghella (screenwriter); Michael Ondaatje (author) | Won | |
| Writers Guild of America Awards | Best Screenplay – Based on Material Previously Produced or Published | Anthony Minghella | Nominated | |

=== Lists ===
| Year | Category | Distinction |
|---|---|---|
| 1999 | BFI Top 100 British films | #55 |
| 2002 | AFI's 100 Years...100 Passions | #56 |

In 2009, The English Patient was included in The Guardian's 25 best British films of the last 25 years list.

== Home media and rights ==
In the US, The English Patient was first released on VHS on September 23, 1997, by Buena Vista Home Entertainment (under the Miramax Home Entertainment banner). The film received two separate US LaserDisc releases; the first on October 1, 1997 and the second on November 12, 1997. The first US LaserDisc release featured DTS Digital Surround, while the second was a Criterion Collection edition. In 1997, the film also received LaserDisc releases in France, Hong Kong, Singapore and Spain. The film's first US DVD release on March 24, 1998 was presented in widescreen, while the second release on June 29, 2004 was a 2-Disc edition under the "Miramax's Collector's Edition" line.

In December 2010, Miramax was sold by The Walt Disney Company, their owners since 1993. That same month, the studio was taken over by private equity firm Filmyard Holdings. Filmyard licensed the home media rights for most of Miramax's notable titles to Lionsgate, with lower profile titles being licensed to Echo Bridge Entertainment. On January 31, 2012, The English Patient received a Blu-ray release through Lionsgate Home Entertainment. In 2011, Filmyard Holdings licensed the Miramax library to streamer Netflix. This streaming deal included The English Patient, and ran for five years, eventually ending on June 1, 2016.

Filmyard Holdings sold Miramax to Qatari company beIN Media Group in March 2016. In April 2020, ViacomCBS (now known as Paramount Skydance) acquired the rights to Miramax's library, after buying a 49% stake in the studio from beIN. The English Patient is among the 700 titles they acquired in the deal, and since April 2020, the film has been distributed by Paramount Pictures. The deal also included the much smaller library of Miramax Television, as well as including a first look agreement with beIN/Miramax, which allows Paramount to release any future projects based on Miramax properties.

In late 2020, Paramount Home Entertainment started reissuing many of the Miramax titles they had acquired, and on February 23, 2021, they reissued The English Patient on Blu-ray. In March 2021, Paramount Home Entertainment also released The English Patient on a ten film Blu-ray set, featuring nine other Paramount-owned films which won Academy Award for Best Picture. Among the other films included were American Beauty and Gladiator, which Paramount acquired in 2006, via their acquisition of DreamWorks' live-action film library (consisting of 59 films by that point).

The film was made available on Paramount's subscription streaming service Paramount+, which launched in March 2021, in addition to being made available on Paramount's free streaming service Pluto TV.

The film will be reissued by the Criterion Collection on Ultra HD Blu-ray and Blu-ray on December 8, 2026, using a new 4K restoration.

== Television adaptation ==
In August 2021, another adaptation of the novel was in early development for a new BBC television series, co-produced by Miramax Television and Paramount Television Studios. However, in March 2023, it was reported that it was no longer moving forward.

== See also ==
- BFI Top 100 British films

== Bibliography ==
- Blakesley, David (2007). "Mapping the other: The English Patient, colonial rhetoric, and cinematic representation". The Terministic Screen: Rhetorical Perspectives on Film. Southern Illinois University Press. ISBN 978-0-8093-2488-0.
- Deer, Patrick (2005). "Defusing The English Patient". In Stam, Robert; Raengo, Alessandra (eds.). Literature and Film: A Guide to the Theory and Practice of Film Adaptation. Blackwell. ISBN 0-631-23054-8.
- Minghella, Anthony (1997). The English Patient: A Screenplay by Anthony Minghella. Methuen Publishing. ISBN 0-413-71500-0.
- Thomas, Bronwen (2000). "Piecing together a mirage: Adapting The English patient for the screen". In Giddings, Robert; Sheen, Erica (eds.). The Classic Novel from Page to Screen. Manchester University Press. ISBN 0-7190-5230-0.
- Yared, Gabriel (2007). Gabriel Yared's The English Patient: A Film Score Guide. The Scarecrow Press. ISBN 978-0-8108-5910-4.
