= The English Patient (soundtrack) =

Soundtrack album by Gabriel Yared
- Released: 1996
- Recorded: 1996
- Genre: Soundtrack
- Label: Fantasy Records

Gabriel Yared chronology
Black for Remembrance (1995)	The English Patient (1996)	Hercule et Sherlock (1996)

Professional ratings
Review scores
Source	Rating
Allmusic	link
SoundtrackNet	link

The English Patient is the original soundtrack, on the Fantasy Records label, of the 1996 Academy Award- and Golden Globe-winning film The English Patient starring Ralph Fiennes, Kristin Scott Thomas, Willem Dafoe, Juliette Binoche and Colin Firth. The original score and songs were composed by Gabriel Yared.

The Academy of St Martin in the Fields is conducted by Harry Rabinowitz, with piano solos by John Constable, recorded at Air Studios, London, and at YAD Music, Paris. The Shepheard's Hotel Jazz Orchestra, conducted by Ronnie Hazelhurst, was recorded at Angel Recording Studios, London.

The album won the four major soundtrack awards: the Academy Award (Best Dramatic Score), the Golden Globe (Best Original Score), the BAFTA Award (Best Film Music) and the Grammy Award (Best Instrumental Composition Written for a Motion Picture or for Television).

== Track listing ==
1. The English Patient 3:30
2. A Retreat 1:21
3. Rupert Bear 1:22
4. What Else Do You Love? 1:00
5. Why Picton? 1:04
6. Cheek To Cheek 3:15 (sung by Fred Astaire)
7. Kip's Lights 1:24
8. Hana's Curse 2:06
9. I'll Always Go Back To That Church 1:48
10. Black Nights 1:53
11. Swoon, I'll Catch You 1:47
12. Am I K. In Your Book? 0:55
13. Let Me Come In! 2:35
14. Wang Wang Blues 2:47 (played by Benny Goodman)
15. Conventino Di Sant' Anna 9:09
16. Herodotus 1:04
17. Szerelem, szerelem 4:32 (with the singer Márta Sebestyén)
18. Ask Your Saint Who He's Killed 1:04
19. One O'Clock Jump 3:10 (Benny Goodman)
20. I'll Be Back 4:00
21. Let Me Tell You About Winds 0:55
22. Read Me To Sleep 4:56
23. The Cave Of Swimmers 1:55
24. Where or When 2:14 (with the Shepheard's Hotel Jazz Orchestra)
25. Aria From The Goldberg Variations 2:57 (played by Julie Steinberg)
26. Cheek To Cheek 3:42 (sung by Ella Fitzgerald)
27. As Far As Florence 5:16
28. Én csak azt csodálom (Lullaby For Katharine) 1:07
- Total Time: 72:48

== Charts ==
=== Weekly charts ===
Chart (1997)	Peak position
Hungarian Albums (MAHASZ)	30

== Certifications ==
Region	Certification	Certified units/sales
Belgium (BRMA)	Gold	25,000^{*}
United Kingdom (BPI)	Silver	60,000^{*}
United States	—	211,000
^{*} Sales figures based on certification alone.
