= The Nutty Professor (film series) =

- Official franchise logo, as released in 1996
- Based on: Characters created by Jerry Lewis
- Country: United States
- Language: English
- Budget: ~$146,630,000 (Total of 3 films)
- Box office: ~$459,300,909 (Total of 3 films) (Note: These figures are based on the available numbers for the theatrical films. Though there are a total four movies released, there is no financial information publicly available for the animated film.)

The Nutty Professor film series consists of American science fiction-slapstick comedies, including three theatrical films, one straight-to-home video release, and a musical stage play. Based on an original story by Jerry Lewis, inspired loosely by Strange Case of Dr. Jekyll and Mr. Hyde (1886) by Robert Louis Stevenson.

The plot of each installment centers around individuals with genius-level Intelligence, yet awkward and nerdy social skills. Upon meeting beautiful women, they develop potions that transform them into attractive, confident, albeit villainous alternate personalities who attempt to take over their original counterparts. The series explores the concept of self worth.

The original film was a success both critically and financially, and has earned the status of being regarded as a comedy classic. It was ranked #99 by the American Film Institute on its 100 Years...100 Laughs list. A direct-sequel was eventually released in 2008, albeit an animated straight-to-home video release. Lewis reprised his role, though the movie centered around his grandson instead. Lewis continued involvement with the franchise as executive producer for the remake film and its sequel and then later served as director of a musical stage production in 2012.

The remake starring Eddie Murphy and released in 1996, was a success at the box office and received positive reviews from critics. A sequel was released in 2000 to mixed critical reception. Though it fared well financially, it was far from the success of its predecessor.

A reboot is in development, from Project X Entertainment.

== Film ==
Film	U.S. release date	Director(s)	Screenwriter(s)	Story by	Producer(s)
The Nutty Professor	June 4, 1963	Jerry Lewis	Jerry Lewis & Bill Richmond	Jerry Lewis & Bill Richmond	Arthur P. Schmidt & Ernest D. Glucksman
The Nutty Professor	June 28, 1996	Tom Shadyac	Tom Shadyac, Steve Oedekerk, David Sheffield & Barry W. Blaustein		Brian Grazer & Russell Simmons
Nutty Professor II: The Klumps	July 28, 2000	Peter Segal	Paul Weitz, Chris Weitz, David Sheffield & Barry W. Blaustein	Steve Oedekerk, David Sheffield & Barry W. Blaustein	Brian Grazer
The Nutty Professor: Facing the Fear	November 25, 2008	Paul Taylor & Logan McPherson	Evan Spiliotopoulos	Evan Spiliotopoulos	George Paige & Barbara Zelinski
Untitled reboot	TBA	TBA	TBA	TBA	Paul Neinstein, William Sherak & James Vanderbilt

=== The Nutty Professor (1963) ===
Professor Julius Kelp is a brilliant science teacher, at a university. However, he has a problem with attracting women due to his clumsy, awkward, inarticulate nature. Women deem him as unattractive. Kelp becomes obsessed with impressing a beautiful student named Stella. With his background in chemistry, Kelp decides to develop a potion that will change him into a different person. His new suave alter ego named Buddy Love, is challenged with winning Stella's affections before his short-supply of potion is depleted.

Film historians regard The Nutty Professor as the most memorable film of Lewis’ long career. In 2004, the film was selected for preservation in the National Film Registry by the Library of Congress for being "culturally, historically or aesthetically significant."

=== The Nutty Professor (1996) ===
Brilliant and obese scientist Sherman Klump invents a miraculous weight-loss solution. After a date with chemistry student Carla Purty goes badly, a depressed Klump tries the solution on himself. Upon taking the potion, Klump instantly loses 250 pounds. The side effects, besides becoming physically fit include a second personality who calls himself Buddy Love and is obnoxiously self-assertive, conceited alternate personality. Buddy proves to be more popular than Sherman, but his arrogance and bad behavior quickly spiral out of control. During these series of events, Klump must decide whether he enjoys popularity, or values self-respect.

=== Nutty Professor II: The Klumps (2000) ===
After choosing to love himself, over his popular and assertive alternate personality, Professor Sherman Klump has found love in a beautiful and kind woman named Denise. In preparations for their wedding, his undesired alter-ego named Buddy Love begins taking over. Though Klump has ceased taking his self-improving potion, Love continues to present himself and is determined to stay. After a number of appearances, Klump extracts his alternate personality's genes and decides rid the world of his pesky partner, at the risk of his own psychological decline. A laboratory incident including the accidental combination of the genes with dog hair, result in Buddy Love taking on his own existence outside of Klump's body. Unaware of the Love's new existence, the engaged couple begin to perfect a new rejuvenation formula and their fortune seems assured, until Love appears and steals it. Professor Klump's cognitive abilities continue to decline. In a final effort to defeat Buddy Love, the Professor develops a new and more potent formula that will degenerate the villain back to his state of genetic material. Using Love's canine DNA against him, he defeats him with the use of a tennis ball covered in the new potion. As Klump slips away, Denise helps him drink the genetic matter, restoring his genius intellect and resetting everything back to normal. The pair continue to prepare for their wedding, and are married.

=== The Nutty Professor: Facing the Fear (2008) ===
As a CGI animation film, it serves as a legacy-sequel to the original film, and follows the workings of Julius Kelp's grandson.

Harold Kelp is an aspiring inventor, who struggles to perfect his experiments. Intimidated by his grandfather's legacy, Harold has dreams of his failure taking the form of a giant monster. After coming into conflict with a group of angry individuals involved in one of his demonstrations, Harold decides to attend a science academy run by his grandfather, Professor Julius Kelp. Upon arriving at the school, Harold meets a beautiful woman named Polly McGreggor, with whom he becomes infatuated. Determined to win her affection, Harold finds and takes his grandfather's secret potion. The elixir unleashes Harold's confident, self-loving alternate personality that calls himself Jack. Though initially popular with the fellow students, Jack's outrageous behavior gets out of control and causes more mischief than Harold had anticipated. Due to Harold's continued time evolving into Jack, his grades begin slipping. Learning of Harold's actions, Julius once again takes the potion to become Buddy Love. In his alternate form as Buddy Love, Julius teaches his grandson to appreciate who he is and to be comfortable in his own skin. Harold's anxieties are accidentally unleashed by one of Professor Kelp's inventions, as the visionary monster from his nightmares. Harold bravely faces his fears, and defeats the creature. In doing so, Harold says goodbye to Jack once and for all before sharing a kiss with Polly.

=== Reboot ===
In August 2020, it was announced that a reboot of The Nutty Professor franchise was in development. James Vanderbilt, William Sherak and Paul Neinstein serve as producers, while the search for additional talent is ongoing. The movie is under development from Project X Entertainment.

== Main cast and characters ==
List indicators

This section includes characters who will appear or have appeared in the franchise in main roles.

- An empty grey cell indicates the character was not in the film, or that the character's official presence has not yet been confirmed.
- ^{V} indicates a voice-only role.
- ^{Y} indicates a younger version of the character.

Characters	Films			
Characters	The Nutty Professor (1963)	The Nutty Professor (1996)	Nutty Professor ll: The Klumps	The Nutty Professor: Facing the Fear
Professor Julius Kelp Buddy Love	Jerry Lewis			Jerry Lewis^{V}
Stella Purdy	Stella Stevens			
Dr. Mortimer Warfield	Del Moore			
Millie Lemmon	Kathleen Freeman			
Warzewski	Med Flory			
Mr. Elmer Kelp	Howard Morris			
Mrs. Edwina Kelp	Elvia Allman			
Professor Sherman Klump Buddy Love		Eddie Murphy	Eddie Murphy (Note: Additionally, Buddy Love is portrayed by Myles Mason, Jeffrey Michael Freeman, Maurice Colquitt, and Kevin Michael Mondane as an infant.)	
Papa Cletus Klump		Eddie Murphy	Eddie Murphy	
Mama Anna Klump		Eddie Murphy	Eddie Murphy	
Grandma Ida Mae Jenson		Eddie Murphy	Eddie Murphy	
Ernie Klump, Sr.		Eddie Murphy	Eddie Murphy	
Lance Perkins		Eddie Murphy	Eddie Murphy	
Ernie Klump, Jr.		Jamal Mixon	Jamal Mixon	
Jason		John Ales	John Ales	
Dean Richmond		Larry Miller	Larry Miller	
Carla Purty		Jada Pinkett		
Reggie Warrington		Dave Chappelle		
Harlan Hartley		James Coburn		
Denise Gaines-Klump			Janet Jackson	
Leanne Guilford			Melinda McGraw	
Issac			Gabriel Williams	
Mr. Gaines			Richard Gant	
Mrs. Gaines			Anna Maria Horsford	
Harold Kelp Jack				Drake Bell^{V}
Robin				Tabitha St. Germain^{V}
Polly McGregor				Britt Irvin^{V}
Zeke				Logan McPherson^{V}
Ned				Logan McPherson^{V}
Brad				Andrew Francis^{V}
Tad				Andrew Francis^{V}
Fear Beast				Logan McPherson^{V}
Dean Von Wu				Brian Drummond^{V}

== Additional crew and production details ==
Film	Crew/Detail					
Film	Composer	Cinematographer	Editor(s)	Production companies	Distributing company	Running time
The Nutty Professor	Walter Scharf	W. Wallace Kelley	John Woodcock	Paramount Pictures, Jerry Lewis Films	Paramount Pictures	107 minutes
The Nutty Professor	David Newman	Julio Macat	Don Zimmerman	Imagine Entertainment, Brian Grazer Productions, Tom Shadyac Films	Universal Pictures	95 minutes
Nutty Professor II: The Klumps	David Newman	Dean Semler	William Kerr	Universal Pictures, Peter Segal Films, Imagine Entertainment, Brian Grazer Productions, Shady Acres Entertainment	Universal Pictures	106 minutes
The Nutty Professor: Facing the Fear	Mike Shields		James Boshier & Logan McPherson	Kaleidoscope TWC, Mainframe Entertainment Inc., The Weinstein Company	Genius Products	75 minutes
Untitled reboot	TBA	TBA	TBA	Project X Entertainment	TBA	

== Reception ==
=== Box office and financial performance ===
Film	Box office gross			Box office ranking (per release year)		Budget	Ref.
Film	North America	Other territories	Worldwide	All time worldwide	North America	Budget	Ref.
The Nutty Professor (1963)	$13,343,056	$5,656,944	$19,000,000	#23	not available	$7,630,000	
The Nutty Professor (1996)	$128,814,019	$145,147,000	$273,961,019	#8	#8	$55,000,000	
Nutty Professor II: The Klumps	$123,309,890	$43,030,000	$166,339,890	#16	#26	$84,000,000	
The Nutty Professor: Facing the Fear	video sales/rentals not available	video sales/rentals not available	video sales/rentals not available	not available	not available	not available	
Untitled reboot	—N/a	—N/a	—N/a	—N/a	—N/a	—N/a	
Totals	$265,466,965	$193,833,944	$459,300,909	x̅ #11.75 (Note: This is an approximate average, based on the all-time standing of each theatrically released film.)	x̅ #8.5 (Note: This is an approximate average, based on the all-time standing of each theatrically released film.)	$146,630,000	

=== Critical and public response ===
Film	Rotten Tomatoes	Metacritic	CinemaScore
The Nutty Professor (1963)	83% (29 reviews)	—N/a	—N/a
The Nutty Professor (1996)	83% (18 top critic reviews)	62/100 (20 reviews)	A−
Nutty Professor II: The Klumps	31% (26 top critic reviews)	38/100 (34 reviews)	A−
The Nutty Professor: Facing the Fear	—N/a	—N/a	—N/a

== Stage ==
A musical comedy adaptation ran on Broadway after a tryout production that opened at the Nashville Tennessee Performing Arts Center from July to August 2012. Lewis directed the musical, with choreography by Joann M. Hunter. The musical has a book and lyrics written by Rupert Holmes and music composed by Marvin Hamlisch, with scenery by David Gallo and costumes by Ann Hould-Ward. Michael Andrew was cast in the lead role as Professor Julius Kelp. The plot closely follows the original film. The production received positive reviews for its choreography, songs, cast, set, and story.

=== Novelization ===
The accompanying novel written by the author of the musical's script, Rupert Holmes, received praise for its use of comedy as well as for the meaningful underlying message.
