= The Nutty Professor =

The Nutty Professor may refer to:

- The Nutty Professor (1963 film), a comedy directed by and starring Jerry Lewis
- The Nutty Professor (1996 film), a comedy starring Eddie Murphy
  - The Nutty Professor (soundtrack), soundtrack album for the 1996 film
- The Nutty Professor (2008 film), animated comedy and sequel to the 1963 film
- The Nutty Professor (character), the titular character in the above media
- The Nutty Professor (franchise), encompassing the above media and their sequels
