= Satellite Award for Best Actor in a Motion Picture =

Annual film award

Satellite Award for Best Actor
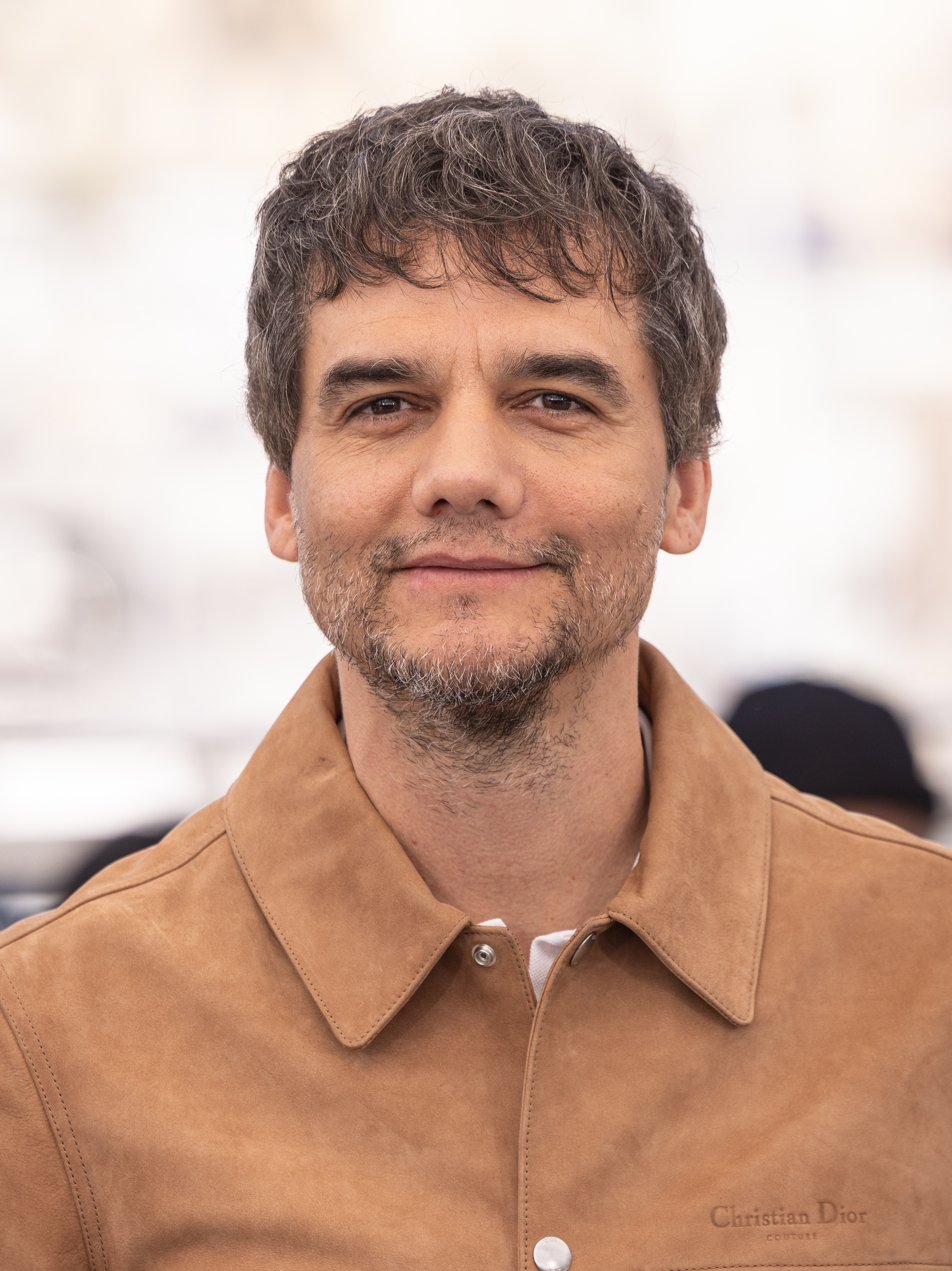
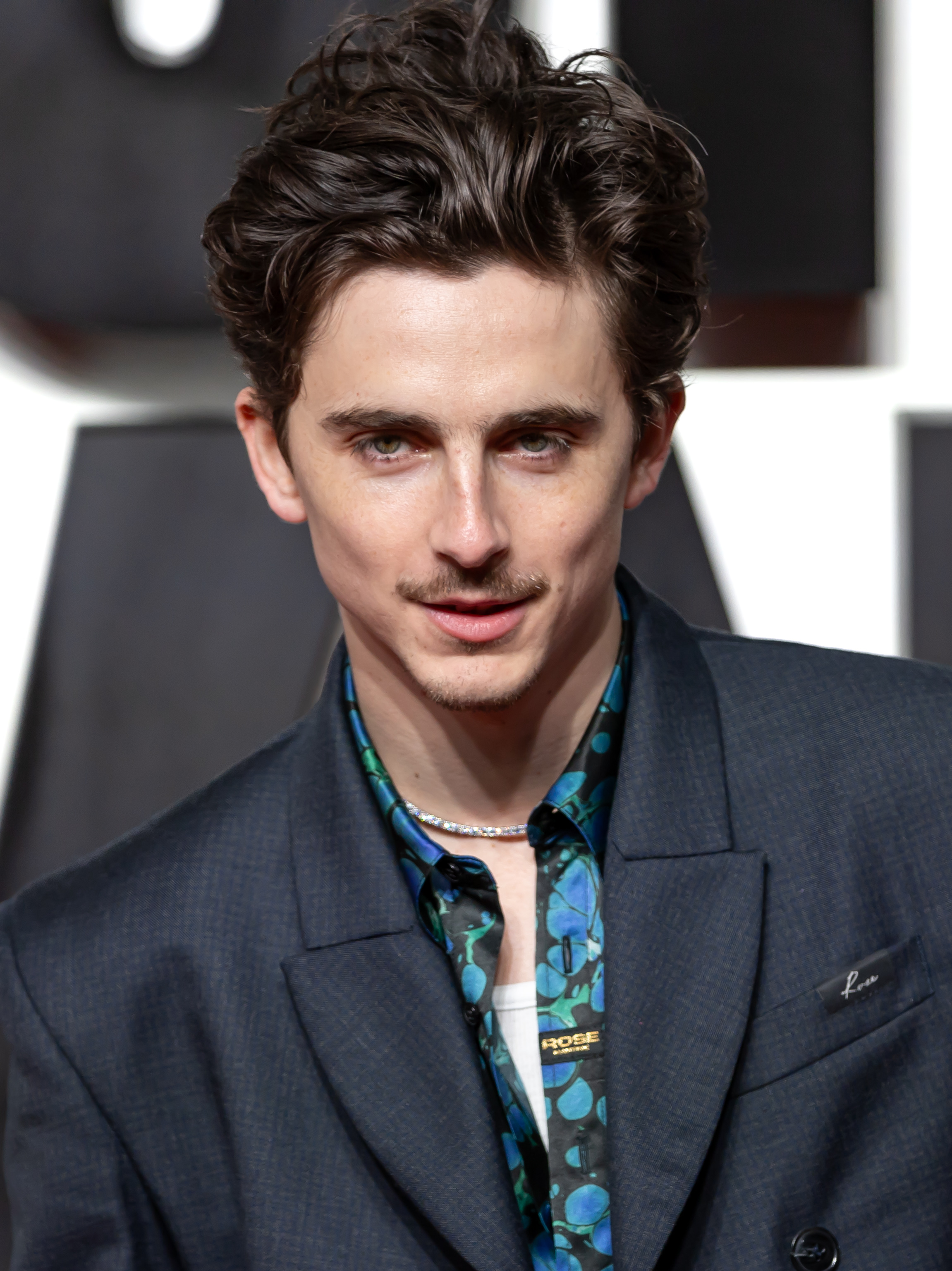
- The 2025 recipients: Wagner Moura & Timothée Chalamet
- Awarded for: Best Actor in a Drama Motion Picture; Best Actor in a Comedy or Musical Motion Picture
- Country: United States
- Presented by: International Press Academy
- First award: 1996
- Currently held by: Drama: Wagner Moura – The Secret Agent (2025); Comedy or Musical: Timothée Chalamet – Marty Supreme (2025)
- Website: http://www.pressacademy.com/

The Satellite Award for Best Actor in a Motion Picture is an annual award given by the International Press Academy as one of its Satellite Awards. The category has gone through several changes since its inception.

- From 1996 to 2010, two categories based on genre were presented, Best Actor – Motion Picture Drama and Best Actor – Motion Picture Comedy or Musical
- In 2011, the IPA pared down its Satellite nominations in the motion picture categories from 22 to 19 classifications; the change reflects the merger of drama and comedy under a general Best Picture heading, including the Best Actor/Actress headings and the Supporting headings.
- In 2016 and 2017, two winners were announced within the Best Actor category, one for the performance by an actor in a major studio film and other for a performance in an independent film.

Since 2018, the two categories based on genre are presented replacing the Best Actor in a Motion Picture category for the Best Actor – Motion Picture Drama and Best Actor – Motion Picture Comedy or Musical categories previously presented.

== Winners and nominees ==
=== Best Actor – Motion Picture Drama (1996–2010, 2018–present) ===
Year	Actor	Film	Role
1996	Geoffrey Rush	Shine	David Helfgott
1996	William H. Macy	Fargo	Jerry Lundegaard
1996	Christopher Eccleston	Jude	Jude Fawley
1996	Ralph Fiennes	The English Patient	László Almásy
1996	Billy Bob Thornton	Sling Blade	Karl Childers
1996	James Woods	Killer: A Journal of Murder	Carl Panzram
1997	Robert Duvall	The Apostle	Euliss "Sonny" Dewey / The Apostle E.F.
1997	Russell Crowe	L.A. Confidential	Officer Wendell "Bud" White
1997	Mark Wahlberg	Boogie Nights	Eddie Adams ("Dirk Diggler")
1997	Djimon Hounsou	Amistad	Sengbe Pieh / Joseph Cinqué
1997	Leonardo DiCaprio	Titanic	Jack Dawson
1997	Matt Damon	Good Will Hunting	Will Hunting
1998	Edward Norton	American History X	Derek Vinyard
1998	Stephen Fry	Wilde	Oscar Wilde
1998	Brendan Gleeson	The General	Martin Cahill
1998	Derek Jacobi	Love Is the Devil: Study for a Portrait of Francis Bacon	Francis Bacon
1998	Ian McKellen	Gods and Monsters	James Whale
1998	Nick Nolte	Affliction	Wade Whitehouse
1999	Terence Stamp	The Limey	Wilson
1999	Kevin Spacey	American Beauty	Lester Burnham
1999	Russell Crowe	The Insider	Dr. Jeffrey Wigand
1999	Richard Farnsworth	The Straight Story	Alvin Straight
1999	Al Pacino	The Insider	Lowell Bergman
1999	Denzel Washington	The Hurricane	Rubin "Hurricane" Carter
2000	Geoffrey Rush	Quills	Marquis de Sade
2000	Jamie Bell	Billy Elliot	Billy Elliot
2000	Sean Connery	Finding Forrester	William Forrester
2000	Russell Crowe	Gladiator	Maximus Decimus Meridius
2000	Ed Harris	Pollock	Jackson Pollock
2000	Denzel Washington	Remember the Titans	Herman Boone
2001	Brian Cox	L.I.E.	Big John Harrigan
2001	Russell Crowe	A Beautiful Mind	John Forbes Nash Jr.
2001	Guy Pearce	Memento	Leonard Shelby
2001	Sean Penn	I Am Sam	Sam Dawson
2001	Billy Bob Thornton	Monster's Ball	Hank Grotowski
2001	Denzel Washington	Training Day	Detective Alonzo Harris
2002	Michael Caine	The Quiet American	Thomas Fowler
2002	Daniel Day-Lewis	Gangs of New York	William "Bill the Butcher" Cutting
2002	Tom Hanks	Road to Perdition	Michael Sullivan
2002	Jack Nicholson	About Schmidt	Warren Schmidt
2002	Edward Norton	25th Hour	Monty Brogan
2002	Robin Williams	One Hour Photo	Seymour Parrish
2003	Sean Penn	21 Grams	Paul Rivers
2003	Sean Penn	Mystic River	Jimmy Markum
2003	Paddy Considine	In America	Johnny Sullivan
2003	Hayden Christensen	Shattered Glass	Stephen Glass
2003	Tom Cruise	The Last Samurai	Cpt. Nathan Algren
2003	Jude Law	Cold Mountain	W. P. Inman
2003	William H. Macy	The Cooler	Bernie Lootz
2004	Don Cheadle	Hotel Rwanda	Paul Rusesabagina
2004	Kevin Bacon	The Woodsman	Walter
2004	Javier Bardem	The Sea Inside (Mar adentro)	Ramón Sampedro
2004	Johnny Depp	Finding Neverland	J. M. Barrie
2004	Gael García Bernal	The Motorcycle Diaries (Diarios de motocicleta)	Ernesto Guevara de la Serna
2004	Liam Neeson	Kinsey	Dr. Alfred Kinsey
2005	Philip Seymour Hoffman	Capote	Truman Capote
2005	Jake Gyllenhaal	Jarhead	LCpl./PFC. Anthony Swofford
2005	Heath Ledger	Brokeback Mountain	Ennis Del Mar
2005	Tommy Lee Jones	The Three Burials of Melquiades Estrada	Pete Perkins
2005	Viggo Mortensen	A History of Violence	Tom Stall / Joey Cusack
2005	David Strathairn	Good Night, and Good Luck	Edward R. Murrow
2006	Forest Whitaker	The Last King of Scotland	Idi Amin
2006	Leonardo DiCaprio	Blood Diamond	Danny Archer
2006	Ryan Gosling	Half Nelson	Dan Dunne
2006	Joshua Jackson	Aurora Borealis	Duncan Shorter
2006	Derek Luke	Catch a Fire	Patrick Chamusso
2006	Patrick Wilson	Little Children	Brad Adamson
2007	Viggo Mortensen	Eastern Promises	Nikolai Luzhin
2007	Josh Brolin	No Country for Old Men	Llewelyn Moss
2007	Christian Bale	Rescue Dawn	Dieter Dengler
2007	Tommy Lee Jones	In the Valley of Elah	Hank Deerfield
2007	Frank Langella	Starting Out in the Evening	Leonard Schiller
2007	Denzel Washington	American Gangster	Frank Lucas
2008	Richard Jenkins	The Visitor	Walter Vale
2008	Frank Langella	Frost/Nixon	Richard Nixon
2008	Leonardo DiCaprio	Revolutionary Road	Frank Wheeler
2008	Sean Penn	Milk	Harvey Milk
2008	Mickey Rourke	The Wrestler	Robin Ramzinski / Randy "The Ram" Robinson
2008	Mark Ruffalo	What Doesn't Kill You	Brian Reilly
2009	Jeremy Renner	The Hurt Locker	SFC. William James
2009	Jeff Bridges	Crazy Heart	Otis "Bad" Blake
2009	Hugh Dancy	Adam	Adam Raki
2009	Johnny Depp	Public Enemies	John Dillinger
2009	Colin Firth	A Single Man	George Falconer
2009	Michael Sheen	The Damned United	Brian Clough
2010	Colin Firth	The King's Speech	King George VI
2010	Javier Bardem	Biutiful	Uxbal
2010	Leonardo DiCaprio	Inception	Dominic "Dom" Cobb
2010	Michael Douglas	Solitary Man	Ben Kalmen
2010	Robert Duvall	Get Low	Felix Bush
2010	Jesse Eisenberg	The Social Network	Mark Zuckerberg
2010	James Franco	127 Hours	Aron Ralston
2010	Ryan Gosling	Blue Valentine	Dean Pereira
2018	Willem Dafoe	At Eternity's Gate	Vincent van Gogh
2018	Ben Foster	Leave No Trace	Will
2018	Ryan Gosling	First Man	Neil Armstrong
2018	Ethan Hawke	First Reformed	Ernst Toller
2018	Lucas Hedges	Boy Erased	Jared Eamons
2018	Robert Redford	The Old Man & the Gun	Forrest Tucker
2019	Christian Bale	Ford v Ferrari	Ken Miles
2019	Adam Driver	Marriage Story	Charlie Barber
2019	Antonio Banderas	Pain and Glory	Salvador Mallo
2019	George MacKay	1917	Lance Corporal William Schofield
2019	Joaquin Phoenix	Joker	Arthur Fleck / Joker
2019	Mark Ruffalo	Dark Waters	Robert Bilott
2020	Riz Ahmed	Sound of Metal	Ruben Stone
2020	Chadwick Boseman (posthumous)	Ma Rainey's Black Bottom	Levee Green
2020	Anthony Hopkins	The Father	Anthony
2020	Delroy Lindo	Da 5 Bloods	Paul
2020	Gary Oldman	Mank	Herman J. Mankiewicz
2020	Steven Yeun	Minari	Jacob Yi
2021	Benedict Cumberbatch	The Power of the Dog	Phil Burbank
2021	Denzel Washington	The Tragedy of Macbeth	Lord Macbeth
2021	Clifton Collins Jr.	Jockey	Jackson Silva
2021	Joaquin Phoenix	C'mon C'mon	Johnny
2021	Tom Skerritt	East of the Mountains	Ben Givens
2021	Will Smith	King Richard	Richard Williams
2022	Brendan Fraser	The Whale	Charlie
2022	Tom Cruise	Top Gun: Maverick	Captain Pete "Maverick" Mitchell
2022	Hugh Jackman	The Son	Peter Miller
2022	Gabriel LaBelle	The Fabelmans	Samuel "Sammy" Fabelman
2022	Bill Nighy	Living	Mr. Williams
2022	Mark Wahlberg	Father Stu	Father Stuart "Stu" Long
2023	Cillian Murphy	Oppenheimer	J. Robert Oppenheimer
2023	Bradley Cooper	Maestro	Leonard Bernstein
2023	Leonardo DiCaprio	Killers of the Flower Moon	Ernest Burkhart
2023	Colman Domingo	Rustin	Bayard Rustin
2023	Franz Rogowski	Passages	Tomas Freiburg
2023	Andrew Scott	All of Us Strangers	Adam
2024	Colman Domingo	Sing Sing	John "Divine G" Whitfield
2024	Adrien Brody	The Brutalist	László Tóth
2024	Timothée Chalamet	A Complete Unknown	Bob Dylan
2024	Daniel Craig	Queer	William Lee
2024	Ralph Fiennes	Conclave	Thomas Cardinal Lawrence
2024	Hugh Grant	Heretic	Mr. Reed
2025	Wagner Moura	The Secret Agent	Marcelo Alves / Armando Solimões / Fernando Solimões
2025	Leonardo DiCaprio	One Battle After Another	Bob Ferguson
2025	Joel Edgerton	Train Dreams	Robert Grainier
2025	Oscar Isaac	Frankenstein	Victor Frankenstein
2025	Michael B. Jordan	Sinners	Elijah "Smoke" Moore / Elias "Stack" Moore

=== Best Actor – Motion Picture Musical or Comedy (1996–2010, 2018–present) ===
Year	Actor	Film	Role
1996	Tom Cruise	Jerry Maguire	Jerry Maguire
1996	Nathan Lane	The Birdcage	Albert Goldman
1996	Eddie Murphy	The Nutty Professor	Sherman Klump / Various Characters
1996	Jack Nicholson	Mars Attacks!	James Dale
1996	Stanley Tucci	Big Night	Secondo
1997	Jack Nicholson	As Good as It Gets	Melvin Udall
1997	Robert Carlyle	The Full Monty	Gary "Gaz" Schofield
1997	Dustin Hoffman	Wag the Dog	Stanley Motss
1997	Tommy Lee Jones	Men in Black	Kevin Brown / Agent K
1997	Kevin Kline	In & Out	Howard Brackett
1997	Howard Stern	Private Parts	Himself
1998	Ian Bannen	Waking Ned	Jackie O'Shea
1998	David Kelly	Waking Ned	Michael O'Sullivan
1998	Warren Beatty	Bulworth	Senator Jay Billington Bulworth
1998	Jeff Bridges	The Big Lebowski	Jeffrey "The Dude" Lebowski
1998	Michael Caine	Little Voice	Ray Say
1998	Robin Williams	Patch Adams	Hunter "Patch" Adams
1999	Philip Seymour Hoffman	Flawless	Rusty
1999	Jim Carrey	Man on the Moon	Andy Kaufman
1999	Johnny Depp	Sleepy Hollow	Ichabod Crane
1999	Rupert Everett	An Ideal Husband	Arthur Goring
1999	Sean Penn	Sweet and Lowdown	Emmet Ray
1999	Steve Zahn	Happy, Texas	Wayne Wayne Wayne Jr. (a.k.a. David)
2000	Michael Douglas	Wonder Boys	Grady Tripp
2000	George Clooney	O Brother, Where Art Thou?	Ulysses Everett McGill
2000	Richard Gere	Dr. T & the Women	Dr. Sullivan Travis (Dr. T)
2000	Christopher Guest	Best in Show	Harlan Pepper
2000	Eddie Murphy	Nutty Professor II: The Klumps	Sherman Klump / Various Characters
2000	Edward Norton	Keeping the Faith	Brian Finn
2001	Ewan McGregor	Moulin Rouge!	Christian
2001	Colin Firth	Bridget Jones's Diary	Mark Darcy
2001	Gene Hackman	The Royal Tenenbaums	Royal Tenenbaum
2001	John Cameron Mitchell	Hedwig and the Angry Inch	Hansel Schmidt / Hedwig Robinson
2001	Ben Stiller	Zoolander	Derek Zoolander
2001	Chris Tucker	Rush Hour 2	James Carter
2002	Kieran Culkin	Igby Goes Down	Jason "Igby" Slocumb Jr.
2002	Nicolas Cage	Adaptation.	Charlie and Donald Kaufman
2002	Hugh Grant	About a Boy	Will Freeman
2002	Sam Rockwell	Confessions of a Dangerous Mind	Chuck Barris
2002	Adam Sandler	Punch-Drunk Love	Barry Egan
2002	Aaron Stanford	Tadpole	Oscar Grubman
2003	Bill Murray	Lost in Translation	Bob Harris
2003	Jack Black	School of Rock	Dewey Finn
2003	Johnny Depp	Pirates of the Caribbean: The Curse of the Black Pearl	Capt. Jack Sparrow
2003	Robert Downey Jr.	The Singing Detective	Dan Dark
2003	Paul Giamatti	American Splendor	Harvey Pekar
2003	Billy Bob Thornton	Bad Santa	Willie T. Stokes
2004	Jamie Foxx	Ray	Ray Charles
2004	Gerard Butler	The Phantom of the Opera	The Phantom
2004	Jim Carrey	Eternal Sunshine of the Spotless Mind	Joel Barish
2004	Paul Giamatti	Sideways	Miles Raymond
2004	Kevin Kline	De-Lovely	Cole Porter
2004	Bill Murray	The Life Aquatic with Steve Zissou	Steve Zissou
2005	Terrence Howard	Hustle & Flow	DJay
2005	Kevin Costner	The Upside of Anger	Denny Davies
2005	Robert Downey Jr.	Kiss Kiss Bang Bang	Harry Lockhart
2005	Cillian Murphy	Breakfast on Pluto	Patrick "Kitten" Braden
2005	Bill Murray	Broken Flowers	Don Johnston
2005	Joaquin Phoenix	Walk the Line	Johnny Cash
2006	Joseph Cross	Running with Scissors	Augusten Burroughs
2006	Sacha Baron Cohen	Borat: Cultural Learnings of America for Make Benefit Glorious Nation of Kazakhstan	Borat Sagdiyev
2006	Aaron Eckhart	Thank You for Smoking	Nick Naylor
2006	Will Ferrell	Stranger than Fiction	Harold Crick
2006	Peter O'Toole	Venus	Maurice Russell
2007	Ryan Gosling	Lars and the Real Girl	Lars Lindstrom
2007	Don Cheadle	Talk to Me	Ralph Greene Jr.
2007	Richard Gere	The Hoax	Clifford Irving
2007	Ben Kingsley	You Kill Me	Frank Falenczyk
2007	Clive Owen	Shoot 'Em Up	Mr. Smith
2007	Seth Rogen	Knocked Up	Ben Stone
2008	Ricky Gervais	Ghost Town	Bertram Pincus
2008	Josh Brolin	W.	George W. Bush
2008	Michael Cera	Nick and Norah's Infinite Playlist	Nick O'Leary
2008	Brendan Gleeson	In Bruges	Ken Daley
2008	Sam Rockwell	Choke	Victor Mancini
2008	Mark Ruffalo	The Brothers Bloom	Stephen
2009	Michael Stuhlbarg	A Serious Man	Larry Gopnik
2009	George Clooney	Up in the Air	Ryan Bingham
2009	Bradley Cooper	The Hangover	Phil Wenneck
2009	Matt Damon	The Informant!	Mark Whitacre
2009	Daniel Day-Lewis	Nine	Guido Contini
2010	Michael Cera	Scott Pilgrim vs. the World	Scott Pilgrim
2010	Steve Carell	Dinner for Schmucks	Barry Speck
2010	Romain Duris	Heartbreaker	Alex Lippi
2010	Andy García	City Island	Vince Rizzo
2010	Jake Gyllenhaal	Love & Other Drugs	Jamie Randall
2010	John Malkovich	Red	Marvin Boggs
2010	John C. Reilly	Cyrus	John Kilpatrick
2018	Rami Malek	Bohemian Rhapsody	Freddie Mercury
2018	Bradley Cooper	A Star Is Born	Jackson Maine
2018	Lin-Manuel Miranda	Mary Poppins Returns	Jack
2018	Viggo Mortensen	Green Book	Frank "Tony Lip" Vallelonga
2018	Nick Robinson	Love, Simon	Simon Spier
2018	John David Washington	BlacKkKlansman	Detective Ron Stallworth
2019	Taron Egerton	Rocketman	Elton John
2019	Daniel Craig	Knives Out	Detective Benoit Blanc
2019	Leonardo DiCaprio	Once Upon a Time in Hollywood	Rick Dalton
2019	Eddie Murphy	Dolemite Is My Name	Rudy Ray Moore
2019	Adam Sandler	Uncut Gems	Howard Ratner
2019	Taika Waititi	Jojo Rabbit	Adolf Hitler
2020	Sacha Baron Cohen	Borat Subsequent Moviefilm	Borat Sagdiyev
2020	Lin-Manuel Miranda	Hamilton	Alexander Hamilton
2020	Leslie Odom Jr.	Hamilton	Aaron Burr
2020	Dev Patel	The Personal History of David Copperfield	David Copperfield
2020	Andy Samberg	Palm Springs	Nyles
2021	Andrew Garfield	tick, tick... BOOM!	Jonathan Larson
2021	Peter Dinklage	Cyrano	Cyrano de Bergerac
2021	Anthony Ramos	In the Heights	Usnavi de la Vega
2022	Austin Butler	Elvis	Elvis Presley
2022	Diego Calva	Babylon	Manny Torres
2022	Daniel Craig	Glass Onion: A Knives Out Mystery	Detective Benoit Blanc
2022	Colin Farrell	The Banshees of Inisherin	Pádraic Súilleabháin
2022	Ralph Fiennes	The Menu	Julian Slowik
2022	Adam Sandler	Hustle	Stanley Sugerman
2023	Paul Giamatti	The Holdovers	Paul Hunham
2023	Nicolas Cage	Dream Scenario	Paul Matthews
2023	Barry Keoghan	Saltburn	Oliver Quick
2023	Joaquin Phoenix	Beau Is Afraid	Beau Wassermann
2023	Jeffrey Wright	American Fiction	Thelonious "Monk" Ellison
2024	Keith Kupferer	Ghostlight	Dan Mueller
2024	Jesse Eisenberg	A Real Pain	David Kaplan
2024	Ryan Gosling	The Fall Guy	Colt Seavers
2024	Michael Keaton	Beetlejuice Beetlejuice	Betelgeuse
2024	John Magaro	LaRoy, Texas	Ray
2025	Timothée Chalamet	Marty Supreme	Marty Mauser
2025	George Clooney	Jay Kelly	Jay Kelly
2025	Ethan Hawke	Blue Moon	Lorenz Hart
2025	Liam Neeson	The Naked Gun	Lt. Frank Drebin Jr.
2025	Jesse Plemons	Bugonia	Teddy Gatz

=== Best Actor – Motion Picture (2011–2017) ===
Year	Actor	Film	Role
2011	Ryan Gosling	Drive	The Driver
2011	George Clooney	The Descendants	Matthew "Matt" King
2011	Leonardo DiCaprio	J. Edgar	J. Edgar Hoover
2011	Michael Fassbender	Shame	Brandon Sullivan
2011	Brendan Gleeson	The Guard	Sergeant Gerry Boyle
2011	Tom Hardy	Warrior	Tommy Riordan Conlon
2011	Woody Harrelson	Rampart	Officer David "Dave" Brown
2011	Gary Oldman	Tinker Tailor Soldier Spy	George Smiley
2011	Brad Pitt	Moneyball	Billy Beane
2011	Michael Shannon	Take Shelter	Curtis LaForche
2012	Bradley Cooper	Silver Linings Playbook	Patrizio "Pat" Solitano Jr.
2012	Daniel Day-Lewis	Lincoln	Abraham Lincoln
2012	John Hawkes	The Sessions	Mark O'Brien
2012	Hugh Jackman	Les Misérables	Jean Valjean
2012	Joaquin Phoenix	The Master	Freddie Quell
2012	Omar Sy	The Intouchables	Bakary "Driss" Bassri
2012	Denzel Washington	Flight	Captain William "Whip" Whitaker Sr.
2013	Matthew McConaughey	Dallas Buyers Club	Ron Woodroof
2013	Christian Bale	American Hustle	Irving Rosenfeld
2013	Bruce Dern	Nebraska	Woodrow "Woody" Grant
2013	Leonardo DiCaprio	The Wolf of Wall Street	Jordan Belfort
2013	Chiwetel Ejiofor	12 Years a Slave	Solomon Northup
2013	Tom Hanks	Captain Phillips	Captain Richard Phillips
2013	Robert Redford	All Is Lost	Our Man
2013	Forest Whitaker	The Butler	Cecil Gaines
2014	Michael Keaton	Birdman or (The Unexpected Virtue of Ignorance)	Riggan Thomson / Birdman
2014	Steve Carell	Foxcatcher	John Eleuthère du Pont
2014	Benedict Cumberbatch	The Imitation Game	Alan Turing
2014	Jake Gyllenhaal	Nightcrawler	Louis "Lou" Bloom
2014	David Oyelowo	Selma	Martin Luther King Jr.
2014	Eddie Redmayne	The Theory of Everything	Stephen Hawking
2014	Miles Teller	Whiplash	Andrew Neiman
2015	Leonardo DiCaprio	The Revenant	Hugh Glass
2015	Matt Damon	The Martian	Mark Watney
2015	Johnny Depp	Black Mass	James "Whitey" Bulger
2015	Michael Fassbender	Steve Jobs	Steve Jobs
2015	Tom Hardy	Legend	Ronald "Ronnie" and Reginald "Reggie" Kray
2015	Eddie Redmayne	The Danish Girl	Lili Elbe / Einar Wegener
2015	Will Smith	Concussion	Dr. Bennet Omalu
2016	Andrew Garfield	Hacksaw Ridge	Desmond T. Doss
2016	Viggo Mortensen	Captain Fantastic	Ben Cash
2016	Casey Affleck	Manchester by the Sea	Lee Chandler
2016	Joel Edgerton	Loving	Richard Loving
2016	Joseph Gordon-Levitt	Snowden	Edward Snowden
2016	Ryan Gosling	La La Land	Sebastian Wilder
2016	Tom Hanks	Sully	Captain Chesley "Sully" Sullenberger
2016	Denzel Washington	Fences	Troy Maxson
2017	Gary Oldman	Darkest Hour	Winston Churchill
2017	Harry Dean Stanton	Lucky	Lucky
2017	Daniel Day-Lewis	Phantom Thread	Reynolds Woodcock
2017	James Franco	The Disaster Artist	Tommy Wiseau
2017	Jake Gyllenhaal	Stronger	Jeff Bauman
2017	Robert Pattinson	Good Time	Constantine "Connie" Nikas
2017	Jeremy Renner	Wind River	Cory Lambert

== Multiple nominations ==
9 nominations

- Leonardo DiCaprio

7 nominations

- Denzel Washington

6 nominations

- Ryan Gosling

5 nominations

- Johnny Depp
- Joaquin Phoenix

4 nominations

- Bradley Cooper
- Russell Crowe
- Daniel Day-Lewis
- Jake Gyllenhaal
- Viggo Mortensen
- Sean Penn

3 nominations

- Christian Bale
- Steve Carell
- George Clooney
- Matt Damon
- Colin Firth
- Paul Giamatti
- Brendan Gleeson
- Tom Hanks
- Tommy Lee Jones
- Eddie Murphy
- Bill Murray
- Jack Nicholson
- Edward Norton
- Gary Oldman
- Mark Ruffalo
- Billy Bob Thornton

2 nominations

- Javier Bardem
- Jeff Bridges
- Josh Brolin
- Nicolas Cage
- Michael Caine
- Jim Carrey
- Michael Cera
- Don Cheadle
- Sacha Baron Cohen
- Tom Cruise
- Benedict Cumberbatch
- Michael Douglas
- Robert Downey Jr.
- Robert Duvall
- Michael Fassbender
- James Franco
- Andrew Garfield
- Richard Gere
- Tom Hardy
- Philip Seymour Hoffman
- Kevin Kline
- Frank Langella
- William H. Macy
- Lin-Manuel Miranda
- Cillian Murphy
- Robert Redford
- Eddie Redmayne
- Jeremy Renner
- Sam Rockwell
- Geoffrey Rush
- Adam Sandler
- Will Smith
- Forest Whitaker
- Robin Williams

== Multiple wins ==
2 wins

- Andrew Garfield
- Ryan Gosling
- Philip Seymour Hoffman
- Viggo Mortensen
- Geoffrey Rush

== See also ==
- Academy Award for Best Actor
- Golden Globe Award for Best Actor – Motion Picture Musical or Comedy
- Golden Globe Award for Best Actor – Motion Picture Drama
- Critics' Choice Movie Award for Best Actor
