= Kerr House =

Kerr House may refer to:

in the United States (by state then city)

- Kerr-Booth House, Searcy, Arkansas, listed on the NRHP in White County, Arkansas
- Kerr House (Denver, Colorado), listed on the National Register of Historic Places in Southeast Denver, Colorado
- Andrew Kerr House, Newark, Delaware, NRHP-listed
- William Kerr House, Union City, Randolph County, Indiana, NRHP-listed
- Thomas Shelby House, near Lexington, Missouri, also known as Kerr House, NRHP-listed
- Kerr House (Kalispell, Montana), listed on the National Register of Historic Places in Flathead County, Montana
- Gen. William Kerr House, Enochville, Rowan County, North Carolina, NRHP-listed
- James Kerr House, Kerr, Sampson County, North Carolina, NRHP-listed
- Kerr-Patton House, Thompson, Alamance County, North Carolina, NRHP-listed
- Benjamin F. Kerr House, Grand Rapids, Ohio, listed on the NRHP in Wood County, Ohio
- Whidden–Kerr House and Garden, near Portland, Oregon, NRHP-listed
- Dr. Thomas R. Kerr House and Office, Oakmont, Pennsylvania, NRHP-listed
- Macklin Kerr House, Maryville, Tennessee, listed on the NRHP in Blount County, Tennessee
- Ploeger-Kerr-White House, Bastrop, Texas, listed on the NRHP in Bastrop County, Texas
- Beverly and Lula Kerr House, Bastrop, Texas, listed on the NRHP in Bastrop County, Texas
- Ker Place, Onancock, Virginia, NRHP-listed
