= Corriher =

Corriher may refer to:

- Corriher Grange Hall, a building near Enochville, Rowan County, North Carolina, US
- Shirley Corriher (born 1935), American biochemist and author
