= The Adventures of Maisie =

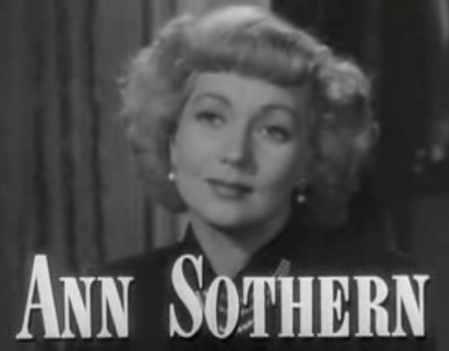
- Ann Sothern
- Other names: Maisie
- Genre: Situation comedy
- Running time: 30 minutes
- Country of origin: United States
- Language: English
- Syndicates: CBS (1945-1947); Syndicated by MGM (1949-1953); Mutual (1952)
- Starring: Ann Sothern; Hy Averback; Hans Conried; Arthur Q. Bryan; Pat McGeehan; Bea Benaderet; Elvia Allman; Sandra Gould; Lurene Tuttle; Johnny McGovern
- Announcer: Jack McCoy (1949-1953)
- Written by: Samuel Taylor (1945-1947)
- Directed by: Tony Sanford (1945-1947); Arthur Phillips (1949-1953)
- Original release: July 5, 1945 – 1953

The Adventures of Maisie (aka Maisie) was a radio comedy series starring Ann Sothern as underemployed entertainer Maisie Ravier. It was a spin-off of Sothern's successful 1939–1947 Maisie movie series, based on Maisie Ravier created by Wilson Collison in his novel Dark Dame.

The series was broadcast on CBS Radio, NBC Radio, the Mutual Radio Network, and Mutual flagship radio station WHN in New York City.

Sponsored by Eversharp, the first series ran on CBS Radio from July 5, 1945 to March 28, 1947, airing on Thursdays at 8:30 p.m. during the first two months, then moving to Wednesdays at 9:30 p.m. (1945–46), then Fridays at 10:30 p.m. (1946–47). The supporting cast included Hy Averback, Arthur Q. Bryan, Hans Conried, Virginia Gregg, Peter Leeds, Johnny McGovern, and Sidney Miller. John "Bud" Hiestand was one of its many announcers, Harry Zimmerman and Albert Sack supplied the music, and John L. Greene produced. Tony Sanford directed scripts by Samuel Taylor and others.

Prouduced by MGM Radio Attractions, the series was heard on the Mutual Radio Network from January 11 to December 26, 1952, and it was syndicated from 1949 to 1953 with Pat McGeehan as Eddie Jordan. Bea Benaderet and Elvia Allman portrayed Mrs. Kennedy. The supporting cast included Averback, Conreid, Leeds, McGovern, Lurene Tuttle, Ben Wright, Sandra Gould, and Jeffrey Silver. Harry Zimmerman led the orchestra with John Easton and Jack McCoy announcing.

Maisie's catchphrase was "Likewise, I'm sure."

== Listen to ==
- 60 of the radio broadcasts The Internet Archive
- Adventures of Maisie on Way Back When
- Adventures of Maisie on Old Time Radio Outlaws
