= Enochville, North Carolina =

- CDP
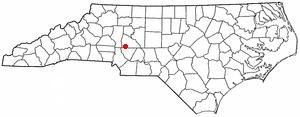
- Location of Enochville, North Carolina
- Coordinates: 35°31′14″N 80°39′52″W
- Country: United States
- State: North Carolina
- County: Rowan

Area
  - Total: 4.71 sq mi (12.20 km^{2})
  - Land: 4.48 sq mi (11.60 km^{2})
  - Water: 0.23 sq mi (0.60 km^{2})
- Elevation: 824 ft (251 m)

Population (2020)
  - Total: 2,893
  - Density: 646.1/sq mi (249.47/km^{2})
- Time zone: UTC-5 (Eastern (EST))
  - Summer (DST): UTC-4 (EDT)
- FIPS code: 37-21500
- GNIS feature ID: 2402456

Enochville is a census-designated place (CDP) in Rowan County, North Carolina, United States. As of the 2020 census, Enochville had a population of 2,893.

== History ==
The census-designated place had previously been an incorporated town, one of the oldest in Rowan County. It was originally chartered in 1877 but lost its incorporation in 1974. People assumed the town was not incorporated, but the charter was still active. After the Rowan County Board of Elections ordered election of town officials in 1973, the people asked to decide whether to remain incorporated, and they voted 84-41 against.

A movement to re-incorporate Enochville started in 2003, but it has been opposed by the nearby city of Kannapolis. A bill to incorporate the town was introduced in the state legislature in 2009, but it failed to make it out of committee.

Near Enochville is the Corriher Grange Hall, listed on the National Register of Historic Places (NRHP). The Gen. William Kerr House is another local property listed on the NRHP. Enochville is the birthplace of veteran 20th century radio and television actress Elvia Allman.

== Geography ==
According to the United States Census Bureau, the CDP has a total area of 4.7 square miles (12 km^{2}), of which 4.4 square miles (11 km^{2}) is land and 0.2 square miles (0.52 km^{2}) (5.16%) is water.

== Demographics ==
Historical population
Census	Pop.	Note	%±
2020	2,893		—
U.S. Decennial Census

=== 2020 census ===
As of the 2020 census, Enochville had a population of 2,893. The median age was 44.0 years. 20.4% of residents were under the age of 18 and 20.7% of residents were 65 years of age or older. For every 100 females there were 97.2 males, and for every 100 females age 18 and over there were 96.0 males age 18 and over.

95.1% of residents lived in urban areas, while 4.9% lived in rural areas.

There were 1,146 households in Enochville, of which 29.1% had children under the age of 18 living in them. Of all households, 52.0% were married-couple households, 17.7% were households with a male householder and no spouse or partner present, and 23.2% were households with a female householder and no spouse or partner present. About 25.6% of all households were made up of individuals, and 12.6% had someone living alone who was 65 years of age or older.

There were 1,258 housing units, of which 8.9% were vacant. The homeowner vacancy rate was 1.2% and the rental vacancy rate was 5.8%.

Enochville racial composition
Race	Number	Percentage
White (non-Hispanic)	2,407	83.2%
Black or African American (non-Hispanic)	69	2.39%
Native American	7	0.24%
Asian	31	1.07%
Other/Mixed	87	3.01%
Hispanic or Latino	292	10.09%

=== 2000 census ===
As of the census of 2000, there were 2,851 people, 1,143 households, and 846 families residing in the CDP. The population density was 645.5 inhabitants per square mile (249.2/km^{2}). There were 1,219 housing units at an average density of 276.0 per square mile (106.6/km^{2}). The racial makeup of the CDP was 95.97% White, 2.03% African American, 0.46% Native American, 0.60% Asian, 0.07% Pacific Islander, 0.42% from other races, and 0.46% from two or more races. Hispanic or Latino of any race were 2.14% of the population.

There were 1,143 households, out of which 28.1% had children under the age of 18 living with them, 61.2% were married couples living together, 9.5% had a female householder with no husband present, and 25.9% were non-families. 22.8% of all households were made up of individuals, and 11.0% had someone living alone who was 65 years of age or older. The average household size was 2.47 and the average family size was 2.88.

In the CDP, the population was spread out, with 22.4% under the age of 18, 6.2% from 18 to 24, 28.7% from 25 to 44, 26.2% from 45 to 64, and 16.5% who were 65 years of age or older. The median age was 40 years. For every 100 females, there were 88.7 males. For every 100 females age 18 and over, there were 90.4 males.

The median income for a household in the CDP was $38,438, and the median income for a family was $46,603. Males had a median income of $34,115 versus $20,819 for females. The per capita income for the CDP was $16,558. About 7.2% of families and 8.2% of the population were below the poverty line, including 12.3% of those under age 18 and 19.9% of those age 65 or over.

== Education ==
Students in the area are served primarily by the Rowan–Salisbury School System. The former Enochville Elementary School, which was closed in June 2021, is located in the area and most students attend South Rowan High School in nearby Landis.
