= The Doorman (Seinfeld) =

- Seinfeld episode
- Episode no.: Season 6 Episode 18
- Directed by: Andy Ackerman
- Written by: Tom Gammill & Max Pross
- Production code: 616
- Original air date: February 23, 1995

Guest appearances
- Jerry Stiller as Frank Costanza; Estelle Harris as Estelle Costanza; Ian Abercrombie as Mr. Pitt; Patrick Cronin as Farkus; Larry Miller as Sal (Doorman); Reni Santoni as Poppie; Edith Fields as Mrs. Payton; Nick Jameson as Horst; Jack Betts as Mr. Green; Barbara Pilavin as German Woman; Toni Sawyer as Tenant #1; Nigel Gibbs as Tenant #2; Deck McKenzie as Delivery Man; Trudi Forristal as Buxom Woman

Episode chronology
← Previous "The Kiss Hello"	Next → "The Jimmy"
- Seinfeld season 6

"The Doorman" is the 104th episode of the NBC sitcom Seinfeld. This is the 18th episode for the sixth season. It aired on February 23, 1995. In this episode, Jerry makes an enemy of a doorman while meeting up with Elaine, Kramer invents a support garment for Frank Costanza's male breasts, and George entreats his mother to take his father off his hands.

== Plot ==
Elaine is on house sitting duty while Mr. Pitt is away. Jerry arrives to pick up Elaine to see a movie, and has an awkward conversation with the doorman. Jerry will not leave until the doorman changes shifts. Mr. Pitt calls, ordering Elaine to stay and read his mail. Walking home, Jerry meets the doorman standing outside his own apartment building. The doorman accuses him of following him and harassing him.

Kramer, with the thought that it would entertain German tourists on a tour bus, simulates robbing George.

The Costanzas' separation has left Frank Costanza living with George. Frank changes in front of George, revealing that he has large breasts. George fears this could be hereditary, and Kramer is inspired to invent a male undergarment for breast support. George convinces his mother Estelle to take back Frank and inquires about his grandmother's bosom. Estelle walks in on Frank playing a cha-cha record while Kramer fits his undergarment prototype on him.

Jerry encounters the doorman again at Mr. Pitt's building, this time on the night shift. Jerry makes peace, so the doorman leaves Jerry in charge while he goes out to buy a beer. Jerry adjusts to the job, even signing for a package, but as the doorman is taking too long, Jerry leaves his post and heads to Mr. Pitt's apartment. In his absence, a couch in the lobby is stolen. He and Elaine deny that he even spoke to the doorman, but the doorman has the package with Jerry's signature as evidence, so Jerry and Elaine must replace the couch. George gives them back Jerry's pee-stained couch, deliberately leaving himself with no spare bed, as an excuse to evict his father.

Kramer and Frank present their male bra to bra salesman Sid Farkus; Kramer calls his invention "the Bro", although Frank prefers "the Mansiere". They make a deal, but Frank pulls out in a huff when Farkus asks his blessing to date Estelle. When Estelle goes on a date with Farkus, he refuses to move back in with her, regardless of having no place to sleep at George's. George is forced to sleep with Frank in one bed.

The tourists spot Kramer again, and pile out of their bus to apprehend him. Kramer staves off their anger by introducing "the Bro" to them.

Jerry and Elaine deliver the couch, with stain hidden, to the lobby. Poppie, passing through, sees Elaine and relives their clash over abortion, aggravating his gastrointestinal problems again. He urgently sits down and stains the couch anew.

== Production ==
The "Bro" versus "Mansiere" argument was based on a real argument during the episode's production. Writers Tom Gammill and Max Pross used "the Bro" in the script for the episode, but Seinfeld co-creator Larry David contended that "the Mansiere" would be funnier. Kramer's performance for the German tourists was also based on real life; Gammill and Pross would act out New York stereotypes for the benefit of sightseeing buses, including pretending to mug each other.

The doorman was played by Larry Miller, who was Jerry Seinfeld's best friend and one of two finalists for the part of George Costanza. Pross had worked as a doorman one summer, and once saw a doorman he worked with standing outside his own apartment building, which he thought "was insane", inspiring Jerry's street encounter with the doorman. The dim lighting and dialogue style in the scene where Jerry and Elaine discuss how to escape blame for the stolen couch were designed to evoke the film noir genre.

The scene where Kramer is pursued by the German tourists was added by Larry David, and is a parody of a scene from Marathon Man where Laurence Olivier's Nazi character is pursued by Holocaust survivors. The scene with George in bed with his father required numerous takes because actor Jason Alexander kept on cracking up with laughter every time Jerry Stiller offered him the kasha.
