= Nutty Professor II: The Klumps =

2000 science fiction dark comedy film by Peter Segal

- Theatrical release poster
- Directed by: Peter Segal
- Screenplay by: Barry W. Blaustein; David Sheffield; Paul Weitz; Chris Weitz
- Story by: Steve Oedekerk; Barry W. Blaustein; David Sheffield
- Based on: The Nutty Professor by Jerry Lewis; Bill Richmond
- Produced by: Brian Grazer
- Starring: Eddie Murphy; Janet Jackson; Larry Miller; John Ales
- Cinematography: Dean Semler
- Edited by: William Kerr
- Music by: David Newman
- Production company: Imagine Entertainment
- Distributed by: Universal Pictures
- Release date: July 28, 2000
- Running time: 106 minutes
- Country: United States
- Language: English
- Budget: $84 million
- Box office: $166.3 million

Nutty Professor II: The Klumps is a 2000 American science fiction comedy film directed by Peter Segal and starring Eddie Murphy and Janet Jackson. It is the sequel to the 1996 film The Nutty Professor.

In contrast to the previous film, subplots centered on the parents of protagonist Sherman Klump occupy a substantial part of the film. Nutty Professor II: The Klumps was released by Universal Pictures on July 28, 2000. Unlike its predecessor, the film received generally negative reviews and grossed $166.3 million.

== Plot ==
Four years after the events of the first film, Professor Sherman Klump has created a de-aging formula. He is in a relationship with DNA researcher Denise Gaines, developer of a method to isolate genetic material. Despite his good fortune, Sherman's id alter ego, Buddy Love, has taken to sporadically controlling Sherman's body. Sherman becomes determined to permanently rid himself of Buddy when his antics ruin a dinner in honor of his father Cletus' retirement; and a marriage proposal to Denise.

Despite his assistant, Jason, warning him of the harmful consequences, Sherman uses Denise's methodology to isolate and remove the DNA where Buddy has manifested. However, the Buddy genetic material grows into a sentient being when a hair from Jason's Basset Hound, Buster, accidentally lands in it. Sherman apologizes to Denise and they become engaged. Later, Dean Richmond informs them that Phleer Pharmaceuticals has offered Wellman College $150 million for the youth formula.

Sherman and Denise then encounter the physically reformed Buddy at a movie theater, Buddy asks Sherman where his previous girlfriend Carla Purty is, but Sherman tells Buddy that he and Carla weren't in a romantic relationship, but rather close friends. Buddy pickpockets Sherman and learns of the $150 million offer. He subsequently visits the pharmaceutical company, making a rival bid of $149 million with Leanne Guilford, President of Acquisitions, for the youth formula. Sherman learns that the extraction has altered his body chemistry and that he is losing his intelligence. Realizing he needs to keep the youth formula out of Buddy's hands, Sherman stores it at his parents' home.

Sexually frustrated due to his age and impotence, Cletus accidentally drinks some of the youth formula. He goes to a nightclub and attempts to seduce his wife and Sherman's mother, Anna, but she is disgusted. Buddy witnesses Cletus changing and realizes that the youth formula is being stored in the Klump household. Meanwhile, Sherman's condition causes him to humiliate himself in front of Denise's parents, concerning her.

While Sherman's grandmother, Ida Mae Jensen and Anna are organizing a bachelorette party for Denise, Buddy steals some of the youth formula from the Klump household, filling the vial the rest of the way with fertilizer. This sabotage causes chaos at a demonstration the next day as Petey, the male hamster Sherman uses to demonstrate the formula, mutates into a giant monster who rapes Richmond as he is trying to escape under a fur coat, as Petey confuses him for Molly, the female hamster that escaped during the event. The traumatized and furious Richmond fires Sherman, who soon learns from Jason that his brain's deterioration has worsened, so he decides to break up with Denise. Cletus reconciles with Anna and consoles a depressed Sherman, and inadvertently gives him the solution to regaining his intelligence: getting Buddy Love back into his DNA.

Sherman quickly works on a new, more potent formula while his mental faculties allow him. Richmond confronts him about Buddy's actions, believing that they are working together. Sherman leaves with Richmond and a tennis ball covered in the youth formula and heads to a presentation at Phleer Pharmaceuticals that Buddy is giving about the youth formula. Meanwhile, a worried Denise discovers what has happened and that Sherman's brain damage is progressing. With Cletus' help, Denise goes after him. Sherman takes advantage of the canine DNA crossed with Buddy's and throws the tennis ball to distract him. Buddy catches the ball in his mouth, and the youth formula transforms him back into a toddler, then further into a glowing mass of sentient genetic material.

Sherman chases the genetic material, intent on drinking it to correct his condition. However, the material evaporates on the edge of a fountain before he can get to it. Cletus and Denise arrive too late to save him, and Denise breaks into tears, which hit the genetic material and fall into the fountain. As they go to leave, Sherman looks into the fountain, remarking that it is "pretty". Seeing the water is glowing, Denise realizes the genetic material has reconstituted thanks to her tears and that if Sherman drinks the fountain water before it dissipates, he will be restored to normal. Sherman drinks the water and is able to restore his genetic makeup to its proper order, restoring his intelligence.

With Buddy Love defeated, Sherman and Denise finally get married. During the wedding reception, Sherman's older brother, Ernie Klump Sr., sings a song in honor of the couple, while Richmond continues to be hexed by the now normal-sized hamster.

== Cast ==
- Eddie Murphy as:
  - Sherman Klump, a morbidly obese and kind-hearted professor and Denise's husband
  - Buddy Love, Sherman's thin alter-ego
  - Granny Klump, Sherman's maternal grandmother
  - Mama Klump, Sherman's mother
  - Papa Klump (and younger version), Sherman's father
  - Ernie Klump, Sherman's older brother
  - Lance Perkins, a parody of Richard Simmons.
- Janet Jackson as Denise, Sherman's wife
- Larry Miller as Dean Richmond
- John Ales as Jason
- Richard Gant as Denise's father
- Anna Maria Horsford as Denise's mother
- Melinda McGraw as Leanne Guilford
- Jamal Mixon as Ernie Klump Jr.
- Gabriel Williams as Isaac
- Chris Elliott as a restaurant manager
- Earl Boen as Dr. Knoll
- Nikki Cox as bright student
- Freda Payne as Claudine
- Sylvester Jenkins as Old Willie
- Wanda Sykes as Chantal
- Charles Napier as Four Star General

Additionally, Kathleen Freeman makes an uncredited appearance as Denise's neighbor who witnesses Sherman proposing to her. Freeman previously portrayed Millie Lemmon in the original 1963 film.

== Release ==
=== Home media ===
Nutty Professor II: The Klumps was released on DVD and VHS on December 5, 2000. On May 22, 2001, an Uncensored Director's Cut version debuted on DVD.

== Reception ==
=== Box office ===
Nutty Professor II: The Klumps grossed $42.5 million in its opening weekend, beating out What Lies Beneath and Thomas and the Magic Railroad to reach the number one spot. At the time, it had the third-highest opening weekend for a 2000 film, behind Mission: Impossible 2 and X-Men. This also made it the biggest opening weekend for an Imagine Entertainment film, beating Ransom. The film would hold this record four months until How the Grinch Stole Christmas replaced it that November. It set a career record for Eddie Murphy, breaking the three-day record formerly held by Dr. Dolittle. The film managed to secure the fourth-highest July opening weekend, after X-Men, Men in Black and Independence Day. For its second weekend, it fell into second place behind Hollow Man with $18 million.

In the United Kingdom, Nutty Professor II: The Klumps made $2.3 million in its opening weekend, ranking number one ahead of Hollow Man and Billy Elliot. It dropped into fourth place behind Dinosaur, Road Trip and Billy Elliot during its second weekend with $1.3 million. The film went on to generate a total gross of over $123.3 million in the United States and an additional $43 million in other territories, for a worldwide total of $166.3 million worldwide.

=== Critical response ===
On Rotten Tomatoes, Nutty Professor II: The Klumps has an approval rating of 27% and an average rating of 4.5/10, based on reviews from 89 critics. The site's consensus states that "While Eddie Murphy is still hilarious as the entire Klump family, the movie falls apart because of uneven pacing, a poor script, and skits that rely on being gross rather than funny." On Metacritic, the film has a score of 38 out of 100, a score that indicates generally unfavorable reviews, based on reviews from 34 critics. Audiences surveyed by CinemaScore gave the film an average grade of "A−" on a scale of A+ to F.

Salon.com's reviewer gave the movie one of its few positive notices, and offered the praise "cheerfully vulgar." The New Yorker's Anthony Lane was particularly severe; in addition to hating the film, he dismissed Murphy's playing of multiple characters as "minstrelling," and charged the actor with "at once feeding us what we like and despising us for swallowing it."

Wesley Morris of San Francisco Examiner stated that "it's a half-life better than Martin Lawrence treading similar, simpler water in Big Momma's House." Roger Ebert gave the film three stars, noting that while it was "raucous" and "scatological," the film overall proved to be "very funny" and "never less than amazing." Variety's Joe Leydon wrote: "Be prepared to laugh less at a lot more of the same thing in this overbearing but underwhelming sequel."

In the UK, the BBC's Ceefax service gave the film a mixed review. Remarked the unnamed critic who reviewed the film for the teletext service:

This sequel is disappointing and inferior to the 1996 original, but it still provides exuberant fun. The effects are so seamless and Eddie Murphy's performances as the Klumps so distinct from one another, that you really do forget it's all one actor. Janet Jackson will never be a great actress, but she pulls off her role with natural skill, something Madonna lacks to an embarrassing degree. The film's weakness is in its failure to fully realise the potential of some of its own best jokes. A restaurant scene mostly misfires simply because a lot of the dialogue is incomprehensible and the characters all talk over each other. In the original, Buddy Love was funny and charismatic. Here, he's a loud irritant, so it's just as well that the film focuses on the other Klumps.

== See also ==
- The Nutty Professor (film series)
