= Kerr-Patton House =

Historic house in North Carolina, United States

- U.S. National Register of Historic Places
- Location within North Carolina Location within the United States
- Location: NC 2133, Thompson, North Carolina
- Coordinates: 36°1′37″N 79°18′48″W
- Area: 1.3 acres (0.53 ha)
- Built: c. 1820
- Built by: Kerr, Samuel
- Architectural style: Greek Revival, Late Victorian, Federal
- NRHP reference No.: 85003083
- Added to NRHP: December 5, 1985

Kerr-Patton House, also known as the S. W. Patton House, is a historic home located near Thompson, Alamance County, North Carolina. It was built about 1820, and is a two-story, frame hall-and-parlor plan, Federal style farmhouse. A rear wing was added in the late-19th century. Also on the property are the contributing small salt house, outhouse, and the roadbed of the Great (Indian) Trading Path.

It was added to the National Register of Historic Places in 1985.
