= John Ales =

American actor

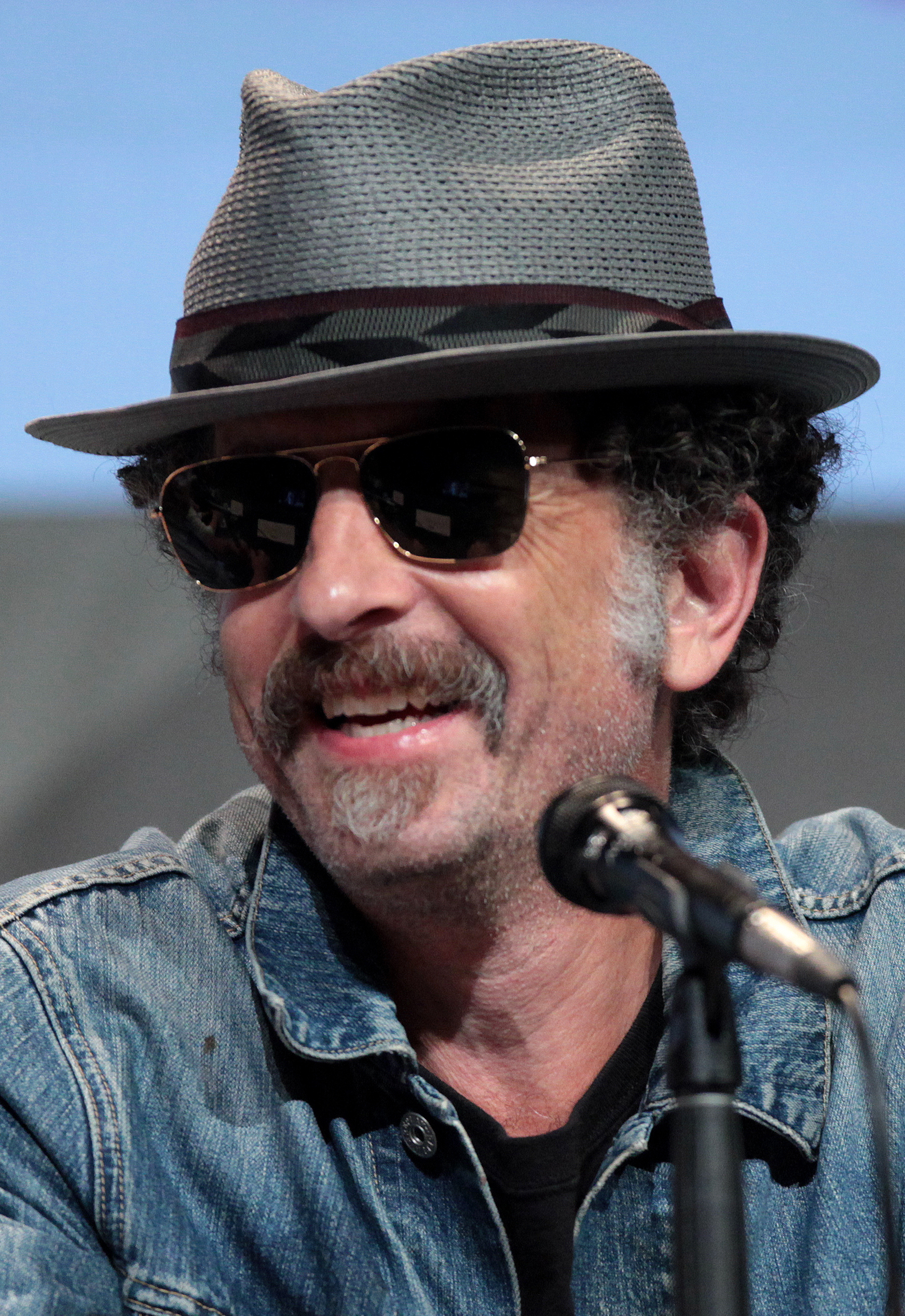
- Ales at the 2015 San Diego Comic-Con
- Occupation: Actor
- Years active: 1981–present

John Ales is an American actor.

== Career ==
Ales' best known for appearing in Spy Hard, The Nutty Professor, You Wish, and other films and television series.

== Filmography ==
=== Film ===
- Crime Killer (1985) ... Kids
- Spy Hard (1996) ... Kabul
- The Nutty Professor (1996) ... Jason
- Vibrations (1996) ... Miles
- Ride with the Devil (1999) ... William Quantrill
- Nutty Professor II: The Klumps (2000) ... Jason
- Burning Down the House (2001)
- The Zeroes (2001) ... Seth
- Life of the Party (2001) ... Artie
- Uprising (2001) ...Marek Edelman
- Living with Lou (2004) ... Lou
- D-War (2007) ... Agent Judah Campbell
- Lucky Man (2007)
- 9 Bullets (2022) ... Rabbi Stein
- Gatlopp: Hell of a Game (2022) ... Andre
- Murder at Yellowstone City (2022)
- The Blind (2023) ... Pastor Smith

=== Television ===
- Lip Service (1993-1994) ... Host
- Madman of the People (1994) ... Dylan Buckler
- You Wish (1997–1998) ... Genie
- Fantasy Island (1998) ... Nathan O'Neil
- Chicago Hope (1999) ... File Thief
- The Wild Thornberrys (2000) ... Hartebeast, Honey Badger #2
- Rocket Power (2000) ... Seal
- The Fugitive (2001) ... Dr. Felice
- Boomtown (2003) ... Shackman
- Second Time Around (2004) ... Kent Simon
- CSI: Miami (2004) ... Mike Tibbetts
- Center of the Universe (2005) ... Lex
- Without a Trace (2005) ... George Zousmer
- Mud Show (2006) ... Mookie
- Vanished (2006) ... Zach
- In Plain Sight (2008) ... Jay Allen
- CSI: Crime Scene Investigation (2009) ... Timothy Rand
- Medium (2009) ... Hal Munzell
- Beavis and Butt-Head (2011) ... Additional Voices
- Major Crimes: Final Cut (2013)...Martin Elliot
- Sex & Drugs & Rock & Roll (2015-2016) ... Rehab
- Bosch (2017) ... Andrew Holland
- Better Things (2017) ... Rodney
- Sneaky Pete (2018) ... Luka Delchev
- The Act (2019) ... Vance Godejohn
- Euphoria (2019) ... David Vaughn
- Runaways (2019) ... Quinton The Great
- Star Trek: Picard (2020) ... Bruce Maddox
- MacGyver (2020) ... Nikola Tesla
- Day by Day as Narrator (voice)
- Station 19 (2021) as Brother John
- True Story (2021)... Nikos
- Black Rabbit (2025).. Jules Zablonski
