= Corriher Grange Hall =

- U.S. National Register of Historic Places
- Location within North Carolina Location within the United States
- Location: NW of Five Points on SR 1555, near Enochville, North Carolina
- Coordinates: 35°36′4″N 80°41′43″W
- Area: 1 acre (0.40 ha)
- Built: 1916, 1938
- NRHP reference No.: 82003507
- Added to NRHP: September 23, 1982

The Corriher Grange Hall is a historic Grange Hall located near the Five Points area near Enochville, Rowan County, North Carolina. It was built in 1916, for use as a school. A gable front addition was made in 1938. It is a one-story weatherboarded vernacular frame building. It served as the community school until the end of the 1934–1935, then acquired by the local Grange for use as a meeting hall.

It was listed on the National Register of Historic Places in 1982.
