= Michael Andrew (singer) =

Jazz singer/bandleader/actor

Michael Andrew (born September 3, 1964) is a jazz singer, bandleader and actor. He married Lea Andrew in 2007, and the couple resides in Orlando, Florida.

== Early life ==
Andrew grew up in Wisconsin, attending Menomonee Falls High School. He was drawn to jazz and big band music and was influenced by singers like Mel Torme and Frank Sinatra. While in college Andrew formed a jazz group called the Michael Andrew Trio, where he performed tunes from the 1930s, 1940s and 1950s. After graduating from the University of Wisconsin-Eau Claire in 1987, Andrew began his musical career as a performer with Carnival Cruise Lines.

== Career ==
Andrew has performed in many venues. For two years from 1994 to 1996, he was the headline act at the Rainbow Room. He has toured extensively with his big band, Swingerhead, performing over 300 shows a year.

Additionally, Andrew has performed with Symphonic orchestras in Akron, Ohio, Albuquerque, New Mexico, Houston, Texas, Charlotte, North Carolina, Long Beach, California, Missoula, Montana, Orlando, Florida, Providence, Rhode Island, San Antonio, Texas, Sarasota, Florida, and Palm Beach, Florida.

He has also acted and his work has appeared in film. He played the role of a wedding singer in the 2001 movie Heartbreakers, where his music was featured. He produced "The Man with the Big Sombrero" in the 2009 film Inglourious Basterds.

Andrew starred in a musical theatre version of The Nutty Professor, in Nashville in July and August 2012. The musical's book is by Rupert Holmes, and the score is by Marvin Hamlisch. The production was directed by Jerry Lewis.

Among accolades for Andrew's work, the New York Post said Andrew was the next Harry Connick Jr. Merv Griffin called Andrew "one of the greatest singers of all time."

In 2021, Andrew produced eleven songs for the Aaron Sorkin biopic Being the Ricardos, including, "The I Love Lucy Theme Song", "Cuban Pete", and "Babalu".

== Discography ==
- Overnight Success (1995)
- That Big Red Demo CD (1997)
- I Guess I'm a Little Out of Date (1996)
- Mickey Swingerhead and the Earthgirls - Show Soundtrack (1996)
- She Could Be a Spy (1998)
- Michael Andrew Presents a Swingerhead Christmas (1999)
- Destination Moon: Michael Andrew and Swingerhead (2002)
- Michael Andrew Pays Tribute to Frank Sinatra (2002)

== Filmography ==
- Clarissa Explains It All (TV)
- Welcome Freshmen (TV)
- Camp Tanglefoot: It All Adds Up (1999)
- Heartbreakers (2001)
- Bobby Jones: Stroke of Genius (2004)
- MDA Labor Day Telethon (TV: 2006 to 2010)
- Inglourious Basterds (2009)
- Being the Ricardos (2021)
