= The Nutty Professor (character) =

Julius F. Kelp
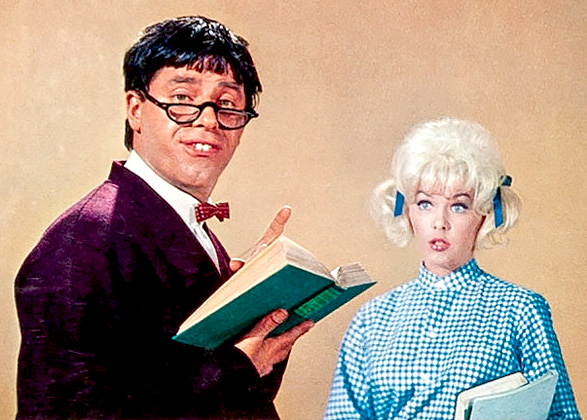
- Jerry Lewis as Julius Kelp
- First appearance: The Nutty Professor
- Created by: Jerry Lewis
- Portrayed by: Jerry Lewis
- Voiced by: Jerry Lewis

In-universe information
- Full name: Julius F. Kelp
- Alias: Buddy Love (alternate personality)
- Nickname: Mr. Kelp
- Gender: Male
- Occupation: College professor
- Family: Elmer Kelp (father); Edwina Kelp (mother)
- Significant other: Stella Purdy
- Relatives: Harold Kelp (grandson)
- Religion: Roman Catholic
- Nationality: American

Sherman Klump
- Eddie Murphy as Sherman Klump in The Nutty Professor (1996)
- First appearance: The Nutty Professor (1996)
- Last appearance: Nutty Professor II: The Klumps (2000)
- Created by: Eddie Murphy
- Portrayed by: Eddie Murphy; Myles Mason, Jeffrey Michael Freeman, Maurice Colquitt, Kevin Michael Mondane (infants)

In-universe information
- Full name: Sherman Klump
- Aliases: Buddy Love (abnormal genetic self and clone)
- Nickname: Professor Klump
- Gender: Male
- Occupation: College professor
- Family: Cletus Klump (father); Anna Pearl Jenson-Klump (mother); Ernest "Ernie" Klump, Sr. (brother)
- Spouse: Professor Denise Gaines-Klump (wife)
- Significant other: Carla Purty
- Relatives: Ida Mae Jenson (maternal grandmother); Ernest "Ernie" Klump Jr. (nephew)
- Religion: Presbyterian
- Nationality: American

The Nutty Professor (known as Julius F. Kelp in the original film (1963) and as Prof. Sherman Klump in the 1996 remake, and by his alter ego Buddy Love in both films) is a fictional character portrayed by Jerry Lewis in The Nutty Professor and its respective sequel, and by Eddie Murphy in the 1996 version and its 2000 sequel Nutty Professor II: The Klumps.

Julius F. Kelp is an awkward, shy, accident-prone, polite, and intelligent chemistry professor. Sherman Klump is an obese, jolly, and kind-hearted science teacher at Welman College. Buddy Love, meanwhile, is a charismatic lothario with narcissistic and sociopathic tendencies.

Murphy also played the rest of Klump's family in the sequel. Lewis was not fond of Murphy's characters, in particular due to the fart jokes used in the films.

Alongside "inhuman professors" inspired by the perceived motivations of scientists in the Manhattan Project, the Nutty Professor is an example of a stock character and stereotype of the "absent-minded professor", which was prevalent during the 1960s.

== Films ==
=== The Nutty Professor (1963) ===
In the 1963 film Professor Julius Kelp is known for his clumsiness and generally shy and awkward demeanor. When he meets the beautiful and attentive Ms. Stella Purdy (Stella Stevens) he tries various methods to have a more charming persona. When he creates his serum, it seems at first to have terrible consequences, but this revealed to have been a nightmare when he arrives at the local bar as Buddy Love, a suave "ladies' man" known for his ease for words and assertiveness but also for his brash behavior and aggressive attitude. He also shown singing and playing the piano. Nevertheless, the serum seems to dwindle as he reverts after a short while and even seems to lose his singing at times. At the end the serum's effect ends and he reverts in the midst of a song with the school's big band.

=== The Nutty Professor (1996) ===
Throughout the first film, Professor Sherman Klump is portrayed as highly intelligent and generally respected by his students, as well as being a fundamentally friendly man who has occasional clumsy accidents due to his obesity. Additionally, his lack of confidence makes him a victim to bullying and criticism from the Dean of the university. Having recently fallen in love with grad student and chemistry teacher Carla Purty (Jada Pinkett Smith), Klump uses his latest discovery, a weight-loss serum that rewrites the subject's genes, to lose weight in order to spend time with her. This serum creates the confident but mean-spirited individual known as Buddy Love, as the testosterone imbalance caused by the transformation results in Buddy manifesting as an independent personality instead of just being a thin Sherman. When Klump's student and assistant Jason learns what has happened, he realizes that Buddy is gaining increasingly greater freedom from the professor's influence. This encourages Klump to take back control of his life, disposing of most of the serum and "fighting" Buddy for control of the body before Buddy can drink enough of the last samples of the serum to eliminate Klump forever. At the conclusion, Klump admits what has happened to the faculty staff after he transforms back to normal in public, concluding that he must learn to accept himself as he is.

=== Nutty Professor II: The Klumps (2000) ===
In the second movie Klump's kind personality is polluted by the Buddy Love gene in his DNA, causing him to occasionally say offensive or insulting things to people, especially when talking to his new love interest Denise Gaines (Janet Jackson). In an attempt to eliminate this, Klump uses a risky experiment to extract Buddy's DNA from his system, but his plan backfires and results in Buddy manifesting as an independent entity (albeit with some dog-like traits as a result his genetic make-up filling up the gaps with canine DNA). Klump proposes to Denise, who happily accepts, but Klump gradually begins to lose his intelligence due to the damage his brain cells have sustained due to Buddy's genes being extracted from his system. Eventually, he comes up with a plan to reabsorb Buddy by using a powerful version of his new youth serum to regress Buddy to amniotic fluid allowing him to drink Buddy and regain his old intellect. However, Buddy escapes and is able to evade Klump long enough to evaporate. Denise and Klump's father, Cletus, arrive just in time to help him when he loses his intelligence. Cletus and Denise force Klump to drink the water from a fountain, which contains Buddy's genetic pattern, and he regains his intelligence. Later, he and Denise are married.

=== In other media ===
Sherman Klump appears in the third season Robot Chicken episode "Endless Breadsticks".

== Reception ==
In Beyond the Stars, Kenneth von Gunden called Professor Julius F. Kelp one of Jerry Lewis' best roles. Describing him as a "peculiarly American stock character" similar to Ned Brainard in The Absent-Minded Professor, Gunden states that he represents a man who has put all his energy into harnessing his intellectual side, but had none left for socializing, sexuality or common sense. Kelp represents a popular culture message that becoming a great thinker and doer will cost one a great deal. Through the alter-ego of Buddy Love, Jerry Lewis also tried to demonstrate his ability to play different roles after being typecast numerous times as the "kid", a crazy man-child.

In Comedy Is a Man in Trouble, Alan S. Dale states that Kelp is Jerry Lewis acting out "the two poles of his personality", the innocent one that made him a star, and a callous, successful persona he had kept well-hidden. Dale describes Buddy Love as representing Lewis' true personality as a "bastard-mogul", comparing him to Charlie Chaplin's "brilliantly heartless" Tramp persona, or the Great Dictator but "even more inappropriately egomaniacal". He describes Lewis as funnier playing Buddy Love than Kelp.

David Denby of New York magazine, calling the remake a "personal triumph for Eddie Murphy", described Buddy Love as portrayed by Eddie Murphy as, conversely, being similar to Murphy's typical stage persona, while Professor Sherman Klump was the outlier. However, Klump emerges as the hero, with Love representing the "destructive and horrifying" aspects of his old screen character.
