= Larry Miller (comedian) =

American comedian (born 1953)

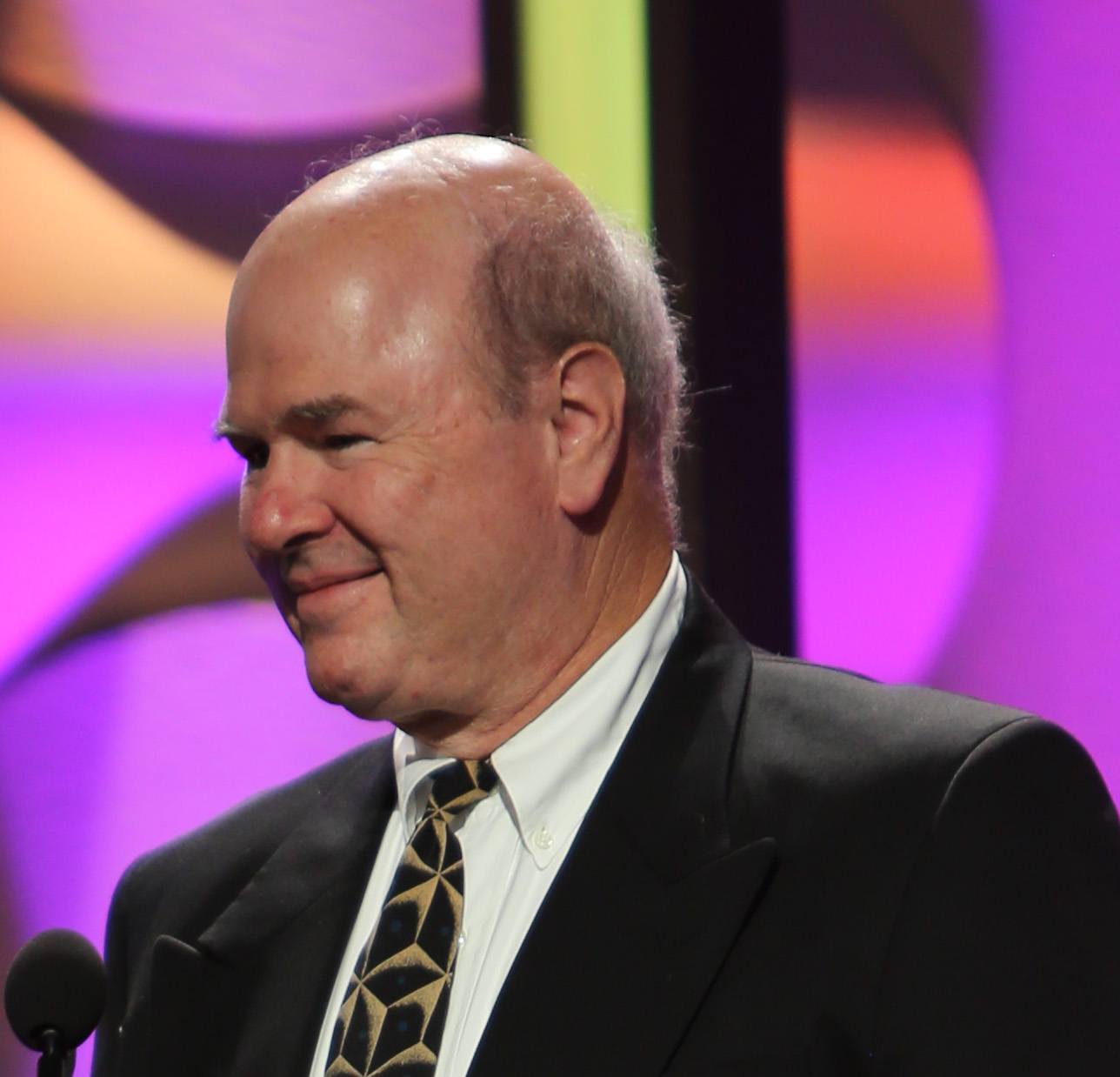
- Miller in 2014
- Born: Lawrence John Miller; October 15, 1953 (age 72); New York City, U.S.
- Education: Amherst College (BA)
- Occupations: Comedian; actor; voice actor; podcaster; columnist
- Years active: 1982–present
- Spouse: Eileen Conn (m. 1993)
- Children: 2

Lawrence John Miller (born October 15, 1953) is an American comedian, actor, voice actor, podcaster, and columnist. He is primarily regarded as a character actor, with The A.V. Club noting that he "can be counted upon to improve every film or television show he appears in". His better known roles include Lou Bonaparte in Mad About You (1993–1998), Pointy-haired Boss in Dilbert (1999–2000), Edwin Poole in Boston Legal (2004–2008), Mr. Hollister in Pretty Woman (1990), Dean Richmond in The Nutty Professor (1996) and Nutty Professor II: The Klumps (2000), Walter Stratford in 10 Things I Hate About You (1999), Principal Elliot T. Jindraike in Max Keeble's Big Move (2001), and Paolo Puttanesca in The Princess Diaries (2001) and The Princess Diaries 2: Royal Engagement (2004). He reprised his role as Walter Stratford in the television series 10 Things I Hate About You (2009–2010).

Miller has also served as one of the regular players in Christopher Guest's mockumentary films.

== Early life and education ==
Miller was born in Brooklyn into a Jewish family, and grew up in Valley Stream, New York, on Long Island. He studied music (voice, cello, piano, drums) at Amherst College.

== Career ==
Miller's first acting job was as the emcee on the TV series Fame. He gained mainstream attention for his part in popular scenes of Pretty Woman involving him as a store clerk for the main characters.

His film roles include Walter Stratford in 10 Things I Hate About You as well as several characters in Christopher Guest's mockumentary films. He has held prominent supporting roles in Carry On Columbus, Radioland Murders, The Nutty Professor, Nutty Professor II: The Klumps, and Max Keeble's Big Move. He has over 50 film appearances.

He was part of the main cast of Life's Work, The Pursuit of Happiness, and High School Cupid, a Cupid Inc. Story. He is also a frequent guest actor on television, most notably as the nasty doorman on Seinfeld in the episode "The Doorman". He played Edwin Poole in the ABC dramedy Boston Legal. He played nightclub owner Michael Dobson in two Law & Order episodes, first in the episode "Coma" and then later in "Encore". Miller appeared as himself in a third episode, "Smoke". He was also in 8 Simple Rules, where he played Tommy, Kyle's obnoxious father and Paul's (John Ritter) colleague.

Miller is a friend of Jerry Seinfeld, and auditioned for the part of George Costanza.

=== Other work ===
As a stand-up comic, he is best known for his monologue "The Five Levels of Drinking", which Vulture hailed as "masterful, well-written, and influential".

From 2002 to 2004, Miller wrote a column for the magazine The Weekly Standard that usually ran once every two weeks. Since then, he continued to occasionally contribute to the magazine, and to the Washington Examiner, which absorbed The Weekly Standard when it ceased publication. His subject matter has included politics as well as reminiscences about fellow entertainers and anecdotes from his own life.

Two of the columns he wrote in 2002 served as the text for frequently forwarded emails at the time, though in both cases his words were attributed to others. The first was his very first Weekly Standard column in January 2002, in which he mocked various anti-war platitudes of the time; the text was incorrectly attributed to retired Air Force general Richard E. Hawley. The second was an April 2002 column defending Israel in the Israeli–Palestinian conflict, which was attributed to fellow comedian Dennis Miller. Another email which also began to be forwarded in 2002, purporting to offer "George Carlin's Views on Aging", was derived in part from a stand-up routine that Larry Miller performed in the 1990s.

Miller began a weekly podcast on the Carolla Digital Network, This Week with Larry Miller, suspending it after falling and injuring his head severely in April 2012. After hospitalization and a coma, he said in January 2013 that he was convalescing. Miller resumed the podcast on January 9, 2013. In February 2015, the podcast was retitled The Larry Miller Show with direct distribution. The podcast ended on December 2, 2020. Miller referred to it as the "grand finale" after not broadcasting a new show in the previous six months. The show page cited issues with producing the show safely during the COVID-19 pandemic in the United States.

== Personal life ==
Miller married television writer Eileen Conn in 1993. The couple have two children.

Miller was hospitalized after hitting his head in a fall. He went into a coma and was put on life support for one month after the accident. He made a complete recovery.

== Filmography ==
=== Film ===
Year	Film	Role	Notes
1989	Three Fugitives	Street Cop - Second Officer	
1989	Out Cold	Plumber No. 2	
1990	Pretty Woman	Mr. Hollister	
1990	Almost an Angel	Teller	
1991	L.A. Story	Tom	
1991	Suburban Commando	Adrian Beltz	
1991	Necessary Roughness	Dean Phillip Elias	
1991	Frankenstein: The College Years	Professor Loman	Television film
1992	Carry On Columbus	The Chief	
1992	Frozen Assets	Newton Patterson	
1993	Undercover Blues	Halsey	
1993	Dream Lover	Norman	
1994	The Favor	Joe Dubin	
1994	Corrina, Corrina	Sid	
1994	Radioland Murders	Herman Katzenback	
1995	The Computer Wore Tennis Shoes	Dean Al Valentine	Television film
1996	The Nutty Professor	Dean Richmond	
1996	Waiting for Guffman	Mayor Glenn Welsch	
1996	Dear God	State Judge	
1997	For Richer or Poorer	IRS Inspector Derek Lester	
1997	Bayou Ghost	Reverend Carmichael	
1998	Chairman of the Board	Bradford McMillan	
1998	Carnival of Souls	Louis Seagram	
1999	The Minus Man	Paul	
1999	10 Things I Hate About You	Walter Stratford	
1999	Runaway Bride	N.Y.C. Bartender Kevin	Uncredited
1999	The Big Tease	Dunston Cactus	
1999	Pros & Cons	Ben Babbitt	
2000	Nutty Professor II: The Klumps	Dean Richmond	
2000	Best in Show	Max Berman	
2001	What's the Worst That Could Happen?	Earl Radburn	
2001	The Princess Diaries	Paolo	Uncredited
2001	Max Keeble's Big Move	Principal Elliot T. Jindraike	
2002	Teddy Bears' Picnic		Uncredited
2003	A Guy Thing	Minister Ferris	Uncredited
2003	A Mighty Wind	Wally Fenton	
2004	Raising Helen	Car Buyer	Uncredited
2004	The Princess Diaries 2: Royal Engagement	Paolo	
2005	Kiss Kiss Bang Bang	Dabney Shaw	
2005	The Aristocrats	Himself	Documentary
2005	Uncommon Sense	Larry	Television film
2005	Life of the Party	Dr. Trent	
2006	Keeping Up with the Steins	Arnie Stein	
2006	Lance is a Jerk	Ron DeLuca	
2006	The Ant Bully	Fred Nickle	Voice
2006	For Your Consideration	Syd Finkleman	
2007	The Pre Nup	Daniel	Short
2007	Chasing Robert	Peter Vondra	
2007	Bagboy	Pike	
2007	The Final Season	Roger Dempsey	Voice
2007	Bee Movie	Buzzwell	Voice
2007	Blonde Ambition	Richard Connelly	
2008	Get Smart	CIA Agent	
2008	Senior Skip Day	Principal Dickwalder	
2008	The Spleenectomy	Sir Henry Pierre	Short
2008	The Other End of the Line	Kit Hawksin	
2009	The Six Wives of Henry Lefay	Lipschutz	
2010	Valentine's Day	Oversized Baggage Agent	
2010	Alpha and Omega	Marcel	Voice
2010	Keep It in Your Pants	Doctor Rosenrosen	
2010	Federal Bureau of Manners: The Nod		Short
2010	Federal Bureau of Manners: Cell Phones		Short
2011	New Year's Eve	Harley	Segment "Ahern Party"
2011	Deck the Halls	Willie Meehan	Television film
2012	Foodfight!	Vlad Chocool	Voice
2012	General Education	Rich Collins	
2012	The Mystery Cruise	Willy Meehan	
2014	Night Vet	Rich	Short
2014	New Soul	New Soul Advisor No. 51	Short
2015	Road Hard	Barry 'Baby Doll' Weissman	
2015	Pearly Gates	Rabbi	
2016	Hot Bot	Senator Biter	
2016	Mother's Day	Motorcycle Cop	
2018	Rock Steady Row	The Dean	
2018	The Man Who Killed Hitler and Then the Bigfoot	Ed	
2018	Second Act	Weiskopf	
2020	Love, Weddings & Other Disasters		Story only
2021	More than Miyagi, The Pat Morita Story	Himself	Documentary

=== Television ===
Year	Title	Role	Notes
1982	Fame	The Emcee	Episode: "But Seriously, Folks"
1984	Late Night with David Letterman	Himself	Episode: "October 4, 1984"
1984	The Bob Monkhouse Show	Himself	Episode #1.7
1986–1989	The Tonight Show Starring Johnny Carson	Himself	3 episodes
1995	Seinfeld	Doorman	Episode: "The Doorman"
1995	Dr. Katz, Professional Therapist	Himself	Voice, episode: "Everybody's Got a Tushy"
1995	The Single Guy	The Cable Guy	Episode: "Pilot"
1995	The Pursuit of Happiness	Larry Rutledge	7 episodes
1990–1996	Dream On	Sergeant McDougal/Irwin Bader	9 episodes
1996	Boston Common	Warren	Episode: "Everybody's Stalking"
1996–1997	Life's Work	Jerome Nash	18 episodes
1997	George & Leo	Lloyd	Episode: "The Bribe"
1997	Just Shoot Me!	Emerson Gray	Episode: "The Assistant"
1993–1998	Mad About You	Lou Bonaparte	5 episodes
1998	The Larry Sanders Show	Himself	Episode: "I Buried Sid"
1998	Michael Hayes	Orwell	2 episodes
1998	3rd Rock from the Sun	Garvin	Episode: "Dr. Solomon's Traveling Show"
1998–1999	Hercules	Lynceus	Voice, 2 episodes
2000	Zoe, Duncan, Jack & Jane	Professor	Episode: "No Good Deed"
1999–2000	Dilbert	Pointy-haired Boss	Voice, 30 episodes
2000	Bull	C.J. Cox	4 episodes
2000–2001	DAG	Special Agent Nash	2 episodes
2000–2001	Buzz Lightyear of Star Command	XR	Voice, 38 episodes
2001	TV Funhouse	Narrator	Voice, episode: "Astronaut Day"
2001	The Weakest Link	Himself (contestant)	Episode: "Scene Stealers Edition"
2002	Providence	Dr. Minkus	Episode: "Shadow Play"
2002	The Guardian	Dale Petrocki	Episode: "Lawyers, Guns and Money"
2002	My Wife and Kids	Stuart Tyler	3 episodes
2002	The Mind of the Married Man	Ernie Spivak	Episode: "Peter Pan"
1994–2003	Law & Order	Michael Dobson, Himself	3 episodes
2003	The Brotherhood of Poland, New Hampshire	Scott Haggis	4 episodes
2002–2003	8 Simple Rules	Tommy	12 episodes
2004	King of the Hill	Doctor Tabor	Voice, episode: "Dale Be Not Proud"
2005	Desperate Housewives	Leonard Harper	Episode: "Color and Light"
2006	The Tonight Show with Jay Leno	Charlie Brown	Episode #14.224
2007	Medium	Dylan Kravitz	Episode: "Joe Day Afternoon"
2005–2007	Monk	Garrett Price	2 episodes
2008	Dirt	Bill Hope	Episode: "God Bless the Child"
2008	Burn Notice	Harvey Gunderson	Episode: "Comrades"
2004–2008	Boston Legal	Edwin Poole	4 episodes
2009	Tim and Eric Awesome Show, Great Job!	Larry Steves	Episode: "Hair"
2009–2010	10 Things I Hate About You	Walter Stratford	20 episodes
2010	Gravity	Dr. Tepperman	4 episodes
2010	Aqua Teen Hunger Force	Himself	Voice, episode: "Larry Miller Hair System"
2010	Late Night Liars	Himself	Episode #1.1
2011	The Protector	Alan Bronski	Episode: "Help"
2011	Curb Your Enthusiasm	Eddie Kravitz	Episode: "Palestinian Chicken"
2011	Shake It Up	Larry Diller	Episode: "Camp It Up"
2012	Bent	Bob	Episode: "A-Game"
2011–2012	The Penguins of Madagascar	Clemson	Voice, 3 episodes
2013	Devious Maids	Frank	Episode: "Cleaning Out the Closet"
2013	Liv and Maddie	Principal Fickman	Episode: "Team-A-Rooney"
2014	Hot in Cleveland	Larry	Episode: "Elka Takes a Lover"
2014	Comedy Bang! Bang!	Jery Pickens	Episode: "Alison Brie Wears a Black Mesh Top & Mini-Skirt"
2014	Mystery Girls	Arthur J. Stanwick	Episode: "Passing the Torch"
2015	Clipped	Unnamed character	Episode: "Free Wednesday"
2017	Runaways	Phil	Episode: "Rewind"
2016–2017	High School Cupid, a Cupid Inc. Story	Principal Perkales	9 episodes
2011–2019	NCIS	Ed Slater	2 episodes

=== Videos ===
Year	Video	Role	Notes
2000	Buzz Lightyear of Star Command: The Adventure Begins	XR	Voice
2005	Final Approach	Walter	
2005	The Legend of Frosty the Snowman	Principal Pankley	Voice
2008	Senior Skip Day	Mr. Frankfurt Dickwalder	
2008	Get Smart's Bruce and Lloyd Out of Control	Underchief, CIA Chief	

=== Video games ===
Year	Game	Role	Notes
2000	Buzz Lightyear of Star Command	XR	Voice
