= Elvia Allman =

American actress (1904–1992)

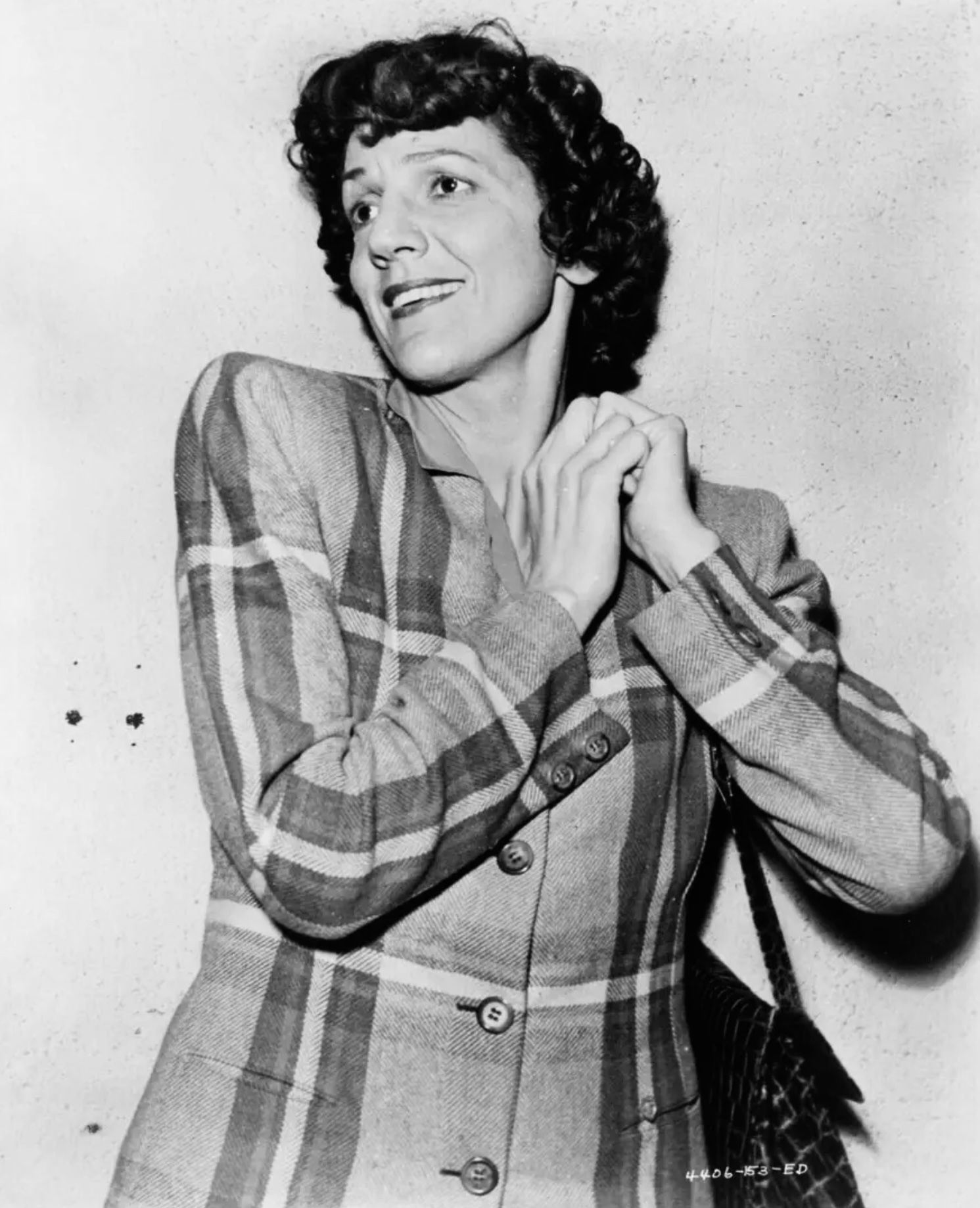
- Allman in A WAVE, a WAC and a Marine (1944)
- Born: September 19, 1904; Enochville, North Carolina, U.S.
- Died: March 6, 1992 (aged 87); Santa Monica, California, U.S.
- Resting place: Forest Lawn Memorial Park, Glendale, California, U.S.
- Occupation: Actress
- Years active: 1926–1992
- Spouses: Wesley Benton Tourtellotte (m. 1930; div. 1933) C. C. Pyle (m. 1937; died 1939) Jerome Laveck Bayler (m. 1945; died 1978)

Elvia Beatrice Allman (September 19, 1904 – March 6, 1992) was an American actress in Hollywood films and television programs for over 50 years. She is best remembered for her semi-regular roles on The Beverly Hillbillies and Petticoat Junction and for being the voice of Walt Disney's Clarabelle Cow. Her mark in TV history is also ensured by her memorable performance as the stern, no-nonsense boss in the classic I Love Lucy candy factory episode "Job Switching" with a repeat appearance as Nancy Graham the reporter in the 1955 episode "The Homecoming".

== Early years ==
Allman was born September 19, 1904, in Enochville, North Carolina.

== Career ==
=== Radio career ===
In 1926, Allman was a children's story reader at KHJ in Los Angeles (another source says 1930). The Los Angeles Times of the day praised her abilities as a dialectician. She married Wesley B. Tourtellotte on August 2, 1930, and divorced within several years. In 1933, she moved to the east coast, billing herself as the "California Cocktail" and began a musical program on NBC. On October 30, 1933, the Times announced she was moving to KNX on a 15-minute program to be heard Tuesday and Thursday evenings. What was supposed to be a long-term contract ended March 3, 1935.

Allman's first big network radio successes were on the Blue Monday Jamboree (where she portrayed beauty expert Auntie MacCasser, high society matron Octavia Smith-Whiffen, and home economist Pansy Pennypincher), and on The Komedy Kingdom (as "Elvia, The Queen of Mirth"). She made her debut on The Pepsodent Show starring Bob Hope as man-chasing Cobina, a parody of society debutante Cobina Wright. She portrayed the role in motion pictures and even spoofed it in the Merrie Melodies cartoon Goofy Groceries. Allman was frequently heard as a supporting actress in various comedy programs well into the 1950s and in the 1970s returned to radio acting with its brief revival of new programs.

In the mid-1930s, Allman appeared in cartoons for producer Leon Schlesinger, released through Warner Bros. She can be heard in the first Porky Pig cartoon I Haven't Got a Hat in 1935. She may have originated the character of Clarabelle Cow prior to this, but there are no records indicating the specific cartoons in which she voiced Clarabelle, who was featured in 28 Disney cartoons from 1928 to 1942. In 1937 Allman voiced the title role in the cartoon Little Red Walking Hood, a spoof of Little Red Riding Hood. Allman married sports promoter C. C. Pyle on July 3, 1937, and was with him when he died on February 3, 1939.

Allman also played Tootsie Sagwell on The George Burns and Gracie Allen Show during the early 1940s. Allman's other roles included Mrs. Kennedy on The Adventures of Maisie, Penelope the Pelican on The Cinnamon Bear, and Cuddles Bongschnook on The Durante-Moore Show. Programs on which she was a regular included The Abbott and Costello Show, The Baby Snooks Show, The Judy Canova Show, and The Ray Bolger Show.

=== Acting career ===
In 1928, Allman acted in The Living Corpse a production of the Pasadena Community Players.

Allman made her film debut as an actress in 1940's The Road to Singapore in an unbilled bit (as were the majority of Allman's motion picture appearances in the 1940s) as a homely woman who pursues Bob Hope. One of her more steady radio gigs was on the Blondie radio series in the part of Cora Dithers, the domineering wife of Dagwood Bumstead's boss.

In the 1950s, Allman became a familiar face to television viewers with numerous guest appearances on many programs of the era, usually situation comedies. She made multiple appearances on I Married Joan, December Bride, The Bob Cummings Show, and The Abbott and Costello Show, three appearances on I Love Lucy and an appearance in an episode of Colgate Theatre.

In 1957, Allman reprised her role of Cora Dithers in a short-lived TV adaption of Blondie. Allman had earlier played the role in the 1940s on several episodes of the Blondie radio series. She also appeared on seven episodes of the TV series The Jack Benny Program, having worked often with Benny on his radio program in the 1940s and 1950s.

Her visibility on television increased during the 1960s with guest shots on The Dick Van Dyke Show, Hazel, The New Phil Silvers Show, The Addams Family, The Munsters, Mr Ed, Bewitched, The Lucy Show, The Doris Day Show, The Andy Griffith Show, and as witness Julia Slovak in the fifth season, 1961 Perry Mason episode, "The Case of the Brazen Bequest". Allman's greatest fame came as Elverna Bradshaw on The Beverly Hillbillies (13 appearances, one in 1963, the rest 1968–1970). The 1960s proved to be her most prolific era with 58 appearances on various television series as well as five motion pictures including Breakfast at Tiffany's and The Nutty Professor.

Allman appeared as Oscar Madison's mother in one episode of the TV series The Odd Couple in which she and Oscar are treated to an erotic belly dance at a Greek restaurant. Allman's career slowed considerably after 1972, and her only television work during the remainder of the decade was in the 1977 television film Halloween with the New Addams Family. Her career picked up in the 1980s with eleven television appearances, including two episodes of Murder She Wrote. In addition to her acting career, Allman also worked as a real estate agent during the 1970s and '80s. In her autobiography, Mary Tyler Moore credits Allman with finding her house as did Betty White in her book Here We Go Again.

Allman's final work appropriately brought her full circle, reviving the voice of Clarabelle Cow for the first time in over 50 years in the Mickey Mouse cartoon feature version of The Prince and the Pauper in 1990.

== Death ==
Allman died in Santa Monica, California, March 6, 1992, from pneumonia, aged 87. She was predeceased by her last husband, Jerome L. Bayler, in 1978. Allman is buried at Forest Lawn Memorial Park, Glendale, California.

== Filmography ==
Year	Title	Role	Notes
1938	Thanks for Everything	Violinist	Uncredited
1940	Road to Singapore	Homely Girl	Uncredited
1940	A Night at Earl Carroll's	Cobina Gusher	
1940	Melody for Three	Radio Station Receptionist	Uncredited
1941	Sis Hopkins	Ripple	
1941	Time Out for Rhythm	Cobrina	
1941	Swing It Soldier	Cobina	
1942	Sweetheart of the Fleet	Cobina (as Brenda & Cobina)	
1943	Three Hearts for Julia	Eva	Uncredited
1943	No Place for a Lady	Mrs. Willow	Uncredited
1944	In Society	Hysterical Widow	Uncredited
1944	A Wave, a WAC and a Marine	Elvira Allman - Woman in Cab	
1944	Carolina Blues	Loud Kyser Fan	Uncredited
1948	The Noose Hangs High	Woman	Uncredited
1951	Week-End with Father	Mrs. G.	
1956	The Kettles in the Ozarks	Meek Man's Wife	Uncredited
1956	You Can't Run Away from It	Ma, Vernon's Wife	
1961	The Pleasure of His Company	Mrs. Mooney	
1961	Breakfast at Tiffany's	Librarian	
1963	The Nutty Professor	Edwina Kelp	
1963	Johnny Cool	Beauty Salon Receptionist	Uncredited
1964	Honeymoon Hotel	Mrs. Sampson	
1967	Eight on the Lam	Neighbor	Uncredited
