= Gen. William Kerr House =

Historic house in North Carolina, United States

- U.S. National Register of Historic Places
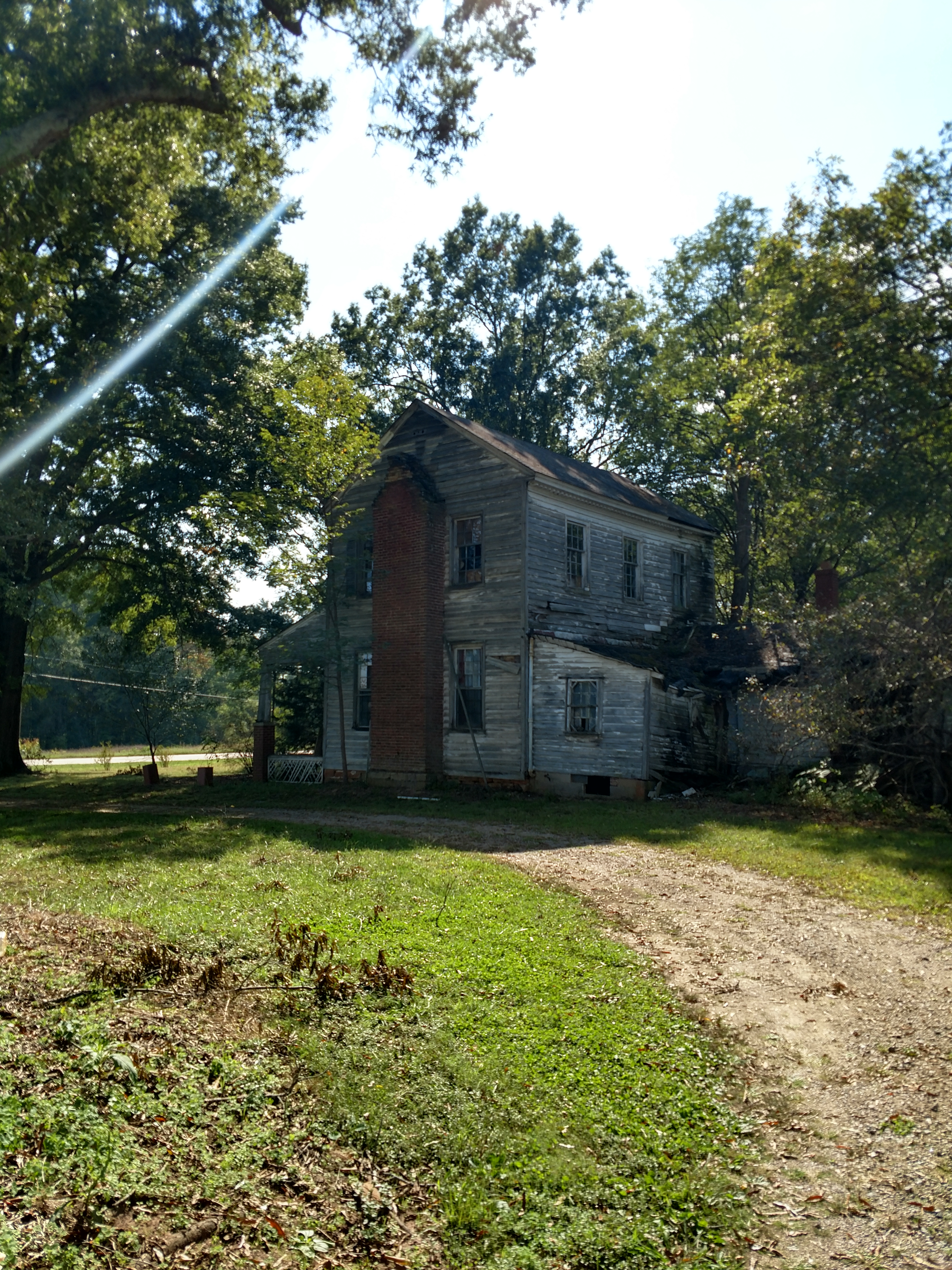

- Location within North Carolina Location within the United States
- Location: 3480 Deal Road, near Enochville, North Carolina
- Coordinates: 35°32′37.489″N 80°43′29.927″W
- Area: 58.5 acres (23.7 ha)
- Built: 1817-1820
- Architectural style: Federal
- NRHP reference No.: 82003505
- Added to NRHP: September 23, 1982

Gen. William H. Kerr House is a historic home located on Deal Road (formerly Beatties Ford Road), near Enochville, North Carolina, United States.

The house was built between 1817 and 1820, and is a two-story, three-bay, Federal style frame dwelling. It has a rebuilt front porch and one-story ell and shed dating to the late 1930s. It was listed on the National Register of Historic Places in 1982.
