= The Nutty Professor (1996 film) =

- Theatrical release poster
- Directed by: Tom Shadyac
- Screenplay by: David Sheffield; Barry W. Blaustein; Tom Shadyac; Steve Oedekerk
- Based on: The Nutty Professor; 1963 film by Jerry Lewis; Bill Richmond
- Produced by: Brian Grazer; Russell Simmons
- Starring: Eddie Murphy; Jada Pinkett; James Coburn; Dave Chappelle
- Cinematography: Julio Macat
- Edited by: Don Zimmerman
- Music by: David Newman
- Production company: Imagine Entertainment
- Distributed by: Universal Pictures
- Release date: June 28, 1996
- Running time: 95 minutes
- Country: United States
- Language: English
- Budget: $54 million
- Box office: $274 million

The Nutty Professor is a 1996 American science fiction comedy film starring Eddie Murphy as the titular character. It is a remake of the 1963 film, which starred Jerry Lewis. Directed by Tom Shadyac, it co-stars Jada Pinkett, James Coburn, Larry Miller, Dave Chappelle, and John Ales. Filming began in May 1995 and wrapped in September 1995. The original music score was composed by David Newman.

The Nutty Professor was released by Universal Pictures on June 28, 1996, and was a commercial and critical success. It won Best Makeup at the 69th Academy Awards. The film's success spawned a sequel, Nutty Professor II: The Klumps, released in 2000.

== Plot ==
Sherman Klump, a morbidly obese, kind-hearted professor at Wellman College, creates an experimental formula that reconstructs someone's DNA to make weight loss easier. Sherman, during a date at a club with Carla Purty, a chemistry graduate who is a big fan of his work, is made fun of for his weight by comedian Reggie Warrington. This influences him to test his serum on himself the next morning, losing 250 pounds within seconds. He initially celebrates the weight loss, but later finds the effects of the serum are only temporary. Sherman adopts a false identity, "Buddy Love", and invites Carla out on a date at the same club again. Reggie is present again, and Sherman takes revenge by heckling him mercilessly. Sherman's "Buddy" persona starts to develop an independent personality due to the heightened testosterone levels of the transformation, gradually changing from his regular good-natured self to perverted and super-confident. This transformation is seen by Klump's lab assistant Jason at the college.

Buddy's identity also takes over Sherman's job and all the credit for his work. He meets Dean Richmond and wealthy businessman Harlan Hartley, the former planning to donate $10,000,000 to the science department. Buddy shows the serum, which impresses Hartley and Dean Richmond to the point where they invite him to the Alumni Ball the next night. Buddy then cheats on Carla with three women, and Carla dumps him out of disgust. After being fired as professor, Sherman attempts to stop the alter ego by destroying all of the serum samples, which he does with Jason's help. However, Buddy is hiding a sample of the serum in one of Sherman's diet shake cans, which Sherman drinks, causing him to transform into Buddy again.

Jason discovers Buddy's testosterone levels are at a lethally high 60,000%, and gets to the ball in the middle of Buddy's demonstration of the serum. Buddy plans to drink the serum to kill Sherman permanently, resulting in a fight between the two identities. Sherman eventually transforms into his regular self and admits his misdeeds to the shocked audience, including his parents and Carla. As he leaves, Carla stops him and asks why he lied; he says he did not believe that she would accept him. While they don't initiate a romantic relationship, Sherman and Carla remain friends and share a dance together. Richmond rehires Sherman and Hartley gives the donation to Sherman.

== Cast ==
- Eddie Murphy as:
  - Sherman Klump, a morbidly obese and kind-hearted professor
  - Buddy Love, Sherman's thin alter-ego
  - Lance Perkins, a parody of Richard Simmons
  - Papa Klump, Sherman's father
  - Mama Klump, Sherman's mother
  - Grandma Klump, Anna's mother and Sherman's maternal grandmother
  - Ernie Klump, Sherman's older brother
- Jada Pinkett as Carla Purty
- James Coburn as Harlan Hartley
- Larry Miller as Dean Richmond
- Dave Chappelle as Reggie Warrington, a Def Jam comedian
- John Ales as Jason
- Jamal Mixon as Ernie Klump Jr., Sherman's nephew
- Montell Jordan as himself
- Ned Luke as a construction worker
- Athena Massey, Lisa Boyle and Alexia Robinson as "sexy girls"

== Production ==
Producer Brian Grazer pursued the idea of remaking The Nutty Professor with a black lead after it was suggested to him by music producer Russell Simmons. Murphy and Grazer had hoped John Landis would direct, having previously worked successfully with Murphy. Ultimately, Tom Shadyac, the director of Ace Ventura: Pet Detective, joined the project. The Nutty Professor was the first Tom Shadyac film to feature outtakes over the closing credits. Murphy, Barry Blaustein, David Sheffield and Steve Oedekerk worked together on the screenplay. The film is not a strict remake of the Jerry Lewis film; Murphy said, "we stripped down the story to its bare bones and built it up to this whole different thing", adding elements from the story of Jekyll and Hyde as well as Cyrano de Bergerac. Pinkett declined to play a role in Independence Day in order to star in The Nutty Professor.

The film has a series of scenes with Murphy and comedian Dave Chappelle who plays insult comic Reggie Warrington. Much of their dialogue was improvised. Murphy was one of Chappelle's biggest comedic influences. Reggie Warrington is named after Reginald and Warrington Hudlin, brothers, and directors of one of Murphy's previous films, Boomerang. Reginald Hudlin was surprised to see the character was named after him and his brother, and to see the character violently stuffed into a piano.

The film was made with the help of Jerry Lewis. He was an executive producer for both this film and the 2000 sequel Nutty Professor II: The Klumps. In 2009, he expressed regret for allowing the remakes, saying, "I have such respect for Eddie, but I should not have done it. What I did was perfect the first time around and all you're going to do is diminish that perfection by letting someone else do it."

Rick Baker created the fat suits for Murphy. They were made from urethane foam and a spandex suit, and filled with pockets of liquid to make it jiggle believably. It took three hours to apply the makeup each day. Baker praised Murphy, saying, "He really makes the stuff come to life, and he never complains. When we did The Nutty Professor [...], he spent 80-odd days in the makeup chair. As much as I love makeup, even I would have been complaining by the end, but Eddie didn't."

== Music ==
Year	Title	Chart positions		Certifications (sales thresholds)
Year	Title	U.S.	U.S. R&B	Certifications (sales thresholds)
1996	The Nutty Professor: Released: June 4, 1996; Label: Def Jam	8	1	US: Platinum

== Release ==
=== Home media ===
The Nutty Professor was released on VHS and LaserDisc on November 12, 1996. During its first week of release, the film ranked second on the sales chart behind Toy Story and fifth on the rentals chart behind the latter film, Eraser, Mission: Impossible, and Primal Fear. It had the fifth-highest rentals of 1996, ranking behind Braveheart, Seven, The Net, and Twister with $39 million in rentals revenue.

The film was released on Blu-ray on March 6, 2012.

== Reception ==
=== Box office ===
The Nutty Professor was a box-office success, making an opening weekend gross with $25,411,725. It topped the box office during its opening weekend, beating out Eraser, The Hunchback of Notre Dame, and Striptease. The film would hold the record for having the highest opening weekend for an Eddie Murphy film until it was taken by Dr. Dolittle in 1998. It reached a gross of $128,814,019 domestically, and $145,00,000 internationally, for a total of $273,814,019 worldwide.

=== Critical response ===
The Nutty Professor has received generally positive reviews from critics. Rotten Tomatoes gave the film a score of 65% based on reviews from 57 critics, with an average rating of 5.90/10. The site's consensus states: "The Nutty Professor falls back on juvenile humor eagerly and often, but Eddie Murphy's consistently funny work in dual roles means more for audiences to love." Metacritic gave the film a score of 62 out of 100, based on reviews from 20 critics, indicating "generally favorable reviews". Audiences surveyed by CinemaScore gave the film a grade A− on scale of A to F.

Roger Ebert of the Chicago Sun-Times gave the film 3 stars out of 4, calling it "a movie that's like a thumb to the nose for everyone who said [Murphy had] lost it. He's very good. And the movie succeeds in two different ways: it's sweet and good-hearted, and then again it's raucous slapstick and bathroom humor. I liked both parts." Owen Gleiberman of Entertainment Weekly gave the film a B+, writing "You can feel Murphy rediscovering his joy as a performer. He rediscovers it, too, as Sherman Klump, a fellow who, much like Murphy, is on the bottom rung, desperate to reinvent himself, and – at long last – does." Peter Travers of Rolling Stone gave the film a positive review, saying "Eddie Murphy is funny again. Sadly, he lacks the guts to follow through on the cathartic self-satire that gives the film its distinction." Travers praised the "amazing" fat makeup by Rick Baker, but criticized the "safe" fat jokes, and concluded "Only when Murphy stops skewering the compulsive overeater in his nutty professor and targets the sexist pig does the film hit home."

== Accolades ==
- 69th Academy Awards
  - Best Makeup (Won)
- 54th Golden Globe Awards
  - Best Actor in a Musical/Comedy - Eddie Murphy (Nominated; lost to Tom Cruise in Jerry Maguire)
- National Society of Film Critics Award for Best Actor (Eddie Murphy, winner)

== Sequel ==
A sequel, Nutty Professor II: The Klumps, was released on July 28, 2000.

== See also ==
- The Nutty Professor (film series)
