= The Nutty Professor (1963 film) =

1963 film by Jerry Lewis

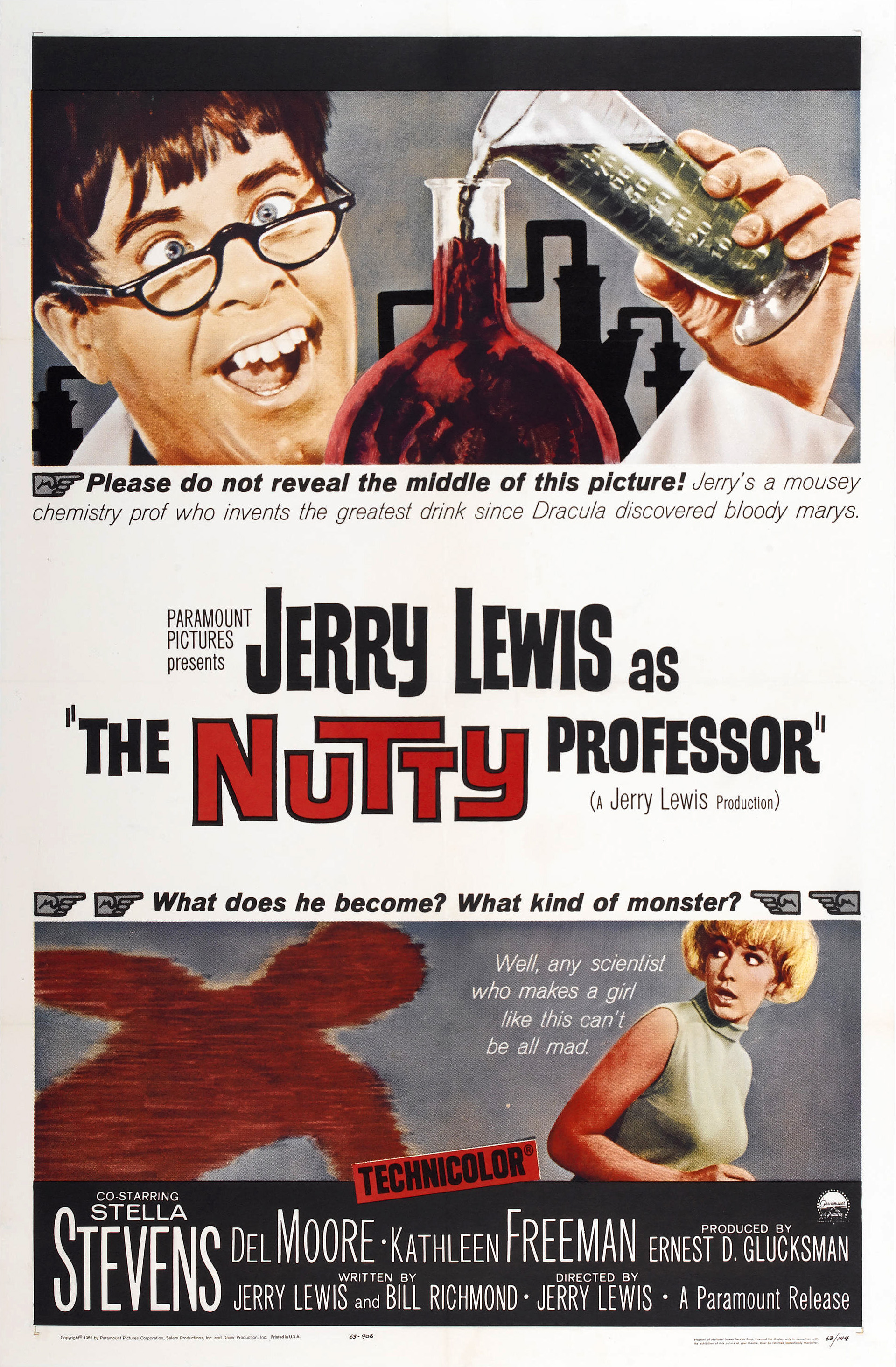
- Theatrical release poster
- Directed by: Jerry Lewis
- Written by: Jerry Lewis; Bill Richmond
- Produced by: Ernest D. Glucksman
- Starring: Jerry Lewis; Stella Stevens; Del Moore; Kathleen Freeman
- Cinematography: W. Wallace Kelley
- Edited by: John Woodcock
- Music by: Walter Scharf
- Production company: Jerry Lewis Films
- Distributed by: Paramount Pictures
- Release date: June 4, 1963
- Running time: 107 minutes
- Country: United States
- Language: English
- Box office: $19 million

The Nutty Professor is a 1963 American science fiction comedy film starring Jerry Lewis as the titular character. Lewis also directed the film, which he wrote with Bill Richmond. The film also co-stars Stella Stevens, Del Moore, Kathleen Freeman, Howard Morris, and Elvia Allman. The score was composed by Walter Scharf. A parody of Robert Louis Stevenson's 1886 novella Strange Case of Dr Jekyll and Mr Hyde, it follows weak-willed scientist Julius Kelp as he creates a serum that transforms him into a charismatic and narcissistic ladies' man named Buddy Love.

The Nutty Professor has been described as perhaps the finest and most memorable film of Lewis's career. In 2004, The Nutty Professor was selected for preservation in the United States National Film Registry by the Library of Congress as being "culturally, historically, or aesthetically significant".

A remake of The Nutty Professor was released in 1996, directed by Tom Shadyac and starring Eddie Murphy and Jada Pinkett-Smith. A sequel, Nutty Professor II: The Klumps, followed in 2000, and an animated sequel to the 1963 film was released in 2008. Lewis directed a musical theatre version in 2012. A new version of the musical, featuring the last score by Marvin Hamlisch, book and lyrics by Rupert Holmes and direction by Marc Bruni, was staged from July 1 to August 6, 2022, at the Ogunquit Playhouse in Ogunquit, Maine.

== Plot ==
Professor Julius Ferris Kelp is a neurotic, scruffy, buck-toothed, accident-prone, socially awkward university professor whose experiments in the classroom laboratory are unsuccessful and highly destructive. When a football-playing bully embarrasses and attacks him, Kelp decides to improve his physique by joining a local gym. Kelp's lack of physical strength leads him to seek a solution in his specialty of chemistry. He invents a serum that causes him to fall unconscious and have a nightmare about transforming into a traditional Dr. Jekyll and Mr. Hyde-esque monster. He then awakens as a suave and charming girl-chasing hipster who at his core is a brash and narcissistic sociopath.

Adopting the alias "Buddy Love", Kelp uses the self-confidence of his new personality to pursue one of his students, Stella Purdy. Although she resents Love, she finds herself strangely attracted to him. Buddy wows the crowd with his jazzy, breezy musical delivery and poised demeanor at the Purple Pit, a nightclub where the students hang out. He also mocks a bartender and waitress and punches a student. The formula starts to wear off at inopportune times, often to Kelp's humiliation. Although Kelp knows that his alternate persona is an inherently bad person, he cannot prevent himself from continually taking the formula as he enjoys the attention that Love receives. Fearing the cost of the formula becoming publicly available, he sends a copy to his equally weak-willed father Elmer and overbearing mother Edwina, hoping he can entrust them with his secret.

The students invite Love to perform at their annual dance, and despite skepticism from deadpan university president Dr. Mortimer Warfield, Love charms him into being allowed to perform. Partway through Kelp's performance as Love, the formula starts to wear off again. Rather than running out to take more of the formula, Kelp allows his real identity to be revealed as he gives an impassioned speech about the importance of liking one's self, admitting his mistakes and seeking forgiveness. Stella meets Kelp backstage and confesses that she prefers Kelp over Love, leading them to share a kiss.

Some time later, Elmer develops a confident personality of his own after taking the formula himself and decides to market it. He makes a pitch to the chemistry class, while Warfield endorses it, and the students all rush forward to buy the new tonic. In the commotion, Kelp, now wearing braces to correct his overbite, slips out of the class with Stella. Armed with a marriage license and two bottles of the formula, they elope.

During the short closing credits, each of the characters comes out and bows down to the camera. When Jerry Lewis, still portraying Kelp, comes out and bows, he trips and falls over the camera, shutting off the picture.

== Cast ==
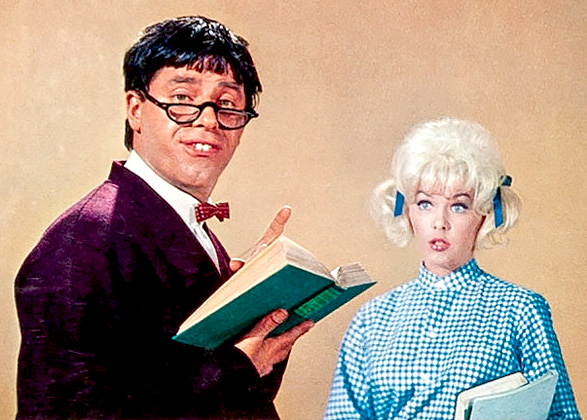
Jerry Lewis and Stella Stevens in The Nutty Professor

- Jerry Lewis as Professor Julius F. Kelp/Buddy Love
  - Lewis also voices Jennifer, Kelp's pet parakeet
- Stella Stevens as Stella Purdy
- Del Moore as Dr. Mortimer S. Warfield
- Kathleen Freeman as Millie Lemmon
- Howard Morris as Mr. Elmer Kelp
- Elvia Allman as Mrs. Edwina Kelp
- Norman Alden as football player #1/student #1
- Marvin Kaplan as English student
- Julie Parrish as college student #2
- Henry Gibson as college student #3
- Milton Frome as Dr. M. Sheppard Leevee
- Buddy Lester as bartender #1
- Med Flory as Warzewski, the football player
- George DeNormand as faculty member #3 (uncredited)
- Robert Donner as college student #6 (uncredited)
- Stuart Holmes as faculty member #5 (uncredited)
- Richard Kiel as Bodybuilder #1 (uncredited)
- Caryl Lincoln as faculty member #7 (uncredited)
- Mickey Manners as college student #11 (uncredited)
- Judi Thor as college student #13 (uncredited)
- Celeste Yarnall as college student #14 (uncredited)
- Francine York as college student #15 (uncredited)
- Billy Bletcher as plumber (uncredited)

=== Characters ===
The basic characterization of Julius Kelp was a Lewis staple, having appeared earlier in Rock-A-Bye Baby (1958), and basically identical characters would appear in The Family Jewels (1965), The Big Mouth (1967), and in various sketches on his self-titled variety show in the late 1960s.

Buddy Love is often interpreted as a lampoon of Lewis' show business partner Dean Martin; the duo were highly successful from 1946 to 1956 before an acrimonious breakup when they did not speak to each other for decades. Lewis, however, consistently denied this rumor. In his 1982 autobiography and again in a DVD featurette entitled The Nutty Professor: Making The Formula, Lewis stated that the character was based on every obnoxious, self-important, hateful hipster he ever knew. In the DVD commentary, Lewis speculates that he perhaps should have made Love more evil rather than simply obnoxious — since to his surprise more fan mail came for Love than for the professor. Film critic Danny Peary made the claim in his 1981 book Cult Movies that the character of Love is actually a representation of a dark side of Lewis's real personality. Lewis stated that the two represented good and evil.

The character of Professor Frink from the animated television series The Simpsons loosely borrows many of his mannerisms and technique from Lewis' delivery of the Julius Kelp character, as well as the transition to a Buddy Love version of Frink in several episodes. In the episode "Treehouse of Horror XIV", the character of Frink's father was voiced by Lewis.

== Production ==
The entire production was filmed from October 9 to December 17, 1962, mostly on the campus of Arizona State University in Tempe, Arizona and in the classroom and outside the school's library, numerous ASU logos can be seen on students' sweaters. The cast's costumes were designed by Edith Head.

Walter Scharf's score makes extensive use of the Victor Young jazz standard Stella by Starlight including an upbeat version over the film's main titles. Paramount was the copyright holder of the theme from its original appearance in The Uninvited (1944). Les Brown and his Band of Renown play themselves in the extended senior prom scenes.

Although not a musical, the film features several other standards, including "That Old Black Magic" and "I'm in the Mood for Love", sung by Lewis in the Buddy Love persona. Written for the film was another song for Love, "We've Got a World that Swings."

Love instructs the bartender to make an Alaskan Polar Bear Heater, "mix it nice" and pour it into a tall glass. The bartender asks if he can take a sip; after doing so, he freezes like a statue. While the drink started as fictional, it is now listed on some cocktail websites.

Product placement of RC Cola is noticeable throughout the film in the form of soda bottles, vending machines and even a delivery truck. Lewis was then under contract as a celebrity endorsement for the soft drink.

== Reception ==
On Rotten Tomatoes, the film holds an 80% rating based on 30 reviews, with an average rating of 6.7/10.

== Awards and honors ==
In 2000, the American Film Institute placed the film on its 100 Years...100 Laughs list, where it was ranked No. 99.

The National Film Preservation Board, USA included it among the 25 films inducted into the Library of Congress in 2004 for the National Film Registry.

== Home media ==
The Nutty Professor was released on DVD in October 2000. In October 2004, a "Special Edition" was released including an audio commentary by Lewis and Steve Lawrence, a documentary and a short feature. In the commentary, Lewis discusses aspects of production, including his creating a real-time, on-camera monitor, which subsequently became standard in the film industry, known as video assist. He mentions that he recut the film for his own home viewing. He also identifies scenes that he would have liked to redo; for example, making the professor's watch sound tinny.

The DVD of the film contains a long deleted scene in which Kelp's love interest is portrayed as a sultry siren whose choreographed, jaw-dropping entrance to the Purple Pit, accompanied by jazz music, contrasts with the final edit in which she is portrayed as smart but fairly unassuming.

The Nutty Professor received a "50th anniversary" Blu-ray release in June 2014 as an "Ultimate Collector's Edition" set. This release included all the bonus features from the previous DVD release, a new documentary short, Jerry Lewis: No Apologies, and two additional Jerry Lewis films on DVD. A disc-only release followed in September 2014.

== Remake ==
Lewis had for decades talked about doing a sequel and eventually settled for the 1996 remake starring Eddie Murphy, for which Lewis was credited as an executive producer. The 1996 version did produce a sequel of its own, Nutty Professor II: The Klumps.

== Animated sequel ==
An animated direct-to-DVD sequel, also titled The Nutty Professor, featured the voices of Lewis and Drake Bell and was released on November 25, 2008. Directed by Paul Taylor, the film involves Julius Kelp's teenage grandson Harold discovering his grandfather's secret formula and unleashing his own alter ego.

== Musical adaptation ==
In 2006, Lewis was approached by Michael Andrew and Ned McLeod, of the Michael Andrew Company and Loud Watch Productions - about the idea of producing a musical adaptation of The Nutty Professor. After seeing Andrew perform, Lewis green-lit the production and began the search for a creative team and investors.

A musical comedy adaptation originally opened at the Nashville Tennessee Performing Arts Center from July to August 2012. Lewis directed the musical, with choreography by Joann M. Hunter. The musical has a book and lyrics written by Rupert Holmes and music composed by Marvin Hamlisch, with scenery by David Gallo and costumes by Ann Hould-Ward. Michael Andrew was cast in the lead role as Professor Julius Kelp. The plot closely follows the original film. The production received warm reviews for its choreography, songs, cast, set, and story.

In 2022, a smaller production under the direction of Marc Bruni (director of the Tony-winning Broadway hit Beautiful: The Carole King Musical). The production starred Dan De Luca as the lead role as Professor Julius Kelp. Original producer and star Micheal Andrew was not attached to the project. In an interview with BroadwayWorld.com promoting the 2022 production, book writer Rupert Holmes credited "someone" as approaching Jerry Lewis with the idea of creating a musical adaptation of The Nutty Professor.

== See also ==
- List of American films of 1963
- The Nutty Professor (film series)
