= The Nutty Professor (2008 film) =

The Nutty Professor: Facing the Fear
- Official release cover artwork
- Directed by: Logan McPherson; Paul Taylor
- Written by: Evan Spiliotopoulos
- Produced by: George Paige; Barbara Zelinski
- Starring: Jerry Lewis; Drake Bell; Andrew Francis; Britt Irvin
- Edited by: James Boshier; Logan McPherson
- Music by: Mike Shields
- Production companies: Kaleidoscope TWC; Mainframe Entertainment Inc. The Weinstein Company
- Distributed by: Genius Products
- Release date: November 25, 2008
- Running time: 75 minutes
- Countries: United States; Canada
- Language: English

The Nutty Professor (fully titled as The Nutty Professor 2: Facing the Fear) is a 2008 animated science fiction comedy film. It is the sequel to the 1963 live-action Jerry Lewis comedy of the same name and based on the story Strange Case of Dr Jekyll and Mr Hyde by Robert Louis Stevenson. The film is produced by Rainmaker Entertainment and The Weinstein Company and distributed by Genius Products. Lewis reprises his role of Julius Kelp and produces the film. Drake Bell provides the voice of Harold Kelp, Julius' grandson.

The film was released direct-to-video on November 25, 2008.

== Plot ==
Harold Kelp, a young inventor, is frequently attacked in his visions by his fear, which takes the form of a group of burly dodgeball players as well as a black monster. After encountering an angry mob involved in his bad inventions, Harold is informed by his robot assistant, Robin that he will be sent away to a science academy where his grandfather, Julius Kelp has taken up a duty as Professor.

Upon his arrival, Harold is welcomed by his grandfather, befriends a duo of misfits, Zeke and Ned who welcomes him into their dorm, has a run in with a bully named Brad and meets a beautiful girl named Polly McGregor whom he becomes enamored with. Harold's first tasked assignment as a student is inventing a custom motorbike where it will be used in a race against other students. Around the same time, Julius retrieves a message from Dean Van Wu that his grant renewal is the same day as the race, prompting the professor to ask the favor of borrowing the in-progress cold-fusion engine from his grandson's motorbike after the race to upgrade his Kelpotronic, an all-terrain vehicle that creates its own terrain to climb walls, which Harold agrees to in exchange for extra credit. Harold works hard on his project, but is held back by his crush on Polly and his fear. That night, Harold stumbles upon the Secrets of Love, the elixir formula that brought out his grandfather's more confident self. Hoping his new personality will win over Polly's affection, Harold overrides Robin to grant him access to the formulas data and creates an elixir. He drinks it, unleashing his cooler, hipper alter ego Jack.

Jack starts out successfully impressing Polly, but because of him, Harold is now missing classes. Jack's behavior soon gets out of hand when he goes on a date with Polly at the Pit, and joins Brad and Tad in picking on Harold's friend Zeke, which results in a fight between the three latter students in class the next day. Polly converses with Harold saying that her date with Jack went horrible and she'd never date anyone who acts like him. After Polly takes Harold out on a motorbike ride, Harold finds out that Polly is starting to like him, and declares he might not need Jack anymore. Jack himself then pops out of a mirror and drags Harold into his mind where he declares he wants to be freed from his subconscious, and reminds him that he needs him for the upcoming race.

The next day, Julius unveils the Cellular Reconstruction Uplink Device (C.R.U.D) which allows the user to manifest objects and desires from their mind into the real world. Harold asks Polly out to date in which she accepts. During the date, Jack witnesses Harold's goofy behavior and pleads to be tagged in so he can help him and avoid his fear, but Harold resists. The next day, Julius tells Harold that he has missed his deadline and that his grant is at stake. Harold, feeling sad, tells Julius that he doesn't know what he's going through. Julius then transforms into Buddy Love to reminds Harold that all he needs is to be himself.

On the day of the race, Harold reluctantly drinks the Secret of Love elixir as Jack causes further mayhem on the track, winning the race, but scaring Harold in the process. Harold fights Jack as the two entities take turns hitting each other through transformations. During which, Polly sees Jack for the first time and breaks up with Harold due to his dishonesty. Saddened and angered by losing Polly, Harold jumps into a mirror to attack Jack again, but gets trapped in his subconscious as Jack finally escapes.

Controlling Harold's body, Jack makes his way to the Lab where he creates a formula that will permanently make him Harold's main personality. Seeing what Jack is doing, Julius transforms into Buddy Love and battles him. Jack then grabs the C.R.U.D device and activates it, releasing Harold and accidentally bringing his fear monster into the real world. The fear monster wreaks havoc as it eats Julius. Using the Kelpatronic, Harold conducts a plan with Polly, Zeke, Ned, and the other students to lead the fear monster into a room where it can be destroyed. Inches from the room, the Kelpatronic breaks down and the fear eats it, leaving only Harold left. He manages to defeat his fear by admitting to his own fears which causes it to grow progressively smaller and upchuck all of Harold's friends and family one by one. Dean Wu, who got involved in the whole mess, claimed shortly afterwards that the madness actually thrilled him enough to restore Julius' grant, seeing the nutty professor still had a lot of work to do, and Julius hugs the Dean in gratitude. With the day saved, the formula that Jack took earlier begins to wear off and make him fade away. Jack bids his goodbye as he feels proud of Harold not needing him anymore. He evaporates and disappears into Harold, leaving him to share a kiss with Polly.

== Voice cast ==
- Drake Bell as Harold Kelp/Jack
- Jerry Lewis as Prof. Julius Kelp/Buddy Love
- Tabitha St. Germain as Robin
- Britt Irvin as Polly McGregor
- Logan McPherson as Zeke/Waiter/Fear/Ned
- Andrew Francis as Brad/Tad
- Brian Drummond as Dean Von Wu
- Danielle Lewis as Suzy Perkins

== Production ==
On August 8, 2006, Mainframe Entertainment announced The Weinstein Company acquired the rights to produce an animated version of The Nutty Professor, which was distributed direct-to-video by Genius Products Inc. The film was produced under the working title The Nutty Professor 2: Facing the Fear.

There are several homages to the original film, including the place where Zeke and Ned perform, called "The Pit." In the original film, the nightclub is called "The Purple Pit". While under his Buddy Love alias, Julius compares Harold's School life to a 63 Cutlass Supreme, the 63 is a reference to the year 1963 in which the original film was released. The cast includes Danielle Lewis, the daughter of Jerry Lewis, who cameos as the voice of Harold's neighbor, Suzy Perkins.

== Reception ==
The film has received mixed reviews. Common Sense Media gave it a rating of 2/5, saying:

"Parents need to know that The Nutty Professor -- also called The Nutty Professor 2: Facing the Fear -- doesn't have much to do with the Jerry Lewis classic, even though Lewis does provide the voice of Harold's grandfather. There's lots of bullying, and Harold becomes addicted to the chemical formula he develops. The film is less about facing fear than being overwhelmed by terrifying situations -- stick to the original if you're looking for a good movie for kids."
