= Michael Chabon bibliography =

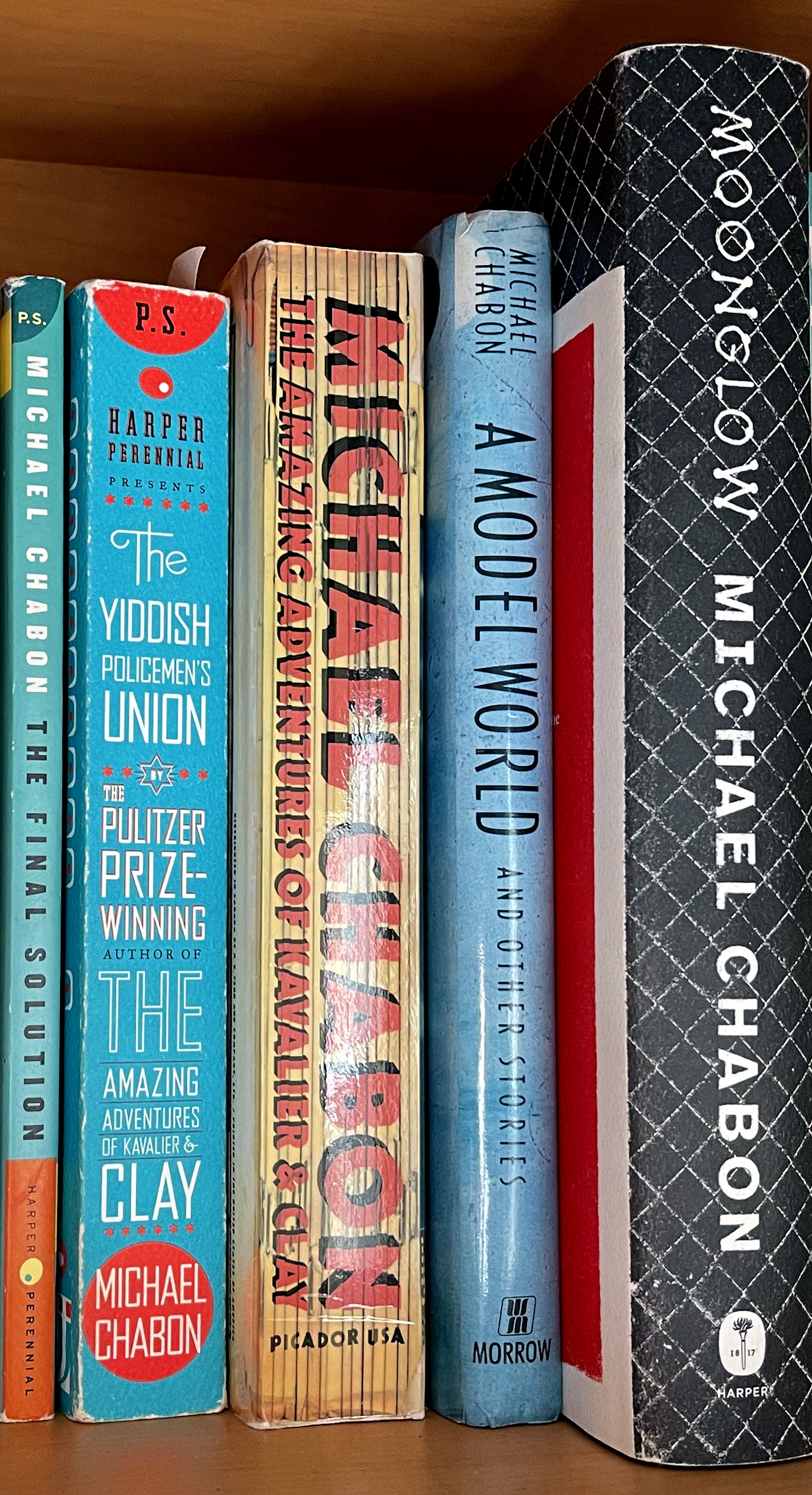
Several Chabon's books

This is a list of works by American author Michael Chabon.

== Novels ==
- The Mysteries of Pittsburgh (1988)
- Wonder Boys (1995)
- The Amazing Adventures of Kavalier & Clay (2000)
- Summerland (2002)
- The Final Solution (2004)
- The Yiddish Policemen's Union (2007)
- Gentlemen of the Road (2007)
- Telegraph Avenue (2012)
- Moonglow (2016)

== Short fiction ==
Collections

- A Model World and Other Stories (1991)
- Werewolves in Their Youth (1999)

Stories

- "The God of Dark Laughter" (The New Yorker 77/7; April 9, 2001)
- "Along the Frontage Row" (The New Yorker 77/36; November 19, 2001)
- "The Martian Agent, a Planetary Romance" (McSweeney's 10; February 1, 2003)
- "Citizen Conn" (The New Yorker 88/1; February 13&20, 2012)
- "The Sandmeyer Reaction" (The New York Times; November 18, 2016)

== Children's books ==
- The Astonishing Secret of Awesome Man (illustrator: Jake Parker) (2011)

== Comics ==
- Julius Knipl, Real Estate Photographer: Stories by Ben Katchor (Introduction) (1996)
- JSA All Stars #7, "The Strange Case of Mr. Terrific and Doctor Nil" (writer) (2004)
- Michael Chabon Presents: The Amazing Adventures of the Escapist (comic book series published by Dark Horse Comics) (Numbers 1–8; the first six are also collected in three books, two numbers per volume) (2004–2005)
- The Escapists (six-issue comic book limited series published by Dark Horse Comics) (2006)
- Casanova: Acedia (Backup story with Matt Fraction) (illustrator: Gabriel Bá) (2015)

== Nonfiction ==
- "Guidebook to a Land of Ghosts". Civilization: The Magazine of the Library of Congress. June–July 1997.
- Casting the Runes and Other Ghost Stories by M. R. James (Introduction) (2002)
- Maps and Legends (2008)
- Manhood for Amateurs (2009)
- Pops: Fatherhood in Pieces (2018)
- Bookends: Collected Intros and Outros (2019)
- "The final frontier : 'Star Trek' guides a hospital vigil". Personal History. The New Yorker. 95 (36): 24–28. November 18, 2019.

== As editor ==
- McSweeney's Mammoth Treasury of Thrilling Tales (editor and contributor) (2003)
- McSweeney's Enchanted Chamber of Astonishing Stories (editor) (2004)
- The Best American Short Stories 2005 (editor, with Katrina Kenison) (2005)
