= Werewolves in Their Youth =

1999 short story collection by Michael Chabon

- First edition cover
- Author: Michael Chabon
- Cover artist: Art director: Andy Carpenter; Jacket design: Kapo Ng
- Language: English
- Publisher: Random House
- Publication date: 1999
- Publication place: United States
- Media type: Print (hardback & paperback)
- Pages: 212 pp (first edition, hardback)
- ISBN: 0-679-41587-4 (first edition, hardback)
- OCLC: 39060578
- Dewey Decimal: 813/.54 21
- LC Class: PS3553.H15 W4 1999

Werewolves in Their Youth is a 1999 short story collection by American author Michael Chabon.

== Contents ==
- "Werewolves in Their Youth"
- "House Hunting"
- "Son of the Wolfman"
- "Green's Book"
- "Mrs. Box"
- "Spikes"
- "The Harris Fetko Story"
- "That Was Me"
- "In the Black Mill"

== Collection ==
With the exception of the concluding story, all involve failed or failing marriages. The final story, "In the Black Mill" is introduced as the work of August Van Zorn, a fictional writer from Chabon's Wonder Boys. It is a throwback to pulp horror stories of the pre-World War II era.

== Reception ==
Werewolves in Their Youth received mixed reviews from critics. In a starred review, Publishers Weekly referred to Chabon's "ironic talents", further writing, "Chabon is as witty as ever while dispensing with the glibness that sometimes marred his earlier work. His characters, even whey they are silly and flawed, come across as sympathetic, three-dimensional human beings." Kirkus Reviews called the collection "pretty thin gruel", while stating, "Chabon is a stylist [...] whose finely crafted sentences unfortunately don—t add up to very interesting narratives."
