= New China Building =

Building in Guangzhou, China

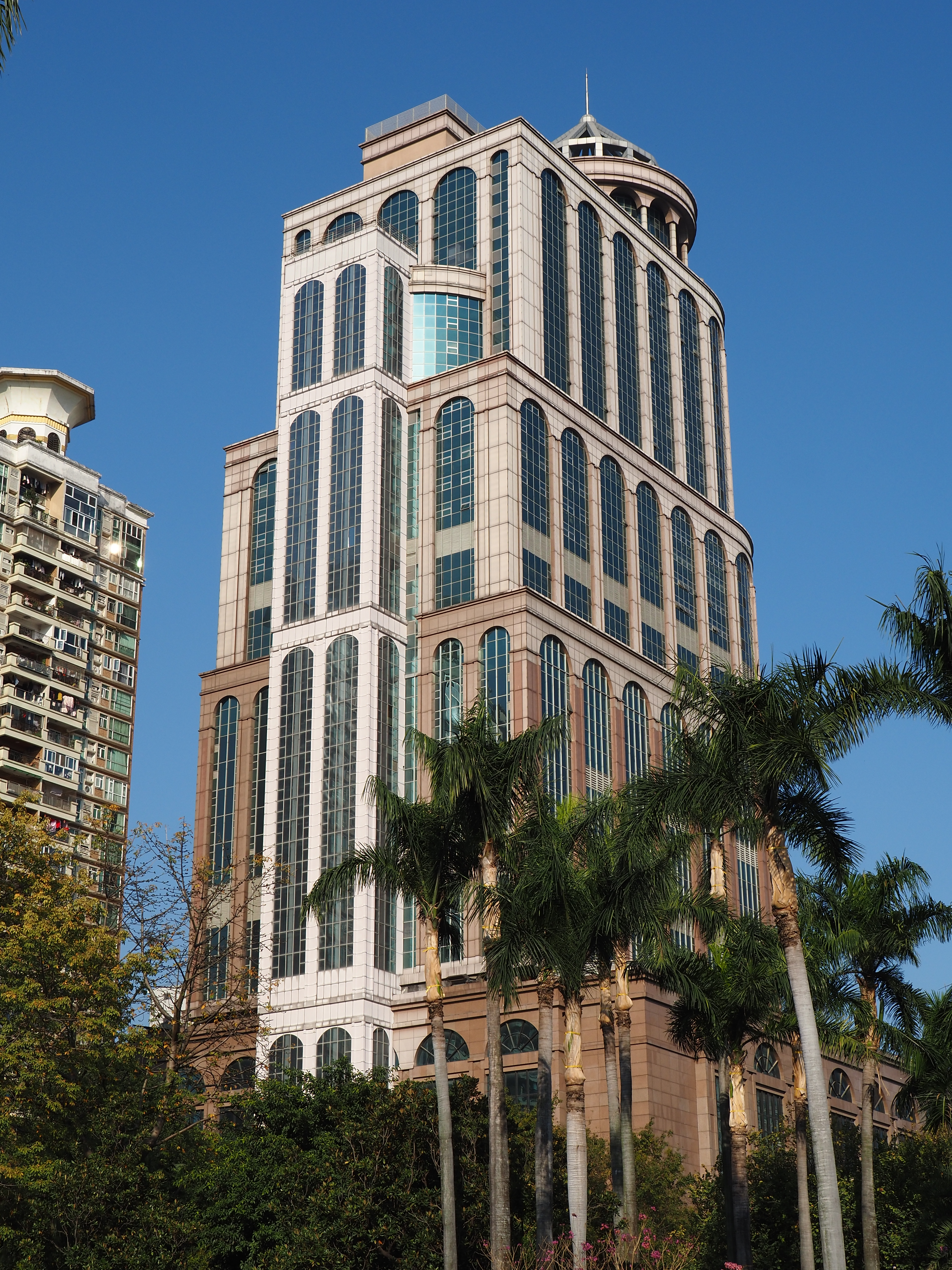
The New China Building

The New China Building is located at the intersection of People's South Road and Thirteen Row Road in Lingnan Street, Liwan District, Guangzhou. It is adjacent to the Upper and Lower Nine Pedestrian Streetsto the north, the Pearl River to the south, and Guangzhou Cultural Park to the west. It is one of the well-known clothing wholesale markets in mainland China.

The apartment building of the New China Tower is located at No. 1 Thirteen Row Road, occupying a total area of 9,401 square meters and standing 162 meters tall. The total floor area reaches 150,000 square meters. The building stands 48 stories tall, with 43 floors above ground and 5 floors below ground: initially planned as a super-large parking lot with over 500 spaces, some areas were privately renovated into shops and warehouses during this period. The second to third floors are planned for rental as stalls; the fourth to twentieth floors are planned for high-end office spaces, but some floors have been privately converted into shops by management companies; there are a total of over 4,000 shops. The entire market primarily focuses on women's clothing wholesale, with some also offering items such as accessories and shoes and hats.

== History ==
- In 1996, Guangzhou Friendship Storeentrusted Guangzhou Guoshang Building Development Co., Ltd., whose legal representative was Pan Weixi, to invest in and develop the site where the building now stands. Initially, the project was named “Guangzhou Commercial Empire Building,” in imitation of New York’s Empire State Building, but due to widespread public criticism, the name was later changed to its current one. The approved development plan at the time included commercial space, apartments, and a hotel. At one point, the developer raised up to HKD 700 million by promising high returns, setting a record for single-building fundraising in Guangzhou that year.
- On December 20, 1998, the building was preliminarily completed, and the Guangzhou Friendship StoreNew China Tower branch began trial operations. At the time, it was the first owned property for Guangzhou Friendship's external expansion. According to reports at the time, several former high-ranking officials, including the former Vice Chairman of the National People's Congress, the former Deputy Chief of Staff of the People's Liberation Army, and the former Secretary-General of the State Council, attended the celebration as guests. By Pan Weixi's opening remarks. The building was once a landmark in the area around Guangzhou's Thirteen Rows.
- In 1999, Pan Weixi fled Hong Kong after being involved in the "billion-dollar illegal deposit case" at Guangzhou Commercial Bank. The CPC Guangzhou Municipal Committeeand GovernmentGovernment formed a task force to take over the building, which resulted in the building becoming an unfinished building due to a broken capital chain .resulting in significant losses for over 600 small owners and subsequent conflicts of interest.
- In the second half of 2000, the Guangzhou Friendship Store Board of Directors decided to enter into a contract with Guangzhou Da Wenhao Development Co., Ltd. to lease the first to third floors of the New China Tower for clothing wholesale use, with a five-year lease from September 16, 2000, to September 15, 2005.
- On February 6, 2002, in an effort to minimize losses from a failed investment, Guangzhou Friendship Store passed a resolution at a shareholders’ meeting to 《terminate the use of raised funds for the new China Friendship Branch project》: “The trial operation of the Guangzhou Friendship Branch in the building will be suspended and the premises will be converted into a commercial wholesale property for lease.” Subsequently, the building gradually developed into a leading garment wholesale market in Guangzhou. However, the unauthorized change of its original purpose led to fire safety hazards, which, despite rectification efforts, remained inadequately addressed. During this period, the building was managed by Zhongyi Company, which had close ties to Pan Weixi.
- On August 25, 2009, the building underwent its first public auction, with a starting bid of 1.137 billion RMB, but it ultimately ended in a liquidation.
- In 2010, after three failed auctions, Guangdong Jinsuifeng Industrial Co., Ltd. acquired the entire building project at the reserve price of 974 million yuan. However, the property owned by the Friendship Company was not included in the auction scope. That same year, Jinsuifeng requested Zhongyi Company to vacate the premises. After the request was refused, the two parties were involved in multiple intense conflicts.
- In 2011, the Liwan District Court ruled that Zhongyi Company should evacuate the building. On April 15 of the same year, a street fight broke out between the two companies, injuring more than 40 people and resulting in 16 being sentenced.
- In 2013, Pan Weixi was arrested in Hong Kong, and at the time, Xie Guotao, the Party Work Committee Secretary of Lingnan Street Office, was also investigated by judicial authorities regarding matters related to the New China Tower.
- Starting on March 20, 2014, the Liwan Branch of the Guangzhou Public Security Bureau mobilized over a thousand police officers to carry out the largest fire safety rectification since the building's construction. The operation lasted for six months. During this period, some business owners who had been ordered to suspend operations were placed under administrative detention for tearing off official police seals without authorization. Others criticized the enforcement methods as overly harsh and simplistic, claiming that they affected their livelihoods. There was also public suspicion that the Liwan District Government was using fire safety rectification as a pretext to force the garment market and all its tenants to relocate.

== Public Transportation ==
- Guangzhou Metro Line 6 and Guangzhou Metro Line 8 Cultural Park Station
- Bus: People's South Road Station. Passing routes: 4, Night 7, Night 16, Night 26, Night 31, 31, 31, 31, 31, 38, 61, 102, 103, 106, 110, 128, 134, 186, 209, 217, 556

== Nearby Buildings ==
- Guangzhou Cultural Park
- Southern Tower
- Oi Kwan Hotel

== Related Entries ==
- Unfinished buildings
- Guangzhou Friendship Store
