= Manhood for Amateurs =

Book by Michael Chabon

- Author: Michael Chabon
- Publisher: HarperCollins
- Publication date: October 6, 2009
- ISBN: 9780061490187

Manhood For Amateurs: The Pleasures and Regrets of a Husband, Father, and Son is a 2009 collection of essays by the American writer Michael Chabon.

== Collection ==
The complete title of Chabon's collection is Manhood for Amateurs: The Pleasures and Regrets of a Husband, Father, and Son. As the writer explains, the work discusses "being a man in all its complexity — a son, a father, a husband." The collection was nominated for a 2010 Northern California Book Award in the Creative Nonfiction category. This was Chabon's second published collection of essays and non-fiction. McSweeney's published Maps and Legends, a collection of Chabon's literary essays, on May 1, 2008.

== Essays ==
Most of the essays previously appeared in GQ, The New York Times, and others.

== Contents ==
- The Losers' Club
- William and I
- The Cut
- D.A.R.E.
- The Memory Hole
- The Binding of Isaac
- To the Legoland Station
- The Wilderness of Childhood
- Hypocritical Theory
- The Splendors of Crap
- The Hand on My Shoulder
- The Story of Our Story
- The Ghost of Irene Adler
- The Heartbreak Kid
- A Gift
- Faking It
- Art of Cake
- On Canseco
- I Feel Good About My Murse
- Burning Women
- Verging
- Fever
- Looking for Trouble
- A Woman of Valor
- Like, Cosmic
- Subterranean
- X09
- Sky and Telescope
- Surefire Lines
- Cosmodemonic
- Boyland
- A Textbook Father
- The Omega Glory
- Getting Out
- Radio Silence
- Normal Time
- Xmas
- The Amateur Family
- Daughter of the Commandment
