= Chuck Kinder =

American novelist (1946–2019)

- Born: Charles Alfonso Kinder II; October 8, 1946; Montgomery, West Virginia, U.S.
- Died: May 3, 2019 (aged 72); Key Largo, Florida, U.S.
- Education: West Virginia University (BA, MA); Stanford University
- Occupation: Novelist
- Spouse: Diane Cecily Blackmer
- Parent(s): Charles Alfonso Kinder; Eileen Reba Parsons

Charles Alfonso Kinder II (October 8, 1946 – May 3, 2019) was an American novelist.

== Biography ==
Kinder was born October 8 in Montgomery, West Virginia to Charles Alfonso and Eileen Reba (Parsons) Kinder. He was educated at West Virginia University (BA, MA) and Stanford University (Stegner Fellowship). After teaching at Stanford and Waynesburg College, Kinder was a professor of English at the University of Pittsburgh, where he taught from 1980 until his retirement in 2014.

At Stanford, Kinder became close friends with fellow students Raymond Carver and Scott Turow, and Stegner alumnus Larry McMurtry. His relationship with Carver inspired his 2001 novel Honeymooners: A Cautionary Tale, which for nearly twenty years had vexed Kinder and had grown, uncontrollably, into a sprawling manuscript of over 3,000 pages. Kinder's struggle with this manuscript was local legend at the University of Pittsburgh. Michael Chabon, once an undergraduate student of Kinder's, used it as inspiration for the character Grady Tripp in the 1995 novel Wonder Boys.

Kinder was married to Diane Cecily Blackmer. He died May 4, 2019, in Key Largo, Florida.

== Novels ==
- Snakehunter (New York: Alfred A. Knopf, 1973)
- The Silver Ghost (New York: Harcourt Brace, 1979)
- Honeymooners: A Cautionary Tale (New York: Farrar, Straus & Giroux, 2001)

== Creative Nonfiction ==
- Last Mountain Dancer: Hard-Earned Lessons in Love, Loss, and Honky-Tonk Outlaw Life, (New York: Carroll & Graf, 2004)

== Poetry ==
- Giant Night: The Secret Science of Angels and Aliens : The Poem as Memoir, Funerary Text, with Kitchen Sink (Pittsburgh: self-published, 2013)
- Imagination Hotel (Pittsburgh: Six Gallery Press, 2014)
- All That Yellow (Pittsburgh: Low Ghost Press, 2014)
- Hot Jewels (Pittsburgh: Six Gallery Press, 2017)

== Sources ==
Contemporary Authors Online. The Gale Group, 2003. PEN (Permanent Entry Number): 0000150152.
