= The Yiddish Policemen's Union =

Novel by Michael Chabon

- First edition cover
- Author: Michael Chabon
- Cover artist: Jacket design by Will Staehle
- Language: English, some Yiddish
- Genre: Science fiction, alternative history, detective fiction
- Publisher: HarperCollins
- Publication date: May 1, 2007
- Publication place: United States
- Media type: Print (hardcover)
- Pages: 414 (first edition, hardcover)
- Awards: Hugo Award for Best Novel (2008), Nebula Award for Best Novel (2008), Sidewise Award for Alternate History (2007)
- ISBN: 978-0-00-714982-7 (first edition, hardcover)
- OCLC: 73140283
- Dewey Decimal: 813/.54 22
- LC Class: PS3553.H15 Y54 2007

The Yiddish Policemen's Union is a 2007 novel by American author Michael Chabon. The novel is a detective story set in an alternate present, based on the premise that during World War II, a temporary settlement for Jewish refugees was established in Sitka, Alaska, in 1941, and that the fledgling State of Israel was destroyed three months after its founding in 1948. The novel is set in Sitka, which it depicts as a large, Yiddish-speaking metropolis.

The Yiddish Policemen's Union won a number of science fiction awards: the Nebula Award for Best Novel, the Locus Award for Best SF Novel, the Hugo Award for Best Novel, and the Sidewise Award for Alternate History for Best Novel. It was shortlisted for the British Science Fiction Association Award for Best Novel and the Edgar Allan Poe Award for Best Novel.

== Setting ==
The Yiddish Policemen's Union is set in an alternative history version of the present day. The premise is that, contrary to real history, the United States voted to implement the 1940 Slattery Report, which recommended the provision of land in Alaska for the temporary refugee settlement of European Jews who were being persecuted by the Nazis during World War II (see also Jews escaping from German-occupied Europe). The novel's divergence point from real history is revealed in the first dozen chapters to be the death of Anthony Dimond, Alaska Territory delegate to the U.S. Congress, in a car crash; Dimond was the politician most responsible for preventing a vote on the report. It imagines a temporary independent Jewish settlement being created on the Alaskan coast. As a result, two million Jews are murdered in the Holocaust, instead of six million (as in the real world).

The setting is Sitka, Alaska, which has become a sprawling metropolis at the center of the Jewish settlement in Alaska. One of the city's landmarks is the 'Safety Pin', a tall building erected for the 1977 World Fair held in Sitka and a source of pride for its inhabitants. The lands across the border are populated primarily by Tlingit Alaska Natives, and there has been a history of friction between the Jews and the Tlingit, but also of intermarriage and cross-cultural contact; one of the novel's characters, Berko Shemets, is half Jewish, half Tlingit. Sitka's status as a Federal District (U.S. territory) has been granted for only sixty years, and the novel is set at the end of this period. The President of the United States is an evangelical Christian and Christian Zionist who is promising to go through with the "Reversion" of Sitka to the State of Alaska.

In the novel, the State of Israel is founded in 1948, but is destroyed after only three months in an alternative version of the Arab-Israeli War. Without Israel, Palestine is described as a mosaic of contending religious and secular nationalist groups locked in internecine conflict; Jerusalem is described as "a city of blood and slogans painted on the wall, severed heads on telephone poles". The United States president believes in "divine sanction" for neo-Zionism, a movement seeking for Jews to reclaim Israel once again.

Chabon describes the rest of world history only elliptically, but hints at enormous changes. Germany crushes the Soviet Union in 1942 and World War II continues until 1946, when Berlin is destroyed with nuclear weapons. Chabon refers to a 'Polish Free State' existing in 1950 and describes some characters as veterans of a lengthy 'Cuban War' in the 1960s. President John F. Kennedy was not assassinated and married Marilyn Monroe, and Orson Welles succeeded in making his film of Heart of Darkness. Describing the modern world, Chabon refers to a 'Third Russian Republic' and an independent Manchuria that is led by a prime minister and has its own space program.

== Plot summary ==
The book opens with Meyer Landsman, an alcoholic homicide detective with the Sitka police department, investigating the murder of a man in the hotel where Landsman lives. Beside the corpse lies an open cardboard chess board with an unfinished game set up on it. Landsman calls his partner and cousin, half-Tlingit, half-Jewish Berko Shemets, to help him investigate further. Upon filing a report on the murder at police headquarters, Landsman and Berko discover that Landsman's ex-wife Bina Gelbfish has been promoted to commanding officer of their unit. Landsman's only other living family member is Berko's father Hertz, a war veteran and former federal agent who performed missions on behalf of the United States government before they burned him. Landsman's chess-addicted father and cancer-stricken mother died before the events of the novel, as did his sister Naomi, a bush pilot who lost her life in a plane crash. Sitka is due to be "reverted" to the control of the state of Alaska in just a few weeks' time, leaving the status of Sitka, previously a semi-autonomous federal district governed by the Jews, in question. Berko has made plans for his family to stay legally, but Landsman has not.

After consulting with Hertz and visiting several local chess clubs, who knew the victim as "Frank", Landsman and Berko discover that the victim was Mendel Shpilman, the son of the Verbover rebbe, Sitka’s most powerful organized crime boss. Many Jews believed Mendel to be the Tzadik ha-Dor, the potential messiah, born once in every generation. Mendel was addicted to heroin and both of his parents abandoned him; despite this, the family decides to throw a public funeral with the help of the Verbover lawyer, Aryeh Baronshteyn.

As Meyer continues to investigate Mendel's murder, he discovers that the supposed "chosen one" had taken a flight with Naomi. He follows Naomi's trail to a mysterious set of buildings with an unknown purpose, set up in Tlingit territory by Jews. Landsman flies there to investigate; he is knocked out and thrown in a cell, whose walls have graffiti in Naomi's handwriting. Landsman is soon woken up by Baronshteyn and a doctor who claims that they are in a legitimate rehabilitation center. Landsman attacks his captor and is able to escape.

The near naked and injured Landsman is soon rescued by a local Tlingit police chief, Willie Dick, who reunites him with Berko. The duo visit Hertz, where Hertz and Berko have a confrontation over Hertz's role in a race riot that led to the death of Berko's mother. Hertz attempts suicide by shooting himself in the head and is rushed to the hospital. Back in Sitka, they learn that the mysterious complex is operated by a paramilitary group who wants to build a new Temple in Jerusalem after destroying the Dome of the Rock, hoping to speed the birth of the Messiah. An evangelical Christian Zionist American government supports the group.

As Landsman and Berko investigate, the News reports the Dome being bombed. American agents apprehend the detectives and offer them permission to stay in Sitka, if they agree to keep quiet about the plot they have uncovered. Landsman says that he will and is released. Landsman reunites with Bina, frustrated by his failure with the Shpilman case. Remembering the chess board, he suddenly realizes that it's not an unfinished game, but a chess problem: he had seen the same problem from the perspective of the other player in Hertz's house. Landsman and Bina visit a recovering Hertz at Berko's home, and he confesses to killing Mendel at Mendel's own request hoping to ruin the government's plans to bring upon the Messiah. Landsman contacts American journalist Brennan stating that he "has a story for him". The reader is left wondering if Landsman is planning to expose Hertz's involvement in Shpilman's murder or the complex messianic conspiracy.

== Origins and writing ==
Chabon began working on the novel in February 2002, inspired by an essay he had published in Harper's in October 1997. Entitled "Guidebook to a Land of Ghosts", the essay discussed a travel book Chabon had found, Say It in Yiddish, and the dearth of Yiddish-speaking countries in which the book would be useful. While researching hypothetical Yiddish-speaking countries, Chabon learned of "this proposal once that Jewish refugees be allowed to settle in Alaska during World War II... I made a passing reference to it in the essay, but the idea stuck." Vitriolic public response to the essay, which was seen as controversial for "prematurely announcing [Yiddish's] demise," also spurred Chabon to develop the idea.

In late 2003, Chabon mentioned the novel on his web site, saying that it was titled Hatzeplatz in a reference to the "Yiddish expression 'from here to Hatzeplatz,' meaning more or less the back of nowhere, Podunk, Iowa, the ends of the earth." In 2004, Chabon said the (retitled) book would be published in fall 2005, but then the writer decided to trash his most recent draft and start over. His publisher HarperCollins pushed the publication date back to April 11, 2006. Chabon's rejected 600-page draft featured the same characters as the novel he eventually published but "a completely different story," and was also written in the first person.

In December 2005, Chabon announced a second delay to the novel's release, claiming that the manuscript was complete but that he felt that HarperCollins was rushing the novel into publication. An excerpt from the book appeared in the Fall 2006 issue of the Virginia Quarterly Review, and the novel itself was released on May 1, 2007. Chabon has said that the novel was difficult to write, calling it "an exercise in restraint all around... The sentences are much shorter than my typical sentences; my paragraphs are shorter than my typical paragraphs." He also described the novel as an homage to the writing of mystery writers Raymond Chandler, Dashiell Hammett, and Ross Macdonald, along with Russian writer Isaac Babel.

The book's original cover art by Will Staehle features an amalgam of styles (like the novel itself), drawing on classic pulp detective novel, Jewish imagery, and art from the Pacific Northwest and Alaska, especially that of the Tlingit and Haida peoples.

== Reception ==
In the weeks leading up to its publication, the novel received considerable attention from the press. The front page of The New York Times' Arts & Leisure section featured a "big, splashy" profile of Chabon in which he flew to Sitka and discussed the book while walking around the city.

Reviews were generally positive. The review aggregator Metacritic reported the book had an average score of 75 out of 100, based on 17 reviews. Library Journal called it "bloody brilliant" and Michiko Kakutani wrote in The New York Times that the novel "builds upon the achievement of Kavalier & Clay... a gripping murder mystery [with] one of the most appealing detective heroes to come along since Sam Spade or Philip Marlowe." The novel debuted at #2 on the New York Times Best Seller list on May 20, 2007, remaining on the list for 6 weeks.

== Proposed adaptations ==
=== Cancelled film adaptation ===
Producer Scott Rudin purchased the film rights to The Yiddish Policemen's Union in 2002, based on a one-and-a-half page proposal. In February 2008, Rudin told The Guardian that a film adaptation of The Yiddish Policemen's Union was in pre-production, to be written and directed by the Coen brothers. The Coen brothers were to begin working on the adaptation for Columbia Pictures after they completed filming of A Serious Man. Chabon stated that the Coens are "among [his] favorite living moviemakers[...] What's more, I think they are perfectly suited to this material in every way, from its genre(s) to its tone to its content."

In the fall of 2012, however, Chabon told Mother Jones that "the Coen brothers wrote a draft of a script and then they seemed to move on," and that the film rights had "lapsed back to me."

=== TV series ===
In January 2019, CBS Television Studios, PatMa Productions and Keshet Studios acquired the script from Chabon and his wife Ayelet Waldman to premium cable and streaming networks.

== See also ==
- Proposals for a Jewish state § Contemporary proposals for a second Jewish state
- Jewish Territorialist Organization

Awards
| Preceded by The Family Trade, The Hidden Family, and The Clan Corporate | Sidewise Award for Alternate History; 2008 | Succeeded by The Dragon's Nine Sons |
