= Empire State Building in popular culture =

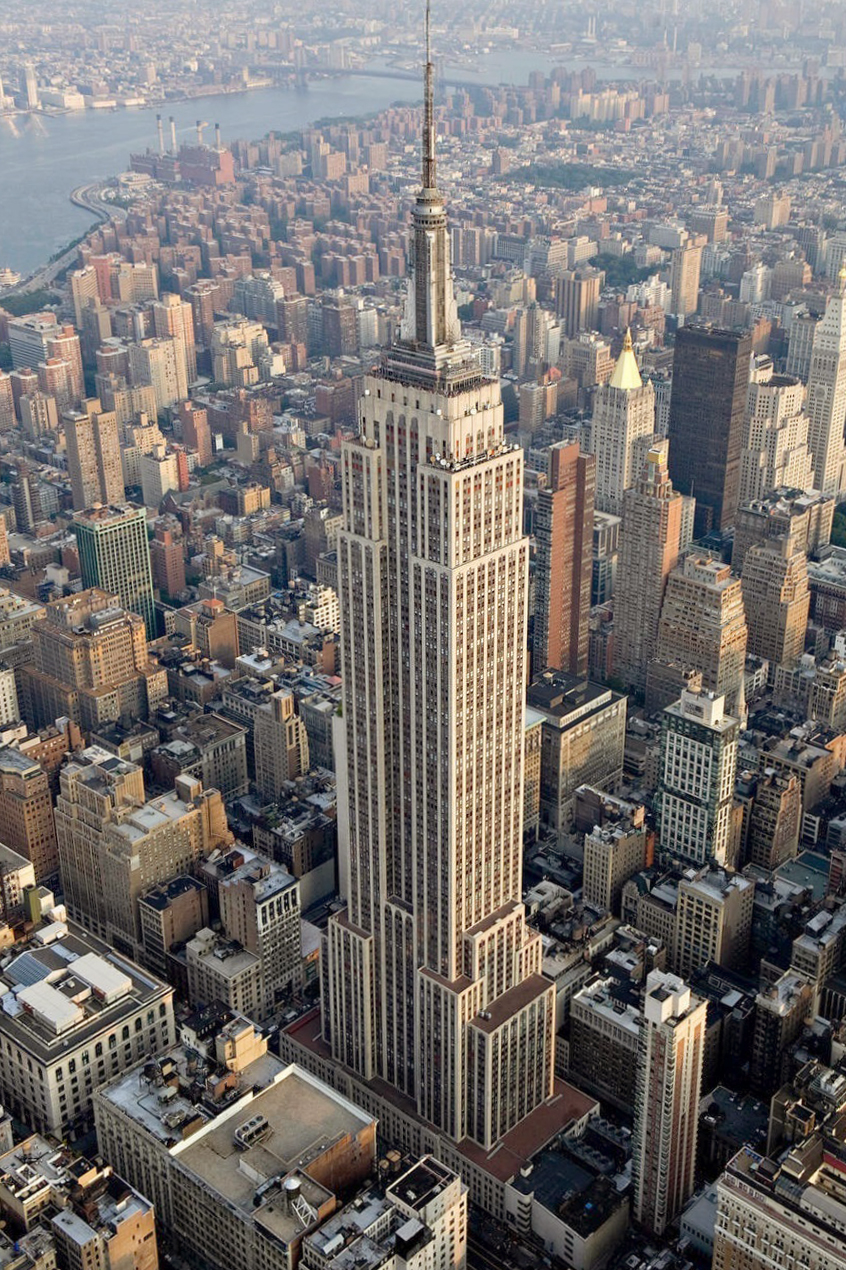
Aerial view in July 2012.

The Empire State Building is a 102-story skyscraper on Fifth Avenue between West 33rd and 34th Streets in Midtown, Manhattan, New York City. It has a roof height of 1,250 feet (381 m), and with its antenna included, it stands a total of 1,454 feet (443.2 m) tall. The Empire State Building stood as the world's tallest building for nearly 40 years, from its completion in early 1931 until the topping out of the original World Trade Center's North Tower in late 1970. It has been featured in numerous films, TV shows, songs, video games, books, photographs, and artwork.

== Film ==
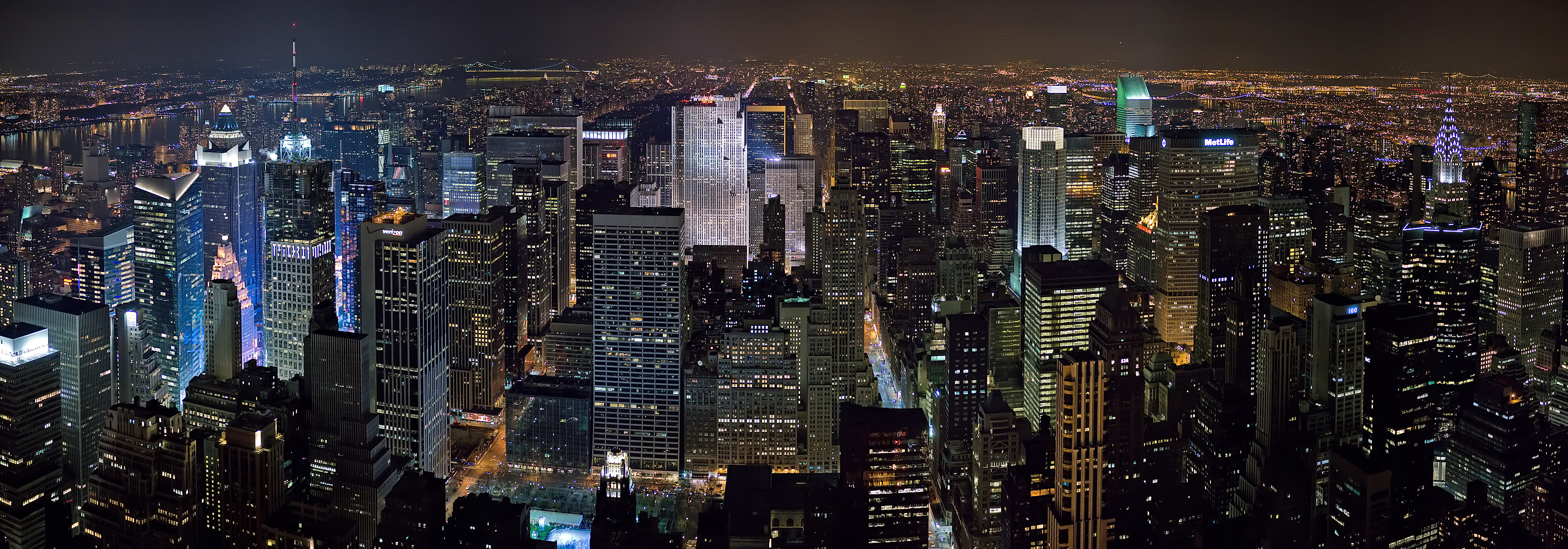
The Midtown skyline, as viewed from the observation deck at night in January 2006.

- Perhaps the most famous popular culture representation of the building is in King Kong (1933), in which the title character, a giant ape, climbs to the top to escape his captors, but falls to his death after being attacked by military biplanes. In 1983, for the film's fiftieth anniversary, a 90-foot (27 m) tall inflatable Kong was placed on the building mast above the observation deck by artist Robert Vicino. In 2005, Peter Jackson's remake of King Kong was released, set in 1930s New York City, including a final showdown between Kong and biplanes atop the Empire State Building. The 1976 remake of King Kong was set in a contemporary New York City and held its climactic scene on the twin towers of the World Trade Center. The Empire State Building and King Kong are both featured in the virtual reality world called the Oasis in Steven Spielberg's 2018 science fiction film Ready Player One.
- In the disaster film Deluge (1933), the Empire State Building is one of several buildings that collapse during the earthquake that hits New York.
- Love Affair (1939) involves a couple who plan to meet atop the Empire State Building, a rendezvous that is prevented by an automobile accident. The film was remade in 1957 (as An Affair to Remember) and in 1994 (again as Love Affair.)
- In the climax of The Thief (1952), the protagonist, an espionage agent for an unnamed foreign power, is pursued by an FBI agent from the 86th-floor observatory to the 102nd-floor observatory and then into the spire.
- Sleepless in Seattle (1993), a romantic comedy partially inspired by An Affair to Remember, climaxes with scenes in the Empire State Building's lobby and observatory. The 2013 drama film Burning Blue also features a romantic scene in which the Empire State Building is viewed from a neighboring building's rooftop when the lights come on at sunset.
- In the Looney Tunes cartoon "Much Ado About Nutting", a squirrel has so much difficulty opening a coconut he carries it to the Empire State Building's observation deck and tosses it over the edge. While the street is damaged by the impact, the coconut remains intact.
- In the 1946 Looney Tunes cartoon Baseball Bugs, Bugs Bunny is pitching in the Polo Grounds against the Gashouse Gorillas. In the bottom of the ninth, with two outs and Bugs protecting a one run lead, the opposition hits the ball out of the park for an apparent game-winning two-run homer. Bugs pursues the ball through New York City. The chase culminates at the "Umpire State Building". Bugs ascends to the top of the building by elevator and catches the ball for the third out, winning the game.
- In the Tom and Jerry cartoon Mouse in Manhattan, Jerry walks by and views the Empire State Building, along with other landmarks, including the Statue of Atlas at Rockefeller Center and Grand Central Terminal.
- Andy Warhol's 1964 silent film Empire is one continuous, eight-hour black-and-white shot of the Empire State Building at night. In 2004, the National Film Registry deemed its cultural significance worthy of preservation in the Library of Congress.
- In Percy Jackson & the Olympians: The Lightning Thief (2010), Mount Olympus is located over the Empire State Building, and there is a special elevator in the building to the "600th floor", which is supposed to be Olympus, just like in the book series.
- The building is chosen as Ground Zero for the target of a hydrogen bomb that is dropped on New York in Fail-Safe (1964).
- Both Zero Mostel and Gene Wilder go to the Observation Deck of the building in the original Mel Brooks film The Producers.
- In The Muppets Take Manhattan (1984), after all of his friends have left the city, Kermit the Frog rides to the top of the building, and staring out from the observation deck, defiantly rants that he's not giving up on their Broadway dream. Miss Piggy, his last friend in town, hears Kermit's closing line from the street: "Y'hear that, New York? The Frog is staying!"
- In One Fine Day (1996) the Empire State Building can be spotted in the background.
- In the 1998 disaster film Earthquake in New York, the Empire State Building is damaged and partially collapsed during an earthquake. However, it remains standing once the earthquake finishes.
- The Empire State Building has an appearance in the 1999 movie, Aftershock: Earthquake in New York. It can be seen when a news reporter in a helicopter describes the damage. The reporter says, "Empire State Building looks good..." it can be seen again when Mayor Bruce Lincoln is making a speech, and lastly the building can be seen in the background when the Statue of Liberty is shown to be under reconstruction. On the film's poster, the building is seen to have collapsed and the top of the building and its damaged antenna are resting on a nearby skyscraper, but in the actual film it remains standing.
- In Home Alone 2: Lost in New York (1992), the building is seen many times.
- In the 1996 film Independence Day, the Empire State Building is destroyed in an explosion caused by a UFO which destroys much of the city.
- The Empire State Building can be seen in the 1998 disaster film Armageddon, when a meteor shower hits New York. It can be spotted in some scenes such as when a meteor is heading toward the Chrysler Building the Empire State Buildings mooring mast can be seen.
- The building is damaged after the seas swamp New York City, in the 1998 film Deep Impact.
- The Empire State Building can be seen three times in the 1999 drama film Cruel Intentions. The first time it is seen is when Sebastian is driving toward Manhattan, the second time it is seen is when Sebastian makes a phone call on the Queensboro bridge, and the third time it is seen is when Annette drives away from Manhattan with the midtown Manhattan skyline in the background.
- In the 2001 film Zoolander, The Empire State Building can be seen in most scenes. Such as the funeral scene, the Chrysler Building, United Nations Building, Empire State Building, and MetLife building can be seen in the background. It can also be seen in the background when the "Mugato" headquarters is shown.
- In the ending of the 2002 film Gangs of New York, when gravestones are shown to be under the Brooklyn Bridge in a time lapse. The Empire State Building can be seen to the far right of the screen.
- In The Time Machine (2002), the Empire State Building is still standing in the year 2030, but dwarfed by several larger skyscrapers around it. It is not visible in later scenes set in a post-apocalyptic New York.
- The building can be seen in the 2002 comedy movie, Mr. Deeds. It can be seen when the Midtown Manhattan skyline is shown when the time turns from night to morning. It can be seen again when Deed is playing Tennis with Chuck, a part of the Midtown Manhattan skyline can be clearly seen in the background.
- The building is seen in the 2003 film Elf and serves as the workplace of Buddy's father. Several interior shots of the building can be seen. In one scene in which Buddy rides the elevator with an unknown man, Buddy pushes all of the floor destination buttons to resemble a Christmas tree.
- In the 2003 action film Daredevil, the Empire State Building can be seen when Kingpin's (the villain) tower is shown and it can be seen out the window when Daredevil is face to face with Kingpin. It can also be seen in the background when Daredevil is on the top of a church.
- The Empire State Building is seen in most Spider-Man films since it mostly takes place in New York. In Spider-Man (2002) when Spider-Man is fighting the Green Goblin by the Queensboro Bridge the building can be spotted next to the Chrysler Building. It can also be seen in Spider-Man 2 (2004) and Spider-Man 3 (2007) when a building is hit by a crane the Empire State Building can be spotted in the distance.
- In Sky Captain and the World of Tomorrow (2004), in an alternate 1939, the top of the building serves its original purpose of being a docking station for dirigibles, and the Hindenburg III docks at it on its maiden voyage.
- In the 2004 mockumentary film CSA: The Confederate States of America, the Empire State Building appears in the film in a news broadcast. The building is also mentioned on the film's website.
- In the 2005 disaster film End Day, a fictional scientist travels from London to New York. At one point in the film the camera shows the Empire State Building and a police helicopter flying in front of it.
- In the 2006 film Click, the building can be seen in numerous shots, specifically through an office window and other parts of the movie.
- In the 2006 movie, The Hoax, the Empire State Building can be seen in between the Chrysler Building and the MetLife Building when a helicopter is landing on top of a building.
- The building is seen in the background in Enchanted (2007).
- Many films have opened with the Empire State Building, such as West Side Story (1961), Honey (2003), The Taking of Pelham 123 (2009), Step Up 3D, The Other Guys (both 2010), The Mortal Instruments: City of Bones, A Case Of You (both 2013), Left Behind (2014), Manhattan Night (2016), and Otherhood (2019).
- In the film How to Lose Friends & Alienate People (2008), the Empire State Building can be seen in parts of the movies specifically can be seen throughout the window.
- In the 2008 romantic comedy drama film Nick & Norah's Infinite Playlist, the Empire State Building can be seen in many parts of the movie. Such as when Nick is driving toward Manhattan, the midtown Manhattan skyline is shown. It is seen again in a shot of the Manhattan skyline shown from the George Washington Bridge. Lastly it is seen in the background at night when Nick and Tris are in a car where she tries to seduce him and dances in front of the car.
- The 2008 film Meet Dave, a spaceship shaped like a human lands on Liberty Island and walks around Manhattan. In a scene where Dave is coming out the subway the Empire State Building can be seen in the background.
- In the 2009 film Watchmen, the building can be spotted in most parts. It can be seen through an office window with the World Trade Center behind it.
- In the 2009 film Knowing, the building is destroyed by a solar flare along with the rest of the world at the end of the film.
- In the Disney film The Sorcerer's Apprentice (2010), the Empire State Building can be seen in the background when one of the movies characters walks on one of the Chrysler Building's gargoyle eagles.
- In The Divide (2011), the building is destroyed by a nuclear bomb detonated on New York. It was heavily featured on posters promoting the film.
- In the 2011 film The Smurfs, in a scene where Gargamel escapes from prison the Manhattan skyline can be seen in the background including the Empire State Building.
- The Empire State Building can be seen many times in the 2011 comedy film Mr. Popper's Penguins. It can be seen in the background when Tom Popper is on the phone in Madison Square Park. It can be seen again through the window when Tom is at his office in the Bank of America Tower.
- The Empire State Building can be seen in the 2012 film The Dark Knight Rises as a skyscraper in the Gotham City skyline.
- In the romance comedy Lola Versus (2012), when Lola talks to her friends in Brooklyn Bridge Park, the Empire State Building can be seen sticking out in the background.
- The Empire State Building can be seen under construction in the 2013 film The Great Gatsby. Although the Empire State Building wasn't completed until 1931, the film takes place in the 1920s.
- In Superman II (1980), Ursa (Sarah Douglas) uses a flagpole to knock Superman (Christopher Reeve) into the tower of the building, knocking off its radio antenna, which falls into the street below. Superman manages to catch it before it hits the ground and re-attaches it to the building.
- In the 2013 comedy film Anchorman 2: The Legend Continues, when Ron Burgundy and his friends use their RV to get to Manhattan, the midtown manhattan skyline can be seen. In another part of the film when Ron and his friends are attacked by other news teams, the Empire State Building can be seen when a bomber plane attacks. The Empire State Building can also be seen along with the Chrysler Building in the movie's poster.
- In the 2014 film Love Is Strange, when Ben is painting on a roof of a building the Midtown Manhattan Skyline can be clearly seen.
- The Empire State Building can be seen in the 2014 drama and romance film Amira & Sam.
- In the action superhero movie, X-Men: Days of Future Past (2014), the Empire State Building can be seen in the opening of the movie. The building is seen to have been damaged and has many gaping holes, along with other buildings in midtown.
- In the 2014 drama romance film Chinese Puzzle, the Empire State Building can be seen multiple times in the film. It can be seen when Xavier is in a car, and the midtown skyline is shown through the window. The upper part of the Empire State Building can be seen in the background along with the Metropolitan Life Insurance Company Tower when Xavier is standing in the street. Lastly, it can be seen when Xavier is looking out the window at the midtown Manhattan skyline.
- The Empire State Building can be seen in the 2014 film 5 Flights Up.
- In the 2014 film A Most Violent Year, the building can be seen in numerous shots. Specifically when the main characters are looking at the Manhattan skyline.
- In the 2014 film Sharknado 2, a tornado filled with sharks enter Manhattan. The two tornadoes collide at the Empire State Building. The movie's characters go to the Empire State Buildings observation deck to set of an electrocution to get rid of the tornadoes. In another part of the movie, one character rides a shark while it falls from the sky and it lands on the Empire State Buildings spire.
- In a scene in the 2014 film Shelter, Tahir and Hannah talk in an apartment with the Empire State Building and Chrysler Building seen from the window. Hannah tells Tahir that if he concentrates he can change the lights on the Empire State Building with his mind. Eventually Tahir causes the lights to turn red out of anger.
- In the drama comedy film The Angriest Man in Brooklyn (2014), when Sharon apologizes to Henry on the Brooklyn Bridge, the Empire State Building can be seen in the background at one point in the scene.
- The Empire State Building can be seen in multiple parts of the 2014 film Manhattan Romance. For example, it can be seen when Tom is walking down 6th Avenue at night.
- In the 2015 comedy film Ted 2, John, Tami, and Ted go to New York to find an attorney. When they speak in the attorney's office the Empire State Building can be seen out the window
- The Empire State Building can be seen in the background along with the rest of the Midtown skyline in the 2015 movie, The Walk.
- In the 2016 film Nine Lives, in some parts of the film the building can be spotted in the background.
- In The 5th Wave (2016), the Empire State Building survives a tsunami that hits Manhattan during the second wave of an alien invasion.
- The Empire State Building can be seen many times in the 2016 film Pee-wee's Big Holiday. It can be seen when Pee-wee is talking to Marvin, a poster of New York can be seen in the background with the Statue of Liberty, Chrysler Building, and Empire State Building. It can be seen again when Pee-wee is in Manhattan looking around in his music number, and in one point of the song he sings about the Empire State Building.
- The Empire State Building can be seen in the 2016 romance/comedy How to Be Single. When the characters are in Madison Square Park at night, the building can be seen in the background.
- In the 2016 film Bakery in Brooklyn, Vivian talks to Paul on the phone while she rides her bike. In one part of that scene the Midtown Manhattan Skyline can be seen behind her.
- In Sully (2016), the Empire State Building can be seen in some parts of the movie.
- In the 2016 film, Teenage Mutant Ninja Turtles: Out of the Shadows, which takes place in New York, there are scenes including the Empire State Building, Chrysler Building, MetLife Building, One World Trade Center and many other buildings in New York City.
- In the opening of The Secret Life of Pets (2016), the camera flies by the Empire State Building, along with the Statue of Liberty and the Brooklyn Bridge, until it reaches to Central Park for the opening scene.
- In the science fiction film Oblivion (2013), the Empire State Building is seen buried in dirt up to the mooring mast sixty years after an alien invasion that destroyed New York. The antenna is used as a beacon to bring down an orbiting spacecraft and the observation deck is seen as an important plot point in a flashback sequence.
- The Empire State Building can be seen in the 2017 film Bushwick. It can be seen in the beginning of the film when the camera shows a birdseye view of Brooklyn with the Manhattan skyline in the background. It can be seen again when Manhattan is revealed to have been under attack.
- The Empire State Building can be seen in the film Dark Tower (2017), when a massive shadow looms over Midtown Manhattan.
- The building can be seen in the ending of the 2017 film The Fate of the Furious when the camera reveals the Manhattan Skyline looking downtown.
- In the 2017 Netflix Original Film The Incredible Jessica James, when Jessica is dancing on her roof the Empire State Building can be seen in the background.
- The Empire State Building can be seen in the 2017 film Thor: Ragnarok when the setting of the film changes to New York, a part of the Manhattan skyline is shown.
- In the 2018 comedy movie, I Feel Pretty, The Empire State Building can be seen in the background when Renee gets out of a Taxi cab.
- In the Netflix original film, Like Father (2018) the Empire State Building can be seen in a montage of establishing shots of New York City in the beginning of the movie.
- The Empire State Building can be seen in the 2018 Netflix Original film, Set It Up. When there is a party on top of a building it can be seen in the background along with the Bank of America Tower and 4 Times Square. And at the end of the film when Harper and Charlie kiss, the camera zooms out to reveal the Empire State Building along with other buildings near Bryant Park.
- The building is also seen in the 2018 film Ready Player One. In some scenes King Kong is seen on top of the building.
- In the 2018 film Skyscraper, when the main building of the film is shown on a scale compared to other buildings. The Empire State Building is seen on the scale.
- The Empire State Building can be seen when Paul is riding his bike down 5th Avenue in the 2018 film An Interview with God.
- In the 2018 film Avengers: Infinity War, the tower can be seen in an establishing shots and other scenes in the film.
- The Empire State Building can be seen in the animated film Spider-Man: Into the Spider-Verse (late 2018).
- In the 2019 comedy/drama movie, The Upside, the Empire State Building can be briefly seen in a car chase and when Philip is getting out of the Hospital.
- The Empire State Building is seen at the end of the 2019 film, Spider-Man: Far From Home.
- In the drama comedy film Someone Great (2019), the Empire State Building can be seen in a night establishing shot of Midtown Manhattan.
- The Empire State Building can be seen in the animated sequel, The Secret Life of Pets 2 (2019).
- The Empire State Building can be seen in the opening sequence of the 2019 action movie, Shaft.
- The tower along with some other buildings in the midtown skyline can be seen when an alien escapes from a window, this is featured in the 2019 film Men in Black: International.
- Many other films that feature the Empire State Building are listed on the building's own website.
- In Spider-Man: No Way Home (2021), Andrew Garfield's Peter Parker mentions that he uses the Empire State Building as a solace spot whenever he is feeling low.

== Television ==
- In the 1965 four-part Underdog cartoon serial "The Phoney Booths" (episodes 49–52), Underdog falls under the mental control of mad scientist Simon Bar Sinister. Simon orders Underdog to use his super powers to bring him valuable objects - including the Empire State Building, which Underdog lifts whole to bring it to Simon. In the end, circumstances release Underdog from Simon's control. He defeats the evil scientist and puts back the Empire State Building.
- The Empire State Building featured in the 1966 Doctor Who serial The Chase, in which the TARDIS lands on the roof of the building; The Doctor and his companions leave quite quickly, however, because the Daleks are close behind them. A Dalek is also seen on the roof of the building while it interrogates a human. In 2007, Doctor Who episodes "Daleks in Manhattan" and "Evolution of the Daleks" also featured the building, which the Daleks are constructing to use as a lightning conductor. Russell T Davies said in an article that "in his mind", the Daleks remembered the building from their last visit. The building also appears in the 2016 Christmas special The Return of Doctor Mysterio.
- The Empire State Building appears in the animated TV series Courage the Cowardly Dog.
- In the science fiction drama series Fringe, the observation deck of the Empire State Building serves its primary purpose as a docking station for zeppelins in the parallel universe shown in the second-season episode "Peter". It is also featured as a main location at the beginning of the third-season episode "Immortality".
- The Discovery Channel show MythBusters tested the urban myth which claims that if one drops a penny off the top of the Empire State Building, it could kill someone or put a crater in the pavement. The outcome was that, by the time the penny hits the ground, it is going roughly 65 mph (105 km/h) (terminal velocity for an object of its mass and shape), which is not fast enough to inflict lethal injury or put a crater into the pavement. The urban legend is a joke in the 2003 musical Avenue Q, where a character waiting atop the building for a rendezvous tosses a penny over the side—only to hit her rival.
- In Gerry Anderson's popular puppet series Thunderbirds, the episode Terror in New York City, the Empire State Building is being moved to a new location as the site around it is set for redevelopment. However, something goes wrong and the building collapses, trapping a reporter and his cameraman underneath the rubble. Their rescue is the focus of the rest of the episode.
- In the episode City of Steel of The Transformers TV series, the Empire State Building along with other buildings are dragged to the ground and replaced with Cybertronian towers.
- In the season 9 episode of The Simpsons, "The City of New York vs. Homer Simpson", the family are seen briefly in Empire State Building's observation deck.
- The building can be seen in the intro of the 1998 animated series Godzilla: The Series, when Godzilla climbs the Empire State Building.
- In the season 2 episode of Family Guy, "A Picture is Worth 1,000 Bucks", the family goes to Manhattan. A shot of the skyline is seen and when they go to the Empire State Building's observation deck, Peter asks Lois for a penny and he drops it off the building.
- The music video of the song "Everything is Everything" (by singer Lauryn Hill) prominently features the Empire State Building as the center of a city (record) turntable.
- The prime-time animated series, The Critic, shows the Empire State Building as one of the opening shots.
- In the comedic animated TV series Futurama, the Chrysler Building and Empire State Building can be seen many times in many episodes. For example, in the episode "Anthology of Interest I" Professor Farnsworth demonstrates his latest invention, the fing-longer by turning on the What-If Machine. Bender wants to ask it a question. What if he was 500 feet tall? The machine demonstrates that at 500 feet this leads to a fight between him and Zoidberg. Bender eventually gets shoved and falls onto the Empire State Building and the building goes right through him.
- The Empire State Building is featured in the intro of The 10th Kingdom (2000). In the intro the building crumbles and turns into a mountain, causing New York City to turn into a nature-like landscape.
- In the episode "First Time in New York" of the television series How I Met Your Mother (originally aired on January 8, 2007), the gang takes Robin's sister Katie to the Empire State Building. On the first day, they only got to the lobby, but they eventually went to the top the next day.
- In season 7, episode 12 of the American drama series Mad Men, Don is at a board room meeting. He turns and looks at the window, the next shot shows him looking at the Empire State Building with a plane flying far behind it. Indicating that he wants to do more in life.
- The Empire State Building is featured in a Kit Kat commercial, the building's lights turn on in sync with the melody.
- In season 4 of the mystery/crime series White Collar, the Empire State Building has a big effect on the plot of the season. A wanted man/ escaped prisoner is hiding somewhere in New York City. Peter and Neal find out he is hiding at the Empire State Building, specifically in an office on the 50th floor.
- The Empire State Building can be seen in many episodes of the Crime Drama series, Person of Interest. For example, when a group of men are having a conversation in Roosevelt Island with the Midtown Manhattan skyline behind them.
- The Empire State Building can be seen many times in the 2014 television series Taxi Brooklyn.
- In the television series Life After People episode "Heavy Metal", the Empire State Building collapses after around 200 years after human extinction due to saturated soil among the building's foundation pilings allows the building to lean. When gravity makes the building lean too far, it slips from the skyline and crashes to the streets below.
- It can be seen in the background in many episodes of the 2015 crime series, Limitless.
- The Empire State Building can be seen in most scenes of Marvel's Netflix scripted programming, such as Jessica Jones, Daredevil, Luke Cage, Iron Fist, and The Defenders.
- The Empire State Building appears in the 2013 Mickey Mouse season 1 episode "New York Weenie".
- In the episode "Last Tango, Then Paris" of the teen drama series Gossip Girl, Blair goes to the top of the Empire State Building to meet Chuck in order to save their relationship.
- In the fourth-season episode "Darkness on the Edge of Town" of Once Upon a Time, The Empire State Building can be seen in the distance of the New York City skyline.
- The Empire State Building was featured as a part of the challenge in the 26th episode of the animated series Total Drama: The Ridonculous Race.
- On October 15, 2018, Eminem performed his song "Venom" from the top of the building during a live segment of Jimmy Kimmel Live.
- In the season 2 episode The Incredible Shrinking Turtles of the 1987–1996 animated Teenage Mutant Ninja Turtles television series and its TMNT Adventures comic adaptation, Shredder uses the extraterrestrial Eye of Sarnath crystal to shrink the Empire State Building into dollhouse-size.
- The Empire State Building is the home of Mount Olympus throughout the series Percy Jackson and the Olympians.

== Video games ==
- In the 2001 video game Grand Theft Auto III and its prequels Grand Theft Auto Advance and Grand Theft Auto: Liberty City Stories, a building resembling a combination of the Empire State and Chrysler Buildings is located in Bedford Point on Staunton Island in Liberty City. The game's rendition shares a similar facade design as part of the Empire State Building, but has somewhat similar terms of structural design of the Chrysler Building, with a crowned roof topped with a pinnacle.
- In the 2008 video game Grand Theft Auto IV, the Empire State Building appears as the Rotterdam Tower. It is the tallest building in Liberty City. The building's name is a reference to New Rotterdam, the Dutch colonial town which became the present day Liberty City. The Rotterdam Tower also appears in Grand Theft Auto: Chinatown Wars, however, only the bottom floors are rendered due to the game's top-down angle.
- In the open world action video game, Prototype 2 which takes place in an apocalyptic era, you can base jump from the Empire State Building. The building itself looks damaged and has holes on multiple floors.
- In the action role playing video game, Tom Clancy's The Division, which released in 2016 takes place in New York City. The Empire State Building and other famous New York landmarks are included in the video game. The Empire State Building looks different due to licensing purposes. The Chrysler Building and Empire State Building can be seen on the game's cover.
- In the 2017 video game Super Mario Odyssey, the New Donk City Hall building is based on the Empire State Building. The building is located in the Metro Kingdom. The kingdom itself is loosely based on New York City with many references to the Donkey Kong arcade game and the Donkey Kong Country series.
- The Empire State Building is a featured landmark to place in a city in the PC games Sim City 3000 and Sim City 4.
- In the 2018 video game, Marvel's Spider-Man, Spider-Man can climb up Empire State Building (even all the way up to its antenna) along with other New York buildings. The Empire State Building also appears in most other Spider-Man video games, notably in Spider-Man: Web of Shadows where it is renamed the Trask Building (likely as a reference to the character Bolivar Trask) and is used to build a sonic generator to destroy the symbiote invasion.
- In the 1998 PC game JumpStart Music, part of the JumpStart educational game series, a parody version of the building shaped like a violin is seen in a fantasy realm called Music Land. Words on the building proclaim it to be the "Empire String Building".
- In Wolfenstein II: The New Colossus, a Nazi atomic bomb was dropped on New York, leveling most of the city. The Empire State Building survived the bombing, and is used as a refuge for survivors and rebels due to the fact that its upper floors are safe from the nuclear fallout, which is at its highest concentrations nearer street level.

== Literature and comics ==
- H. G. Wells' 1933 science fiction novel The Shape of Things to Come, written in the form of a history book published in the far future, includes the following passage: "Up to quite recently Lower New York has been the most old-fashioned city in the world, unique in its gloomy antiquity. The last of the ancient skyscrapers, the Empire State Building, is even now under demolition in C.E. 2106!".
- In the 1942 novel magazine called Startling Stories, specifically Startling Stories: City of Glass. A giant man attacks New York City. He is seen to be holding the Empire State Building under one arm and the Statue of Liberty under the other.
- In the 1979 comic, Meteor (Marvel Comics Super Special), multiple meteors rain down on New York City. Showing meteors destroying the World Trade Center, Rockefeller Center, and Empire State Building.
- In the 1980 John Varley novel Wizard, Cirocco is named as owner of the Empire State Building, which she has restored.
- David Macaulay's 1980 illustrated book Unbuilding depicts the Empire State Building being purchased by a Middle Eastern oil billionaire in the early 1990s and disassembled piece by piece, to be transported to Saudi Arabia and rebuilt there. The mooring mast is rebuilt in a park at its former location in Manhattan, while the remainder of the building is lost at sea.
- In the 1989 Marvel Comics storyline Inferno, the Empire State Building is used as a staging ground of a demonic invasion of Manhattan. Several tie-in comics show the building being "mutated" by the demons' presence.
- Giannina Braschi's Empire of Dreams, a Latin American poetry epic published in 1988, featured a pastoral revolution on the top floor of the Empire State Building, where shepherds danced and sang songs of revolution.
- The Empire State Building is featured prominently as both a setting and integral plot device throughout much of Michael Chabon's 2000 Pulitzer Prize-winning novel, The Amazing Adventures of Kavalier & Clay.
- In his "biography", Doc Savage: His Apocalyptic Life, Philip Jose Farmer theorizes that the skyscraper in which Doc Savage lived and where he met with his comrades, had his laboratories, etc., was the Empire State Building. Since the 86th Floor (mentioned in the Savage stories as his floor) was the Observatory, one may presume that Doc "actually" lived on another floor.
- In Rick Riordan's Camp Half-Blood Chronicles series, the Empire State Building is shown as the headquarters of the Olympian Gods, where the Greek gods live and hold their meetings.
- In the 1961 children's novel James and the Giant Peach by Roald Dahl, the giant peach is dropped onto the lightning rod of the Empire State Building at the end. This novel was later adapted in a film under the same name in 1996, which features the same part where the peach falls onto the Building's antenna.
- In the 2011 novel Ghostbusters Vol. 1 Issue #2, Idulnas, while in possession of Jim Silver, ascended the Empire State Building in order to commune with the essence of Gozer as nearly finished its reformation. Idulnas needed Ray Stantz back in Manhattan and animated the nearby bear statue of Wall Street to draw him into a trap. It can also be seen in the 2016 novel Ghostbusters International #1. It can also be seen labeled on a map of Manhattan 2017 novel Ghostbusters 101 3.
- In the sci-fi/alternate history series of novels Wild Cards, the 86th floor is the location of New York's premier chic restaurant, Aces High, a very popular hangout for the superpowered aces.
- In the alternate history novel Fallout part of The Hot War series by Harry Turtledove, where the Korean War escalates into World War III, the Empire State Building, which stood as the world tallest building for 21 years up to that point, is toppled by the Soviet atomic bomb which hit New York City in May 1952. The collapsing skyscraper crushed a nearby hotel with the equivalent of "a sledgehammer hitting a railroad spike". Among those killed in the crushed hotel was politician Averell Harriman, a key adviser to President Harry S. Truman, and possible Democratic candidate for the 1952 US presidential election.
- In the 1951 comic book series, Super Science Stories, volume 8. On the cover of the comic three UFOs are seen attacking New York City, the Empire State Building is seen to be on fire along with the streets below.
- In the first issue of Atomic War! published in November 1952, New York City is hit with a Soviet atomic bomb in 1960, the Empire State Building, the Chrysler Building and the Headquarters of the United Nations are all shown collapsing during the bombing of the city. Both the Empire State and Chrysler Buildings are also shown collapsing on the cover of the same issue.
- In the 1955 science fiction magazine, Fantastic Science Fiction, the Empire State Building is in the Fourth Volume, specifically on the cover it can be seen sticking out of a giant wave along with some other buildings in New York.
- In the 1980 comic, Archie's Mad House No. 120, when aliens invade earth, two spaceships take the Statue of Liberty and Empire State Building.

== Other ==
- The Empire State Building appears in the foreground of the album cover for Standing on the Shoulder of Giants, a 2000 studio album by English rock band Oasis.
- A 7.6 feet (2.3 m) scale model built from 12,000 LEGO bricks over 250 hours is featured along with other notable buildings in the LEGO Architecture: Towering Ambition exhibition at the National Building Museum in Washington, D.C.
- A replica of the Empire State Building is at Las Vegas' New York-New York Hotel and Casino.
- Lego released a set based on iconic New York City landmarks, including the Empire State Building
