= Telegraph Avenue (novel) =

2012 novel by Michael Chabon

- First edition cover
- Author: Michael Chabon
- Language: English
- Genre: Literary fiction
- Publisher: HarperCollins
- Publication date: September 11, 2012
- Publication place: United States
- Media type: Print (Hardcover)
- Pages: 465
- ISBN: 978-0061493348

Telegraph Avenue is a novel by Michael Chabon, published on September 11, 2012. An enhanced e-book edition was released online on July 25, 2012. The novel's setting is North Oakland and Berkeley, California. The title refers to Telegraph Avenue, which runs through both cities.

== Plot ==
Set in 2004, Archy Stallings, who is black, and Nat Jaffe, who is Jewish, are proprietors of Brokeland Records, a record shop located in north Oakland for twelve years. Their used vinyl business is threatened by ex-NFL superstar Gibson Goode's planned construction of his second Dogpile Thang megastore two blocks away. They feel betrayed because their local city councilman, Chandler Flowers, has switched sides and now supports Dogpile.

A subplot concerns their wives, Gwen Shanks and Aviva Roth-Jaffe, who together run Berkeley Birth Partners, a midwifery practice. A home birth goes wrong, the mother is rushed to the hospital, and the attending physician, after taking care of the mother, insults Gwen in a racially tinged manner. She blows up, and the doctor has the hospital start procedures to drop Gwen and Aviva's hospital privileges.

Another storyline concerns Luther Stallings, Archy's father, an actor in blaxploitation films in the 70s. He was never a part of Archy's life, and Archy wants nothing to do with him. Luther has been in and out of jail and on and off drugs since his acting career ended, has been clean for over a year, and he keeps himself trim. He is involved with his former co-star Valetta Moore.

Luther had been best friends with Chandler in the old days. Their friendship came to an end after Luther abetted Chandler in the murder of a drug dealer. Luther is trying to exploit his knowledge in order to finance the making of a film.

Another storyline concerns Julius Jaffe, Nat and Aviva's 14-year-old son, and his new best buddy, Titus Joyner, who has shown up from Texas after his grandmother died. Titus, it turns out, is Archy's long-lost son. His arrival is the last straw in Gwen's relationship with Archy.

Setting up a gig for a fundraiser for an Illinois politician, Barack Obama, running for U.S. Senate, Archy learns of the death of Cochise Jones, Archy's spiritual father, and Archy fills in. Obama is impressed with the performance and tells Gwen he admires Archy's dedication to doing what he loves. Gwen takes those words to heart and resolves to stand up for herself. The first stand she takes is to walk out on Archy.

The funeral for Jones is held in the store. Plans are made, people get drunk, and the stage is set for shaking up everyone's future.

== Marketing ==
As part of the book's marketing, HarperCollins created a real-world Brokeland Records as a pop-up store. To coincide with the book launch, an independent Oakland bookstore was, for one week, September 7–14, 2012, made over into a used jazz record store, using stock from an independent dealer. In addition to the new signage and stock, "Brokeland Records" bags and other paraphernalia were provided.

The novel references numerous albums from the era, including works by Miles Davis, Yes, and Andy Gibb.

== Themes ==
In The New York Times, Jennifer Egan wrote, "In the end, Chabon's novel suggests, what has the power to fill the void inside us isn't artifacts, but paternity." In The Guardian, Attica Locke wrote that the novel contains "themes of fatherhood, abandonment, diaspora and complex questions of identity".

== Reception ==
Matt Feeney of The New Yorker wrote, "Chabon's characters join with the giddy excess and unlikely rigor of his prose to mount a sort of meta-argument that we might bridge racial distance using the skills found in our bigger-hearted novelists". Attica Locke called it "magnificent", praising the author's prose and knowledge of black music.

Ron Charles of The Washington Post felt that "despite Chabon's dazzling brilliance as a stylist, huge sections [...] read like they've been written by a man being paid by the word who has a balloon mortgage due."
