= A Model World and Other Stories =

- First edition cover
- Author: Michael Chabon
- Cover artist: Painting: Robert Bordo; Design: Linda Kosarin
- Language: English
- Genre: Short stories
- Publisher: William Morrow and Company
- Publication date: 1991
- Publication place: United States
- Media type: Print (hardback & paperback)
- Pages: 207 pp (first edition, hardback)
- ISBN: 0-688-09553-4 (first edition, hardback)
- OCLC: 22181371
- Dewey Decimal: 813/.54 20
- LC Class: PS3553.H15 M95 1991

A Model World and Other Stories is a 1991 collection of short stories by Michael Chabon. It was his first story collection and second book, following the 1988 novel, The Mysteries of Pittsburgh.

== Contents ==
=== Part I: A Model World ===
- "S ANGEL" - Ira, a 4th year UCLA drama student attends his cousin Sheila's Jewish wedding reception in a Pasadena hotel where he is attracted to Carmen, an older woman from Altadena, but things don't turn out as expected. (online text from The New Yorker, Oct 22 1990 - subscription required)
- "Ocean Avenue" - on Ocean Avenue, architect Bobby Lazar unexpectedly meets his ex-wife Suzette but they clash over their divorce - she sold his collection of William Powell memorabilia, he sold her collection of 1958/59 Barbie Dolls. (online text from The New Yorker, October 29, 1989 - subscription required)
- "A Model World" - In a bookstore in Long Beach, Levine finds a book called Antarctic Models of Induced Nephokinesis (cloud control) published in 1970, the very subject he is writing his dissertation on, and he decides to plagiarize it.(online text from The New Yorker, May 8, 1989 - subscription required)
- "Blumenthal on the Air" - the title character works as a DJ on a Paris radio station and lives near Père Lachaise Cemetery with his Iranian wife Roksana, whom he married to save from deportation. Strains in their relationship come to a head on Bastille Day on a visit to Le Pouliguen. (first published in Mademoiselle in 1987)
- "Smoke" - Matt Magee, a baseball pitcher is attending the funeral of his catcher in Pittsburgh who was killed in a car wreck. (online text from The New Yorker, March 25, 1990 - subscription required)
- "Millionaires" - Vince and Harry share everything except girls, but when Harry breaks up with Kim, Vince seizes the opportunity. (online text from The New Yorker, 21 Jan 1990 - subscription required)

=== Part II: The Lost World ===
- "The Little Knife" - On what turns out to be their last family holiday together, travelling down the I-95 to Nags Head, North Carolina, Nathan Shapiro's parents have a row and finish the holiday early. (online text from The New Yorker, 4 Apr 1988 - subscription required)
- "More Than Human" - On their weekly Thursday night trip to local libraries, Nathan's father fails to tell him about his impending divorce. (first appeared in Gentleman's Quarterly in 1989)
- "Admirals" - 18 months after the divorce, Nathan and his brother travel with their father and his girlfriend from Ellicott City to Annapolis. (online text The New Yorker, 6 Sep 1987 - subscription required)
- "The Halloween Party" - Nathan resolves to tell Eleanor Parnell, a friend of his mother, of his love for her at a Halloween party she is hosting. (online text, The New Yorker, 18 Sep 1988)
- "The Lost World" - After his mothers wedding, and hearing that his fathers wife is expecting a baby, Nathan and three friends get drunk and pay a visit to Chaya Feldman an old friend of Nathan who has a reputation for promiscuity.(online text The New Yorker, 13 Aug 1990)
