= Gentlemen of the Road =

2007 novel by Michael Chabon

- First edition cover
- Author: Michael Chabon
- Illustrator: Gary Gianni
- Language: English
- Genre: Historical novel, adventure novel
- Publisher: (United States) Del Rey Books, (United Kingdom) Sceptre
- Publication date: October 30, 2007
- Publication place: United States
- Media type: Print (hardcover) and audio CD
- Pages: 208 pp (1st edition, hardcover)
- ISBN: 978-0-345-50174-5 (1st edition, hardcover)

Gentlemen of the Road is a 2007 serial novel by American author Michael Chabon. It is a "swashbuckling adventure" set in the khaganate of Khazaria (now southwest Russia) around AD 950. It follows two Jewish bandits who become embroiled in a rebellion and a plot to restore a displaced Khazar prince to the throne.

== Plot summary ==
The story centers on two world-traveling Jewish bandits who style themselves with the euphemism "gentlemen of the road." Amram is a hulking Abyssinian (African) who is equally proficient with an axe as a game of shatranj; he is haunted by the disappearance of his daughter many years ago. His companion is Zelikman, a Frankish (German) Jewish physician who uses an oversized bloodletting lancet as a rapier. Zelikman has a morbid personality due to the trauma of watching his family slaughtered in a pogrom.

The two bandits begin in the Kingdom of Arran, where they con the customers of an inn with a staged duel. Before they can collect their winnings, a mahout attempts to hire them to safeguard his charge, Filaq, a fugitive Khazar prince. Filaq's family was murdered by the usurping bek, Buljan. Before the pair can give their answer, Buljan's assassins kill the mahout, and the two gentlemen escape with Filaq, intent on collecting a reward from his wealthy relatives. Filaq, on the other hand, is committed to escaping and taking vengeance on Buljan.

The group arrives at the home of Filaq's relatives and discovers that everyone has been slaughtered. Filaq is abducted by the band of mercenaries responsible, who have been searching for him on Buljan's behalf. Filaq manages to sow discord among the mercenaries, winning most of them over to his plan to unseat Buljan. One of the dissenters, named Hanukkah, is left for dead on the roadside; after Zelikman heals him, Hanukkah switches his allegiance, devoting himself to Zelikman.

Filaq's band of mercenaries are, however, slaughtered by an army of Arsiyah in Khazar service, and Filaq and then Amram are captured by this army- who do not know who Filaq is. The Arsiyah swiftly march north in an attempt to relieve a town being raided by raiders from Kievan Rus', but the army arrives too late to save the town. Filaq attempts to rally the demoralized troops to rescue his kidnapped brother Alp, but the army decides to place Filaq on the bek's throne instead. The army travels to the Khazar capital of Atil, but a ruse by Buljan leaves the Arsiyah army obliterated. Filaq is captured and exposed to all as a girl. Amram is also captured while trying to rescue her.

In disguise as a Radanite, Zelikman meets with Buljan and manages to rescue Amram. Beaten and raped, Filaq is sold to a brothel where Zelikman and Amram have been taking refuge. They treat her injuries and then plan to see the kagan, the spiritual ruler of Khazaria. Zelikman uses his physician's skills to anesthetize the kagan's guards and gain an audience. The kagan agrees to help, as long as Zelikman helps him fake his own death to escape from his life of comfortable imprisonment.

Filaq meets with tarkhan of the newly-arrived Khazar army in disguise as her brother Alp, who, the kagan has revealed, died in Rus' captivity. The tarkhan supports her claim to the position of bek, and the Khazar army secures control of the capital in Alp's name. While bargaining with a Rus' captain for safe passage away from Atil, Buljan is killed by a war elephant. After the successful countercoup, Filaq and Zelikman make love for the first, and probably last, time in each of their lives. Filaq begins her life as Alp, both bek and kagan of Khazaria, while Zelikman and Amram leave to pursue their fortunes elsewhere.

== Publishing history ==
The novel originally appeared in fifteen installments in The New York Times Magazine from January 28 to May 6, 2007. In October 2007, Del Rey Books (Sceptre in the United Kingdom) published the novel in hardcover, with a new afterword written by Chabon.

== Influences ==
Chabon said he agreed to write the serial because he has "always been intrigued by accounts and legends of the Khazars" and the idea of an ancient Jewish Kingdom. To prepare for writing the novel (which for a few months had the working title Jews with Swords), Chabon researched the Khazars and "tried to let it all sink in." He also re-read the historical romances of Alexandre Dumas, père, Fritz Leiber, George MacDonald Fraser, and Michael Moorcock, to whom the novel is dedicated.
