= Moonglow (novel) =

Book by Michael Chabon

- Author: Michael Chabon
- Language: English
- Subject: Memoir
- Publisher: Harper
- Publication date: November 22, 2016
- Publication place: United States
- Media type: Hardback
- Pages: 430
- ISBN: 978-0-06-222555-9 (Hardcover)

Moonglow is a 2016 novel by Michael Chabon. The book chronicles the life of Chabon's grandfather, a WW2 soldier, engineer and rocket enthusiast who marries a troubled Jewish survivor from France and lives a challenging, wandering life in postwar America. Chabon tells the story using a mixture of strict memoir and creative fiction writing. The narrator functions as a proxy for the author, Chabon.

== Plot summary ==
The novel is about the story of the author's (Chabon) grandfather. Throughout the book, the grandfather's name is not referred to.

The story is sort of a memoir, jumping around in time. It starts with the narrator stating how his grandfather was arrested.

== Reception ==
Sam Sacks writing for The Wall Street Journal appreciated the non-fiction elements of the novel in contrast to Chabon's other works. Sacks said, "Moonglow is a movingly bittersweet novel that balances wonder with lamentation." For The New York Times, Michiko Kakutani found that, "Mr. Chabon weaves these knotted-together tales together into a tapestry that’s as complicated, beautiful and flawed as an antique carpet. […] Although 'Moonglow' grows overly discursive at times, it is never less than compelling when it sticks to the tale of Mike's grandparents — these damaged survivors of World War II who bequeath to their family a legacy of endurance, and an understanding of the magic powers of storytelling to provide both solace and transcendence". In the Sunday New York Times Book Review, critic A.O. Scott wrote, "Whatever else it is — a novel, a memoir, a pack of lies, a mishmash — this book is beautiful."

The book was discussed in January 2017 on BBC Radio 4's Saturday Review.

Moonglow was a finalist for the 2016 National Book Critics Circle Award in fiction.
