= Maps and Legends =

Essay collection by Michael Chabon

- First edition cover
- Author: Michael Chabon
- Language: English
- Genre: Essay collection
- Publisher: McSweeney's
- Publication date: May 1, 2008
- Publication place: United States
- Media type: Print (Hardcover)
- Pages: 222 pp
- ISBN: 1-932416-89-7
- OCLC: 176924865

Maps and Legends is a 2008 collection of sixteen essays by American author Michael Chabon, his first book-length foray into nonfiction. Several of these essays are defenses of the author's work in genre literature (such as science fiction, fantasy, and comics), while others are more autobiographical, explaining how the author came to write several of his most popular works.

== Reception ==
Prior to its release, the book received harsh criticism from Publishers Weekly, which declared Chabon to be "bitter and defensive about his love for genre fiction such as mysteries and comic books", adding, "It's hard to imagine the audience for this book." Many subsequent newspaper and magazine reviewers have been positive. In The New York Times, Mark Kamine wrote that "[E]ntertainment, as Chabon argues in this collection's opening essay, is what literary art all boils down to. As in all his books, there's plenty of it to be had in Maps and Legends." San Francisco Gate called the collection "fascinating", O: The Oprah Magazine said that "Vital energy and a boundless appetite for risk give these essays their electric charge", and Harper's Magazine noted that "What is so startling is how much more interesting most of these indulgences are to read about in Chabon's pages than they were on their own, in the pulpy original; as if the nostalgic novelist, like the magician-for-hire in his Amazing Adventures of Kavalier & Clay, can make paper roses consumed by fire bloom from a pile of ash."

== Contents ==
- "Trickster in a Suit of Lights: Thoughts on the Modern Short Story", elements of which originally appeared in McSweeney's and Best American Short Stories 2005.
- "Maps and Legends" (about Columbia, Maryland), originally published in Architectural Digest in April 2001.
- "Fan Fictions: On Sherlock Holmes", originally appeared as "Inventing Sherlock Holmes" and "The Game's Afoot", published in The New York Review of Books on February 10, 2005, and February 24, 2005.
- "Ragnarok Boy", originally appeared, in a different form, in The New York Review of Books.
- "On Daemons & Dust", originally appeared, in a different form, in The New York Review of Books.
- "Kids' Stuff", a revised version of the keynote speech from the 2004 Eisner Awards Ceremony.
- "The Killer Hook: On Howard Chaykin's American Flagg!", is previously unpublished.
- "Dark Adventure: On Cormac McCarthy's The Road", originally appeared as "After the Apocalypse", published in The New York Review of Books on February 15, 2007.
- "The Other James", a revised version of the introduction to Casting the Runes and Other Ghost Stories.
- "Landsman of the Lost", originally appeared as the introduction to Julius Knipl, Real Estate Photographer.
- "Thoughts on the Death of Will Eisner", originally appeared as the introduction to Will Eisner: A Spirited Life.
- "My Back Pages", originally appeared, in a different form, in The New York Review of Books.
- "Diving into the Wreck", originally appeared in Swing.
- "The Recipe for Life" (about golems), originally published in The Washington Post Book World in 2000.
- "Imaginary Homelands" (about the Yiddish language), elements of which originally appeared as "Guidebook to a Land of Ghosts", originally published in Civilization, June/July 1997, and reprinted as "The Language of Lost History" in Harper's Magazine in October 1997.
- "Golems I Have Known, or, Why My Elder Son's Middle Name is Napoleon", is previously unpublished.
