= Summerland (Chabon novel) =

2002 fantasy young adult novel by Michael Chabon

- Author: Michael Chabon
- Cover artist: William Joyce
- Language: English
- Genre: Fantasy novel
- Publisher: Miramax (part of Hyperion)
- Publication date: September 17, 2002
- Publication place: United States
- Media type: Print (Hardcover and Paperback) and audio-CD
- Pages: 500 (hardcover edition)
- ISBN: 0-7868-0877-2 (hardcover edition)
- OCLC: 50536236
- LC Class: PZ7.C3315 Su 2002

Summerland is a 2002 fantasy young adult novel by American writer Michael Chabon. It is about young children who save the world from destruction by playing baseball, the central theme and symbol throughout the novel. Summerland weaves elements of a World Series, parallel-universe road trip, and a hero's odyssey. The book received mixed reviews; The New York Times called it "bewilderingly busy" and likened it to "the novelization of an animated action film".

== Plot summary ==
The story begins on a small island off the coast of Washington called Clam Island. The central character, Ethan Feld, is on one of the island's baseball teams despite being terrible at the game. He encounters a gracious werefox, Cutbelly, who explains the Lodgepole, a giant tree connecting all worlds, to the ignorant Ethan. Cutbelly explains that the evil Coyote plans to destroy the Lodgepole, an event called "Ragged Rock", by destroying Murmury Well. He takes Ethan to the Summerlands where they meet small Indian-looking people called ferishers. Coyote captures Ethan's father and forces him to create another batch of 'picofiber' to form the hose with which he is going to poison Murmury Well. Ethan enters the Summerlands with fellow baseball team members Thor Wignutt and Jennifer T. Rideout, in pursuit of his father and to prevent Ragged Rock. On their travels through the Summerlands, the three assemble a baseball team and play their way across the land, meeting players from legend and literature, and a couple from their own world.

== Mythology ==
Many links to different types of mythology are evident in the novel. The two most prevalent are Norse mythology and Native American mythology. Certain examples are subtly referenced, such as in the name of the Felds' car, Skidbladnir, known in Norse myths as the legendary vehicle of Freyr, so well crafted it can fold up and fit in his pocket. Also, the name of Thor Wignutt is a reference to the Norse god of storms, Thor. Coyote introduces himself as Loki, Norse god of chaos at one point, and the term "Ragged Rock", meaning the end of the world, translates to the Norse Ragnarok, the final battle in which the world is destroyed and reborn in the Skaldic poems. Finally, the Lodgepole, tree of the worlds, is based on Yggdrasil, the world tree of the Norse, and Murmury Well (the well Coyote means to poison) is Mimir's Well.

The names and actions of Coyote (aka Glooscap, Satan and other monikers), and Raven are of Native American origin, while the legend of La Llorona is of Mexican origin. The tales of the Big Liars are taken from heroes of American folklore:

- The Tall Man with the Axe (Paul Bunyan),
- The Tall Man with the Big Maul (Joe Magarac),
- The Tall Man with the Harpoon (Old Stormalong),
- The Tall Man with the Pole (Mike Fink),
- The Man with the Knife in His Boot (possibly Stagger Lee),
- The Man with the Rattlesnake Necktie (Pecos Bill),
- The Tall Man with the Hammer (John Henry),
- Annie Christmas (Female Mississippi keelboat pilot), and
- Judge Roy Bean, owner of the Jersey Lily Saloon.

The "big one-eyed bully" referenced by Coyote near the end of the book may be a reference to Odin. Chiron Brown (Ringfinger) the scout who recruits Ethan as a hero, is named after the Centaur Chiron (His nickname probably comes from the Hall of Famer Mordecai Brown though); the role of Chiron in the Prometheus myth (Prometheus being one of the masks of Coyote) adds depth and resonance to the character Ringfinger Brown. Chiron's role in finding Ethan is also appropriate as Chiron the centaur was known for training great men and heroes. Old Mr. Wood may be a reference to Odin, who is also known as Woden, which is close to the name Wood. Additionally, in the epilogue, or the section titled "Home", the baseball that appears in the New Jersey Park signed "Van Lingle Mungo" is an allusion to the baseball player of the same name.

== Non-mythological references ==
One of Jennifer T. Rideout's great-aunts is named Aunt Shambleau. "Shambleau" is a word invented by science fiction writer C.L. Moore, the title of one of her Northwest Smith stories, about sexual addiction; the titular shambleau is a medusa-figure. Aunt Shambleau enforces behavior among her great-nieces and nephews by threatening to take off her dark glasses (although, when in fact she does so, her eyes are no different from those of other humans).
