= Escapist (character) =

The Escapist
- Cover to Michael Chabon Presents the Amazing Adventures of the Escapist #1 (Feb. 2004).

Publication information
- Publisher: Novel: Random House; Comics: Dark Horse Comics
- First appearance: Novel: The Amazing Adventures of Kavalier & Clay (Sept. 2000); Comics: Michael Chabon Presents the Amazing Adventures of the Escapist #1 (Feb. 2004)
- Created by: Michael Chabon

In-story information
- Alter ego: Tom Mayflower

The Escapist is a superhero character created by Michael Chabon in the 2000 novel The Amazing Adventures of Kavalier & Clay. In the novel, the Escapist is a fictional character created by the comics writer protagonists. The character later featured in the metafictional work Michael Chabon Presents the Amazing Adventures of the Escapist and Brian K. Vaughan's comic The Escapists.

Chabon created the Escapist as an homage to the heroes of the Golden Age of Comic Books. The character's abilities as an escape artist are inspired by escape artist Harry Houdini as well as Robin Hood and Albert Schweitzer. Another inspiration was the early illusionist career of comic book artist Jim Steranko.

== Publication history ==
=== Kavalier & Clay ===
Introduced in Chabon's novel in 2000, the Escapist is said to be the creation of the book's protagonists, the cousins Joe Kavalier and Sam Clay, a pair of Jewish comic book creators in the 1930s and 1940s. The character's modus operandi is part of a recurring theme of escapism in the novel, representing the imaginative and positive effects of escapism in superhero comics as well as Kavalier and Clay's attempts to escape from the troubles of their past. Joe Kavalier has fled to America from Nazi-occupied Prague in Europe, leaving the rest of his family behind. Unable to help them, he starts fleeing from himself and everyone trying to get close to him. Sam Clay also wants to escape from himself – both his polio-stricken body and repressed homosexuality.

Within the story, the Escapist makes his first appearance in Amazing Midget Radio Comics #1, published by Empire Comics, a former novelty device company. He provides Kavalier and Clay with a measure of success and fame. However, having signed the rights to the character to the publisher, they make comparatively little from the massively successful character.

=== Comics adaptation ===
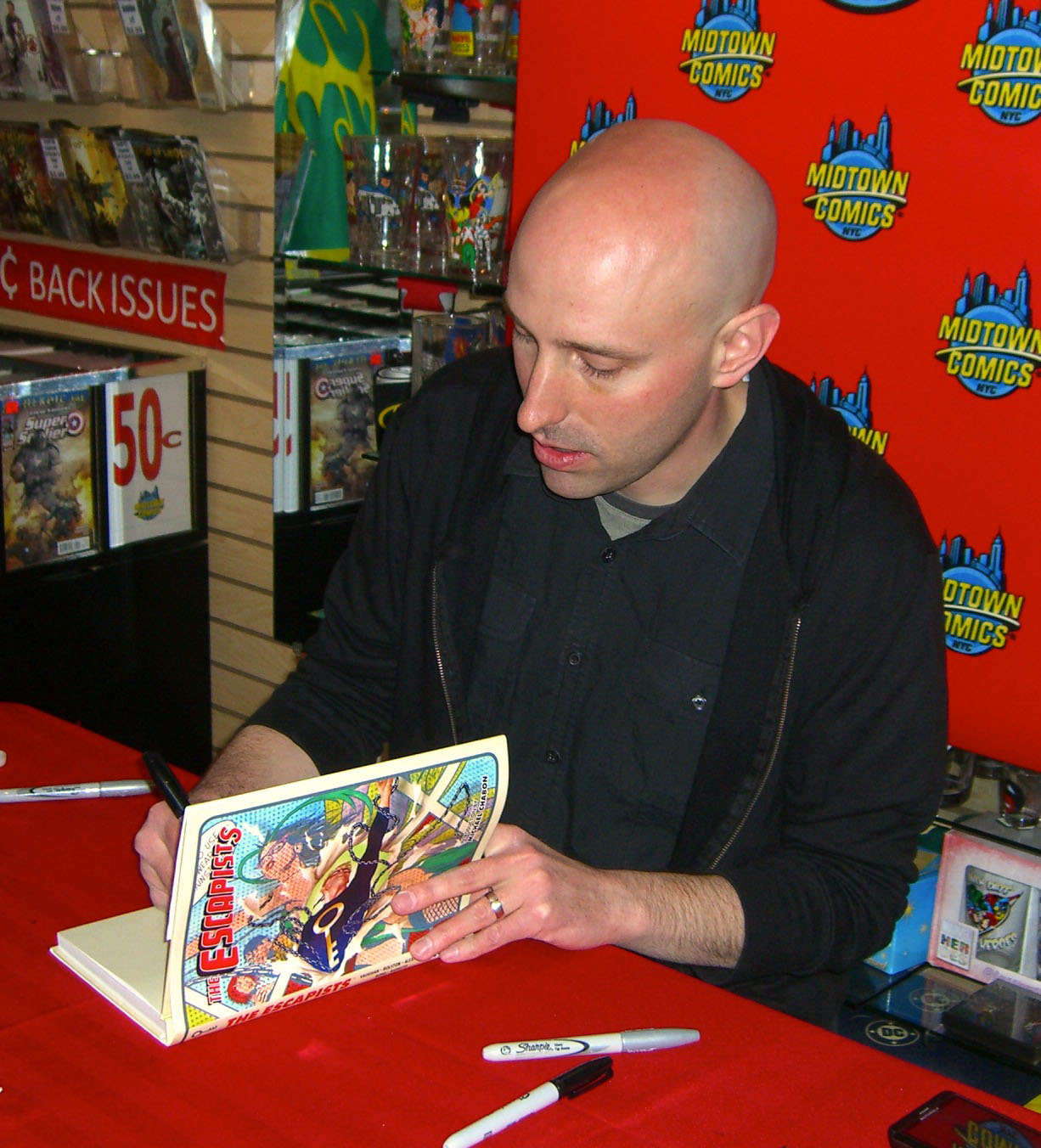
Writer Brian K. Vaughan signing a copy of the comics adaptation at Midtown Comics in Manhattan

In 2004, Chabon teamed with Dark Horse Comics to create an actual comic book series of the Escapist. Named Michael Chabon Presents the Amazing Adventures of the Escapist, the comic chronicled the supposed decades-long publishing history of the character. The stories and text pieces were written with the concept that Kavalier and Clay were real people and that the Escapist had actually been a character from the Golden Age of Comics. As such, the stories in the anthology were frequently written and drawn in older or simpler styles, in homage to the comics of past eras.

In addition to the Escapist himself, the comic featured stories of other characters supposedly created by Kavalier and Clay, such as the heroine Luna Moth and villains such as the gun-wielding Mr. Machine Gun or The Saboteur.

The comic book won "Best Anthology" at the 2005 Eisner Awards. It is also notable for featuring the final story of The Spirit by the late Will Eisner, which appeared in issue #6 of The Escapist.

In 2006, writer Brian K. Vaughan took on a 6-part miniseries titled The Escapists, which follows a longtime fan's dreams of reviving the character in all new comic adventures. Partly mirroring the story of Kavalier and Clay, The Escapists focuses on Cleveland-born Jewish writer Max Roth, whose late father was an avid Escapist fan. Using his inheritance money to buy the rights to the character, Max teams with artist Case Weaver and letterer Denny Jones, the latter of whom dresses as the Escapist and stops a crime in an attempt to stir up publicity for their comic. Inevitably, things begin to spiral out of the trio's control.

== Character history ==
The Escapist's true identity is Tom Mayflower. He is the crippled nephew of escape artist Max Mayflower (who performs under the stage name of Misterioso). When Max is fatally shot while performing onstage, he reveals that he isn't his real uncle, having rescued him from a cruel orphanage as a baby. He gives Tom a golden key and a costume, explaining that he was recruited long ago by a mysterious organization called the League of the Golden Key to fight tyranny and free the oppressed. With his dying breath, Max commissions Tom to carry on his work. As long as Tom is wearing the costume and the key, he finds that he is no longer lame of leg and can perform amazing feats of escapology. Tom uses his powers to fight crime under the guise of the Escapist, especially against the evil forces of the mysterious criminal network, the Iron Chain.

Like The Shadow, the Escapist is assisted in his quest by specially gifted agents, his sidekicks, who include the former circus strongman Big Al, exotic Asian beauty Miss Plum Blossom, and Omar, an East Indian mystic who possesses the power of hypnosis.

The Escapist is also sometimes aided by his benefactors, the League of the Golden Key, a secret society dedicated to freeing the oppressed and imprisoned. They are the source of the mystic key that grants the Escapist his powers, having granted it to Tom's uncle after freeing him from kidnappers when he was younger.

During World War II, the League makes the Escapist an emergency Champion of Freedom and grants him full access to the powers of the Golden Key. This temporarily grants the Escapist superhuman strength and agility, allowing him to openly combat the Axis forces (coinciding in the novel with Joe Kavalier's feeling of helplessness as the war continues to rage on, while he is unable to rescue his family from Nazi-occupied Europe). Following the war, the Escapist's abilities return to their original level.

In the comic-within-a-comic sequences of The Escapists, Tom's final fate is revealed, and a new Escapist takes up the mantle of the hero. Things are not quite as they appear, however.

In a story meant to embody and comment on the darker "grim and gritty" trend of modern comics, the original Escapist is said to have been killed in action, leaving a young locksmith as his successor. The new Escapist is aided by a new Luna Moth, who claims to be the original Escapist's daughter. She is soon revealed as a fraud however and betrays him to his enemies. When all seems lost, the dark and violent world fades, revealed as a dream of Tom Mayflower, still very much alive. This coincides in the "real world" with Max Roth losing the rights to the Escapist to a corporation that prefers to revert the series to its classic style.
