= Wonder Boys =

1995 novel

- First edition cover
- Author: Michael Chabon
- Language: English
- Publisher: Villard Books
- Publication date: March 14, 1995
- Publication place: United States
- Media type: Print (Hardcover, paperback)
- Pages: 368 pp (first edition, hardback)
- ISBN: 0-679-41588-2 (first edition, hardback)
- OCLC: 30895804
- Dewey Decimal: 813/.54 20
- LC Class: PS3553.H15 W66 1995

Wonder Boys is a 1995 novel by the American writer Michael Chabon. It was adapted into a film with the same title in 2000.

== Plot summary ==
Pittsburgh professor and author Grady Tripp is working on an unwieldy 2,611-page manuscript that is meant to be the follow-up to his successful, award-winning novel The Land Downstairs, which was published seven years earlier. On the eve of a college-sponsored writers' and publishers' weekend called WordFest, Tripp's wife walks out on him, and he learns that his mistress, the chancellor of the college, Sara Gaskell, is pregnant with his child. To top it all off, Tripp finds himself involved in a bizarre crime committed by one of his students, an alienated young writer named James Selwyn Leer. During a party, Leer shoots and kills the chancellor’s husband's dog, Doctor Dee, and steals his most prized Marilyn Monroe collectible: the jacket worn by the actress on the day of her marriage to Joe DiMaggio.

The book follows narrator Grady Tripp as he navigates his affair with the chancellor over the wordfest weekend, alongside his best friend and editor Terry Crabtree, as Terry romantically pursues the young talented writer James Leer.

The New York Times reviewed the novel as "...the ultimate writing-program novel. If that sounds insulting, I don't mean it to be. But anyone who has ever served time in a writing program and gone to the "writing festivals" at various universities will instantly recognize the milieu and the characters."

== Inspiration ==
The novel grew from Chabon’s concerns with completing an unrealized novel, Fountain City, about the construction of a perfect baseball park in Florida. He decided to write a story about, in part, an author who couldn’t finish his own work. The main character of Grady Tripp is admittedly based on University of Pittsburgh professor Chuck Kinder, who taught the undergraduate Chabon in the early 1980s. Kinder’s great opus, a novel inspired by his friendship with author Raymond Carver, was reportedly more than 3000 pages long at one point. It was finally published in a very slimmed-down version in 2001 as Honeymooners: A Cautionary Tale.
