= The Amazing Adventures of Kavalier & Clay =

2000 novel by Michael Chabon

- First edition cover depicts The Escapist punching Hitler in the jaw
- Author: Michael Chabon
- Language: English
- Genre: Historical fiction
- Publisher: Random House
- Publication date: September 19, 2000
- Publication place: United States
- Pages: 639
- Awards: Pulitzer Prize for Fiction
- ISBN: 0-679-45004-1
- OCLC: 234094822
- Dewey Decimal: 813/.54 21
- LC Class: PS3553.H15 A82 2000

The Amazing Adventures of Kavalier & Clay is a 2000 novel by American author Michael Chabon. A historical fiction novel, it follows the lives of two Jewish cousins, Josef "Joe" Kavalier, a Czech artist and magician who escapes Nazi-occupied Prague, and Sammy Clay, a Brooklyn-born writer. Together, they create The Escapist, a fictional superhero inspired by Joe’s desire to fight fascism and his struggle to rescue his family from Europe. In the story, Kavalier and Clay become major figures in the comics industry during its Golden Age.

The novel became a New York Times Best Seller and received "nearly unanimous praise" from critics, winning the Pulitzer Prize for Fiction in 2001.

== Plot ==
The novel opens in 1939, with the arrival of 19-year-old Josef "Joe" Kavalier as a refugee in New York City, where he comes to live with his 17-year-old cousin, Sammy Klayman in Brooklyn. Joe, trained as an escape artist, and Sammy, an aspiring writer, bond over their shared love of art and comics. Together, Joe and Sammy create the Escapist, an anti-fascist superhero that becomes hugely popular. Despite their success, their employer, Empire Novelty, reaps most of the financial rewards.

Joe is primarily concerned with rescuing his family, still trapped in Prague. As he becomes romantically involved with Rosa Saks, a bohemian with her own artistic aspirations, Joe's drive to help his family shows through in his work, which remains anti-Nazi despite his employer's concerns. Meanwhile, Sammy grapples with his sexual identity, eventually entering a secret relationship with Tracy Bacon, the handsome actor who voices the Escapist on the radio.

Joe's efforts to bring his family to the States culminate in securing passage for his younger brother Thomas on the ship The Ark of Miriam. On the eve of the attack on Pearl Harbor, however, Thomas's ship is sunk by a German U-boat. Devastated, Joe abruptly enlists in the Navy, hoping to fight the Nazis, but is instead sent to a secluded naval base in Antarctica. An obstructed chimney fills the base with carbon monoxide, leaving Joe as one of only three survivors.

Parallel to Joe's experiences leading up to the United States' entrance into the war, Tracy is cast as the Escapist for a film adaptation. The weekend before Sammy and Tracy are scheduled to leave for Hollywood they attend a private gathering of gay men at a friend's beach house on the Jersey shore, which is raided by the local police. During the raid, all the men at the party are arrested – except for Sammy and another man, who manage to hide under the dinner table. However, the off-duty FBI agents conduct a final sweep, find them both, and sexually abuse them. This leads Sammy to end his relationship with Tracy out of fear of homophobic persecution and Tracy moves to Los Angeles by himself.

Upon returning to New York, Joe avoids Rosa and Sammy, who have married and are raising Tommy, Joe's son, who was born after he left for the war. Tommy, unaware of his father's true identity, encounters Joe and begins to secretly take private magic lessons from him in the Empire State Building. This leads to a gradual reunion with Sammy and Rosa, who welcome Joe back into their lives. However, peace is disrupted when Sammy's homosexuality is publicly exposed during a Senate investigation into comic books. Despite Joe's attempts to rebuild their family (and his purchase of Empire Comics), Sammy decides to leave for Los Angeles to start a new life as a television writer, leaving Joe, Rosa, and Tommy to navigate their complex relationship.

== Inspiration ==
Many events in the novel are based on the lives of actual comic-book creators, including Jack Kirby (to whom the book is dedicated in the afterword), Bob Kane, Stan Lee, Jerry Siegel, Joe Shuster, Joe Simon, Will Eisner and Jim Steranko. Other historical figures play minor roles, including Salvador Dalí, Al Smith, Orson Welles and Fredric Wertham. The novel's period roughly mirrors that of the Golden Age of Comics itself, starting from shortly after the debut of Superman and concluding with the Kefauver Senate hearings, two events often described as marking the beginning and end of the era.

In the novel, the cover of the Escapist's debut issue shows him punching Adolf Hitler, mirroring the real-life comic book series Captain America Comics.

== Reception ==
The Amazing Adventures of Kavalier & Clay won the Pulitzer Prize for Fiction in 2001 and received widespread critical acclaim.

Bret Easton Ellis named it "one of the three great books of [his] generation", and The New York Review of Books deemed it Chabon's magnum opus. The Guardian critic Stephanie Merritt placed it "alongside the best of recent American fiction". Daniel Mendelsohn and Claude Lalumière both identified the novel as a potential Great American Novel. In The New York Times, Ken Kalfus praised the novel as "a comic epic" and "a novel of towering achievement".

The novel was featured on Entertainment Weekly's end-of-decade "best-of" list. In 2019, The Guardian ranked it 57th on its list of the best books of the 21st century, and in 2024, it placed 16th on The New York Times' 100 Best Books of the 21st Century list, with Andrew Sean Greer calling it "the century's first masterpiece".

The novel was nominated for the 2000 National Book Critics Circle Award and the 2001 PEN/Faulkner Award for Fiction.

== Adaptations ==
=== Film ===
Producer Scott Rudin bought the screen rights to The Amazing Adventures of Kavalier & Clay for Paramount Pictures based on a one-and-a-half page pitch before the novel had been published. (Rudin was involved with the novel so early on that his name appears in the acknowledgments to its first edition.) After the book was published, Chabon was hired to write the screen adaptation. In July 2002, it was reported that the process had taken 16 months and six drafts, none of which pleased Rudin.

In their 2002 "It List", Entertainment Weekly declared Kavalier & Clay the year's "It Script", publishing a short excerpt from the screenplay. While at that point, the film was in active pre-production (with Sydney Pollack attached to direct and Jude Law in talks to play Kavalier); by late 2004, Chabon had declared the film project "very much dead".

In November of that same year, though, director Stephen Daldry announced in The New York Times that he planned to direct the film "next year". In January 2005, Chabon posted on his website that "about a month ago, there was a very brief buzzing, as of a fruit fly, around the film version of The Amazing Adventures of Kavalier & Clay. It was a casting-buzz. It went like this: Tobey Maguire as Sam Clay. Jamie Bell as Joe Kavalier. Natalie Portman as Rosa Saks. It buzzed very seriously for about eleven minutes. Then it went away". Actors Andrew Garfield, Ben Whishaw, Jason Schwartzman and Ryan Gosling were also considered for parts in the project.

Jamie Caliri, director of music videos and short films, posted two and a half minutes of concept footage on his Vimeo channel, stating, "this piece was made as part of the development process... They asked me to explore animation concepts. I thought it would be much more fun to actually shoot a section of the script to intertwine live action and animation". In August 2006, however, it was reported that the film had "not been greenlit". In a 2012 interview, Benedict Cumberbatch expressed interest in starring in a possible film adaptation of the book.

=== Television ===
In a December 2011 interview, Stephen Daldry stated that he was considering making a Kavalier & Clay adaptation as a television miniseries rather than a feature film, preferring to do it "on HBO as an eight-parter... If you could put that in the article and ring up HBO and tell them that's what I wanna do, I'd really appreciate it". In 2019, CBS TV Studios signed a multi-year production pact with Chabon and his wife and writing partner Ayelet Waldman including plans to adapt the novel as a Showtime series.

=== Stage ===
In 2014, Seattle-based Book-It Repertory Theatre produced a stage adaptation written by Jeff Schwager. The production ran from June 8 to July 13, 2014, and featured a five-hour running time, including a 40-minute meal break.

=== Opera ===
In 2018, the Metropolitan Opera announced that it was in talks to co-commission an opera based on the novel with Opera Philadelphia. The Indiana University Jacobs School of Music presented the opera's world premiere in 2024, conducted by Michael Christie. Mason Bates wrote the music and Gene Scheer the libretto. The Metropolitan Opera premiere of the opera, directed by Bartlett Sher and conducted by Yannick Nézet-Séguin, was September 21, 2025. An HD video recording was made of a live performance on October 2 and played early the following year in theatres as part of the Metropolitan Opera Live in HD series.

== Printed editions ==
- U.S.: 2000, Random House, hardcover, ISBN 0-679-45004-1.
- U.S.: 2001, Picador, paperback, ISBN 0-312-28299-0.
- U.S.: 2012, Random House, paperback and e-book, ISBN 978-0-8129-8358-6. This edition includes a reader's guide and an "Odds & Ends" section containing additional pieces by the author: "Breakfast in the Wreck", "The Return of the Amazing Cavalieri", "The Crossover", and "Fifty Dollars Takes it Home".
