= Michael Chabon =

American author and Pulitzer Prize winner (born 1963)

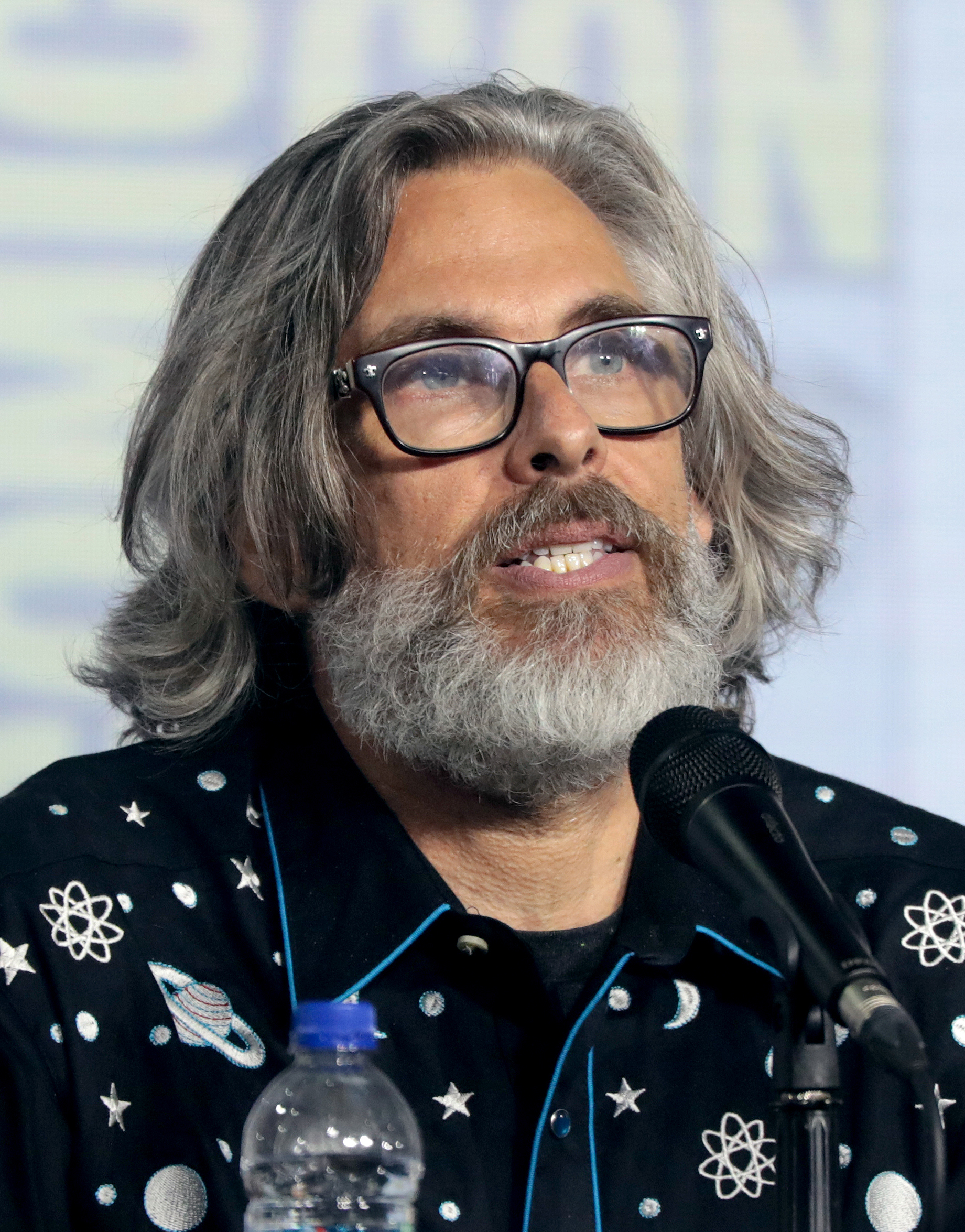
- Chabon at San Diego Comic Con in 2019
- Born: May 24, 1963 (age 63); Washington, D.C., U.S.
- Education: Carnegie Mellon University; University of Pittsburgh (BA); University of California, Irvine (MFA)
- Occupations: Novelist; screenwriter; columnist; short story writer
- Spouses: Lollie Groth (m. 1987; div. 1991) Ayelet Waldman (m. 1993)
- Children: 4
- Writing career
- Pen name: Leon Chaim Bach; Malachi B. Cohen; August Van Zorn
- Period: 1987–present
- Notable works: Wonder Boys (1995), The Amazing Adventures of Kavalier & Clay (2000), The Yiddish Policemen's Union (2007), Telegraph Avenue (2012), Moonglow: A Novel (2016)
- Notable awards: 1999 O. Henry Award; 2001 Pulitzer Prize for Fiction; 2007 Nebula Award for Best Novel; 2008 Hugo Award for Best Novel; 2008 Sidewise Award for Alternate History
- Website: Official website

Michael Chabon (/ˈʃeɪbɒn/ SHAY-bon; born May 24, 1963) is an American novelist, screenwriter, columnist, and short story writer. Born in Washington, D.C., he studied at Carnegie Mellon University for one year before transferring to the University of Pittsburgh, graduating in 1984. He subsequently received a Master of Fine Arts in creative writing from the University of California, Irvine.

Chabon's first novel, The Mysteries of Pittsburgh (1988), was published when he was 24. He followed it with Wonder Boys (1995) and two short-story collections. In 2000, he published The Amazing Adventures of Kavalier & Clay, awarded the Pulitzer Prize for Fiction in 2001; John Leonard described it as Chabon's magnum opus.

His novel The Yiddish Policemen's Union, an alternate history mystery novel, was published in 2007 and won the Hugo, Sidewise, Nebula and Ignotus awards; his serialized novel Gentlemen of the Road appeared in book form in the fall of the same year. In 2012, Chabon published Telegraph Avenue, billed as "a twenty-first century Middlemarch", concerning the tangled lives of two families in the San Francisco Bay Area in 2004. He followed Telegraph Avenue in November 2016 with his latest novel, Moonglow, a fictionalized memoir of his maternal grandfather, based on his deathbed confessions under the influence of powerful painkillers in Chabon's mother's California home in 1989.

Chabon's work is characterized by complex language, and the frequent use of metaphor along with recurring themes such as nostalgia, divorce, abandonment, fatherhood, and most notably issues of Jewish identity. He often includes gay, bisexual, and Jewish characters in his work. Since the late 1990s, he has written in increasingly diverse styles for varied outlets; he is a notable defender of the merits of genre fiction and plot-driven fiction, and, along with novels, has published screenplays, children's books, comics, and newspaper serials.

== Biography ==
=== Early life ===
Chabon was born in Washington, D.C., to an Ashkenazi Jewish family. His parents are Robert Chabon, a physician and lawyer, and Sharon Chabon, a lawyer. Chabon said he knew he wanted to be a writer when, at the age of ten, he wrote his first short story for a class assignment. When the story received an A, he recalls, "I thought to myself, 'That's it. That's what I want to do. I can do this.' And I never had any second thoughts or doubts." Referring to popular culture, he wrote of being raised "on a hearty diet of crap". His parents divorced when he was 11, and he grew up in Pittsburgh, Pennsylvania, and Columbia, Maryland. Columbia, where he lived nine months of the year with his mother, was "a progressive planned living community in which racial, economic, and religious diversity were actively fostered." He has written of his mother's marijuana use, recalling her "sometime around 1977 or so, sitting in the front seat of her friend Kathy's car, passing a little metal pipe back and forth before we went in to see a movie." He grew up hearing Yiddish spoken by his mother's parents and siblings.

Chabon attended Carnegie Mellon University for a year before transferring to the University of Pittsburgh, where he studied under Chuck Kinder and received a Bachelor of Arts in 1984. He went on to graduate school at the University of California, Irvine, where he received a Master of Fine Arts in creative writing.

=== The Mysteries of Pittsburgh and initial literary success ===
Chabon's first novel, The Mysteries of Pittsburgh, was written as his UC Irvine master's thesis. Without telling Chabon, his professor, Donald Heiney (better known by his pen name, MacDonald Harris), sent it to a literary agent, who got the author an impressive $155,000 advance on the novel, though most first-time novelists receive advances under $7,500. The Mysteries of Pittsburgh appeared in 1988 and was a bestseller, instantly catapulting Chabon to literary celebrity. Among his major literary influences in this period were Donald Barthelme, Jorge Luis Borges, Gabriel García Márquez, Raymond Chandler, John Updike, Philip Roth and F. Scott Fitzgerald. As he remarked in 2010, "I just copied the writers whose voices I was responding to, and I think that's probably the best way to learn."

Chabon was ambivalent about his newfound fame. He turned down offers to appear in a Gap ad and to be featured as one of People's "50 Most Beautiful People". He later said of the People offer, "I don't give a shit [about it] ... I only take pride in things I've actually done myself. To be praised for something like that is just weird. It just felt like somebody calling and saying, 'We want to put you in a magazine because the weather's so nice where you live.' "

In 2001, Chabon reflected on the success of his first novel, noting that while "the upside was that I was published and I got a readership," the downside was the emotional impact: "this stuff started happening and I was still like, 'Wait a minute, is my thesis done yet?' It took me a few years to catch up." In 1991, he published A Model World, a collection of short stories, many of which were previously published in The New Yorker.

=== Fountain City and Wonder Boys ===
After the success of The Mysteries of Pittsburgh, Chabon spent five years working on a second novel, Fountain City, a "highly ambitious opus ... about an architect building a perfect baseball park in Florida." It ballooned to 1,500 pages, with no end in sight. The process was frustrating for Chabon, who, in his words, "never felt like I was conceptually on steady ground."

At one point, he submitted a 672-page draft to his agent and editor, who disliked the work. Chabon had problems dropping the novel, though. "It was really scary," he said later. "I'd already signed a contract and been paid all this money. And then I'd gotten a divorce and half the money was already with my ex-wife. My instincts were telling me, 'This book is fucked. Just drop it.' But I didn't, because I thought, 'What if I have to give the money back?' " "I used to go down to my office and fantasize about all the books I could write instead." Chabon has confessed to being "careless and sloppy" when it came to his novels' plots, saying how he "again and again falls back on the same basic story."

When he finally decided to abandon Fountain City, Chabon recalls staring at his blank computer for hours before suddenly picturing "a straitlaced, troubled young man with a tendency toward melodrama, trying to end it all." He began writing, and within a couple of days had written 50 pages of what became his second novel, Wonder Boys. Chabon drew on his own experiences with Fountain City for the character of Grady Tripp, a frustrated novelist who has spent years working on an immense fourth novel. He wrote Wonder Boys in a dizzy seven-month streak, without telling his agent or publisher he'd abandoned Fountain City. The book, published in 1995, was a commercial and critical success.

In late 2010, "An annotated, four-chapter fragment" from the unfinished 1,500 page Fountain City manuscript, "complete with cautionary introduction and postscript" written by Chabon, was included in McSweeney's 36.

=== The Amazing Adventures of Kavalier & Clay ===
Among the supporters of Wonder Boys was The Washington Post critic Jonathan Yardley; however, despite declaring Chabon "the young star of American letters", Yardley argued that, in his works to that point, Chabon had been preoccupied "with fictional explorations of his own ... It is time for him to move on, to break away from the first person and explore larger worlds." Chabon later said that he took Yardley's criticism to heart, explaining, "It chimed with my own thoughts. I had bigger ambitions." In 1999 he published his second collection of short stories, Werewolves in Their Youth, which included his first published foray into genre fiction, the grim horror story "In the Black Mill".

Shortly after completing Wonder Boys, Chabon discovered a box of comic books from his childhood; a reawakened interest in comics, coupled with memories of the "lore" his Brooklyn-born father had told him about "the middle years of the twentieth century in America. ...the radio shows, politicians, movies, music, and athletes, and so forth, of that era," inspired him to begin work on a new novel. In 2000, he published The Amazing Adventures of Kavalier & Clay, an epic historical novel that charts 16 years in the lives of Sammy Clay and Joe Kavalier, two Jewish cousins who create a wildly popular series of comic books in the early 1940s, the years leading up to the entry of the U.S. into World War II. The novel received "nearly unanimous praise" and became a New York Times Best Seller, eventually winning the 2001 Pulitzer Prize for Fiction. Chabon reflected that, in writing Kavalier & Clay, "I discovered strengths I had hoped that I possessed—the ability to pull off multiple points of view, historical settings, the passage of years—but which had never been tested before."

=== Summerland, The Final Solution, Gentlemen of the Road, and The Yiddish Policemen's Union ===
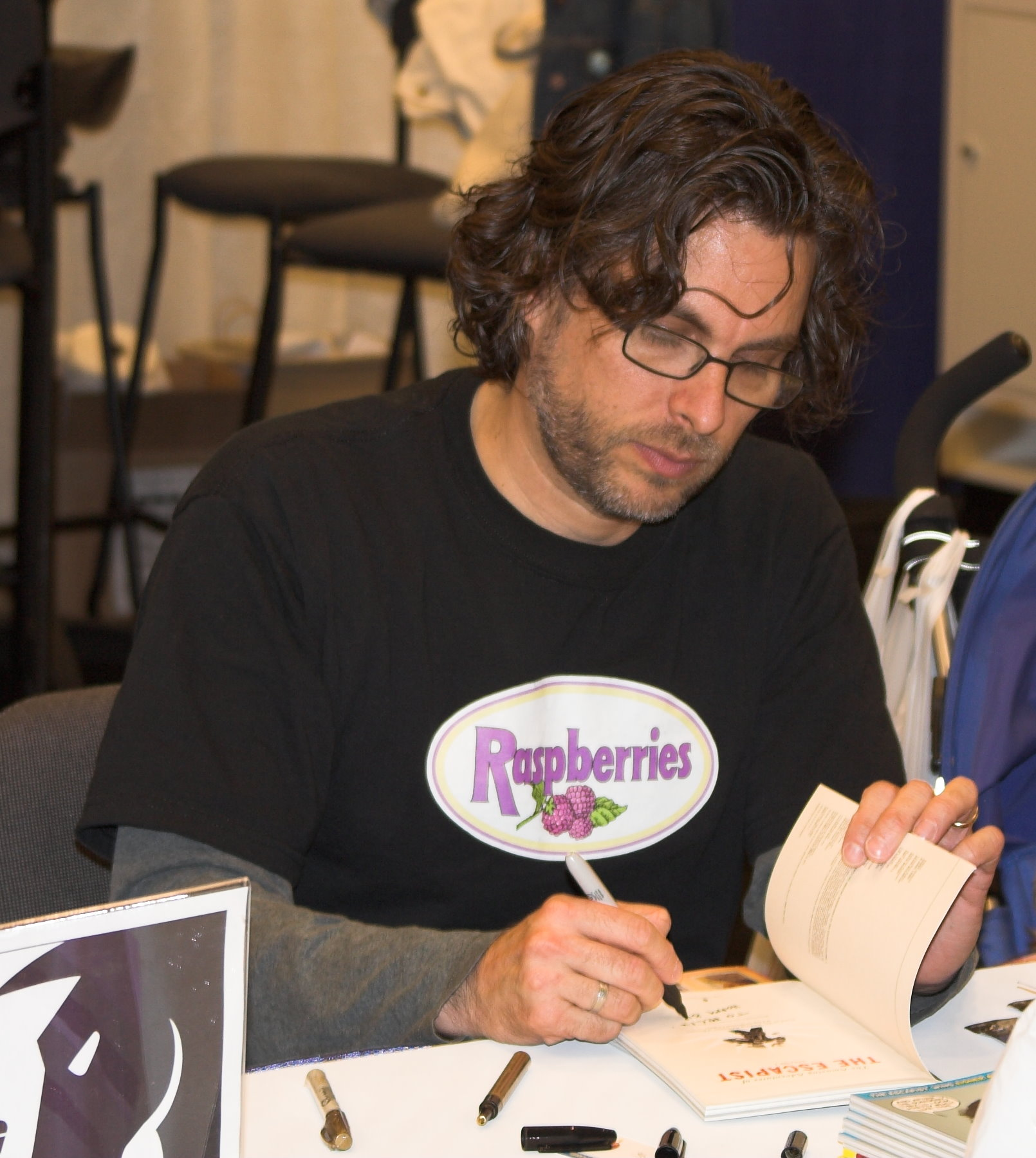
Chabon at a book signing in 2006

In 2002, Chabon published Summerland, a fantasy novel written for younger readers that received mixed reviews but sold extremely well, and won the 2003 Mythopoeic Fantasy Award. Two years later, he published The Final Solution, a novella about an investigation led by an unknown old man, whom the reader can guess to be Sherlock Holmes, during the final years of World War II. His Dark Horse Comics project The Amazing Adventures of the Escapist, a quarterly anthology series that was published from 2004 to 2006, purported to cull stories from an involved, fictitious 60-year history of the Escapist character created by the protagonists of The Amazing Adventures of Kavalier & Clay. It was awarded the 2005 Eisner Award for Best Anthology and a pair of Harvey Awards for Best Anthology and Best New Series.

In late 2006, Chabon completed work on Gentlemen of the Road, a 15-part serialized novel that ran in The New York Times Magazine from January 28 to May 6, 2007. The serial (which at one point had the working title "Jews with Swords") was described by Chabon as "a swashbuckling adventure story set around the year 1000." Just before Gentlemen of the Road completed its run, the author published his next novel, The Yiddish Policemen's Union, which he had worked on since February 2002. A hard-boiled detective story that imagines an alternate history in which Israel collapsed in 1948 and European Jews settled in Alaska, the novel was released on May 1, 2007, to enthusiastic reviews, and spent six weeks on the New York Times Best Seller list. The novel also won the 2008 Hugo Award.

=== Manhood for Amateurs and Telegraph Avenue ===
In May 2007, Chabon said that he was working on a young-adult novel with "some fantastic content." A month later, the author said he had put plans for the young-adult book on hold, and instead had signed a two-book deal with HarperCollins.

The first, a book-length work of non-fiction called Manhood for Amateurs: The Pleasures and Regrets of a Husband, Father, and Son, was published in spring 2009 (2010 in Europe); the work discusses "being a man in all its complexity—a son, a father, a husband." The collection was nominated for a 2010 Northern California Book Award in the Creative Nonfiction category. This was Chabon's second published collection of essays and non-fiction. McSweeney's published Maps and Legends, a collection of Chabon's literary essays, on May 1, 2008. Proceeds from the book benefited 826 National. Also in 2008, Chabon received the Peggy V. Helmerich Distinguished Author Award, presented annually by the Tulsa (Oklahoma) Library Trust.

During a 2007 interview with the Washington Post, Chabon discussed his second book under the contract, saying, "I would like it to be set in the present day and feel right now the urge to do something more mainstream than my recent work has been." During a Q&A session in January 2009, Chabon added that he was writing a "naturalistic" novel about two families in Berkeley. In a March 2010 interview with the Guardian newspaper, Chabon added that "So far there's no overtly genre content: it's set in the present day and has no alternate reality or anything like that."

Telegraph Avenue, adapted from an idea for a TV series pilot that Chabon was asked to write in 1999, is a social novel set on the borders between Oakland and Berkeley in the summer of 2004 that sees a "large cast of characters grapple with infidelity, fatherhood, crooked politicians, racism, nostalgia and buried secrets." Chabon said upon publication in an interview with the San Francisco Chronicle that the novel concerns "the possibility and impossibility of creating shared community spaces that attempt to transcend the limits imposed on us by our backgrounds, heritage and history." Five years in gestation, Telegraph Avenue had a difficult birth, Chabon telling the Guardian newspaper, "I got two years into the novel and got completely stymied and felt like it was an utter flop.... I had to start all over again, keeping the characters but reinventing the story completely and leaving behind almost every element." After starting out with literary realism with his first two novels and moving into genre-fiction experiments from The Amazing Adventures of Kavalier & Clay onward, Chabon feels that Telegraph Avenue is a significant "unification" of his earlier and later styles, declaring in an interview, "I could do whatever I wanted to do in this book and it would be OK even if it verged on crime fiction, even if it verged on magic realism, even if it verged on martial arts fiction.... I was open to all of that and yet I didn't have to repudiate or steer away from the naturalistic story about two families living their everyday lives and coping with pregnancy and birth and adultery and business failure and all the issues that might go into making a novel written in the genre of mainstream quote-unquote realistic fiction, that that was another genre for me now and I felt free to mix them all in a sense." The novel has been optioned by film producer Scott Rudin (who previously optioned and produced Wonder Boys), and Cameron Crowe is adapting the novel into a screenplay, according to Chabon.

In a public lecture and reading of the novel in Oakland, California, Chabon listed creative influences as broad as Sir Arthur Conan Doyle, Robert Altman, and William Faulkner.

=== Moonglow, Pops, Bookends, and current work ===
Chabon's latest novel, Moonglow, was published November 22, 2016. The novel is a quasi-metafictional memoir, based upon the deathbed confessions of Chabon's grandfather in the late 1980s.

Chabon followed-up Moonglow in summer 2017 with the edited collection Kingdom of Olives and Ash: Writers Confront the Occupation, a non-fiction collection of essays by writers concerning the ongoing Israeli occupation of the West Bank and Gaza, featuring contributions from writers including Dave Eggers, Colum McCann, and Geraldine Brooks. Chabon co-edited the volume with Ayelet Waldman, and they both contributed essays to the collection. Chabon had previously weighed in on the Israeli-Palestinian conflict in 2010, having written an op-ed piece for the New York Times in June 2010 in which he noted the role of exceptionalism in Jewish identity, in relation to the "blockheadedness" of Israel's "botching" of the Gaza flotilla raid – where nine humanitarian activists were killed – and the explanations that followed.

Pops: Fatherhood in Pieces was published in May 2018. Pops is a short non-fiction memoir/essay collection, the essays thematically linked by the rewards and challenges of various aspects of fatherhood and family.

Chabon's next non-fiction book, Bookends: Collected Intros and Outros, was published in January 2019. This volume is a collection of introductions, afterwords, and liner notes that Chabon has contributed over the years to various books and other projects, also exploring Chabon's own literary influences and ideas about writing and reading. The book serves as a fundraiser for MacDowell, to which Chabon is contributing all royalties.

In an interview with the American Booksellers Association promoting Moonglow in November 2016, Chabon stated that his next fiction project would be "...a long overdue follow-up—but not a sequel—to Summerland, my book for a somewhat younger readership. It's something I've been trying to get around to for a long time."

Despite his success, Chabon continues to perceive himself as a "failure", noting that "anyone who has ever received a bad review knows how it outlasts, by decades, the memory of a favorable word."

=== Amazon vs. Hachette controversy ===
In 2014, Amazon.com, a leading book distributor, was in a dispute with Hachette, a publisher. Hundreds of authors, Chabon included, condemned Amazon in an open letter because Amazon stopped taking pre-orders for books published by Hachette.

=== Personal life ===
After the publication of The Mysteries of Pittsburgh, Chabon was mistakenly featured in a Newsweek article on up-and-coming gay writers (Pittsburgh's protagonist has liaisons with people of both sexes). The New York Times later reported that "in some ways, [Chabon] was happy" for the magazine's error, and quoted him as saying, "I feel very lucky about all of that. It really opened up a new readership to me, and a very loyal one." In a 2002 interview, Chabon added, "If Mysteries of Pittsburgh is about anything in terms of human sexuality and identity, it's that people can't be put into categories all that easily." In "On The Mysteries of Pittsburgh", an essay he wrote for the New York Review of Books in 2005, Chabon remarked on the autobiographical events that helped inspire his first novel: "I had slept with one man whom I loved, and learned to love another man so much that it would never have occurred to me to want to sleep with him."

In 1987, Chabon married the poet Lollie Groth. According to Chabon, the popularity of The Mysteries of Pittsburgh had adverse effects; he later explained, "I was married at the time to someone else who was also a struggling writer, and the success created a gross imbalance in our careers, which was problematic." He and Groth divorced in 1991.

He married the Israeli-born writer Ayelet Waldman in 1993. They live together in Berkeley, California, with their four children. Chabon has said that the "creative free-flow" he has with Waldman inspired the relationship between Sammy Clay and Rosa Saks toward the end of The Amazing Adventures of Kavalier & Clay, and in 2007, Entertainment Weekly declared the couple "a famous—and famously in love—writing pair, like Nick and Nora Charles with word processors and not so much booze." In 2025, Chabon and Waldman's son Abraham, then a 22-year-old student at New York University, was arrested for "rape and strangulation"; the first (but not the second) charge has now been dropped.

In a 2012 interview with Guy Raz of Weekend All Things Considered, Chabon said that he writes from 10 p.m. to 3 a.m. each day, Sunday through Thursday. He tries to write 1,000 words a day. Commenting on the rigidity of his routine, Chabon said, "There have been plenty of self-destructive rebel-angel novelists over the years, but writing is about getting your work done and getting your work done every day. If you want to write novels, they take a long time, and they're big, and they have a lot of words in them.... The best environment, at least for me, is a very stable, structured kind of life."

Chabon was a vocal endorser of Barack Obama during his 2008 election campaign, and wrote an enthusiastic opinion piece on Obama for the New York Review of Books, titled "Obama & the Conquest of Denver", in October 2008. Subsequently, Chabon included a brief, fictionalized 'cameo' by Obama in his 2012 novel Telegraph Avenue.

Since 2016, Chabon has been an outspoken critic of Donald Trump, both during his campaign for the presidency (signing a petition with over 400 other writers against his candidacy in May 2016), and during his administration. During an interview with The Guardian before Trump's inauguration in January 2017, Chabon remarked of the incoming president, "I really have no idea what to expect. He's so unpredictable. He's so mercurial. You know, I would be no more surprised if he stood up there and declared amnesty for all illegal immigrants to the United States than if he said he was going to take them all out to be shot. He's like a random impulse generator." In a 2017 radio interview, Chabon spoke of Trump: "Every morning I wake up and in the seconds before I turn my phone on to see what the latest news is, I have this boundless sense of optimism and hope that this is the day that he's going to have a massive stroke, and, you know, be carted out of the White House on a gurney."

== Interest in genre fiction ==
In a 2002 essay, Chabon decried the state of modern short fiction (including his own), saying that, with rare exceptions, it consisted solely of "the contemporary, quotidian, plotless, moment-of-truth revelatory story." In an apparent reaction against these "plotless [stories] sparkling with epiphanic dew," Chabon's post-2000 work has been marked by an increased interest in genre fiction and plot. While The Amazing Adventures of Kavalier & Clay was, like The Mysteries of Pittsburgh and Wonder Boys, an essentially realistic, contemporary novel (whose plot happened to revolve around comic-book superheroes), Chabon's subsequent works—such as The Final Solution, his dabbling with comic-book writing, and the "swashbuckling adventure" of Gentlemen of the Road—have been almost exclusively devoted to mixing aspects of genre and literary fiction. Perhaps the most notable example of this is The Yiddish Policemen's Union, which won five genre awards, including the Hugo Award and Nebula Award. Chabon seeks to "annihilate" not the genres themselves, but the bias against certain genres of fiction such as fantasy, science fiction and romance.

Chabon's forays into genre fiction have met with mixed critical reaction. One science fiction short story by Chabon, "The Martian Agent", was described by a reviewer as "enough to send readers back into the cold but reliable arms of The New Yorker." Another critic wrote of the same story that it was "richly plotted, action-packed", and that "Chabon skilfully elaborates his world and draws not just on the steampunk worlds of William Gibson, Bruce Sterling and Michael Moorcock, but on alternate histories by brilliant science fiction mavericks such as Avram Davidson and Howard Waldrop. The imperial politics are craftily resonant and the story keeps us hanging on." While The Village Voice called The Final Solution "an ingenious, fully imagined work, an expert piece of literary ventriloquism, and a mash note to the beloved boys' tales of Chabon's youth," The Boston Globe wrote, "[T]he genre of the comic book is an anemic vein for novelists to mine, lest they squander their brilliance." The New York Times states that the detective story, "a genre that is by its nature so constrained, so untransgressive, seems unlikely to appeal to the real writer," but adds that "... Chabon makes good on his claim: a successful detective story need not be lacking in literary merit."

In 2005, Chabon argued against the idea that genre fiction and entertaining fiction should not appeal to "the real writer", saying that the common perception is that "Entertainment ... means junk.... [But] maybe the reason for the junkiness of so much of what pretends to entertain us is that we have accepted—indeed, we have helped to articulate—such a narrow, debased concept of entertainment.... I'd like to believe that, because I read for entertainment, and I write to entertain. Period."

One of the more positive responses to Chabon's brand of "trickster literature" appeared in Time magazine, whose critic Lev Grossman wrote that "This is literature in mid-transformation.... [T]he highbrow and the lowbrow, once kept chastely separate, are now hooking up, [and] you can almost see the future of literature coming." Grossman classed Chabon with a movement of authors similarly eager to blend literary and popular writing, including Jonathan Lethem (with whom Chabon is friends), Margaret Atwood, and Susanna Clarke.

On the other hand, in Slate in 2007, Ruth Franklin said, "Michael Chabon has spent considerable energy trying to drag the decaying corpse of genre fiction out of the shallow grave where writers of serious literature abandoned it."

=== The Van Zorn persona ===
For some of his own genre work, Chabon has forged an unusual horror/fantasy fiction persona under the name of August Van Zorn. More elaborately developed than a pseudonym, August Van Zorn is purported to be a pen name for one Albert Vetch (1899–1963). In Chabon's 1995 novel Wonder Boys, narrator Grady Tripp writes that he grew up in the same hotel as Vetch, who worked as an English professor at the (nonexistent) Coxley College and wrote hundreds of pulp stories that were "in the gothic mode, after the manner of Lovecraft ... but written in a dry, ironic, at times almost whimsical idiom." A horror-themed short story titled "In the Black Mill" was published in Playboy in June 1997 and reprinted in Chabon's 1999 story collection Werewolves in Their Youth, and was attributed to Van Zorn.

Chabon has created a comprehensive bibliography for Van Zorn, along with an equally fictional literary scholar devoted to his oeuvre named Leon Chaim Bach. Bach's now-defunct website (which existed under the auspices of Chabon's) declared Van Zorn to be, "without question, the greatest unknown horror writer of the twentieth century," and mentioned that Bach had once edited a collection of short stories by Van Zorn titled The Abominations of Plunkettsburg. (The name "Leon Chaim Bach" is an anagram of "Michael Chabon", as is "Malachi B. Cohen", the name of a fictional comics expert who wrote occasional essays about the Escapist for the character's Dark Horse Comics series.) In 2004, Chabon established the August Van Zorn Prize, "awarded to the short story that most faithfully and disturbingly embodies the tradition of the weird short story as practiced by Edgar Allan Poe and his literary descendants, among them August Van Zorn." The first recipient of the prize was Jason Roberts, whose winning story, "7C", was then included in McSweeney's Enchanted Chamber of Astonishing Stories, edited by Chabon. Roberts has gone on to win a Pulitzer Prize of his own (2025).

A scene in the film adaptation of Chabon's novel The Mysteries of Pittsburgh shows two characters in a bookstore stocking August Van Zorn books.

== The Chabon universe ==
Chabon has provided several subtle hints throughout his work that the stories he tells take place in a shared fictional universe. One recurring character, who is mentioned in three of Chabon's books but never actually appears, is Eli Drinkwater, a fictional catcher for the Pittsburgh Pirates who died abruptly after crashing his car on Mt. Nebo Road. The most detailed exposition of Drinkwater's life appears in Chabon's 1990 short story "Smoke", which is set at Drinkwater's funeral, and refers to him as "a scholarly catcher, a redoubtable batsman, and a kind, affectionate person." Drinkwater was again referred to (though not by name) in Chabon's 1995 novel Wonder Boys, in which narrator Grady Tripp explains that his sportswriter friend Happy Blackmore was hired "to ghost the autobiography of a catcher, a rising star who played for Pittsburgh and hit the sort of home runs that linger in the memory for years."

Tripp explains that Blackmore turned in an inadequate draft, his book contract was cancelled, and the catcher died shortly afterwards, "leaving nothing in Happy's notorious 'files' but the fragments and scribblings of a ghost." In Chabon's children's book Summerland (2002), it is suggested that Blackmore was eventually able to find a publisher for the biography; the character Jennifer T. mentions that she has read a book called Eli Drinkwater: A Life in Baseball, written by Happy Blackmore. Drinkwater's name may have been selected in homage to contemporary author John Crowley, whom Chabon is on the record as admiring. Crowley's novel Little, Big featured a main character named Alice Drinkwater.

There are also instances in which character surnames reappear from story to story. Cleveland Arning, a character in Chabon's 1988 debut novel, The Mysteries of Pittsburgh, is described as having come from a wealthy family, one that might be expected to be able to endow a building. Near the end of Wonder Boys (1995), it is mentioned that, on the unnamed college campus at which Grady Tripp teaches, there is a building called Arning Hall "where the English faculty kept office hours." Similarly, in Chabon's 1989 short story "A Model World", a character named Levine discovers, or rather plagiarizes, a formula for "nephokinesis" (or cloud control) that wins him respect and prominence in the meteorological field. In The Amazing Adventures of Kavalier & Clay (2000), a passing reference is made to the "massive Levine School of Applied Meteorology," ostensibly a building owned by New York University.

== Songwriting work ==
In 2014, Chabon was involved in writing lyrics for Mark Ronson's album Uptown Special. In an interview with WCBN-FM, Chabon described meeting Ronson at a party, and later being contacted to write a song. Chabon penned "Crack in the Pearl", and after growing chemistry with Ronson and Jeff Bhasker, worked on more songs for the album. One of these included the single "Daffodils", which he wrote with Kevin Parker of Tame Impala. In total, Chabon helped write 9 of the 11 songs on the album, not including mega-smash hit "Uptown Funk". He has also collaborated with Adam Schlesinger on the song "House of Broken Gingerbread" written for the Monkees' October 2018 album Christmas Party. He also co-wrote "Boxes" for Moses Sumney, and wrote for an unreleased Charlie Puth song.

Some of Chabon's musical influences include Steely Dan and Yes.

== Film and television work ==
Although Chabon once described his attitude toward Hollywood as "pre-emptive cynicism", for years the author has worked to bring both adapted and original projects to the screen. In 1994, Chabon pitched a screenplay entitled The Gentleman Host to producer Scott Rudin, a romantic comedy "about old Jewish folks on a third-rate cruise ship out of Miami." Rudin bought the project and developed it with Chabon, but it was never filmed, partly due to the release of the similarly themed film Out to Sea in 1997. In the nineties, Chabon also pitched story ideas for both the X-Men and Fantastic Four films, but was rejected.

When Rudin was adapting Wonder Boys for the screen, the author declined an offer to write the screenplay, saying he was too busy writing The Amazing Adventures of Kavalier and Clay. Directed by Curtis Hanson and starring Michael Douglas, Wonder Boys was released in 2000 to critical acclaim and financial failure. Having bought the film rights to The Amazing Adventures of Kavalier and Clay, Rudin then asked Chabon to work on that film's screenplay. Although Chabon spent 16 months in 2001 and 2002 working on the novel's film adaptation, the project has been mired in pre-production for years.

Chabon's work, however, remains popular in Hollywood, with Rudin purchasing the film rights to The Yiddish Policemen's Union, then titled Hatzeplatz, in 2002, five years before the book would be published. The same year, Miramax bought the rights to Summerland and Tales of Mystery and Imagination (a planned collection of eight genre short stories that Chabon has not yet written), each of which was optioned for a sum in the mid-six figures. Chabon also wrote a draft for 2004's Spider-Man 2, about a third of which was used in the final film. Soon after Spider-Man 2 was released, director Sam Raimi mentioned that he hoped to hire Chabon to work on the film's sequel, "if I can get him," but Chabon never worked on Spider-Man 3.

In October 2004, it was announced that Chabon was at work writing Disney's Snow and the Seven, a live-action martial arts retelling of Snow White and the Seven Dwarfs to be directed by master Hong Kong fight choreographer and director Yuen Wo Ping. In August 2006, Chabon said that he had been replaced on Snow, sarcastically explaining that the producers wanted to go in "more of a fun direction."

Although Chabon was uninvolved with the project, director Rawson Marshall Thurber shot a film adaptation of The Mysteries of Pittsburgh in fall 2006. The film, which stars Sienna Miller and Peter Sarsgaard, was released in April 2008. In February 2008, Rudin reported that a film adaptation of The Yiddish Policemen's Union was in pre-production, to be written and directed by the Coen brothers. However, as of 2018, Chabon expressed skepticism that the Coens would make the film, saying that they had effectively chosen to make A Serious Man instead, and did not wish to do another film with such similar themes.

In April 2009, Chabon confirmed he had been hired to do revisions to the script for Disney's John Carter. In July 2015, Chabon was hired to do revisions to the script for Disney's Bob the Musical.

Chabon joined the writing team of Star Trek: Picard, a new Star Trek series starring Patrick Stewart, and was named showrunner in July 2019. In November 2018, a Star Trek: Short Treks episode co-written by Chabon, titled "Calypso", was released. Another short, written only by Chabon and titled "Q&A", was released on October 5, 2019. Chabon's Star Trek series premiered on January 23, 2020, with Chabon referring to himself as a lifelong Star Trek fan. After the release of Season 1 of Star Trek: Picard, Chabon said in an interview with Variety in March 2020 that he would be involved with Season 2 of Picard, but as an executive producer rather than as showrunner.

Chabon was also listed as co-creator of the Netflix miniseries Unbelievable, and has been working on a television adaptation of Kavalier and Clay with his wife Ayelet Waldman since at least December 2019.

In April 2021, following an article in The Hollywood Reporter which alleged numerous instances of physical and emotional abuse from Rudin towards his employees, Chabon wrote a public apology, stating that he had "regularly, even routinely" heard Rudin shout at and insult staff during their twenty years of collaboration, and had once witnessed Rudin throw a pencil at an employee's head. Chabon said, "I'm ashamed. I regret, and I want to apologize for, my part in enabling Scott Rudin's abuse, simply by standing by, saying nothing, looking the other way."

== Honors ==
- 1988 Los Angeles Times Southern California Rising Star
- 1997 International Dublin Literary Award longlist (for Wonder Boys)
- 1999 O. Henry Award Third Prize (for "Son of the Wolfman")
- 2000 National Book Critics Circle Award finalist (Fiction) (for The Amazing Adventures of Kavalier & Clay)
- 2001 Pulitzer Prize for Fiction (for The Amazing Adventures of Kavalier & Clay)
- 2000 California Book Award (Fiction) (for The Amazing Adventures of Kavalier & Clay)
- 2001 PEN/Faulkner Award finalist (for The Amazing Adventures of Kavalier & Clay)
- 2002 International Dublin Literary Award longlist (for The Amazing Adventures of Kavalier & Clay)
- 2005 National Jewish Book Award for The Final Solution. A Story of Detection
- 2007 Sidewise Award for Alternate History (for The Yiddish Policemen's Union)
- 2007 Salon Book Award (for The Yiddish Policemen's Union)
- 2007 California Book Award (Fiction) (for The Yiddish Policemen's Union)
- 2008 Hugo Award for Best Novel (for The Yiddish Policemen's Union)
- 2008 Nebula Award for Best Novel (for The Yiddish Policemen's Union)
- 2009 Premio Ignotus Award for Best Foreign Novel (for The Yiddish Policemen's Union)
- 2009 International Dublin Literary Award longlist (for The Yiddish Policemen's Union)
- 2009 Entertainment Weekly "End-of-the-Decade" Best of list (for The Amazing Adventures of Kavalier & Clay)
- 2010 Northern California Book Award (General Nonfiction) nomination (for Manhood for Amateurs)
- 2010 Elected Chairman of the Board, MacDowell
- 2012 Inducted into the American Academy of Arts and Letters
- 2012 Telegraph Best Books of 2012 list (for Telegraph Avenue)
- 2012 London Evening Standard Books of the Year 2012 list (for Telegraph Avenue)
- 2012 Kansas City Star Top 100 Books of 2012 List (fiction) (for Telegraph Avenue)
- 2012 Hollywood.com Best Books of 2012 List (for Telegraph Avenue)
- 2012 New York Times 100 Notable Books of 2012 List (Fiction & Poetry) (for Telegraph Avenue)
- 2012 Good Reads Choice Awards 2012 finalist, Best Fiction (for Telegraph Avenue)
- 2013 Los Angeles Times Book Prize 2012 (fiction) finalist (for Telegraph Avenue)
- 2013 California Book Award (Fiction) finalist (for Telegraph Avenue)
- 2013 Fernanda Pivano Award for American Literature
- 2014 International Dublin Literary Award longlist (for Telegraph Avenue)
- 2017 Jewish Book Council JBC Modern Literary Achievement (citation: "For his general contribution to modern Jewish literature, including his most recent work, Moonglow, described by Jewish Book Council's committee as "a moving panorama of Jewish experience. Chabon serves up his colossal tale of darkness and light in fabulous language, as befits this modern fable.")
- 2017 National Book Critics Circle Award finalist (Fiction) (for Moonglow)
- 2017 California Book Awards Gold Prize (for Moonglow)
- 2018 International Dublin Literary Award longlist (for Moonglow)

== Works ==
- The Mysteries of Pittsburgh (1988)
- Wonder Boys (1995)
- The Amazing Adventures of Kavalier & Clay (2000)
- The Final Solution (2004)
- The Yiddish Policemen's Union (2007)
- Gentlemen of the Road (2007)
- Telegraph Avenue (2012)
- Moonglow (2016)

== Filmography ==
Film

- Spider-Man 2 (2004) (Story only)
- John Carter (2012)

Television

Year	Title	Writer	Executive producer	Creator	Notes
2018–19	Star Trek: Short Treks	Yes	No	No	2 episodes
2019	Unbelievable	Yes	Yes	Yes	2 episodes
2020–2023	Star Trek: Picard	Yes	Yes	Yes	8 episodes

== Discography ==
=== As songwriter ===
Year	Artist	Album	Song	Co-writer(s)
2017	Mark Ronson	Uptown Special	"Uptown's First Finale"	Mark Ronson and Jeff Bhasker
2017	Mark Ronson	Uptown Special	"Summer Breaking"	Ronson, Bhasker and Kevin Parker
2017	Mark Ronson	Uptown Special	"I Can't Lose"	Ronson and Bhasker
2017	Mark Ronson	Uptown Special	"Daffodils"	Parker
2017	Mark Ronson	Uptown Special	"Crack in the Pearl"	Ronson and Bhasker
2017	Mark Ronson	Uptown Special	"In Case of Fire"	Ronson, Bhasker, Nick Movshon, Alex Greenwald and Rufus Wainwright
2017	Mark Ronson	Uptown Special	"Leaving Los Feliz"	Ronson, Bhasker, Parker, Emile Haynie and Chris Vatalaro
2017	Mark Ronson	Uptown Special	"Heavy and Rolling"	Ronson, Bhasker and Andrew Wyatt
2017	Mark Ronson	Uptown Special	"Crack in the Pearl Pt. II"	Ronson and Bhasker
2018	The Monkees	Christmas Party	"House of Broken Gingerbread"	Adam Schlesinger
2020	Moses Sumney	Græ	"Boxes"	Ezra Miller, Ayesha K. Faines, Taiye Selasi and Moses Sumney

== Sources ==
- Chabon, Michael (1991). A Model World and Other Stories. New York: Avon. ISBN 0-380-71099-4.
- Chabon, Michael (1995). Wonder Boys. New York: Picador USA. ISBN 0-312-14094-0.
