= Florida Film Critics Circle Awards 2000 =

Annual US film awards ceremony

5th FFCC Awards

January 4, 2001

Best Film:
Traffic

The 5th Florida Film Critics Circle Awards, given on January 4, 2001, honored the best in film for 2000.

== Winners ==
- Best Film:
  - Traffic
- Best Director:
  - Steven Soderbergh - Erin Brockovich and Traffic
- Best Actor:
  - Geoffrey Rush - Quills
- Best Actress:
  - Ellen Burstyn - Requiem for a Dream
- Best Supporting Actor:
  - Benicio del Toro - Traffic
- Best Supporting Actress:
  - Frances McDormand - Almost Famous and Wonder Boys
- Best Cast:
  - State and Main
- Best Screenplay:
  - David Mamet - State and Main
- Best Animated Film:
  - Chicken Run
- Best Cinematography:
  - Peter Pau - Crouching Tiger, Hidden Dragon
- Best Documentary Film:
  - The Life and Times of Hank Greenberg
- Best Foreign Language Film:
  - Wo hu cang long (Crouching Tiger, Hidden dragon) - Taiwan/Hong Kong/United States/China
- Best Score:
  - O Brother, Where Art Thou?
- Pauline Kael Breakout Award:
  - Kate Hudson - Almost Famous
- Golden Orange for Outstanding Contribution to Film:
  - William Packer and Rob Hardy - for Trois and an innovative distribution plan "circumventing the usual Hollywood obstacles for African-American filmmakers.
