= Chicago Film Critics Association Awards 2000 =

Annual US film awards ceremony

13th CFCA Awards

February 26, 2001

Best Film:
Almost Famous

The 13th Chicago Film Critics Association Awards, given on 26 February 2001, honored the finest achievements in 2000 filmmaking.

== Winners ==
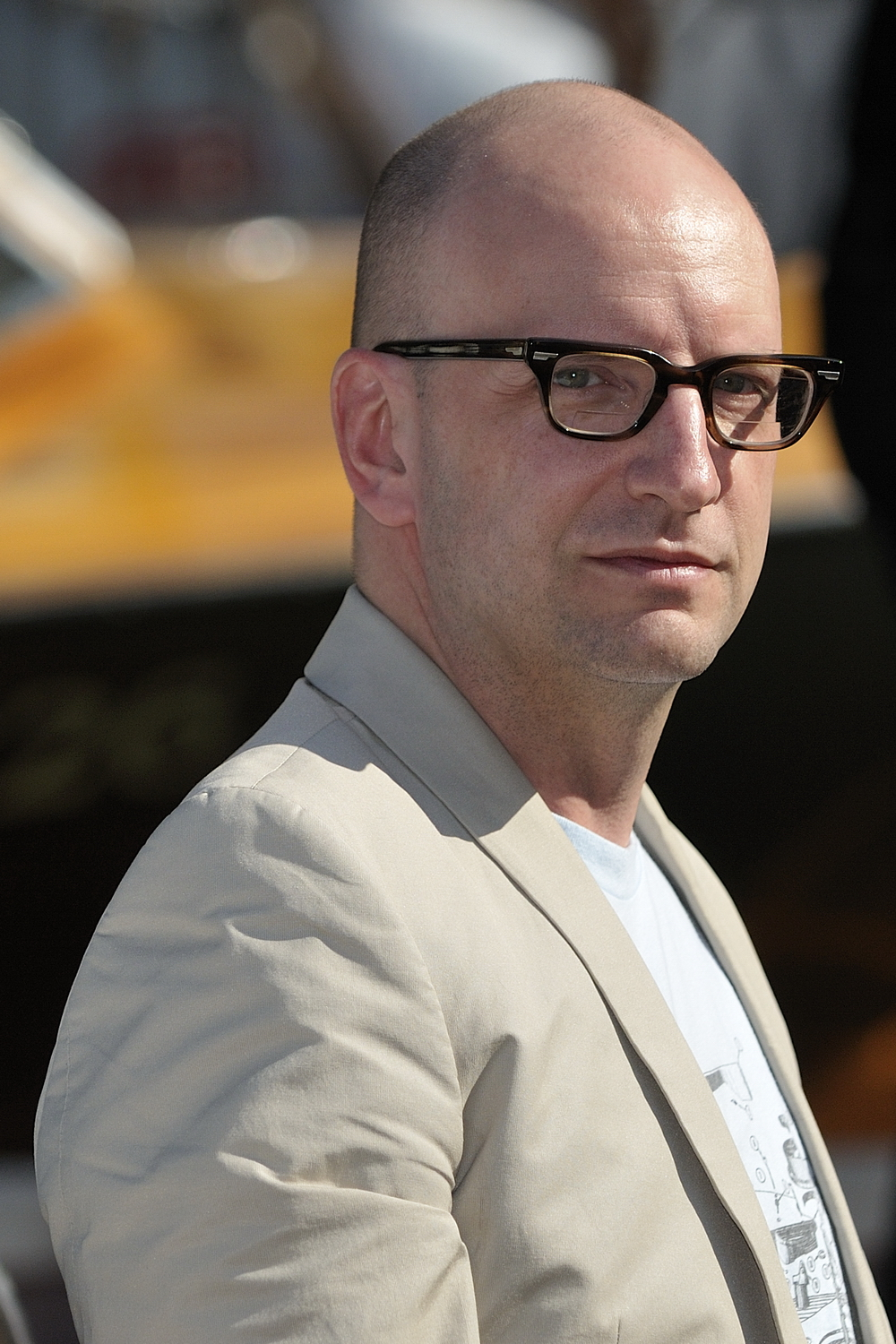
Steven Soderbergh, Best Director winner

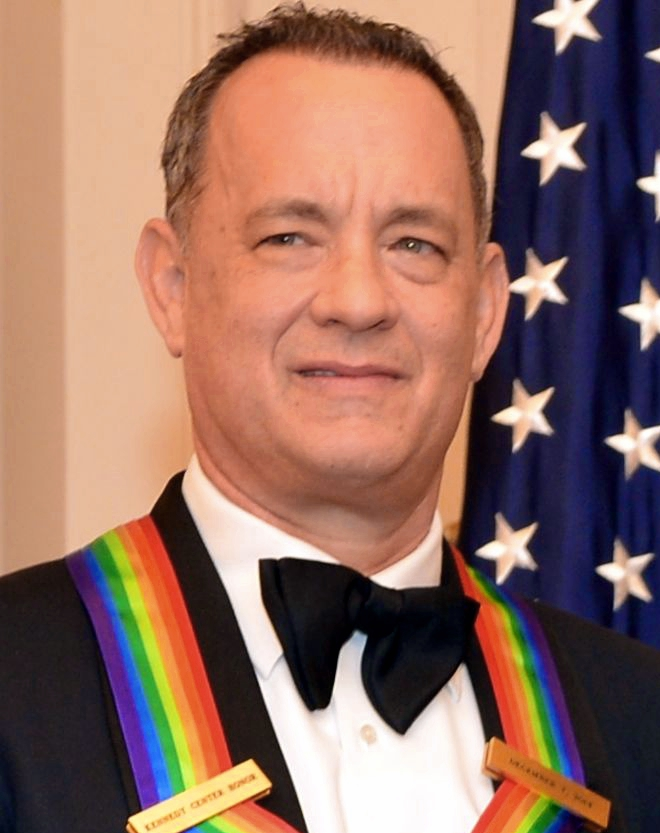
Tom Hanks, Best Actor winner

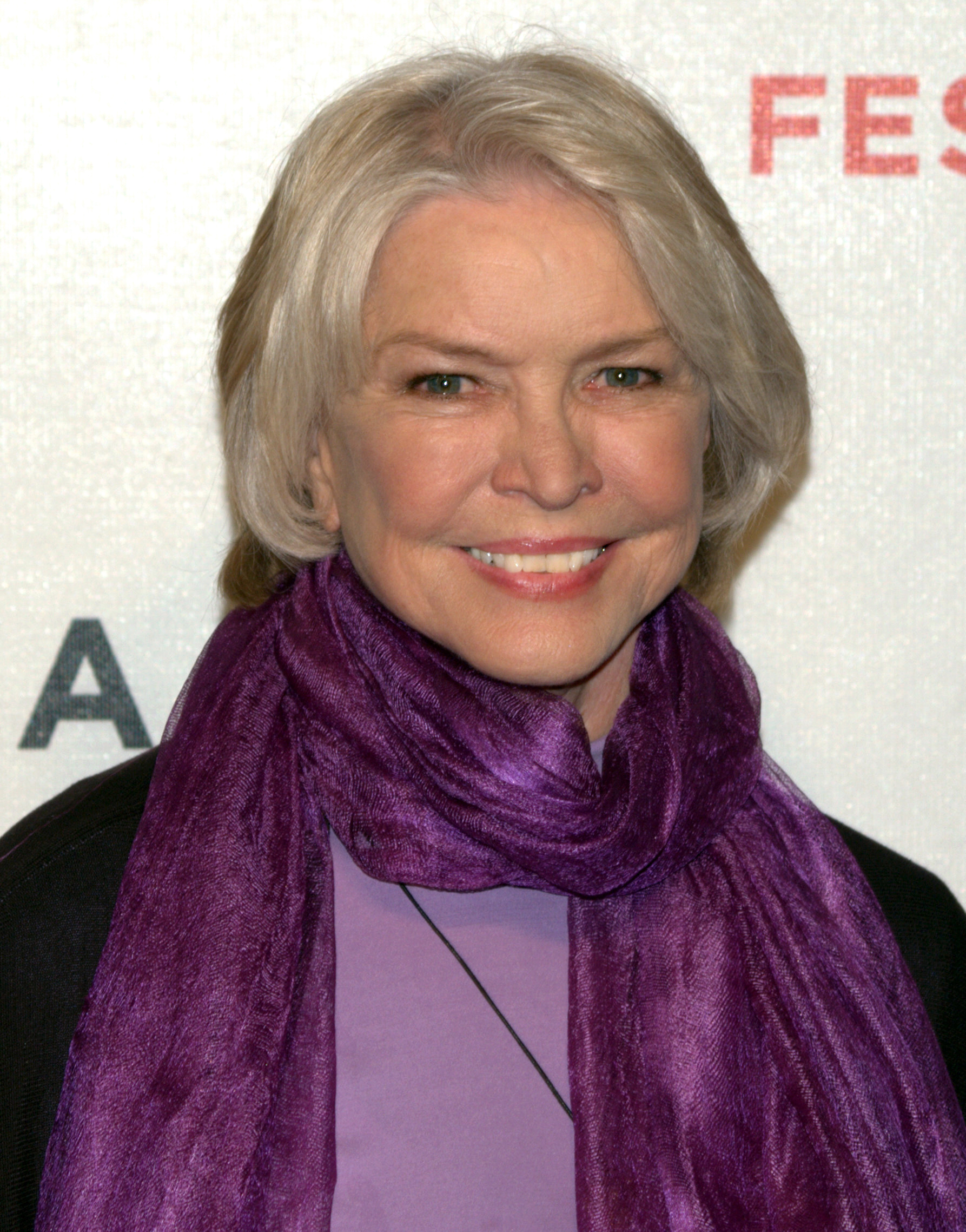
Ellen Burstyn, Best Actress winner

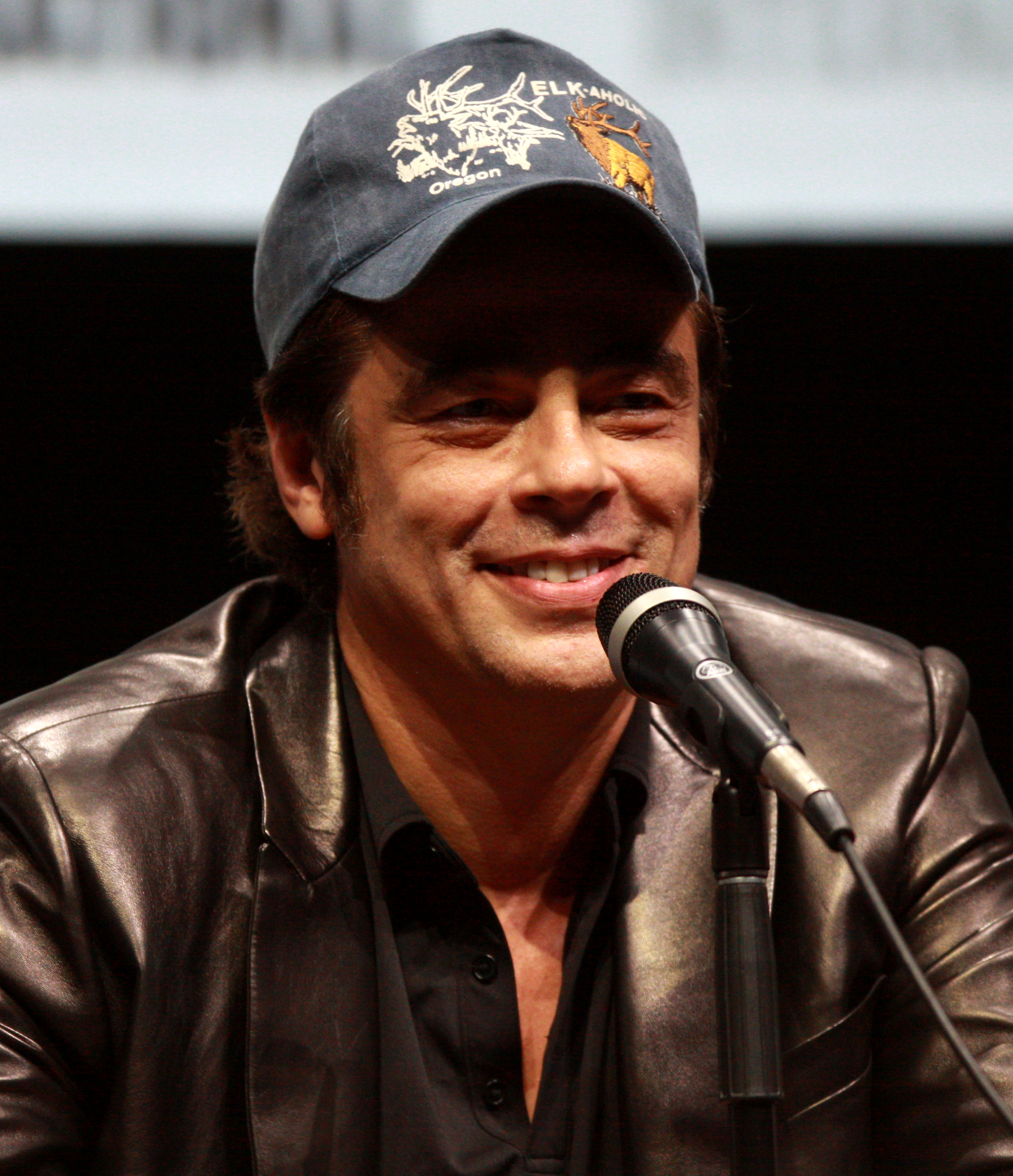
Benicio Del Toro, Best Supporting Actor winner

Frances McDormand, Best Supporting Actress winner

- Best Actor:
  - Tom Hanks - Cast Away
- Best Actress:
  - Ellen Burstyn - Requiem for a Dream
- Best Cinematography:
  - Wo hu cang long (Crouching Tiger, Hidden Dragon) - Peter Pau
- Best Director:
  - Steven Soderbergh - Traffic
- Best Film:
  - Almost Famous
- Best Foreign Language Film:
  - Wo hu cang long (Crouching Tiger, Hidden Dragon), Taiwan/Hong Kong/United States/China
- Best Score:
  - "Wo hu cang long (Crouching Tiger, Hidden Dragon)" - Tan Dun
- Best Screenplay:
  - Almost Famous - Cameron Crowe
- Best Supporting Actor:
  - Benicio del Toro - Traffic
- Best Supporting Actress:
  - Frances McDormand - Almost Famous
- Most Promising Actor:
  - Patrick Fugit
- Most Promising Actress:
  - Zhang Ziyi
- Commitment to Chicago Award:
  - Bonnie Hunt
- Big Shoulders Awards:
  - The Gene Siskel Film Center

== Nominees ==
- Best Actor:
  - Javier Bardem - Before Night Falls
  - Michael Douglas - Wonder Boys
  - Mark Ruffalo - You Can Count on Me
  - Geoffrey Rush - Quills
- Best Actress:
  - Joan Allen - The Contender
  - Björk Guðmundsdóttir - Dancer in the Dark
  - Laura Linney - You Can Count on Me
  - Julia Roberts - Erin Brockovich
- Best Director:
  - Darren Aronofsky - Requiem for a Dream
  - Cameron Crowe - Almost Famous
  - Ang Lee - Wo hu cang long (Crouching Tiger, Hidden Dragon)
  - Robert Zemeckis - Cast Away
- Best Film:
  - Wo hu cang long (Crouching Tiger, Hidden Dragon)
  - Traffic
  - Wonder Boys
  - You Can Count on Me
- Best Supporting Actor:
  - Jack Black - High Fidelity
  - Willem Dafoe - Shadow of the Vampire
  - Albert Finney - Erin Brockovich
  - Philip Seymour Hoffman - Almost Famous
- Best Supporting Actress:
  - Kate Hudson - Almost Famous
  - Julie Walters - Billy Elliot
  - Catherine Zeta-Jones - Traffic
  - Ziyi Zhang - Wo hu cang long (Crouching Tiger, Hidden Dragon)
