= Dallas–Fort Worth Film Critics Association: Top 10 Films =

Annual US film top 10

The Dallas–Fort Worth Film Critics Association: Top 10 Films is a list of 10 films selected by the Dallas–Fort Worth Film Critics Association to honor the best films of the year.

== List ==
- † = Winner of the Academy Award for Best Picture

=== 1990s ===
- 1990:
1. Dances with Wolves †
2. Goodfellas
3. Reversal of Fortune
4. The Grifters
5. Awakenings
6. Metropolitan
7. Miller's Crossing
8. Avalon
9. Edward Scissorhands
10. The Freshman
- 1991:
1. JFK
2. The Silence of the Lambs †
3. Beauty and the Beast
4. Boyz n the Hood
5. Thelma & Louise
6. Bugsy
7. Grand Canyon
8. The Fisher King
9. Barton Fink
10. The Prince of Tides

- 1992:
1. Unforgiven †
2. The Player
3. Malcolm X
4. Howards End
5. The Crying Game
6. Aladdin
7. A Few Good Men
8. Passion Fish
9. Scent of a Woman
10. A League of Their Own
- 1993:
1. Schindler's List †
2. The Piano
3. King of the Hill
4. The Remains of the Day
5. The Fugitive
6. In the Name of the Father
7. The Nightmare Before Christmas
8. The Age of Innocence
9. Philadelphia
10. Sleepless in Seattle

- 1994:
1. Pulp Fiction
2. Forrest Gump †
3. The Shawshank Redemption
4. The Lion King
5. Three Colours: Red
6. Quiz Show
7. Hoop Dreams
8. Heavenly Creatures
9. Little Women
10. Four Weddings and a Funeral
- 1995:
1. Leaving Las Vegas
2. Apollo 13
3. Babe
4. Braveheart †
5. Toy Story
6. A Little Princess
7. The Usual Suspects
8. Se7en
9. Sense and Sensibility
10. Heat

- 1996:
1. Fargo
2. Secrets & Lies
3. Hamlet
4. The English Patient †
5. Jerry Maguire
6. Shine
7. Trainspotting
8. Courage Under Fire
9. Lone Star
10. Breaking the Waves
- 1997:
1. L.A. Confidential
2. Titanic †
3. The Sweet Hereafter
4. Good Will Hunting
5. The Wings of the Dove
6. Boogie Nights
7. The Rainmaker
8. Contact
9. The Full Monty
10. As Good as It Gets

- 1998:
1. Saving Private Ryan
2. The Thin Red Line
3. The Truman Show
4. Life Is Beautiful
5. Shakespeare in Love †
6. Gods and Monsters
7. The Big Lebowski
8. Elizabeth
9. A Simple Plan
10. Out of Sight
- 1999:
1. American Beauty †
2. The Sixth Sense
3. The Iron Giant
4. The Insider
5. Toy Story 2
6. The Matrix
7. Being John Malkovich
8. Fight Club
9. Magnolia
10. The Green Mile

=== 2000s ===
- 2000:
1. Traffic
2. Crouching Tiger, Hidden Dragon
3. Gladiator †
4. O Brother, Where Art Thou?
5. Almost Famous
6. Erin Brockovich
7. Chicken Run
8. Wonder Boys
9. Finding Forrester
10. You Can Count on Me
- 2001:
1. A Beautiful Mind †
2. Moulin Rouge!
3. Memento
4. The Lord of the Rings: The Fellowship of the Ring
5. In the Bedroom
6. Shrek
7. The Man Who Wasn't There
8. Mulholland Dr.
9. Life as a House
10. Amélie

- 2002:
1. Chicago †
2. Far from Heaven
3. The Lord of the Rings: The Two Towers
4. The Pianist
5. About Schmidt
6. Gangs of New York
7. Adaptation.
8. Road to Perdition
9. Catch Me If You Can
10. The Hours
- 2003:
1. The Lord of the Rings: The Return of the King †
2. Cold Mountain
3. Mystic River
4. Lost in Translation
5. Finding Nemo
6. American Splendor
7. In America
8. Big Fish
9. Master and Commander: The Far Side of the World
10. The Last Samurai

- 2004:
1. Million Dollar Baby †
2. Sideways
3. Finding Neverland
4. The Aviator
5. Eternal Sunshine of the Spotless Mind
6. Ray
7. Kinsey
8. The Incredibles
9. A Very Long Engagement
10. Hotel Rwanda
- 2005:
1. Brokeback Mountain
2. Capote
3. Good Night, and Good Luck.
4. Crash †
5. Cinderella Man
6. Syriana
7. Pride & Prejudice
8. A History of Violence
9. King Kong
10. The Three Burials of Melquiades Estrada

- 2006:
1. United 93
2. The Departed †
3. Little Miss Sunshine
4. The Queen
5. Babel
6. Letters from Iwo Jima
7. Dreamgirls
8. Blood Diamond
9. Little Children
10. Flags of Our Fathers
- 2007:
1. No Country for Old Men †
2. Juno
3. There Will Be Blood
4. Atonement
5. Michael Clayton
6. Into the Wild
7. The Diving Bell and the Butterfly
8. The Kite Runner
9. The Assassination of Jesse James by the Coward Robert Ford
10. Charlie Wilson's War

- 2008:
1. Slumdog Millionaire †
2. Milk
3. The Dark Knight
4. The Curious Case of Benjamin Button
5. The Wrestler
6. The Visitor
7. Frost/Nixon
8. Doubt
9. WALL-E
10. Happy-Go-Lucky
- 2009:
1. Up in the Air
2. The Hurt Locker †
3. Precious
4. Up
5. An Education
6. A Serious Man
7. Inglourious Basterds
8. District 9
9. Avatar
10. Fantastic Mr. Fox

=== 2010s ===
- 2010:
1. The Social Network
2. The King's Speech †
3. Black Swan
4. 127 Hours
5. Winter's Bone
6. Inception
7. The Fighter
8. True Grit
9. The Town
10. The Kids Are All Right
- 2011:
1. The Descendants
2. The Artist †
3. Extremely Loud & Incredibly Close
4. Midnight in Paris
5. The Tree of Life
6. Hugo
7. 50/50
8. Drive
9. Shame
10. Moneyball

- 2012:
1. Lincoln
2. Argo †
3. Zero Dark Thirty
4. Life of Pi
5. Les Misérables
6. Moonrise Kingdom
7. Silver Linings Playbook
8. Skyfall
9. The Master
10. Beasts of the Southern Wild
- 2013:
1. 12 Years a Slave †
2. Gravity
3. Nebraska
4. American Hustle
5. Dallas Buyers Club
6. Her
7. The Wolf of Wall Street
8. Inside Llewyn Davis
9. Captain Phillips
10. Mud

- 2014:
1. Birdman †
2. Boyhood
3. The Imitation Game
4. The Theory of Everything
5. The Grand Budapest Hotel
6. Whiplash
7. Gone Girl
8. Selma
9. Wild
10. Nightcrawler
- 2015:
1. Spotlight †
2. The Revenant
3. Carol
4. Sicario
5. Mad Max: Fury Road
6. The Big Short
7. The Martian
8. Room
9. The Danish Girl
10. Brooklyn

- 2016:
1. Moonlight †
2. Manchester by the Sea
3. La La Land
4. Hell or High Water
5. Arrival
6. Jackie
7. Loving
8. 20th Century Women
9. Hacksaw Ridge
10. Silence
- 2017:
1. The Shape of Water †
2. The Post
3. Lady Bird
4. Call Me by Your Name
5. Get Out
6. Dunkirk
7. Three Billboards Outside Ebbing, Missouri
8. I, Tonya
9. The Florida Project
10. Darkest Hour

- 2018:
1. A Star Is Born
2. Roma
3. The Favourite
4. Vice
5. BlacKkKlansman
6. Black Panther
7. Green Book †
8. If Beale Street Could Talk
9. Eighth Grade
10. Can You Ever Forgive Me?
- 2019:
1. 1917
2. Marriage Story
3. Parasite †
4. The Irishman
5. Once Upon a Time in Hollywood
6. Jojo Rabbit
7. Little Women
8. The Farewell
9. The Two Popes
10. Knives Out

=== 2020s ===
- 2020:
1. Nomadland †
2. Promising Young Woman
3. The Trial of the Chicago 7
4. Minari
5. One Night in Miami...
6. Mank
7. Ma Rainey's Black Bottom
8. Sound of Metal
9. Da 5 Bloods
10. First Cow
- 2021:
1. The Power of the Dog
2. Belfast
3. King Richard
4. West Side Story
5. Licorice Pizza
6. Dune
7. Nightmare Alley
8. The French Dispatch
9. The Lost Daughter
10. CODA †

- 2022:
1. Everything Everywhere All at Once †
2. The Banshees of Inisherin
3. The Fabelmans
4. Tár
5. Top Gun: Maverick
6. Women Talking
7. The Whale
8. Guillermo del Toro's Pinocchio
9. Babylon
10. The Woman King
- 2023:
1. The Holdovers
2. Oppenheimer
3. Killers of the Flower Moon
4. Poor Things
5. American Fiction
6. Past Lives
7. Maestro
8. Anatomy of a Fall
9. Barbie
10. May December
