= Erin Brockovich (film) =

2000 film by Steven Soderbergh

- Theatrical release poster
- Directed by: Steven Soderbergh
- Written by: Susannah Grant
- Produced by: Danny DeVito; Michael Shamberg; Stacey Sher
- Starring: Julia Roberts; Albert Finney; Aaron Eckhart
- Cinematography: Ed Lachman
- Edited by: Anne V. Coates
- Music by: Thomas Newman
- Production companies: Universal Pictures; Columbia Pictures; Jersey Films
- Distributed by: Universal Pictures (United States and Canada); Columbia TriStar Film Distributors International (International)
- Release dates: March 14, 2000 (Los Angeles); March 17, 2000 (United States)
- Running time: 131 minutes
- Country: United States
- Language: English
- Budget: $52 million
- Box office: $256.3 million

Erin Brockovich is a 2000 American biographical legal drama film directed by Steven Soderbergh and written by Susannah Grant. The film is a dramatization of the true story of Erin Brockovich, portrayed by Julia Roberts, who initiated a legal case against the Pacific Gas and Electric Company over its culpability for the Hinkley groundwater contamination incident. Erin Brockovich premiered in Los Angeles on March 14, 2000, and was released theatrically in the United States by Universal Pictures on March 17, 2000, and internationally by Columbia TriStar Film Distributors International. It emerged as a critical and commercial success, grossing $256.3 million worldwide.

The film received five nominations at the 73rd Academy Awards, including Best Picture, Best Director, and Best Supporting Actor (Albert Finney). Roberts won Best Actress at the Academy Awards, BAFTA Awards, the Critics Choice Awards, the Golden Globes, and the SAG Awards. Additionally, the film won the Critics' Choice Movie Award for Best Director (for Soderbergh, also for Traffic) and the SAG Award for Outstanding Performance by a Male Actor in a Supporting Role (Finney).

== Plot ==
In 1993, Erin Brockovich is an unemployed single mother of three living in Los Angeles, California. After being injured in a car crash with a doctor, she files a lawsuit. Her lawyer, Ed Masry, expects to win, but Erin's abrasive courtroom behavior under cross-examination loses her the case, and Ed does not return her phone calls afterwards. One day, he arrives at work to find her in the office, apparently working. She blames him for falsely promising things would work out, and says she needs a job. Sympathizing with Erin, Ed hires her.

Erin is given files for a real estate case where the Pacific Gas and Electric Company (PG&E) is offering to purchase the home of Pete and Donna Jensen, Hinkley residents. Erin is surprised to see medical records in the file and visits Donna, who explains that she had kept all her PG&E correspondence together. Donna appreciates PG&E's help: she has had several tumors, and her husband has Hodgkin's lymphoma, but PG&E has always supplied a doctor at their own expense. Erin asks why they would do that, and Donna replies, "Because of the chromium". Erin begins digging into the case and finds evidence that the groundwater in Hinkley is seriously contaminated with carcinogenic hexavalent chromium, but PG&E has been telling Hinkley residents that they use a safer form of chromium. After several days away from the office doing this research, she is fired by Ed until he realizes she has been working the entire time and sees what she has found, and rehires her.

Erin continues her research and, over time, visits many of the community's residents and wins their trust. She finds many cases of tumors and other medical problems in Hinkley. PG&E's doctors have ostensibly handled the cluster of cases as coincidences, unrelated to any contamination. The Jensens' claim grows into a major lawsuit, but Ed and Erin lack evidence that PG&E's corporate management was involved, limiting the potential compensation.

Knowing that PG&E could slow any settlement for years through delays and appeals, Ed takes the opportunity to arrange for disposition by binding arbitration, but a large majority of the plaintiffs must agree to this. Erin returns to Hinkley and persuades all 634 plaintiffs to go along. While she is there, a man named Charles Embry approaches her to say that he and his cousin were PG&E employees, but his cousin recently died from exposure to the chromium. Embry says he was tasked with destroying documents at PG&E, but "as it turns out," he "wasn't a very good employee".

Embry gives Erin the documents, which include a 1966 memo proving corporate headquarters knew the water was contaminated with hexavalent chromium, did nothing about it, and advised the Hinkley operation to keep this secret. The judge orders PG&E to pay a $333 million settlement to be distributed among the plaintiffs.

In the aftermath, Ed hands Erin her bonus payment for the case but warns her he has changed the amount. She explodes into a complaint that she deserves more respect, but is astonished and left speechless to find that he has increased it to $2 million.

== Cast ==
- Julia Roberts as Erin Pattee/Brockovich
- Albert Finney as Edward L. Masry
- Aaron Eckhart as George, Erin's biker boyfriend
- Marg Helgenberger as Donna Jensen
- Tracey Walter as Charles Embry
- Peter Coyote as Kurt Potter
- Cherry Jones as Pamela Duncan
- Conchata Ferrell as Brenda, Mr. Masry's secretary
- Adilah Barnes as Anna, Mr. Masry's secretary
- Scarlett Pomers as Shanna Jensen
- Michael Harney as Pete Jensen
- Veanne Cox as Theresa Dallavale
- Scotty Leavenworth as Matthew Brown
- Gemmenne de la Peña as Katie Brown
- Gina Gallego as Ms. Sanchez, a PG&E attorney
- T. J. Thyne as David Foil
- Valente Rodriguez as Donald
- Jamie Harrold as Scott
- Erin Brockovich as Waitress Julia
- Edward L. Masry as Diner Patron
- Joe Chrest as Tom Robinson

== Production ==
=== Development and writing ===
The idea for the film came to be when executive producer Carla Santos Shamberg happened to learn about Erin Brockovich's story due to sharing a chiropractor with her. Santos Shamberg invited Brockovich over to her house to share her story. Of their meeting, Santos Shamberg recalled: "I couldn't believe it. It seemed incredible that this twice-divorced woman with three young children, who had no money, no resources, and no formal education, had single-handedly put this case together. I thought she seemed like the perfect role model for the new millennium."

Brockovich sold the film rights to her story in 1997 and the film began development at Jersey Films. Producers courted Callie Khouri and Paul Attanasio to write the script, but after they passed, screenwriter Susannah Grant was hired. Grant, who was looking to do a "story about a kick-ass broad", secured a meeting with Brockovich in person. Grant spent a year following Brockovich and her kids around while writing the screenplay. To ensure the script's accuracy, Grant said she spent weeks going over the trial transcripts, Hinkley water board records, and notes made by Brockovich during the investigation.

Grant and the producers were in agreement that they did not want to do a traditional courtroom drama where institutional corruption would be the heart of the story. Said Grant of the script: "I came to believe that the spine of the story would be stronger if it was an emotional spine rather than an informational spine. So I really structured it [around] Erin and Ed's relationship. Structurally, it's a love story. It's not a romantic love, obviously, but it is an interpersonal love story. That was going to give me the most freedom. There's a scene where she's explaining the degree of malfeasance on PG&E's part, and all of that is in there, but what she's really doing in that scene is proving to Ed her worth and that he should be stepping up and meeting her where she is."

After three big-name directors passed on helming the film, Jersey Films approached Steven Soderbergh, who already had a relationship with the production company due to his 1998 film Out of Sight. Soderbergh was selected to direct because he was known for being a good director of women. "I knew he would treat this character with a lot of respect and not make her silly. He did it with Jennifer Lopez [in Out of Sight] and Andie MacDowell [in Sex, Lies, and Videotape]," said Santos Shamberg. Said Soderbergh: "It's rare to find human-sized heroes, and I was just captivated by [Erin] and her relationship with Ed and the fact that it was a story about people who made certain sacrifices and stood on certain principles without being a screed." Soderbergh was also drawn to the project for the opportunity to direct a film in which the female protagonist is in every scene in the film, something he had never done before.

Santos Shamberg pictured Julia Roberts in the lead role from the outset, but producers thought her casting would be a long shot. However, the script was slipped to Roberts' agent and Roberts expressed enthusiasm in taking on the lead role and working with Soderbergh. In doing the film, Roberts became the first actress at that time to be paid $20 million.

=== Filming ===
The film was shot in 1999 over eleven weeks, of which five took place in Ventura, California. Additionally, the small town of Boron, in eastern Kern County, was primarily used as a stand in filming location for Hinkley. Richard LaGravenese did an uncredited script polish.

Brockovich herself appears in the film as a waitress, while Edward Masry appears as a diner patron sitting behind her. A judge who delivered a key ruling in the PG&E case was played by the actual judge.

The scene where a PG&E attorney is afraid to drink from a glass of water after Brockovich and Masry inform her that it came from Hinkley wells was altered for dramatic effect, but did actually take place during a trial.

A scene that was cut from the final version showed Erin becoming sick from the toxins, which happened in real life. Soderbergh excised the scene as he "didn't want people to think that this was going to turn into one of those movies where the protagonist gets terminally ill. It was a tough call, because Erin really did get sick and was hospitalized for a while."

Erin Brockovich performed well with test audiences but executives at Universal Pictures were worried that audiences would be turned off by the title character's use of profane language.

== Reception ==
=== Box office ===
Erin Brockovich was released in 2,848 theaters on March 17, 2000, and grossed $28.1 million on its opening weekend. It had the second-highest March opening weekend upon release, after Liar Liar. This was also the second-highest opening weekend for a Julia Roberts film, behind Runaway Bride. The film reached the number one spot during its first weekend, beating Mission to Mars and Final Destination. It made $18.5 million and declined by 34% for its second weekend while outgrossing Romeo Must Die, Here on Earth, and Whatever It Takes. Then, Erin Brockovich collected $13.8 million in its third weekend, dethroning The Road to El Dorado, The Skulls, and High Fidelity. Overall, it spent a total of three weeks as the number one film until it was overtaken by Rules of Engagement. The film went on to make $125.6 million in North America, making it the tenth highest-grossing film domestically for the year 2000. It grossed $130.7 million internationally for a worldwide total of $256.3 million.

=== Critical response ===
On review website Rotten Tomatoes, Erin Brockovich holds an approval rating of 87% based on 194 reviews, with an average rating of 7.8/10. The critics consensus reads, "Taking full advantage of Julia Roberts's considerable talent and appeal, Erin Brockovich overcomes a few character and plot issues to deliver a smart, thoughtful, and funny legal drama." On Metacritic, the film has a weighted score of 73 out of 100 based on 37 critics, indicating "generally favorable reviews". Audiences polled by CinemaScore gave the film an average grade of "A" on an A+ to F scale.

In his review for The New York Observer, Andrew Sarris wrote, "We get the best of independent cinema and the best of mainstream cinema all in one package. Erin Brockovich, like Wonder Boys right before it, makes the year 2000 seem increasingly promising for movies". Newsweek's David Ansen began his review with, "Julia Roberts is flat-out terrific in Erin Brockovich." Furthermore, he wrote, "Roberts has wasted her effervescence on many paltry projects, but she hits the jackpot this time. Erin, single mother of three, a former Miss Wichita who improbably rallies a community to take on a multi-billion-dollar corporation, is the richest role of her career, simultaneously showing off her comic, dramatic and romantic chops". Rolling Stone's Peter Travers wrote, "Roberts shows the emotional toll on Erin as she tries to stay responsible to her children and to a job that has provided her with a first taste of self-esteem". Robert Philpot of Fort Worth Star-Telegram gave it a three-and-a-half out of four rating, describing it as "a movie that uses a wicked sense of humor to examine serious themes. It's the kind of David-vs.-Goliath story told in The Insider and A Civil Action, but it drops the self-importance of those movies and replaces it with a refreshingly feisty attitude". In his review for Entertainment Weekly, Owen Gleiberman gave the film a "B+" rating and wrote, "It's a delight to watch Roberts, with her flirtatious sparkle and undertow of melancholy, ricochet off Finney's wonderfully jaded, dry-as-beef-jerky performance as the beleaguered career attorney who knows too much about the loopholes of his profession to have much faith left in it". Sight & Sound's Andrew O'Hehir wrote, "Perhaps the best thing about this relaxed and supremely engaging film (for my money the best work either the director or his star has ever done) is that even its near-fairytale resolution doesn't offer a magical transformation". Donald Munro of Fresno Bee gave it a "B+" rating and said, "We've indulged in the bash-the-big-bad-corporation genre before with such upstanding films as Silkwood, Norma Rae and A Civil Action -- but never have we had such rollicking fun doing it". In her review for The Village Voice, Amy Taubin wrote, "What's pretty original about the picture is that it focuses an investigative drama based on a true story around a comic performance".

However, film critic Roger Ebert gave the film a two-star review, writing, "There is obviously a story here, but Erin Brockovich doesn't make it compelling. The film lacks focus and energy, the character development is facile and thin". In his review for The New York Times, A.O. Scott wrote, "After proving, for about 40 minutes, what a marvelous actress she can be, Ms. Roberts spends the next 90 content to be a movie star. As the movie drags on, her performance swells to bursting with moral vanity and phony populism". Time's Richard Corliss found the film to be "slick, grating and false. We bet it makes a bundle".

Writing about the film for its twentieth anniversary, critic Scott Tobias wrote in The Guardian, "With this film and Traffic the same year, Soderbergh would prove to be a master at connecting the dots without making it seem like an information dump. In Erin Brockovich, Roberts is the spoonful of sugar that makes the medicine go down: as we learn about different types of chromium, the range of medical abnormalities, and the ins and outs of real estate documents and toxicology reports, she's ripping some poor suit with invective or using her body as a diversionary tactic. It never feels difficult to sort through the facts – and, more crucially, the emotional stakes of the case are never lost in them. That's Brockovich's gift. And that's Roberts', too."

=== Accolades ===
Julia Roberts became the first actress to win an Academy Award, BAFTA Award, Critics' Choice Movie Award, Golden Globe Award, National Board of Review Award, and Screen Actors Guild Award for a single performance.

Steven Soderbergh received dual nominations for Best Director that year for both Erin Brockovich and Traffic, winning the award for the latter. In 2021, members of Writers Guild of America West (WGAW) and Writers Guild of America, East (WGAE) voted the film's screenplay 78th in WGA's 101 Greatest Screenplays of the 21st Century (so far).

Award	Category	Nominee(s)	Result	Ref.
Academy Awards	Best Picture	Danny DeVito, Michael Shamberg and Stacey Sher	Nominated	
Academy Awards	Best Director	Steven Soderbergh	Nominated	
Academy Awards	Best Actress	Julia Roberts	Won	
Academy Awards	Best Supporting Actor	Albert Finney	Nominated	
Academy Awards	Best Original Screenplay	Susannah Grant	Nominated	
Amanda Awards	Best Foreign Feature Film	Steven Soderbergh	Nominated	
American Film Institute Awards	Top 10 Movies of the Year		Won	
Artios Awards	Outstanding Achievement in Feature Film Casting – Drama	Margery Simkin	Nominated	
Awards Circuit Community Awards	Best Actress in a Leading Role	Julia Roberts	Runner-up	
Awards Circuit Community Awards	Best Actor in a Supporting Role	Albert Finney	Won	
Blockbuster Entertainment Awards	Favorite Actress – Drama	Julia Roberts	Won	
Blockbuster Entertainment Awards	Favorite Supporting Actor – Drama	Albert Finney	Nominated	
Blockbuster Entertainment Awards	Favorite Supporting Actress – Drama	Marg Helgenberger	Nominated	
BMI Film & TV Awards	Film Music Award	Thomas Newman	Won	
Bogey Awards			Won	
Boston Society of Film Critics Awards	Best Film		3rd Place	
Boston Society of Film Critics Awards	Best Director	Steven Soderbergh	3rd Place	
Boston Society of Film Critics Awards	Best Actress	Julia Roberts	3rd Place	
Boston Society of Film Critics Awards	Best Supporting Actor	Albert Finney	3rd Place	
British Academy Film Awards	Best Film	Danny DeVito, Michael Shamberg and Stacey Sher	Nominated	
British Academy Film Awards	Best Direction	Steven Soderbergh	Nominated	
British Academy Film Awards	Best Actress in a Leading Role	Julia Roberts	Won	
British Academy Film Awards	Best Actor in a Supporting Role	Albert Finney	Nominated	
British Academy Film Awards	Best Original Screenplay	Susannah Grant	Nominated	
British Academy Film Awards	Best Editing	Anne V. Coates	Nominated	
Chicago Film Critics Association Awards	Best Actress	Julia Roberts	Nominated	
Chicago Film Critics Association Awards	Best Supporting Actor	Albert Finney	Nominated	
Chlotrudis Awards	Best Supporting Actor	Albert Finney	Nominated	
Costume Designers Guild Awards	Excellence in Contemporary Film	Jeffrey Kurland	Won	
Critics' Choice Movie Awards	Top 10 Films		Won	
Critics' Choice Movie Awards	Best Picture		Nominated	
Critics' Choice Movie Awards	Best Director	Steven Soderbergh (also for Traffic)	Won	
Critics' Choice Movie Awards	Best Actress	Julia Roberts	Won	
Dallas-Fort Worth Film Critics Association Awards	Top 10 Films		6th Place	
Dallas-Fort Worth Film Critics Association Awards	Best Film		Nominated	
Dallas-Fort Worth Film Critics Association Awards	Best Actress	Julia Roberts	Nominated	
Dallas-Fort Worth Film Critics Association Awards	Best Supporting Actor	Albert Finney	Won	
Directors Guild of America Awards	Outstanding Directorial Achievement in Motion Pictures	Steven Soderbergh	Nominated	
Edgar Allan Poe Awards	Best Motion Picture	Susannah Grant	Nominated	
Empire Awards	Best Actress	Julia Roberts	Nominated	
Environmental Media Awards	Feature Film		Won	
European Film Awards	Screen International Award		Nominated	
Florida Film Critics Circle Awards	Best Director	Steven Soderbergh (also for Traffic)	Won	
Golden Globe Awards	Best Motion Picture – Drama		Nominated	
Golden Globe Awards	Best Actress in a Motion Picture – Drama	Julia Roberts	Won	
Golden Globe Awards	Best Supporting Actor – Motion Picture	Albert Finney	Nominated	
Golden Globe Awards	Best Director – Motion Picture	Steven Soderbergh	Nominated	
Golden Reel Awards	Best Sound Editing – Dialogue & ADR, Domestic Feature Film	Larry Blake and Aaron Glascock	Nominated	
Golden Reel Awards	Best Sound Editing – Sound Effects & Foley, Domestic Feature Film	Michael Keller	Nominated	
Jupiter Awards	Best International Actress	Julia Roberts	Won	
Las Vegas Film Critics Society Awards	Best Picture		Won	
Las Vegas Film Critics Society Awards	Best Director	Steven Soderbergh (also for Traffic)	Won	
Las Vegas Film Critics Society Awards	Best Actress	Julia Roberts	Nominated	
Las Vegas Film Critics Society Awards	Best Supporting Actor	Albert Finney	Nominated	
Las Vegas Film Critics Society Awards	Best Original Screenplay	Susannah Grant and Richard LaGravenese	Won	
London Film Critics Circle Awards	Director of the Year	Steven Soderbergh	Nominated	
London Film Critics Circle Awards	Actress of the Year	Julia Roberts	Won	
London Film Critics Circle Awards	British Supporting Actor of the Year	Albert Finney	Won	
Los Angeles Film Critics Association Awards	Best Director	Steven Soderbergh (also for Traffic)	Won	
Los Angeles Film Critics Association Awards	Best Actress	Julia Roberts	Won	
Make-Up Artists and Hair Stylists Guild Awards	Best Contemporary Hair Styling in a Feature-Length Motion Picture		Nominated	
MTV Movie Awards	Best Movie		Nominated	
MTV Movie Awards	Best Female Performance	Julia Roberts	Won	
MTV Movie Awards	Best Line	"Bite My Ass, Krispy Kreme"	Nominated	
National Board of Review Awards	Best Director	Steven Soderbergh (also for Traffic)	Won	
National Board of Review Awards	Best Actress	Julia Roberts	Won	
National Festival of Dubbing Voices in the Shadow	Best Female Voice (Film Award)	Cristina Boraschi (for dubbing Julia Roberts)	Nominated	
National Festival of Dubbing Voices in the Shadow	Best Female Voice (Audience Award)	Cristina Boraschi (for dubbing Julia Roberts)	Won	
National Society of Film Critics Awards	Best Director	Steven Soderbergh (also for Traffic)	Won	
New York Film Critics Circle Awards	Best Director	Steven Soderbergh (also for Traffic)	Won	
Online Film & Television Association Awards	Best Picture	Danny DeVito, Michael Shamberg and Stacey Sher	Nominated	
Online Film & Television Association Awards	Best Director	Steven Soderbergh	Nominated	
Online Film & Television Association Awards	Best Actress	Julia Roberts	Nominated	
Online Film & Television Association Awards	Best Supporting Actor	Albert Finney	Nominated	
Online Film & Television Association Awards	Best Original Screenplay	Susannah Grant	Nominated	
Online Film & Television Association Awards	Best Film Editing	Anne V. Coates	Nominated	
Online Film Critics Society Awards	Top 10 Films		10th Place	
Online Film Critics Society Awards	Best Actress	Julia Roberts	Nominated	
Online Film Critics Society Awards	Best Supporting Actor	Albert Finney	Nominated	
PEN Center USA West Literary Awards	Best Screenplay	Susannah Grant	Nominated	
Producers Guild of America Awards	Outstanding Producer of Theatrical Motion Pictures	Danny DeVito, Michael Shamberg and Stacey Sher	Nominated	
Political Film Society Awards	Exposé		Nominated	
Political Film Society Awards	Human Rights		Nominated	
San Diego Film Critics Society Awards	Best Actress	Julia Roberts	Won (Note: Tied with Laura Linney for You Can Count on Me.)	
Satellite Awards	Best Motion Picture – Drama		Nominated	
Satellite Awards	Best Director	Steven Soderbergh	Nominated	
Satellite Awards	Best Actress in a Motion Picture – Drama	Julia Roberts	Nominated	
Satellite Awards	Best Supporting Actor in a Motion Picture – Drama	Albert Finney	Nominated	
Satellite Awards	Best Original Screenplay	Susannah Grant	Nominated	
Screen Actors Guild Awards	Outstanding Performance by a Female Actor in a Leading Role	Julia Roberts	Won	
Screen Actors Guild Awards	Outstanding Performance by a Male Actor in a Supporting Role	Albert Finney	Won	
Southeastern Film Critics Association Awards	Best Picture		9th Place	
Teen Choice Awards	Choice Movie Actress	Julia Roberts	Won	
Writers Guild of America Awards	Best Screenplay – Written Directly for the Screen	Susannah Grant	Nominated	

American Film Institute recognition:

- AFI's 100 Years...100 Heroes & Villains:
  - Erin Brockovich – Hero No. 31
- AFI's 100 Years...100 Cheers – No. 73

== Home media ==
The film was released on VHS and DVD on August 15, 2000.

A Blu-ray version debuted on June 5, 2012. This was followed by a 4K Blu-ray on August 26, 2025.

== Accuracy ==
On her website, Brockovich says the film is "probably 98% accurate". While the general facts of the story are accurate, there are some minor discrepancies between actual events and the movie, as well as a number of controversial and disputed issues more fundamental to the case. In the film, Erin Brockovich appears to deliberately use her cleavage to seduce the water board attendant to allow her to access the documents. Brockovich has acknowledged that her cleavage may have had an influence, but denies consciously trying to influence individuals in this way. In the film, Ed Masry represents Erin Brockovich in the car crash case. In reality, it was his law partner, Jim Vititoe. Brockovich had never been Miss Wichita; she had been Miss Pacific Coast. According to Brockovich, this detail was deliberately changed by Soderbergh as he thought it was "cute" to have her be beauty queen of the region from which she came. The "not so good employee" who met Brockovich in the bar was Chuck Ebersohl. He told Erin about the documents that he and Lillian Melendez had been tasked by PG&E to destroy.

George Halaby, played by Aaron Eckhart in the film, along with Brockovich's ex-husband Shawn Brown, alleged that she had an affair with Masry. They tried to extort $310,000 out of them by threatening to go public about the affair. Halaby was arrested and the lawyer John Jeffrey Reiner was suspended from practicing, convicted of extortion, and later disbarred.

== See also ==
- Dark Waters (2019 film)

== Works cited ==
- Cohen, David S. (2008). Screen Plays: How 25 Screenplays Made It to a Theater Near You—For Better or Worse. Harper. ISBN 978-0-0614-3157-9.
