= Online Film Critics Society Awards 2000 =

4th Online Film Critics Society Awards

4th Online Film Critics Society Awards

January 2, 2001

Best Film:
Almost Famous

The 4th Online Film Critics Society Awards, honoring the best in film for 2000, were given on 2 January 2001.

== Top 10 films ==
1. Almost Famous
2. Requiem for a Dream
3. Wo hu cang long (Crouching Tiger, Hidden Dragon)
4. Dancer in the Dark
5. Traffic
6. Gladiator
7. Quills
8. Wonder Boys
9. Chicken Run
10. Erin Brockovich

== Winners and nominees ==
=== Best Picture ===
Almost Famous

- Crouching Tiger, Hidden Dragon
- Dancer in the Dark
- Requiem for a Dream
- Traffic

=== Best Director ===
Darren Aronofsky – Requiem for a Dream

- Cameron Crowe – Almost Famous
- Ang Lee – Crouching Tiger, Hidden Dragon
- Steven Soderbergh – Traffic
- Lars von Trier – Dancer in the Dark

=== Best Actor ===
Tom Hanks – Cast Away

- Christian Bale – American Psycho
- Russell Crowe – Gladiator
- Michael Douglas – Wonder Boys
- Geoffrey Rush – Quills

=== Best Actress ===
Ellen Burstyn – Requiem for a Dream

- Joan Allen – The Contender
- Björk – Dancer in the Dark
- Laura Linney – You Can Count on Me
- Julia Roberts – Erin Brockovich

=== Best Supporting Actor ===
Benicio del Toro – Traffic
Philip Seymour Hoffman – Almost Famous

- Jack Black – High Fidelity
- Willem Dafoe – Shadow of the Vampire
- Albert Finney – Erin Brockovich
- Joaquin Phoenix – Gladiator

=== Best Supporting Actress ===
Kate Hudson – Almost Famous

- Jennifer Connelly – Requiem for a Dream
- Elaine May – Small Time Crooks
- Frances McDormand – Almost Famous
- Zhang Ziyi – Crouching Tiger, Hidden Dragon

=== Best Screenplay ===
Almost Famous – Cameron Crowe

- Quills – Doug Wright
- State and Main – David Mamet
- Traffic – Stephen Gaghan
- Wonder Boys – Steve Kloves
- You Can Count on Me – Kenneth Lonergan

=== Best Foreign Language Film ===
Crouching Tiger, Hidden Dragon

- The Color of Paradise
- Girl on the Bridge
- Shower
- Yi Yi

=== Best Documentary ===
The Filth and the Fury

- Dark Days
- The Eyes of Tammy Faye
- The Life and Times of Hank Greenberg
- One Day in September

=== Best Cinematography ===
Crouching Tiger, Hidden Dragon – Peter Pau

- Gladiator – John Mathieson
- O Brother, Where Art Thou? – Roger Deakins
- Requiem for a Dream – Matthew Libatique
- Traffic – Steven Soderbergh

=== Best Editing ===
Requiem for a Dream – Jay Rabinowitz

- Crouching Tiger, Hidden Dragon – Tim Squyres
- Dancer in the Dark – François Gédigier and Molly Marlene Stensgård
- Gladiator – Pietro Scalia
- Traffic – Stephen Mirrione

=== Best Ensemble ===
Almost Famous
State and Main

- Requiem for a Dream
- Traffic
- Wonder Boys

=== Best Original Score ===
Requiem for a Dream – Clint Mansell

- Crouching Tiger, Hidden Dragon – Tan Dun
- Dancer in the Dark – Björk
- Gladiator – Hans Zimmer, Lisa Gerrard and Klaus Badelt
- O Brother, Where Art Thou? – T-Bone Burnett and Carter Burwell

=== Best DVD ===
Fight Club

- Gladiator
- Magnolia
- Seven: New Line Platinum Series Edition
- Toy Story: Ultimate Toy Box Edition

=== Best DVD Special Features ===
Fight Club

- Seven: New Line Platinum Series Edition
- Terminator 2: Judgment Day: The Ultimate Edition
- Toy Story: Ultimate Toy Box Edition

=== Best DVD Commentary ===
Fight Club

- Gladiator
- The Limey
- Seven: New Line Platinum Series Edition
- Three Kings

=== Best Cinematic Debut/Breakthrough ===
Björk – Dancer in the Dark

- Jamie Bell – Billy Elliot
- Patrick Fugit – Almost Famous
- Kate Hudson – Almost Famous
- Michelle Rodriguez – Girlfight
