= San Diego Film Critics Society Awards 2000 =

Annual US film awards ceremony

5th SDFCS Awards

December 20, 2000

Best Film:
Almost Famous

The 5th San Diego Film Critics Society Awards, given by the San Diego Film Critics Society on December 20, 2000, honored the best in film for 2000.

== Winners ==
- Best Actor:
  - Russell Crowe – Gladiator
- Best Actress (tie):
  - Laura Linney – You Can Count on Me
  - Julia Roberts – Erin Brockovich
- Best Cinematography:
  - Gladiator – John Mathieson
- Best Director:
  - Cameron Crowe – Almost Famous
- Best Film:
  - Almost Famous
- Best Foreign Language Film:
  - The Colour of Paradise (Rang-e khoda) • Iran
- Best Screenplay – Adapted:
  - Chocolat - Robert Nelson Jacobs
- Best Screenplay – Original:
  - Almost Famous - Cameron Crowe
- Best Supporting Actor:
  - Benicio del Toro – Traffic
- Best Supporting Actress:
  - Frances McDormand – Almost Famous
- Body of Work Award:
  - Joaquin Phoenix – Gladiator, Quills and The Yards
