= Boston Society of Film Critics Awards 2000 =

Annual US film awards ceremony

21st BSFC Awards

December 17, 2000

Best Film:
Almost Famous

The 21st Boston Society of Film Critics Awards honored the best in film of 2000.

== Winners ==
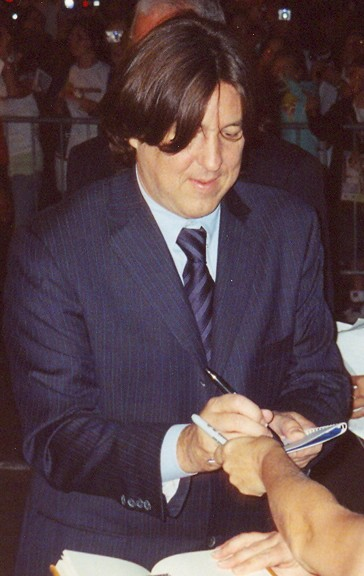
Cameron Crowe, Best Director winner

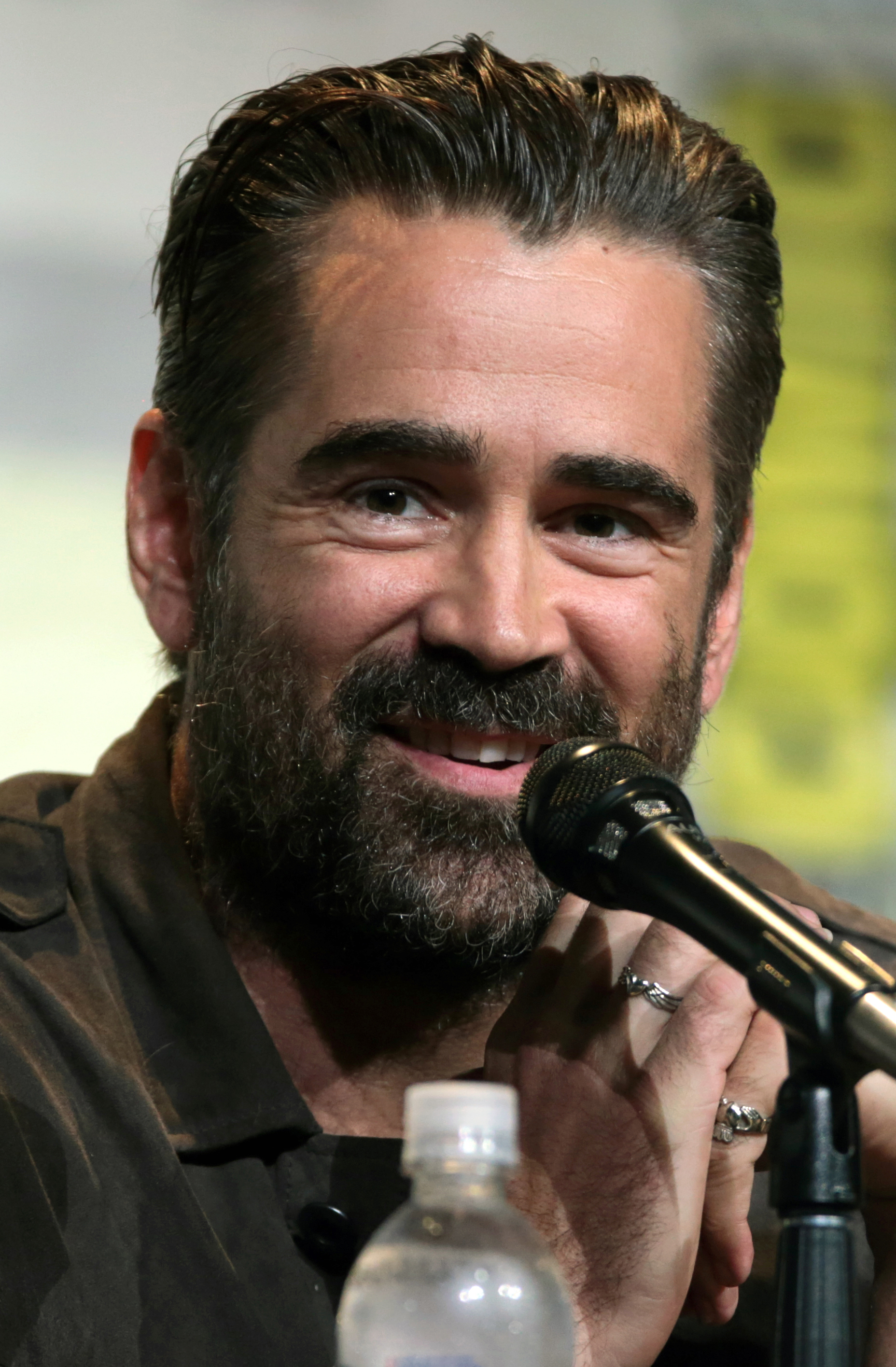
Colin Farrell, Best Actor winner

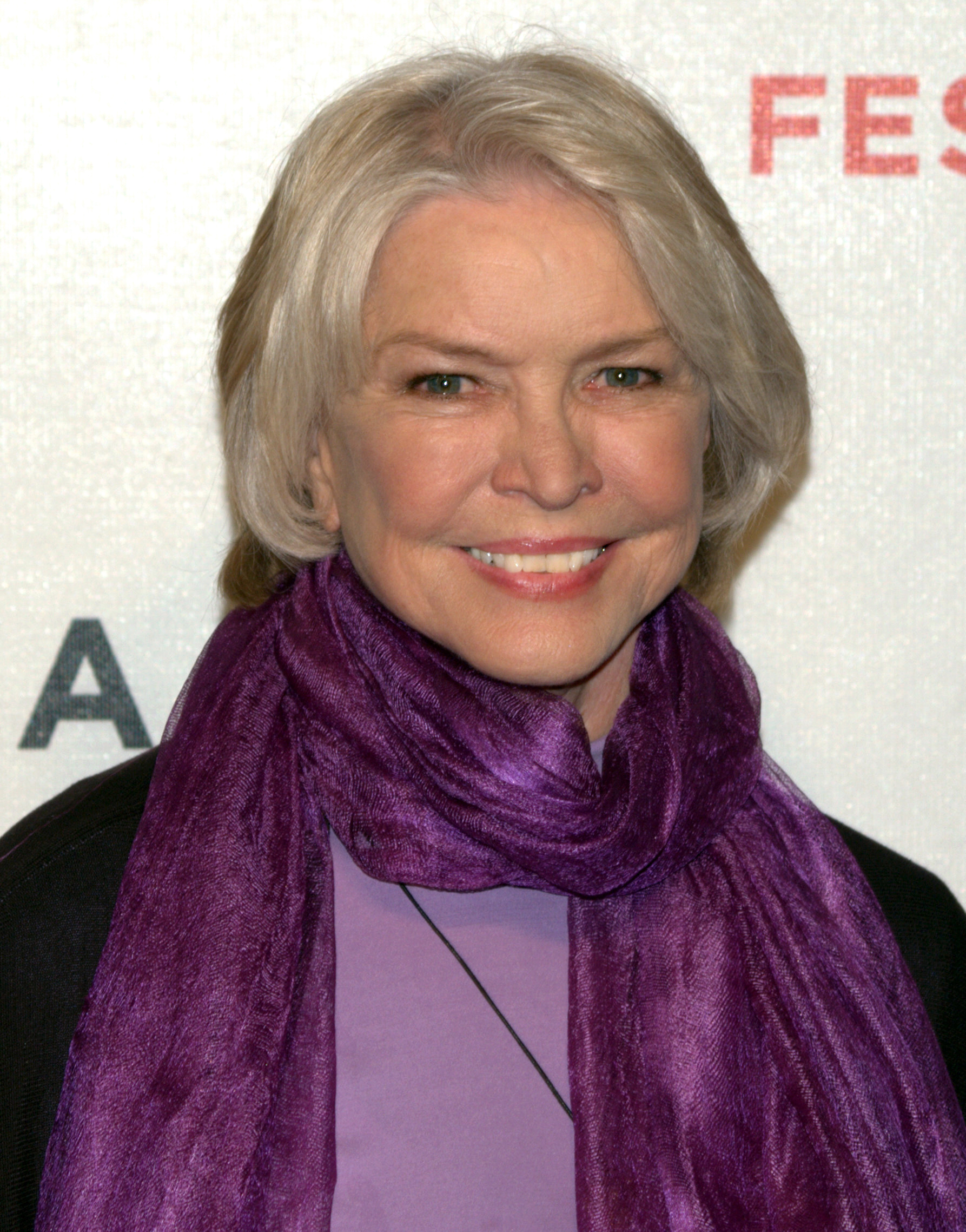
Ellen Burstyn, Best Actress winner

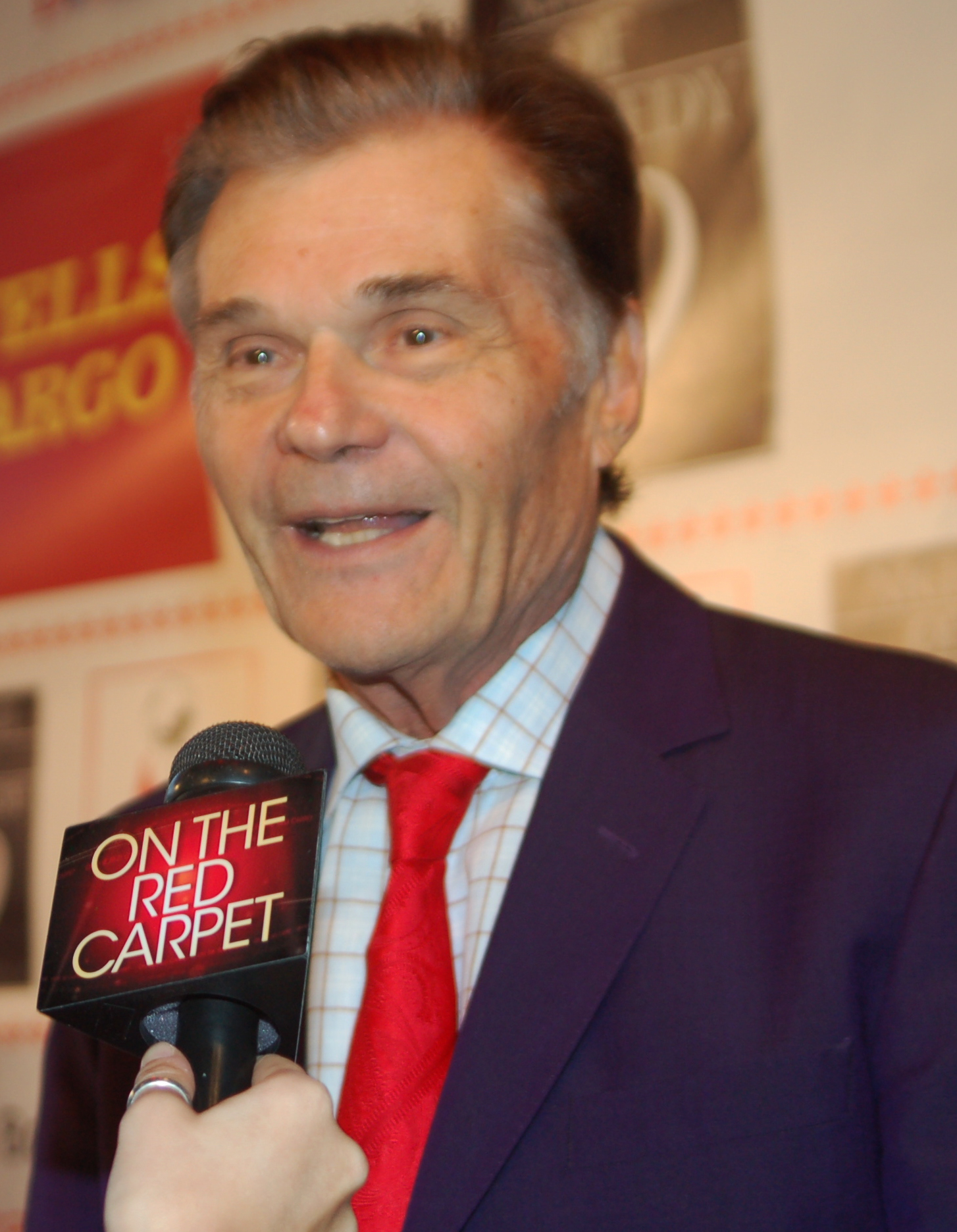
Fred Willard, Best Supporting Actor winner

Frances McDormand, Best Supporting Actress winner

=== Best Picture ===
1. Almost Famous
2. Yi Yi
3. Erin Brockovich

=== Best Actor ===
1. Colin Farrell – Tigerland
2. Javier Bardem – Before Night Falls
3. Tom Hanks – Cast Away
3. Mark Ruffalo – You Can Count on Me

=== Best Actress ===
1. Ellen Burstyn – Requiem for a Dream
2. Laura Linney – You Can Count on Me
3. Julia Roberts – Erin Brockovich

=== Best Supporting Actor ===
1. Fred Willard – Best in Show
2. Jack Black – High Fidelity
3. Albert Finney – Erin Brockovich

=== Best Supporting Actress ===
1. Frances McDormand – Almost Famous and Wonder Boys
2. Julie Walters – Billy Elliot
3. Madeline Kahn – Judy Berlin

=== Best Director ===
1. Cameron Crowe – Almost Famous
2. Edward Yang – Yi Yi
3. Steven Soderbergh – Erin Brockovich and Traffic
3. Michael Winterbottom – The Claim and Wonderland

=== Best Screenplay ===
1. Cameron Crowe – Almost Famous
1. Steve Kloves – Wonder Boys
3. Mike White – Chuck & Buck

=== Best Cinematography ===
1. Peter Pau – Crouching Tiger, Hidden Dragon (Wo hu cang long)
2. Agnès Godard – Beau Travail
3. Alwin H. Kuchler – The Claim
3. Matthew Libatique – Tigerland and Requiem for a Dream

=== Best Documentary ===
1. The Eyes of Tammy Faye
2. The Life and Times of Hank Greenberg
3. Into the Arms of Strangers

=== Best Foreign-Language Film ===
1. Crouching Tiger, Hidden Dragon (Wo hu cang long) • China/Taiwan
2. Yi Yi • Taiwan/Japan
3. The Color of Paradise (Rang-e khoda) • Iran

=== Best New Filmmaker ===
1. Kenneth Lonergan – You Can Count on Me
2. Stephen Daldry – Billy Elliot
3. Eric Mendelsohn – Judy Berlin
