= Dallas–Fort Worth Film Critics Association Awards 2000 =

Annual US film awards ceremony

6th Dallas-Fort Worth Film Critics Association Awards
- Date: January 6, 2001
- Location: Dallas, Texas
- Country: United States
- Presented by: Dallas-Fort Worth Film Critics Association
- Website: dfwfilmcritics.net

The 6th Dallas-Fort Worth Film Critics Association Awards, honoring the best in film for 2000, were given on January 6, 2001.

== Top 10 films ==
1. Traffic
2. Wo hu cang long (Crouching Tiger, Hidden Dragon)
3. Gladiator *Academy Award for Best Picture*
4. O Brother, Where Art Thou?
5. Almost Famous
6. Erin Brockovich
7. Chicken Run
8. Wonder Boys
9. Finding Forrester
10. You Can Count on Me

== Winners ==
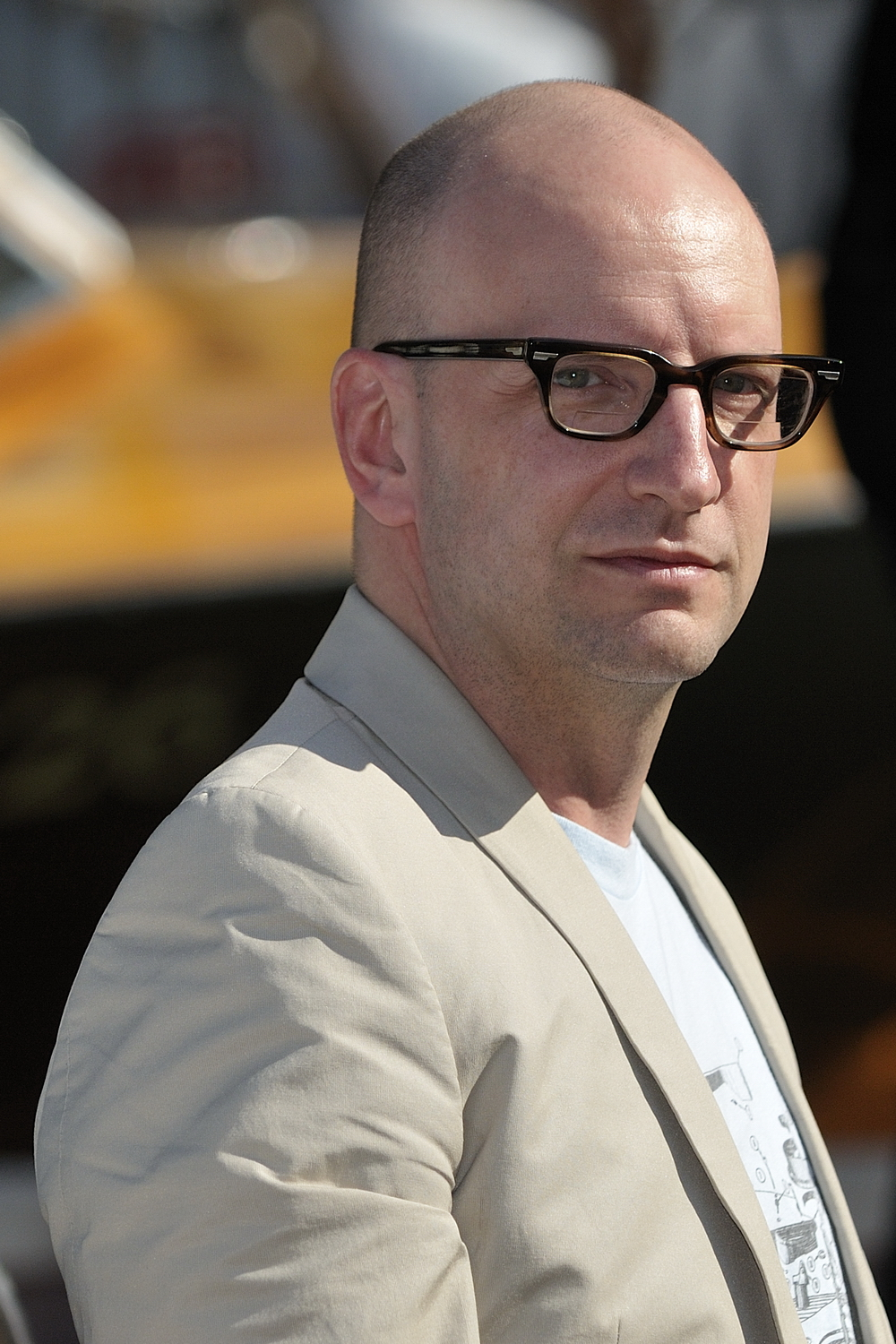
Steven Soderbergh, Best Director winner

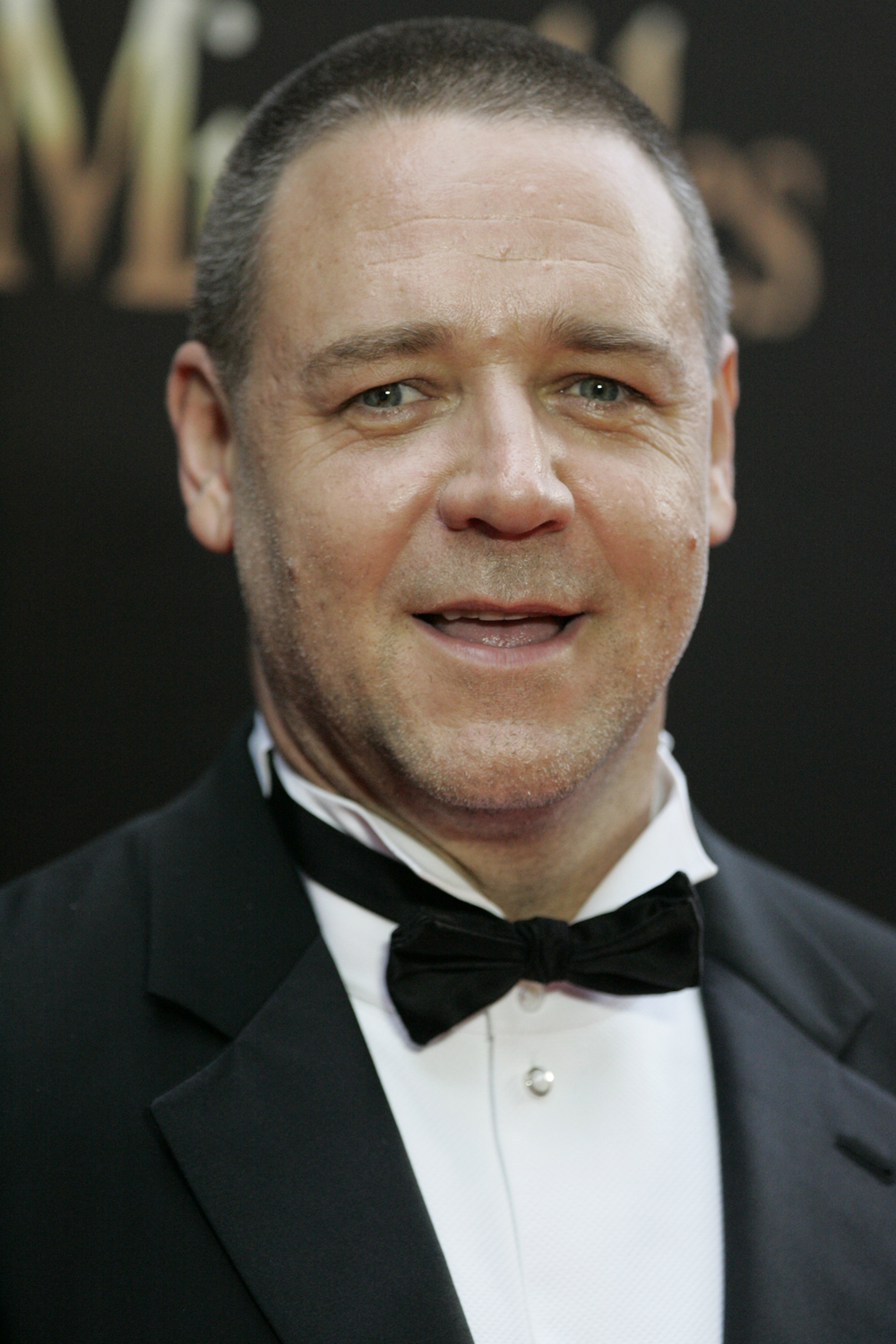
Russell Crowe, Best Actor winner

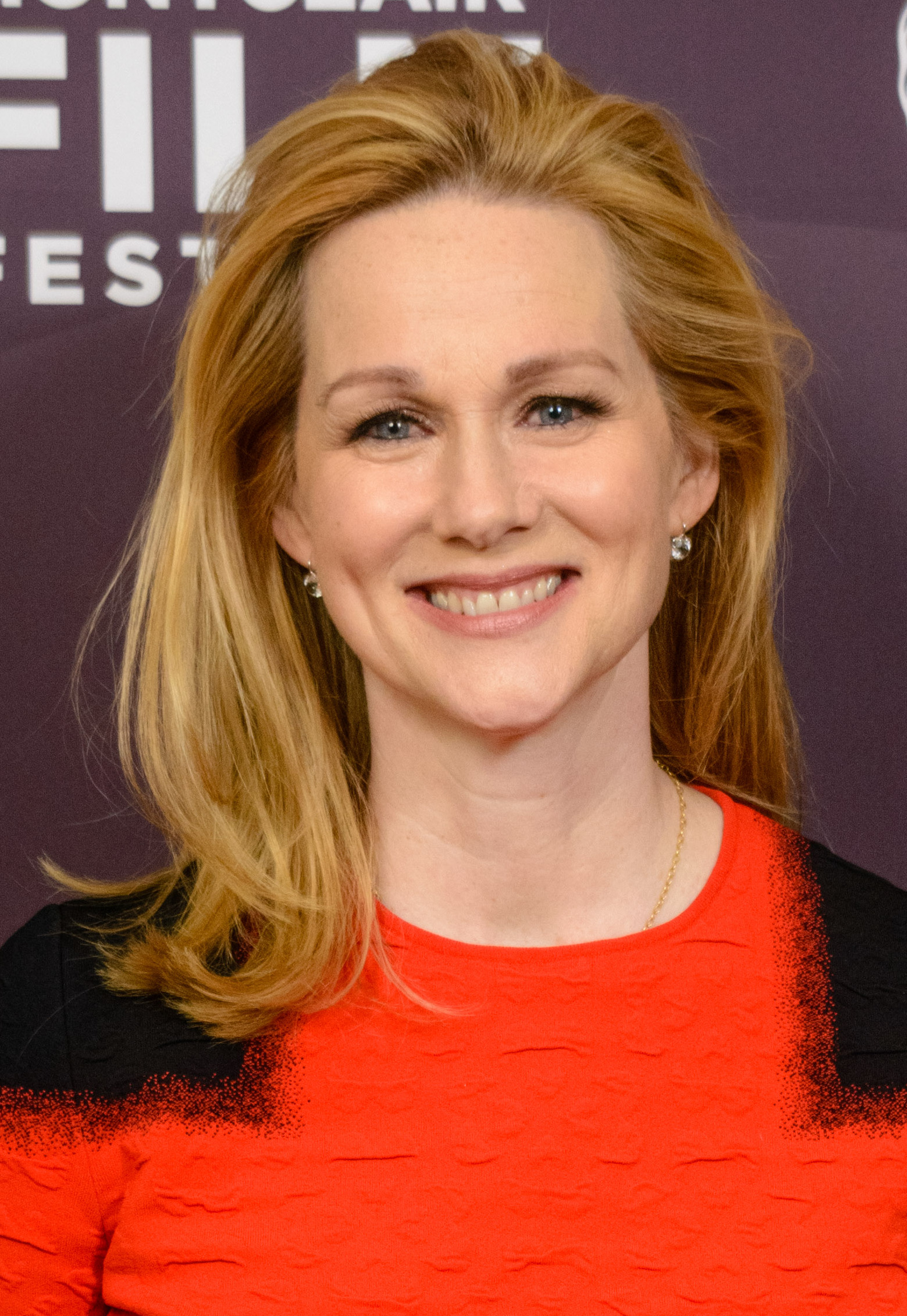
Laura Linney, Best Actress winner

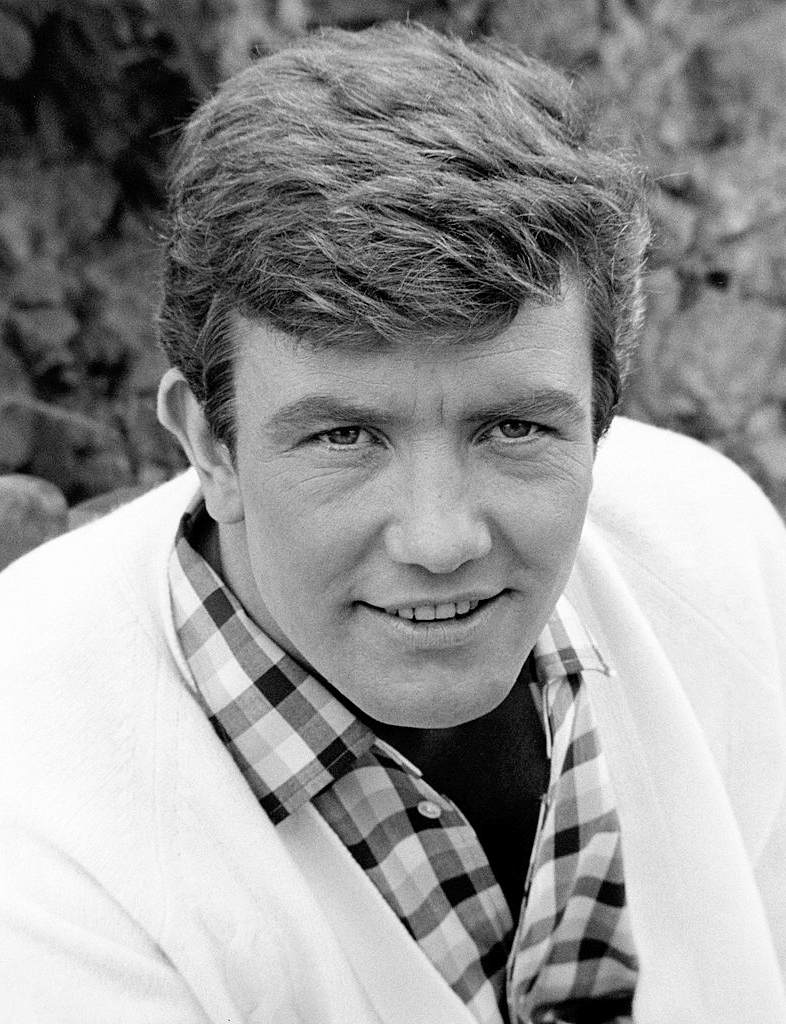
Albert Finney, Best Supporting Actor winner

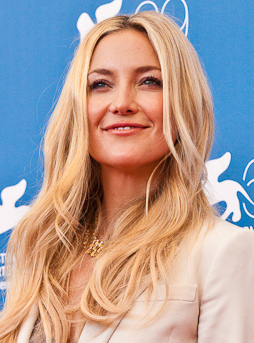
Kate Hudson, Best Supporting Actress winner

- Best Actor:
  - Russell Crowe – Gladiator
- Best Actress:
  - Laura Linney – You Can Count on Me
- Best Animated Film:
  - Chicken Run
- Best Cinematography:
  - Crouching Tiger, Hidden Dragon (Wo hu cang long) – Peter Pau
- Best Director:
  - Steven Soderbergh – Traffic
- Best Film:
  - Traffic
- Best Foreign Film:
  - Crouching Tiger, Hidden Dragon (Wo hu cang long) • Taiwan
- Best Supporting Actor:
  - Albert Finney – Erin Brockovich
- Best Supporting Actress:
  - Kate Hudson – Almost Famous
- Worst Film:
  - Battlefield Earth: A Saga of the Year 3000
