= You Can Count on Me =

- Theatrical release poster
- Directed by: Kenneth Lonergan
- Written by: Kenneth Lonergan
- Produced by: Jeffrey Sharp; John Hart; Larry Meistrich; Barbara De Fina
- Starring: Laura Linney; Mark Ruffalo; Matthew Broderick; Jon Tenney; Rory Culkin
- Cinematography: Stephen Kazmierski
- Edited by: Anne McCabe
- Music by: Lesley Barber
- Production companies: The Shooting Gallery; Hart Sharp Entertainment; Cappa Productions
- Distributed by: Paramount Classics
- Release dates: January 21, 2000 (Sundance); November 10, 2000 (United States)
- Running time: 111 minutes
- Country: United States
- Language: English
- Budget: $1.2 million
- Box office: $11.2 million

You Can Count on Me is a 2000 American drama film written and directed by Kenneth Lonergan in his feature directorial debut, and starring Laura Linney, Mark Ruffalo, Rory Culkin, and Matthew Broderick. The film follows a single mother living in a small Catskill Mountains town whose life is disrupted when her struggling, wayward younger brother returns.

Development for You Can Count on Me began in the 1990s, with Lonergan completing the screenplay based on characters that were the focus of a one-act play he wrote. Principal photography took place on location in the Catskill Mountains in 1999.

You Can Count on Me premiered at the Sundance Film Festival on January 21, 2000, where it tied with Girlfight for the Grand Jury Prize, and Lonergan won the Waldo Salt Screenwriting Award. It was given a limited theatrical release released in the United States by Paramount Classics beginning November 10, 2000, with its release eventually expanding to 150 theaters nationwide. The film went on to become a sleeper hit, earning $11.2 million internationally, and was met with critical acclaim. At the 73rd Academy Awards, Linney was nominated for Best Actress and Lonergan was nominated for Best Original Screenplay.

== Plot ==
Sammy and Terry Prescott lose their parents to a car crash. Years later, Sammy, a single mother and loan officer at a bank, still lives in her childhood home in a village in the Catskill Mountains of New York, while Terry has drifted around the country, scraping by and getting in and out of trouble.

After months of no communication with his sister, Terry and his girlfriend Sheila are desperate for money, so he comes to visit Sammy and her son Rudy, who are excited about reuniting with him. Despite the disappointment of learning that he cut off contact because he was in jail for three months, Sammy lends him the money, which he mails back to Sheila. After Sheila attempts suicide, he decides to extend his stay with Sammy, which she welcomes.

For a school writing assignment, Rudy imagines his father, who he has no memory of, as a fantastic hero. While Sammy has always given him vague yet negative descriptions of Rudy Sr., Terry is frank with him that Rudy Sr. is not a nice person – though Rudy naively believes his father has changed. Sammy rekindles a sexual relationship with Bob, an old boyfriend, but is surprised when he proposes to her after a short time so says she needs time to consider it.

At the bank, the new manager Brian tries to make his mark with unusual demands about computer color schemes and daily timesheets. While co-worker Mabel works well with the changes, Sammy is upset when Brian requests that she make arrangements for someone else to pick up Rudy from the school bus rather than Sammy leaving work at random. After some minor arguments, they start having sex, despite Brian's wife being six months pregnant.

Terry grows close to Rudy during their time together. Yet he pushes the limits of Sammy's parental control, keeping Rudy out very late as the two play pool at a bar. She turns to Ron, her church minister, to counsel Terry about his aimless outlook on life. While Terry resists his sister's advice, he and Rudy grow steadily closer. Realizing her own questionable decisions, Sammy turns down Bob's marriage proposal and breaks off her fling with Brian.

After a day of fishing, Terry and Rudy decide to visit Rudy Sr. in a trailer park in a nearby town. Confronted by his past, Rudy Sr. denies he is Rudy's father and starts a brawl with Terry. Rudy watches silently as Terry beats Rudy Sr. and gets arrested.

Sammy brings her brother and son home. When Rudy insists that Rudy Sr. is not his father, Sammy finally tells him the truth. Sammy asks Terry to move out, but admits how important he is to her and Rudy, suggesting he get his own place in town and get his life back on track. He scoffs at Sammy's idea and plans to go back to Alaska. While at first it appears the separation will be another heartache, they reconcile before Terry leaves, coming to terms with their respective paths in life.

== Cast ==
- Laura Linney as Samantha "Sammy" Prescott
- Mark Ruffalo as Terry Prescott
- Matthew Broderick as Brian Everett
- Jon Tenney as Bob
- Rory Culkin as Rudy Prescott, Sammy's son
- J. Smith-Cameron as Mabel
- Josh Lucas as Rudy Sr.
- Gaby Hoffmann as Sheila Seidleman, Terry's girlfriend
- Adam LeFevre as Sheriff Darryl
- Amy Ryan as Mrs. Prescott, Sammy & Terry's late mother
- Michael Countryman as Mr. Prescott, Sammy & Terry's late father
- Kenneth Lonergan as Ron

== Production ==
=== Development ===
Kenneth Lonergan began developing the screenplay for You Can Count on Me around 1995, after he had written and staged a one-act play featuring the sibling characters of Sammy and Terry. "It was always going to be a movie even though it was based on the one-act, because the town itself plays such a big part of the story—what it meant to him and what it meant to her—and it’s hard to convey a sense of a town’s outdoor atmosphere in a play," said Lonergan. "I always saw their relationship to the town and to the scenery too—I wanted it to be in a very beautiful setting that felt constrictive to him but calming and secure to her—and I didn’t know how in the world to do that in a play."

You Can Count on Me marked the feature film debut for Lonergan, who had previously worked primarily in theater. John Hart, the original main producer for the film, promised Lonergan a budget of $3 million if he could cast two notable stars in the lead roles; $2 million if he could cast one notable star; and $1 million if the film featured unknown actors.

To produce the film, Hart partnered with The Shooting Gallery, an independent film company which filed bankruptcy shortly after You Can Count on Me was released. In a later interview, Lonergan described the company as "crooked" and alleged that they owed him and several other filmmakers money which went unpaid.

=== Casting ===
Matthew Broderick was the first actor to be cast in the film in the supporting role of Laura's boss. Lonergan said that "the whole film was actually contingent on him being in it, because he was the biggest star in it." J. Smith-Cameron, Lonergan's then-girlfriend, was cast in a minor role.

Laura Linney was cast in the lead of Sammy after auditioning for the part. Lonergan said he was drawn to the "wonderful sunniness to her but also this sadness—not smiling-through-the-tears but genuine warmth and a genuine depth of feeling." While Linney was an established actress at the time, Mark Ruffalo was largely unknown, and Lonergan said the film's producers were "a little bit nervous about [casting] him." However, after executives observed Linney and Ruffalo performing scene readings together, they approved Lonergan's casting choice.

=== Filming ===
Principal photography of You Can Count on Me lasted 28 days, with six-day work weeks. Lonergan recalled being "miserable" and "a nervous wreck" on the set, though he said: "Nobody on set was difficult though, the cast and crew were wonderful."

The story takes place in the Catskill region of south east New York state, in the fictionalized communities of Scottsville and Auburn. While there is an actual Scottsville and Auburn, New York, they are over 200 miles (320 km) away, in the north west Great Lakes and Finger Lakes regions of the state, respectively. The film was primarily shot in and around Margaretville, New York, a village on the border of Catskill Park, in June 1999.

While the bank exteriors were filmed at Margaretville's NBT Bank, the interiors were filmed in an unrelated bank closer to New York City, since NBT considered interior filming a security risk. The scenes where Rudy Jr. walks home in the rain were filmed with the assistance of the Margaretville Fire Department, which used their trucks and hoses to create the rain.

Some outdoor scenes, most notably the fishing trip, were filmed in Phoenicia, New York. The Margaretville cemetery could not be seen from the road, so those scenes were shot at a cemetery 4 miles (6.4 km) outside the village, on Route 30.

== Soundtrack ==
You Can Count on Me

Soundtrack album by Various
- Released: November 7, 2000
- Genres: Folk; Americana; bluegrass
- Label: Artemis Records

No.	Title	Artist	Length
1.	"Texas Eagle"	Steve Earle & the Del McCoury Band	3:29
2.	"Straight Highway"	The V-Roys	2:13
3.	"Far Away You"	Marah	3:32
4.	"Vampire"	Bap Kennedy	2:37
5.	"Strange"	The V-Roys	2:32
6.	"White Lies"	Cheri Knight	3:31
7.	"Harlan Man"	Steve Earle & the Del McCoury Band	3:22
8.	"White Lies"	Steve Earle & the Del McCoury Band	4:43
9.	"Amy 88"	The V-Roys	2:20
10.	"Mendocino"	6 String Drag	3:08
11.	"I'm Still In Love with You"	Steve Earle & The Del McCoury Band	4:06
12.	"Pilgrim"	Steve Earle & The Del McCoury Band	5:28

== Release ==
You Can Count on Me premiered at the Sundance Film Festival on January 21, 2000, where it competed for the Grand Jury Prize and tied with Girlfight (2000).

Paramount Classics gave the film a limited theatrical release in the United States beginning November 10, 2000, with the release expanding later that month over the Thanksgiving weekend. Its release eventually expanded to 150 theaters nationwide on December 22, 2000.

=== Home media ===
The film was released on DVD and VHS from Paramount Home Entertainment on June 26, 2001. It comes with commentary from director–writer Lonergan, cast and crew interviews, plus the theatrical trailer. In July 2025, it was released in 4K and standard Blu-ray formats by The Criterion Collection.

== Reception ==
=== Box office ===
During the film's U.S. opening weekend beginning November 10, 2000, the film earned $118,170 between 8 theaters. Over the Thanksgiving weekend, the film's release expanded to 53 theaters, with a weekend gross of $417,000, averaging $7,868 per screen.

The film went on to become a sleeper hit, grossing $9,416,804 in the United States, and $1,825,717 internationally, for a worldwide gross of $11,242,521.

=== Critical response ===
The film received critical acclaim. On the review aggregator website Rotten Tomatoes, 95% of 105 critics' reviews are positive, with an average rating of 8.1/10. The website's consensus reads: "You Can Count on Me may look like it belongs on the small screen, but the movie surprises with its simple yet affecting story. Beautifully acted and crafted, the movie will simply draw you in." Metacritic, which uses a weighted average, assigned the film a score of 85 out of 100, based on 31 critics, indicating "universal acclaim".

Los Angeles Magazine highly praised the film, specifically for its writing and acting. Reviewer Stephen Holden described the film as "the perfectly pitched directorial debut of the playwright (This Is Our Youth) and screenwriter (Analyze This) Kenneth Lonergan. Because it arrives near the end of one of the most dismal film seasons in memory, this melancholy little gem of a movie, which won two major awards at the Sundance Film Festival, qualifies as one of the two or three finest American films released this year....You Can Count on Me is an exquisitely observed slice of upstate New York life that reminds us there are still plenty of American communities where the pace is more human than computer-driven. The movie dares to portray small-town middle-class life in America as somewhat drab and predictable. Without ever condescending to its characters, it trusts that the everyday problems of ordinary people, if portrayed with enough knowledge, empathy and insight, can be as compelling as the most bizarre screaming carnival on The Jerry Springer Show."

David Edelstein called the film the "best American movie of the year", noting that "[w]hat the film is 'about' can't be summed up in a line: Its themes remain just out of reach, its major conflicts sadly unresolved. But Lonergan writes bottomless dialogue. When his people open their mouths, what comes out is never a definitive expression of character: It's an awkward compromise between how they feel and what they're able to say; or how they feel and what they think they should say; or how they feel and what will best conceal how they feel. The common term for this is "subtext," and You Can Count on Me has a subtext so powerful that it reaches out and pulls you under. Even when the surface is tranquil, you know in your guts what's at stake." Edelstein concludes "Lonergan doesn't yet know how to make the camera show us things that his dialogue doesn't, but when you write dialogue like he does, you can take your time to learn. Hell, he can take another 20 movies to learn."

According to Roger Ebert, "Beyond and beneath, that is the rich human story of You Can Count on Me. I love the way Lonergan shows his characters in flow, pressed this way and that by emotional tides and practical considerations. This is not a movie about people solving things. This is a movie about people living day to day with their plans, fears and desires. It's rare to get a good movie about the touchy adult relationship of a sister and brother. Rarer still for the director to be more fascinated by the process than the outcome. This is one of the best movies of the year."

Rob Mackie of The Guardian praised the film, likening it to Alice Doesn't Live Here Anymore and writing: "In its unassuming way, this is one of the finest films in a disappointing year for American movies... Lonergan films it in short, pithy scenes and leaves the interpretation up to you: is Ruffalo a liberating influence or was Culkin better with a protective mother as his formative influence? These are the sort of people US movies very rarely bother with."

In a 2016 BBC poll, You Can Count on Me was voted by four critics as one of the greatest films since 2000. In 2021, members of Writers Guild of America West (WGAW) and Writers Guild of America, East (WGAE) voted its screenplay 58th in WGA’s 101 Greatest Screenplays of the 21st Century (So Far).

=== Accolades ===
Institution	Year	Category	Recipient(s)	Result	Ref.
Academy Awards	2001	Best Actress	Laura Linney	Nominated	
Academy Awards	2001	Best Original Screenplay	Kenneth Lonergan	Nominated	
American Film Institute Awards	2000	Top 10 Movies of the Year	You Can Count on Me	Won	
American Film Institute Fest	2000	New Directions Award	Kenneth Lonergan	Nominated	
American Film Institute Fest	2000	Best New Writer	Kenneth Lonergan	Won	
Awards Circuit Community Awards	2000	Best Actress in a Leading Role	Laura Linney	Nominated	
Awards Circuit Community Awards	2000	Best Original Screenplay	Kenneth Lonergan	Nominated	
Bodil Awards	2002	Best American Film	You Can Count on Me	Nominated	
Boston Society of Film Critics Awards	2000	Best Actor	Mark Ruffalo	3rd Place	
Boston Society of Film Critics Awards	2000	Best Actress	Laura Linney	2nd Place	
Boston Society of Film Critics Awards	2000	Best New Filmmaker	Kenneth Lonergan	Won	
British Film Institute Awards	2001	Sutherland Trophy	Kenneth Lonergan	Won	
Chicago Film Critics Association Awards	2001	Best Film	You Can Count on Me	Nominated	
Chicago Film Critics Association Awards	2001	Best Actor	Mark Ruffalo	Nominated	
Chicago Film Critics Association Awards	2001	Best Actress	Laura Linney	Nominated	
Chicago Film Critics Association Awards	2001	Best Screenplay	Kenneth Lonergan	Nominated	
Chlotrudis Awards	2000	Best Actor	Mark Ruffalo	Nominated	
Chlotrudis Awards	2000	Best Actress	Laura Linney	Nominated	
Chlotrudis Awards	2000	Best Original Screenplay	Kenneth Lonergan	Nominated	
Critics' Choice Awards	2001	Best Picture	You Can Count on Me	Nominated	
Critics' Choice Awards	2001	Best Supporting Actress	Laura Linney	Nominated	
Dallas–Fort Worth Film Critics Association Awards	2001	Top 10 Films	You Can Count on Me	10th Place	
Dallas–Fort Worth Film Critics Association Awards	2001	Best Film	You Can Count on Me	Nominated	
Dallas–Fort Worth Film Critics Association Awards	2001	Best Actress	Laura Linney	Won	
Dallas–Fort Worth Film Critics Association Awards	2001	Best Supporting Actor	Mark Ruffalo	5th Place	
Dallas–Fort Worth Film Critics Association Awards	2001	Russell Smith Award	Kenneth Lonergan	Won	
Golden Globe Awards	2001	Best Actress in a Motion Picture – Drama	Laura Linney	Nominated	
Golden Globe Awards	2001	Best Screenplay	Kenneth Lonergan	Nominated	
Gotham Independent Film Awards	2000	Breakthrough Director (Open Palm Award)	Kenneth Lonergan	Nominated	
Humanitas Prize	2002	Feature Film	Kenneth Lonergan	Won	
Independent Spirit Awards	2001	Best First Feature	You Can Count on Me	Won	
Independent Spirit Awards	2001	Best Male Lead	Mark Ruffalo	Nominated	
Independent Spirit Awards	2001	Best Female Lead	Laura Linney	Nominated	
Independent Spirit Awards	2001	Best Screenplay	Kenneth Lonergan	Won	
Independent Spirit Awards	2001	Best Debut Performance	Rory Culkin	Nominated	
Los Angeles Film Critics Association Awards	2000	Best Actress	Laura Linney	Runner-up	
Los Angeles Film Critics Association Awards	2000	Best Screenplay	Kenneth Lonergan	Won	
Los Angeles Film Critics Association Awards	2000	New Generation Award	Mark Ruffalo	Won	
Montreal World Film Festival	2000	Grand Prix des Amériques	Kenneth Lonergan	Nominated	
Montreal World Film Festival	2000	Prize of the Ecumenical Jury – Special Mention	Kenneth Lonergan	Won	
Montreal World Film Festival	2000	Best Actor	Mark Ruffalo	Won	
National Board of Review	2001	Top Ten Films	You Can Count on Me	4th Place	
National Board of Review	2001	Special Filmmaking Achievement	Kenneth Lonergan	Won	
National Society of Film Critics Awards	2001	Best Actor	Mark Ruffalo	2nd Place	
National Society of Film Critics Awards	2001	Best Actress	Laura Linney	Won	
National Society of Film Critics Awards	2001	Best Screenplay	Kenneth Lonergan	Won	
New York Film Critics Circle Awards	2001	Best Actress	Laura Linney	Won	
New York Film Critics Circle Awards	2001	Best Screenplay	Kenneth Lonergan	Won	
Online Film & Television Association Awards	2000	Best Actress	Laura Linney	Nominated	
Online Film & Television Association Awards	2000	Best Original Screenplay	Kenneth Lonergan	Nominated	
Online Film & Television Association Awards	2000	Best First Feature	Kenneth Lonergan	Won	
Online Film Critics Society Awards	2001	Best Actress	Laura Linney	Nominated	
Online Film Critics Society Awards	2001	Best Screenplay	Kenneth Lonergan	Nominated	
Phoenix Film Critics Society Awards	2000	Best Actress in a Leading Role	Laura Linney	Nominated	
Phoenix Film Critics Society Awards	2000	Best Original Screenplay	Kenneth Lonergan	Nominated	
Phoenix Film Critics Society Awards	2000	Best Performance by a Youth in a Leading or Supporting Role	Rory Culkin	Nominated	
San Diego Film Critics Society Awards	2000	Best Actor	Mark Ruffalo	Nominated	
San Diego Film Critics Society Awards	2000	Best Actress	Laura Linney	Won (Note: Tied with Julia Roberts for Erin Brockovich.)	
Satellite Awards	2001	Best Actress in a Motion Picture – Drama	Laura Linney	Nominated	
Satellite Awards	2001	Best Original Screenplay	Kenneth Lonergan	Won	
Screen Actors Guild Awards	2001	Outstanding Performance by a Female Actor in a Leading Role	Laura Linney	Nominated	
Southeastern Film Critics Association Awards	2000	Best Picture	You Can Count on Me	5th Place	
Southeastern Film Critics Association Awards	2000	Best Actor	Mark Ruffalo	Nominated	
Southeastern Film Critics Association Awards	2000	Best Actress	Laura Linney	Nominated	
Stockholm International Film Festival	2000	Bronze Horse (Best Film)	Kenneth Lonergan	Nominated	
Sundance Film Festival	2000	Grand Jury Prize: Dramatic	Kenneth Lonergan	Won (Note: Tied with Karyn Kusama for Girlfight.)	
Sundance Film Festival	2000	Waldo Salt Screenwriting Award	Kenneth Lonergan	Won	
Toronto Film Critics Association Awards	2000	Best Male Performance	Mark Ruffalo	Runner-up	
Toronto Film Critics Association Awards	2000	Best Female Performance	Laura Linney	Won	
Toronto Film Critics Association Awards	2000	Best Screenplay	Kenneth Lonergan	Won	
Vancouver Film Critics Circle Awards	2001	Best Actor	Mark Ruffalo	Nominated	
Vancouver Film Critics Circle Awards	2001	Best Actress	Laura Linney	Won	
Writers Guild of America Awards	2001	Best Screenplay – Written Directly for the Screen	Kenneth Lonergan	Won	
Young Artist Awards	2001	Best Performance in a Feature Film – Supporting Young Actor	Rory Culkin	Won	

== Notes ==
Awards and achievements
Preceded by Three Seasons	Sundance Grand Jury Prize: U.S. Dramatic; 2000 tied with Girlfight	Succeeded by The Believer
