= National Board of Review Awards 2000 =

Film award edition

72nd NBR Awards

December 6, 2000

Best Film:
Quills

The 72nd National Board of Review Awards, honoring the best in filmmaking in 2000, were announced on 6 December 2000 and given on 16 January 2001.

== Top 10 films ==
1. Quills
2. Traffic
3. Croupier
4. You Can Count on Me
5. Billy Elliot
6. Before Night Falls
7. Gladiator
8. Wonder Boys
9. Sunshine
10. Dancer in the Dark

== Top Foreign Films ==
1. Crouching Tiger, Hidden Dragon
2. Butterfly
3. A Time for Drunken Horses
4. Malèna
5. Girl on the Bridge

== Winners ==
- Best Film:
  - Quills
- Best Foreign Language Film:
  - Wo hu cang long (Crouching Tiger, Hidden Dragon), Taiwan/Hong Kong/United States/P.R. China
- Best Actor:
  - Javier Bardem – Before Night Falls
- Best Actress:
  - Julia Roberts – Erin Brockovich
- Best Supporting Actor:
  - Joaquin Phoenix – Gladiator
- Best Supporting Actress:
  - Lupe Ontiveros – Chuck & Buck
- Breakthrough Performance – Male:
  - Jamie Bell – Billy Elliot
- Breakthrough Performance – Female:
  - Michelle Rodríguez – Girlfight
- Best Acting by and Ensemble:
  - State and Main
- Best Director:
  - Steven Soderbergh – Erin Brockovich and Traffic
- Best Screenplay:
  - All the Pretty Horses – Ted Tally
- Best Documentary Feature:
  - The Life and Times of Hank Greenberg
- Best Animated Feature:
  - Chicken Run
- Career Achievement Award:
  - Ellen Burstyn
- Special Filmmaking Achievement:
  - Kenneth Lonergan – You Can Count on Me
- Outstanding Production Design:
  - Arthur Max – Gladiator
- Career Achievement – Music Composition:
  - Ennio Morricone
- William K. Everson Award for Film History:
  - Roger Gottlieb and Robert Kimball, Reading Lyrics
- Special Citations:
  - Björk – Outstanding Dramatic Music Performance, Dancer in the Dark
  - Dekalog, Outstanding Cinematic Series
- Freedom of Expression:
  - A Time for Drunken Horses
  - Bamboozled
  - Before Night Falls
  - The Circle
  - Kadosh
  - Quills
  - Sound and Fury
  - The Visit
- Special Recognition for Excellence in Filmmaking:
  - American Psycho
  - Best in Show
  - Chuck & Buck
  - Girlfight
  - Hamlet
  - Nurse Betty
  - Requiem for a Dream
  - Shower
  - Snatch
  - Two Family House
