= Toronto Film Critics Association Awards 2000 =

Annual Canadian film awards ceremony

4th TFCA Awards

December 17, 2000

Best Film:
Crouching Tiger,
Hidden Dragon

The 4th Toronto Film Critics Association Awards, honoring the best in film for 2000, were held on 17 December 2000.

== Winners ==
- Best Actor:
  - Benicio del Toro – Traffic

Runner-Up: Mark Ruffalo – You Can Count on Me

- Best Actress:
  - Laura Linney – You Can Count on Me

Runner-Up: Michelle Yeoh – Crouching Tiger, Hidden Dragon

- Best Canadian Film:
  - waydowntown

Runner-Up: Maelström

- Best Director:
  - Steven Soderbergh – Traffic

Runner-Up: Ang Lee – Crouching Tiger, Hidden Dragon

- Best Film:
  - Crouching Tiger, Hidden Dragon

Runner-Up: Traffic

- Best Screenplay:
  - You Can Count on Me – Kenneth Lonergan

Runner-Up: After Life – Hirokazu Koreeda

- Best Supporting Actor (tie):
  - Tobey Maguire – Wonder Boys
  - Jeffrey Wright – Shaft
- Best Supporting Actress:
  - Zhang Ziyi – Crouching Tiger, Hidden Dragon

Runner-Up: Ellen Burstyn – Requiem for a Dream
