= Wonder Boys (film) =

2000 film by Curtis Hanson

- Theatrical release poster
- Directed by: Curtis Hanson
- Screenplay by: Steve Kloves
- Based on: Wonder Boys by Michael Chabon
- Produced by: Curtis Hanson; Scott Rudin
- Starring: Michael Douglas; Tobey Maguire; Frances McDormand; Katie Holmes; Rip Torn; Robert Downey Jr.
- Cinematography: Dante Spinotti
- Edited by: Dede Allen
- Music by: Christopher Young
- Production companies: Mutual Film Company; BBC Films; Curtis Hanson Productions; Marubeni; MFF Feature Film Productions; Scott Rudin Productions; Tele München Fernseh Produktionsgesellschaft; Toho-Towa
- Distributed by: Paramount Pictures (United States); United International Pictures (United Kingdom); Concorde Filmverleih (Germany); Toho-Towa (Japan)
- Release dates: February 23, 2000 (Los Angeles and New York); February 25, 2000 (United States); September 2, 2000 (Japan); November 2, 2000 (Germany); November 3, 2000 (United Kingdom)
- Running time: 111 minutes
- Countries: Japan; Germany; United States; United Kingdom
- Language: English
- Budget: $55 million
- Box office: $33.4 million

Wonder Boys is a 2000 comedy-drama film directed by Curtis Hanson and written by Steve Kloves. An international co-production between the United States, the United Kingdom, Germany, and Japan, it is based on the 1995 novel by Michael Chabon. Michael Douglas stars as professor Grady Tripp, a novelist who teaches creative writing at a university but has been unable to finish his second novel.

The film was shot in Pittsburgh, Pennsylvania, including locations at Carnegie Mellon University, Chatham University, University of Pittsburgh, and Shady Side Academy. Other Pennsylvania locations included Beaver, Rochester and Rostraver Township. After the film failed at the box office, there was a second attempt to find an audience with a new marketing campaign and a November 8, 2000, re-release, which was also a financial disappointment. Despite this, the film received three Academy Award nominations at the 73rd Academy Awards, including Best Adapted Screenplay, winning Best Original Song for Bob Dylan's "Things Have Changed".

== Plot ==
Novelist Grady Tripp teaches creative writing at a Pennsylvania university. He is having an affair with the university chancellor, Sara Gaskell, whose husband, Walter, is the chairman of the English department in which Grady is a professor. Grady's third wife, Emily, has just left him, and he has failed to repeat the success of his first novel, published seven years earlier. He continues to labor on a second novel, but the more he tries to finish it, the less able he finds himself to invent a satisfactory ending. He spends his free time smoking cannabis.

Grady's students include James Leer and Hannah Green. Hannah, who rents a room in Grady's house, is attracted to Grady, who does not reciprocate.

During a party at the Gaskells' house, Sara reveals to Grady that she is pregnant with his child. Grady finds James standing outside holding what he claims to be a replica gun. However, the gun is real, as James shoots the Gaskells' dog when he finds it attacking Grady. James also steals a valuable piece of Marilyn Monroe memorabilia from the house. Grady cannot tell Sara of this incident since she is pressuring him to choose between her and Emily. Grady keeps the dead dog in the trunk of his car for most of the weekend. He also allows James to follow him around, fearing that he may be depressed or suicidal. Gradually, he realizes that much of what James says about himself and his life is untrue, seemingly designed to elicit Grady's sympathy.

Meanwhile, Grady's editor, Terry Crabtree, has flown into town on the pretense of attending the university's annual WordFest, a literary event for aspiring authors. Terry is actually there to see if Grady has written anything worth publishing, as both men's careers depend on the unfinished book. Terry arrives with a date whom he met on the flight, a trans woman named Antonia Sloviak. The pair have sex in a bedroom at the Gaskells' party, but immediately afterward, Terry meets James and becomes infatuated with him, and Antonia is unceremoniously sent home. After a night on the town, Terry and James semi-consciously flirt throughout the night, which leads up to the two having sex in one of Grady's spare rooms.

Tired and confused, Grady phones Walter and confesses that he is in love with Sara. Meanwhile, Walter has made the connection between the disappearance of the Marilyn Monroe memorabilia and James. The following morning, the police arrive with Sara to escort James to her office to discuss the ramifications of his actions. The memorabilia is still in Grady's car, which has conspicuously gone missing. The car had been given to him by a friend as payment for a loan, and, over the weekend, Grady has come to suspect that the car was stolen. Throughout his travel around town, a man claiming to be the car's real owner repeatedly accosted Grady. He tracks the car down, but in a dispute over its ownership, the majority of his manuscript blows out of the car and is lost. The car's owner gives him a ride to the university with his wife Oola in the passenger seat, along with the stolen memorabilia.

Grady finally sees that making things right involves having to make difficult choices. He tells the story behind the memorabilia and allows Oola to leave with it. Worried that Grady's choice comes at the expense of damaging James's future, Terry convinces Walter not to press charges by agreeing to publish his book about Joe DiMaggio and Marilyn Monroe.

Hannah graduates and becomes a junior editor. James drops out and moves to New York to rework his novel for publication. Terry "goes right on being Crabtree." Grady finishes typing his new book – now saved on a computer – which is an account of the recent events, then watches as Sara and their child arrive home.

== Cast ==
- Michael Douglas as Professor Grady Tripp
- Tobey Maguire as James Leer
- Frances McDormand as Chancellor Sara Gaskell
- Katie Holmes as Hannah Green
- Rip Torn as Quentin "Q" Morewood
- Robert Downey Jr. as Terry Crabtree
- Richard Thomas as Walter Gaskell
- Richard Knox as Vernon Hardapple
- Jane Adams as Oola
- Alan Tudyk as Sam Traxler
- George Grizzard as Fred Leer
- Kelly Bishop as Amanda Leer
- Philip Bosco as Emily's father
- Michael Cavadias as Miss Antonia "Tony" Sloviak
- Yusef Gatewood as Howard

== Production ==
=== Development ===
After L.A. Confidential, Curtis Hanson was working on a screenplay of his own and reading other scripts with a keen interest for his next film. Actress Elizabeth McGovern advised Hanson to work with screenwriter Steve Kloves. When he was given the writer's script for Wonder Boys and was told that Michael Douglas was interested in starring, he "fell in love with these characters – and they made me laugh." Hanson also identified with Grady Tripp and the "thing building up inside him: frustration, hunger, yearning, et cetera."

=== Screenplay ===
Kloves, best known for writing and directing The Fabulous Baker Boys, returned to the film business after a self-imposed seven-year retirement to adapt Michael Chabon's novel for the money and also because he identified with Grady. He was originally going to direct the film as well but bowed out and Hanson came on board. Kloves had never adapted a novel before but was encouraged by Chabon to make the material his own. Additional changes were made once Hanson came on board. For example, he felt that James Leer would be a fan of Douglas Sirk's films as opposed to Frank Capra as he is in the novel.

=== Casting ===
Paramount was not interested in making a quirky, character-driven comedy drama until Douglas agreed to work well below his usual large fee. The actor gained 25 pounds for the film by consuming pizza, subs, and beer. One of the challenges for Hanson was to take a plot that, as he put it, "is meandering and, apparently, sort of aimless," and a character that "does things that even he doesn't really know why he's doing them," and try to create a "feeling of focus" to keep the audience interested. Another challenge the director faced was working in actual locations in very cold weather that was constantly changing.

Robert Downey Jr. was on probation during the winter of 1999 when Hanson considered him for a role in Wonder Boys. Hanson was cautious because of the actor's drug history and concerned because it would be a tough film shot in sequence in Pittsburgh in the winter. Downey flew to Pittsburgh and had a long dinner conversation with Hanson where they addressed his problems. The actor demonstrated a commitment to the project and Hanson hired him. Reportedly, Downey acted professionally for the entire four-and-a-half month shoot, but after it ended, he returned to Los Angeles and violated his parole.

In an interview with Marc Maron, actor Rob McElhenney stated that he was initially cast in a minor role as Holmes' love interest, but was informed by Hanson that he would be cut out of the film during post-production.

=== Filming ===
Paramount suggested shooting Wonder Boys in Toronto or New York City but after reading the book, Hanson realized how important Pittsburgh was to the story, that it was a "wonder boy," much like the film's main protagonist Grady Tripp, "it's a city that had this glorious past of wealth and success that ended. And then it had to deal with figuring out what's next. What happens after triumph?" Wonder Boys was filmed in Pittsburgh, including locations at Carnegie Mellon University, Chatham College, and Shady Side Academy. Other Pennsylvania locations included Beaver, Rochester, and Rostraver Township. Hanson felt that Pittsburgh was "right, emotionally and thematically" for the film. The city was experiencing a mild winter during the film's shoot and they had to use a lot of artificial snow.

Hanson contacted Dante Spinotti about working on the film in November 1998. They had worked previously together on L.A. Confidential. Spinotti had six weeks of pre-production, which he used to perform a variety of tests and shoot a number of important background plates for several scenes that take place at night, in cars. He knew that these scenes included some very critical acting and suggested using the green screen process for greater control. During pre-production, Hanson and Spinotti used the Kodak Pre View System to storyboard complicated sequences by altering digital still images in a way that simulated the imaging characteristics of camera films. Hanson suggested Spinotti see The Celebration for its technique of keeping the camera extremely close to the actors and carrying deep focus from one actor to the other. Spinotti suggested using a hand-held camera so that the film would not look static. On the first day of shooting, they incorporated some hand-held shots. Hanson liked the results and they used the technique extensively for the rest of the shoot.

== Soundtrack ==
Wonder Boys (Music from the Motion Picture)

Soundtrack album by Various artists
- Released: February 15, 2000
- Recorded: 2000
- Genre: Soundtrack
- Length: 51:46
- Label: Sony

Singles from Wonder Boys (Music from the Motion Picture)
- 1. "Things Have Changed" Released: May 1, 2000

Hanson had been a fan of Bob Dylan's music since childhood and a great admirer of his soundtrack for Pat Garrett and Billy the Kid. Dylan admired Hanson's previous film, L.A. Confidential and after much convincing, screened 90 minutes of rough footage from Wonder Boys. Hanson picked Dylan because, as he said, "Who knows more about being a Wonder Boy and the trap it can be, about the expectations and the fear of repeating yourself?"

In addition to Dylan, Hanson built the score around nine singer-songwriters including Leonard Cohen and Neil Young. The entire soundtrack is integrated into the film with Hanson playing some of the songs for the actors on the Pittsburgh set to convey a scene's "aural texture," as he put it. The soundtrack features several songs by Bob Dylan, including one new composition, "Things Have Changed," which would win the Academy Award for Best Original Song. Hanson also created a music video for the song, filming new footage of Bob Dylan on the film's various locations and editing it with footage used in Wonder Boys as if Dylan were actually in the film. According to Hanson, "Every song reflects the movie's themes of searching for past promise, future success and a sense of purpose."

1. "Things Have Changed" - Bob Dylan (5:10)
2. "A Child's Claim to Fame" - Buffalo Springfield (2:12)
3. "No Regrets" - Tom Rush (3:52)
4. "Old Man" - Neil Young (3:23)
5. "Shooting Star" - Bob Dylan (3:09)
6. "Reason to Believe" – Tim Hardin (2:00)
7. "Need Your Love So Bad" - Little Willie John (2:17)
8. "Not Dark Yet" - Bob Dylan (6:30)
9. "Slip Away" - Clarence Carter (2:32)
10. "Waiting for the Miracle" - Leonard Cohen (7:43)
11. "Buckets of Rain" - Bob Dylan (3:23)
12. "Watching the Wheels" - John Lennon (3:32)
13. "Philosophers Stone" - Van Morrison (6:03)

== Reception ==
=== Box office ===
In its opening weekend, Wonder Boys opened at No. 7 in the US and Canadian box office and grossed a total of US$5.8 million in 1,253 theaters. It went on to gross $19,393,557 there and $14,033,031 in other countries, for a worldwide total of $33,426,588. Based on a $55 million budget, the film was a box office bomb.

=== Critical response ===
Wonder Boys received largely positive reviews from critics. Rotten Tomatoes reports an 81% "Fresh" rating, based on 123 reviews with an average rating of 7.2/10. The site's consensus states: "Michael Douglas and Tobey Maguire do wonders in this clever dark comedy." On Metacritic, the film has a 73 out of 100 score, based on 36 critics, indicating "generally favorable reviews". Audiences polled by CinemaScore gave the film an average grade of "C" on an A+ to F scale.

In a four-star review, Roger Ebert, film critic of the Chicago Sun-Times, praised Wonder Boys as "the most accurate movie about campus life that I can remember. It is accurate, not because it captures intellectual debate or campus politics, but because it knows two things: (1) Students come and go, but the faculty actually lives there, and (2) many faculty members stay stuck in graduate-student mode for decades".

Emanuel Levy of Variety wrote, "The movie's frivolous touches and eccentric details emphasize its dry, measured wit and the power of comedy to underscore serious ideas. Massively inventive, Wonder Boys is spiked with fresh, perverse humor that flows naturally from the straight-faced playing". A.O. Scott from The New York Times wrote, "The problem is that everyone involved seems to have agreed that it was a great idea for a movie and pretty much left it at that".

In his review for Time, Richard Corliss wrote, "Wonder Boys reminds us of a distant age (the '70s) when bad movies were better: not stupid teen romps but sad, off-kilter studies of adults adrift. It is a rare current example of that endangered species, the honorable failure". Entertainment Weekly gave the film a "C+" rating and Owen Gleiberman wrote, "Curtis Hanson may have wanted to make a movie that gleamed with humanity as much as L.A. Confidential burned with malevolence, but he's so intent on getting us to like his characters that he didn't give them enough juice."

Looking back in his Salon.com review, critic Andrew O'Hehir felt that Hanson, "and cinematographer Dante Spinotti capture both Pittsburgh (one of the most serendipitously beautiful American cities) and the netherworld of boho academia with brilliant precision. If you went to a liberal-arts college anywhere in the United States, then the way Grady's ramshackle house looks in the wake of Crabs' enormous all-night party should conjure up vivid sense-memories".

=== Re-release ===
Theatrical re-release poster

Many critics blamed Paramount's initial ad campaign for the film not finding a mainstream audience. The Wall Street Journal's Joe Morgenstern praised Douglas' work in the film, but criticized the poster, which featured a headshot of Douglas: "a raffishly eccentric role, and he's never been so appealing. (Don't be put off by the movie's cryptic poster, which makes him look like Michael J. Pollard.)" The Los Angeles Times' Kenneth Turan also slammed the poster: "The film's ad poster brings Elmer Fudd to mind." Hanson said that the poster made Douglas look "like he was trying to be Robin Williams". In an interview with Amy Taubin, Hanson said, "The very things that made Michael and I want to do the movie so badly were the reasons it was so tricky to market. Since films go out on so many screens at once, there's a need for instant appeal. But Wonder Boys isn't easily reducible to a single image or a catchy ad line".

Hanson felt that the studio played it safe with the original ad campaign. They also released it a week after the Academy Award nominations were announced and the studio spent more money promoting the films of theirs that were nominated and not enough on Wonder Boys. The studio pulled the film out of theaters and quickly canceled the video release. Hanson and the film's producer Scott Rudin lobbied to have it re-released. They designed a new campaign including posters and a trailer for the re-release that emphasized the ensemble cast.

=== Home media ===
Wonder Boys was released on VHS and DVD by Paramount Home Entertainment in North America, Warner Home Video in international territories, except the United Kingdom, and Universal Pictures Video and Vision Video in the United Kingdom in 2001.

On November 24, 2020, Paramount released Wonder Boys on Blu-ray.

=== Accolades ===
Award	Category	Nominee(s)	Result
Academy Awards	Best Screenplay – Based on Material Previously Produced or Published	Steve Kloves	Nominated
Academy Awards	Best Film Editing	Dede Allen	Nominated
Academy Awards	Best Original Song	"Things Have Changed"; Music and Lyrics by Bob Dylan	Won
American Film Institute Awards	Top 10 Movies of the Year		Won
Art Directors Guild Awards	Excellence in Production Design for a Contemporary Film	Jeannine Oppewall	Nominated
Boston Society of Film Critics Awards	Best Supporting Actress	Frances McDormand (also for Almost Famous)	Won
Boston Society of Film Critics Awards	Best Screenplay	Steve Kloves	Won (Note: Tied with Cameron Crowe for Almost Famous.)
British Academy Film Awards	Best Actor in a Leading Role	Michael Douglas	Nominated
British Academy Film Awards	Best Screenplay – Adapted	Steve Kloves	Nominated
Chicago Film Critics Association Awards	Best Film		Nominated
Chicago Film Critics Association Awards	Best Actor	Michael Douglas	Nominated
Chicago Film Critics Association Awards	Best Screenplay	Steve Kloves	Nominated
Critics' Choice Movie Awards	Top 10 Films		Won
Critics' Choice Movie Awards	Best Picture		Nominated
Critics' Choice Movie Awards	Best Supporting Actress	Frances McDormand (also for Almost Famous)	Won
Critics' Choice Movie Awards	Best Adapted Screenplay	Steve Kloves	Won (Note: Tied with Stephen Gaghan for Traffic.)
Dallas-Fort Worth Film Critics Association Awards	Top 10 Films		8th Place
Dallas-Fort Worth Film Critics Association Awards	Best Film		Nominated
Dallas-Fort Worth Film Critics Association Awards	Best Actor	Michael Douglas	Nominated
Florida Film Critics Circle Awards	Best Supporting Actress	Frances McDormand (also for Almost Famous)	Won
GLAAD Media Awards	Outstanding Film – Wide Release		Nominated
Golden Globe Awards	Best Motion Picture – Drama		Nominated
Golden Globe Awards	Best Actor in a Motion Picture – Drama	Michael Douglas	Nominated
Golden Globe Awards	Best Screenplay – Motion Picture	Steve Kloves	Nominated
Golden Globe Awards	Best Original Song – Motion Picture	"Things Have Changed"; Music and Lyrics by Bob Dylan	Won
Grammy Awards	Best Song Written for a Motion Picture, Television or Other Visual Media	"Things Have Changed"; Music and Lyrics by Bob Dylan	Nominated
L.A. Outfest	Screen Idol Award (Male)	Robert Downey Jr.	Won
Las Vegas Film Critics Society Awards	Best Actor	Michael Douglas (also for Traffic)	Nominated
Las Vegas Film Critics Society Awards	Best Supporting Actress	Frances McDormand (also for Almost Famous)	Nominated
Las Vegas Film Critics Society Awards	Best Screenplay – Adapted from Another Medium	Steve Kloves	Won
Las Vegas Film Critics Society Awards	Best Film Editing	Dede Allen	Nominated
Las Vegas Film Critics Society Awards	Best Original Song	"Things Have Changed"; Music and Lyrics by Bob Dylan	Won
London Film Critics Circle Awards	Actor of the Year	Michael Douglas	Nominated
London Film Critics Circle Awards	Screenwriter of the Year	Steve Kloves	Nominated
Los Angeles Film Critics Association Awards	Best Film		Runner-up
Los Angeles Film Critics Association Awards	Best Actor	Michael Douglas	Won
Los Angeles Film Critics Association Awards	Best Supporting Actress	Frances McDormand (also for Almost Famous)	Won
Los Angeles Film Critics Association Awards	Best Screenplay	Steve Kloves	Runner-up
National Board of Review Awards	Top 10 Films		8th Place
National Society of Film Critics Awards	Best Supporting Actress	Frances McDormand (also for Almost Famous)	2nd Place
National Society of Film Critics Awards	Best Screenplay	Steve Kloves	2nd Place
Online Film & Television Association Awards	Best Actor	Michael Douglas	Nominated
Online Film & Television Association Awards	Best Supporting Actor	Tobey Maguire	Nominated
Online Film & Television Association Awards	Best Adapted Screenplay	Steve Kloves	Won
Online Film & Television Association Awards	Best Casting	Mali Finn	Nominated
Online Film & Television Association Awards	Best Cinematography	Dante Spinotti	Nominated
Online Film & Television Association Awards	Best Original Song	"Things Have Changed"; Music and Lyrics by Bob Dylan	Nominated
Online Film & Television Association Awards	Best Ensemble		Nominated
Online Film Critics Society Awards	Top 10 Films		8th Place
Online Film Critics Society Awards	Best Actor	Michael Douglas	Nominated
Online Film Critics Society Awards	Best Screenplay	Steve Kloves	Nominated
Online Film Critics Society Awards	Best Ensemble		Nominated
Phoenix Film Critics Society Awards	Best Picture		Nominated
Phoenix Film Critics Society Awards	Best Director	Curtis Hanson	Nominated
Phoenix Film Critics Society Awards	Best Actor in a Leading Role	Michael Douglas	Nominated
Phoenix Film Critics Society Awards	Best Actor in a Supporting Role	Tobey Maguire	Nominated
Phoenix Film Critics Society Awards	Best Actress in a Supporting Role	Frances McDormand	Nominated
Phoenix Film Critics Society Awards	Best Adapted Screenplay	Steve Kloves	Nominated
Phoenix Film Critics Society Awards	Best Original Song	"Things Have Changed"; Music and Lyrics by Bob Dylan	Nominated
Satellite Awards	Best Motion Picture – Musical or Comedy		Nominated
Satellite Awards	Best Actor in a Motion Picture – Musical or Comedy	Michael Douglas	Won
Satellite Awards	Best Original Song	"Things Have Changed"; Music and Lyrics by Bob Dylan	Nominated
Southeastern Film Critics Association Awards	Best Picture		7th Place (Note: Tied with Dancer in the Dark.)
Southeastern Film Critics Association Awards	Best Actor	Michael Douglas	Won (Note: Tied with Javier Bardem for Before Night Falls.)
Teen Choice Awards	Choice Movie Liar	Tobey Maguire	Nominated
Toronto Film Critics Association Awards	Best Supporting Actor	Tobey Maguire	Won (Note: Tied with Jeffrey Wright for Shaft.)
USC Scripter Awards		Steve Kloves (screenwriter); Michael Chabon (author)	Won
Writers Guild of America Awards	Best Screenplay – Based on Material Previously Produced or Published	Steve Kloves	Nominated
