= Almost Famous =

2000 film by Cameron Crowe

- Theatrical release poster
- Directed by: Cameron Crowe
- Written by: Cameron Crowe
- Produced by: Cameron Crowe; Ian Bryce
- Starring: Billy Crudup; Frances McDormand; Kate Hudson; Jason Lee; Patrick Fugit; Anna Paquin; Fairuza Balk; Noah Taylor; Philip Seymour Hoffman
- Cinematography: John Toll
- Edited by: Joe Hutshing; Saar Klein
- Music by: Nancy Wilson
- Production companies: DreamWorks Pictures; Vinyl Films
- Distributed by: DreamWorks Distribution LLC (United States and Canada); Columbia Pictures (through Columbia TriStar Film Distributors International; International)
- Release dates: September 8, 2000 (TIFF); September 15, 2000 (United States)
- Running time: 122 minutes
- Country: United States
- Language: English
- Budget: $60 million
- Box office: $47.4 million

Almost Famous is a 2000 American comedy drama film written and directed by Cameron Crowe, starring Billy Crudup, Frances McDormand, Kate Hudson, Patrick Fugit, and Philip Seymour Hoffman. It tells the story of a teenage journalist (Fugit) writing for Rolling Stone magazine in the early 1970s, touring with the fictitious rock band Stillwater, and writing his first cover story on the band. The film is semi-autobiographical, based on Crowe's experiences as a teenage writer for Rolling Stone.

The film performed poorly in theaters, grossing $47.4 million against a $60 million budget. It was widely acclaimed by critics and earned four Academy Award nominations, including a win for Best Original Screenplay. It also won the 2001 Grammy Award for Best Compilation Soundtrack Album for a Motion Picture, Television or Other Visual Media. Roger Ebert hailed it as the best film of the year and the ninth-best film of the 2000s. The film also won two Golden Globe Awards, one for Best Motion Picture – Musical or Comedy and another for Best Supporting Actress – Motion Picture for Hudson.

The film is regarded by some as a cult classic and in a 2016 international poll conducted by the BBC, Almost Famous was ranked the 79th-greatest film since 2000, while it was ranked as the 47th-best film of the 21st century in a 2025 poll by The New York Times. In a Hollywood Reporter 2014 list voted on by "studio chiefs, Oscar winners and TV royalty", Almost Famous was ranked the 71st-greatest film of all time. A stage musical adaptation of the film opened on Broadway in November 2022.

== Plot ==
In 1969 San Diego, child prodigy William Miller struggles to fit in with his peers. His mother Elaine, a widowed college professor, further complicates his life by starting him early in school and leading him to believe he is 13 years old, when he is in fact 11. Furthermore, Elaine's strict ban on rock music and her fear of pop culture have a lasting effect on her two children, finally driving William's 18-year-old sister Anita to move to San Francisco and become a flight attendant.

In 1973, William, now 15 and influenced by Anita's secret cache of rock albums, aspires to be a rock journalist, writing freelance articles for underground music magazines. Impressed by William's writing, rock journalist Lester Bangs gives him a $35 writing assignment to interview Black Sabbath at a concert. William is barred from the backstage until the opening band Stillwater arrives and William flatters his way in. Lead guitarist Russell Hammond takes a liking to William, as does Penny Lane, the leader of a groupie-like collective called "Band-Aids", a term she coined to describe female fans who follow bands to support the music, not just for sex.

After reading some of William's articles in a San Diego underground paper, Rolling Stone editor Ben Fong-Torres hires him to write an article about Stillwater and sends him on the road with the band. William interviews the other band members, but guitarist Russell Hammond avoids a formal sit-down interview. Tensions mount between Hammond and lead singer Jeff Bebe, as the former becomes the more prominent member. The band jokingly refers to journalist William as "the enemy", but he eventually integrates into their inner circle.

Professional road manager Dennis Hope is brought in to handle problems with venues and promoters. He stops the band touring by bus, instead chartering a small plane to play more gigs. Penny has to leave before the band reaches New York, where Russell's girlfriend Leslie is joining them. Penny and three other girls are gambled away to another band in a poker game; Penny acts nonchalant but is devastated.

At a party in a New York restaurant, William informs the group they are being featured on the Rolling Stone cover. Penny shows up uninvited, but leaves after her attempts to get Russell's attention become disruptive. William follows Penny to her hotel, where he saves her from overdosing on quaaludes. The next day, the band encounters severe weather during their flight. Fearing the plane will crash, everyone confesses long-concealed secrets and the simmering conflict between Jeff and Russell erupts. William confesses his love for Penny after Jeff insults her. The plane lands safely, leaving everyone to ponder the changed atmosphere.

Although he has difficulty finishing the article, William arrives at the Rolling Stone office in San Francisco and shocks the staff with his young age. Calling Bangs for help, he advises William to be "honest...and unmerciful" in his piece. The editors are enthused by William's article, but Russell lies to the magazine's fact-checker, claiming most of its content is false. Rolling Stone kills the piece, crushing William. Anita encounters a dejected William at the airport and offers to take him anywhere; he elects to return home to San Diego with her.

After Sapphire, a "Band Aide", chastises Russell for betraying William and mistreating Penny, Russell calls Penny wanting to meet with her, but she instead gives him William's home address. Russell arrives believing it is Penny's house and meets Elaine, before he apologizes to William and finally gives him an interview. He also verifies William's article to Rolling Stone, which runs it as a cover feature. Penny fulfills her long-standing fantasy of going to Morocco, while Stillwater continues to tour by bus.

== Cast ==
- Billy Crudup as Russell Hammond
- Frances McDormand as Elaine Miller
- Kate Hudson as Penny Lane (Lady Goodman)
- Jason Lee as Jeff Bebe
- Patrick Fugit as William Miller
  - Michael Angarano as young William
- Anna Paquin as Polexia Aphrodisia
- Fairuza Balk as Sapphire
- Noah Taylor as Dick Roswell
- Philip Seymour Hoffman as Lester Bangs
- Zooey Deschanel as Anita Miller
- Jimmy Fallon as Dennis Hope
- Bijou Phillips as Estrella Starr
- Terry Chen as Ben Fong-Torres
- Jay Baruchel as Vic Munoz
- Rainn Wilson as David Felton
- Mark Kozelek as Larry Fellows
- Liz Stauber as Leslie Hammond
- Zack Ward as the Legendary Red Dog
- John Fedevich as Ed Vallencourt
- Pauley Perrette as Alice Wisdom
- Eric Stonestreet as Sheldon the desk clerk
- Marc Maron as angry promoter
- Jann Wenner as taxi passenger
- Peter Frampton as Reg
- Mitch Hedberg as Eagles road manager
- Eion Bailey as Jann Wenner

== Production ==
Cameron Crowe used a composite of the bands he had known to create Stillwater, the emerging group that welcomes the young journalist into its sphere, then becomes wary of his intentions. "Stillwater" was the name of a real band signed to Macon, Georgia's Capricorn Records label, which required the film's producers to obtain permission to use the name. In an interview, real Stillwater guitarist Bobby Golden said, "They could have probably done it without permission but they probably would have had a bunch of different lawsuits. Our lawyer got in touch with them. They wanted us to do it for free and I said, 'No we're not doing it for free.' So we got a little bit of change out of it." Seventies rocker Peter Frampton served as a technical consultant on the film. Crowe and his then-wife, musician Nancy Wilson of Heart, co-wrote three of the five Stillwater songs in the film, and Frampton wrote the other two, with Mike McCready of Pearl Jam playing lead guitar on all of the Stillwater songs.

Patrick Fugit, then "a complete unknown from Salt Lake City, Utah", was cast late in the process after Crowe and casting director Gail Levin watched Fugit's self-taped audition.

The character of Russell Hammond was originally set to be played by Brad Pitt. However, during rehearsal prior to filming, Crowe and Pitt mutually decided that it was "not the right fit", and Pitt dropped out of the project. The line "I am a golden god!" in the pool-jumping sequence, as well as numerous references to Russell Hammond being unusually good looking, were written for Pitt but remained in the script after Billy Crudup was cast. In a 2020 interview with The New York Times, Crowe confirmed that the "golden god" scene was inspired by Led Zeppelin lead singer Robert Plant, who had uttered the sentence on a "Riot House" balcony.

Crowe based the character of Penny Lane on the real-life Pennie Lane Trumbull and her group of female promoters who called themselves the "Flying Garter Girls Group". Though they were not in the Flying Garter Girls group, various other women have been described as Crowe's inspiration, for instance Pamela Des Barres and Bebe Buell. Sarah Polley was originally cast as Penny Lane, but, when Brad Pitt dropped out, she dropped out as well. Natalie Portman and Kirsten Dunst were also considered, but Kate Hudson was finally cast for the role. According to Crowe, she "hung in and had turned down leads in other movies just to play the part" and soon obtained it "because of her loyalty". For her performance, Hudson won the Golden Globe Award for Best Supporting Actress and was nominated for an Academy Award for Best Supporting Actress, among others.

The character of William Miller's mother (played by Frances McDormand) was based on Crowe's own mother, who even showed up on the set to keep an eye on him while he worked. Although he asked his mother not to bother McDormand, the two women ended up getting along well. Meryl Streep and Rita Wilson were also considered for the role. For her performance, McDormand was nominated for an Academy Award, a Golden Globe and a BAFTA, among others.

Alice in Chains' guitarist/vocalist Jerry Cantrell was Crowe's first choice for the role of Stillwater bass player Larry Fellows. Cantrell is friends with Crowe and had previously appeared in two films directed by him, Singles (1992) and Jerry Maguire (1996). Cantrell was busy writing the songs for his solo album Degradation Trip and had to turn the role down. Mark Kozelek was cast instead.

Crowe took a copy of the film to London for a special screening with Led Zeppelin members Jimmy Page and Plant. After the screening, Led Zeppelin granted Crowe the right to use one of their songs on the soundtrack—the first time they had ever consented to this since allowing Crowe to use "Kashmir" in Fast Times at Ridgemont High (1982)—and also gave him rights to four of their other songs in the movie itself, although they did not grant him the rights to "Stairway to Heaven" for an intended scene (on the special "Bootleg" edition DVD, the scene is included as an extra, sans the song, where the viewer is instructed by a watermark to begin playing it).

In his 2012 memoir My Cross to Bear, Gregg Allman writes that several aspects of the movie are based on Crowe's time spent with the Allman Brothers Band. The scene in which Russell jumps from the top of the Topeka party house into a pool was based on something Duane Allman did: "the jumping off the roof into the pool, that was Duane—from the third floor of a place called the Travelodge in San Francisco. My brother wanted to do it again, but the cat who owned the place came out shaking his fist, yelling at him. We told that story all the time, and I have no doubt that Cameron was around for it." He also confirms that he and Dickey Betts played a joke on Crowe by claiming clauses in their contract did not allow his story to be published—just before he was to deliver it to Rolling Stone. Ben Fong-Torres, who was the senior editor of Rolling Stone when Crowe worked there, would refute the notion that the magazine would reject an article for publication after the subject denied its contents, similar to what they did to William after Stillwater discredited his article in the film. Fong-Torres stated that the editorial staff would have checked the journalist's notes and tapes, and confront the band as to why they were changing their stories. However, he said he understood why Crowe made that storytelling decision as he needed a crisis at the end of the film's second act. Crowe's book The Uncool reveals that it was Jimmy Page who did not want to grant Crowe an interview because of his disdain for Rolling Stone, which had given Led Zeppelin a bad review when they were starting out.

Filming of the movie lasted 92 days. Some of the filming locations include Ocean Beach, San Diego and Sunset Cliffs.

== Soundtrack ==
The Almost Famous soundtrack album was released by DreamWorks Records on September 12, 2000. It was awarded the 2001 Grammy Award for Best Compilation Soundtrack Album for a Motion Picture, Television or Other Visual Media.

=== Personnel ===
==== "Stillwater" ====
- Jason Lee ("Jeff Bebe") - vocals
- Billy Crudup ("Russell Hammond") - guitar
- Mark Kozelek ("Larry Fellows") - bass guitar
- John Fedevich ("Ed Vallencourt") - drums

==== Other personnel ====
- Nancy Wilson
- Peter Frampton
- Mike McCready
- Jon Bayless
- Ben Smith
- Gordon Kennedy
- Marti Frederiksen – vocals

==== Songs on the soundtrack ====
- Simon & Garfunkel: "America" – 3:37
- The Who: "Sparks" – 3:48
- Todd Rundgren: "It Wouldn't Have Made Any Difference" – 3:51
- Yes: "Your Move" – 3:33
- The Beach Boys: "Feel Flows" – 4:43
- Stillwater: "Fever Dog" – 3:09
- Rod Stewart: "Every Picture Tells a Story" – 5:54
- The Seeds: "Mr Farmer" – 2:51
- The Allman Brothers Band: "One Way Out" – 4:58
- Lynyrd Skynyrd: "Simple Man" – 5:56
- Led Zeppelin: "That's the Way" – 5:36
- Elton John: "Tiny Dancer" – 6:14
- Nancy Wilson: "Lucky Trumble" – 2:41
- David Bowie: "I'm Waiting for the Man" – 4:39
- Cat Stevens: "The Wind" – 1:40
- Clarence Carter: "Slip Away" – 2:31
- Thunderclap Newman: "Something in the Air" – 3:53

== Reception ==
=== Box office ===
Almost Famous had its premiere at the 2000 Toronto International Film Festival. It was subsequently given a limited release on September 15, 2000, in 131 theaters where it grossed $2.3 million on its first weekend. It was given a wider release on September 22, 2000, in 1,193 theaters where it grossed $6.9 million on its opening weekend. The film went on to make $31.7 million in North America and $14.8 million in the rest of the world for a worldwide total of $47.4 million against a $60 million budget.

=== Critical response ===
Almost Famous was acclaimed by a number of critics. On Rotten Tomatoes, the film holds a 91% approval rating, based on 229 reviews, with an average rating of 8.40/10. The site's critical consensus reads, "Almost Famous, with its great ensemble performances and story, is a well-crafted, warm-hearted movie that successfully draws you into its era." On Metacritic it has a score of 90 out of 100, based on 38 reviews, indicating "universal acclaim". Audiences polled by CinemaScore gave the film an average grade of "A−" on an A+ to F scale.

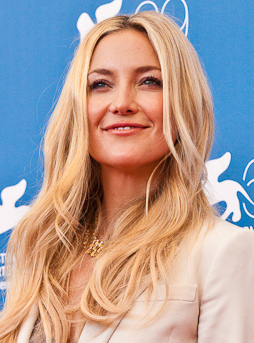
The performances of Kate Hudson and Frances McDormand garnered critical acclaim and were nominated for Academy Awards.

Film critic Roger Ebert gave the film four out of four stars, naming it the best film of 2000, and described it as "funny and touching in so many different ways." In his review for The New York Times, A.O. Scott wrote, "The movie's real pleasures are to be found not in its story but in its profusion of funny, offbeat scenes. It's the kind of picture that invites you to go back and savor your favorite moments like choice album cuts." Richard Corliss of Time praised the film's screenplay for "giving each character his reasons, making everyone in the emotional debate charming and compelling, creating fictional people who breathe in a story with an organic life."

In her review for the L.A. Weekly, Manohla Dargis wrote that "the film shimmers with the irresistible pleasures that define Hollywood at its best—it's polished like glass, funny, knowing and bright, and filled with characters whose lives are invariably sexier and more purposeful than our own." Peter Travers of Rolling Stone wrote, "Not since A Hard Day's Night has a movie caught the thrumming exuberance of going where the music takes you."

In his review for Newsweek, David Ansen wrote, "Character-driven, it relies on chemistry, camaraderie, a sharp eye for detail and good casting." Entertainment Weekly put it on its end-of-the-decade, "best-of" list, saying, "Every Cameron Crowe film is, in one way or another, about romance, rock & roll, and his romance with rock & roll. This power ballad of a movie, from 2000, also happens to be Crowe's greatest (and most personal) film thanks to the golden gods of Stillwater and their biggest fan, Kate Hudson's incomparable Penny Lane."

Entertainment Weekly gave the film an "A−" rating and Owen Gleiberman praised Crowe for depicting the 1970s as "an era that found its purpose in having no purpose. Crowe, staying close to his memories, has gotten it, for perhaps the first time, onto the screen." In his review for the Los Angeles Times, Kenneth Turan praised Philip Seymour Hoffman's portrayal of Lester Bangs: "Superbly played by Philip Seymour Hoffman, more and more the most gifted and inspired character actor working in film, what could have been the clichéd portrait of an older mentor who speaks the straight truth blossoms into a marvelous personality." However, in his review for The New York Observer, Andrew Sarris felt that "none of the non-musical components on the screen matched the excitement of the music. For whatever reason, too much of the dark side has been left out." Desson Howe, in his review for The Washington Post, found it "very hard to see these long-haired kids as products of the 1970s instead of dressed up actors from the Seattle-Starbucks era. I couldn't help wondering how many of these performers had to buy a CD copy of the song and study it for the first time."

In 2021, members of Writers Guild of America West (WGAW) and Writers Guild of America, East (WGAE) ranked its screenplay 9th in WGA’s 101 Greatest Screenplays of the 21st Century (so far).

=== Publication of Rolling Stone article ===
In 2021, Rolling Stone published the article "Stillwater Runs Deep!" by "William Miller", backdated to August 30, 1973.

== Home media ==
Almost Famous was released on DVD and VHS by DreamWorks Home Entertainment on March 13, 2001. In December 2001, an extended cut of the film, also known as the "Bootleg" or "Untitled" version, was released on DVD. The extended version has about 40 minutes of additional footage.

In February 2006, Viacom (now known as Paramount Skydance) acquired the domestic rights to Almost Famous, along with the rights to all 58 other live-action films DreamWorks had released since 1997, following its $1.6 billion acquisition of the company's live-action film assets and television assets. A remastered Blu-ray and Ultra HD Blu-ray of both versions was released by Paramount Home Entertainment on July 13, 2021.

== Stage musical adaptation ==
In 2018, Crowe wrote the stage musical adaptation of the film, and developed the musical numbers with Tom Kitt. It premiered in San Diego at The Old Globe in 2019 with creative work continuing during the COVID-19 pandemic. It moved to Broadway, premiering on November 3, 2022 and closed on January 8th, 2023. The cast of the production, directed by Jeremy Herrin, included newcomer Casey Likes (in his Broadway acting debut) as William Miller, Chris Wood as Russell Hammond, Anika Larsen as Elaine Miller, Solea Pfeiffer as Penny Lane, Drew Gehling as Jeff Bebe, Emily Schultheis as Anita Miller, Jana Djenne Jackson as Polexia Aphrodisia, Katie Ladner as Sapphire, Gerard Canonico as Dick Roswell and Rob Colletti as Lester Bangs.

== See also ==
- 1970s nostalgia
- List of media set in San Diego
