= Traffic (2000 film) =

2000 film by Steven Soderbergh

- Theatrical release poster
- Directed by: Steven Soderbergh
- Screenplay by: Stephen Gaghan
- Based on: Traffik by Simon Moore
- Produced by: Edward Zwick; Marshall Herskovitz; Laura Bickford
- Starring: Don Cheadle; Benicio del Toro; Michael Douglas; Luis Guzmán; Dennis Quaid; Catherine Zeta-Jones
- Cinematography: Peter Andrews
- Edited by: Stephen Mirrione
- Music by: Cliff Martinez
- Production companies: USA Films; Bedford Falls Productions; Laura Bickford Productions; Initial Entertainment Group
- Distributed by: USA Films (United States and Canada); Initial Entertainment Group (International); Universal Music & Video Distribution
- Release date: December 27, 2000 (United States)
- Running time: 147 minutes
- Country: United States
- Languages: English; Spanish
- Budget: $48 million
- Box office: $207.5 million

Traffic is a 2000 American crime drama film directed by Steven Soderbergh and written by Stephen Gaghan. It explores the illegal drug trade from several perspectives: users, enforcers, politicians, and traffickers. Their stories are edited together throughout the film, although most characters do not meet each other. The film is an adaptation of the 1989 British Channel 4 television series Traffik. The film stars an international ensemble cast, including Don Cheadle, Benicio del Toro, Michael Douglas, Erika Christensen, Luis Guzmán, Dennis Quaid, Catherine Zeta-Jones, Jacob Vargas, Tomas Milian, Topher Grace, James Brolin, Steven Bauer, and Benjamin Bratt. It features both English and Spanish-language dialogue.

20th Century Fox, the original financiers of the film, demanded that Harrison Ford play a leading role and that significant changes to the screenplay be made. Soderbergh refused and proposed the script to other major Hollywood studios; it was rejected because of the three-hour running time and the subject matter—Traffic is more of a political film than most Hollywood productions. USA Films, however, liked the project from the start and offered the filmmakers more money than Fox. Soderbergh operated the camera himself and adopted a distinctive color grade for each story line so that audiences could tell them apart.

Traffic was released in the United States on December 27, 2000, and received critical acclaim for Soderbergh's direction, the film's style, complexity, messages, and the cast's performances (particularly del Toro's). Traffic earned numerous awards, including four Oscars (from five nominations): Best Director for Steven Soderbergh, Best Supporting Actor for Benicio del Toro, Best Adapted Screenplay for Stephen Gaghan and Best Film Editing for Stephen Mirrione. It was also a commercial success with a worldwide box-office revenue total of $207.5 million, well above its estimated $48 million budget.

In 2004, USA Network ran a miniseries—also called Traffic—based on the film and the 1989 British television series.

== Plot ==
=== Mexico story line ===
In Mexico, police officers Javier Rodriguez and Manolo Sanchez stop a drug transport. General Salazar, a high-ranking Mexican official, interrupts their arrest to offer Javier a special assignment: apprehending Francisco Flores, a hitman for the Tijuana Cartel, headed by the Obregón brothers.

In Tijuana, under torture, Flores gives Salazar the names of Obregón cartel members, who are arrested. Javier and Salazar's efforts cripple the Obregóns' cocaine outfit, but Javier discovers that Salazar is a pawn of the rival Juárez Cartel; Salazar's anti-drug campaign is a charade to wipe out the Juárez Cartel's competitors.

Sanchez attempts to sell information about Salazar's true affiliation to the Drug Enforcement Administration, but Salazar has him murdered in the desert with Javier forced to watch. Javier had also been working on arranging a deal with the DEA to testify against Salazar in exchange for electricity in his neighborhood to keep local children from being tempted by street gangs and crime. Salazar's secrets are revealed, and he is arrested.

Javier makes a statement to the media about the widespread corruption in the police force and army. Later, Javier watches as children play baseball at night in their new stadium.

=== Wakefield story line ===
Robert Wakefield, a conservative Ohio judge, is appointed to head the President's Office of National Drug Control Policy as drug czar, though he is warned that the war on drugs is unwinnable. Meanwhile, Robert's teenage daughter Caroline has been using cocaine, methamphetamine, and heroin, developing a drug addiction after her boyfriend Seth introduces her to freebasing. Caroline, Seth, and their friend Vanessa are arrested when they try to dump an overdosing fellow student at a hospital. Robert and his wife Barbara struggle to deal with Caroline's addiction, which Barbara has secretly known about for months.

Robert finds himself caught between his demanding new position and difficult family life. Visiting Mexico, he is encouraged by Salazar's successful efforts in hurting the Obregón brothers. Returning to Ohio, Robert learns that Caroline has run away to Cincinnati after stealing money from her parents to pay for drugs.

Dragging Seth along, Robert searches Cincinnati for his daughter. After a drug dealer who is prostituting Caroline refuses to reveal her whereabouts, Robert breaks into a seedy hotel room and finds a semi-conscious Caroline in the company of an older man. In Washington, D.C. to present a "10-point plan" to win the war on drugs, Robert falters halfway through the speech, and tells the press that the war on drugs implies a war on one's own family, which he cannot endorse. Later, Robert and Barbara attend a Narcotics Anonymous meeting with Caroline, telling the other attendees that they are "here to listen".

=== Ayala/DEA story line ===
In San Diego, an undercover DEA investigation led by Montel Gordon and Ray Castro leads to the arrest of Eduardo Ruiz, a dealer posing as a fisherman. Ruiz gives up his boss, drug lord Carl Ayala, the Obregóns' biggest distributor in the United States. Ayala is indicted by a tough prosecutor, hand-selected by Robert Wakefield to send a message to the cartels.

As Ayala's trial begins, his pregnant wife Helena learns of her husband's true profession from his associate, Arnie Metzger. Facing the prospect of life imprisonment for her husband and death threats against her child, Helena hires Flores to assassinate Ruiz and end the trial nolle prosequi. Flores plants a car bomb, but he is killed by a sniper in retaliation for his cooperation with General Salazar, and the bomb meant to kill Ruiz instead kills Agent Castro.

Knowing Ruiz will soon testify, Helena makes a deal with Juan Obregón, who forgives the Ayala family's debt and has Ruiz poisoned. Ayala is released, and he deduces that Metzger accepted $3 million to inform on Ruiz to the FBI and facilitate Ayala's downfall; Metzger is later visited by armed men. Soon after Ayala's release, Gordon bursts into his homecoming celebration and is forced out. Having planted a listening device under Ayala's desk, Gordon smiles as he walks away.

== Relationship to actual events ==
Some aspects of the plotline are based on actual people and events:

- The character General Arturo Salazar is closely modeled after Mexican General Jesús Gutiérrez Rebollo, who was secretly on the payroll of Amado Carrillo Fuentes, head of the Juárez Cartel.
- The character Porfirio Madrigal is modeled after Fuentes.
- The Obregón brothers are modeled after the Tijuana Cartel's Arellano Félix brothers.

At one point in the film, an El Paso Intelligence Center agent tells Robert his position, official in charge of drug control, does not exist in Mexico. As noted in the original script, a Director of the Instituto Nacional para el Combate a las Drogas was created by the Attorney General of Mexico in 1996.

== Cast ==
- Benicio del Toro as Javier Rodríguez Rodríguez, officer of the Mexican Federal Police and police partner of Manolo Sánchez
- Jacob Vargas as Manolo Sánchez, officer of the Mexican Federal Police and police partner of Javier Rodríguez
- Marisol Padilla Sánchez as Ana Sánchez, Manolo's wife
- Tomas Milian as General Arturo Salazar, a corrupt general of the Mexican Army who has ties with Porfirio Madrigal, head of the powerful Juárez Cartel
- Jose Yenque as Salazar Soldier / The Torturer
- Michael Douglas as Robert Wakefield, a powerful judge from Ohio and Caroline's father
- Amy Irving as Barbara Wakefield, Robert Wakefield's wife
- Erika Christensen as Caroline Wakefield, Robert's privileged yet emotionally troubled daughter who falls into drug addiction.
- Topher Grace as Seth Abrahams, Caroline's drug-using boyfriend
- D. W. Moffett as Jeff Sheridan
- James Brolin as General Ralph Landry, Robert's predecessor
- Albert Finney as White House Chief of Staff
- Steven Bauer as Carlos Ayala, a notorious and powerful drug lord from Mexico
- Catherine Zeta-Jones as Helena Ayala, Carlos Ayala's pregnant wife
- Dennis Quaid as Arnie Metzger, Carlos Ayala's crime partner
- Clifton Collins Jr. as Francisco "Frankie Flowers" Flores, a sicario who works for the Obregón brothers, the heads of the powerful Tijuana Cartel
- Don Cheadle as Montel Gordon, DEA agent and Ray's fellow undercover partner
- Luis Guzmán as Ray Castro, DEA agent and Montel's fellow undercover partner
- Miguel Ferrer as Eduardo Ruiz, a drug dealer who works for Carlos Ayala
- Peter Riegert as Michael Adler
- Benjamin Bratt as Juan Obregón, a powerful Mexican drug lord, one of the Obregón brothers and the head of Tijuana Cartel
- Viola Davis as the Social Worker
- John Slattery as Assistant District Attorney Dan Colier
- James Pickens Jr. as The Prosecutor
- Salma Hayek as Rosario (uncredited)
- Michael O'Neill as Lawyer Rodman
- Yul Vazquez as Tigrillo / Obregón Assassin
- Jack Conley as Agent Hughes
- Eddie Velez as Agent Johnson
- James Lew as DEA Agent - CalTrans
- Enrique Murciano as DEA Agent - Trailer
- Carl Ciarfalio as Ruiz's Assistant
- Rick Avery as DEA Agent - Public Storage
- Majandra Delfino as Vanessa
- Alec Roberts as David Ayala
- Rena Sofer as Helena's Friend
- Stacey Travis as Helena's Friend
- Brandon Keener as Tourist Man
- Stephen Dunham as Lobbyist
- Margaret Travolta as Economist
- Mike Siegel as DEA Representative
- Jsu Garcia as Pablo Obregón
- Kaizaad Navroze Kotwal as Teacher
- Governor Bill Weld as Himself
- Senator Don Nickles as Himself
- Senator Harry Reid as Himself
- Senator Barbara Boxer as Herself
- Senator Orrin Hatch as Himself
- Senator Charles Grassley as Himself
- David Bickford as Stan (uncredited)

== Production ==
=== Development ===
Steven Soderbergh had been interested in making a film about the drug wars for some time but did not want to make one about addicts. Producer Laura Bickford obtained the rights to the British television miniseries Traffik (1989) and liked its structure. Soderbergh, who had seen the miniseries in 1990, started looking for a screenwriter to adapt it into a film. They read a script by Stephen Gaghan called Havoc, about upper-class white kids in Palisades High School doing drugs and getting involved with gangs. Soderbergh approached Gaghan to work on his film but found he was already developing a film about drugs for producer/director Edward Zwick. Bickford and Soderbergh approached Zwick, who agreed to merge the two projects and come aboard as a producer.

Traffic was originally going to be distributed by 20th Century Fox, but it was put into turnaround unless actor Harrison Ford agreed to star. Soderbergh began shopping the film to other studios, but when Ford suddenly showed interest in Traffic, Fox's interest in the film was renewed; the studio took it out of turnaround. Fox CEO Bill Mechanic championed the film, but he departed from the studio by the time the first draft was finished. It went back into turnaround. Mechanic had also wanted to make some changes to the script, but Soderbergh disagreed and decided to shop the film to other major studios. They all turned him down because they were not confident in the prospects of a three-hour film about drugs, according to Gaghan. USA Films, however, had wanted to take on the movie from the first time Soderbergh approached them. They provided the filmmakers with a $46 million budget, a considerable increase from the $25 million which Fox offered.

=== Screenplay ===
Soderbergh had "conceptual discussions" with Gaghan while he was shooting The Limey in October 1998; they finished the outline before he went off to shoot Erin Brockovich. After Soderbergh was finished with that film, Gaghan had written a first draft in six weeks that was 165 pages long. After the film was approved for production, Soderbergh and Gaghan met two separate times for three days to reformat the script. The draft they shot had 163 pages with 135 speaking parts and featured seven cities. The film shortens the story line of the original miniseries; a significant character arc of a farmer is taken out, and the Pakistani plotline is replaced with one set in Mexico.

=== Casting ===
Harrison Ford was initially considered for the role of Robert Wakefield in January 2000 but would have had to take a significant cut in his usual $20 million salary. Ford met with Soderbergh to flesh out the character. Gaghan agreed to rework the role, adding several scenes to the screenplay. On February 20, Ford turned down the role, and the filmmakers brought it back to Michael Douglas, who had turned down an earlier draft. He liked the changes and agreed to star, which helped greenlight the project. Gaghan believes Ford turned down the role because he wanted to "reconnect with his action fans".

The filmmakers sent out letters to many politicians, both Democrat and Republican, asking them to make cameo appearances in the film. Several of the scenes had already been shot using actors in these roles, but the filmmakers went back and reshot those scenes when real politicians agreed to be in the film. Those who agreed, including U.S. Senators Harry Reid, Barbara Boxer, Orrin Hatch, Charles Grassley, and Don Nickles, and Massachusetts governor Bill Weld, were filmed in a scene that was entirely improvised.

=== Pre-production ===
The project was obtained from Fox by Initial Entertainment Group and was sold to USA Films by IEG for North American rights only. Steven Soderbergh never approached USA Films, and Initial Entertainment Group fully funded the film.

After Fox dropped the film in early 2000, and before USA Films expressed interest, Soderbergh paid for pre-production with his own money. USA Films agreed to give him the final cut on Traffic and also agreed to his term that all the Mexican characters would speak Spanish while talking to each other. This meant that almost all of Benicio del Toro's dialogue would be subtitled. Once the studio realized this, they suggested that his scenes be shot in English and Spanish, but Soderbergh and del Toro rejected the suggestion. Del Toro, a native of Puerto Rico, was worried that another actor would be brought in and re-record his dialogue in English after he had worked hard to master Mexican inflections and improve his Spanish vocabulary. Del Toro remembers: "Can you imagine? You do the whole movie, bust your butt to get it as realistic as possible, and someone dubs your voice? I said, 'No way. Over my dead body.' Steven was like, 'Don't worry. It's not gonna happen.'" The director fought for subtitles for the Mexico scenes, arguing that if the characters did not speak Spanish, the film would have no integrity and would not convincingly portray what he described as the "impenetrability of another culture".

The filmmakers went to the Drug Enforcement Administration (DEA) and U.S. Customs early on with the script; they told them that they were trying to present as detailed and accurate a picture of the current drug war as possible. The DEA and Customs pointed out inaccuracies in the script. In addition, they gave the production team access to the border checkpoint to Mexico, as shown in the film during the scene in which Wakefield and his people talk with border officials. Despite the assistance, the DEA did not try to influence the script's content. Soderbergh said Traffic had influences from the films of Richard Lester and Jean-Luc Godard. He also spent time analyzing The Battle of Algiers and Z, which, according to the director, had the feeling that the footage was "caught" and not staged. Another inspiration was Alan J. Pakula's film All the President's Men because of its ability to tackle serious issues while being entertaining. In the opening credits of the film, Soderbergh tried to replicate the typeface from All the President's Men and the placement on-screen at the bottom left-hand corner. Analyzing this film helped the director deal with the large cast and working in many different locations for Traffic.

=== Principal photography ===
Half of the first day's footage came out overexposed and unusable. Before the financiers or studio bosses knew about the problem, Soderbergh was already doing reshoots. The insurers made him agree that any further mishaps resulting in additional filming would come from the director's pocket. Soderbergh shot in various cities in California, Ohio, and Texas, on a 54-day schedule and came in $2 million under budget. The director acted as his cinematographer under the pseudonym Peter Andrews and operated the camera himself to "get as close to the movie as I can" and to eliminate the distance between the actors and himself. Soderbergh drew inspiration from the cinema verite style of Ken Loach's films, studying the framing of scenes, the distance of the camera to the actors, lens length, and the tightness of eyelines depending on the position of a character. Soderbergh remembers, "I noticed that there's a space that's inviolate, that if you get within something, you cross the edge into a more theatrical aesthetic as opposed to a documentary aesthetic". Most of the day was spent shooting because a lot of the film was shot with available light.

For the hand-held camera footage, Soderbergh used Panavision Millennium XLs that were smaller and lighter than previous cameras and allowed him to move freely. He adopted a distinctive look for each to tell the three stories apart. For Robert Wakefield's story, Soderbergh used tungsten film with no filter for a cold, monochrome blue feel. For Helena Ayala's story, Soderbergh used diffusion filters, flashing the film and overexposing it for a warmer feel. For Javier Rodriguez's story, the director used tobacco filters and a 45-degree shutter angle whenever possible to produce a strobe-like sharp feeling. Then, he took the entire film through an Ektachrome step, which increased the contrast and grain significantly. He wanted different looks for each story because the audience had to keep track of many characters and absorb a lot of information, and he did not want them to have to figure out which story they were watching.

Benicio del Toro had significant input into certain parts of the film; for example, he suggested a more straightforward, concise way of depicting his character kidnapping Francisco Flores that Soderbergh ended up using. The director cut a scene from the screenplay in which Robert Wakefield smokes crack after finding it in his daughter's bedroom. After rehearsing this scene with the actors, he felt that the character would not do it; after consulting with Gaghan, the screenwriter agreed, and the filmmakers cut the scene shortly before it was scheduled to be shot.

Rancho Bernardo, Balboa Park, downtown San Diego and La Jolla were utilized as the environment for the film.

=== Post-production ===
The first cut of Traffic ran three hours and ten minutes. Soderbergh cut it to two hours and twenty minutes. Early on, there were concerns that the film might get an NC-17 rating, and he was prepared to release it with that rating, but the MPAA assigned it an R. According to a USA Films executive, Jack Valenti, President of the MPAA, agreed to give it an R rating based on the film's importance as "message-powered entertainment."

== Reception ==
=== Box office ===
Traffic was given a limited release on December 27, 2000, in four theaters where it grossed US$184,725 on its opening weekend. It was given a wide release on January 5, 2001, in 1,510 theaters, grossing $15.5 million on its opening weekend. The film made $124.1 million in North America and $83.4 million in foreign markets for a worldwide total of $207.5 million, well above its estimated $46 million budget.

=== Critical response ===
On Rotten Tomatoes, the film holds an approval rating of 93% based on 225 reviews, with an average rating of 8.6/10. The site's critical consensus reads: "Soderbergh successfully pulls off the highly ambitious Traffic, a movie with three different stories and a very large cast. The issues of ethics are gray rather than black-and-white, with no clear-cut good guys. Terrific acting all around." On Metacritic, the film has received an average score of 86 out of 100, based on 34 critics, indicating "universal acclaim". Audiences polled by CinemaScore gave the film an average grade of "B" on an A+ to F scale.

Film critic Roger Ebert gave the film four out of four stars, and wrote: "The movie is powerful precisely because it doesn't preach. It is so restrained that at one moment—the judge's final speech—I wanted one more sentence, making a point, but the movie lets us supply that thought for ourselves". Stephen Holden, in his review for The New York Times, wrote: "Traffic is an utterly gripping, edge-of-your-seat thriller. Or rather it is several interwoven thrillers, each with its own tense rhythm and explosive payoff". In his review for The New York Observer, Andrew Sarris wrote: "Traffic marks [Soderbergh] definitively as an enormous talent, one who never lets us guess what he's going to do next. The promise of Sex, Lies, and Videotape has been fulfilled".

Entertainment Weekly gave the film an "A" rating and praised Benicio del Toro's performance, which critic Owen Gleiberman called, "haunting in his understatement, [it] becomes the film's quietly awakening moral center". Desson Howe, in his review for the Washington Post, wrote: "Soderbergh and screenwriter Stephen Gaghan, who based this on a British television miniseries of the same name, have created an often exhilarating, soup-to-nuts exposé of the world's most lucrative trade". In his review for Rolling Stone, Peter Travers wrote: "The hand-held camerawork – Soderbergh himself did the holding—provides a documentary feel that rivets attention". However, Richard Schickel of Time, in a rare negative review, finds the film's biggest weakness to be that it contains the "cliches of a hundred crime movies" before concluding that "Traffic, for all its earnestness, does not work. It leaves one feeling restless and dissatisfied". In an interview, director Ingmar Bergman lauded the film as "amazing".

=== Accolades ===
Steven Soderbergh received dual nominations for Best Director that year for both Erin Brockovich and Traffic, winning the award for the latter.

Award	Category	Nominee(s)	Result	Ref.
Academy Awards	Best Picture	Marshall Herskovitz, Edward Zwick, and Laura Bickford	Nominated	
Academy Awards	Best Director	Steven Soderbergh	Won	
Academy Awards	Best Supporting Actor	Benicio del Toro	Won	
Academy Awards	Best Screenplay – Based on Material Previously Produced or Published	Stephen Gaghan	Won	
Academy Awards	Best Film Editing	Stephen Mirrione	Won	
ALMA Awards	Outstanding Feature Film		Won	
ALMA Awards	Outstanding Latino Cast in a Feature Film		Won	
ALMA Awards	Outstanding Soundtrack or Compilation for Television and Film		Nominated	
Amanda Awards	Best Foreign Feature Film	Steven Soderbergh	Nominated	
American Cinema Editors Awards	Best Edited Feature Film – Dramatic	Stephen Mirrione	Nominated	
American Film Institute Awards	Top 10 Movies of the Year		Won	
Artios Awards	Outstanding Achievement in Feature Film Casting – Drama	Debra Zane	Won	
Berlin International Film Festival	Golden Bear	Steven Soderbergh	Nominated	
Berlin International Film Festival	Best Actor	Benicio del Toro	Won	
Black Reel Awards	Best Supporting Actor	Don Cheadle	Won	
Blockbuster Entertainment Awards	Favorite Actor – Drama	Michael Douglas	Nominated	
Blockbuster Entertainment Awards	Favorite Supporting Actor – Drama	Benicio del Toro	Won	
Blockbuster Entertainment Awards	Favorite Supporting Actress – Drama	Catherine Zeta-Jones	Nominated	
BMI Film & TV Awards	Film Music Award	Cliff Martinez	Won	
Bodil Awards	Best American Film		Nominated	
Boston Society of Film Critics Awards	Best Director	Steven Soderbergh	3rd Place	
British Academy Film Awards	Best Direction	Steven Soderbergh	Nominated	
British Academy Film Awards	Best Actor in a Supporting Role	Benicio del Toro	Won	
British Academy Film Awards	Best Adapted Screenplay	Stephen Gaghan	Won	
British Academy Film Awards	Best Editing	Stephen Mirrione	Nominated	
British Society of Cinematographers Awards	Best Cinematography in a Theatrical Feature Film	Steven Soderbergh	Nominated	
César Awards	Best Foreign Film	Anthony Minghella	Nominated	
Chicago Film Critics Association Awards	Best Film		Nominated	
Chicago Film Critics Association Awards	Best Director	Steven Soderbergh	Won	
Chicago Film Critics Association Awards	Best Supporting Actor	Benicio del Toro	Won	
Chicago Film Critics Association Awards	Best Supporting Actress	Catherine Zeta-Jones	Nominated	
Chicago Film Critics Association Awards	Best Screenplay	Stephen Gaghan	Nominated	
Chicago Film Critics Association Awards	Best Cinematography	Steven Soderbergh	Nominated	
Chlotrudis Awards	Best Movie		Nominated	
Chlotrudis Awards	Best Director	Steven Soderbergh	Nominated	
Chlotrudis Awards	Best Supporting Actor	Benicio del Toro	Won	
Chlotrudis Awards	Best Adapted Screenplay	Stephen Gaghan	Nominated	
Chlotrudis Awards	Best Cast		Nominated	
Costume Designers Guild Awards	Excellence in Contemporary Film	Louise Frogley	Nominated	
Critics' Choice Movie Awards	Top 10 Films		Won	
Critics' Choice Movie Awards	Best Picture		Nominated	
Critics' Choice Movie Awards	Best Director	Steven Soderbergh (also for Erin Brockovich)	Won	
Critics' Choice Movie Awards	Best Supporting Actor	Benicio del Toro	Nominated	
Critics' Choice Movie Awards	Best Adapted Screenplay	Stephen Gaghan	Won (Note: Tied with Steve Kloves for Wonder Boys.)	
Dallas-Fort Worth Film Critics Association Awards	Top 10 Films		Won	
Dallas-Fort Worth Film Critics Association Awards	Best Film		Won	
Dallas-Fort Worth Film Critics Association Awards	Best Director	Steven Soderbergh	Won	
Dallas-Fort Worth Film Critics Association Awards	Best Supporting Actor	Benicio del Toro	Nominated	
Dallas-Fort Worth Film Critics Association Awards	Best Supporting Actress	Catherine Zeta-Jones	Nominated	
Directors Guild of America Awards	Outstanding Directorial Achievement in Motion Pictures	Steven Soderbergh	Nominated	
Edgar Allan Poe Awards	Best Motion Picture	Stephen Gaghan (screenplay); Simon Moore (based on the miniseries)	Won	
Empire Awards	Best Director	Steven Soderbergh	Nominated	
Empire Awards	Best Actor	Benicio del Toro	Nominated	
Empire Awards	Best British Actress	Catherine Zeta-Jones	Nominated	
Film Critics Circle of Australia Awards	Best Foreign Film		Won	
Florida Film Critics Circle Awards	Best Film		Won	
Florida Film Critics Circle Awards	Best Director	Steven Soderbergh (also for Erin Brockovich)	Won	
Florida Film Critics Circle Awards	Best Supporting Actor	Benicio del Toro	Won	
Gold Derby Awards	Best Supporting Actor of the Decade	Benicio del Toro	Nominated	
Golden Globe Awards	Best Motion Picture – Drama		Nominated	
Golden Globe Awards	Best Supporting Actor – Motion Picture	Benicio del Toro	Won	
Golden Globe Awards	Best Supporting Actress – Motion Picture	Catherine Zeta-Jones	Nominated	
Golden Globe Awards	Best Director – Motion Picture	Steven Soderbergh	Nominated	
Golden Globe Awards	Best Screenplay – Motion Picture	Stephen Gaghan	Won	
Golden Reel Awards	Best Sound Editing – Dialogue & ADR, Domestic Feature Film	Larry Blake and Aaron Glascock	Nominated	
Grammy Awards	Best Score Soundtrack Album for a Motion Picture, Television or Other Visual Media	Cliff Martinez	Nominated	
Humanitas Prize	Feature Film	Stephen Gaghan	Nominated	
Imagen Awards	Best Theatrical Feature Film		Nominated	
Kansas City Film Critics Circle Awards	Best Film		Won	
Kansas City Film Critics Circle Awards	Best Director	Steven Soderbergh	Won	
Kansas City Film Critics Circle Awards	Best Supporting Actor	Benicio del Toro	Won	
Kinema Junpo Awards	Best Foreign Language Film	Steven Soderbergh	Won	
Kinema Junpo Awards	Best Foreign Language Film Director	Steven Soderbergh	Won	
Las Vegas Film Critics Society Awards	Best Director	Steven Soderbergh (also for Erin Brockovich)	Won	
Las Vegas Film Critics Society Awards	Best Actor	Michael Douglas	Nominated	
Las Vegas Film Critics Society Awards	Best Supporting Actor	Benicio del Toro	Won	
Las Vegas Film Critics Society Awards	Best Original Screenplay	Stephen Gaghan	Nominated	
Las Vegas Film Critics Society Awards	Best Film Editing	Stephen Mirrione	Nominated	
Los Angeles Film Critics Association Awards	Best Director	Steven Soderbergh (also for Erin Brockovich)	Won	
Los Angeles Film Critics Association Awards	Best Supporting Actor	Benicio del Toro	Runner-up	
Los Angeles Film Critics Association Awards	Best Cinematography	Steven Soderbergh	Runner-up	
Manaki Brothers Film Festival	Golden Camera 300	Steven Soderbergh	Nominated	
MTV Movie Awards	Breakthrough Female Performance	Erika Christensen	Won	
Nastro d'Argento	Best Foreign Director	Steven Soderbergh	Nominated	
National Board of Review Awards	Top Ten Films		2nd Place	
National Board of Review Awards	Best Director	Steven Soderbergh (also for Erin Brockovich)	Won	
National Society of Film Critics Awards	Best Film		2nd Place	
National Society of Film Critics Awards	Best Director	Steven Soderbergh (also for Erin Brockovich)	Won	
National Society of Film Critics Awards	Best Supporting Actor	Benicio del Toro	Won	
National Society of Film Critics Awards	Best Screenplay	Stephen Gaghan	3rd Place	
National Society of Film Critics Awards	Best Cinematography	Steven Soderbergh	3rd Place	
New York Film Critics Circle Awards	Best Film		Won	
New York Film Critics Circle Awards	Best Director	Steven Soderbergh (also for Erin Brockovich)	Won	
New York Film Critics Circle Awards	Best Actor	Benicio del Toro	Runner-up	
New York Film Critics Circle Awards	Best Supporting Actor	Benicio del Toro	Won	
Online Film & Television Association Awards	Best Picture	Marshall Herskovitz, Edward Zwick, and Laura Bickford	Won	
Online Film & Television Association Awards	Best Director	Steven Soderbergh	Nominated	
Online Film & Television Association Awards	Best Supporting Actor	Benicio del Toro	Nominated	
Online Film & Television Association Awards	Best Youth Performance	Erika Christensen	Nominated	
Online Film & Television Association Awards	Best Adapted Screenplay	Stephen Gaghan	Nominated	
Online Film & Television Association Awards	Best Casting	Debra Zane	Won	
Online Film & Television Association Awards	Best Cinematography	Steven Soderbergh	Nominated	
Online Film & Television Association Awards	Best Film Editing	Stephen Mirrione	Nominated	
Online Film & Television Association Awards	Best Sound		Nominated	
Online Film & Television Association Awards	Best Ensemble		Won	
Online Film & Television Association Awards	Best Titles Sequence		Nominated	
Online Film & Television Association Awards	Best Official Film Website		Nominated	
Online Film Critics Society Awards	Top 10 Films		5th Place	
Online Film Critics Society Awards	Best Picture		Nominated	
Online Film Critics Society Awards	Best Director	Steven Soderbergh	Nominated	
Online Film Critics Society Awards	Best Supporting Actor	Benicio del Toro	Won (Note: Tied with Philip Seymour Hoffman for Almost Famous.)	
Online Film Critics Society Awards	Best Screenplay	Stephen Gaghan	Nominated	
Online Film Critics Society Awards	Best Cinematography	Steven Soderbergh	Nominated	
Online Film Critics Society Awards	Best Editing	Stephen Mirrione	Nominated	
Online Film Critics Society Awards	Best Ensemble		Nominated	
Phoenix Film Critics Society Awards	Best Picture		Nominated	
Phoenix Film Critics Society Awards	Best Director	Steven Soderbergh	Won	
Phoenix Film Critics Society Awards	Best Actor in a Supporting Role	Benicio del Toro	Nominated	
Phoenix Film Critics Society Awards	Best Adapted Screenplay	Stephen Gaghan	Nominated	
Phoenix Film Critics Society Awards	Best Cinematography	Steven Soderbergh	Nominated	
Phoenix Film Critics Society Awards	Best Film Editing	Stephen Mirrione	Nominated	
Political Film Society Awards	Exposé		Nominated	
Prism Awards	Theatrical Feature Film		Won	
San Diego Film Critics Society Awards	Best Supporting Actor	Benicio del Toro	Won	
Satellite Awards	Best Motion Picture – Drama		Won	
Satellite Awards	Best Director	Steven Soderbergh	Won	
Satellite Awards	Best Supporting Actor in a Motion Picture – Drama	Benicio del Toro	Nominated	
Satellite Awards	Best Adapted Screenplay	Stephen Gaghan	Nominated	
Satellite Awards	Best Art Direction	Keith P. Cunningham	Nominated	
Satellite Awards	Best Cinematography	Steven Soderbergh	Nominated	
Satellite Awards	Best Editing	Stephen Mirrione	Nominated	
Satellite Awards	Best Original Score	Cliff Martinez	Nominated	
Satellite Awards	Outstanding Motion Picture Ensemble		Won	
Saturn Awards	Best Action/Adventure/Thriller Film		Nominated	
Screen Actors Guild Awards	Outstanding Performance by a Cast in a Motion Picture	Steven Bauer, Benjamin Bratt, James Brolin, Don Cheadle, Erika Christensen, Clifton Collins Jr., Benicio del Toro, Michael Douglas, Miguel Ferrer, Albert Finney, Topher Grace, Luis Guzmán, Amy Irving, Tomas Milian, D. W. Moffett, Dennis Quaid, Peter Riegert, Jacob Vargas, and Catherine Zeta-Jones	Won	
Screen Actors Guild Awards	Outstanding Performance by a Male Actor in a Leading Role	Benicio del Toro	Won	
Southeastern Film Critics Association Awards	Best Picture		2nd Place	
Southeastern Film Critics Association Awards	Best Director	Steven Soderbergh	Won	
Southeastern Film Critics Association Awards	Best Supporting Actor	Benicio del Toro	Won	
Southeastern Film Critics Association Awards	Best Adapted Screenplay	Stephen Gaghan	Won	
Teen Choice Awards	Choice Movie Breakout	Erika Christensen	Nominated	
Toronto Film Critics Association Awards	Best Film		Runner-up	
Toronto Film Critics Association Awards	Best Director	Steven Soderbergh	Won	
Toronto Film Critics Association Awards	Best Male Performance	Benicio del Toro	Won	
Turkish Film Critics Association Awards	Best Foreign Film		2nd Place	
Vancouver Film Critics Circle Awards	Best Film		Won	
Vancouver Film Critics Circle Awards	Best Director	Steven Soderbergh	Won	
Vancouver Film Critics Circle Awards	Best Actor	Benicio del Toro	Won	
Village Voice Film Poll	Best Supporting Performance	Benicio del Toro	Won	
Writers Guild of America Awards	Best Screenplay – Based on Material Previously Produced or Published	Stephen Gaghan	Won	
Young Hollywood Awards	Breakthrough Male Performance	Topher Grace	Won	
Young Hollywood Awards	Standout Female Performance	Erika Christensen	Won	

=== Top ten lists ===
Traffic appeared on several critics' top ten lists for 2000. Some of the notable top-ten list appearances are:

- 2nd: A. O. Scott, The New York Times
- 2nd: Jami Bernard, New York Daily News
- 2nd: Bruce Kirkland, The Toronto Sun
- 3rd: Stephen Holden, The New York Times
- 3rd: Owen Gleiberman, Entertainment Weekly
- 3rd: Peter Travers, Rolling Stone
- 4th: Roger Ebert, Chicago Sun-Times
- 4th: Jack Mathews, New York Daily News

== Home media ==
In the United States, the film was released on DVD on May 28, 2002, by The Criterion Collection. In Australia, Traffic was released on DVD by Village Roadshow, with an MA15+ rating. Despite the Australian packaging stating the length to be 124 minutes, the actual DVD version is just over 141 minutes long. It was released on Blu-ray by Universal Pictures in April 2010 in a 1.85:1 aspect ratio. It was released on Blu-ray by Criterion in January 2012, featuring a new transfer in a 1.78:1 aspect ratio.

== See also ==
- Hyperlink cinema — the film style of using multiple interconnected story lines
- List of media set in San Diego
- Mexican drug war
- Narco film
