= The House of Mirth (2000 film) =

- Film poster
- Directed by: Terence Davies
- Written by: Terence Davies
- Based on: The House of Mirth; 1905 novel by Edith Wharton
- Produced by: Olivia Stewart
- Starring: Gillian Anderson; Dan Aykroyd; Terry Kinney; Anthony LaPaglia; Laura Linney; Elizabeth McGovern; Eric Stoltz
- Cinematography: Remi Adefarasin
- Edited by: Michael Parker
- Production companies: Three Rivers Productions; Granada Film Limited; Showtime
- Distributed by: FilmFour Distributors (United Kingdom); Sony Pictures Classics (United States)
- Release date: 23 September 2000
- Running time: 140 minutes
- Countries: United Kingdom; Germany; United States
- Budget: $10 million
- Box office: $5.1 million

The House of Mirth is a 2000 drama film written and directed by Terence Davies. An adaptation of Edith Wharton's 1905 novel The House of Mirth, the film stars Gillian Anderson. It is an international co-production between the United Kingdom, Germany and the United States. The "misleading title" is derived from a phrase in the Old Testament.

== Plot ==
Lily Bart is an impoverished socialite accustomed to comfort and luxury. Along with her younger cousin, Grace Stepney, she lives with her wealthy aunt, Julia Peniston, who gives Lily a small allowance.

Lily admires lawyer Lawrence Selden, but he is too poor for her to seriously consider marrying. Her choices are limited to Simon Rosedale, a rising financier, and the wealthy Percy Gryce. Lily's friend Judy Trenor urges her to pursue Gryce. Lily, however, prefers Selden, and during a country weekend, they take a walk and kiss. Gryce, with whom Lily has broken two appointments, leaves abruptly. Fearful for her future, a dejected Lily pours out her troubles to Judy's husband, Gus Trenor. He leads her to believe that he will help her earn money through investment. Later, Lily purchases scandalous letters written by Bertha Dorset revealing that Selden was her lover. Lily is hurt, but keeps the letters secret.

At a wedding, Lily receives a $5,000 check from Gus Trenor, who claims to have reinvested another $4,000. Later, he invites Lily to the opera, where she is seen by Julia and Selden as she sits with Trenor and Rosedale. Trenor tricks her into leaving the opera and accompanying him to his home, where he tries to kiss her, claiming that Lily is not playing a fair game when she accepts his money but refuses him her attentions. When Lily arrives home, Julia refuses to lend her the money to repay the $9,000 she received from Trenor. Lily confides in Grace, asking if she should turn to Selden for his understanding, but Grace advises against it; Grace secretly loves Selden. Lily had arranged a later appointment with Selden while at the wedding, and she counts on his love for her to overcome her foolish mistakes.

While Lily is hoping to hear from Selden, Rosedale visits, proposing to her. His wealth could free Lily, yet she rejects his proposal. Bertha Dorset invites Lily to the Dorsets' yacht for a European cruise. Lily accepts, desperate to escape the debts, whispers and criticism in New York.

In Monte Carlo, Mrs. Carry Fisher meets with Selden, who has arrived from London. They are both worried about Lily, travelling on the Dorsets' yacht. Lily and George Dorset converse on deck while a young man reads poetry to Bertha. While ashore that evening, Lily and George look for them in vain before returning to the yacht. Next morning, George enters Lily's cabin, accusing her of knowing about Bertha's indiscretions with the young poet. Lily pleads ignorance of Bertha's behavior. When Bertha returns, Lily confronts her, saying that she can no longer divert George's attention from Bertha's affair. Bertha turns the tables by accusing Lily of adultery with George, since Lily was alone aboard the yacht with him all night.

Back in New York, the Dorsets are still in marital discord and Julia has died. Lily receives only a fraction of Julia's fortune, the bulk having been left to her cousin Grace. Now homeless and adrift, Lily is invited by Carry Fisher to stay with her and the Gormers for the summer. Carry believes that Lily's two possibilities for marriage are George Dorset and Simon Rosedale. George asks Lily for the truth about his wife Bertha's infidelities, but she denies any knowledge of them. In her growing desperation, she approaches Simon Rosedale. He knows about Bertha's letters and advises Lily to use them to force Bertha to restore her social standing. He offers to marry Lily once she and Bertha are reconciled, but Lily refuses.

Lily starts working for the social-climbing Mrs. Hatch as her secretary and companion. Selden says that this hurts Lily's social standing, but she needs the money. They argue and part on bad terms. Lily goes to the pharmacy for Mrs. Hatch's chloral hydrate sleeping medication, and begins taking it herself. After Mrs. Hatch gets into society, she discovers that Lily's reputation is a liability and fires her. Lily gets a job sewing for a milliner, but her growing addiction leads to her being fired for poor work. Lily visits her cousin Grace for a loan but is rejected.

Lily almost confronts Bertha Dorset with the letters written to Selden. Finding that the Dorsets have left town, Lily goes to Selden, saying that she knows that she lost his love. When Selden is not looking, she throws the letters in his lit fireplace. Lily goes home and finds her inheritance has been delivered. She puts the check in an envelope she addresses to her bank, and writes another for Gus Trenor, resolving her massive debt, and then takes a fatal dose of the chloral. Finding the partially-burnt letters and sensing her intentions, Selden rushes to her boarding room. There, at her deathbed, holding her hand, he weeps, declaring his love for her.

== Cast ==
- Gillian Anderson as Lily Bart
- Eric Stoltz as Lawrence Selden
- Dan Aykroyd as Gus Trenor
- Anthony LaPaglia as Simon Rosedale
- Laura Linney as Bertha Dorset
- Terry Kinney as George Dorset
- Eleanor Bron as Mrs. Julia Peniston
- Jodhi May as Grace Stepney
- Elizabeth McGovern as Mrs. Carry Fisher
- Penny Downie as Judy Trenor
- Pearce Quigley as Percy Gryce
- Lorelei King as Mrs. Hatch
- Morag Siller as Mary Lee
- Pamela Dwyer as Edith Fisher

== Production ==
Terence Davies cast Gillian Anderson because of her resemblance to the women in John Singer Sargent paintings. Parts of the film were shot at Gosford House in East Lothian, Scotland, and at Manderston House in the Scottish Borders.

The soundtrack uses three excerpts from Mozart's Così fan tutte: the overture and "La mia Dorabella" during the scene in the opera house, and "Soave sia il vento" during the cruise scene. Also used are the slow movement from Marcello's Oboe Concerto in D minor, the rondo from Rossini's 3rd String Quartet, "Shtiler Shtiler" by Alexander Tamir, the minuet from Haydn's "The Lark" quartet in D major, the fourth movement of "Rothko Chapel" by Morton Feldman, and, during the final credits, the slow movement of Borodin's String Quartet no.2 in D.

Showtime co-produced the film with the initial intent to premiere it on its cable channel. However, the film's strong reception at the Edinburgh Film Festival resulted in Sony Pictures Classics acquiring the rights for a North American theatrical release.

== Release ==
The House of Mirth premiered at the New York Film Festival on 23 September 2000. Sony Pictures Classics released it in the U.S. on 22 December 2000.

== Reception ==
=== Box-office ===
In the U.S., it grossed $48,770 in its opening week-end and $3,043,284 in total. The known world total is $5,164,404.

=== Critical reception ===
On Rotten Tomatoes, The House of Mirth has an 82% approval rating based on 100 reviews, with an average rating of 7.1/10. The site's critics consensus states: "Despite being a period piece, The House of Mirth's depiction of social cruelty still feels chilling and relevant for today." Metacritic rated it 78/100 based on 30 critics' reviews, indicating "generally favorable reviews".

The Guardian critic Peter Bradshaw awarded the film 5/5 stars, writing: "How extraordinary that this is Terence Davies's first film in six years, and only his fifth in a career of 25 years. His signature visual touches are all there: the languorous, unhurried takes on the still-life interiors. But this has been opened out into a substantial, well-upholstered picture with more sinew and power than almost any other period drama of recent times. It gripped me like a thriller throughout: a brilliant new film from a great British director." In Slant Magazine, Ed Gonzales wrote "Besides his remarkable ability to render a profound sense of past in all his films, Davies can uncannily map out the emotions of his characters via his mise-en-scène."

The Washington Post's Michael O'Sullivan wrote "the real revelation here is The X-Files' Anderson, who plays Lily with subtle gradations of emotional depth unexpected from someone who has made a career out of deadpan. When we first meet Lily, her character is all radiant subtext: Her smoldering carnality -- buried beneath a veneer of social-climbing pleasantries -- seeps out in every cigarette she and Lawrence share ... Later, Anderson gives a tour de force as a woman who's at the end of her rope without knowing how she got there."

A reviewer in Sight and Sound commented that Davies preserved the astringent spirit of Wharton's "beady-eyed view of the early 20th-century's nouveaux riches", "handsomely designed" by Don Taylor and "lovingly shot" by Remi Adefarasin. The opening shot of Lily walking alone on a railway platform "emerging from a cloud of railway steam evokes Anna Karenina, and hints proleptically at her sticky end". He commented that Gillian Anderson is "not merely plausible but exceptionally powerful, and [..] makes Lily's final self-lacerating encounter with Selden horribly real", adding that the film's "finest quality is its typically quiet attentiveness to tone of voice, posture, nuances of facial expression - Anderson proves herself a grand mistress of that most elusive look, the crestfallen. It's a remarkable, if sometimes harrowing adaptation: beautifully intelligent, intelligently beautiful."

== Home media ==
The House of Mirth was issued on DVD in the United States and the United Kingdom shortly after its release. A British Film Institute Blu-ray of the movie was released on 24 November 2025 consisting of a new 2K scan of the original 35mm internegative, presented in the original 2.35:1 aspect ratio.

== Awards and nominations ==
Award	Category	Recipient	Result	Ref.
BAFTA Awards	Best British Film	Terence Davies, Olivia Stewart	Nominated	
BAFTA Awards	Best Costume Design	Monica Howe	Nominated	
British Independent Film Awards	Best Actress	Gillian Anderson	Won	
British Independent Film Awards	Best Director	Terence Davies	Nominated	
British Independent Film Awards	Best British Independent Film		Nominated	
Chlotrudis Awards	Audience Award for Best Actress	Gillian Anderson	Won	
Chlotrudis Awards	Audience Award for Best Adapted Screenplay	Terence Davies	Won	
London Film Critics Circle Awards	Actress of the Year	Gillian Anderson	Nominated	
London Film Critics Circle Awards	British Film of the Year		Nominated	
London Film Critics Circle Awards	British Director of the Year	Terence Davies	Nominated	
London Film Critics Circle Awards	British Producer of the Year	Olivia Stewart	Nominated	
Los Angeles Film Critics Association Awards	Best Production Design	Don Taylor	2nd place	
National Society of Film Critics Awards	Best Actress	Gillian Anderson	2nd place	
National Society of Film Critics Awards	Best Film		3rd place	
New York Film Critics Circle Awards	Best Actress	Gillian Anderson	2nd place	
New York Film Critics Circle Awards	Best Director	Terence Davies	3rd place	
New York Film Critics Circle Awards	Best Film		3rd place	
Online Film & Television Association Awards	Best Actress	Gillian Anderson	Nominated	
Online Film & Television Association Awards	Best Writing	Terence Davies	Nominated	
Online Film & Television Association Awards	Best Costume Design	Monica Howe	Nominated	
Online Film & Television Association Awards	Best Production Design	Don Taylor	Nominated	
Satellite Awards	Best Actress in a Motion Picture Drama	Gillian Anderson	Nominated	
Satellite Awards	Best Director	Terence Davies	Nominated	
Satellite Awards	Best Art Direction	Don Taylor	Won	
Satellite Awards	Best Costume Design	Monica Howe	Nominated	
Toronto Film Critics Association Awards	Best Actress	Gillian Anderson	2nd place	
Toronto Film Critics Association Awards	Best Supporting Actress	Laura Linney	Nominated	
USC Scripter Awards		Edith Wharton (author); Terence Davies (screenwriter)	Nominated	
Village Voice Film Poll	Best Lead Performance	Gillian Anderson	Won	
Village Voice Film Poll	Best Screenplay	Terence Davies	3rd place	
Village Voice Film Poll	Best Film		3rd place	
