= 2000 Los Angeles Film Critics Association Awards =

Annual US film awards ceremony

26th LAFCA Awards
- Date: December 2000

Highlights
- Best Picture: Crouching Tiger, Hidden Dragon

The 26th Los Angeles Film Critics Association Awards, honoring the best in film for 2000, were given in December 2000.

== Winners ==
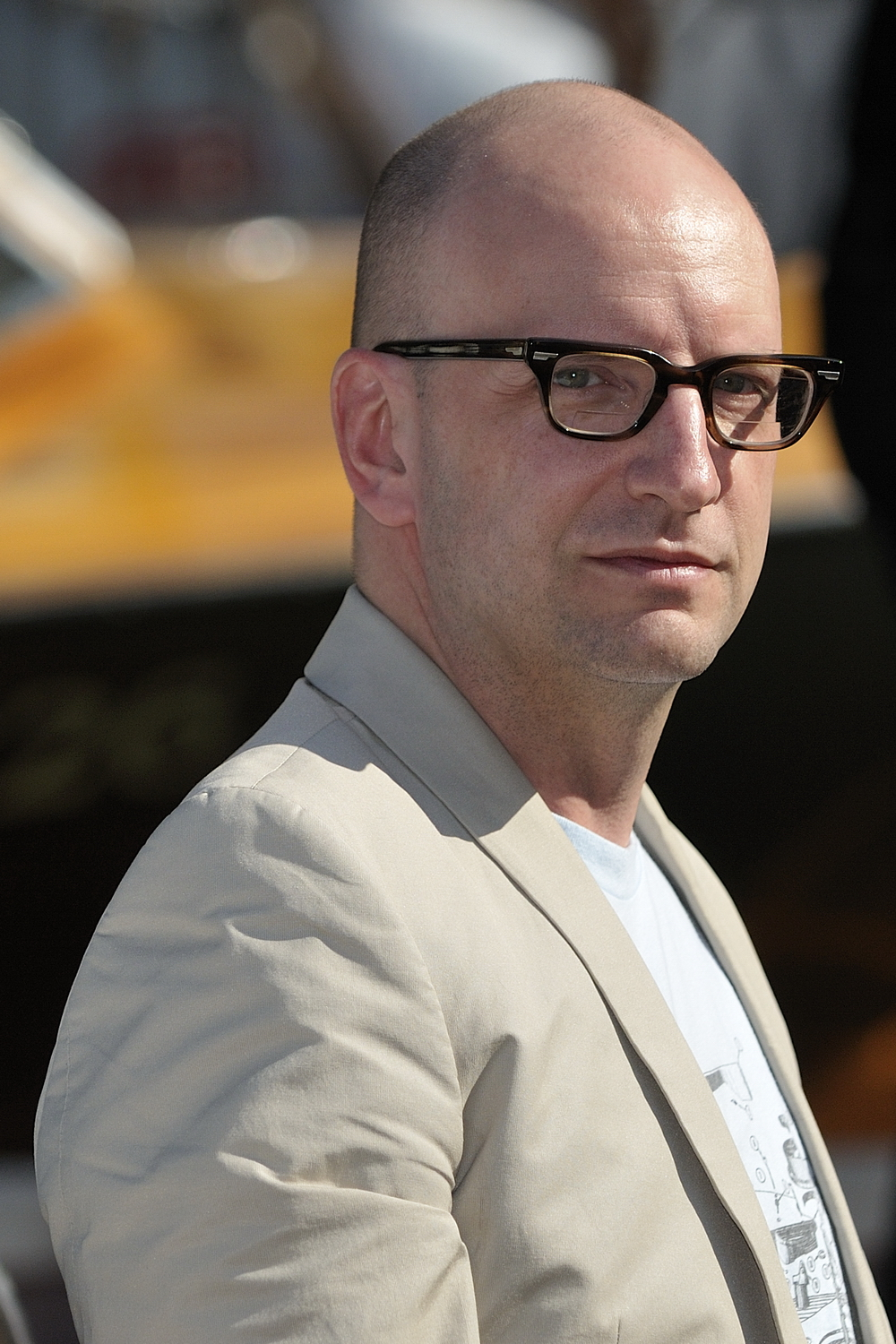
Steven Soderbergh, Best Director winner

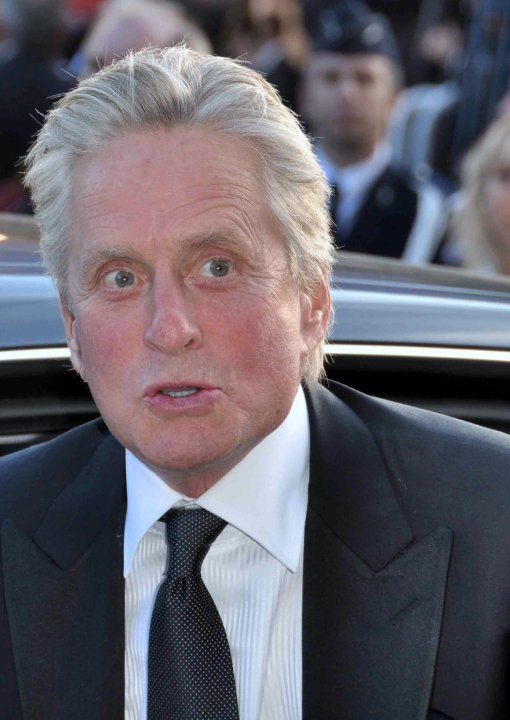
Michael Douglas, Best Actor winner

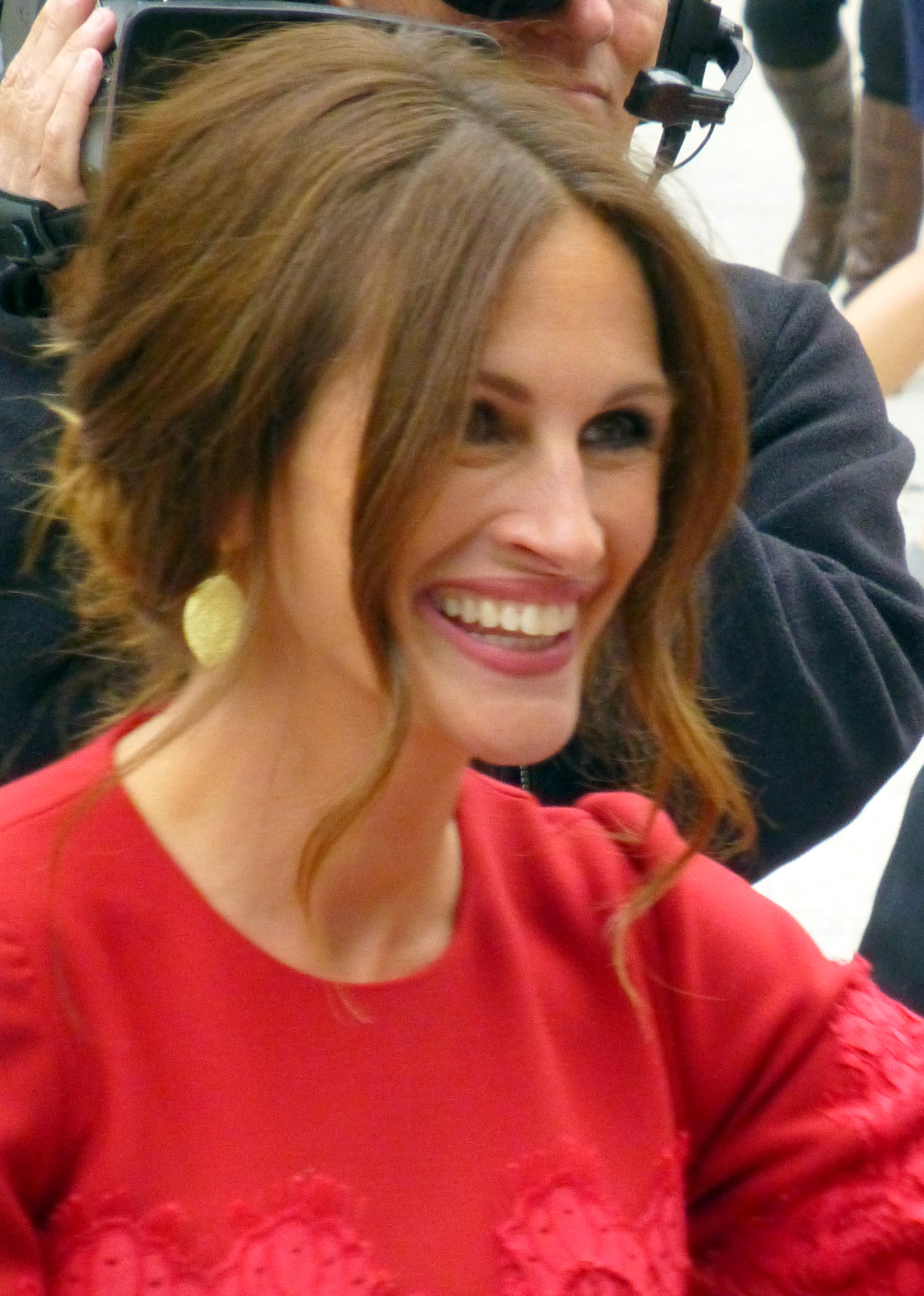
Julia Roberts, Best Actress winner

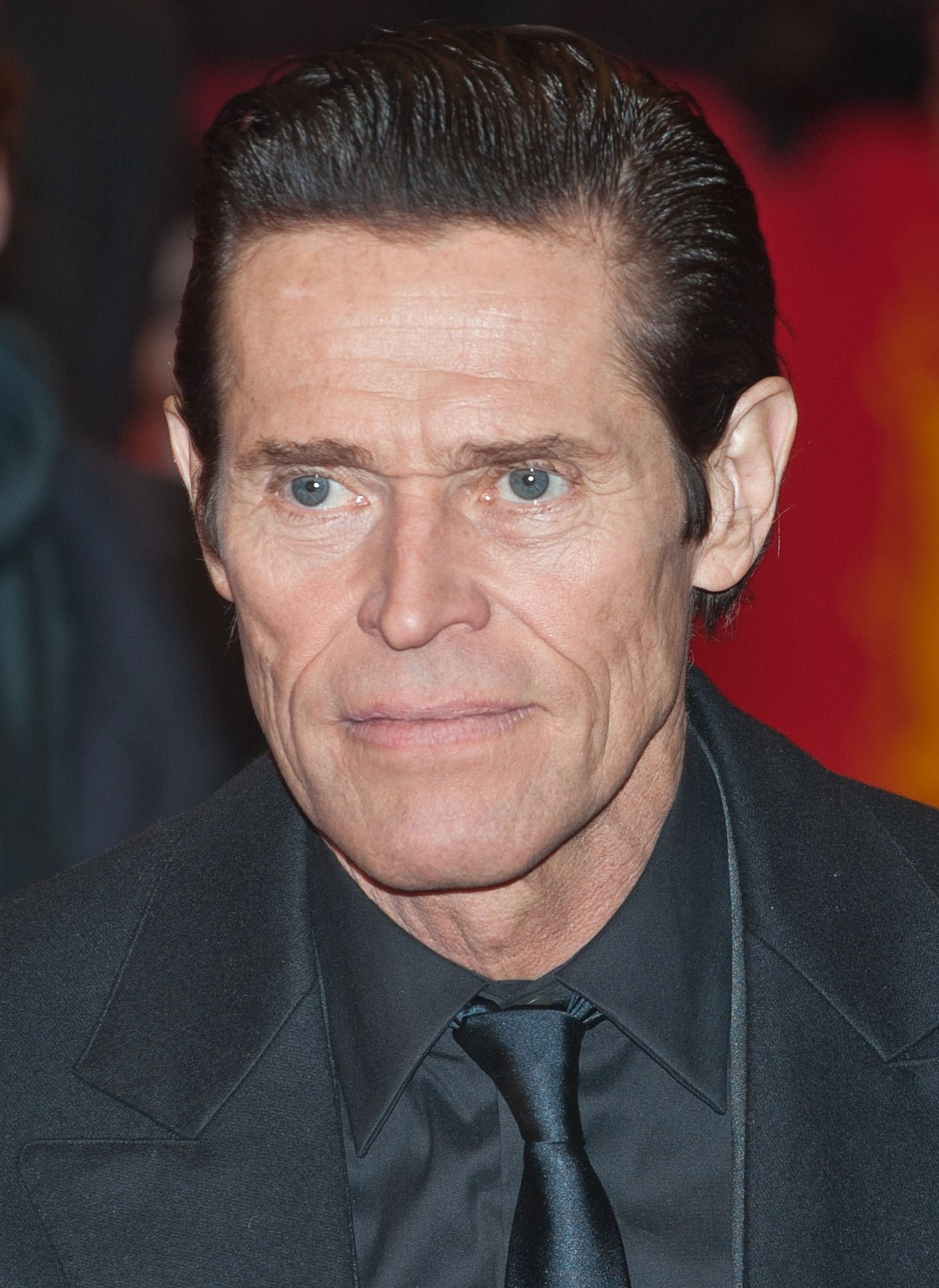
Willem Dafoe, Best Supporting Actor winner

Frances McDormand, Best Supporting Actress winner

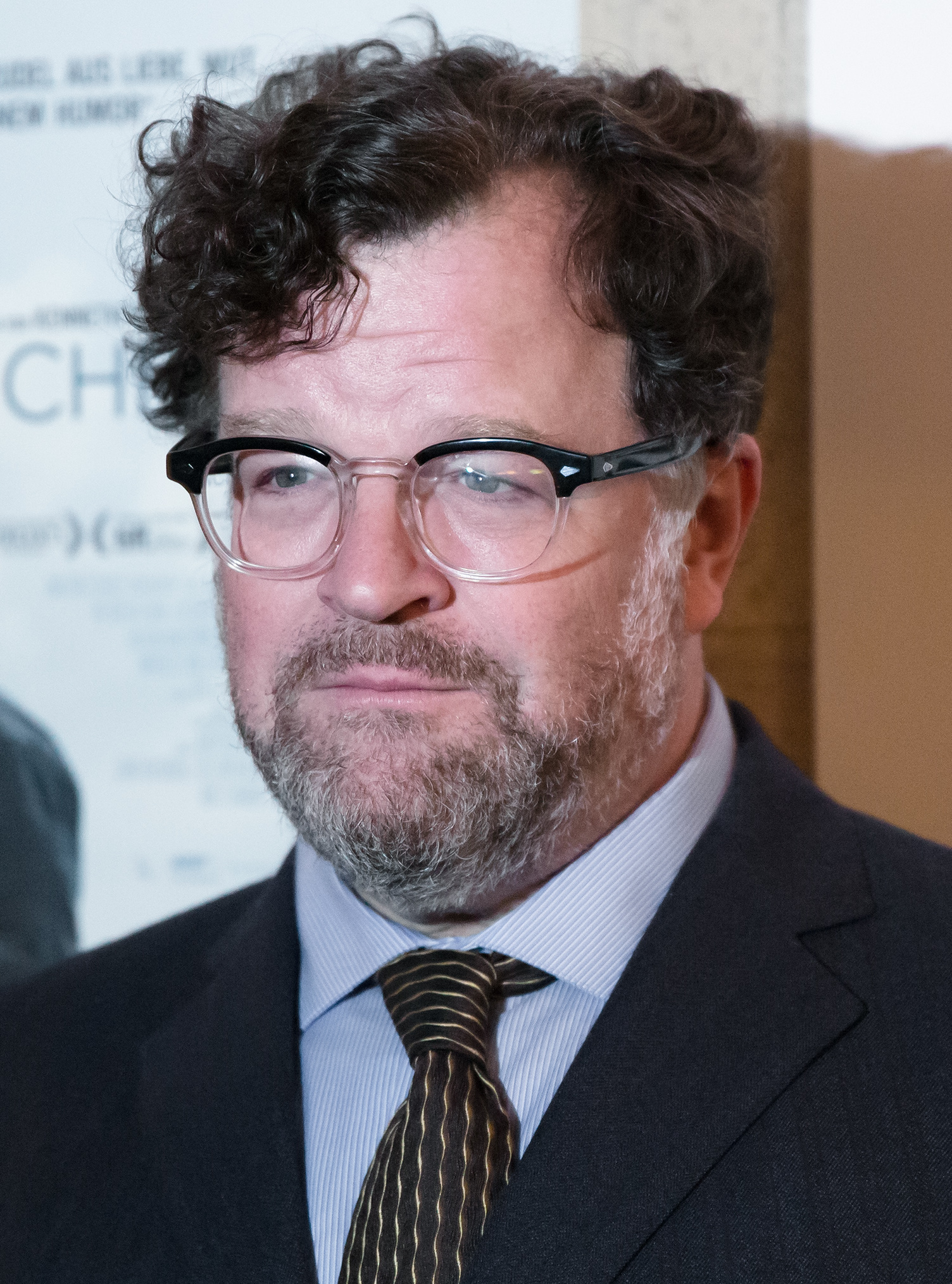
Kenneth Lonergan, Best Screenplay winner

- Best Picture:
  - Crouching Tiger, Hidden Dragon (Wo hu cang long)
  - Runner-up: Wonder Boys
- Best Director:
  - Steven Soderbergh – Erin Brockovich and Traffic
  - Runner-up: Ang Lee – Crouching Tiger, Hidden Dragon (Wo hu cang long)
- Best Actor:
  - Michael Douglas – Wonder Boys
  - Runner-up: Javier Bardem – Before Night Falls
- Best Actress:
  - Julia Roberts – Erin Brockovich
  - Runner-up: Laura Linney – You Can Count on Me
- Best Supporting Actor:
  - Willem Dafoe – Shadow of the Vampire
  - Runner-up: Benicio del Toro – Traffic
- Best Supporting Actress:
  - Frances McDormand – Almost Famous and Wonder Boys
  - Runner-up: Zhang Ziyi – Crouching Tiger, Hidden Dragon (Wo hu cang long)
- Best Screenplay:
  - Kenneth Lonergan – You Can Count on Me
  - Runner-up: Steve Kloves – Wonder Boys
- Best Cinematography:
  - Peter Pau – Crouching Tiger, Hidden Dragon (Wo hu cang long)
  - Runner-up: Steven Soderbergh – Traffic
- Best Production Design:
  - Tim Yip – Crouching Tiger, Hidden Dragon (Wo hu cang long)
  - Runner-up: Don Taylor – The House of Mirth
- Best Music Score:
  - Tan Dun – Crouching Tiger, Hidden Dragon (Wo hu cang long)
  - Runner-up: Björk – Dancer in the Dark
- Best Foreign-Language Film:
  - Yi Yi • Taiwan/Japan
  - Runner-up: Girl on the Bridge (La fille sur le pont) • France
- Best Non-Fiction Film:
  - Dark Days
  - Runner-up: The Life and Times of Hank Greenberg
- Best Animation:
  - Chicken Run
- New Generation Award:
  - Mark Ruffalo – You Can Count on Me
- Career Achievement Award:
  - Conrad L. Hall
- Special Citation:
  - Charles Champlin
