= Before Night Falls (film) =

- Theatrical release poster
- Directed by: Julian Schnabel
- Screenplay by: Lázaro Gómez Carriles; Cunningham O'Keefe; Julian Schnabel
- Based on: Before Night Falls book by Reinaldo Arenas; Havana film by Jana Boková
- Produced by: Jon Kilik
- Starring: Javier Bardem; Olivier Martinez; Johnny Depp; Héctor Babenco
- Cinematography: Xavier Pérez Grobet; Guillermo Rosas
- Edited by: Michael Berenbaum
- Music by: Carter Burwell
- Production company: Grandview Pictures
- Distributed by: Fine Line Features
- Release dates: September 3, 2000 (Venice); December 22, 2000 (United States)
- Running time: 133 minutes
- Country: United States
- Language: English
- Budget: $20 million
- Box office: $8.5 million

Before Night Falls is a 2000 American biographical drama film directed by Julian Schnabel. The film is based on both the autobiography of the same name by Reinaldo Arenas—published in English in 1993—as well as Jana Boková's 1990 documentary Havana.

The screenplay was co-written by Schnabel, Lázaro Gómez Carriles and Cunningham O'Keefe. The film stars Javier Bardem (in his international film debut), Johnny Depp, Olivier Martinez, Andrea Di Stefano, Santiago Magill, John Ortiz, Héctor Babenco, Sean Penn, and Michael Wincott. The film had its world premiere at the 57th Venice International Film Festival. At the 73rd Academy Awards, Bardem was nominated for Best Actor, becoming the first Spanish performer to do so.

== Plot ==
In the film, Arenas is born in Oriente Province, Cuba in 1943 and raised by his single mother and her parents, who soon move the entire family to Holguín. After moving to Havana in the 1960s to continue his studies, Reinaldo begins to explore his ambitions, as well as his sexuality. After receiving an honorary mention in a writing contest, Arenas is offered the chance to publish his first work. Through his work and friendships with other openly gay men, like Pepe Malas and Tomas Diego, Arenas manages to find himself.

The political climate in Cuba becomes increasingly dangerous, and in the early 1970s Arenas is arrested for allegedly sexually assaulting minors, and for publishing abroad without official consent. He is imprisoned in El Morro Castle where he endures abuse and violence from guards. In the next decade, he is in and out of prison, attempting and failing to leave the country several times.

In 1980, Arenas finally leaves Cuba for the United States during the Mariel Boatlift, starting a new life with his close friend Lazaro Gomez Carriles. A few years later, Arenas is diagnosed with AIDS. In one scene where he is sick in the hospital, a nurse tells Arenas he is going home, to which he delirously replies, "to Cuba?" After spending several years suffering he dies in 1990. At the end of the film, a Spanish and English version of Arenas' poem "Yo soy" is used.

== Historical Context ==
Set within the rise of the Cuban Revolution, the film portrays the subjugation of queer individuals as a means of “correcting” anti-revolutionary behavior. Homosexuality had been formally criminalized in Cuba in the Social Defense Code of 1938, article 490, threatening up to six months in prison. Inspired by Stalinist principles criminalizing homosexuals, the Popular Socialist Party set forth policies further targeting Cuban homosexuals, including expulsion from schools and targeting artists and intellectuals such as Arenas. Beginning in 1965, gay men and transgender women were included among other detainees deemed “anti-social” for not conforming to revolutionary ideals and were placed in re-education labor camps known as Unidades Militares de Ayuda a la Produccion (UMAP) or Military Units to Aid Production. Men who displayed effeminate behavior were also targeted by the regime for not fitting the hypermasculine standards under the machismo culture of Cuba. Tangible changes in the legal status of homosexuality were not seen until 1979, where the new Penal Code removed the previously imposed article 490.

== Cast ==
- Javier Bardem as Reinaldo Arenas
- Olivier Martinez as Lázaro Gómez Carriles
- Johnny Depp as Bon Bon / Lt. Víctor
- Héctor Babenco as Virgilio Piñera
- Andrea Di Stefano as Pepe Malas
- Santiago Magill as Tomás Diego
- John Ortiz as Juan Abreu
- Manuel González as José Lezama Lima
- Francisco Gattorno as Jorge Camacho
- Marisol Padilla Sánchez as Margarita Camacho
- Michael Wincott as Herberto Zorilla Ochoa
- Pedro Armendáriz Jr. as Reinaldo's Grandfather
- Sean Penn as Cuco Sanchez
- Najwa Nimri as Fina Zorilla Ochoa
- Diego Luna as Carlos
- Maurice Compte as Nicolas Abreu
- Diahnne Abbott as Blanca Romero
- Jerzy Skolimowski as Professor
- Cy and Olmo Schnabel as Reinaldo's classmates
- Vito Schnabel as Teenage Reinaldo
- Lola Schnabel as Girl with keys
- Stella Schnabel as Valeria
- Jack and Esther G. Schnabel as Mr. and Mrs. Greenberg
- Olatz López Garmendia as Mrs. Arenas

== Production ==
Julian Schnabel got the idea of making Before Night Falls immediately after making Basquiat; however, it took four years to actually produce the film.

Bardem spent one-and-a-half months in New York City with Arenas's best friend, Lazaro Gomez Carriles, taking two hours a day to study how Arenas walked and talked.

== Reception and accolades ==
=== Critical response ===
On review aggregator website Rotten Tomatoes, the film has a 74% approval rating and an 83% popcornmeter rating based on 100 reviews and an average rating of 6.8/10. The site's consensus states: "An impressionistic, fragmented look at Reinaldo Arenas, Before Night Falls' imagery manages to evoke a sense of the writer's artistry, and Bardem's strong performance holds the film together. Finally, a biopic done well." Metacritic reports an 85 out of 100 rating based on 26 critics, indicating "universal acclaim".

Roger Ebert gave the film three and a half stars out of four, stating, "One is reminded a little of the Marquis de Sade, as portrayed in Quills. It was never simply what they wrote, but that, standing outside convention, taunting the authorities, inhabiting impossible lives, they wrote at all." Peter Travers from Rolling Stone awarded the film a full five out of five stars, writing, "In uniting to honor Arenas, Bardem and Schnabel create something extraordinary."

=== Box office ===
The film opened in eight venues on December 22, 2000, and earned $85,230 in its first weekend, ranking #34 in the North American box office. The film received a wide release on February 23, 2001.

Before Night Falls grossed $4.2 million in the US and $4.3 million overseas for a worldwide total of $8.5 million from an estimated $20 million budget.

=== Awards and nominations ===
At the 73rd Academy Awards (2001), Javier Bardem became the first Spanish actor to be nominated for Best Actor in a Leading Role.

Award	Category	Nominee(s)	Result
Academy Awards	Best Actor	Javier Bardem	Nominated
ALMA Awards	Outstanding Feature Film		Nominated
ALMA Awards	Outstanding Latino Cast in a Feature Film		Nominated
ALMA Awards	Outstanding Soundtrack or Compilation for Television and Film		Nominated
American Film Institute Awards	Top 10 Movies of the Year		Won
Awards Circuit Community Awards	Best Actor in a Leading Role	Javier Bardem	Nominated
Boston Society of Film Critics Awards	Best Actor	Javier Bardem	2nd Place
Chicago Film Critics Association Awards	Best Actor	Javier Bardem	Nominated
Chlotrudis Awards	Best Actor	Javier Bardem	Nominated
GLAAD Media Awards	Outstanding Film – Limited Release		Nominated
Golden Globe Awards	Best Actor in a Motion Picture – Drama	Javier Bardem	Nominated
Independent Spirit Awards	Best Feature		Nominated
Independent Spirit Awards	Best Director	Julian Schnabel	Nominated
Independent Spirit Awards	Best Male Lead	Javier Bardem	Won
Independent Spirit Awards	Best Cinematography	Xavier Pérez Grobet and Guillermo Rosas	Nominated
Latin ACE Awards	Cinema – Best Actor	Javier Bardem	Won
Los Angeles Film Critics Association Awards	Best Actor	Javier Bardem	Runner-up
National Board of Review Awards	Top 10 Films		6th Place
National Board of Review Awards	Best Actor	Javier Bardem	Won
National Board of Review Awards	Freedom of Expression		Won
National Society of Film Critics Awards	Best Actor	Javier Bardem	Won
New York Film Critics Circle Awards	Best Actor	Javier Bardem	Runner-up
Online Film & Television Association Awards	Best Actor	Javier Bardem	Nominated
Phoenix Film Critics Society Awards	Best Actor in a Leading Role	Javier Bardem	Nominated
Political Film Society Awards	Exposé		Won
Political Film Society Awards	Human Rights		Nominated
Russian Guild of Film Critics Awards	Best Foreign Actor	Javier Bardem	Nominated
SESC Film Festival	Best Foreign Actor (Audience Award)	Javier Bardem	Won
SESC Film Festival	Best Foreign Actor (Critics Award)	Javier Bardem	Won
Southeastern Film Critics Association Awards	Best Actor	Javier Bardem	Won (Note: Tied with Michael Douglas for Wonder Boys.)
Venice International Film Festival	Golden Lion	Julian Schnabel	Nominated
Venice International Film Festival	Grand Jury Prize	Julian Schnabel	Won
Venice International Film Festival	OCIC Award – Honorable Mention	Julian Schnabel	Won
Venice International Film Festival	Volpi Cup for Best Actor	Javier Bardem	Won
Venice International Film Festival	Rota Soundtrack Award	Carter Burwell	Won
World Soundtrack Awards	Soundtrack Composer of the Year	Carter Burwell	Nominated
World Soundtrack Awards	Best Original Score of the Year	Carter Burwell	Nominated

== Soundtrack ==
1. El Que Siembra Su Maíz - Trio Matamoros
2. Tu Veras - Trio Matamoros
3. El Tumbaito - Guayabero
4. Ay Mariposa - Pedro Luis Ferrer
5. El Trio y El Ciclon - Trio Matamoros
6. Aguirre, Der Zorn Gottes (Lacrime Di Re) - Popol Vuh
7. Baton Rouge - Lou Reed
8. Loop Vamp - Laurie Anderson
9. Los Tamalitos De Olga - Orquesta Aragón
10. Descarga Sonora - Sonora Matancera
11. Crisantemo - Ernesto Lecuona
12. Por Que Me La Dejaste Querer? - Bola de Nieve
13. Duerme - Bebo Valdés
14. Surrounding The Casbah - Ennio Morricone (from "The Battle of Algiers" (1966))
15. Conoci La Paz - Benny Moré
16. Kamata Mariyam - Fairuz
17. El Canonero - Benny Moré
18. En El Olvido - Jose Espinosa
19. Adagietto, Sehr Langsam - Berliner Philharmoniker (from Mahler's Symphony No. 5)
20. Fefita - José Urfé
21. Mujer Perjura - Antonio Escobar
