= Chicken Run =

2000 animated comedy film

- British theatrical release poster
- Directed by: Peter Lord; Nick Park
- Screenplay by: Karey Kirkpatrick
- Story by: Peter Lord; Nick Park
- Produced by: Peter Lord; David Sproxton; Nick Park
- Starring: Phil Daniels; Lynn Ferguson; Mel Gibson; Tony Haygarth; Jane Horrocks; Miranda Richardson; Julia Sawalha; Timothy Spall; Imelda Staunton; Benjamin Whitrow
- Cinematography: Dave Alex Riddett; Tristan Oliver; Frank Passingham
- Edited by: Mark Solomon
- Music by: John Powell; Harry Gregson-Williams
- Production companies: DreamWorks Animation; Aardman Features
- Distributed by: DreamWorks Pictures (through DreamWorks Distribution; worldwide) (Note: In July 2014, the film's distribution rights were purchased by DreamWorks Animation from Paramount Pictures (owners of the pre-2005 DreamWorks Pictures catalog) and transferred to 20th Century Fox before reverting to Universal Pictures in 2018 following NBCUniversal's acquisition of DreamWorks Animation in 2016.); Pathé Distribution and StudioCanal (select European territories)
- Release dates: 23 June 2000 (United States); 30 June 2000 (United Kingdom)
- Running time: 84 minutes
- Countries: United Kingdom; United States; France
- Language: English
- Budget: $42–45 million
- Box office: $228 million

Chicken Run is a 2000 stop motion animated adventure comedy film directed by Peter Lord and Nick Park and written by Karey Kirkpatrick from an original story by Lord and Park. Produced by Aardman Features in partnership with Pathé and DreamWorks Animation, it is Aardman's first feature-length film. The film stars the voices of Julia Sawalha, Mel Gibson, Tony Haygarth, Miranda Richardson, Phil Daniels, Lynn Ferguson, Timothy Spall, Imelda Staunton, and Benjamin Whitrow. Set in the countryside of Yorkshire, the film centres on a group of British anthropomorphic chickens in an oppressive egg farm who see an American rooster named Rocky Rhodes as their only hope for escape.

Lord and Park conceived of Chicken Run in 1995, inspired by prison escape films like 1963's The Great Escape. Pathé agreed to finance the film in 1996 and DreamWorks officially came on board in 1997, beating out other interested Hollywood studios and securing distribution in most countries. DreamWorks co-chairman Jeffrey Katzenberg had been interested in working with Aardman ever since seeing their 1989 short film, Creature Comforts. Principal photography began in January 1998 and wrapped in June 1999. During production, 30 sets were used with 80 animators working to film a minute of footage a week.

Chicken Run was released in the United States on 23 June 2000 and in the United Kingdom on 30 June 2000. It was a critical and commercial success, grossing $228 million and becoming the highest-grossing stop-motion animated film in history. At the time, this film was DreamWorks Animation's most successful release, but this was overtaken by Shrek the following year. A sequel, titled Chicken Run: Dawn of the Nugget, was released on Netflix on 15 December 2023.

== Plot ==
In the countryside of Yorkshire, a flock of chickens live on an egg farm structured like a prisoner-of-war camp. The farm is run by the cruel Mrs Tweedy and her submissive husband, Mr Tweedy, who kill and eat any chicken that is no longer able to lay eggs. Led by the rebellious Ginger, the chickens constantly devise new ways to try to escape but are always caught. Mr Tweedy suspects the chickens are organised and plotting resistance, but his wife dismisses his theories while being frustrated with making minuscule profits.

One night, Ginger sees an American rooster named Rocky Rhodes glide over the farm's fences and crash-land; the chickens put his sprained wing in a cast and hide him from the Tweedys, who have been promised a handsome reward by Rocky's owner for his return. Inspired by Rocky's apparent flying abilities, Ginger begs him to help teach her and the other chickens to fly so they can escape, threatening to turn him in if he refuses. Rocky reluctantly gives them training lessons. One evening, a load of equipment is delivered to the farm, containing the parts for a chicken pie machine that Mrs Tweedy has ordered as part of a plan to convert the farm into a profitable pie-making factory. When the Tweedys increase the chickens' food rations and ignore the decline in egg production, Ginger deduces that the couple's new plan is to fatten the chickens for slaughter. The chickens become despondent, but Rocky holds a morale-boosting dance party during which it is revealed that his wing is healed. Ginger talks Rocky into agreeing to give a flying demonstration the next day. Mr Tweedy finishes assembling the machine and puts Ginger in it for a test run. Rocky saves her and sabotages the machine, buying them time to warn the chickens and plan an escape from the farm.

The next day, Ginger finds Rocky has escaped overnight, leaving behind part of a poster that shows he is part of a "chicken cannonball" act with no ability to fly on his own, and that their chance to learn how to fly has been crushed. While devastated, Ginger is inspired by elderly rooster Fowler's stories of his time as a mascot in the Royal Air Force to build an aircraft to flee the farm. The chickens assemble parts for the plane as Mr Tweedy fixes the pie-making machine. Meanwhile, Rocky comes across a billboard advertising Mrs Tweedy's chicken pies and returns to the farm out of guilt.

Mrs Tweedy orders Mr Tweedy to gather all the chickens for the machine, but the chickens subdue him and finish the plane, which Ginger persuades Fowler to pilot. As the plane approaches the take-off ramp, Mr Tweedy escapes and manages to knock over the ramp before being knocked out; Ginger races to reset the ramp, but a now-alerted Mrs Tweedy attacks her. Rocky returns and subdues Mrs Tweedy, before helping Ginger re-raise the ramp, allowing the plane to take flight. Rocky and Ginger grab onto the runway lights, which have been snagged by the departing plane. An axe-wielding Mrs Tweedy follows them by climbing up the lights, but Ginger tricks Mrs Tweedy into cutting the line, sending her falling into the pie machine, blocking the safety valve and causing the machine to explode in a mushroom cloud of gravy.

The chickens celebrate their victory while Ginger and Rocky kiss, and they fly to an island bird sanctuary. Sometime later, the chickens have settled into their new home, and Rocky and Ginger have continued their romantic relationship.

== Voice cast ==
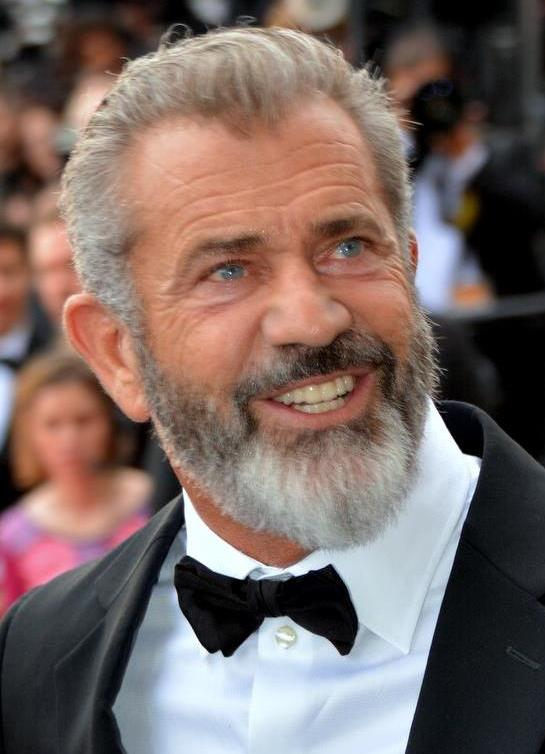
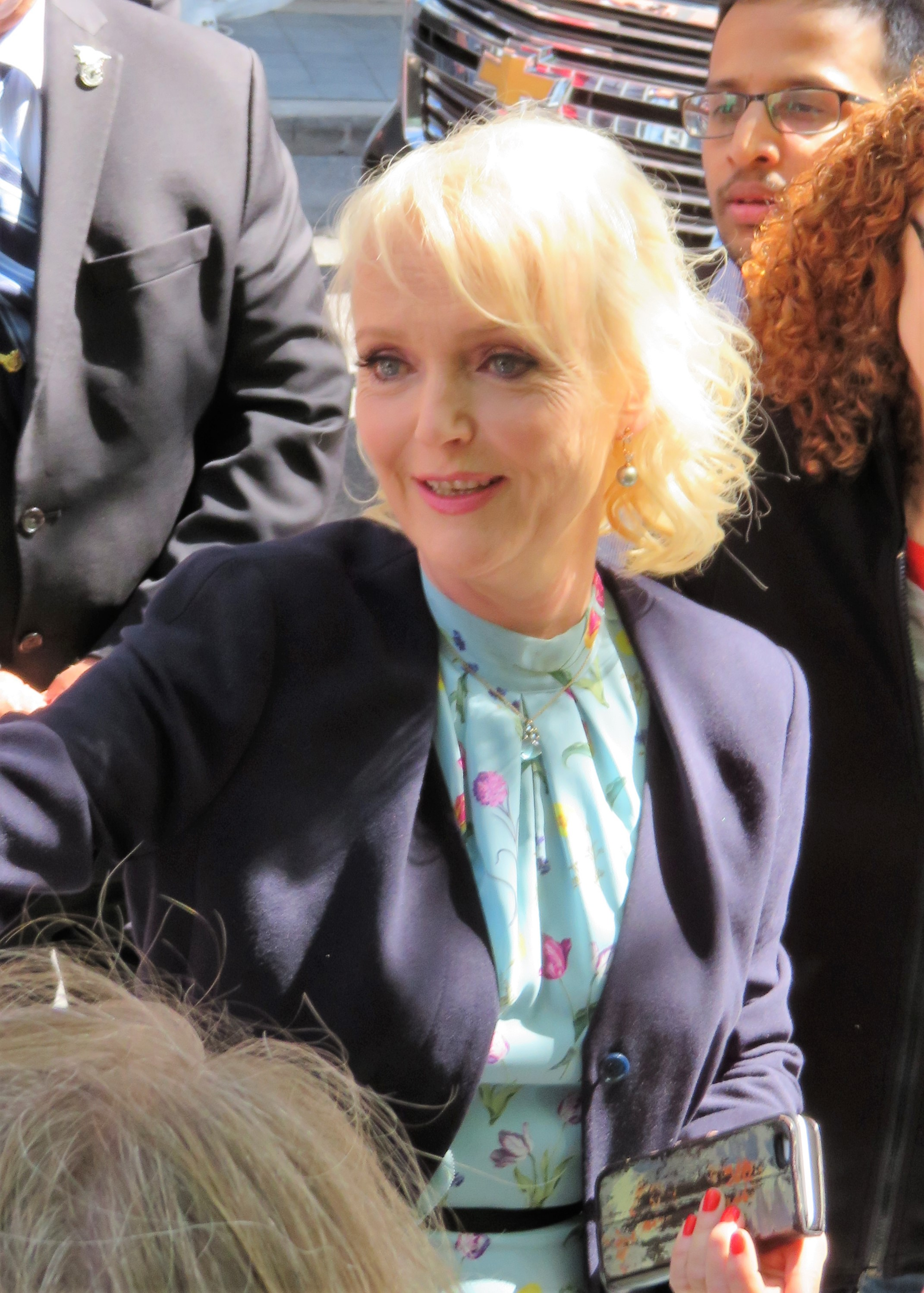
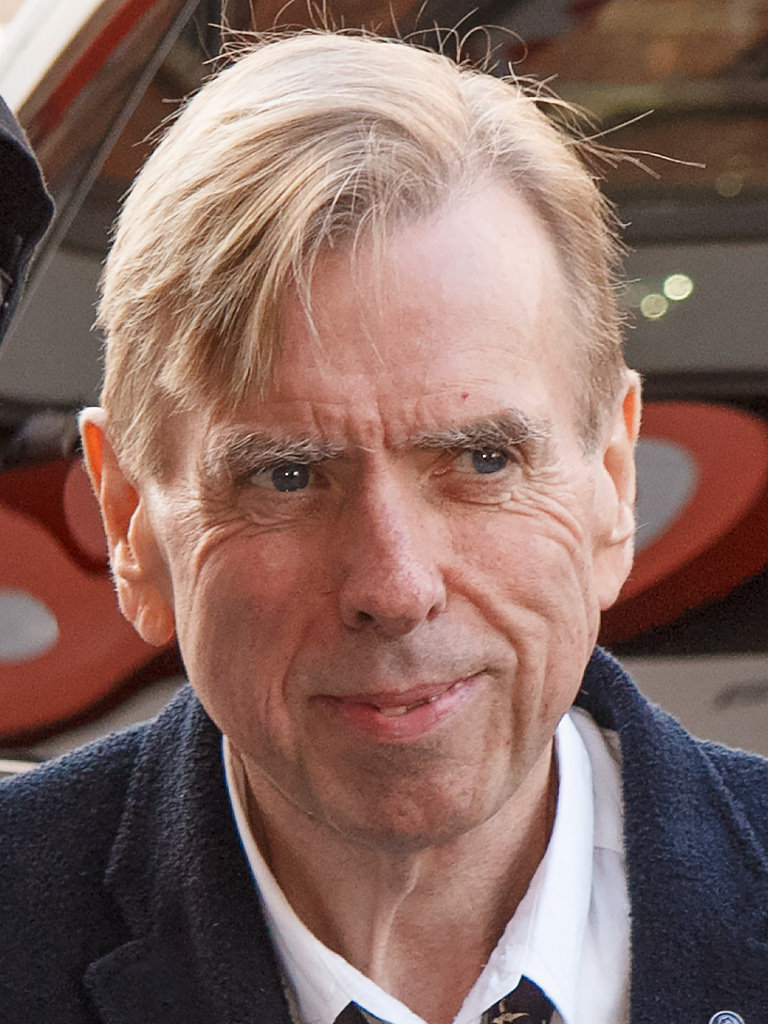
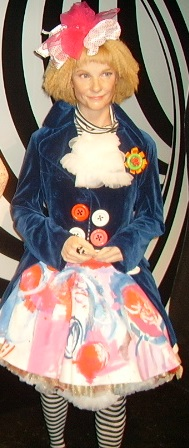
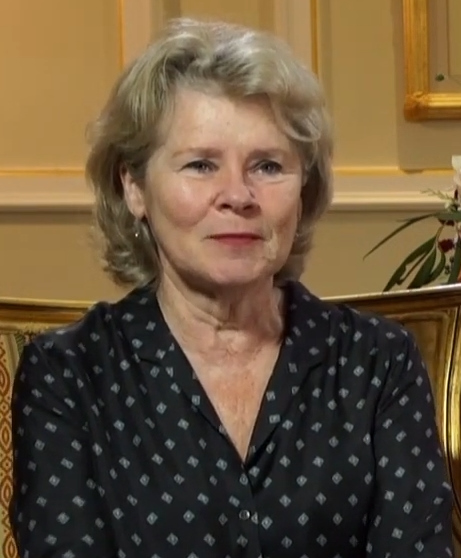
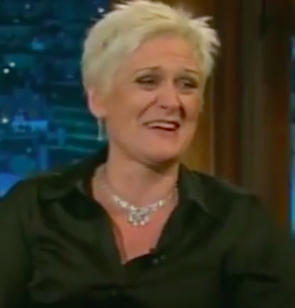
Top row: Mel Gibson, Miranda Richardson, Timothy Spall, Jane Horrocks respectively play the roles of Rocky, Mrs Tweedy, Nick, and Babs.
Bottom row: Imelda Staunton and Lynn Ferguson respectively play the roles of Bunty and Mac.
- Julia Sawalha as Ginger, the de facto leader of the chickens
- Mel Gibson as Rocky, an American circus rooster and Ginger's love interest
- Miranda Richardson as Mrs Tweedy, the owner of the farm
- Tony Haygarth as Mr Tweedy, Mrs Tweedy's henpecked husband and the co-owner of the farm
- Benjamin Whitrow as Fowler, an elderly rooster
- Timothy Spall as Nick, a cynical, conniving rat
- Phil Daniels as Fetcher, Nick's dim-witted partner
- Jane Horrocks as Babs, a chubby chicken who loves knitting
- Imelda Staunton as Bunty, a straightforward hen and champion egg-layer
- Lynn Ferguson as Mac, Ginger's Scottish second in command

== Production ==
=== Development ===
Chicken Run was first conceived in 1995 by Aardman co-founder Peter Lord and Wallace and Gromit creator Nick Park. According to Park, the project started as a spoof on the 1963 film The Great Escape. Chicken Run was Aardman Animations' first feature-length production, which would be executive produced by Jake Eberts. Nick Park and Peter Lord, who run Aardman, directed the film, while Karey Kirkpatrick scripted, with additional input from Mark Burton and John O'Farrell.

When a chicken speaks, each sound corresponds to a different beak that was placed on the character.

Pathé agreed to finance the film in 1996, putting their finances into script development and model design. DreamWorks officially came on board in 1997. They beat out studios including Disney, 20th Century Fox (which had distributed many of Aardman's earlier projects, including the Wallace & Gromit shorts, in the U.S.), and Warner Bros. (which had also distributed some of Aardman's earlier projects in the U.S.) and largely won due to the perseverance of DreamWorks co-chairman Jeffrey Katzenberg; as a company they were eager to make their presence felt in the animation market in an attempt to compete with Disney's dominance of the field. Katzenberg explained that he had "been chasing these guys for five or six years, ever since I first saw Creature Comforts." DreamWorks secured their first animated feature with the film, and they handled distribution in all territories except Europe, which Pathé handled. The two studios co-financed the film. DreamWorks also retains rights to worldwide merchandising.

=== Animation ===
Principal photography began on 29 January 1998. During production, 30 sets were used with 80 animators working along with 180 people working overall. The result was one minute of film completed for each week of filming, and production wrapped on 18 June 1999.

=== Music ===
John Powell and Harry Gregson-Williams composed the music for the film, which was released on 20 June 2000 under the RCA Victor label. It was recorded at the Abbey Road Studios in London. Powell incorporated some kazoos and whistles to create an even funnier soundtrack.

== Reception ==
=== Critical response ===
The review aggregator website Rotten Tomatoes reported a 97% approval rating and an average rating of 8.5/10, based on 169 reviews. The website's critics consensus reads: "Chicken Run has all the charm of Nick Park's Wallace & Gromit, and something for everybody. The voice acting is fabulous, the slapstick is brilliant, and the action sequences are spectacular." At Metacritic the film has a weighted average score of 88 out of 100, based on 34 critics, indicating "universal acclaim". Audiences polled by CinemaScore gave the film an average grade of "A−" on an A+ to F scale.

Roger Ebert of the Chicago Sun-Times gave three and a half stars out of four, writing: "So it truly is a matter of life and death for the chickens to escape from the Tweedy Chicken Farm in Chicken Run, a magical new animated film that looks and sounds like no other. Like the otherwise completely different Babe, this is a movie that uses animals as surrogates for our hopes and fears, and as the chickens run through one failed escape attempt after another, the charm of the movie wins us over."

Chicken Run and its sequel have been noted for their depiction of feminism, revolution, Marxism, veganism and fascism. According to Florentine StrzeIczyk, Chicken Run points to the way that masculinity and femininity are mediated in popular film genres. It also received attention for its female-led cast. Film School Rejects called the movie feminist, noting that "the stereotypical 'woman's work' of these female chickens (such as their sewing and knitting) is crucial in constructing their mechanism for escape and vital towards the revolution itself."

=== Box office ===
On opening weekend, the film grossed $17,506,162 for a $7,027 average from 2,491 theatres. Overall, the film placed second behind Me, Myself & Irene. In its second weekend, the film held well as it slipped only 25% to $13,192,897 for a $4,627 average from expanding to 2,851 theatres and finishing in fourth place. The film's widest release was 2,953 theatres, after grossing $106,834,564 in the United States and Canada. In the United Kingdom, it was the third highest-grossing film of the year behind Toy Story 2 and Gladiator with a gross of $43 million. At the time, this film was DreamWorks Animation's most successful release, but this was overtaken by Shrek the following year. With an additional $75 million from other markets, it grossed $224,834,564 worldwide. Produced on an estimated budget of $42–45 million, the film was a huge box office hit. To date, it is still the highest-grossing stop motion animated movie.

=== Accolades ===
Group	Category (Recipient)	Result
Annie Awards	Outstanding Achievement in an Animated Theatrical Feature	Nominated
Annie Awards	Outstanding Individual Achievement for Directing in an Animated Feature Production (Nick Park and Peter Lord)	Nominated
Annie Awards	Outstanding Individual Achievement for Writing in an Animated Feature Production (Karey Kirkpatrick)	Nominated
British Academy Film Awards	Best British Film	Nominated
British Academy Film Awards	Best Visual Effects	Nominated
British Academy Children's Awards	Feature Film	Nominated
Broadcast Film Critics	Best Animated Feature	Won
Dallas-Fort Worth Film Critics	Best Animated Feature	Won
Empire Awards	Best British Director (Nick Park and Peter Lord)	Nominated
Empire Awards	Best British Film	Nominated
Empire Awards	Best Debut (Nick Park and Peter Lord)	Nominated
European Film Awards	Best Film	Nominated
Florida Film Critics	Best Animated Feature	Won
Genesis Awards	Best Feature Film	Won
Golden Globe Awards	Best Motion Picture – Musical or Comedy	Nominated
Kansas City Film Critics	Best Animated Feature	Won
Nickelodeon Kids’ Choice Awards	Favorite Voice From an Animated Movie (Mel Gibson)	Nominated
Las Vegas Film Critics	Best Family Film	Won
Los Angeles Film Critics	Best Animated Feature	Won
National Board of Review	Best Animated Feature	Won
New York Film Critics	Best Animated Feature	Won
Phoenix Film Critics	Best Animated Feature	Won
Phoenix Film Critics	Best Family Film	Won
Phoenix Film Critics	Best Original Score (John Powell and Harry Gregson-Williams)	Nominated
Satellite Awards	Best Motion Picture—Animated or Mixed Media	Won
Satellite Awards	Best Sound	Nominated
Southeastern Film Critics	Best Film	Nominated

== Home media ==
Chicken Run was released on VHS and DVD in the United States on 21 November 2000 by DreamWorks Home Entertainment.

Universal Pictures Home Entertainment released Chicken Run on Blu-ray in North America on 22 January 2019.

== Sequel ==
In January 2022, the title for the sequel was revealed as Chicken Run: Dawn of the Nugget and was announced for a 2023 release on Netflix. Zachary Levi, Thandiwe Newton, Romesh Ranganathan and Daniel Mays were revealed to be replacing Gibson, Sawalha, Spall and Daniels as the voices of Rocky, Ginger, Nick and Fetcher; David Bradley voiced Fowler due to Whitrow's death in 2017, while Horrocks, Staunton and Ferguson reprised their roles as Babs, Bunty and Mac. Bella Ramsey was cast as Molly, while Nick Mohammed and Josie Sedgwick-Davies voiced two new characters, Dr Fry and Frizzle, respectively. Sam Fell directed with Steve Pegram and Leyla Hobart producing. Kirkpatrick and O'Farrell wrote the script with Rachel Tunnard. In June 2023, Gregson-Williams was revealed to be composing the sequel. Later that month, it was officially announced that the film would release on Netflix on 15 December 2023. Its Netflix release followed its world premiere at the 67th BFI London Film Festival on 14 October 2023, which would also see preview screenings taking place at UK cinemas at the same time.

== Video game ==
Chicken Run is a stealth-based 3-D platformer based on the movie. It was released in November 2000 on most consoles. The game is a loose parody of the film The Great Escape, which is set during World War II.

== See also ==
- Lists of animated feature films
- List of stop motion films
- Colditz Cock, a glider built by British prisoners of war for an escape attempt during World War II
