= 2000 National Society of Film Critics Awards =

Annual US film awards ceremony

35th NSFC Awards

January 6, 2001

Best Film:
Yi Yi

The 35th National Society of Film Critics Awards, given on 6 January 2001, honored the best in film for 2000.

== Winners ==
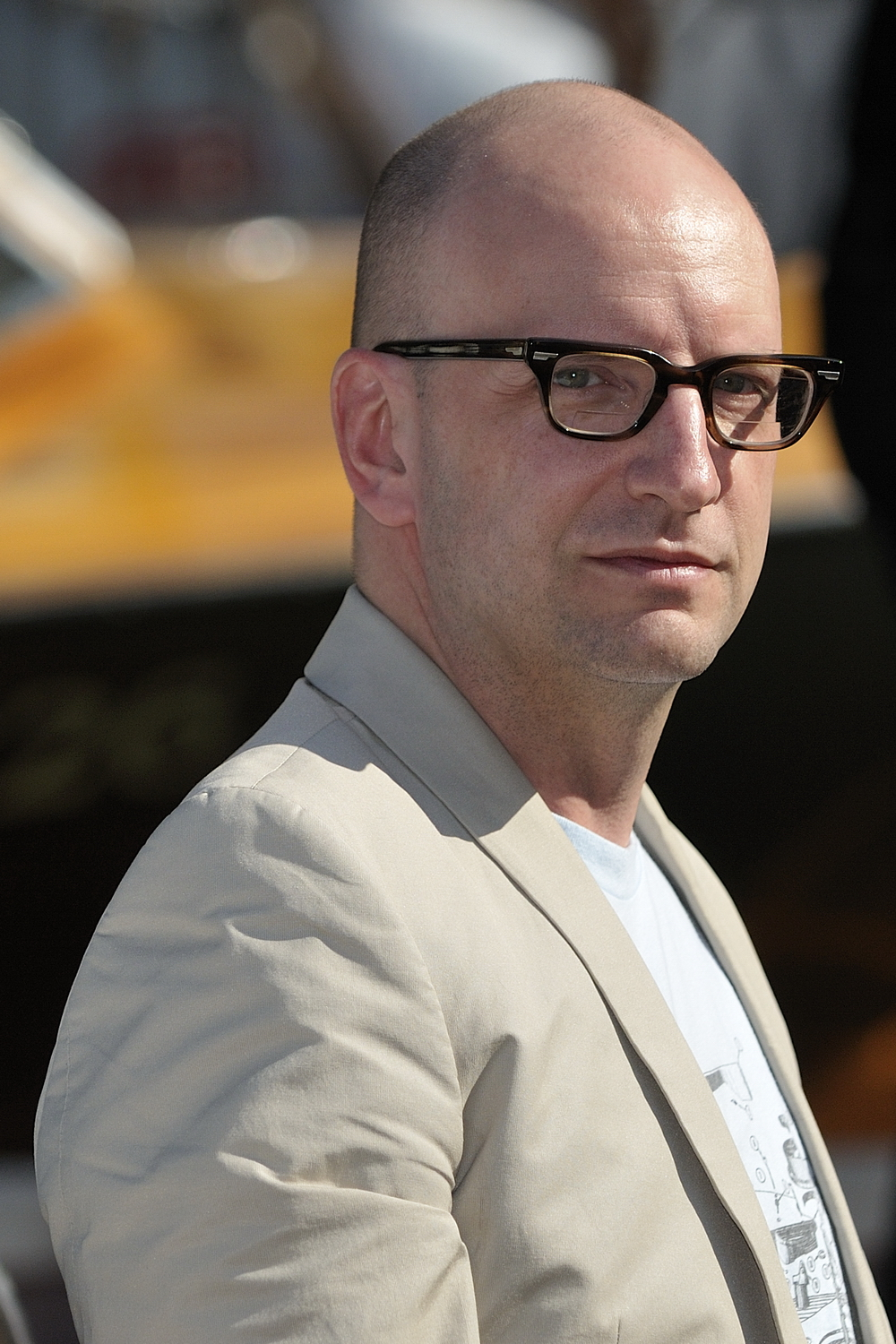
Steven Soderbergh, Best Director winner

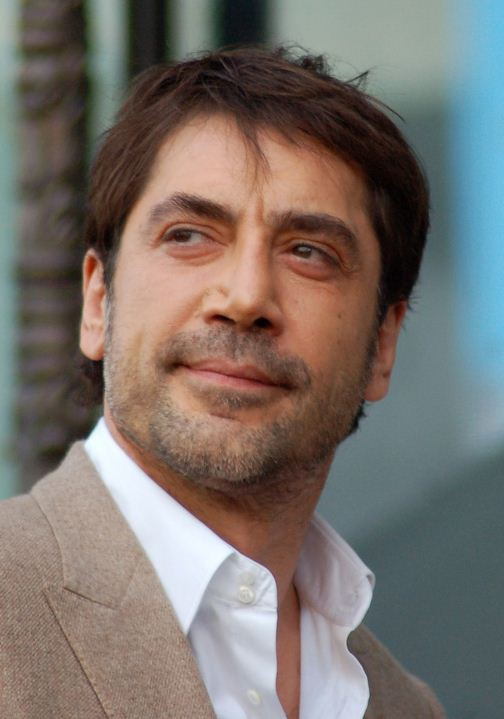
Javier Bardem, Best Actor winner

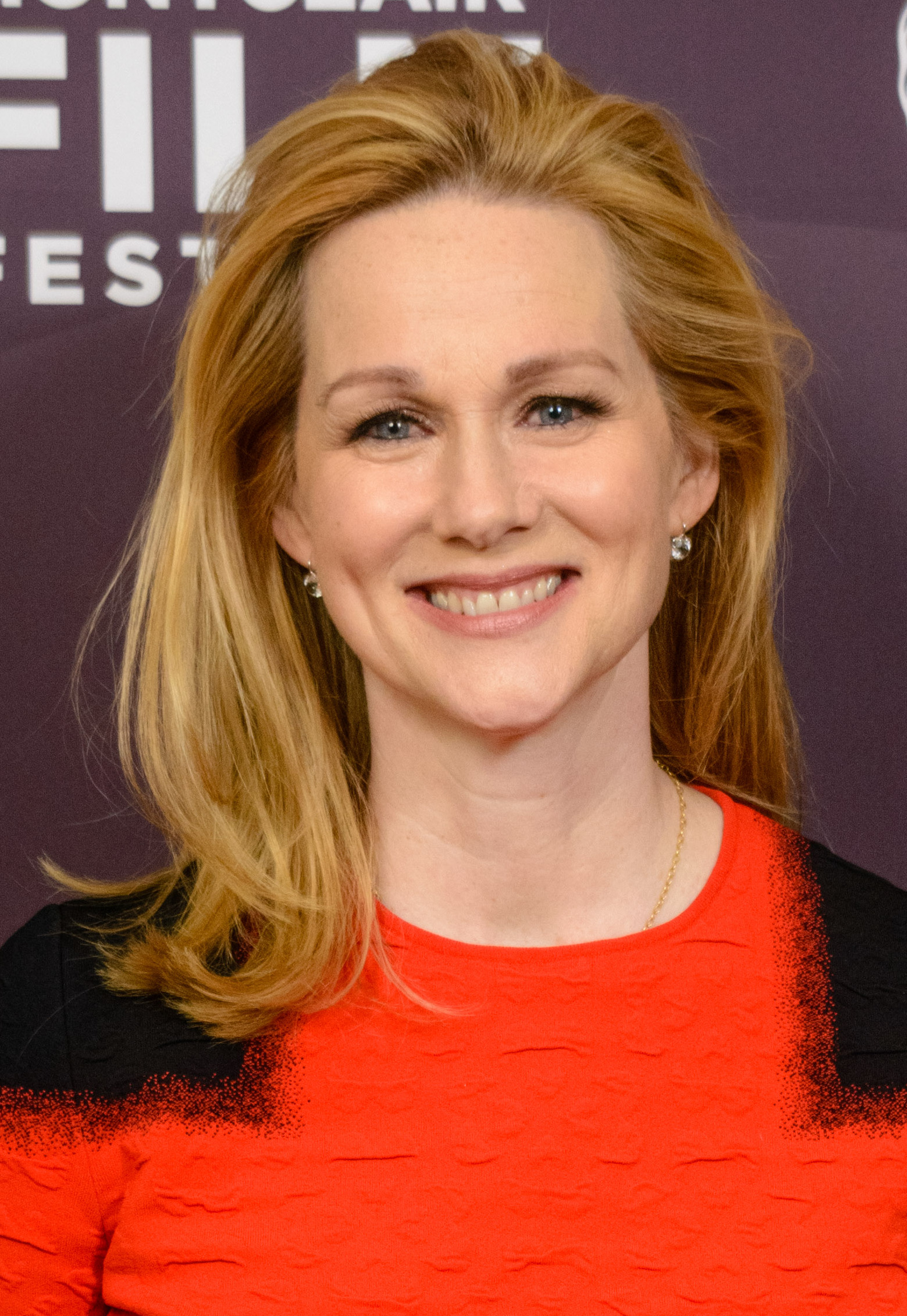
Laura Linney, Best Actress winner

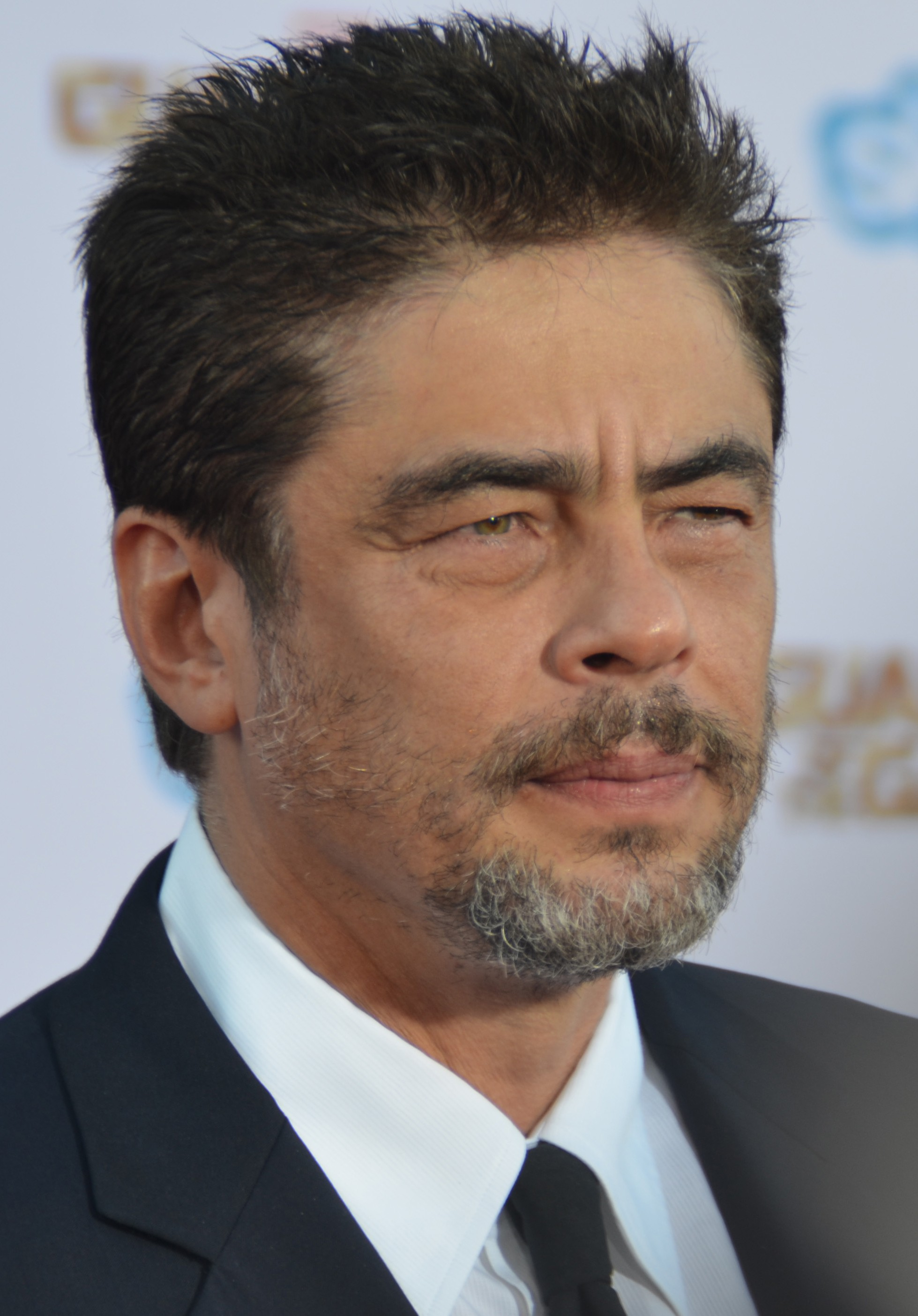
Benicio del Toro, Best Supporting Actor winner

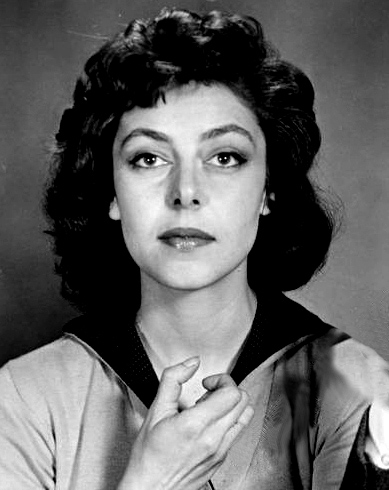
Elaine May, Best Supporting Actress winner

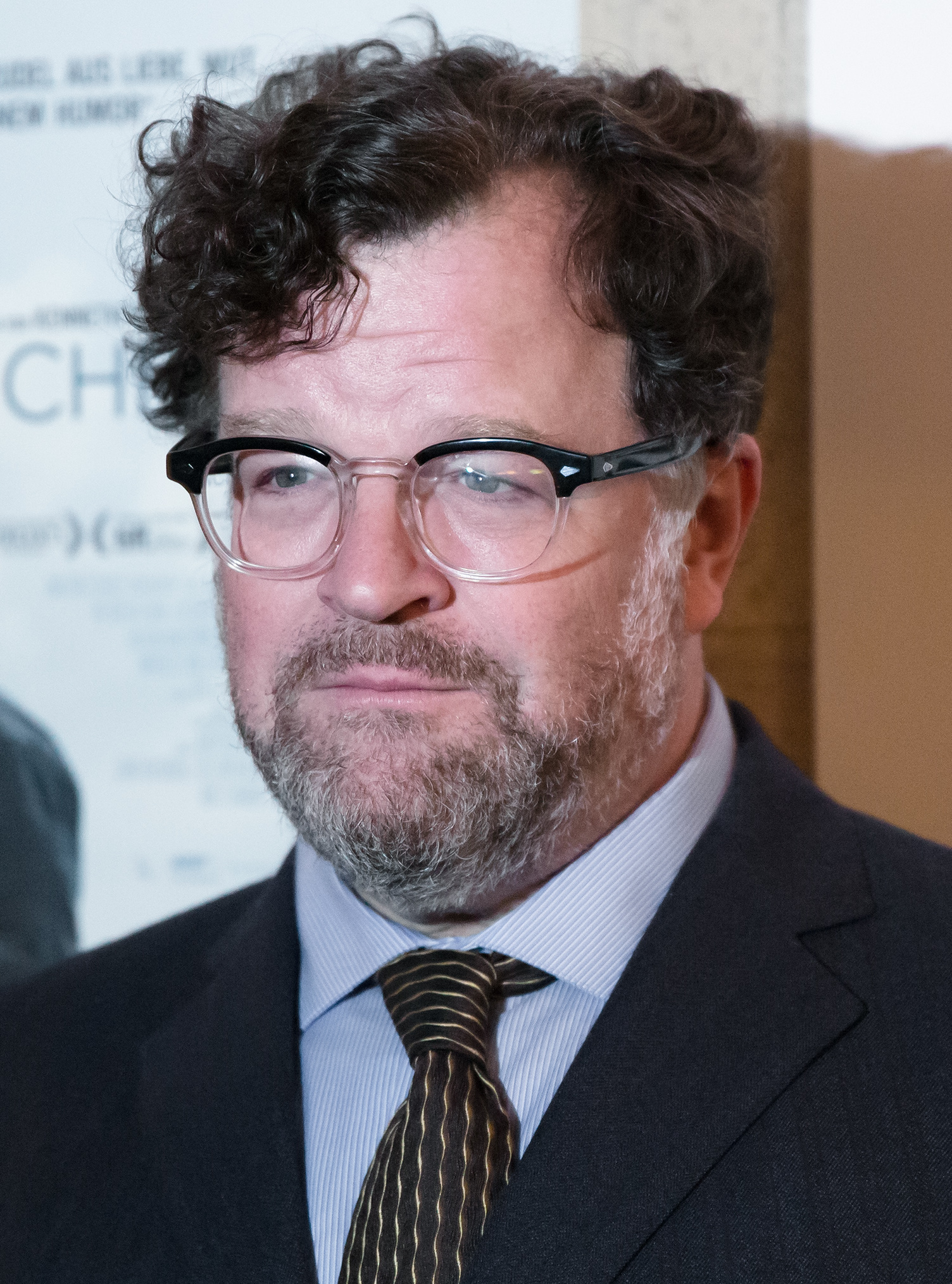
Kenneth Lonergan, Best Screenplay winner

=== Best Picture ===
1. Yi Yi
2. Traffic
3. The House of Mirth

=== Best Director ===
1. Steven Soderbergh – Traffic and Erin Brockovich
2. Edward Yang – Yi Yi
3. Ang Lee – Crouching Tiger, Hidden Dragon (Wo hu cang long)

=== Best Actor ===
1. Javier Bardem – Before Night Falls
2. Mark Ruffalo – You Can Count on Me
3. Tom Hanks – Cast Away

=== Best Actress ===
1. Laura Linney – You Can Count on Me
2. Gillian Anderson – The House of Mirth
3. Ellen Burstyn – Requiem for a Dream

=== Best Supporting Actor ===
1. Benicio del Toro – Traffic
2. Fred Willard – Best in Show
3. Willem Dafoe – Shadow of the Vampire

=== Best Supporting Actress ===
1. Elaine May – Small Time Crooks
2. Frances McDormand – Almost Famous and Wonder Boys
3. Marcia Gay Harden – Pollock

=== Best Screenplay ===
1. Kenneth Lonergan – You Can Count on Me
2. Steve Kloves – Wonder Boys
3. Stephen Gaghan – Traffic

=== Best Cinematography ===
1. Agnès Godard – Beau Travail
2. Peter Pau – Crouching Tiger, Hidden Dragon (Wo hu cang long)
2. Steven Soderbergh – Traffic

=== Best Non-Fiction Film ===
1. The Life and Times of Hank Greenberg
2. Dark Days
3. The Original Kings of Comedy

=== Experimental Film Award ===
- The Heart of the World

=== Film Heritage Award ===
- The National Film Preservation Foundation for "Treasures from American Film Archives," its four-DVD anthology of 50 films, "for preserving and propagating a body of films of cultural and historical significance, with an emphasis on non-Hollywood films."

=== Special Citation ===
- Michelangelo Antonioni
