= 2000 New York Film Critics Circle Awards =

66th New York Film Critics Circle Awards

66th New York Film Critics Circle Awards

January 14, 2001

Best Picture:
Traffic

The 66th New York Film Critics Circle Awards, honoring the best in film for 2000, were announced on 13 December 2000 and presented on 14 January 2001 by the New York Film Critics Circle.

== Winners ==
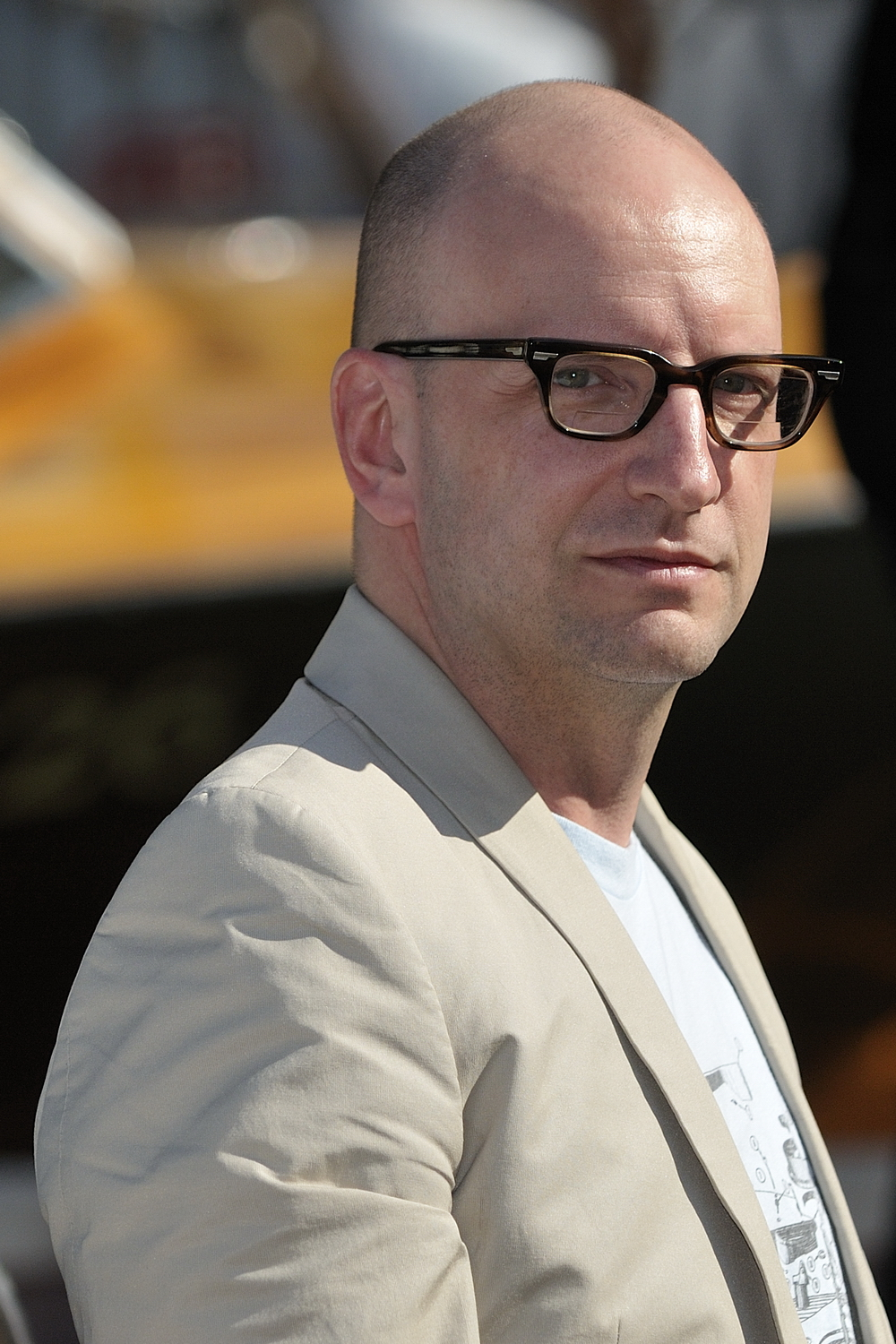
Steven Soderbergh, Best Director winner

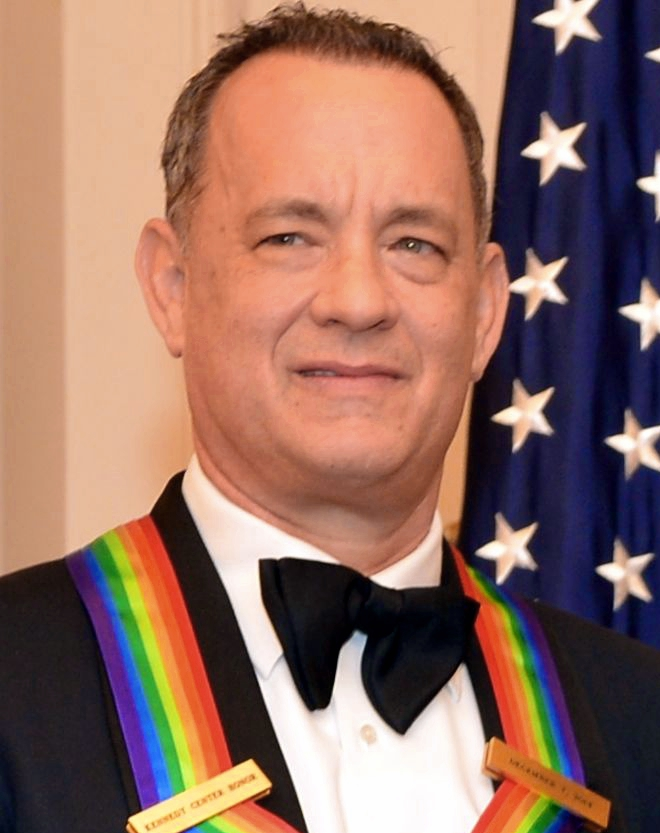
Tom Hanks, Best Actor winner

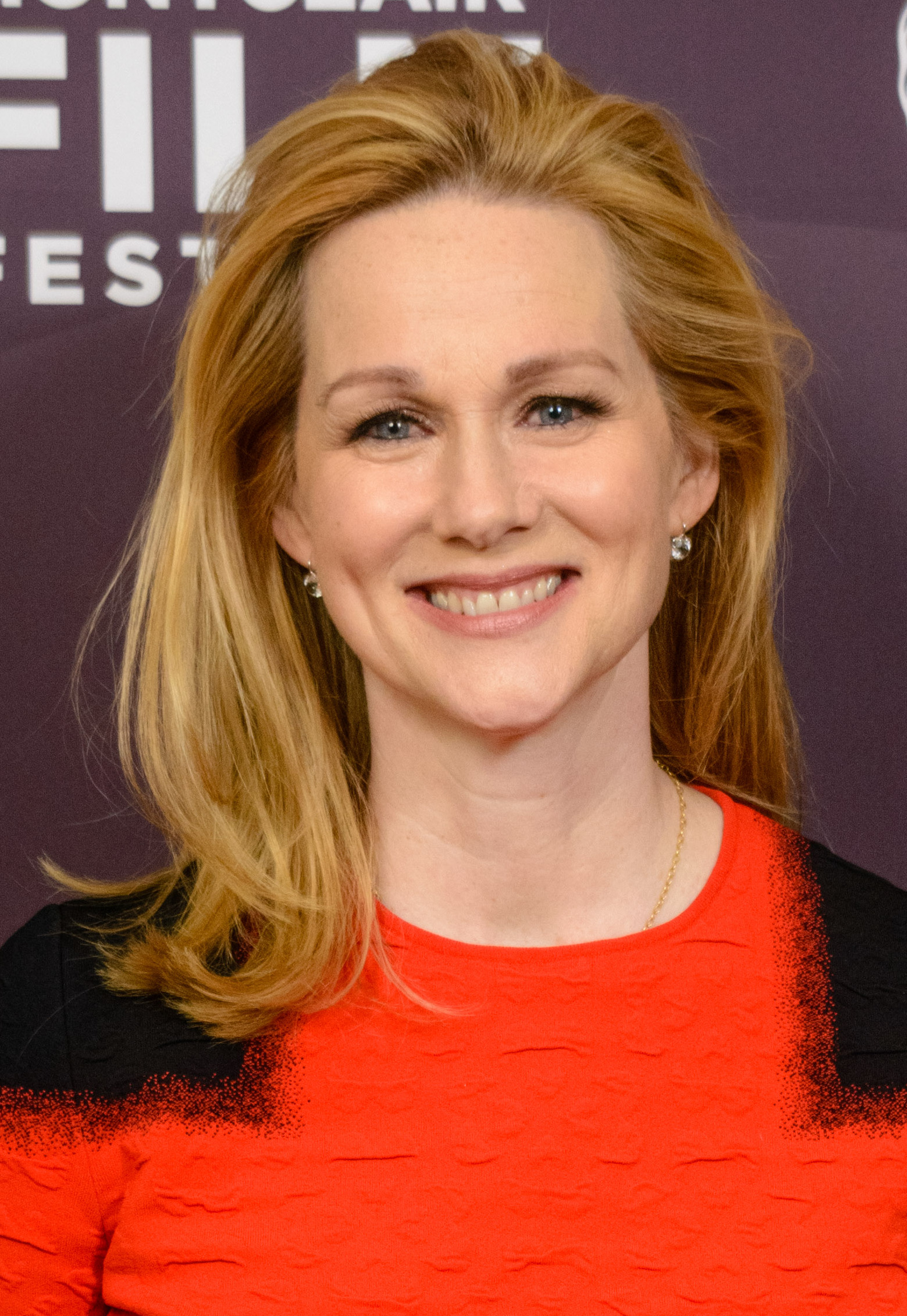
Laura Linney, Best Actress winner

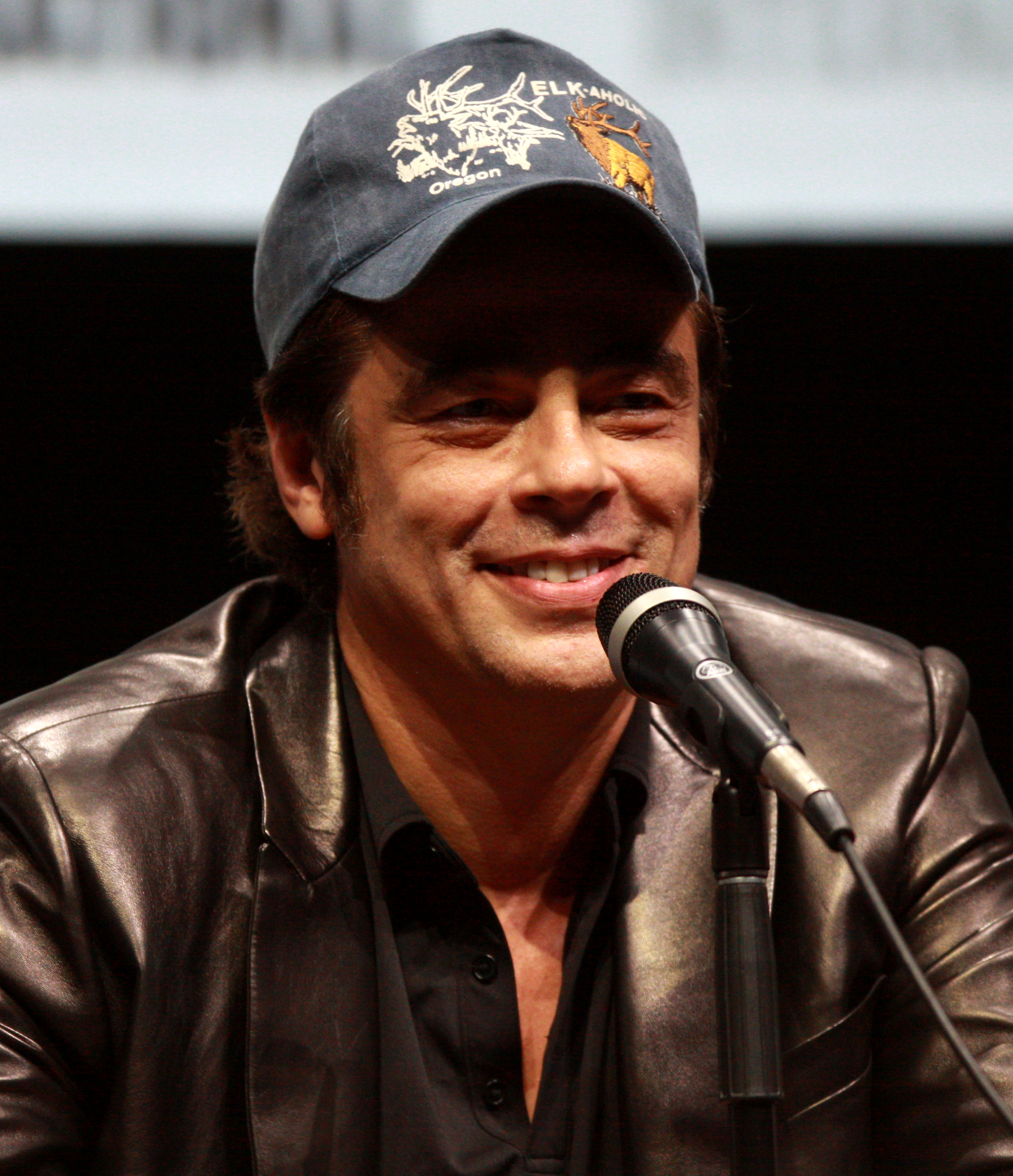
Benicio del Toro, Best Supporting Actor winner

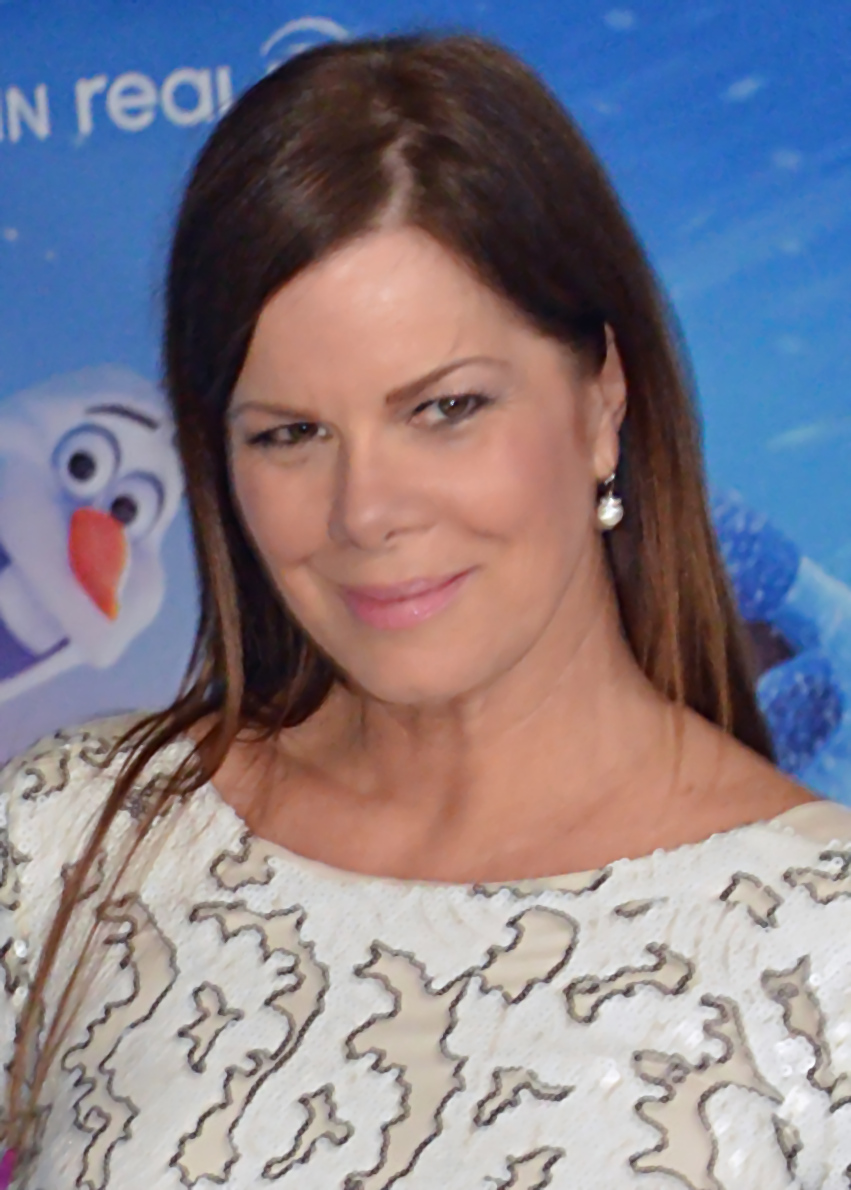
Marcia Gay Harden, Best Supporting Actress winner

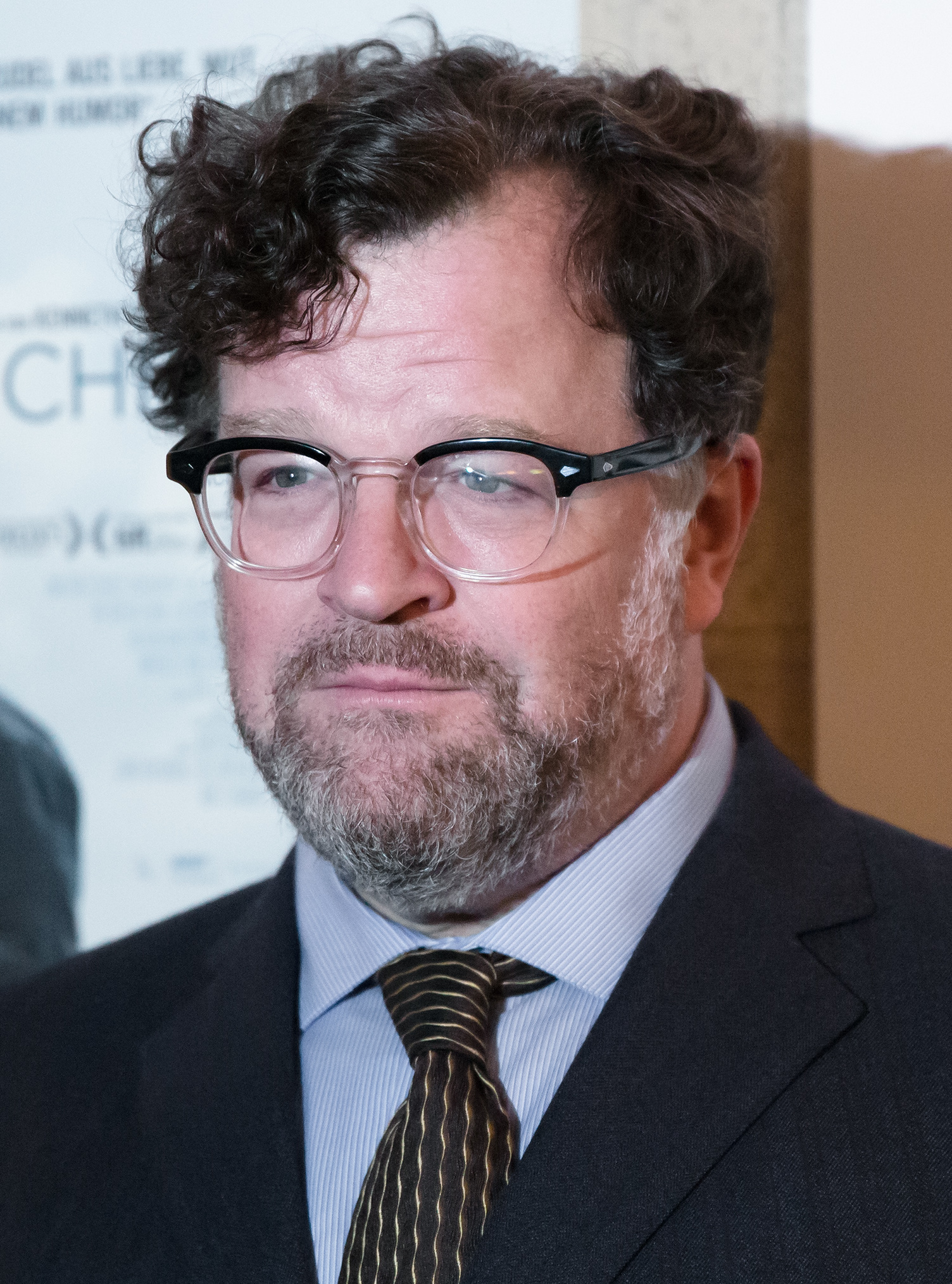
Kenneth Lonergan, Best Screenplay winner

- Best Actor:
  - Tom Hanks – Cast Away
  - Runners-up: Benicio del Toro – Traffic and Javier Bardem – Before Night Falls
- Best Actress:
  - Laura Linney – You Can Count on Me
  - Runners-up: Gillian Anderson – The House of Mirth and Björk – Dancer in the Dark
- Best Animated Film:
  - Chicken Run
- Best Cinematography:
  - Peter Pau – Crouching Tiger, Hidden Dragon (Wo hu cang long)
- Best Director:
  - Steven Soderbergh – Erin Brockovich and Traffic
  - Runners-up: Ang Lee – Crouching Tiger, Hidden Dragon (Wo hu cang long) and Terence Davies – The House of Mirth
- Best Film:
  - Traffic
  - Runners-up: Crouching Tiger, Hidden Dragon (Wo hu cang long) and The House of Mirth
- Best First Film:
  - David Gordon Green – George Washington
- Best Foreign Language Film:
  - Yi Yi • Taiwan/Japan
  - Runner-up: Crouching Tiger, Hidden Dragon (Wo hu cang long) • Taiwan/Japan/United States/China
- Best Non-Fiction Film:
  - The Life and Times of Hank Greenberg
- Best Screenplay:
  - Kenneth Lonergan – You Can Count on Me
- Best Supporting Actor:
  - Benicio del Toro – Traffic
  - Runners-up: Willem Dafoe – Shadow of the Vampire and Fred Willard – Best in Show
- Best Supporting Actress:
  - Marcia Gay Harden – Pollock
  - Runners-up: Frances McDormand – Almost Famous and Ellen Burstyn – Requiem for a Dream
- Special Awards:
  - Rialto Pictures, for the re-release of Jules Dassin's Rififi
  - The Shooting Gallery, for their ingenious distribution pattern as well as their choice of films
