= Gillian Anderson =

American actress and writer (born 1968)

Gillian Anderson OBE
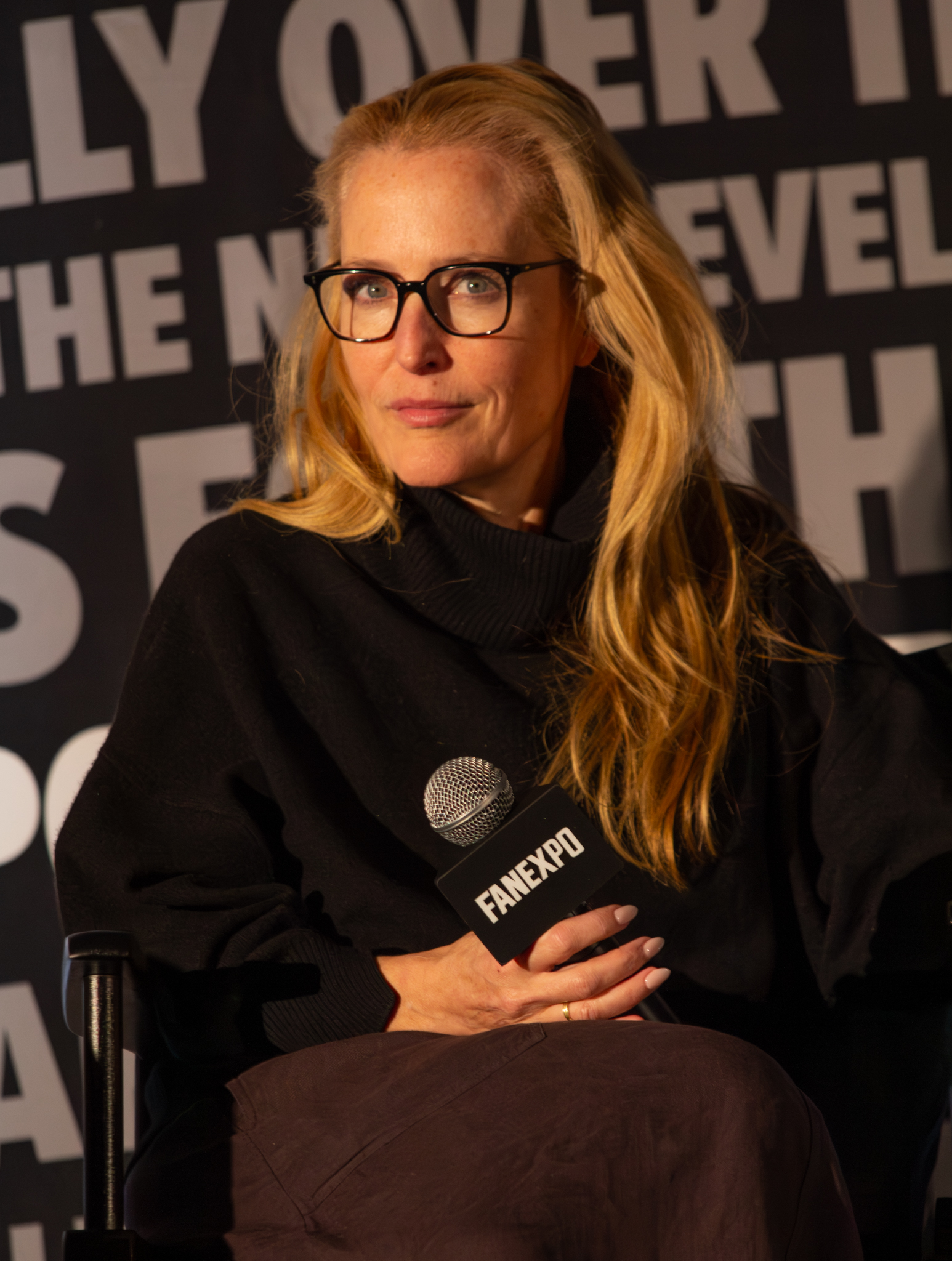
- Anderson at the 2026 Fan Expo in Denver
- Born: Gillian Leigh Anderson; August 9, 1968 (age 58); Chicago, Illinois, U.S.
- Education: DePaul University (BFA)
- Occupation: Actress
- Years active: 1983–present
- Spouses: Clyde Klotz (m. 1994; div. 1997); Julian Ozanne (m. 2004; div. 2006)
- Partners: Mark Griffiths (2006–2012); Peter Morgan (2016–present)
- Children: 3
- Awards: Full list
- Website: gilliananderson.ws

Gillian Leigh Anderson (/ˈdʒɪliən/ JIL-ee-ən; born August 9, 1968) is an American actress and writer. She received international fame for starring as FBI Special Agent Dana Scully in the Fox science fiction mystery series The X-Files (1993–2002; 2016–2018), winning a Primetime Emmy Award for the role. Her other credits include socialite Lily Bart in Terence Davies's film The House of Mirth (2000), DSU Stella Gibson in the BBC/RTÉ crime drama television series The Fall (2013–2016), sex therapist Jean Milburn in the Netflix comedy-drama Sex Education (2019–2023), and British Prime Minister Margaret Thatcher in the fourth season of Netflix drama series The Crown (2020), for which she earned her second Golden Globe and Primetime Emmy Awards.

Born in Chicago, Anderson grew up in North London in the UK and Grand Rapids, Michigan. She graduated from The Theatre School at DePaul University in Chicago, then moved to New York City to further her acting career. After beginning her career on stage, she achieved international recognition for her role in The X-Files (1993–2002). She reprised her role in the films The X-Files: Fight the Future (1998) and The X-Files: I Want to Believe (2008) as well as a revival series from 2016 to 2018. Her film roles include in The Mighty Celt (2005), The Last King of Scotland (2006), Shadow Dancer (2012), Viceroy's House (2017), Tron: Ares (2025), and Teenage Sex and Death at Camp Miasma (2026), with further television work playing Lady Dedlock in Bleak House (2005), Wallis Simpson in Any Human Heart (2010), Miss Havisham in Great Expectations (2011), Dr. Bedelia Du Maurier in Hannibal (2013–2015), and Media in American Gods (2017).

Aside from film and television, Anderson has taken to the stage and received awards and critical acclaim. Her stage work includes Absent Friends (1991), for which she won a Theatre World Award for Best Newcomer; A Doll's House (2009), for which she was nominated for a Laurence Olivier Award, and a portrayal of Blanche DuBois in A Streetcar Named Desire (2014, 2016), winning the Evening Standard Theatre Award for Best Actress and receiving a second Laurence Olivier Award nomination for Best Actress. In 2019, she portrayed Margo Channing in the stage production of All About Eve for which she received her third Laurence Olivier Award nomination.

Over her career she has received various accolades including two Primetime Emmy Awards, two Golden Globe Awards, and four Screen Actors Guild Award as well as nominations for three Laurence Olivier Awards. She was appointed an honorary Officer of the Most Excellent Order of the British Empire (OBE) in 2016 for her services to drama. Anderson has supported numerous charities and humanitarian organizations. She is an honorary spokesperson for the Neurofibromatosis Network and a co-founder of South African Youth Education for Sustainability (SAYes). She has resided in London since 2002, after earlier years divided between the United Kingdom and the United States.

== Early life ==
Anderson was born in Chicago, Illinois, the daughter of Rosemary "Posie" Alyce (née Lane), a computer analyst, and later vice president of Neurofibromatosis Inc., the NF support group of West Michigan, and Homer Edward "Ed" Anderson III, who owned a film post-production company. She has described her upbringing as influenced by Buddhism. She is of English, German, and Irish ancestry. Soon after her birth, her parents moved to Puerto Rico for 15 months, then to London, England. The family relocated so that her father could attend the London Film School. With her parents, she lived in north London's Crouch End and Haringey. She was a pupil of Coleridge Primary School. When Anderson was 11 years old, her family returned to the United States, settling in Grand Rapids, Michigan. They continued to keep a flat in London and spent their summers there. Anderson later said that she had always intended to return to England. In Grand Rapids, she attended Fountain Elementary and City High-Middle School, a program for gifted students with a strong emphasis on the humanities.

We were in a small Republican town. There were only six punks there. We were weird. It's not like London.

— Anderson on her teenage years in Grand Rapids

Following the move to Grand Rapids, Anderson went through a rebellious stage; taking drugs, dating a much older boyfriend, and cultivating a punk appearance (dyeing her hair various colors, shaving the sides of her head, sporting a nose piercing and an all-black wardrobe). She was put in therapy at the age of 14. Anderson listened to bands such as Dead Kennedys and Skinny Puppy. She was voted by her classmates as "class clown", "most bizarre girl" and "most likely to be arrested". She was arrested on graduation night for breaking and entering into her high school in an attempt to glue the locks of the doors. She later managed to reduce the charges to trespassing.

At an early age, Anderson was interested in marine biology, but after becoming interested in theatre during her teenage years, she began acting in high school productions during her first year and later in community theatre. She also served as a student intern at the Grand Rapids Civic Theatre & School of Theatre Arts. After graduating from high school in 1986, she attended The Theatre School at DePaul University in Chicago, where she earned a Bachelor of Fine Arts in 1990. Anderson also participated in the National Theatre of Great Britain's summer program at Cornell University. To support herself financially during her student years, she worked at the Goose Island Brewpub in Chicago. After Anderson became famous, the brewery named one of their beers after her, a Belgian-style farmhouse ale called "Gillian".

Anderson is the eldest of three siblings. Her brother Aaron – who was diagnosed with neurofibromatosis – died in 2011 of a brain tumor, at the age of 30. Aaron was a DJ, a mentor, and a practicing Buddhist. He was in his second year of a PhD program in developmental psychology at Stanford University when he was diagnosed with glioblastoma in 2008. Her sister Zoe is a ceramicist, whom Anderson called "an exceptional artist". Anderson is bidialectal. With her English accent and background, she was mocked and felt out of place in the American Midwest and soon adopted a Midwestern accent. To this day, she easily shifts between her American and English accents. In May 2013, during an interview with the Milling About podcast, Anderson addressed the matter of her national identity: "I've been asked whether I feel more like a Brit than an American and I don't know what the answer to that question is. I know that I feel that London is home and I'm very happy with that as my home. I love London as a city and I feel very comfortable there. In terms of identity, I'm still a bit baffled."

== Career ==
=== 1990s ===
Anderson moved to New York when she was 22 years old, and worked as a waitress to support herself. She began her career in Alan Ayckbourn's play Absent Friends at the Manhattan Theatre Club alongside Brenda Blethyn; for her role she won the 1990–91 Theatre World Award for "Best Newcomer". Her next theatrical role was in Christopher Hampton's The Philanthropist at the Long Wharf Theatre in New Haven, Connecticut.

Anderson moved to Los Angeles in 1992 and spent a year auditioning. The same year, she appeared in her first feature-length film, The Turning, starring Karen Allen and Tess Harper. The film drama is an adaptation of the play Home Fires Burning.

Although she had once vowed she would never do television work, being out of work for a year changed her mind. Anderson recalled: "First of all, I swore I'd never move to Los Angeles, and once I did, I swore I'd never do television. It was only after being out of work for almost a year that I began going in [to auditions] on some stuff that I would pray that I wouldn't get because I didn't want to be involved in it." She broke into mainstream television in 1993 with a guest appearance on the collegiate drama, Class of '96, on the fledgling Fox Network.

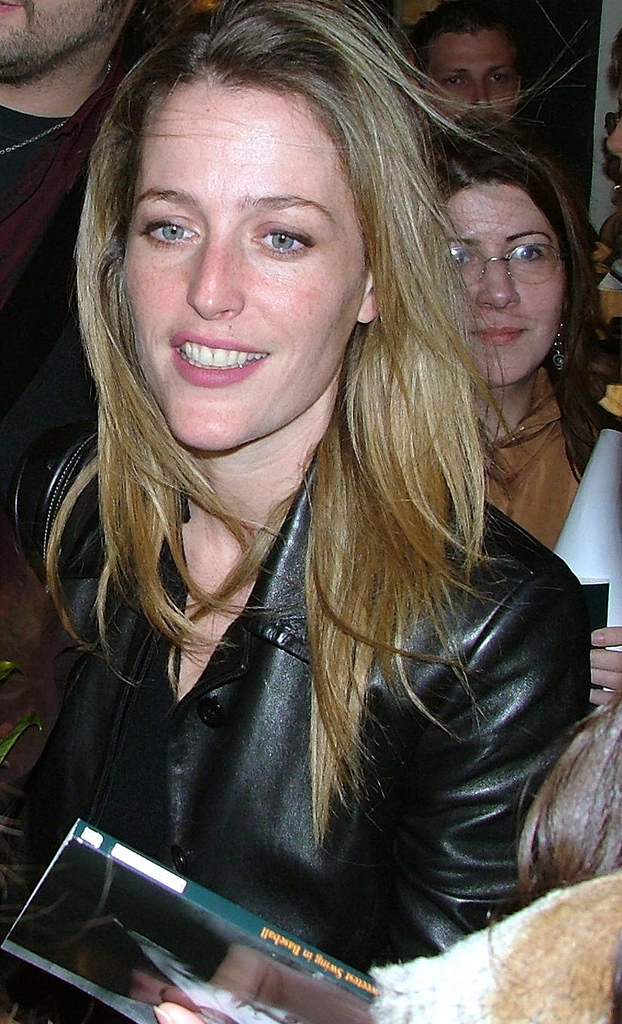
Anderson at the stage door for the play The Sweetest Swing in Baseball at the Royal Court Theatre, 2004

As a result of this guest appearance, Anderson was sent the script for The X-Files. She was 24 when she decided to audition because, "for the first time in a long time, the script involved a strong, independent, intelligent woman as a lead character." Producer Chris Carter wanted to hire her, but Fox wanted someone with previous television exposure and greater sex appeal. Fox sent in more actresses, but Carter stood by Anderson, and she was eventually cast as FBI Special Agent Dana Scully. Filmed for the first five seasons in Vancouver, British Columbia, before moving to Los Angeles, California, the series ran for nine seasons. Two related films were also produced, released in 1998 and 2008. During her time on The X-Files, Anderson won numerous awards for her portrayal of Special Agent Scully, including an Emmy Award for Outstanding Lead Actress in a Drama Series, a Golden Globe Award for Best Actress in a Television Series Drama, two Screen Actors Guild Awards for Outstanding Performance by a Female Actor in a Drama Series and a Saturn Award for Best Actress on Television. Anderson is the first actress to win an Emmy, a Golden Globe, and a SAG Award in the same year. For the role, she received a total of four Emmy nominations, four Golden Globe nominations and nine SAG nominations.

We got a lot of letters all the time, and I was told quite frequently by girls who were going into the medical world or the science world or the FBI world or other worlds that I reigned, that they were pursuing those pursuits because of the character of Scully. And I said, 'Yay!'

— Anderson on "The Scully Effect"

Anderson was the first woman to write and direct an episode of The X-Files ("all things"). During its run – between the fifth and sixth seasons – Anderson co-starred in The X-Files: Fight the Future, a 1998 film that continued The X-Files storyline. Anderson also provided the voice for a parody of her Scully character in "The Springfield Files", an episode of the animated comedy television series The Simpsons. While filming The X-Files, she met assistant art director Clyde Klotz, who became her first husband. Anderson's character on The X-Files initiated a phenomenon referred to as "The Scully Effect"; as the medical doctor and the FBI Special Agent inspired many young women to pursue careers in science, medicine, and law enforcement. It contributed to the increase in the number of women in those fields. "The Scully Effect" remains a subject of academic inquiry.

In 1996, Anderson narrated the television documentaries Spies Above and Why Planes Go Down. While hosting the BBC documentary series Future Fantastic, she became impressed by the theme music of the show, by the electronic duo Hal and initiated a collaboration with them. In 1997, Anderson provided spoken word vocals and starred in the music video for their single "Extremis", which was frequently aired on MTV. She also helped to assemble an album of electronic music, Future: A Journey Through The Electronic Underground, for Virgin Records, which won praise from European music critics.

In 1997, Anderson appeared in the independent film Chicago Cab. In 1998, she starred in the film Playing by Heart. Anderson also had a supporting role in the film The Mighty. In 1999, Anderson had a supporting role in the English-language release of Hayao Miyazaki's Princess Mononoke, where she voiced the character of Moro. Anderson is a fan of Studio Ghibli and Miyazaki's work. She also took part in Eve Ensler's The Vagina Monologues.

=== 2000s ===
In 2000, Anderson starred in the film The House of Mirth with Eric Stoltz – Terence Davies' adaptation of the Edith Wharton novel of the same name – for which she won critical acclaim and awards such as the British Independent Film Award for Best Actress, Village Voice Film Poll Best Lead Performance, and a nomination for the National Society of Film Critics Award for Best Actress.

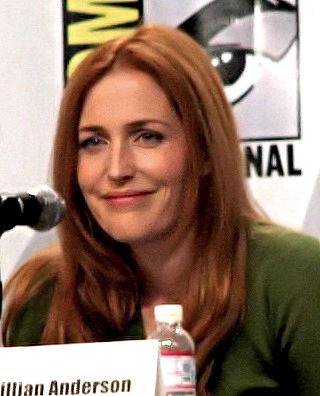
Anderson at the 2008 WonderCon

When The X-Files ended in 2002, she moved back to London for a change of pace and the opportunity to return to the stage. In 2002, Anderson made her West End debut in Michael Weller's play What The Night Is For at the Comedy Theatre. In 2004, Anderson starred in the Royal Court Theatre's production of Rebecca Gilman's play The Sweetest Swing in Baseball, as artist Dana Fielding who assumes the personality of the troubled baseball player Darryl Strawberry – a role for which she earned rave reviews.

In 2005, she appeared as Lady Dedlock in the BBC adaptation of Charles Dickens' novel Bleak House. It was her first major role since the end of X-Files, and she received critical acclaim for her portrayal of the icy aristocrat. She had a starring role in the Irish film The Mighty Celt, for which she won an IFTA award for Best International Actress. The same year she also appeared in A Cock and Bull Story with Steve Coogan and Rob Brydon – a film version of the novel Tristram Shandy. In 2006, Anderson won the Broadcasting Press Guild Television and Radio Award for Best Actress for her role in Bleak House. She was nominated for a British Academy Television Award (BAFTA) for Best Actress, she also received an Emmy nomination for Outstanding Lead Actress in a Miniseries or Movie, a nomination for a Golden Globe, a Satellite Award nomination, and came in second place in the Best Actress category of the 2005 BBC Drama website poll for her portrayal of Lady Dedlock in the adaptation.

During 2006 and 2007, Anderson appeared in two British films: The Last King of Scotland (2006) and Straightheads (2007). In 2008, Anderson hosted Masterpiece Theatre during the Jane Austen series; she was the first woman to host the series since it began in 1971. The same year, Anderson starred in the second The X-Files film, The X-Files: I Want to Believe and appeared alongside Simon Pegg in the British comedy film How to Lose Friends & Alienate People. In 2009, she starred in the British comedy film Boogie Woogie with Alan Cumming, Danny Huston and Stellan Skarsgård.

She portrayed Nora in Henrik Ibsen's A Doll's House at the Donmar Warehouse in London's West End during a limited engagement which ran from May 14, 2009, until July 18, 2009. Anderson received a nomination for the Laurence Olivier Award for Best Actress, for productions which opened in the 2009 calendar year, for her portrayal of Nora.

=== 2010s ===
In November 2010, Anderson portrayed Wallis, Duchess of Windsor in Any Human Heart – a television adaptation of William Boyd's novel of the same name, for which she was nominated for a BAFTA for Best Supporting Actress on Television. In April 2011, she starred in the BBC adaptation The Crimson Petal and the White as Mrs. Castaway, for which she was nominated for the Broadcasting Press Guild Award for Best Actress. In August 2011, she appeared in the television miniseries Moby Dick based on Herman Melville's novel Moby-Dick (1851), as Elisabeth, Ahab's wife. The same year, Anderson appeared as the head of MI7, Pamela Thornton, in the British comedy Johnny English Reborn. She starred as Miss Havisham in a three-part BBC adaptation of Great Expectations that aired in late December 2011. For her portrayal in the adaptation she won the Artistic Excellence Award, was nominated for the Critics' Choice Television Award for Best Actress in a Movie/Miniseries and for the Broadcasting Press Guild Award for Best Actress.

In 2012, Anderson appeared in a Swiss drama film, Sister, and in Shadow Dancer – a British-Irish drama film based on the novel of the same name, about the Irish republican movement. Anderson voiced the character of Dr. Miki Hokuto in the English-language version of Studio Ghibli's From Up on Poppy Hill, which was released in March 2013. The same year, she starred in the Canadian techno-thriller I'll Follow You Down and appeared in Mr. Morgan's Last Love with Michael Caine.

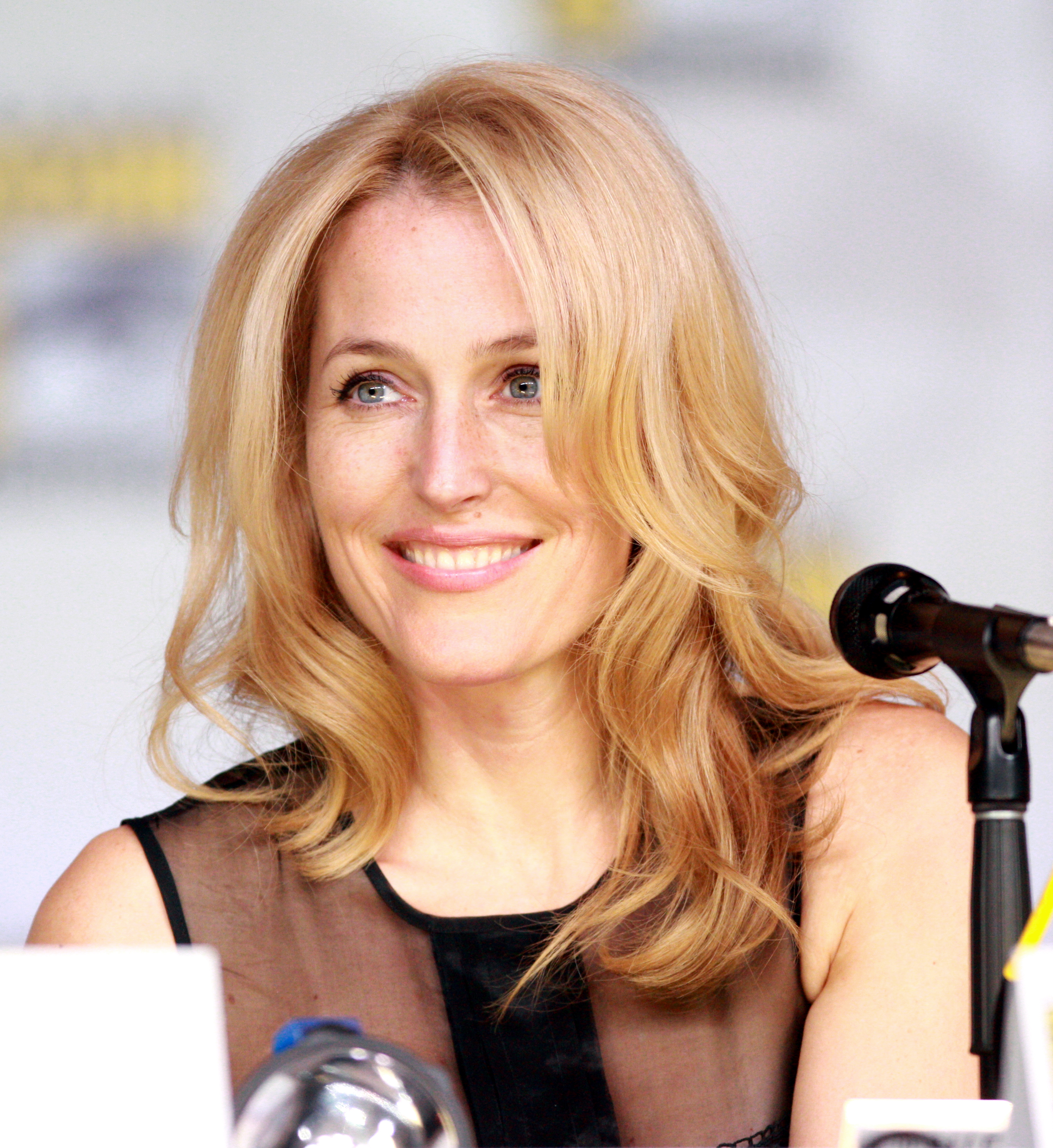
Anderson at the 2013 San Diego Comic Con International

In May 2013, Anderson began starring as DSI Stella Gibson in The Fall, a critically acclaimed crime drama series for BBC Two and RTÉ One. Anderson was praised for her portrayal of the cool, self-assured Gibson, and was nominated for several awards. She also became an executive producer for the programme from its second series. Between 2013 and 2015, Anderson played Dr. Bedelia Du Maurier, Hannibal Lecter's psychiatrist, on the NBC series Hannibal. In 2014, Anderson was promoted from a recurring character during the first two seasons, to a series regular for the third season. In 2014, Anderson starred in the British independent science fiction film Robot Overlords alongside Sir Ben Kingsley. That year, she also appeared in Jeffrey D. Brown's drama Sold, portraying Sophia, a character based on the humanitarian photographer Lisa Kristine. The film presents the issues of child trafficking and sexual slavery in India, and is based on Patricia McCormick's novel of the same name.

In July 2014, Anderson gained critical acclaim for her stage performance as Blanche DuBois in A Streetcar Named Desire by Tennessee Williams at the Young Vic Theatre in London. She won the Evening Standard Theatre Award for Best Actress and received her second Laurence Olivier Award nomination for Best Actress. The production became the fastest-selling show in the theatre's history, and the run was extended by two weeks due to the demand for tickets. In the first collaboration between the Young Vic Theatre and National Theatre Live, the show was broadcast live to over 1100 venues on September 16, 2014. Thus far, it has been screened in more than 2000 venues. In February 2015, Anderson directed and starred in a short film prequel to A Streetcar Named Desire, titled The Departure, written by novelist Andrew O'Hagan. This is part of the Young Vic's short film series, which is produced in collaboration with The Guardian.

In October 2014, Anderson published her first book, A Vision of Fire, co-authored with Jeff Rovin. The book is the first novel of what has developed as The Earthend Saga trilogy. The publisher describes it as "a science fiction thriller of epic proportions". In December 2015, Anderson and Rovin published their second novel of the trilogy, A Dream of Ice. In January 2016, Anderson portrayed Anna Pavlovna Scherer in BBC One's television adaptation War & Peace. The same month, she returned to portray FBI Special Agent Dana Scully in the six-episode tenth season of The X-Files. Anderson has fought and succeeded in securing equal pay with her male co-star on The X-Files in the '90s and again in 2015, when negotiating her salary with the network. She has always been outspoken about her struggle for equal pay in the role.

From April 23, 2016, through June 4, 2016, Anderson reprised her role of Blanche DuBois in A Streetcar Named Desire on stage at the new St. Ann's Warehouse in Brooklyn, New York City. On September 13, 2016, Anderson and Rovin published The Sound of Seas; their third and final novel of The EarthEnd Saga trilogy. The same month, she returned to portraying DSU Stella Gibson in the third series of The Fall. Anderson is the narrator of the English dub of Ronja, the Robber's Daughter – Studio Ghibli's anime, which began streaming on Amazon Prime in January 2017. In February 2017, Anderson portrayed Edwina Mountbatten in Gurinder Chadha's Partition drama film Viceroy's House (2017).

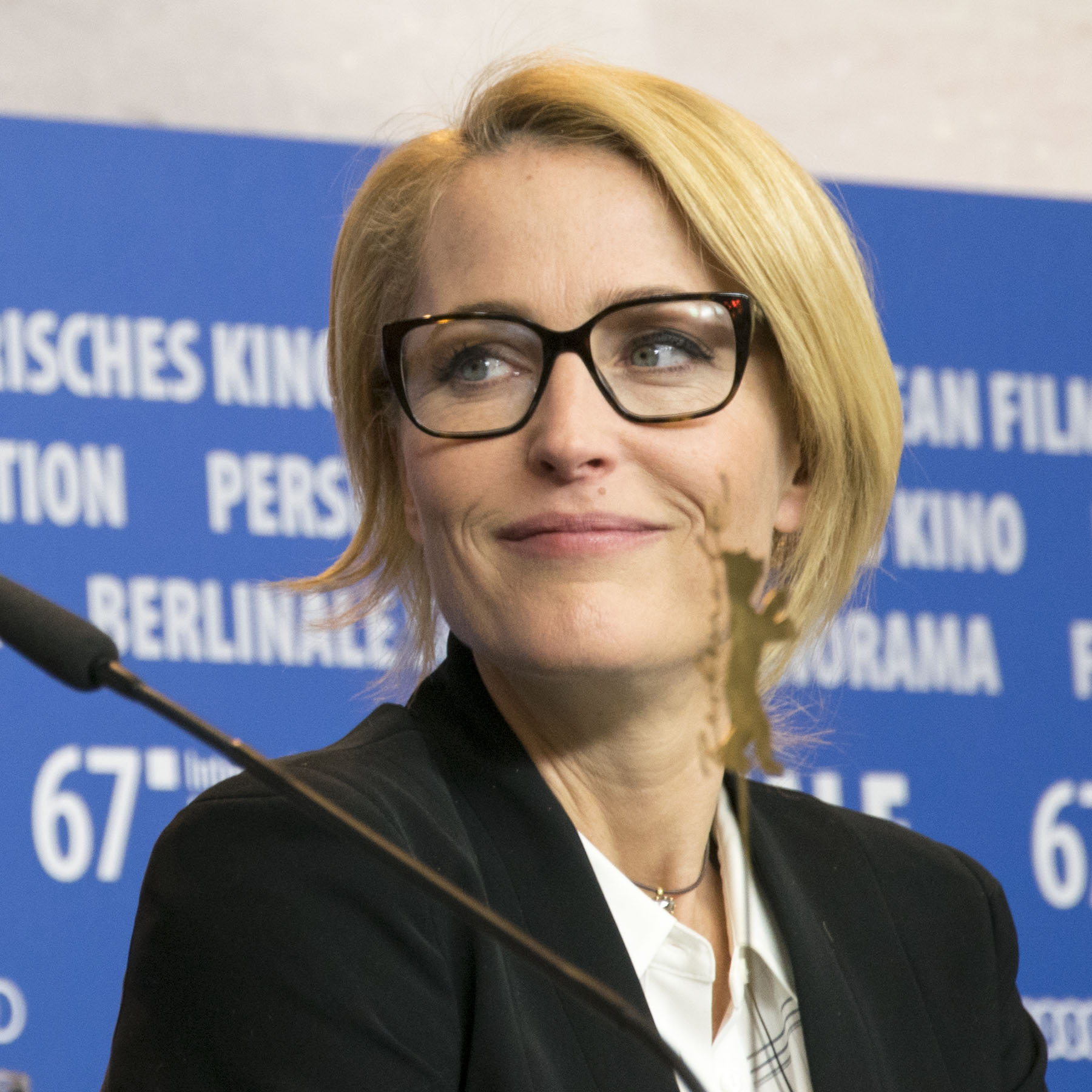
Anderson at the 2017 Berlin Film Festival

On March 7, 2017, Anderson and the journalist-activist Jennifer Nadel published their self-help guide book for women, titled WE: A Manifesto for Women Everywhere. Anderson stated that the book is a "call-out to all women around the world – and by women I include girls, transgender, anyone who identifies themselves as being intrinsically female." In April 2017, she played goddess Media in the first season of American Gods – a television series adaptation of Neil Gaiman's science fiction novel of the same name. Following the departure as showrunners of the show's creators, Bryan Fuller and Michael Green, Anderson stated she would not return to the show. In October 2017, Anderson appeared alongside Glenn Close and Christina Hendricks in Crooked House – a film adaptation of Agatha Christie's novel of the same name. In January 2018, she was back playing FBI Special Agent Dana Scully in the eleventh season of The X-Files. In January 2018, she confirmed that she would be leaving The X-Files after the end of the season. Anderson is set to portray the role of Captain MacLaren in Star Citizen's single-player component Squadron 42. In January 2019, she began playing Jean Milburn in the Netflix dramedy Sex Education.

From February 2, 2019, through May 11, 2019, Anderson portrayed Margo Channing in a stage production of All About Eve at the Noël Coward Theatre for which she received her third Laurence Olivier Award nomination. On September 7, 2019, it was announced that she will portray former British Prime Minister Margaret Thatcher in the fourth season of the Netflix historical drama series The Crown. Anderson is the second American actress (after Meryl Streep in The Iron Lady) to portray Thatcher in a major production. In a statement Anderson said: "I am so excited to be joining the cast and crew of The Crown and to have the opportunity to portray such a complicated and controversial woman, Thatcher was undoubtedly formidable but I am relishing exploring beneath the surface and, dare I say, falling in love with the icon who, whether loved or despised, defined an era."

=== 2020s ===
In February 2021, Anderson started filming White Bird. It was initially scheduled to be released on September 16, 2022, but after several delays was rescheduled for October 2024. In November 2021, Anderson voiced the cat in Robin Robin, a stop-motion short Christmas film about a bird raised by mice who is questioning where she belongs. Robin Robin was nominated for an Academy Award for Best Animated Short Film. In December 2021, she played Joanna, mother to Catherine the Great in season two of Hulu's The Great.

In February 2022, Anderson launched her first audio show titled What Do I Know?! on Curio. The fortnightly podcast explores "deeply human stories of social challenges, sexual liberation, phenomenal women". In March 2022, it was announced that Anderson had signed a first look deal with Netflix. It is a two-year deal with her company, Fiddlehead Productions. In April of the same year, she portrayed Eleanor Roosevelt in the TV series The First Lady on Showtime. The series was cancelled after the one season. Released in theatres in December 2022 and on Netflix in 2023, Anderson starred in director Scott Cooper's The Pale Blue Eye alongside Christian Bale.

In February 2023, Anderson announced her "Dear Gillian" project with Bloomsbury, where she asked for women to write letters to her personally about sexual fantasies and stories that she will turn into a book. The book, Want was released in September 2024. A follow-up book, More was released in September 2026. On February 7, 2023, Netflix announced that Anderson had been cast as Emily Maitlis in Scoop, a film about Prince Andrew's 2019 Newsnight interview. The film was released in April 2024. In April 2023, Anderson launched G Spot Beverages. The beverages are soft drinks with "life-enhancing adaptogens and nootropics". On May 16, it was announced that Anderson would star in the film adaptation of Raynor Winn's bestselling memoir The Salt Path alongside Jason Isaacs which would be directed by Marianne Elliott. In June 2023, Anderson signed on to The Abandons on Netflix. Filming was due to take place in late 2023 but was pushed back till 2024 due to the SAG and writers' strikes and was released in 2025.

In January 2024, Anderson joined the cast of Disney's Tron: Ares. In August 2024, Anderson signed on to the adaptation of Louise Kennedy's Trespasses. In an interview with Bustle in October 2024, Anderson announced she would be co-producing the adaptation of The Coast Road by Alan Murrin.

In October 2025, Anderson was announced as part of the voice cast for the upcoming animated fantasy film The Turning Door, alongside Alicia Vikander, Jamie Dornan, Jodie Turner-Smith, and Bill Nighy. Anderson starred with Hannah Einbinder in the 2026 horror film Teenage Sex and Death at Camp Miasma, for which she received rave reviews. Brian Tallerico in RogerEbert.com cited her "truly glorious Norma Desmond performance ... Anderson is mesmerizing."

In March 2026 it was announced that Anderson would star in Who's Afraid of Virginia Woolf from September to December 2026 alongside Billy Crudup @sohoplace London, directed by Marianne Elliott.

== Personal life ==
Anderson is an art collector. She used her first paycheck from the X-Files to purchase a David Blackburn lithograph. Her collection includes work by artists such as Diane Arbus, Helen Levitt, Cindy Sherman, Francesco Clemente, Alexis Rockman and Kiki Smith. Anderson enjoys architecture and interior design; she periodically works on floor and house planning projects. She has also expressed a desire to pursue mixed media ventures in the future.

Anderson is a committed feminist. In an August 2014 interview with Glamour magazine, Anderson said: "I have feminist bones and when I hear things or see people react to women in certain ways I have very little tolerance." Anderson has several tattoos; all of them, as she described, are in some way about "peace of mind, right mind, right action". She practices meditation daily.

Anderson is bidialectal and is comfortable switching between both American and British (Received Pronunciation) accents.

=== Relationships and children ===
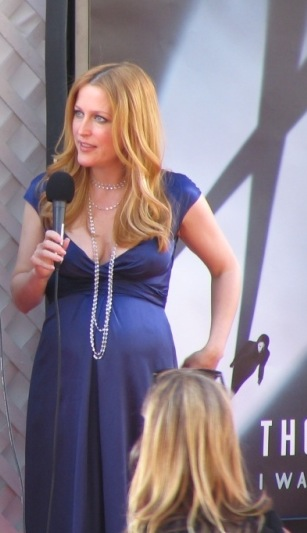
Anderson pregnant with her son Felix at the premiere of The X-Files: I Want to Believe, July 25, 2008

Anderson married her first husband, Clyde Klotz, an X-Files assistant art director, on New Year's Day 1994, in Hawaii in a Buddhist ceremony. Their daughter was born on September 25, 1994. The series' creator, Chris Carter, Piper's godfather, named an X-Files episode after her. Anderson and Klotz divorced in 1997. On December 29, 2004, Anderson married Julian Ozanne, a documentarian, on Lamu Island, off the coast of Kenya. Anderson announced their separation on April 21, 2006. Anderson and former partner, businessman Mark Griffiths, have two sons. She ended their relationship in 2012.

In March 2012, Anderson told Out magazine about her long-term relationship with a girl in high school. She then told CBS News that she had dated other women, though most of her relationships had been with men. In an interview with the London Evening Standard in December 2014, she stated: "I am an actively heterosexual woman who celebrates however people want to express their sexuality." Anderson also identified as heterosexual in a January 2015 interview. In an interview with The Daily Telegraph in March 2015, Anderson said she was not closed to the idea of entering another same-sex relationship, adding: "To me a relationship is about loving another human being; their gender is irrelevant." She reiterated this to The Times in 2018, saying "I could be with a woman next year." In 2024 Anderson made further comments about her sexual identity. "The experience of working on the book made Anderson think about her own sexual identity in terms she had never before considered. "Now, at the age of fifty-five, I am thinking, Oh, am I pansexual? Am I bisexual?" she said. Had her same-sex relationships come to light when she was starting out as an actor, Anderson told me, it would have defined her in a way that might have detracted from what she sought to achieve artistically. In this era, she is careful not to overstate her sexual experience with women—not out of fear of being labelled, but in order not to be seen as appropriating an identity to which she might not truly be able to lay claim." In an August 2026 interview with The Times, she stated that when she was younger, "there were parts of [her] brain that thought [relationships with women] were temporary," but now, "The person I consider my life partner happens to be male, but I think I would feel the same way if it were a woman." In a September 2026 interview with The Australian, Anderson identified herself as pansexual.

Anderson resides with her three children in London, where she has lived since 2002. She has been in a longtime relationship with British playwright and screenwriter Peter Morgan since 2016 apart from a short break in 2020.

== Activism and charity work ==
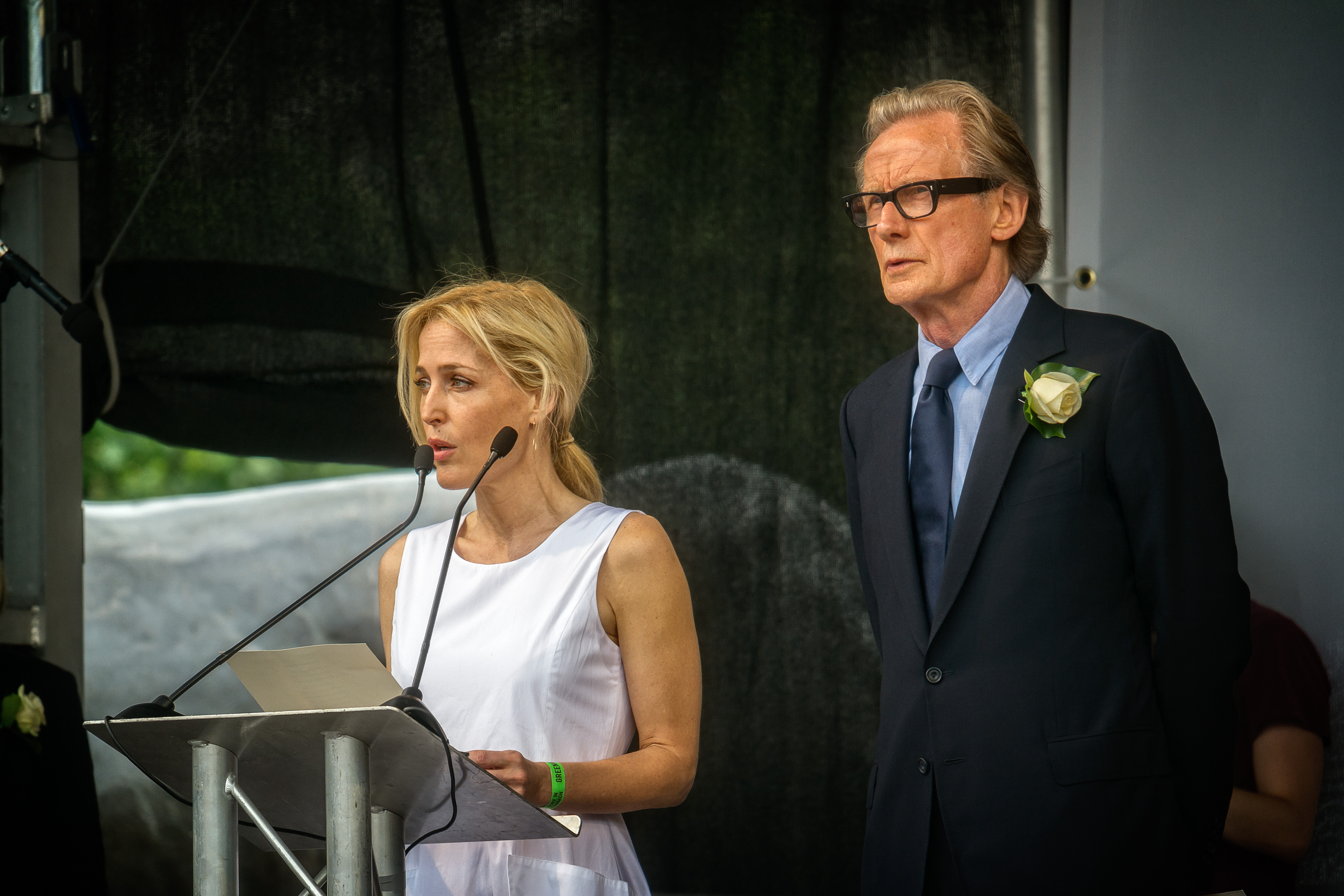
Anderson and Bill Nighy during Jo Cox's birthday memorial at Trafalgar Square in London, June 22, 2016

Anderson has been active in supporting numerous charity organizations, global and social causes, as well as running her own humanitarian ventures. She supports The Trevor Project organization, focused on suicide prevention efforts among LGBTQ youth and attended three of the Trevor Project's "Cracked X-Mas" events to benefit the organization. In 2013, Anderson was made a patron of the Charles Dickens Statue Fund, and was instrumental in securing the funding for UK's first Dickens statue, located in Portsmouth, Hampshire. In June 2016 she became a patron of the Temple Legal Centre, a London-based organization that assists people through the legal process by providing them free family law advice and support. In June 2016, Anderson expressed her support for the United Kingdom to remain a member of the European Union in the run-up to June's referendum on that issue. In January 2018, Anderson was given a City Lit Lifetime Fellowship Award by the adult education college City Literary Institute.

=== Neurofibromatosis ===
Anderson is an honorary spokeswoman for the Neurofibromatosis Network. She often holds auctions with the profits benefiting the NF Network. Her brother Aaron died from Neurofibromatosis type I in 2011. In May 1996, Anderson addressed the United States Congress urging for more education and funding for NF research projects. She partners with Doodle 4 NF – an annual fundraiser for the NF Network. She also supported the Children with Tumours organization and the Global Genes movement, which is devoted to helping children with NF.

=== Africa and SAYes ===
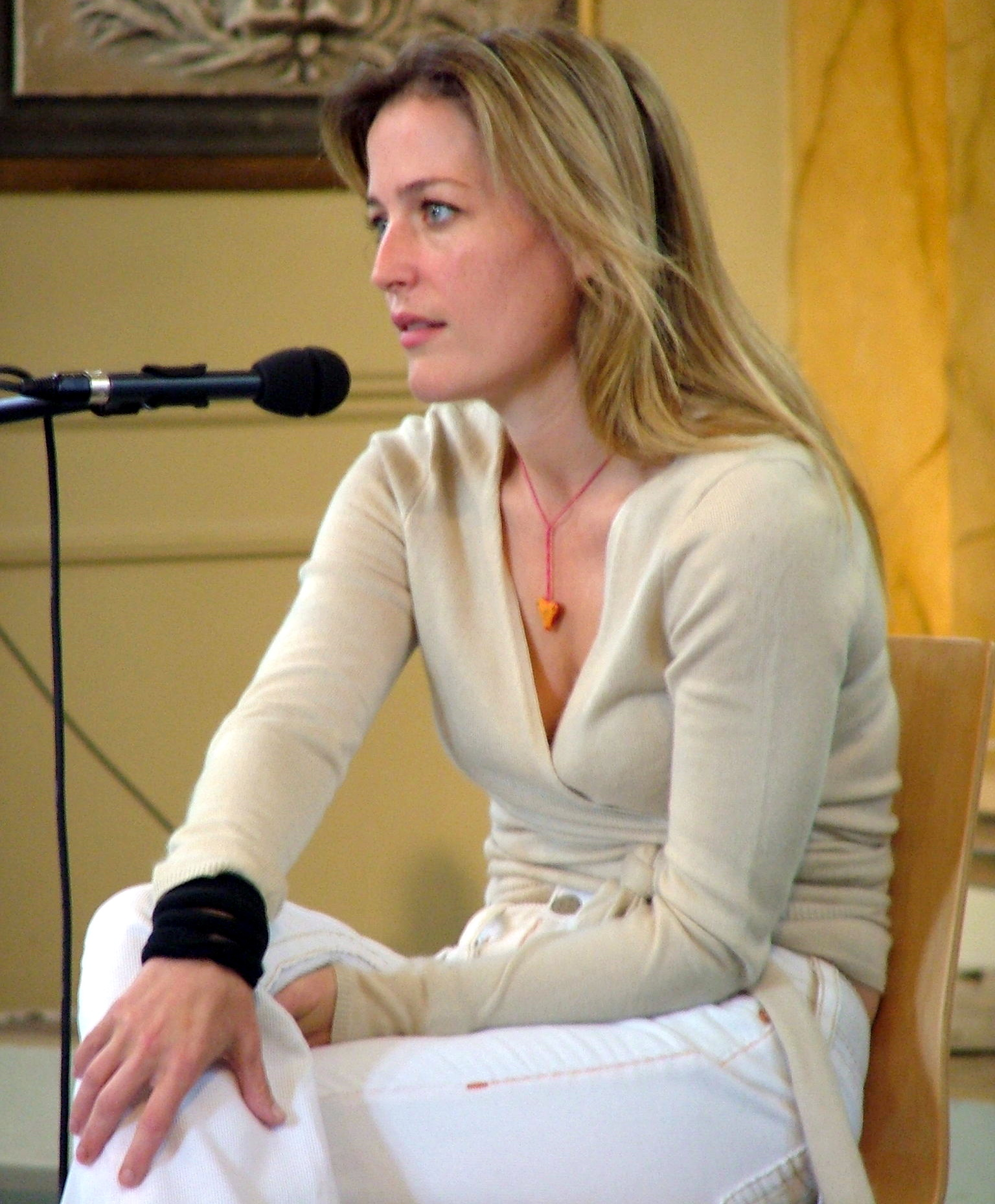
Anderson during Buskaid charity event at St Mary's, Bryanston Square in London, July 10, 2004

In 2008, Anderson co-founded South African Youth Education for Sustainability (SAYes), which helps in empowering marginalised young people in South Africa through youth mentoring. The nonprofit organization provides youth leaving children's homes with guidance that enables them to develop their skills, further their education, and source suitable housing in order to participate in society as independent adults.

While filming The Last King of Scotland in 2005, Anderson started a crowdfunding venture that benefited the Alinyiikira Junior School in Kampala, Uganda. She ran the philanthropic project until 2011. Anderson is a member of the board of directors for Artists for a New South Africa and a campaigner for ACTSA: Action for Southern Africa. She was a patron of the Friends of Treatment Action Campaign (FoTAC) which worked with the Treatment Action Campaign in South Africa to ensure greater access to treatment to reduce the effects of HIV and prevent new infections. Anderson also supported Buskaid – a charitable trust aiming to help young black musicians in South Africa.

=== Women's rights ===
Anderson is a supporter of various women's organizations and social movements. She has been a long-time supporter of the Feminist Majority Foundation (FMF). In 1996, Anderson became FMF's spokeswoman and participated as a team leader in the FMF's Million4Roe campaign. In March 1999, she attended an FMF event to stop gender apartheid in Afghanistan and in April 2002, she appeared on Hollywood Squares to benefit the FMF's campaign to aid Afghan women and girls. Anderson participated in Eve Ensler's Vagina Monologues, including a stage performance on February 14, 1999. Anderson is a supporter of Ensler's V-Day movement aiming to end violence against women and girls.

Anderson is an advocate for reproductive rights. In 2001, she emceed the Rock for Choice concert fundraiser, featuring musicians Sarah McLachlan, Paula Cole, and Melissa Etheridge as well as actresses Helen Hunt, Ellen DeGeneres, Portia de Rossi, and Kathy Najimy. The concert supported reproductive options for unplanned pregnancies, including the morning-after pill. For International Women's Day 2014, Anderson was one of the artist signatories of Amnesty International's letter to UK Prime Minister David Cameron campaigning for women's rights in Afghanistan. In March 2015, Anderson backed the Women at the Well drop-in centre for vulnerable women in London, which is supported financially by Comic Relief. Anderson supports the Refuge, a United Kingdom charity providing specialist support for women and children experiencing domestic violence. For International Women's Day 2016, Anderson was one of the high-profile women that signed Burma Campaign UK's pledge to end and investigate crimes of sexual violence against girls and women in Myanmar. Anderson is a speaker for Thomson Reuters Foundation's Trust Women Conference.

=== Children's rights ===
Anderson is a patron of Childreach International, a London-based charity that works in partnership with local communities in the developing world to secure children's basic rights; she addressed the problem of child trafficking during the press for the Sold film that presents the issue. Anderson also supports their Taught Not Trafficked campaign that was launched in July 2014. In 2015, Anderson became a patron of the International Literacy Centre (ILC) – European home of Reading Recovery. In January 2016 she helped launch ILC's Reading Recovery Read Aloud campaign. During February and March 2016, Anderson held an internet charity auction benefiting Great Ormond Street Hospital (GOSH) children's hospital in the Bloomsbury area of London. In March 2016, it was reported that Anderson is one of the artists sponsoring an unaccompanied refugee minor in the "Jungle" camp in Calais. In July 2017, Anderson was awarded a UCL Honorary Fellowship for her support of the International Literacy Centre's Reading Recovery program.

=== Indigenous rights ===
In late 2010, Anderson and other artists joined a campaign to boycott Botswana diamonds over the government's treatment of the Kalahari San. Anderson supports tribal rights charity Survival International, an organization that champions tribal peoples around the world and in early 2010 she participated in a performance in a London stage fundraiser for its cause. In February 2011, Anderson narrated a short film about recent footage of an uncontacted tribe, in which the Amazon Indians were spotted from the air on the Brazil-Peru border. Anderson has said: "What comes across powerfully from this amazing footage is how healthy and confident these people appear. I hope they can be left alone – but that will only happen if the loggers are stopped." In June 2011, Anderson became an ambassador for Survival International. In September 2015, Anderson was among the artists who signed a letter calling for a new approach to conservation that would respect tribal peoples' rights.

=== Animals rights and environmental advocacy ===
In 2012, Anderson joined Greenpeace in standing with the people of Brazil for a zero-deforestation law to save the Amazon. In 2013, she backed the Cheetah Conservation Fund by creating a short film together with the fund, advocating CCF's action to prevent the extinction of the cheetah. In 2013, she joined the Fishlove campaign, supporting the fight against unsustainable fishing practices that harm the marine ecosystem. In November 2015, Anderson was named a friend and supporter of Positive Luxury, a company that informs consumers on brands' commitment to quality, craftsmanship, service and sustainability.

== Acting credits ==
=== Film ===
Year	Title	Role	Notes
1986	Three at Once	Woman 1	Short film
1988	A Matter of Choice	Young pregnant woman	Short film
1992	The Turning	April Cavanaugh	
1997	Chicago Cab	Southside Girl or Brenda	
1998	The X-Files	FBI Special Agent Dana Scully	
1998	The Mighty	Loretta Lee	
1998	Playing by Heart	Meredith	
1999	Princess Mononoke	Moro (voice)	English dubbing
2000	The House of Mirth	Lily Bart	
2005	The Mighty Celt	Kate Morrison	
2005	A Cock and Bull Story	Herself/Widow Wadman	
2006	The Last King of Scotland	Sarah Merrit	
2007	Straightheads	Alice Comfort	
2008	The X-Files: I Want to Believe	Dana Scully	
2008	How to Lose Friends & Alienate People	Eleanor Johnson	
2009	Boogie Woogie	Jean Maclestone	
2010	No Pressure	Herself	Short film
2011	Johnny English Reborn	Pamela "Pegasus" Thornton	
2012	Sister	Kristin Jansen	
2012	Shadow Dancer	Kate Fletcher	
2012	Room on the Broom	Witch (voice)	Short film
2013	Mr. Morgan's Last Love	Karen Morgan	
2013	From Up on Poppy Hill	Dr. Miki Hokuto (voice)	English dubbing
2013	I'll Follow You Down	Marika Whyte	
2014	Sold	Sophia	
2014	Robot Overlords	Kate Flynn	
2014	The Departure	Blanche Dubois	Short film; also director
2017	Viceroy's House	Edwina Mountbatten	
2017	The Artist's Garden: American Impressionism	Narrator (voice)	Documentary
2017	Crooked House	Magda West	
2018	The Spy Who Dumped Me	Wendy	
2018	UFO	Professor Rebecca Hendricks	
2018	This Changes Everything	Herself	Documentary
2019	The Sunlit Night	Olyana Gregoriov	
2021	Robin Robin	The Cat (voice)	Short film
2022	The Pale Blue Eye	Mrs. Julia Marquis	
2024	White Bird	Vivienne Beaumier	
2024	Scoop	Emily Maitlis	
2024	The Salt Path	Raynor Winn	
2025	Tron: Ares	Elisabeth Dillinger	
2026	Teenage Sex and Death at Camp Miasma	Billy Presley	
2026	The Julia Set		Also producer
2026	Animals	Dayle Burton	
TBA	The Turning Door †	(voice)	In production

=== Television ===
Year	Title	Role	Notes
1993	Class of '96	Rachel	Episode: "The Accused"
1993–2002; 2016–2018	The X-Files	FBI Special Agent Dana Scully	213 episodes Also writer and director of "all things"
1995	Eek! the Cat	Agent Scully (voice)	Episode: "Eek Space 9"
1996	ReBoot	Data Nully (voice)	Episode: "Trust No One"
1996	Why Planes Go Down	Narrator (voice)	Documentary
1996	Spies Above	Narrator (voice)	Documentary
1996	Future Fantastic	Narrator (voice)	9 episodes
1996–2002	Hollywood Squares	Herself	5 episodes
1997	The Simpsons	Agent Scully (voice)	Episode: "The Springfield Files"
1999	Frasier	Jenny (voice)	Episode: "Dr. Nora"
1999	Harsh Realm	Narrator (voice)	Uncredited; Episode: "Pilot"
2005	Bleak House	Lady Honoria Dedlock	14 episodes
2007	Robbie the Reindeer	Queen Vorkana (voice)	Episode: "Close Encounters of the Herd Kind"
2008	Masterpiece	Herself	Episode: "Sense and Sensibility"
2010	Any Human Heart	Wallis, Duchess of Windsor	3 episodes
2011	The Crimson Petal and the White	Mrs. Castaway	2 episodes
2011	Moby Dick	Elizabeth	2 episodes
2011	Great Expectations	Miss Havisham	3 episodes
2013–2016	The Fall	DSU Stella Gibson	17 episodes; also executive producer
2013–2015	Hannibal	Dr. Bedelia Du Maurier	15 episodes
2014	Crisis	Meg Fitch	10 episodes
2014	Robot Chicken	Fairy Godmother/Fiona (voice)	Episode: "Up, Up, and Buffet"
2014	National Theatre Live	Blanche DuBois	Episode: "A Streetcar Named Desire"
2015	The Widowmaker	Narrator	Voice; Documentary
2016	War & Peace	Anna Pavlovna Scherer	4 episodes
2017	Ronja, the Robber's Daughter	Narrator (voice)	26 episodes
2017	American Gods	Media	4 episodes
2019–2023	Sex Education	Jean Milburn	Main role, 32 episodes
2020	The Crown	Margaret Thatcher	6 episodes
2021	The Great	Johanna	2 episodes
2022	The First Lady	Eleanor Roosevelt	10 episodes
2025	Trespasses	Gina Lavery	Miniseries
2025	The Abandons	Constance Van Ness	Main role, 7 episodes
TBA	The Boys from Brazil †	Frieda Steiner	Miniseries

=== Video games ===
Year	Title	Role
1996	Hellbender	E.V.E. (Enhanced Virtual Entity)
1998	The X-Files Game	Dana Scully
2004	The X-Files: Resist or Serve	Dana Scully
2020	Squadron 42	Captain Rachel MacLaren

=== Music videos ===
Year	Song title	Artist	Director
1997	"Extremis"	Hal featuring Gillian Anderson	David McNabb

=== Stage ===
Year	Title	Role	Director	Playwright	Venue
1983	Arsenic and Old Lace	Officer Brophy	—N/a	Joseph Kesselring	City High School, Grand Rapids, Michigan
1990	A Flea in Her Ear	Eugenie	—N/a	Georges Feydeau	The Theatre School, DePaul University, Chicago, Illinois
1991	Absent Friends	Evelyn	Lynne Meadow	Alan Ayckbourn	Manhattan Theatre Club, New York City
1992	The Philanthropist	Celia	Gordon Edelstein	Christopher Hampton	Long Wharf Theatre, New Haven, Connecticut
1999–2000	The Vagina Monologues	—N/a	Eve Ensler	Eve Ensler	Los Angeles & London
2002–2003	What The Night Is For	Melinda Metz	John Caird	Michael Weller	Comedy Theatre, London
2004	The Sweetest Swing in Baseball	Dana Fielding	Ian Rickson	Rebecca Gilman	Royal Court Theatre, London
2009	A Doll's House	Nora Vaughan	Kfir Yefet	Henrik Ibsen	Donmar Warehouse, London
2010	We Are One: A celebration of tribal peoples	—N/a	Mark Rylance	Joanna Eede (author)	Apollo Theatre, London
2013	Letters Live	—N/a	—N/a	—N/a	The Tabernacle, Notting Hill, London
2014	A Streetcar Named Desire	Blanche DuBois	Benedict Andrews	Tennessee Williams	Young Vic, London
2016	Letters Live	—N/a	—N/a	—N/a	Freemasons' Hall, London
2016	A Streetcar Named Desire	Blanche DuBois	Benedict Andrews	Tennessee Williams	St. Ann's Warehouse, New York City
2016	Letters Live	—N/a	—N/a	—N/a	Freemasons' Hall, London
2019	All About Eve	Margo Channing	Ivo van Hove	Mary Orr / Joseph L. Mankiewicz	Noël Coward Theatre, West End
2019	Whodunnit [Unrehearsed]	Police Inspector	—N/a	Jez Bond & Mark Cameron	Park Theatre (London)
2022	Whodunnit [Unrehearsed] 2	Police Inspector	—N/a	Jez Bond & Mark Cameron	Park Theatre (London)
2024	Whodunnit [Unrehearsed] 3	Police Inspector	—N/a	Jez Bond & Mark Cameron	Park Theatre (London)
2026	Whodunnit [Unrehearsed] 4	Sheriff	Jez Bond	Jez Bond & Mark Cameron	Park Theatre (London)
2026	Who's Afraid of Virginia Woolf?	Martha	Marianne Elliott	Edward Albee	@sohoplace, London

=== Radio ===
Year	Title	Role	Channel
2007	84, Charing Cross Road	Helene Hanff	BBC Radio 4

=== Voice work ===
- Narrator of Anne Rice's novel Exit to Eden (1992).
- Narrator of The X-Files: Ground Zero (1997).
- Narrator of "The Guardian of the Pool: A Story from Nelson Mandela's Favorite African Folktales" (2009).
- Narrated the story "Reversal" from David Eagleman's speculative fiction book Sum: Forty Tales from the Afterlives (2010).
- Narrated Charlotte Brontë's lost story "L'Ingratitude" for London Review of Books's podcast (2012).
- Narrator of Roald Dahl's short story "The Last Act", which is included in the Switch Bitch collection (2012).
- Narrated the audiobooks of her novel trilogy The Earthend Saga: A Vision of Fire (2014), A Dream of Ice (2015) and The Sound of Seas (2016).
- One of the narrators of BBC Radio 4's ongoing series A History of Ideas (2015).
- Provided a voice recording of reading Virginia Woolf's suicide note for The Royal Ballet production Woolf Works (2015).
- Narrated Wilkie Collins' short story "Mrs. Zant and the Ghost" for Audible UK's Christmas Car Selection (2015).
- Co-narrator of the audiobook for her and Nadel's self-empowerment book WE: A Manifesto for Women Everywhere (2017).
- Provided the voice of Dana Scully for The X-Files: Cold Cases and The X-Files: Stolen Lives audiobooks (2017).
- Narrated the documentary series Sara Price: Chasing Dakar (2026) about Sara Price competing in the 2026 Dakar Rally.

== Discography ==
- Hal featuring Gillian Anderson – Extremis EP (1997), Virgin Records. Chart positions: UK #23, Scotland #19.

== Bibliography ==
- Anderson, Gillian & Rovin, Jeff (2014). A Vision of Fire. The EarthEnd Saga No. 1. New York: Simon & Schuster. ISBN 978-1-4767-7652-1.
- Anderson, Gillian & Rovin, Jeff (2015). A Dream of Ice. The EarthEnd Saga No. 2. New York: Simon & Schuster. ISBN 978-1-4767-7655-2.
- Anderson, Gillian & Rovin, Jeff (2016). The Sound of Seas. The EarthEnd Saga No. 3. New York: Simon & Schuster. ISBN 978-1-4767-7659-0.
- Anderson, Gillian & Nadel, Jennifer (2017). WE: A Manifesto for Women Everywhere. New York: Simon & Schuster (US), ISBN 978-1-5011-2627-7. HarperCollins (UK), ISBN 978-0-00-814793-8.
- Anderson, Gillian & anonymous contributors (2024). Want. ISBN 9781526680570.
- Anderson, Gillian & anonymous contributors (2026). More. ISBN 9781419777318.

== Awards and honors ==
In 2009, Anderson was named as one of 20 most powerful women in British theatre and was dubbed "The Honorary Brit" by Harper's Bazaar and Tiffany & Co.'s list. In 2010, Anderson was named Honorary Associate of The London Film School (LFS).

In 2016, Anderson was appointed an honorary Officer of the Most Excellent Order of the British Empire (OBE) for her services to drama. In 2018, she received a star on the Hollywood Walk of Fame.

Preceded by Russell Baker	Host of Masterpiece Classic; 2008–2009	Succeeded by Laura Linney
