= Niyar Saikia =

Indian actress

- Born: Niyar Saikia; 9 November 1999 (age 26); Guwahati, Assam, India
- Occupations: Actress, Dancer
- Years active: 2005–present
- Parent(s): Probin Saikia, Roshmi Rekha Saikia

Niyar Saikia (Assamese: নিয়ৰ শইকিয়া; born 9 November 1999) is an Indian actress. She played Lakshmi in Jeffrey D. Brown's film Sold.

== Early life ==
Saikia was born in Guwahati, Assam, as the daughter of musicians Probin Saikia and Roshmi Rekha Saikia. She is a student of folk dances and songs of Assam at the Panchasur Institute and at the Seagull theatre. Saikia is training under Padmashree Awardee and Nrityacharya, Shri Jatin Goswami for Sattriya.

== Career ==
Saikia started acting at age 5. Her first (unreleased) film was Butterfly Chase, directed by Jahnu Baruah. Niyar started performing in theatre and soaps and received a Best Actress award in the All India Multi-Lingual Children Play ad Dance competition-Cuttack (Orissa), portraying a girl named Dhunumoina. Saikia acted in Assamese and Hindi films before she was cast in Sold in 2014. The film is directed by Oscar-winning director Jeffrey D. Brown and based on Patricia McCormick's novel Sold. She was selected for the role after casting director Tess Joseph auditioned more than a thousand girls in Nepal and India. Saikia played the role of a trafficked Nepalese child, Lakshmi, who is sold off to a brothel in Kolkata.

== Filmography ==
- Sold, as Lakshmi
- Aai Kot Nai
- Main Ganga
- Butterfly Chase
- Ami Axomiya
- Joymoti
