= List of awards and nominations received by Gillian Anderson =

Gillian Anderson awards
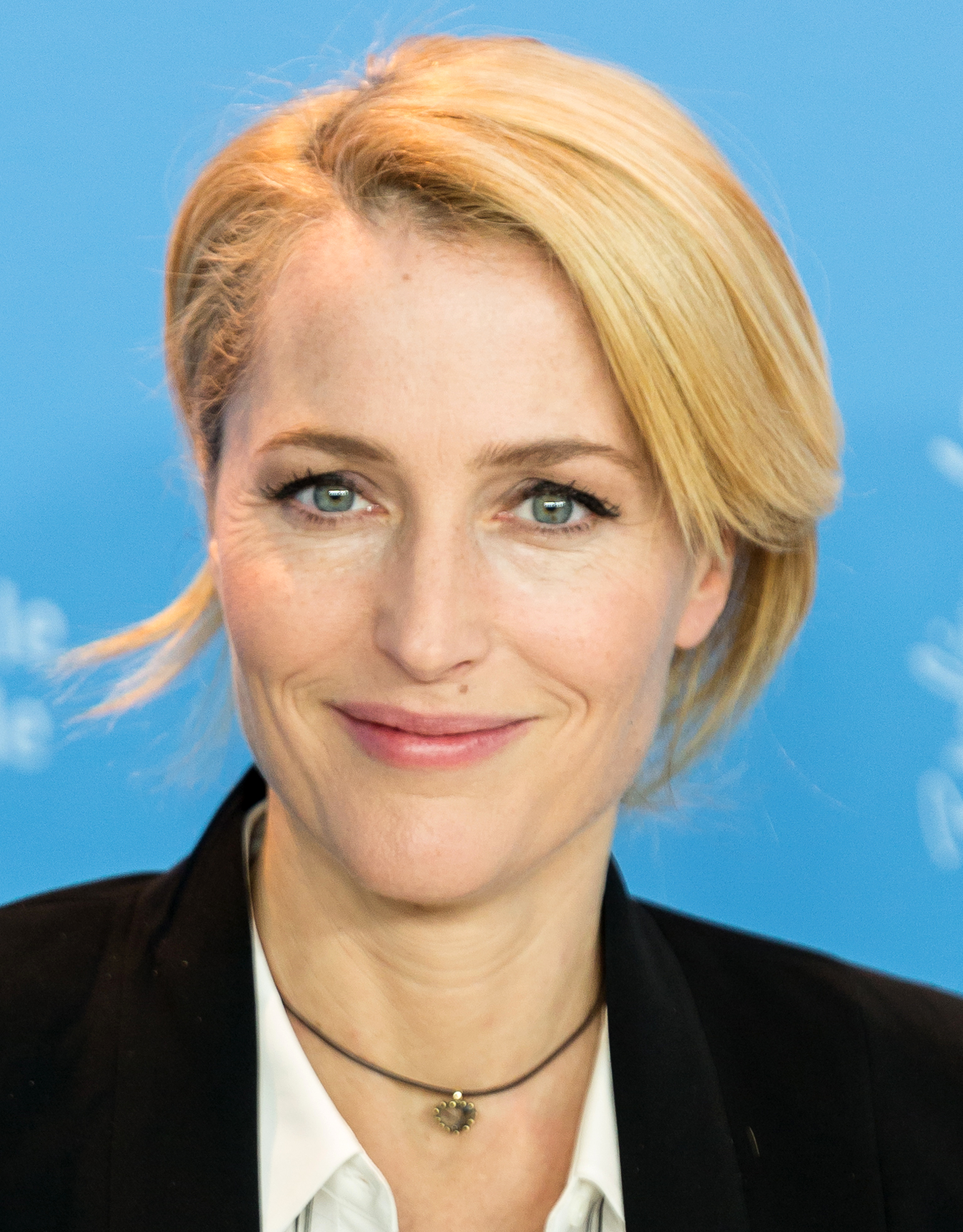
Anderson at the 2017 Berlin Film Festival
Award	Wins	Nominations
BAFTA TV Awards	0	2
Golden Globe Awards	2	6
Emmy Awards	2	6
Olivier Awards	0	3
SAG Awards	4	11
Saturn Awards	1	10
Awards won	36
Runner-up	5
Nominations	107

The following is a list of awards and nominations received by Gillian Anderson.

Anderson, who achieved critical acclaim for starring as Dana Scully in The X-Files, is a Primetime Emmy Award winning actress. She won the Primetime Emmy Award for Outstanding Lead Actress in a Drama Series award in 1997. She was nominated another three times for this role. In 2006, She was nominated Outstanding Lead Actress in a Miniseries or a Movie for her portrayal of Lady Dedlock in Bleak House and most recently, won the Outstanding Supporting Actress in a Drama Series for her turn as Margaret Thatcher on The Crown. Anderson won the Golden Globe Award for Best Actress – Television Series Drama in 1997 for her role as FBI Special Agent Dana Scully in The X-Files and again in 2021 for Best Supporting Actress – Series, Miniseries or TV Movie (The Crown). She was nominated another three times for the role and once more in the Best Actress – Miniseries or Television Film for Bleak House. She won three Screen Actors Guild Awards for Outstanding Performance by a Female Actor in a Drama Series (in 1996, 1997 and 2021), one for Outstanding Performance by an Ensemble in a Drama Series (in 2021) and was nominated total of eleven times.

Anderson was nominated for the BAFTA TV Award twice: in 2006, as Best Actress on Television for Bleak House and in 2011, for Best Supporting Actress on Television for her portrayal of Wallis Simpson in Any Human Heart. For her portrayal of Lily Bart in The House of Mirth (2000) Anderson won the British Independent Film Award for Best Actress.

Anderson has also received accolades for her stage performances. She won the Theatre World Award for Best Newcomer for Absent Friends (1991). She was nominated for a Laurence Olivier Award for Best Actress for her performance in Ibsen's A Doll's House (2009). For her portrayal of Blanche DuBois in A Streetcar Named Desire (2014, 2016) she won the Evening Standard Theatre Award for Best Actress and earned her second Laurence Olivier Award nomination for Best Actress. In 2019, she received her third Laurence Olivier Award nomination for portraying Margo Channing in the stage production of All About Eve.

In 2016, Anderson was appointed an honorary Officer of the Most Excellent Order of the British Empire (OBE) for her services to drama. In 2018, she received a star on the Hollywood Walk of Fame.

== Motion picture awards ==
=== Blockbuster Entertainment Awards ===
Year	Nominated work	Category	Result
1999	The X-Files: Fight the Future	Favorite Actress – Sci-Fi Film	Won

=== British Independent Film Awards ===
Year	Nominated work	Category	Result
2000	The House of Mirth	Best Actress	Won

=== Chlotrudis Awards ===
Year	Nominated work	Category	Result
2002	The House of Mirth	Best Actress	Nominated
2002	The House of Mirth	Audience Best Actress Award	Won

=== Irish Film and Television Awards ===
Year	Nominated work	Category	Result
2005	The Mighty Celt	Best International Actress	Won

=== Satellite Awards ===
Year	Nominated work	Category	Result
2000	The House of Mirth	Best Actress – Motion Picture Drama	Nominated

=== Saturn Awards ===
Year	Nominated work	Category	Result
1998	The X-Files: Fight the Future	Best Actress	Nominated

== Television awards ==
=== Aftonbladet TV Prize ===
Year	Nominated work	Category	Result
1996	The X-Files	Best Foreign TV Personality - Female (Bästa utländska kvinna)	Won
1997	The X-Files	Best Foreign TV Personality - Female (Bästa utländska kvinna)	Won

=== BAFTA TV Awards ===
Year	Nominated work	Category	Result
2006	Bleak House	Best Actress on Television	Nominated
2011	Any Human Heart	Best Supporting Actress on Television	Nominated

=== Bravo Otto ===
Year	Nominated work	Category	Result
1996	The X-Files	Best Female TV Star	Won
1997	The X-Files	Best Female TV Star	Won
1998	The X-Files	Best Female TV Star	Won
1999	The X-Files	Best Female TV Star	Runner-up
2000	The X-Files	Best Female TV Star	Third place

=== Broadcasting Press Guild Awards ===
Year	Nominated work	Category	Result
2006	Bleak House	Best Actress	Won
2012	The Crimson Petal and the White	Best Actress	Nominated
2012	Great Expectations	Best Actress	Nominated
2014	The Fall	Best Actress	Nominated

=== C21 International Drama Awards ===
Year	Nominated work	Category	Result
2015	The Fall	Best Female Performance	Nominated

=== Crime Thriller Awards ===
Year	Nominated work	Category	Result
2013	The Fall	Best Actress Dagger	Nominated

=== Fangoria Chainsaw Awards ===
Year	Nominated work	Category	Result
2015	Hannibal	Favorite Supporting Actress on Television	Won
2016	Hannibal	Favorite Supporting Actress on Television	Won

=== Golden Globe Awards ===
Year	Nominated work	Category	Result
1996	The X-Files	Best Actress – Television Series Drama	Nominated
1997	The X-Files	Best Actress – Television Series Drama	Won
1998	The X-Files	Best Actress – Television Series Drama	Nominated
1999	The X-Files	Best Actress – Television Series Drama	Nominated
2007	Bleak House	Best Actress – Miniseries or Television Film	Nominated
2021	The Crown	Best Supporting Actress – Series, Miniseries or TV Movie	Won

=== Golden Nymph Awards ===
Year	Nominated work	Category	Result
2015	The Fall	Outstanding Actress	Nominated

=== Kids' Choice Awards ===
Year	Nominated work	Category	Result
2000	The X-Files	Favorite Television Friends (shared with David Duchovny)	Nominated

=== National Television Awards ===
Year	Nominated work	Category	Result
1996	The X-Files	Most Popular Actress	Nominated
1997	The X-Files	Most Popular Actress	Nominated

=== Pan-American Association of Film & Television Journalists Awards ===
Year	Nominated work	Category	Result
2012	Great Expectations	Best Supporting actress in a Miniseries or TV Movie	Nominated

=== People's Choice Awards ===
Year	Nominated work	Category	Result
1995	The X-Files	Favorite Female Television Performer	Nominated
1996	The X-Files	Favorite Female Television Performer	Nominated
1997	The X-Files	Favorite Female Television Performer	Nominated
1998	The X-Files	Favorite Female Television Performer	Nominated
1999	The X-Files	Favorite Female Television Performer	Nominated

=== Primetime Emmy Awards ===
Year	Nominated work	Category	Result
1996	The X-Files	Outstanding Lead Actress in a Drama Series	Nominated
1997	The X-Files	Outstanding Lead Actress in a Drama Series	Won
1998	The X-Files	Outstanding Lead Actress in a Drama Series	Nominated
1999	The X-Files	Outstanding Lead Actress in a Drama Series	Nominated
2006	Bleak House	Outstanding Lead Actress in a Miniseries or a Movie	Nominated
2021	The Crown	Outstanding Supporting Actress in a Drama Series	Won

=== Roma Fiction Fest's Artistic Excellence Award ===
Year	Nominated work	Category	Result
2012	Great Expectations	Artistic Excellence Award	Won

=== Satellite Awards ===
Year	Nominated work	Category	Result
1997	The X-Files	Best Actress – Television Series Drama	Nominated
1998	The X-Files	Best Actress – Television Series Drama	Nominated
1999	The X-Files	Best Actress – Television Series Drama	Nominated
2001	The X-Files	Best Actress – Television Series Drama	Nominated
2006	Bleak House	Best Actress – Miniseries or Television Film	Nominated
2012	Great Expectations	Best Actress – Miniseries or Television Film	Nominated
2015	The Fall	Best Actress – Television Series Drama	Nominated
2020	The Crown	Best Supporting Actress – Series, Miniseries or Television Film	Nominated

=== Saturn Awards ===
Year	Nominated work	Category	Result
1996	The X-Files	Best Actress on Television	Won
1997	The X-Files	Best Actress on Television	Nominated
1998	The X-Files	Best Actress on Television	Nominated
1999	The X-Files	Best Actress on Television	Nominated
2000	The X-Files	Best Actress on Television	Nominated
2001	The X-Files	Best Actress on Television	Nominated
2015	The X-Files	Best Actress on Television	Nominated
2015	Hannibal	Best Supporting Actress on Television	Nominated
2018	The X-Files	Best Actress on Television	Nominated

=== Sci-Fi Universe Awards ===
Year	Nominated work	Category	Result
1995	The X-Files	Universe Reader's Choice Award - Best Actress in a Genre TV Series	Won

=== Screen Actors Guild Awards ===
Year	Nominated work	Category	Result
1996	The X-Files	Outstanding Female Actor in a Drama Series	Won
1997	The X-Files	Outstanding Female Actor in a Drama Series	Won
1997	The X-Files	Outstanding Ensemble in a Drama Series	Nominated
1998	The X-Files	Outstanding Ensemble in a Drama Series	Nominated
1998	The X-Files	Outstanding Female Actor in a Drama Series	Nominated
1999	The X-Files	Outstanding Female Actor in a Drama Series	Nominated
1999	The X-Files	Outstanding Ensemble in a Drama Series	Nominated
2000	The X-Files	Outstanding Female Actor in a Drama Series	Nominated
2001	The X-Files	Outstanding Female Actor in a Drama Series	Nominated
2021	The Crown	Outstanding Female Actor in a Drama Series	Won
2021	The Crown	Outstanding Ensemble in a Drama Series	Won

=== SFX Awards ===
Year	Nominated work	Category	Result
1997	The X-Files	Best SF/Fantasy Actress	Won

=== Sichuan TV Festival – International Gold Panda Awards for TV Drama ===
Year	Nominated work	Category	Result
2015	The Fall	Best Actress	Nominated

=== TV Guide Awards ===
Year	Nominated work	Category	Result
1999	The X-Files	Favorite Actress in a Drama	Nominated
2000	The X-Files	Favorite Actress in a Drama	Nominated

=== Viewers for Quality Television Awards ===
Year	Nominated work	Category	Result
1994	The X-Files	Best Actress in a Quality Drama Series	Nominated
1995	The X-Files	Best Actress in a Quality Drama Series	Nominated
1996	The X-Files	Best Actress in a Quality Drama Series	Nominated
1997	The X-Files	Best Actress in a Quality Drama Series	Nominated
1998	The X-Files	Best Actress in a Quality Drama Series	Won
1999	The X-Files	Best Actress in a Quality Drama Series	Won

== Critic awards ==
=== Critics' Choice Television Awards ===
Year	Nominated work	Category	Result
2012	Great Expectations	Best Actress in a Movie/Miniseries	Nominated
2018	American Gods	Best Supporting Actress in a Drama Series	Nominated
2021	The Crown	Best Supporting Actress in a Drama Series	Won

=== London Critics Circle Film Awards ===
Year	Nominated work	Category	Result
2000	The House of Mirth	Actress of the Year	Nominated

=== National Society of Film Critics Awards ===
Year	Nominated work	Category	Result
2000	The House of Mirth	Best Actress	Runner-up

=== New York Film Critics Circle Awards ===
Year	Nominated work	Category	Result
2000	The House of Mirth	Best Actress	Runner-up

=== Television Critics Association Awards ===
Year	Nominated work	Category	Result
1997	The X-Files	Individual Achievement in Drama	Nominated

=== Toronto Film Critics Association Awards ===
Year	Nominated work	Category	Result
2001	The House of Mirth	Best Actress	Runner-up

=== Village Voice Film Poll Awards ===
Year	Nominated work	Category	Result
2000	The House of Mirth	Best Lead Performance	Won

== Theatre Awards ==
=== Broadway World: UK Awards ===
Year	Nominated work	Category	Result
2014	A Streetcar Named Desire	Best Leading Actress in a New Production of a Play (Tied with Anna Madeley)	Won

=== Evening Standard Theatre Awards ===
Year	Nominated work	Category	Result
2014	A Streetcar Named Desire	The Natasha Richardson Award for Best Actress	Won

=== Laurence Olivier Awards ===
Year	Nominated work	Category	Result
2010	A Doll's House	Best Actress	Nominated
2015	A Streetcar Named Desire	Best Actress	Nominated
2019	All About Eve	Best Actress	Nominated

=== Theatre World Awards ===
Year	Nominated work	Category	Result
1990-1991	Absent Friends	Newcomer	Won

=== WhatsonStage.com Awards ===
Year	Nominated work	Category	Result
2003	What the Night is For	Best Actress in a Play	Won
2015	A Streetcar Named Desire	Best Actress in a Play	Runner-up

== Special awards ==
=== Audie Awards ===
Year	Nominated work	Category	Result
2010	Nelson Mandela's Favorite African Folktales	Audiobook of the Year	Won
2010	Nelson Mandela's Favorite African Folktales	Multi-Voiced Performance	Won

=== Harper's Bazaar Women of the Year Awards ===
Year	Nominated work	Category	Result
2013	The Fall	Television Icon	Won
2016	The Fall	Television Icon	Won

=== Glamour Awards ===
Year	Nominated work	Category	Result
2015	A Streetcar Named Desire	Theatre Actress of the Year	Won
2016	The X-Files	International TV Actress	Nominated
2017	The Fall	International TV Actress	Nominated

=== Webby Awards ===
Year	Nominated work	Category	Result
2017	The Fall	Best Actress	Won

== Film festival awards ==
=== Filmfest München ===
Year	Award	Work	Result	Ref.
2025	CineMerit Award	For her outstanding contributions to the art of film	Honored	
