= Lisa Kristine =

American photographer, activist, and speaker

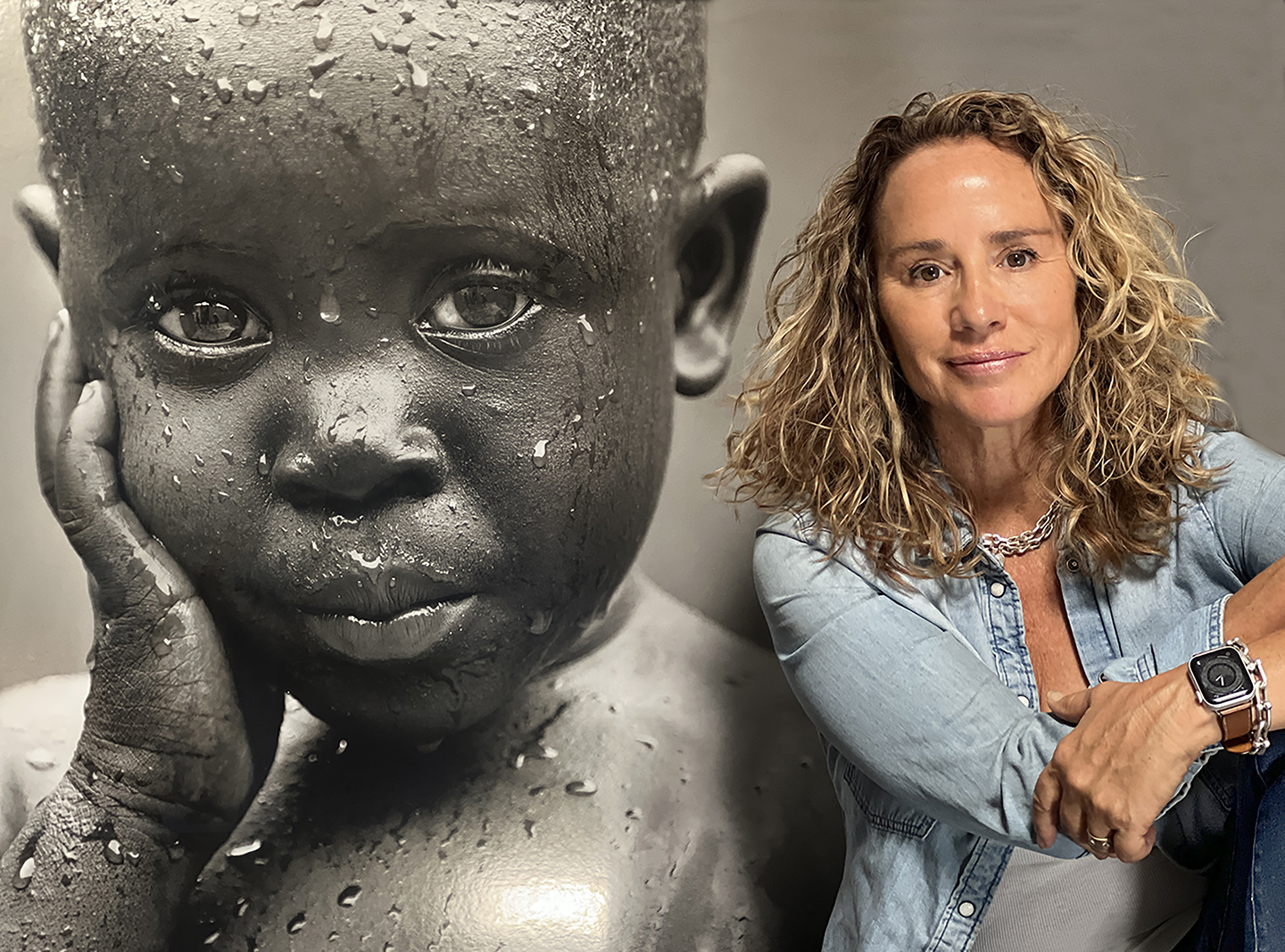
Kristine with her portrait of Kofi in 2022.

Lisa Kristine (born September 2, 1965) is an American humanitarian photographer, activist, and speaker. For more than four decades, her photography has documented indigenous cultures and social causes, such as modern slavery, in more than 150 countries. Through her work, Kristine has supported charities and humanitarian organizations. She is a member of the Explorer's Club.

Kristine has published six books and has been the subject of four documentaries. Kristine is the recipient of the 2013 Lucie Humanitarian Award. In 2017, she founded Human Thread Foundation to promote human dignity through educating the public and driving awareness about social causes. In 2019, her exhibition on human trafficking was inaugurated by Pope Francis at the Vatican.

== Early life and education ==
Kristine began learning photography at age 11. She was inspired as a child while looking at images of indigenous people in her mother's anthropology.

She graduated at 18 from the Fashion Institute of Design & Merchandising in San Francisco and immediately left for Europe. Although the two-year Fashion Institute program had taught her a lot about color, design, and graphics, she says, "I recognized that [fashion] wasn't going to be for me."

== Career in photography ==
She traveled through Europe, North Africa, and Asia making photographs. She especially gravitated to and responded to the bold colors of Asia. Shortly thereafter, she says, her work became more purposeful. She researched ancient cultures, including how they found meaning, whether through conventional religion, philosophy, or animism.

As a professional photographer, Kristine began traveling internationally in the early 1980s. She has visited countries on six continents and is focused on topics related to human rights and, in particular, modern slavery. Kristine is known to spend months connecting with her subjects by traveling with a translator to ensure the subjects' permission before documenting them on film.

Her TED talk, "Photos that bear witness to modern slavery", has been viewed millions of times and focused on issues of forced labor and human trafficking.

A film that featured her work on slavery, Sold (2014), directed by Jeffrey D. Brown and Emma Thompson includes a character inspired by Kristine and is portrayed by Gillian Anderson.

In 2009, she collaborated with Free the Slaves on a body of work about human enslavement, published as Slavery (2010).

Kristine has been an active voice on issues related to modern slavery, human trafficking, and labor rights, speaking at events hosted by the Thomson Reuters Foundation, including the Trust Women Conference and the Anti-Slavery Summit. She has also contributed reporting and commentary to the CNN Freedom Project, covering topics such as child labor in Ghana and supply chain challenges across South Asia and West Africa.

In addition, she has been involved in initiatives and exhibitions focused on improving labor conditions within global supply chains, including collaborations with Hewlett Packard Enterprise and participation in international forums addressing responsible business practices and workers’ rights.

=== Educating ===
When the State of the World Forum convened in San Francisco in 1999, Kristine presented her work to help inspire discussions on human rights, social change, and global security. In 2017, Kristine founded Human Thread Foundation to promote human dignity through educating the public and driving awareness about social causes. In 2018 Kristine's work inspired a worksheet for 7th to 10th graders for world history, civics and visual arts through Literacy & Empathy: Learning Activity for Ted Talks on Modern-Day slavery resulted in a worksheet created and designed with literacy strategies for understanding slavery through Kristine's TEDx talk.

== Exhibitions ==
Kristine was the sole exhibitor at the 2009 Vancouver Peace Summit.

In February 2017, Kristine's exhibition entitled Modern Slavery was presented at Kogart House Museum in Budapest, Hungary. The First Lady, Anita Herczegh, wife of President János Áder, the main patron of the exhibition, took part in the opening of the exhibition, which was open for two months.

The National Underground Railroad Freedom Center announced the opening of Enslaved: A Visual Story of Modern Day Slavery on Saturday in 2016. The exhibit featured images by Kristine that not only document the lives endured by slaves but also their freedom. In 2017, EnSlaved was shown at the Smithsonian Affiliate's, National Civil Rights Museum in Memphis.

On May 10, 2019, Pope Francis officially blessed and inaugurated Kristine's exhibition, Nuns Healing Hearts, at the Vatican. The exhibition focused on the Talitha Kum nuns who combat human trafficking around the world. The images were taken in more than six countries and were a culmination of a nearly two-year project. In 2019, Kristine's exhibition launched at the United Nations in New York City. The exhibition was opened by Princess Takamado of the Japanese Imperial Family that same year at the Mitsubishi Gallery in Japan.

In March 2022, Kristine's exhibition Nuns Healing Hearts was presented at the MAXXI Museum in Rome. In 2024, her exhibition With Every Fiber opened at Grace Farms in New Canaan, Connecticut, examining forced labor in global building-material supply chains. In October 2025, she presented an exhibition at the Palace of the Parliament in Bucharest in connection with EU Anti-Trafficking Day and addressed members of the Romanian Parliament.

== Reception ==
Her work has been endorsed by Archbishop Desmond Tutu, the Queen Mother of Bhutan, and Amnesty International. Her work was auctioned by Christie's New York and sponsored by the United Nations to benefit Kofi Annan's Ambassador's Ball.

== Publications ==
- A Human Thread. San Francisco: Migration, 2002
- This Moment. San Francisco: Migration, 2002
- Callahan, Peggy (2010). Slavery. Washington, DC: Free the Slaves. ISBN 978-0-615-40323-6. With a foreword by Archbishop Desmond Tutu.
- Kristine, Lisa (12 September 2017). Intimate Expanse. San Francisco: Migration. ISBN 978-0-9839205-1-9.
- Kristine, Lisa (9 October 2017). One Breath. San Francisco: Migration. ISBN 978-0-9839-205-2-6.
- Bound to Freedom: Slavery to Liberation. Goff. (2017) ISBN 1935935089. With a foreword by Pope Francis.

== Films ==
- A Human Thread (2003) – documentary on Kristine, produced by MediaStorm. DVD.
- Through the Lens (2007) – documentary on Kristine, produced by MediaStorm. DVD.
- In Plain Sight (2015) – documentary, produced by Pivotal Eye
- #standwithme – documentary, produced by Stillmotion
- Sold (2014) – feature film, produced by Jane Charles, directed by Jeffrey D. Brown

== Awards ==
- 2013: Lucie Humanitarian Award presented at Carnegie Hall.
- Global Sustainability Hero Award presented at the Dubai World Expo
- 2016: National Underground Railroad Freedom Center received an award for best exhibit from the Ohio Museums Association, in showing Kristine's Enslaved exhibition.
- 2022: IUTP (International Understanding Through Photography) award from the Photographic Society of America, for significant contributions to the advancement of understanding among people and its unique impact on the world through photography
- EPIC Artist Award (2024): The EPIC Impact Society presented Lisa Kristine with the Artist Award during the EPIC Summit 2024, recognizing her significant contributions to humanitarian photography and her efforts in inspiring positive transformation within communities.
- Lisa Kristine was awarded the International Visionary Award in 2013: The WIFTS Foundation International Visionary Awards honors women from all walks of life who continue to “raise the bar” in their respective fields and brings them together through the Art Form of Film and Television, the 21st century visual Communicator.
