= Last Act =

Last Act may refer to:

== Film and television ==
- The Last Act (film), a 2012 Indian Hindi-language anthology film written by Anurag Kashyap
- The Last Act, a film by Varuzh Karim-Masihi
- "Last Act", an episode of the Canadian television series Forever Knight
- "The Last Act", an episode of the historical drama television series Vikings
- The Amazing Digital Circus: The Last Act, a theatrical release of the eight and ninth episodes of the Australian animated web series The Amazing Digital Circus

== Literature ==
- "The Last Act", a 1966 short story by Roald Dahl
- Last Act, a young adult novel by Christopher Pike
- The last part (or act) of a story structure
  - In particular, the last act in a work of theatre
