= Sold (2014 film) =

- Theatrical release poster
- Directed by: Jeffrey D. Brown
- Written by: Joseph Kwong
- Based on: Sold by Patricia McCormick
- Produced by: Jane Charles
- Starring: David Arquette; Gillian Anderson; Seema Biswas; Sushmita Mukherjee; Niyar Saikia; Tillotama Shome; Priyanka Bose; Parambrata Chatterjee
- Cinematography: Seamus Tierney; Jehangir Choudhary
- Music by: John McDowell
- Release date: March 7, 2014
- Running time: 97 minutes
- Country: United States
- Language: English

Sold is a 2014 American drama film directed by Jeffrey D. Brown based on Patricia McCormick's novel Sold.

The film is executive produced by Emma Thompson and produced by Jane Charles. The script was written by Joseph Kwong and Jeffrey D. Brown.

== Plot ==
Lakshmi, a young girl, lives in a mountain side village in rural Nepal with her mother and disabled, unemployed father. She wishes to work and save enough money to buy a tin roof for the house, while her mother encourages her to finish her schooling. A period of heavy rain causes the rice fields to become swamped and damages all remaining crops, leaving the family without a source of income. While attending a village festival, Lakshmi meets Bimla, a foreign woman who entices her with stories of the city and offers her a job in India as a maid. Lakshmi's mother rejects the proposal, but her father reveals that he has already agreed and accepted money from Bimla, out of desperation.

Lakshmi and Bimla pass the border without incident and arrive at their destination, a building known as 'Happiness House', which is a brothel run by a woman named Mumtaz. Unaware that she has been sold into sexual slavery, Lakshmi mingles with the other girls at the brothel, including Shahanna and Anita, who she befriends; and the temperamental Monica. Later that night, she is dressed and prepared for Varun, an important and high-paying customer who has a preference for virgins. Resisting his advances, Lakshmi bites Varun and uses the ensuing chaos to escape the building. On the street, she blindly runs for help but is caught and beaten by Mumtaz's workers, who subsequently lock her in an isolated room. While looking out of the window, Lakshmi is spotted by Sophia, an American photographer who has arrived in India to work with an anti-trafficking organisation, Hope House. Sophia takes pictures of Lakshmi, but she is noticed by a brothel worker, Suren, who breaks her camera. After recovering the photos, Sophia becomes determined to save 'the girl in the window', and requests help from Hope House manager Mrs. Tripathi, and her investigators Vikram and Sam.

After multiple failed attempts to ensure her cooperation, Mumtaz drugs Lakshmi's mango juice and prepares her once again for Varun, who rapes her. The next day, she is drugged again and forced to service multiple men. Sophia asks Vikram to raid Happiness House, but he is reluctant to do so without proper planning. No longer new, Lakshmi is given a bed in the communal living space and made to work as the other women do. She befriends Harish, a young boy living at the brothel with his infant sister Gina and mother Pushpa, who is a sickly prostitute. After witnessing workers bury a body in a shallow grave, Lakshmi contemplates suicide but is stopped by Shahanna. Days pass and soon Lakshmi becomes resigned to her fate. She calculates the number of days needed for her to pay off her debt to Mumtaz, but is discouraged by Shahanna, who warns her that there will be consequences if her notes are found. Anita tries to escape, and is punished by Mumtaz, who shoves chilli peppers into her vagina in front of the others. Lakshmi saves Shahanna after she is attacked by an irate customer, and Bimla informs her that the bodies of those who die on the premises are buried in the garden. Monica, who has managed to pay back her debt to Mumtaz after five years, leaves the brothel and returns to her village, where she expects to be welcomed as a heroine since she has been financially providing for her family. Vikram and Sam arrive at Happiness House, posing as customers. Sam gives Lakshmi a card containing the details of Hope House and informs her that a raid will be held soon. The exchange is overheard by Anita. Lakshmi confides in Shahanna, who is dismissive and claims that American men are sent to kidnap girls and harvest their organs. A bruised and battered Monica returns to Happiness House, having been beaten by her father and thrown out of her village. A week later, the women are taken to see a doctor, who examines them and discovers that Monica has Kaposi's sarcoma, a symptom of HIV/AIDS. She is forced to leave the brothel.

While delivering soft drinks to customers, Harish sees Lakshmi in the garden and offers her a bottle. They hide from Suren, who comes looking for Harish and the missing crate of drinks. Anita witnesses the scene and causes a power outage, which stops the pair being found and punished. Mumtaz confronts the women about the power cut, and finds the Hope House card. Anita falsely claims it is hers and is struck by Mumtaz, but she is able to return the card to Lakshmi and tells her that she lied to buy time for the upcoming raid. The raid begins but the police and Sam find nothing since the younger girls are hidden away by Bimla. Sophia apologizes to Vikram for pushing him to conduct a premature search. Anita is sold by Mumtaz to the Middle East, where she will be a sex slave and never be able to return. Pushpa becomes increasingly sick and is forced to leave with Harish and Gina, since she can no longer work. Lakshmi begins to plan her escape, and manages to slip out of a window while the others are watching a religious festival on TV. She is chased by one of the brothel workers but manages to escape in the thick crowds of worshipers. After initially getting lost, Lakshmi finally makes her way to Hope House and is reunited with Harish. Using her information, the police conduct a surprise raid on Happiness House, and find the hidden girls and buried bodies. Bimla, Suren and others are arrested, but Mumtaz gets away. Later that night, the rescued girls burn their working clothes at Hope House.

== Cast ==
- Niyar Saikia – Lakshmi
- Gillian Anderson – Sophia; based on the humanitarian photographer Lisa Kristine.
- David Arquette – Sam
- Seema Biswas – Amma
- Sushmita Mukherjee – Mumtaz
- Parambrata Chatterjee – Vikram
- Ankur Vikal – Varun
- Neerja Naik – Anita
- Priyanka Bose – Monica
- Tillotama Shome – Bimla
- Madan Krishna Shrestha – Ganesh, Lakshmi's father
- Seirah Royin – Mrs. Tripathi
- Ridhima Debnath – orphan child

== Reception ==
‘Sold’, is a must watch film which raises a clarion call for action. If it saves girls from being sold into sexual slavery, it will go down in the annals of cinematic history as a film which made a mighty difference.

— The American Bazaar

== Awards ==
Awards
Year	Award	Category	Recipients and nominees	Result
2014	London Indian Film Festival	Pure Heaven Audience Award	Jeffrey D. Brown and Jane Charles	Won
2014	Albuquerque Film and Media Experience	Best Narrative Feature	Jeffery D. Brown and Jane Charles	Won
2014	River to River. Florence Indian Film Festival	Audience Award	Jeffery D. Brown and Jane Charles	Won
2015	Sonoma International Film Festival	World Cinema Audience Award	Jeffrey D. Brown and Jane Charles	Won
2016	Washington DC South Asian Film Festival	Best Picture	Jeffery D. Brown and Jane Charles	Won
