= The EarthEnd Saga =

Novel series by Gillian Anderson and Jeff Rovin

- A Vision of Fire (2014); A Dream of Ice (2015); The Sound of Seas (2016)
- Author: by Gillian Anderson, Jeff Rovin
- Country: United States
- Language: English
- Genre: Drama, thriller, science fiction, mystery
- Publisher: Simon & Schuster
- Published: October 7, 2014 – September 13, 2016
- Media type: Print (hardback & paperback); Audiobook; E-book; Compact disk
- No. of books: 3

The EarthEnd Saga is a science fiction novel series co-written by actress Gillian Anderson and writer Jeff Rovin.

The first book, A Vision of Fire, was first released in October 2014. A Dream of Ice was published a little more than one year later, in December 2015. The third book of the novel series is titled The Sound of Seas and was published in September 2016. The series been translated into Finnish, French, Portuguese, and Polish.

== Premise ==
Child psychologist Caitlin O'Hara investigates a series of strangely behaving young people all around the world, which causes Caitlin to think that there's an unexplained force at work. She does her best to uncover the supernatural links between these seemingly unrelated cases in order to not only save her patient, Maanik, but perhaps the whole world from disaster.

== Characters ==
- Caitlin O'Hara, M.D., Ph.D.: A 39-year-old renowned child psychologist, and a single mother to her child, Jacob. She lives in Manhattan and has a younger sister, Abby, who is a Surgeon in Santa Monica, California.
- Maanik Pawar: A precocious, extroverted 16-year-old and daughter of Ganak Pawar, the Indian Ambassador to the United Nations. After being caught up in an attempted assassination, Maanik experiences visions, makes unique gestures using her body and speaking incoherent words.
- Benjamin 'Ben' Moss: A translator at the United Nations Headquarters and a close friend of Caitlin's. Ben and Caitlin met while studying at New York University.
- Jacob O'Hara: Caitlin's 10-year-old deaf child. He uses hearing aids and communicates using a mixture of sign language and speaking.
- Hansa Pawar: Maanik's mother and Ganak's wife.
- Andrew 'Andy' Thwaite: An Australian sociologist and Jacob's father. He was divorced with three kids when he met Caitlin in Thailand during the 2004 Tsunami Relief Efforts. He has weekly video chats with Jacob.
- Gaelle Anglade: A Haitian woman, living in Jacmel, who contributes to a literacy and numeracy programme for women in Port-au-Prince and is studying to become a nurse. She experiences an incident where she presents symptoms similar to Maanik's condition.
- Joseph Patrick O'Hara: Caitlin's father.
- Aaron Basher: A doctor from West Orange, New Jersey, who has resided in Port-au-Prince for five years, since the 2010 Haiti Earthquake and helps Caitlin investigate the cause of Gaelle's incident.

== List of novels ==
Title	Publication date	Length	ISBN
A Vision of Fire	October 7, 2014	304 pp (first edition)	978-1476776538
A Dream of Ice	December 8, 2015	304 pp (first edition)	978-1476776552
A Sound of Seas	September 13, 2016	304 pp (first edition)	978-1476776590

== Adaptation ==
In May 2016, Anderson announced that the book series was sold to be made into a TV series.
