= Clyde Klotz =

Canadian art director

- Born: Errol Clyde Klotz; June 8, 1961 (age 64); Canada
- Other names: Errol Klotz
- Occupations: Art director, production designer
- Spouse: Gillian Anderson (m. 1994; div. 1997)
- Children: 1

Errol Clyde Klotz (born June 8, 1961) is a Canadian television art director and production designer. He worked as an assistant art director on several TV series filmed in Vancouver, such as The Hitchhiker, 21 Jump Street and The X-Files, and as an illustrator on the films This Boy's Life and Look Who's Talking Too.

He subsequently worked as a production designer for Rainmaker Animation on the animated series ReBoot and on The Transformers spin-off Beast Wars.

== Awards and nominations ==
Klotz was nominated for a Genie Award in 1996 for Achievement in Art Direction/Production Design on the film Magic in the Water. His work on Beast Wars won him a Daytime Emmy Award for Outstanding Achievement in Animation in 1998.

== Personal life ==
On January 1, 1994, Klotz married actress Gillian Anderson, who played Dana Scully on The X-Files, where they met on the set. They have one daughter (b. September 25, 1994). The couple divorced in 1997.
