= Cut (novel) =

2000 novel by Patricia McCormick

- First edition
- Author: Patricia McCormick
- Original title: Cut
- Language: English
- Genre: Young adult novel
- Publisher: Scholastic
- Publication date: October 2000
- Publication place: United States
- Media type: Print (hardback & paperback)
- Pages: 151 pgs
- ISBN: 1-886910-61-8
- OCLC: 44721025
- LC Class: PZ7.M13679 Cu 2000

Cut is a 2000 novel by Patricia McCormick, targeted at young adults. In 2002 it was named one of the ALA's "Best Books for Young Adults" for that year.

== Plot ==
Fifteen-year-old Callie McPherson of Mississauga isn't speaking to anybody, not even to her therapist at Sea Pines (nicknamed "Sick Minds"), the residential treatment facility where her parents and doctor sent her after discovering that she self-harms. At some point, Callie does begin speaking to her therapist/doctor, and she helps Callie understand why she self-harms. As her story unfolds, Callie reluctantly becomes involved with the other "guests" at Sea Pines—finding her voice and confronting the trauma that triggered her behavior. Callie gets better with the help of Sydney (her roommate), Debbie, Becca, Tara, Amanda, and Tiffany. Through support from her family, guests, and therapist she soon learns why she cuts herself.

== Reception ==
Critical reception for Cut was overwhelmingly positive, with Kirkus Reviews calling the book "a thoughtful look at teenage mental illness and recovery". Booklist praised McCormick's depiction of Callie, saying that she was an "exceptional character study". Publishers Weekly positively reviewed both the paperback and audio versions, writing that the book "sympathetically and authentically renders the difficulties of giving voice to a very real sense of harm and powerlessness" as well as praising Clea Lewis for her narration.

=== Awards ===
Cut received the following accolades:

- Lincoln Award Nominee (2005)
- Selected Audiobooks for Young Adults (2002)
- Best Books for Young Adults (2002)
- Audiobooks for Young Adults (2002)
- Quick Picks for Reluctant Young Adult Readers (2001)

=== Challenges ===
Despite the above, Cut has frequently been challenged in the United States. According to the American Library Association, the book was the 86th most banned and challenged book in the United States between 2000 and 2009 (86).
