= The Mighty Celt =

- Promotional theatre poster
- Directed by: Pearse Elliot
- Produced by: Robert Walpole, Paddy McDonald, Paddy Breathnach
- Starring: Gillian Anderson; Tyrone McKenna; Robert Carlyle; Ken Stott; Seán McGinley
- Edited by: Dermot Diskin
- Music by: Adrian Johnston
- Production companies: BBC Films; Irish Film Board; Northern Ireland Film and Television Commission; Green Park Films; Treasure Entertainment
- Release dates: 11 February 2005 (Dublin); 26 August 2005
- Running time: 82 minutes
- Countries: Ireland; United Kingdom
- Language: English

The Mighty Celt is a 2005 Irish-British drama film set in Northern Ireland, written and directed by Pearse Elliott. It stars Gillian Anderson, Robert Carlyle, Sean McGinley, Ken Stott and Tyrone McKenna. It is centred on greyhound racing in a Catholic community after the armed conflict "The Troubles" ended, but where their legacy remains strong. The film was well received in Ireland, with Gillian Anderson receiving an IFTA Award for Best International Actress. The film's title is based on the name of a comic book shown in the movie.

The greyhound scenes were filmed at Ballyskeagh Greyhound track.

== Cast ==
- Robert Carlyle as O
- Gillian Anderson as Kate
- Ken Stott as Good Joe
- Tyrone McKenna as Donal

== Reception ==
On review aggregator website Rotten Tomatoes, the film has a 67% approval rating based on 6 reviews, with an average ranking of 5.7/10.

William Thomas of Empire wrote, "There's promise in the bursts of dark humour, but these are few and far between, only to remind us how much better directors like Ken Loach have dealt with the coming-of-age genre".
