= Sold (McCormick novel) =

2006 novel by Patricia McCormick

- Author: Patricia McCormick
- Original title: Nepal
- Cover artist: Bryn Bernard
- Genre: Realistic Fiction
- Publisher: Hyperion
- Publication date: 2006
- Media type: Print (Hardcover and Paperback)
- Pages: 262
- ISBN: 0-7868-5171-6
- OCLC: 70710278
- LC Class: PZ7.5.M43 Sol 2006

Sold is a novel by Patricia McCormick, published in 2006. It tells the story of a girl from Nepal named Lakshmi, who is sold into sexual slavery in India. The novel is written in a series of short, vignette-style chapters, from the point of view of the main character. The 2014 movie Sold by Oscar-winning director Jeffrey D. Brown is based on the same novel.

== Plot ==
Lakshmi is a thirteen-year-old girl living with her family in a small hut in the mountains of Nepal. Her family is desperately poor, but her life is full of simple pleasures, like raising her black-and-white speckled goat, and having her mother brush her hair by the light of an oil lamp. But now the harsh Himalayan monsoons wash away all that remains of the family's crops, Lakshmi's stepfather says she must leave home and take a job to support her family.

He introduces her to a charming stranger who tells her she will find her a job as a maid working for a wealthy woman in the city. Glad to be able to help, Lakshmi undertakes the long journey to India and arrives at “Happiness House” full of hope. But she soon learns the horrible truth: she has been sold into prostitution.

An old woman named Mumtaz rules the brothel with cruelty and cunning. She tells Lakshmi that she is trapped there until she can pay off her family's debt – then cheats Lakshmi of her meager earnings so that she can never leave.

Lakshmi faces difficult circumstances in her new environment. She recalls her mother's advice to endure hardship. Over time, she forms friendships with other girls. She also teaches herself to read and speak English by listening to conversations and reading books.

Eventually, Lakshmi meets an American man, who arrives and disguises himself as a client to gather the evidence he needs to prosecute Mumtaz and her associates. Mumtaz is ultimately arrested, thus freeing Lakshmi and the other girls.

== Reception ==
Sold received positive reviews for exposing readers to an unfamiliar world. Kirkus Reviews, for instance, commented that “McCormick provides readers who live in safety and under protection of the law with a vivid window into a harsh and cruel world.” Booklist agreed, saying Sold is “[a]n unforgettable account of sexual slavery as it exists now.”

In 2025, Sold was the first book on the Most Challenged Books list by the American Library Association's Office for Intellectual Freedom. The ALA received more reports of censorship requests against it than any other book that year.

== Awards and honors ==
- ALA Top 10 Best Book for Young Adults 2007
- National Book Award Finalist 2007
- National Public Radio - Top 100 Books of the Year 2007
- Book Sense Pick 2007
- California Young Reader Medal 2007
- Quill Award 2007
- Gustav-Heinemann-Peace Prize 2008
- Elliot Rosewater Award 2009-2010

== Bibliography ==
McCormick, Patricia. Sold. New York, New York: Hyperion Books for Children, 2008.
