= Jeffrey D. Brown =

American film director

- Born: New York
- Education: New York University
- Occupations: Film director, television director, film producer, screenwriter
- Years active: 1977–present
- Spouse: Jan Brown

Jeffrey D. Brown is an American film and television director, film producer, and screenwriter. He is best known for directing, producing, and writing the short film Molly's Pilgrim, for which he won an Academy Award in 1986 for Best Live Action Short Film.

Brown also has directing credits in other television series, including The Wonder Years, L.A. Law, Hooperman, Freshman Dorm, Baby Boom, and an episode of CBS Schoolbreak Special.

Brown has also produced and co-wrote the films Pontiac Moon (1994), starring Ted Danson and Mary Steenburgen, and Dream with the Fishes (1997), both in collaboration with Finn Taylor. He directed the narrative feature film Sold (2014), based on Patricia McCormick's novel Sold.
