= The Last Act =

Short story by Roald Dahl

- Short story by Roald Dahl
- Country: United Kingdom
- Language: English

Publication
- Published in: Playboy
- Publication type: Magazine
- Publication date: January 1966

"The Last Act" is a 1966 short story by Roald Dahl, described by its author as an attempt to write about "murder by fucking." It was first published in the January 1966 issue of Playboy, having been rejected by The New Yorker because of its disturbing content. It was later included in the collection Switch Bitch, published in 1974 by Michael Joseph Ltd.

== Plot summary ==
Middle-aged New York widow Anna Cooper has been contemplating suicide after losing her beloved husband Ed in a car accident, but begins to feel life may be worth living again after helping out in a friend's adoption agency. While visiting Dallas, Texas alone on agency business, Anna starts to feel uneasy and vulnerable. She remembers that an old flame, Dr. Conrad Kreuger, lives in Dallas, and telephones him from her hotel. Anna and Conrad had been high school sweethearts, but Anna had left Conrad to marry Ed, and Conrad had married another woman soon afterwards. Conrad seems pleased to hear from Anna, and suggests they meet in her hotel's bar for a drink.

When he arrives, Anna learns that Conrad is a gynecologist and is now divorced. While he appears sympathetic when Anna describes her emotional fragility, he reveals he still feels bitter about the way she had jilted him. Nevertheless, Conrad suggests that he and Anna might have "a bit of unfinished business." Anna has drunk several martinis, and lets Conrad take her to her hotel room.

They prepare to make love, but Conrad suddenly becomes aggressive, pinning Anna down on the bed and "diagnosing" her as having menopausal symptoms. When Anna begins screaming, Conrad pushes her to the floor, and she staggers, sobbing, to the bathroom, shutting the door behind her. When Conrad – who has evidently planned revenge on Anna for breaking up with him – hears her open the bathroom cabinet, he quickly dresses and leaves the room (the implication is that Anna will commit suicide by cutting her wrists with a razor blade).

== Reception ==
Dahl's biographer, Jeremy Treglown, states that "The Last Act" is a story that Dahl "would have done better to have scrapped... While the fiction is far from drawing readers into admiring Conrad, and its sympathies remain painfully with Anna, it has no purpose as a mechanism other than to lead to a crudely sensationalist conclusion." Philosophy professor Bert Olivier analysed the story in some depth in his book Philosophy and Communication.
