= Absent Friends (play) =

1974 play by Alan Ayckbourn

Absent Friends is a 1974 play by the British playwright Alan Ayckbourn.

== Plot ==
When Colin, a friend who has been absent, comes back to his circle of friends, his friends are worried about how to approach him over the death of his fiancée, Carol, who has drowned. Diana organizes a tea party for Colin's arrival. The characters are shown to have interrelationship tensions and this is near erupting when Colin arrives, heightening the tension when they all work to appear friendly towards him. However Colin seems euphorically happy while the rest of the party are near breaking point.

Diana is concerned in Act I regarding whether her husband (Paul) is faithful or not. Deep down she knows he is not and has a feeling he is having a love affair with Evelyn. Evelyn's husband John is in business with Paul and knows that Paul and Evelyn have slept together but doesn't say anything in fear of damaging business relations. The play unfolds and Colin's arrival triggers Diana's confrontation. She ends up pouring the cream on Paul and breaking down at the end of the play.
