= Patricia McCormick (author) =

American author and journalist

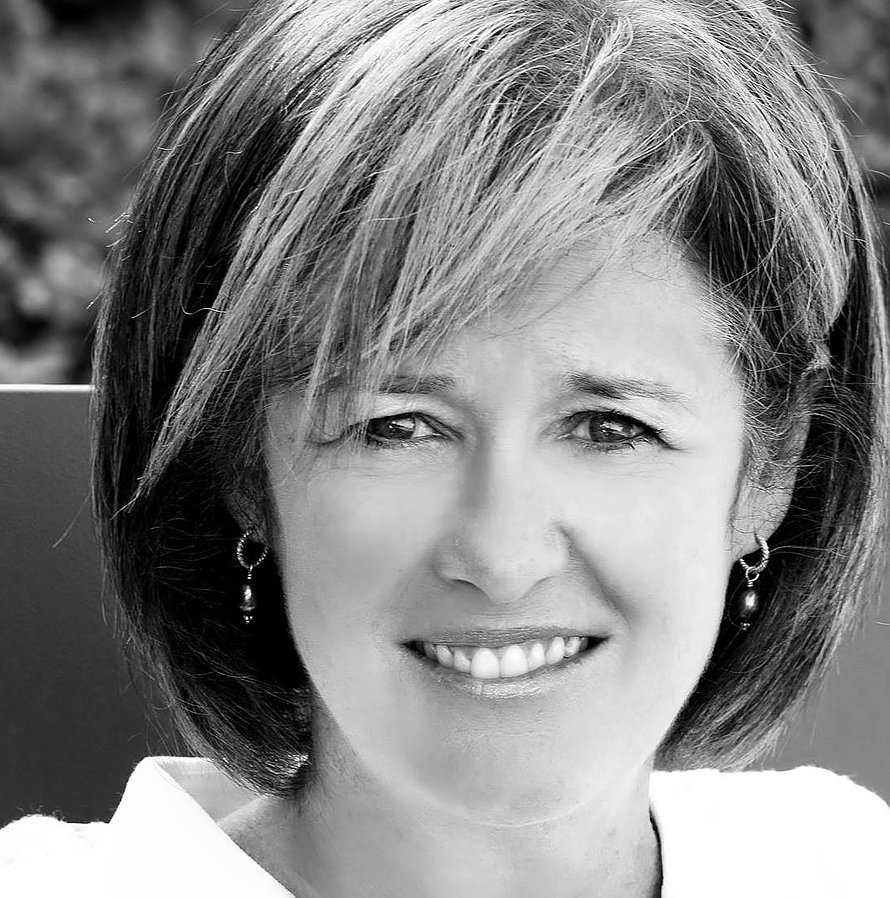
Patricia McCormick

Patricia McCormick (born May 23, 1956) is an American journalist and writer of realistic fiction for young adults. She has twice been a finalist for the National Book Award.

== Career ==
McCormick graduated from Rosemont College in 1974–1978. McCormick earned an MS from the Columbia University Graduate School of Journalism and an MFA from the New School in 1999. She currently lives in New York City. McCormick is a frequent contributor to several magazines and newspapers, including The New York Times, Ladies Home Journal, Town & Country, and Reader's Digest.

Her books rely heavily on research and interviews. To write her novel Sold, McCormick traveled to the brothels of India and the mountain villages of Nepal to interview survivors of sex trafficking. For her book Never Fall Down, she spent a month in Cambodia with a survivor of the Khmer Rouge Genocide.

== Works ==
- Cut - PUSH, Scholastic (2000) 6.9/10
- My Brother's Keeper - Hyperion Books for Children (2005) 7/10
- Sold - Hyperion Books for Children (2006) - National Book Award Finalist 9/10
- Purple Heart - HarperCollins Publishers (2009) 5/10
- Never Fall Down - (2012) - National Book Award finalist 8/10
- The Plot to Kill Hitler: Dietrich Bonhoeffer: Pastor, Spy, Unlikely Hero (2016) 7/10

== Awards, recognition and nominations ==
In 2002 McCormick's Cut was named one of the ALA Best Books for Young Adults for that year. McCormick won an Editor's Choice Award from Booklist and was a National Book Award Finalist in 2006 for her book Sold.

2000

- American Library Association Top Ten Quick Pick 2000
- Children's Literature Council's Choice 2000
- Children's Literature Council's Choice 2000
- Teen People Book-of-the-Month selection 2000
- New York Public Library Best Books for the Teenage 2000

2002

- American Library Association Best Book of the Year 2002

2004, 2006, 2012

- New York Public Library Best Books for the Teenage

2006

- American Library Association, Top Ten List, Best Books of the Year, 2006
- Booklist 2006 Editor's Choice Award
- Book Sense Pick, Winter 2006
- Chicago Public Library Best of the Best List, 2006
- Chicago Tribune Best of the Year, 2006*National Book Award Finalist, 2006
- National Public Radio's Best Books of the Year 2006
- New York Public Library Best Books for the Teenage 2006
- Publishers Weekly, Best 100 Books of 2006

2007

- ALA Best Books for Young Adults, 2007
- Booklist Top Ten Women's History Books for Youth, 2007
- Notable Social Studies Trade Books for Young People, 2007

2008

- Gustav-Heinemann Peace Prize 2008

2009

- IndieBound Pick, Autumn, 2009
- Publishers Weekly, Best 25 Books of 2009

2012

- National Book Award (Young People's Literature), finalist, Never Fall Down
- New York Times Notable
