= Antoine-Athanase Royer-Collard =

French physician and psychiatrist

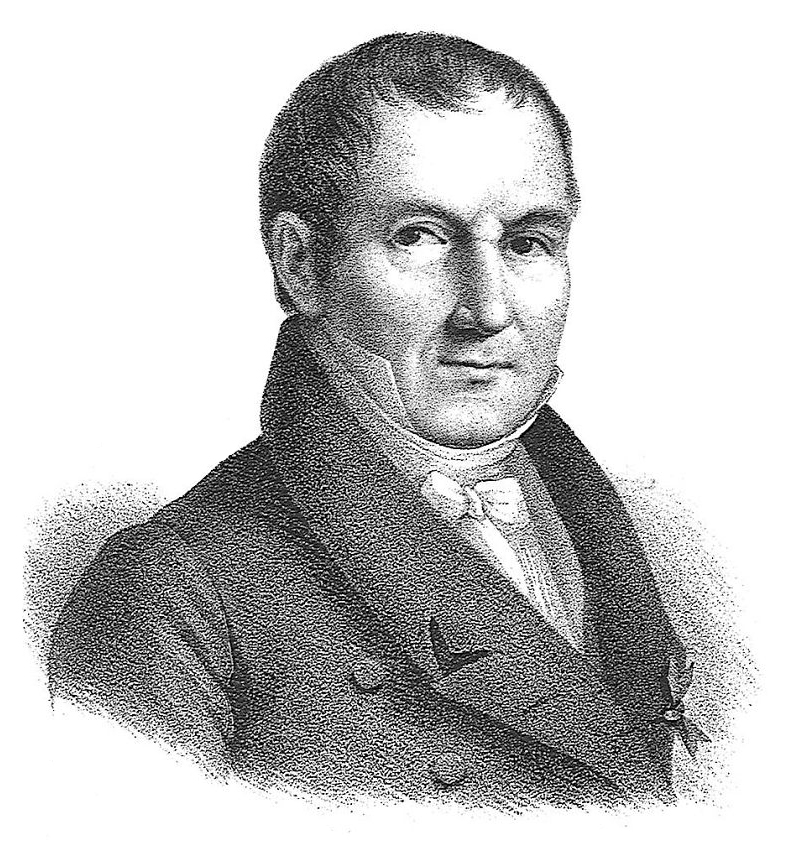
- Antoine-Athanase Royer-Collard
- Born: February 7, 1768; Sompuis, France
- Died: November 27, 1825 (aged 57)
- Citizenship: France
- Scientific career
- Fields: Medicine, psychiatry, forensic medicine
- Workplaces: Charenton

Antoine-Athanase Royer-Collard (7 February 1768 – 27 November 1825) was a French medical doctor and psychiatrist. He was a younger brother to philosopher Pierre-Paul Royer-Collard (1763–1845).

Royer-Collard was born in Sompuis, France. He studied medicine in Paris, and in 1802 received his doctorate with a dissertation on amenorrhea ("Essai sur l'aménorrhée, ou suppression du flux menstruel"). In 1806, he was named chief physician at the Charenton mental asylum, and in 1816 became a professor of forensic medicine at the University of Paris. In 1819, he was appointed to the first chair of médecine mentale. Among his better known students were Antoine Laurent Bayle and Louis-Florentin Calmeil.

In 1803, he founded the periodical "Bibliothèque médicale". In 1820, he was elected a member of the Académie nationale de médecine. After his death at Paris in 1825, his position at the Charenton was filled by Jean-Étienne Dominique Esquirol.

One of his famous patients at the Charenton was Donatien Alphonse François de Sade (1740–1814), better known as Marquis de Sade, who spent the last eleven years of his life incarcerated at the asylum. Royer-Collard protested against de Sade's imprisonment at the Charenton, believing him to be sane, and asked that he be placed in a conventional prison.

== Fictional portrayals ==
A heavily fictionalized version of Royer-Collard serves as the main antagonist of the play Quills by Doug Wright. He is portrayed as the cruel administrator of Charenton Asylum and jailer of the Marquis de Sade, who tortures de Sade as punishment for smuggling his writing out of the hospital and causing disruption among the other patients.

In the 2000 film adaptation of the play, Royer-Collard is portrayed by Michael Caine.
