= Quills (play) =

1995 play by Doug Wright

- Original language: English
- Written by: Doug Wright
- Subject: Moral nihilism, atheism, sadism, pornography
- Genre: Drama
- Setting: 1807 France

Premiere
- Date: 3 November 1995
- Place: New York Theatre Workshop
- Directed by: Howard Shalwitz

Quills is a 1995 play written by American playwright Doug Wright. The play is based on the final days of the Marquis de Sade and was directed by Howard Shalwitz. It first opened at the New York Theatre Workshop in 1995 and ran from November 3 to December 22. Wright received an Obie Award for Best Playwright. He later adapted it into the 2000 feature film of the same name directed by Philip Kaufman.

The play, set in 1807 during the Reign of Terror as a part of the French Revolution, centers around the writings and final days of the Marquis de Sade, portrayed by Rocco Sisto, who earned a Drama Desk Award nomination for his performance.

== Summary ==
The play follows the Marquis de Sade during his imprisonment in the lunatic asylum of Charenton. There, he continues to write and secretly publishes his work with the help of the vivacious and curious young laundry maid, Madeleine Leclerc. The Marquis has daily spirited debates involving morality and atheism with the Catholic priest Abbé de Coulmier. During his stay, the conservative and brutal Dr. Royer-Collard, a newly appointed chief physician, battles with the Marquis at the behest of Renée Pélagie, the Marquis' wife.

== Cast ==
Character	New York Theatre Workshop 1995	Feature film adaptation 2000
Marquis de Sade	Rocco Sisto	Geoffrey Rush
Abbé de Coulmier	Jefferson Mays	Joaquin Phoenix
Madeleine Leclerc	Katy Selverstone	Kate Winslet
Dr. Royer-Collard	Daniel Oreskes	Michael Caine
Simone / Madame Royer-Collard	Katy Selverstone	Amelia Warner
Monsieur Prouix	Kirk Jackson	Stephen Moyer
Renée Pélagie	Lola Pashalinski	Jane Menelaus

== Productions ==
The production premiered at the New York Theatre Workshop in 1995, running from 3 November through 22 December.

== Reception ==
=== Critical reception ===
The play received positive critical reception. Vincent Canby of The New York Times praised the direction, performances, and writing, "[Wright] successfully blends intentional archness, grotesque exaggeration and bold humor to create a theatrical experience of real wit". He added, "Quills doesn't mean to be an epic. It's a theatrical entertainment that manages to be serious fun along the way." Variety theatre critic Jeremy Gerard described the production as "sensational in every sense of the word... [it's] smirky, gross-out fun with a purpose." He compared it to the likes of "Titus Andronicus by way of Sweeney Todd or Pulp Fiction by way of Carrie."

=== Accolades ===
Year	Award	Category	Nominated work	Result	Ref.
1996	Obie Award	Best Playwright	Doug Wright	Won	
1996	Drama Desk Award	Outstanding Actor in a Play	Rocco Sisto	Nominated	

== Film adaptation ==
In 2000, Wright adapted the project to the screen, working with director Philip Kaufman. The film was distributed by Fox Searchlight and starred Geoffrey Rush, Kate Winslet, Joaquin Phoenix, and Michael Caine. The film premiered at the Telluride Film Festival and was later named Best Film at the National Board of Review. Wright was nominated for the Golden Globe Award for Best Screenplay, and the film went on to receive three Academy Award nominations for Best Actor, Best Production Design, and Best Costume Design.
