= Simonnet (surname) =

Simonnet is a surname of French origin.

== List of people with the surname ==
- Cécile Simonnet (1865–?), French opera singer
- Danielle Simonnet (born 1971), French politician
- François Simonnet de Coulmiers (1741–1818), French Catholic priest
- Jacques Simonnet, French politician
