= Critics' Choice Movie Award for Best Supporting Actor =

Award given by the Broadcast Film Critics Association

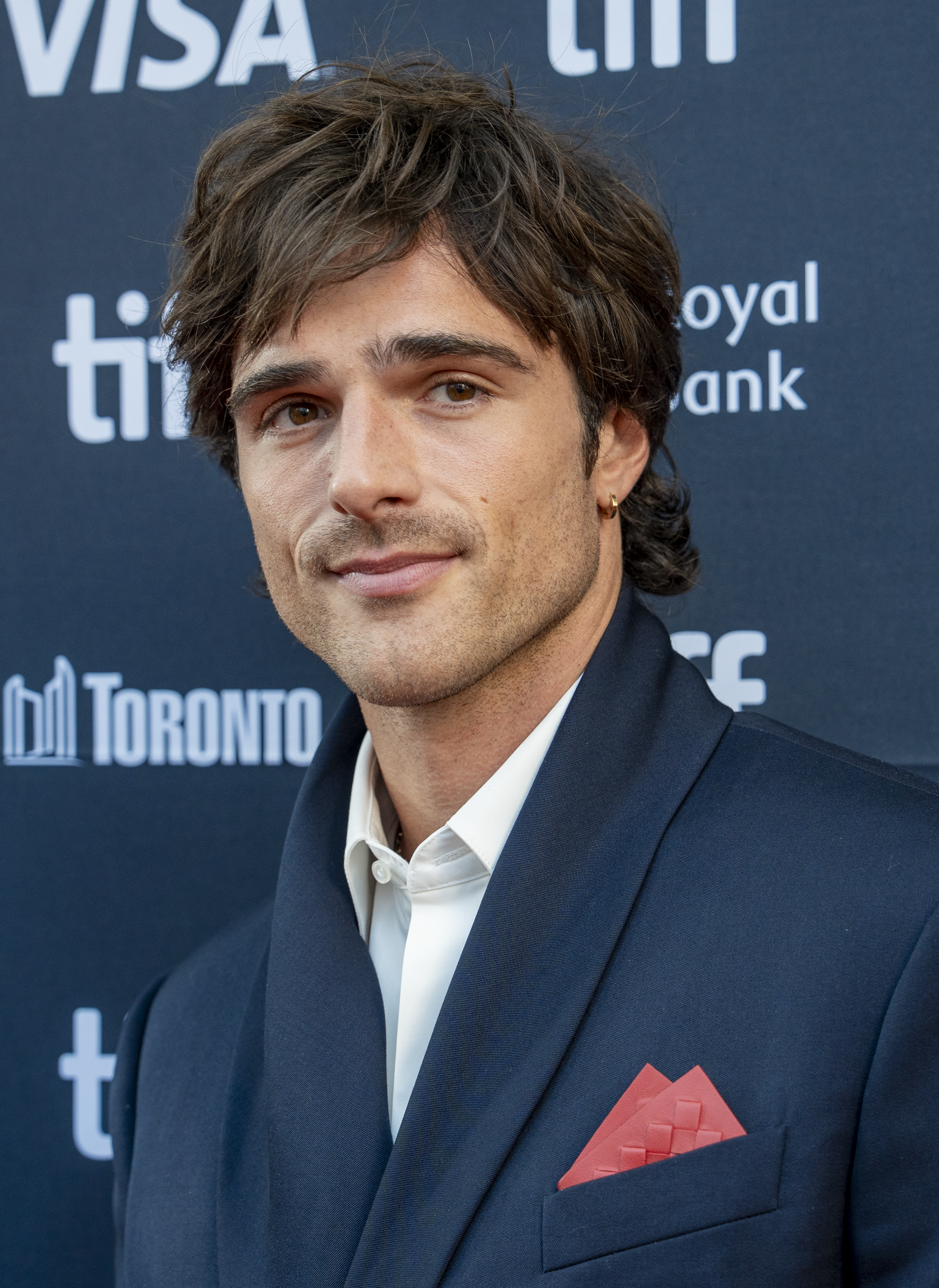
- The 2025 recipient: Jacob Elordi
- Awarded for: Best Performance by an Actor in a Supporting Role
- Location: Los Angeles, California
- Presented by: Broadcast Film Critics Association
- Currently held by: Jacob Elordi for Frankenstein (2025)
- Website: www.criticschoice.com

The Critics' Choice Movie Award for Best Supporting Actor is one of the awards given by the Broadcast Film Critics Association at their annual Critics' Choice Movie Awards for a performance in a motion picture. It was first presented in 1995 with the winners being a tie between Ed Harris for Apollo 13 and Kevin Spacey for The Usual Suspects. There were no official nominees until 2001, currently six nominees are usually presented.

Mahershala Ali is the only actor who has received this award more than once, with two wins. Mark Ruffalo holds the record of most nominations in the category with four.

== Winners and nominees ==
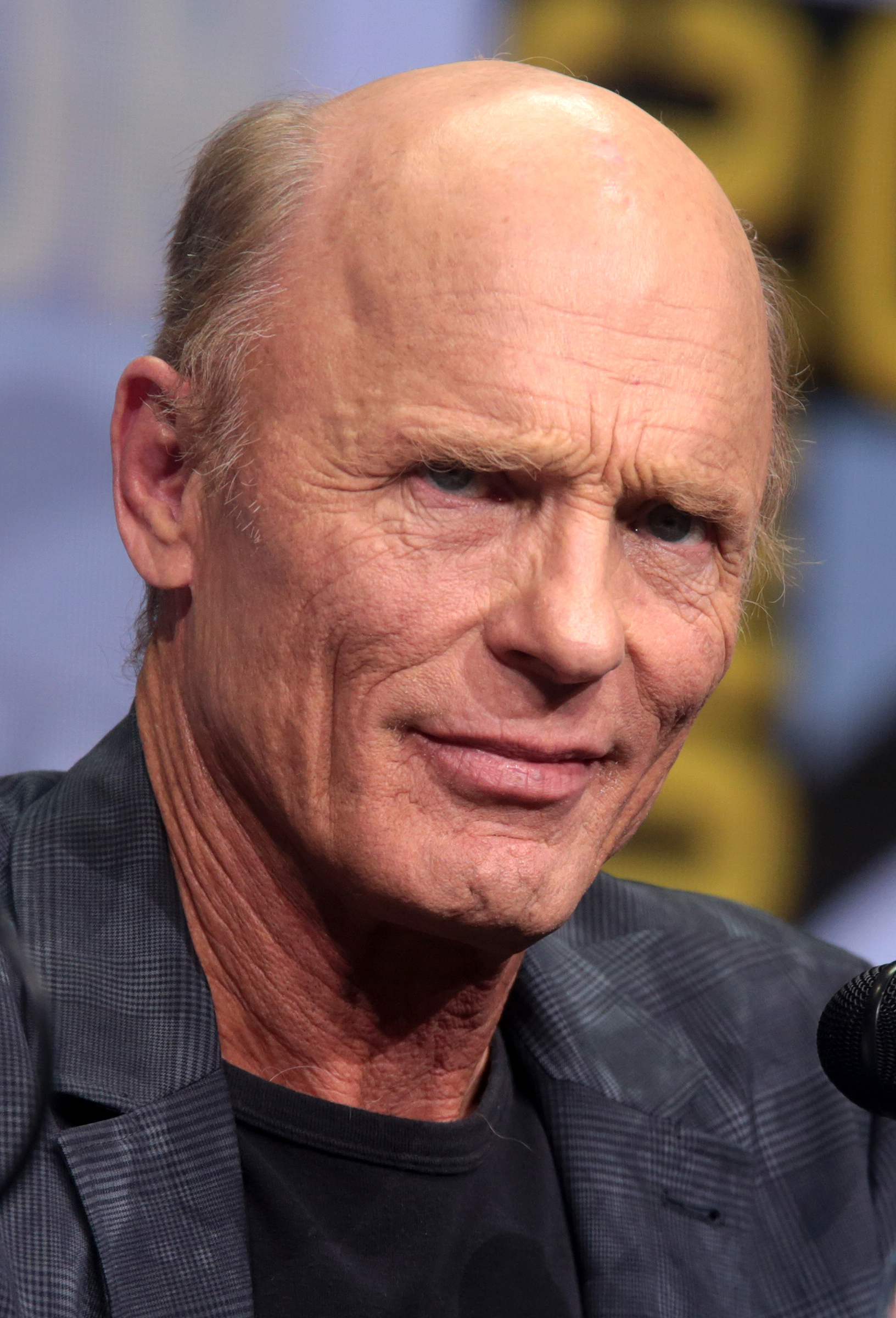
Ed Harris tied with Kevin Spacey being the first recipients of this award

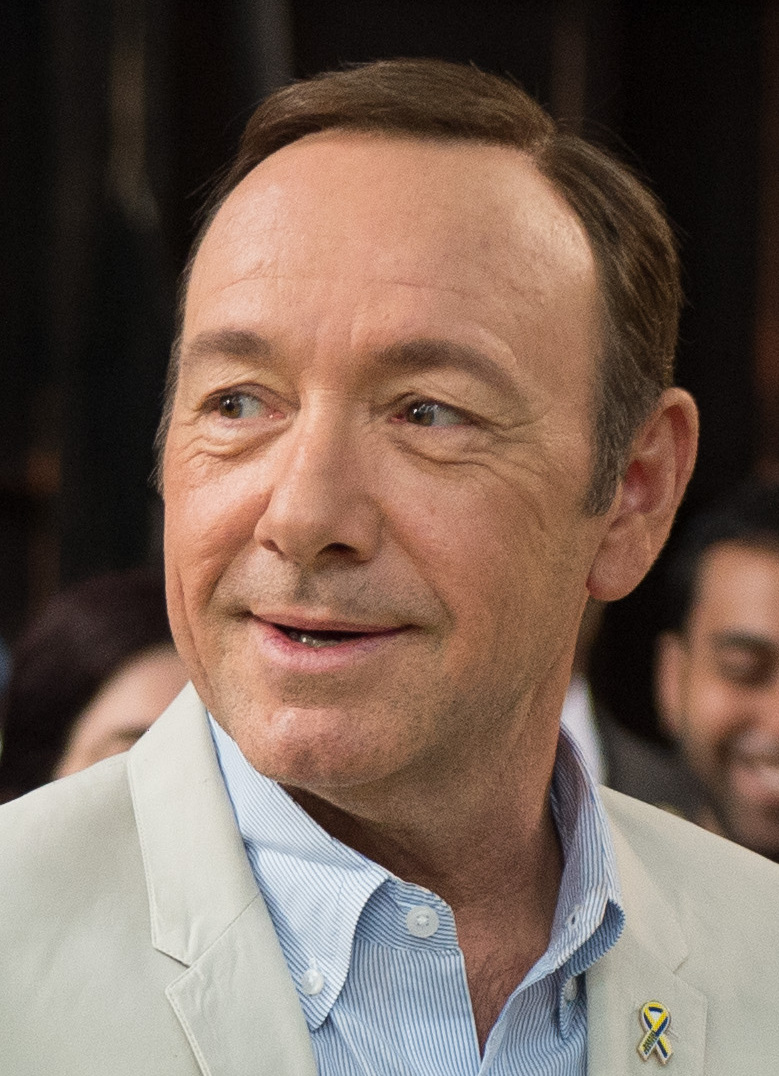
Kevin Spacey tied with Ed Harris being the first recipients of this award

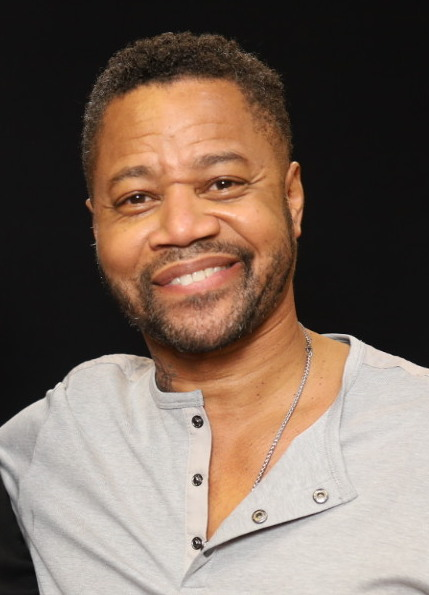
Cuba Gooding Jr. won for Jerry Maguire (1997

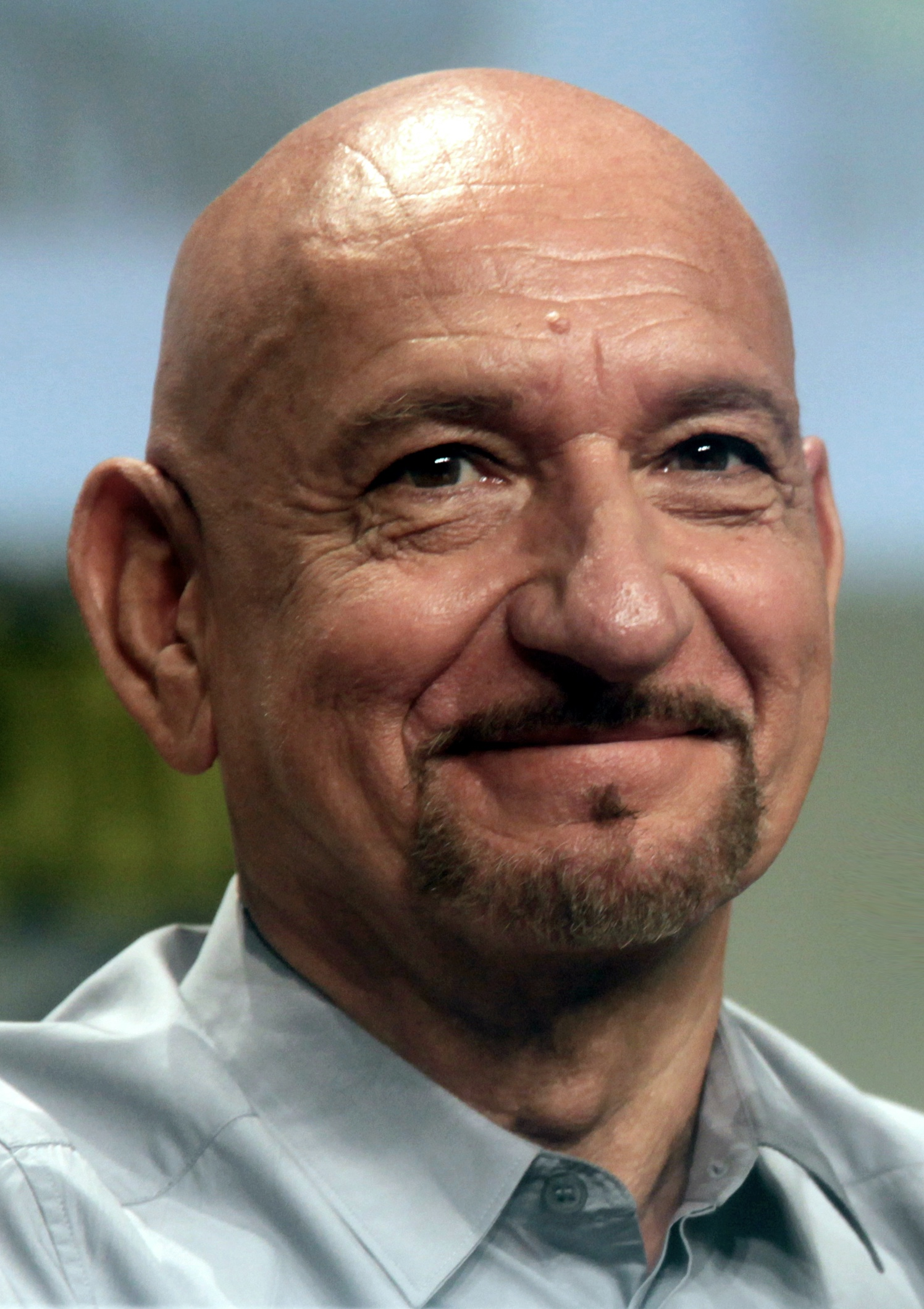
Sir Ben Kingsley won for Sexy Beast (2001)

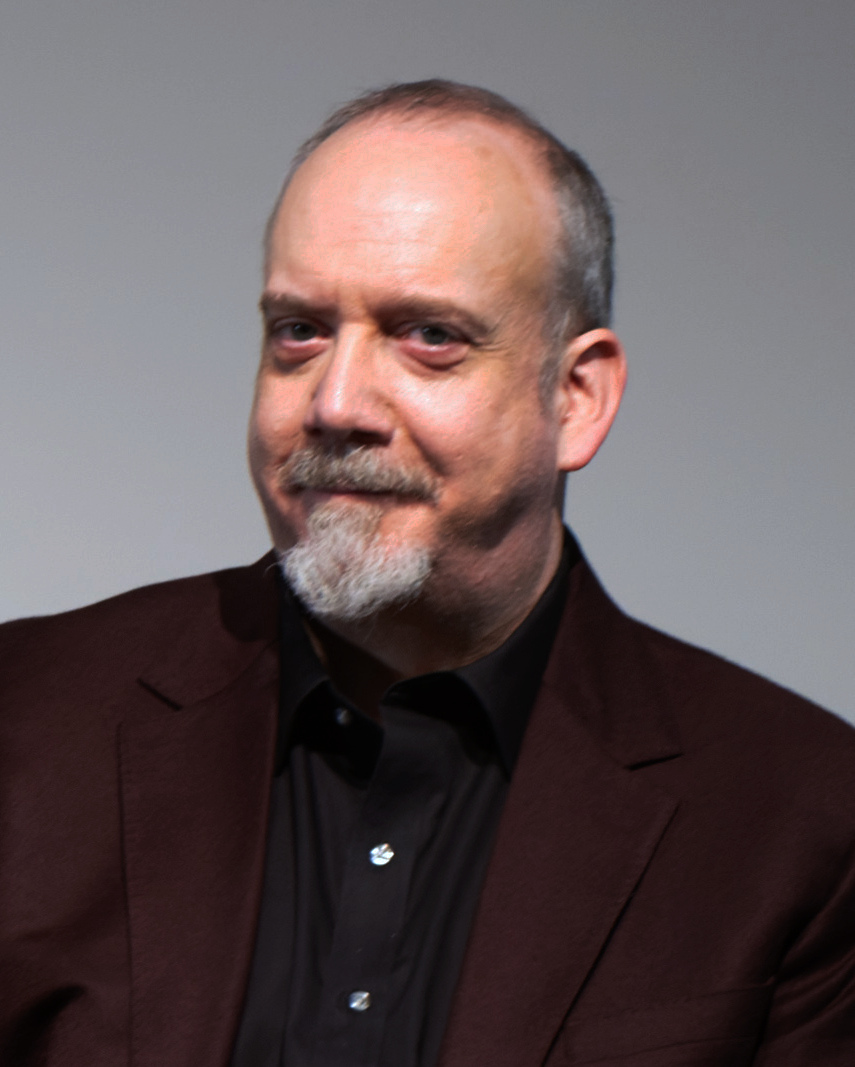
Paul Giamatti won for Cinderella Man (2004)

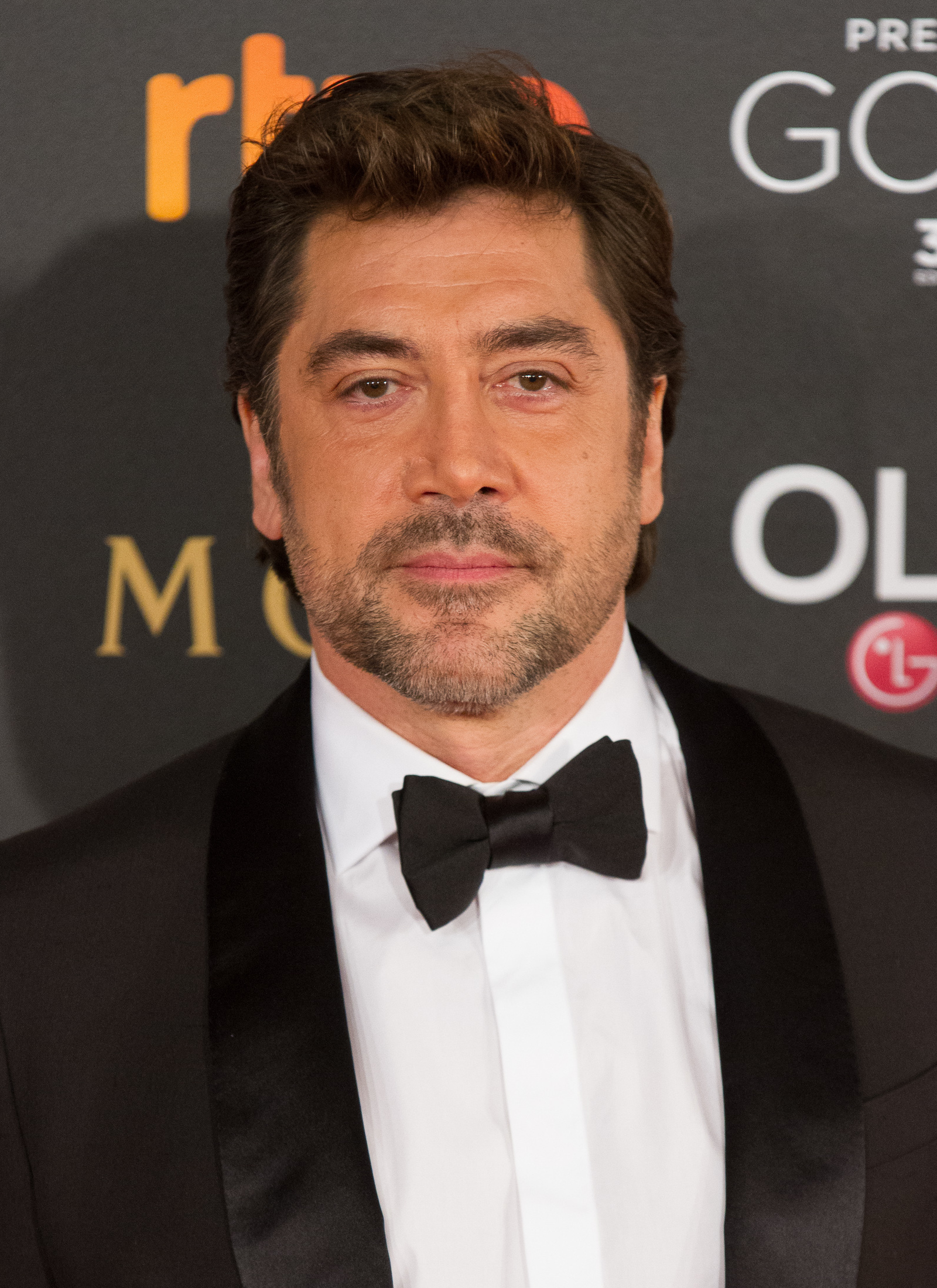
Javier Bardem won for No Country for Old Men (2007)

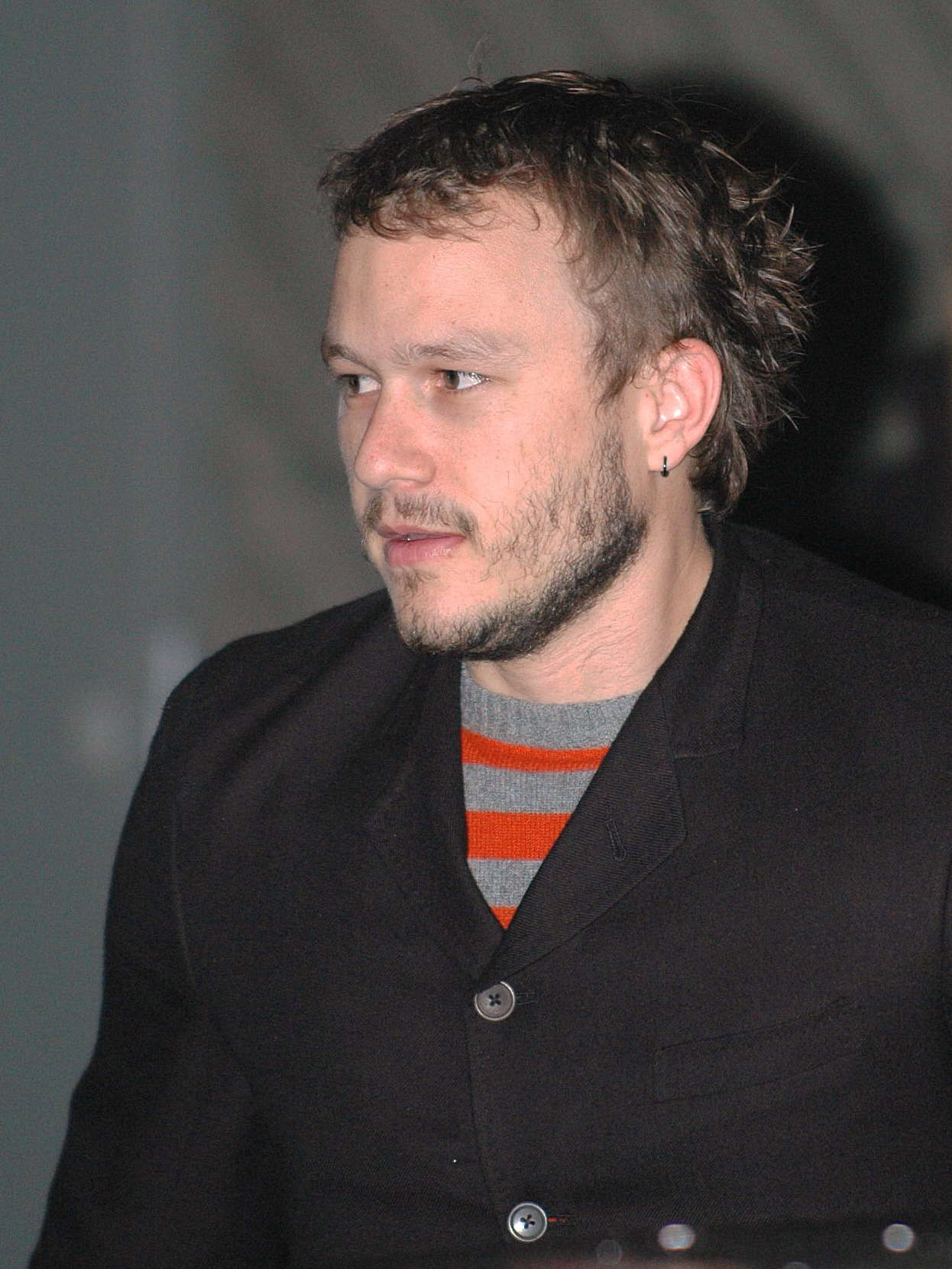
Heath Ledger won for The Dark Knight (2008)

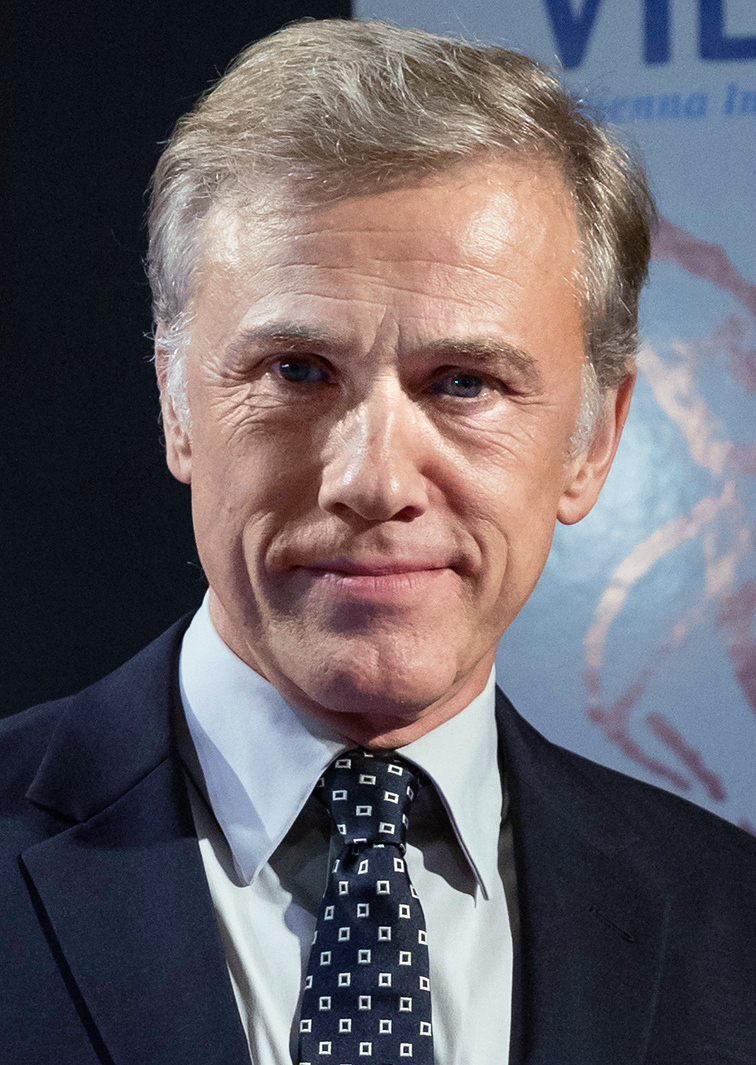
Christoph Waltz won for Inglorious Basterds (2009)

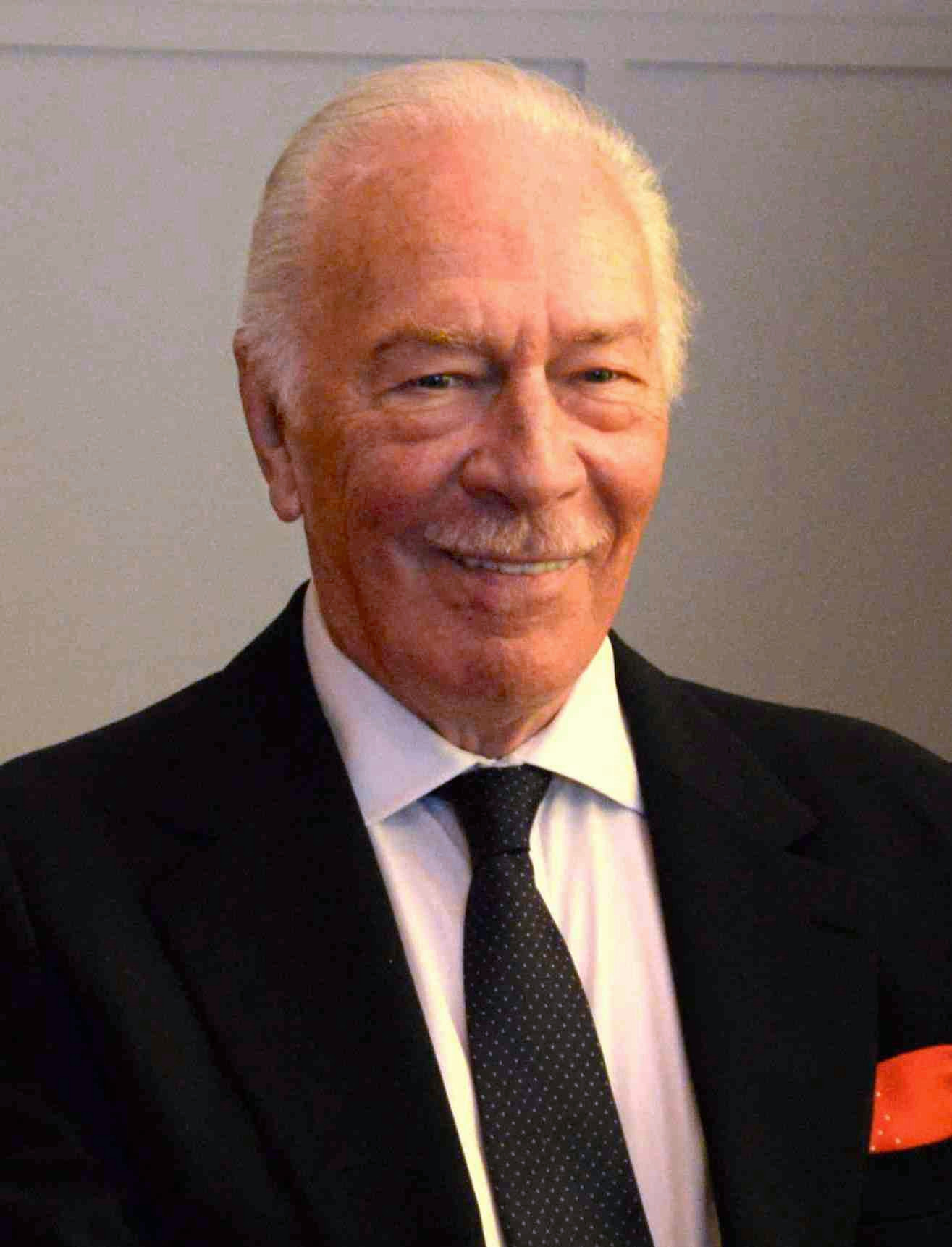
Christopher Plummer won for Beginners (2009)

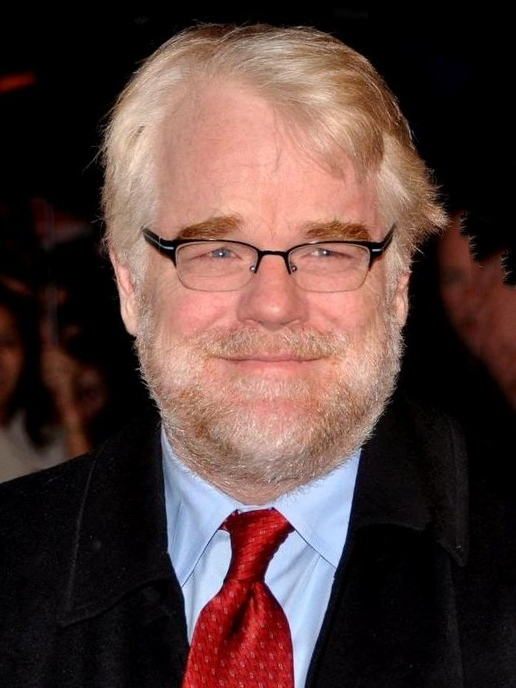
Philip Seymour Hoffman won for The Master (2012)

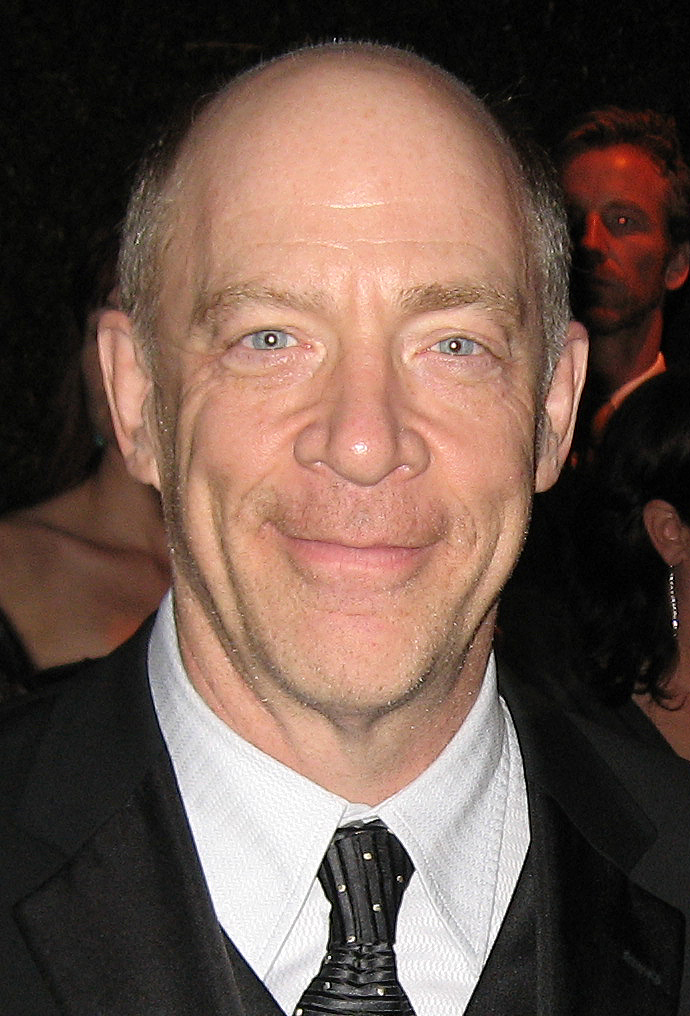
J.K. Simmons won for Whiplash (2014)

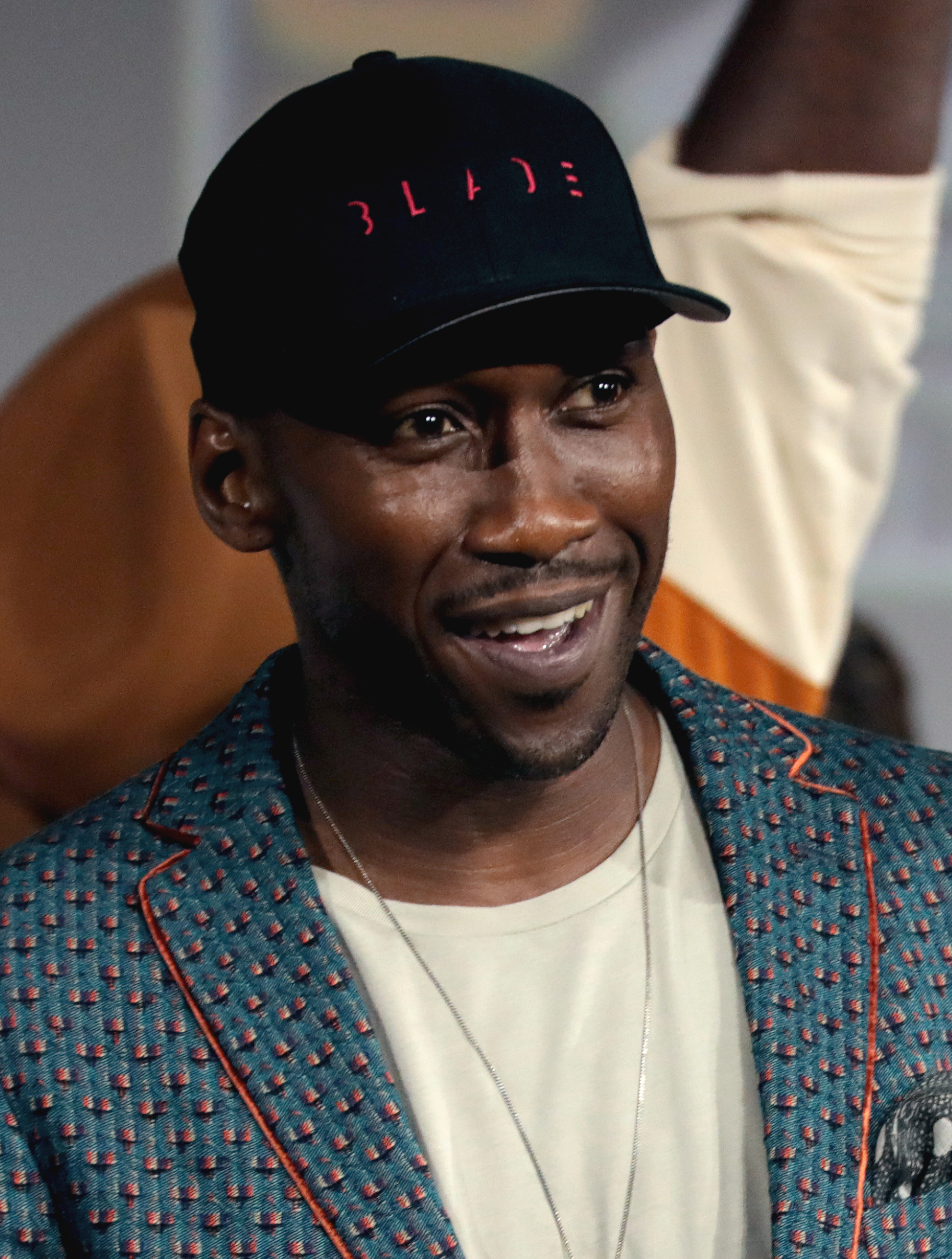
Mahershala Ali won twice for Moonlight (2016) and Green Book (2018)

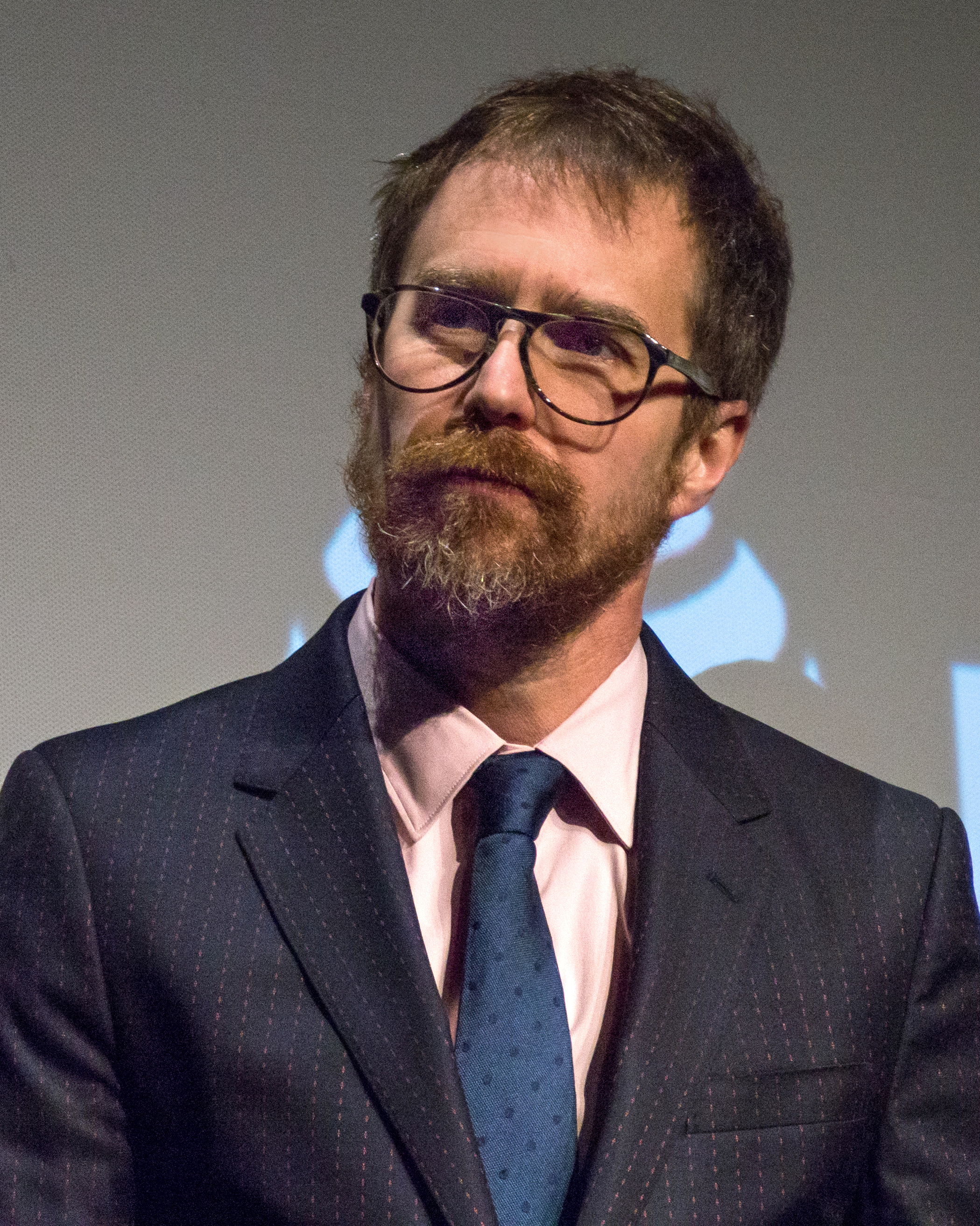
Sam Rockwell won for Three Billboards Outside Ebbing Missouri (2017)

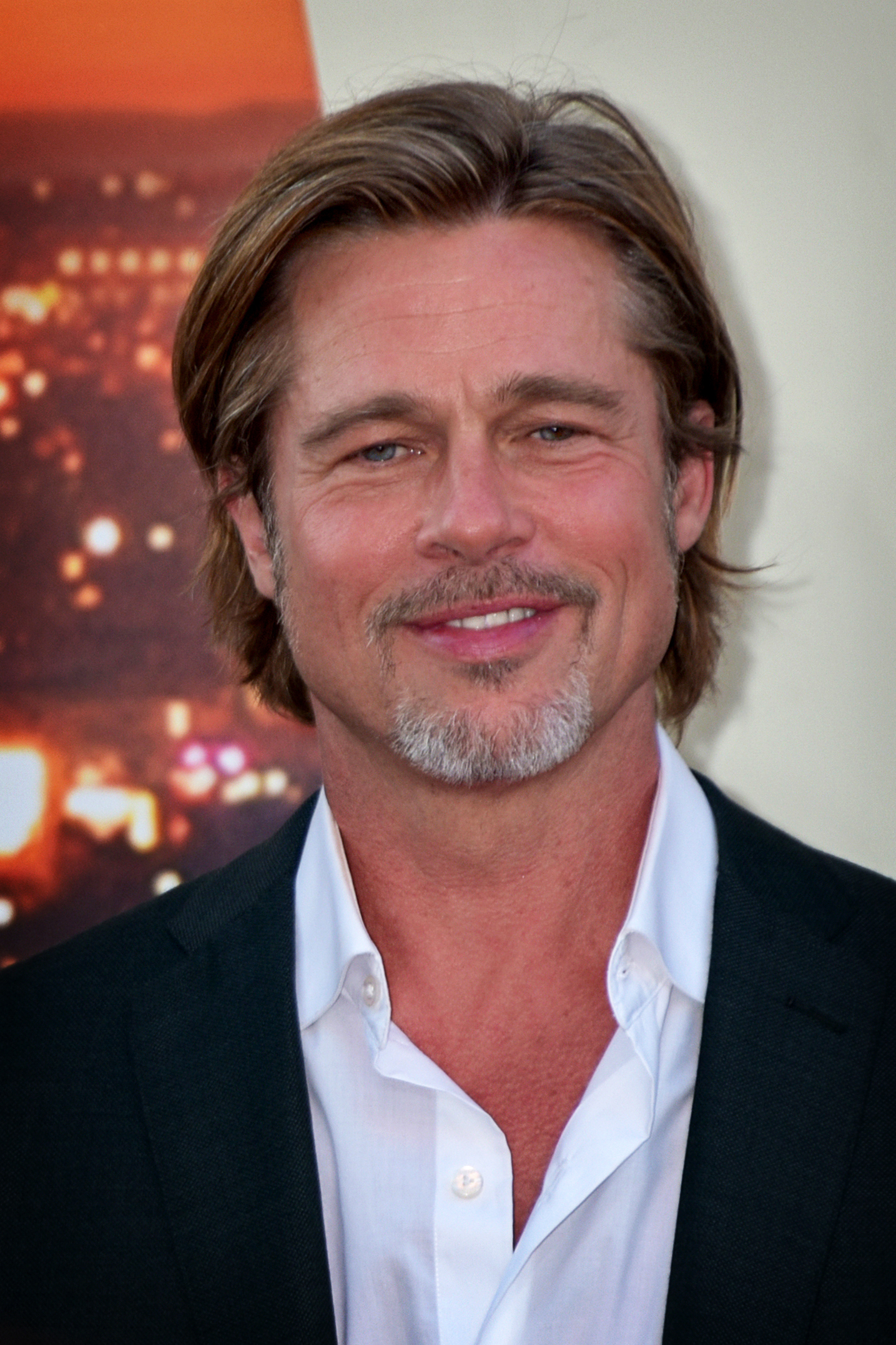
Brad Pitt won for Once Upon a Time in Hollywood (2019)

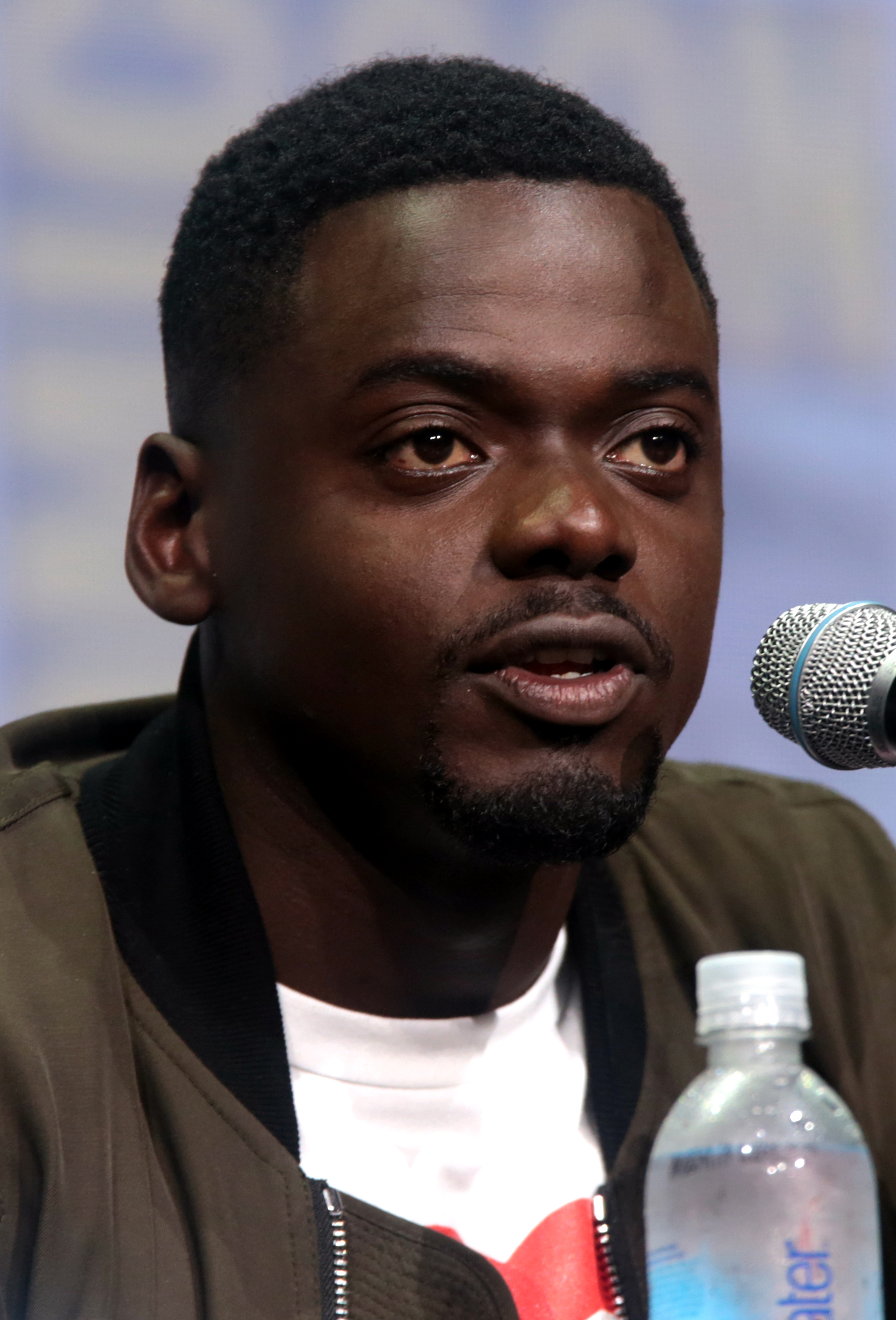
Daniel Kaluuya won for Judas and the Black Messiah (2020)

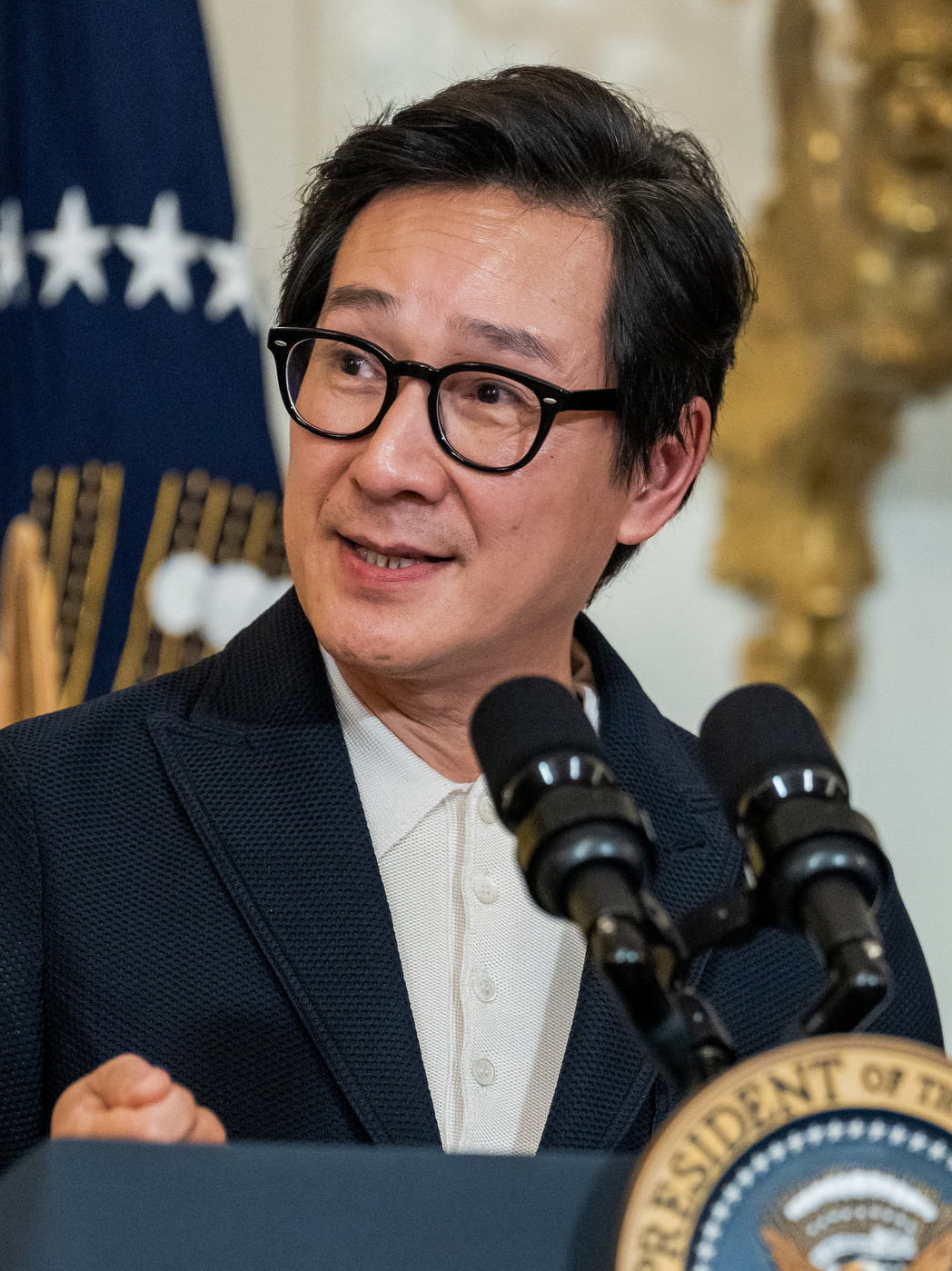
Ke Huy Quan won for Everything Everywhere All at Once (2022)

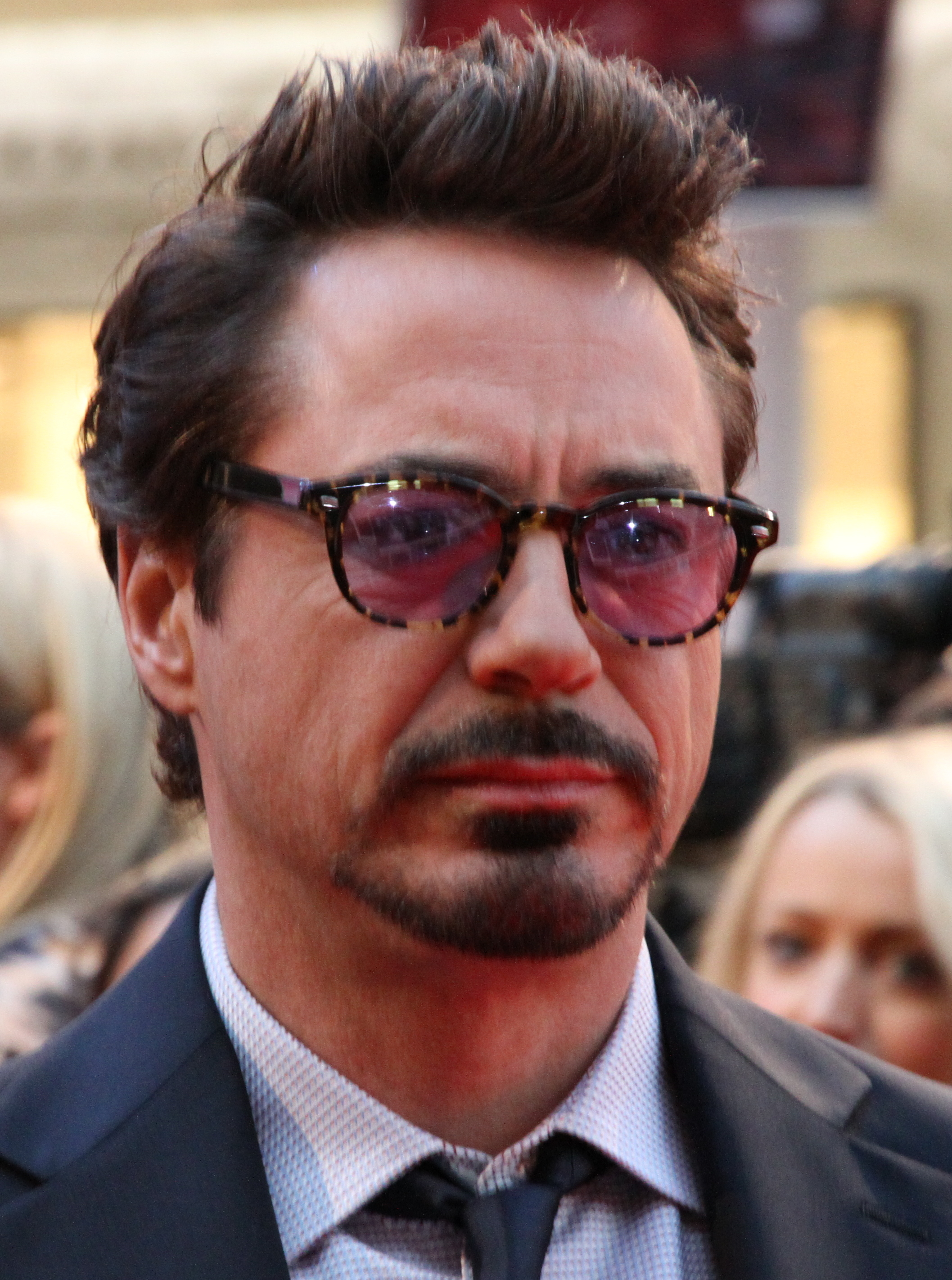
Robert Downey Jr. won for Oppenheimer (2023)

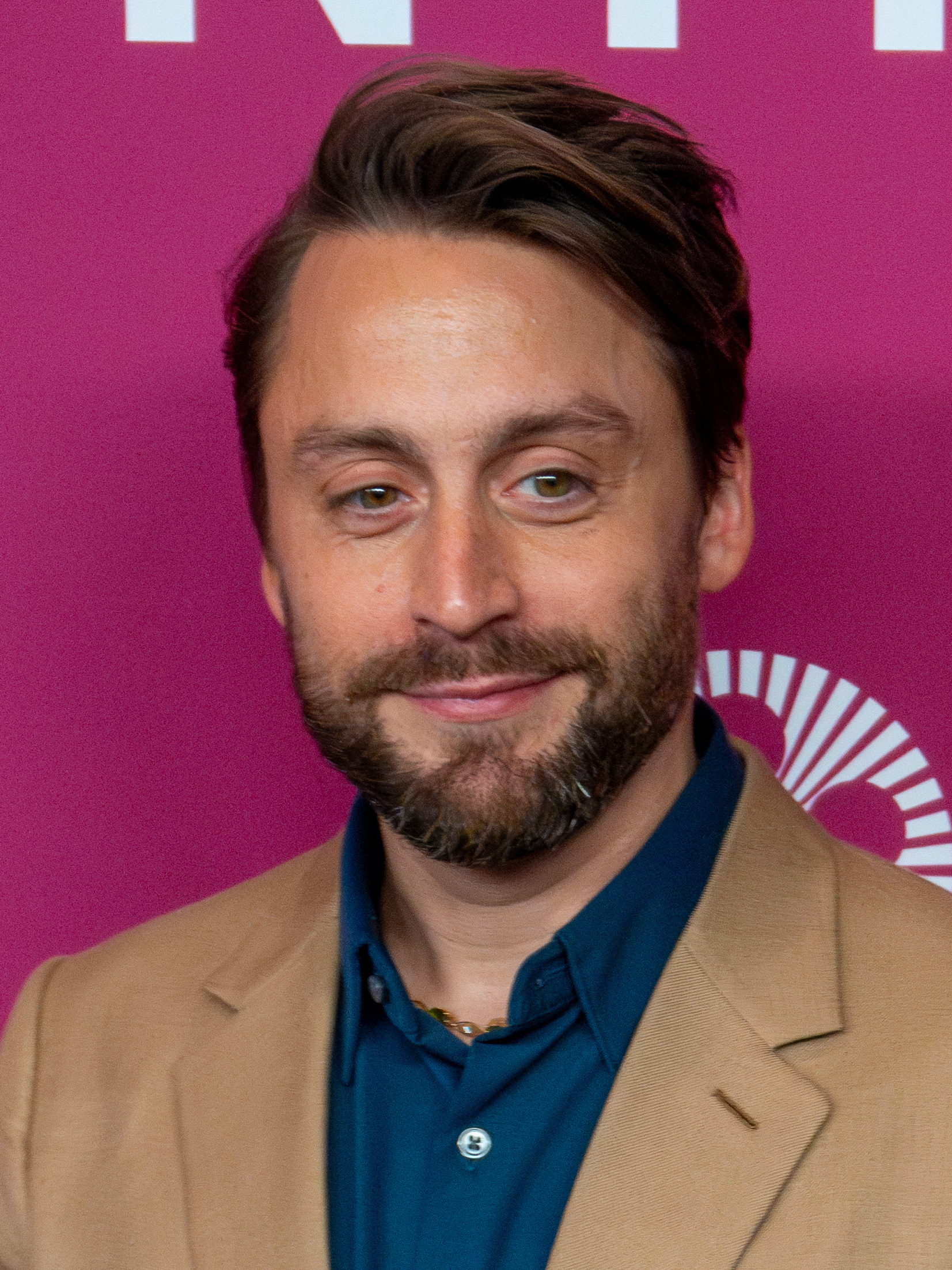
Kieran Culkin won for A Real Pain (2024)

=== 1990s ===
Year	Actor	Character	Film
1995	Ed Harris (TIE)	Gene Kranz	Apollo 13
1995	Kevin Spacey (TIE)	Roger "Verbal" Kint / Keyser Söze	The Usual Suspects
1996	Cuba Gooding Jr.	Rodney "Rod" Tidwell	Jerry Maguire
1997	Anthony Hopkins	John Quincy Adams	Amistad
1998	Billy Bob Thornton	Jacob Mitchell	A Simple Plan
1999	Michael Clarke Duncan	John Coffey	The Green Mile

=== 2000s ===
Year	Actor	Character	Film
2000	Joaquin Phoenix	Commodus / Abbé du Coulmier / Willie Gutierrez	Gladiator / Quills / The Yards
2001	Ben Kingsley	Don Logan	Sexy Beast
2001	Jim Broadbent	John Bayley	Iris
2001	Jon Voight	Howard Cosell	Ali
2002	Chris Cooper	John Laroche	Adaptation.
2002	Alfred Molina	Diego Rivera	Frida
2002	Paul Newman	John Rooney	Road to Perdition
2003	Tim Robbins	Dave Boyle	Mystic River
2003	Alec Baldwin	Shelly Kaplow	The Cooler
2003	Paul Bettany	Dr. Stephen Marturin	Master and Commander: The Far Side of the World
2003	Benicio del Toro	Jack Jordan	21 Grams
2003	Ken Watanabe	Lord Moritsugu Katsumoto	The Last Samurai
2004	Thomas Haden Church	Jack Cole	Sideways
2004	Jamie Foxx	Max Durocher	Collateral
2004	Morgan Freeman	Eddie "Scrap Iron" Dupris	Million Dollar Baby
2004	Clive Owen	Larry Gray	Closer
2004	Peter Sarsgaard	Clyde Martin	Kinsey
2005	Paul Giamatti	Joe Gould	Cinderella Man
2005	George Clooney	Bob Barnes	Syriana
2005	Kevin Costner	Denny Davies	The Upside of Anger
2005	Matt Dillon	Sgt. John Ryan	Crash
2005	Terrence Howard	Cameron Thayer	Crash
2005	Jake Gyllenhaal	Jack Twist	Brokeback Mountain
2006	Eddie Murphy	James "Thunder" Early	Dreamgirls
2006	Ben Affleck	George Reeves	Hollywoodland
2006	Alan Arkin	Edwin Hoover	Little Miss Sunshine
2006	Adam Beach	Ira Hayes	Flags of Our Fathers
2006	Djimon Hounsou	Solomon Vandy	Blood Diamond
2006	Jack Nicholson	Francis "Frank" Costello	The Departed
2007	Javier Bardem	Anton Chigurh	No Country for Old Men
2007	Casey Affleck	Robert Ford	The Assassination of Jesse James by the Coward Robert Ford
2007	Philip Seymour Hoffman	Gust Avrakotos	Charlie Wilson's War
2007	Hal Holbrook	Ron Franz	Into the Wild
2007	Tom Wilkinson	Arthur Edens	Michael Clayton
2008	Heath Ledger (posthumously)	Joker	The Dark Knight
2008	Josh Brolin	Dan White	Milk
2008	James Franco	Scott Smith	Milk
2008	Robert Downey Jr.	Kirk Lazarus	Tropic Thunder
2008	Philip Seymour Hoffman	Father Brendan Flynn	Doubt
2009	Christoph Waltz	Col. Hans Landa	Inglourious Basterds
2009	Matt Damon	Francois Pienaar	Invictus
2009	Woody Harrelson	Cpt. Tony Stone	The Messenger
2009	Christian McKay	Orson Welles	Me and Orson Welles
2009	Alfred Molina	Jack Mellor	An Education
2009	Stanley Tucci	George Harvey	The Lovely Bones

=== 2010s ===
Year	Actor	Character	Film
2010	Christian Bale	Richard "Dicky" Eklund Jr.	The Fighter
2010	Andrew Garfield	Eduardo Saverin	The Social Network
2010	Jeremy Renner	James "Jem" Coughlin	The Town
2010	Sam Rockwell	Kenny Waters	Conviction
2010	Mark Ruffalo	Paul Hatfield	The Kids Are All Right
2010	Geoffrey Rush	Lionel Logue	The King's Speech
2011	Christopher Plummer	Hal Fields	Beginners
2011	Kenneth Branagh	Laurence Olivier	My Week with Marilyn
2011	Albert Brooks	Bernie Rose	Drive
2011	Nick Nolte	Paddy Conlon	Warrior
2011	Patton Oswalt	Matt Freehauf	Young Adult
2011	Andy Serkis	Caesar	Rise of the Planet of the Apes
2012	Philip Seymour Hoffman	Lancaster Dodd	The Master
2012	Alan Arkin	Lester Siegel	Argo
2012	Javier Bardem	Raoul Silva	Skyfall
2012	Robert De Niro	Patrizio "Pat" Solitano, Sr.	Silver Linings Playbook
2012	Tommy Lee Jones	Thaddeus Stevens	Lincoln
2012	Matthew McConaughey	Dallas	Magic Mike
2013	Jared Leto	Rayon	Dallas Buyers Club
2013	Barkhad Abdi	Abduwali Muse	Captain Phillips
2013	Daniel Brühl	Niki Lauda	Rush
2013	Bradley Cooper	FBI Agent Richard "Richie" DiMaso	American Hustle
2013	Michael Fassbender	Edwin Epps	12 Years a Slave
2013	James Gandolfini	Albert	Enough Said
2014	J. K. Simmons	Terence Fletcher	Whiplash
2014	Josh Brolin	Lt. Det. Christian F. "Bigfoot" Bjornsen	Inherent Vice
2014	Robert Duvall	Judge Joseph Palmer	The Judge
2014	Ethan Hawke	Mason Evans Sr.	Boyhood
2014	Edward Norton	Mike Shiner	Birdman
2014	Mark Ruffalo	Dave Schultz	Foxcatcher
2015	Sylvester Stallone	Rocky Balboa	Creed
2015	Paul Dano	Brian Wilson	Love & Mercy
2015	Tom Hardy	John Fitzgerald	The Revenant
2015	Mark Ruffalo	Michael Rezendes	Spotlight
2015	Mark Rylance	Rudolf Abel	Bridge of Spies
2015	Michael Shannon	Rick Carver	99 Homes
2016	Mahershala Ali	Juan	Moonlight
2016	Jeff Bridges	Marcus Hamilton	Hell or High Water
2016	Ben Foster	Tanner Howard	Hell or High Water
2016	Lucas Hedges	Patrick Chandler	Manchester by the Sea
2016	Dev Patel	Saroo Brierley	Lion
2016	Michael Shannon	Detective Bobby Andes	Nocturnal Animals
2017	Sam Rockwell	Officer Jason Dixon	Three Billboards Outside Ebbing, Missouri
2017	Willem Dafoe	Bobby Hicks	The Florida Project
2017	Armie Hammer	Oliver	Call Me by Your Name
2017	Michael Stuhlbarg	Mr. Perlman	Call Me by Your Name
2017	Richard Jenkins	Giles	The Shape of Water
2017	Patrick Stewart	Professor Charles Xavier	Logan
2018	Mahershala Ali	Don Shirley	Green Book
2018	Timothée Chalamet	Nic Sheff	Beautiful Boy
2018	Adam Driver	Flip Zimmerman	BlacKkKlansman
2018	Sam Elliott	Bobby Maine	A Star Is Born
2018	Richard E. Grant	Jack Hock	Can You Ever Forgive Me?
2018	Michael B. Jordan	N'Jadaka / Erik "Killmonger" Stevens	Black Panther
2019	Brad Pitt	Cliff Booth	Once Upon a Time in Hollywood
2019	Willem Dafoe	Thomas Wake	The Lighthouse
2019	Tom Hanks	Fred Rogers	A Beautiful Day in the Neighborhood
2019	Anthony Hopkins	Pope Benedict XVI	The Two Popes
2019	Al Pacino	Jimmy Hoffa	The Irishman
2019	Joe Pesci	Russell Bufalino	The Irishman

=== 2020s ===
Year	Actor	Character	Film
2020	Daniel Kaluuya	Fred Hampton	Judas and the Black Messiah
2020	Sacha Baron Cohen	Abbie Hoffman	The Trial of the Chicago 7
2020	Chadwick Boseman	"Stormin'" Norman Earl Holloway	Da 5 Bloods
2020	Bill Murray	Felix Keane	On the Rocks
2020	Leslie Odom Jr.	Sam Cooke	One Night in Miami...
2020	Paul Raci	Joe	Sound of Metal
2021	Troy Kotsur	Frank Rossi	CODA
2021	Jamie Dornan	Pa	Belfast
2021	Ciarán Hinds	Pop	Belfast
2021	Jared Leto	Paolo Gucci	House of Gucci
2021	J. K. Simmons	William Frawley	Being the Ricardos
2021	Kodi Smit-McPhee	Peter Gordon	The Power of the Dog
2022	Ke Huy Quan	Waymond Wang	Everything Everywhere All at Once
2022	Paul Dano	Burt Fabelman	The Fabelmans
2022	Judd Hirsch	Boris Podgorny	The Fabelmans
2022	Brendan Gleeson	Colm Doherty	The Banshees of Inisherin
2022	Barry Keoghan	Dominic Kearney	The Banshees of Inisherin
2022	Brian Tyree Henry	James Aucoin	Causeway
2023	Robert Downey Jr.	Lewis Strauss	Oppenheimer
2023	Sterling K. Brown	Clifford "Cliff" Ellison	American Fiction
2023	Robert De Niro	William King Hale	Killers of the Flower Moon
2023	Ryan Gosling	Ken	Barbie
2023	Charles Melton	Joe Yoo	May December
2023	Mark Ruffalo	Duncan Wedderburn	Poor Things
2024	Kieran Culkin	Benji Kaplan	A Real Pain
2024	Yura Borisov	Igor	Anora
2024	Clarence Maclin	himself	Sing Sing
2024	Edward Norton	Pete Seeger	A Complete Unknown
2024	Guy Pearce	Harrison Lee Van Buren	The Brutalist
2024	Denzel Washington	Macrinus	Gladiator II
2025	Jacob Elordi	The Creature	Frankenstein
2025	Benicio del Toro	Sergio St. Carlos	One Battle After Another
2025	Paul Mescal	William Shakespeare	Hamnet
2025	Sean Penn	Col. Steven J. Lockjaw	One Battle After Another
2025	Adam Sandler	Ron Sukenick	Jay Kelly
2025	Stellan Skarsgård	Gustav Borg	Sentimental Value

== Multiple nominees ==
2 nominations

- Mahershala Ali
- Alan Arkin
- Javier Bardem
- Josh Brolin
- Willem Dafoe
- Paul Dano
- Robert De Niro
- Robert Downey Jr.
- Anthony Hopkins
- Jared Leto
- Alfred Molina
- Edward Norton
- Sam Rockwell
- J. K. Simmons
- Michael Shannon
- Benicio del Toro

3 nominations

- Philip Seymour Hoffman

4 nominations

- Mark Ruffalo

== Multiple winners ==
2 wins

- Mahershala Ali

== See also ==
- Academy Award for Best Supporting Actor
- BAFTA Award for Best Actor in a Supporting Role
- Independent Spirit Award for Best Supporting Male
- Golden Globe Award for Best Supporting Actor – Motion Picture
- Screen Actors Guild Award for Outstanding Performance by a Male Actor in a Supporting Role
