= Marat/Sade (film) =

1966 British film by Peter Brook

- DVD cover
- Directed by: Peter Brook
- Written by: Adrian Mitchell; Geoffrey Skelton
- Based on: Marat/Sade (1964 play) by Peter Weiss
- Produced by: Michael Birkett
- Starring: Patrick Magee; Ian Richardson; Michael Williams; Clifford Rose; Glenda Jackson; Freddie Jones
- Cinematography: David Watkin
- Edited by: Tom Priestley
- Music by: Richard Peaslee; Patrick Gowers
- Production company: Royal Shakespeare Company; Marat/Sade Productions
- Distributed by: United Artists
- Release dates: 22 February 1967 (New York City, premiere); 8 March 1967 (London)
- Running time: 116 minutes
- Country: United Kingdom
- Language: English

The Persecution and Assassination of Jean-Paul Marat as Performed by the Inmates of the Asylum of Charenton Under the Direction of the Marquis de Sade, usually shortened to Marat/Sade (pronounced [ma.ʁa.sad]) (Note: The film uses the full title in the opening credits, though most of the publicity materials use the shortened form.), is a 1967 British film adaptation of Peter Weiss's 1964 play. It is directed by Peter Brook, and originated in his stage production for the Royal Shakespeare Company, which later transferred to Broadway. The film stars Ian Richardson, Patrick Magee, Glenda Jackson, Clifford Rose, and Freddie Jones, reprising their roles from the stage version.

The film premiered on 22 February 1967, and received widespread positive reviews from critics.

== Plot ==
In the Charenton Asylum in 1808, the Marquis de Sade stages a play about the murder of Jean-Paul Marat by Charlotte Corday, using his fellow inmates as actors. The director of the hospital, Monsieur Coulmier, supervises the performance, accompanied by his wife and daughter. Coulmier, who supports Napoleon's government, believes that the play will support his bourgeois and reactionary ideas, and denounce those of the more radical stages of the French Revolution that Marat helped lead. His patients, however, have other ideas, and they make a habit of speaking lines he had attempted to suppress, or deviating entirely into personal opinion. The Marquis himself, meanwhile, subtly manipulates both the players and the audience to create an atmosphere of chaos and nihilism that ultimately brings on an orgy of destruction.

== Cast ==
- Patrick Magee as Marquis de Sade
- Ian Richardson as Jean-Paul Marat
- Michael Williams as Herald
- Clifford Rose as Monsieur Coulmier
- Glenda Jackson as Charlotte Corday
- Freddie Jones as Cucurucu
- Hugh Sullivan as Kokol
- John Hussey as Newly Rich Lady
- W. Morgan Sheppard as A Mad Animal
- Jonathan Burn as Polpoch
- Jeanette Landis as Rossignol
- Robert Langdon Lloyd as Jacques Roux
- John Steiner as Monsieur Dupere
- James Mellor as Schoolmaster
- Henry Woolf as Father
- Mark Jones as Mother
- John Harwood as Voltaire
- Leon Lissek as Lavoisier
- Susan Williamson as Simonne Évrard
- Brenda Kempner as Madame Coulmier
- Ruth Baker as Mademoiselle Coulmier
- Ian Hogg as Military Representative

== Production ==
Filming took place at Pinewood Studios in Buckinghamshire. David Watkin was the cinematographer.

== Release ==
The film held its world premiere in New York City on 22 February 1967, and had its UK premiere in London on 8 March.

== Reception ==
=== Critical response ===
Roger Ebert gave the film a positive review, "The actors are superb. When we first see the Marquis (Patrick Magee), he looks steadily into the camera for half a minute and the full terror of his perversion becomes clearer than any dialog can make it. Glenda Jackson, as Marat's assassin Charlotte Corday, weaves back and forth between the melancholy of her mental illness and the fire of the role she plays. Ian Richardson, as Marat, still advocates violence and revolution even though thousands have died and nothing has been accomplished."

Film critic Leonard Maltin awarded the film 4 out of a possible 4 stars, calling the film "chilling", and praising the film's atmosphere as being "so vivid that it seems actors are breathing down your neck".

Film review aggregator Rotten Tomatoes reported an approval rating of 94%, based on 14 reviews, with an average rating of 8/10.

=== Accolades ===
Institution	Year	Category	Nominee	Result
Kinema Junpo	1969	Best Foreign-Language Film	Peter Brook	4th place
Locarno International Film Festival	1967	Youth Jury Mention (Feature Films)	Peter Brook	Won
Nastro d'Argento	1969	Best Foreign Director	Peter Brook	Won (Note: Tied with Robert Bresson for Mouchette.)
