= Antoine Laurent Bayle =

French physician

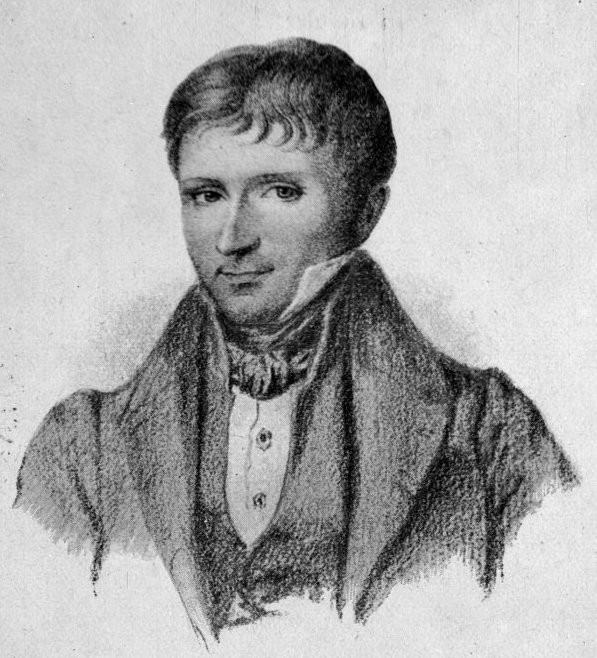
Antoine Laurent Jessé Bayle

Antoine Laurent Jessé Bayle (13 January 1799 – 29 March 1858) was a French medical doctor known for first describing paralytic dementia. He was born in Le Vernet, Alpes-de-Haute-Provence, and was a nephew to pathologist Gaspard Laurent Bayle (1774–1816).

Bayle studied medicine in Paris, and worked as an intern under Antoine-Athanase Royer-Collard (1768–1825) at the Charenton mental asylum. Later he became an associate professor and deputy librarian of the Faculté de Médecine de Paris. He resigned from this position in 1834 and opened a private practice.

In 1822 Bayle was the first medical doctor to provide a comprehensive description of general paresis, which is sometimes referred to as paralytic dementia, general paralysis of the insane, or "maladie de Bayle" in medical literature. In 1824 he founded the journal Revue médicale, and from 1828 to 1837 was publisher of the multi-volume Bibliothèque de thérapeutique (Library of Therapeutics).

== Selected writings ==
- Traité élémentaire d'anatomie, ou, Description succincte des organes et des éléments organiques qui composent le corps humain.
- "A manual of anatomy; arranged so as to afford a concise and accurate description of the different parts of the human body", Edinburgh, Black, 1825.
- Traité des maladies du cerveau et de ses membranes; maladies mentales, 1826
- "A manual of general anatomy : containing a concise description of the elementary tissues of the human body", Philadelphia : Grigg, 1828.
- "An elementary treatise on anatomy", New-York : Harper & Brothers, 1837.
- Biographie médicale par ordre chronologique d'après Daniel Leclerc, Eloy etc., 1855.

== Bibliography ==
- French Psychiatry's Initial Reception of Bayle's Discovery of General Paresis of the Insane
