= Gaspard Laurent Bayle =

French physician

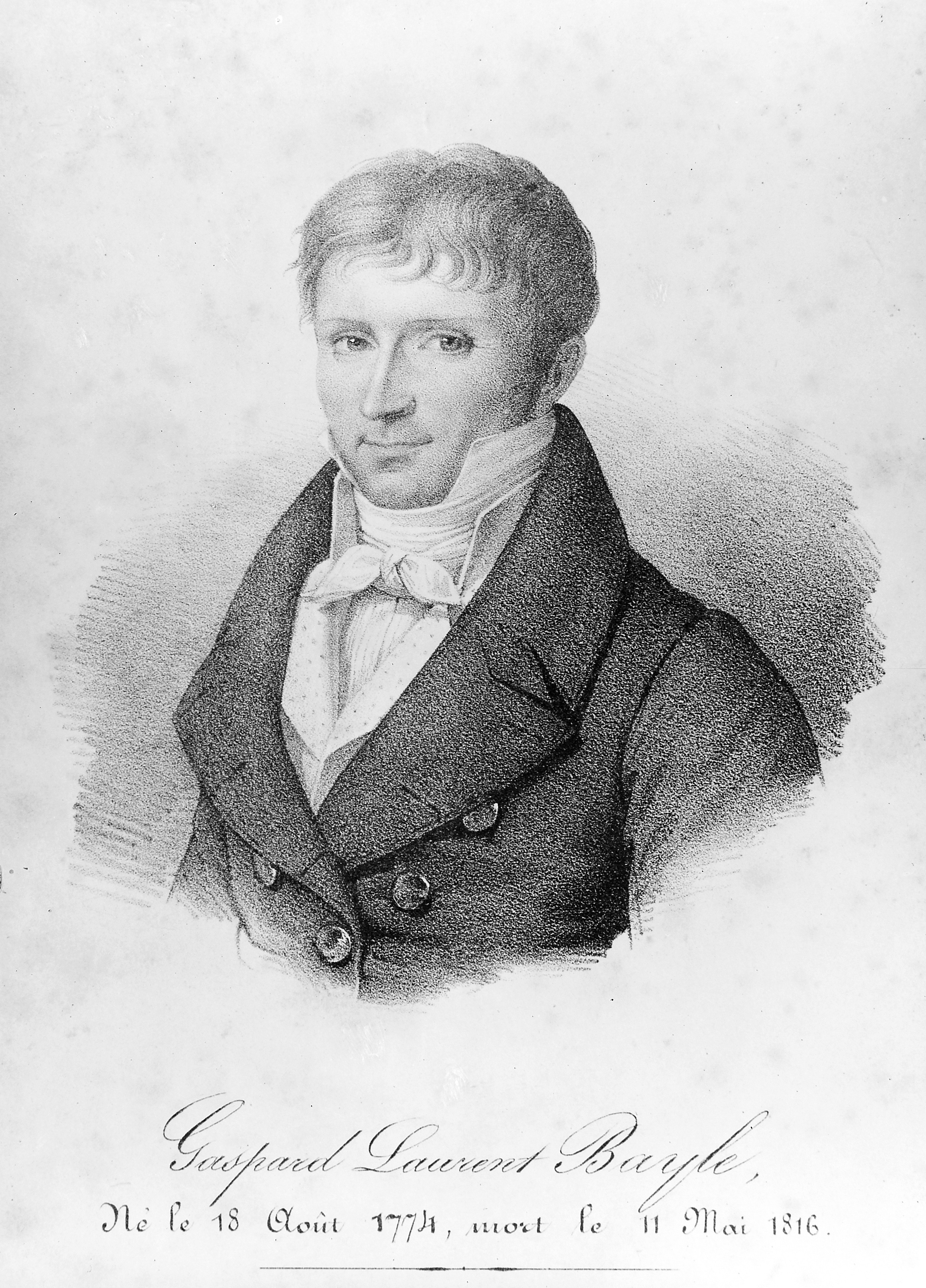
Gaspard Laurent Bayle

Gaspard Laurent Bayle (18 August 1774, Le Vernet, Alpes-de-Haute-Provence – 1816) was a French physician.

He studied medicine under Jean-Nicolas Corvisart (1755–1821) and was a colleague of René Laennec (1781–1826). Beginning in 1805 he practised medicine at the Hôpital de la Charité in Paris. He was an uncle to physician Antoine Laurent Bayle (1799–1859).

Bayle is remembered for his extensive work in pathological anatomy, with contributions to research into cancer and tuberculosis. As the result of 900 post-mortem investigations, he described six different types of tuberculosis — ulcerous phthisis, calculous phthisis, cancerous phthisis, tubercular phthisis, glandular phthisis, and phthisis with melanosis.

His best known written work was the 1810 Recherches sur la phthisie pulmonaire (Research on Pulmonary Tuberculosis). He also penned a treatise on cancerous diseases Traité des maladies cancéreuses, published posthumously (1833) by his nephew, Antoine Laurent Bayle.

== Bibliography ==
- Heirs of Hippocrates Gaspard Laurent Bayle
- (French biography of Gaspard Laurent Bayle, translated by Google)
