= Posterity (play) =

2015 play by Doug Wright

- Original language: English
- Written by: Doug Wright
- Subject: sculpting, legacy, art, death
- Genre: Drama
- Setting: 1901 Norway

Premiere
- Date: 25 February 2015
- Place: Atlantic Theatre Company
- Directed by: Doug Wright

Posterity is a 2015 play written and directed by the Pulitzer Prize-award-winning American playwright Doug Wright. The play focuses on the 1901 encounters between Norwegian sculptor Gustav Vigeland and famed playwright Henrik Ibsen, when the latter sat for a series of sessions to have his bust sculpted. It premiered off-Broadway at the Atlantic Theatre Company's Linda Gross Theater

== Summary ==
Norway's most celebrated sculptor Gustav Vigeland (Linklater) is commissioned to create the last official portrait of the country's most famous writer, but Henrik Ibsen (Noble) proves to be an irascible, contentious sitter, as the two men wage war over both his legacy and his likeness.

== Cast ==
Character	Atlantic Theatre Company 2015
Gustav Vigeland	Hamish Linklater
Henrik Ibsen	John Noble
Greta Bergstrom	Dale Soules
Sophus Larpent	Henry Stram
Anfinn Beck	Mickey Theis

== Productions ==
The production premiered at the Atlantic Theatre Company's Linda Gross Theatre in 2015 running from February 25 through April 5.

== Reception ==
=== Critical reception ===
Critical reception for the play was mostly positive with some mixed reviews. David Cote of Time Out New York praised Wright in particular writing, "[He] makes ideas dance and grounds them in rich, feeling characters. Like a good sculptor, he makes dense material breathe true. Wright directs with a nice balance of pomp and earthy sass". The Hollywood Reporter praised Wright for his writing declaring "[it's] undeniably smart in a historically educational sort of way, and the insightful dialogue illuminates both main characters" but criticized his direction describing it as "staging is self-indulgent to the point of tedium. But he has elicited fine performances from the two leads".
