= Quills (film) =

2000 film

- Theatrical release poster
- Directed by: Philip Kaufman
- Screenplay by: Doug Wright
- Based on: Quills by Doug Wright
- Produced by: Julia Chasman; Peter Kaufman; Nick Wechsler
- Starring: Geoffrey Rush; Kate Winslet; Joaquin Phoenix; Michael Caine
- Cinematography: Rogier Stoffers
- Edited by: Peter Boyle
- Music by: Stephen Warbeck
- Production companies: Fox Searchlight Pictures; Industry Entertainment; Walrus & Associates
- Distributed by: Fox Searchlight Pictures
- Release dates: 2 September 2000 (Telluride); 22 November 2000 (United States); 15 December 2000 (United Kingdom); 10 February 2001 (BIFF); 8 March 2001 (Germany)
- Running time: 124 minutes
- Countries: United States; United Kingdom; Germany
- Languages: English; Latin
- Budget: $13.5 million
- Box office: $18 million

Quills is a 2000 historical drama film directed by Philip Kaufman and adapted from the Obie award-winning 1995 play by Doug Wright, who also wrote the original screenplay. Inspired by the life of the Marquis de Sade, the film re-imagines the last years of the Marquis's incarceration in the insane asylum at Charenton. It stars Geoffrey Rush as de Sade, Kate Winslet as laundress Madeleine "Maddie" LeClerc, Joaquin Phoenix as the Abbé de Coulmier, and Michael Caine as Dr. Royer-Collard.

Well received by critics, Quills garnered acclaim for its performances from Rush and Winslet and for its screenplay. The film received nominations for three Academy Awards, four BAFTA Awards, two Golden Globe Awards, and two Screen Actors Guild Awards. The National Board of Review named it the Best Film of 2000. The Writers Guild of America awarded Doug Wright with the Paul Selvin Award.

The film was a modest art house success, averaging $27,709 per screen its debut weekend, and eventually grossing $17,989,277 internationally. Noted for its artistic licenses, Quills filmmakers and writers said they were not making a biography of de Sade, but exploring issues such as censorship, pornography, sex, art, mental illness, and religion.

== Plot ==
In Paris, the incarcerated Marquis de Sade is confined to the asylum at Charenton, overseen by the Abbé du Coulmier. The Marquis has been publishing his work through laundress Madeleine "Maddy" LeClerc, who smuggles manuscripts through an anonymous horseman to a publisher. The Marquis's latest work, Justine, is published on the black market to great success. Emperor Napoléon I Bonaparte orders all copies burned and the author shot, but his advisor, Delbené, suggests another idea: send Dr. Royer-Collard to silence the Marquis. Meanwhile, the Abbé teaches Madeleine to read and write.

Dr. Royer-Collard later arrives. The Abbé rejects Royer-Collard's offers of aggressive archaic "treatments" and speaks with the Marquis himself, who swears obedience. Royer-Collard then travels to the Panthemont Convent in Paris to retrieve his promised bride, the underage Simone. They are given a run-down chateau by the Emperor, with a young architect, Prouix, on hand for its renovation.

The hasty marriage incites much gossip at the asylum, prompting the Marquis to write a farce to be performed at a public exhibition. The audacious play, titled "The Crimes of Love", is interrupted when the inmate Bouchon molests Madeleine off-stage, prompting her to hit him in the face with an iron. Royer-Collard shuts down the public theater and demands that the Abbé do more to control the Marquis. Infuriated, the Abbé confiscates the Marquis's quills and ink, prompting more subversive behavior, including a story written in wine on bedsheets and in blood on clothing. The Marquis is eventually left naked in an empty cell. A maid reveals that Madeleine has been helping the Marquis. Madeleine is whipped on the order of Royer-Collard until the Abbé stops him by offering himself instead and declaring that she will be sent away. That night, she visits the Abbé's chamber to beg him to reconsider sending her away and confesses her love for him in the process, prompting him to kiss her. However, he abruptly breaks away.

Meanwhile, Royer-Collard rapes Simone on their wedding night, and keeps her as a virtual prisoner. She purchases a copy of Justine, seduces Prioux, and the lovers run off together. She leaves behind a letter explaining her actions and her copy of Justine. Upon finding this, Royer-Collard seizes on the Marquis as the source of his troubles and embarks upon a quest for revenge.

About to be sent away from Charenton, Madeleine begs a last story from the Marquis, which is to be relayed to her through the asylum patients. Bouchon, the inmate at the end of the relay, is excited by the story, breaks out of his cell, and kills Madeleine. The asylum is set afire by the pyromaniac Dauphin and the inmates break out of their cells.

Madeleine's body is found by her blind mother and the Abbé in the laundry vat. Bouchon is captured and imprisoned inside an iron dummy. The Abbé blames the Marquis for Madeleine's death and prods him into a fury. The Marquis claims that he had been with Madeleine in every way imaginable, only to be told that she died a virgin. The Abbé cuts out the Marquis's tongue as punishment. The Abbé then has a dream in which he has sex with Madeline's corpse. The Marquis's health declines, but he perseveres, decorating his oubliette with a story, using feces as ink. As the Marquis lies dying, the Abbé reads him the last rites and offers him a crucifix to kiss. The Marquis defiantly swallows the crucifix and chokes to death on it.

A year later, the new Abbé arrives at Charenton and is given the grand tour. The asylum has been converted into a print shop, with the inmates as its staff. The books being printed are the works of the Marquis. At the end of the tour, the new Abbé meets his predecessor, who resides in the Marquis's old cell. Yearning to write, he begs paper and a quill from the new Abbé, who is herded off by Royer-Collard, now overseer of the asylum. However, the peephole opens, and Madeleine's mother thrusts paper, quill, and ink through. The Abbé begins to scribble furiously, with the Marquis providing the narration.

== Cast ==
- Geoffrey Rush as the Marquis de Sade; Director Philip Kaufman encouraged Rush to portray the Marquis as something of a dissolute rock star holed up in the Ritz Carlton. Rush used Francine du Plessix Gray's 1998 biography At Home with the Marquis de Sade: A Life as a reference and had previously acted in a production of Marat/Sade.
- Kate Winslet as Madeleine "Maddy" LeClerc; Screenwriter Doug Wright called Winslet the "patron saint" of the movie for being the first big name to back it, expressing interest as early as April 1999.
- Joaquin Phoenix as the Abbé du Coulmier; Before settling on Phoenix, casting directors considered Jude Law, Guy Pearce, and Billy Crudup for the role.
- Michael Caine as Dr. Royer-Collard; Kaufman drew comparisons between Royer-Collard and Kenneth Starr, particularly the publication of de Sade's works at the Charenton Printing Press and the release of Starr's report online.
- Billie Whitelaw as Madame LeClerc
- Stephen Marcus as Bouchon
- Amelia Warner as Simone
- Stephen Moyer as Prioux
- Jane Menelaus as Renée Pelagie
- Ron Cook as Napoléon I Bonaparte
- Patrick Malahide as Delbené
- Elizabeth Berrington as Charlotte
- Tony Pritchard as Valcour
- Michael Jenn as Cleante
- Edward Tudor-Pole as Franval

== Production ==
The interior set of Charenton was built at Pinewood Studios, where most of the filming took place. Oxfordshire, Bedfordshire, and London stood in for the exterior shots of early 19th century France. Production designer Martin Childs imagined the primary location of Charenton as an airy, though circuitous place, darkening as Royer-Collard takes over operations. The screenplay specifies the way the inmates' rooms link together, which plays a key role in the relay of the Marquis's climactic story to Madeleine. Screenwriter/playwright Doug Wright was a constant presence on set, assisting the actors and producers in interpreting the script and bringing his vision to life. Casting directors Donna Isaacson and Priscilla John recruited a number of actors from a disabled actor's company to play the parts of many of the inmates at Charenton.

Costume designer Jacqueline West created the intricate period costumes, using each character as inspiration. West previously worked with director Philip Kaufman on his crime drama Rising Sun. For Joaquin Phoenix's Abbé, costumers designed special "pleather" clogs to accommodate the actor's veganism. In one scene, Rush's Marquis de Sade wears a suit decorated in bloody script, which West described as "challenging" to make. It features actual writings of de Sade and costumers planned exactly where each sentence should go on the fabric. Before production began, West gave Winslet a copy of French painter Léopold Boilly's "Woman Ironing" to give her a feel for the character, which Winslet said greatly influenced her performance.

== Music ==
The Quills soundtrack was released by RCA Victor on 21 November 2000 featuring the music of Oscar-winning composer Stephen Warbeck (Shakespeare in Love). Featuring experimental instrumentation on such instruments as the serpent, the mediaeval shawm, and the bucket, most reviewers were intrigued by the unconventional and thematic score. Cinemusic.net reviewer Ryan Keaveney called the album a "macabre masterpiece", with an "addicting and mesmerizing" sound. Urban Cinephile contributor Brad Green described the album as a "hedonistic pleasure" that "captures the spirit of an incorrigible, perverse genius." Soundtrack.net's Glenn McClanan disliked the "lack of unifying unified themes and motifs" that may have served each individual scene, but made the film feel "incoherent."

Track listing

1. "The Marquis and the Scaffold" – 3:08
2. "The Abbe and Madeleine" – 2:19
3. "The Convent" – 2:22
4. "Plans for a Burial" – 1:18
5. "Dream of Madeleine" – 4:42
6. "Royer-Collard and Bouchon" – 4:15
7. "Aphrodisiac" – 2:59
8. "The Last Story" – 7:35
9. "The Marquis' Cell at Charenton" – 4:38
10. "The End: A New Manuscript" – 7:32
11. "The Printing Press" – 2:22

Though not included on the soundtrack, the opening notes of "Au clair de la lune," a traditional French children's song, recur throughout the film, usually hummed by the Marquis. The song is originally sung by John Hamway during the opening scene of a beheading which was filmed in Oxford. The English translation provides some illumination as to its selection as a theme for the Marquis:

Au Clair de la Lune
The opening notes to the traditional French children's song "Au clair de la lune"

By the light of the moon,
My friend Pierrot,
Lend me your quill,
To write a word.
My candle is dead,
I have no more fire.
Open your door for me
For the love of God.

By the light of the moon,
Pierrot replied:
"I don't have any pens,
I am in my bed
Go to the neighbor's,
I think she's there
Because in her kitchen
Someone is lighting the fire..."

== Release ==
=== Box office ===
Distributed by Fox Searchlight Pictures in 2000, Quills premiered in the United States at the Telluride Film Festival on 2 September 2000. It was given a limited release on 22 November 2000, with a wider release following on 15 December 2000. The film earned $249,383 its opening weekend in nine theaters, totaling $7,065,332 domestically and $10,923,895 internationally, for a total of $17,989,227.

=== Critical reception ===
The film holds a 75% "fresh" rating at the review aggregator site Rotten Tomatoes, based on 126 reviews, with an average rating of 6.6/10. The site's consensus states: "Though hard to watch, this film's disturbing exploration of freedom of expression is both seductive and thought-provoking." It has an average score of 70/100 at Metacritic, based on 31 reviews, indicating "generally favorable reviews."

Elvis Mitchell of The New York Times complimented the "euphoric stylishness" of Kaufman's direction and Geoffrey Rush's "gleeful... flamboyant" performance. Peter Travers for Rolling Stone wrote about the "exceptional" actors, particularly Geoffrey Rush's "scandalously good" performance as the Marquis, populating a film that is "literate, erotic, and spoiling to be heard." Stephanie Zacharek of Salon.com enthused over the "delectable and ultimately terrifying fantasy" of Quills, with Rush as "sun king", enriched by a "luminous" supporting cast.

In a December 2000 review, film critic Roger Ebert, rated it 3.5 stars out of 4 and stated, "The message of 'Quills' is perhaps that we are all expressions of our natures, and to live most successfully we must understand that."

The film was not without its detractors, including Richard Schickel of Time magazine, who decried director Philip Kaufman's approach as "brutally horrific, vulgarly unamusing," creating a film that succeeds only as "soft-gore porn." Kenneth Turan of the Los Angeles Times dismissed the picture as an "overripe contrivance masquerading as high art," while de Sade biographer Neil Schaeffer in The Guardian criticized it for historical inaccuracies and for simplifying de Sade's complex life.

== Awards and nominations ==
Year	Award	Category	Nominee	Result	Ref
2000	Academy Award	Best Actor	Geoffrey Rush	Nominated	
2000	Academy Award	Best Art Direction	Art: Martin Childs, Sets: Jill Quertier	Nominated	
2000	Academy Award	Best Costume Design	Jacqueline West	Nominated	
2000	BAFTA Awards	Best Actor in a Leading Role	Geoffrey Rush	Nominated	
2000	BAFTA Awards	Best Production Design	Martin Childs	Nominated	
2000	BAFTA Awards	Best Costume Design	Jacqueline West	Nominated	
2000	BAFTA Awards	Best Makeup and Hair	Peter Swords King and Nuala Conway	Nominated	
2000	Golden Globe Award	Best Actor in a Motion Picture Drama	Geoffrey Rush	Nominated	
2000	Golden Globe Award	Best Screenplay	Doug Wright	Nominated	
2000	Screen Actors Guild Awards	Outstanding Actor in a Leading Role	Geoffrey Rush	Nominated	
2000	Screen Actors Guild Awards	Outstanding Actress in a Supporting Role	Kate Winslet	Nominated	
2000	National Board of Review	Best Film	Quills	Won	
2000	Writers Guild of America Award	Paul Selvin Award	Doug Wright	Won	

== Artistic licenses ==
Neil Schaeffer, detailed a number of disparities between fact and film. Schaeffer, whose The Marquis de Sade: A Life was used by Director Philip Kaufman as reference, in a review published in The Guardian, criticised the film for historical inaccuracies and for simplifying de Sade's complex life.

Schaeffer relates that de Sade's initial incarceration "had nothing to do with his writing" but with sexual scandals involving servants, prostitutes, and his sister-in-law. He also criticised the opening scene's implication that the reign of terror caused the "sanguinary streak" of de Sade's writing, when "his bloodiest and best work, The 120 Days of Sodom, was written in the Bastille – obviously before the revolution" and not at Charenton, as suggested by the film. In contrast to the film, the historical de Sade was "not at the height of his literary career nor of his literary powers" while at Charenton, nor did he cut the "tall, trim figure of the Australian actor Geoffrey Rush" but was of middling height and, at the time, of a "considerable, even a grotesque, obesity."

The manuscripts smuggled out of the asylum were not the novel Justine, which features prominently in the film but was published thirteen years before de Sade's incarceration at the asylum. De Sade's smuggled works were not particularly outrageous, mostly consisting of conventional novels and a number of plays he worked on throughout his life in hopes of having them performed. Most of these were soundly rejected by publishers. De Sade was, in fact, involved in the theater productions at Charenton, though none like the play featured in Quills. The plays performed were popular, conventional Parisian dramas, these productions were also the inspiration for the 1963 play and 1967 film Marat/Sade. The government shut the Charenton theater down on 6 May 1813, years before the real Dr. Royer-Collard had any influence at Charenton.

Schaeffer criticised also the film's treatment of de Sade's personal relations regarding his wife (who had formally separated from him after the revolution), the chambermaid (who did not serve as a liaison to a publisher but with whom he had a sexual relationship from her early teens until shortly before his death), and his "companion of many years" who had a room at Charenton (and actually smuggled out the manuscripts) but is ignored by the film. Furthermore, "De Sade's hideous death in the movie is nothing like the truth, for he died in his sleep, in his 74th year, as peacefully as any good Christian."

According to Kaufman, Doug Wright did not have the rights to the original translations and therefore had to create and write the passages of de Sade's work that are included in the original play and the film. He applied the vocabulary used in the translations to the passages to imitate de Sade's style but the archaic language comes across as funny to a modern viewer whereas in the 1700s, as stated by Kaufman, these words were "incendiary."

== Bibliography ==
- Sanello, Frank (2002). Reel V. Real: How Hollywood Turns Facts into Fiction. Taylor Trade Publishing. ISBN 978-0-87833-268-7.
