= Sompuis =

- Commune
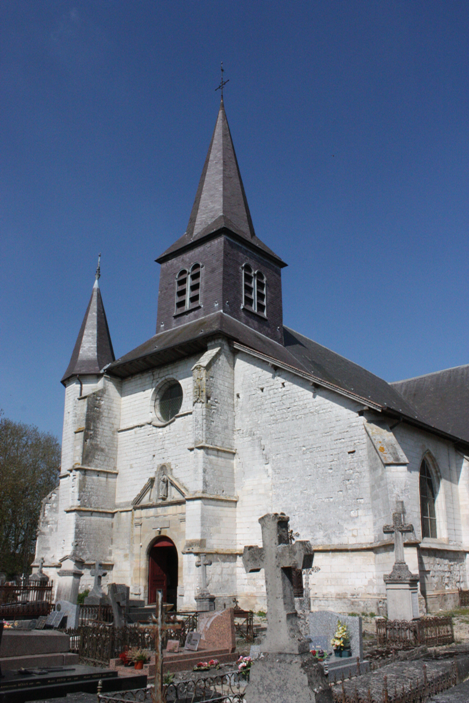
- The church in Sompuis

- Coat of arms
- Location of Sompuis
- Location within France Location within Grand Est
- Coordinates: 48°40′57″N 4°22′48″E
- Country: France
- Region: Grand Est
- Department: Marne
- Arrondissement: Vitry-le-François
- Canton: Vitry-le-François-Champagne et Der
- Intercommunality: CC Vitry, Champagne et Der

Government
  - Mayor (2020–2026): Eric Chaverou
- Area^{1}: 43.82 km^{2} (16.92 sq mi)
- Elevation: 148 m (486 ft)
- Population (2023): 258
  - Density: 5.89/km^{2} (15.2/sq mi)
- Time zone: UTC+01:00 (CET)
  - Summer (DST): UTC+02:00 (CEST)
- INSEE/Postal code: 51550 /51320
- ^{1} French Land Register data, which excludes lakes, ponds, glaciers > 1 km^{2} (0.386 sq mi or 247 acres) and river estuaries.

Sompuis (French pronunciation: [sɔ̃pɥi]) is a commune in the Marne department in north-eastern France.

== See also ==
- Communes of the Marne department
