= Doug Wright =

American playwright and screenwriter (born 1962)

- Born: December 20, 1962 (age 63); Dallas, Texas, U.S.
- Education: Yale University (BA); New York University (MFA)
- Occupations: Playwright, librettist, screenwriter
- Spouse: David Clement
- Writing career
- Notable awards: Pulitzer Prize for Drama (2004)

Douglas Wright (born December 20, 1962) is an American playwright, librettist, and screenwriter. Known for his extensive work in the American theatre in both plays and musicals, he has received numerous accolades including the Pulitzer Prize and a Tony Award.

Wright first earned acclaim earning the Obie Award for Best Playwright for his darkly satirical play Quills (1995), about the final days of the French sadist and author Marquis de Sade. He later adapted it into the 2000 film of the same name, earning a nomination for the Golden Globe Award for Best Screenplay. He went on to receive the Pulitzer Prize for Drama and the Tony Award for Best Play for his debut Broadway play, I Am My Own Wife (2004).

Wright earned a Tony Award for Best Book of a Musical nomination for Grey Gardens (2006), based on the 1975 documentary of the same name. He continued writing for musical theatre, adapting the books for the Broadway musicals The Little Mermaid (2007), Hands on a Hard Body (2012), and War Paint (2017). He returned to plays, authoring Posterity (2015) for off-Broadway, and Good Night, Oscar (2023) for Broadway. He wrote the screenplay for the Amazon Prime legal drama film The Burial (2023).

== Early years and education ==
Wright was born in Dallas, Texas. He attended and graduated from Highland Park High School, a suburb of Dallas, Texas, where he excelled in the theater department and was President of the Thespian Club in 1981. He earned his bachelor's degree from Yale University in 1985. He earned his Master of Fine Arts from New York University.

== Career ==
=== 1995–2003: Quills and I Am My Own Wife ===
Wright's play Quills premiered at the Off-Broadway at New York Theatre Workshop followed by a run at Washington, D.C.'s Woolly Mammoth Theatre Company in 1995. The play recounts the imagined final days in the life of the Marquis de Sade. Quills garnered the 1995 Joseph Kesselring Prize for Best New American Play from the National Arts Club and, for Wright, a 1996 Village Voice Obie Award for Outstanding Achievement in Playwriting. In 2000, Wright wrote the screenplay for the film version of Quills which was directed by Philip Kaufman and starred Geoffrey Rush, Kate Winslet, Joaquin Phoenix, and Michael Caine. The production earned positive reviews with Variety film critic Todd McCarthy writing, "Kaufman‘s intelligently boisterous screen version of Doug Wright‘s successful play...maintains a sharp focus on the notorious writer’s compulsive creativity" adding, "Wright’s script is at its best when centered on the Marquis". For his work Wright received a nomination for the Golden Globe Award for Best Screenplay as well as the Writers Guild of America's Paul Selvin Award.

Wright's I Am My Own Wife was produced Off-Broadway by Playwrights Horizons in 2003. It transferred to Broadway where it won the Tony Award for Best Play, as well as the Pulitzer Prize for Drama. The subject of this one-person play, which starred Jefferson Mays, is the German transvestite Charlotte von Mahlsdorf. With his play I Am My Own Wife, Wright tied in with the film I Am My Own Woman by avant-garde director Rosa von Praunheim (1992).

=== 2006–2017: Focus in musical theatre ===
Wright returned to Broadway in 2006, writing the book for Grey Gardens, starring Christine Ebersole and Mary Louise Wilson. The musical is based on the Maysles brothers' 1975 film documentary of the same title about Edith Ewing Bouvier Beale ("Big Edie") and her daughter Edith Bouvier Beale ("Little Edie"), Jacqueline Kennedy Onassis's aunt and cousin. For his work he received a Tony Award for Best Book of a Musical nomination. He then adapted the Disney film The Little Mermaid for the Broadway musical, which opened in 2007.

In 2009, he was commissioned by the La Jolla Playhouse to adapt and direct Creditors by August Strindberg. In another La Jolla commission, he wrote the book for the musical Hands on a Hardbody, with the score by Amanda Green and Trey Anastasio. The musical had a brief run on Broadway in March and April 2013 after premiering at the La Jolla Playhouse in 2012. As an ardent supporter for writers' rights in the theatre industry, he is a member of the Dramatists Guild of America and was formerly the elected president of the non-profit organization, succeeded in 2021 by Amanda Green (the first woman to hold the role in the Guild's history). Wright also serves on the board of New York Theatre Workshop. He serves on the boards of Yaddo and New York Theatre Workshop. He is a recipient of the William L. Bradley Fellowship at Yale University, the Charles MacArthur Fellowship at the Eugene O'Neill Theater Center, an HBO Fellowship in playwriting and the Alfred Hodder Fellowship at Princeton University. In 2010 he was named a United States Artists Fellow.

He wrote the book for the musical, War Paint, about Helena Rubinstein and Elizabeth Arden. The music is by Scott Frankel and the lyrics by Michael Korie. War Paint premiered at the Goodman Theatre, Chicago, from June 28 to August 14, 2016, with stars Patti LuPone as Helena Rubinstein and Christine Ebersole as Elizabeth Arden. It ran on Broadway in 2017. The musical received four Tony Award nominations for Ebersole, LuPone, set design, and costume design.

=== 2021–present: Good Night, Oscar ===
For television, Wright worked on four pilots for producer Norman Lear and teleplays for Hallmark Entertainment and HBO. In film, Wright's credits include screenplays for Fine Line Features, Fox Searchlight, and DreamWorks SKG. He wrote screenplay for the upcoming courtroom drama The Burial (2023) directed by Maggie Betts starring Jamie Foxx and Tommy Lee Jones. Also in 2023, Doug wrote the play Good Night, Oscar a drama centered around pianist and actor Oscar Levant's appearance on The Tonight Show with Jack Paar. The play starred Sean Hayes and premiered at the Goodman Theatre in Chicago before making its transfer to Broadway. The production earned three Tony Award nominations for Best Actor in a Play (Hayes), Best Scenic Design of a Play and Best Costume Design of a Play.

== Personal life ==
Wright lives in New York City with his husband, singer/songwriter David Clement.

== Work ==
=== Theatre ===
Year	Title	Role	Venue	Ref.
1995	Quills	Playwright	New York Theatre Workshop, Off-Broadway	
1995	Watbanaland	Playwright	Woolly Mammoth, Washington, D.C.	
2003	I Am My Own Wife	Playwright	Playwrights Horizons, Off-Broadway; Lyceum Theatre, Broadway	
2006	Grey Gardens	Book by	Walter Kerr Theatre, Broadway	
2007	The Little Mermaid	Book by	Lunt-Fontanne Theatre, Broadway	
2012	Hands on a Hardbody	Book by	Brooks Atkinson Theatre, Broadway	
2015	Posterity	Playwright	Atlantic Theatre Company, Off-Broadway	
2016	War Paint	Book by	Goodman Theatre, Chicago	
2017	War Paint	Book by	Nederlander Theatre, Broadway	
2021	Good Night, Oscar	Playwright	Goodman Theatre, Chicago	
2023	Good Night, Oscar	Playwright	Belasco Theatre, Broadway	

=== Film ===
Year	Title	Role	Director	Notes	Ref.
2000	Quills	Screenwriter	Philip Kaufman	Feature film debut	
2023	The Burial	Screenwriter	Maggie Betts		

=== Television ===
Year	Title	Role	Notes	Ref.
2004	Charlie Rose	Himself	Episode: July 30, 2004	
2006	Tony Bennett: An American Classic	Writer	Documentary	
2015	She's The Best Thing in It	Himself	Documentary	

== Awards and honors ==
Year	Award	Category	Nominated work	Result	Ref.
1996	Obie Award	Best Playwriting	Quills	Won	
2001	Golden Globes Awards	Best Screenplay	Quills	Nominated	
2001	Writers Guild of America Award	Paul Selvin Award	Quills	Won	
2001	Los Angeles Film Critics Association	Best Screenplay	Quills	Nominated	
2001	Phoenix Film Critics Society Awards	Best Screenplay	Quills	Nominated	
2001	Satellite Awards	Best Adapted Screenplay	Quills	Won	
2001	Online Film Critics Society	Best Adapted Screenplay	Quills	Nominated	
2004	Lucille Lortel Awards	Outstanding Solo Show	I Am My Own Wife	Won	
2004	Drama Desk Award	Best Play	I Am My Own Wife	Won	
2004	Tony Award	Best Play	I Am My Own Wife	Won	
2004	Pulitzer Prize	Pulitzer Prize for Drama	I Am My Own Wife	Won	
2005	Lambda Literary Award		I Am My Own Wife	Won	
2006	Toleranzpreis Europa		I Am My Own Wife	Won	
2006	Washington D.C. Film Critics Association	Best Adapted Screenplay	Memoirs of a Geisha	Nominated	
2006	Lucille Lortel Awards	Outstanding Musical	Grey Gardens	Nominated	
2006	Drama Desk Award	Outstanding Musical	Grey Gardens	Nominated	
2006	Drama Desk Award	Outstanding Book of a Musical	Grey Gardens	Nominated	
2007	Tony Award	Best Book of a Musical	Grey Gardens	Nominated	
2013	Drama Desk Award	Outstanding Musical	Hands on a Hardbody	Nominated	
2013	Drama Desk Award	Outstanding Book of a Musical	Hands on a Hardbody	Nominated	
2023	Drama League Award	Outstanding Production of a Play	Good Night, Oscar	Nominated	
