= Jacques Simonnet =

M. Jacques Simonnet has been a civil servant in France and its territories for many years. Notably, he served as prefect of Saint-Barthélemy and Saint Martin from July 2009 to 2011.

== Career ==
He served as an officer in the French Army from 1971 to 1995. He became a sub-prefect, 1st class in 1993 and that same year he was named to the National Order of Merit. He worked his way through the French Defence Health Service. In 2002, he was promoted to Sub-Prefect Out of Class. He served as a technical adviser in Mali and, in 2006, became sub-prefect of Arles. He was named prefect of Saint Barthelemy and Saint Martin in 2009.
