= Charenton (asylum) =

Lunatic asylum in France

Coordinates: 48°49′7″N 2°25′47″E

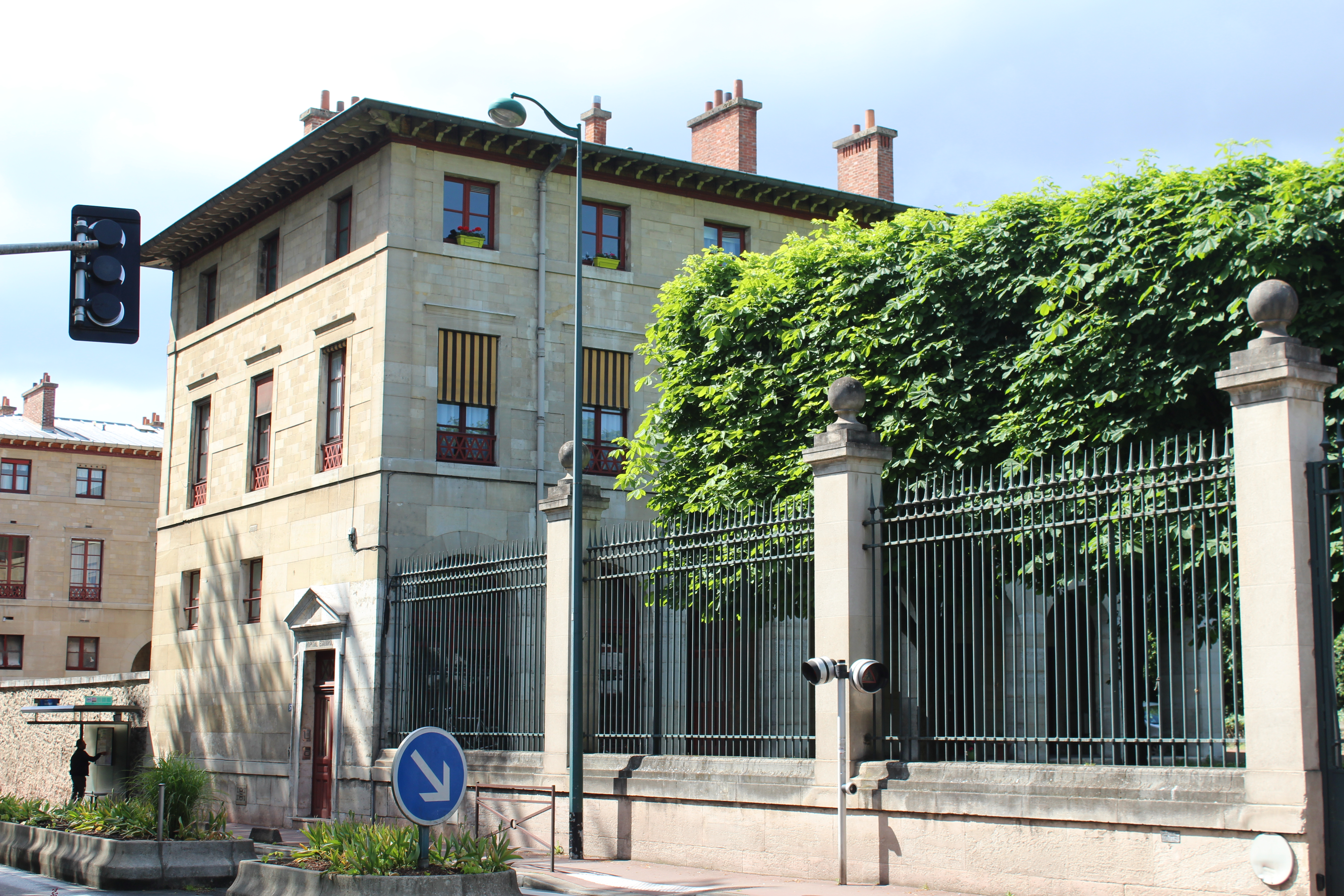
Esquirol Hospital

Charenton was a lunatic asylum founded in 1645 by the Frères de la Charité (Brothers of Charity) in Charenton-Saint-Maurice, now Saint-Maurice, Val-de-Marne, France.

Charenton was first under monastic rule, then Sisters of Charity of St. Vincent de Paul took over the asylum after their founding. Although the town itself was the location of the headquarters of the French Huguenots in the 1500s and 1600s, the founders of Charenton were Catholic. At the time, many hospitals and asylums were Catholic institutions after the Council of Trent and the Counter-Reformation.

Charenton was known for its humanitarian treatment of patients, especially under its director the Abbé de Coulmier in the early 19th century. He showed a remarkable aptitude for understanding Psychoanalytic theory. He used the technique of art therapy to help patients manifest their madness through physical art forms.

Now merged under a new official name with the neighboring general hospital, the psychiatric hospital was known as the Esquirol Hospital (French: l'Hôpital Esquirol or Établissement public de santé Esquirol), after Jean-Étienne Dominique Esquirol who directed the institution in the 19th century. The 1845 structure's architect was Émile Gilbert.

== History ==
Charenton was founded as a hospital for the poor on 13 September 1641 by the Frères de la Charité after receiving a donation from Sébastien Leblanc, an advisor to Louis XIII. Initially the hospital consisted of a single house containing 5 beds. Starting September 1660 the mentally ill were required to be cared for in hospitals as per a government mandate. Care at Charenton shifted to reflect this change, prioritizing care for more privileged members of the population with mental symptoms. Demand for care grew throughout the 18th century and the Frères de la Charité acquired additional land, including the area of Charenton Saint-Maurice, to ensure there was sufficient space for more patients.

In 1804 François Simonnet de Coulmiers became the director of the asylum, which was named the "Maison Nationale de Charenton" at the time. Jean-Étienne Dominique Esquirol became the chief physician of the hospital in 1826.

== Practices ==
Later on in the 18th century, hospitals and asylums shifted away from brutal treatments to more humane solutions, later including psychotherapy.

In 1804, after the Marquis de Sade was transferred from the Bastille, director François Simonnet de Coulmier, a Catholic priest, employed the use of psycho-drama therapy by allowing patients to organize and act in their own plays. Coulmier was known for using this and other forms of psychotherapy rather than the inhumane treatments employed at other facilities to encourage alternative forms of expression. However, his psychodrama therapy came under fire by Esquirol and others who criticized him for employing a fruitless treatment and turning the patients into an exhibit to the public.

Despite the tendency to use more humane therapies, not all patients necessarily lived pleasant lives in the asylum. Hersilie Rouy, a thirty-nine-year old French musician, was admitted to Charenton and complained of the subpar living conditions and "tortuous therapy" that also made women more vulnerable to mismanagement by the institution.

== Famous prisoners ==
Famous prisoners were held in the Charenton asylum including Jean Henri Latude, the Comte de Sanois, and the Marquis de Sade (from 1801 until his death in 1814 at the age of 74). Sade was arrested without a trial and was later transferred to Charenton.

The French Baroque composer Jean-Joseph Mouret was sent to Charenton by order of the king in 1738 and died there a few months later. Pierre Gaveaux was a French operatic tenor and composer who was sent to Charenton in 1819 until his death in 1825. The noted Belgian-born musicologist and composer Jérôme-Joseph de Momigny also died at the Charenton asylum, in 1842. The caricaturist André Gill died there in 1885. Poet Paul Verlaine was interned in 1887 and again in 1890. Artist Charles Meryon died at the asylum in 1868. Composer François Devienne died in the asylum in 1803. The mathematician André Bloch spent the last three decades of his life there, and mathematician Joseph-Émile Barbier also stayed there before being found and brought back into academia by Joseph Bertrand. At the time, many believed that with a degree of insanity came the ability to be more creative and have "access to greater truths."

== Significant physicians of Charenton ==
Antoine Laurent Jessé Bayle was a French physician who practiced at Charenton. In 1822, his research using postmortem evidence concluded that general paresis of the insane, or GPI, resulted from chronic inflammation of a brain area. This challenged the established belief at the time that the mental and physical symptoms, such as paralysis, were present before the inflammation, not as a result of a larger disease.

The physician Jean-Étienne Dominique Esquirol used leeches, tepid baths, emetic purging, laxatives, and exercise at Charenton, in addition to psychotherapy. Louis-Florentin Calmeil, who succeeded Esquirol as director, also used leeching as a way to treat monomania.

== Marat/Sade ==
The Persecution and Assassination of Jean-Paul Marat as Performed by the Inmates of Charenton Under the Direction of the Marquis de Sade, which is usually simplified to Marat/Sade, is a play written by Peter Weiss in which Sade directs a play featuring the inmates as actors. During his time at Charenton, Sade did direct plays at the facility. Marat/Sade depicted the controversy surrounding Sade, in which French officials criticized the asylum for giving him an elevated status though a lunatic and prisoner. These plays were considered a form of treatment thought to help cure patients by opening up new paths for expressing suppressed feelings. Though these treatments were controversial, they spread from Charenton to other asylums in Europe.

The play has been reprised in many forms and forums. The 1967 film adaptation featured many of the original players, and utilized the long version of the play's name in its opening credits, although this was frequently shortened to Marat/Sade in publicity materials. The screenplay was written by Adrian Mitchell. Peter Brook directed a cast that included Ian Richardson, Patrick Magee, Glenda Jackson, Michael Williams, Freddie Jones and Clifford Rose.

== See also ==
- Quills (film), a film set at Charenton and featuring Coulmier and de Sade.

== Gallery ==
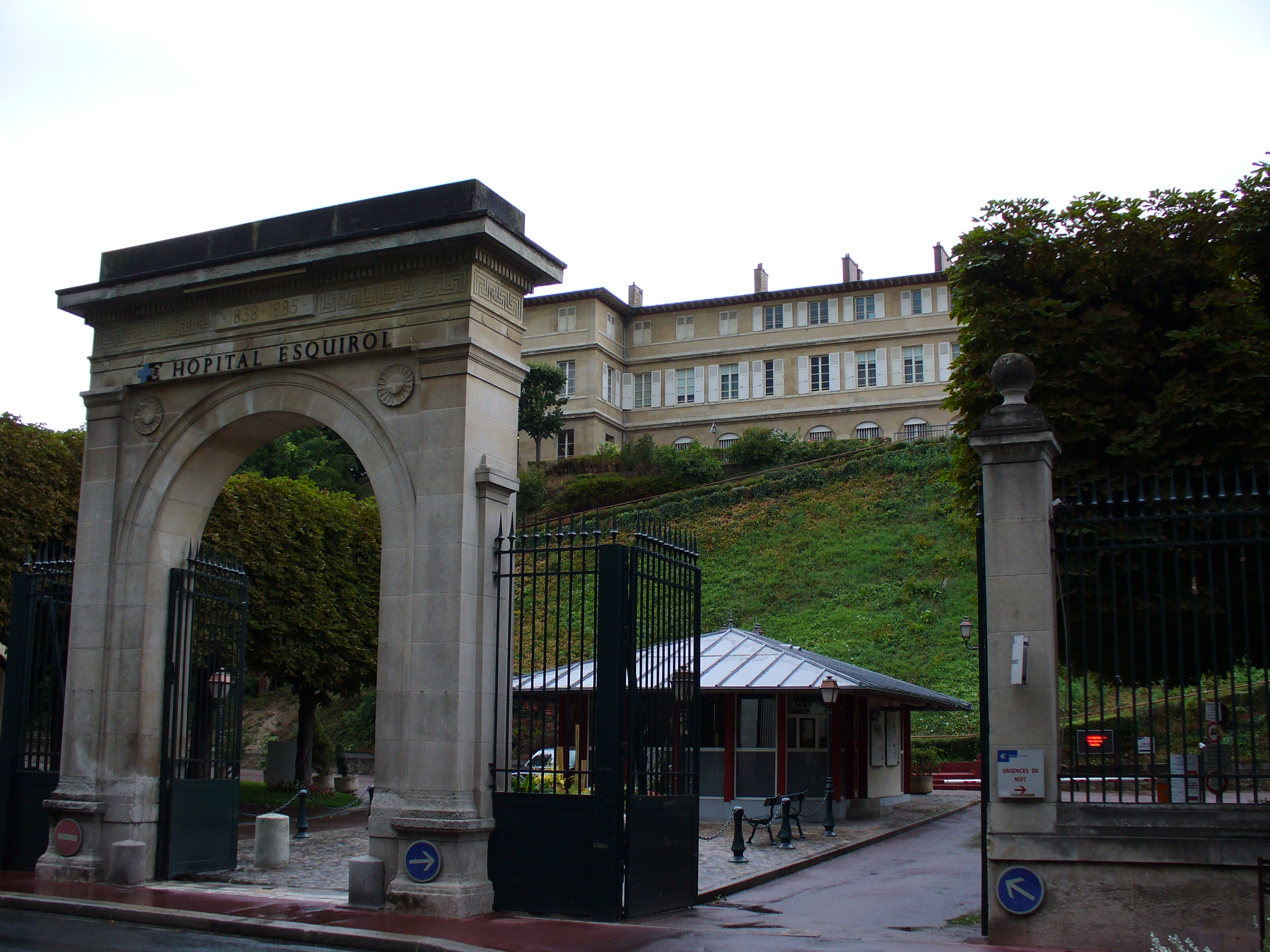
Esquirol Hospital
(19th century)

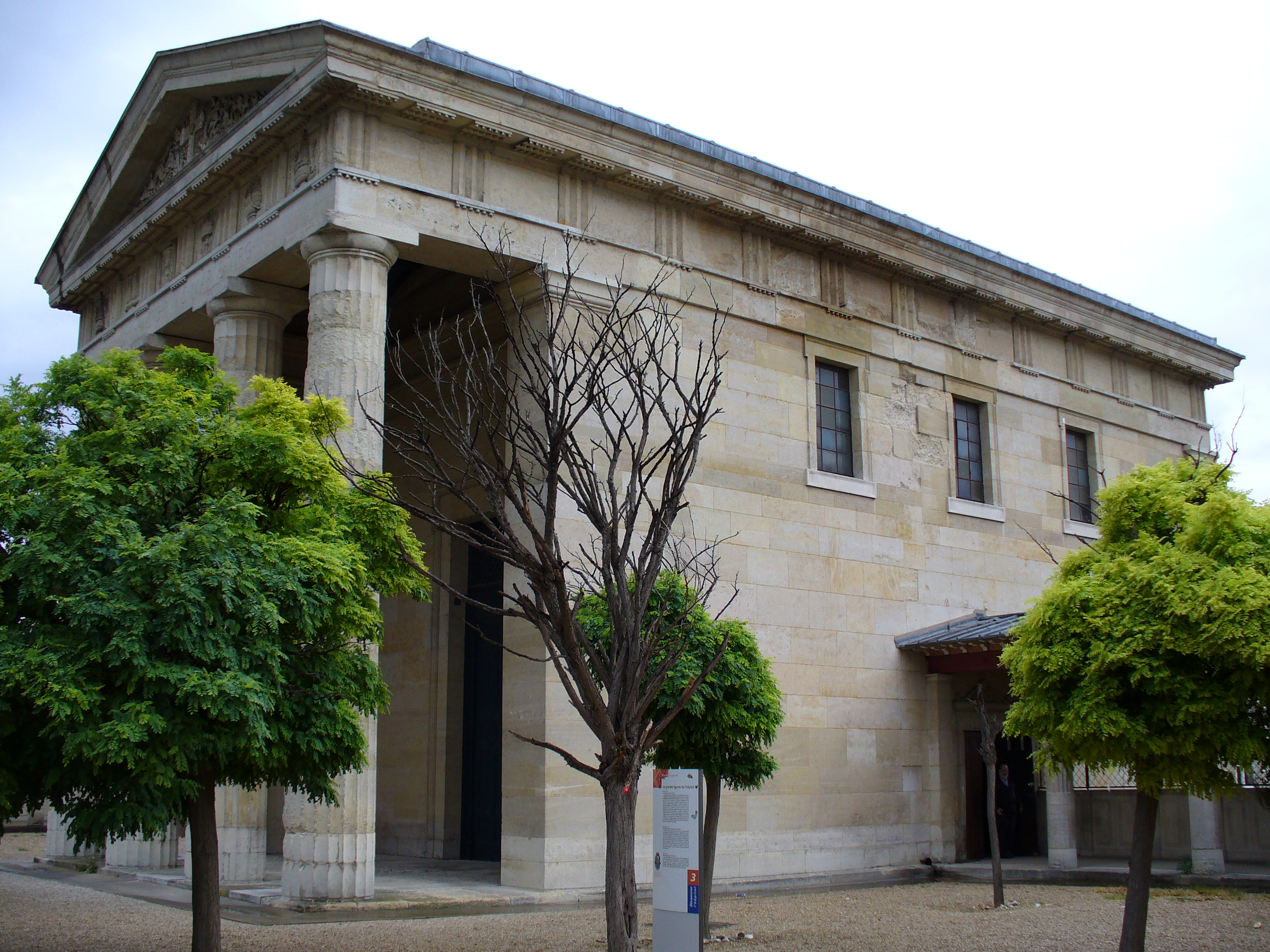
The hospital's chapel
