= Abbé de Coulmier =

French priest and insane asylum director

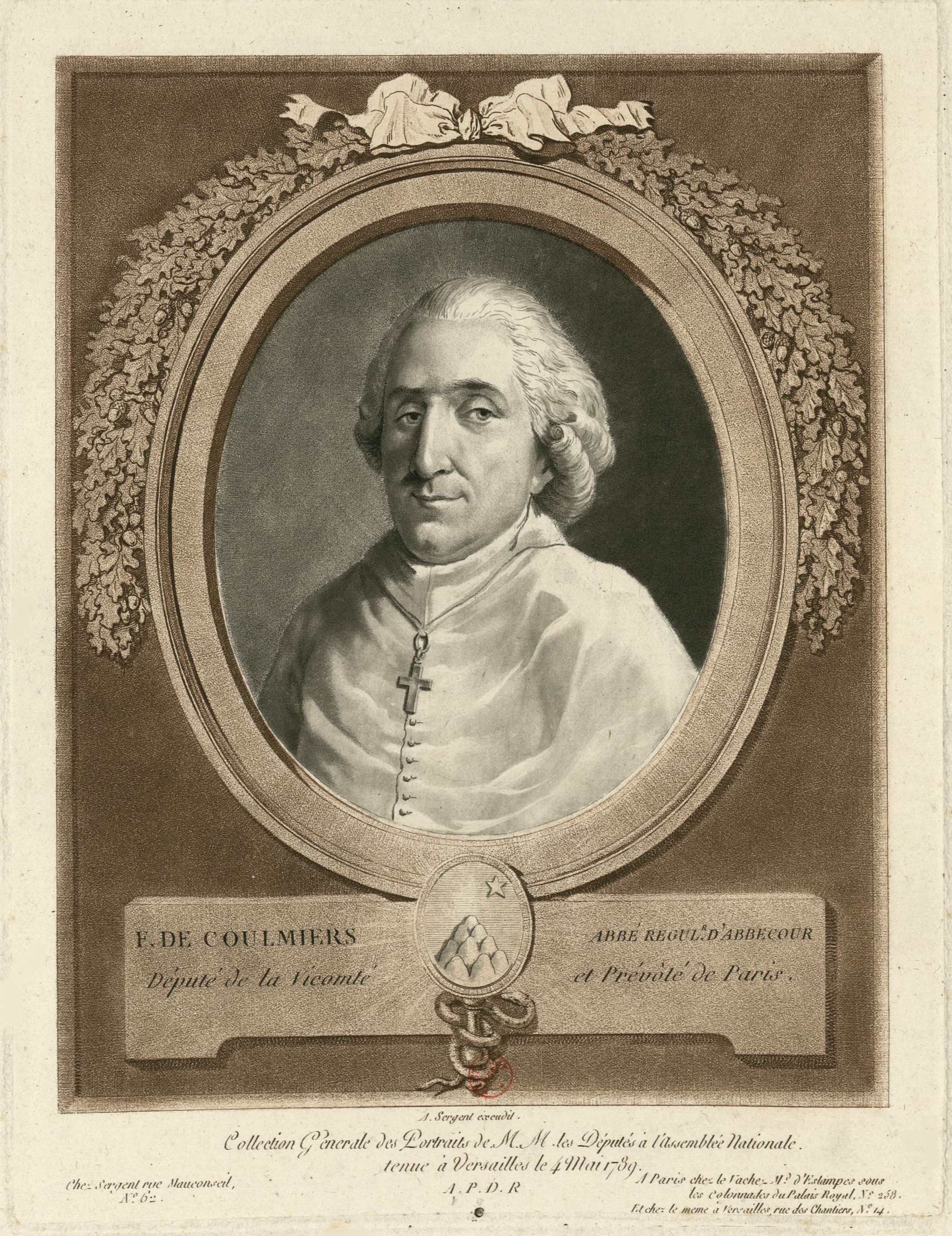
- Born: 30 September 1741
- Died: 4 June 1818 (aged 76)

Signature
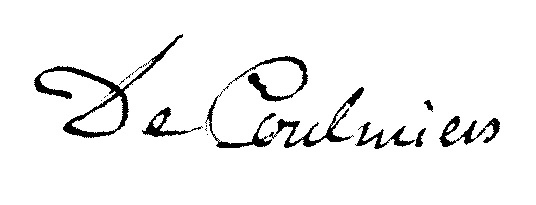

François Simonet de Coulmier (30 September 1741 – 4 June 1818) was a French Catholic priest, originally a member of the Premonstratensian canons regular, and an active member of the French legislature at the start of the French Revolution and again during the First French Empire.

== Life ==
Coulmier was born in Dijon in 1741. While serving as the pastor of Abbeville, he was elected as a representative of the First Estate in the Estates General, later serving in the National Constituent Assembly. It is not clear whether or not he was a part of the juring clergy, who swore to the Civil Constitution of the Clergy. He again served in the French legislature under Napoleon.

After that period, Coulmier became the Director of the Charenton insane asylum, despite his lack of any professional degree in the field of medicine. He was often criticized by the medical establishment for his "overly liberal" methods of treatment, as he favored allowing patients the right to express themselves via art, and discouraged the widespread practices of physical restraint and punishment of asylum patients in that day. He did not believe in many of the treatment practices which are nowadays termed brutal, including locking patients in a wicker cage, as well as the use of straitjackets and dunking. He also employed treatments that at the time were considered quite advanced, including diet, bleeding and purges. After Napoleon's fall and the restoration of the Bourbons, Coulmier was relieved of his duties, probably because of his revolutionary past.

Despite his significant contribution in the field of mental health, today Coulmier is known primarily for his interactions with the Marquis de Sade, having been the asylum director when Sade was institutionalized. Coulmier provided Sade with writing supplies, permitted Sade's wife to live in the asylum, and allowed Sade to produce a play which featured other asylum residents as actors.

== Fictional portrayals ==
In the film Quills, Coulmier was portrayed by Joaquin Phoenix; this drew criticism on the part of historians and disabled activists, as the real Coulmier was extremely short, and has been described as a hunchback. Nor did he end up as a patient in the asylum himself. Coulmier was also represented in Peter Weiss's 1963 play The Persecution and Assassination of Jean-Paul Marat as Performed by the Inmates of the Asylum of Charenton Under the Direction of the Marquis de Sade, and its 1967 film adaptation, Marat/Sade, in which he is portrayed by Clifford Rose, though the character is portrayed as a married bureaucrat, and father of a daughter, instead of a priest.
