= 54th British Academy Film Awards =

2001 film awards ceremony

- Date: 25 February 2001
- Site: Odeon Luxe Leicester Square
- Hosted by: Stephen Fry; Mariella Frostrup

Highlights
- Best Film: Gladiator
- Best British Film: Billy Elliot
- Best Actor: Jamie Bell; Billy Elliot
- Best Actress: Julia Roberts; Erin Brockovich
- Most awards: Crouching Tiger, Hidden Dragon and Gladiator (4)
- Most nominations: Crouching Tiger, Hidden Dragon and Gladiator (14)

The 54th British Academy Film Awards, more commonly known as the BAFTAs, took place on 25 February 2001 at the Odeon Leicester Square in London, honouring the best national and foreign films of 2000. Presented by the British Academy of Film and Television Arts, accolades were handed out for the best feature-length film and documentaries of any nationality that were screened at British cinemas in 2000.

Ridley Scott's Gladiator won Best Film, while Ang Lee won Best Director for Crouching Tiger, Hidden Dragon. Billy Elliot was voted Outstanding British Film of 2000; the film's lead actor, Jamie Bell, won Best Actor in a Leading Role. In addition, Julia Roberts won Best Actress in a Leading Role for her portrayal of Erin Brockovich in Erin Brockovich, Benicio del Toro won Best Actor in a Supporting Role for his role in Traffic, and Julie Walters won Best Actress in a Supporting Role for her role in Billy Elliot. The nominees were announced on 31 January 2001.

Stephen Fry and Mariella Frostrup co-hosted the ceremony together, marking the first time the ceremony had two hosts in over 10 years.

== Winners and nominees ==
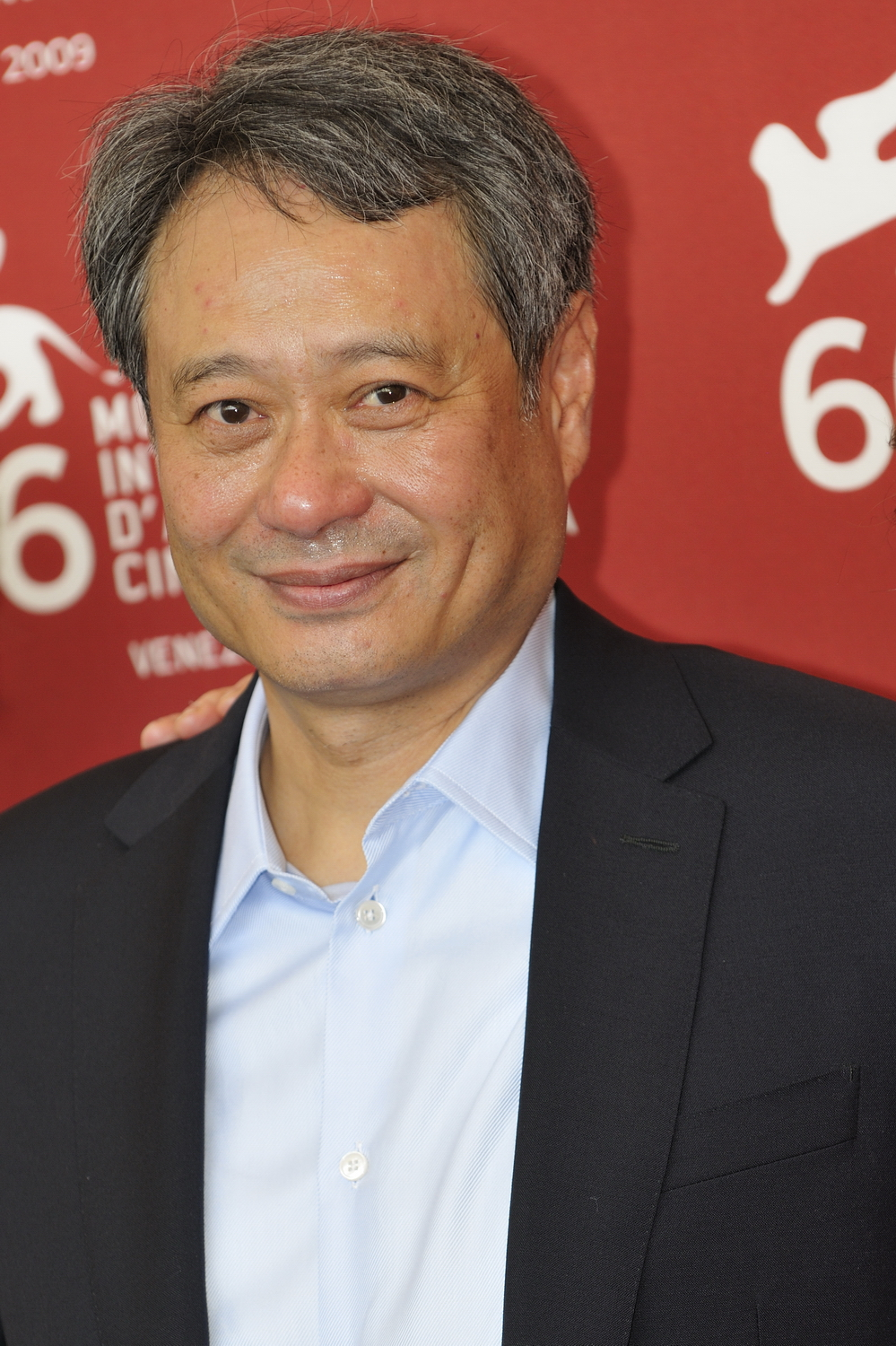
Ang Lee, Best Director winner and Best Film Not in the English Language co-winner

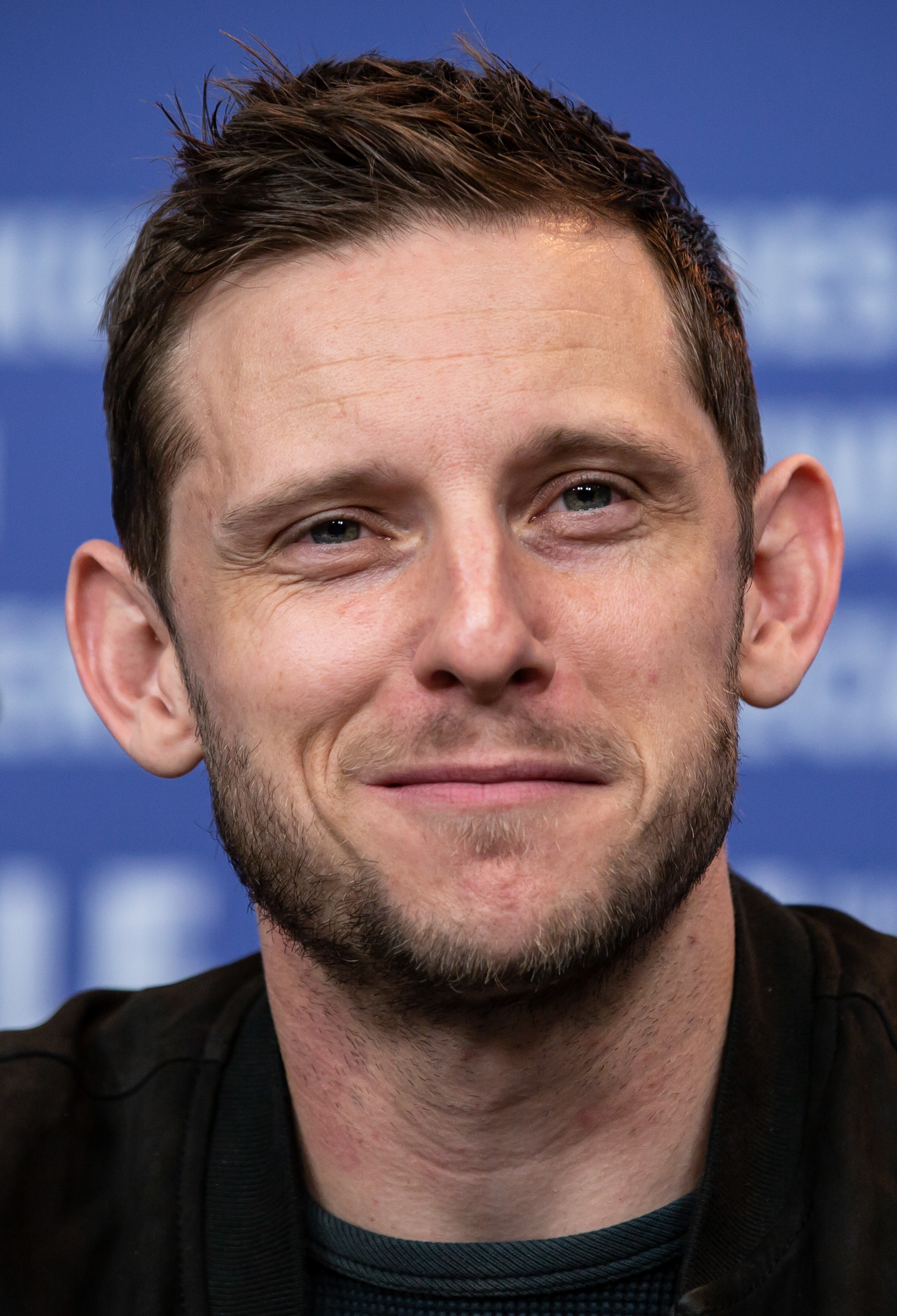
Jamie Bell, Best Actor winner

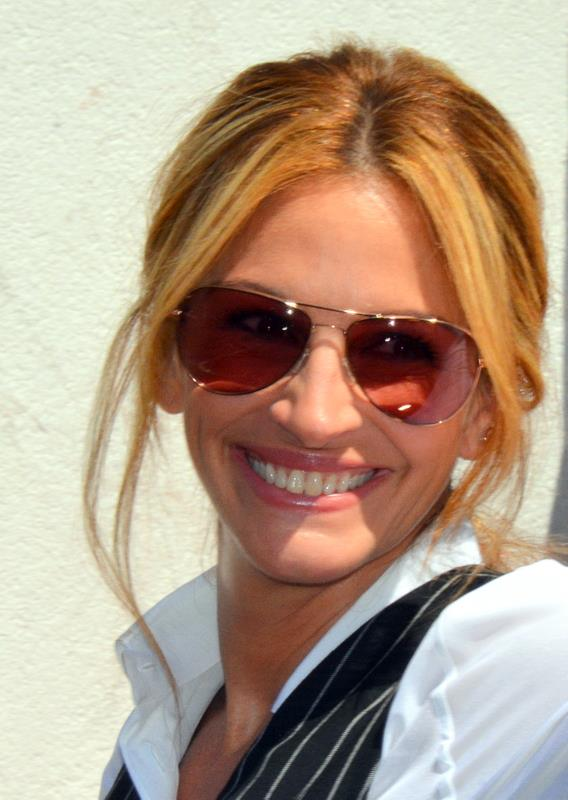
Julia Roberts, Best Actress winner

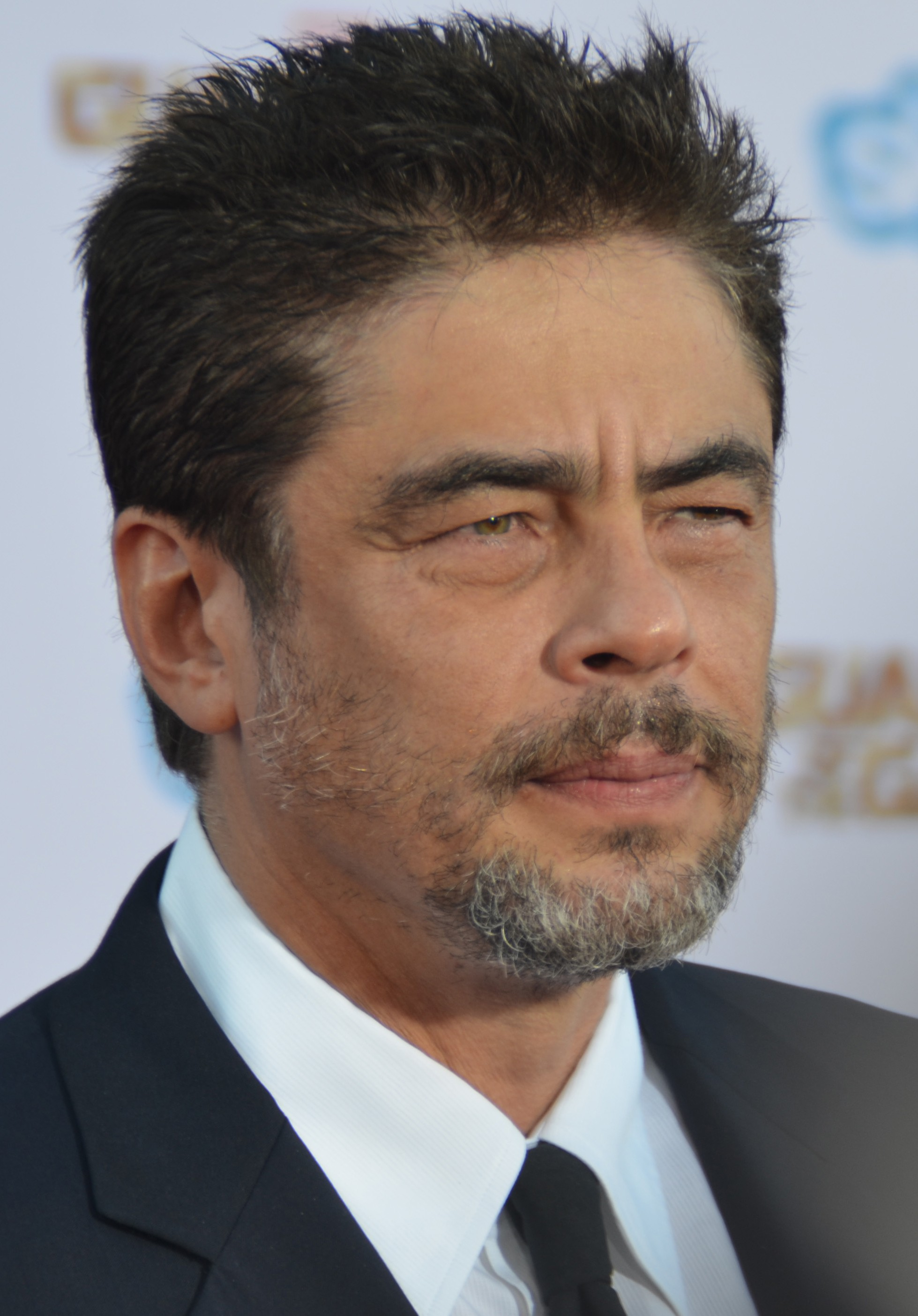
Benicio del Toro, Best Supporting Actor winner

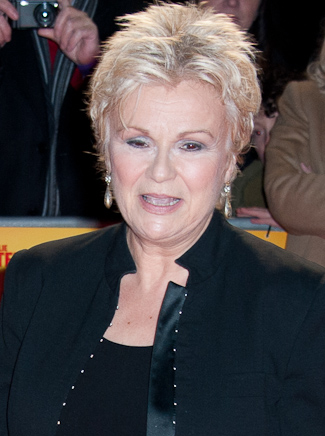
Julie Walters, Best Supporting Actress winner

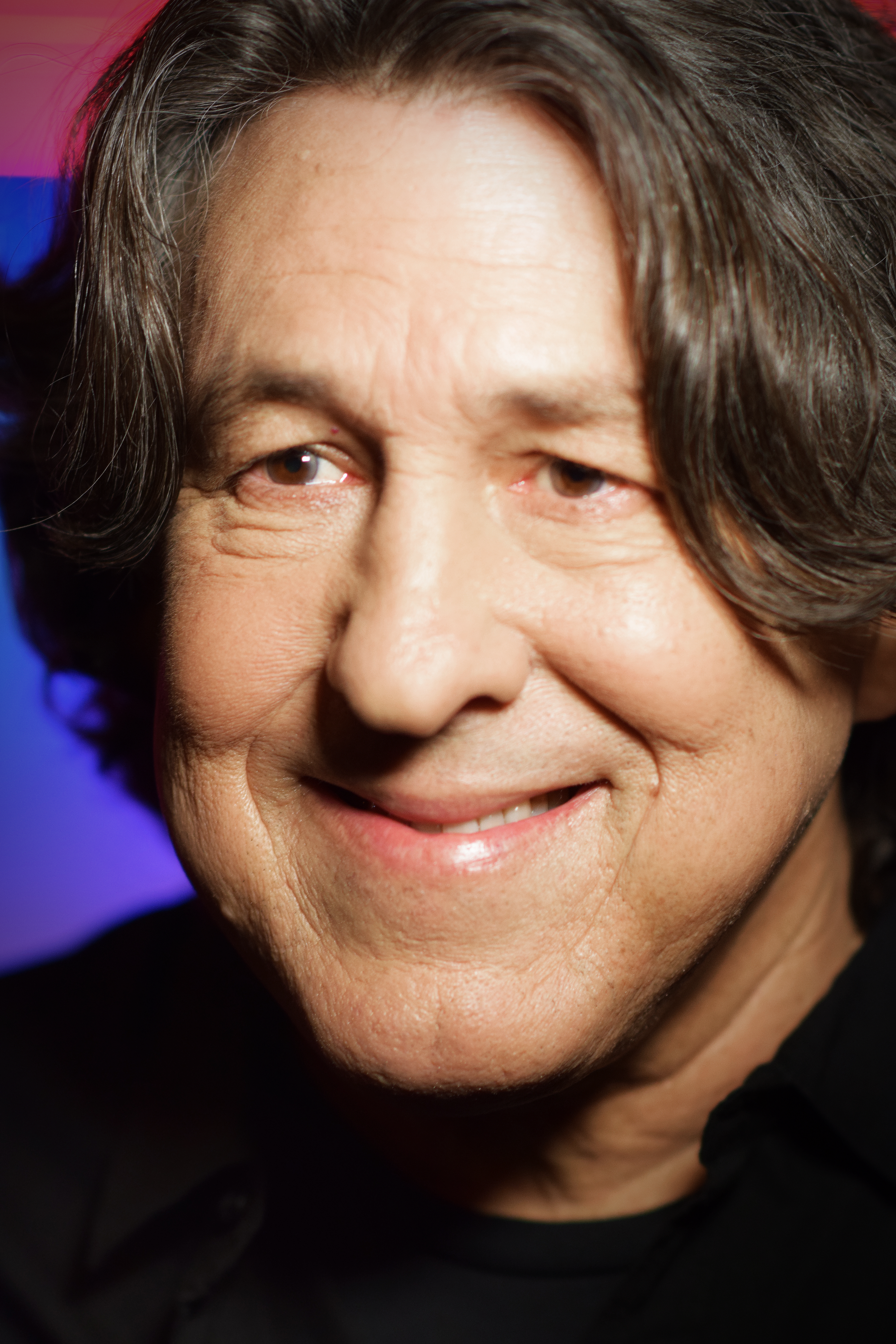
Cameron Crowe, Best Original Screenplay winner

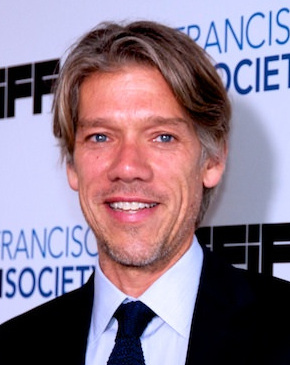
Stephen Gaghan, Best Adapted Screenplay winner

=== BAFTA Fellowship ===
- **Judi Dench** and **Albert Finney**

=== Outstanding British Contribution to Cinema ===
- **Mary Selway**

=== Awards ===
Winners are listed first and highlighted in boldface.

**Best Film**: **Gladiator – Douglas Wick, David Franzoni and Branko Lustig**; Almost Famous – Cameron Crowe and Ian Bryce; Billy Elliot – Greg Brenman and Jon Finn; Crouching Tiger, Hidden Dragon – Bill Kong, Hsu Li Kong and Ang Lee; Erin Brockovich – Danny DeVito, Michael Shamberg and Stacey Sher	**Best Direction**: **Ang Lee – Crouching Tiger, Hidden Dragon**; Stephen Daldry – Billy Elliot; Ridley Scott – Gladiator; Steven Soderbergh – Erin Brockovich; Steven Soderbergh – Traffic
**Best Actor in a Leading Role**: **Jamie Bell – Billy Elliot as Billy Elliot**; Russell Crowe – Gladiator as Maximus Decimus Meridius; Michael Douglas – Wonder Boys as Professor Grady Tripp; Tom Hanks – Cast Away as Chuck Noland; Geoffrey Rush – Quills as Marquis de Sade	**Best Actress in a Leading Role**: **Julia Roberts – Erin Brockovich as Erin Brockovich**; Juliette Binoche – Chocolat as Vianne Rocher; Kate Hudson – Almost Famous as Penny Lane; Hilary Swank – Boys Don't Cry as Brandon Teena; Michelle Yeoh – Crouching Tiger, Hidden Dragon as Yu Shu Lien
**Best Actor in a Supporting Role**: **Benicio del Toro – Traffic as Javier Rodriguez**; Albert Finney – Erin Brockovich as Edward L. Masry; Gary Lewis – Billy Elliot as Jackie Elliot; Joaquin Phoenix – Gladiator as Commodus; Oliver Reed – Gladiator as Antonius Proximo (posthumous)	**Best Actress in a Supporting Role**: **Julie Walters – Billy Elliot as Sandra Wilkinson**; Judi Dench – Chocolat as Armande Voizin; Frances McDormand – Almost Famous as Elaine Miller; Lena Olin – Chocolat as Josephine Muscat; Zhang Ziyi – Crouching Tiger, Hidden Dragon as Jen Yu
**Best Original Screenplay**: **Almost Famous – Cameron Crowe**; Billy Elliot – Lee Hall; Erin Brockovich – Susannah Grant; Gladiator – David Franzoni, John Logan and William Nicholson; O Brother, Where Art Thou? – Ethan Coen and Joel Coen	**Best Adapted Screenplay**: **Traffic – Stephen Gaghan**; Chocolat – Robert Nelson Jacobs; Crouching Tiger, Hidden Dragon – James Schamus, Wang Hui-Ling and Tsai Kuo-Jung; High Fidelity – D.V. DeVincentis, Steve Pink, John Cusack and Scott Rosenberg; Wonder Boys – Steve Kloves
**Best Cinematography**: **Gladiator – John Mathieson**; Billy Elliot – Brian Tufano; Chocolat – Roger Pratt; Crouching Tiger, Hidden Dragon – Peter Pau; O Brother, Where Art Thou? – Roger Deakins	**Best Costume Design**: **Crouching Tiger, Hidden Dragon – Tim Yip**; Chocolat – Renee Ehrlich Kalfus; Gladiator – Janty Yates; The House of Mirth – Monica Howe; Quills – Jacqueline West
**Best Editing**: **Gladiator – Pietro Scalia**; Billy Elliot – John Wilson; Crouching Tiger, Hidden Dragon – Tim Squyres; Erin Brockovich – Anne V. Coates; Traffic – Stephen Mirrione	**Best Makeup and Hair**: **How the Grinch Stole Christmas – Rick Baker, Kazuhiro Tsuji, Toni G, Gail Ryan and Sylvia Nava**; Chocolat – Naomi Donne; Crouching Tiger, Hidden Dragon – Man Yun Ling and Chau Siu Mui; Gladiator – Paul Engelen and Graham Johnston; Quills – Peter King and Nuala Conway
**Best Original Music**: **Crouching Tiger, Hidden Dragon – Tan Dun**; Almost Famous – Nancy Wilson; Billy Elliot – Stephen Warbeck; Gladiator – Hans Zimmer and Lisa Gerrard; O Brother, Where Art Thou? – T Bone Burnett and Carter Burwell	**Best Production Design**: **Gladiator – Arthur Max**; Chocolat – David Gropman; Crouching Tiger, Hidden Dragon – Tim Yip; O Brother, Where Art Thou? – Dennis Gassner; Quills – Martin Childs
**Best Sound**: **Almost Famous – Jeff Wexler, Doug Hemphill, Rick Kline, Paul Massey and Mike Wilhoit**; Billy Elliot – Mark Holding, Mike Prestwood Smith and Zane Hayward; Crouching Tiger, Hidden Dragon – Drew Kunin, Reilly Steele, Eugene Gearty and Robert Fernandez; Gladiator – Ken Weston, Scott Millan, Bob Beemer and Per Hallberg; The Perfect Storm – Keith A. Wester, John T. Reitz, Gregg Rudloff, David E. Campbell, Wylie Stateman and Kelly Cabral	**Best Special Visual Effects**: **The Perfect Storm – Stefen Fangmeier, John Frazier, Walt Conti, Habib Zargarpour and Tim Alexander**; Chicken Run – Paddy Eason, Mark Nelmes and Dave Alex Riddett; Crouching Tiger, Hidden Dragon – Rob Hodgson, Leo Lo, Jonathan F. Strylund, Bessie Cheuk and Travis Baumann; Gladiator – John Nelson, Tim Burke, Rob Harvey and Neil Corbould; Vertical Limit – Kent Houston, Tricia Ashford, Neil Corbould, Paul Docherty and Dion Hatch
**Outstanding British Film**: **Billy Elliot – Greg Brenman, Jon Finn and Stephen Daldry**; Chicken Run – Peter Lord, David Sproxton and Nick Park; The House of Mirth – Olivia Stewart and Terence Davies; Last Resort – Ruth Caleb and Paweł Pawlikowski; Sexy Beast – Jeremy Thomas and Jonathan Glazer	**Outstanding Debut by a British Writer, Director or Producer**: **Last Resort – Paweł Pawlikowski (Writer/Director)**; Billy Elliot – Lee Hall (Writer); Billy Elliot – Stephen Daldry (Director); Saving Grace – Mark Crowdy (Writer/Producer); Some Voices – Simon Cellan Jones (Director)
**Best Short Animation**: **Father and Daughter – Claire Jennings, Willem Thijssen and Michaël Dudok de Wit**; Cloud Cover – Lisbeth Svarling; Lounge Act – Teun Hitte and Gareth Love; Six of One – Phil Davies and Tim Webb	**Best Short Film**: **Shadowscan – Gary Holding, Justine Leahy and Tinge Krishnan**; Going Down – Soledad Gatti-Pascual, Tom Shankland and Jane Harris; Je t'aime John Wayne – Luke Morris, Toby MacDonald and Luke Ponte; The Last Post – Lee Santana and Dominic Santana; Sweet – Rob Mercer and James Pilkington
**Best Film Not in the English Language**: **Crouching Tiger, Hidden Dragon – Bill Kong, Hsu Li Kong and Ang Lee**; Girl on the Bridge – Christian Fechner and Patrice Leconte; Harry, He's Here to Help – Michel Saint-Jean and Dominik Moll; In the Mood for Love – Wong Kar-Wai; Malèna – Harvey Weinstein, Carlo Bernasconi and Giuseppe Tornatore

== Statistics ==
Films that received multiple nominations
Nominations	Film
14	Crouching Tiger, Hidden Dragon
14	Gladiator
13	Billy Elliot
8	Chocolat
6	Almost Famous
6	Erin Brockovich
4	O Brother, Where Art Thou?
4	Quills
4	Traffic
2	Chicken Run
2	The House of Mirth
2	Last Resort
2	The Perfect Storm
2	Wonder Boys

Films that received multiple awards
Awards	Film
4	Crouching Tiger, Hidden Dragon
4	Gladiator
3	Billy Elliot
2	Almost Famous
2	Traffic

== See also ==
- 73rd Academy Awards
- 26th César Awards
- 6th Critics' Choice Awards
- 53rd Directors Guild of America Awards
- 14th European Film Awards
- 58th Golden Globe Awards
- 12th Golden Laurel Awards
- 21st Golden Raspberry Awards
- 15th Goya Awards
- 5th Golden Satellite Awards
- 16th Independent Spirit Awards
- 6th Lumière Awards
- 27th Saturn Awards
- 7th Screen Actors Guild Awards
- 53rd Writers Guild of America Awards
