= 58th Golden Globe Awards =

Film award ceremony in 2001

- Date: January 21, 2001
- Site: Beverly Hilton Hotel; Beverly Hills, Los Angeles, California

Highlights
- Best Film: Drama: Gladiator
- Best Film: Musical or Comedy: Almost Famous
- Best Drama Series: The West Wing
- Best Musical or Comedy Series: Sex and the City
- Best Miniseries or Television movie: Dirty Pictures
- Most awards: (2) Almost Famous; Gladiator; Traffic
- Most nominations: (5) Gladiator; Traffic

Television coverage
- Network: NBC

The 58th Golden Globe Awards, honoring the best in film and television for 2000, were held on January 21, 2001. The nominations were announced on December 21, 2000.

== Winners and nominees ==
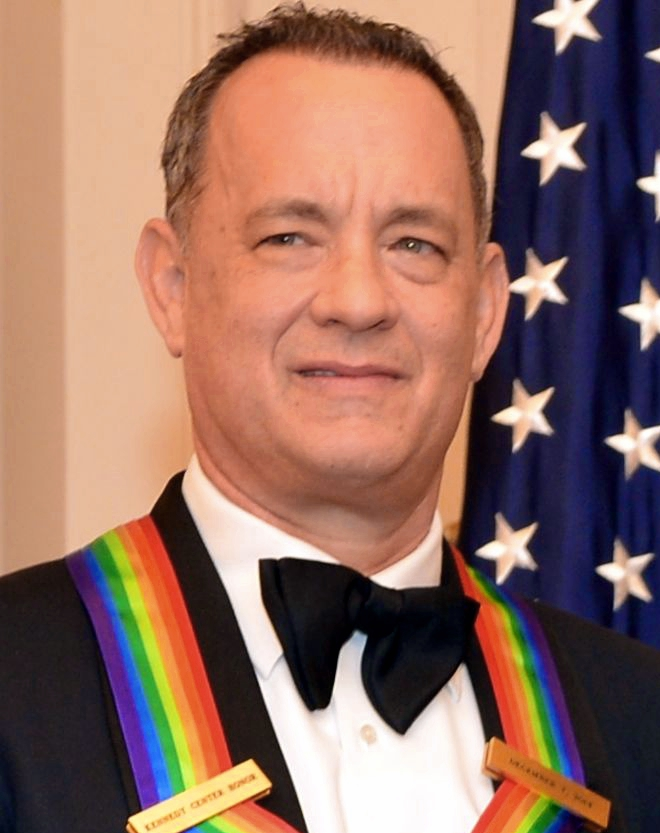
Tom Hanks - Best Lead Actor in a Motion Picture - Drama winner

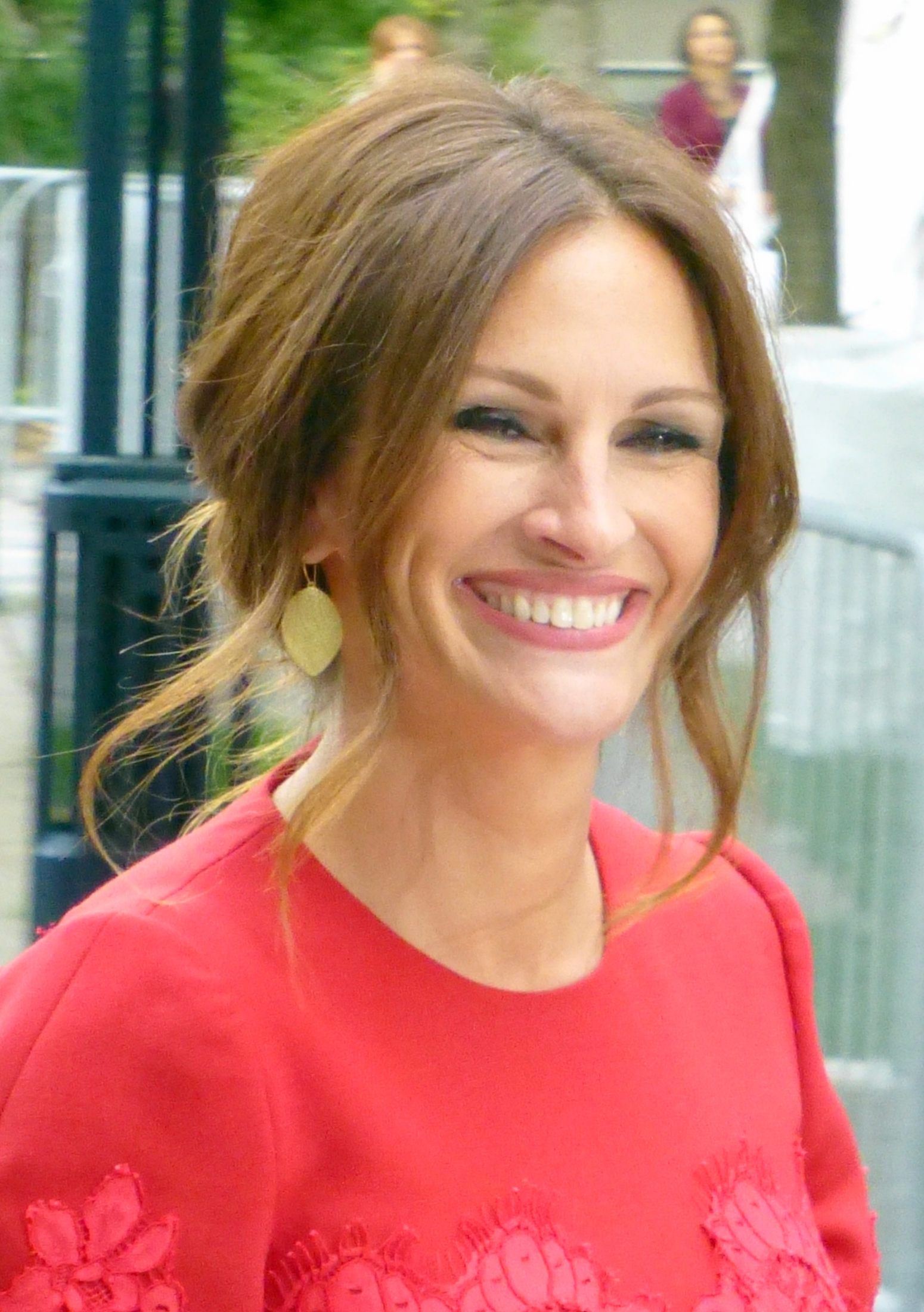
Julia Roberts - Best Lead Actress in a Motion Picture - Drama winner

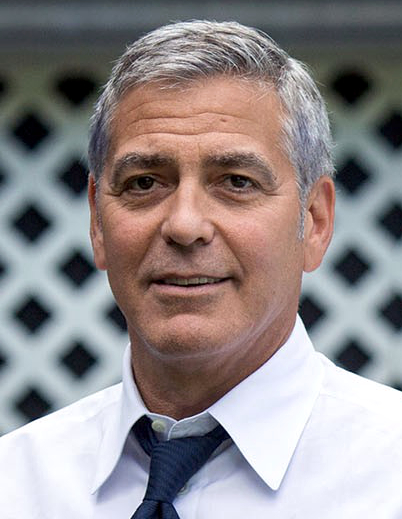
George Clooney - Best Lead Actor in a Motion Picture - Musical or Comedy winner

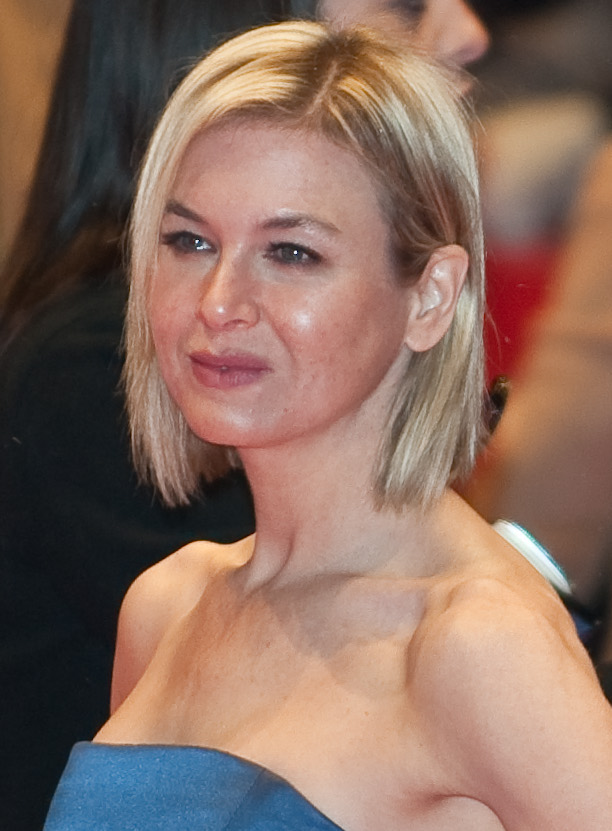
Renee Zellweger - Best Lead Actress in a Motion Picture - Musical or Comedy winner

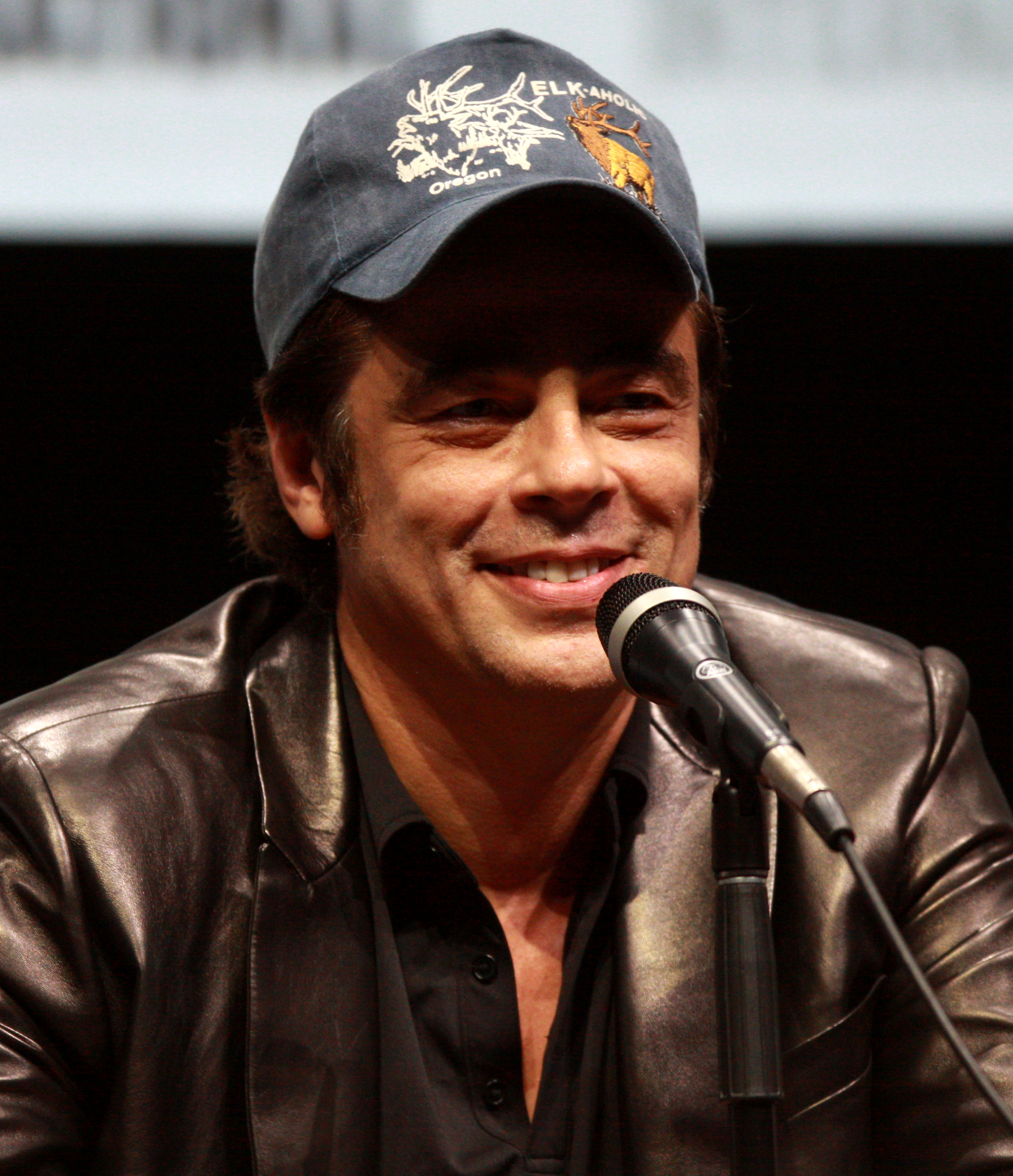
Benicio del Toro - Best Supporting Actor in a Motion Picture - Drama, Musical or Comedy winner

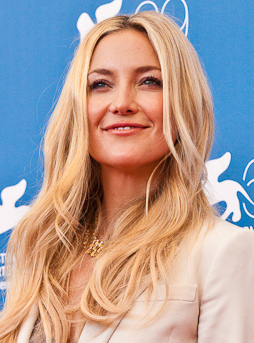
Kate Hudson - Best Supporting Actress in a Motion Picture - Drama, Musical or Comedy winner

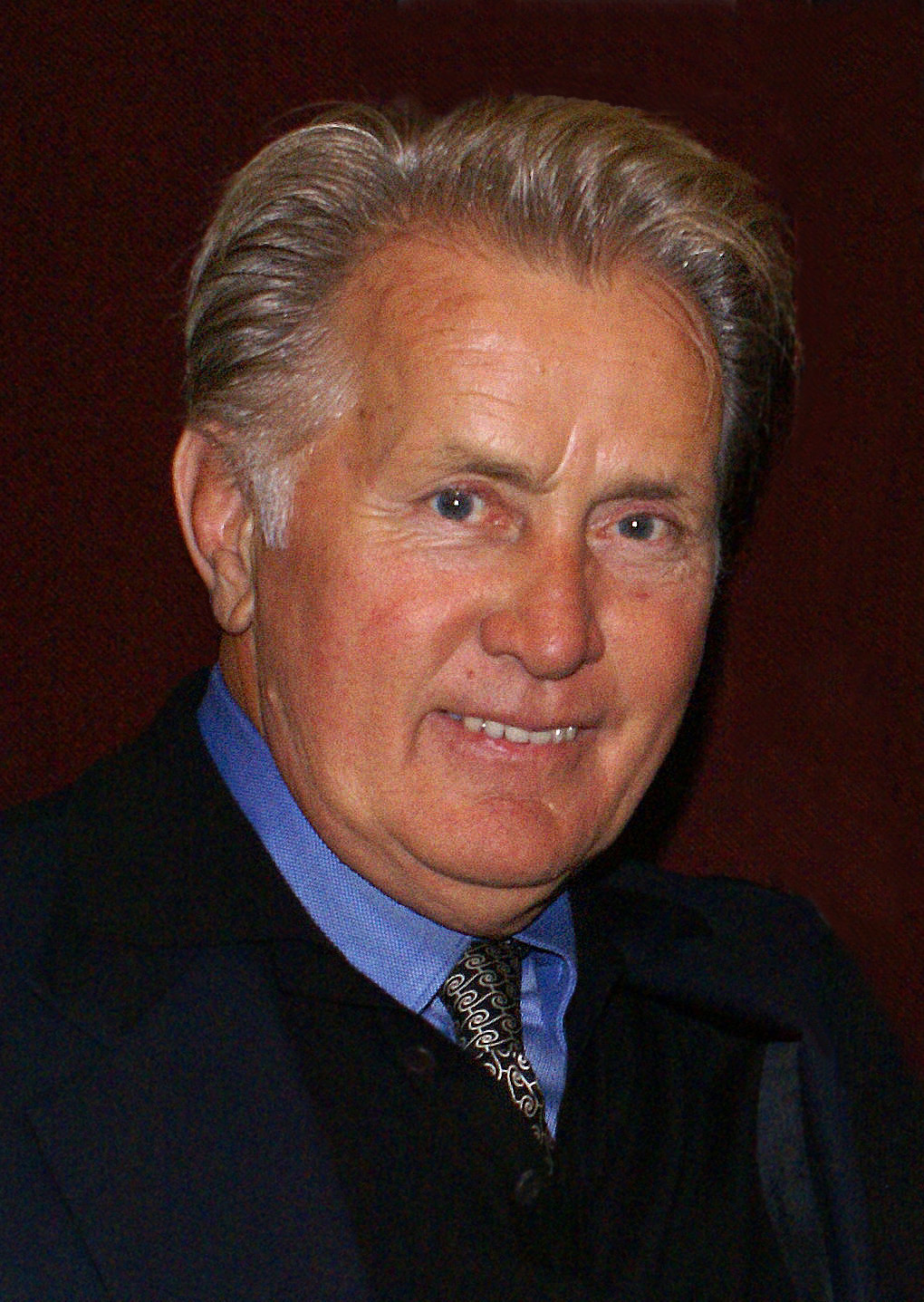
Martin Sheen - Best Lead Actor in a Series, Drama winner

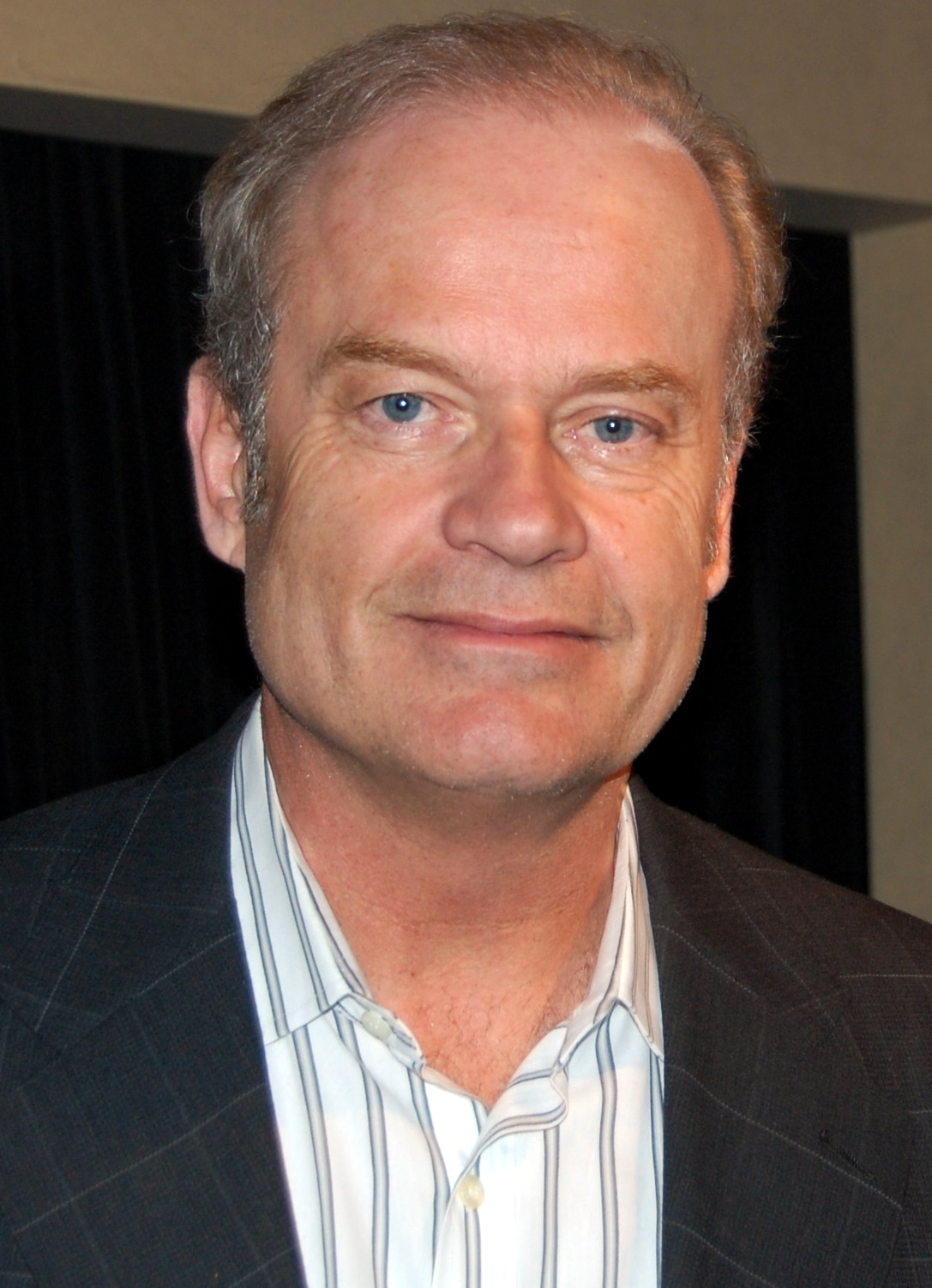
Kelsey Grammer - Best Lead Actor in a Series, Musical or Comedy winner

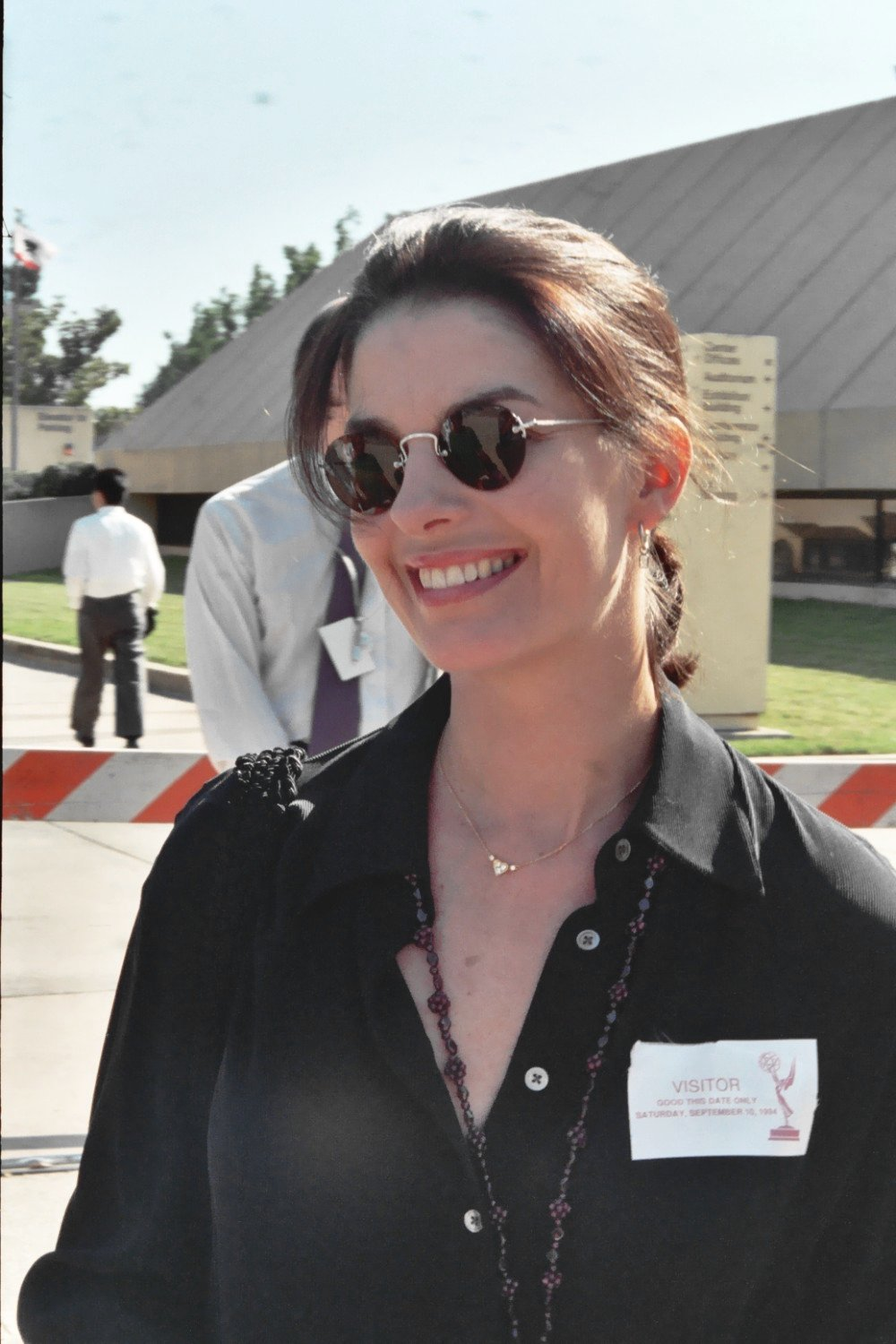
Sela Ward - Best Lead Actress in a Series, Drama winner

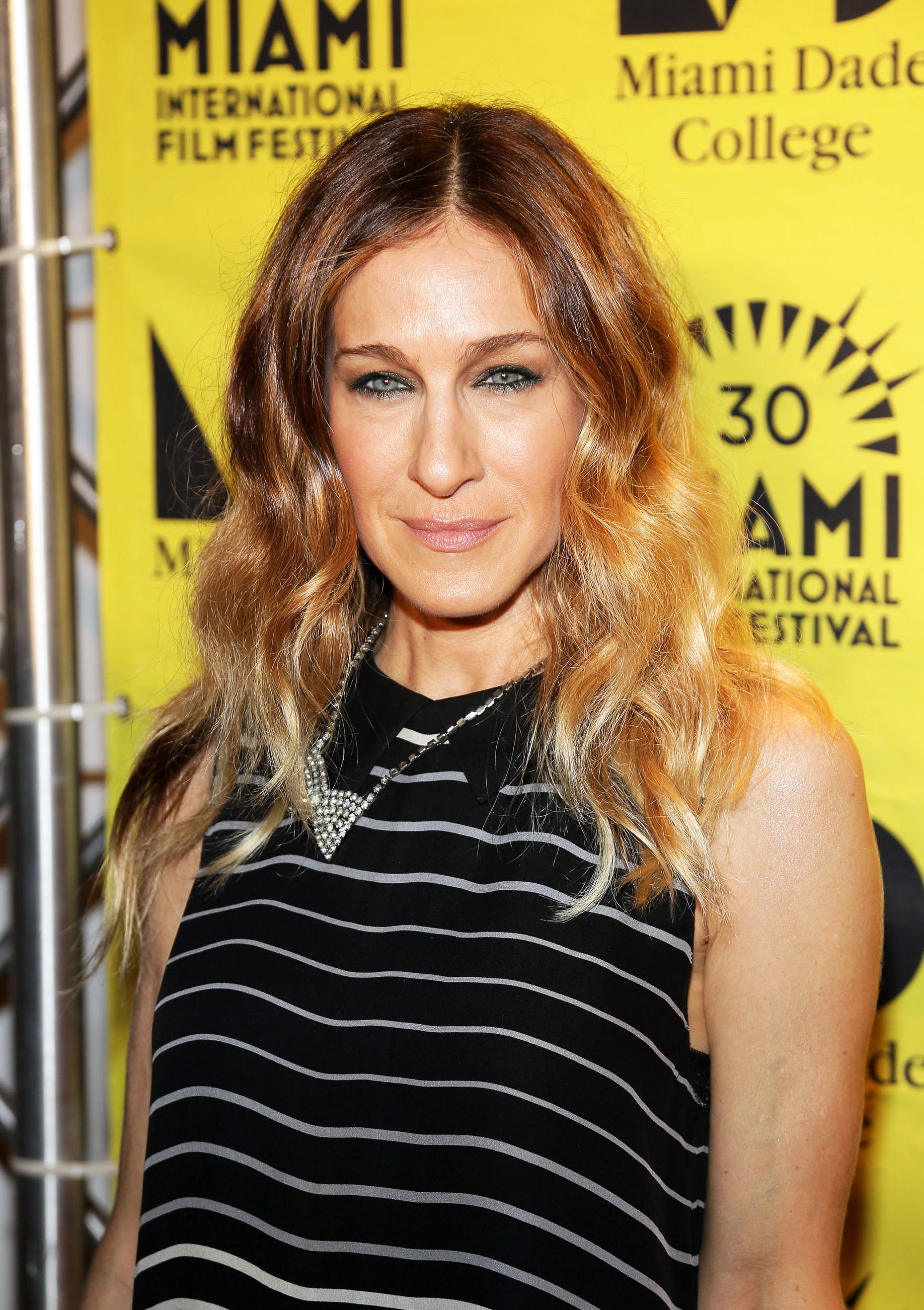
Sarah Jessica Parker - Best Lead Actress in a Series, Musical or Comedy winner

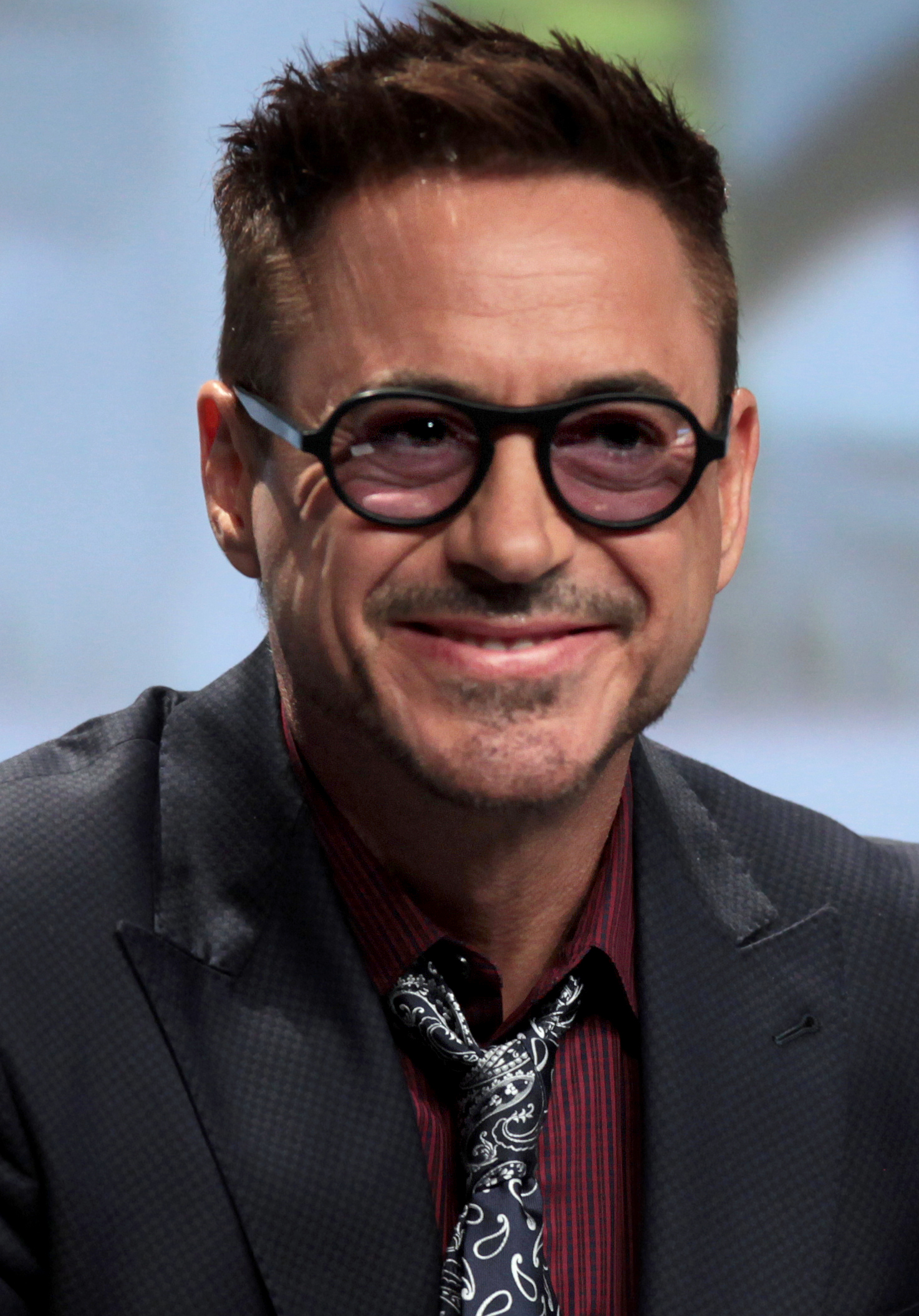
Robert Downey, Jr. - Best Supporting Actor in a Series, Miniseries or Television Film winner

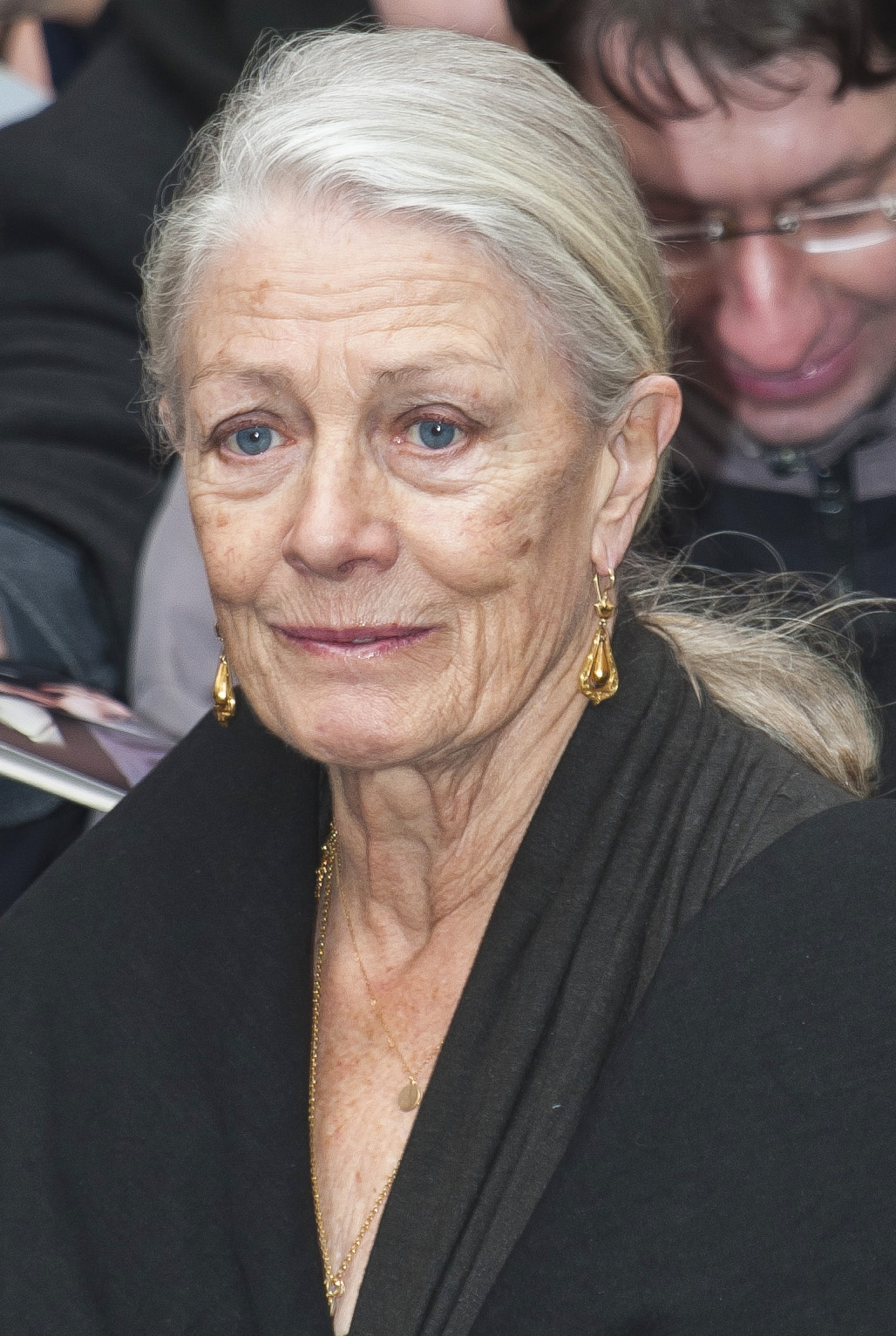
Vanessa Redgrave - Best Supporting Actress in a Series, Miniseries or Television Film winner

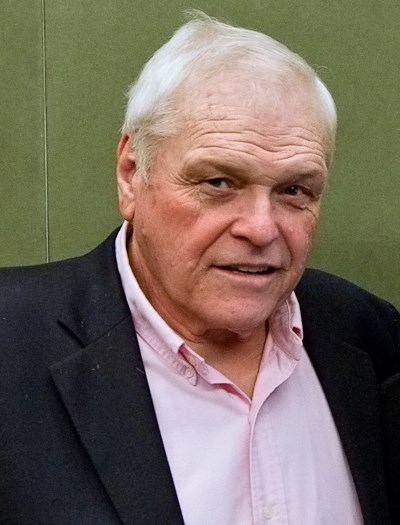
Brian Dennehy - Best Lead Actor in a Miniseries or Television Film winner

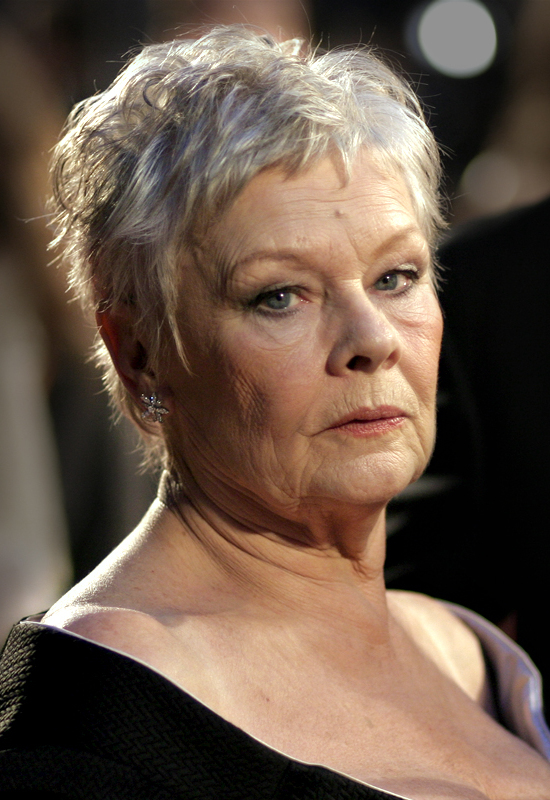
Judi Dench - Best Lead Actress in a Miniseries or Television Film winner

=== Film ===
Best Motion Picture
Drama	Musical or Comedy
Gladiator: Billy Elliot; Erin Brockovich; Sunshine; Traffic; Wonder Boys	Almost Famous: Best in Show; Chicken Run; Chocolat; O Brother, Where Art Thou?
Best Performance in a Motion Picture – Drama
Actor	Actress
Tom Hanks – Cast Away as Chuck Noland: Javier Bardem – Before Night Falls as Reinaldo Arenas; Russell Crowe – Gladiator as Maximus Decimus Meridius; Michael Douglas – Wonder Boys as Grady Tripp; Geoffrey Rush – Quills as Marquis de Sade	Julia Roberts – Erin Brockovich as Erin Brockovich: Joan Allen – The Contender as Senator Laine Hanson; Björk – Dancer in the Dark as Selma Ježková; Ellen Burstyn – Requiem for a Dream as Sara Goldfarb; Laura Linney – You Can Count on Me as Sammy Prescott
Best Performance in a Motion Picture – Musical or Comedy
Actor	Actress
George Clooney – O Brother, Where Art Thou? as Ulysses Everett McGill: Jim Carrey – How the Grinch Stole Christmas as the Grinch; John Cusack – High Fidelity as Rob Gordon; Robert De Niro – Meet the Parents as Jack Byrnes; Mel Gibson – What Women Want as Nick Marshall	Renée Zellweger – Nurse Betty as Betty Sizemore: Juliette Binoche – Chocolat as Vianne Rocher; Brenda Blethyn – Saving Grace as Grace Trevethyn; Sandra Bullock – Miss Congeniality as Gracie Hart; Tracey Ullman – Small Time Crooks as Frances "Frenchy" Winkler
Best Supporting Performance in a Motion Picture – Drama, Musical or Comedy
Supporting Actor	Supporting Actress
Benicio del Toro – Traffic as Javier Rodriguez: Jeff Bridges – The Contender as President Jackson Evans; Willem Dafoe – Shadow of the Vampire as Max Schreck; Albert Finney – Erin Brockovich as Edward "Ed" Masry; Joaquin Phoenix – Gladiator as Commodus	Kate Hudson – Almost Famous as Penny Lane: Judi Dench – Chocolat as Armande Voizin; Frances McDormand – Almost Famous as Elaine Miller; Julie Walters – Billy Elliot as Sandra Wilkinson; Catherine Zeta-Jones – Traffic as Helena Ayala
Other
Best Director	Best Screenplay
Ang Lee – Crouching Tiger, Hidden Dragon (Wo hu cang long): Ridley Scott – Gladiator; Steven Soderbergh – Erin Brockovich; Steven Soderbergh – Traffic; Istvan Szabo – Sunshine	Traffic – Stephen Gaghan: Almost Famous – Cameron Crowe; Quills – Doug Wright; Wonder Boys – Steve Kloves; You Can Count on Me – Kenneth Lonergan
Best Original Score	Best Original Song
Gladiator – Hans Zimmer and Lisa Gerrard: All the Pretty Horses – Larry Paxton, Marty Stuart and Kristin Wilkinson; Chocolat – Rachel Portman; Wo hu cang long (Crouching Tiger, Hidden Dragon) – Tan Dun; Malèna – Ennio Morricone; Sunshine – Maurice Jarre	"Things Have Changed" performed by Bob Dylan – Wonder Boys: "I've Seen It All" performed by Björk – Dancer in the Dark; "My Funny Friend and Me" performed by Sting – The Emperor's New Groove; "One in a Million" performed by Bosson – Miss Congeniality; "When You Come Back to Me Again" performed by Garth Brooks – Frequency
Best Foreign Language Film
Wo hu cang long (Crouching Tiger, Hidden Dragon), Taiwan: Amores perros, Mexico; The Hundred Steps, Italy; Malèna, Italy; The Widow of Saint-Pierre, France

The following films received multiple nominations:

Nominations	Title
5	Gladiator
5	Traffic
4	Almost Famous
4	Chocolat
4	Erin Brockovich
4	Wonder Boys
3	Crouching Tiger, Hidden Dragon
3	Sunshine
2	Billy Elliot
2	The Contender
2	Miss Congeniality
2	O Brother, Where Art Thou?
2	Quills
2	You Can Count on Me
2	Malèna
2	Dancer in the Dark

The following films received multiple wins:

Wins	Title
2	Almost Famous
2	Gladiator
2	Traffic
2	Crouching Tiger, Hidden Dragon

=== Television ===
Best Television Series
Drama	Musical or Comedy
The West Wing (NBC); CSI: Crime Scene Investigation (CBS); ER (NBC); The Practice (ABC); The Sopranos (HBO)	Sex and the City (HBO); Ally McBeal (Fox); Frasier (NBC); Malcolm in the Middle (Fox); Will & Grace (NBC)
Best Performance in a Television Series – Drama
Actor	Actress
Martin Sheen – The West Wing (NBC) as President Josiah "Jed" Bartlet; Andre Braugher – Gideon's Crossing (ABC) as Dr. Ben Gideon; James Gandolfini – The Sopranos (HBO) as Tony Soprano; Rob Lowe – The West Wing (NBC) as Sam Seaborn; Dylan McDermott – The Practice (ABC) as Bobby Donnell	Sela Ward – Once and Again (ABC) as Lily Manning; Jessica Alba – Dark Angel (Fox) as Max Guevera; Lorraine Bracco – The Sopranos (HBO) as Dr. Jennifer Melfi; Amy Brenneman – Judging Amy (CBS) as Judge Amy Gray; Edie Falco – The Sopranos (HBO) as Carmela Soprano; Sarah Michelle Gellar – Buffy the Vampire Slayer (The WB) as Buffy Summers
Best Performance in a Television Series – Musical or Comedy
Actor	Actress
Kelsey Grammer – Frasier (NBC) as Dr. Frasier Crane; Ted Danson – Becker (CBS) as Dr. John Becker; Eric McCormack – Will & Grace (NBC) as Will Truman; Frankie Muniz – Malcolm in the Middle (Fox) as Malcolm Wilkerson; Ray Romano – Everybody Loves Raymond (CBS) as Raymond "Ray" Barone	Sarah Jessica Parker – Sex and the City (HBO) as Carrie Bradshaw; Calista Flockhart – Ally McBeal (Fox) as Ally McBeal; Jane Kaczmarek – Malcolm in the Middle (Fox) as Lois Wilkerson; Debra Messing – Will & Grace (NBC) as Grace Adler; Bette Midler – Bette (CBS) as Bette
Best Performance in a Miniseries or Television Film
Actor	Actress
Brian Dennehy – Death of a Salesman (Showtime) as Willy Loman; Alec Baldwin – Nuremberg (TNT) as Robert H. Jackson; Brian Cox – Nuremberg (TNT) as Hermann Göring; Andy García – For Love or Country: The Arturo Sandoval Story (HBO) as Arturo Sandoval; James Woods – Dirty Pictures (Showtime) as Dennis Barrie	Judi Dench – The Last of the Blonde Bombshells (HBO) as Elizabeth; Holly Hunter – Harlan County War (Showtime) as Ruby Kincaid; Christine Lahti – An American Daughter (Lifetime) as Lyssa Dent Hughes; Frances O'Connor – Madame Bovary (PBS) as Emma Bovary; Rachel Ward – On the Beach (Showtime) as Moira Davidson; Alfre Woodard – Holiday Heart (Showtime) as Wanda Dean
Best Supporting Performance in a Series, Miniseries or Television Film
Supporting Actor	Supporting Actress
Robert Downey Jr. – Ally McBeal (Fox) as Larry Paul; Sean Hayes – Will & Grace (NBC) as Jack McFarland; John Mahoney – Frasier (NBC) as Martin Crane; David Hyde Pierce – Frasier (NBC) as Niles Crane; Christopher Plummer – American Tragedy (CBS) as F. Lee Bailey; Bradley Whitford – The West Wing (NBC) as Josh Lyman	Vanessa Redgrave – If These Walls Could Talk 2 (HBO) as Edith Tree; Kim Cattrall – Sex and the City (HBO) as Samantha Jones; Faye Dunaway – Running Mates (TNT) as Meg Gable; Allison Janney – The West Wing (NBC) as C.J. Cregg; Megan Mullally – Will & Grace as Karen Walker (HBO); Cynthia Nixon – Sex and the City (HBO) as Miranda Hobbes
Best Miniseries or Television Film
Dirty Pictures (Showtime); Fail Safe (CBS); For Love or Country: The Arturo Sandoval Story (HBO); Nuremberg (TNT); On the Beach (Showtime)

The following programs received multiple nominations:

Nominations	Title
5	The West Wing
5	Will & Grace
4	Frasier
4	The Sopranos
4	Sex and the City
3	Ally McBeal
3	Malcolm in the Middle
3	Nuremberg
2	Dirty Pictures
2	For Love or Country: The Arturo Sandoval Story
2	On the Beach
2	The Practice

The following programs received multiple wins:

Wins	Title
2	Sex and the City
2	The West Wing

== Ceremony ==
=== Presenters ===
- Gillian Anderson
- Monica Bellucci
- Jeff Bridges
- Billy Campbell
- Don Cheadle
- George Clooney
- Phil Collins
- Tom Cruise
- Jamie Lee Curtis
- Robert Downey, Jr.
- Edie Falco
- Peter Fonda
- Brendan Fraser
- James Gandolfini
- Hugh Grant
- Patricia Heaton
- Angelina Jolie
- Melina Kanakaredes
- Nicole Kidman
- Eriq La Salle
- Heather Locklear
- Camryn Manheim
- Julianne Moore
- Haley Joel Osment
- Sarah Jessica Parker
- Bill Paxton
- Keanu Reeves
- Julia Roberts
- Kevin Spacey
- David Spade
- Hilary Swank
- Elizabeth Taylor
- Charlize Theron
- Vince Vaughn
- Denzel Washington
- Sigourney Weaver
- Reese Witherspoon

== Awards breakdown ==
The following networks received multiple nominations:

Nominations	Network
15	NBC
12	HBO
7	CBS
7	Fox
7	Showtime
4	ABC
4	TNT

The following networks received multiple wins:

Wins	Network
2	HBO
2	NBC

== See also ==
- 73rd Academy Awards
- 21st Golden Raspberry Awards
- 7th Screen Actors Guild Awards
- 52nd Primetime Emmy Awards
- 53rd Primetime Emmy Awards
- 54th British Academy Film Awards
- 55th Tony Awards
- 2000 in film
- 2000 in American television
