= Hinkley, California =

Unincorporated community in California, United States

Hinkley
- Unincorporated community
- Location within the state of California
- Coordinates: 34°56′N 117°12′W
- Country: United States
- State: California
- County: San Bernardino
- Time zone: UTC-8 (Pacific (PST))
  - Summer (DST): UTC-7 (PDT)
- ZIP codes: 92347
- Area codes: 760/442
- FIPS code: 06-33924
- GNIS feature ID: 243490

Hinkley is an unincorporated community in the Mojave Desert, in San Bernardino County, California, United States, 14 miles (23 km) northwest of Barstow, 59 miles (95 km) east of Mojave, 47 miles (76 km) north of Victorville and about a 120-mile (193 km) drive northeast of Los Angeles, just north of California State Route 58. The residents have faced concerns over hexavalent chromium in their well water from the world's largest plume of this cancer-causing chemical.

== History ==
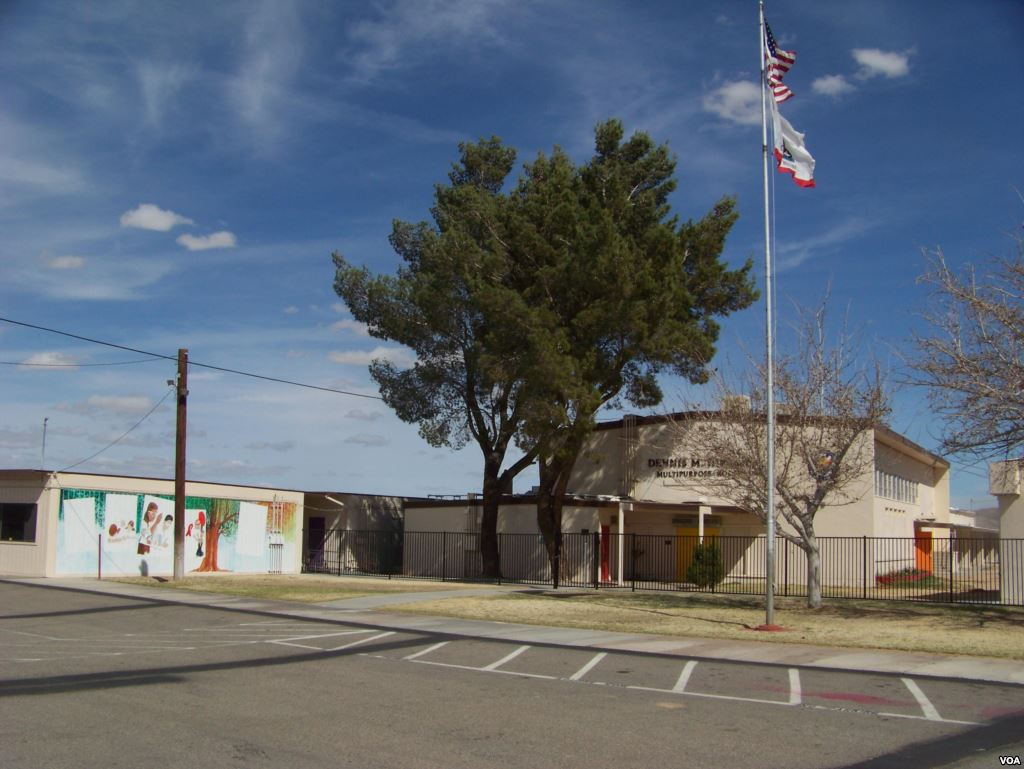
The only school in Hinkley closed in June 2013.

Between the 1960s and 1980s, several miles west of Hinkley along State Route 58, the Hawes Radio Tower at the World War II Hawes Auxiliary Airfield, a guyed mast, was used for military communication in the LF-range.

In 2015, Hinkley was one of the filming locations for Sky. Hinkley was also the setting for Erin Brockovich.

=== Groundwater contamination ===
From 1952, Hinkley has had its groundwater contaminated with hexavalent chromium by a compressor station for natural gas transmission pipelines. Residents of Hinkley eventually filed a class action lawsuit against Pacific Gas and Electric Company (PG&E).

In 1993, Erin Brockovich, a legal clerk to lawyer Edward L. Masry, investigated the apparent elevated cluster of illnesses in the community linked to hexavalent chromium. The efforts of Brockovich and Masry, and the plight of the people of Hinkley, became widely known when the film Erin Brockovich was released in 2000.

After many arguments, the case was referred to arbitration with maximum damages of $400 million. The case was settled in 1996 for US$333 million, the largest settlement ever paid in a direct-action lawsuit in United States history. In 2006, PG&E agreed to pay $295 million to settle cases involving another 1,100 people statewide for hexavalent chromium-related claims.

== Demographics ==
Historical population
Census	Pop.	Note	%±
2000	1,915		—
2010	1,692		−11.6%
Figures are for ZIP Code Tabulation Area (ZCTA) 92347; Hinkley is not a Census place.

In early 2016, The New York Times described Hinkley as having been slowly turned into a ghost town due to the contamination of the area.

The United States does not define a census-designated place called Hinkley, but it does define a ZIP Code Tabulation Area (ZCTA), 92347. Because Hinkley is contained within this ZCTA, it is possible to obtain census data from the 2000 United States census for the area even though data for "Hinkley" are unavailable. As of the census of 2000, the ZCTA of 92347 had a population of 1,915. Of note is the fact that there were 485 people (26.7 percent of the population) five years in age or older categorized as having a disability, a higher than average figure when compared to the national average of about 19.3 percent.

As of the 2010 census, the ZCTA had a population of 1,692 (a decrease of 11.6% since 2000).

The 2020 census did not report a population for the ZCTA. But it did report 241 households, an employment rate of 18.1%, and the figure for holding a bachelor's degree or higher as 3.8%. The household income was reported as $38,140.

The postal ZIP Code is 92347 and the community is inside telephone area codes 760 and 442.

== Government ==
The town of Hinkley parks are managed under County Service area 70, Zone W
