= Tamara Rubin =

American filmmaker and activist

Tamara Rubin is an American activist, researcher and filmmaker focused on heavy metals poisoning prevention, particularly lead. A frequent speaker on the topic, she has appeared alongside Erin Brockovich at public events and is regularly covered in the news. Her research is known for being covered on social media.

Since 2018 she has run Lead Safe Mama LLC, now a crowd-funded, community-based company for Heavy Metals poisoning prevention which has found lead in fidget spinners, multiple food items, Stanley cups and in toothpaste.

== Early activity ==
In 2005, a contractor was hired by Rubin to paint her families house. The contractor was meant to use lead-safe practices to prep before painting, but instead used an illegal open-flame torch method to remove lead-based paint from Tamara Rubin's home in Northeast Portland, resulting in two of her children being lead poisoned, with a third lead poisoned by another cause. Rubin at that time was working as a computer consultant for the Apple Consultants Network (ACN) where she had met her husband, Len.

Initially Rubin used 3M Leadcheck testers to check items for toxic lead, being provided with additional units for free to donate to parents she was helping. In 2008, Rubin set up one of her early websites, named mychildrenhaveleadpoisoning.com, to raise awareness and tell her story. In 2009 Rubin was loaned a Niton XRF handheld tester by the manufacturer, which could test for a wider variety of toxic metals. Niton also trained and certified her.

In 2011, Rubin left her Apple Consultants Network job to focus full-time on producing a documentary on lead poisoning, MisLead: America's Secret Epidemic. In the same year, she also founded the Lead Safe America Foundation, one of her early events was a talk in Cedar Rapids for local parents in the same year. Rubin spoke about lead hazards in schools and informed parents about the risks of lead in children's toys and jewelry.

In 2015, an XRF handheld tester was purchased for Lead Safe America with donations, Rubin having been previously trained and certified in its use to be able to carry out work as a in-home heavy metals testing consultant for consumer goods. When Rubin left Lead Safe America, she gave the tester to the Foundation, and she rented XRF testers until 2020.

Rubin was invited as a guest speaker to teach others how to test consumer goods, demonstrating XRF testing and 3M Leadcheck testing of consumer goods and its limitations (to City and State Health Departments). Her efforts led to media attention and virality, and she shared her family's experiences with lead poisoning. She also testified at legislative hearings in Salem, supporting new regulations on lead use.

In March 2016, Rubin visited Flint, Michigan to discuss the dangers of lead in the tap water.

In April 2016, Rubin spoke on stage in Portland, Oregon alongside environmental activist Erin Brockovich about environmental advocacy, and organising to prevent, remove and warn of toxicants in the area.

After Lead Safe America was dissolved in October 2017, Rubin formed the Lead Safe Mama Facebook group in late 2017, followed by Lead Safe Mama LLC in January 2018, publishing results for the first party testing of products using XRF testing for which Rubin has been trained and certified to carry out.

Rubin's first publicised discovery after launching Lead Safe Mama came in late 2017, when she detected dangerously high levels of lead in a popular children's toy, the viral fidget spinner. Using an XRF scanner to test her own children's spinners, Rubin found that the center of the toy contained high amounts of lead. Her findings got the attention of the U.S. Public Interest Research Group (US PIRG), which did its own testing and confirmed that the ‘Fidget Wild Premium Spinner Brass’ contained 33,000 ppm lead, ~300 times the legal maximum allowed for children's toys. Another model tested at 1,300 parts per million. The toys were labeled for children aged 14 and older, exempting them from Federal lead restrictions. Rubin and other consumer advocates argued that fidget spinners were being marketed and sold alongside other younger children's toys, making them a hidden public health risk.

Rubin started offering both virtual and in-home paid consultations for individuals seeking to reduce lead exposure in their homes in 2018, creating an additional revenue stream to support her advocacy work.

== Activity in the 2020s ==
In 2020 Rubin was gifted two XRF handheld testers at a reduced cost of $2000 by a supporter and was able to repair them in order to carry out XRF testing without rental. Rubin also paid for servicing by doing testing parties.

In March 2023, Rubin reported the presence of lead in the base of Stanley tumblers which could become exposed over time on the product, causing potential lead poisoning. This led to a lawsuit against the manufacturer.

Initially relying on advertisements, Lead Safe Mama’s website begun generating income through affiliate commissions from lead-free products she recommends as alternatives on her website in around 2023.

Later on, in March 2024, Rubin began crowdfunding third party testing of foods, supplements, and personal care items, as these products required higher levels of heavy metal detection than was possible with XRF testing. The reports from the third-party lab testing for each product is published with the results and a safe list of uncontaminated products has been created.

In April 2025, Rubin published research carried out with third-party lab testing which showed toothpastes in the United States are widely contaminated with lead. This was reported inThe Guardian.

In May 2025, Rubin was credited by Consumer Reports for alerting the publication to the lead contamination of Cassava flour products. Consumer Reports' follow up investigation determined that more than two-thirds of the 27 products tested contained high lead levels.

== Legal history ==
In 2016, Rubin was investigated by the Oregon Department of Human Services (ODHS) and the IRS for alleged fraud and theft, and was removed from Lead Safe America Foundation. The foundation was dissolved in 2017, the remaining members choosing not to go on without Rubin, or wait for the investigation outcome.

The IRS concluded its investigation finding no evidence of tax evasion. To the contrary, investigators found that Rubin had been funding the charity out of her own pocket, loaning it money to cover expenses. The ODHS proceeded regardless, and Rubin was indicted on nine charges in November 2017. At her arraignment, Rubin pleaded not guilty to all counts.

All charges against Rubin were dropped in May 2018 by Multnomah County DA Rod Underhill, after ODHS investigator Kris Kalanges admitted in February 2018 that he had not reviewed the IRS evidence, financial records, and conclusions, and had withheld these documents from both the ODHS and Underhill. In 2019, the ODHS offered the Rubin family an out‑of‑court financial settlement.

In 2019, Rubin filed a lawsuit alleging that Oregon State violated her Fourth, Fifth, and Fourteenth Amendment rights by withholding exculpatory evidence. It was dismissed at District level in July 2022 on statute-of-limitations grounds. Rubin appealed to the Ninth Circuit in 2023.
