= Chocolat (2000 film) =

2000 film by Lasse Hallström

- Theatrical release poster
- Directed by: Lasse Hallström
- Screenplay by: Robert Nelson Jacobs
- Based on: Chocolat by Joanne Harris
- Produced by: David Brown; Kit Golden; Leslie Holleran
- Starring: Juliette Binoche; Judi Dench; Alfred Molina; Lena Olin; Johnny Depp; Carrie-Anne Moss; John Wood; Leslie Caron
- Cinematography: Roger Pratt
- Edited by: Andrew Mondshein
- Music by: Rachel Portman
- Distributed by: Miramax Films (United States); Miramax International (through Buena Vista International; United Kingdom and Ireland)
- Release dates: December 22, 2000 (United States); March 2, 2001 (United Kingdom)
- Running time: 121 minutes
- Countries: United Kingdom; United States
- Languages: English; French
- Budget: $25 million
- Box office: $152.7 million

Chocolat (French pronunciation: [ʃɔkɔla]) is a 2000 romance film directed by Lasse Hallström from a screenplay by Robert Nelson Jacobs, based on the 1999 novel by English author Joanne Harris. The film tells the story of Vianne Rocher, played by Juliette Binoche, who arrives in the fictional French village of Lansquenet-sous-Tannes at the beginning of Lent with her six-year-old daughter, Anouk. She opens a small chocolaterie. Soon, she and her chocolate influence the lives of the townspeople of this repressed French community in different and interesting ways.

The film began a limited theatrical release in the United States on December 22, 2000, and went on general release on January 5, 2001. Critics gave the drama positive reviews and a number of accolades, praising its acting performances, its screenplay, and Rachel Portman's score. It received five nominations at the 73rd Academy Awards, including Best Picture. Binoche won the European Film Award for Best Actress for her performance, while Dench was awarded a Screen Actors Guild Award in 2001.

Chocolat earned Binoche and Dench several Best Actress and Best Supporting Actress nominations respectively at various award ceremonies including the Academy Awards, the British Academy Film Awards, the Golden Globe Awards and the Screen Actors Guild Awards, with Dench winning the Screen Actors Guild Award for Outstanding Performance by a Female Actor in a Supporting Role.

== Plot ==
Vianne and her six-year-old daughter Anouk drift across Europe following the north wind, like Vianne's mother before her. In 1959, they arrive in the quiet French village of Lansquenet-sous-Tannes, of which the Comte de Reynaud is mayor, at the start of Lent. Vianne opens a chocolate shop; despite not fitting in well with the townspeople, she begins to make headway with some of the villagers, getting them to come to her shop. Reynaud, who will not admit that his wife has left him, speaks out against Vianne for tempting the people during Lent.

Armande, Vianne's elderly landlady, is one of her first allies. Armande's daughter Caroline will not let her see her grandson Luc, as she is a "bad influence". Vianne arranges for him and his grandmother to meet in the chocolaterie, where they bond. After finding out about their secret meetings, Caroline reveals her mother is diabetic, but she continues to eat the chocolate when visiting the shop.

Vianne develops a friendship with Josephine, who is being physically abused by her husband Serge, the local café owner. Through their friendship, Josephine finds the courage to leave Serge after he beats her, moving in with Vianne and Anouk. As she works at the chocolate shop and learns the craft, her confidence slowly increases. Simultaneously, under Reynaud's instruction, Serge attempts to make amends for his abusiveness, eventually asking Josephine to return to him, but she refuses. Later that night, a drunken Serge breaks into the shop, attacking both women, but Josephine knocks him out.

As the rivalry between Vianne and Reynaud intensifies, a band of river-faring Romani ("river rats") camp near the village. Although most of the town objects to their presence, Vianne embraces them and a mutual attraction develops between her and the leader, Roux. They throw a birthday party for Armande with villagers on Roux's boat. When Caroline sees Luc dancing with his grandmother, she begins to accept that Armande's influence in her son's life may be positive. Luc takes Armande home after the party, while Josephine and Anouk fall asleep on a boat, which Serge sets fire to, while Vianne and Roux have sex on a barge in the river. No one is hurt in the fire, but Vianne is shaken. Armande later dies in her home and is discovered by Luc. This devastates both Luc and his mother. Meanwhile, Roux packs up and leaves with his group.

Reynaud initially believes the fire was divine intervention until Serge confesses to starting it, saying he thought it was what Reynaud wanted. Horrified, Reynaud orders him to leave the village and never to return.

With the return of the north wind, Vianne realizes she cannot win against Reynaud, and decides to move on. Anouk, now attached to the town, refuses to go, and during a scuffle, the urn containing Vianne's mother's ashes breaks, scattering them over the floor. While recovering the ashes, Vianne sees a group of her friends who have come to help out in her shop, and understands the positive influence she has had on their lives. She decides to stay.

Despite shifting sentiment in the town, Reynaud remains staunch in his abstinence from chocolate. On the Saturday evening before Easter, Reynaud sees Caroline, to whom he is attracted, leaving the chocolaterie and is devastated. He breaks into the shop that night, smashing the special window display for the Easter festival. After a morsel of chocolate falls on his lip, he devours much of the chocolate in the window before collapsing in tears and falling asleep. The next morning, Vianne wakes him and gives him a drink to help him recover. Reynaud apologizes for his behavior. Père Henri, the town's young priest, gives a sermon emphasizing the importance of humanity over divinity.

The narrator, a grown-up Anouk, reveals that the sermon and festival are a success. Reynaud and Caroline start a relationship half a year later. Josephine takes over Serge's café, renaming it Café Armande. The north wind returns, but this time Vianne throws her mother's ashes out into the wind. Roux returns in the summer to be with Vianne and Anouk.

== Cast ==
- Juliette Binoche as Vianne Rocher
- Judi Dench as Armande Voizin, Caroline's mother and Vianne's landlady
- Alfred Molina as Comte de Reynaud, the mayor
- Lena Olin as Joséphine Muscat, Serge's abused wife
- Johnny Depp as Roux, a self-described "river-rat" and Vianne's lover
- Carrie-Anne Moss as Caroline Clairmont, Armande's daughter
- Hugh O'Conor as Père Henri, village priest
- John Wood as Guillaume Blérot, who carries a long-time yearning for Madame Audel
- Peter Stormare as Serge Muscat, café owner
- Victoire Thivisol as Anouk Rocher, Vianne's daughter (voiced by Sally Taylor-Isherwood because Victoire's French accent made her difficult to understand)
- Aurélien Parent-Koenig as Luc Clairmont, Caroline's son
- Ron Cook as Alphonse Marceau, Yvette's husband
- Elisabeth Commelin as Yvette Marceau, woman who buys chocolates as an aphrodisiac
- Leslie Caron as Madame Audel, village widow whose husband died in World War I
- Antonio Gil Martínez as Jean-Marc Drou
- Hélène Cardona as Françoise "Fuffi" Drou, beauty shop proprietor
- Michèle Gleizer as Madame Rivet, village woman who works for the Comte
- Dominique MacAvoy as Madame Pouget, village woman
- Arnaud Adam as Georges Rocher, Vianne's father
- Christianne Oliveira as Chitza Rocher, Vianne's mother
- Tatyana Yassukovich, the narrator

== Production ==
=== Filming ===
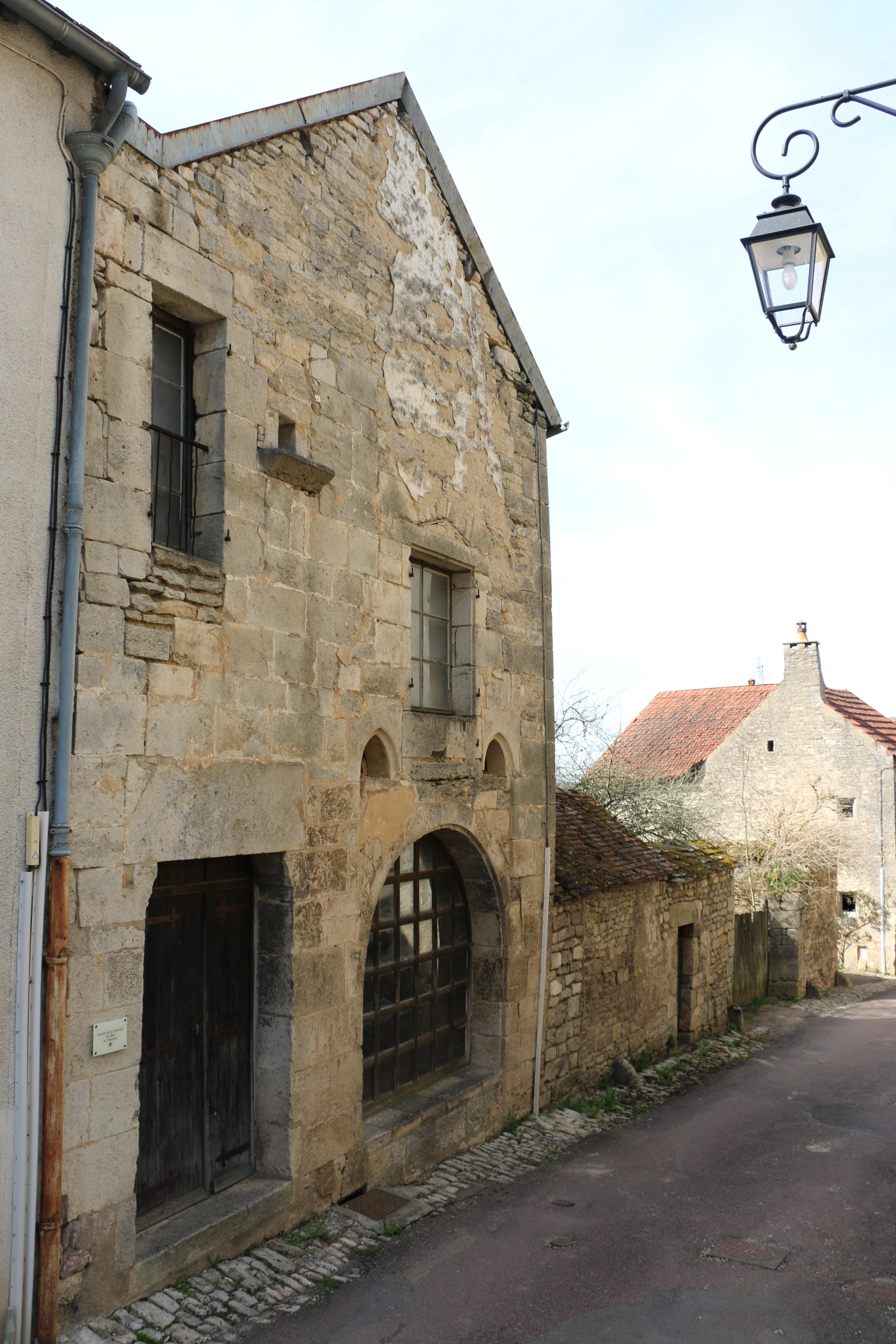
Filming: Vianne's shop in Flavigny-sur-Ozerain

Filming took place between May and August 2000 in the medieval village of Flavigny-sur-Ozerain in the region of Burgundy and on the Rue De L'ancienne Poste in Beynac-et-Cazenac in Dordogne. The river scenes were filmed at Fonthill Lake at Fonthill Bishop in Wiltshire and interior scenes at Shepperton Studios, England.

The film is dedicated to the memory of renowned cameraman Mike Roberts, who died in his sleep of natural causes during filming in England.

=== Music ===
Music written by Rachel Portman, except where noted.

1. "Minor Swing" (Django Reinhardt/Stéphane Grappelli) – 2:13
2. "Main Titles" – 3:07
3. "The Story of Grandmere" – 4:08
4. "Vianne Sets Up Shop" – 1:57
5. "Three Women" – 1:01
6. "Vianne Confronts the Comte" – 1:21
7. "Other Possibilities" – 1:34
8. "Guillaume's Confession" – 1:29
9. "Passage of Time" – 2:32
10. "Boycott Immorality" – 4:38
11. "Party Preparations" – 1:28
12. "Chocolate Sauce" – 0:48
13. "Fire" – 2:37
14. "Vianne Gazes at the River" – 1:06
15. "Mayan Bowl Breaks" – 2:14
16. "Taste of Chocolate" – 3:08
17. "Ashes to the Wind / Roux Returns" – 2:18
18. "Caravan" (Duke Ellington/Juan Tizol)– 3:43

Additionally: Erik Satie’s Gnossienne is heard in the scene where Viane tells the story of her parents’ meeting.

== Reception ==
=== Box office ===
Chocolat grossed US$152,699,946 worldwide, on a production budget of US$25 million. It was not successful in France.

=== Critical reception ===
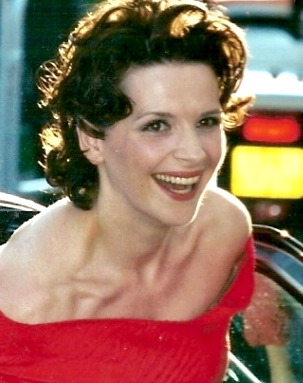
Chocolat earned Juliette Binoche her second Academy Award nomination.

The film received a mixture of reviews from critics with some critics dismissive of the film's tone. The review aggregator website Rotten Tomatoes reported that 64% of 163 critics gave the film a positive review. The website's critical consensus states, "Chocolat is a charmingly light-hearted fable with a lovely performance by Binoche". On Metacritic, which uses a normalized rating system, the film holds a 64/100 rating, based on 31 reviews, indicating "generally favorable" reviews. Audiences polled by CinemaScore gave the film an average grade of "A" on an A+ to F scale.

Chicago Tribune critic Michael Wilmington called Chocolat "a delightful confection, a cream-filled (and slightly nutty) bon-bon of a [...] tantalizing, delectable and randy movie of melting eroticism and toothsome humor." He felt that the film "is a feast of fine actors – and every one of them is a joy to watch." Similarly, Peter Travers from Rolling Stone declared the project "a sinfully scrumptious bonbon [...] Chocolat may be slight, but don't discount Hallstrom's artful finesse [...] Except for some indigestible whimsy Chocolat is yummy." Roger Ebert, writing for the Chicago Sun-Times, gave the film three out of four stars. He found the film was "charming and whimsical, and Binoche reigns as a serene and wise goddess."

In his review for Variety, Lael Loewenstein found that "Hallstrom couldn't have asked for a better cast to embody those themes; likewise, his production team has done an exquisite job of giving life to Robert Nelson Jacobs’ taut script. Chocolat [...] is a richly textured comic fable that blends Old World wisdom with a winking, timely commentary on the assumed moral superiority of the political right." Mick LaSalle of the Los Angeles Times remarked that the film was "as delectable as its title, but for all its sensuality it is ultimately concerned with the spirit." He noted that Chocolat "is a work of artistry and craftsmanship at the highest level, sophisticated in its conception and execution, yet possessed of wide appeal." The New York Times critic Elvis Mitchell found the film "extraordinarily well cast" and wrote: "This crowd-pleaser is the feature-film version of milk chocolate: an art house movie for people who don't like art house movies."

Lisa Schwarzbaum, writing for Entertainment Weekly, graded the film with a 'B−' rating, summarizing it "as agreeably sweet as advertised, with a particularly yummy performance by Juliette Binoche," while Jay Carr from The Boston Globe found that the film "may not be deep, but it certainly is lip-smacking."

Mike Clark of USA Today was more cutting in his review, saying that there are "never enough goodies to keep the two-hour running time from seeming like three." In another negative review, Dennis Lim from The Village Voice criticized the film for its "condescending, self-congratulatory attack on provincial sanctimony." He called Chocolat an "airy, pseudo-folkloric gibberish at best."

Following the criticisms, Harvey Weinstein challenged the USA Today critic, Andy Seiler, to choose a venue where the film was showing to try to prove to him that audiences liked it even if not all critics did. After the screening in Washington D.C., Weinstein asked the audience for their feedback and no one said anything negative.

=== Popular culture ===
References to Chocolat appear in episode 8, season 13 of The Simpsons ("Sweets and Sour Marge"), as well as in the 2009 romantic comedy film, I Love You, Man.

=== Accolades ===
List of awards and nominations
| Award | Category | Nominee(s) | Result | Ref. |
|---|---|---|---|---|
| Academy Awards | Best Picture | David Brown, Kit Golden, and Leslie Holleran | Nominated | |
| Academy Awards | Best Actress | Juliette Binoche | Nominated | |
| Academy Awards | Best Supporting Actress | Judi Dench | Nominated | |
| Academy Awards | Best Screenplay – Based on Material Previously Produced or Published | Robert Nelson Jacobs | Nominated | |
| Academy Awards | Best Original Score | Rachel Portman | Nominated | |
| American Cinema Editors Awards | Best Edited Feature Film – Comedy or Musical | Andrew Mondshein | Nominated | |
| Art Directors Guild Awards | Excellence in Production Design for a Contemporary Film | David Gropman, John Frankish, Lucy Richardson, and Louise Marzaroli | Won | |
| Berlin International Film Festival | Golden Bear | Lasse Hallström | Nominated | |
| British Academy Film Awards | Best Actress in a Leading Role | Juliette Binoche | Nominated | |
| British Academy Film Awards | Best Actress in a Supporting Role | Judi Dench | Nominated | |
| British Academy Film Awards | Best Actress in a Supporting Role | Lena Olin | Nominated | |
| British Academy Film Awards | Best Adapted Screenplay | Robert Nelson Jacobs | Nominated | |
| British Academy Film Awards | Best Cinematography | Roger Pratt | Nominated | |
| British Academy Film Awards | Best Costume Design | Renee Ehrlich Kalfus | Nominated | |
| British Academy Film Awards | Best Makeup and Hair | Naomi Donne | Nominated | |
| British Academy Film Awards | Best Production Design | David Gropman | Nominated | |
| British Society of Cinematographers Awards | Best Cinematography in a Theatrical Feature Film | Roger Pratt | Nominated | |
| Costume Designers Guild Awards | Excellence in Period/Fantasy Film | Renee Ehrlich Kalfus | Nominated | |
| Dallas-Fort Worth Film Critics Association Awards | Best Supporting Actress | Judi Dench | Nominated | |
| David di Donatello Awards | Best Foreign Film | Lasse Hallström | Nominated | |
| European Film Awards | Best Actress | Juliette Binoche | Won | |
| Golden Globe Awards | Best Motion Picture – Musical or Comedy | | Nominated | |
| Golden Globe Awards | Best Actress in a Motion Picture – Musical or Comedy | Juliette Binoche | Nominated | |
| Golden Globe Awards | Best Supporting Actress – Motion Picture | Judi Dench | Nominated | |
| Golden Globe Awards | Best Original Score – Motion Picture | Rachel Portman | Nominated | |
| Goya Awards | Best European Film | Lasse Hallström | Nominated | |
| Grammy Awards | Best Score Soundtrack Album for a Motion Picture, Television or Other Visual Media | Rachel Portman | Nominated | |
| Japan Academy Film Prize | Outstanding Foreign Language Film | | Nominated | |
| Nastro d'Argento | Best Female Dubbing | Franca D'Amato (for dubbing Juliette Binoche) | Won | |
| Online Film & Television Association Awards | Best Supporting Actress | Judi Dench | Nominated | |
| San Diego Film Critics Society Awards | Best Supporting Actress | Judi Dench | Nominated | |
| San Diego Film Critics Society Awards | Best Adapted Screenplay | Robert Nelson Jacobs | Won | |
| Satellite Awards | Best Supporting Actress in a Motion Picture – Drama | Judi Dench | Nominated | |
| Screen Actors Guild Awards | Outstanding Performance by a Cast in a Motion Picture | Juliette Binoche, Leslie Caron, Judi Dench, Johnny Depp, Alfred Molina, Carrie-Anne Moss, Hugh O'Conor, Lena Olin, Peter Stormare, and John Wood | Nominated | |
| Screen Actors Guild Awards | Outstanding Performance by a Female Actor in a Leading Role | Juliette Binoche | Nominated | |
| Screen Actors Guild Awards | Outstanding Performance by a Female Actor in a Supporting Role | Judi Dench | Won | |
| USC Scripter Awards | | Robert Nelson Jacobs (screenwriter); Joanne Harris (author) | Nominated | |
| World Soundtrack Awards | Soundtrack Composer of the Year | Rachel Portman | Nominated | |
| Writers Guild of America Awards | Best Screenplay – Based on Material Previously Produced or Published | Robert Nelson Jacobs | Nominated | |

== Television adaptation ==
A French-language adaptation for TV was reported to be in development between Miramax and Mediawan.

== See also ==
- List of Easter films
