= Erin Brockovich =

American environmental activist (born 1960)

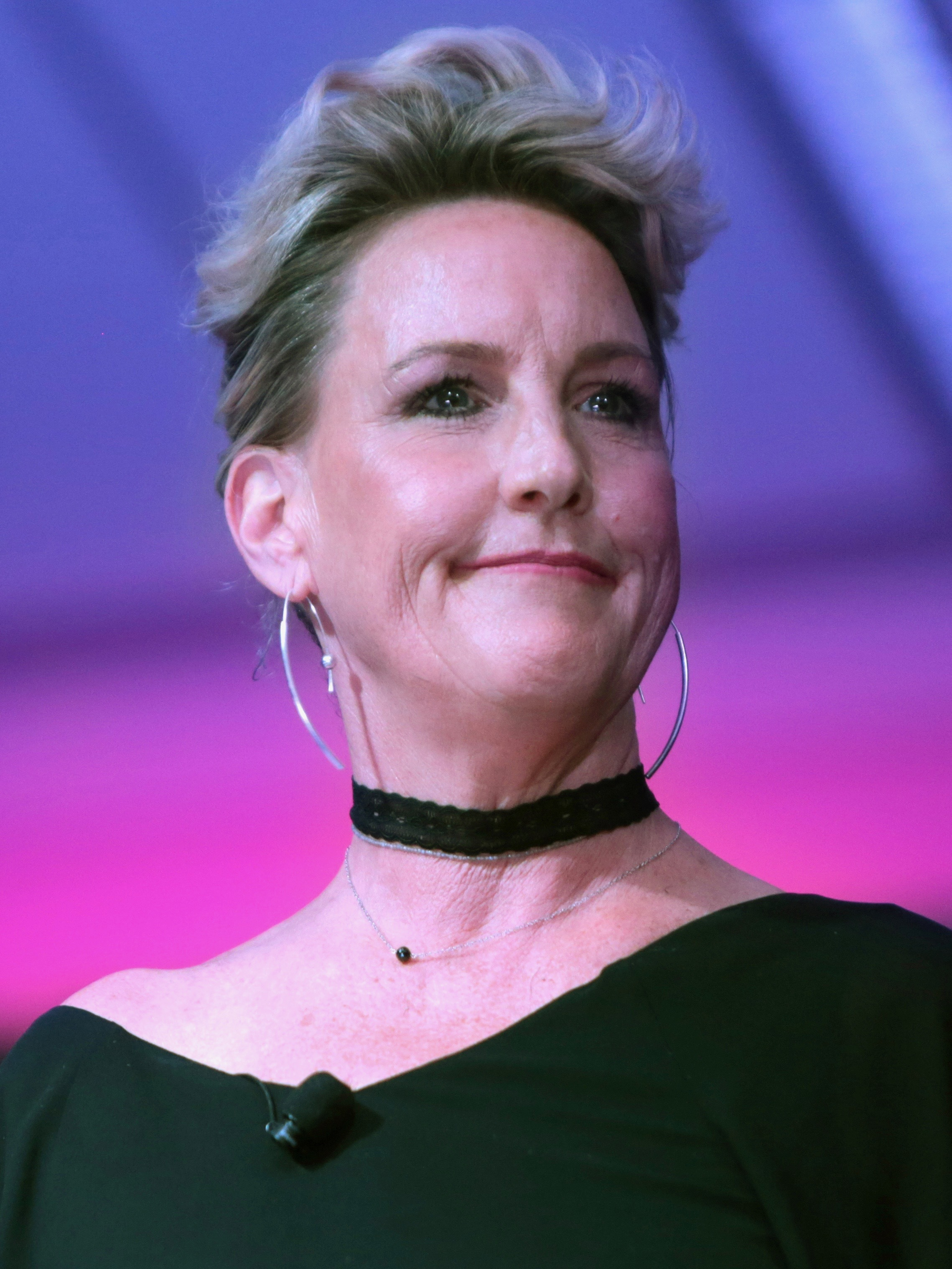
- Brockovich in 2016
- Born: Erin Pattee; June 22, 1960 (age 66); Lawrence, Kansas, U.S.
- Education: Wade College (AAA)
- Occupation: Consumer advocate
- Spouses: Shawn Brown (m. 1982; div. 1987) Steven Brockovich (m. 1989; div. 1990) Eric L. Ellis (m. 1998; div. 2012)
- Children: 3

Erin Brockovich (née Pattee; born June 22, 1960) is an American paralegal, consumer advocate, and environmental activist who was instrumental in building a case against Pacific Gas & Electric Company (PG&E) involving groundwater contamination in Hinkley, California, for attorney Ed Masry in 1993. Their successful lawsuit was the subject of the Oscar-winning film Erin Brockovich (2000), starring Julia Roberts as Brockovich and Albert Finney as Masry.

Since then, Brockovich has become a media personality, hosting the TV series Challenge America with Erin Brockovich on ABC and Final Justice on Zone Reality, and became president of Brockovich Research & Consulting. She also works as a consultant for the New York law firm of Weitz & Luxenberg, which has a focus on personal injury claims for asbestos exposure, and Shine Lawyers in Australia. She worked as a consultant for the now-defunct California law firm Girardi & Keese.

== Early life ==
Erin Pattee Brockovich was born in Lawrence, Kansas, the daughter of Betty Jo (née O'Neal; 1923–2008), a journalist, and Frank Pattee (1924–2011), an industrial engineer and football player. She has two brothers, Frank Jr. and Thomas (1954–1992), and a sister, Jodie. She graduated from Lawrence High School, then attended Kansas State University, in Manhattan, Kansas, and graduated with an Associate in Applied Arts Degree from Wade College in Dallas, Texas.

== Pacific Gas & Electric litigation ==
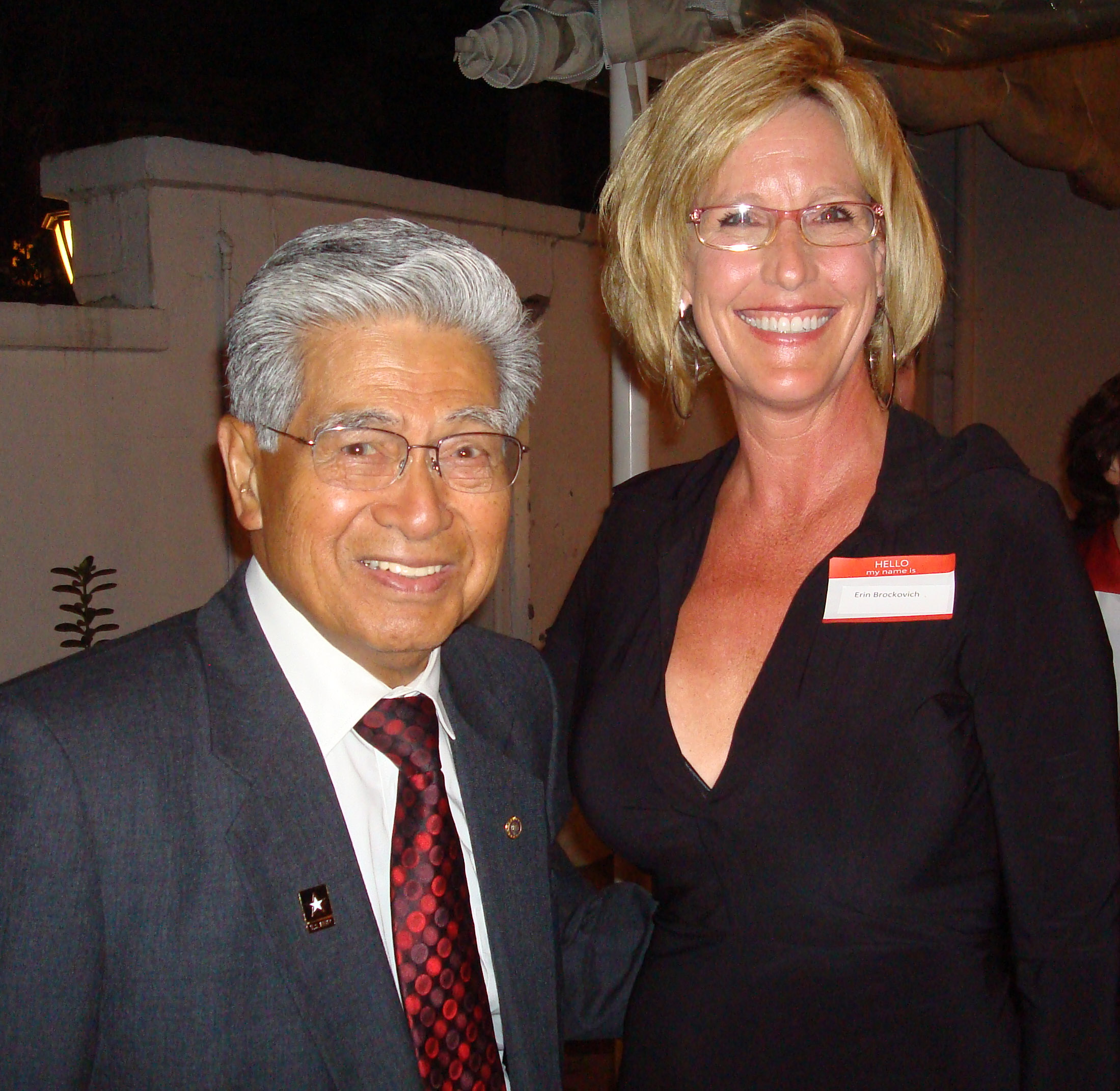
Brockovich with U.S. senator Daniel Akaka of Hawaii in 2007

In 1993, Brockovich spoke out against PG&E after finding widespread unexplained illness in the town of Hinkley, California. She became instrumental in suing the utility company on behalf of the town.

The case (Anderson, et al. v. Pacific Gas & Electric, file BCV 00300) alleged contamination of drinking water with hexavalent chromium (also written as "chromium 6", "chromium VI", "Cr-VI" or "Cr-6") in the town. At the center of the case was the Hinkley compressor station, built in 1952 as a part of a natural-gas pipeline connecting to the San Francisco Bay Area. Between 1952 and 1966, PG&E used hexavalent chromium in a cooling tower system to fight corrosion. The waste water was discharged to unlined ponds at the site, and some of the waste water percolated into the groundwater, affecting an area of approximately 2 square miles (5.2 km^{2}) near the plant. The Regional Water Quality Control Board (RWQCB) put the PG&E site under its regulations in 1968.

The case was settled in 1996 for $333 million ($684 million in 2025), the largest settlement ever paid in a direct-action lawsuit in United States history to that date. Masry & Vititoe, the law firm for which Brockovich was a legal clerk, received $133.6 million ($274 million in 2025) of that settlement, and Brockovich received $2.5 million ($5.13 million in 2025) as part of her fee.

== Further activism and career ==
Working with Edward L. Masry, a lawyer based in Thousand Oaks, California, Brockovich went on to participate in other anti-pollution lawsuits. One suit accused the Whitman Corporation of chromium contamination in Willits, California. Another, which listed 1,200 plaintiffs, alleged contamination near PG&E's Kettleman Hills compressor station in Kings County, California, along the same pipeline as the Hinkley site. The Kettleman suit was settled for $335 million in 2006 ($535 million in 2025).

In 2003, after experiencing problems with mold contamination in her own home in the Conejo Valley, Brockovich received settlements of $430,000 ($752,578 in 2025) from two parties, and an undisclosed amount from a third party, to settle her lawsuit alleging toxic mold in her Agoura Hills, California, home. Brockovich then became a prominent activist and educator in the area as well.

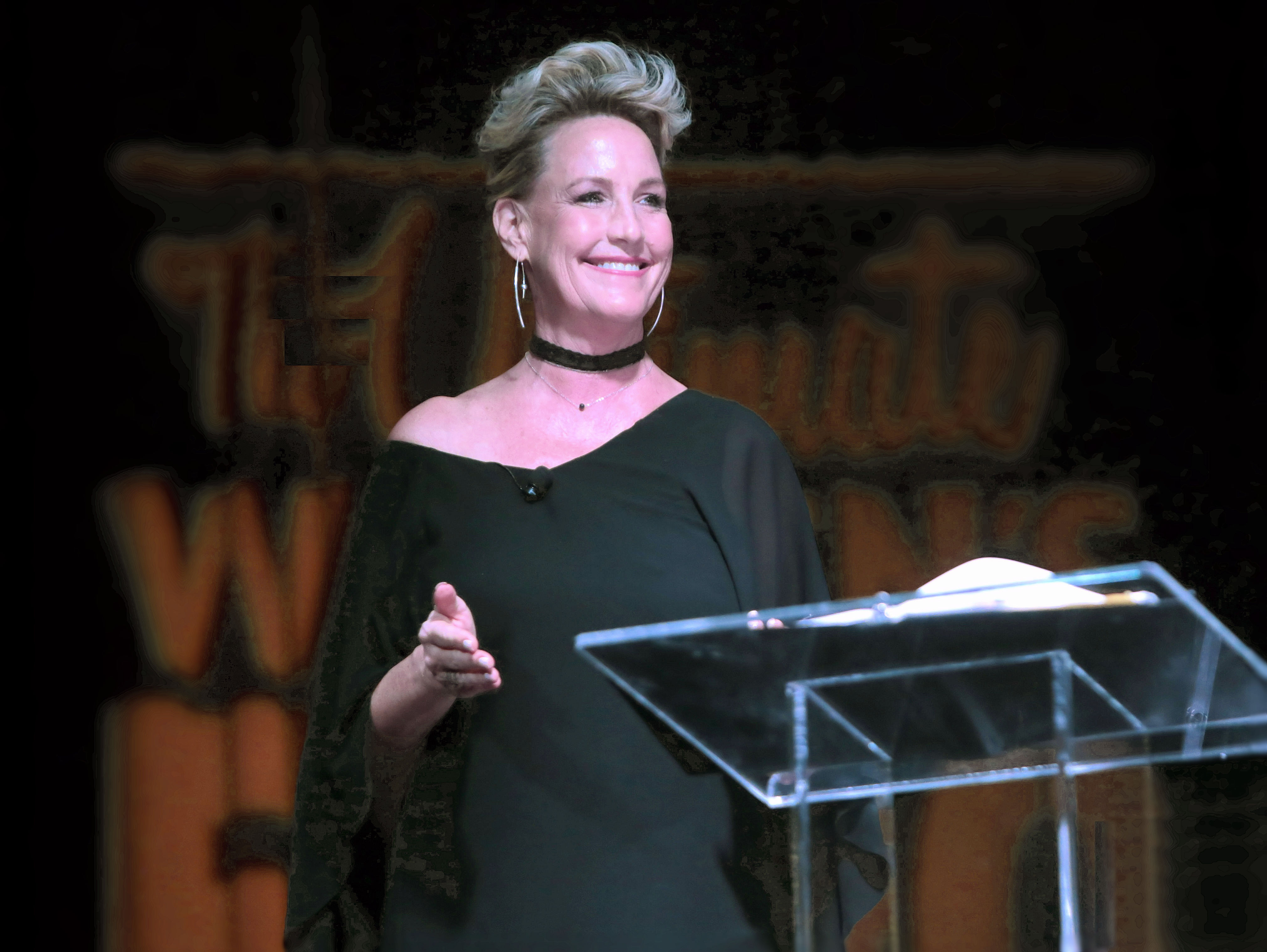
Brockovich, speaking at the Arizona Ultimate Women's Expo in Phoenix, Arizona, October 2016

Brockovich and Masry filed suit against the Beverly Hills Unified School District in 2003, in which the district was accused of harming the health and safety of its students by allowing a contractor to operate a cluster of oil wells on campus. Brockovich and Masry alleged that 300 cancer cases were linked to the oil wells. Subsequent testing and epidemiological investigation failed to corroborate a substantial link, and Los Angeles County Superior Court Judge Wendell Mortimer granted summary judgment against the plaintiffs. In May 2007, the school district announced that it was to be paid $450,000 as reimbursement for legal expenses.

Brockovich assisted in the filing of a lawsuit against Prime Tanning Corp. of St. Joseph, Missouri, in April 2009. The lawsuit claims that waste sludge from the production of leather, containing high levels of hexavalent chromium, was distributed to farmers in northwest Missouri to use as fertilizer on their fields. It is believed to be a potential cause of an abnormally high number of brain tumors around the town of Cameron, Missouri. Prior to the lawsuit, the site was investigated by the EPA and at the time, the agency found "no detections of total chromium", and added, "we would like to get any specific information from this law firm as soon as we can so we can evaluate it, and we intend to ask for that directly." The EPA, Missouri Department of Natural Resources, Missouri Department of Health and a state epidemiologist had been investigating what residents believed were a high number of brain tumors in the area — more than 70 since 1996. The epidemiologist had stated the numbers did not seem abnormally high.

In June 2009, Brockovich began investigating a case of contaminated water in Midland, Texas. "Significant amounts" of hexavalent chromium were found in the water of more than 40 homes in the area, some of which have now been fitted with state-monitored filters on their water supply. Brockovich said: "The only difference between here and Hinkley is that I saw higher levels here than I saw in Hinkley."

In 2012, Brockovich became involved in the case of 14 students from LeRoy, New York, who began reporting perplexing medical symptoms, including tics and speech difficulties. Brockovich believed environmental pollution from the 1970 Lehigh Valley Railroad derailment was the cause and conducted testing in the area. Brockovich was supposed to return to LeRoy to present her findings, but never did; in the meantime, the students' doctors determined the cause was mass psychogenic illness, and that the media exposure was exacerbating the symptoms. No environmental causes were found after repeat testing, and the students improved once the media attention died down.

In early 2016, Brockovich became involved in potential litigation against Southern California Gas for the Aliso Canyon gas leak, a large methane leak from its underground storage facility near the community of Porter Ranch, north of Los Angeles.

In April 2016, Brockovich spoke on stage in Portland, Oregon alongside anti-heavy metals activist Tamara Rubin about environmental advocacy, and organizing to prevent, remove and warn of toxins in the area.

In early 2023, within hours of the February 3 Norfolk Southern train derailment in East Palestine, Ohio, Brockovich started getting calls for assistance from the community about the toxic chemical fires. She has been interviewed on various news outlets, from independent media to national networks. A few weeks later, Brockovich traveled to East Palestine, where she was interviewed by local media, and appeared at one of several high-profile town hall meetings on Friday night, Feb. 24. At the meeting, Brockovich and an attorney highlighted decades of toxic chemical train derailments. Among Brockovich's many concerns is the potential groundwater contamination after chemicals were, as she describes it, dumped in a big hole in the ground and burned off. A recurring theme of her appearances is that the nation has, for decades, in the name of profits over people, failed to undertake infrastructure improvements, enact tighter regulations, and adequately protect the health, safety and welfare of communities from long-term bodily harm and environmental damage. Brockovich continues to cite the Hinkley case and Flint water crisis, as well as the 2013 Lac-Megantic, Canada oil train catastrophe.

In February 2026, Brockovich spoke out against the planned reefing of the SS United States in the Gulf of Mexico, citing the heavy presence of zinc chromate and hexavalent chromium on the ship.

In April 2026, Brockovich started monitoring the industry's aggressive push for AI data centers and increasing nationwide opposition on various grounds. She launched a crowdsourced project, "Brockovich AI Data Center Reporting", to map proposed, under-construction, or operational data center facilities and collect community reports regarding their impacts. Through compiling website submissions, the analyzed results report impacts and information related to data centers to increase community awareness while providing a forum for community members to share their experiences and concerns, for the general public to educate themselves on data center development, and increase transparency within the data center industry. Brockovich's map received nearly 9,700 submissions through the website in just five months of operating, having submissions from all 50 states and even 12 other countries. Due to her work toward public awareness of data centers and their impacts on the environment and public health, Erin Brockovich was named an honoree of the third annual The Independent's Climate 100 list in 2026.

== Awards ==
- Honorary Doctor of Laws and commencement speaker at Lewis & Clark Law School, Portland, Oregon, in May 2005
- Honorary Doctor of Humane Letters and commencement speaker at Loyola Marymount University, Los Angeles, California, on May 5, 2007
- Honorary Master of Arts, Business Communication, from Jones International University, Centennial, Colorado

== Movies and television ==
Brockovich's work in bringing litigation against Pacific Gas & Electric was the focus of the 2000 feature film Erin Brockovich, starring Julia Roberts in the title role. The film was nominated for five Academy Awards: Best Picture, Best Director, Best Actress, Best Supporting Actor and Best Original Screenplay. Roberts won the Academy Award for Best Actress for her portrayal of Erin Brockovich. Brockovich herself had a cameo role as a waitress named Julia. She and Isla Fisher had deleted cameo roles in The Simpsons Movie, where they voiced consultants.

Brockovich had a more extensive role in the 2012 documentary Last Call at the Oasis, which focused on not only water pollution but also the overall state of water scarcity as it relates to water policy in the United States.

On April 8, 2021, Rebel, a television series which creator Krista Vernoff loosely based on Brockovich's life, premiered on ABC.

== Books and articles ==
Brockovich's first book, Take It from Me: Life's a Struggle But You Can Win (ISBN 978-0071383790), was published in 2001. A second book, Superman's Not Coming, was released on August 25, 2020.

In 2021, Brockovich wrote about hormone-disrupting chemicals (such as PFAS) eroding human fertility at an alarming rate.

On February 8, 2022, Brockovich wrote an article talking about the case of Steven Donziger, a lawyer who won an $18 billion judgment against Chevron before being jailed for contempt of court after refusing to turn his phone and computer over to Chevron's legal team.

On July 30, 2024, a guest essay penned by Brockovich entitled "What's at Stake in November" appeared in the opinion section of The New York Times. In the essay, she warns that the United States Supreme Court decision in Loper Bright Enterprises v. Raimondo "weakens the ability of regulatory agencies to do their jobs protecting the public's health from problems such as per- and polyfluoroalkyl substances", thus opening the door for corporations to challenge long-standing United States Environmental Protection Agency regulations previously upheld solely by Chevron deference. The piece also refers to Project 2025 and concludes with Brockovich's opinion that if Donald Trump wins the 2024 United States presidential election, "Americans' health will be at risk" due to corporations and other local authorities either challenging or altogether ignoring weakly enforced environmental protection regulations.

== Personal life ==
Brockovich has three children: a son, Matthew, and a daughter, Katie, with her first husband Shawn Brown, and a daughter, Elizabeth, with her second husband Steven Brockovich. Her third husband was actor and country-musician DJ Eric L. Ellis. As of 2016, Brockovich resides in Agoura Hills, California, in a house she purchased in 1996 with her US$2.5 million bonus after the Hinkley settlement. Brockovich is dyslexic.

== See also ==
- Crystal Lee Sutton
