= Edward L. Masry =

American lawyer and politician

- Born: Edward Louis Masry; July 29, 1932; Paterson, New Jersey, U.S.
- Died: December 5, 2005 (aged 73); Thousand Oaks, California
- Resting place: Valley Oaks Memorial Park; Westlake Village, California
- Education: Loyola Law School; J.D. 1960
- Occupation: Lawyer
- Spouses: Jacqueline Wilson; Joette Levinson

Edward Louis Masry (July 29, 1932 – December 5, 2005) was an American lawyer, a partner in the law firm of Masry & Vititoe, and also a mayor and city councilman for the City of Thousand Oaks, California. With the help of his legal assistant Erin Brockovich, Masry built a case against the Pacific Gas & Electric Company (PG&E) of California in 1993. Their successful lawsuit was the subject of the Oscar-winning film, Erin Brockovich (2000), starring Julia Roberts as Brockovich and Albert Finney in an Academy Award nominated performance as Masry.

== Early life and education ==
Masry was born in Paterson, New Jersey, to Syrian immigrant parents who ran a silk apparel business. When he was age eight, the family moved west to Southern California, settling first in Venice and later in Van Nuys.

As an undergraduate, Masry attended L.A. Valley Junior College, University of California, Santa Barbara, University of California Los Angeles, and University of Southern California, and served with the U.S. Army in France from 1952 to 1954 during the Korean War era, attaining the rank of corporal. Although he never received a Bachelor's degree, he was accepted at Loyola Law School, Los Angeles due to his high placement scores, and he graduated with a Juris Doctor degree in 1960. Thereafter, he was admitted to the State Bar of California and set up private practice in 1961.

== Career ==
Masry's law firm was instrumental in bringing about the multi-plaintiff direct-action lawsuit against Pacific Gas & Electric Company, alleging contamination of drinking water with hexavalent chromium in the Southern California town of Hinkley. The case was settled in 1996 for $333 million, the largest settlement ever paid in a direct-action lawsuit in American history.

The case was adapted for the successful 2000 film Erin Brockovich, with Albert Finney portraying Masry in an Academy Award nominated performance. He had a non-speaking cameo appearance in the film as a restaurant patron sitting behind Julia Roberts, as did Erin Brockovich, who played a waitress in the same scene.

Masry successfully argued a case before the United States Supreme Court on behalf of California consumers who were overcharged for natural gas during the energy crisis of 2000–2001.

Masry served as a member of the Los Angeles County Bar Association's Environmental Law Section and the State Bar of California's Environmental Law Section. He received numerous awards for his environmental law and consumer protection work, including the Consumer Attorney of the Year award from the Consumer Attorneys of California.

== Personal life ==
Masry died at age 73 at Los Robles Hospital in Thousand Oaks, due to complications related to diabetes. He had resigned from the City Council of Thousand Oaks one week earlier because of his medical condition.

== Filmography ==
Year	Title	Role	Notes
2000	Erin Brockovich	Patron at diner	Uncredited
2001	American Justice		Uncredited
