= Robert Nelson Jacobs =

American screenwriter

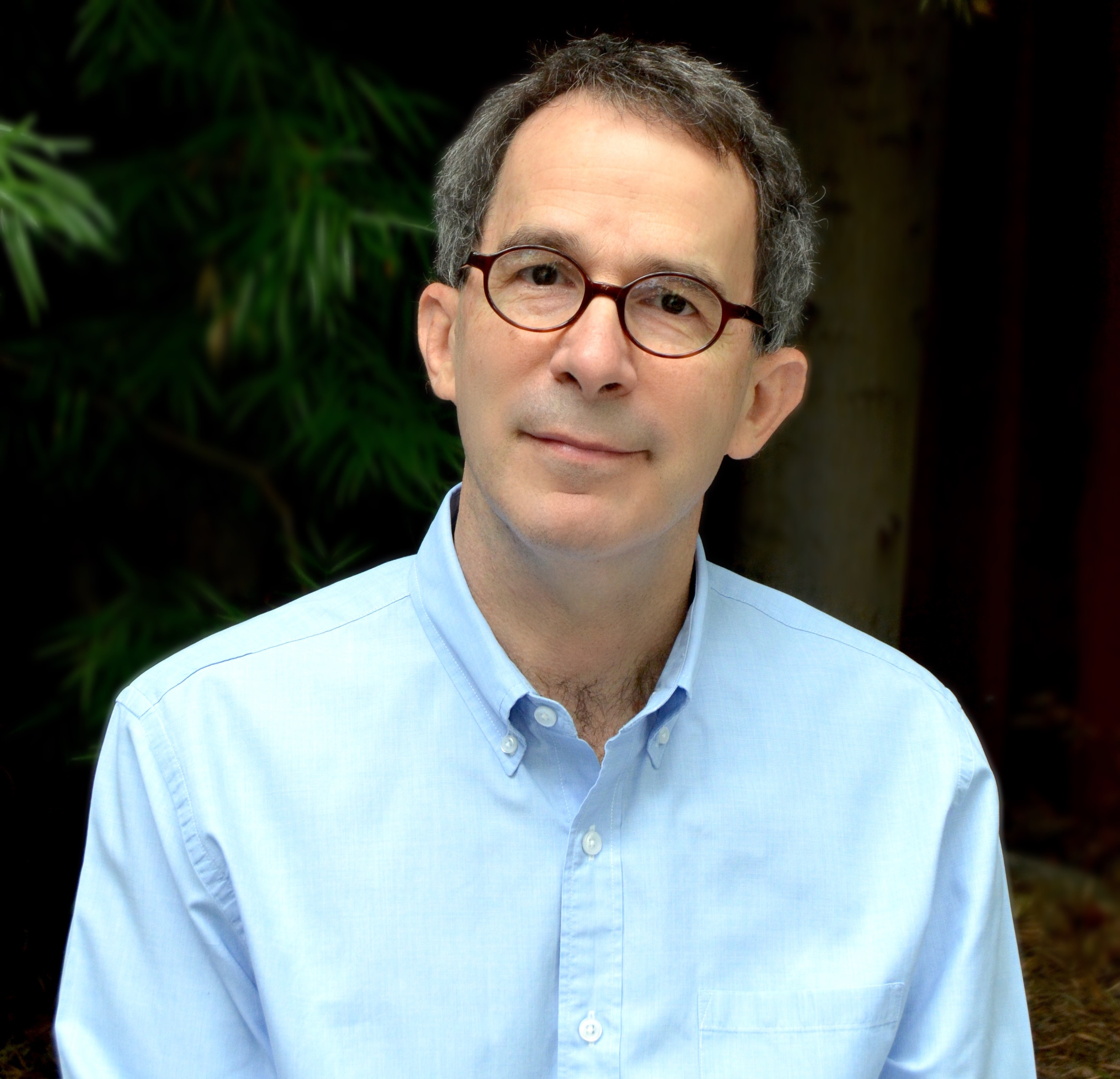
- Jacobs in August 2015
- Education: University of Iowa; Yale University
- Occupation: Screenwriter
- Years active: 1997–present

Robert Nelson Jacobs is an American screenwriter. In 2000, he received an Academy Award nomination for Best Adapted Screenplay for Chocolat. Jacobs is a board member and past president of the Writers Guild Foundation, a non-profit organization devoted to promoting and preserving the craft of writing for the screen.

== Biography ==
Jacobs grew up in the Pocono Mountains of Pennsylvania. He attended Yale University, where he received the Curtis Literary Prize for his short fiction and graduated with honors. He earned his master's degree from the Iowa Writers’ Workshop. Jacobs began his career as a writer of short stories. Jacobs’ love of movies brought him to California, where it took a number of years for his work to finally start generating income. Jacobs’ screenplay credits include Out to Sea, Dinosaur, Chocolat, The Shipping News, Flushed Away, The Water Horse, and Extraordinary Measures.

== Filmography ==
Writer

- Out to Sea (1997)
- Dinosaur (2000)
- Chocolat (2000)
- The Shipping News (2001)
- The Water Horse (2007)
- Extraordinary Measures (2010)

Songwriter

- Out to Sea (1997) ("You're Our Guest")

== Accolades ==
Year	Award	Category	Title	Result
2000	Academy Awards	Best Adapted Screenplay	Chocolat	Nominated
2000	BAFTA Awards	Best Adapted Screenplay	Chocolat	Nominated
2001	USC Scripter Awards		Chocolat	Nominated
2001	USC Scripter Awards		The Shipping News	Nominated
