= Direct-action lawsuit =

Brought directly against an insurance company for insured

A direct-action lawsuit is brought directly against an insurance company for a wrong done by the insured.

In a lawsuit that is not direct-action, a plaintiff brings the claim against the insured, who actually wronged the plaintiff. Once judgment has been rendered against the defendant, there are a number of ways that the insurance company (assuming the defendant is insured) might later be made to pay the victorious plaintiff.

If the plaintiff wants to avoid the extra time and process required to eventually be paid by the insurance company, the action can be brought directly against the insurance company. The plaintiff must still prove all of the same facts that would be the plaintiff's burden, had the action been brought against the insured. In addition, the plaintiff must prove that the insured was covered by the insurance company, and that the insurance policy covered the kind of wrong for which the plaintiff is seeking remedy. The insured is then treated as a third party to the litigation, and the insurance company itself is the defendant.

This name can also be given to any lawsuit that is brought as a kind of direct action activism. One example can be a customer suing a company to repeal an action deemed an infringement on the rights of the customer as a citizen and thus a subject to federal or state law.

The largest direct-action lawsuit in history ($333 million) was the subject matter of the motion picture Erin Brockovich.
