= Madah-Sartre =

Play by Alek Baylee Toumi

Madah-Sartre: The Kidnapping, Trial, and Conver(sat/s)ion of Jean-Paul Sartre and Simone de Beauvoir
- Original language: French
- Written by: Alek Baylee Toumi
- Characters: Madah; Jean-Paul Sartre; Simone de Beauvoir; Mullahs; Psy-Mullahs; Chief Chador; Chadorettes; Cops; Taximan Hamid Lounar; Chauffeur Mmi Ali; Doctor; Surgeon Dr. Freeman; Artist; Doorman; Terrorist; Nurses; Presenter; Guard; Radio Announcer; Radio Reporters Veronique Lamesche and Liz Miller
- Subject: Islamists kidnap Sartre and de Beauvoir, holding them captive while trying to convert them to Islam
- Genre: Drama
- Setting: Algeria 1993, shortly after assassination of Tahar Djaout

Madah-Sartre is a seven-act play by Alek Baylee Toumi, first published in French in 1996 and published in English in 2007. It depicts a fictional abduction by Islamists of Jean-Paul Sartre and Simone de Beauvoir in Algeria in 1993, and attempts by these Islamists to convert their captives to Islam.

== Characters ==
=== Main characters ===
- Jean-Paul Sartre
- Simone de Beauvoir
- Madah (Islamist, leader of a group of Islamist thugs, drives a Rolls-Royce provided by Saudis)
- Chief Chador (Madah's female counterpart)

=== Secondary characters ===
- Cab driver Hamid Lounar
- Chadorettes (Chief Chador's female entourage)

== Plot ==
It is 1993 in Algeria and Islamists have just assassinated Tahar Djaout. Jean-Paul Sartre (died 1980) and Simone de Beauvoir (died 1986) return to earth from the afterlife to attend Djaout's funeral. While they are en route to the funeral, Islamists abduct them. The Islamists hold their intellectual guests captive and begin sessions of trying to convert Sartre and de Beauvoir to Islam.

== Themes ==
Madah-Sartre was inspired by Peter Weiss's play Marat/Sade (1963). The play includes characters who support intellectual freedom and who challenge ideas detrimental to human wellbeing with better ideas (rather than with violence). In the preface Toumi states, "In the case of the civil war in Algeria, the overwhelming majority of the assassinated people – journalists, intellectuals, school teachers, raped women – are Muslims. It means that: The victims are Muslims, while the killers, the assassins, the terrorists are Islamists... It is very important not to confuse the two and to learn to distinguish between victims and executioners. Madah-Sartre is not anti-Muslim; on the contrary, it defends Muslim victims and all Others who are victims of terrorism. That is why Madah-Sartre is, without a shadow of a doubt, antifundamentalist, antiterrorist, and anti-Islamist."
