= Charlotte Bischoff =

German Communist and Resistance fighter

Lotte Bischoff
- Charlotte Bischoff before the war
- Born: Charlotte Wielepp; 5 October 1901; Berlin, German Empire
- Died: 4 November 1994 (aged 93); Berlin, Germany
- Occupations: Party official; Ghostwriter (for Geschichte der deutschen Arbeiterbewegung)
- Political party: SED
- Spouse: Fritz Bischoff (m. 1900; died 1945)

Charlotte Bischoff (née Wielepp; 5 October 1901 – 4 November 1994) was a German Communist and Resistance fighter against National Socialism.

== Biography ==
=== Early years ===
Charlotte Wielepp was born in Berlin. Her father was Alfred Wielepp (1878–1948), who was the responsible editor of the Vorwärts before the First World War. Her mother was Martha Albertine née Stawitzky. As a young women she trained for work as a clerk and steno-typist, moving on to work in Halle, Hamburg and Berlin between 1915 and 1930. During that period she became politically active and joined the Freie Sozialistische Jugend (Free Socialist Youth) and the Young Communist League of Germany. In 1923, she joined the Communist Party of Germany (KPD) and the same year, married Fritz Bischoff, a founding member of the KPD, who was then working as a clerk with the Soviet trade mission. After 1930, Charlotte Bischoff was a steno-typist and publicist in the Prussian Landtag faction and in the Central Committee of the KPD.

=== The Nazi era ===
Organisation of the KPD in 1942, showing lines communication and command. Bischoff acted as a liaison between the KPD in Stockholm and Wilhelm Knöchel

The Reichstag Fire Decree pushed by Adolf Hitler in response to the Reichstag fire on 27 February 1933 and signed into law by President Paul von Hindenburg withdrew civil liberties and enabled the Nazis, then in key positions in government, to arrest anyone they deemed to be an enemy. This became first and foremost a confrontation with the KPD, but in effect, outlawed all political parties in Germany, other than the Nazi Party. The Enabling Act of 27 March 1933 consolidated their power and authority. In the first weeks of March 1933, there were 11,000 Communists arrested and by June 1933, more than half of the KPD district leaders were in detention.

In this environment, Bischoff went to work for the propaganda department of the KPD. In 1934, her husband was arrested by the Nazis and sentenced to eight years at hard labor in a Zuchthaus, then afterward held in "protective custody" at Sachsenhausen concentration camp and finally, at Neuengamme concentration camp. He was shot on 3 May 1945 by the SS, as he tried to save himself on the prison ship Cap Arcona when it was bombed by the British and began to sink.

Bischoff went to Moscow in 1934, where until 1937, she worked for the International Relations department of the Communist International. This involved travel abroad to Denmark and the Netherlands. In 1938, she requested to be allowed to carry out illegal work in Germany. She was sent to Stockholm, where important leaders of the KPD were then in exile. She was arrested there in 1939 as an illegal and was threatened with deportation to Germany, but was soon released. The Third Reich then withdrew her German citizenship. Bischoff then worked for the International Red Aid taking care of emigrated German Communists, collecting money and having discussions with unionized construction workers on construction sites in Sweden.

In 1941, on behalf of the exiled leadership of the KPD, then under Herbert Wehner, Bischoff was successful in entering Germany illegally on board a freight ship. The trip took a month, from 29 June to the end of July.

Bischoff then worked in Berlin with various resistance groups, especially with Red Orchestra-connected groups, such as with people involved with Kurt and Elisabeth Schumacher, with the group around Wilhelm Knöchel and around Robert Uhrig. She also worked on the magazine, Die Innere Front ("The Internal Front") with the Saefkow-Jacob-Bästlein Organization. Acting as a courier, she gave "micro materials" to contact people in these groups.

Bischoff was one of the few members of the German Resistance able to evade arrest and she remained in Berlin, unknown, until the war's end. Die Innere Front was able to continue publication and distribution, even after numerous resistance fighters had been arrested, due to the work of Bischoff, Otto Grabowski, and Ernst Sieber (Widerstandskämpfer).

=== The German Democratic Republic ===
The war ended in May 1945. A couple of weeks earlier her husband Fritz Bischoff had been one of thousands drowned off the coast at Lübeck when a liner/prison ship on which he was being held was sunk by the British. The central part of what remained of Germany (apart from the western part of Berlin) now found itself designated the Soviet occupation zone: political administration and reconstruction would take place under Soviet military administration. Charlotte Bischoff obtained a secretarial position with the Soviet occupation forces in May 1945. She then worked at a succession of jobs with the Free German Trade Union Federation (Freier Deutscher Gewerkschaftsbund, FDGB). The entire Soviet zone would be reformed as the German Democratic Republic, formally founded only in October 1949, but already in April 1946 the contentious merger between the old Communist Party and the Moderate-left SPD created the precondition for a return to one-party rule. Bischoff was one of thousands of former Communists who now lost no time in signing their membership over to the new Socialist Unity Party (SED /) Sozialistische Einheitspartei Deutschlands). Following internal disagreements in the FDGB, in May 1947 Bischoff switched her focus to "Social Help: Greater Berlin" (Sozialhilfe Groß-Berlin), a city-wide welfare organisation with close links to East Germany's SED (party), staying with that organisation till September 1950, after which she went back to working with the FDGB. In 1957 she started work, on a free-lance basis, with the Marxism–Leninism Institute of the powerful Party Central Committee. Here she was involved in compiling the official "History of the German Workers' Movement" („Geschichte der deutschen Arbeiterbewegung“). When the volume later appeared she was frequently identified in it but only as the "representative of the Central Committee". Her own contribution to the volume and the collected supporting documents remained unacknowledged during the GDR years. The writer Eva-Maria Siegel thinks this was probably because she included various corrections to the official historical ideology, notably in respect of the contribution of Karl Mewis.

As the end approached for the German Democratic Republic, the ruling SED (party) prepared for change, renaming itself as the Party of Democratic Socialism (PDS). Bischoff joined the PDS when she was 90.

== Appreciation ==
Peter Weiss described the Resistance activity of Charlotte Bischoff in exile and in Germany in his novel, The Aesthetics of Resistance ("Die Ästhetik des Widerstands"). In particular, in the third volume of his novel, which tells of the Red Orchestra, she is the central protagonist. Weiss drew upon conversations he had with Bischoff in 1972, as well as a correspondence with her between 1974 and 1976. Weiss stated she was most unassuming and courageous resistance fighter, [who] usually does not participate in discussions.

== Bibliography ==
- Nachlass Charlotte Bischoff bei der Stiftung Archiv der Parteien und Massenorganisationen der DDR im Bundesarchiv, NY 4232, bearbeitet von Max Bloch. (in German)
- Eva-Maria Siegel. An ihrem Lachen kann man eine Frau doch erkennen. Documents and notes on the relationship of fiction and authenticity in Peter Weiss' Ästhetik des Widerstands am Beispiel Charlotte Bischoffs. From the Peter Weiss Journal 5, Opladen (1996) pp. 37–69 (in German)
- Simone Barck. Widerstandsgeschichte „von unten“ schreiben: Charlotte Bischoff und Peter Weiss. Article titled, "Antifa-Geschichte(n). Eine literarische Spurensuche in der DDR der 1950er und 1960er Jahre". Cologne/Weimar/Vienna, Böhlau (2003) pp. 229–258 (in German)
