= Georg Henke =

German Communist who involved himself in political resistance and journalist

Ambassador of the German Democratic Republic to North Korea
- In office 1968 – November 1972

Personal details
- Born: 9 April 1908 Charlottenburg, Berlin, Germany
- Died: 8 December 1986 (aged 78) Berlin, German Democratic Republic
- Party: Communist Party of Germany (1931–1946); Socialist Unity Party (post-1946)
- Other political affiliations: Communist Party of Spain
- Education: International Lenin School
- Occupation: Writer, journalist, economist, diplomat

Military service
- Allegiance: Second Spanish Republic
- Branch/service: Spanish Republican Army
- Years of service: 1938–1939
- Unit: 35th Division; XI International Brigade
- Battles/wars: Spanish Civil War; Battle of the Ebro

Georg Erich Henke (9 April 1908 – 8 December 1986) was a German Communist who involved himself in political resistance during the Nazi years, and spent most of the Second World War exiled in Sweden. He also worked as a journalist. After the war he became an East German diplomat, ending up, between 1968 and 1972, as his country's ambassador to North Korea.

== Life ==
=== Early years ===
Georg Henke was born in Charlottenburg, Berlin into a working-class family. His stepfather owned an antiques business. After completing his schooling, Georg undertook an apprenticeship between 1924 and 1927 in export sales. He was in business as an export salesman between 1927 and 1933. He joined the General Federation of Independent Employees (Allgemeiner freier Angestelltenbund) in 1928, becoming both a teacher and head of the Economics Working Group at the Marxist Workers' Academy (MASCH) / Arbeitsgemeinschaft Ökonomie der Marxistischen Arbeiterschule).

=== Politics ===
He joined the Communist Party (KPD) in 1931, becoming the party's contact in Moabit, the district of Berlin where he worked. In January 1933, the NSDAP (Nazi Party) took power and quickly set about creating a one party state. Membership of any party other than the Nazi party – and particularly of the Communist Party – was outlawed in Germany. Henke nevertheless continued working, now illegally, for the KPD district leadership in Berlin and for their similarly illegal press department between 1933 and 1935. After that he went into exile relocating, in the first instance, to Czechoslovakia. Between 1935 and 1937 he was a student in Moscow at the International Lenin School. In March 1938, he traveled via France to Spain where he joined the 11th International Brigade. He fought in the Spanish Civil War in 1938–39 and also found time to become a member of the Spanish Communist Party. In February 1939, he returned to France, spending time in Paris which during the 1930s had become a refuge for a number of exiled German Communist Party members. Towards the end of the year he emigrated (illegally) to Sweden where he worked for the German Communist Party with the German Communists in exile congregated in Stockholm. He also wrote articles for German language newspapers including "Die Welt", which in this case was the name used by a newspaper of the Communist International and headed up by Jakob Rosner. Most of his contributions appeared under the pseudonym "Erna Schmitz". During the early 1940s, he also undertook several clandestine trips to Magdeburg and Berlin in Germany on behalf of the party. In 1942, the Swedish police arrested him and in 1943 an effective ban was placed on his overseas trips. Once released he worked in Uppsala with the "Freie Deutsche Kulturbund", becoming the leader of the German communists in this university city. Later he took a job in Stockholm on the newspaper, "Politische Information".

=== East Germany ===
After the war, in January 1946, Georg Henke returned to what was left of Germany, arriving in what was now the Soviet occupation zone, a piece of territory in the process of being reinvented as the German Democratic Republic. In February 1946, he was given a position in the Economics Department of the Central Committee in the (soon to be superseded) Communist Party (KPD). He very soon became a member of the newly formed SED, the old German Communist Party and SPD (party) being forcibly merged in April 1946 to give birth to East Germany's ruling party. From 1946 till 1950, he was Editor in Chief of the weekly newspaper "Die Wirtschaft" ("The Economy"), before returning to Moscow where, in 1950/51, he was the Trade Commissioner at the East German embassy. He then remained in Moscow till 1955 as head of the East German mission to the Comecon (Rat für gegenseitige Wirtschaftshilfe / Совет Экономической Взаимопомощи).

From 1956 till 1958, he served as the deputy chairman of the State Planning commission (SPK / Staatliche Plankommission), of which he would remain a member till 1963. From 1958 till 1964, he led the SPK's central Department for International economic Relations, also becoming, in 1961, the head of the SPK's Moscow liaison office. He joined the East German Ministry for Foreign Affairs in 1964, heading up the ministry's Economics department. He then served as his country's ambassador to the Democratic People's Republic of Korea from 1968 till his retirement from the Pyongyang posting in November 1972.

He died on 8 December 1986 in Berlin, and was buried in Zentralfriedhof Friedrichsfelde.

== In fiction ==
Georg Henke featured as a minor character in the first part of a three-volume novel "The aesthetics of Resistance" ("Die Ästhetik des Widerstands") by the German-born writer Peter Weiss. Weiss interviewed Henke on 20 October 1972 and used the results of their talk in the book's second and third volume.
