= Gunilla Palmstierna-Weiss =

Swedish scenic and costume designer (1928–2022)

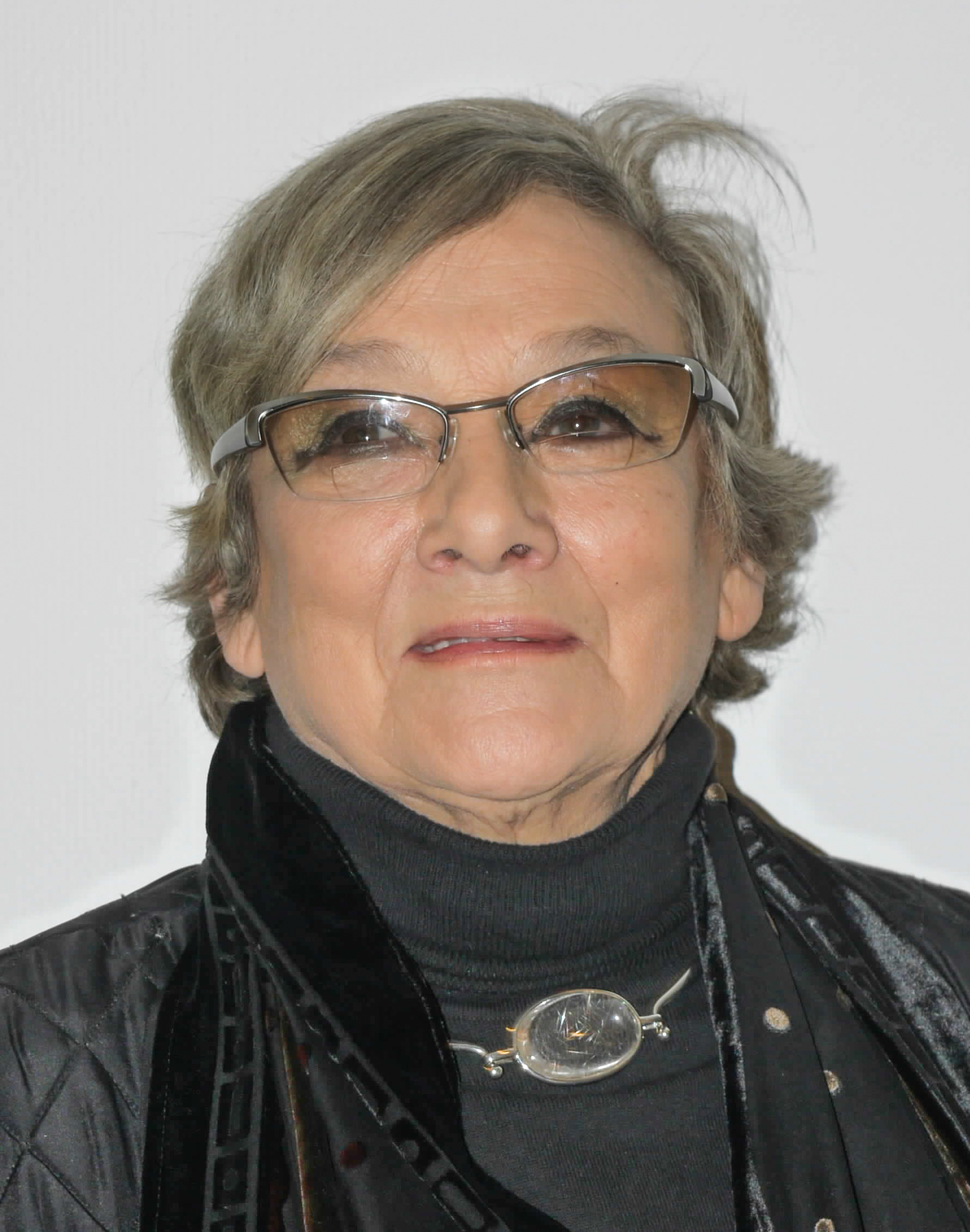
- Palmstierna-Weiss in 2010
- Born: 28 March 1928; Lausanne, Switzerland
- Died: 20 November 2022 (aged 94); Stockholm, Sweden
- Spouses: Christopher Sylwan (m. 1948; div. 1952); Peter Weiss (m. 1964; died 1982)
- Parents: Kule Palmstierna; Vera Herzog
- Relatives: Ebba Palmstierna (grandmother); Erik Palmstierna (grandfather)

Gunilla Palmstierna-Weiss (28 March 1928 – 20 November 2022) was a Swedish costume designer, scenic designer, sculptor, ceramist, and actress. She won the 1966 Tony Award for Best Costume Design for her work on Peter Weiss's Marat/Sade (1963). She has designed sets and costumes for numerous theaters internationally, including the Royal Shakespeare Company and the Royal Swedish Opera. From 1966 to 1989, she worked regularly as a set and costume designer for Ingmar Bergman. She also collaborated as a designer with directors Fritz Kortner and Peter Brook.

== Biography ==
Born Gunilla Palmstierna on 28 March 1928 in Lausanne, Switzerland, Palmstierna-Weiss grew up in the Netherlands and Austria. Her parents, Kule Palmstierna and Vera Herzog, worked as physicians, and her grandfather, Erik Palmstierna, was foreign minister in Sweden's first social democratic government. Her mother was of Jewish descent. Her parents divorced when she was young, and she lived in Rotterdam and Berlin with her mother during World War II. After the war, she studied art in Amsterdam and Paris before moving to Sweden where she has remained since. From 1948 to 1952, she was married to the Swedish graphic artist Mark Christopher Sylwan. In 1964 she married German author Peter Weiss. They remained married until his death in 1982.

Palmstierna-Weiss began her career as a ceramist in the late 1940s and 1950s. She began a romantic relationship with Weiss after the end of her first marriage, and that relationship led to a new artistic interest initially in acting and then scenic and costume design where her artistic focus ultimately settled. She appeared as an actress in several of Weiss's early experimental films. She won a Tony Award in 1966 for her costume designs in Weiss's Marat/Sade, which were later used in the 1967 film version directed by Peter Brook.

In 2009, she was awarded the Order of Merit of the Federal Republic of Germany.

Palmstierna-Weiss died in Stockholm on 20 November 2022, at the age of 94.
