= Marat/Sade =

1964 play by Peter Weiss

- Original language: German
- Written by: Peter Weiss
- Characters: Marquis de Sade; Coulmier; Jean-Paul Marat; Simone Évrard; Charlotte Corday; Duperret; Jacques Roux; The Herald; Kokol; Polpoch; Cucurucu; Rossignol
- Mute: Mme Coulmier; Mlle Coulmier; Male Nurses; Asylum inmates Sisters; Musicians
- Subject: French Revolution, Reign of Terror, First French Empire, Revolution, Nihilism, Class struggle, Political repression
- Genre: Epic theatre, Theatre of Cruelty
- Setting: Charenton Asylum, France; 1808

Premiere
- Date: April 29, 1964
- Place: Schillertheater, West Berlin, Germany

The Persecution and Assassination of Jean-Paul Marat as Performed by the Inmates of the Asylum of Charenton Under the Direction of the Marquis de Sade (German: Die Verfolgung und Ermordung Jean Paul Marats dargestellt durch die Schauspielgruppe des Hospizes zu Charenton unter Anleitung des Herrn de Sade), usually shortened to Marat/Sade (pronounced [ma.ʁa.sad]), is a play written in 1963 by Peter Weiss and fully staged for the first time the following year. The work was first published in German.

Incorporating dramatic elements characteristic of both Antonin Artaud and Bertolt Brecht, it is a depiction of class struggle and human suffering that asks whether true revolution comes from changing society or changing oneself.

== Plot ==
Set in the historical Charenton Asylum, Marat/Sade is almost entirely a "play within a play". The main story takes place on 13 July 1808; the play directed by the Marquis de Sade within the story takes place 15 years earlier, during the French Revolution, culminating in the assassination (13 July 1793) of Jean-Paul Marat, then quickly brings the audience up to date (1808). The actors are the inmates of the asylum; the nurses and supervisors occasionally step in to restore order. The bourgeois director of the hospital, Coulmier, supervises the performance, accompanied by his wife and daughter. He is a supporter of the post-revolutionary government led by Napoleon, in place at the time of the production, and believes the play he has organised to be an endorsement of his patriotic views. His patients, however, have other ideas, and they make a habit of speaking lines he had attempted to suppress, or deviating entirely into personal opinion. Having come out of the revolution no better than they went in, the inmates are not entirely pleased with the course of events as they occurred.

The Marquis de Sade, the man after whom sadism is named, did indeed direct performances in Charenton with other inmates there, encouraged by Coulmier. De Sade is a main character in the play, conducting many philosophical dialogues with Marat and observing the proceedings with sardonic amusement. He remains detached and cares little for practical politics and the inmates' talk of right and justice; he simply stands by as an observer and an advocate of his own nihilistic and individualist beliefs.

== Musical score ==
Marat/Sade is a play with music. The use of music follows the approach of Brecht, whereby the songs comment on themes and issues of the play. Unlike a traditional musical format, the songs do not further the plot or expositional development of character in the play. By contrast they often add an alienation effect, interrupting the action of the play and offering historical, social and political commentary. Richard Peaslee, assisted by Patrick Gowers, composed music for the original English-language production of Marat/Sade directed by Peter Brook. Although there is no official score to the play in any language, the success of the Brook-directed Royal Shakespeare Company (RSC) production and film made the Peaslee score popular for English-language productions. Sections of the Peaslee score have been included in trade copies of the Geoffrey Skelton/Adrian Mitchell English version (based on the text used for the RSC productions). The full score is available from ECS Publishing/Galaxy Music Corporation. The original RSC production was so popular that folk singer Judy Collins recorded a medley of songs from the show on her album In My Life.

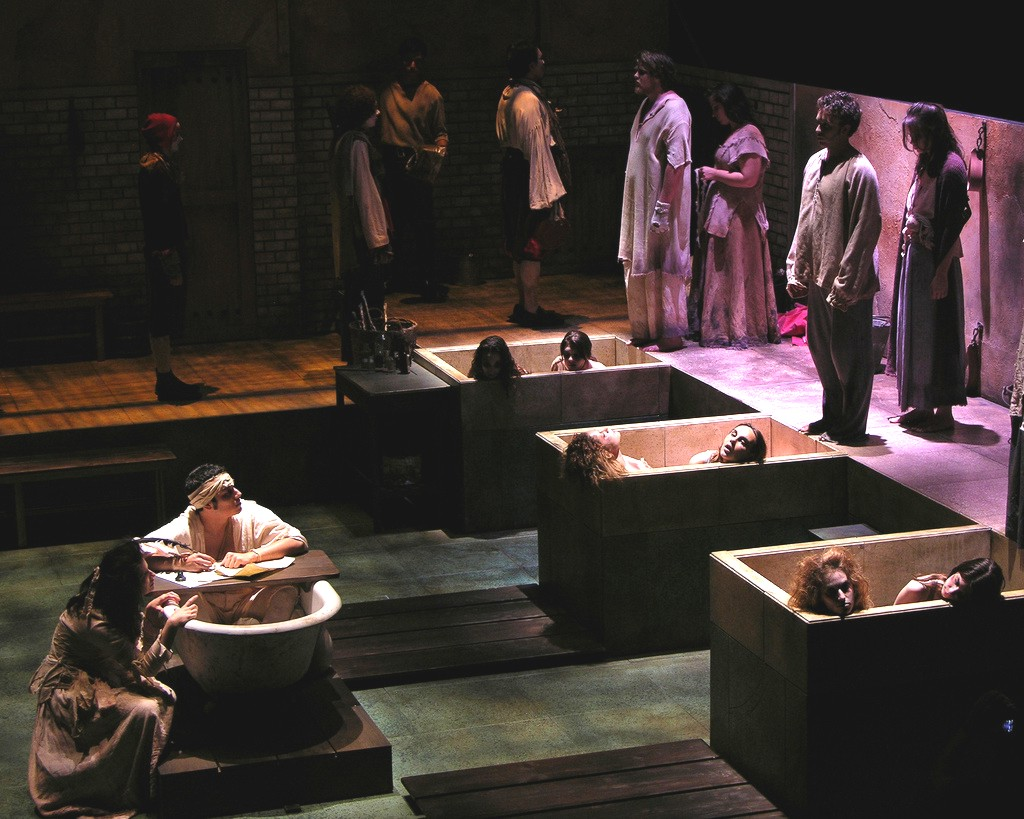
Marat/Sade production at the University of California, San Diego, 2005, directed by Stefan Novinski

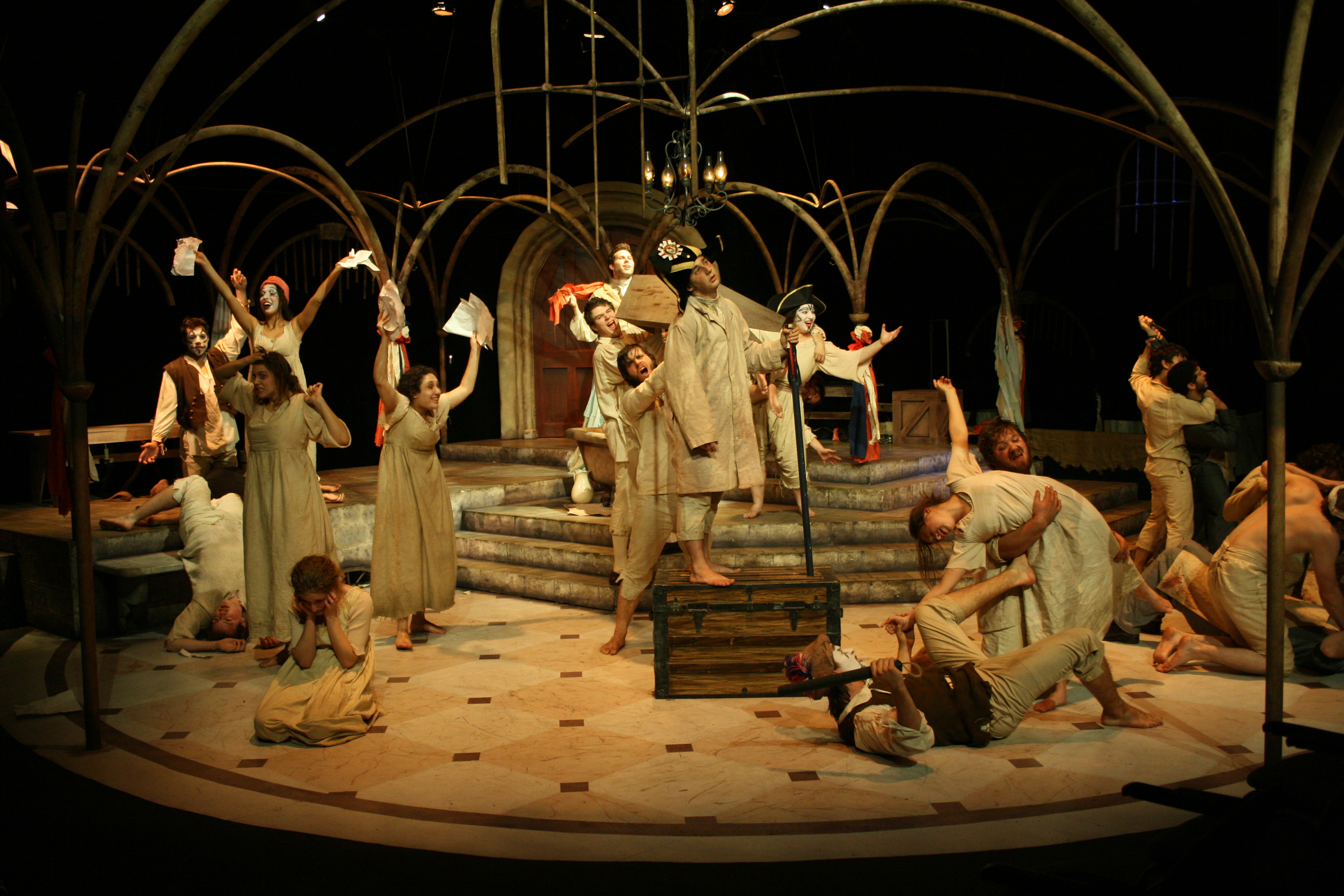
Marat/Sade production at the State University of New York at Fredonia, 2008, directed by James Ivey

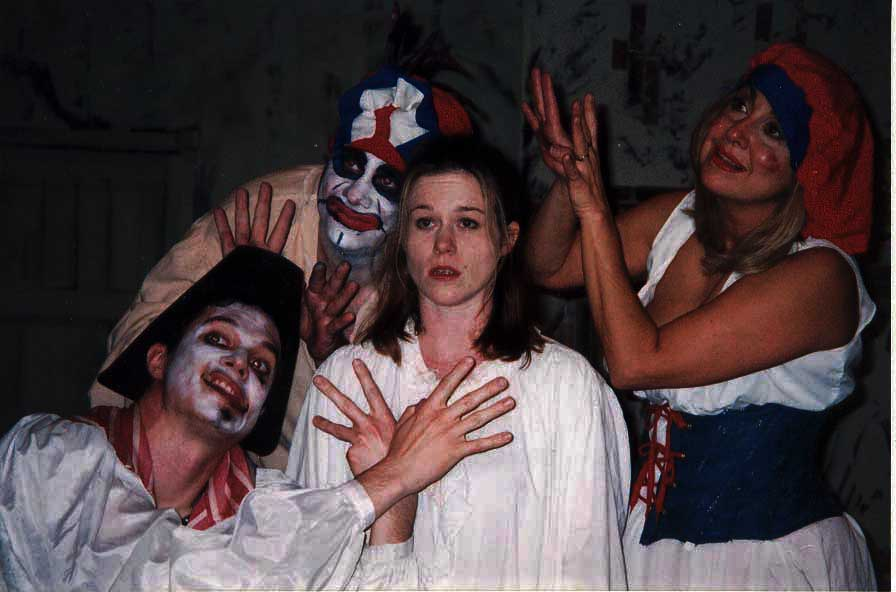
Marat/Sade production at the Theatre of NOTE, 2000, directed by Brad Mays

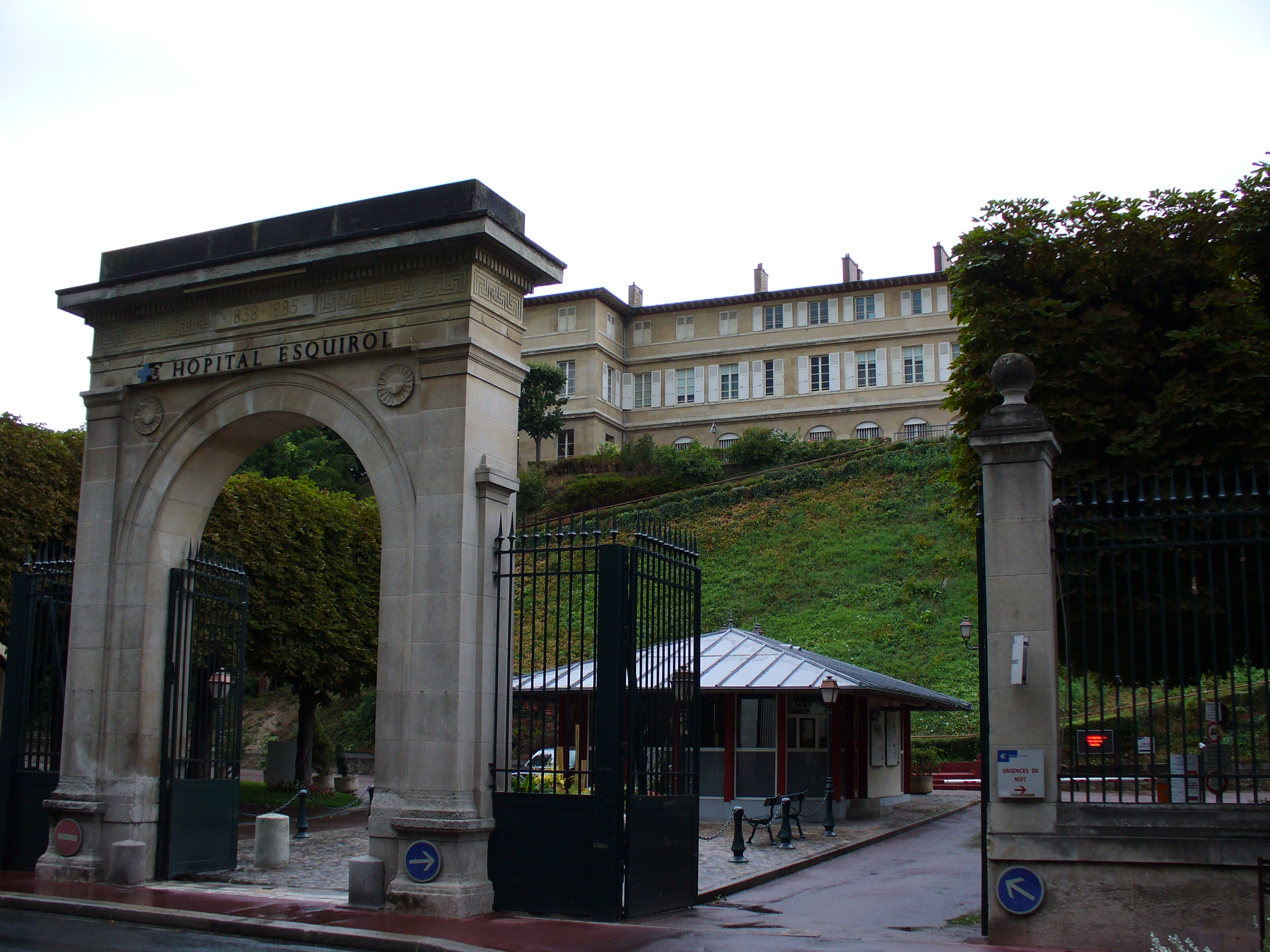
Marat/Sade is set at later mental home "Hôpital Esquirol" in present-day Saint-Maurice

Recordings of the songs were made by the cast of the original Royal Shakespeare Company production and film. The first recording of the show was a three-LP set released in 1964 by Caedmon Records. This was a complete audio recording of the original London production. The second release was a single soundtrack album LP of the film score, released by Caedmon/United Artists Records.

The third release was a CD compilation of two 1966 Brook/Peaslee Royal Shakespeare Company productions: Marat/Sade and US, released by Premier Recordings. The songs included on this 1992 CD were:

1. Homage to Marat
2. The Corday Waltz
3. Song and Mime of Corday's Arrival in Paris
4. The People's Reaction
5. Those Fat Monkeys
6. Poor Old Marat
7. One Day It Will Come to Pass
8. Poor Marat in Your Bathtub Seat
9. Poor Old Marat (Reprise)
10. Copulation Round
11. Fifteen Glorious Years (interpolating the "Marseillaise")
12. Finale

This track listing omits Royal Anthem (which appears on all other recordings) and does not specifically mention The Tumbrel Song either individually or as a part of Song and Mime of Corday's Arrival in Paris. The cast of this recording includes Patrick Magee, Glenda Jackson and Freddie Jones. (The accompanying production, US, is about an American soldier "zappin' the [Viet] Cong" in the Vietnam War.)

== Productions ==
The play debuted on April 29, 1964, at the Schiller Theater in West Berlin. It was directed by Konrad Swinarski, with incidental music composed by Hans-Martin Majewski.

In 1964, the play was translated by Geoffrey Skelton with lyric adaptation by Adrian Mitchell and staged by the Royal Shakespeare Company. Peter Brook directed a cast that included Ian Richardson as the herald, Clive Revill as Marat, Patrick Magee as de Sade and Glenda Jackson as Charlotte Corday.

After two previews, the Broadway production opened on 27 December 1965 at the Martin Beck Theatre and ran for 145 performances. Richardson took over the role of Marat, while Magee and Jackson reprised the roles they had originated in London.

The play won the Tony Award for Best Play, and Brook was named Best Director. Additional awards went to Magee for Best Performance by a Featured Actor in a Play and Gunilla Palmstierna-Weiss for her Costume Design. Jackson lost the Tony Award for Best Performance by a Featured Actress in a Play to Zoe Caldwell. It also won the 1966 New York Drama Critics' Circle Award for Best Play.

In Australia, the play was directed by Edgar Metcalfe in 1966 at the Playhouse Theatre in Perth. It played for six weeks. The cast included Alan Lander as Marat and Eileen Colocott as Charlotte Corday. Other cast members included Peter Collingwood as the Marquis de Sade, James Beattie, Rosemary Barr, Peter Morris, Chris Johnson, Ken Gregory and Roland Rocchiccioli. The set was designed by Ted Dombowski.

== Other notable productions ==
- The first production, following the opening on Broadway in 1965, was presented in the summer of 1966 at the University of Missouri at Kansas City. It was the first play in a four play season for Missouri Reperatory Theatre. The production was directed by Dr. Patricia McIlrath, and playing the lead, Marat was Joeseph Brockett.
- In 1967, Clayton Garrison's production for Irvine Repertory Theatre featured actors Bob Gunton and Robert Cohen along with Oakley Hall III. Cohen later edited the 1998 publication of the play.
- In October 1969 the Virginia Museum Theater (VMT) opened its season with the play directed by Keith Fowler, the new artistic director of the company. He established the first LORT company in Richmond and led VMTRep (as it became known) to a period of national and international acclaim. Marat/Sade was produced with the first racially integrated cast in VMT's history, and this generated controversy: the two major Richmond newspapers published "rave reviews" of the show, and the editor of the afternoon paper, the News Leader, attacked the production fiercely for evincing "latitudinarianism."
- In 2006 The Blue House Theater Company presented Marat/Sade at the Sacred Fools theater in Los Angeles. The production was directed by Patrick J. Adams with an original score by Joshua Charney. It won an LA Weekly Theater Award for production of the year.
- An all-male production of the play was presented in 2007 at the Classical Theatre of Harlem in New York, under the direction of Christopher McElroen.
- In 2011 the Royal Shakespeare Company staged a revival of the play as part of the company's 50th anniversary celebrations. The revival was directed by Anthony Neilson and ran from 14 October to 11 November.
- American composer Mary McCarty Snow (1928–2012) composed music for a Texas Tech University production of Marat/Sade.
- In 2012, the play was staged at Brava Theatre in San Francisco, produced by Marc Huestis and directed by Russell Blackwood with his company Thrillpeddlers.

== Film adaptation ==
The 1967 film adaptation featured many of the original players from the American production. The long version of the play's title is shown in the film's opening credits, although this was frequently shortened to Marat/Sade in publicity materials. The screenplay was written by Adrian Mitchell and directed by Peter Brook. The cast included Richardson, Magee, Jackson, Jones, and Clifford Rose.

== Awards and nominations ==
=== Original Broadway production ===
Year	Award	Category	Nominee	Result
1966	Tony Award	Best Play		Won
1966	Tony Award	Best Featured Actor in a Play	Patrick Magee	Won
1966	Tony Award	Best Featured Actress in a Play	Glenda Jackson	Nominated
1966	Tony Award	Best Costume Design	Gunilla Palmstierna-Weiss	Won
1966	Tony Award	Best Direction of a Play	Peter Brook	Won

=== 1967 Broadway revival ===
Year	Award	Category	Nominee	Result
1967	Tony Award	Best Featured Actor in a Play	Stephen Elliott	Nominated
1967	Tony Award	Best Direction of a Play	Donald Driver	Nominated

== See also ==
- Madah-Sartre, a play by Alek Baylee Toumi, inspired by Marat/Sade
