= Peter Weiss =

Swedish-German playwright and author (1916–1982)

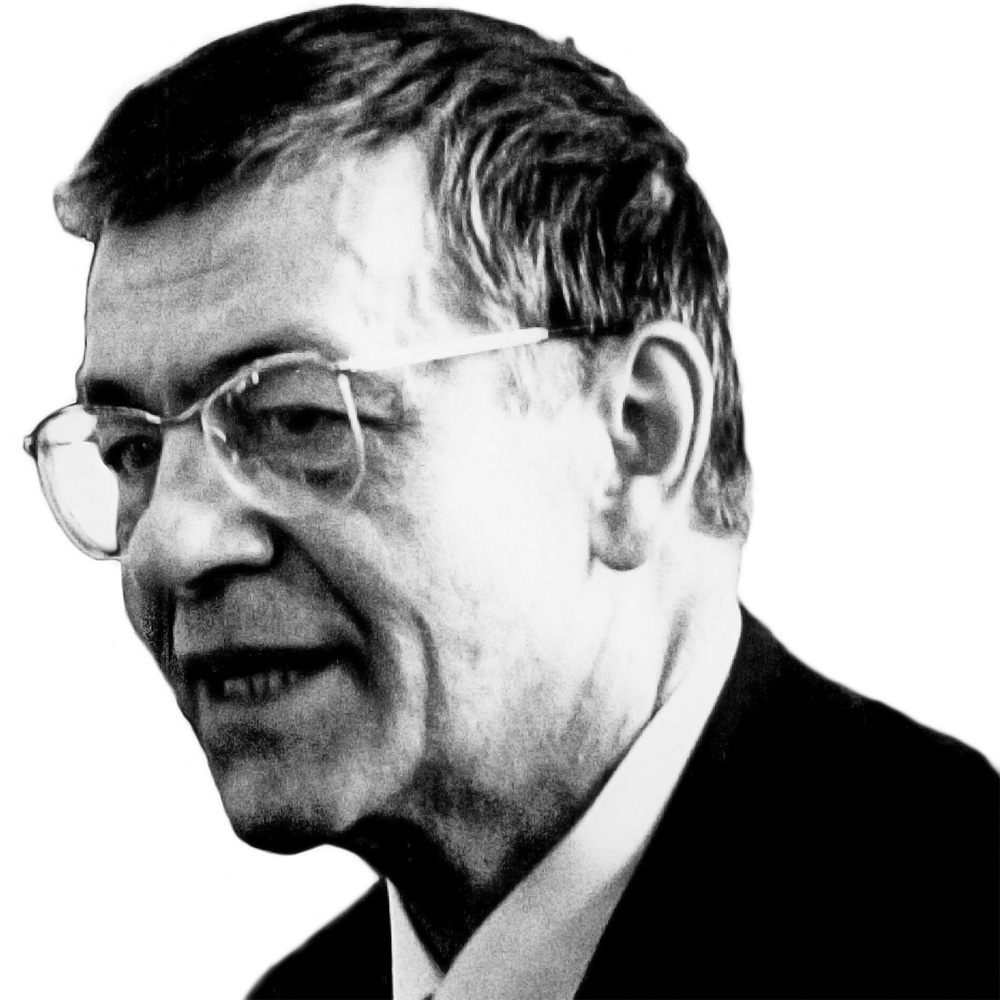
- Weiss speaking at the acceptance ceremony for the Bremen Literature Prize, 1982
- Born: Peter Ulrich Weiss; 8 November 1916; Nowawes, Brandenburg, Germany
- Died: 10 May 1982 (aged 65); Stockholm, Sweden
- Citizenship: Czechoslovakia; Sweden (after 1946)
- Education: Polytechnic School of Photography; Academy of Fine Arts, Prague
- Works: Marat/Sade; The Investigation; The Aesthetics of Resistance
- Movement: Avant-garde
- Spouse: Helga Henschen (m. 1943; div. 1947) Carlota Dethorey (m. 1949, annulled) Gunilla Palmstierna (m. 1964)
- Awards: See below

Peter Ulrich Weiss (8 November 1916 – 10 May 1982) was a German and Swedish writer, painter, graphic artist, and experimental filmmaker. He is particularly known for his plays Marat/Sade and The Investigation and his novel The Aesthetics of Resistance, the latter of which has been called one of the "most important German-language work[s] of the 70s and 80s."

Weiss earned his reputation in the post-war German literary world as the proponent of an avant-garde, meticulously descriptive writing, as an exponent of autobiographical prose, and also as a politically engaged dramatist. He gained international success with Marat/Sade, the American production of which was awarded a Tony Award and its subsequent film adaptation directed by Peter Brook. His "Auschwitz Oratorium" The Investigation, served to broaden the debates over the so-called "Aufarbeitung der Vergangenheit" (or formerly) "Vergangenheitsbewältigung" or "politics of history". Weiss's magnum opus was The Aesthetics of Resistance, .

== Early life ==
Weiss was born in Nowawes (now part of Potsdam-Babelsberg), near Berlin.

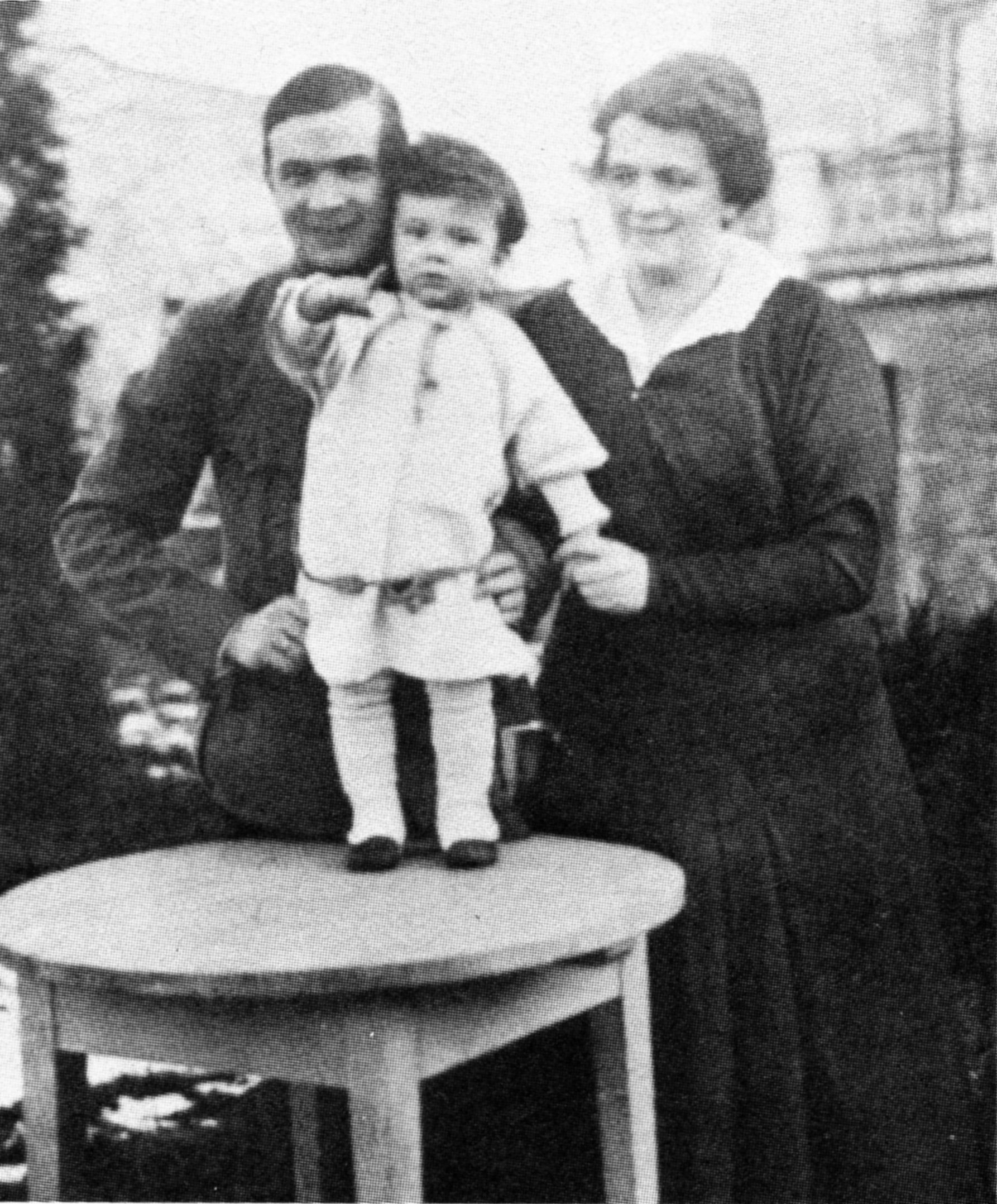
Peter Weiss with his parents, 1918

After the First World War and the break-up of the Austro-Hungarian Empire Weiss's father became a Czech citizen and the son acquired his father's citizenship – Weiss was never a German citizen. Jenö Weisz converted to Protestantism in 1920. Peter Weiss was unaware of his father's Jewish origin until the 1930s.

At the age of three, he moved with his family to the German port city of Bremen, and during his adolescence back to Berlin, where he began training as a painter. In 1935, he emigrated with his family to Chislehurst, near London, England, where he studied photography at the Polytechnic School of Photography.

In 1936–1937 the family moved to Czechoslovakia. Weiss attended the Prague Art Academy. After the German occupation of the Czech Sudetenland in 1938, his family moved to Sweden, while Weiss was visiting Hermann Hesse in Switzerland. In 1939 he joined his family in Stockholm, Sweden, where he lived for the rest of his life. He became a Swedish citizen in 1946.

== Painting, film, and literature ==
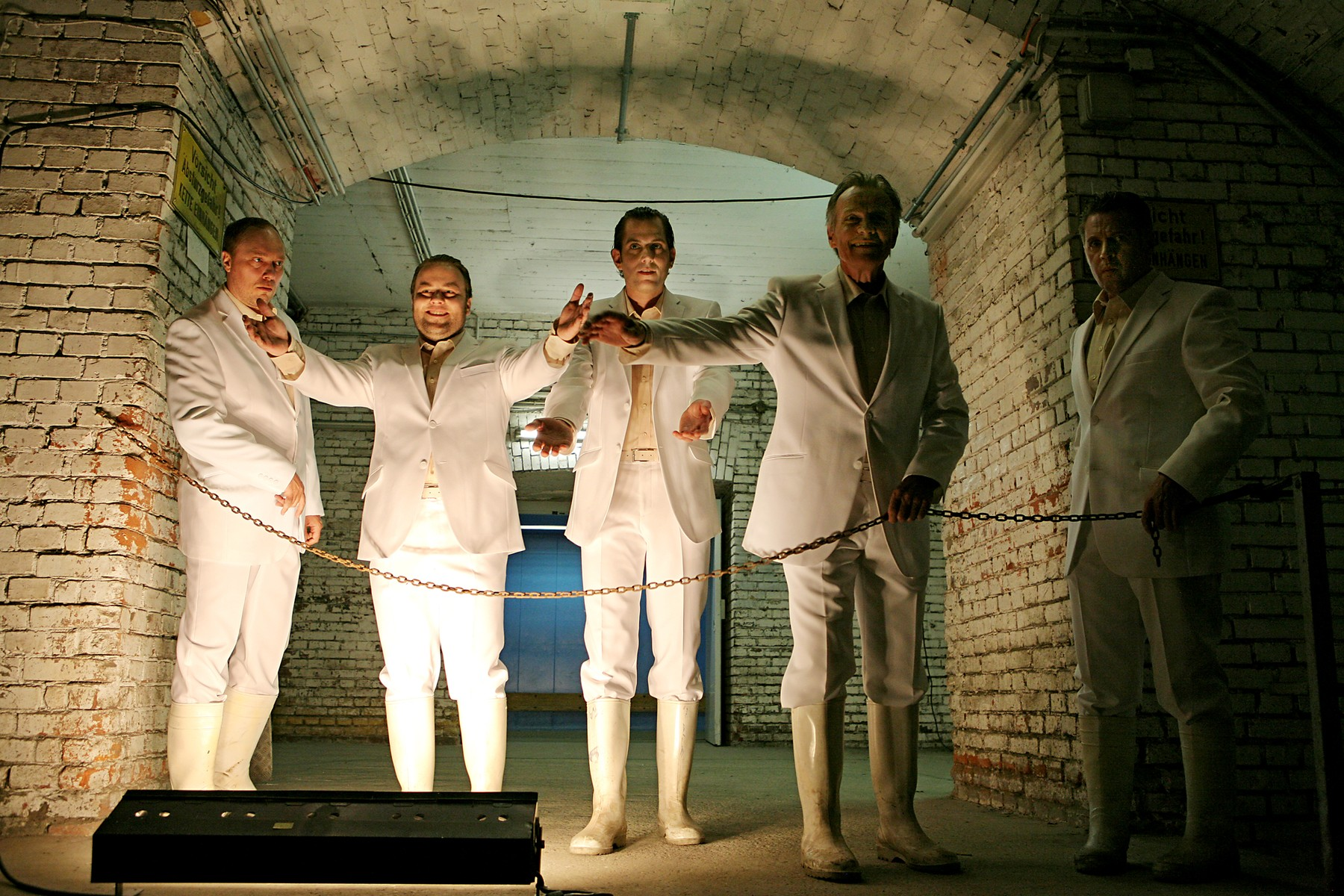
Production of The Investigation at the Staatstheater Nuremberg, 2009 (photography: Marion Buehrle)

During his early life as a painter – 1930 to 1950 – Weiss was influenced by old Dutch masters such as Pieter Breughel, and Hieronymus Bosch. After World War II his painting, as well as his work in film and literature, came under the lasting influence of Surrealism. He taught painting at Stockholm's People's University, and illustrated a Swedish edition of The Book of One Thousand and One Nights. In 1952, he joined the Swedish Experimental Film Studio, where he directed several experimental short films, followed by several socially conscious documentary shorts: Gesichter im Schatten (Faces in the Shadow, 1956), Im Namen des Gesetzes (In the Name of the Law, 1957), Was machen wir jetzt? (What Do We Do Now?, 1958). In 1959, he directed his only full-length (experimental) film Hägringen (The Disappeared). In the early 1950s, Weiss had begun to write again, producing a number of prose works, some in German, others in Swedish. Most are short, intense, surrealist text which suggest the influence of Kafka (whose work Weiss would later adapt for the stage).

The most important of these prose texts is Der Schatten des Körpers des Kutschers (The Shadow of the Body of the Coachman, 1952). It is a nearly hermetic experimental work that explores language through the use of surreal, disturbing imagery whereby an apparent rural idyll is transformed into a kafkaesque nightmare. The Surrealist effect was enhanced by collages in the style of Max Ernst, so-called xylography, which Peter Weiss created for the book. Coachman has been linked both to the French nouveau roman of Alain Robbe-Grillet and Raymond Queneau, as well as to French absurdist works by Samuel Beckett, Eugene Ionesco, and Jean Genet. When it was eventually published in Germany in 1960 it put its 45-year-old writer at the forefront of the West German literary scene. Weiss abandoned painting and filmmaking and turned exclusively to writing. Nearly all his subsequent works – and all of the major ones – are written in German. His next prose work, Abschied von den Eltern (Leavetaking, 1959/60), was less hermetic than Coachman and strongly autobiographical. It was not only a critical but also a public success, as was its follow-up, Fluchtpunkt (Vanishing Point, 1962).

Since the early 1950s, Weiss had also been writing plays: Der Turm (The Tower, 1950), Die Versicherung (The Insurance, 1952), Nacht mit Gästen (Night with Guests, 1963), Wie dem Herrn Mockinpott das Leiden ausgetrieben wird (How Mister Mockinpott was Cured of His Sufferings, 1963/68). But none of these stage works prepared the public for what came next: a play about the French Revolution that through its title alone became an overnight a sensation: "Die Verfolgung und Ermordung Jean Paul Marats dargestellt durch die Schauspielgruppe des Hospizes zu Charenton unter Anleitung des Herrn de Sade (The Persecution and Assassination of Jean Paul Marat As Performed by the Inmates of the Asylum of Charenton Under the Direction of Monsieur de Sade). First performed in West Berlin in 1964, it quickly brought Weiss notoriety. The following year, 1965, British director Peter Brook staged the play at the Royal Shakespeare Theatre in London. Brook's film version (1967) turned Marat/Sade into an international cultural icon. Set in an insane asylum and constantly in danger of being overwhelmed by madness and chaos, the play explores the place of writers and intellectuals in a time of revolutionary upheaval. At its center are two very different historical figures, Jean-Paul Marat, a writer and leading intellectual of the French Revolution, and the Marquis de Sade, a writer and intellectual as well, whose attitude towards the revolution is much more ambivalent and who is solipsistically obsessed with sex, violence, and pain. In the play, Weiss draws both on Antonin Artaud's Theater of Cruelty and on its opposite: Brecht's theater of reason. In the words of de Sade: "Our intent in creating such dialogues as these / was to experiment with various antitheses / to oppose each to each so that we might / upon our many doubts shed some light". Much of the discussion of the play has focused on whether it is Marat's or Sade's position which prevails.

Beginning with Marat/Sade, Weiss's work increasingly attracted the attention of communist East Germany. The play and all the ones to follow were staged in exemplary fashion in Rostock and other theaters in the GDR. Weiss frequently visited East Berlin and became friends with many East German writers and artists. He developed a collaborative relationship and eventually a close friendship with Manfred Haiduk, professor of literature in Rostock. After Weiss wrote his play about Trotsky, which East German party functionaries interpreted as an anti-Leninist provocation, he for a while became persona non grata, but the relationship soon revived. Weiss was one of only a handful of western artists and intellectuals whose work attracted wide interest in both Germanies though in both states he was also subjected to distrust and denunciations.

During this period Brecht's influence on Weiss's plays became more evident. He also became obsessed with Dante's Divine Comedy the influence of which is present in all his works from the mid-1960s until his death. In 1965, Weiss wrote the documentary play The Investigation (Die Ermittlung), on the Frankfurt Auschwitz Trials. Like Marat/Sade it attracted wide international attention and became the focus of heated debates about the 'right' way of representing Auschwitz and about who gets to decide what is acceptable and what is not. This was followed by two experimental plays about the struggle for self-determination in the 'Third World': Gesang vom lusitanischen Popanz (Song of the Lusitanian Bogey [a better translation would be Canto of the Lusitanian Bogey] 1967) about Angola, and Viet Nam Diskurs (Viet Nam Discourse, 1968). The next two plays once again focused on intellectuals and writers in times of upheaval: Trotzki im Exil (Trotsky in Exile, 1970) and Hölderlin (1971).

Between 1971 and 1981 Weiss worked on his magnum opus: his monumental (1000 page) three-part novel on the European resistance against Nazi Germany, The Aesthetics of Resistance. During the decade, he also wrote two very different stage versions of Kafka's novel The Trial.

== Political activities ==
In the 1960s, Weiss became increasingly politically radical, taking stands for revolutionary Cuba and against US intervention in Vietnam and visiting both countries. In 1966, he visited the United States together with the West German writers group Gruppe 47. During a conference at Princeton University, he denounced the US war against North Vietnam which seems to have scandalised his German colleagues more than his US hosts. In 1967, he participated in the anti-war Russell Tribunal in Stockholm and in 1968 he joined the eurocommunist Swedish Left Party (VPK). During the same year, he also visited North Vietnam and published a book about his trip.

== Accolades ==
Weiss received numerous awards, among them the Charles Veillon Award, 1963; the Lessing Prize, 1965; the Heinrich Mann Prize, 1966; the Carl Albert Anderson Prize, 1967; the Thomas Dehler Prize, 1978; the Cologne Literature Prize, 1981; the Bremen Literature Prize, 1982; the Swedish Theatre Critics Prize, 1982; and finally the highest German literary award, the Georg Büchner Prize, 1982.

== Personal life ==
Weiss was married three times: to the painter Helga Henschen, 1943–47; to Carlota Dethorey, 1949; and from 1964 until his death to the Swedish artist and stage designer Gunilla Palmstierna-Weiss.

In 1970, he suffered a heart attack.

=== Death ===
Weiss died in Stockholm in 1982, at the age of 65.

== Selected list of works ==
All works were originally written in German unless otherwise noted. English translations and, where applicable, place of publication, publisher and date of English language publication, are in parentheses.

=== Plays ===
- 1949: Der Turm (The Tower. New York: Dutton, 1967, pp. 315–48)
- 1952: Die Versicherung
- 1963: Nacht mit Gästen (Night with Guests. In: The Best Short Plays 1968. Philadelphia New York London: Chilton, 1968. 131–58.)
- 1963/5: Die Verfolgung und Ermordung Jean Paul Marats dargestellt durch die Schauspielgruppe des Hospizes zu Charenton unter Anleitung des Herrn de Sade (The Persecution and Assassination of Jean-Paul Marat As Performed by the Inmates of the Asylum of Charenton Under the Direction of Monsieur de Sade [Marat/Sade]). In: Peter Weiss: Marat/Sade, The Investigation, and The Shadow of the Body of the Coachman. New York: Continuum, 1998. 41–114.)
- 1963/8: Wie dem Herrn Mockinpott das Leiden ausgetrieben wird (How Mr. Mockinpott was Cured of his Sufferings. In: The Contemporary German Theater. New York: Avon, 1972, 163–211.)
- 1965: Die Ermittlung (The Investigation. Oratorio In 11 Cantos. In: Peter Weiss: Marat/Sade, The Investigation, and The Shadow of the Body of the Coachman. New York: Continuum, 1998. 117–296.)
- 1967: Gesang vom lusitanischen Popanz (Song of the Lusitanian Bogey. In: Peter Weiss. Two Plays. New York: Atheneum, 1970. 1–63)
- 1968: Diskurs über die Vorgeschichte und den Verlauf des lang andauernden Befreiungskrieges in Viet Nam als Beispiel für die Notwendigkeit des bewaffneten Kampfes der Unterdrückten gegen ihre Unterdrücker sowie über die Versuche der Vereinigten Staaten von Amerika die Grundlagen der Revolution zu vernichten (Discourse on the Progress of the Prolonged War of Liberation in Viet Nam and the Events Leading up to it as Illustration of the Necessity for Armed Resistance against Oppression and on the Attempts of the United States of America to Destroy the Foundations of Revolution [Viet Nam Discourse]. In: Peter Weiss. Two Plays. New York: Atheneum, 1970. 65–249.)
- 1969: Trotzki im Exil (Trotsky in Exile. New York: Atheneum, 1972.)
- 1971: Hölderlin (Hölderlin. London New York Calcutta: Seagull Press. 2010.)
- 1974: Der Prozeß – adaptation of Franz Kafka's novel
- 1982: Der neue Prozeß (The New Trial. Durham: Duke UP, 2001.)

=== Prose fiction ===
- 1944: Från ö till ö (From Island to Island; written in Swedish; German: Von Insel zu Insel)
- 1948: De besegrade (The Conquered; written in Swedish; German: Die Besiegten)
- 1948: Der Vogelfreie (published as Dokument I in Swedish (1949) and in German as Der Fremde under the pseudonym Sinclair)
- 1951: Duellen (The Duel; written in Swedish; German: Das Duell)
- 1952: Der Schatten des Körpers des Kutschers (The Shadow of the Body of the Coachman. In: Peter Weiss: Marat/Sade, The Investigation, and The Shadow of the Body of the Coachman. New York: Continuum, 1998. 1–39.)
- 1956: Situationen (The Situation; written in Swedish; German: Die Situation)
- 1960: Abschied von den Eltern (Leavetaking. In: Peter Weiss, Exile. New York: Delacorte, 1968, 1–88)
- 1961: Fluchtpunkt (Vanishing Point. In: Weiss, Exile. New York: Delacorte, 1968. 89–245.)

These two pieces (Leavetaking & Vanishing Point) were published in English (from a translation by Christopher Levenson) in 1966 and published by Calder & Boyars

- 1962: Das Gespräch der drei Gehenden (Conversation of the Three Wayfarers. In: Peter Weiss, Bodies and Shadows, New York: Delacorte, 1969. 59–120.)
- 1975–1981: Die Ästhetik des Widerstands, 3 vols., I: 1975; II: 1978; III: 1981. (The Aesthetics of Resistance. Vol. I. Durham: Duke UP, 2005. Vol. II. Durham: Duke UP, 2020)

=== Other writings ===
- 1956: Avantgarde Film (written in Swedish)
- 1964: "Meine Ortschaft" ("My Place." In: German Writing Today. Harmondsworth: Penguin, 1967. 20–28.)
- 1965: "10 Arbeitspunkte eines Autors in der geteilten Welt." ("The Necessary Decision. 10 Working Theses of an Author in the Divided World." Chalk Circle, vol. 1, 1 (April–May)/1966, 3–7.
- 1966: "I Come out of my hiding place." The Nation, 30 May 1966, pp. 652, 655. (Written in English by Peter Weiss.)
- 1968: Rapporte (Collected essays)
- 1968: Notizen zum kulturellen Leben der Demokratischen Republik Viet Nam. (Notes on the Cultural Life of the Democratic Republic of Vietnam. London: Calder & Boyars, 1971.)
- 1968: "Notizen zum dokumentarischen Theater" ("Notes on the Contemporary Theater." In: Essays on German Theater. New York: Continuum, 1985. 294–301.)
- 1969: 'Limited Bombing' in Vietnam (Report on the attacks against the Democratic Republic of Vietnam by the US Air Force, after the declaration of 'limited bombing' by President Lyndon B. Johnson on March 31 1968. With Gunilla Palmstierna-Weiss. Bertrand Russell Peace Foundation.)
- 1970: Rekonvaleszenz
- 1971: Rapporte 2 (Collected essays)
- 1981: Notizbücher 1971–1980 (Notebooks 1971–1980, 2 vols.)
- 1982: Notizbücher 1960–1971 (Notebooks 1960–1972, 2 vols.)

=== Films ===
- 1952: Studie I (Uppvaknandet) (Sweden, 16mm, 6min)
- 1952: Studie II (Hallucinationer) / Study II (Hallucinations) (Sweden, 16mm, 6min)
- 1953: Studie III / Study III (Sweden, 16mm, 6min)
- 1954: Studie IV (Frigörelse) / Study IV (Liberation) (Sweden, 16mm, 9min)
- 1955: Studie V (Växelspel)/Study V (Interplay) (Sweden, 16mm, 9min)
- 1956: Ateljeinteriör / Dr. Fausts Studierstube(Atelierinterieur) (Sweden, 10 min)
- 1956: Ansikten I Skugga / Faces in the shadow (Sweden, 13 min)
- 1957: Enligt Lag / According To Law (co-director. Hans Nordenström, Sweden, 16mm, 18 min)
- 1958: Vad ska vi göra nu da? / Was machen wir jetzt? (Sweden, 20min)
- 1959: Hägringen / Fata Morgana (Sweden, 81min) Starring: Staffan Lamm and Gunilla Palmstierna.
- 1961: Svenska flickor i Paris / Swedish Girls in Paris (co-director)

=== Published correspondence ===
- 1992: Peter Weiss. Briefe an Hermann Levin Goldschmidt|Hermann Lewin Goldschmidt und Robert Jungk 1938–1980. Leipzig: Reclam.
- 2007: Siegfried Unseld, Peter Weiss: Der Briefwechsel. Hrsg. von Rainer Gerlach. Frankfurt am Main: Suhrkamp.
- 2009: Hermann Hesse, Peter Weiss. "Verehrter großer Zauberer" – Briefwechsel 1937–1962. Hrsg. von Beat Mazenauer und Volker Michels. Frankfurt am Main: Suhrkamp.
- 2010: Diesseits und jenseits der Grenze. Peter Weiss – Manfred Haiduk. Der Briefwechsel 1965–1982. Hrsg. von Rainer Gerlach und Jürgen Schutte. St. Ingbert: Röhrig.
- 2011: Peter Weiss – Briefe an Henriette Itta Blumenthal. Hrsg. von Angela Abmeier und Hannes Bajohr. Berlin: Matthes und Seitz.

=== Interviews ===
- Alvarez, A., "The Truths That are Uttered in a Madhouse." The New York Times, 26 December 1965, Section X, p. 3, 14.
- Clausen, Oliver, "Weiss/Propagandist and Weiss/Playwright." The New York Times Magazine, 2 October 1966, pp. 28–29, 124–34.
- Gray, Paul, "A Living World: An Interview with Peter Weiss". Tulane Drama Review 11.1 (1966).
- Roloff, Michael, "An Interview with Peter Weiss". Partisan Review 32/1965, 220–32.
- Shepard, Richard F., "Peter Weiss, Visiting Here, Talks About his Auschwitz Trial Play". The New York Times, 22 April 1966, S. 30.
- Wager, Walter, "Peter Weiss", in: Wager (ed.), The Playwrights Speak, New York: Delacorte 1967, 189–212.
