= 27th Saturn Awards =

US film and television award ceremony

- Date: June 12, 2001
- Site: Century City, Los Angeles, California, U.S.

Highlights
- Most awards: X-Men (6)
- Most nominations: X-Men (10)

The 27th Saturn Awards, honoring the best in science fiction, fantasy and horror film and television in 2000, were held on June 12, 2001 at the Park Hyatt Hotel in Century City, Los Angeles. The nominees were announced on April 4, 2001.

Below is a complete list of nominees and winners. Winners are highlighted in bold.

== Winners and nominees ==
=== Film ===
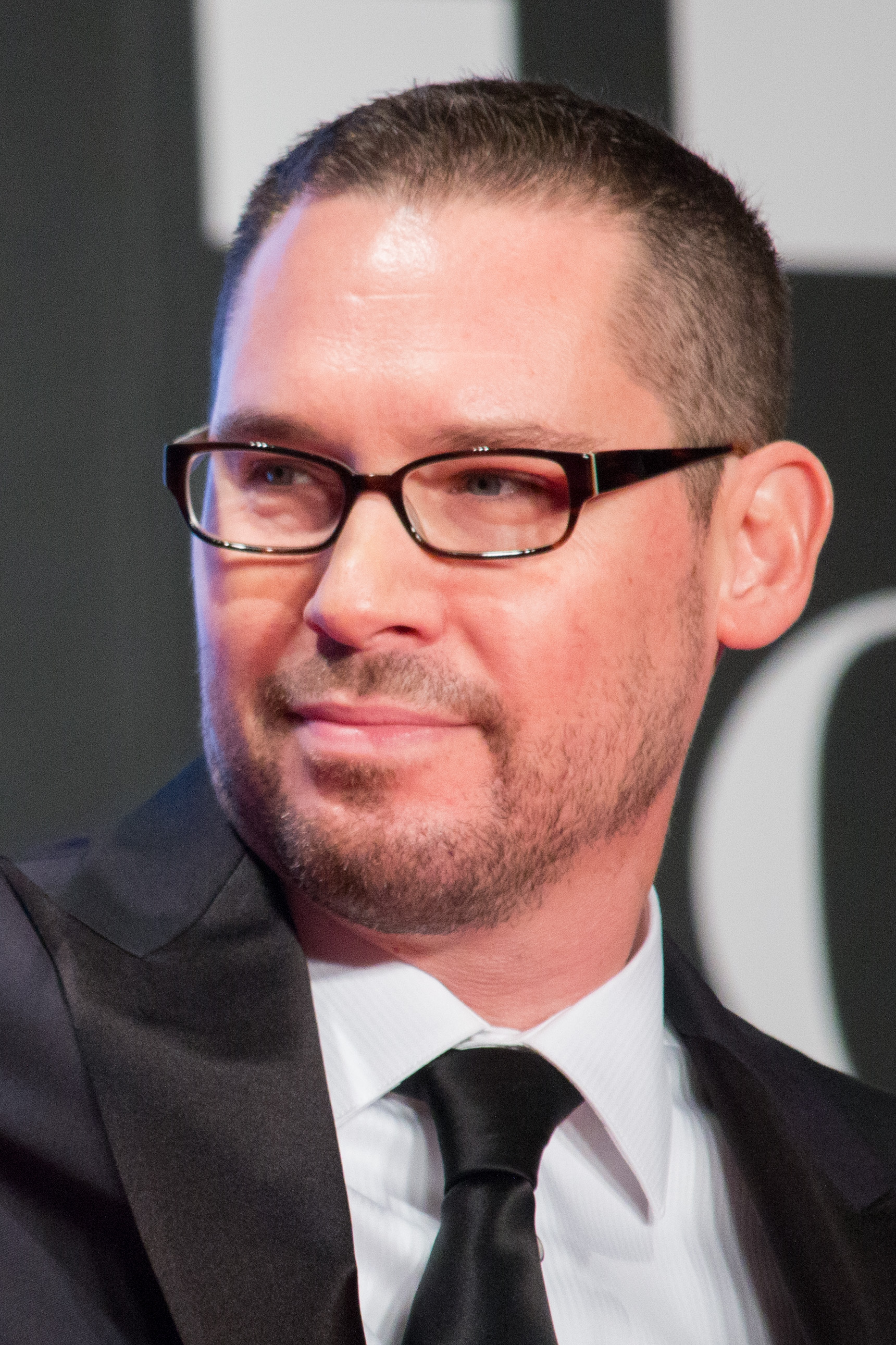
Bryan Singer, Best Director winner

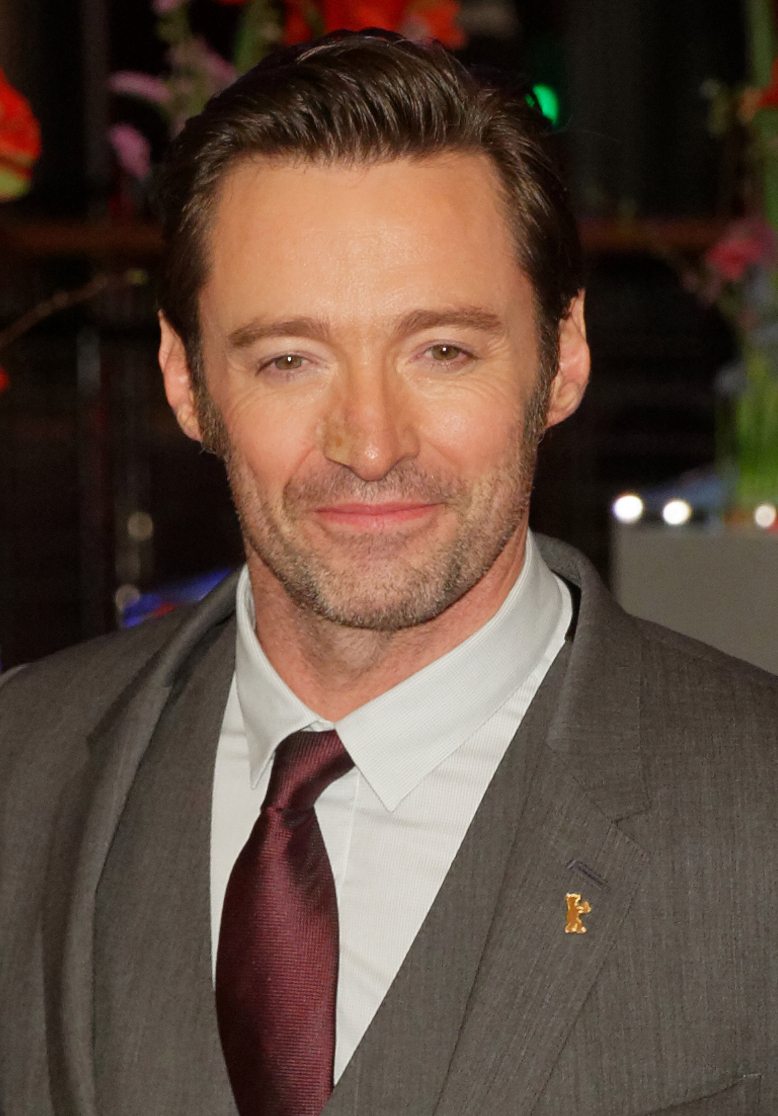
Hugh Jackman, Best Actor winner

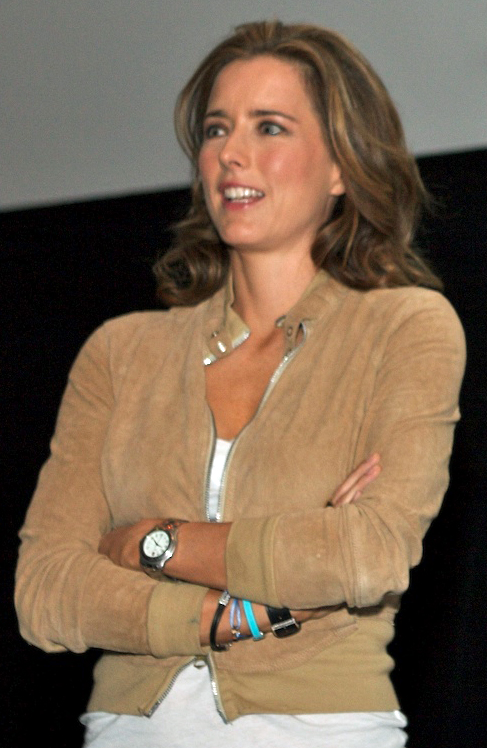
Téa Leoni, Best Actress winner

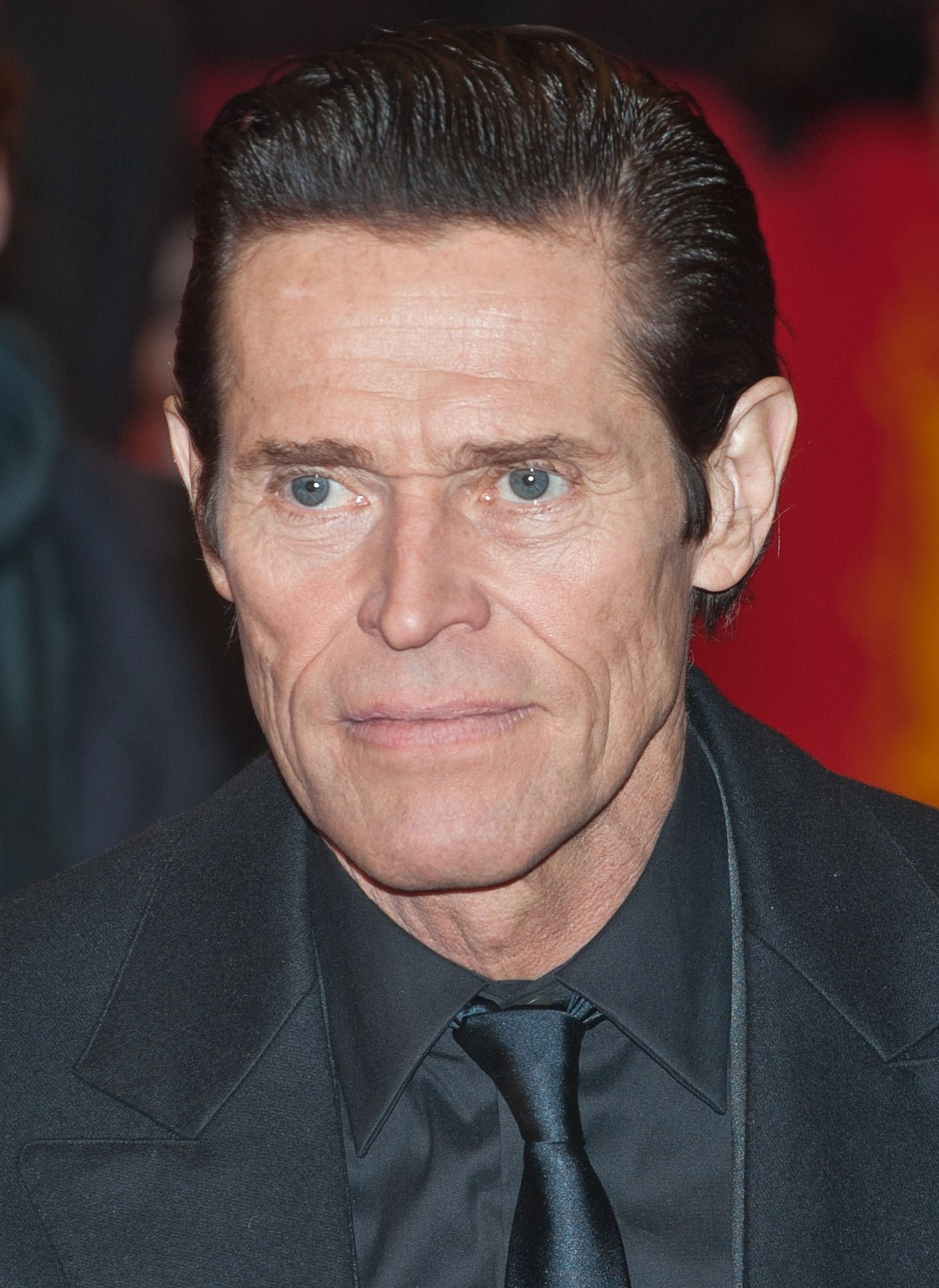
Willem Dafoe, Best Supporting Actor winner

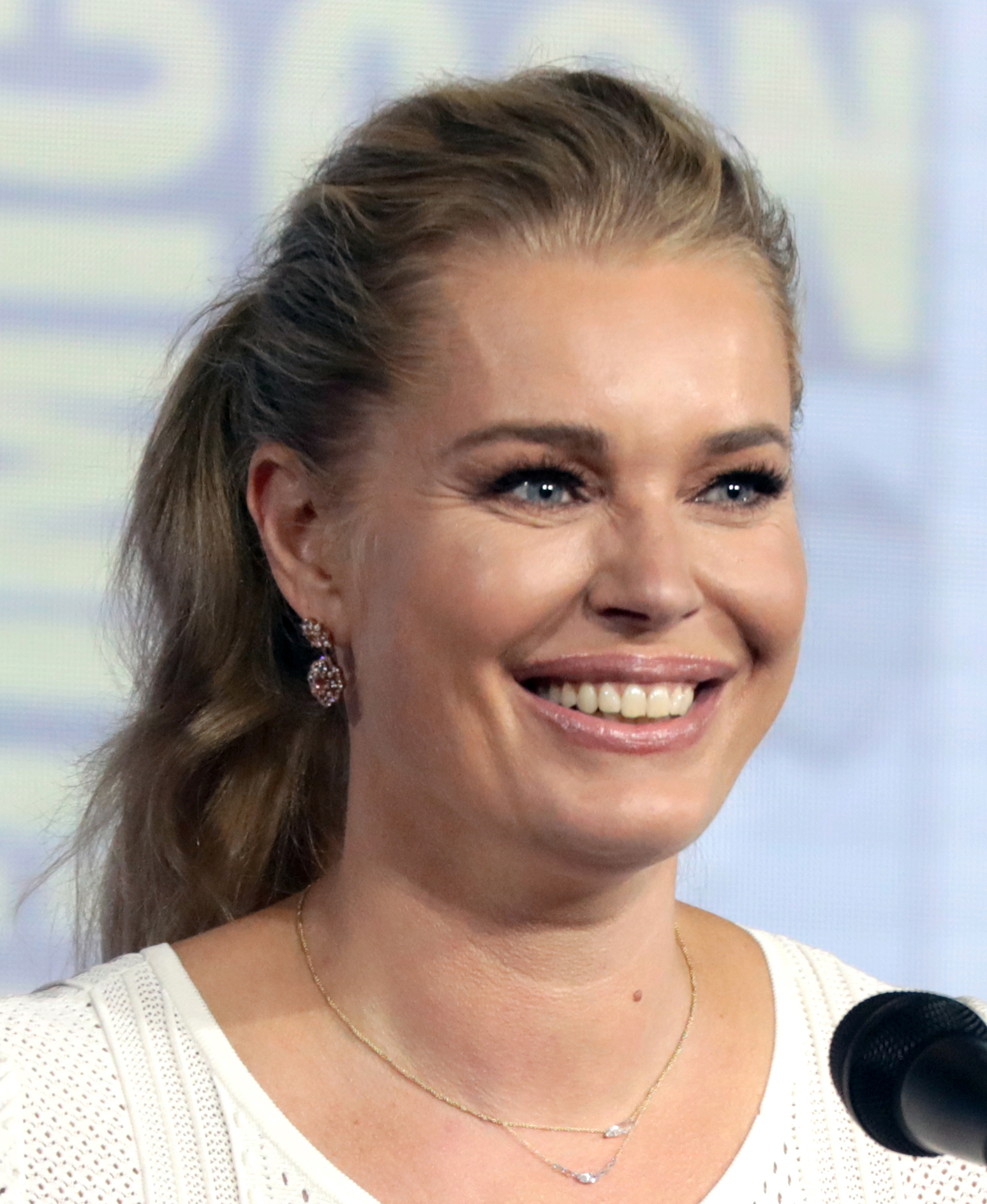
Rebecca Romijn-Stamos, Best Supporting Actress winner

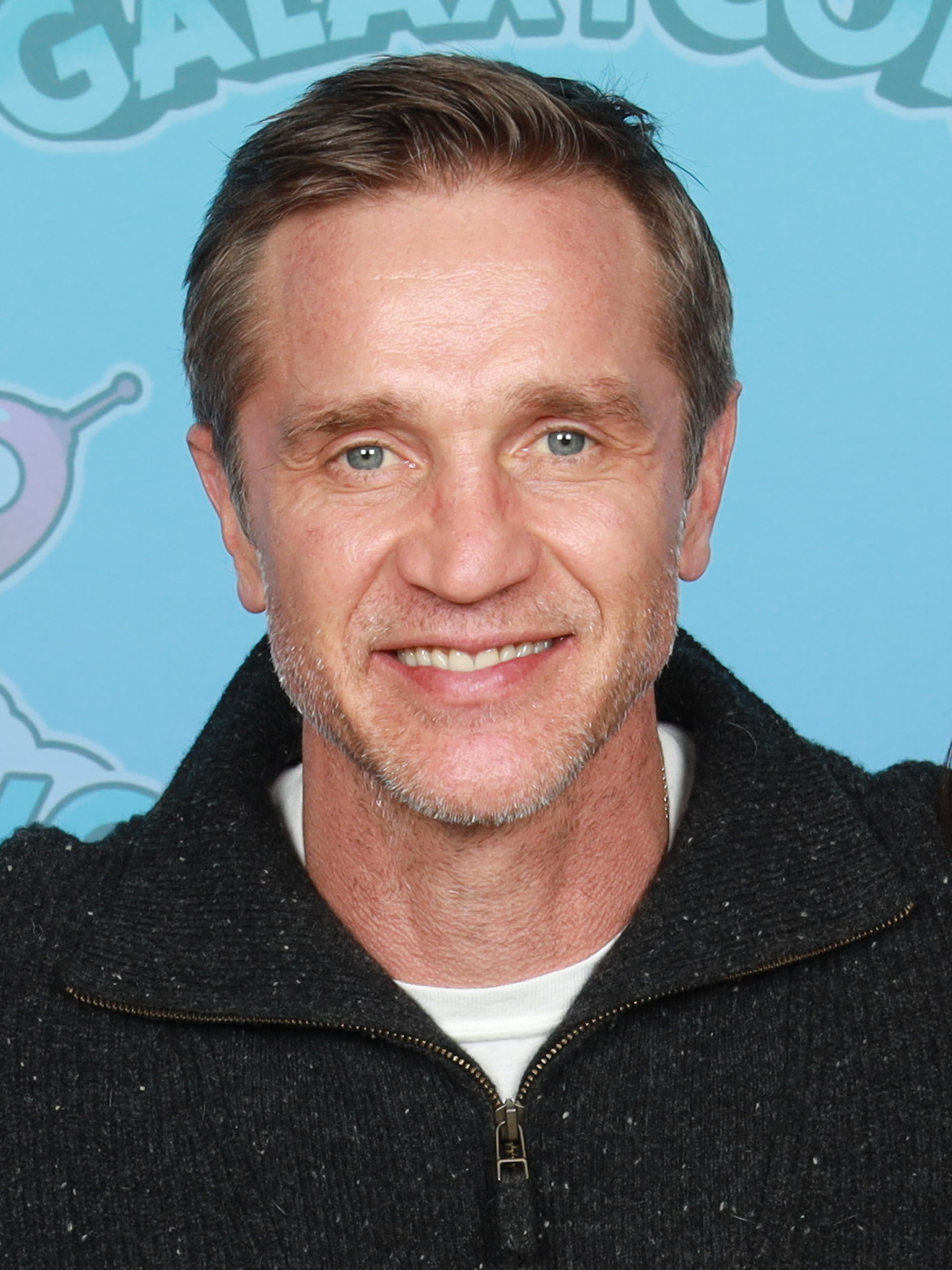
Devon Sawa, Best Performance by a Younger Actor winner

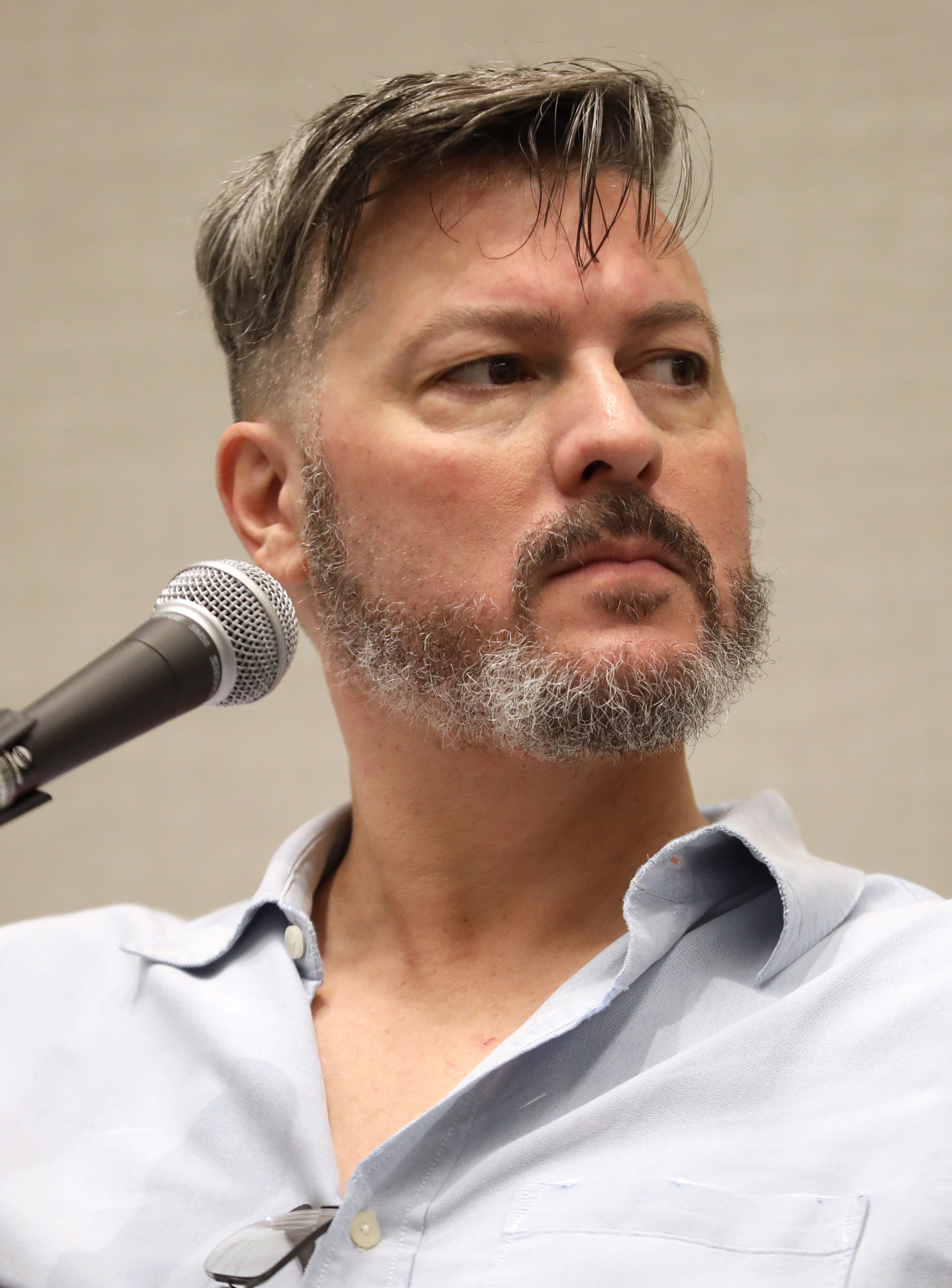
David Hayter, Best Writing winner

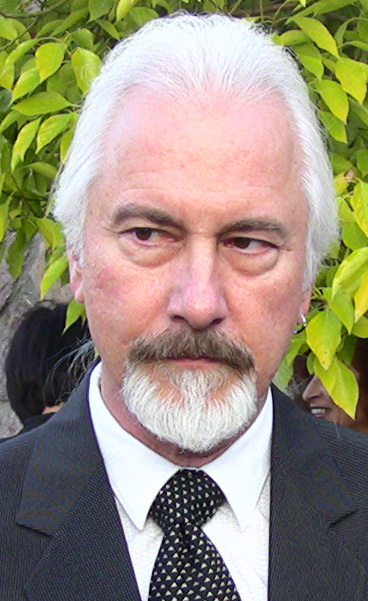
Rick Baker, Best Make-up co-winner

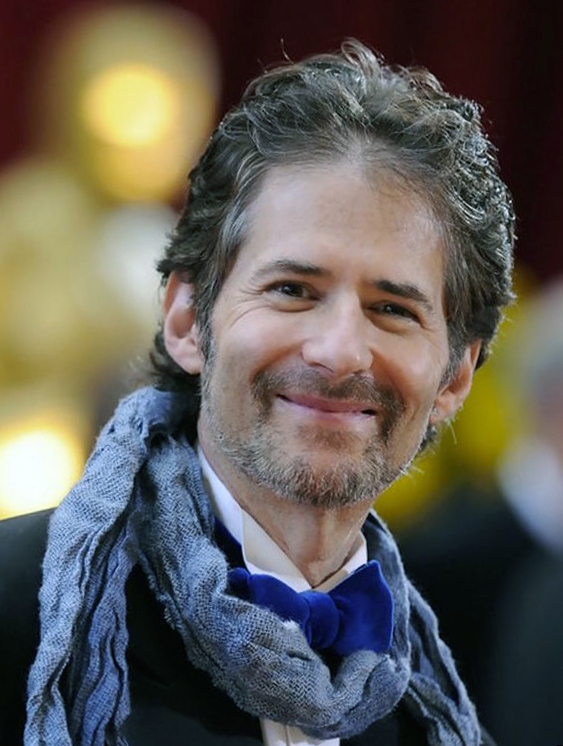
James Horner, Best Music winner

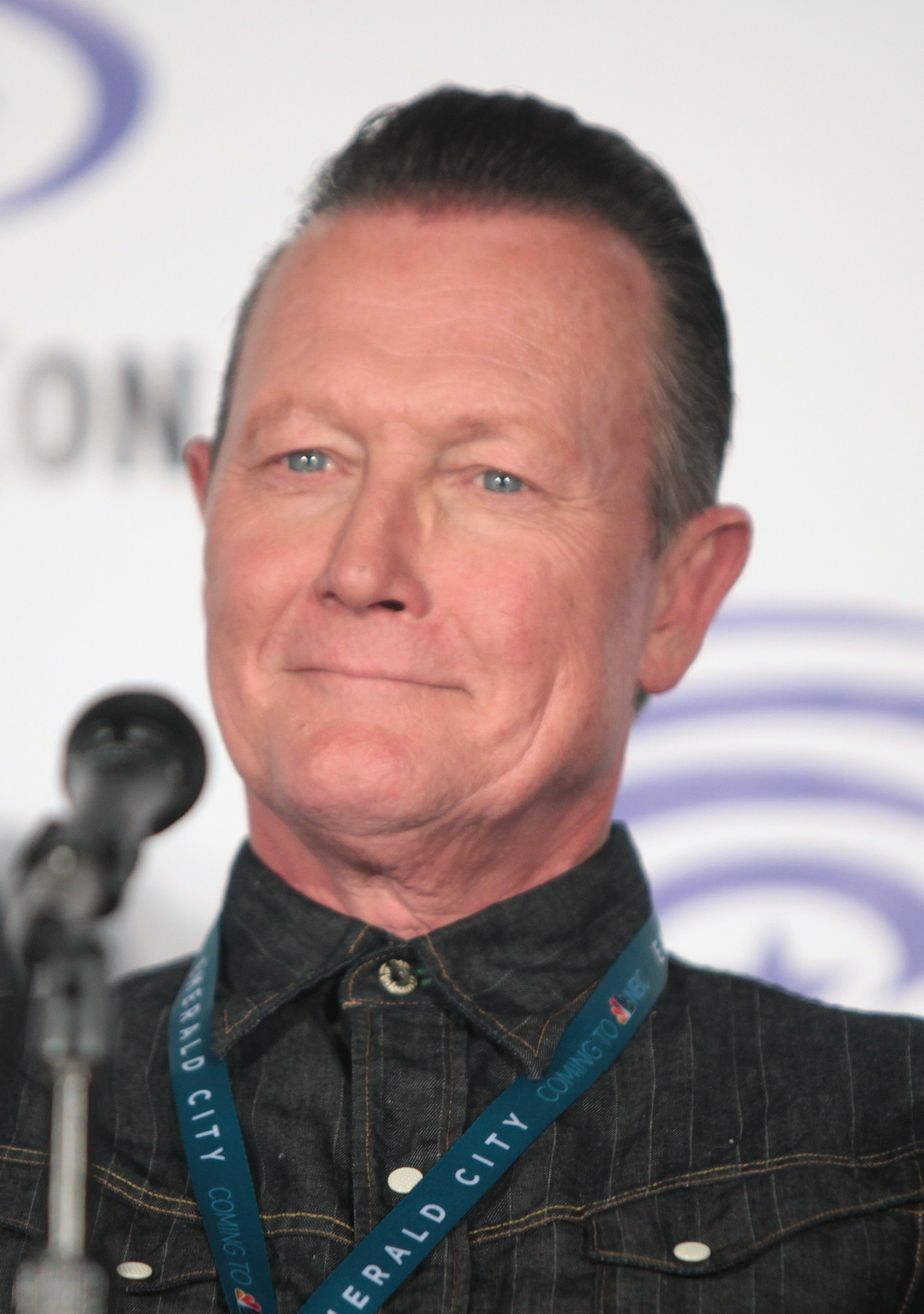
Robert Patrick, Best Television Actor winner

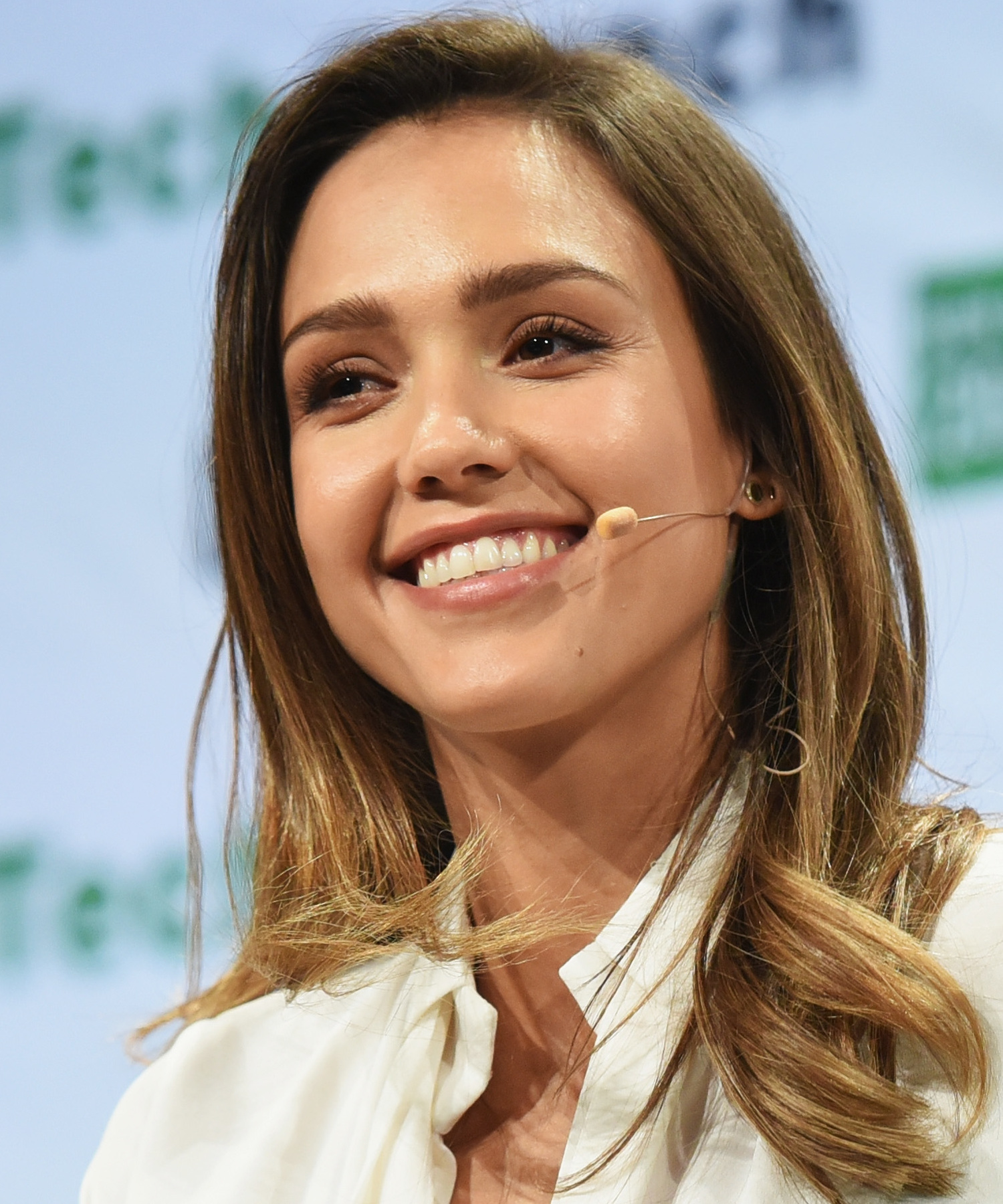
Jessica Alba, Best Television Actress winner

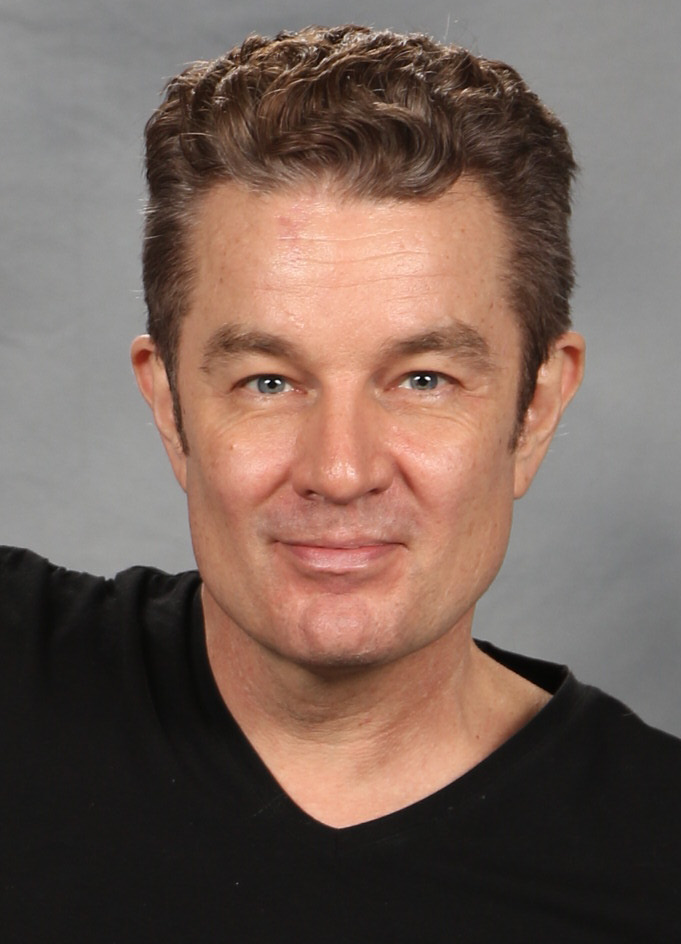
James Marsters, Best Supporting Television Actor winner

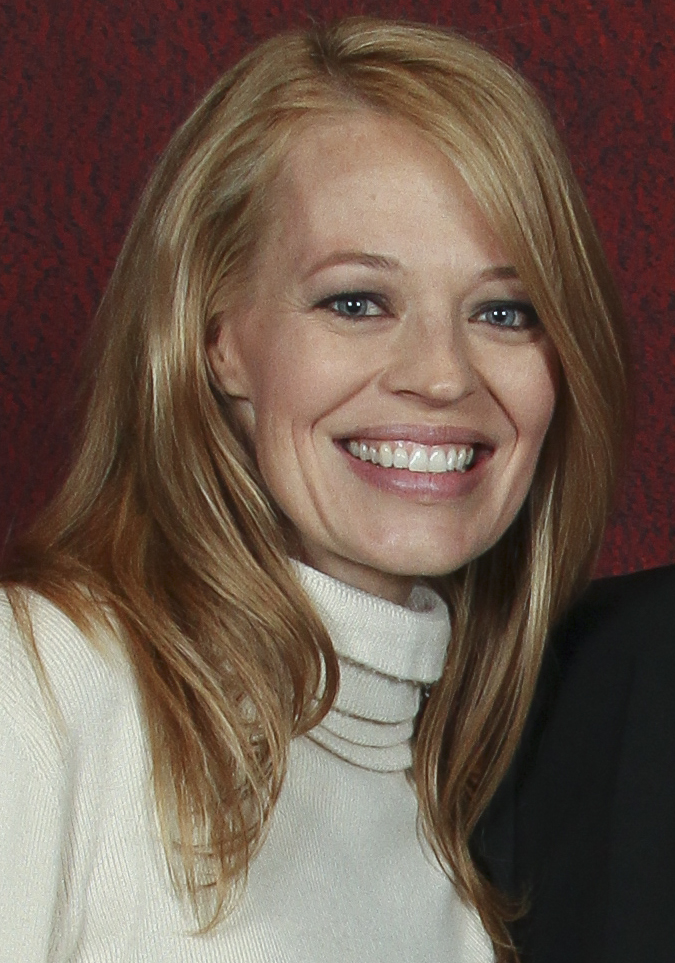
Jeri Ryan, Best Supporting Television Actress winner

Best Science Fiction Film	Best Fantasy Film
**X-Men**; The 6th Day; The Cell; Hollow Man; Space Cowboys; Titan A.E.	**Frequency**; Chicken Run; Dinosaur; The Family Man; How the Grinch Stole Christmas; What Women Want
Best Horror Film	Best Action/Adventure/Thriller Film
**Final Destination**; Dracula 2000; The Gift; Requiem for a Dream; Urban Legends: Final Cut; What Lies Beneath	**Crouching Tiger, Hidden Dragon**; Charlie's Angels; Gladiator; The Patriot; The Perfect Storm; Traffic; Unbreakable
Best Actor	Best Actress
**Hugh Jackman – X-Men as Logan / Wolverine**; Jim Carrey – How the Grinch Stole Christmas as The Grinch; Russell Crowe – Gladiator as Maximus Decimus Meridius; Clint Eastwood – Space Cowboys as Colonel Frank Corvin; Arnold Schwarzenegger – The 6th Day as Adam Gibson / Adam Gibson Clone; Chow Yun-fat – Crouching Tiger, Hidden Dragon as Master Li Mu Bai (Lǐ Mùbái)	**Téa Leoni – The Family Man as Kate Reynolds / Kate Campbell**; Cate Blanchett – The Gift as Annabelle "Annie" Wilson; Ellen Burstyn – Requiem for a Dream as Sara Goldfarb; Jennifer Lopez – The Cell as Dr. Catherine Deane; Michelle Pfeiffer – What Lies Beneath as Claire Spencer; Michelle Yeoh – Crouching Tiger, Hidden Dragon as Yu Shu Lien (Yú Xiùlián)
Best Supporting Actor	Best Supporting Actress
**Willem Dafoe – Shadow of the Vampire as Max Schreck**; Jason Alexander – The Adventures of Rocky and Bullwinkle as Boris Badenov; Dennis Quaid – Frequency as Frank Sullivan; Giovanni Ribisi – The Gift as Buddy Cole; Will Smith – The Legend of Bagger Vance as Bagger Vance; Patrick Stewart – X-Men as Professor Charles Xavier / Professor X	**Rebecca Romijn-Stamos – X-Men as Mystique**; Cameron Diaz – Charlie's Angels as Natalie Cook; Lucy Liu – Charlie's Angels as Alex Munday; Rene Russo – The Adventures of Rocky and Bullwinkle as Natasha Fatale; Hilary Swank – The Gift as Valerie Barksdale; Zhang Ziyi – Crouching Tiger, Hidden Dragon as Jen Yu (Yù Jiāolóng)
Best Performance by a Younger Actor	Best Director
**Devon Sawa – Final Destination as Alex Browning**; Spencer Breslin – The Kid as Young Rusty Duritz; Holliston Coleman – Bless the Child as Cody O'Connor; Jonathan Lipnicki – The Little Vampire as Tony Thompson; Taylor Momsen – How the Grinch Stole Christmas as Cindy Lou Who; Anna Paquin – X-Men as Rogue	**Bryan Singer – X-Men**; Clint Eastwood – Space Cowboys; Ron Howard – How the Grinch Stole Christmas; Ang Lee – Crouching Tiger, Hidden Dragon; Ridley Scott – Gladiator; Robert Zemeckis – What Lies Beneath
Best Writing	Best Costumes
**David Hayter – X-Men**; Toby Emmerich – Frequency; David Franzoni, John Logan, and William Nicholson – Gladiator; Wang Hui-ling, James Schamus, and Kuo Jung Tsai – Crouching Tiger, Hidden Dragon; Karey Kirkpatrick – Chicken Run; Billy Bob Thornton and Tom Epperson – The Gift	**Louise Mingenbach – X-Men**; Caroline de Vivaise – Shadow of the Vampire; Eiko Ishioka and April Napier – The Cell; Rita Ryack and David Page – How the Grinch Stole Christmas; Janty Yates – Gladiator; Timmy Yip – Crouching Tiger, Hidden Dragon
Best Make-up	Best Music
**Rick Baker and Gail Rowell-Ryan – How the Grinch Stole Christmas**; Rick Baker and Nena Smarz – Nutty Professor II: The Klumps; Ann Buchanan and Amber Sibley – Shadow of the Vampire; Michèle Burke and Edouard F. Henriques – The Cell; Alec Gillis, Tom Woodruff Jr., Jeff Dawn, and Charles Porlier – The 6th Day; Gordon J. Smith and Ann Brodie – X-Men	**James Horner – How the Grinch Stole Christmas**; Tan Dun and Yo-Yo Ma – Crouching Tiger, Hidden Dragon; Jerry Goldsmith – Hollow Man; James Newton Howard – Dinosaur; Hans Zimmer and Lisa Gerrard – Gladiator; Hans Zimmer and John Powell – The Road to El Dorado
Best Special Effects	Best Home Video Release
**Scott E. Anderson, Craig Hayes, Scott Stokdyk, and Stan Parks – Hollow Man**; Stefen Fangmeier, Habib Zargarpour, Tim Alexander, and John Frazier – The Perfect Storm; Michael L. Fink, Michael J. McAlister, David Prescott, and Theresa Ellis Rygiel – X-Men; Michael Lantieri and David Drzewiecki – The 6th Day; Kevin Scott Mack, Matthew E. Butler, Bryan Grill, and Allen Hall – How the Grinch Stole Christmas	**Princess Mononoke**; Ghost Dog: The Way of the Samurai; Godzilla 2000; The Ninth Gate; The Prophecy 3: The Ascent; Scream 3

=== Television ===
==== Programs ====
Best Network Television Series	Best Syndicated Cable Television Series
**Buffy the Vampire Slayer (The WB)**; Angel (The WB); Dark Angel (Fox); Roswell (The WB); Star Trek: Voyager (UPN); The X-Files (Fox)	**Farscape (Sci Fi)**; Andromeda (Syndicated); Beastmaster (Syndicated); The Invisible Man (Sci Fi); The Outer Limits (Showtime); Stargate SG-1 (Showtime)
Best Single Television Presentation
**Fail Safe (CBS)**; Frank Herbert's Dune (Sci Fi); Jason and the Argonauts (NBC); Santa Who? (ABC); Sole Survivor (Fox); Witchblade (TNT)

==== Acting ====
Best Actor on Television	Best Actress on Television
**Robert Patrick – The X-Files (Fox) as John Doggett**; Richard Dean Anderson – Stargate SG-1 (Showtime) as Jack O'Neill; Jason Behr – Roswell (The WB) as Max Evans; David Boreanaz – Angel (The WB) as Angel; Ben Browder – Farscape (Sci Fi) as John Crichton; Kevin Sorbo – Andromeda (Syndicated) as Dylan Hunt	**Jessica Alba – Dark Angel (Fox) as Max Guevara**; Gillian Anderson – The X-Files (Fox) as Dana Scully; Claudia Black – Farscape (Sci Fi) as Aeryn Sun; Charisma Carpenter – Angel (The WB) as Cordelia Chase; Sarah Michelle Gellar – Buffy the Vampire Slayer (The WB) as Buffy Summers; Kate Mulgrew – Star Trek: Voyager (UPN) as Kathryn Janeway
Best Supporting Actor on Television	Best Supporting Actress on Television
**James Marsters – Buffy the Vampire Slayer (The WB) as Spike**; Alexis Denisof – Angel (The WB) as Wesley Wyndam-Pryce; Brendan Fehr – Roswell (The WB) as Michael Guerin; Anthony Head – Buffy the Vampire Slayer (The WB) as Rupert Giles; Michael Shanks – Stargate SG-1 (Showtime) as Daniel Jackson; Michael Weatherly – Dark Angel (Fox) as Logan Cale	**Jeri Ryan – Star Trek: Voyager (UPN) as Seven of Nine**; Alyson Hannigan – Buffy the Vampire Slayer (The WB) as Willow Rosenberg; Katherine Heigl – Roswell (The WB) as Isabel Evans; Juliet Landau – Angel (The WB) as Drusilla; Amanda Tapping – Stargate SG-1 (Showtime) as Samantha Carter; Michelle Trachtenberg – Buffy the Vampire Slayer (The WB) as Dawn Summers

== Special awards ==
=== George Pal Memorial Award ===
- Sam Raimi

=== Life Career Award ===
- Brian Grazer
- Robert Englund

=== President's Award ===
- Dustin Lance Black (for the direction of the documentary My Life with Count Dracula)

=== Service Award ===
- Bob Burns III (for his efforts to house and restore props from classic genre films)

=== Special Award ===
- Shadow of the Vampire (for its behind-the-scenes take on director F. W. Murnau's classic vampire movie Nosferatu, eine Symphonie des Grauens)
