= 73rd Academy Awards =

- Official poster by Alex Swart
- Date: March 25, 2001
- Site: Shrine Auditorium; Los Angeles, California, U.S.
- Hosted by: Steve Martin
- Preshow hosts: Chris Connelly; Julie Moran; Jim Moret
- Produced by: Gil Cates
- Directed by: Louis J. Horvitz

Highlights
- Best Picture: Gladiator
- Most awards: Gladiator (5)
- Most nominations: Gladiator (12)

TV in the United States
- Network: ABC
- Duration: 3 hours, 23 minutes
- Ratings: 42.9 million 26.2% (Nielsen ratings)

The 73rd Academy Awards ceremony, presented by the Academy of Motion Picture Arts and Sciences (AMPAS), honored the best of 2000 in film and took place on March 25, 2001, at the Shrine Auditorium in Los Angeles, beginning at 5:30 p.m. PST / 8:30 p.m. EST. During the ceremony, AMPAS presented Academy Awards (commonly referred to as Oscars) in 23 categories. The ceremony, televised in the United States by ABC, was produced by Gil Cates and was directed by Louis J. Horvitz. Actor Steve Martin hosted the show for the first time. Three weeks earlier in a ceremony at the Regent Beverly Wilshire Hotel in Beverly Hills, California held on March 3, the Academy Awards for Technical Achievement were presented by host Renée Zellweger.

Gladiator won five awards, including Best Picture. Other winners included Crouching Tiger, Hidden Dragon and Traffic with four awards and Almost Famous, Big Mama, Erin Brockovich, Father and Daughter, How the Grinch Stole Christmas, Into the Arms of Strangers: Stories of the Kindertransport, Pollock, Quiero Ser, U-571, and Wonder Boys with one. The telecast garnered almost 43 million viewers in the United States.

== Winners and nominees ==
The nominees for the 73rd Academy Awards were announced on February 13, 2001, by Robert Rehme, president of the academy, and Academy Award-winning actress Kathy Bates. Gladiator received the most nominations with twelve. Crouching Tiger, Hidden Dragon came in second with ten.

The winners were announced during the awards ceremony on March 25, 2001. Gladiator became the first film to win Best Picture without a directing or screenwriting win since 1949's All the King's Men. Best Director winner Steven Soderbergh, who received nominations for both Erin Brockovich and Traffic (for which he won the award), was the second person to receive double directing nominations in the same year. (Note: Previously Michael Curtiz received two nominations in 1939. Additionally, in 1930 Frank Lloyd received a single nomination for directing three separate films and won for one of them.) Crouching Tiger, Hidden Dragon became the third film nominated simultaneously for Best Picture and Best Foreign Language Film in the same year. (Note: Z and Life Is Beautiful were the two previous films to have accomplished this feat.) With four wins, the film tied with Fanny and Alexander as the most awarded foreign language film in Academy Awards history (Note: Subsequently, the record has been also tied by Parasite (2019) and All Quiet on the Western Front (2022).) By virtue of his brother's Best Supporting Actor nomination for 1988's Running on Empty, Best Supporting Actor nominee Joaquin Phoenix and River became the first pair of brothers to earn acting nominations.

=== Awards ===
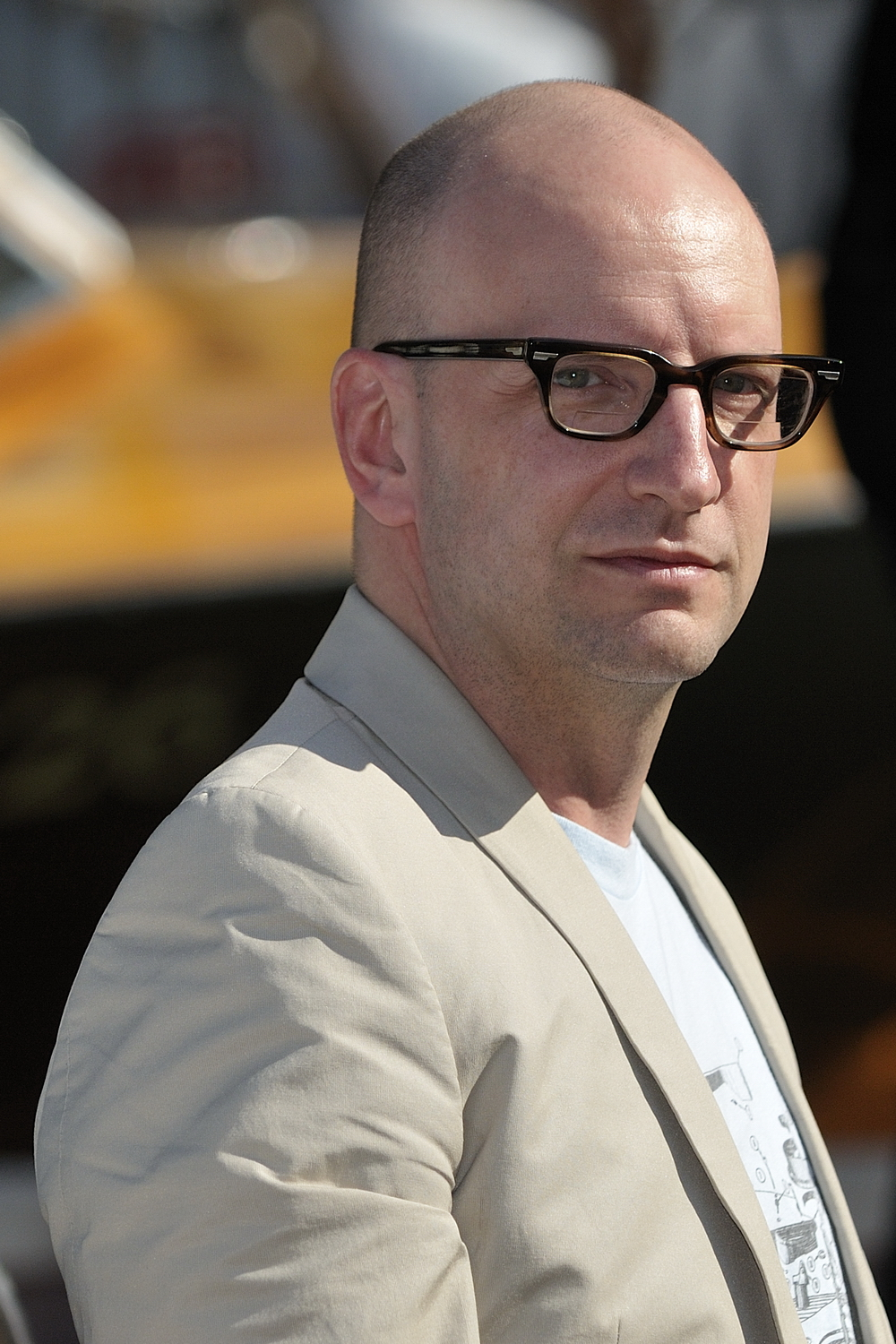
Steven Soderbergh, Best Director winner

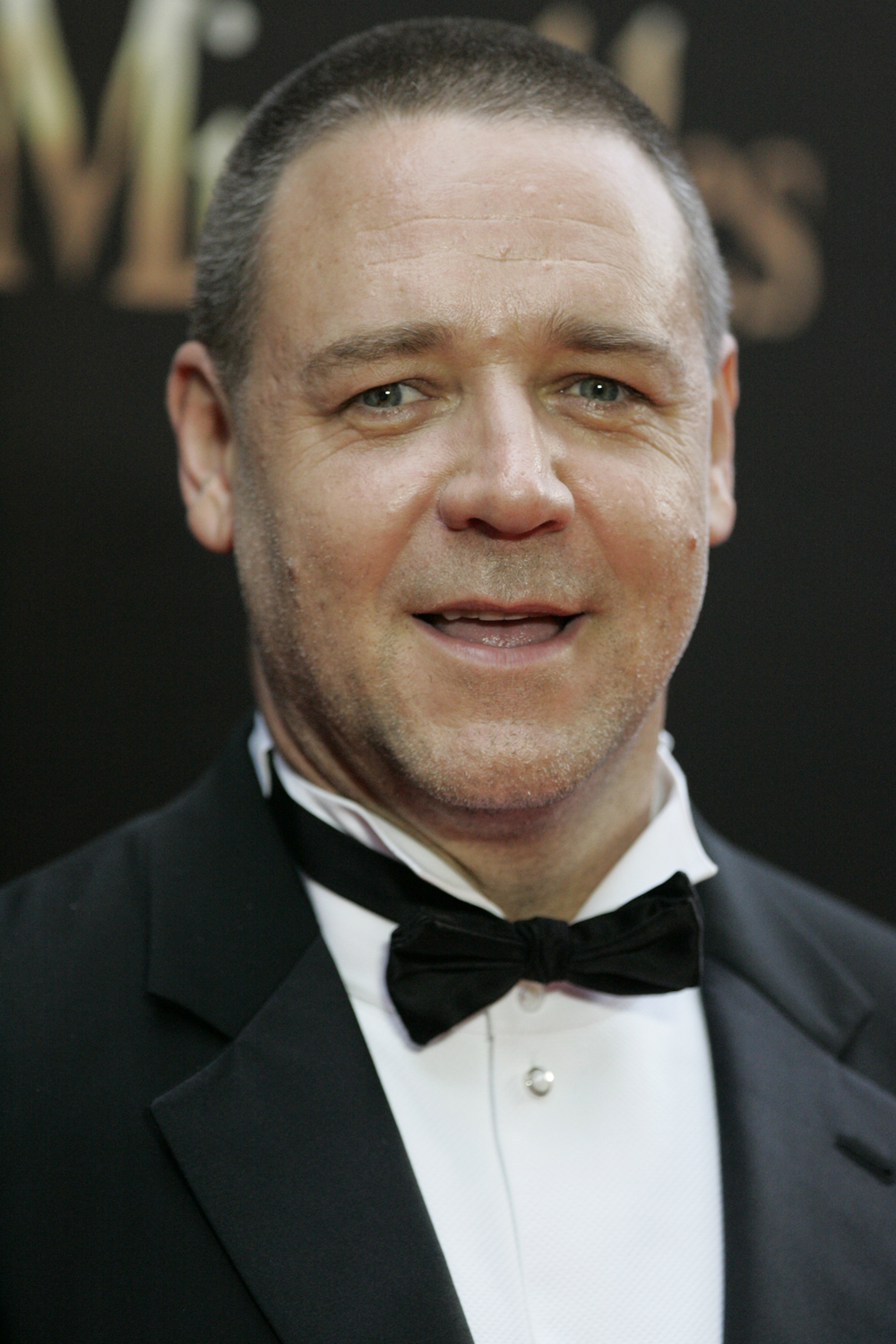
Russell Crowe, Best Actor winner

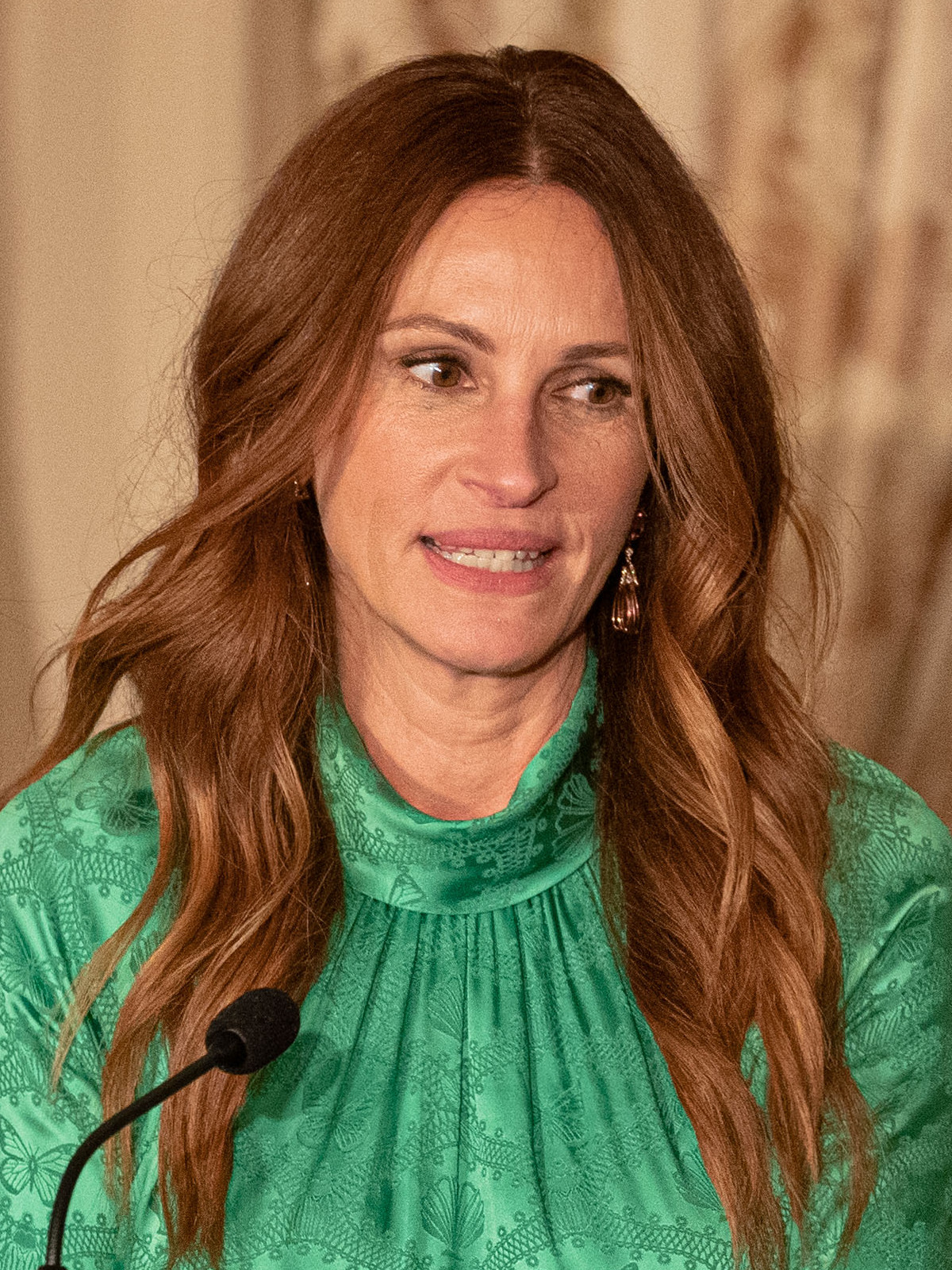
Julia Roberts, Best Actress winner

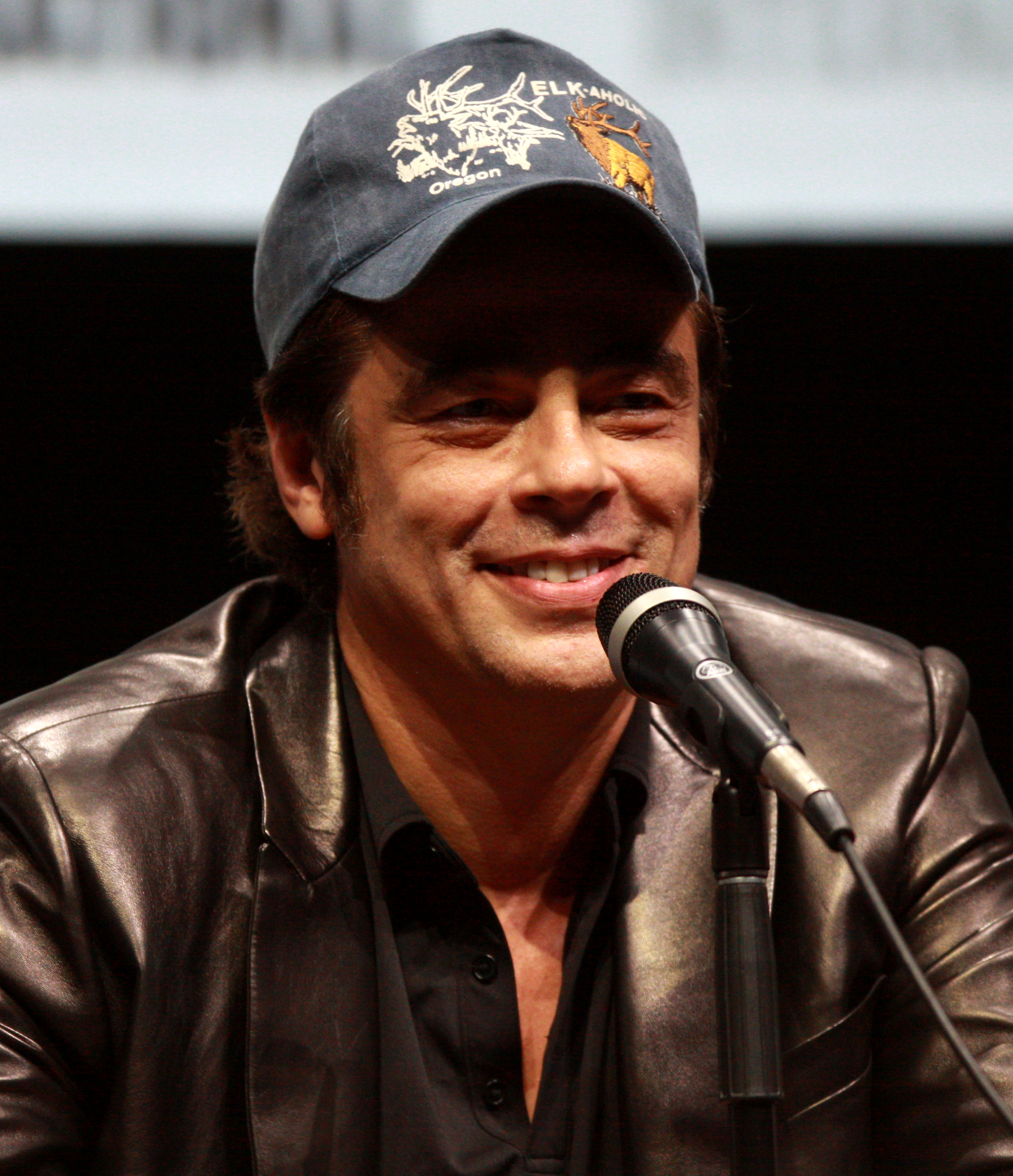
Benicio del Toro, Best Supporting Actor winner

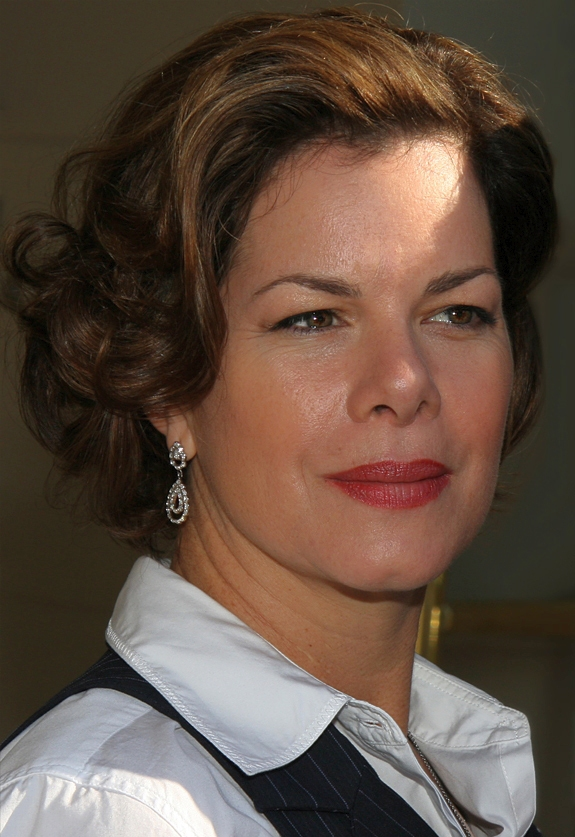
Marcia Gay Harden, Best Supporting Actress winner

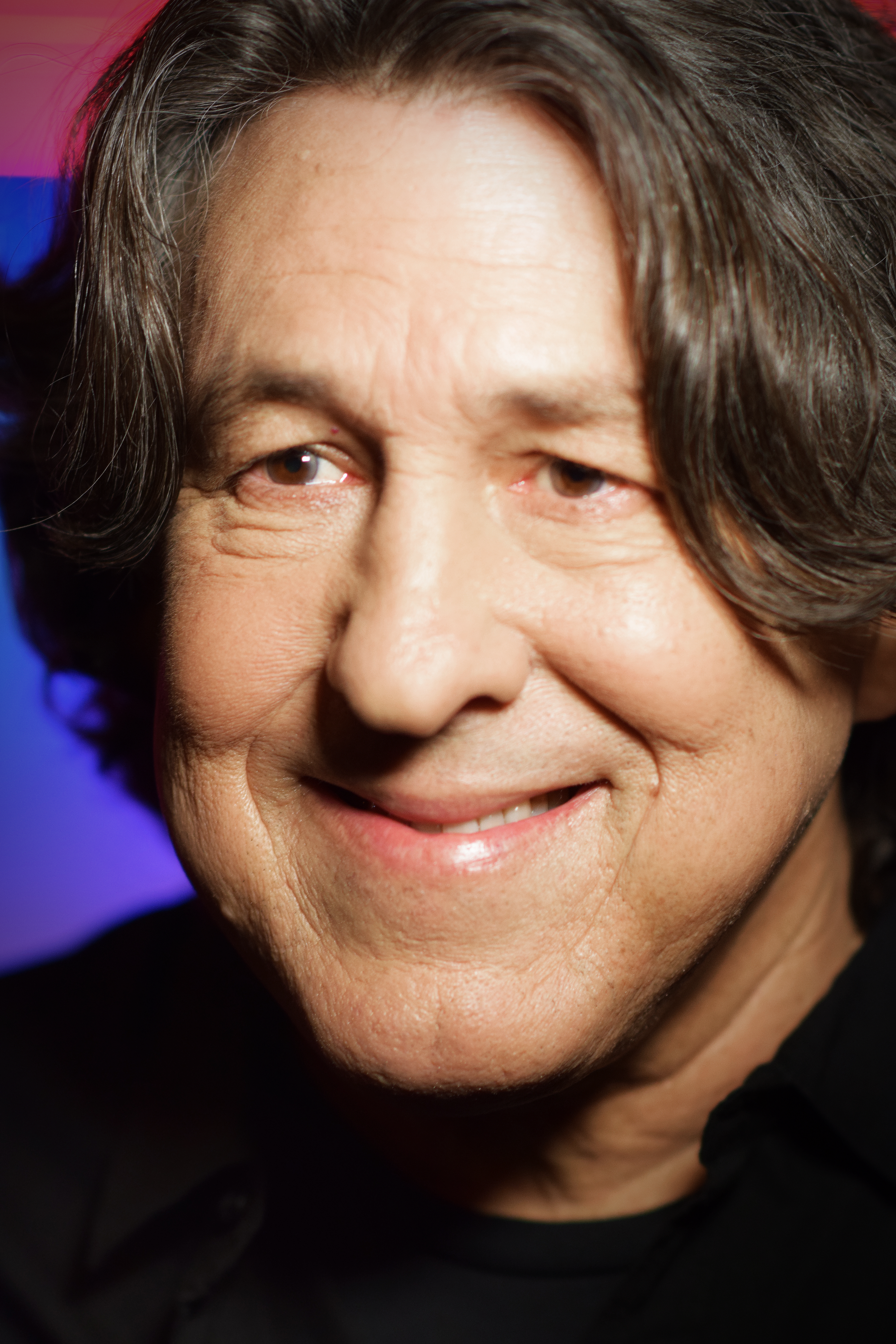
Cameron Crowe, Best Original Screenplay winner

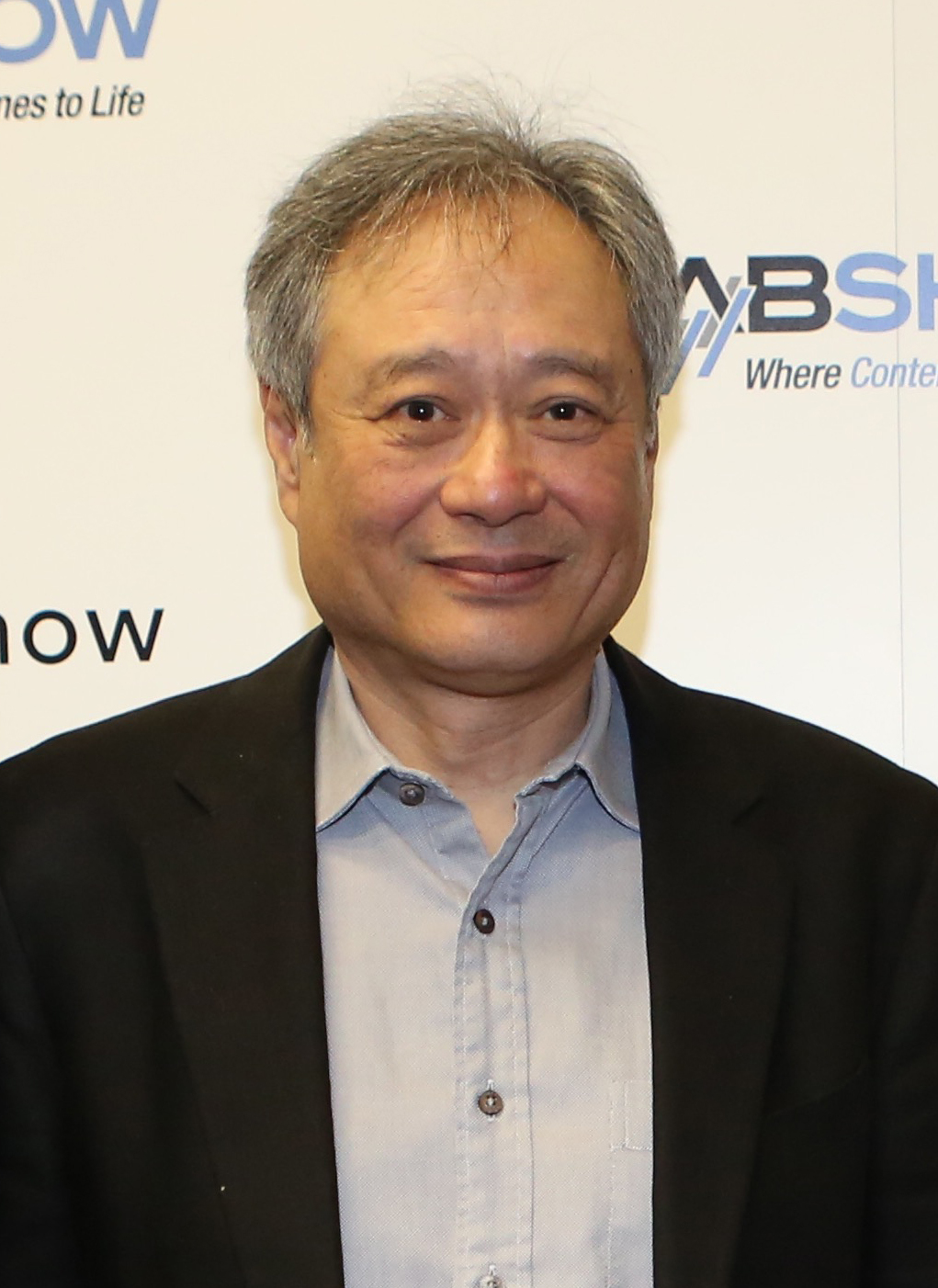
Ang Lee, Best Foreign Language Film winner

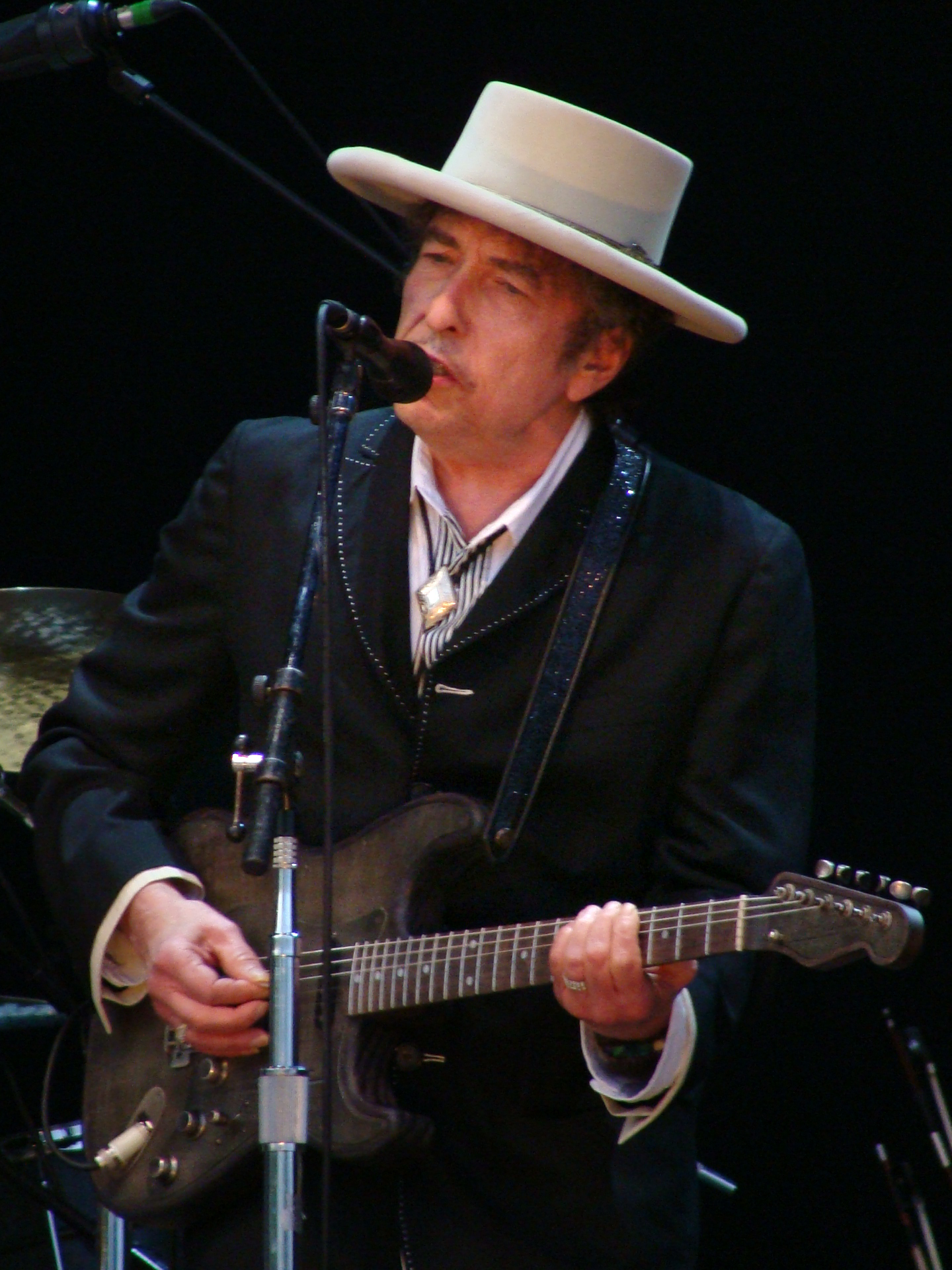
Bob Dylan, Best Original Song winner

Winners are listed first, highlighted in boldface, and indicated with a double dagger (‡).

**Best Picture**: **Gladiator – Douglas Wick, David Franzoni, and Branko Lustig, producers‡**; Chocolat – David Brown, Kit Golden, and Leslie Holleran, producers; Crouching Tiger, Hidden Dragon – Bill Kong, Hsu Li-kong, and Ang Lee, producers; Erin Brockovich – Danny DeVito, Michael Shamberg, and Stacey Sher, producers; Traffic – Marshall Herskovitz, Edward Zwick, and Laura Bickford, producers	**Best Directing**: **Steven Soderbergh – Traffic**‡; Stephen Daldry – Billy Elliot; Ang Lee – Crouching Tiger, Hidden Dragon; Steven Soderbergh – Erin Brockovich; Ridley Scott – Gladiator
**Best Actor in a Leading Role**: **Russell Crowe – Gladiator as General Maximus Decimus Meridius**‡; Javier Bardem – Before Night Falls as Reinaldo Arenas; Tom Hanks – Cast Away as Chuck Noland; Ed Harris – Pollock as Jackson Pollock; Geoffrey Rush – Quills as the Marquis de Sade	**Best Actress in a Leading Role**: **Julia Roberts – Erin Brockovich as Erin Brockovich**‡; Joan Allen – The Contender as Laine Hanson; Juliette Binoche – Chocolat as Vianne Rocher; Ellen Burstyn – Requiem for a Dream as Sara Goldfarb; Laura Linney – You Can Count on Me as Sammy Prescott
**Best Actor in a Supporting Role**: **Benicio del Toro – Traffic as Javier Rodriguez**‡; Jeff Bridges – The Contender as President Jackson Evans; Willem Dafoe – Shadow of the Vampire as Max Schreck; Albert Finney – Erin Brockovich as Edward L. Masry; Joaquin Phoenix – Gladiator as Commodus	**Best Actress in a Supporting Role**: **Marcia Gay Harden – Pollock as Lee Krasner**‡; Judi Dench – Chocolat as Armande Voizin; Kate Hudson – Almost Famous as Penny Lane; Frances McDormand – Almost Famous as Elaine Miller; Julie Walters – Billy Elliot as Miss Wilkinson
**Best Writing (Screenplay Written Directly for the Screen)**: **Almost Famous – Cameron Crowe**‡; Billy Elliot – Lee Hall; Erin Brockovich – Susannah Grant; Gladiator – Screenplay by David Franzoni, John Logan, and William Nicholson; Story by David Franzoni; You Can Count on Me – Kenneth Lonergan	**Best Writing (Screenplay Based on Material Previously Produced or Published)**: **Traffic – Stephen Gaghan based on the British TV series Traffik created by Simon Moore**‡; Chocolat – Robert Nelson Jacobs based on the novel by Joanne Harris; Crouching Tiger, Hidden Dragon – James Schamus, Hui-Ling Wang, and Kuo Jung Tsai based on the book by Wang Dulu; O Brother, Where Art Thou? – Joel Coen and Ethan Coen based on the Odyssey by Homer; Wonder Boys – Steve Kloves based on the novel by Michael Chabon
**Best Foreign Language Film**: **Crouching Tiger, Hidden Dragon (Taiwan) in Mandarin – Ang Lee**‡; Amores Perros (Mexico) in Spanish – Alejandro González Iñárritu; Divided We Fall (Czech Republic) in Czech – Jan Hřebejk; Everybody's Famous! (Belgium) in Dutch and English – Dominique Deruddere; The Taste of Others (France) in French – Agnès Jaoui	**Best Documentary (Feature)**: **Into the Arms of Strangers: Stories of the Kindertransport – Mark Jonathan Harris and Deborah Oppenheimer**‡; Legacy – Tod Lending; Long Night's Journey into Day – Frances Reid and Deborah Hoffmann; Scottsboro: An American Tragedy – Barak Goodman and Daniel Anker; Sound and Fury – Josh Aronson and Roger Weisberg
**Best Documentary (Short Subject)**: **Big Mama – Tracy Seretean**‡; Curtain Call – Chuck Braverman and Steve Kalafer; Dolphins – Greg MacGillivray and Alec Lorimore; The Man on Lincoln's Nose – Daniel Raim; On Tiptoe: Gentle Steps to Freedom – Eric Simonson and Leelai Demoz	**Best Short Film (Live Action)**: **Quiero ser (I want to be...) – Florian Gallenberger**‡; By Courier – Peter Riegert and Ericka Frederick; One Day Crossing – Joan Stein and Christina Lazaridi; Seraglio – Gail Lerner and Colin Campbell; A Soccer Story – Paulo Machline
**Best Short Film (Animated)**: **Father and Daughter – Michaël Dudok de Wit**‡; Periwig Maker – Steffen Schäffler and Annette Schäffler; Rejected – Don Hertzfeldt	**Best Music (Original Score)**: **Crouching Tiger, Hidden Dragon – Tan Dun**‡; Chocolat – Rachel Portman; Gladiator – Hans Zimmer; Malèna – Ennio Morricone; The Patriot – John Williams
**Best Music (Original Song)**: **"Things Have Changed" from Wonder Boys – Music and Lyrics by Bob Dylan**‡; "A Fool In Love" from Meet the Parents – Music and Lyrics by Randy Newman; "I've Seen It All" from Dancer in the Dark – Music by Björk; Lyrics by Lars von Trier and Sjón Sigurðsson; "A Love Before Time" from Crouching Tiger, Hidden Dragon – Music by Jorge Calandrelli and Tan Dun; Lyrics by James Schamus; "My Funny Friend and Me" from The Emperor's New Groove – Music by Sting and David Hartley; Lyrics by Sting	**Best Sound**: **Gladiator – Scott Millan, Bob Beemer, and Ken Weston**‡; Cast Away – Randy Thom, Tom Johnson, Dennis Sands, and William B. Kaplan; The Patriot – Kevin O'Connell, Greg P. Russell, and Lee Orloff; The Perfect Storm – John Reitz, Gregg Rudloff, David Campbell, and Keith A. Wester; U-571 – Steve Maslow, Gregg Landaker, Rick Kline, and Ivan Sharrock
**Best Sound Editing**: **U-571 – Jon Johnson**‡; Space Cowboys – Alan Robert Murray and Bub Asman	**Best Art Direction**: **Crouching Tiger, Hidden Dragon – Art Direction and Set Decoration: Timmy Yip**‡; Gladiator – Art Direction: Arthur Max; Set Decoration: Crispian Sallis; How the Grinch Stole Christmas – Art Direction: Michael Corenblith; Set Decoration: Merideth Boswell; Quills – Art Direction: Martin Childs; Set Decoration: Jill Quertier; Vatel – Art Direction: Jean Rabasse; Set Decoration: Françoise Benoît-Fresco
**Best Cinematography**: **Crouching Tiger, Hidden Dragon – Peter Pau**‡; Gladiator – John Mathieson; Malèna – Lajos Koltai; O Brother, Where Art Thou? – Roger Deakins; The Patriot – Caleb Deschanel	**Best Makeup**: **How the Grinch Stole Christmas – Rick Baker and Gail Rowell-Ryan**‡; The Cell – Michèle Burke and Edouard Henriques; Shadow of the Vampire – Ann Buchanan and Amber Sibley
**Best Costume Design**: **Gladiator – Janty Yates**‡; 102 Dalmatians – Anthony Powell; Crouching Tiger, Hidden Dragon – Timmy Yip; How the Grinch Stole Christmas – Rita Ryack; Quills – Jacqueline West	**Best Film Editing**: **Traffic – Stephen Mirrione**‡; Almost Famous – Joe Hutshing and Saar Klein; Crouching Tiger, Hidden Dragon – Tim Squyres; Gladiator – Pietro Scalia; Wonder Boys – Dede Allen
**Best Visual Effects**: **Gladiator – John Nelson, Neil Corbould, Tim Burke, and Rob Harvey**‡; Hollow Man – Scott E. Anderson, Craig Hayes, Scott Stokdyk, and Stan Parks; The Perfect Storm – Stefen Fangmeier, Habib Zargarpour, John Frazier, and Walt Conti

=== Honorary Awards ===
- To Jack Cardiff, master of light and color.
- To Ernest Lehman, in appreciation of a body of varied and enduring work.

=== Irving G. Thalberg Memorial Award ===
- Dino De Laurentiis

=== Films with multiple nominations and awards ===
The following 20 films received multiple nominations:

Nominations	Film
12	Gladiator
10	Crouching Tiger, Hidden Dragon
5	Chocolat
5	Erin Brockovich
5	Traffic
4	Almost Famous
3	Billy Elliot
3	How the Grinch Stole Christmas
3	The Patriot
3	Quills
3	Wonder Boys
2	Cast Away
2	The Contender
2	Malèna
2	O Brother, Where Art Thou?
2	The Perfect Storm
2	Pollock
2	Shadow of the Vampire
2	U-571
2	You Can Count on Me

The following three films received multiple awards:

Awards	Film
5	Gladiator
4	Crouching Tiger, Hidden Dragon
4	Traffic

== Presenters and performers ==
The following individuals, listed in order of appearance, presented awards or performed musical numbers.

=== Presenters ===
Name(s)	Role
Gina Tuttle	Announcer for the 73rd annual Academy Awards
Susan J. Helms; Yury Usachov; James S. Voss	Introducers of host Steve Martin
Catherine Zeta-Jones	Presenter of the award for Best Art Direction
Nicolas Cage	Presenter of the award for Best Supporting Actress
Russell Crowe	Presenter of the award for Best Film Editing
Ben Stiller	Presenter of the award for Best Live Action Short Film and Best Animated Short Film
Halle Berry	Introducer of the performance of Best Original Song nominee "My Funny Friend and Me"
Annette Bening	Presenter of the film Erin Brockovich on the Best Picture segment
Penélope Cruz	Presenter of the award for Best Costume Design
Robert Rehme (AMPAS president)	Giver of remarks announcing the end of his tenure as president of AMPAS
Angelina Jolie	Presenter of the award for Best Supporting Actor
Mike Myers	Presenter of the awards Best Sound and Best Sound Editing
Ben Affleck	Presenter of the film Traffic on the Best Picture segment
Julia Stiles	Introducer of the performance of Best Original Song nominee "A Love Before Time"
Julia Roberts	Presenter of the award for Best Cinematography
Morgan Freeman	Presenter of the film Crouching Tiger, Hidden Dragon on the Best Picture segment
Kate Hudson	Presenter of the award for Best Makeup
Dustin Hoffman	Presenter of the Honorary Academy Award to Jack Cardiff
Samuel L. Jackson	Presenter of the awards for Best Documentary Short Subject and Best Documentary Feature
Sarah Jessica Parker	Introducer of the performance of Best Original Song nominee "A Fool in Love"
Michelle Yeoh; Chow Yun-fat	Presenter of the award for Best Visual Effects
Renée Zellweger	Presenter of the segment of the Academy Awards for Technical Achievement and the Gordon E. Sawyer Award
Sigourney Weaver	Presenter of the film Gladiator on the Best Picture segment
Goldie Hawn	Introducer of the performance of excerpts of the nominees for Best Original Score and presenter of the award for Best Original Score
Anthony Hopkins	Presenter of the Irving G. Thalberg Memorial Award to Dino De Laurentiis
Winona Ryder	Introducer of the performance of Best Original Song nominee "I've Seen It All"
John Travolta	Presenter of the In Memoriam tribute
Juliette Binoche; Jack Valenti	Presenters of the award for Best Foreign Language Film
Jennifer Lopez	Introducer of the performance of Best Original Song nominee "Things Have Changed" and presenter of the award for Best Original Song
Hilary Swank	Presenter of the award for Best Actor
Ashley Judd	Presenter of the film Chocolat on the Best Picture segment
Julie Andrews	Presenter of the Honorary Academy Award for Ernest Lehman
Kevin Spacey	Presenter of the award for Best Actress
Tom Hanks	Introducer of presenter Arthur C. Clarke
Arthur C. Clarke	Presenter of the award for Best Screenplay Based on Material Previously Produced or Published
Tom Hanks	Presenter of the award for Best Screenplay Written Directly for the Screen/Original Screenplay
Tom Cruise	Presenter of the award for Best Director
Michael Douglas	Presenter of the award for Best Picture

=== Performers ===
Role	Name(s)	Performed
Musical Arranger and Conductor	Bill Conti	Orchestral
Performer	Sting	"My Funny Friend and Me" from The Emperor's New Groove
Performer	Coco Lee	"A Love Before Time" from Crouching Tiger, Hidden Dragon
Performers	Susanna Hoffs; Randy Newman	"A Fool in Love" from Meet the Parents
Performers	Yo-Yo Ma; Itzhak Perlman	Performed selections from the Best Original Score nominees
Performer	Björk	"I've Seen It All" from Dancer in the Dark
Performer	Bob Dylan	"Things Have Changed" from Wonder Boys

== Ceremony information ==
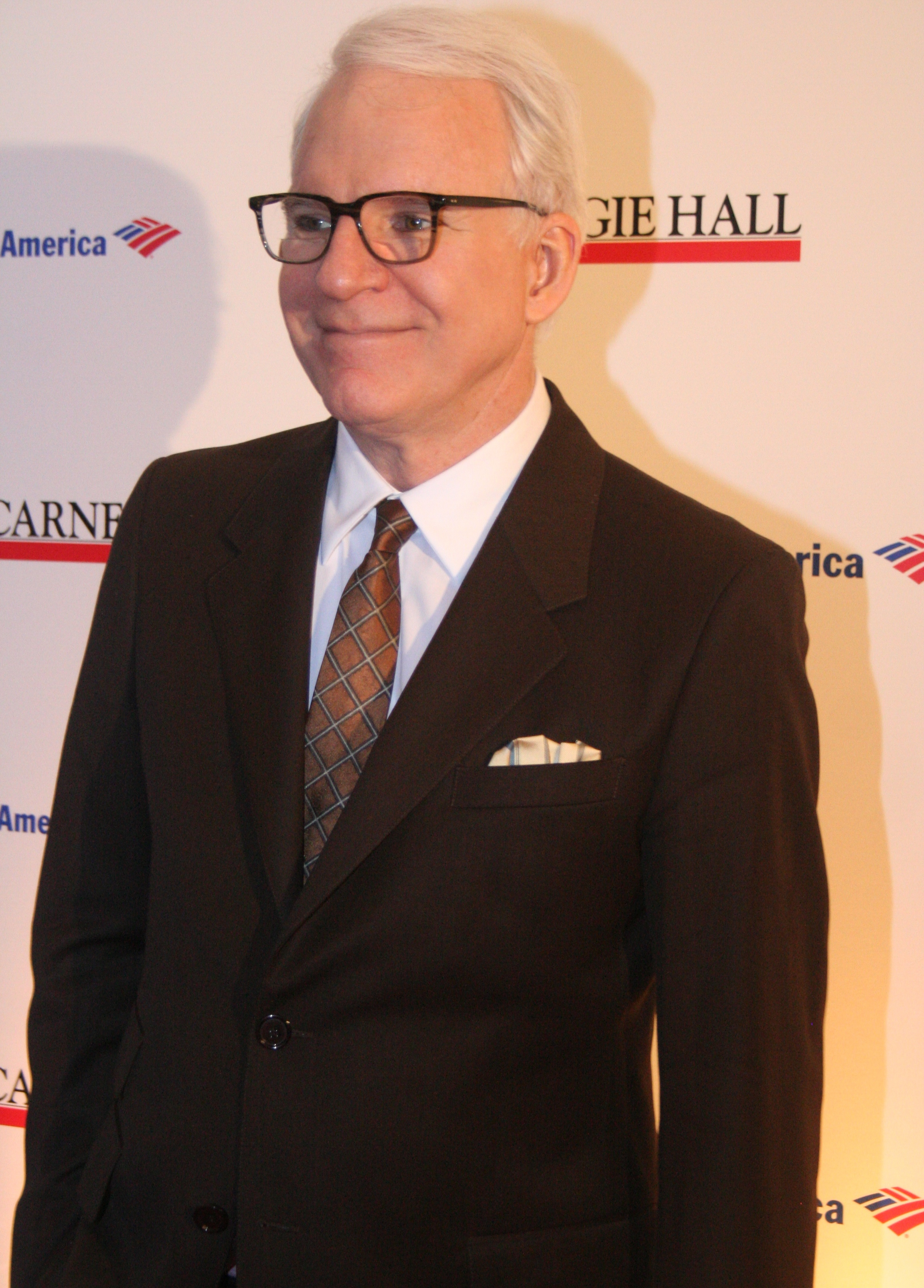
Steve Martin hosted the 73rd Academy Awards

Despite earning both critical praise and increased viewership from last year's ceremony, actor Billy Crystal announced that he would not host the ceremony for a second consecutive year. He listed his role in the film America's Sweethearts and his directing and producing duties for the made-for-television film 61* as obstacles preventing him from reprising his role as emcee. Shortly after being selected as producer for the awards gala, Gil Cates hired actor and comedian Steve Martin as host for the 2001 telecast. Cates explained his choice of Martin as host saying, "He's a movie star, he's funny, he's classy, he's literate — he'll be a wonderful host." Additionally, AMPAS president Robert Rehme approved of the selection stating, "Steve is a man of great style. I am simply elated to have him on board. He was at the top of our list, we offered and he accepted; it was as simple as that." Martin expressed his delight in hosting the gala jokingly retorting, "If you can't win 'em, join 'em."

In view of the gala taking place in the year 2001, Cates christened the show with a theme saluting the Stanley Kubrick science fiction film 2001: A Space Odyssey. In tandem with the theme, astronauts Susan J. Helms, Yury Usachov, and James S. Voss who were inside the International Space Station Alpha Destiny module during Expedition 2 appeared at the beginning of the telecast via satellite to introduce host Martin. Throughout the broadcast, the orchestra conducted by film composer Bill Conti performed a remixed version of "Also Sprach Zarathustra (2001)" composed by Brazilian jazz musician Eumir Deodato. Furthermore, 2001 author Arthur C. Clarke presented the Best Adapted Screenplay award from his home in Sri Lanka.

Several others participated in the production of the ceremony. Production designer Roy Christopher designed a new stage for the show which featured gigantic louvered cove that curved from the stage floor to the ceiling via the auditorium's backstage wall. Many media outlets described the set design resembling a cross section of a space capsule. In addition, four stainless steel arcs each carved with a silhouette of the Oscar statuette were flanked at the front and back of the stage allowing presenters and winners to pass through them. Dancer Debbie Allen choreographed the performances of the Best Original Song nominees. Musicians Yo-Yo Ma and Itzhak Perlman performed excerpts from the five nominees for Best Original Score.

=== Box office performance of nominees ===
Before the nominees were announced on February 13, the combined gross of the five Best Picture nominees was $471 million with an average of $94 million per film. Gladiator was the highest earner among the Best Picture nominees with $186.6 million in domestic box office receipts. The film was followed by Erin Brockovich ($125.5 million), Traffic ($71.2 million), Crouching Tiger, Hidden Dragon ($60.7 million) and finally, Chocolat ($27 million).

Of the top 50 grossing movies of the year, 49 nominations went to 15 films on the list. Only Cast Away (3rd), Gladiator (4th), Erin Brockovich (12th), Traffic (31st), and Crouching Tiger, Hidden Dragon (41st) directing, acting, screenwriting, or Best Picture. The other top 50 box office hits that earned nominations were Dr. Seuss' How the Grinch Stole Christmas (1st), The Perfect Storm (5th), Meet the Parents (7th), The Patriot (17th), Space Cowboys (23rd), The Emperor's New Groove (25th), U-571 (26th), Hollow Man (30th), 102 Dalmatians (38th), and The Cell (40th).

=== Critical reviews ===
The show received a positive reception from most media outlets. Television critic Ken Tucker of Entertainment Weekly wrote, "As host, Martin was typically dapper and comfortably low-key, pacing himself throughout the evening." He also added, "The Oscars seemed as bouncy and well oiled as Russell Crowe's 'do—a '50s Gene Vincent-style quiff that made for a cool rock & roll segue into Dylan's Best Song performance." USA Today critic Robert Bianco gave an average review of the telecast but commended the host stating, "Martin was a droll delight — as amusing as Oscar star Billy Crystal, but in an entirely different way. Where Crystal was all hard work and good humor, the more deadpan and deceptively proper Martin let his nastier jokes sneak up on you." Tom Shales from The Washington Post commented Martin was "the best Oscar host since Johnny Carson." In addition, he quipped that "The show was almost too dignified for its own good, yet it remained exciting and entertaining even at its loftier and more pretentious moments."

Some media outlets were more critical of the show. Barry Garron of The Hollywood Reporter commented, "Here was veteran producer Gil Cates presiding over one of the few Academy Award presentations that ended on time and still managed to be too long." Additionally, he quipped "If nothing else, tonight's show proved that, despite the many Awards most viewers have no interest in, the show can be done in three and a half hours." The Atlanta Journal-Constitution columnist Steve Murray remarked, "It wasn't just that Martin lacked the impish, insider energy of Billy Crystal – or even Whoopi Goldberg's hypnotically awful self-satisfaction. No, the 73rd annual Academy Awards still seemed to go on forever, even though it was one of the shortest in years." Television critic John Carman of the San Francisco Chronicle wrote, "Even with a rookie host, Steve Martin, the Academy Awards show was long on decorum and disappointingly short on verve."

=== Ratings and reception ===
The American telecast on ABC drew in an average of 42.9 million people over its length, which was a 7% decrease from the previous year's ceremony. An estimated 72.2 million total viewers watched all or part of the awards. The show also earned lower Nielsen ratings compared to the previous ceremony with 26.2% of households watching over a 40 share. In addition, it garnered a lower 18–49 demo rating with a 17.8 rating among viewers in that demographic.

In July 2001, the ceremony presentation received eight nominations at the 53rd Primetime Emmys. Two months later, the ceremony won one of those nominations for Outstanding Sound Mixing For A Variety Or Music Series Or Special (Edward J. Greene, Tom Vicari, Bob Douglass).

== "In Memoriam" ==
The annual "In Memoriam" tribute, presented by actor John Travolta, honored the following people.

- Douglas Fairbanks Jr. – Actor
- Marie Windsor – Actress
- Beah Richards – Actress
- Edward Anhalt – Screenwriter
- Billy Barty – Actor
- Julius Epstein – Screenwriter
- George Montgomery – Actor
- Ring Lardner Jr. – Screenwriter
- Steve Reeves – Actor and body builder
- Jean Peters – Actress
- Vittorio Gassman – Actor
- Jean-Pierre Aumont – Actor
- Dale Evans – Actress and singer
- Gwen Verdon – Actress and dancer
- Stanley Kramer – Producer, Director
- Jack Nitzsche – Composer
- Harold Nicholas – Tap dancer
- Howard W. Koch – Producer, Academy President
- Loretta Young – Actress
- Richard Farnsworth – Actor and stuntman
- John Gielgud – Actor
- Jason Robards Jr. – Actor
- Claire Trevor – Actress
- Alec Guinness – Actor
- Walter Matthau – Actor and comedian

== See also ==
- 7th Screen Actors Guild Awards
- 21st Golden Raspberry Awards
- 43rd Grammy Awards
- 53rd Primetime Emmy Awards
- 54th British Academy Film Awards
- 55th Tony Awards
- 58th Golden Globe Awards
- List of submissions to the 73rd Academy Awards for Best Foreign Language Film

== Bibliography ==
- Bona, Damien (2002), Inside Oscar 2, New York, United States: Ballantine Books, ISBN 0-345-44970-3
- Crouse, Richard (2005), Reel Winners: Movie Award Trivia, Toronto, Canada: Dundurn Press, ISBN 1-550-02574-0
- Pond, Steve (2005), The Big Show: High Times and Dirty Dealings Backstage at the Academy Awards, New York, United States: Faber and Faber, ISBN 0-571-21193-3
- Terrance, Vincent (2013). Television Specials: 5,336 Entertainment Programs, 1936–2012 (5 ed.). Jefferson, North Carolina, United States: Ballantine Books, McFarland & Company. ISBN 978-1-4766-1240-9. OCLC 844373010.
