= 2001 Academy Awards =

2001 Academy Awards may refer to:

- 73rd Academy Awards, the Academy Awards ceremony that took place in 2001 and honored the best in film for 2000
- 74th Academy Awards, the 2002 ceremony honoring the best in film for 2001
