= 2000 Academy Awards =

2000 Academy Awards may refer to:

- 72nd Academy Awards, the Academy Awards ceremony that took place in 2000
- 73rd Academy Awards, the 2001 ceremony honoring the best in film for 2000
- Academy Awards and nominations for the 1968 film 2001: A Space Odyssey
