= Tamara Goldsworthy =

Tamara Goldsworthy is a Los Angeles–based cinematographer. Her most notable contributions have been in the field of documentary film making. During her career, Tamara shot many award-winning films including the 2001 Academy Award-winning documentary short Big Mama.

Tamara Goldsworthy has worked with renowned filmmakers Haskel Wexler, Joan Churchill, and Barbara Kopple. Her work is shown regularly on PBS, BBC, Animal Planet as well as international film festivals.
