= On Tiptoe: Gentle Steps to Freedom =

2000 film

- Directed by: Eric Simonson
- Produced by: Leelai Demoz; Eric Simonson
- Edited by: Tina Imahara
- Distributed by: HBO (TV); California Newsreel (home video)
- Release date: 2000
- Running time: 58 minutes
- Country: United States
- Language: English

On Tiptoe: Gentle Steps to Freedom, also called On Tiptoe: The Music of Ladysmith Black Mambazo is a 2000 American short documentary film directed by Eric Simonson. It tells the story of South African singers Ladysmith Black Mambazo. It was nominated for an Academy Award for Best Documentary Short.

== Awards and nominations ==
Incomplete list of awards for On Tiptoe: Gentle Steps to Freedom
Year	Award	Category	Result
2000	73rd Academy Awards	Best Documentary Short Subject	Nominated

== See also ==
- List of documentary films
- List of American films of 2000
