= Leelai Demoz =

American filmmaker

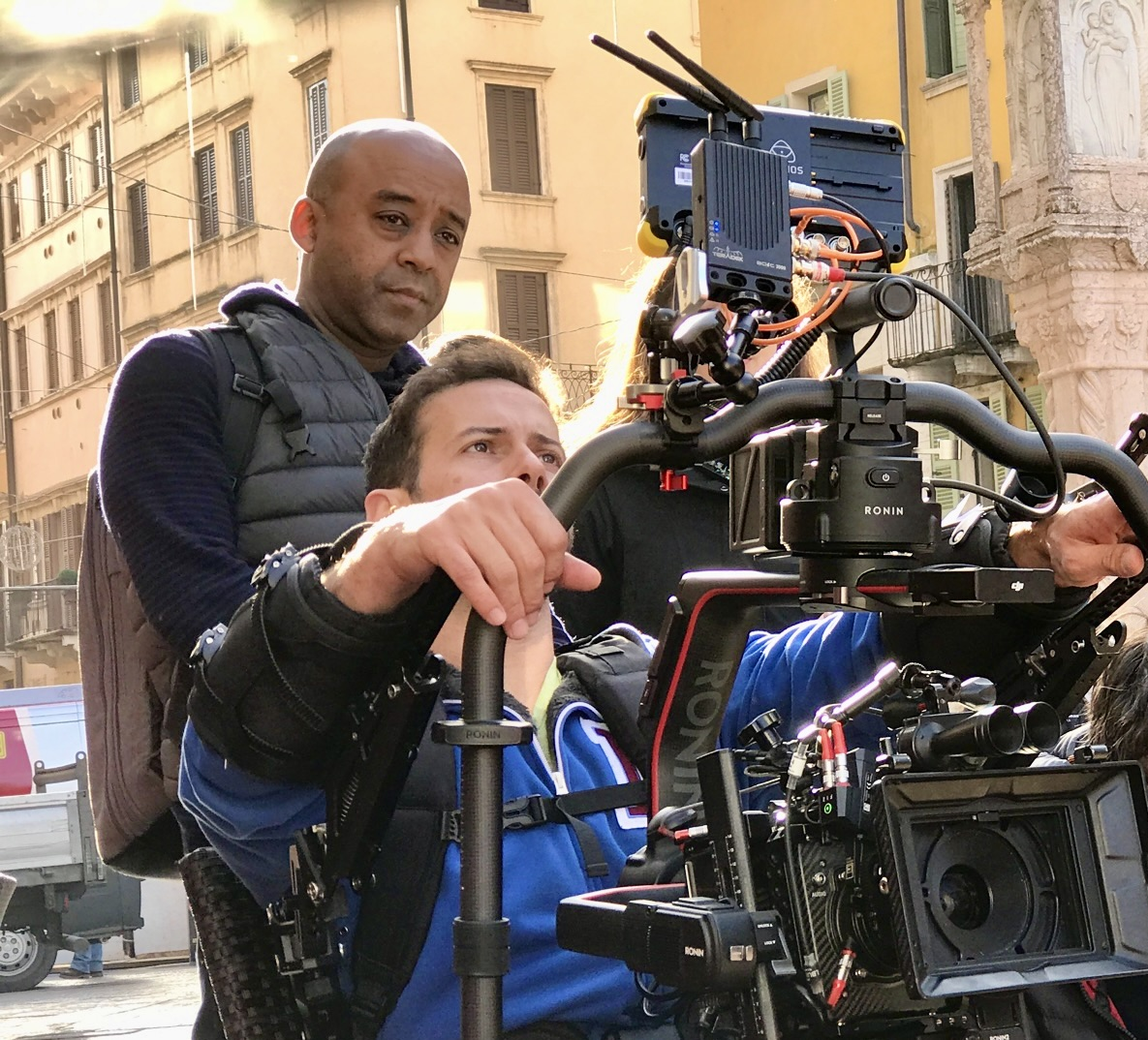
- Leelai Demoz on set in Italy (2023)
- Occupations: Filmmaker, Producer, Theater Artist
- Known for: On Tiptoe, Difret, Steppenwolf Theatre Company, Broadway theatre, Academy of Motion Picture Arts and Sciences

Leelai Demoz is a producer and theater artist. He is an Academy Award–nominated producer whose work spans film, television, and theatre.

He is the founding partner of Highwire Media, a film, television, and theatre production company based in Chicago.

From 2019 to 2022, Demoz served as the Associate Artistic Director of the Steppenwolf Theatre Company in Chicago.

== Career ==
Demoz's documentary On Tiptoe: Gentle Steps to Freedom (2000), about the South African group Ladysmith Black Mambazo, was nominated for an Academy Award for Best Documentary (Short Subject). The film also received an Emmy Award nomination.

Demoz was a producer of Difret (2014), executively produced by Angelina Jolie. The film premiered at the Sundance Film Festival, where it won the World Cinema Dramatic Audience Award. Difret also won the Panorama Audience Award at the Berlin International Film Festival.

He is a former recipient of an SFFS / KRF Filmmaking Grant.

At Steppenwolf Theatre, Demoz helped develop Steppenwolf NOW, the company's digital programming during the COVID-19 pandemic.

Demoz is a public speaker and panelist. He has participated in programs such as "Black History 24/7/365" at Fleetwood-Jourdain Theatre, and events at UCLA's African Studies Center.

Earlier in his career, Demoz served as the Executive Director of the Schoolhouse Foundation in New York.

== Selected filmography ==
- On Tiptoe: Gentle Steps to Freedom (2000) — Director, Producer
- Difret (2014) — Producer

== Personal life ==
Demoz is married to Kelly Demoz (née Kelly Marie Moriarty).
