= Big Mama (film) =

- Directed by: Tracy Seretean
- Produced by: Tracy Seretean
- Cinematography: Tamara Goldsworthy
- Edited by: Geof Bartz
- Music by: Bobby McFerrin; Rob Mounsey
- Distributed by: California Newsreel
- Release date: 2000
- Running time: 35 minutes
- Country: United States
- Language: English

Big Mama is a 2000 short documentary film by American Tracy Seretean. It chronicles the struggle of 89-year-old Viola Dees (1908–2000) and her fight to retain custody of her grandson. It illustrates many of the difficulties facing an increasing number of the grandparents who are raising their grandchildren in the United States today, because of family crises related to drugs and prison. It was shown on HBO and won an Oscar for Best Documentary Short Subject.

== Synopsis ==
The film follows 18 months in the life of Viola Dees (89 years old) as she tries to persuade Los Angeles authorities that she can care for her grandson, 9-year-old Walter. Born to a drug-addicted mother, Walter was put into foster care. Dees gained his release to her care when he was age four. By then he was very disturbed, traumatized by the early death of his father and the disappearance of his mother. But he appeared bright and sweetly loving to his grandmother.

The film focuses on the continuous battle against age discrimination faced by Dees and many like her. While contending with her own declining health, and a bureaucratic and legal system that continually threatened to separate her from her grandson, Dees fights the misconception that age supersedes one's ability to love and care for a child.

The film follows the family as they deal with several blows. Dees suffers a heart attack, provoking hostile and disturbed behavior from Walter. He burned a magazine in his bedroom, which resulted in a house fire, destroying their home. He was admitted to a psychiatric hospital, where the doctors determined that Dees was no longer able to handle her grandson. They would not release him to her until she agreed to place him in long-term residential care. After a challenging search, Walter is accepted at an appropriate facility and thrives during his year there. However, when treatment was completed, social workers determined that Dees was too frail to care for him, and Walter was placed again in a foster home. Walter's aunts and uncles were unable to take him in, possibly because they felt unqualified to deal with his often threatening and troubled behavior.

== Awards and nominations ==
- 2001 Winner, Academy Award, Best Documentary Short Subject
- 2001 Winner, Heartland Film Festival, Crystal Heart Award
- 2001 Winner, San Francisco International Film Festival, Golden Gate Award

== See also ==
- List of documentary films
