= Shadow of the Vampire =

2000 film by E. Elias Merhige

- Theatrical release poster
- Directed by: E. Elias Merhige
- Written by: Steven Katz
- Produced by: Nicolas Cage; Jeff Levine
- Starring: John Malkovich; Willem Dafoe; Cary Elwes; John Aden Gillet; Eddie Izzard; Udo Kier; Catherine McCormack; Ronan Vibert
- Cinematography: Lou Bogue
- Edited by: Chris Wyatt
- Music by: Dan Jones
- Production companies: BBC Films; Saturn Films
- Distributed by: Metrodome Distribution (United Kingdom); Lions Gate Films (United States)
- Release dates: 15 May 2000 (Cannes); 29 December 2000 (United States); 2 February 2001 (United Kingdom)
- Running time: 92 minutes
- Countries: Luxembourg; United Kingdom; United States
- Languages: English; German; Luxembourgish
- Budget: $8 million
- Box office: $11.2 million

Shadow of the Vampire is a 2000 meta-film directed by E. Elias Merhige, written by Steven Katz, and starring John Malkovich and Willem Dafoe. It is a fictionalized account of the making of the classic vampire film Nosferatu, eine Symphonie des Grauens (1922), directed by F. W. Murnau, during which the film crew begin to have disturbing suspicions about their lead actor, Max Schreck. The film's premise is based on an urban legend which suggests that Schreck was not an actor, but in fact a vampire himself. It borrows several techniques of silent films, including the use of intertitles to explain elided action, and iris lenses.

A co-production between BBC Films and Nicolas Cage's Saturn Films, Shadow of the Vampire was shot in Luxembourg. The film received positive reviews from critics and received nominations at the 73rd Academy Awards for Best Makeup and Best Supporting Actor for Dafoe's performance.

== Plot ==
In 1921, German director F. W. Murnau is shooting Nosferatu, an unauthorized adaptation of Bram Stoker's novel Dracula. Murnau keeps his team in the dark about their schedule and the actor playing the vampire Count Orlok. It is left to the film's other main actor, Gustav von Wangenheim, to explain that the lead is an obscure German theater performer named Max Schreck, who is a character actor. To involve himself fully in his role, Schreck will only appear amongst the cast and crew in makeup, will only be filmed at night, and will never break character.

After filming scenes in a studio with leading actress Greta Schröder, Murnau takes his cast and crew to a remote inn in Czechoslovakia to film. The landlady becomes distressed at Murnau removing crucifixes around the inn, and the cameraman, Wolfgang Muller, falls into a strange, hypnotic state. Gustav discovers a bottle of blood amongst the team's food supplies, and someone delivers a caged ferret in the night to a not yet fully revealed Schreck.

One night, Murnau rushes his team to a nearby ancient Slovak castle for the first scene featuring Count Orlok. Schreck appears for the first time, and his appearance and behavior impress and disturb them. The film's producer, Albin Grau, is confused when Murnau tells him that he originally found Schreck in the castle. Soon after the completion of the scene, Wolfgang is found collapsed in the tunnel into which Schreck had receded.

While filming a dinner scene, Gustav accidentally cuts his finger. Schreck reacts wildly and tries drinking from Gustav's wound. Grau orders filming ended for the night, and the crew rushes from the castle, leaving Schreck behind. Alone, Schreck examines the camera equipment, fascinated by footage of a sunrise. With Wolfgang near death, Murnau brings in another cameraman, Fritz Arno Wagner. Murnau threatens Schreck if he does not control himself in Murnau's absence—a threat that Schreck challenges due to his immortality.

While Murnau returns to Berlin to calm financiers of the film, Schreck approaches Grau and the screenwriter, Henrik Galeen, who believe he is still in character. Schreck points out Dracula's loneliness and the sadness of him trying to remember how to do otherwise mundane chores that he has not needed to perform for centuries. Schreck snatches a bat and sucks its blood. Grau and Galeen, thanks to their drunkenness on schnapps, are impressed by what they assume is talented acting. Later that night, Schreck kills a crewmember on the film's set.

The production moves to the island of Heligoland to film the final scenes. Murnau, in a laudanum-induced stupor, admits to Grau and Fritz that Schreck is an actual vampire, and in return for his cooperation, Murnau has promised him Greta. The two realize they are trapped on the island, leaving no choice but to complete the film that night.

On set, Greta becomes hysterical after noticing that Schreck casts no reflection. Murnau, Grau, and Fritz drug her with laudanum and film as Schreck feeds on Greta, with the laudanum in her blood putting Schreck to sleep. At dawn, the three attempt to open a metal door and let in sunlight to destroy Schreck but discover that the vampire had cut the chain to the mechanism, trapping them. Fritz and Grau attack Schreck, only to be killed. Murnau resumes filming and, crazed, ignores the deaths of his colleagues.

Schreck returns to feed on Greta as Murnau films. Galeen and the crew arrive and lift the door, destroying Schreck with the sunlight. Having become obsessed with the film, Murnau asks for an end slate from his rattled crew. After they oblige, he stops the camera and calmly states, "I think we have it."

== Cast ==
- John Malkovich as Friedrich Wilhelm Murnau, the director of Nosferatu
- Willem Dafoe as Max Schreck, who plays Count Orlok
- Cary Elwes as Fritz Arno Wagner, the cinematographer
- John Aden Gillet as Henrik Galeen, the screenwriter
- Eddie Izzard as Gustav von Wangenheim, who plays Thomas Hutter
- Udo Kier as Albin Grau, occultist; the producer, art director, and costume designer
- Catherine McCormack as Greta Schröder, who plays Ellen Hutter
- Ronan Vibert as Wolfgang Muller
- Nicholas Elliott as Paul
- Sophie Langevin as Elke
- Myriam Muller as Maria

== Production ==
The premise of Count Orlok being played by an actual Nosferatu in the eponymous film was recorded by Ado Kyrou, who in his 1953 book Le Surréalisme au Cinéma incorrectly wrote: "The credits name the music hall actor Max Schreck as the vampire's performer, but it is well-known that this information is deliberately untrue. No one has ever been able to reveal the identity of this extraordinary actor whose brilliant face made him forever unrecognizable. [...] What is hidden behind the character of Nosferatu? Could it be Nosferatu himself?" Although ill-informed, Kyrou's notion that the screen monster was also a real-life monster would popularize the mystery around Nosferatu.

The film was produced by Nicolas Cage's Saturn Films. Cage originally intended to play Schreck, but later cast Dafoe when he expressed interest in the role. Cage stated he always wanted Malkovich as Murnau. Cage has previously acted with Malkovich in Con Air (1997) and Dafoe in Wild at Heart (1990). Members of the online game the Hollywood Stock Exchange were able to donate a small sum towards the film's production in exchange for listing their names on the DVD release of the film as "virtual producers". E. Elias Merhige was hired to direct as Cage had wanted to work with him ever since watching a tape of his previous film, Begotten (1989), given to him by Crispin Glover.

The film's working title was Burned to Light, but Merhige decided to change the name of the film when Dafoe asked, "Who's Ed?"; the actor thought the title was Burn Ed to Light. To create the aesthetic of old film, cinematographer Lou Bogue shot much of the film with Kodak Vision 800T film stock – a high speed specialty stock with very coarse grain – in Super 35mm format, which further enhanced the effect when cropped and enlarged to anamorphic.

== Release ==
Shadow of the Vampire had its world premiere at the 2000 Cannes Film Festival. It was given a limited release in the United States on 29 December 2000. It was released on DVD in widescreen format on March 29, 2001. On 5 January 2010, In2Film released the film on Region 2 DVD.

== Reception ==
Critical reaction has been mostly positive with Dafoe's performance as Schreck/Orlok receiving particular praise. The film holds an 82% approval rating on the review aggregator website Rotten Tomatoes based on 140 reviews, with an average rating of 7.0/10. The site's critical consensus states: "Shadow of the Vampire is frightening, compelling, and funny, and features an excellent performance by Willem Dafoe." On Metacritic, the film has a 71 out of 100 rating, based on 31 critics, indicating "generally favorable reviews".

Roger Ebert gave the film 3½ stars out of 4, writing that "director E. Elias Merhige and his writer, Steven Katz, do two things at the same time. They make a vampire movie of their own, and they tell a backstage story about the measures that a director will take to realize his vision", and that Dafoe "embodies the Schreck of Nosferatu so uncannily that when real scenes from the silent classic are slipped into the frame, we don't notice a difference." Ebert later awarded the film his Special Jury Prize on his list of "The Best 10 Movies of 2000", writing of Dafoe's "astonishing performance" and of the film, "Avoiding the pitfall of irony; it plays the material straight, which is truly scary."

A. O. Scott of The New York Times wrote, "You can find diversion in an improbable blend of behind-the-scenes satire and art-house fright-fest, anchored by Willem Dafoe's creepy, comical and oddly moving performance as the blood-sucking Schreck."

== Accolades ==
Award	Year	Category	Nominee(s)	Result	Ref.
Academy Awards	2001	Best Supporting Actor	Willem Dafoe	Nominated	
Academy Awards	2001	Best Makeup and Hairstyling	Ann Buchanan, Amber Sibley	Nominated	
Bram Stoker Award	2001	Best Screenplay	Steven Katz	Won	
Golden Globe Awards	2002	Best Supporting Actor	Willem Dafoe	Nominated	
Independent Spirit Awards	2001	Best Supporting Male	Willem Dafoe	Won	
Independent Spirit Awards	2001	Best Cinematography	Lou Bogue	Nominated	
Los Angeles Film Critics Association Awards	2001	Best Supporting Actor	Willem Dafoe	Won	
Satellite Awards	2001	Best Supporting Actor, Comedy or Musical	Willem Dafoe	Won	
Screen Actors Guild Awards	2001	Best Supporting Actor	Willem Dafoe	Nominated	

== See also ==
- Vampire films
- "I, the Vampire", a 1937 short story by Henry Kuttner about an ancient European vampire employed as a horror film actor in Hollywood.
- "Flicker", an episode of American Horror Story: Hotel in which Murnau was actually a vampire while filming Nosferatu.
- Nosferatu (2024 film), a remake of Murnau's film directed by Robert Eggers, also starring Willem Dafoe.
