= Ann Buchanan =

American make-up artist

- Occupation: Makeup artist
- Years active: 1987–present

Ann Buchanan is a make-up artist.

She was nominated for an Academy Award at the 73rd Academy Awards for her work on the film Shadow of the Vampire. Her nomination was shared with Amber Sibley.
