= Tracy Seretean =

American filmmaker

- Occupations: Director; Producer
- Notable work: Big Mama (2000); The Third Monday in October (2006)
- Awards: Academy Award for Best Documentary (Short Subject)

Tracy Seretean is an American filmmaker who directed and co-produced Big Mama (2000), which won the Academy Award for Documentary Short Subject. She also produced The Third Monday in October (2006).
