= Amber Sibley =

English make-up artist

- Occupation: Make-up artist

Amber Sibley is an English make-up artist. She was nominated for an Academy Award in the category Best Makeup and Hairstyling for the film Shadow of the Vampire.

== Selected filmography ==
- Shadow of the Vampire (2000; co-nominated with Ann Buchanan)
